= University Cup appearances by team =

The following is a list of U Sports college ice hockey teams that have qualified for the University Cup as of 2026 with teams listed by number of appearances.

U Sports men's Division I ice hockey tournament
School	Tournament appearances	Tournament years	Best result
Alberta	44	1964, 1966, 1968, 1969, 1970, 1972, 1973, 1975, 1976, 1977, 1978, 1979, 1980, 1984, 1985, 1986, 1987, 1989, 1991, 1992, 1993, 1997, 1998, 1999, 2000, 2001, 2002, 2003, 2004, 2005, 2006, 2008, 2009, 2010, 2011, 2013, 2014, 2015, 2016, 2017, 2018, 2019, 2022, 2023	Champions (1964, 1968, 1975, 1978, 1979, 1980, 1986, 1992, 1999, 2000, 2005, 2006, 2008, 2014, 2015, 2018)
New Brunswick	24	1964, 1984, 1997, 1998, 2000, 2003, 2004, 2007, 2008, 2009, 2011, 2012, 2013, 2015, 2016, 2017, 2018, 2019, 2020, 2022, 2023, 2024, 2025, 2026	Champions (1998, 2007, 2009, 2011, 2013, 2016, 2017, 2019, 2023, 2024)
Quebec–Trois-Rivières	24	1984, 1986, 1987, 1990, 1991, 1992, 1996, 1998, 1999, 2000, 2001, 2002, 2003, 2005, 2007, 2010, 2012, 2013, 2015, 2016, 2022, 2023, 2024, 2026	Champions (1987, 1991, 2001, 2003, 2022, 2026)
Saskatchewan	23	1967, 1981, 1982, 1983, 1987, 1998, 1999, 2000, 2002, 2005, 2006, 2007, 2008, 2012, 2013, 2014, 2016, 2017, 2018, 2019, 2020, 2025, 2026	Champions (1983)
Moncton	18	1976, 1978, 1980, 1981, 1982, 1983, 1986, 1989, 1990, 1995, 1999, 2005, 2007, 2008, 2012, 2024, 2025, 2026	Champions (1981, 1982, 1990, 1995)
Toronto	17	1966, 1967, 1968, 1969, 1970, 1971, 1972, 1973, 1975, 1976, 1977, 1978, 1982, 1983, 1984, 1985, 1993	Champions (1966, 1967, 1969, 1970, 1971, 1972, 1973, 1976, 1977, 1984)
St. Francis Xavier	17	1963, 1966, 1967, 1968, 1976, 1978, 2001, 2003, 2004, 2007, 2011, 2015, 2016, 2017, 2018, 2019, 2022	Champions (2004)
Saint Mary's Huskies	16	1969, 1970, 1971, 1972, 1973, 1974, 1975, 1977, 2002, 2009, 2010, 2013, 2016, 2020, 2023, 2026	Champions (2010)
Calgary	14	1974, 1976, 1980, 1981, 1986, 1988, 1990, 1995, 1996, 2000, 2011, 2015, 2023, 2024	Semifinals (1974, 1976, 1988, 1990, 1995, 1996)
Western Ontario	13	1987, 1988, 1994, 1995, 2000, 2001, 2002, 2005, 2009, 2011, 2012, 2016, 2020	Champions (2002)
Acadia	12	1992, 1993, 1994, 1996, 1998, 2006, 2014, 2015, 2017, 2018, 2020, 2022	Champions (1993, 1996)
Concordia Stingers ^{‡}	12	1976, 1977, 1978, 1979, 1980, 1981, 1982, 1983, 1984, 2018, 2023, 2025	Runners-Up (1983, 1984, 2025)
York	11	1970, 1985, 1986, 1987, 1988, 1989, 1997, 1999, 2003, 2004, 2017	Champions (1985, 1988, 1989)
Guelph	11	1976, 1979, 1980, 1993, 1994, 1995, 1997, 2002, 2015, 2019, 2020	Champions (1997)
McGill Redbirds	10	2006, 2008, 2009, 2010, 2011, 2012, 2014, 2017, 2018, 2024	Champions (2012)
Wilfrid Laurier	8	1983, 1986, 1989, 1990, 1992, 2001, 2006, 2007	Runners-Up (1989, 1990)
Manitoba	7	1965, 1976, 1977, 1984, 1985, 2005, 2010	Champions (1965)
Sir George Williams ^{‡}	7	1964, 1965, 1966, 1967, 1969, 1972, 1974	Runners-Up (1964, 1969, 1974)
British Columbia	6	1963, 1971, 1977, 2020, 2022, 2024	Runners-Up (1963)
Laurentian	6	1965, 1966, 1967, 1968, 1969, 1971	Runners-Up (1967)
Windsor	6	1998, 1999, 2014, 2015, 2023, 2026	Quarterfinals / Round-robin (1998, 1999, 2014, 2015, 2023, 2026)
Brandon	6	1974, 1975, 1976, 1981, 1982, 1983	Quarterfinals / Round-robin (1974, 1975, 1981, 1982, 1983)
Loyola ^{‡}	5	1968, 1970, 1971, 1973, 1975	Runners-Up (1968)
Lakehead	5	1973, 2003, 2006, 2009, 2010	Runners-Up (2006)
Prince Edward Island ^{†}	5	1985, 1987, 1988, 1991, 2023	Semifinals (1988, 1991, 2023)
Queen's	5	1981, 2017, 2019, 2025, 2026	Quarterfinals / Round-robin (1981, 2017, 2019, 2025, 2026)
Ottawa	4	1985, 2004, 2020, 2025	Champions (2025)
Waterloo	4	1974, 1991, 1996, 2013	Champions (1974)
Regina	4	1978, 1979, 1980, 1982	Runners-Up (1980)
Brock	4	2008, 2018, 2022, 2024	Quarterfinals / Round-robin (2008, 2018, 2022, 2024)
Toronto Metropolitan	3	2022, 2024, 2025	Semifinals (2022, 2024, 2025)
Dalhousie	3	1979, 1986, 2004	Runners-Up (1979)
Carleton	3	2014, 2016, 2019	Quarterfinals / Round-robin (2014, 2016, 2019)
Mount Royal	2	2025, 2026	Quarterfinals / Round-robin (2025, 2026)
McMaster	1	1963	Champions (1963)
Lethbridge	1	1994	Champions (1994)
Saint Dunstan's ^{†}	1	1965	Runners-Up (1965)
Sherbrooke	1	1963	Semifinals (1963)
Montreal	1	1964	Semifinals (1964)
Quebec–Chicoutimi	1	1979	Round-robin (1979)
St. Thomas	1	2001	Round-robin (2001)
Laval	1	1976	Regional semifinal (1976)

† Saint Dunstan's merged with Prince of Wales College in 1969 to form Prince Edward Island.
‡ Loyola and Sir George Williams merged in 1975 to form Concordia.

Teams in Italics no longer compete in U Sports.

== Teams without a tournament appearance ==
The following active U Sports programs have never qualified for the University Cup.

School	Joined U Sports
MacEwan	2021
Nipissing	2009
Ontario Tech	2007
Royal Military College	1963 *
Trinity Western	2021

* Other than war years, RMC has been active since 1890.

== Performance by team ==
The code in each cell represents the furthest the team made it in the respective tournament:

- – Not fielding a U Sports team
- RS Regional Semifinals (8 teams played in a regional semifinal in 1976)
- QF Quarterfinals (between 2 and 8 teams played in either a regional final or quarterfinal round; used off-and-on since 1966)
- SF / RR Semifinalist / Round-Robin (The University Cup has used either a round-robin or semifinal round to determine the final two teams)
- RU National Runner-up
- CH National Champion

Teams that received byes into the semifinal round are shown with underlined in years when quarterfinal were held.

Note: The 2020 tournament was cancelled after the first two quarterfinal games due to the COVID-19 pandemic. The 2020–21 season was also cancelled in its entirety.

School	Conference as of 2026	63	64	65	66	67	68	69	70	71	72	73	74	75	76	77	78	79	80	81	82	83	84	85	86	87	88	89	90	91	92	93	94	95	96	97	98	99	00	01	02	03	04	05	06	07	08	09	10	11	12	13	14	15	16	17	18	19	20	22	23	24	25	26
Alberta	Canada West		CH		RU		CH	SF	SF		SF	SF		CH	QF	RU	CH	CH	CH				SF	RU	CH	RR		SF		RU	CH	SF				SF	RR	CH	CH	RR	RR	RR	RR	CH	CH		CH	RR	RU	RR		RR	CH	CH	QF	QF	CH	RU		RU	RU			
New Brunswick	AUS		SF																				QF													RU	CH		RU			RR	RU			CH	RU	CH		CH	RR	CH		RU	CH	CH	SF	CH	QF	QF	CH	CH	QF	SF
Toronto	OUA				CH	CH	SF	CH	CH	CH	CH	CH		RU	CH	CH	RU				RR	RR	CH	SF								RU																																
Quebec–Trois-Rivières	OUA	–	–	–	–	–	–	–															SF		RU	CH			SF	CH	SF				SF		RR	RR	RR	CH	RU	CH		RR		RR			RR		RR	RR		SF	QF					CH	SF	RU		CH
Moncton	AUS	–	–												RS		RR		RR	CH	CH	RR			SF			SF	CH					CH				RU						RR		RU	RR				RR											QF	QF	QF
York	OUA	–	–						QF															CH	SF	RR	CH	CH								SF		RR				RR	RR													QF								
Acadia	AUS																														RU	CH	SF		CH		RU								RR								RR	QF		SF	QF		QF	QF				
Saskatchewan	Canada West					SF														RU	RU	CH				RU											RR	RR	RR		RR			RU	RR	RR	RR				RR	RR	RU		SF	RU	SF	SF	QF				SF	QF
Saint Mary's	AUS			–	–	–		SF	RU	RU	RU	RU	SF	SF		SF																									RR							RR	CH			RU			SF				SF		QF			RU
St. Francis Xavier	AUS	SF			SF	SF	QF								QF		RR																							RU		RU	CH			RR				RR				QF	RU	SF	RU	SF		SF				
Western Ontario	OUA	–	–																							RR	RU						SF	SF					RR	RR	CH			RR				RU		RR	RU				QF				SF					
Guelph	OUA	–	–												RU			RR	RR													SF	RU	RU		CH					RR													SF				QF	QF					
McGill	OUA																																												RR		RR	RR	RR	RU	CH		RR			QF	QF					SF		
Waterloo	OUA												CH																	SF					RU																	RR												
Manitoba	Canada West			CH											RS	QF							QF	QF																				RR					RR															
Lethbridge	—	–	–	–	–	–	–	–	–	–	–	–	–	–	–	–	–	–	–	–	–	–	–	–									CH																									QF		–	–	–	–	–
McMaster	—	CH																											–	–	–	–	–	–	–	–	–	–	–	–	–	–	–	–	–	–	–	–	–	–	–	–	–	–	–	–	–	–	–	–	–	–	–	–
Sir George Williams	—		RU	SF	QF	QF		RU			SF		RU		–	–	–	–	–	–	–	–	–	–	–	–	–	–	–	–	–	–	–	–	–	–	–	–	–	–	–	–	–	–	–	–	–	–	–	–	–	–	–	–	–	–	–	–	–	–	–	–	–	–
Concordia	OUA	–	–	–	–	–	–	–	–	–	–	–	–	–	SF	QF	RR	RR	RR	RR	RR	RU	RU																																		QF					QF	RU	
Wilfrid Laurier	OUA	–	–																			RR			QF			RU	RU		SF									RR					RR	RR																		
Laurentian	—	–	–	SF	SF	RU	SF	QF		SF																														–	–	–	–	–	–	–	–	–	–	–	–	–								–	–	–	–	–
Loyola	—						RU		SF	QF		SF		SF	–	–	–	–	–	–	–	–	–	–	–	–	–	–	–	–	–	–	–	–	–	–	–	–	–	–	–	–	–	–	–	–	–	–	–	–	–	–	–	–	–	–	–	–	–	–	–	–	–	–
Lakehead	OUA	–	–	–	–	–	–	–	–	–	–	QF													–	–	–	–	–	–	–	–	–	–	–	–	–	–	–	–		RR			RU			RR	RR															
Regina	Canada West	–	–	–	–	–	–	–	–	–	–	–	–	–	–		RR	RR	RU		RR																																											
British Columbia	Canada West	RU								SF						SF																																											QF	QF		QF		
Dalhousie	AUS																	RU							QF																		RR																					
Saint Dunstan's	—			RU					–	–	–	–	–	–	–	–	–	–	–	–	–	–	–	–	–	–	–	–	–	–	–	–	–	–	–	–	–	–	–	–	–	–	–	–	–	–	–	–	–	–	–	–	–	–	–	–	–	–	–	–	–	–	–	–
Calgary	Canada West												SF		SF				RR	RR					QF		SF		SF					SF	SF				RR											RR				QF							QF	QF		
Prince Edward Island	AUS	–	–	–	–	–	–	–																QF		RR	SF			SF																															SF			
Brandon	—												QF	QF	RS					RR	RR	RR																				–	–	–	–	–	–	–	–	–	–	–	–	–	–	–	–	–	–	–	–	–	–	–
Windsor	OUA	–	–																																		RR	RR															RR	QF							QF			SF
Ottawa	OUA																							SF																			RR											–	–				QF				CH	
Toronto Metropolitan	OUA	–	–																																																									SF		SF	SF	
Brock	OUA	–	–	–	–	–																																									RR										QF			QF		QF		
Queen's	OUA																			RR																																				QF		QF					QF	QF
Carleton	OUA													–	–	–	–	–	–	–	–	–	–	–	–	–	–	–	–	–	–	–	–	–	–	–	–	–	–	–	–	–	–	–	–	–							RR		QF			QF						
Mount Royal	Canada West	–	–																																																												QF	QF
Sherbrooke	—	SF												–	–	–	–	–	–	–	–	–	–	–	–	–	–	–	–	–	–	–	–	–	–	–	–	–	–	–	–	–	–	–	–	–	–	–	–	–	–	–	–	–	–	–	–	–	–	–	–	–	–	–
Montreal	—		SF									–	–	–	–	–	–	–	–	–	–	–	–	–	–	–	–	–	–	–	–	–	–	–	–	–	–	–	–	–	–	–	–	–	–	–	–	–	–	–	–	–	–	–	–	–	–	–	–	–	–	–	–	–
Quebec–Chicoutimi	—	–	–	–	–	–	–	–	–	–	–	–	–	–	–			RR								–	–	–	–	–	–	–	–	–	–	–	–	–	–	–	–	–	–	–	–	–	–	–	–	–	–	–	–	–	–	–	–	–	–	–	–	–	–	–
St. Thomas	—														–	–	–	–																						RR																–	–	–	–	–	–	–	–	–
Laval	—										–	–	–	–	RS		–						–	–	–	–	–	–	–	–	–	–	–	–	–	–	–	–	–	–	–	–	–	–	–	–	–	–	–	–	–	–	–	–	–	–	–	–	–	–	–	–	–	–

== See also ==
- University Cup all-time team records
