= 1984 CIAU University Cup =

Canadian hockey tournament

Tournament details
- Venue(s): Colisée de Trois-Rivières, Trois-Rivières, Quebec
- Dates: March 9–18
- Teams: 6

Final positions
- Champions: Toronto Varsity Blues (10th title)
- Runners-up: Concordia Stingers

Tournament statistics
- Games played: 9

Awards
- MVP: André Hidi (Toronto)

The 1984 CIAU Men's University Cup Hockey Tournament (22nd annual) was held at the Colisée de Trois-Rivières in Trois-Rivières, Quebec. The Quebec–Trois-Rivières Patriotes served as tournament host.

== Road to the Cup ==
=== AUAA playoffs ===
Semifinals
1	New Brunswick	4	5	8
4	Acadia	5	1	2
2	Moncton	3	3	—
3	Prince Edward Island	2	2	—

Championship
1	New Brunswick	3	8	—
2	Moncton	1	3	—

Note: * denotes overtime period(s)

=== Canada West playoffs ===
Championship
1	Alberta	4	9	—
2	Saskatchewan	2	2	—

Note: * denotes overtime period(s)

=== GPAC playoffs ===
Semifinal; February 28			Championship; March 2-4
			1	Manitoba	4	9	8
2	Brandon	5	2	Brandon	5	5	5
3	Regina	4

Note: * denotes overtime period(s)

=== OUAA playoffs ===
Quarterfinals; February
3	Western Ontario	9
6	Queen's	4
4	Guelph	10
5	Laurentian	1

Semifinals; February 24–26
1	Toronto	7	13	—
4	Guelph	2	4	—
2	Wilfrid Laurier	8	1	2
3	Western Ontario	5	5	3

Championship; February 29, March 2
1	Toronto	2	5	—
3	Western Ontario	1	3	—

Note: * denotes overtime period(s)

=== QUAA playoffs ===
Semifinals
1	Concordia	8	5	11	—	—
4	Quebec–Chicoutimi	3	2	3	—	—
2	McGill	5	5	9	2	—
3	Ottawa	6	10	5	3	—

Championship
1	Concordia	5	6	6	—	—
3	Ottawa	2	3	4	—	—

Note: * denotes overtime period(s)

== University Cup ==
The tournament reverted to a bracket format. Since the QUAA served as tournament host and possessed two entrants, both teams received byes into the semifinal round. The first round was arranged as a regional final with the two western teams and two eastern teams each battling for a spot in the national semifinals.

The regional rounds were played as best of three series while the national semifinals were set as two-game total-goal series. The championship game remained a single elimination match.

The East regionals were held at the Aitken University Centre in Fredericton, New Brunswick. The West regionals were held at the Varsity Arena in Edmonton, Alberta.

=== East regional ===
Team	Qualification	Record	Appearance	Last
New Brunswick Red Devils	Atlantic: AUAA Champion	25–4–0	2nd	1964
Toronto Varsity Blues	Ontario: OUAA Champion	24–1–3	15th	1983

=== West regional ===
Team	Qualification	Record	Appearance	Last
Alberta Golden Bears	West: Canada West Champion	22–4–0	14th	1980
Manitoba Bisons	Plains: GPAC Champion	21–5–1	4th	1977

=== Quebec byes ===
Team	Qualification	Record	Appearance	Last
Concordia Stingers	Quebec: QUAA Champion	23–4–3	9th	1983
Quebec–Trois-Rivières Patriotes	Host	8–15–1	1st	Never

=== Bracket ===
Regional Finals; March 9–11
Alberta	4	7	—
Manitoba	2	1	—
New Brunswick	2	2	—
Toronto	3	5	—

Semifinals; March 16–17
Concordia	2	5	7
Alberta	2	3	5
Quebec–Trois-Rivières	3	1	4
Toronto	8	6	14

Championship; March 18
Concordia	1
Toronto	9

Note: * denotes overtime period(s)

== Championship final ==
March 18, 1984	Concordia Stingers	1–9	Toronto Varsity Blues	Colisée de Trois-Rivières, Trois-Rivières, Quebec
