= 1982 CIAU University Cup =

Canadian hockey tournament

Tournament details
- Venue(s): Jean-Louis Lévesque Arena, Moncton, New Brunswick
- Dates: March 11–14
- Teams: 6

Final positions
- Champions: Moncton Aigles Bleus (2nd title)
- Runners-up: Saskatchewan Huskies

Tournament statistics
- Games played: 7

Awards
- MVP: Alain Grenier (Moncton)

The 1982 CIAU Men's University Cup Hockey Tournament (20th annual) was held at the Jean-Louis Lévesque Arena in Moncton, New Brunswick. The Moncton Aigles Bleus served as tournament host.

== Road to the Cup ==
=== AUAA playoffs ===
	Pool 1	DAL	PEI	UNB	Overall
1	Dalhousie		L 3–4	W 3–2	1–1
4	Prince Edward Island	W 4–3		W 9–3	2–0
5	New Brunswick	L 2–3	L 3–9		0–2

	Pool 2	MAU	MON	SMU	Overall
2	Mount Allison		L 3–7	W 4–3	1–1
3	Moncton	W 7–3		W 4–1	2–0
6	Saint Mary’s	L 3–4	L 1–4		0–2

Championship
K2	Moncton	7	6	—
M2	Prince Edward Island	4	3	—

Note: * denotes overtime period(s)

=== Canada West playoffs ===
Championship; March 5-6
1	Saskatchewan	6	4	—
2	Calgary	2	2	—

Note: * denotes overtime period(s)

=== GPAC playoffs ===
Semifinal; March 2			Championship; March 5-7
			1	Regina	1	4	3
2	Brandon	5	2	Brandon	2	3	2
3	Manitoba	4

Note: * denotes overtime period(s)

=== OUAA playoffs ===
Quarterfinals
3	Queen's	3
6	Wilfrid Laurier	7
4	McMaster	6
5	York	5

Semifinals
1	Toronto	5	6	—
6	Wilfrid Laurier	2	2	—
2	Guelph	5	2	—
4	McMaster	2	1	—

Championship
1	Toronto	5	4	5
2	Guelph	6	3	4

Note: * denotes overtime period(s)

=== QUAA playoffs ===
Semifinals
1	Concordia	?	6	—
4	Laval	?	4	—
2	Quebec–Trois-Rivières	6	5	—
3	Ottawa	4	4	—

Championship
1	Concordia	?	?	—
2	Quebec–Trois-Rivières	?	?	—

Note: * denotes overtime period(s)

== University Cup ==
The tournament included the five senior league champions. Because host Moncton was also a champion, a wild-card spot was available. As the previous wild-card had gone to Canada West, this time it was given to the GPAC (Brandon). The six teams were sorted by a committee prior to the tournament and arranged so that the two GPAC teams would be in opposite groups.

In the round-robin groups, the teams that finished with the best record would advance to the championship game. If there was a tie for the best record, the first tie-breaker was goal differential. If there was a tie in goal differential, the teams would play sudden death overtime for the advantage.

Team	Qualification	Record	Appearance	Last
Brandon Bobcats	Wild-card	20–7–1	4th	1981
Concordia Stingers	Quebec: QUAA Champion	25–2–1	7th	1981
Moncton Aigles Bleus	Atlantic: AUAA Champion / Host	21–8–1	5th	1981
Regina Cougars	Plains: GPAC Champion	23–4–0	4th	1980
Saskatchewan Huskies	West: Canada West Champion	19–7–0	3rd	1981
Toronto Varsity Blues	Ontario: OUAA Champion	22–1–4	13th	1978

=== Bracket ===
	Pool 1	CON	REG	SAS	Overall
1	Concordia		W 6–5	L 3–4	1–1
4	Regina	L 5–6		L 2–8	0–2
5	Saskatchewan	W 4–3	W 8–2		2–0

	Pool 2	BRA	MON	TOR	Overall
2	Brandon		L 1–3	L 2–4	0–2
3	Moncton	W 3–1		W 8–3	2–0
6	Toronto	W 4–2	L 3–8		1–1

Championship; March 14
Saskatchewan	2
Moncton	3

Note: * denotes overtime period(s)
Note: round-robin games were played on consecutive days March 11–13

== Championship final ==
March 14, 1982	Moncton Aigles Bleus	3–2	Saskatchewan Huskies	Jean-Louis Lévesque Arena, Moncton, New Brunswick
