= 1981 CIAU University Cup =

Canadian hockey tournament

Tournament details
- Venue(s): Father David Bauer Olympic Arena, Calgary, Alberta
- Dates: March 12–15
- Teams: 6

Final positions
- Champions: Moncton Aigles Bleus (1st title)
- Runners-up: Saskatchewan Huskies

Tournament statistics
- Games played: 7

Awards
- MVP: Benoit Fortier (Moncton)

The 1981 CIAU Men's University Cup Hockey Tournament (19th annual) was held at the Father David Bauer Olympic Arena in Calgary, Alberta. The Calgary Dinos served as tournament host.

== Road to the Cup ==
=== AUAA playoffs ===
Quarterfinals
M2	New Brunswick	4
K3	Saint Mary’s	0
K2	Dalhousie	5
M3	Prince Edward Island	2

Semifinals
K1	Moncton	8
M2	New Brunswick	5
M1	Mount Allison	3
K2	Dalhousie	5

Championship
K1	Moncton	4	8	—
K2	Dalhousie	3	4	—

Note: * denotes overtime period(s)

=== Canada West playoffs ===
Championship; March 6-8
1	Calgary	3	4	2
2	Saskatchewan	6	3	3

Note: * denotes overtime period(s)

=== GPAC playoffs ===
Semifinal; March 2			Championship; March 6-7
			1	Brandon	6	7	—
2	Manitoba	5	2	Manitoba	3	4	—
3	Regina	3

Note: * denotes overtime period(s)

=== OUAA playoffs ===
Quarterfinals; February 18, 20
3	Toronto	8
6	McMaster	4
4	Guelph	4
5	York	5

Semifinals; February 20, 22
1	Queen's	8	6	—
5	York	0	2	—
2	Western Ontario	5	4	—
3	Toronto	2	0	—

Championship; March 2, 4
1	Queen's	3	6	—
2	Western Ontario	1	5	—

Note: * denotes overtime period(s)

=== QUAA playoffs ===
Semifinals; February 25-28
1	Concordia	7	5	—
4	Quebec–Trois-Rivières	2	2	—
2	Ottawa	5	2	3
3	Laval	3	3	2

Championship; March 4-6
1	Concordia	4	8	—
2	Ottawa	3	1	—

Note: * denotes overtime period(s)

== University Cup ==
The tournament included the five senior league champions as well as the host team. The six teams were sorted by a committee prior to the tournament and arranged so that the two Canada West teams would be in opposite groups.

In the round-robin groups, the teams that finished with the best record would advance to the championship game. If there was a tie for the best record, the first tie-breaker was goal differential. If there was a tie in goal differential, the teams would play sudden death overtime for the advantage.

Team	Qualification	Record	Appearance	Last
Brandon Bobcats	Plains: GPAC Champion	25–1–0	3rd	1975
Calgary Dinos	Host	19–8–0	4th	1980
Concordia Stingers	Quebec: QUAA Champion	26–1–1	6th	1980
Moncton Aigles Bleus	Atlantic: AUAA Champion	21–5–1	4th	1980
Queen's Gaels	Ontario: OUAA Champion	18–3–5	1st	Never
Saskatchewan Huskies	West: Canada West Champion	17–10–0	2nd	1967

=== Bracket ===
	Pool 1	BRA	CAL	MON	Overall
1	Brandon		L 3–6	L 3–10	0–2
4	Calgary	W 6–3		L 2–5	1–1
5	Moncton	W 10–3	W 5–2		2–0

	Pool 2	CON	QUE	SAS	Overall
2	Concordia		L 2–3	L 3–8	0–2
3	Queen's	W 3–2		L 4–5	1–1
6	Saskatchewan	W 8–3	W 5–4		2–0

Championship; March 15
Moncton	4
Saskatchewan	2

Note: * denotes overtime period(s)
Note: round-robin games were played on consecutive days March 12–14

== Championship final ==
March 15, 1981	Moncton Aigles Bleus	4–2	Saskatchewan Huskies	Father David Bauer Olympic Arena, Calgary, Alberta
