= 2007 CIS University Cup =

Canadian hockey tournament

Tournament details
- Venue(s): Jean-Louis Lévesque Arena, Moncton, New Brunswick
- Teams: 6

Final positions
- Champions: New Brunswick Varsity Reds (2nd title)
- Runners-up: Moncton Aigles Bleus

Tournament statistics
- Games played: 7

Awards
- MVP: Yvan Busque (Moncton)

The 2007 CIS Men's University Cup Hockey Tournament (45th Annual) was held March 22–25, 2007, at the J. Louis Levesque Arena in Moncton, New Brunswick. The Moncton Aigles Bleus served as tournament host.

== Road to the Cup ==
=== AUS playoffs ===
Quarterfinals
3	St. Francis Xavier	2	4	—
6	Acadia	1	3	—
4	Saint Mary’s	3	5	6
5	St. Thomas	5	4	7

Semifinals
1	Moncton	4	6	6	—	—
5	St. Thomas	3	0	3	—	—
2	New Brunswick	4	4	2	2	—
3	St. Francis Xavier	1	2	5	1	—

Championship
1	Moncton	4	3	—
2	New Brunswick	2	2	—

Note: * denotes overtime period(s)

=== OUA playoffs ===
Division Quarterfinals
E3	McGill	6	5	8
E6	Concordia	3	6*	0
E4	Ottawa	2	1	—
E5	Queen's	1	0	—
W3	Western Ontario	2	1	3*
W6	Brock	0	3	2
W4	York	2	3	—
W5	Lakehead	3*	4****	—

Division Semifinals
E1	Quebec–Trois-Rivières	3	2	4
E4	Ottawa	0	5	2
East
E2	Toronto	1	2	—
E3	McGill	0	0	—
W1	Wilfrid Laurier	4	5	—
W5	Lakehead	2	2	—
West
W2	Waterloo	3	2	2
W3	Western Ontario	2	3**	1

Division Finals
E1	Quebec–Trois-Rivières	7*	5*	—
E2	Toronto	6	4	—
W1	Wilfrid Laurier	5	7*	—
W2	Waterloo	3	6	—

Queen's Cup Final
E1	Quebec–Trois-Rivières	5
W1	Wilfrid Laurier	3

Note: * denotes overtime period(s)

=== Canada West playoffs ===
Division Semifinal
G2	Regina	4	0	1
M4	Calgary	2	2	2
M2	Lethbridge	5	4	3
M3	British Columbia	6	3	5

Division Final
G1	Saskatchewan	3	2	—
M4	Calgary	2	0	—
M1	Alberta	5	3	—
M3	British Columbia	1	2	—

Championship
G1	Saskatchewan	3	4	—
M1	Alberta	2	3	—

Note: * denotes overtime period(s)

== University Cup ==
The six teams that advanced to the tournament are listed below. The champions of each conference tournament received automatic bids and were seeded 1–3. The OUA runner-up Wilfrid Laurier received the Quebec bid held by OUA. The spot reserved for the host went to AUS runner-up New Brunswick due to host Acadia winning their conference championship. The rotating wild-card spot was held by the AUS and went to St. Francis Xavier for finishing third in the postseason tournament.

Seed	Team	Qualification	Record	Appearance	Last
1	Moncton Aigles Bleus	Atlantic: AUS Champion / Host	27–4–2	13th	2005
2	Saskatchewan Huskies	West: Canada West Champion	20–9–3	12th	2006
3	Quebec–Trois-Rivières Patriotes	Ontario: OUA Champion	22–9–3	15th	2005
4	Wilfrid Laurier Golden Hawks	Quebec: OUA Finalist	26–6–1	8th	2006
5	New Brunswick Varsity Reds	Wild-Card – AUS Finalist	21–10–3	9th	2004
6	St. Francis Xavier X-Men	Wild-Card	19–15–0	10th	2004

=== Pool A ===
Seed	Team
1	Moncton
4	Wilfrid Laurier
6	St. Francis Xavier

Day	Game	Winner	Loser	Score
Thursday	1	#4 Wilfrid Laurier	#6 St. Francis Xavier	4–3
Friday	3	#1 Moncton	#6 St. Francis Xavier	5–3
Saturday	5	#1 Moncton	#4 Wilfrid Laurier	5–4

Team	GP	W	L	GF	GA	DIF	PTS
Moncton	2	2	0	10	7	+3	4
Wilfrid Laurier	2	1	1	8	8	0	2
St. Francis Xavier	2	0	2	6	9	−3	0

Moncton advances to championship

=== Pool B ===
Seed	Team
2	Saskatchewan
3	Quebec–Trois-Rivières
5	New Brunswick

Day	Game	Winner	Loser	Score
Thursday	2	#5 New Brunswick	#2 Saskatchewan	2–1
Friday	4	#3 Quebec–Trois-Rivières	#2 Saskatchewan	3–2
Saturday	6	#5 New Brunswick	#3 Quebec–Trois-Rivières	6–0

Team	GP	W	L	GF	GA	DIF	PTS
New Brunswick	2	2	0	8	1	+7	4
Quebec–Trois-Rivières	2	1	1	3	8	−5	2
Saskatchewan	2	0	2	3	5	−2	0

New Brunswick advances to championship

== Championship final ==
March 25, 2007; 7:00 PM (EST)	#1 Moncton Aigles Bleus	2–3 (2OT)	#5 New Brunswick Varsity Reds	J. Louis Levesque Arena, Moncton, New Brunswick
