= 2006 CIS University Cup =

Canadian hockey tournament

Tournament details
- Venue(s): Clare Drake Arena, Edmonton, Alberta
- Teams: 6

Final positions
- Champions: Alberta Golden Bears (12th title)
- Runners-up: Lakehead Thunderwolves

Tournament statistics
- Games played: 7

Awards
- MVP: Harlan Anderson (Alberta)

The 2006 CIS Men's University Cup Hockey Tournament (44th Annual) was held at the Clare Drake Arena in Edmonton, Alberta. The Alberta Golden Bears served as tournament host.

== Road to the Cup ==
=== AUS playoffs ===
Quarterfinals
3	New Brunswick	7	3	9
6	St. Francis Xavier	5	4*	3
4	Saint Mary’s	0	5	3
5	St. Thomas	1	3	1

Semifinals
1	Acadia	8	5	—
4	Saint Mary’s	4	2	—
2	Moncton	3	1	—
3	New Brunswick	5	4	—

Championship
1	Acadia	2	5	5	—	—
3	New Brunswick	1	3	3	—	—

Note: * denotes overtime period(s)

=== OUA playoffs ===
Division Quarterfinals
E3	Quebec–Trois-Rivières	7	6	—
E6	Royal Military College	2	1	—
E4	Ottawa	1	4*	6
E5	Concordia	4	3	4
W3	Waterloo	4	2	8
W6	Brock	3	3***	2
W4	Lakehead	4	5*	—
W5	York	3	4	—

Division Semifinals
E1	McGill	1	4	3
E4	Ottawa	2	3	1
East
E2	Toronto	1	2	—
E3	Quebec–Trois-Rivières	2	3	—
W1	Western Ontario	3	6	0
W4	Lakehead	4*	2	3
West
W2	Wilfrid Laurier	2	5	6
W3	Waterloo	6	2	2

Division Finals
E1	McGill	4	3*	—
E3	Quebec–Trois-Rivières	3	2	—
W4	Lakehead	4	2	4
W2	Wilfrid Laurier	1	4	2

Queen's Cup Final
E1	McGill	0
W4	Lakehead	4

Note: * denotes overtime period(s)

=== Canada West playoffs ===
Division Semifinal
G2	Manitoba	3	7	6
G3	Regina	4	1	2
M2	Calgary	3	5	4
M3	British Columbia	4	4	1

Division Final
G1	Saskatchewan	6	5	—
G2	Manitoba	5	4	—
M1	Alberta	8	7	—
M2	Calgary	1	4	—

Championship
G1	Saskatchewan	0	1	—
M1	Alberta	2	6	—

Note: * denotes overtime period(s)

== University Cup ==
The rotating wild-card moved to OUA. In lieu of a third place game, the bid went to Wilfrid Laurier on the basis of winning more conference semifinal games than Quebec–Trois-Rivières (1 vs. 0). The teams were ranked and sorted with preference given to avoiding intra-conference matches in pool play.

Seed	Team	Qualification	Record	Appearance	Last
1	Alberta Golden Bears	West: Canada West Champion / Host	25–5–2	31st	2005
2	Acadia Axemen	Atlantic: AUS Champion	24–8–1	6th	1998
3	Lakehead Thunderwolves	Ontario: OUA Champion	20–11–4	3rd	2003
4	McGill Redmen	Quebec: OUA Finalist	24–3–3	1st	Never
5	Saskatchewan Huskies	Canada West Finalist	19–9–4	11th	2005
6	Wilfrid Laurier Golden Hawks	Wild-Card	16–12–2	7th	2001

=== Pool A ===
Seed	Team
1	Alberta
4	McGill
6	Wilfrid Laurier

Day	Game	Winner	Loser	Score
Thursday	1	#4 McGill	#6 Wilfrid Laurier	4–3
Friday	3	#1 Alberta	#6 Wilfrid Laurier	8–2
Saturday	5	#1 Alberta	#4 McGill	5–1

Team	GP	W	L	GF	GA	DIF	PTS
Alberta	2	2	0	13	3	+10	4
McGill	2	1	1	5	8	−3	2
Wilfrid Laurier	2	0	2	5	12	−7	0

Alberta advances to championship

=== Pool B ===
Seed	Team
2	Acadia
3	Lakehead
5	Saskatchewan

Day	Game	Winner	Loser	Score
Thursday	2	#5 Saskatchewan	#2 Acadia	5–1
Friday	4	#3 Lakehead	#2 Acadia	4–3
Saturday	6	#3 Lakehead	#5 Saskatchewan	4–2

Team	GP	W	L	GF	GA	DIF	PTS
Lakehead	2	2	0	8	5	+3	4
Saskatchewan	2	1	1	7	5	+2	2
Acadia	2	0	2	4	9	−5	0

Lakehead advances to championship

== Championship final ==
March 26, 2006	#1 Alberta Golden Bears	3–2	#3 Lakehead Thunderwolves	Clare Drake Arena, Edmonton, Alberta
