= 2003 CIS University Cup =

Canadian hockey tournament

Tournament details
- Venue(s): Aitken University Centre, Fredericton, New Brunswick
- Teams: 6

Final positions
- Champions: Quebec–Trois-Rivières Patriotes (4th title)
- Runners-up: St. Francis Xavier X-Men
- Third place: Alberta Golden Bears
- Fourth place: New Brunswick Varsity Reds

Tournament statistics
- Games played: 8

Awards
- MVP: Éric Desjardins (Quebec–Trois-Rivières)

The 2003 CIS Men's University Cup Hockey Tournament (41st annual) was held at the Aitken University Centre in Fredericton, New Brunswick. The New Brunswick Varsity Reds served as tournament host.

== Road to the Cup ==
=== AUS playoffs ===
Quarterfinals
3	St. Francis Xavier	3	4	—
6	Prince Edward Island	0	0	—
4	New Brunswick	2	3	—
5	Saint Mary’s	0	1	—

Semifinals
1	St. Thomas	3	2	1
4	New Brunswick	5	1	4
2	Dalhousie	4	1	4
3	St. Francis Xavier	0	3	6

Championship
4	New Brunswick	3	2	5	4	—
3	St. Francis Xavier	1	4	3	3	—

Note: * denotes overtime period(s)

=== OUA playoffs ===
Division Semifinals
FE2	McGill	2	2	—
FE3	Ottawa	3	3	—
ME2	Queen's	4	3	—
ME3	Royal Military College	1	2	—
MW2	Wilfrid Laurier	5	2	—
MW3	Brock	2	1	—
FW2	Lakehead	4	11	—
FW3	Windsor	2	2	—

Division Finals
FE1	Quebec–Trois-Rivières	11	2	—
FE3	Ottawa	2	1	—
East
ME1	Toronto	1	0	5
ME2	Queen's	0	2	1
MW1	York	5	3	5
MW2	Wilfrid Laurier	4	5	0
West
FW1	Western Ontario	2	1	—
FW2	Lakehead	5	2	—

Semifinals
FE1	Quebec–Trois-Rivières	6
ME1	Toronto	3
MW1	York	4
FW2	Lakehead	1

Gold Medal Game
FE1	Quebec–Trois-Rivières	7
MW1	York	4
Bronze Medal Game
ME1	Toronto	5
FW2	Lakehead	6

Note: * denotes overtime period(s)

=== Canada West playoffs ===
Division Semifinal
G2	Manitoba	6	4	—
G3	Regina	2	0	—
M2	Calgary	2	2	6
M3	Lethbridge	1	5	4

Division Final
G1	Saskatchewan	5	5	—
G2	Manitoba	3	0	—
M1	Alberta	7	5	—
M2	Calgary	2	2	—

Championship
G1	Saskatchewan	4	2	2
M1	Alberta	2	4	5

Note: * denotes overtime period(s)

== University Cup ==
The rotating wild-card moved to OUA. In order to determine which team received the bid, the conference reintroduced a third-place game. Because AUS was serving as the host conference, they automatically received two bids. The teams were ranked with preference given to avoiding intra-conference matches in pool play. A consolation game was reintroduced for the first time since 1972.

Seed	Team	Qualification	Record	Appearance	Last
1	Alberta Golden Bears	West: Canada West Champion	28–3–2	28th	2002
2	Quebec–Trois-Rivières Patriotes	Quebec: OUA Champion	24–2–2	13th	2002
3	New Brunswick Varsity Reds	Atlantic: AUS Champion / Host	22–14–1	7th	2000
4	York Lions	Ontario: OUA Runner-up	20–8–1	9th	1999
5	St. Francis Xavier X-Men	Wild-card: AUS Runner-up	19–16–2	8th	2001
6	Lakehead Thunderwolves	Wild-card: OUA Third place	23–7–0	2nd	1973

=== Bracket ===
	Pool A	ALB	YOR	SFX	Overall
1	Alberta		W 4–0	L 2–3	1–1
4	York	L 0–4		L 4–5	0–2
5	St. Francis Xavier	W 3–2	W 5–4		2–0

	Pool B	QTR	UNB	LAK	Overall
2	Quebec–Trois-Rivières		W 4–3	W 2–1	2–0
3	New Brunswick	L 3–4		W 4–3	1–1
6	Lakehead	L 1–2	L 3–4		0–2

Gold Medal Game
2	Quebec–Trois-Rivières	3
5	St. Francis Xavier	0
Bronze Medal Game
1	Alberta	8
3	New Brunswick	2

Note: * denotes overtime period(s)

== Championship final ==
#2 Quebec–Trois-Rivières Patriotes	3–0	#5 St. Francis Xavier X-Men	Aitken University Centre, Fredericton, New Brunswick
