= 1974 CIAU University Cup =

Canadian hockey tournament

Tournament details
- Venue(s): Varsity Arena, Toronto, Ontario
- Dates: March 3–16
- Teams: 5

Final positions
- Champions: Waterloo Warriors (1st title)
- Runners-up: Sir George Williams Georgians

Tournament statistics
- Games played: 8

Awards
- MVP: Bernie Wolfe (Sir George Williams)

The 1974 CIAU Men's University Cup Hockey Tournament (12th annual) was held at the Varsity Arena in Toronto, Ontario. The Toronto Varsity Blues served as tournament host.

Waterloo Warriors won the first overtime championship game in tournament history. Because sudden death rules were not in place, three goals were scored in extra period.

== Road to the Cup ==
=== AUAA playoffs ===
Semifinals
S1	Saint Mary’s	7
N2	New Brunswick	0
N1	Moncton	5
S2	St. Francis Xavier	1

Championship
S1	Saint Mary’s	12
N1	Moncton	2

Note: * denotes overtime period(s)

=== OUAA playoffs ===
Quarterfinals; February 26
E1	Toronto	8
E4	Queen's	2
W2	Western Ontario	4
W3	Guelph	1
W1	Waterloo	8
W4	Wilfrid Laurier	6
E2	York	8
E3	Laurentian	2

Semifinals; March 1
E1	Toronto	4
W2	Western Ontario	6
W1	Waterloo	8
E2	York	4

Championship; March 2
W2	Western Ontario	4
W1	Waterloo	6

Note: * denotes overtime period(s)

=== QUAA playoffs ===
Quarterfinals; February 20
3	Sir George Williams	9
6	Bishop's	1
4	Sherbrooke	6
5	McGill	5

Semifinals; February 22
1	Quebec–Trois-Rivières	5
4	Sherbrooke	8
2	Loyola	4
3	Sir George Williams	5

Championship; February 27–28
4	Sherbrooke	3	3	—
3	Sir George Williams	6	4	—

Note: * denotes overtime period(s)

=== West ===
==== GPAC season ====
Seed	School	Standings
1	Brandon	11–7–0
2	Winnipeg	10–8–0
3	Manitoba	9–9–0
4	Lakehead	6–12–0

No playoff

==== Canada West playoffs ====
Championship; February 21-23
1	Calgary	2	6	—
2	Alberta	1	5	—

Note: * denotes overtime period(s)

== University Cup ==
The format from the previous season remained in place. The teams were sorted by committee.

Team	Qualification	Record	Appearance	Last
Brandon Bobcats	Plains: GPAC Champion	11–7–0	1st	Never
Calgary Dinos	West: Canada West Champion	16–4–0	1st	Never
Saint Mary's Huskies	Atlantic: AUAA Champion	21–2–0	6th	1973
Sir George Williams Georgians	Quebec: QUAA Champion	14–4–4	7th	1972
Waterloo Warriors	Ontario: OUAA Champion	15–2–3	1st	Never

=== Bracket ===
West Quarterfinal; March 3–4
Calgary	14	4	—
Brandon	5	3	—

Semifinals; March 8–10
Waterloo	6	3	—
Calgary	3	2	—
Saint Mary's	5	4	4
Sir George Williams	4	5	7

Championship; March 16
Waterloo	6*
Sir George Williams	5

Note: * denotes overtime period(s)

== Championship final ==
March 16, 1974	Waterloo Warriors	6–5 (OT)	Sir George Williams Georgians	Varsity Arena, Toronto, Ontario
