= 2011 CIS University Cup =

2011 Cavendish Farms CIS University Cup Presented By Home Depot
Tournament details
- Venue(s): Aitken University Centre, Fredericton, New Brunswick
- Dates: March 24–27, 2011
- Teams: 6

Final positions
- Champions: New Brunswick Varsity Reds (4th title)
- Runners-up: McGill Redmen

Tournament statistics
- Games played: 7
- Attendance: 26,250 (3,750 per game)

Awards
- MVP: Luke Gallant (New Brunswick)

The 2011 CIS Men's University Cup Hockey Tournament (49th Annual) was held March 24–27, 2011. It was the first year of a two-year CIS Championship bid won by University of New Brunswick and hosted at their on-campus hockey rink – Aitken University Centre. The defending champions were St. Mary's Huskies, who won their 1st title in team history the previous year in Saskatoon. There would be a new champion this season as SMU was unsuccessful in advancing to the event.

Similar to previous years, going back to the introduction of the expanded format in 1998, the six invited teams were split into two(2) Pools of three(3) where each team plays the other(two games total). The best team in each Pool advances to the final. All pool games must be decided by a win, there are no ties. If a pool has a three-way tie for 1st (all teams have 1–1 records) than GF/GA differential among the tied teams is the first tie-breaker.

== Road to the Cup ==
=== AUS playoffs ===
Quarterfinals
3	St. Francis Xavier	4	3	—
6	Dalhousie	0	2	—
4	Acadia	1	1	—
5	Prince Edward Island	0	0	—

Semifinals
1	New Brunswick	4	3	1	3	—
4	Acadia	0	2	3	2	—
2	Saint Mary’s	3	4	2	4	2
3	St. Francis Xavier	5	3	3	1	3

Championship
1	New Brunswick	3	1	2	3	5
3	St. Francis Xavier	2	2	0	6	4

Note: * denotes overtime period(s)

=== OUA playoffs ===
Division Quarterfinals; February 16–20
E1	McGill	2	10	—
E8	Ottawa	1	5	—
E2	Quebec–Trois-Rivières	5	3	5
E7	Concordia	2	5	3
East
E3	Carleton	1	7	4
E6	Toronto	2	3	0
E4	Nipissing	7	6	—
E5	Queen's	0	3	—
W1	Western Ontario	4	4	—
W8	Windsor	1	2	—
W2	Wilfrid Laurier	1	2**	2
W7	Ontario Tech	2*	1	1
West
W3	Lakehead	0	0	—
W6	Waterloo	5	3	—
W4	Guelph	3	3	8
W5	Brock	2	4	5

Division Semifinals; February 23–27
E1	McGill	4	6	—
E4	Nipissing	1	4	—
E2	Quebec–Trois-Rivières	4	1	4
E3	Carleton	2	4	0
W1	Western Ontario	4	1	6
W6	Waterloo	2	2	0
W2	Wilfrid Laurier	0	3	1
W4	Guelph	3	0	2

Division Finals; March 2–6
E1	McGill	5	1	6
E2	Quebec–Trois-Rivières	3	6	1
W1	Western Ontario	4	4	—
W4	Guelph	1	2	—

Queen's Cup Final; March 12
E1	McGill	6
W1	Western Ontario	2

Note: * denotes overtime period(s)

=== Canada West playoffs ===
Semifinal
1	Alberta	4	2	—
4	Manitoba	0	1	—
2	Calgary	4	2	4
3	Saskatchewan	2	3	1

Championship
1	Alberta	3	8	—
2	Calgary	0	1	—

Note: * denotes overtime period(s)

== University Cup ==
The six teams to advance to the tournament are listed below. The wild-card team was selected from the CW Conference as the OUA was provided the wild-card in 2010 and AUS teams are ineligible as they are the host conference. To avoid having St.FX in the same pool as UNB and Western in the same pool as McGill, the two teams were swapped.

Rank	Seed	Team	Qualification	Record	Appearance	Last
1	1	New Brunswick Varsity Reds	Atlantic: AUS Champion	29–8–0	12th	2009
2	2	McGill Redmen	Quebec: OUA Champion	31–3–2	5th	2010
3	3	Alberta Golden Bears	West: Canada West Champion	23–6–3	35th	2010
5	4	Western Ontario Mustangs	Ontario: OUA Runner-up	26–8–3	10th	2009
4	5	St. Francis Xavier X-Men	Host	24–15–1	11th	2007
6	6	Calgary Dinos	Wild-card: Canada West Runner-up	19–11–3	11th	2000

=== Pool A – Evening ===
Seed	Team
1	New Brunswick
4	Western Ontario
6	Calgary Dinos

Day	Game	Home	Visitor	Score
Thursday	2	#6 Calgary	#1 New Brunswick	1–2
Friday	4	#4 Western Ontario	#6 Calgary	3–2
Saturday	6	#1 New Brunswick	#4 Western Ontario	4–0

Team	GP	W	L	GF	GA	DIF	PTS
New Brunswick	2	2	0	6	1	+5	4
Western Ontario	2	1	1	3	6	−3	2
Calgary	2	0	2	3	5	−2	0

=== Pool B – Afternoon ===
Seed	Team
2	McGill
3	Alberta
5	St. Francis Xavier

Day	Game	Home	Visitor	Score
Thursday	1	#5 St. Francis Xavier	#2 McGill	1–2
Friday	3	#3 Alberta	#5 St. Francis Xavier	1–3
Saturday	5	#2 McGill	#3 Alberta	6–3

Team	GP	W	L	GF	GA	DIF	PTS
McGill	2	2	0	8	4	+4	4
St. Francis Xavier	2	1	1	4	3	+1	2
Alberta	2	0	2	4	9	−5	0

== Championship final ==
Bench assignments, for the championship final, are based on each advancing team's record and stats in their 2 pool games, not their tournament seed. UNB was determined the home team with a record of 2–0 (4pts) and a GF/GA of 6/1 = 6.0 versus McGill with the same record but a GF/GA of 8/4 = 2.0.

March 27, 2011; 8:00 PM; Rogers Sportsnet	#1 UNB Varsity Reds (H)	4–0 (1–0, 1–0, 2–0)	#2 McGill Redmen (V)	Aitken University Centre, Fredericton; Attendance: 3,750

Game reference

Travis Fullerton (3–0–0)
Goalies
Hubert Morin (2–1–0)
Referees:
Adam Byblow
Mark Hulshof
Linesmen:
Benoit Martineau
Jay Doiron

L. Gallant (B. Wright, H. Trembley) – 10:04	1–0
D. Todd (H. Trembley, L. Gallant) – 34:01	2–0
M. Fillier (N. MacNeil, J. Harty ) – 44:31	3–0
D. Todd (C. Culligan, L. Gallant) – 51:15	4–0

2 for 4 min
Penalties
2 for 4 min
(9, 11, 7) – 27
Shots
28 – (8, 12, 8)

== Tournament All-Stars ==
Luke Gallant, a defenceman from the UNB Varsity Reds, was selected as the Major W.J. 'Danny' McLeod Award for CIS University Cup MVP. He led all players at the tournament with seven points (2+5=7) in three games including an assist on Josh Kidd's game-winning goal with 4.1 seconds remaining in a 2–1 victory over Calgary in their first game on Thursday. Plus back-to-back game-winners in a 4–0 shutout of Western on Saturday and a 4–0 victory of second-ranked McGill in Sunday's national final. Gallant earned Game-MVP honours against both Western and McGill following a pair of three-point performances.

Joining Gallant on the tournament all-star team were:

- Forward: Kyle Bailey (UNB Varsity Reds)
- Forward: Chris Culligan (UNB Varsity Reds)
- Forward: Maxime Langelier-Parent (McGill Redmen)
- Defenseman: Jonathan Harty (UNB Varsity Reds)
- Goalie: Travis Fullerton (UNB Varsity Reds)
