= 2005 CIS University Cup =

Canadian hockey tournament

Tournament details
- Venue(s): Clare Drake Arena, Edmonton, Alberta
- Teams: 6

Final positions
- Champions: Alberta Golden Bears (11th title)
- Runners-up: Saskatchewan Huskies

Tournament statistics
- Games played: 7

Awards
- MVP: Ben Thomson (Alberta)

The 2005 CIS Men's University Cup Hockey Tournament (43rd annual) was held at the Clare Drake Arena in Edmonton, Alberta. The Alberta Golden Bears served as tournament host.

== Road to the Cup ==
=== AUS playoffs ===
Quarterfinals
3	Saint Mary’s	5	5	—
6	Prince Edward Island	2	2	—
4	New Brunswick	4	2	—
5	St. Francis Xavier	2	1	—

Semifinals
1	Acadia	3	4	—
4	New Brunswick	1	1	—
2	Moncton	5	5	—
3	Saint Mary’s	3	4	—

Championship
1	Acadia	4	2	1	4	2
2	Moncton	3	4	2	2	3

Note: * denotes overtime period(s)

=== OUA playoffs ===
Division Quarterfinals
E3	Quebec–Trois-Rivières	?	?	—	2
E6	Royal Military College	?	?	—	0
E4	Concordia	?	?	?	1
E5	Ottawa	?	?	?	2
W3	Lakehead	?	?	—	2
W6	Guelph	?	?	—	0
W4	Waterloo	?	?	?	2
W5	Wilfrid Laurier	?	?	?	1

Division Semifinals
E1	McGill	?	?	—	2
E5	Ottawa	?	?	—	0
East
E2	Toronto	1	2	—	0
E3	Quebec–Trois-Rivières	7	6	—	2
W1	Western Ontario	?	?	?	2
W4	Waterloo	?	?	?	1
West
W2	York	?	?	—	0
W3	Lakehead	?	?	—	2

Division Finals
E1	McGill	?	?	?	1
E3	Quebec–Trois-Rivières	?	?	?	2
W1	Western Ontario	?	?	?	2
W3	Lakehead	?	?	?	1

Queen's Cup Final
E3	Quebec–Trois-Rivières	0
W1	Western Ontario	4

Note: * denotes overtime period(s)

=== Canada West playoffs ===
Division Semifinal
G2	Manitoba	5	9	—
G3	Regina	1	6	—
M2	Calgary	6	3	—
M3	British Columbia	0	2	—

Division Final
G1	Saskatchewan	6	4	—
G2	Manitoba	3	3	—
M1	Alberta	4	7	—
M2	Calgary	3	1	—

Championship
G1	Saskatchewan	4	2	—
M1	Alberta	7	4	—
Third Place
G2	Manitoba	3	5	—
M2	Calgary	1	2	—

Note: * denotes overtime period(s)

== University Cup ==
The rotating wild-card moved to Canada West. Since host Alberta also won the league championship, the conference received a second wild-card bid. Canada West held a third-place series to determine the second wild-card entrant. The teams were ranked with preference given to avoiding intra-conference matches in pool play. The Bronze Medal game was discontinued.

Seed	Team	Qualification	Record	Appearance	Last
1	Alberta Golden Bears	West: Canada West Champion / Host	28–3–1	30th	2004
2	Moncton Aigles Bleus	Atlantic: AUS Champion	19–12–4	12th	1999
3	Western Ontario Mustangs	Ontario: OUA Champion	22–9–0	8th	2002
4	Quebec–Trois-Rivières Patriotes	Quebec: OUA Runner-up	21–8–3	14th	2003
5	Saskatchewan Huskies	Wild-card: Canada West Runner-up	21–8–3	10th	2002
6	Manitoba Bisons	Wild-card: Canada West Third place	19–10–5	6th	1985

=== Bracket ===
	Pool A	ALB	QTR	MAN	Overall
1	Alberta		W 11–0	W 5–1	2–0
4	Quebec–Trois-Rivières	L 0–11		L 1–4	0–2
6	Manitoba	L 1–5	W 4–1		1–1

	Pool B	MON	UWO	SAS	Overall
2	Moncton		W 8–3	L 0–3	1–1
3	Western Ontario	L 3–8		L 0–3	0–2
5	Saskatchewan	W 3–0	W 3–0		2–0

Championship
1	Alberta	5*
5	Saskatchewan	4

Note: * denotes overtime period(s)

== Championship final ==
#1 Alberta Golden Bears	5–4 (OT)	#5 Saskatchewan Huskies	Clare Drake Arena, Edmonton, Alberta
