= 1975 CIAU University Cup =

Canadian hockey tournament

Tournament details
- Venue(s): Varsity Arena, Edmonton, Alberta
- Dates: February 28 – March 16
- Teams: 5

Final positions
- Champions: Alberta Golden Bears (3rd title)
- Runners-up: Toronto Varsity Blues

Tournament statistics
- Games played: 10

Awards
- MVP: Dale Henwood (Alberta)

The 1975 CIAU Men's University Cup Hockey Tournament (13th annual) was held at the Varsity Arena in Edmonton, Alberta. The Alberta Golden Bears served as tournament host.

== Road to the Cup ==
=== AUAA playoffs ===
Semifinals
1	Saint Mary’s	7
4	Dalhousie	3
2	Moncton	3
3	Acadia	7

Championship
1	Saint Mary’s	9
3	Acadia	2

Note: * denotes overtime period(s)

=== OUAA playoffs ===
Quarterfinals; February 21
E1	York	9
E4	Ottawa	2
W2	Western Ontario	12
W3	Wilfrid Laurier	3
W1	Waterloo	9
W4	McMaster	6
E2	Toronto	4
E3	Laurentian	3

Semifinals; February 28
E1	York	9
W2	Western Ontario	3
W1	Waterloo	3
E2	Toronto	9

Championship; March 1
E1	York	3
E2	Toronto	4

Note: * denotes overtime period(s)

=== QUAA playoffs ===
Semifinals; February 26
1	Loyola	9
4	McGill	1
2	Quebec–Trois-Rivières	4
3	Sir George Williams	6

Championship; February 28-March 1
1	Loyola	5	6	—
3	Sir George Williams	1	2	—

Note: * denotes overtime period(s)

=== West ===
==== GPAC season ====
Seed	School	Standings
1	Brandon	17–5–0
2	Manitoba	13–8–1
3	Lakehead	7–9–1
4	Winnipeg	3–18–0

No playoff

==== Canada West playoffs ====
Championship; February 21-23
1	Alberta	5	1	4
2	British Columbia	2	2	2

Note: * denotes overtime period(s)

== University Cup ==
The teams were sorted by committee. The championship round was converted into a best of three series.

Team	Qualification	Record	Appearance	Last
Alberta Golden Bears	West: Canada West Champion	22–5–0	8th	1973
Brandon Bobcats	Plains: GPAC Champion	17–5–0	2nd	1974
Loyola Warriors	Quebec: QUAA Champion	19–2–2	5th	1973
Saint Mary's Huskies	Atlantic: AUAA Champion	18–1–1	7th	1974
Toronto Varsity Blues	Ontario: OUAA Champion	12–4–1	9th	1973

=== Bracket ===
West Quarterfinal; February 28–March 1
Alberta	10	8	—
Brandon	0	4	—

Semifinals; March 7–9
Loyola	0	3	—
Alberta	2	4	—
Saint Mary's	4	1	3
Toronto	2	2	6

Championship; March 14–16
Alberta	5	2	5
Toronto	0	3	2

Note: * denotes overtime period(s)

== Championship final series ==
March 14, 1975	Alberta Golden Bears	5–0	Toronto Varsity Blues	Varsity Arena, Edmonton, Alberta

March 15, 1975	Alberta Golden Bears	2–3	Toronto Varsity Blues	Varsity Arena, Edmonton, Alberta

March 16, 1975	Alberta Golden Bears	5–2	Toronto Varsity Blues	Varsity Arena, Edmonton, Alberta

Alberta Won Series 2–1
