= 2026 U Sports University Cup =

Canadian university ice hockey championship

Tournament details
- Cities: Halifax, Nova Scotia
- Venue: Scotiabank Centre
- Dates: March 19–22, 2026
- Teams: 8
- TV partner: CBC

Final positions
- Champions: Quebec–Trois-Rivières Patriotes (6th title)
- Runners-up: Saint Mary's Huskies
- Third place: UNB Reds
- Fourth place: Windsor Lancers

Awards
- MVP: Conor Frenette (Quebec–Trois-Rivières)

The 2026 U Sports University Cup, the 64th edition, was held from March 19 to March 22, 2026, in Halifax, Nova Scotia, to determine a national champion for the 2025–26 U Sports men's ice hockey season. The third-seeded OUA champion UQTR Patriotes defeated the eighth-seeded host Saint Mary's Huskies in the gold medal match to win their sixth national championship in program history.

== Host ==
The tournament was played at Scotiabank Centre in Halifax, Nova Scotia. This was the second time that Saint Mary's University had hosted the tournament, with the most recent in 2016. This was also the third time that Halifax hosted the tournament.

== Participating teams ==
Seed	Team	Qualified	Record	Last App	Total	Last Win	Total
1	Saskatchewan Huskies	CW Champion	19–7–1	2025	24th	1983	1
2	UNB Reds	AUS Champion	20–8–2	2025	24th	2024	10
3	UQTR Patriotes	OUA Champion	20–5–3	2024	24th	2022	5
4	Windsor Lancers	OUA Finalist	18–7–3	2023	5th	None	0
5	Mount Royal Cougars	CW Finalist	20–6–0	2025	2nd	None	0
6	Moncton Aigles Bleus	AUS Finalists	19–9–2	2025	18th	1995	4
7	Queen's Gaels	OUA Bronze	14–13–1	2025	5th	None	0
8	Saint Mary's Huskies	AUS Quarterfinalist (host)	16–11–3	2023	16th	2010	1

== Championship bracket ==
First Round: March 19-20
1	Saskatchewan Huskies	3
8	Saint Mary's Huskies	4*
4	Windsor Lancers	4
5	Mount Royal Cougars	3
2	UNB Reds	5
7	Queen’s Gaels	2
3	UQTR Patriotes	4
6	Moncton Aigles Bleus	0

Semi-Finals: March 21
8	Saint Mary's Huskies	4
4	Windsor Lancers	1
2	UNB Reds	4
3	UQTR Patriotes	7

Gold Medal Game: March 22
8	Saint Mary's Huskies	2
3	UQTR Patriotes	3*
Bronze Medal Game: March 22
4	Windsor Lancers	1
2	UNB Reds	5

Note: * denotes overtime period(s)

== Results ==
=== Quarterfinals ===
March 19, 2026; 7:00 PM	(1) Saskatchewan	3 – 4 (OT) (1–0, 1–2, 2–0, 0–1)	(8) Saint Mary's	Scotiabank Centre – Halifax, Nova Scotia; Attendance: 3,993

Game reference
Nolan Maier	Goalies	Marcus Vandenberg	Referees: Chad Ingalls; Mark Pearce; Linesmen: Adam Burnett; Brennan Walker
8 min	Penalties	14 min	Referees: Chad Ingalls; Mark Pearce; Linesmen: Adam Burnett; Brennan Walker
37	Shots	33	Referees: Chad Ingalls; Mark Pearce; Linesmen: Adam Burnett; Brennan Walker

March 19, 2026; 1:00 PM	(1) Windsor	4 – 3 (1–0, 0–1, 3–2)	(8) Mount Royal	Scotiabank Centre – Halifax, Nova Scotia; Attendance: 2,199

Game reference
Max Donoso	Goalies	Shane Farkas	Referees: Jesse Gour; Tyson Stewart; Linesmen: Matt McConnell; Nick Grenier
6 min	Penalties	4 min	Referees: Jesse Gour; Tyson Stewart; Linesmen: Matt McConnell; Nick Grenier
20	Shots	41	Referees: Jesse Gour; Tyson Stewart; Linesmen: Matt McConnell; Nick Grenier

March 20, 2026; 7:00 PM	(1) New Brunswick	5 – 2 (2–0, 1–1, 2–1)	(8) Queen’s	Scotiabank Centre – Halifax, Nova Scotia; Attendance: 3,465

Game reference
Rémi Delafontaine	Goalies	Tanner Wickware	Referees: Jesse Gour; Chad Ingalls; Linesmen: Matt McConnell; Brennan Walker
4 min	Penalties	6 min	Referees: Jesse Gour; Chad Ingalls; Linesmen: Matt McConnell; Brennan Walker
38	Shots	21	Referees: Jesse Gour; Chad Ingalls; Linesmen: Matt McConnell; Brennan Walker

March 20, 2026; 1:00 PM	(3) Quebec–Trois-Rivières	4 – 0 (3–0, 0–0, 1–0)	(6) Moncton	Scotiabank Centre – Halifax, Nova Scotia; Attendance: 2,616

Game reference

William Grimard
Goalies
Olivier Adam
Referees:
Tyson Stewart
Troy Murray
Linesmen:
Nick Grenier
Anthony Lapointe

(Rafanomezantso, Auger) Kassim Gaudet (1) – PP – 08:23	1–0
(Rondeau, Dumoulin) Charles Beaudoin (1) – 15:04	2–0
(Boutin) Mathis Cloutier (1) – 16:29	3–0
(Cloutier) Conor Frenette (1) – 44:59	4–0

12 min
Penalties
8 min
31
Shots
27
