= 1969 CIAU University Cup =

Canadian hockey tournament

Tournament details
- Venue(s): Varsity Arena, Edmonton, Alberta
- Dates: March 7–9
- Teams: 5

Final positions
- Champions: Toronto Varsity Blues (3rd title)
- Runners-up: Sir George Williams Georgians
- Third place: Alberta Golden Bears
- Fourth place: Saint Mary's Huskies

Tournament statistics
- Games played: 6

Awards
- MVP: John Wright (Toronto)

The 1969 CIAU Men's University Cup Hockey Tournament (7th annual) was held at the Varsity Arena in Edmonton, Alberta. The Alberta Golden Bears served as tournament host.

== Road to the Cup ==
=== AIAA playoffs ===
Semifinals
1 | Saint Dunstan's | 2
4 | St. Thomas | 4
2 | Saint Mary’s | 6
3 | Acadia | 4

Championship
4 | St. Thomas | 2
2 | Saint Mary’s | 4

Note: * denotes overtime period(s)

=== OIAA season ===
| Seed | School | Standings | Seed | School | Standings |
|---|---|---|---|---|---|
| 1 | Laurentian | 8–2–0 | 4 | York | 5–5–0 |
| 2 | Waterloo Lutheran | 7–3–0 | 5 | Osgoode Hall | 3–7–0 |
| 3 | Ryerson | 6–4–0 | 6 | Brock | 0–10–0 |

no playoffs

=== OSLC playoffs ===
Semifinals
1 | Loyola | 2
4 | Sir George Williams | 4
2 | Sherbrooke | 4
3 | Bishop's | 5

Championship
4 | Sir George Williams | 3
3 | Bishop's | 2

Note: * denotes overtime period(s)

=== QOAA playoffs ===
Semifinals; February 28
E1 | Laval | 2
W2 | Waterloo | 4
W1 | Toronto | 10
E2 | Carleton | 6

Championship; March 1
W2 | Waterloo | 0
W1 | Toronto | 4

Note: * denotes overtime period(s)

=== WCIAA season ===
| Seed | School | Standings | Seed | School | Standings |
|---|---|---|---|---|---|
| 1 | Alberta | 16–4–0 | T–4 | British Columbia | 10–10–0 |
| 2 | Saskatchewan | 13–7–0 | T–4 | Manitoba | 10–10–0 |
| 3 | Calgary | 11–9–0 | 6 | Winnipeg | 0–20–0 |

No playoff

== University Cup ==
The CIAU invited the champions of five conferences to play for the championship. Alberta and Sir George Williams received byes for the OSLC and WCIAA reaching the championship the previous season. The remaining teams were sorted by committee.

| Team | Qualification | Record | Appearance | Last |
|---|---|---|---|---|
| Alberta Golden Bears | WCIAA Champion | 16–4–0 | 4th | 1968 |
| Laurentian Voyageurs | OIAA Champion | 8–2–0 | 5th | 1968 |
| Saint Mary's Huskies | AIAA Champion | 15–5–0 | 1st | Never |
| Sir George Williams Georgians | OSLC Champion | 11–8–1 | 5th | 1967 |
| Toronto Varsity Blues | QOAA Champion | 15–1–1 | 4th | 1968 |

=== Bracket ===
Consolation Final; March 9
Saint Mary's | 3
Alberta | 5

Consolation Semifinal; March 8
Laurentian | 9
Alberta | 10

Quarterfinal; March 7
Toronto | 6
Laurentian | 3

Semifinals; March 7–8
Sir George Williams | 5
Saint Mary's | 3
Alberta | 2
Toronto | 3

Championship; March 9
Sir George Williams | 2
Toronto | 4

Note: * denotes overtime period(s)

== Championship final ==
| March 9, 1969 | Toronto Varsity Blues | 4–2 | Sir George Williams Georgians | Varsity Arena, Edmonton, Alberta |
