= 2002 CIS University Cup =

Canadian hockey tournament

Tournament details
- Venue(s): Waterloo Recreation Complex, Waterloo, Ontario
- Teams: 6

Final positions
- Champions: Western Ontario Mustangs (1st title)
- Runners-up: Quebec–Trois-Rivières Patriotes

Tournament statistics
- Games played: 7

Awards
- MVP: Mike D'Alessandro (Western Ontario)

The 2002 CIS Men's University Cup Hockey Tournament (40th annual) was held at the Waterloo Recreation Complex in Waterloo, Ontario. The Guelph Gryphons served as primary tournament host with assistance from the Wilfrid Laurier Golden Hawks and Waterloo Warriors.

== Road to the Cup ==
=== AUS playoffs ===
Quarterfinals
3	Moncton	6	0	5
6	St. Francis Xavier	0	2	4
4	New Brunswick	4	7	—
5	Prince Edward Island	2	4	—

Semifinals
1	Dalhousie	6	4	—
4	New Brunswick	3	3	—
2	Saint Mary’s	7	3	—
3	Moncton	2	2	—

Championship
1	Dalhousie	1	3	4	3	1
2	Saint Mary’s	3	2	5	1	2

Note: * denotes overtime period(s)

=== OUA playoffs ===
Division Semifinals
FE2	Quebec–Trois-Rivières	2	2	—
FE3	McGill	0	1	—
ME2	Ryerson	7	3	—
ME3	Royal Military College	4	2	—
MW2	Guelph	3	4	5
MW3	Brock	2	6	6*
FW2	Lakehead	6	3	—
FW3	Windsor	1	1	—

Division Finals
FE1	Ottawa	1	2	—
FE2	Quebec–Trois-Rivières	3	4	—
East
ME1	Toronto	3	5	—
ME2	Ryerson	2	2	—
MW1	York	5	9	—
MW3	Brock	2	4	—
West
FW1	Western Ontario	3	4**	5
FW2	Lakehead	4	3	1

Queen's Cup Semifinals
FE2	Quebec–Trois-Rivières	4*
ME1	Toronto	3
MW1	York	3
FW1	Western Ontario	5

Queen's Cup Final
FE2	Quebec–Trois-Rivières	5
FW1	Western Ontario	4

Note: * denotes overtime period(s)

=== Canada West playoffs ===
Quarterfinal
G2	Manitoba	4	5	—
G3	Regina	2	1	—
M2	Calgary	5	8	—
M3	Lethbridge	0	4	—

Semifinal
M1	Alberta	5	9	—
G2	Manitoba	2	3	—
G1	Saskatchewan	4	7	—
M2	Calgary	1	2	—

Championship
M1	Alberta	5	6	—
G1	Saskatchewan	1	2	—

Note: * denotes overtime period(s)

== University Cup ==
Because the OUA was hosting the tournament and would already receive three bids into the tournament, the rotating wild-card moved to Canada West. In order to prevent both Canada West teams, as well as the Ontario and Quebec entries, from being in the same group, Alberta and UQTR exchanged places.

Seed	Team	Qualification	Record	Appearance	Last
1	Quebec–Trois-Rivières Patriotes	Quebec: OUA Champion	19–8–1	12th	2001
2	Alberta Golden Bears	West: Canada West Champion	25–3–4	27th	2001
3	Western Ontario Mustangs	Ontario: OUA Runner-up	25–2–2	7th	2001
4	Saint Mary's Huskies	Atlantic: AUS Champion	19–10–6	9th	1977
5	Saskatchewan Huskies	Wild-card: Canada West Runner-up	19–10–3	9th	2000
6	Guelph Gryphons	Host	12–14–1	8th	1997

=== Bracket ===
	Pool B	QTR	SMU	SAS	Overall
1	Quebec–Trois-Rivières		W 4–2	W 5–3	2–0
4	Saint Mary's	L 2–4		W 3–1	1–1
5	Saskatchewan	L 3–5	L 1–3		0–2

	Pool A	ALB	UWO	GUE	Overall
2	Alberta		L 1–4	W 8–0	1–1
3	Western Ontario	W 4–1		W 5–2	2–0
6	Guelph	L 0–8	L 2–5		0–2

Championship
1	Quebec–Trois-Rivières	3
3	Western Ontario	4***

Note: * denotes overtime period(s)

== Championship final ==
#1 Quebec–Trois-Rivières Patriotes	3–4 (3OT)	#3 Western Ontario Mustangs	Kitchener Memorial Auditorium, Kitchener, Ontario
