= 1979 CIAU University Cup =

Canadian hockey tournament

Tournament details
- Venue(s): Loyola Arena, Montreal, Quebec
- Dates: March 15–18
- Teams: 6

Final positions
- Champions: Alberta Golden Bears (5th title)
- Runners-up: Dalhousie Tigers

Tournament statistics
- Games played: 7

Awards
- MVP: Dave Hindmarch (Alberta)

The 1979 CIAU Men's University Cup Hockey Tournament (17th annual) was held at the Loyola Arena in Montreal, Quebec. The Concordia Stingers served as tournament host.

== Road to the Cup ==
=== AUAA playoffs ===
Semifinals
1	Saint Mary’s	4	4	4
4	Prince Edward Island	5	2	3
2	Dalhousie	5	4	—
3	Moncton	2	1	—

Championship
1	Saint Mary’s	3	3	4
2	Dalhousie	2	6	5

Note: * denotes overtime period(s)

=== Canada West playoffs ===
Championship; March 10-12
1	Alberta	6	3	3
2	Calgary	4	4	1

Note: * denotes overtime period(s)

=== GPAC playoffs ===
Championship; March 9-10
1	Regina	7	5	—
2	Manitoba	4	1	—

Note: * denotes overtime period(s)

=== OUAA playoffs ===
Quarterfinals; February 20
E1	Toronto	3
C1	McMaster	4*
Eastern
E2	Laurentian	?
E3	York	?
W1	Guelph	?
C2	Windsor	?
Western
W2	Wilfrid Laurier	?
W3	Western Ontario	?

Semifinals
C1	McMaster	?
?	?	?
W1	Guelph	?
W3	Western Ontario	?

Championship
C1	McMaster	?	?	?
W1	Guelph	?	?	?

Note: * denotes overtime period(s)

=== QUAA playoffs ===
Semifinals; February 21-25
1	Concordia	7	6	—
4	McGill	6	2	—
2	Quebec–Chicoutimi	0	11	6
3	Laval	8	3	2

Championship; February 28-March 3
1	Concordia	7	8	8	—	—
2	Quebec–Chicoutimi	5	3	5	—	—

Note: * denotes overtime period(s)

== University Cup ==
The format was unchanged from the year before. As tournament host, the QUAA received two bids to the tournament. The six teams were sorted by a committee prior to the tournament and arranged so that the two QUAA teams would be in opposite brackets.

In the round-robin groups, the teams that finished with the best record would advance to the championship game. If there was a tie for the best record, the first tie-breaker was goal differential. If there was a tie in goal differential, the teams would play sudden death overtime for the advantage.

Team	Qualification	Record	Appearance	Last
Alberta Golden Bears	West: Canada West Champion	22–5–0	12th	1978
Concordia Stingers	Quebec: QUAA Champion / Host	23–2–0	4th	1978
Dalhousie Tigers	Atlantic: AUAA Champion	17–8–0	1st	Never
Guelph Gryphons	Ontario: OUAA Champion	13–4–3	2nd	1976
Quebec–Chicoutimi Inuk	Quebec: QUAA Runner-Up	13–10–3	1st	Never
Regina Cougars	Plains: GPAC Champion	20–4–0	2nd	1978

=== Bracket ===
	Group 1	ALB	CON	REG	Overall
1	Alberta		W 7–1	W 3–1	2–0
4	Concordia	L 1–7		W 8–3	1–1
5	Regina	L 1–3	L 3–8		0–2

	Group 2	DAL	GUE	UQC	Overall
2	Dalhousie		T 5–5	W 7–3	1–0–1
3	Guelph	T 5–5		L 2–7	0–1–1
6	Quebec–Chicoutimi	L 3–7	W 7–2		1–1

Championship; March 18
Alberta	5
Dalhousie	1

Note: * denotes overtime period(s)
Note: round-robin games were played on consecutive days March 15–17

== Championship final ==
March 18, 1979	Alberta Golden Bears	5–1	Dalhousie Tigers	Loyola Arena, Montreal, Quebec
