= 1983 CIAU University Cup =

Canadian hockey tournament

Tournament details
- Venue(s): Jean-Louis Lévesque Arena, Moncton, New Brunswick
- Dates: March 10–13
- Teams: 6

Final positions
- Champions: Saskatchewan Huskies (2nd title)
- Runners-up: Concordia Stingers

Tournament statistics
- Games played: 7

Awards
- MVP: Willie Desjardins (Saskatchewan)

The 1983 CIAU Men's University Cup Hockey Tournament (21st annual) was held at the Jean-Louis Lévesque Arena in Moncton, New Brunswick. The Moncton Aigles Bleus served as tournament host.

== Road to the Cup ==
=== AUAA playoffs ===
Semifinals
1	Moncton	7	9	—
4	Saint Mary’s	3	1	—
2	Dalhousie	3	11	4
3	Mount Allison	5	2	3

Championship
1	Moncton	3	6	7
2	Dalhousie	4	3	3

Note: * denotes overtime period(s)

=== Canada West playoffs ===
Championship; March 4-5
1	Saskatchewan	4	5	—
2	Alberta	1	1	—

Note: * denotes overtime period(s)

=== GPAC playoffs ===
Semifinal; March 1			Championship; March 4-6
			1	Brandon	2	5	8
2	Manitoba	4	2	Manitoba	3	4	2
3	Regina	2

Note: * denotes overtime period(s)

=== OUAA playoffs ===
Quarterfinals; February
3	Wilfrid Laurier	5
6	York	4
4	Queen's	4
5	McMaster	3

Semifinals; February 25–27
1	Toronto	7	4	—
6	Queen's	1	2	—
2	Western Ontario	4	4	4
3	Wilfrid Laurier	2	5	6

Championship; March 3, 5
1	Toronto	4	2	—
3	Wilfrid Laurier	5	4	—

Note: * denotes overtime period(s)

=== QUAA playoffs ===
Semifinals
1	Concordia	9	2	—
4	Quebec–Trois-Rivières	2	1	—
2	Laval	2	2	—
3	Quebec–Chicoutimi	6	6	—

Championship
1	Concordia	10	6	4	6	—
3	Quebec–Chicoutimi	0	1	7	2	—

Note: * denotes overtime period(s)

== University Cup ==
The tournament included the five senior league champions. Because host Moncton was also a champion, a wild-card spot was available. As the previous wild-card had gone the GPAC, it continued its eastern procession and was given to the OUAA (Toronto). The six teams were sorted by a committee prior to the tournament and arranged so that the two OUAA teams would be in opposite groups.

In the round-robin groups, the teams that finished with the best record would advance to the championship game. If there was a tie for the best record, the first tie-breaker was goal differential. If there was a tie in goal differential, the teams would play sudden death overtime for the advantage.

Team	Qualification	Record	Appearance	Last
Brandon Bobcats	Plains: GPAC Champion	18–7–2	5th	1982
Concordia Stingers	Quebec: QUAA Champion	28–8–0	8th	1982
Moncton Aigles Bleus	Atlantic: AUAA Champion / Host	24–4–1	6th	1982
Saskatchewan Huskies	West: Canada West Champion	18–8–0	4th	1982
Toronto Varsity Blues	Wild-card	24–3–1	14th	1982
Wilfrid Laurier Golden Hawks	Ontario: OUAA Champion	24–5–1	1st	Never

=== Bracket ===
	Pool 1	CON	MON	TOR	Overall
1	Concordia		T 4–4	W 4–3	1–0–1
4	Moncton	T 4–4		L 4–6	0–1–1
5	Toronto	L 3–4	W 6–4		1–1

	Pool 2	BRA	SAS	WLU	Overall
2	Brandon		L 2–6	L 4–5	0–2
3	Saskatchewan	W 6–2		W 10–1	2–0
6	Wilfrid Laurier	W 5–4	L 1–10		1–1

Championship; March 13
Concordia	2
Saskatchewan	6

Note: * denotes overtime period(s)
Note: round-robin games were played on consecutive days March 10–12

== Championship final ==
March 13, 1983	Concordia Stingers	2–6	Saskatchewan Huskies	Jean-Louis Lévesque Arena, Moncton, New Brunswick
