= 1977 CIAU University Cup =

Canadian hockey tournament

Tournament details
- Venue(s): Varsity Arena, Edmonton, Alberta
- Dates: March 4–13
- Teams: 6

Final positions
- Champions: Toronto Varsity Blues (9th title)
- Runners-up: Alberta Golden Bears

Tournament statistics
- Games played: 10

Awards
- MVP: Rocci Pagnello (Toronto)

The 1977 CIAU Men's University Cup Hockey Tournament (15th annual) was held at the Varsity Arena in Edmonton, Alberta. The Alberta Golden Bears served as tournament host.

== Road to the Cup ==
=== AUAA playoffs ===
Semifinals
1	St. Francis Xavier	6	4	—
4	Prince Edward Island	3	3	—
2	Saint Mary’s	7	10	—
3	Moncton	2	0	—

Championship
1	St. Francis Xavier	5	2	—
2	Saint Mary’s	6	3	—

Note: * denotes overtime period(s)

=== Canada West playoffs ===
Championship; March 4-6
1	Alberta	4	4	8
2	British Columbia	3	5	3

Note: * denotes overtime period(s)

=== GPAC season ===
Seed	School	Standings
1	Manitoba	17–6–0
2	Regina	13–9–0
T–3	Lakehead	9–12–1
T–3	Winnipeg	9–12–1
5	Brandon	8–16–0

No playoff

=== OUAA playoffs ===
Quarterfinals; February 21–22
E1	York	11
C1	Ryerson	1
W2	Guelph	10
W3	Waterloo	5
W1	Wilfrid Laurier	9
C2	Brock	0
E2	Toronto	4
E3	Laurentian	1

Semifinals; February 25
E1	York	5
W2	Guelph	4
W1	Wilfrid Laurier	1
E2	Toronto	6

Championship; February 26
E1	York	2
E2	Toronto	3

Note: * denotes overtime period(s)

=== QUAA playoffs ===
Semifinals
1	Concordia	12	8	—
4	McGill	1	1	—
2	Quebec–Trois-Rivières	8	8	—
3	Bishop's	3	0	—

Championship
1	Concordia	5	7	—
2	Quebec–Trois-Rivières	1	6	—

Note: * denotes overtime period(s)

== University Cup ==
The tournament format was modified from the previous season by eliminating two rounds of the bracket. First, as Canada West was hosting the tournament, two teams from the conference would receive bids and both were advanced into the semifinal round in opposite brackets. The OUAA took Canada West's place in the western regional, however, only one team from the non-hosting conferences was invited to participate. Due to this, the regional semifinals were eliminated. Additionally, the Championship first round was dispensed with, meaning that the winners of the regional finals would advance directly to the national semifinal.

The regional rounds were played as best of three series while the national semifinals were set as two-game total-goal series. The championship game remained a single elimination match.

West regional games were played in Winnipeg, Manitoba. East regional games were played at the Saint Mary's University Alumni Arena in Halifax, Nova Scotia.

Team	Qualification	Record	Appearance	Last
Alberta Golden Bears	West: Canada West Champion / Host	23–4–0	10th	1976
British Columbia Thunderbirds	West: Canada West Runner-Up	15–12–0	3rd	1971
Concordia Stingers	Quebec: QUAA Champion	21–2–1	2nd	1976
Manitoba Bisons	Plains: GPAC Champion	17–6–0	3rd	1976
Saint Mary's Huskies	Atlantic: AUAA Champion	20–3–1	8th	1975
Toronto Varsity Blues	Ontario: OUAA Champion	15–5–1	11th	1976

=== Bracket ===
Regional Finals; March 4–6
Saint Mary's	5	2	3
Concordia	1	3	2
Toronto	4	7	—
Manitoba	2	4	—

Semifinals; March 11–12
Alberta	5	7	12
Saint Mary's	1	4	5
British Columbia	4	6	10
Toronto	6	5	11

Championship; March 13
Alberta	1
Toronto	4

Note: * denotes overtime period(s)

== Championship final ==
March 13, 1977	Alberta Golden Bears	2–7	Toronto Varsity Blues	Varsity Arena, Edmonton, Alberta
