= 1968 CIAU University Cup =

Canadian hockey tournament

Tournament details
- Venue(s): Montreal, Quebec
- Dates: March 7–10
- Teams: 5

Final positions
- Champions: Alberta Golden Bears (2nd title)
- Runners-up: Loyola Warriors
- Third place: Toronto Varsity Blues
- Fourth place: Laurentian Voyageurs

Tournament statistics
- Games played: 6

Awards
- MVP: Ron Cebryk (Alberta)

The 1968 CIAU Men's University Cup Hockey Tournament (6th annual) was held in Montreal, Quebec. The Loyola Warriors, Macdonald Clansmen and Sir George Williams Georgians served as tournament hosts.

== Road to the Cup ==
=== MIAA playoffs ===
Semifinals
1	St. Francis Xavier	2
4	New Brunswick	1
2	Saint Mary’s	7
3	Acadia	2

Championship
1	St. Francis Xavier	9
2	Saint Mary’s	6

Note: * denotes overtime period(s)

=== OIAA season ===
Seed	School	Standings	Seed	School	Standings
1	Laurentian	10–2–0	T–4	Ryerson	6–6–0
2	York	8–4–0	6	Osgoode Hall	5–7–0
3	Waterloo Lutheran	7–5–0	7	Brock	0–12–0
T–4	Windsor	6–6–0			

no playoffs

=== OSLC playoffs ===
Semifinals
1	Loyola	7
4	Bishop's	1
2	Sherbrooke	5
3	Sir George Williams	7

Championship
1	Loyola	6
3	Sir George Williams	2

Note: * denotes overtime period(s)

=== QOAA playoffs ===
Semifinals; March 1
1	Toronto	4
4	Montreal	3
2	Waterloo	6
3	McMaster	5

Championship; March 2
1	Toronto	8
2	Waterloo	1

Note: * denotes overtime period(s)

=== WCIAA season ===
Seed	School	Standings
1	Alberta	11–5–0
T–2	Saskatchewan	10–6–0
T–2	Manitoba	10–6–0
4	British Columbia	7–9–0
5	Calgary	2–14–0

No playoff

== University Cup ==
The CIAU invited the champions of five conferences to play for the championship. Laurentian and Toronto received byes for the OIAA and QOAA reaching the championship the previous season. The remaining teams were sorted by committee.

Team	Qualification	Record	Appearance	Last
Alberta Golden Bears	WCIAA Champion	11–5–0	3rd	1966
Laurentian Voyageurs	OIAA Champion	10–2–0	4th	1967
Loyola Warriors	OSLC Champion	17–1–0	1st	Never
St. Francis Xavier X-Men	MIAA Champion	16–1–0	4th	1967
Toronto Varsity Blues	QOAA Champion	16–1–1	3rd	1967

=== Bracket ===
Consolation Final; March 10
Laurentian	3
Toronto	5

Consolation Semifinal; March 9
St. Francis Xavier	1
Toronto	9

Quarterfinal; March 7
St. Francis Xavier	3
Alberta	12

Semifinals; March 8
Laurentian	2
Alberta	7
Toronto	0
Loyola	1

Championship; March 10
Alberta	5
Loyola	4

Note: * denotes overtime period(s)

== Championship final ==
March 10, 1968	Loyola Warriors	4–5	Alberta Golden Bears	Montreal, Quebec
