= 1980 CIAU University Cup =

Canadian hockey tournament

Tournament details
- Venue(s): Sherwood Ice Sports Centre, Regina, Saskatchewan
- Dates: March 13–16
- Teams: 6

Final positions
- Champions: Alberta Golden Bears (6th title)
- Runners-up: Regina Cougars

Tournament statistics
- Games played: 7

Awards
- MVP: Chris Helland (Alberta)

The 1980 CIAU Men's University Cup Hockey Tournament (18th annual) was held at the Sherwood Ice Sports Centre in Regina, Saskatchewan. The Regina Cougars served as tournament host.

== Road to the Cup ==
=== AUAA playoffs ===
Quarterfinals
E2 | Saint Mary’s | 4
WC | Mount Allison | 0
W2 | New Brunswick | 4
WC | St. Francis Xavier | 7

Semifinals
W1 | Moncton | 4 | 6 | 5
E2 | Saint Mary’s | 5 | 5 | 4
E1 | Dalhousie | 7 | 1 | 4
WC | St. Francis Xavier | 3 | 3 | 2

Championship
W1 | Moncton | 10 | 6 | —
E1 | Dalhousie | 7 | 0 | —

Note: * denotes overtime period(s)

=== GPAC playoffs ===
| Semifinal; March 3 | | | Championship; March 8-10 |
| | | | 1 | Brandon | 6 | 5 | 3 |
| 2 | Manitoba | 2 | 3 | Regina | 3 | 6 | 5 |
| 3 | Regina | 4 |

Note: * denotes overtime period(s)

=== OUAA playoffs ===
Quarterfinals; February 20
4 | Laurentian | ?
5 | Guelph | ?
3 | McMaster | ?
6 | Waterloo | ?

Semifinals
1 | Toronto | 4 | 2 | 0
5 | Guelph | 3 | 5 | 4
2 | Queen's | ? | ? | ?
? | ? | ? | ? | ?

Championship
5 | Guelph | ? | ? | ?
? | ? | ? | ? | ?

Note: * denotes overtime period(s)

=== QUAA playoffs ===
Semifinals; February 27-29
1 | Quebec–Trois-Rivières | 7 | 8 | —
4 | Bishop's | 2 | 2 | —
2 | Concordia | 5 | 3 | —
3 | Ottawa | 3 | 2 | —

Championship; March 5-7
1 | Quebec–Trois-Rivières | 0 | 5 | —
2 | Concordia | 5 | 8 | —

Note: * denotes overtime period(s)

=== Canada West playoffs ===
| Championship; February 28-March 1 |
| 1 | Alberta | 1 | 0 | — |
| 2 | Calgary | 3 | 2 | — |

Note: * denotes overtime period(s)

== University Cup ==
The format was mostly unchanged from the year before. The only alteration was that the selection committee chose to admit defending national champion and Canada West runner-up Alberta instead of GPAC runner-up Brandon. This was done partially because the two conferences had played an interlocking schedule during the season. The six teams were sorted by a committee prior to the tournament and arranged so that the host and wild card teams would be in opposite brackets.

In the round-robin groups, the teams that finished with the best record would advance to the championship game. If there was a tie for the best record, the first tie-breaker was goal differential. If there was a tie in goal differential, the teams would play sudden death overtime for the advantage.

| Team | Qualification | Record | Appearance | Last |
|---|---|---|---|---|
| Alberta Golden Bears | Wild-card | 20–11–0 | 13th | 1979 |
| Calgary Dinos | West: Canada West Champion | 20–11–0 | 3rd | 1976 |
| Concordia Stingers | Quebec: QUAA Champion | 19–6–2 | 5th | 1979 |
| Guelph Gryphons | Ontario: OUAA Champion | 18–8–3 | 3rd | 1979 |
| Moncton Aigles Bleus | Atlantic: AUAA Champion | 26–5–1 | 3rd | 1978 |
| Regina Cougars | Plains: GPAC Champion / Host | 15–9–0 | 3rd | 1979 |

=== Bracket ===
| | Group 1 | ALB | CAL | CON | Overall |
| 1 | Alberta | | W 2–0 | W 4–3 | 2–0 |
| 4 | Calgary | L 0–2 | | W 5–1 | 1–1 |
| 5 | Concordia | L 3–4 | L 1–5 | | 0–2 |

| | Group 2 | GUE | MON | REG | Overall |
| 2 | Guelph | | L 5–6 | L 2–5 | 0–2 |
| 3 | Moncton | W 6–5 | | L 4–7 | 1–1 |
| 6 | Regina | W 5–2 | W 7–4 | | 2–0 |

| Championship; March 16 |
| Alberta | 7 |
| Regina | 3 |

Note: * denotes overtime period(s)
Note: round-robin games were played on consecutive days March 13–15

== Championship final ==
| March 16, 1980 | Alberta Golden Bears | 7–3 | Regina Cougars | Sherwood Ice Sports Centre, Regina, Saskatchewan |
