= 1965 CIAU University Cup =

Canadian hockey tournament

Tournament details
- Venue(s): Winnipeg, Manitoba
- Dates: March 12–13
- Teams: 4

Final positions
- Champions: Manitoba Bisons (1st title)
- Runners-up: Saint Dunstan's Saints
- Third place: Laurentian Voyageurs
- Fourth place: Sir George Williams Georgians

Tournament statistics
- Games played: 4

Awards
- MVP: none

The 1965 CIAU Men's University Cup Hockey Tournament (3rd annual) was held in Winnipeg, Manitoba. The Manitoba Bisons served as tournament host.

== Road to the Cup ==
=== MIAA season ===
Seed	School	Standings	Seed	School	Standings
1	Saint Dunstan's	10–1–0	5	Mount Allison	4–6–1
2	St. Francis Xavier	9–2–0	6	Dalhousie	3–10–0
3	New Brunswick	7–3–1	7	Acadia	2–8–1
4	St. Thomas	6–5–0	8	Moncton	1–10–0

Note: No playoffs.

=== OIAA playoffs ===
Championship
A1	Laurentian	4
B1	Windsor	2

=== OSLC playoffs ===
Semifinals
1	Ottawa	6
4	Loyola	7
2	Sir George Williams	6
3	Carleton	5

Championship
4	Loyola	5
2	Sir George Williams	6
Third place
1	Ottawa	7
3	Carleton	3

Note: * denotes overtime period(s)

=== WCIAA season ===
Seed	School	Standings
1	Manitoba	10–2–0
T–2	Alberta	7–5–0
T–2	Saskatchewan	7–5–0
4	Calgary	0–12–0

No playoff

== University Cup ==
The CIAU invited the champions of four conferences to play for the championship. The OIAA champion was admitted to the tournament for the first time. Montreal, the QOAA champion, declined to participate, as did all other teams that participated in the conference playoff. As a result, the CIAU did not invite a team from the QOAA.

Team	Qualification	Record	Appearance	Last
Laurentian Voyageurs	OIAA Champion	10–0–0	1st	Never
Manitoba Bisons	WCIAA Champion	10–2–0	1st	Never
Saint Dunstan's Saints	MIAA Champion	10–1–0	1st	Never
Sir George Williams Georgians	OSLC Champion	13–3–0	2nd	1964

=== Bracket ===
Semifinals; March 12
Manitoba	10
Laurentian	4
Saint Dunstan's	4
Sir George Williams	1

Championship; March 13
Manitoba	9
Saint Dunstan's	2
Third Place
Laurentian	8
Sir George Williams	3

Note: * denotes overtime period(s)

== Championship final ==
March 13, 1965	Manitoba Bisons	9–2	Saint Dunstan's Saints	Winnipeg, Manitoba
