= 1970 CIAU University Cup =

Canadian hockey tournament

Tournament details
- Venue(s): Charlottetown Forum, Charlottetown, Prince Edward Island
- Dates: March 5–7
- Teams: 5

Final positions
- Champions: Toronto Varsity Blues (4th title)
- Runners-up: Saint Mary's Huskies
- Third place: York Yeomen
- Fourth place: Loyola Warriors

Tournament statistics
- Games played: 6

Awards
- MVP: Chuck Goddard (Saint Mary's)

The 1970 CIAU Men's University Cup Hockey Tournament (8th annual) was held at the Charlottetown Forum in Charlottetown, Prince Edward Island. The Prince Edward Island Panthers served as tournament host.

== Road to the Cup ==
=== AIAA playoffs ===
Semifinals
1	Saint Mary’s	7
4	St. Thomas	1
2	St. Francis Xavier	8
3	New Brunswick	1

Championship
1	Saint Mary’s	6
2	St. Francis Xavier	5

Note: * denotes overtime period(s)

=== OIAA playoffs ===
Semifinal			Championship
			1	York	8
2	Laurentian	8	2	Laurentian	2
3	Waterloo Lutheran	2

Note: * denotes overtime period(s)

=== OSLC playoffs ===
Semifinals
1	Loyola	8
4	Bishop's	2
2	Sherbrooke	5
3	Sir George Williams	2

Championship
1	Loyola	2
2	Sherbrooke	1

Note: * denotes overtime period(s)

=== QOAA playoffs ===
Semifinals; February 27
E1	Ottawa	3
W2	Waterloo	7
W1	Toronto	11
E2	Montreal	0

Championship; February 28
W2	Waterloo	4
W1	Toronto	7

Note: * denotes overtime period(s)

=== WCIAA playoffs ===
Semifinals; February 20-21
1	Calgary	7	8	—
4	British Columbia	6	1	—
2	Alberta	10	7	—
3	Manitoba	4	5	—

Championship; February 27-28
1	Calgary	2	1	—
2	Alberta	3	3	—

Note: * denotes overtime period(s)

== University Cup ==
The CIAU invited the champions of five conferences to play for the championship. Loyola and Toronto received byes for the OSLC and QOAA reaching the championship the previous season. The remaining teams were sorted by committee.

Team	Qualification	Record	Appearance	Last
Alberta Golden Bears	WCIAA Champion	15–3–0	5th	1969
Loyola Warriors	OSLC Champion	15–0–1	2nd	1968
Saint Mary's Huskies	AIAA Champion	17–1–2	2nd	1969
Toronto Varsity Blues	QOAA Champion	14–1–2	5th	1969
York Yeomen	OIAA Champion	12–0–0	1st	Never

=== Bracket ===
Consolation Final; March 7
Loyola	3
York	7

Consolation Semifinal; March 6
York	12
Alberta	3

Quarterfinal; March 5
Saint Mary's	4
York	1

Semifinals; March 5–6
Loyola	0
Saint Mary's	4
Toronto	8
Alberta	0

Championship; March 7
Saint Mary's	2
Toronto	3

Note: * denotes overtime period(s)

== Championship final ==
March 7, 1970	Toronto Varsity Blues	3–2	Saint Mary's Huskies	Charlottetown Forum, Charlottetown, Prince Edward Island
