= 1973 CIAU University Cup =

Canadian hockey tournament

Tournament details
- Venue(s): Varsity Arena, Toronto, Ontario
- Dates: March 4–17
- Teams: 5

Final positions
- Champions: Toronto Varsity Blues (7th title)
- Runners-up: Saint Mary's Huskies

Tournament statistics
- Games played: 7

Awards
- MVP: Gord Davies (Toronto)

The 1973 CIAU Men's University Cup Hockey Tournament (11th annual) was held at the Varsity Arena in Toronto, Ontario. The Toronto Varsity Blues served as tournament host.

The Championship game was played between two teams that were both undefeated prior to the match. By winning, Toronto became the second undefeated champion in CIAU hockey history.

== Road to the Cup ==
=== AIAA playoffs ===
Semifinals
1	Saint Mary’s	9
4	Prince Edward Island	1
2	Moncton	9
3	Acadia	2

Championship
1	Saint Mary’s	6
2	Moncton	1

Note: * denotes overtime period(s)

=== OUAA playoffs ===
Quarterfinals; February 27–28
E1	Toronto	8
E4	York	2
W2	Waterloo	7
W3	Guelph	0
W1	Western Ontario	7
W4	Windsor	1
E2	Laurentian	5*
E3	Queen's	4

Semifinals; March 2
E1	Toronto	13
W2	Waterloo	2
W1	Western Ontario	5
E2	Laurentian	4

Championship; March 3
E1	Toronto	8
W1	Western Ontario	1

Note: * denotes overtime period(s)

=== QUAA playoffs ===
Semifinals; March 2
1	Sir George Williams	9
4	Sherbrooke	4
2	Loyola	7
3	Bishop's	1

Championship; March 3
1	Sir George Williams	4
2	Loyola	7

Note: * denotes overtime period(s)

=== West ===
==== GPAA season ====
Seed	School	Standings
1	Lakehead	9–3–0
2	Winnipeg	8–4–0
3	Manitoba	4–8–0
4	Brandon	3–9–0

No playoff

==== Canada West season ====
Seed	School	Standings
1	Alberta	17–7–0
T–2	Calgary	16–8–0
T–2	British Columbia	16–8–0
4	Saskatchewan	11–13–0
5	Victoria	0–24–0

No playoff

== University Cup ==
In order to cut down on travel expenses, the WCIAU had split into two conferences in the offseason; the GPAA and Canada West. However, while the champion of both would be invited into the tournament, an arrangement was made where both would play one another in a quarterfinal round that would serve as a de facto championship for Western Canada. The remaining teams were sorted by committee. The Quarterfinal and Semifinal rounds were best of three series and the third place game was discontinued.

Team	Qualification	Record	Appearance	Last
Alberta Golden Bears	West: Canada West Champion	17–7–0	7th	1972
Lakehead Nor'Westers	Plains: GPAA Champion	9–3–0	1st	Never
Loyola Warriors	Quebec: QUAA Champion	15–6–2	4th	1971
Saint Mary's Huskies	Atlantic: AIAA Champion	22–0–0	5th	1972
Toronto Varsity Blues	Ontario: OUAA Champion	20–0–0	8th	1972

=== Bracket ===
West Quarterfinal; March 4–5
Alberta	3	9	—
Lakehead	1	3	—

Semifinals; March 9–10
Toronto	5	5	—
Alberta	2	3	—
Saint Mary's	9	9	—
Loyola	2	6	—

Championship; March 17
Toronto	3
Saint Mary's	2

Note: * denotes overtime period(s)

== Championship final ==
March 17, 1973	Toronto Varsity Blues	3–2	Saint Mary's Huskies	Varsity Arena, Toronto, Ontario
