= 1966 CIAU University Cup =

Canadian hockey tournament

Tournament details
- Venue: Sudbury, Ontario
- Dates: March 3–5
- Teams: 5

Final positions
- Champions: Toronto Varsity Blues (1st title)
- Runners-up: Alberta Golden Bears
- Third place: St. Francis Xavier X-Men
- Fourth place: Laurentian Voyageurs

Tournament statistics
- Games played: 5

Awards
- MVP: Tom Purser (St. Francis Xavier)

The 1966 CIAU Men's University Cup Hockey Tournament (4th annual) was held in Sudbury, Ontario. The Laurentian Voyageurs served as tournament hosts.

== Road to the Cup ==
=== MIAA season ===
Seed	School	Standings	Seed	School	Standings
1	St. Francis Xavier	14–0–0	5	St. Thomas	5–8–1
2	Saint Dunstan's	10–4–0	6	Acadia	3–10–1
3	New Brunswick	9–4–1	7	Dalhousie	3–11–0
4	Mount Allison	9–5–0	8	Moncton	1–12–1

Note: No playoffs.

=== OIAA season ===
Seed	School	Standings	Seed	School	Standings
1	Laurentian	9–0–1	4	Osgoode Hall	4–6–0
2	Waterloo Lutheran	6–2–2	5	Ryerson	3–6–0
3	York	5–4–1	6	Windsor	1–9–0

no playoffs

=== OSLC playoffs ===
Semifinals
1	Sir George Williams	5
4	Royal Military College	4
2	Loyola	7
3	Ottawa	6

Championship
1	Sir George Williams	5
2	Loyola	4

Note: * denotes overtime period(s)

=== QOAA season ===
Seed	School	Standings	Seed	School	Standings
1	Toronto	13–2–1	T–5	Queen's	6–10–0
2	Western Ontario	12–2–2	7	Montreal	5–11–0
3	Waterloo	11–3–2	8	McGill	4–11–1
4	Laval	9–6–1	9	Guelph	2–13–1
T–5	McMaster	6–10–0			

no playoff

=== WCIAA season ===
Seed	School	Standings
1	Alberta	11–1–0
2	Manitoba	8–4–0
3	Saskatchewan	5–7–0
4	Calgary	0–12–0

No playoff

== University Cup ==
The CIAU invited the champions of five conferences to play for the championship. With the field increasing to five teams, the entrants now arranged by a new method; the participants would be arranged into two groupings, last year's finalists and non-finalists. The two groups would be sorted independently with the finalists being given the top two seeds and the non-finalists seeds three through five. The top three seeds would then receive byes into the semifinal round with the top overall seed awaiting the winner of the lone quarterfinal match.

Seed	Team	Qualification	Record	Appearance	Last
1	St. Francis Xavier X-Men	MIAA Champion	14–0–0	2nd	1963
2	Alberta Golden Bears	WCIAA Champion	11–1–0	2nd	1964
3	Laurentian Voyageurs	OIAA Champion	9–0–1	2nd	1965
4	Sir George Williams Georgians	OSLC Champion	16–1–1	3rd	1965
5	Toronto Varsity Blues	QOAA Champion	13–2–1	1st	Never

=== Bracket ===
Quarterfinal; March 3
4	Sir George Williams	7
5	Toronto	9

Semifinals; March 4
1	St. Francis Xavier	4
5	Toronto	6
2	Alberta	10
3	Laurentian	4

Championship; March 5
5	Toronto	8
2	Alberta	1
Third Place
1	St. Francis Xavier	5
3	Laurentian	3

Note: * denotes overtime period(s)

== Championship final ==
March 5, 1966	#3 Alberta Golden Bears	1–8	#5 Toronto Varsity Blues	Sudbury, Ontario
