= 1971 CIAU University Cup =

Canadian hockey tournament

Tournament details
- Venue: Sudbury, Ontario
- Dates: March 11–13
- Teams: 5

Final positions
- Champions: Toronto Varsity Blues (5th title)
- Runners-up: Saint Mary's Huskies
- Third place: Laurentian Voyageurs
- Fourth place: British Columbia Thunderbirds

Tournament statistics
- Games played: 6

Awards
- MVP: Ron Hindson (Saint Mary's)

The 1971 CIAU Men's University Cup Hockey Tournament (9th annual) was held in Sudbury, Ontario. The Laurentian Voyageurs served as tournament host.

== Road to the Cup ==
=== AIAA playoffs ===
Semifinals
1	Saint Mary’s	5
4	Prince Edward Island	1
2	Dalhousie	7
3	St. Francis Xavier	6

Championship
1	Saint Mary’s	8
2	Dalhousie	4

Note: * denotes overtime period(s)

=== OIAA playoffs ===
Semifinal			Championship
			1	Laurentian	5
2	York	8	2	York	3
3	Waterloo Lutheran	1

Note: * denotes overtime period(s)

=== OSLC playoffs ===
Semifinals
1	Loyola	10
4	Sherbrooke	3
2	Quebec–Trois-Rivières	5
3	Bishop's	4

Championship
1	Loyola	3
2	Quebec–Trois-Rivières	1

Note: * denotes overtime period(s)

=== QOAA playoffs ===
Semifinals; February 27
E1	Carleton	5
W2	Toronto	6
W1	Waterloo	3
E2	Queen's	8

Championship; February 28
W2	Toronto	5
E2	Queen's	4

Note: * denotes overtime period(s)

=== WCIAA playoffs ===
Semifinals; February 26-28
1	Manitoba	6	5	—
4	Alberta	4	4	—
2	British Columbia	9	3	7
3	Calgary	1	4	4

Championship; March 5-6
1	Manitoba	3	6	—
2	British Columbia	5	7	—

Note: * denotes overtime period(s)

== University Cup ==
The CIAU invited the champions of five conferences to play for the championship. Saint Mary's and Toronto received byes for the AIAA and QOAA reaching the championship the previous season. The remaining teams were sorted by committee.

Team	Qualification	Record	Appearance	Last
British Columbia Thunderbirds	WCIAA Champion	19–6–0	2nd	1963
Laurentian Voyageurs	OIAA Champion	12–0–0	6th	1969
Loyola Warriors	OSLC Champion	17–2–1	3rd	1970
Saint Mary's Huskies	AIAA Champion	19–1–0	3rd	1970
Toronto Varsity Blues	QOAA Champion	14–3–0	6th	1970

=== Bracket ===
Consolation Final; March 13
Laurentian	7
British Columbia	4

Consolation Semifinal; March 12
Loyola	4
British Columbia	6

Quarterfinal; March 11
Laurentian	6
Loyola	3

Semifinals; March 11–12
Saint Mary's	4
Laurentian	2
Toronto	3
British Columbia	2

Championship; March 13
Saint Mary's	4
Toronto	5

Note: * denotes overtime period(s)

== Championship final ==
March 13, 1971	Toronto Varsity Blues	5–4	Saint Mary's Huskies	Sudbury, Ontario
