= 1978 CIAU University Cup =

Canadian hockey tournament

Tournament details
- Venue(s): Jean-Louis Lévesque Arena, Moncton, New Brunswick
- Dates: March 16–19
- Teams: 6

Final positions
- Champions: Alberta Golden Bears (4th title)
- Runners-up: Toronto Varsity Blues

Tournament statistics
- Games played: 7

Awards
- MVP: Kevin Primeau (Alberta)

The 1978 CIAU Men's University Cup Hockey Tournament (16th annual) was held at the Jean-Louis Lévesque Arena in Moncton, New Brunswick. The Moncton Aigles Bleus served as tournament host.

== Road to the Cup ==
=== AUAA playoffs ===
Semifinals
1	Saint Mary’s	6	6	—
4	Moncton	5	3	—
2	St. Francis Xavier	8	7	—
3	Prince Edward Island	4	5	—

Championship
1	Saint Mary’s	8	4	3	4	2
2	St. Francis Xavier	4	6	4	3	4

Note: * denotes overtime period(s)

=== Canada West playoffs ===
Championship; March 10-12
1	Alberta	4	1	9
2	British Columbia	2	2	1

Note: * denotes overtime period(s)

=== GPAC playoffs ===
Championship; March 3-5
1	Regina	4	3	9
2	Lakehead	5	1	7

Note: * denotes overtime period(s)

=== OUAA playoffs ===
Quarterfinals; February 24
E1	Toronto	11
C2	Ryerson	0
Eastern
E2	York	8
E3	Laurentian	1
W1	Wilfrid Laurier	5
C1	McMaster	4
Western
W2	Western Ontario	9
W3	Windsor	4

Semifinals; February 28
E1	Toronto	8
E2	York	6
W1	Wilfrid Laurier	6
W2	Western Ontario	0

Championship; March 4, 11
E1	Toronto	3	4	—
W1	Wilfrid Laurier	2	1	—

Note: * denotes overtime period(s)

=== QUAA playoffs ===
Semifinals; February 21-24
1	Concordia	8	8	—
4	Bishop's	5	1	—
2	Quebec–Trois-Rivières	4	5	—
3	McGill	2	4	—

Championship; March 1-10
1	Concordia	4	8	4	2	7
2	Quebec–Trois-Rivières	6	2	3	4	4

Note: * denotes overtime period(s)

== University Cup ==
The tournament continued the policy of inviting two teams from the conference that served as host. However, as a change from previous seasons, rather than give the hosting conference byes into the semifinal round, all entrants into the tournament were placed into two round-robin groups. The six teams were sorted by a committee prior to the tournament and arranged so that the two AUAA teams would be in opposite brackets.

In the round-robin groups, the teams that finished with the best record would advance to the championship game. If there was a tie for the best record, the first tie-breaker was goal differential. If there was a tie in goal differential, the teams would play sudden death overtime for the advantage.

Team	Qualification	Record	Appearance	Last
Alberta Golden Bears	West: Canada West Champion	22–5–0	11th	1977
Concordia Stingers	Quebec: QUAA Champion	17–6–0	3rd	1977
Moncton Aigles Bleus	Atlantic: Host	11–11–0	2nd	1976
Regina Cougars	Plains: GPAC Champion	19–7–0	1st	Never
St. Francis Xavier X-Men	Atlantic: AUAA Champion	18–6–3	6th	1976
Toronto Varsity Blues	Ontario: OUAA Champion	22–1–1	12th	1977

=== Bracket ===
	Group 2	TOR	CON	MON	Overall
1	Toronto		W 7–3	W 7–3	2–0
4	Concordia	L 3–7		W 7–3	1–1
5	Moncton	L 3–7	L 3–7		0–2

	Group 1	ALB	SFX	REG	Overall
2	Alberta		W 7–3	W 7–3	2–0
3	St. Francis-Xavier	L 3–7		W 5–0	1–1
6	Regina	L 3–7	L 0–5		0–2

Championship; March 19
Toronto	5
Alberta	6

Note: * denotes overtime period(s)
Note: round-robin games were played on consecutive days March 16–18

== Championship final ==
March 19, 1978	Toronto Varsity Blues	5–6	Alberta Golden Bears	Jean-Louis Lévesque Arena, Moncton, New Brunswick
