= 1972 CIAU University Cup =

Canadian hockey tournament

Tournament details
- Venue: Sherbrooke, Quebec
- Dates: March 16–18
- Teams: 4

Final positions
- Champions: Toronto Varsity Blues (6th title)
- Runners-up: Saint Mary's Huskies
- Third place: Alberta Golden Bears
- Fourth place: British Columbia Thunderbirds

Tournament statistics
- Games played: 4

Awards
- MVP: John Wright (Toronto)

The 1972 CIAU Men's University Cup Hockey Tournament (10th annual) was held in Sherbrooke, Quebec. The Bishop's Gaiters and Sherbrooke Vert et Or served as tournament hosts.

== Road to the Cup ==
=== AIAA playoffs ===
Semifinals
1	Saint Mary’s	4
4	Memorial	2
2	Prince Edward Island	5
3	Dalhousie	3

Championship
1	Saint Mary’s	7
2	Prince Edward Island	1

Note: * denotes overtime period(s)

=== OUAA playoffs ===
Quarterfinals; March 6–7
E1	York	6
E4	Laurentian	1
W2	Guelph	2
W3	McMaster	1
W1	Western Ontario	5
W4	Windsor	2
E2	Toronto	10
E3	Ottawa	1

Semifinals; March 10
E1	York	6
W2	Guelph	2
W1	Western Ontario	2
E2	Toronto	5

Championship; March 11
E1	York	2
E2	Toronto	6

Note: * denotes overtime period(s)

=== QUAA playoffs ===
Semifinals; March 8
1	Loyola	5
4	Bishop's	3
2	Sir George Williams	6
3	Sherbrooke	3

Championship; March 10
1	Loyola	0
2	Sir George Williams	1

Note: * denotes overtime period(s)

=== WCIAA playoffs ===
Play-in; March 3-4
Manitoba	5	7	12
Brandon	4	5	9

Semifinals; March 10-11
W1	Alberta	6
E2	Manitoba	2
E1	Winnipeg	5
W2	Calgary	6

Championship; March 12
W1	Alberta	3
W2	Calgary	1

Note: * denotes overtime period(s)

== University Cup ==
Due to conference realignment, there were now only four leagues playing at the senior level of college hockey. The CIAU now awarded bids to four regions: Atlantic, Quebec, Ontario and Western Canada. The qualifying teams were sorted by committee.

Team	Qualification	Record	Appearance	Last
Alberta Golden Bears	West: WCIAA Champion	20–2–0	6th	1970
Sir George Williams Georgians	Quebec: QUAA Champion	15–6–2	6th	1970
Saint Mary's Huskies	Atlantic: AIAA Champion	17–2–1	4th	1971
Toronto Varsity Blues	Ontario: OUAA Champion	18–1–3	7th	1971

=== Bracket ===
Semifinals; March 16
Toronto	5
Sir George Williams	1
Saint Mary's	4
Alberta	3

Championship; March 18
Toronto	5
Saint Mary's	0
Third Place
Sir George Williams	2
Alberta	5

Note: * denotes overtime period(s)
Note: The third place game took place on March 17.

== Championship final ==
March 18, 1972	Toronto Varsity Blues	5–0	Saint Mary's Huskies	Sherbrooke, Quebec
