= 2001 CIS University Cup =

Canadian hockey tournament

The 2001 CIS Men's University Cup Hockey Tournament (39th annual) was held at the Kitchener Memorial Auditorium Complex in Kitchener, Ontario. The Wilfrid Laurier Golden Hawks served as primary tournament host with assistance from the Guelph Gryphons and Waterloo Warriors.

== Road to the Cup ==
=== AUS playoffs ===
Quarterfinals
3	Dalhousie	2	2	—
6	Saint Mary’s	1	1	—
4	New Brunswick	1	4	4
5	Acadia	5	3	1

Semifinals
1	St. Francis Xavier	1	5	5
4	New Brunswick	4	4	4
2	St. Thomas	7	1	4
3	Dalhousie	3	3	1

Championship
1	St. Francis Xavier	3	9	1
2	St. Thomas	6	1	2

Note: * denotes overtime period(s)

=== OUA playoffs ===
Division Semifinals
FE2	Concordia	2	3	—
FE3	McGill	1	2	—
ME2	Queen's	2	0	—
ME3	Royal Military College	3	5	—
MW2	Brock	1	4	—
MW3	Guelph	2	5	—
FW2	Waterloo	3	3	5
FW3	Wilfrid Laurier	2	4	3

Division Finals
FE1	Quebec–Trois-Rivières	2	8	—
FE2	Concordia	1	2	—
East
ME1	Toronto	10	2	4
ME3	Royal Military College	0	5	1
MW1	York	5	5	—
MW3	Guelph	2	3	—
West
FW1	Western Ontario	3	5	—
FW2	Waterloo	2	2	—

Queen's Cup Semifinals
FE1	Quebec–Trois-Rivières	4
ME1	Toronto	1
MW1	York	3
FW1	Western Ontario	7

Queen's Cup Final
FE1	Quebec–Trois-Rivières	4
FW1	Western Ontario	3

Note: * denotes overtime period(s)

=== Canada West playoffs ===
Division Semifinal
G2	Saskatchewan	6	6	—
G3	Regina	2	4	—
M2	Calgary	1	4	5
M3	Lethbridge	3	3	4

Division Final
G1	Manitoba	3	4	2
G2	Saskatchewan	5	3	0
M1	Alberta	4	8	—
M2	Calgary	0	0	—

Championship
G1	Manitoba	1	1	—
M1	Alberta	3	5	—

Note: * denotes overtime period(s)

== University Cup ==
The rotating wild-card moved to AUS. In order to prevent both AUS teams from being in the same group, Western Ontario and St. Thomas switched places. The teams were then seeded accordingly.

Seed	Team	Qualification	Record	Appearance	Last
1	Alberta Golden Bears	West: Canada West Champion	29–2–2	26th	2000
2	Quebec–Trois-Rivières Patriotes	Quebec: OUA Champion	25–1–2	11th	2000
3	St. Thomas Tommies	Atlantic: AUS Champion	20–11–4	1st	Never
4	Western Ontario Mustangs	Ontario: OUA Runner-up	24–4–0	6th	2000
5	St. Francis Xavier X-Men	Wild-card: AUS Runner-up	23–5–5	7th	1978
6	Wilfrid Laurier Golden Hawks	Host	10–13–4	6th	1992

=== Bracket ===
	Pool A	ALB	UWO	SFX	Overall
1	Alberta		L 3–5	L 3–5	0–2
4	Western Ontario	W 5–3		L 2–5	1–1
5	St. Francis Xavier	W 5–3	W 5–2		2–0

	Pool B	QTR	STT	WLU	Overall
2	Quebec–Trois-Rivières		W 6–1	W 10–4	2–0
3	St. Thomas	L 1–6		L 2–3	0–2
6	Wilfrid Laurier	L 4–10	W 3–2		1–1

Championship
2	Quebec–Trois-Rivières	5
5	St. Francis Xavier	4

Note: * denotes overtime period(s)

== Championship final ==
#2 Quebec–Trois-Rivières Patriotes	5–4	#5 St. Francis Xavier X-Men	Waterloo Recreation Complex, Waterloo, Ontario
