= 1967 CIAU University Cup =

Canadian hockey tournament

Tournament details
- Venue(s): Varsity Arena, Edmonton, Alberta, Father David Bauer Olympic Arena, Calgary, Alberta
- Dates: March 9–11
- Teams: 5

Final positions
- Champions: Toronto Varsity Blues (2nd title)
- Runners-up: Laurentian Voyageurs
- Third place: St. Francis Xavier X-Men
- Fourth place: Saskatchewan Huskies

Tournament statistics
- Games played: 6

The 1967 CIAU Men's University Cup Hockey Tournament (5th annual) was held at the Varsity Arena in Edmonton, Alberta, and the Father David Bauer Olympic Arena in Calgary, Alberta. The Alberta Golden Bears and Calgary Dinos served as tournament hosts.

As of 2024, Toronto's 16–2 win hold the record for both the most goals scored (by one team and overall) and largest margin of victory.

== Road to the Cup ==
=== MIAA season ===
Seed	School	Standings	Seed	School	Standings
1	St. Francis Xavier	13–1–0	5	New Brunswick	5–7–1
2	Saint Dunstan's	10–1–1	6	Dalhousie	3–9–2
3	Mount Allison	8–4–1	7	St. Thomas	3–10–0
4	Acadia	7–7–0	8	Moncton	1–11–1

Note: No playoffs.

=== OIAA season ===
Seed	School	Standings	Seed	School	Standings
1	Laurentian	10–0–1	5	Western Ontario Tech	3–8–1
2	Waterloo Lutheran	9–3–0	6	Osgoode Hall	3–9–0
3	Windsor	7–5–0	7	Ryerson	2–8–0
4	York	6–6–0			

no playoffs

=== OSLC playoffs ===
Semifinals
1	Sir George Williams	8
4	Royal Military College	5
2	Loyola	7
3	Bishop's	2

Championship
1	Sir George Williams	5
2	Loyola	4

Note: * denotes overtime period(s)

=== QOAA playoffs ===
Semifinals; March 3
1	Toronto	10
4	Queen's	1
2	Waterloo	6
3	Western Ontario	2

Championship; March 4
1	Toronto	9
2	Waterloo	4

=== WCIAA playoffs ===
Championship; March 8
Saskatchewan	4
Alberta	3

== University Cup ==
1966–67 Laurentian Voyageurs, national runners-up

The CIAU invited the champions of five conferences to play for the championship. Saskatchewan and Toronto received byes for the WCIAA and QOAA reaching the championship the previous season. The remaining teams were sorted by committee. In order to ensure that all teams would play at least two games, a consolation semifinal was instituted.

Team	Qualification	Record	Appearance	Last
Laurentian Voyageurs	OIAA Champion	10–0–1	3rd	1966
Saskatchewan Huskies	WCIAA Champion	14–3–0	1st	Never
Sir George Williams Georgians	OSLC Champion	16–1–1	4th	1966
St. Francis Xavier X-Men	MIAA Champion	13–1–0	3rd	1966
Toronto Varsity Blues	QOAA Champion	16–1–1	2nd	1966

=== Bracket ===
Consolation Final; March 11
Saskatchewan	2
St. Francis Xavier	8

Consolation Semifinal; March 10
Sir George Williams	3
St. Francis Xavier	6

Quarterfinal; March 9
Sir George Williams	2
Laurentian	4

Semifinals; March 9-10
Saskatchewan	4
Laurentian	7
Toronto	7
St. Francis Xavier	4

Championship; March 11
Laurentian	2
Toronto	16

Note: * denotes overtime period(s)
Note: Consolation games were held in Calgary, all other games were held in Edmonton

== Championship final ==
March 11, 1967	Toronto Varsity Blues	16–2	Laurentian Voyageurs	Varsity Arena, Edmonton, Alberta
