= 2004 CIS University Cup =

Canadian hockey tournament

Tournament details
- Venue(s): Aitken University Centre, Fredericton, New Brunswick
- Teams: 6

Final positions
- Champions: St. Francis Xavier X-Men (1st title)
- Runners-up: New Brunswick Varsity Reds
- Third place: Dalhousie Tigers
- Fourth place: Alberta Golden Bears

Tournament statistics
- Games played: 8

Awards
- MVP: Mike Mole (St. Francis Xavier)

The 2004 CIS Men's University Cup Hockey Tournament (42nd annual) was held at the Aitken University Centre in Fredericton, New Brunswick. The New Brunswick Varsity Reds served as tournament host.

== Road to the Cup ==
=== AUS playoffs ===
Quarterfinals
3	Saint Mary’s	2	4	1
6	St. Thomas	4	1	4
4	Dalhousie	5	2	3
5	Prince Edward Island	6	1	2

Semifinals
1	St. Francis Xavier	1	5	4
6	St. Thomas	2	1	1
2	New Brunswick	4	3	—
3	Dalhousie	5	4	—

Championship
1	St. Francis Xavier	4	3	2	—	—
3	Dalhousie	1	2	1	—	—

Note: * denotes overtime period(s)

=== OUA playoffs ===
Division Quarterfinals
FE2	Quebec–Trois-Rivières	3	4	—
FE3	Concordia	2	0	—
ME2	Queen's	2	7	—
ME3	Royal Military College	1	1	—
MW2	Brock	3	3	—
MW3	Wilfrid Laurier	4	6	—
FW2	Lakehead	5	12	—
FW3	Waterloo	1	1	—

Division Semifinals
FE1	Ottawa	2	8	4
FE2	Quebec–Trois-Rivières	4	1	3
East
ME1	Toronto	9	5	—
ME2	Queen's	2	3	—
MW1	York	7	5	—
MW3	Wilfrid Laurier	2	3	—
West
FW1	Western Ontario	1	4	4
FW2	Lakehead	3	2	5****

Division Finals
FE1	Ottawa	4
ME1	Toronto	2
MW1	York	3
FW2	Lakehead	2

Queen's Cup Final
FE1	Ottawa	2
MW1	York	3

Note: * denotes overtime period(s)

=== Canada West playoffs ===
Division Semifinal
G2	Regina	4	4	—
G3	Manitoba	2	3	—
M2	Calgary	5	1	6
M3	British Columbia	2	3	2

Division Final
G1	Saskatchewan	4	6	—
G2	Regina	2	1	—
M1	Alberta	4	6	—
M2	Calgary	1	0	—

Championship
G1	Saskatchewan	2	1	—
M1	Alberta	5	8	—

Note: * denotes overtime period(s)

== University Cup ==
The rotating wild-card moved to AUS. The teams were ranked with preference given to avoiding intra-conference matches in pool play.

Seed	Team	Qualification	Record	Appearance	Last
1	Alberta Golden Bears	West: Canada West Champion	30–0–2	29th	2003
2	St. Francis Xavier X-Men	Atlantic: AUS Champion	24–7–3	9th	2003
3	York Lions	Ontario: OUA Champion	19–5–4	10th	2003
4	Ottawa Gee-Gees	Quebec: OUA Runner-up	20–6–3	2nd	1985
5	New Brunswick Varsity Reds	Host	16–11–3	8th	2003
6	Dalhousie Tigers	Wild-card: AUS Runner-up	15–19–2	3rd	1986

=== Bracket ===
	Pool A	ALB	OTT	UNB	Overall
1	Alberta		W 7–3	L 5–6	1–1
4	Ottawa	L 3–7		L 2–5	0–2
5	New Brunswick	W 6–5*	W 5–2		2–0

	Pool B	SFX	YOR	DAL	Overall
2	St. Francis Xavier		W 4–0	W 5–0	2–0
3	York	L 0–4		L 2–4	0–2
6	Dalhousie	L 0–5	W 4–2		1–1

Gold Medal Game
2	St. Francis Xavier	3**
5	New Brunswick	2
Bronze Medal Game
1	Alberta	1
6	Dalhousie	4

Note: * denotes overtime period(s)

== Championship final ==
#2 St. Francis Xavier X-Men	3–2 (2OT)	#5 New Brunswick Varsity Reds	Aitken University Centre, Fredericton, New Brunswick
