= Brandon Bobcats men's ice hockey =

- University: Brandon University
- Arena: Brandon, Manitoba
- Colors: Blue and Gold

U Sports tournament appearances
- 1974, 1975, 1981, 1983

Conference tournament champions
- 1981, 1983

Conference regular season champions
- 1974, 1975, 1980, 1981, 1983

The Brandon Bobcats men's ice hockey team was an ice hockey team representing the Brandon University. The team was active in most seasons from 1909 until its permanent suspension in 2002.

== History ==
Brandon College began sponsoring ice hockey in 1909. Originally called the 'Brandon Caps', the team played at the intermediate (tier II) level of college hockey as well as in local junior leagues. They twice competed for the Turnbull Cup, the provincial amateur championship in the 1920s, however, they were eliminated before the championship rounds.

After World War II, Brandon joined the Big Six Intermediate Hockey League (BSIHL), playing in the league for five seasons. In 1954, the team joined the Western Canadian Intercollegiate Athletic Union (WCIAU), playing senior collegiate hockey for the first time. The Caps didn't have much success against the top level of competition so the program returned to the Intermediate level in 1958. The Caps then spent the next 12 seasons in the SouthWest Hockey League (SWHL), winning championships in 1961 and 1969.

Once the school had become a full university and renamed its athletic programs as 'Bobcats', the hockey program was ready to take their second chance at senior hockey. They joined the WCIAU's successor (Western Canadian Intercollegiate Athletic Association) in 1969 and were a far more competitive team then they had been in the 50s. However, just three years later, the conference was split in two to cut down on travel expenses. Brandon was one of the founding members of the Great Plains Athletic Association (soon to be called Great Plains Athletic Conference) along with two schools from Winnipeg and one from Thunder Bay. After finishing last in the inaugural season, the Bobcats jumped to the top of the standings and won consecutive league titles. The championships earned Brandon a pair of trips to the University Cup, however, the team was unable to win any of their games. The early 1980s saw Brandon win two more league titles, this time through a playoff, but they were still unable to make any headway in the national tournament. Brandon finished its time in the GPAC by being barred from the 1985 playoff for making illegal payments to student athletes.

In 1985, the GPAC was down to just three teams that sponsored varsity ice hockey. With the conference on the cusp of losing its qualifying bid for the University Cup, all three teams were accepted into Canada West. This move, while necessary, proved to be disastrous for the Bobcats. For more than a decade, Brandon finished in the bottom half of league standings (often in last place), and didn't play a single playoff game. Even after the conference postseason was expanded in 1998, Brandon had little chance at winning a title and by the early 21st century, the program was on its last legs. Without a single winning record during their time in Canada West, and after consecutive last-place finishes in 2001 and 2002, the school decided to end the program.

== Season-by-season results ==
=== Senior and collegiate play ===
Note: GP = Games played, W = Wins, L = Losses, T = Ties, Pts = Points

Extra-League Champion	National Semifinalist	Conference regular season champions	Conference Division Champions	Conference Playoff Champions

Season	Conference	Regular Season											Conference Tournament Results	National Tournament Results
Season	Conference	Conference						Overall					Conference Tournament Results	National Tournament Results
Season	Conference	GP	W	L	T	Pts*	Finish	GP	W	L	T	%	Conference Tournament Results	National Tournament Results
1949–50	BSIHL	10	1	9	0	2	6th	?	?	?	?	?		
1950–51	BSIHL	10	4	6	0	16	4th	?	?	?	?	?	Lost Semifinal series, 0–3 (Dauphin Kings)	
1951–52	BSIHL	19	6	13	0	12	5th	?	?	?	?	?		
1952–53	BSIHL	20	1	19	0	2	6th	?	?	?	?	?		
1953–54	BSIHL	10	0	10	0	0	6th	?	?	?	?	?		
1954–55	WCIAU	8	2	6	0	4	3rd	?	?	?	?	?		
1955–56	?	?	?	?	?	?	?	?	?	?	?	?		
1956–57	WCIAU	12	1	11	0	2	4th	?	?	?	?	?		
1957–58	WCIAU	12	2	10	0	4	4th	?	?	?	?	?		
1958–59	SWHL	12	8	4	0	16	2nd	?	?	?	?	?		
1959–60	SWHL	9	6	1	2	14	2nd	?	?	?	?	?		
1960–61	SWHL	16	15	1	0	30	1st	?	?	?	?	?	Won Championship	
1961–62	SWHL	20	16	3	1	33	2nd	?	?	?	?	?		
1962–63	SWHL	16	11	4	1	23	2nd	?	?	?	?	?		
1963–64	SWHL	14	8	6	0	16	5th	?	?	?	?	?		
1964–65	SWHL	14	5	9	0	10	T–7th	?	?	?	?	?		
1965–66	SWHL	10	4	6	0	12	8th	?	?	?	?	?		
1966–67	SWHL	8	1	6	1	3	T–11th	?	?	?	?	?		
1967–68	SWHL	7	6	1	0	18	4th	?	?	?	?	?		
1968–69	SWHL	?	?	?	?	?	?	?	?	?	?	?	Won Championship	
Program changed name to 'Brandon Bobcats'
1969–70	SWHL	12	10	2	0	40	2nd	?	?	?	?	?		
Totals								GP	W	L	T	%	Championships	
Regular Season								?	?	?	?	?	1 SWHL Championship	
Conference Post-season								?	?	?	?	?	2 SWHL Championships	
Regular Season and Postseason Record								?	?	?	?	?		

Note: information prior to 1949 are incomplete or missing.

=== Collegiate only ===
Note: GP = Games played, W = Wins, L = Losses, T = Ties, OTL = Overtime Losses, SOL = Shootout Losses, Pts = Points

U Sports Champion	U Sports Semifinalist	Conference regular season champions	Conference Division Champions	Conference Playoff Champions

Season	Conference	Regular Season													Conference Tournament Results	National Tournament Results
Season	Conference	Conference								Overall					Conference Tournament Results	National Tournament Results
Season	Conference	GP	W	L	T	OTL	SOL	Pts*	Finish	GP	W	L	T	%	Conference Tournament Results	National Tournament Results
1969–70	WCIAA	14	7	7	0	–	–	14	5th	14	7	7	0	.500		
1970–71	WCIAA	20	4	16	0	–	–	8	7th ^{†}	20	4	16	0	.200		
1971–72	WCIAA	20	8	12	0	–	–	16	T–5th	22	8	14	0	.364	Lost Play-in series, 9–12 (Manitoba)	
1972–73	GPAA	12	3	9	0	–	–	6	4th	12	3	9	0	.250		
1973–74	GPAC	18	11	7	0	–	–	22	1st	20	11	9	0	.550		Lost West Quarterfinal series, 0–2 (Calgary)
1974–75	GPAC	22	17	5	0	–	–	34	1st	24	17	7	0	.708		Lost West Quarterfinal series, 0–2 (Alberta)
1975–76	GPAC	18	10	8	0	–	–	20	2nd	18	10	8	0	.556		
1976–77	GPAC	24	8	16	0	–	–	16	5th	24	8	16	0	.333		
1977–78	GPAC	24	2	21	1	–	–	5	5th	24	2	21	1	.104		
1978–79	GPAC	24	8	16	0	–	–	16	3rd	24	8	16	0	.333		
1979–80	GPAC	20	13	6	1	–	–	25	1st	23	14	8	1	.630	Lost Championship series, 1–2 (Regina)	
1980–81	GPAC	24	23	1	0	–	–	46	1st	28	25	3	0	.893	Won Championship series, 2–0 (Manitoba)	Lost Pool 1 Round-robin, 3–6 (Calgary), 3–10 (Moncton)
1981–82	GPAC	24	18	5	1	–	–	37	2nd	28	20	7	1	.732	Won Semifinal, 5–4 (Manitoba); Lost Championship series, 1–2 (Regina)	
1982–83	GPAC	24	16	6	2	–	–	34	1st	29	18	9	2	.655	Won Championship series, 2–1 (Manitoba)	Lost Pool 1 Round-robin, 2–6 (Saskatchewan), 4–5 (Wilfrid Laurier)
1983–84	GPAC	24	18	6	0	–	–	36	2nd	28	20	8	0	.714	Won Semifinal, 5–4 (Regina); Lost Championship series, 1–2 (Manitoba)	
1984–85	GPAC	24	12	9	3	–	–	27	3rd	29	20	5	4	.759	Brandon was barred from postseason play for making illegal payments to players.	
1985–86	Canada West	28	13	15	0	–	–	26	5th	28	13	15	0	.464		
1986–87	Canada West	28	10	18	0	–	–	20	6th	28	10	18	0	.357		
1987–88	Canada West	28	8	18	2	–	–	18	6th	28	8	18	2	.321		
1988–89	Canada West	28	6	21	1	–	–	13	7th	28	6	21	1	.232		
1989–90	Canada West	28	12	16	0	–	–	24	6th	28	12	16	0	.429		
1990–91	Canada West	28	7	16	5	–	–	19	8th	28	7	16	5	.339		
1991–92	Canada West	28	1	25	2	–	–	4	8th	28	1	25	2	.071		
1992–93	Canada West	28	3	21	4	–	–	10	8th	28	3	21	4	.179		
1993–94	Canada West	28	5	18	5	–	–	15	8th	28	5	18	5	.268		
1994–95	Canada West	28	8	18	2	–	–	18	7th	28	8	18	2	.321		
1995–96	Canada West	28	6	21	1	–	–	13	8th	28	6	21	1	.232		
1996–97	Canada West	26	5	19	2	–	–	12	8th	26	5	19	2	.231		
1997–98	Canada West	28	10	17	1	–	–	21	6th	30	10	19	1	.350	Lost Division Semifinal series, 0–2 (Manitoba)	
1998–99	Canada West	28	12	13	3	–	–	27	6th	30	12	15	3	.450	Lost Division Semifinal series, 0–2 (Manitoba)	
1999–00	Canada West	28	11	17	0	–	–	22	6th	32	13	19	0	.406	Won Division Semifinal series, 2–0 (Manitoba); Lost Division Final series, 0–2 (Saskatchewan)	
2000–01	Canada West	28	4	21	3	–	–	11	8th	28	4	21	3	.196		
2001–02	Canada West	28	5	20	3	–	–	13	8th	28	5	20	3	.232		
Program Suspended
Totals										GP	W	L	T/SOL	%	Championships	
Regular Season										815	312	460	43	.409	5 GPAC Championships	
Conference Post-season										26	11	15	0	.423	2 GPAC Championships	
U Sports Postseason										8	0	8	0	.000	4 National tournament appearances	
Regular Season and Postseason Record										849	323	483	43	.406		

† Brandon was forced to forfeit 4 games during the season for using an ineligible player.
Totals include only games at senior collegiate level.
Note: Games not counted towards University Cup appearances are not included.
