= Jean-Louis Lévesque Arena =

Arena in Moncton, New Brunswick

Jean-Louis Lévesque Arena Aréna Jean-Louis Lévesque
- Interactive map of Jean-Louis Lévesque Arena; Aréna Jean-Louis Lévesque
- Location: 450 Université Avenue; Moncton, New Brunswick; E1A 3H6
- Coordinates: 46.106633°N 64.792195°W
- Owner: Université de Moncton
- Capacity: 1,516 (1,339 seated)
- Surface: 197' x 85'

Construction
- Opened: 1966

Tenant
- Moncton Aigles Bleus

The Jean-Louis Lévesque Arena (French: Aréna Jean-Louis Lévesque) is an arena in Moncton, New Brunswick, Canada. The arena has only one rink and is home of the Université de Moncton Aigles Bleus hockey team. The Arena has a 60 m x 26 m rink and 1,650 permanent seats.
