= 1964 CIAU University Cup =

Canadian hockey tournament

Tournament details
- Venue(s): Jock Harty Arena, Kingston, Ontario
- Dates: March 13–14
- Teams: 4

Final positions
- Champions: Alberta Golden Bears (1st title)
- Runners-up: Sir George Williams Georgians
- Third place: New Brunswick Red Devils
- Fourth place: Montreal Carabins

Tournament statistics
- Games played: 4

Awards
- MVP: Dave Dies (Sir George Williams)

The 1964 CIAU Men's University Cup Hockey Tournament (2nd annual) was held at the Jock Harty Arena in Kingston, Ontario. The Queen's Gaels and Royal Military College Redmen served as tournament hosts.

== Road to the Cup ==
=== MIAA season ===
Seed	School	Standings	Seed	School	Standings
1	New Brunswick	9–2–0	6	Dalhousie	5–6–1
2	Saint Dunstan's	8–3–0	7	Saint Mary's	4–8–0
3	St. Francis Xavier	9–2–1	8	Mount Allison	2–8–1
4	St. Thomas	7–4–0	9	Nova Scotia Tech	1–10–1
5	Acadia	5–7–0			

Note: No playoffs were held due to the lack of time between the end of the regular season and the start of the University Cup Playoffs. Representatives from UNB, Acadia and Dalhousie voted unanimously to award the top overall seed, New Brunswick, the league championship and advanced them to the national tournament.

=== OSLC playoffs ===
Semifinals
1	Royal Military College	6
4	Loyola	4
2	Ottawa	3
3	Sir George Williams	4

Championship
1	Royal Military College	2
3	Sir George Williams	5

Note: * denotes overtime period(s)

=== QOAA season ===
Seed	School	Standings	Seed	School	Standings
1	Toronto	9–1–2	T–4	Laval	5–5–2
2	Montreal	7–2–3	6	Queen's	3–7–2
3	McMaster	6–5–1	7	Waterloo	1–11–0
T–4	McGill	4–4–4			

no playoff
Note: QOAA champion Toronto declined to participate in the tournament. Montreal was instead offered the bid and accepted.

=== WCIAA season ===
Seed	School	Standings
1	Alberta	7–5–0
T–2	British Columbia	6–6–0
T–2	Manitoba	6–6–0
4	Saskatchewan	5–7–0

Saskatchewan was forced to forfeit 4 games due to using ineligible players.
No playoff

== University Cup ==
The CIAU invited the champions of four conferences to play for the championship. The OIAA petitioned for a bid into the tournament but they were refused entry.

Team	Qualification	Record	Appearance	Last
Alberta Golden Bears	WCIAA Champion	7–5–0	1st	Never
Montreal Carabins	QOAA Runner-Up	7–2–3	1st	Never
New Brunswick Red Devils	MIAA Champion	9–2–0	1st	Never
Sir George Williams Georgians	OSLC Champion	10–4–2	1st	Never

=== Bracket ===
Semifinals; March 13
New Brunswick	3
Alberta	5
Sir George Williams	4
Montreal	1

Championship; March 14
Alberta	9
Sir George Williams	1
Third Place
New Brunswick	8
Montreal	6

Note: * denotes overtime period(s)

== Championship final ==
March 14, 1964	Alberta Golden Bears	9–1	Sir George Williams Georgians	Jock Harty Arena, Kingston, Ontario
