= 2000 CIAU University Cup =

Canadian hockey tournament

Tournament details
- Venue(s): Rutherford Arena, Saskatoon, Saskatchewan
- Dates: March 23–26
- Teams: 6

Final positions
- Champions: Alberta Golden Bears (10th title)
- Runners-up: New Brunswick Varsity Reds

Tournament statistics
- Games played: 7

Awards
- MVP: Kevin Marsh (Alberta)

The 2000 CIAU Men's University Cup Hockey Tournament (38th annual) was held at the Rutherford Arena in Saskatoon, Saskatchewan. The Saskatchewan Huskies served as tournament host.

== Road to the Cup ==
=== AUS playoffs ===
Quarterfinals
1	Saint Mary’s	4	4	6
4	Dalhousie	1	5	2
Kelly Division
2	St. Francis Xavier	1	2	—
3	Acadia	2	4	—
1	St. Thomas	9	5	—
4	Prince Edward Island	2	2	—
MacAdam Division
2	New Brunswick	6	3	—
3	Moncton	5	0	—

Semifinals
1	Saint Mary’s	6	1	1
3	Acadia	2	4	2
1	St. Thomas	6	1	0
2	New Brunswick	2	2	7

Championship
K3	Acadia	4	4	2	3	—
M2	New Brunswick	2	5	3	4	—

Note: * denotes overtime period(s)

=== OUA playoffs ===
Division Semifinals
FE2	McGill	6	4	—
FE3	Concordia	4	2	—
ME2	Toronto	5	2	4
ME3	Queen's	4	4	6
MW2	Laurentian	3	4	—
MW3	York	4	7	—
FW2	Windsor	3	2	—
FW3	Wilfrid Laurier	5	3	—

Division Finals
FE1	Quebec–Trois-Rivières	2	6	5
FE2	McGill	4	0	2
East
ME1	Guelph	3	2	—
ME3	Queen's	4	3	—
MW1	Brock	5	2	7
MW3	York	2	4	8
West
FW1	Western Ontario	1	3	—
FW3	Wilfrid Laurier	0	2	—

Queen's Cup Semifinals
FE1	Quebec–Trois-Rivières	3
ME3	Queen's	1
MW3	York	1
FW1	Western Ontario	5

Queen's Cup Final
FE1	Quebec–Trois-Rivières	3
FW1	Western Ontario	2

Note: * denotes overtime period(s)

=== Canada West playoffs ===
Division Semifinal
G2	Manitoba	2	2	—
G3	Brandon	6	4	—
M2	Calgary	5	5	—
M3	Lethbridge	4	3	—

Division Final
G1	Saskatchewan	6	5	—
G3	Brandon	5	0	—
M1	Alberta	9	3	—
M2	Calgary	3	2	—

Championship
G1	Saskatchewan	7	1	7
M1	Alberta	6	5	3
Third Place
G3	Brandon	2	3	—
M2	Calgary	4	7	—

Note: * denotes overtime period(s)

== University Cup ==
The rotating wild-card moved to Canada West. Due to the conference already advancing two teams due to Saskatchewan acting as host and participating in the conference championship, a third place game was instituted to determine the wild-card qualifier.

All teams were ranked by committee with a preference to avoid intra-conference matches.

Seed	Team	Qualification	Record	Appearance	Last
1	Saskatchewan Huskies	West: Canada West Champion / Host	26–4–3	8th	1999
2	Quebec–Trois-Rivières Patriotes	Quebec: OUA Champion	24–3–4	10th	1999
3	Alberta Golden Bears	Wild-card: Canada West Runner-up	23–5–5	25th	1999
4	Western Ontario Mustangs	Ontario: OUA Runner-up	22–4–4	5th	1995
5	New Brunswick Varsity Reds	Atlantic: AUS Champion	22–13–0	6th	1998
6	Calgary Dinos	Wild-card: Canada West Third place	20–11–3	10th	1996

=== Bracket ===
	Pool A	SAS	UWO	UNB	Overall
1	Saskatchewan		W 3–2	L 4–5	1–1
4	Western Ontario	L 2–3		L 2–3	0–2
5	New Brunswick	W 5–4	W 3–2		2–0

	Pool B	QTR	ALB	CAL	Overall
2	Quebec–Trois-Rivières		L 1–3	W 3–2	1–1
3	Alberta	W 3–1		W 4–2	2–0
6	Calgary	L 2–3	L 2–4		0–2

Championship; March 26
3	Alberta	5**
5	New Brunswick	4

Note: * denotes overtime period(s)
Note: round-robin games were played on consecutive days March 23–25

== Championship final ==
March 26, 2000	#3 Alberta Golden Bears	5–4 (2OT)	#5 New Brunswick Varsity Reds	Rutherford Arena, Saskatoon, Saskatchewan
