= Clare Drake Arena =

Sports venue in Edmonton, Alberta, Canada

Coordinates: 53.5245167°N 113.5283911°W

- Interactive map of Clare Drake Arena
- Former names: Varsity Arena
- Location: Main Campus
- Owner: University of Alberta
- Capacity: 2,700
- Surface: Artificial ice

Construction
- Opened: 1959

Tenant
- Alberta Golden Bears and Pandas (U Sports)

Clare Drake Arena is a 2,700-seat multi-purpose arena in Edmonton, Alberta, Canada. It is home to the University of Alberta Golden Bears and Pandas ice hockey teams and was named after former University of Alberta Golden Bears hockey coach, Clare Drake, who led the Golden Bears to 697 career wins.

== See also ==
- List of Commonwealth Games venues
