= GPAC men's ice hockey tournament =

Great Plains Athletic Conference men's ice hockey tournament
- Conference hockey championship
- Sport: Ice hockey
- Conference: Great Plains Athletic Conference
- Format: Single-elimination
- Played: 1973–1985

The Great Plains Athletic Conference men's ice hockey tournament was an annual conference championship held between member teams.

== History ==
In 1972, the Western Canadian Intercollegiate Athletic Association (WCIAA) decided to divide itself into two separate conferences due to the sizable area that the conference covered. The Great Plains Athletic Association (GPAA) was created and contained teams from the provinces of Ontario and Manitoba. Four years on, then called the Great Plains Athletic Conference (GPAC), Regina joined and expanded the league's footprint. The Conference did not hold a tournament until 1978. Prior to that, the league's automatic bid went to the regular season champion.

Unfortunately, the conference proved to rather unsuccessful. From its founding, the GPAC champion received a berth in the University Cup tournament, however, the league was by far the least successful of any in Canada. Over the course of 13 tournaments, all GPAC teams combined to go 3–27 in tournament play.

Though the lackluster play on the national state was an issue, a bigger problem for the conference was the poor play from two of its member teams. Winnipeg finished last in the standings seven times in twelve years and never one made a playoff appearance. By the mid-80s, the school was fed up by the Wesmen's ineptitude on the ice and they suspended their program in 1984. A year later, Lakehead cancelled its program after going winless in 24 games. With just three member teams left, the ice hockey division of the conference was in jeopardy of losing its automatic bid. That summer, Canada West, the other conference that had been spawned from the WCIAA, agreed to absorb all three programs. The GPAC continued on for another 16 years before dissolving in 2001.

Canada's Great Plains Athletic Conference is not be confused with the two American conferences of the same name. Neither of which have ever supported ice hockey.

== Tournaments ==
=== 1973 ===
Seed	School	Standings
1	Lakehead	9–3–0
2	Winnipeg	8–4–0
3	Manitoba	4–8–0
4	Brandon	3–9–0

No playoff

=== 1974 ===
Seed	School	Standings
1	Brandon	11–7–0
2	Winnipeg	10–8–0
3	Manitoba	9–9–0
4	Lakehead	6–12–0

No playoff

=== 1975 ===
Seed	School	Standings
1	Brandon	17–5–0
2	Manitoba	13–8–1
3	Lakehead	7–9–1
4	Winnipeg	3–18–0

No playoff

=== 1976 ===
Seed	School	Standings
1	Manitoba	11–7–0
2	Brandon	10–8–0
3	Lakehead	8–10–0
4	Winnipeg	7–11–0

No playoff

=== 1977 ===
Seed	School	Standings
1	Manitoba	17–6–0
2	Regina	13–9–0
T–3	Lakehead	9–12–1
T–3	Winnipeg	9–12–1
5	Brandon	8–16–0

No playoff

=== 1978 ===
Seed	School	Standings
1	Regina	18–4–0
2	Lakehead	16–6–0
3	Manitoba	13–11–0
4	Winnipeg	8–15–1
5	Brandon	2–21–1

Championship; March 3-5
1	Regina	4	3	9
2	Lakehead	5	1	7

Note: * denotes overtime period(s)

=== 1979 ===
Seed	School	Standings
1	Regina	18–4–0
2	Manitoba	18–5–1
3	Brandon	8–16–0
4	Lakehead	7–14–1
5	Winnipeg	6–18–0

Championship; March 9-10
1	Regina	7	5	-
2	Manitoba	4	1	-

Note: * denotes overtime period(s)

=== 1980 ===
Seed	School	Standings
1	Brandon	13–6–1
2	Manitoba	12–7–1
3	Regina	12–8–0
4	Lakehead	5–15–0
5	Winnipeg	1–19–0

Note: The GPAC played an interlocking schedule with Canada West.

Semifinal; March 3			Championship; March 8-10
			1	Brandon	6	5	3
2	Manitoba	2	3	Regina	3	6	5
3	Regina	4

Note: * denotes overtime period(s)

=== 1981 ===
Seed	School	Standings
1	Brandon	23–1–0
2	Manitoba	16–8–0
3	Regina	13–11–0
4	Winnipeg	6–18–0
5	Lakehead	2–22–0

Semifinal; March 2			Championship; March 6-7
			1	Brandon	6	7	-
2	Manitoba	5	2	Manitoba	3	4	-
3	Regina	3

Note: * denotes overtime period(s)

=== 1982 ===
Seed	School	Standings
1	Regina	21–3–0
2	Brandon	18–5–1
3	Manitoba	8–13–3
4	Lakehead	7–15–2
5	Winnipeg	3–21–0

Semifinal; March 2			Championship; March 5-7
			1	Regina	1	4	3
2	Brandon	5	2	Brandon	2	3	2
3	Manitoba	4

Note: * denotes overtime period(s)

=== 1983 ===
Seed	School	Standings
1	Brandon	16–6–2
2	Manitoba	15–7–2
3	Regina	13–11–0
4	Lakehead	10–14–0
5	Winnipeg	3–19–2

Semifinal; March 1			Championship; March 4-6
			1	Brandon	2	5	8
2	Manitoba	4	2	Manitoba	3	4	2
3	Regina	2

Note: * denotes overtime period(s)

=== 1984 ===
Seed	School	Standings
1	Manitoba	19–4–1
2	Brandon	18–6–0
3	Regina	10–14–0
4	Lakehead	9–14–1
5	Winnipeg	3–21–0

Semifinal; February 28			Championship; March 2-4
			1	Manitoba	4	9	8
2	Brandon	5	2	Brandon	5	5	5
3	Regina	4

Note: * denotes overtime period(s)

=== 1985 ===
Seed	School	Standings
1	Manitoba	17–3–4
2	Regina	15–8–1
3	Brandon	12–9–3
4	Lakehead	0–24–0

Note: Brandon was barred from the playoffs for making illegal payments to its athletes.

Semifinal; February 22-23					Championship; March 1-2
					1	Manitoba	3	8	-
2	Regina	8	8	-	2	Regina	2	2	-
3	Lakehead	2	1	-

Note: * denotes overtime period(s)

== Championships ==
School	Championships
Brandon	4
Manitoba	4
Regina	4
Lakehead	1

== See also ==
- WCIAU men's ice hockey tournament
- WCIAA men's ice hockey tournament
- Canada West men's ice hockey tournament
