= 1996 CIAU University Cup =

Canadian hockey tournament

Tournament details
- Venue(s): Maple Leaf Gardens & Varsity Arena, Toronto, Ontario
- Dates: March 9–10
- Teams: 4

Final positions
- Champions: Acadia Axemen (2nd title)
- Runners-up: Waterloo Warriors

Tournament statistics
- Games played: 3

Awards
- MVP: Greg Clancy (Acadia)

The 1996 CIAU Men's University Cup Hockey Tournament (34th annual) was held at the Maple Leaf Gardens and Varsity Arena in Toronto, Ontario. The Toronto Varsity Blues served as tournament host.

== Road to the Cup ==
=== AUAA playoffs ===
Quarterfinals
1	Acadia	3	10	—
4	Saint Mary’s	2	2	—
Kelly Division
2	St. Francis Xavier	1	3	—
3	Dalhousie	2	4	—
1	St. Thomas	2	7	1
4	Moncton	3	3	5
MacAdam Division
2	New Brunswick	1	9	0
3	Prince Edward Island	8	5	1

Semifinals
1	Acadia	7	2	3
3	Dalhousie	3	5	2
4	Moncton	6	2	—
3	Prince Edward Island	8	3	—

Championship
K1	Acadia	7	3	7
M3	Prince Edward Island	6	4	6

Note: * denotes overtime period(s)

=== OUAA playoffs ===
Division Semifinals
FE2	McGill	3
FE3	Ottawa	5
ME2	Toronto	5
ME3	Royal Military College	2
MW2	York	3
MW3	Brock	4*
FW2	Western Ontario	4
FW3	Windsor	5**

Division Finals
FE1	Quebec–Trois-Rivières	1	6	4**
FE3	Ottawa	5	4	3
East
ME1	Guelph	6	2	5
ME2	Toronto	0	3**	3
MW1	Laurentian	8	5	—
MW3	Brock	4	2	—
West
FW1	Waterloo	6	4	—
FW3	Windsor	4	1	—

Queen's Cup Semifinals
FE1	Quebec–Trois-Rivières	4
ME1	Guelph	2
MW1	Laurentian	1
FW1	Waterloo	4

Queen's Cup Final
FE1	Quebec–Trois-Rivières	1
FW1	Waterloo	5

Note: * denotes overtime period(s)

=== Canada West playoffs ===
Division Semifinal
G2	Regina	6	7	4
G3	Saskatchewan	3	8*	2
M2	Alberta	5	8	?
M3	Lethbridge	6*	2	?

Division Final
G1	Manitoba	3	8	1
G2	Regina	7	2	3
M1	Calgary	5	2	—
M2	Alberta	3	0	—

Championship
G2	Regina	5	3	—
M1	Calgary	7	4**	—

Note: * denotes overtime period(s)

== University Cup ==
The bracket matches rotated so that the Atlantic entry played the Quebec entry while the Ontario entry played the Western entry in the semifinals. All rounds were single elimination.

The semifinals were held at the Varsity Arena while the championship took place at the Maple Leaf Gardens.

Team	Qualification	Record	Appearance	Last
Acadia Axemen	Atlantic: AUAA Champion	25–8–1	4th	1994
Calgary Dinos	West: Canada West Champion	22–9–1	9th	1995
Quebec–Trois-Rivières Patriotes	Quebec: OUAA Runner-up	23–7–0	7th	1992
Waterloo Warriors	Ontario: OUAA Champion	25–5–0	3rd	1991

=== Bracket ===
Semifinals; March 9
A	Acadia	4
Q	Quebec–Trois-Rivières	3
O	Waterloo	5
W	Calgary	2

Championship; March 10
A	Acadia	3
Q	Waterloo	2

Note: * denotes overtime period(s)

== Championship final ==
March 10, 1996	Acadia Axemen	3–2	Waterloo Warriors	Maple Leaf Gardens, Toronto, Ontario
