= 1995 CIAU University Cup =

Canadian hockey tournament

Tournament details
- Venue(s): Maple Leaf Gardens & Varsity Arena, Toronto, Ontario
- Dates: March 10–12
- Teams: 4

Final positions
- Champions: Moncton Aigles Bleus (4th title)
- Runners-up: Guelph Gryphons

Tournament statistics
- Games played: 3

Awards
- MVP: Dominic Rhéaume (Moncton)

The 1995 CIAU Men's University Cup Hockey Tournament (33rd annual) was held at the Maple Leaf Gardens and Varsity Arena in Toronto, Ontario. The Toronto Varsity Blues served as tournament host.

== Road to the Cup ==
=== AUAA playoffs ===
Quarterfinals
1	Acadia	8	7	—
4	St. Francis Xavier	2	0	—
Kelly Division
2	Dalhousie	8	11	—
3	Saint Mary’s	1	3	—
1	New Brunswick	3	4	3
4	St. Thomas	4	2	9
MacAdam Division
2	Moncton	4	6	—
3	Prince Edward Island	2	5	—

Semifinals
1	Acadia	3	7	4
2	Dalhousie	6	3	1
4	St. Thomas	2	4	—
2	Moncton	3	7	—

Championship
K1	Acadia	4	3	—
M2	Moncton	5	4	—

Note: * denotes overtime period(s)

=== OUAA playoffs ===
Division Semifinal
FE2	McGill	3
FE3	Concordia	1
ME2	Toronto	5
ME3	Queen's	4
MW2	York	5
MW3	Laurentian	3
FW2	Wilfrid Laurier	5
FW3	Waterloo	6

Division Final
FE1	Quebec–Trois-Rivières	1	6	6
FE2	McGill	2	3	5
East
ME1	Guelph	7	3	—
ME2	Toronto	3	1	—
MW1	Brock	9	3	3
MW2	York	0	6	5
West
FW1	Western Ontario	6	3	—
FW3	Waterloo	3	1	—

Queen's Cup Semifinals
FE1	Quebec–Trois-Rivières	1
ME1	Guelph	3
MW2	York	2
FW1	Western Ontario	7

Queen's Cup Final
ME1	Guelph	4
FW1	Western Ontario	5

Note: * denotes overtime period(s)

=== Canada West playoffs ===
Semifinal; February 24-25
1	Calgary	3	5	—
4	Lethbridge	2	1	—
2	Regina	2	3	—
3	Manitoba	5	4	—

Championship; March 3-4
1	Calgary	4	7	—
3	Manitoba	3	2	—

Note: * denotes overtime period(s)

== University Cup ==
The bracket matches rotated so that the Atlantic entry played the Ontario entry while the Quebec entry played the Western entry in the semifinals. All rounds were single elimination.

The semifinals were held at the Varsity Arena while the championship took place at the Maple Leaf Gardens.

Team	Qualification	Record	Appearance	Last
Calgary Dinos	West: Canada West Champion	24–6–2	8th	1990
Guelph Gryphons	Quebec: OUAA Runner-up	19–8–3	6th	1994
Moncton Aigles Bleus	Atlantic: AUAA Champion	21–7–4	10th	1990
Western Ontario Mustangs	Ontario: OUAA Champion	20–6–2	4th	1994

=== Bracket ===
Semifinals; March 10
A	Moncton	5
O	Western Ontario	4
Q	Guelph	4
W	Calgary	1

Championship; March 12
A	Moncton	5
Q	Guelph	1

Note: * denotes overtime period(s)

== Championship final ==
March 12, 1995	Moncton Aigles Bleus	5–1	Guelph Gryphons	Maple Leaf Gardens, Toronto, Ontario
