= 1993 CIAU University Cup =

Canadian hockey tournament

Tournament details
- Venue(s): Maple Leaf Gardens & Varsity Arena, Toronto, Ontario
- Dates: March 19–21
- Teams: 4

Final positions
- Champions: Acadia Axemen (1st title)
- Runners-up: Toronto Varsity Blues

Tournament statistics
- Games played: 3

Awards
- MVP: George Dupont (Acadia)

The 1993 CIAU Men's University Cup Hockey Tournament (31st annual) was held at the Maple Leaf Gardens and Varsity Arena in Toronto, Ontario. The Toronto Varsity Blues served as tournament host.

== Road to the Cup ==
=== AUAA playoffs ===
Quarterfinals
1	Acadia	2	9	14
4	Cape Breton	3*	2	2
Kelly Division
2	Dalhousie	5	5	—
3	Saint Mary’s	3	4	—
1	New Brunswick	8	4	—
4	Prince Edward Island	0	3	—
MacAdam Division
2	Moncton	2	7	6
3	St. Thomas	4	4	4

Semifinals
1	Acadia	6	4	—
2	Dalhousie	2	0	—
1	New Brunswick	9	5*	—
2	Moncton	7	4	—

Championship
K1	Acadia	3	6	—
M1	New Brunswick	1	0	—

Note: * denotes overtime period(s)

=== OUAA playoffs ===
First Round
E4	McGill	3
E5	Concordia	2
E3	Quebec–Trois-Rivières	3
E6	Queen's	4
W4	Western Ontario	4
W5	Windsor	8
W3	Waterloo	10
W6	Laurentian	4

Queen's Cup Quarterfinals
E1	Ottawa	3	3	—
E4	McGill	2	2	—
East
E2	Toronto	4	2	11
E6	Queen's	1	5	2
W1	Guelph	5	4	—
W5	Windsor	4	1	—
West
W2	Wilfrid Laurier	4	1	4
W3	Waterloo	2	7	11

Queen's Cup Semifinals
E1	Ottawa	4	4	—
E2	Toronto	5	6	—
W1	Guelph	5	1	4
W3	Waterloo	3	6	2

Queen's Cup Final
E2	Toronto	5
W1	Guelph	4

Note: * denotes overtime period(s)

=== Canada West playoffs ===
Semifinal
1	Alberta	4	5	—
4	Saskatchewan	3	4	—
2	Regina	2	6	4
3	Calgary	4	2	1

Championship
1	Alberta	5	3	—
2	Regina	1	1	—

Note: * denotes overtime period(s)

== University Cup ==
The bracket matches rotated so that the Atlantic entry played the Western entry while the Ontario entry played the Quebec entry in the semifinals. All rounds were single elimination.

The semifinals were held at the Varsity Arena while the championship took place at the Maple Leaf Gardens.

Team	Qualification	Record	Appearance	Last
Acadia Axemen	Atlantic: AUAA Champion	28–3–2	2nd	1992
Alberta Golden Bears	West: Canada West Champion	22–6–4	21st	1992
Guelph Gryphons	Quebec: OUAA Runner-up	20–7–1	4th	1980
Toronto Varsity Blues	Ontario: OUAA Champion	20–7–1	17th	1985

=== Bracket ===
Semifinals; March 14
A	Acadia	9
W	Alberta	4
O	Toronto	3
Q	Guelph	2

Championship; March 15
A	Acadia	12
O	Toronto	1

Note: * denotes overtime period(s)

== Championship final ==
March 21, 1993	Acadia Axemen	12–1	Toronto Varsity Blues	Maple Leaf Gardens, Toronto, Ontario
