= 1992 CIAU University Cup =

Canadian hockey tournament

Tournament details
- Venue(s): Varsity Arena, Toronto, Ontario
- Dates: March 14–15
- Teams: 4

Final positions
- Champions: Alberta Golden Bears (8th title)
- Runners-up: Acadia Axemen

Tournament statistics
- Games played: 3

Awards
- MVP: Garth Premak (Alberta)

The 1992 CIAU Men's University Cup Hockey Tournament (30th annual) was held at the Varsity Arena in Toronto, Ontario. The Toronto Varsity Blues served as tournament host.

== Road to the Cup ==
=== AUAA playoffs ===
Quarterfinals
1	Acadia	7	6	—
4	St. Francis Xavier	0	2	—
Kelly Division
2	Dalhousie	5	6	9
3	Saint Mary’s	6	1	1
1	New Brunswick	4	3	—
4	Moncton	2	2	—
MacAdam Division
2	Prince Edward Island	5	3	—
3	St. Thomas	3	2	—

Semifinals
1	Acadia	3	5	6
2	Dalhousie	5	4	3
1	New Brunswick	5	3	—
2	Prince Edward Island	6	4	—

Championship
K1	Acadia	12	4	—
M2	Prince Edward Island	1	3	—

Note: * denotes overtime period(s)

=== OUAA playoffs ===
Queen's Cup Quarterfinals
E1	Quebec–Trois-Rivières	5	6	—
E4	York	2	3	—
East
E2	McGill	4	2	1
E3	Toronto	2	4	2
W1	Western Ontario	3	3	—
W4	Wilfrid Laurier	4	4	—
West
W2	Waterloo	1	4	3
W3	Guelph	2	2	6

Queen's Cup Semifinals
E1	Quebec–Trois-Rivières	4	8	6
E3	Toronto	5	3	1
W4	Wilfrid Laurier	2	4	7
W3	Guelph	3	2	4

Queen's Cup Final
E1	Quebec–Trois-Rivières	8
W4	Wilfrid Laurier	2

Note: * denotes overtime period(s)

=== Canada West playoffs ===
Semifinal
1	Regina	7	8	—
4	Manitoba	6	1	—
2	Alberta	?	6	6
3	Calgary	?	5	4

Championship
1	Regina	3	3	—
2	Alberta	5	4	—

Note: * denotes overtime period(s)

== University Cup ==
The bracket matches rotated so that the Atlantic entry played the Ontario entry while the Quebec entry played the Western entry in the semifinals. All rounds were single elimination.

Team	Qualification	Record	Appearance	Last
Acadia Axemen	Atlantic: AUAA Champion	24–5–2	1st	Never
Alberta Golden Bears	West: Canada West Champion	21–7–5	20th	1991
Quebec–Trois-Rivières Patriotes	Quebec: OUAA Champion	23–4–1	6th	1991
Wilfrid Laurier Golden Hawks	Ontario: OUAA Runner-up	17–8–2	5th	1990

=== Bracket ===
Semifinals; March 14
A	Acadia	5
Q	Wilfrid Laurier	2
O	Quebec–Trois-Rivières	1
W	Alberta	9

Championship; March 15
A	Acadia	2
W	Alberta	5

Note: * denotes overtime period(s)

== Championship final ==
March 15, 1992	Acadia Axemen	2–5	Alberta Golden Bears	Varsity Arena, Toronto, Ontario
