= MIAA men's ice hockey tournament =

Maritime Intercollegiate Athletic Association men's ice hockey tournament
- Conference hockey championship
- Sport: Ice hockey
- Conference: Maritime Intercollegiate Athletic Association
- Format: Single-elimination
- Played: 1920–1968

The Maritime Intercollegiate Athletic Association ice hockey tournament was an annual conference championship held between member teams.

== History ==
The conference was formed once the maritime schools restarted their ice hockey programs after World War I. For the inaugural season, the league instituted a tournament and held it after every season until 1964, when scheduling conflicts with the University Cup caused its cancellation. The league rebranded as the 'Atlantic Intercollegiate Athletic Association' (AIAA) in 1968.

== Tournaments ==
=== 1920 ===
East			West		
Seed	School	Standings	Seed	School	Standings
1	Acadia	?	?	St. Francis Xavier	?
2	Mount Allison	?	?	King's	?
3	New Brunswick	?			

Semifinal (Best of 3)	Championship (Single Game)
	E	Acadia	8
St. Francis Xavier	W	St. Francis Xavier	3
King's

Note: * denotes overtime period(s)

=== 1921 ===
East			West		
Seed	School	Standings	Seed	School	Standings
1	Dalhousie	2–0	1	New Brunswick	2–0
2	St. Francis Xavier	1–1	2	Acadia	1–1
3	King's	0–2	3	Mount Allison	0–2

Championship
E	Dalhousie	3
W	New Brunswick	0

Note: * denotes overtime period(s)

=== 1922 ===
East			West		
Seed	School	Standings	Seed	School	Standings
1	Dalhousie	?	1	New Brunswick	?
2	King's	?	2	Mount Allison	?
3	St. Francis Xavier	?	3	Acadia ^{†}	?

† Acadia withdrew from consideration.

Quarterfinal
W1	New Brunswick	0
W2	Mount Allison	3

Semifinals
E2	King's	3
W2	Mount Allison	6
E1	Dalhousie	6
E3	St. Francis Xavier	3

Championship
W2	Mount Allison	3
E1	Dalhousie	6

Note: * denotes overtime period(s)

=== 1923 ===
East			West		
Seed	School	Standings	Seed	School	Standings
1	Dalhousie	1–0 ^{†}	1	New Brunswick	1–1
2	King's	1–0 ^{†}	T–2	Acadia	1–1 ^{‡}
3	St. Francis Xavier	0–2	T–2	Mount Allison	1–1 ^{‡}

† Dalhousie and King's played an exhibition game to determine seeding after StFX had been eliminated.
‡ Arcadia and Mount Allison refused to play a play-in game and were eliminated from competition.

Semifinal			Championship
			E1	Dalhousie	8
W1	New Brunswick	7	W1	New Brunswick	1
E2	King's	5

Note: * denotes overtime period(s)

=== 1924 ===
East			West		
Seed	School	Standings	Seed	School	Standings
1	St. Francis Xavier	3–0	1	Acadia	2–0
?	Dalhousie	?	2	New Brunswick	1–1
?	King's	?	3	Mount Allison	0–2
?	Nova Scotia Tech	?			

Championship
E	St. Francis Xavier	6
W	Acadia	2

Note: * denotes overtime period(s)

=== 1925 ===
East			West		
Seed	School	Standings	Seed	School	Standings
?	St. Francis Xavier	?	1 ^{†}	New Brunswick	1–0–1
?	Dalhousie	?	2	Mount Allison	1–0–1
?	King's	?	3	Acadia	0–2
?	Nova Scotia Tech	?			

† New Brunswick won a play-in game against Mount Allison.

Championship
E	St. Francis Xavier	4
W	New Brunswick	5

Note: * denotes overtime period(s)

=== 1926 ===
East			West		
Seed	School	Standings	Seed	School	Standings
1	St. Francis Xavier	3–0	1	Acadia	1–1
2	King's	?	2	New Brunswick	1–1
3	Nova Scotia Tech	?	3	Mount Allison	1–1

Semifinals
E1	St. Francis Xavier	2
E2	King's	0
W1	Acadia	2
W2	New Brunswick	5

Championship
E1	St. Francis Xavier	3
W2	New Brunswick	2

Note: * denotes overtime period(s)

=== 1927 ===
East			West		
Seed	School	Standings	Seed	School	Standings
?	St. Francis Xavier	?	1	Mount Allison	2–0
?	King's	?	2	New Brunswick	1–1
?	Nova Scotia Tech	?	3	Dalhousie	0–2

Championship
E1	St. Francis Xavier	1
W1	Mount Allison	0

Note: * denotes overtime period(s)

=== 1928 ===
East			West		
Seed	School	Standings	Seed	School	Standings
1	St. Francis Xavier	3–0	1	New Brunswick	2–0
?	King's	?	2	Mount Allison	1–1
?	Nova Scotia Tech	?	3	Dalhousie	0–2

Championship
E1	St. Francis Xavier	3
W1	New Brunswick	1

Note: * denotes overtime period(s)

=== 1929 ===
East			West		
Seed	School	Standings	Seed	School	Standings
1	St. Francis Xavier	2–0	1	New Brunswick	2–0
?	King's	?	2	Mount Allison	0–2
?	Nova Scotia Tech	?			

Championship (2 games-total goals)
E1	St. Francis Xavier	6	4	10
W1	New Brunswick	1	4	5

Note: * denotes overtime period(s)

=== 1930 ===
East			West		
Seed	School	Standings	Seed	School	Standings
Missing information

Quarterfinals
St. Francis Xavier	3
Acadia	2

Semifinals
E1	Saint Mary's	3
St. Francis Xavier	1
New Brunswick	3	0
Mount Allison	2	0

Championship
E1	Saint Mary's	2
New Brunswick	0

The Eastern semifinal was a single-elimination game while the western semifinal was a 2-game total-goal series
Note: * denotes overtime period(s)

=== 1931 ===
East			West		
Seed	School	Standings	Seed	School	Standings
Missing information

Quarterfinals
St. Francis Xavier	5
Acadia	1

Semifinals
E1	Saint Mary's	2
St. Francis Xavier	3
New Brunswick	3	0
Mount Allison	4	3

Championship
St. Francis Xavier	0
Mount Allison	1

The Eastern semifinal was a single-elimination game while the western semifinal was a 2-game total-goal series
Note: * denotes overtime period(s)

=== 1932 ===
East			West		
Seed	School	Standings	Seed	School	Standings
Missing information

Quarterfinals
St. Francis Xavier	5
Acadia	3

Semifinals
E1	Saint Mary's	1
St. Francis Xavier	4
New Brunswick	1	2
Mount Allison	4	2

Championship
St. Francis Xavier	0
Mount Allison	3

The Eastern semifinal was a single-elimination game while the western semifinal was a 2-game total-goal series
Note: * denotes overtime period(s)

=== 1933 ===
East			West		
Seed	School	Standings	Seed	School	Standings
Missing information

Quarterfinals
St. Francis Xavier	1
Acadia	5

Semifinals
E1	Saint Mary's	4
Acadia	0
New Brunswick	1	0
Mount Allison	2	2

Championship
E1	~~Saint Mary's~~ ^{†}	-
Mount Allison	-

† Saint Mary's administration forbade playing during Lent so Mount Allison won by forfeit.
Note: * denotes overtime period(s)

=== 1934 ===
East			West		
Seed	School	Standings	Seed	School	Standings
1	Dalhousie		1	New Brunswick	2–0–2
^{†}			2	Mount Allison	1–1–2
^{†}			3	St. Joseph's	0–2–2

Quarterfinals
St. Francis Xavier	3
Acadia	4

Semifinals
E1	Dalhousie	2	2	4
Acadia	3	3	6

Championship
W1	New Brunswick	3
Acadia	1

† Nova Scotia Tech withdrew from the league to tour Newfoundland and Labrador. Saint Mary's withdrew because the administration would not permit games during Lent.
‡ Though independent programs at the time, Acadia and St. Francis Xavier were allowed to play in the tournament because of the departure of the other two eastern teams.
Note: * denotes overtime period(s)

=== 1935 ===
East			West		
Seed	School	Standings	Seed	School	Standings
1	Saint Mary's	?	1	Mount Allison	3–0–1
2	Dalhousie	?	2	New Brunswick	1–1–2
3	Nova Scotia Tech	?	3	St. Joseph's	0–3–1

Halifax Final
E1	Saint Mary's	2	2	4
E2	Dalhousie	2	1	3

Quarterfinal
St. Francis Xavier	3	4	7
E1	Saint Mary's	3	2	5

Semifinal
Acadia	2
St. Francis Xavier	5

Championship
W1	Mount Allison	3
St. Francis Xavier	2

Note: * denotes overtime period(s)

=== 1936 ===
East			West		
Seed	School	Standings	Seed	School	Standings
1	Saint Mary's	?	1	New Brunswick	4–0–0
			2	St. Joseph's	1–2–1
			3	Mount Allison	0–3–1

Quarterfinals
St. Francis Xavier	2	9	11
Acadia	3	1	4

Semifinals
E1	Saint Mary's	3
St. Francis Xavier	9

Championship
W1	New Brunswick	2
St. Francis Xavier	3

Note: * denotes overtime period(s)

=== 1937 ===
East			West		
Seed	School	Standings	Seed	School	Standings
1	Dalhousie	1–0 ^{†}	1	Mount Allison	3–0–1
2	Saint Mary's	1–0 ^{†}	2	St. Thomas	1–2–1
3	Nova Scotia Tech	1–1	3	New Brunswick	1–3–0
4	King's	0–2			

† After Dalhousie and Saint Mary's finished in a tie for first, Saint Mary's withdrew from competition. Nova Scotia Tech was then offered a chance to compete for entry into the tournament since they had defeated King's, however, no ice was available on game day and Dalhousie was awarded the title.

Quarterfinals
E1	Dalhousie	7	3	10
Acadia	3	5	8

Semifinals
St. Francis Xavier	5
E1	Dalhousie	3

Championship
W1	Mount Allison	2
St. Francis Xavier	6

Note: * denotes overtime period(s)

=== 1938 ===
East			West		
Seed	School	Standings	Seed	School	Standings
			1	Mount Allison	4–0–0
			T–2	New Brunswick	1–3–0
			T–2	St. Thomas	1–3–0

Semifinals		Championship
		W1	Mount Allison	4
Acadia	5		Acadia	3
St. Francis Xavier	4

Note: * denotes overtime period(s)

=== 1939 ===
East			West		
Seed	School	Standings	Seed	School	Standings
1	Saint Mary's	?	1	Mount Allison	5–1–0
2	Dalhousie	?	2	New Brunswick	4–1–1
3	Nova Scotia Tech	?	3	Saint Dunstan's	3–3–0
			4	St. Thomas	0–6–0

Quarterfinals
St. Francis Xavier	3	1	4
Acadia	3	2	5

Semifinals
E1	Saint Mary’s	3
Acadia	5

Championship
W1	Mount Allison	4
Acadia	0

Note: * denotes overtime period(s)

=== 1940 ===
East			West		
Seed	School	Standings	Seed	School	Standings
?	Saint Mary's	?	1	Saint Dunstan's	4–2–0
?	Dalhousie	?	2	Mount Allison	3–2–1
			3	New Brunswick	2–2–2
			4	St. Thomas	1–4–1

Quarterfinals
Saint Mary’s	4
Dalhousie	1

Semifinals
Acadia	9	11	20
Saint Mary’s	4	5	9

Championship
W1	Saint Dunstan's	0
Acadia	3

Note: * denotes overtime period(s)

=== 1941 ===
East			West		
Seed	School	Standings	Seed	School	Standings
1	Saint Mary's	?	1	New Brunswick	—
2	St. Francis Xavier	2–1		†	
3	Nova Scotia Tech	?			
4	King's	?			

† Due to World War II, New Brunswick was the only active western team this season. Additionally, most associated independent programs joined the conference for this season.

Semifinals					Championship
					W1	New Brunswick	3
E1	Saint Mary’s	7	3	10	E2	St. Francis Xavier	4
E2	St. Francis Xavier	3	8	11

Note: * denotes overtime period(s)

=== 1942 ===
Seed	School	Standings
?	Saint Mary's	?
?	St. Francis Xavier	?
?	Acadia	?

Semifinals				Championship
				Acadia	6	5	11
Saint Mary’s	6	4	10	Saint Mary’s	7	5	12
St. Francis Xavier	5	4	9

Note: * denotes overtime period(s)

=== 1943 ===
Seed	School	Standings
?	Saint Mary's	?
?	St. Francis Xavier	?
?	Acadia	?

Semifinals				Championship
				St. Francis Xavier	3	11	14
Saint Mary’s	8	6	14	Saint Mary’s	3	4	7
Acadia	6	5	11

Note: * denotes overtime period(s)

=== 1944 ===
Seed	School	Standings
?	Saint Mary's	?
?	St. Francis Xavier	?
?	Acadia	?

Semifinals				Championship
				St. Francis Xavier	6
Saint Mary’s	3	5	8	Acadia	3
Acadia	7	3	10

Note: * denotes overtime period(s)

=== 1946 ===
East			West		
Seed	School	Standings	Seed	School	Standings
1	St. Francis Xavier	8–0–0	—	New Brunswick	†
2	Acadia	3–3–1	—	Mount Allison	
3	Dalhousie	1–3–0	—	St. Joseph's	
4	Saint Mary's	0–2–1	—	Saint Dunstan's	
5	Nova Scotia Tech	0–4–0			

† No regular season play occurred for the Western division.

Quarterfinals
New Brunswick	9	3	12
Mount Allison	1	4	5
St. Joseph's	7	6	13
Saint Dunstan's	1	2	3

Semifinals
New Brunswick	0 ^{‡}	4	4
St. Joseph's	0	7	7

Championship
E1	St. Francis Xavier	—
~~St. Joseph's~~	—

‡ The game was stopped after 28 minutes due to a snowstorm.
Note: St. Joseph's was unable to participate and forfeited the championship match.
Note: * denotes overtime period(s)

=== 1947 ===
East			West		
Seed	School	Standings	Seed	School	Standings
1	St. Francis Xavier	7–1–0	—	New Brunswick	†
2	Saint Mary's	4–2–0	—	Mount Allison	
3	Nova Scotia Tech	3–4–0	—	St. Thomas	
4	Acadia	2–6–0	—	Saint Dunstan's	
5	Dalhousie	1–4–0			

† No regular season play occurred for the Western division.

Quarterfinals
Saint Dunstan's	7	11	18
Mount Allison	7	3	10
St. Thomas	7	7	14
New Brunswick	8	4	12

Semifinals
Saint Dunstan's	9	4	13
St. Thomas	4	6	10

Championship
E1	St. Francis Xavier	6
Saint Dunstan's	8

Note: * denotes overtime period(s)

=== 1948 ===
East			West		
Seed	School	Standings	Seed	School	Standings
T–1	Acadia	5–2–0	1	New Brunswick	3–1–0
T–1	St. Francis Xavier	5–2–0	2	Mount Allison	2–2–0
T–3	Dalhousie	2–3–0	3	St. Thomas	1–3–0
T–3	Nova Scotia Tech	2–3–0			
5	Saint Mary's	1–5–0			

Semifinals
Saint Dunstan's	5	5	10
W1	New Brunswick	2	1	3
E1	Acadia	6	†
E2	St. Francis Xavier	5

Championship
Saint Dunstan's	8	5	13
Acadia	14	10	24

† The east semifinal was a single-elimination game
Note: * denotes overtime period(s)

=== 1949 ===
East			West		
Seed	School	Standings	Seed	School	Standings
1	Acadia	3–1–0	—	New Brunswick	†
2	St. Francis Xavier	2–2–0	—	St. Joseph's	
3	Dalhousie	1–3–0	—	St. Thomas	
			—	Saint Dunstan's	

† No regular season play occurred for the Western division.

Quarterfinals
Saint Dunstan's	5	6	11
St. Thomas	8	5	13
New Brunswick	-	-	-
~~St. Joseph's~~	‡

Semifinals
St. Thomas	0	5	5
New Brunswick	5	6	11

Championship
E1	Acadia	7
New Brunswick	6

‡ St. Joseph's was unable to participate and forfeited both games.
Note: * denotes overtime period(s)

=== 1950 ===
East			West		
Seed	School	Standings	Seed	School	Standings
1	St. Francis Xavier	4–0–0	1	New Brunswick	5–0–1
2	Acadia	2–2–0	2	St. Thomas	2–2–2
3	Dalhousie	0–4–0	3	Mount Allison	1–3–0
			4	Saint Dunstan's	1–5–0

Championship
E1	St. Francis Xavier	8	5	13
W1	New Brunswick	2	4	6

Note: * denotes overtime period(s)

=== 1951 ===
East			West		
Seed	School	Standings	Seed	School	Standings
1	St. Francis Xavier	3–0–0	—	New Brunswick	†
2	Acadia	2–2–0	—	Mount Allison	
3	Dalhousie	0–3–0	—	St. Thomas	
			—	Saint Dunstan's	

† No regular season play occurred for the Western division.

Quarterfinals
Saint Dunstan's	4	5	9
St. Thomas	5	11	16
New Brunswick	9	2	11
Mount Allison	1	1	2

Semifinals
St. Thomas	5	8	13
New Brunswick	6	1	7

Championship
E1	St. Francis Xavier	9	5	13
St. Thomas	4	4	8

Note: * denotes overtime period(s)

=== 1952 ===
East			West		
Seed	School	Standings	Seed	School	Standings
1	St. Francis Xavier	†	—	New Brunswick	†
			—	Mount Allison	
			—	St. Thomas	
			—	Saint Dunstan's	

† No regular season play occurred for the Western division and St. Francis Xavier was the only team competing for the eastern title.

Quarterfinals
Saint Dunstan's
~~St. Thomas~~	‡
New Brunswick	2	3	5
Mount Allison	1	2	3

Semifinals
Saint Dunstan's	0	3	3
New Brunswick	6	8	14

Championship
E1	St. Francis Xavier	10	11	21
New Brunswick	1	4	5

‡ St. Thomas dropped out of the tournament before the first game was played.
Note: * denotes overtime period(s)

=== 1953 ===
East			West		
Seed	School	Standings	Seed	School	Standings
—	St. Francis Xavier	†	—	New Brunswick	†
—	Acadia		—	Mount Allison	
			—	St. Thomas	
			—	Saint Dunstan's	

† No regular season play occurred.

Quarterfinals
New Brunswick	1	3	4
St. Thomas	4	3	7
West
Mount Allison	6	7	13
Saint Dunstan's	1	6	7
East

Semifinals
St. Thomas	1	4	5
Mount Allison	7	6	13
St. Francis Xavier	?
Acadia	?

Championship
W	Mount Allison	6	‡	–
E	St. Francis Xavier	2	‡	–

‡ During the second game, the stands at St. Francis Xavier collapsed. The match was cancelled and the schools decided against rescheduling.
No champion was declared
Note: * denotes overtime period(s)

=== 1954 ===
East			West		
Seed	School	Standings	Seed	School	Standings
—	St. Francis Xavier	†	—	New Brunswick	†
—	Acadia		—	Mount Allison	
—	Dalhousie		—	St. Thomas	
			—	Saint Dunstan's	

† No regular season play occurred.

Quarterfinals
East
St. Francis Xavier	?	?	15
Dalhousie	?	?	5
Saint Dunstan's	0	2	2
Mount Allison	9	3	12
West
New Brunswick	8	2*	10
St. Thomas	6	3	9

Semifinals
Acadia	?
St. Francis Xavier	?
Mount Allison	6	9	15
New Brunswick	1	0	1

Championship
E	St. Francis Xavier	3	3	6
W	Mount Allison	3	0	3

Note: * denotes overtime period(s)

=== 1955 ===
East			West		
Seed	School	Standings	Seed	School	Standings
1	St. Francis Xavier	9–3–0	1	Mount Allison	6–0–0
2	Dalhousie	6–6–0	2	St. Thomas	3–2–1
T–3	Acadia	4–7–1	3	Saint Dunstan's	2–4–0
T–3	Saint Mary's	4–7–1	4	New Brunswick	0–5–1

Note: 1955 marks the first season of exclusively collegiate play.

Championship
St. Francis Xavier	7	10	17
Mount Allison	0	1	1

Note: * denotes overtime period(s)

=== 1956 ===
East			West		
Seed	School	Standings	Seed	School	Standings
1	St. Francis Xavier	8–0–0	T–1	Mount Allison	4–2–0
2	Acadia	6–2–0	T–1	Saint Dunstan's	4–2–0
3	Dalhousie	4–4–0	T–1	St. Thomas	4–2–0
4	Saint Mary's	2–6–0	4	New Brunswick	0–6–0
5	Nova Scotia Tech	0–8–0			

Note: Mount Allison won their division due to having the higher number of goals scored.

Quarterfinals
E1	St. Francis Xavier	3	6	9
E3	Dalhousie	1	4	5
E2	Acadia	4	1	5
E4	Saint Mary’s	3	1	4

Semifinals
E1	St. Francis Xavier	7	13	20
E2	Acadia	2	2	4

Championship
W1	Mount Allison	1	1	2
E1	St. Francis Xavier	5	3	8

Note: * denotes overtime period(s)

=== 1957 ===
East			West		
Seed	School	Standings	Seed	School	Standings
T–1	St. Francis Xavier	6–0–2	1	New Brunswick	6–0–0
T–1	Dalhousie	6–0–2	2	Saint Dunstan's	3–2–1
3	Acadia	2–5–1	3	Mount Allison	2–3–1
4	Nova Scotia Tech	2–4–1	4	St. Thomas	0–6–0
5	Saint Mary's	0–7–0			

Note: St. Francis Xavier won their division due to having the higher number of goals scored.

Quarterfinals
E1	St. Francis Xavier	11	6	17
E3	Acadia	0	0	0
E2	Dalhousie	9	4	13
E4	Nova Scotia Tech	6	4	10

Semifinals
E1	St. Francis Xavier	3	2	5
E2	Dalhousie	2	2	4

Championship
W1	New Brunswick	3	3	6
E1	St. Francis Xavier	5	10	15

Note: * denotes overtime period(s)

=== 1958 ===
East			West		
Seed	School	Standings	Seed	School	Standings
1	St. Francis Xavier	8–0–0	T–1	New Brunswick	3–1–0
2	Dalhousie	5–3–0	T–1	Mount Allison	3–1–0
3	Nova Scotia Tech	3–5–0	3	Saint Dunstan's	0–4–0
T–4	Acadia	2–6–0			
T–4	Saint Mary's	2–6–0			

Quarterfinals
E1	St. Francis Xavier	13	9	22
E4	Acadia	1	1	2
East
E2	Dalhousie	7	7	14
E3	Nova Scotia Tech	2	4	6
West

Semifinals
E1	St. Francis Xavier	8	10	18
E2	Dalhousie	3	1	4
W1	New Brunswick	4	4*	8
W2	Mount Allison	2	5	7

Championship
E1	St. Francis Xavier	5	5	10
W1	New Brunswick	5	3	8

Note: * denotes overtime period(s)

=== 1959 ===
East			West		
Seed	School	Standings	Seed	School	Standings
1	Dalhousie	6–1–1	1	St. Thomas	5–0–1
2	Nova Scotia Tech	5–1–2	2	Mount Allison	3–3–0
3	St. Francis Xavier	5–2–1	3	New Brunswick	2–3–1
4	Saint Mary's	2–6–0	4	Saint Dunstan's	1–5–0
5	Acadia	0–8–0			

Quarterfinals
E1	Dalhousie	5	7	12
E4	Saint Mary’s	3	7	10
East
E2	Nova Scotia Tech	0	1	1
E3	St. Francis Xavier	5	4	9
West

Semifinals
E1	Dalhousie	2	2	4
E3	St. Francis Xavier	2	5	7
W1	St. Thomas	8	8	16
W2	Mount Allison	4	1	5

Championship
E3	St. Francis Xavier	3	7	10
W1	St. Thomas	1	0	1

Note: * denotes overtime period(s)

=== 1960 ===
East			West		
Seed	School	Standings	Seed	School	Standings
1	St. Francis Xavier	6–2–0	1	St. Thomas	5–1–0
2	Saint Mary's	4–3–1	2	New Brunswick	4–2–0
3	Dalhousie	4–4–0	3	Mount Allison	2–4–0
4	Acadia	3–5–0	4	Saint Dunstan's	1–5–0
5	Nova Scotia Tech	2–5–1			

Quarterfinals
E1	St. Francis Xavier	11	12	23
E4	Acadia	0	5	5
East
E2	Saint Mary’s	5	3	8
E3	Dalhousie	3	3	6
West

Semifinals
E1	St. Francis Xavier	3	9	12
E2	Saint Mary’s	5	3	8
W1	St. Thomas	1	4	5
W2	New Brunswick	5	6	11

Championship
E1	St. Francis Xavier	~~6~~ ^{†}	0	0
W2	New Brunswick	~~2~~ ^{†}	2	2

† The game was nullified after the fact due to St. Francis Xavier using an ineligible player.
Note: * denotes overtime period(s)

=== 1961 ===
East			West		
Seed	School	Standings	Seed	School	Standings
T–1	St. Francis Xavier	5–3–0	1	Mount Allison	6–0–0
T–1	Dalhousie	5–3–0	T–2	St. Thomas	3–3–0
3	Saint Mary's	4–3–1	T–2	New Brunswick	3–3–0
4	Nova Scotia Tech	3–4–1	4	Saint Dunstan's	0–6–0
5	Acadia	2–6–0			

Quarterfinals
E1	St. Francis Xavier	5	8	13
E4	Nova Scotia Tech	1	4	5
East
E2	Dalhousie	6	3	9
E3	Saint Mary’s	7	4	11
West

Semifinals
E1	St. Francis Xavier	6	7	13
E3	Saint Mary’s	1	2	3
W1	Mount Allison	2	1	3
W2	St. Thomas	2	2	4

Championship
E1	St. Francis Xavier	1	9	10
W2	St. Thomas	6	7	13

Note: * denotes overtime period(s)

=== 1962 ===
East			West		
Seed	School	Standings	Seed	School	Standings
1	St. Francis Xavier	6–0–1	1	New Brunswick	5–1–0
2	Acadia	2–4–1	2	St. Thomas	4–1–1
T–3	Saint Mary's	1–4–2	3	Mount Allison	1–4–1
T–3	Nova Scotia Tech	2–5–0	4	Saint Dunstan's	1–5–0
—	Dalhousie	3–1–0 ^{†}			

† Dalhousie withdrew from competition in December

Quarterfinals
E1	St. Francis Xavier	5	4	9
E4	Nova Scotia Tech	5	3	8
East
E2	Acadia	6	1	7
E3	Saint Mary’s	3	0	3
West

Semifinals
E1	St. Francis Xavier	6	12	18
E2	Acadia	3	2	5
W1	New Brunswick	4	3	7
W2	St. Thomas	2	4	6

Championship
E1	St. Francis Xavier	4	6	2	1
W1	New Brunswick	3	7	4	2

Note: * denotes overtime period(s)
Note: The championship series was a best-of-three

=== 1963 ===
Seed	School	Standings	Seed	School	Standings
1	New Brunswick	9–0–2	6	Acadia	4–5–3
2	St. Francis Xavier	9–2–1	7	Nova Scotia Tech	4–7–1
3	St. Thomas	6–3–2	8	Dalhousie	5–7–0
4	Saint Dunstan's	4–4–3	9	Saint Mary's	0–11–1
5	Mount Allison	3–5–3			

Championship
1	New Brunswick	5	4	4
2	St. Francis Xavier	0	7	5

Note: * denotes overtime period(s)

=== 1964 ===
Seed	School	Standings	Seed	School	Standings
1	New Brunswick	9–2–0	6	Dalhousie	5–6–1
2	Saint Dunstan's	8–3–0	7	Saint Mary's	4–8–0
3	St. Francis Xavier	9–2–1	8	Mount Allison	2–8–1
4	St. Thomas	7–4–0	9	Nova Scotia Tech	1–10–1
5	Acadia	5–7–0			

Note: No playoffs were held due to the lack of time between the end of the regular season and the start of the University Cup Playoffs. Representatives from UNB, Acadia and Dalhousie voted unanimously to award the top overall seed, New Brunswick, the league championship and advanced them to the national tournament.

=== 1965 ===
Seed	School	Standings	Seed	School	Standings
1	Saint Dunstan's	10–1–0	5	Mount Allison	4–6–1
2	St. Francis Xavier	9–2–0	6	Dalhousie	3–10–0
3	New Brunswick	7–3–1	7	Acadia	2–8–1
4	St. Thomas	6–5–0	8	Moncton	1–10–0

Note: No playoffs.

=== 1966 ===
Seed	School	Standings	Seed	School	Standings
1	St. Francis Xavier	14–0–0	5	St. Thomas	5–8–1
2	Saint Dunstan's	10–4–0	6	Acadia	3–10–1
3	New Brunswick	9–4–1	7	Dalhousie	3–11–0
4	Mount Allison	9–5–0	8	Moncton	1–12–1

Note: No playoffs.

=== 1967 ===
Seed	School	Standings	Seed	School	Standings
1	St. Francis Xavier	13–1–0	5	New Brunswick	5–7–1
2	Saint Dunstan's	10–1–1	6	Dalhousie	3–9–2
3	Mount Allison	8–4–1	7	St. Thomas	3–10–0
4	Acadia	7–7–0	8	Moncton	1–11–1

Note: No playoffs.

=== 1968 ===
Seed	School	Standings	Seed	School	Standings
1	St. Francis Xavier	15–1–0	6	Saint Dunstan's	8–8–0
2	Saint Mary's	12–4–0	7	Mount Allison	6–10–0
3	Acadia	10–5–1	8	Moncton	2–14–0
4	New Brunswick	9–7–0	9	Dalhousie	1–15–0
5	St. Thomas	8–7–1			

Semifinals
1	St. Francis Xavier	2
4	New Brunswick	1
2	Saint Mary’s	7
3	Acadia	2

Championship
1	St. Francis Xavier	9
2	Saint Mary’s	6

Note: * denotes overtime period(s)

== Championships ==
School	Championships
St. Francis Xavier	24
Mount Allison	6
New Brunswick	5
Acadia	4
Dalhousie	3
Saint Mary's	2
Saint Dunstan's	2
St. Thomas	1

== See also ==
- AUAA men's ice hockey tournament
- AUS men's ice hockey tournament
