= 1991 CIAU University Cup =

Canadian hockey tournament

Tournament details
- Venue(s): Varsity Arena, Toronto, Ontario
- Dates: March 22–24
- Teams: 4

Final positions
- Champions: Quebec–Trois-Rivières Patriotes (2nd title)
- Runners-up: Alberta Golden Bears

Tournament statistics
- Games played: 3

Awards
- MVP: Denis Desbiens (Quebec–Trois-Rivières)

The 1991 CIAU Men's University Cup Hockey Tournament (29th annual) was held at the Varsity Arena in Toronto, Ontario. The Toronto Varsity Blues served as tournament host.

== Road to the Cup ==
=== AUAA playoffs ===
Quarterfinals
1	Dalhousie	6	3	1
4	St. Francis Xavier	4	4	0
Kelly Division
2	Cape Breton	10	6	—
3	Acadia	5	2	—
1	Prince Edward Island	8	4	—
4	St. Thomas	1	3	—
MacAdam Division
2	Moncton	2	5	1****
3	New Brunswick	6	4	0

Semifinals
1	Dalhousie	4	8	—
2	Cape Breton	1	3	—
1	Prince Edward Island	2	8	8
2	Moncton	6	5	4

Championship
K1	Dalhousie	1	7	0
M1	Prince Edward Island	3	4	3

Note: * denotes overtime period(s)

=== OUAA playoffs ===
First Round
E4	York	4
E5	McGill	5
E3	Toronto	4
E6	Ottawa	3
W4	Western Ontario	2
W5	Guelph	3
W3	Wilfrid Laurier	7
W6	Laurentian	4

Queen's Cup Quarterfinals
E1	Quebec–Trois-Rivières	9	6	—
E5	McGill	3	4	—
East
E2	Concordia	1	6	—
E3	Toronto	2	7	—
W1	Waterloo	1	4	2
W5	Guelph	3	0	0
West
W2	Windsor	2	2	—
W3	Wilfrid Laurier	3	9	—

Queen's Cup Semifinals
E1	Quebec–Trois-Rivières	7	6	—
E3	Toronto	1	2	—
W1	Waterloo	3	8	—
W3	Wilfrid Laurier	1	5	—

Queen's Cup Final
E1	Quebec–Trois-Rivières	5	5	—
W1	Waterloo	2	3	—

Note: * denotes overtime period(s)

=== Canada West playoffs ===
Semifinal
1	Calgary	0	9	1
4	Regina	1	2	5
2	Alberta	5	7	—
3	Saskatchewan	2	5	—

Championship
4	Regina	3	6	3
2	Alberta	4	5	4

Note: * denotes overtime period(s)

== University Cup ==
The bracket matches rotated so that the Atlantic entry played the Quebec entry while the Ontario entry played the Western entry in the semifinals. All rounds were single elimination.

Team	Qualification	Record	Appearance	Last
Alberta Golden Bears	West: Canada West Champion	23–8–2	19th	1989
Prince Edward Island Panthers	Atlantic: AUAA Champion	20–13–1	4th	1988
Quebec–Trois-Rivières Patriotes	Quebec: OUAA Champion	23–4–1	5th	1990
Waterloo Warriors	Ontario: OUAA Runner-up	22–5–2	2nd	1974

=== Bracket ===
Semifinals; March 22–23
A	Prince Edward Island	3
Q	Quebec–Trois-Rivières	4
O	Waterloo	4
W	Alberta	5

Championship; March 24
Q	Quebec–Trois-Rivières	7
W	Alberta	2

Note: * denotes overtime period(s)

== Championship final ==
March 24, 1991	Quebec–Trois-Rivières Patriotes	7–2	Alberta Golden Bears	Varsity Arena, Toronto, Ontario
