= 1994 CIAU University Cup =

Canadian hockey tournament

Tournament details
- Venue(s): Maple Leaf Gardens & Varsity Arena, Toronto, Ontario
- Dates: March 11–13
- Teams: 4

Final positions
- Champions: Lethbridge Pronghorns (1st title)
- Runners-up: Guelph Gryphons

Tournament statistics
- Games played: 3

Awards
- MVP: Trevor Ellerman (Lethbridge)

The 1994 CIAU Men's University Cup Hockey Tournament (32nd annual) was held at the Maple Leaf Gardens and Varsity Arena in Toronto, Ontario. The Toronto Varsity Blues served as tournament host.

== Road to the Cup ==
=== AUAA playoffs ===
Quarterfinals
1	Dalhousie	5	5	—
4	Saint Mary’s	4	1	—
Kelly Division
2	Acadia	7	5	—
3	St. Francis Xavier	3	1	—
1	New Brunswick	3	6	—
4	Prince Edward Island	1	0	—
MacAdam Division
2	St. Thomas	1	2	4
3	Moncton	2	1	5

Semifinals
1	Dalhousie	2	3	—
2	Acadia	12	9	—
1	New Brunswick	4	4*	8
3	Moncton	5	3	4

Championship
K2	Acadia	5	7	—
M1	New Brunswick	3	3	—

Note: * denotes overtime period(s)

=== OUAA playoffs ===
Division Semifinal
FE2	Quebec–Trois-Rivières	6
FE3	Concordia	1
ME2	Queen's	1
ME3	Toronto	4
MW2	York	4
MW3	Laurentian	3
FW2	Wilfrid Laurier	5
FW3	Waterloo	2

Division Final
FE1	Ottawa	2	3	—
FE2	Quebec–Trois-Rivières	5	5	—
East
ME1	Guelph	5	5	—
ME3	Toronto	2	4	—
MW1	Brock	3	3	0
MW2	York	2	4	2
West
FW1	Western Ontario	6	5	—
FW2	Wilfrid Laurier	5	4	—

Queen's Cup Semifinals
FE2	Quebec–Trois-Rivières	2
ME1	Guelph	3
MW2	York	1
FW1	Western Ontario	2

Queen's Cup Final
ME1	Guelph	2
FW1	Western Ontario	1

Note: * denotes overtime period(s)

=== Canada West playoffs ===
Semifinal
1	Lethbridge	4	2	4
4	Regina	5	1	3
2	Calgary	3	5	—
3	Alberta	1	2	—

Championship
1	Lethbridge	2	2	2
2	Calgary	1	3	1

Note: * denotes overtime period(s)

== University Cup ==
The bracket remained unchanged leaving the Atlantic entry played the Western entry while the Ontario entry played the Quebec entry in the semifinals. All rounds were single elimination.

The semifinals were held at the Varsity Arena while the championship took place at the Maple Leaf Gardens.

Team	Qualification	Record	Appearance	Last
Acadia Axemen	Atlantic: AUAA Champion	25–4–3	3rd	1993
Guelph Gryphons	Ontario: OUAA Champion	19–10–1	5th	1993
Lethbridge Pronghorns	West: Canada West Champion	23–9–2	1st	Never
Western Ontario Mustangs	Quebec: OUAA Runner-up	25–2–1	3rd	1988

=== Bracket ===
Semifinals; March 11
A	Acadia	6
W	Lethbridge	9
O	Guelph	6
Q	Western Ontario	5

Championship; March 13
W	Lethbridge	5
O	Guelph	2

Note: * denotes overtime period(s)

== Championship final ==
March 13, 1994	Lethbridge Pronghorns	5–2	Guelph Gryphons	Maple Leaf Gardens, Toronto, Ontario
