= Acadia Axemen ice hockey =

- University: Acadia University
- Conference: AUS
- Head coach: Darren Burns; Since 2001–02 season
- Arena: Andrew H. McCain Arena; Wolfville, Nova Scotia
- Colors: Red and Blue
- Fight song: "Stand Up and Cheer"

U Sports tournament champions
- 1993, 1996

U Sports tournament appearances
- 1992, 1993, 1994, 1996, 1998, 2006, 2014, 2015, 2017, 2018, 2020, 2022

Conference tournament champions
- 1920, 1940, 1948, 1949, 1992, 1993, 1994, 1996, 2006, 2014

The Acadia Axemen ice hockey team is an ice hockey team representing the Acadia Axemen athletics program of Acadia University. The team is a member of the Atlantic University Sport conference and compete in U Sports. The team plays their home games at the Andrew H. McCain Arena (formerly the "Acadia Arena") in Wolfville, Nova Scotia.

== History ==
Acadia has fielded an ice hockey team since 1905. Up until 1954, the school played both college and senior hockey, stopping for only war years during World War I and World War II. Beginning in 1954–55, the Axemen played exclusively at the collegiate level and has seen some success over the years. Their pinnacle was during the 1990s when Acadia won two national championships.

== Season-by-season results ==
=== Senior and collegiate play ===
Note: GP = Games played, W = Wins, L = Losses, T = Ties, Pts = Points

U Sports Champion	U Sports Semifinalist	Conference regular season champions	Conference Division Champions	Conference Playoff Champions

Season	Conference	Regular Season											Conference Tournament Results	National Tournament Results
Season	Conference	Conference						Overall					Conference Tournament Results	National Tournament Results
Season	Conference	GP	W	L	T	Pts*	Finish	GP	W	L	T	%	Conference Tournament Results	National Tournament Results
Senior Hockey
1905–06	Independent	–	–	–	–	–	–	?	?	?	?	?		
1906–07	Independent	–	–	–	–	–	–	?	?	?	?	?		
1907–08	Independent	–	–	–	–	–	–	?	?	?	?	?		
1908–09	Independent	–	–	–	–	–	–	?	?	?	?	?		
1909–10	Independent	–	–	–	–	–	–	?	?	?	?	?		
1910–11	Independent	–	–	–	–	–	–	?	?	?	?	?		
1911–12	Independent	–	–	–	–	–	–	?	?	?	?	?		
1912–13	Independent	–	–	–	–	–	–	?	?	?	?	?		
1913–14	Independent	–	–	–	–	–	–	?	?	?	?	?		
1914–15	Independent	–	–	–	–	–	–	?	?	?	?	?		
Program suspended due to World War I
Senior and Intercollegiate Hockey
1919–20	MIAA	?	?	?	?	?	1st	?	?	?	?	?	Won Championship, 8–3 (St. Francis Xavier)	
1920–21	MIAA	2	1	1	0	2	2nd	?	?	?	?	?		
1921–22	MIAA	?	?	?	?	?	?	?	?	?	?	?		
1922–23	MIAA	2	1	1	0	2	T–2nd	?	?	?	?	?		
1923–24	MIAA	2	2	0	0	4	2nd	?	?	?	?	?	Lost Championship, 2–6 (St. Francis Xavier)	
1924–25	MIAA	2	0	2	0	0	?	?	?	?	?	?		
1925–26	MIAA	2	1	1	0	2	?	?	?	?	?	?	Lost Semifinal, 2–5 (New Brunswick)	
1926–27	Independent	?	?	?	?	?	?	?	?	?	?	?		
1927–28	Independent	?	?	?	?	?	?	?	?	?	?	?		
1928–29	Independent	?	?	?	?	?	?	?	?	?	?	?		
1929–30	Independent	?	?	?	?	?	?	?	?	?	?	?	Lost MIAA Quarterfinal, 2–3 (St. Francis Xavier)	
1930–31	Independent	?	?	?	?	?	?	?	?	?	?	?	Lost MIAA Quarterfinal, 1–5 (St. Francis Xavier)	
1931–32	Independent	?	?	?	?	?	?	?	?	?	?	?	Lost MIAA Quarterfinal, 3–5 (St. Francis Xavier)	
1932–33	Independent	?	?	?	?	?	?	?	?	?	?	?	Won MIAA Quarterfinal, 5–1 (St. Francis Xavier); Lost MIAA Semifinal, 0–4 (Saint Mary's)	
1933–34	Independent	?	?	?	?	?	?	?	?	?	?	?	Won MIAA Quarterfinal, 4–3 (St. Francis Xavier); Won MIAA Semifinal series, 6–4 (Dalhousie); Lost MIAA Championship, 1–3 (New Brunswick)	
1934–35	Independent	?	?	?	?	?	?	?	?	?	?	?	Lost MIAA Semifinal, 2–5 (St. Francis Xavier)	
1935–36	Independent	?	?	?	?	?	?	?	?	?	?	?	Lost MIAA Quarterfinal series, 4–11 (St. Francis Xavier)	
1936–37	Independent	?	?	?	?	?	?	?	?	?	?	?	Lost MIAA Quarterfinal series, 8–10 (Dalhousie)	
1937–38	Independent	?	?	?	?	?	?	?	?	?	?	?	Won MIAA Semifinal, 5–4 (St. Francis Xavier); Lost MIAA Championship, 3–4 (Mount Allison)	
1938–39	Independent	?	?	?	?	?	?	?	?	?	?	?	Won MIAA Quarterfinal series, 5–4 (St. Francis Xavier); Won MIAA Semifinal, 5–3 (Saint Mary's); Lost MIAA Championship, 0–4 (Mount Allison)	
1939–40	Independent	?	?	?	?	?	?	?	?	?	?	?	Won MIAA Semifinal series, 20–9 (Saint Mary's); Won MIAA Championship, 3–0 (Saint Dunstan's)	
1940–41	Independent	?	?	?	?	?	?	?	?	?	?	?		
1941–42	MIAA	?	?	?	?	?	?	?	?	?	?	?	Lost Championship series, 11–12 (Saint Mary's)	
1942–43	MIAA	?	?	?	?	?	?	?	?	?	?	?	Lost Semifinal series, 11–14 (Saint Mary's)	
1943–44	MIAA	?	?	?	?	?	?	?	?	?	?	?	Won Semifinal series, 10–8 (Saint Mary's); Lost Championship, 3–6 (St. Francis Xavier)	
Program suspended due to World War II
1945–46	MIAA	7	3	3	1	.500	2nd	?	?	?	?	?		
1946–47	MIAA	8	2	6	0	.250	4th	?	?	?	?	?		
1947–48	MIAA	7	5	2	0	.714	T–2nd	?	?	?	?	?	Won Semifinal, 6–5 (St. Francis Xavier); Won Championship series, 24–13 (Saint Dunstan's)	
1948–49	MIAA	4	3	1	0	.750	1st	?	?	?	?	?	Won Championship, 7–6 (New Brunswick)	
1949–50	MIAA	4	2	2	0	.500	T–3rd	?	?	?	?	?		
1950–51	MIAA	4	2	2	0	.500	2nd	?	?	?	?	?		
1951–52	Independent	–	–	–	–	–	–	?	?	?	?	?		
1952–53	MIAA	0	0	0	0	0	–	?	?	?	?	?	Lost Semifinal series, ? (St. Francis Xavier)	
1953–54	MIAA	0	0	0	0	0	–	?	?	?	?	?	Lost Semifinal series, ? (St. Francis Xavier)	
Totals								GP	W	L	T	%	Championships	
Regular Season								?	?	?	?	?	3 MIAA Division Championships, 2 MIAA Championships	
Conference Post-season								?	?	?	?	?	4 MIAA Championships	
Regular Season and Postseason Record								?	?	?	?	?		

=== Collegiate only ===
Note: GP = Games played, W = Wins, L = Losses, T = Ties, OTL = Overtime Losses, SOL = Shootout Losses, Pts = Points

U Sports Champion	U Sports Semifinalist	Conference regular season champions	Conference Division Champions	Conference Playoff Champions

Season	Conference	Regular Season													Conference Tournament Results	National Tournament Results
Season	Conference	Conference								Overall					Conference Tournament Results	National Tournament Results
Season	Conference	GP	W	L	T	OTL	SOL	Pts*	Finish	GP	W	L	T	%	Conference Tournament Results	National Tournament Results
1954–55	MIAA	12	4	7	1	–	–	9	T–5th	12	4	7	1	.375		
1955–56	MIAA	8	6	2	0	–	–	12	2nd	10	6	4	0	.600	Lost Quarterfinal series, 5–9 (St. Francis Xavier)	
1956–57	MIAA	8	2	5	1	–	–	5	7th	10	2	7	1	.250	Lost Quarterfinal series, 0–17 (St. Francis Xavier)	
1957–58	MIAA	8	2	6	0	–	–	4	T–6th	10	2	8	0	.200	Lost Quarterfinal series, 2–22 (St. Francis Xavier)	
1958–59	MIAA	8	0	8	0	–	–	0	9th	8	0	8	0	.000		
1959–60	MIAA	8	3	5	0	–	–	6	6th	10	3	7	0	.300	Lost Quarterfinal series, 5–23 (St. Francis Xavier)	
1960–61	MIAA	8	2	6	0	–	–	4	8th	8	2	6	0	.250		
1961–62	MIAA	7	2	4	1	–	–	5	3rd	11	4	6	1	.409	Won Quarterfinal series, 7–3 (Saint Mary's); Lost Semifinal series, 5–18 (St. Francis Xavier)	
1962–63	MIAA	12	4	5	3	–	–	13	6th	12	4	5	3	.458		
1963–64	MIAA	12	5	7	0	–	–	19	5th	12	5	7	0	.417		
1964–65	MIAA	11	4	7	0	–	–	7	7th	11	4	7	0	.364		
1965–66	MIAA	14	3	10	1	–	–	7	6th	14	3	10	1	.250		
1966–67	MIAA	14	7	7	0	–	–	14	4th	14	7	7	0	.500		
1967–68	MIAA	16	10	5	1	–	–	21	3rd	17	10	6	1	.618	Lost Semifinal, 2–7 (Saint Mary's)	
1968–69	AIAA	17	11	5	1	–	–	23	T–3rd	18	11	6	1	.639	Lost Semifinal, 4–6 (Saint Mary's)	
1969–70	AIAA	18	9	9	0	–	–	18	7th	18	9	9	0	.500		
1970–71	AIAA	18	8	10	0	–	–	16	5th	18	8	10	0	.444		
1971–72	AIAA	18	9	9	0	–	–	18	5th	18	9	9	0	.500		
1972–73	AIAA	20	13	7	0	–	–	.650	3rd	21	13	8	0	.619	Lost Semifinal, 2–9 (Moncton)	
1973–74	AUAA	21	3	17	1	–	–	.167	9th	21	3	17	1	.167		
1974–75	AUAA	18	12	6	0	–	–	24	T–3rd	19	12	7	0	.632	Won Semifinal, 7–3 (Moncton); Lost Championship, 2–9 (Saint Mary's)	
1975–76	AUAA	16	3	13	0	–	–	6	8th	16	3	13	0	.188		
1976–77	AUAA	20	6	14	0	–	–	12	7th	20	6	14	0	.300		
1977–78	AUAA	20	2	16	2	–	–	6	8th	20	2	16	2	.150		
1978–79	AUAA	20	8	11	1	–	–	17	6th	20	8	11	1	.425		
1979–80	AUAA	29	10	18	1	–	–	21	8th	29	10	18	1	.362		
1980–81	AUAA	24	10	14	0	–	–	20	7th	24	10	14	0	.417		
1981–82	AUAA	26	12	13	1	–	–	25	7th	26	12	13	1	.481		
1982–83	AUAA	24	8	14	2	–	–	18	7th	24	8	14	2	.375		
1983–84	AUAA	24	15	9	0	–	–	30	4th	27	16	11	0	.593	Lost Semifinal series, 1–2 (New Brunswick)	
1984–85	AUAA	24	14	8	2	–	–	30	3rd	27	15	10	2	.593	Lost Semifinal series, 1–2 (Moncton)	
1985–86	AUAA	25	10	15	0	–	–	.400	6th	25	10	15	0	.400		
1986–87	AUAA	25	11	14	0	–	–	.440	5th	25	11	14	0	.440		
1987–88	AUAA	26	18	6	2	–	–	38	T–2nd	29	19	8	2	.690	Lost Semifinal series, 1–2 (Prince Edward Island)	
1988–89	AUAA	26	17	8	1	–	–	35	T–2nd	32	20	11	1	.641	Won Quarterfinal series, 2–1 (Cape Breton); Lost Semifinal series, 1–2 (St. Thomas)	
1989–90	AUAA	21	16	5	0	–	–	32	T–1st	26	18	8	0	.692	Won Quarterfinal series, 2–1 (Cape Breton); Lost Semifinal series, 0–2 (Prince Edward Island)	
1990–91	AUAA	26	12	12	2	–	–	26	6th	28	12	14	2	.464	Lost Division Semifinal series, 0–2 (Cape Breton)	
1991–92	AUAA	24	18	4	2	–	–	38	1st	33	25	6	2	.788	Won Quarterfinal series, 2–0 (St. Francis Xavier); Won Semifinal series, 2–1 (Dalhousie); Won Championship series, 2–0 (Prince Edward Island)	Won Semifinal, 5–2 (Wilfrid Laurier); Lost Championship, 2–5 (Alberta)
1992–93	AUAA	26	22	2	2	–	–	46	1st	35	30	3	2	.886	Won Quarterfinal series, 2–1 (Cape Breton); Won Semifinal series, 2–0 (Dalhousie); Won Championship series, 2–0 (New Brunswick)	Won Semifinal, 9–4 (Alberta); Won Championship, 12–1 (Toronto)
1993–94	AUAA	26	19	4	3	–	–	41	2nd	33	25	5	3	.803	Won Quarterfinal series, 2–0 (St. Francis Xavier); Won Semifinal series, 2–0 (Dalhousie); Won Championship series, 2–0 (New Brunswick)	Lost Semifinal, 6–9 (Lethbridge)
1994–95	AUAA	26	22	1	3	–	–	47	1st	31	21	9	1	.694	Won Quarterfinal series, 2–0 (St. Francis Xavier); Won Semifinal series, 2–0 (Dalhousie); Lost Championship series, 0–2 (Moncton)	
1995–96	AUAA	26	19	6	1	–	–	39	T–1st	37	27	9	1	.743	Won Quarterfinal series, 2–1 (Saint Mary's); Won Semifinal series, 2–1 (Dalhousie); Won Championship series, 2–1 (Prince Edward Island)	Won Semifinal, 4–3 (Quebec–Trois-Rivières); Won Championship, 3–2 (Waterloo)
1996–97	AUAA	28	21	6	1	–	–	43	1st	34	25	8	1	.750	Won Quarterfinal series, 2–0 (Saint Mary's); Won Semifinal series, 2–0 (Dalhousie); Lost Championship series, 0–2 (New Brunswick)	
1997–98	AUAA	28	17	10	1	0	–	35	3rd	38	24	13	1	.645	Won Quarterfinal series, 2–0 (Dalhousie); Won Semifinal series, 2–0 (St. Francis Xavier); Lost Championship series, 1–2 (New Brunswick)	Won Pool B Round-Robin, 6–5 (Saskatchewan), 7–4 (Quebec–Trois-Rivières); Lost Championship, 3–6 (New Brunswick)
1998–99	AUS	26	14	10	2	0	–	30	T–2nd	34	19	13	2	.588	Won Quarterfinal series, 2–0 (Saint Mary's); Won Semifinal series, 2–1 (St. Francis Xavier); Lost Championship series, 1–2 (Moncton)	
1999–00	AUS	26	13	13	0	2	–	28	6th	35	18	17	0	.514	Won Quarterfinal series, 2–0 (St. Francis Xavier); Won Semifinal series, 2–1 (Saint Mary's); Lost Championship series, 1–3 (New Brunswick)	
2000–01	AUS	28	11	13	4	1	–	27	5th	31	12	15	4	.452	Lost Quarterfinal series, 1–2 (New Brunswick)	
2001–02	AUS	28	9	12	3	4	–	25	7th	28	9	16	3	.375		
2002–03	AUS	28	10	17	1	0	–	21	7th	28	10	17	1	.375		
2003–04	AUS	28	11	15	1	1	–	24	7th	28	11	16	1	.411		
2004–05	AUS	28	14	8	6	0	–	34	T–1st	35	18	11	6	.600	Won Semifinal series, 2–0 (New Brunswick); Lost Championship series, 2–3 (Moncton)	
2005–06	AUS	28	19	7	1	1	–	40	1st	35	24	10	1	.700	Won Semifinal series, 2–0 (Saint Mary's); Won Championship series, 3–0 (New Brunswick)	Lost Pool B Round-Robin, 1–5 (Saskatchewan), 3–4 (Lakehead)
2006–07	AUS	28	11	14	–	3	–	25	6th	30	11	19	0	.367	Lost Quarterfinal series, 0–2 (St. Francis Xavier)	
2007–08	AUS	28	11	14	–	3	–	25	6th	30	11	19	0	.367	Lost Quarterfinal series, 0–2 (Moncton)	
2008–09	AUS	28	15	12	–	1	–	31	5th	33	17	16	0	.515	Won Quarterfinal series, 2–0 (St. Francis Xavier); Lost Semifinal series, 0–3 (New Brunswick)	
2009–10	AUS	28	19	6	–	3	–	41	2nd	32	20	12	0	.625	Lost Semifinal series, 1–3 (Saint Mary's)	
2010–11	AUS	28	14	11	–	3	–	31	4th	34	17	17	0	.500	Won Quarterfinal series, 2–0 (Prince Edward Island); Lost Semifinal series, 1–3 (New Brunswick)	
2011–12	AUS	28	16	10	–	2	–	34	5th	31	17	14	0	.548	Lost Quarterfinal series, 1–2 (Prince Edward Island)	
2012–13	AUS	28	17	9	–	2	0	36	3rd	35	20	15	0	.571	Won Quarterfinal series, 2–1 (Moncton); Lost Semifinal series, 1–3 (Saint Mary's)	
2013–14	AUS	28	21	4	–	2	1	45	2nd	38	27	10	1	.724	Won Semifinal series, 3–1 (Moncton); Won Championship series, 3–1 (Saint Mary's)	Lost Pool B Round-Robin, 2–4 (Windsor), 2–3 (Saskatchewan)
2014–15	AUS	28	20	5	–	3	0	43	2nd	36	23	13	0	.639	Won Semifinal series, 3–2 (Saint Mary's); Lost Championship series, 0–2 (New Brunswick)	Lost Quarterfinal, 5–6 (OT) (Quebec–Trois-Rivières)
2015–16	AUS	28	19	7	–	1	1	40	T–2nd	30	19	10	1	.650	Lost Quarterfinal series, 0–2 (Prince Edward Island)	
2016–17	AUS	30	20	8	–	2	0	42	2nd	35	22	13	0	.629	Lost Semifinal series, 0–3 (St. Francis Xavier); Won Third Place series, 2–0 (Saint Mary's)	Won Quarterfinal, 4–1 (Alberta); Lost Semifinal, 0–3 (New Brunswick); Won Consolation Game, 7–3 (St. Francis Xavier)
2017–18	AUS	30	18	10	–	1	1	38	3rd	41	24	16	1	.598	Won Quarterfinal series, 2–0 (Dalhousie); Lost Semifinal series, 2–3 (St. Francis Xavier); Won Third Place series, 2–1 (Saint Mary's)	Lost Quarterfinal, 6–8 (Alberta)
2018–19	AUS	30	10	17	–	2	1	23	6th	33	11	21	1	.348	Lost Quarterfinal series, 1–2 (St. Francis Xavier)	
2019–20	AUS	30	19	9	–	0	2	40	2nd	37	23	12	2	.649	Won Semifinal series, 3–1 (Saint Mary's); Lost Championship series, 1–2 (New Brunswick)	Quarterfinal, vs. (Ottawa) cancelled due to COVID-19 pandemic
2020–21	Season cancelled due to COVID-19 pandemic															
2021–22	AUS	22	7	14	–	0	1	15	6th	25	7	17	1	.300	Lost Play-In, 2–3 (OT) (Moncton)	Lost Quarterfinal, 0–7 (Alberta)
2022–23	AUS	30	11	16	–	2	1	25	5th	36	14	21	1	.403	Won Quarterfinal series, 2–0 (St. Francis Xavier); Lost Semifinal series, 1–3 (Saint Mary's)	
2023–24	AUS	30	9	16	–	2	3	23	6th	32	9	20	3	.328	Lost Quarterfinal series, 0–2 (St. Francis Xavier)	
Totals										GP	W	L	T/SOL	%	Championships	
Regular Season										1538	787	685	66	.533	9 Kelly Division Titles, 6 AUAA Championships, 2 AUS Championships	
Conference Post-season										196	100	96	0	.510	4 AUAA Championships, 2 AUS Championships	
U Sports Postseason										20	9	11	0	.474	12 National tournament appearances	
Regular Season and Postseason Record										1754	896	792	66	.530	2 National Championships	

Note: Totals include results from 1954–55 onward.

== Notable alumni ==
While no alumnus has yet reached the NHL, several Axemen have gone on to play professionally at high levels.

- Brian Casey (1995–96)
- Andrew Clark (2009–13)
- Duane Dennis (1990–94)
- Kirk Furey (1998–01)
- Stephen Harper (2016–20)
- Jeff MacLeod (1993–95)
