= Memorial Sea-Hawks men's ice hockey =

- University: Memorial University of Newfoundland
- First season: 1969 (disestablished 1982)
- Colors: Claret and White

The Memorial Sea-Hawks men's ice hockey team (formerly the Memorial Beothuks) was an ice hockey team representing the Memorial Sea-Hawks athletics program of Memorial University of Newfoundland.

== History ==
The origins of Memorial's ice hockey team are uncertain but the team began play as a senior team. This was mainly due to the lack of nearby collegiate opponents as the nearest schools that fielded teams were hundreds of miles away and could not be reached by roads alone. Memorial instead competed for the Boyle Trophy, the senior championship of St. John's. In the 60s, the Beothuks finally climbed to the top of the heap, winning three titles in four years. The suddenly overpowering club decided to take a gamble and join the Atlantic Intercollegiate Athletic Association in 1968. The transition could not have gone much worse as Memorial proved to be one of the conference's low-lights. The Beothuks made one postseason appearance in eight years and were one of the worst teams in the conference. Memorial withdrew from the since renamed AUAA in 1976, returning to play local senior hockey.

In 1979, Memorial tried their hand at college hockey a second tine, rejoining the AUAA. The results weren't any better. The Beothuks finished last in the standings in back-to-back years and, although they showed minor improvement in 1982, still finished ninth out of ten teams. Afterwards, the school decided that the program was too expensive to continue supporting. Rather than field a senior team themselves, the athletic department reasoned that students who wanted to play ice hockey could join one of the local outfits. Occasional efforts have been made to restart the program but they have met with little success.

== Season-by-season results ==
=== Collegiate only ===
Note: GP = Games played, W = Wins, L = Losses, T = Ties, OTL = Overtime Losses, SOL = Shootout Losses, Pts = Points

U Sports Champion	U Sports Semifinalist	Conference regular season champions	Conference Division Champions	Conference Playoff Champions

Season	Conference	Regular Season													Conference Tournament Results	National Tournament Results
Season	Conference	Conference								Overall					Conference Tournament Results	National Tournament Results
Season	Conference	GP	W	L	T	OTL	SOL	Pts*	Finish	GP	W	L	T	%	Conference Tournament Results	National Tournament Results
1968–69	AIAA	18	4	13	1	–	–	9	9th	18	4	13	1	.250		
1969–70	AIAA	18	2	16	0	–	–	4	9th	18	2	16	0	.111		
1970–71	AIAA	18	2	16	0	–	–	4	10th	18	2	16	0	.111		
1971–72	AIAA	18	10	8	0	–	–	20	T–3rd	19	10	9	0	.526	Lost Semifinal, 2–4 (Saint Mary's)	
1972–73	AIAA	16	2	14	0	–	–	.125	9th	16	2	14	0	.125		
1973–74	AUAA	16	7	7	2	–	–	.500	7th	16	7	7	2	.500		
1974–75	AUAA	18	5	13	0	–	–	10	8th	18	5	13	0	.278		
1975–76	AUAA	16	1	15	0	–	–	2	10th	16	1	15	0	.063		
Withdrew from college hockey
1979–80	AUAA	19	1	17	1	–	–	3	10th	19	1	17	1	.079		
1980–81	AUAA	16	2	14	0	–	–	4	10th	16	2	14	0	.125		
1981–82	AUAA	26	5	20	1	–	–	11	9th	26	5	20	1	.212		
Program suspended
Totals										GP	W	L	T/SOL	%	Championships	
Regular Season										199	41	153	5	.219		
Conference Post-season										1	0	1	0	.000		
U Sports Postseason										0	0	0	0	–		
Regular Season and Postseason Record										200	41	154	5	.218		

Note: Totals include only results at collegiate level of play.
