= Moncton Aigles Bleus ice hockey =

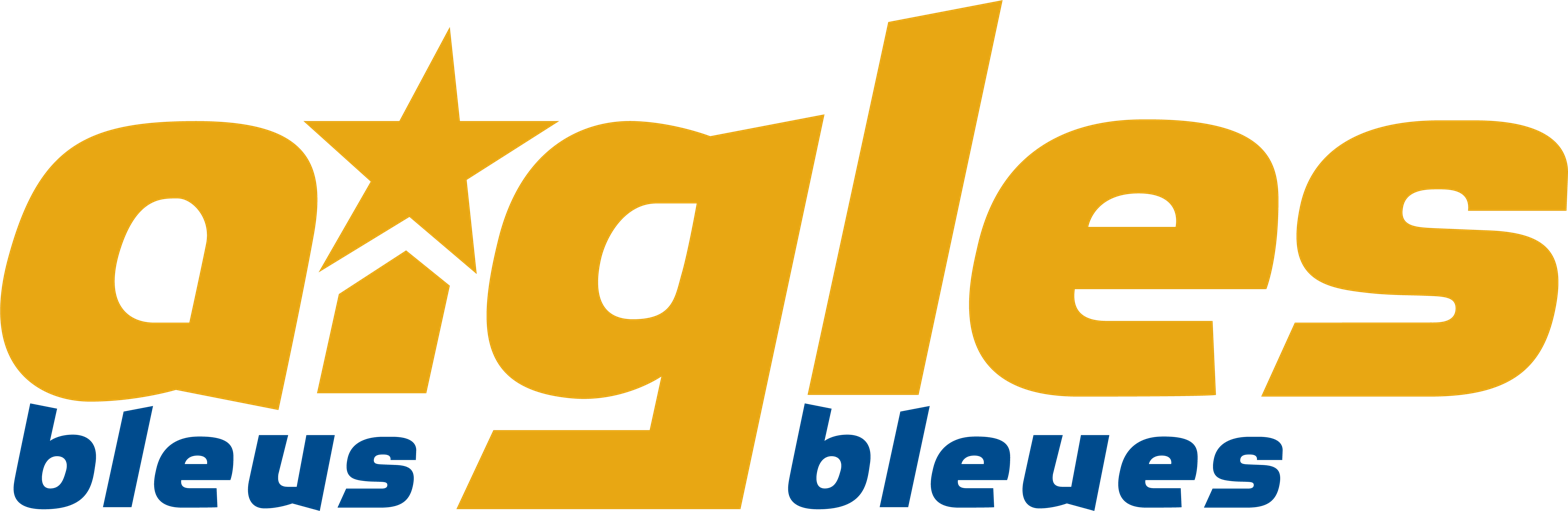
- University: Université de Moncton
- Conference: AUS
- First season: 1964–65
- Head coach: Derek Cormier; 2nd season
- Assistant coaches: Ricky Jacob; Adrien Lemay
- Arena: Jean-Louis Lévesque Arena; Moncton, New Brunswick
- Colors: Bleu et Or (Blue and Gold)

U Sports tournament champions
- 1981, 1982, 1990, 1995

U Sports tournament appearances
- 1976, 1978, 1980, 1981, 1982, 1983, 1986, 1989, 1990, 1995, 1999, 2005, 2007, 2008, 2012, 2024, 2025

Conference tournament champions
- 1980, 1981, 1982, 1983, 1986, 1989, 1990, 1995, 1999, 2005, 2007

The Moncton Aigles Bleus ice hockey team is an ice hockey team representing the Moncton Aigles Bleus athletics program of Université de Moncton. The team is a member of the Atlantic University Sport conference and compete in U Sports. The team plays their home games at the J. Louis Levesque Arena in Moncton, New Brunswick.

== History ==
Just 2 years after the founding of the Université de Moncton, the school began sponsoring men's ice hockey as a varsity sport. The Aigles Bleus (Blue Eagles) had a difficult time getting off the ground, remaining at or near the bottom of the standings for their first 8 seasons. 1973 saw not only the program's first winning season but also its first playoff appearance. The team steadily built itself into a power over the remainder of the decade and won four consecutive league championships in the early 1980s. During that stretch, the Aigles won back-to-back national championships, the second of which came in front of their home fans. For the rest of the 20th century, Moncton was one of the top colleges in the Maritimes, winning five more AUAA titles and 2 more national crowns.

Since the start of the 21st century, Moncton has come back to earth. Since they won two league titles in the mid 00s, the team had been a middling program and has produced more losing seasons than winning ones.

=== St. Joseph's ===
The University of Moncton was formed by the amalgamation of three colleges in 1963. One of those three schools, the University of St. Joseph's College, had previous fielded a varsity ice hockey team. The records for St. Joseph's are incomplete and muddled as the program also competed as a senior team during their existence.

== Season-by-season results ==
=== St. Joseph's ===
Note: GP = Games played, W = Wins, L = Losses, T = Ties, Pts = Points

U Sports Champion	U Sports Semifinalist	Conference regular season champions	Conference Division Champions	Conference Playoff Champions

Season	Conference	Regular Season											Conference Tournament Results	National Tournament Results
Season	Conference	Conference						Overall					Conference Tournament Results	National Tournament Results
Season	Conference	GP	W	L	T	Pts*	Finish	GP	W	L	T	%	Conference Tournament Results	National Tournament Results
1933–34	MIAA	4	0	2	2	2	3rd							
1934–35	MIAA	4	0	3	1	1	3rd							
1935–36	MIAA	4	1	2	1	3	2nd							
1945–46	MIAA	0	0	0	0	0	—						Won MIAA Quarterfinal series, 13–3 (Saint Dunstan's); Won MIAA Semifinal series, 7–4 (New Brunswick); Forfeited Championship Game, no contest (St. Francis Xavier)	
1948–49	MIAA	0	0	0	0	0	—						Forfeited MIAA Quarterfinal series, no contest (New Brunswick)	

=== Moncton ===
Note: GP = Games played, W = Wins, L = Losses, T = Ties, OTL = Overtime Losses, SOL = Shootout Losses, Pts = Points

U Sports Champion	U Sports Semifinalist	Conference regular season champions	Conference Division Champions	Conference Playoff Champions

Season	Conference	Regular Season													Conference Tournament Results	National Tournament Results
Season	Conference	Conference								Overall					Conference Tournament Results	National Tournament Results
Season	Conference	GP	W	L	T	OTL	SOL	Pts*	Finish	GP	W	L	T	%	Conference Tournament Results	National Tournament Results
1964–65	MIAA	11	1	10	0	–	–	4	8th	11	1	10	0	.091		
1965–66	MIAA	14	1	12	1	–	–	3	8th	14	1	12	1	.107		
1966–67	MIAA	13	1	11	1	–	–	3	8th	13	1	11	1	.115		
1967–68	MIAA	16	2	14	0	–	–	4	8th	16	2	14	0	.125		
1968–69	AIAA	17	5	12	0	–	–	10	T–7th	17	5	12	0	.294		
1969–70	AIAA	18	6	12	0	–	–	12	8th	18	6	12	0	.333		
1970–71	AIAA	18	7	11	0	–	–	14	6th	18	7	11	0	.389		
1971–72	AIAA	18	7	10	1	–	–	15	6th	18	7	10	1	.417		
1972–73	AIAA	20	14	6	0	–	–	.700	2nd	22	15	7	0	.682	Won Semifinal, 9–2 (Acadia); Lost Championship, 1–6 (Saint Mary's)	
1973–74	AUAA	20	14	5	1	–	–	29	2nd	21	6	11	4	.381	Won Semifinal, 5–1 (St. Francis Xavier); Lost Championship, 2–12 (Saint Mary's)	
1974–75	AUAA	18	14	4	0	–	–	28	2nd	19	14	5	0	.737	Lost Semifinal, 3–7 (Acadia)	
1975–76	AUAA	16	10	5	1	–	–	21	4th	16	6	9	1	.406	Won Semifinal, 9–5 (Saint Mary's); Lost Championship, 5–7 (St. Francis Xavier)	Lost Eastern semifinal, 0–5 (Concordia)
1976–77	AUAA	20	13	6	1	–	–	27	3rd	22	13	8	1	.614	Lost Semifinal series, 0–2 (Saint Mary's)	
1977–78	AUAA	20	11	9	0	–	–	22	4th	24	11	13	0	.458	Lost Semifinal series, 0–2 (Saint Mary's)	Lost Group 2 Round-robin, 3–7 (Toronto), 3–7 (Concordia)
1978–79	AUAA	20	10	8	2	–	–	22	3rd	22	10	10	2	.500	Lost Semifinal series, 0–2 (Dalhousie)	
1979–80	AUAA	27	22	4	1	–	–	45	1st	34	27	6	1	.809	Won Semifinal series, 2–1 (Saint Mary's); Won Championship series, 2–0 (Dalhousie)	Lost Group 2 Round-Robin, 4–7 (Regina), 6–5 (Guelph)
1980–81	AUAA	24	18	5	1	–	–	37	1st	30	24	5	1	.817	Won Semifinal series, 8–5 (New Brunswick); Won Championship series, 2–0 (Dalhousie)	Won Group 1 Round-Robin, 5–2 (Calgary), 10–3 (Brandon); Won Championship, 4–2 (Saskatchewan)
1981–82	AUAA	26	17	8	1	–	–	35	T–2nd	33	24	8	1	.742	Won Semifinal Group 2 Round-Robin, 4–1 (Saint Mary's), 7–3 (Mount Allison); Won Championship series, 2–0 (Prince Edward Island)	Won Group 2 Round-Robin, 3–1 (Brandon), 8–3 (Toronto); Won Championship, 3–2 (Saskatchewan)
1982–83	AUAA	24	20	3	1	–	–	41	1st	31	24	5	2	.806	Won Semifinal series, 2–0 (Saint Mary's); Won Championship series, 2–1 (Dalhousie)	Lost Group 1 Round-Robin, 4–6 (Toronto), 4–4 (Concordia)
1983–84	AUAA	24	19	5	0	–	–	38	2nd	28	21	7	0	.750	Won Semifinal series, 2–0 (Prince Edward Island); Lost Championship series, 0–2 (New Brunswick)	
1984–85	AUAA	24	19	4	1	–	–	39	2nd	29	21	7	1	.741	Won Semifinal series, 2–1 (Acadia); Lost Championship series, 0–2 (Prince Edward Island)	
1985–86	AUAA	24	20	4	0	–	–	40	1st	32	26	6	0	.813	Won Semifinal series, 2–0 (St. Francis Xavier); Won Championship series, 2–1 (Dalhousie)	Won Quarterfinal series, 2–0 (Wilfrid Laurier); Lost Semifinal, 4–5 (Alberta)
1986–87	AUAA	24	20	4	0	–	–	.833	T–1st	27	21	6	0	.778	Lost Semifinal series, 1–2 (St. Francis Xavier)	
1987–88	AUAA	26	17	9	0	–	–	34	T–4th	31	19	12	0	.613	Won Semifinal series, 2–1 (St. Francis Xavier); Lost Championship series, 0–2 (Prince Edward Island)	
1988–89	AUAA	26	23	3	0	–	–	46	1st	32	27	5	0	.844	Won Semifinal series, 2–1 (Dalhousie); Won Championship series, 2–0 (St. Thomas)	Lost Semifinal, 4–8 (Wilfrid Laurier)
1989–90	AUAA	21	16	5	0	–	–	32	T–1st	30	24	6	0	.800	Won Quarterfinal series, 2–1 (St. Thomas); Won Semifinal series, 2–0 (Dalhousie); Won Championship series, 2–0 (Prince Edward Island)	Won Semifinal, 5–4 (Calgary); Won Championship, 2–1 (Wilfrid Laurier)
1990–91	AUAA	26	11	9	6	–	–	28	T–4th	31	13	12	6	.516	Won Division Semifinal series, 2–1 (New Brunswick); Lost Division Final series, 1–2 (Prince Edward Island)	
1991–92	AUAA	25	9	14	2	–	–	20	8th	27	9	16	2	.370	Lost Quarterfinal series, 0–2 (New Brunswick)	
1992–93	AUAA	26	13	12	1	–	–	27	4th	31	15	15	1	.500	Won Quarterfinal series, 2–1 (St. Thomas); Lost Semifinal series, 0–2 (New Brunswick)	
1993–94	AUAA	26	10	11	5	–	–	25	7th	32	13	14	5	.484	Won Quarterfinal series, 2–1 (St. Thomas); Lost Semifinal series, 1–2 (New Brunswick)	
1994–95	AUAA	26	15	7	4	–	–	34	4th	31	21	9	1	.694	Won Quarterfinal series, 2–0 (Prince Edward Island); Won Semifinal series, 2–0 (St. Thomas); Won Championship series, 2–0 (Acadia)	Won Semifinal, 5–4 (Western); Won Championship, 5–1 (Guelph)
1995–96	AUAA	26	13	11	2	–	–	28	6th	31	15	14	2	.516	Won Quarterfinal series, 2–1 (St. Thomas); Lost Semifinal series, 0–2 (Prince Edward Island)	
1996–97	AUAA	28	11	15	2	–	–	24	7th	30	11	17	2	.400	Lost Quarterfinal series, 0–2 (New Brunswick)	
1997–98	AUAA	28	11	14	3	0	–	25	T–6th	30	11	16	3	.417	Lost Quarterfinal series, 0–2 (St. Thomas)	
1998–99	AUS	26	12	11	3	1	–	28	T–5th	37	20	14	3	.393	Won Quarterfinal series, 2–1 (New Brunswick); Won Semifinal series, 2–0 (St. Thomas); Won Championship series, 2–1 (Acadia)	Won Group 1 Round-Robin, 4–3 (Windsor), 5–4 (Saskatchewan); Lost Championship, 2–6 (Alberta)
1999–00	AUS	26	14	12	0	1	–	29	5th	28	14	14	0	.500	Lost Quarterfinal series, 0–2 (New Brunswick)	
2000–01	AUS	27	7	16	4	2	–	20	7th	27	7	16	4	.333		
2001–02	AUS	28	16	9	2	1	–	35	3rd	33	18	13	2	.576	Won Quarterfinal series, 2–1 (St. Francis Xavier); Lost Semifinal series, 0–2 (Saint Mary's)	
2002–03	AUS	28	9	18	0	1	–	19	8th	28	9	19	0	.321		
2003–04	AUS	28	8	15	3	2	–	21	8th	28	8	17	3	.339		
2004–05	AUS	28	14	8	4	2	–	34	T–1st	37	20	13	4	.595	Won Semifinal series, 2–0 (Saint Mary's); Won Championship series, 3–2 (Acadia)	Lost Group B Round-Robin, 0–3 (Saskatchewan), 8–3 (Western)
2005–06	AUS	28	18	8	1	1	–	38	2nd	30	18	11	1	.617	Lost Semifinal series, 0–2 (New Brunswick)	
2006–07	AUS	28	22	4	–	2	–	46	1st	36	29	7	0	.806	Won Semifinal series, 3–0 (St. Thomas); Won Championship series, 2–0 (New Brunswick)	Won Group A Round-Robin, 5–3 (St. Francis Xavier), 5–4 (Wilfrid Laurier); Lost Championship, 2–3 (New Brunswick)
2007–08	AUS	28	17	10	–	1	–	35	3rd	28	17	11	0	.607	Won Quarterfinal series, 2–0 (Acadia); Lost Semifinal series, 0–3 (Saint Mary's)	Lost Group 2 Round-Robin, 2–1 (Alberta), 0–3 (McGill)
2008–09	AUS	28	16	8	–	4	–	36	3rd	35	19	16	0	.543	Won Quarterfinal series, 2–1 (Prince Edward Island); Lost Semifinal series, 1–3 (Saint Mary's)	
2009–10	AUS	28	9	16	–	3	–	21	6th	30	9	21	0	.300	Lost Quarterfinal series, 0–2 (Saint Mary's)	
2010–11	AUS	28	10	15	–	3	–	23	7th	28	10	18	0	.357		
2011–12	AUS	28	18	9	–	1	–	37	3rd	40	24	16	0	.600	Won Quarterfinal series, 2–1 (St. Francis Xavier); Won Semifinal series, 3–1 (Saint Mary's); Lost Championship series, 0–3 (New Brunswick)	Lost Group A Round-Robin, 3–6 (McGill), 5–1 (Saskatchewan)
2012–13	AUS	28	12	10	–	6	0	30	6th	31	13	18	0	.419	Lost Quarterfinal series, 1–2 (Acadia)	
2013–14	AUS	28	17	11	–	0	0	34	8th	34	20	14	0	.588	Won Quarterfinal series, 2–0 (St. Francis Xavier); Lost Semifinal series, 1–3 (Acadia)	
2014–15	AUS	28	11	14	–	2	1	25	6th	31	12	18	1	.403	Lost Quarterfinal series, 1–2 (Saint Mary's)	
2015–16	AUS	28	13	13	–	2	0	28	5th	30	13	17	0	.433	Lost Quarterfinal series, 0–2 (Saint Mary's)	
2016–17	AUS	30	10	17	–	3	0	23	6th	32	10	22	0	.313	Lost Quarterfinal series, 0–2 (St. Francis Xavier)	
2017–18	AUS	30	3	24	–	2	1	9	7th	30	3	26	1	.117		
2018–19	AUS	30	14	12	–	3	1	32	5th	32	14	17	1	.453	Lost Quarterfinal series, 0–2 (Prince Edward Island)	
2019–20	AUS	30	13	11	–	5	1	32	4th	37	15	21	1	.419	Won Quarterfinal series, 2–0 (St. Francis Xavier); Lost Semifinal series, 0–3 (New Brunswick); Lost Third Place series, 0–2 (Saint Mary's)	
2020–21	Season cancelled due to COVID-19 pandemic															
2021–22	AUS	24	6	15	–	1	2	15	T–6th	30	9	19	2	.333	Won Play-In, 3–2 (OT) (Acadia); Won Quarterfinal series, 2–1 (Dalhousie); Lost Semifinal series, 0–2 (New Brunswick)	
2022–23	AUS	30	11	17	–	1	1	24	6th	37	14	22	1	.392	Won Quarterfinal series, 2–1 (Prince Edward Island); Lost Semifinal series, 1–3 (New Brunswick)	
2023–24	AUS	30	16	11	–	3	0	35	2nd	36	19	17	0	.528	Won Semifinal series, 3–0 (St. Francis Xavier); Lost Championship series, 0–2 (New Brunswick)	Lost Quarterfinal, 1–5 (Quebec–Trois-Rivières)
Totals										GP	W	L	T/SOL	%	Championships	
Regular Season										1443	736	645	62	.532	7 AUAA Championships, 2 AUS Championship	
Conference Post-season										180	80	100	0	.444	8 AUAA Championships, 3 AUS Championships	
U Sports Postseason										33	19	13	1	.591	16 National tournament appearance	
Regular Season and Postseason Record										1656	835	758	63	.523	4 National Championships	

Note: Moncton total do not include results from the St. Joseph's period.

== See also ==
- Moncton Aigles Bleues women's ice hockey
