= UPEI Panthers men's ice hockey =

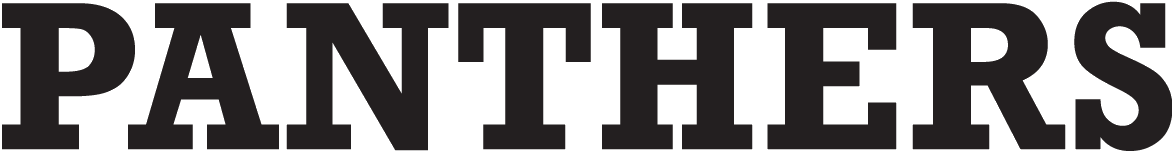
- University: University of Prince Edward Island
- Conference: AUS
- Head coach: Forbes MacPherson; Since 2010–11 season
- Arena: MacLauchlan Arena; Charlottetown, Prince Edward Island
- Colors: Green and Black

U Sports tournament appearances
- Saint Dunstan's: 1965 UPEI: 1985, 1987, 1988, 1991, 2023

Conference tournament champions
- 1985, 1987, 1988, 1991

The UPEI Panthers men's ice hockey team is an ice hockey team representing the UPEI Panthers athletics program of University of Prince Edward Island. The team is a member of the Atlantic University Sport conference and compete in U Sports. The team plays their home games at the MacLauchlan Arena in Charlottetown, Prince Edward Island.

== History ==
The University of Prince Edward Island was formed in 1969 when Saint Dunstan's University merged with Prince of Wales College. The ice hockey team was arranged in the college's first year and assumed Saint Dunstan's spot in the MIAA. UPEI had its best run to date in the late 80s and early 90s, winning four league championships.

=== Saint Dunstan's ===
The Saint Dunstan's Saints played varsity ice hockey from 1935 until its amalgamation in 1969. The team won four league championships and reached the CIAU championship game in 1965.

== Season-by-season results ==
=== Saint Dunstan's ===
==== Senior and collegiate play ====
Note: GP = Games played, W = Wins, L = Losses, T = Ties, Pts = Points

U Sports Champion	U Sports Semifinalist	Conference regular season champions	Conference Division Champions	Conference Playoff Champions

Season	Conference	Regular Season											Conference Tournament Results	National Tournament Results
Season	Conference	Conference						Overall					Conference Tournament Results	National Tournament Results
Season	Conference	GP	W	L	T	Pts*	Finish	GP	W	L	T	%	Conference Tournament Results	National Tournament Results
Junior and Senior Hockey
1935–36	Independent	–	–	–	–	–	–	?	?	?	?	?		
1936–37	Independent	–	–	–	–	–	–	?	?	?	?	?		
1937–38	Independent	–	–	–	–	–	–	?	?	?	?	?		
Senior and Collegiate Hockey
1938–39	MIAA	6	3	3	0	6	?	?	?	?	?	?		
1939–40	MIAA	6	4	2	0	8	?	?	?	?	?	?	Lost Championship, 0–3 (Acadia)	
1940–41	Independent	–	–	–	–	–	–	?	?	?	?	?		
Program suspended due to World War II
1945–46	MIAA	0	0	0	0	–	–	?	?	?	?	?	Lost Quarterfinal series, 3–13 (St. Joseph's)	
1946–47	MIAA	0	0	0	0	–	–	?	?	?	?	?	Won Quarterfinal series, 11–5 (Mount Allison); Won Semifinal series, 13–10 (St. Thomas); Won Championship, 8–6 (St. Francis Xavier)	
1947–48	Independent	–	–	–	–	–	–	?	?	?	?	?	Won Semifinal series, 10–3 (New Brunswick); Lost Championship, 13–24 (Acadia)	
1948–49	MIAA	0	0	0	0	–	–	?	?	?	?	?	Lost Quarterfinal series, 11–13 (St. Thomas)	
1949–50	MIAA	6	1	5	0	.167	6th	?	?	?	?	?		
1950–51	MIAA	0	0	0	0	–	–	?	?	?	?	?	Lost Quarterfinal series, 9–16 (St. Thomas)	
1951–52	MIAA	0	0	0	0	–	–	?	?	?	?	?	Won Quarterfinal series, forfeit (St. Thomas); Lost Semifinal series, 3–14 (New Brunswick)	
1952–53	MIAA	0	0	0	0	–	–	?	?	?	?	?	Lost Quarterfinal series, 7–13 (Mount Allison)	
1953–54	MIAA	0	0	0	0	–	–	?	?	?	?	?	Won Quarterfinal series, 2–12 (Mount Allison)	
Totals								GP	W	L	T	%	Championships	
Regular Season								?	?	?	?	?	12 MIAA Division Championships, 6 MIAA Championships	
Conference Post-season								?	?	?	?	?	4 MIAA Championships	
Regular Season and Postseason Record								?	?	?	?	?		

==== Collegiate only ====
Note: GP = Games played, W = Wins, L = Losses, T = Ties, OTL = Overtime Losses, SOL = Shootout Losses, Pts = Points

U Sports Champion	U Sports Semifinalist	Conference regular season champions	Conference Division Champions	Conference Playoff Champions

Season	Conference	Regular Season													Conference Tournament Results	National Tournament Results
Season	Conference	Conference								Overall					Conference Tournament Results	National Tournament Results
Season	Conference	GP	W	L	T	OTL	SOL	Pts*	Finish	GP	W	L	T	%	Conference Tournament Results	National Tournament Results
1954–55	MIAA	6	6	0	0	–	–	12	1st	8	6	2	0	.750	Lost Championship series, 1–17 (St. Francis Xavier)	
1955–56	MIAA	6	4	2	0	–	–	8	T–3rd	6	4	2	0	.667		
1956–57	MIAA	6	3	2	1	–	–	7	4th	6	3	2	1	.583		
1957–58	MIAA	4	0	4	0	–	–	0	8th	4	0	4	0	.000		
1958–59	MIAA	6	1	5	0	–	–	2	8th	6	1	5	0	.167		
1959–60	MIAA	6	1	5	0	–	–	2	9th	6	1	5	0	.167		
1960–61	MIAA	6	0	6	0	–	–	0	9th	6	0	6	0	.000		
1961–62	MIAA	6	1	5	0	–	–	2	8th	6	1	5	0	.167		
1962–63	MIAA	11	4	4	3	–	–	11	4th	11	4	4	3	.500		
1963–64	MIAA	11	8	3	0	–	–	16	2nd	11	8	3	0	.727		
1964–65	MIAA	11	10	1	0	–	–	20	1st	13	11	2	0	.846		Won Semifinal, 3–1 (Sir George Williams); Lost Championship, 2–9 (Manitoba)
1965–66	MIAA	14	10	4	0	–	–	20	2nd	14	10	4	0	.714		
1966–67	MIAA	13	10	1	1	–	–	21	2nd	12	10	1	1	.875		
1967–68	MIAA	16	8	8	0	–	–	16	6th	16	8	8	0	.500		
1968–69	AIAA	18	15	2	1	–	–	31	1st	19	15	3	1	.816	Lost Semifinal, 2–4 (St. Thomas)	
Totals										GP	W	L	T	%	Championships	
Regular Season										140	81	53	6	.600	2 West Division Titles, 3 MIAA Championships	
Conference Post-season										3	0	3	0	.000		
U Sports Postseason										2	1	1	0	.500	1 National tournament appearance	
Regular Season and Postseason Record										145	82	57	6	.586		

Note: Totals include results from 1954 to 1955 onward.

=== UPEI ===
Note: GP = Games played, W = Wins, L = Losses, T = Ties, OTL = Overtime Losses, SOL = Shootout Losses, Pts = Points

U Sports Champion	U Sports Semifinalist	Conference regular season champions	Conference Division Champions	Conference Playoff Champions

Season	Conference	Regular Season													Conference Tournament Results	National Tournament Results
Season	Conference	Conference								Overall					Conference Tournament Results	National Tournament Results
Season	Conference	GP	W	L	T	OTL	SOL	Pts*	Finish	GP	W	L	T	%	Conference Tournament Results	National Tournament Results
1969–70	AIAA	18	9	8	1	–	–	19	6th	18	9	8	1	.528		
1970–71	AIAA	18	13	5	0	–	–	26	4th	19	13	6	0	.684	Lost Semifinal, 1–5 (Saint Mary's)	
1971–72	AIAA	18	14	4	0	–	–	28	2nd	20	15	5	0	.750	Won Semifinal, 5–3 (Dalhousie); Lost Championship, 1–5 (Saint Mary's)	
1972–73	AIAA	20	11	7	2	–	–	.600	4th	21	11	8	2	.571	Lost Semifinal, 1–9 (Saint Mary's)	
1973–74	AUAA	20	10	8	2	–	–	.550	5th	20	10	8	2	.550		
1974–75	AUAA	18	7	11	0	–	–	14	7th	18	7	11	0	.389		
1975–76	AUAA	16	7	9	0	–	–	14	5th	16	7	9	0	.438		
1976–77	AUAA	20	12	7	1	–	–	25	4th	22	12	9	1	.568	Lost Semifinal series, 0–2 (St. Francis Xavier)	
1977–78	AUAA	20	11	7	2	–	–	24	3rd	22	11	9	2	.545	Lost Semifinal series, 0–2 (St. Francis Xavier)	
1978–79	AUAA	20	10	9	1	–	–	21	4th	22	10	11	1	.477	Lost Semifinal series, 0–2 (Saint Mary's)	
1979–80	AUAA	27	12	15	0	–	–	24	7th	27	12	15	0	.444		
1980–81	AUAA	21	8	12	1	–	–	17	7th	22	8	13	1	.386	Lost Quarterfinal, 2–5 (Dalhousie)	
1981–82	AUAA	26	16	9	1	–	–	33	T–5th	29	18	10	1	.638	Won Pool 1 Round-Robin, 4–3 (Dalhousie), 9–3 (New Brunswick); Lost Championship series, 0–2 (Moncton)	
1982–83	AUAA	24	11	11	2	–	–	24	5th	24	11	11	2	.500		
1983–84	AUAA	24	17	7	0	–	–	34	3rd	26	17	9	0	.654	Lost Semifinal series, 0–2 (Moncton)	
1984–85	AUAA	24	20	4	0	–	–	40	1st	30	24	6	0	.800	Won Semifinal series, 2–0 (Dalhousie); Won Championship series, 2–0 (Moncton)	Lost East Regional series, 0–2 (Ottawa)
1985–86	AUAA	24	19	5	0	–	–	.792	2nd	27	20	7	0	.741	Lost Semifinal series, 1–2 (Dalhousie)	
1986–87	AUAA	24	20	4	0	–	–	.833	T–1st	30	25	5	0	.833	Won Semifinal series, 2–0 (Dalhousie); Won Championship series, 2–0 (St. Francis Xavier)	Lost Pool 1 Round-Robin, 3–1 (Western Ontario), 0–3 (Saskatchewan)
1987–88	AUAA	26	22	2	2	–	–	46	1st	30	26	4	0	.867	Won Semifinal series, 2–1 (Acadia); Won Championship series, 2–0 (Moncton)	Lost Semifinal, 1–3 (Western Ontario)
1988–89	AUAA	26	17	9	0	–	–	34	T–4th	29	18	11	0	.621	Lost Semifinal series, 1–2 (St. Thomas)	
1989–90	AUAA	21	13	8	0	–	–	26	3rd	28	17	11	0	.607	Won Quarterfinal series, 2–1 (New Brunswick); Won Semifinal series, 2–0 (Acadia); Lost Championship series, 0–2 (Moncton)	
1990–91	AUAA	26	14	11	1	–	–	27	2nd	34	18	13	3	.574	Won Quarterfinal series, 2–0 (St. Thomas); Won Semifinal series, 2–1 (Moncton); Won Championship series, 2–1 (Dalhousie)	Lost Semifinal, 3–4 (Quebec–Trois-Rivières)
1991–92	AUAA	24	13	9	2	–	–	28	4th	30	17	11	2	.600	Won Quarterfinal series, 2–0 (St. Thomas); Won Semifinal series, 2–0 (New Brunswick); Lost Championship series, 0–2 (Acadia)	
1992–93	AUAA	26	7	15	4	–	–	18	8th	28	7	17	4	.321	Lost Quarterfinal series, 0–2 (New Brunswick)	
1993–94	AUAA	26	5	16	5	–	–	15	8th	28	5	18	5	.268	Lost Quarterfinal series, 0–2 (New Brunswick)	
1994–95	AUAA	26	13	11	2	–	–	28	5th	28	13	13	2	.500	Lost Quarterfinal series, 0–2 (Moncton)	
1995–96	AUAA	26	15	10	1	–	–	31	T–3rd	34	20	13	1	.603	Won Quarterfinal series, 2–1 (New Brunswick); Won Semifinal series, 2–0 (Moncton); Lost Championship series, 1–2 (Acadia)	
1996–97	AUAA	28	12	14	2	–	–	26	6th	30	12	16	2	.433	Lost Quarterfinal series, 0–2 (St. Thomas)	
1997–98	AUAA	28	11	16	1	2	–	25	6th	31	12	18	1	.403	Lost Quarterfinal series, 1–2 (New Brunswick)	
1998–99	AUS	26	6	19	1	3	–	16	8th	28	6	21	1	.232	Lost Quarterfinal series, 0–2 (St. Thomas)	
1999–00	AUS	26	6	20	0	2	–	14	7th	28	6	22	0	.214	Lost Quarterfinal series, 0–2 (St. Thomas)	
2000–01	AUS	28	8	17	2	1	–	19	8th	27	8	17	2	.333		
2001–02	AUS	28	12	11	3	2	–	29	5th	30	12	15	3	.450	Lost Quarterfinal series, 0–2 (New Brunswick)	
2002–03	AUS	28	10	15	3	0	–	23	6th	30	10	17	3	.383	Lost Quarterfinal series, 0–2 (St. Francis Xavier)	
2003–04	AUS	28	13	13	2	0	–	28	5th	30	13	15	2	.467	Lost Quarterfinal series, 0–2 (Dalhousie)	
2004–05	AUS	28	11	11	6	0	–	28	6th	30	11	13	6	.467	Lost Quarterfinal series, 0–2 (Saint Mary's)	
2005–06	AUS	28	8	20	0	0	–	16	7th	28	8	20	0	.286		
2006–07	AUS	28	9	17	–	2	–	20	7th	28	9	19	0	.321		
2007–08	AUS	28	10	16	–	2	–	22	7th	28	10	18	0	.357		
2008–09	AUS	28	13	12	–	3	–	29	6th	31	14	17	0	.452	Lost Quarterfinal series, 1–2 (Moncton)	
2009–10	AUS	28	15	11	–	2	–	32	4th	30	15	15	0	.500	Lost Quarterfinal series, 0–2 (St. Francis Xavier)	
2010–11	AUS	28	14	11	–	3	–	31	5th	30	14	16	0	.467	Lost Quarterfinal series, 0–2 (Acadia)	
2011–12	AUS	28	18	10	–	0	–	36	4th	34	20	14	0	.588	Won Quarterfinal series, 2–1 (Acadia); Lost Semifinal series, 0–3 (New Brunswick)	
2012–13	AUS	28	15	11	–	2	0	32	5th	34	18	16	0	.529	Won Quarterfinal series, 2–0 (St. Francis Xavier); Lost Semifinal series, 1–3 (New Brunswick)	
2013–14	AUS	28	15	10	–	2	1	33	4th	31	16	14	1	.532	Lost Quarterfinal series, 1–2 (Saint Mary's)	
2014–15	AUS	28	13	13	–	2	0	28	5th	30	13	17	0	.433	Lost Quarterfinal series, 1–2 (St. Francis Xavier)	
2015–16	AUS	28	11	14	–	2	1	25	6th	33	13	19	1	.409	Won Quarterfinal series, 2–0 (Acadia); Lost Semifinal series, 0–3 (New Brunswick)	
2016–17	AUS	30	11	15	–	2	2	26	5th	33	12	19	2	.394	Lost Quarterfinal series, 1–2 (Saint Mary's)	
2017–18	AUS	30	11	18	–	1	0	23	5th	33	12	21	0	.364	Lost Quarterfinal series, 1–2 (Saint Mary's)	
2018–19	AUS	30	15	12	–	1	2	33	4th	35	17	16	2	.514	Won Quarterfinal series, 2–0 (Moncton); Lost Semifinal series, 0–3 (New Brunswick)	
2019–20	AUS	30	10	15	–	4	1	25	6th	32	10	21	1	.328	Lost Quarterfinal series, 0–2 (Saint Mary's)	
2020–21	Season cancelled due to COVID-19 pandemic															
2021–22	AUS	22	9	9	–	3	1	22	4th	24	9	14	1	.396	Lost Quarterfinal series, 0–2 (Saint Mary's)	
2022–23	AUS	30	17	10	–	2	1	37	3rd	33	18	14	1	.561	Lost Quarterfinal series, 1–2 (Moncton)	Won Quarterfinal, 4–2 (Calgary); Lost Semifinal, 1–4 (Alberta); Lost Bronze Medal Game, 2–3 (Quebec–Trois-Rivières)
2023–24	AUS	30	12	14	–	1	3	28	5th	32	12	17	3	.422	Lost Quarterfinal series, 0–2 (Saint Mary's)	
Totals										GP	W	L	T/SOL	%	Championships	
Regular Season										1367	661	644	62	.506	3 MacAdam Division Titles, 3 AUAA Championships	
Conference Post-season										132	49	83	0	.371	4 AUAA Championships	
U Sports Postseason										9	2	7	0	.222	5 National tournament appearances	
Regular Season and Postseason Record										1505	711	732	62	.493		

Note: UPEI totals do not include results from Saint Dunstan's.

== See also ==
UPEI Panthers women's ice hockey
