= Dalhousie Tigers men's ice hockey =

University women's ice hockey program

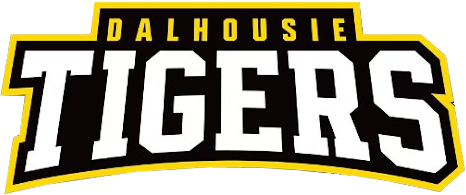
- University: Dalhousie University
- Conference: AUS
- First season: 1962–63
- Head coach: Chris Donnelly; 12th season
- Assistant coaches: Andrew Wigginton; Todd Parker; Jack Hanley
- Arena: Halifax Forum; Halifax, Nova Scotia
- Colors: Black, Gold, and White

U Sports tournament appearances
- 1979, 1986, 2004

Conference tournament champions
- 1979

The Dalhousie Tigers men's ice hockey team is an ice hockey team representing the Dalhousie Tigers athletics program of Dalhousie University. The team is a member of the Atlantic University Sport conference and compete in U Sports. The team plays their home games at the Halifax Forum in Halifax, Nova Scotia.

== History ==
Though Dalhousie has a history of fielding an ice hockey team as far back as 1894, the school played its first official season of varsity men's hockey in 1962. The program's best period was initiated by a run to the CIAU championship gam in 1979 that saw the team win its first conference championship. The Tigers routinely earned a playoff berth over the succeeding 25 years, however, they were never able to capture a second conference title in that span. In the mid 2000s, the program slipped to the bottom of the standings and has remained there since (as of 2023).

=== Nova Scotia Tech ===
In 1997, the Technical University of Nova Scotia was absorbed by Dalhousie. Nova Scotia Tech had previously fielded a varsity ice hockey team playing for approximately 40 years from the 1920s through the 1960s. When the school was merged with Dalhousie, the Tigers did not assume the history of Nova Scotia Tech as both teams were contemporaries.

== Season-by-season results ==
=== Varsity ===
Note: GP = Games played, W = Wins, L = Losses, T = Ties, OTL = Overtime Losses, SOL = Shootout Losses, Pts = Points

U Sports Champion	U Sports Semifinalist	Conference regular season champions	Conference Division Champions	Conference Playoff Champions

Season	Conference	Regular Season													Conference Tournament Results	National Tournament Results
Season	Conference	Conference								Overall					Conference Tournament Results	National Tournament Results
Season	Conference	GP	W	L	T	OTL	SOL	Pts*	Finish	GP	W	L	T	%	Conference Tournament Results	National Tournament Results
1962–63	MIAA	12	5	7	0	–	–	12	8th	12	5	7	0	.417		
1963–64	MIAA	12	5	6	1	–	–	11	6th	12	5	6	1	.458		
1964–65	MIAA	13	3	10	0	–	–	9	6th	13	3	10	0	.231		
1965–66	MIAA	14	3	11	0	–	–	6	7th	14	3	11	0	.214		
1966–67	MIAA	14	3	9	2	–	–	8	6th	14	3	9	2	.286		
1967–68	MIAA	16	1	15	0	–	–	2	9th	16	1	15	0	.063		
1968–69	AIAA	17	5	12	0	–	–	10	T–7th	17	5	12	0	.294		
1969–70	AIAA	18	10	8	0	–	–	20	5th	18	10	8	0	.556		
1970–71	AIAA	18	16	2	0	–	–	32	2nd	20	17	3	0	.850	Won Semifinal, 7–6 (St. Francis Xavier); Lost Championship, 4–8 (Saint Mary's)	
1971–72	AIAA	18	10	8	0	–	–	20	T–3rd	19	10	9	0	.526	Lost Semifinal, 3–5 (Prince Edward Island)	
1972–73	AIAA	21	7	14	0	–	–	.333	8th	21	7	14	0	.333		
1973–74	AUAA	21	6	11	4	–	–	.381	8th	21	6	11	4	.381		
1974–75	AUAA	18	12	6	0	–	–	24	T–3rd	19	12	7	0	.632	Lost Semifinal, 3–7 (Saint Mary's)	
1975–76	AUAA	16	6	9	1	–	–	13	6th	16	6	9	1	.406		
1976–77	AUAA	20	6	13	1	–	–	13	6th	20	6	13	1	.325		
1977–78	AUAA	20	9	9	2	–	–	20	5th	20	9	9	2	.500		
1978–79	AUAA	20	13	7	0	–	–	26	2nd	28	18	9	1	.661	Won Semifinal series, 2–0 (Moncton); Won Championship series, 2–1 (Saint Mary's)	Won Group 2 Round-Robin, 5–5 (Guelph), 7–3 (Quebec–Chicoutimi); Lost Championship, 1–5 (Alberta)
1979–80	AUAA	29	20	8	1	–	–	41	2nd	34	22	11	1	.662	Won Semifinal series, 2–1 (St. Francis Xavier); Lost Championship series, 0–2 (Moncton)	
1980–81	AUAA	24	13	10	1	–	–	27	3rd	28	15	12	1	.554	Won Quarterfinal, 5–2 (Prince Edward Island); Won Semifinal, 5–2 (Mount Allison); Lost Championship series, 0–2 (Moncton)	
1981–82	AUAA	26	17	6	3	–	–	37	1st	28	18	7	3	.696	Lost Semifinal Group 1 Round-Robin, 3–2 (New Brunswick), 3–4 (Prince Edward Island)	
1982–83	AUAA	24	18	6	0	–	–	36	2nd	30	21	9	0	.700	Won Semifinal series, 2–1 (Mount Allison); Lost Championship series, 1–2 (Moncton)	
1983–84	AUAA	24	8	15	1	–	–	17	7th	24	8	15	1	.354		
1984–85	AUAA	24	13	9	2	–	–	28	4th	26	13	11	2	.538	Lost Semifinal series, 0–2 (Prince Edward Island)	
1985–86	AUAA	25	18	7	0	–	–	.720	3rd	34	22	12	0	.647	Won Semifinal series, 2–1 (Prince Edward Island); Lost Championship series, 1–2 (Moncton)	Lost Quarterfinal series, 1–2 (York)
1986–87	AUAA	25	19	6	0	–	–	.760	3rd	27	19	8	0	.704	Lost Semifinal series, 0–2 (Prince Edward Island)	
1987–88	AUAA	26	17	9	0	–	–	34	T–4th	26	17	9	0	.654		
1988–89	AUAA	26	13	13	0	–	–	26	6th	31	16	15	0	.516	Won Quarterfinal series, 2–0 (Saint Mary's); Lost Semifinal series, 1–2 (Moncton)	
1989–90	AUAA	21	10	9	2	–	–	22	5th	25	12	11	2	.520	Won Quarterfinal series, 2–0 (St. Francis Xavier); Lost Semifinal series, 0–2 (Moncton)	
1990–91	AUAA	26	16	5	5	–	–	37	1st	34	21	8	5	.691	Won Division Semifinal series, 2–1 (St. Francis Xavier); Won Division Final series, 2–0 (Cape Breton); Lost Championship series, 1–2 (Prince Edward Island)	
1991–92	AUAA	25	13	8	4	–	–	30	3rd	31	16	11	4	.581	Won Quarterfinal series, 2–1 (Saint Mary's); Lost Semifinal series, 1–2 (Acadia)	
1992–93	AUAA	26	17	8	1	–	–	35	3rd	30	19	10	1	.650	Won Quarterfinal series, 2–0 (Saint Mary's); Lost Semifinal series, 0–2 (Acadia)	
1993–94	AUAA	26	19	3	4	–	–	42	1st	30	21	5	4	.767	Won Quarterfinal series, 2–0 (Saint Mary's); Lost Semifinal series, 0–2 (Acadia)	
1994–95	AUAA	26	18	7	1	–	–	37	3rd	31	21	9	1	.694	Won Quarterfinal series, 2–0 (Saint Mary's); Lost Semifinal series, 1–2 (Acadia)	
1995–96	AUAA	26	12	12	2	–	–	26	7th	31	15	14	2	.516	Won Quarterfinal series, 2–0 (St. Francis Xavier); Lost Semifinal series, 1–2 (Acadia)	
1996–97	AUAA	28	13	11	4	–	–	30	5th	33	16	13	4	.545	Won Quarterfinal series, 2–1 (St. Francis Xavier); Lost Semifinal series, 0–2 (Acadia)	
1997–98	AUAA	28	11	16	1	0	–	23	7th	30	11	18	1	.383	Lost Quarterfinal series, 0–2 (Acadia)	
1998–99	AUS	26	10	14	2	0	–	22	7th	28	10	16	2	.393	Lost Quarterfinal series, 0–2 (St. Francis Xavier)	
1999–00	AUS	26	5	21	0	5	–	15	7th	29	6	23	0	.207	Lost Quarterfinal series, 1–2 (Saint Mary's)	
2000–01	AUS	28	15	12	1	1	–	32	3rd	33	18	14	1	.561	Won Quarterfinal series, 2–0 (Saint Mary's); Lost Semifinal series, 1–2 (St. Thomas)	
2001–02	AUS	28	17	7	2	2	–	38	1st	35	21	12	2	.629	Won Semifinal series, 2–0 (New Brunswick); Lost Championship series, 2–3 (Saint Mary's)	
2002–03	AUS	28	16	9	3	0	–	35	2nd	31	17	11	3	.597	Lost Semifinal series, 1–2 (St. Francis Xavier)	
2003–04	AUS	28	11	9	2	6	–	30	4th	39	17	20	2	.462	Won Quarterfinal series, 2–1 (Prince Edward Island); Won Semifinal series, 2–0 (New Brunswick); Lost Championship series, 0–3 (St. Francis Xavier)	Lost Pool B Round-Robin, 0–5 (St. Francis Xavier), 4–2 (York); Won Bronze Medal Game, 4–1 (Alberta)
2004–05	AUS	28	8	15	4	1	–	21	7th	28	8	16	4	.357		
2005–06	AUS	28	3	25	0	0	–	6	8th	28	3	25	0	.107		
2006–07	AUS	28	7	16	–	5	–	19	8th	28	7	21	0	.250		
2007–08	AUS	28	5	20	–	3	–	13	8th	28	5	23	0	.179		
2008–09	AUS	28	4	23	–	1	–	9	8th	28	4	24	0	.143		
2009–10	AUS	28	8	16	–	4	–	20	7th	28	8	20	0	.286		
2010–11	AUS	28	13	15	–	0	–	26	6th	30	13	17	0	.433	Lost Quarterfinal series, 0–2 (St. Francis Xavier)	
2011–12	AUS	28	7	18	–	3	–	17	7th	28	7	21	0	.250		
2012–13	AUS	28	7	18	–	3	0	19	7th	28	7	21	0	.274		
2013–14	AUS	28	3	24	–	1	0	7	8th	28	3	25	0	.107		
2014–15	AUS	28	7	20	–	1	0	15	7th	28	7	21	0	.250		
2015–16	AUS	28	9	15	–	3	1	22	7th	28	9	18	1	.339		
2016–17	AUS	30	8	19	–	1	2	19	7th	30	8	20	2	.300		
2017–18	AUS	30	9	20	–	0	1	19	6th	32	9	22	1	.297	Lost Quarterfinal series, 0–2 (Acadia)	
2018–19	AUS	30	7	22	–	0	1	15	7th	30	7	22	1	.250		
2019–20	AUS	30	8	19	–	1	2	19	6th	30	8	20	2	.300		
2020–21	Season cancelled due to COVID-19 pandemic															
2021–22	AUS	23	11	11	–	1	0	23	3rd	26	12	14	0	.462	Lost Quarterfinal series, 1–2 (Moncton)	
2022–23	AUS	30	6	22	–	1	1	14	7th	30	6	23	1	.217		
2023–24	AUS	30	7	21	–	2	0	16	7th	30	7	23	0	.233		
Totals										GP	W	L	T	%	Championships	
Regular Season										1476	616	795	65	.439	3 AUAA Championships, 1 AUS Championship	
Conference Post-season										119	56	63	0	.479	1 AUAA Championship	
U Sports Postseason										9	4	4	1	.500	3 National tournament appearances	
Regular Season and Postseason Record										1604	676	862	66	.442		

== See also ==
- Dalhousie Tigers women's ice hockey
