= 1990 CIAU University Cup =

Canadian hockey tournament

Tournament details
- Venue(s): Varsity Arena, Toronto, Ontario
- Dates: March 15–17
- Teams: 4

Final positions
- Champions: Moncton Aigles Bleus (3rd title)
- Runners-up: Wilfrid Laurier Golden Hawks

Tournament statistics
- Games played: 3

Awards
- MVP: Rob Dopson (Wilfrid Laurier)

The 1990 CIAU Men's University Cup Hockey Tournament (28th annual) was held at the Varsity Arena in Toronto, Ontario. The Toronto Varsity Blues served as tournament host.

== Road to the Cup ==
=== AUAA playoffs ===
Quarterfinals
K1	Acadia	3	9	6
K4	Cape Breton	6	3	3
M2	Prince Edward Island	1	6	8
M3	New Brunswick	3	3	2
M1	Moncton	7	2	6
M4	St. Thomas	3	7	3
K2	Dalhousie	6	7	—
K3	St. Francis Xavier	5	3	—

Semifinals
K1	Acadia	4	3	—
M2	Prince Edward Island	7	8	—
M1	Moncton	5	7	—
K2	Dalhousie	4	0	—

Championship
M2	Prince Edward Island	2	2	—
M1	Moncton	3	6	—

Note: * denotes overtime period(s)

=== OUAA playoffs ===
Queen's Cup Quarterfinals
E1	Quebec–Trois-Rivières	7	7	—
E4	McGill	3	5	—
East
E2	Ottawa	5	3	2
E3	York	7	1	6
W1	Wilfrid Laurier	9	8	—
W4	Guelph	2	2	—
West
W2	Waterloo	2	5	8
W3	Windsor	3	2	4

Queen's Cup Semifinals
E1	Quebec–Trois-Rivières	3	4	8
E3	York	4	2	2
W1	Wilfrid Laurier	2	5	—
W2	Waterloo	1	2	—

Queen's Cup Final
E1	Quebec–Trois-Rivières	2	1	—
W1	Wilfrid Laurier	6	4	—

Note: * denotes overtime period(s)

=== Canada West playoffs ===
Semifinal
1	Calgary	2	4	—
4	Regina	1	0	—
2	Alberta	8	4	—
3	British Columbia	1	3	—

Championship
1	Calgary	5	6	—
2	Alberta	3	3	—

Note: * denotes overtime period(s)

== University Cup ==
The bracket matches rotated so that the Atlantic entry played the Western entry while the Ontario entry played the Quebec entry in the semifinals. All rounds were single elimination.

Team	Qualification	Record	Appearance	Last
Calgary Dinos	West: Canada West Champion	25–6–1	7th	1988
Moncton Aigles Bleus	Atlantic: AUAA Champion	22–6–0	9th	1989
Quebec–Trois-Rivières Patriotes	Quebec: OUAA Runner-up	19–8–2	4th	1987
Wilfrid Laurier Golden Hawks	Ontario: OUAA Champion	25–3–0	4th	1989

=== Bracket ===
Semifinals; March 15
A	Moncton	5
W	Calgary	4
O	Wilfrid Laurier	2
Q	Quebec–Trois-Rivières	1

Championship; March 17
A	Moncton	2
O	Wilfrid Laurier	1

Note: * denotes overtime period(s)

== Championship final ==
March 17, 1990	Moncton Aigles Bleus	2–1	Wilfrid Laurier Golden Hawks	Varsity Arena, Toronto, Ontario
