= AUAA men's ice hockey tournament =

Atlantic Universities Athletic Association men's ice hockey tournament
- Conference hockey championship
- Sport: Ice hockey
- Conference: Atlantic Intercollegiate Athletic Association; Atlantic Universities Athletic Association
- Format: Single-elimination
- Played: 1969–1998

The Atlantic Universities Athletic Association ice hockey tournament was an annual conference championship held between member teams.

== History ==
In 1968, the Maritime Intercollegiate Athletic Association, which had been founded in 1919, rebranded as the 'Atlantic Intercollegiate Athletic Association' (AIAA). Five years later, the league merged with the 'Atlantic Women's Intercollegiate Athletic Association' (AWIAA) to form the 'Atlantic Universities Athletic Association'. This combined league continued until 1998 when it was renamed Atlantic University Sport (AUS). The two leagues continued the process laid down by the MIAA by holding a postseason tournament each year and sending its champion to the University Cup tournament.

== Tournaments ==
=== 1969 ===
Seed	School	Standings	Seed	School	Standings
1	Saint Dunstan's	15–2–1	6	St. Francis Xavier	9–8–1
2	Saint Mary's	13–5–0	7	Dalhousie	5–12–0
3	Acadia	11–5–1	8	Moncton	5–12–0
4	St. Thomas	11–6–1	9	Memorial	4–13–1
5	New Brunswick	9–5–3	10	Mount Allison	2–16–0

Semifinals
1	Saint Dunstan's	2
4	St. Thomas	4
2	Saint Mary’s	6
3	Acadia	4

Championship
4	St. Thomas	2
2	Saint Mary’s	4

Note: * denotes overtime period(s)

=== 1970 ===
Seed	School	Standings	Seed	School	Standings
1	Saint Mary's	15–1–2	6	Prince Edward Island	9–8–1
2	St. Francis Xavier	15–3–0	7	Acadia	9–9–0
3	New Brunswick	11–5–2	8	Moncton	6–12–0
4	St. Thomas	10–7–1	9	Memorial	2–16–0
5	Dalhousie	10–8–0	10	Mount Allison	0–18–0

Semifinals
1	Saint Mary’s	7
4	St. Thomas	1
2	St. Francis Xavier	8
3	New Brunswick	1

Championship
1	Saint Mary’s	6
2	St. Francis Xavier	5

Note: * denotes overtime period(s)

=== 1971 ===
Seed	School	Standings	Seed	School	Standings
1	Saint Mary's	17–1–0	6	Moncton	7–11–0
2	Dalhousie	16–2–0	7	Mount Allison	5–13–0
3	St. Francis Xavier	14–4–0	8	New Brunswick	5–13–0
4	Prince Edward Island	13–5–0	9	St. Thomas	3–14–0
5	Acadia	8–10–0	10	Memorial	2–16–0

Semifinals
1	Saint Mary’s	5
4	Prince Edward Island	1
2	Dalhousie	7
3	St. Francis Xavier	6

Championship
1	Saint Mary’s	8
2	Dalhousie	4

Note: * denotes overtime period(s)

=== 1972 ===
Seed	School	Standings	Seed	School	Standings
1	Saint Mary's	15–2–1	6	Moncton	7–10–1
2	Prince Edward Island	14–4–0	7	New Brunswick	7–11–0
3	Dalhousie	10–8–0	8	St. Thomas	5–11–2
4	Memorial	10–8–0	9	St. Francis Xavier	5–12–1
5	Acadia	9–9–0	10	Mount Allison	5–12–1

Semifinals
1	Saint Mary’s	4
4	Memorial	2
2	Prince Edward Island	5
3	Dalhousie	3

Championship
1	Saint Mary’s	7
2	Prince Edward Island	1

Note: * denotes overtime period(s)

=== 1973 ===
Seed	School	Standings	Seed	School	Standings
1	Saint Mary's	20–0–0	6	New Brunswick	9–9–2
2	Moncton	14–6–0	7	St. Francis Xavier	9–12–0
3	Acadia	13–7–0	8	Dalhousie	7–14–0
4	Prince Edward Island	11–7–2	9	Memorial	2–14–0
5	Mount Allison	10–8–2	10	St. Thomas	1–19–0

Semifinals
1	Saint Mary’s	9
4	Prince Edward Island	1
2	Moncton	9
3	Acadia	2

Championship
1	Saint Mary’s	6
2	Moncton	1

Note: * denotes overtime period(s)

=== 1974 ===
North			South		
Seed	School	Standings	Seed	School	Standings
1	Moncton	14–5–1	1	Saint Mary's	19–2–0
2	New Brunswick	11–8–1	2	St. Francis Xavier	14–7–0
3	Prince Edward Island	10–8–2	3	Memorial	7–7–2
4	Mount Allison	10–9–1	4	Dalhousie	6–11–4
5	St. Thomas	0–20–0	5	Acadia	3–17–1

Semifinals
S1	Saint Mary’s	7
N2	New Brunswick	0
N1	Moncton	5
S2	St. Francis Xavier	1

Championship
S1	Saint Mary’s	12
N1	Moncton	2

Note: * denotes overtime period(s)

=== 1975 ===
Seed	School	Standings	Seed	School	Standings
1	Saint Mary's	16–1–1	6	New Brunswick	7–10–1
2	Moncton	14–4–0	7	Prince Edward Island	7–11–0
3	Acadia	12–6–0	8	Memorial	5–13–0
4	Dalhousie	12–6–0	9	Mount Allison	4–14–0
5	St. Francis Xavier	11–7–0	10	St. Thomas	1–17–0

Semifinals
1	Saint Mary’s	7
4	Dalhousie	3
2	Moncton	3
3	Acadia	7

Championship
1	Saint Mary’s	9
3	Acadia	2

Note: * denotes overtime period(s)

=== 1976 ===
Seed	School	Standings	Seed	School	Standings
1	Saint Mary's	15–1–0	6	Dalhousie	6–9–1
2	St. Francis Xavier	12–4–0	7	New Brunswick	5–11–0
3	Mount Allison	12–4–0	8	Acadia	3–13–0
4	Moncton	10–5–1	9	Memorial	1–15–0
5	Prince Edward Island	7–9–0			

Semifinals
1	Saint Mary’s	5
4	Moncton	9
2	St. Francis Xavier	9
3	Mount Allison	4

Championship
4	Moncton	5
2	St. Francis Xavier	7

Note: * denotes overtime period(s)

=== 1977 ===
Seed	School	Standings	Seed	School	Standings
1	St. Francis Xavier	16–2–2	5	Mount Allison	7–13–0
2	Saint Mary's	16–3–1	6	Dalhousie	6–13–1
3	Moncton	13–6–1	7	Acadia	6–14–0
4	Prince Edward Island	12–7–1	8	New Brunswick	1–19–0

Semifinals
1	St. Francis Xavier	6	4	-
4	Prince Edward Island	3	3	-
2	Saint Mary’s	7	10	-
3	Moncton	2	0	-

Championship
1	St. Francis Xavier	5	2	-
2	Saint Mary’s	6	3	-

Note: * denotes overtime period(s)

=== 1978 ===
Seed	School	Standings	Seed	School	Standings
1	Saint Mary's	18–2–0	5	Dalhousie	9–9–2
2	St. Francis Xavier	13–4–3	6	Mount Allison	6–13–1
3	Prince Edward Island	11–7–2	7	New Brunswick	4–14–2
4	Moncton	11–9–0	8	Acadia	2–16–2

Semifinals
1	Saint Mary’s	6	6	-
4	Moncton	5	3	-
2	St. Francis Xavier	8	7	-
3	Prince Edward Island	4	5	-

Championship
1	Saint Mary’s	8	4	3	4	2
2	St. Francis Xavier	4	6	4	3	4

Note: * denotes overtime period(s)

=== 1979 ===
Seed	School	Standings	Seed	School	Standings
1	Saint Mary's	15–4–1	5	St. Francis Xavier	10–9–1
2	Dalhousie	13–7–0	6	Acadia	8–11–1
3	Moncton	10–8–2	7	Mount Allison	7–12–1
4	Prince Edward Island	10–9–1	8	New Brunswick	3–16–1

Semifinals
1	Saint Mary’s	4	4	4
4	Prince Edward Island	5	2	3
2	Dalhousie	5	4	-
3	Moncton	2	1	-

Championship
1	Saint Mary’s	3	3	4
2	Dalhousie	2	6	5

Note: * denotes overtime period(s)

=== 1980 ===
East			West		
Seed	School	Standings	Seed	School	Standings
1	Dalhousie	20–8–1	1	Moncton	22–4–1
2	Saint Mary's	17–10–2	2	New Brunswick	15–11–1
3	St. Francis Xavier	16–12–1	3	Mount Allison	14–13–0
4	Acadia	10–18–1	4	Prince Edward Island	12–15–0
			5	St. Thomas	4–23–0
			6	Memorial	1–17–1

Note: The two wild card teams were selected by a 3-person committee.

Quarterfinals
E2	Saint Mary’s	4
WC	Mount Allison	0
W2	New Brunswick	4
WC	St. Francis Xavier	7

Semifinals
W1	Moncton	4	6	5
E2	Saint Mary’s	5	5	4
E1	Dalhousie	7	1	4
WC	St. Francis Xavier	3	3	2

Championship
W1	Moncton	10	6	-
E1	Dalhousie	7	0	-

Note: * denotes overtime period(s)

=== 1981 ===
Kelly			MacAdam		
Seed	School	Standings	Seed	School	Standings
1	Moncton	18–5–1	1	Mount Allison	13–4–4
2	Dalhousie	13–10–1	2	New Brunswick	10–10–1
3	Saint Mary's	13–11–0	3	Prince Edward Island	8–12–1
4	St. Francis Xavier	11–13–0	4	St. Thomas	8–13–0
5	Acadia	10–14–0	5	Memorial	2–14–0

Quarterfinals
M2	New Brunswick	4
K3	Saint Mary’s	0
K2	Dalhousie	5
M3	Prince Edward Island	2

Semifinals
K1	Moncton	8
M2	New Brunswick	5
M1	Mount Allison	3
K2	Dalhousie	5

Championship
K1	Moncton	4	8	-
K2	Dalhousie	3	4	-

Note: * denotes overtime period(s)

=== 1982 ===
Kelly			MacAdam		
Seed	School	Standings	Seed	School	Standings
1	Dalhousie	17–6–3	1	Mount Allison	17–9–0
2	Moncton	17–8–1	2	Prince Edward Island	16–9–1
3	Saint Mary's	16–7–3	3	New Brunswick	16–9–1
4	Acadia	12–13–1	4	Memorial	5–20–1
5	St. Francis Xavier	6–17–3	5	St. Thomas	0–24–2

	Pool 1	DAL	PEI	UNB	Overall
1	Dalhousie		L 3–4	W 3–2	1–1
4	Prince Edward Island	W 4–3		W 9–3	2–0
5	New Brunswick	L 2–3	L 3–9		0–2

	Pool 2	MAU	MON	SMU	Overall
2	Mount Allison		L 3–7	W 4–3	1–1
3	Moncton	W 7–3		W 4–1	2–0
6	Saint Mary’s	L 3–4	L 1–4		0–2

Championship
K2	Moncton	7	6	-
M2	Prince Edward Island	4	3	-

Note: * denotes overtime period(s)

=== 1983 ===
Seed	School	Standings	Seed	School	Standings
1	Moncton	20–3–1	6	New Brunswick	10–14–0
2	Dalhousie	18–6–0	7	Acadia	8–14–2
3	Mount Allison	12–10–2	8	St. Francis Xavier	7–14–3
4	Saint Mary's	12–11–1	9	St. Thomas	4–19–1
5	Prince Edward Island	11–11–2			

Semifinals
1	Moncton	7	9	-
4	Saint Mary’s	3	1	-
2	Dalhousie	3	11	4
3	Mount Allison	5	2	3

Championship
1	Moncton	3	6	7
2	Dalhousie	4	3	3

Note: * denotes overtime period(s)

=== 1984 ===
Seed	School	Standings	Seed	School	Standings
1	New Brunswick	21–3–0	6	Mount Allison	10–14–0
2	Moncton	19–5–0	7	St. Francis Xavier	10–14–0
3	Prince Edward Island	17–7–0	8	St. Thomas	4–20–0
4	Acadia	15–9–0	9	Saint Mary's	0–24–0
5	Dalhousie	10–13–1			

Note: After the conclusion of the regular season but before the start of the playoffs, Saint Mary's was forced to forfeit all of its games due to using an ineligible player. Saint Mary's dropped from 4th to 9th while other schools' records were adjusted accordingly.

Semifinals
1	New Brunswick	4	5	8
4	Acadia	5	1	2
2	Moncton	3	3	-
3	Prince Edward Island	2	2	-

Championship
1	New Brunswick	3	8	-
2	Moncton	1	3	-

Note: * denotes overtime period(s)

=== 1985 ===
Seed	School	Standings	Seed	School	Standings
1	Prince Edward Island	20–4–0	6	New Brunswick	10–14–0
2	Moncton	19–4–1	7	Mount Allison	7–16–1
3	Acadia	14–8–2	8	Saint Mary's	7–17–0
4	Dalhousie	13–9–2	9	St. Thomas	4–19–1
5	St. Francis Xavier	10–13–1			

Semifinals
1	Prince Edward Island	4	4	-
4	Dalhousie	3	3	-
2	Moncton	4	4	9
3	Acadia	5	3	3

Championship
1	Prince Edward Island	5	2*	-
2	Moncton	4	1	-

Note: * denotes overtime period(s)

=== 1986 ===
Kelly			MacAdam		
Seed	School	Standings	Seed	School	Standings
1	Dalhousie	18–7–0	1	Moncton	20–4–0
2	St. Francis Xavier	16–9–0	2	Prince Edward Island	19–5–0
3	Acadia	10–15–0	3	St. Thomas	14–10–0
4	Saint Mary's	0–25–0	4	New Brunswick	9–15–0
			5	Mount Allison	4–20–0

Semifinals
K1	Dalhousie	5	6	5
M2	Prince Edward Island	8	5	3
M1	Moncton	8	8	-
K2	St. Francis Xavier	2	4	-

Championship
K1	Dalhousie	6	7	4
M1	Moncton	2	9	9

Note: * denotes overtime period(s)

=== 1987 ===
Kelly			MacAdam		
Seed	School	Standings	Seed	School	Standings
1	Dalhousie	19–6–0	1	Moncton	20–4–0
2	St. Francis Xavier	15–10–0	2	Prince Edward Island	20–4–0
3	Acadia	11–14–0	3	New Brunswick	8–16–0
4	Saint Mary's	7–18–0	4	St. Thomas	7–17–0
			5	Mount Allison	3–21–0

Semifinals
K1	Dalhousie	3	2	-
M2	Prince Edward Island	4**	4	-
M1	Moncton	3	4	4
K2	St. Francis Xavier	4**	2	5*

Championship
M2	Prince Edward Island	3	4	-
K2	St. Francis Xavier	1	2	-

Note: * denotes overtime period(s)

=== 1988 ===
Kelly			MacAdam		
Seed	School	Standings	Seed	School	Standings
1	St. Francis Xavier	18–6–2	1	Prince Edward Island	22–2–2
2	Acadia	18–6–2	2	Moncton	17–9–0
3	Dalhousie	17–9–0	3	St. Thomas	6–20–0
4	Cape Breton	12–14–0	4	Mount Allison	5–20–1
5	Saint Mary's	7–17–0	5	New Brunswick	3–22–1

Semifinals
K1	St. Francis Xavier	1	4	2
M2	Moncton	4	1	3**
M1	Prince Edward Island	?	6	5
K2	Acadia	?	3	2

Championship
M2	Moncton	2	0	-
M1	Prince Edward Island	3*	5	-

Note: * denotes overtime period(s)

=== 1989 ===
Kelly			MacAdam		
Seed	School	Standings	Seed	School	Standings
1	Acadia	17–8–1	1	Moncton	23–3–0
2	Saint Mary's	17–8–1	2	St. Thomas	17–9–0
3	Dalhousie	13–13–0	3	Prince Edward Island	17–9–0
4	Cape Breton	9–17–0	4	Mount Allison	6–19–1
5	St. Francis Xavier	4–22–0	5	New Brunswick	5–20–1

Quarterfinals
K1	Acadia	1	3	5
K4	Cape Breton	3	2	3
M2	St. Thomas	4	5	5
M3	Prince Edward Island	6	3	3
M1	Moncton	6	12	-
M4	Mount Allison	3	1	-
K2	Saint Mary’s	4	1	-
K3	Dalhousie	8	4	-

Semifinals
K1	Acadia	3**	4	3
M2	St. Thomas	2	5	4*
M1	Moncton	5	5	8
K3	Dalhousie	4	6	0

Championship
M2	St. Thomas	2	4	-
M1	Moncton	6	8	-

Note: * denotes overtime period(s)

=== 1990 ===
Kelly			MacAdam		
Seed	School	Standings	Seed	School	Standings
1	Acadia	16–5–0	1	Moncton	16–5–0
2	Dalhousie	10–9–2	2	Prince Edward Island	13–8–0
3	St. Francis Xavier	9–11–2	3	New Brunswick	11–9–1
4	Cape Breton	7–14–0	4	St. Thomas	10–11–0
5	Saint Mary's	5–15–2	5	Mount Allison	5–16–0

Quarterfinals
K1	Acadia	3	9	6
K4	Cape Breton	6	3	3
M2	Prince Edward Island	1	6	8
M3	New Brunswick	3	3	2
M1	Moncton	7	2	6
M4	St. Thomas	3	7	3
K2	Dalhousie	6	7	-
K3	St. Francis Xavier	5	3	-

Semifinals
K1	Acadia	4	3	-
M2	Prince Edward Island	7	8	-
M1	Moncton	5	7	-
K2	Dalhousie	4	0	-

Championship
M2	Prince Edward Island	2	2	-
M1	Moncton	3	6	-

Note: * denotes overtime period(s)

=== 1991 ===
Kelly			MacAdam		
Seed	School	Standings	Seed	School	Standings
1	Dalhousie	16–5–5	1	Prince Edward Island	14–11–1
2	Cape Breton	14–12–0	2	Moncton	11–9–6
3	Acadia	12–12–2	3	New Brunswick	12–11–3
4	St. Francis Xavier	10–12–4	4	St. Thomas	10–14–2
5	Saint Mary's	9–16–1	5	Mount Allison	8–14–4

Quarterfinals
1	Dalhousie	6	3	1
4	St. Francis Xavier	4	4	0
Kelly Division
2	Cape Breton	10	6	-
3	Acadia	5	2	-
1	Prince Edward Island	8	4	-
4	St. Thomas	1	3	-
MacAdam Division
2	Moncton	2	5	1****
3	New Brunswick	6	4	0

Semifinals
1	Dalhousie	4	8	-
2	Cape Breton	1	3	-
1	Prince Edward Island	2	8	8
2	Moncton	6	5	4

Championship
K1	Dalhousie	1	7	0
M1	Prince Edward Island	3	4	3

The third game for the quarterfinal round was a mini-game that was used only to determine which team advanced.
Note: * denotes overtime period(s)

=== 1992 ===
Kelly			MacAdam		
Seed	School	Standings	Seed	School	Standings
1	Acadia	18–4–2	1	New Brunswick	18–7–1
2	Dalhousie	13–8–4	2	Prince Edward Island	13–9–2
3	Saint Mary's	9–13–4	3	St. Thomas	11–14–1
4	St. Francis Xavier	9–14–3	4	Moncton	9–14–2
5	Cape Breton	7–15–4	5	Mount Allison	7–16–1

Quarterfinals
1	Acadia	7	6	-
4	St. Francis Xavier	0	2	-
Kelly Division
2	Dalhousie	5	6	9
3	Saint Mary’s	6	1	1
1	New Brunswick	4	3	-
4	Moncton	2	2	-
MacAdam Division
2	Prince Edward Island	5	3	-
3	St. Thomas	3	2	-

Semifinals
1	Acadia	3	5	6
2	Dalhousie	5	4	3
1	New Brunswick	5	3	-
2	Prince Edward Island	6	4	-

Championship
K1	Acadia	12	4	-
M2	Prince Edward Island	1	3	-

Note: * denotes overtime period(s)

=== 1993 ===
Kelly			MacAdam		
Seed	School	Standings	Seed	School	Standings
1	Acadia	22–2–2	1	New Brunswick	18–7–1
2	Dalhousie	17–8–1	2	Moncton	13–12–1
3	Saint Mary's	12–13–1	3	St. Thomas	11–13–2
4	Cape Breton	10–15–1	4	Prince Edward Island	7–15–4
5	St. Francis Xavier	7–19–0	5	Mount Allison	6–19–1

Quarterfinals
1	Acadia	2	9	14
4	Cape Breton	3*	2	2
Kelly Division
2	Dalhousie	5	5	-
3	Saint Mary’s	3	4	-
1	New Brunswick	8	4	-
4	Prince Edward Island	0	3	-
MacAdam Division
2	Moncton	2	7	6
3	St. Thomas	4	4	4

Semifinals
1	Acadia	6	4	-
2	Dalhousie	2	0	-
1	New Brunswick	9	5*	-
2	Moncton	7	4	-

Championship
K1	Acadia	3	6	-
M1	New Brunswick	1	0	-

Note: * denotes overtime period(s)

=== 1994 ===
Kelly			MacAdam		
Seed	School	Standings	Seed	School	Standings
1	Dalhousie	19–3–4	1	New Brunswick	16–9–1
2	Acadia	19–4–3	2	St. Thomas	14–11–1
3	St. Francis Xavier	13–11–2	3	Moncton	10–11–5
4	Saint Mary's	12–11–3	4	Prince Edward Island	5–16–5
5	Cape Breton	5–18–3	5	Mount Allison	2–21–3

Quarterfinals
1	Dalhousie	5	5	-
4	Saint Mary’s	4	1	-
Kelly Division
2	Acadia	7	5	-
3	St. Francis Xavier	3	1	-
1	New Brunswick	3	6	-
4	Prince Edward Island	1	0	-
MacAdam Division
2	St. Thomas	1	2	4
3	Moncton	2	1	5

Semifinals
1	Dalhousie	2	3	-
2	Acadia	12	9	-
1	New Brunswick	4	4*	8
3	Moncton	5	3	4

Championship
K2	Acadia	5	7	-
M1	New Brunswick	3	3	-

Note: * denotes overtime period(s)

=== 1995 ===
Kelly			MacAdam		
Seed	School	Standings	Seed	School	Standings
1	Acadia	22–1–3	1	New Brunswick	18–4–4
2	Dalhousie	18–7–1	2	Moncton	15–7–4
3	Saint Mary's	10–15–1	3	Prince Edward Island	13–11–2
4	St. Francis Xavier	9–16–1	4	St. Thomas	11–12–3
5	Cape Breton	1–24–1	5	Mount Allison	2–22–2

Quarterfinals
1	Acadia	8	7	-
4	St. Francis Xavier	2	0	-
Kelly Division
2	Dalhousie	8	11	-
3	Saint Mary’s	1	3	-
1	New Brunswick	3	4	3
4	St. Thomas	4	2	9
MacAdam Division
2	Moncton	4	6	-
3	Prince Edward Island	2	5	-

Semifinals
1	Acadia	3	7	4
2	Dalhousie	6	3	1
4	St. Thomas	2	4	-
2	Moncton	3	7	-

Championship
K1	Acadia	4	3	-
M2	Moncton	5	4	-

Note: * denotes overtime period(s)

=== 1996 ===
Kelly			MacAdam		
Seed	School	Standings	Seed	School	Standings
1	Acadia	19–6–1	1	St. Thomas	19–6–1
2	St. Francis Xavier	15–11–0	2	New Brunswick	15–10–1
3	Dalhousie	12–12–2	3	Prince Edward Island	15–10–1
4	Saint Mary's	10–15–1	4	Moncton	13–11–2
5	Cape Breton	2–23–1	5	Mount Allison	5–21–2

Quarterfinals
1	Acadia	3	10	-
4	Saint Mary’s	2	2	-
Kelly Division
2	St. Francis Xavier	1	3	-
3	Dalhousie	2	4	-
1	St. Thomas	2	7	1
4	Moncton	3	3	5
MacAdam Division
2	New Brunswick	1	9	0
3	Prince Edward Island	8	5	1

Semifinals
1	Acadia	7	2	3
3	Dalhousie	3	5	2
4	Moncton	6	2	-
3	Prince Edward Island	8	3	-

Championship
K1	Acadia	7	3	7
M3	Prince Edward Island	6	4	6

Note: * denotes overtime period(s)

=== 1997 ===
Kelly			MacAdam		
Seed	School	Standings	Seed	School	Standings
1	Acadia	21–6–1	1	New Brunswick	19–8–1
2	St. Francis Xavier	18–8–2	2	St. Thomas	14–11–3
3	Dalhousie	13–11–4	3	Prince Edward Island	12–14–2
4	Saint Mary's	5–20–3	4	Moncton	11–15–2
			5	Mount Allison	2–22–4

Quarterfinals
1	Acadia	7	9	-
4	Saint Mary’s	2	5	-
Kelly Division
2	St. Francis Xavier	3	5	4
3	Dalhousie	8	0	5
1	New Brunswick	7	7	-
4	Moncton	1	1	-
MacAdam Division
2	St. Thomas	7	7	-
3	Prince Edward Island	4	3	-

Semifinals
1	Acadia	4	5	-
3	Dalhousie	3	4	-
1	New Brunswick	8	4	-
2	St. Thomas	5	3	-

Championship
K1	Acadia	4	4	-
M1	New Brunswick	5	5	-

Note: * denotes overtime period(s)

=== 1998 ===
Kelly			MacAdam		
Seed	School	Standings	Seed	School	Standings
1	St. Francis Xavier	18–8–2–1	1	New Brunswick	24–3–1–0
2	Acadia	17–10–1–0	2	St. Thomas	14–11–3–1
3	Dalhousie	11–16–1–0	3	Moncton	11–14–3–0
4	Saint Mary's	8–16–4–1	4	Prince Edward Island	11–16–1–2
			5	Mount Allison	3–23–2–0

Quarterfinals
1	St. Francis Xavier	2	7	4
4	Saint Mary’s	3	5	2
Kelly Division
2	Acadia	4	2	-
3	Dalhousie	2	1	-
1	New Brunswick	9	2	5
4	Prince Edward Island	4	4	4
MacAdam Division
2	St. Thomas	7	7	-
3	Moncton	4	3	-

Semifinals
1	St. Francis Xavier	1	2	-
2	Acadia	3	9	-
1	New Brunswick	4	5	-
2	St. Thomas	2	4	-

Championship
K2	Acadia	2	2	2
M1	New Brunswick	1	3	3

Note: * denotes overtime period(s)

== Championships ==
School	Championships
Moncton	8
Saint Mary's	8
Acadia	4
Prince Edward Island	4
New Brunswick	3
St. Francis Xavier	2
Dalhousie	1

== See also ==
- MIAA men's ice hockey tournament
- AUS men's ice hockey tournament
