= Antigonish (disambiguation) =

Antigonish may refer to:

== Places ==
- Antigonish, Nova Scotia, a town in Nova Scotia, Canada
- Municipality of the County of Antigonish, an incorporated county municipality in Nova Scotia, Canada
- Antigonish (federal electoral district)
- Antigonish (provincial electoral district), in Nova Scotia, Canada

== Other uses ==
- "Antigonish" (poem), 1899 poem by Hughes Mearns, also known as "The Little Man Who Wasn't There"
- Antigonish Arena, in Nova Scotia, Canada
- Antigonish Movement
- Diocese of Antigonish, in the Roman Catholic Church
- HMCS Antigonish, a River-class frigate and Prestonian-class frigate
