= St. Thomas Tommies men's ice hockey =

St. Thomas Tommies men's ice hockey may refer to:

- St. Thomas (Minnesota) Tommies men's ice hockey, the team from the University of St. Thomas, St. Paul–Minneapolis, Minnesota, US
- St. Thomas (New Brunswick) Tommies men's ice hockey, the team from St. Thomas University, Fredericton, New Brunswick
