= Mount Allison Mounties men's ice hockey =

- University: Mount Allison University
- Conference: AUS
- First season: 1896 (disestablished 1998)
- Arena: Sackville, New Brunswick
- Colors: garnet and gold

Conference tournament champions
- 1931, 1932, 1933, 1935, 1938, 1939

The Mount Allison Mounties men's ice hockey team was an ice hockey team representing the Mount Allison Mounties athletics program of Mount Allison University. The team was active from 1896 through 1998 before being dropped as a varsity sport.

== History ==
In January 1896, Copp's Rink opened in Sackville, allowing ice hockey to come to Mount Allison for the first time. Prior to that, no athletic programs were active at the school during the winter months and, coincidentally, ice hockey swiftly became a favorite of the student body, The first intercollegiate game was played against Dalhousie in February of the following year and every winter the students looked forward to the start of the season. The faculty, on the other hand, were not fans. After the team had joined its first conference in 1905, the administrators felt that too much time was being devoted to the sport and decided to ban ice hockey in favor of basketball. A little over a month later, the university presidents of Acadia (who had also banned hockey) and Mount Allison learned that students from their respective campuses had taken it upon themselves to organize teams and play local teams despite the ban. With the schools powerless to stop the students, the ban was lifted and hockey resumed the following year.

Upon their return, the Mounties welcomed the program's first head coach, Jack Twaddle. The team went on to win a pair of championships in 1914 with one being attended by over 1,000 spectators. World War I put the team on ice for a few years but the interest in the game seemed to have remained once Mount Allison returned in 1920. The team competed in both senior and intercollegiate leagues throughout the 20s and 30s and were one of the top teams in the Maritimes, winning 6 championships in a 9-year stretch.

World War II forced the team to stop playing for a time but they returned as soon as the fighting was over. After the war, Mount Allison sought to keep its spot as the best team of the region but they eventually found themselves slipping down the standings. After switching to a college-only schedule in 1955, Mount Allison was still able to compete against the top teams but by the beginning of the 1960s they found themselves at the bottom of the standings. The program experienced a revival in the early 80s, winning two division titles, but that success was short-lived. The Mounties last appearance in the postseason was 1983 and, even after expanding to eight teams, Mount Allison failed to reach the playoffs by finishing last every year after 1989. After nearly a decade of abject futility, the school had had enough. In 1998, citing a need to reallocate funds to other programs as well as gender equality necessities, University President Ian Newbould terminated the ice hockey program.

== Season-by-season results ==
=== Senior and collegiate play ===
Note: GP = Games played, W = Wins, L = Losses, T = Ties, Pts = Points

U Sports Champion	U Sports Semifinalist	Conference regular season champions	Conference Division Champions	Conference Playoff Champions

Season	Conference	Regular Season											Conference Tournament Results	National Tournament Results
Season	Conference	Conference						Overall					Conference Tournament Results	National Tournament Results
Season	Conference	GP	W	L	T	Pts*	Finish	GP	W	L	T	%	Conference Tournament Results	National Tournament Results
Senior Hockey
1895–96	Independent	–	–	–	–	–	–	?	?	?	?	?		
1896–97	Independent	–	–	–	–	–	–	?	?	?	?	?		
1897–98	Independent	–	–	–	–	–	–	?	?	?	?	?		
1898–99	Independent	–	–	–	–	–	–	?	?	?	?	?		
1899–00	Independent	–	–	–	–	–	–	?	?	?	?	?		
1900–01	Independent	–	–	–	–	–	–	?	?	?	?	?		
1901–02	Independent	–	–	–	–	–	–	?	?	?	?	?		
1902–03	Independent	–	–	–	–	–	–	?	?	?	?	?		
1903–04	Independent	–	–	–	–	–	–	?	?	?	?	?		
1904–05	Independent	–	–	–	–	–	–	?	?	?	?	?		
Senior and Intercollegiate Hockey
1905–06	MIHL	2	1	1	0	2	T–3rd	?	?	?	?	?		
1906–07	MIHL	?	?	?	?	?	?	?	?	?	?	?		
1907–08	MIHL	?	?	?	?	?	?	?	?	?	?	?		
1908–09	MIHL	?	?	?	?	?	?	?	?	?	?	?		
1909–10	MIHL	?	?	?	?	?	?	?	?	?	?	?		
1910–11	MIHL	?	?	?	?	?	?	?	?	?	?	?		
Program suspended
1912–13	MIHL	?	?	?	?	?	?	?	?	?	?	?		
1913–14	MIHL	?	?	?	?	?	?	?	?	?	?	?	Won Sumner Cup	
1914–15	MIHL	?	?	?	?	?	?	?	?	?	?	?	Won Sumner Cup	
Program suspended due to World War I
1919–20	MIAA	?	?	?	?	?	2nd	?	?	?	?	?		
1920–21	MIAA	2	0	2	0	0	?	?	?	?	?	?		
1921–22	MIAA	?	?	?	?	?	?	?	?	?	?	?	Won Quarterfinal, 0–3 (New Brunswick); Won Semifinal, 3–6 (King's); Lost Championship, 3–6 (Dalhousie)	
1922–23	MIAA	2	1	1	0	2	T–3rd	?	?	?	?	?		
1923–24	MIAA	2	0	2	0	0	?	?	?	?	?	?		
1924–25	MIAA	2	1	0	1	3	?	?	?	?	?	?		
1925–26	MIAA	2	1	1	0	2	?	?	?	?	?	?		
1926–27	MIAA	2	2	0	0	4	1st	?	?	?	?	?	Lost Championship, 0–1 (St. Francis Xavier)	
1927–28	MIAA	2	1	1	0	2	?	?	?	?	?	?		
1928–29	MIAA	2	0	2	0	0	?	?	?	?	?	?		
1929–30	MIAA	?	?	?	?	?	?	?	?	?	?	?	Lost Semifinal series, 2–3 (New Brunswick)	
1930–31	MIAA	?	?	?	?	?	?	?	?	?	?	?	Won Semifinal series, 7–3 (New Brunswick); Won Championship, 0–1 (St. Francis Xavier)	
1931–32	MIAA	?	?	?	?	?	?	?	?	?	?	?	Won Semifinal series, 6–3 (New Brunswick); Won Championship, 0–3 (St. Francis Xavier)	
1932–33	MIAA	?	?	?	?	?	?	?	?	?	?	?	Won Semifinal series, 4–1 (New Brunswick); Won Championship, forfeit (Saint Mary's)	
1933–34	MIAA	4	1	1	2	4	?	?	?	?	?	?		
1934–35	MIAA	4	3	0	1	7	1st	?	?	?	?	?	Won Championship, 3–2 (St. Francis Xavier)	
1935–36	MIAA	4	0	3	1	1	4th	?	?	?	?	?		
1936–37	MIAA	4	3	0	1	7	1st	?	?	?	?	?	Lost Championship, 2–6 (St. Francis Xavier)	
1937–38	MIAA	4	4	0	0	8	1st	?	?	?	?	?	Won Championship, 4–3 (Acadia)	
1938–39	MIAA	6	5	1	0	10	1st	?	?	?	?	?	Won Championship, 4–0 (Acadia)	
1939–40	MIAA	6	3	2	1	7	?	?	?	?	?	?		
Program suspended due to World War II
1945–46	MIAA	0	0	0	0	–	–	?	?	?	?	?	Lost Quarterfinal series, 5–12 (New Brunswick)	
1946–47	MIAA	0	0	0	0	–	–	?	?	?	?	?	Lost Quarterfinal series, 10–18 (Saint Dunstan's)	
1947–48	MIAA	4	2	2	0	.500	4th	?	?	?	?	?		
Program suspended
1949–50	MIAA	4	1	3	0	.250	5th	?	?	?	?	?		
1950–51	MIAA	0	0	0	0	–	–	?	?	?	?	?	Lost Quarterfinal series, 2–11 (New Brunswick)	
1951–52	MIAA	0	0	0	0	–	–	?	?	?	?	?	Lost Quarterfinal series, 3–5 (New Brunswick)	
1952–53	MIAA	0	0	0	0	–	–	?	?	?	?	?	Won Quarterfinal series, 13–7 (Saint Dunstan's); Won Semifinal series, 13–5 (St. Thomas); Cancelled Championship series, no contest (St. Francis Xavier)	
1953–54	MIAA	0	0	0	0	–	–	?	?	?	?	?	Won Quarterfinal series, 12–2 (Saint Dunstan's); Won Semifinal series, 15–1 (New Brunswick); Lost Championship series, 3–6 (St. Francis Xavier)	
Totals								GP	W	L	T	%	Championships	
Regular Season								?	?	?	?	?	8 MIAA Division Championships, 5 MIAA Championships	
Conference Post-season								?	?	?	?	?	2 Sumner Cups, 6 MIAA Championships	
Regular Season and Postseason Record								?	?	?	?	?		

=== Collegiate only ===
Note: GP = Games played, W = Wins, L = Losses, T = Ties, OTL = Overtime Losses, SOL = Shootout Losses, Pts = Points

U Sports Champion	U Sports Semifinalist	Conference regular season champions	Conference Division Champions	Conference Playoff Champions

Season	Conference	Regular Season													Conference Tournament Results	National Tournament Results
Season	Conference	Conference								Overall					Conference Tournament Results	National Tournament Results
Season	Conference	GP	W	L	T	OTL	SOL	Pts*	Finish	GP	W	L	T	%	Conference Tournament Results	National Tournament Results
1954–55	MIAA	6	6	0	0	–	–	12	1st	8	6	2	0	.750	Lost Championship series, 1–17 (St. Francis Xavier)	
1955–56	MIAA	6	4	2	0	–	–	8	T–3rd	8	4	4	0	.500	Lost Championship series, 2–8 (St. Francis Xavier)	
1956–57	MIAA	6	2	3	1	–	–	5	5th	6	2	3	1	.417		
1957–58	MIAA	4	3	1	0	–	–	6	T–2nd	6	4	2	0	.667	Lost Semifinal series, 7–8 (New Brunswick)	
1958–59	MIAA	6	3	3	0	–	–	6	5th	8	3	5	0	.375	Lost Semifinal series, 5–16 (St. Thomas)	
1959–60	MIAA	6	2	4	0	–	–	4	7th	6	2	4	0	.333		
1960–61	MIAA	6	6	0	0	–	–	12	1st	8	6	1	1	.813	Lost Semifinal series, 3–4 (St. Thomas)	
1961–62	MIAA	6	1	4	1	–	–	3	7th	6	1	4	1	.250		
1962–63	MIAA	11	3	5	3	–	–	9	5th	11	3	5	3	.409		
1963–64	MIAA	11	2	8	1	–	–	5	8th	11	2	8	1	.227		
1964–65	MIAA	11	4	6	1	–	–	9	5th	11	4	6	1	.409		
1965–66	MIAA	14	9	5	0	–	–	18	4th	14	9	5	0	.643		
1966–67	MIAA	13	8	4	1	–	–	17	3rd	13	8	4	1	.654		
1967–68	MIAA	16	6	10	0	–	–	12	7th	16	6	10	0	.375		
1968–69	AIAA	18	2	16	0	–	–	4	10th	18	2	16	0	.111		
1969–70	AIAA	18	0	18	0	–	–	0	10th	18	0	18	0	.000		
1970–71	AIAA	18	5	13	0	–	–	10	T–7th	18	5	13	0	.278		
1971–72	AIAA	18	5	12	1	–	–	11	T–9th	18	5	12	1	.306		
1972–73	AIAA	20	10	8	2	–	–	.550	5th	20	10	8	2	.550		
1973–74	AUAA	20	10	9	1	–	–	.525	6th	20	10	9	1	.525	Lost Semifinal, 0–7 (Saint Mary's)	
1974–75	AUAA	18	4	14	0	–	–	8	9th	18	4	14	0	.222		
1975–76	AUAA	16	12	4	0	–	–	24	T–2nd	17	12	5	0	.706	Lost Semifinal, 4–9 (St. Francis Xavier)	
1976–77	AUAA	20	7	13	0	–	–	14	5th	20	7	13	0	.350		
1977–78	AUAA	20	6	13	1	–	–	13	6th	20	6	13	1	.325		
1978–79	AUAA	20	7	12	1	–	–	15	7th	20	7	12	1	.375		
1979–80	AUAA	27	14	13	0	–	–	28	6th	28	14	14	0	.500	Lost Quarterfinal, 0–4 (Saint Mary's)	
1980–81	AUAA	21	13	4	4	–	–	30	2nd	22	13	5	4	.682	Lost Semifinal, 3–5 (Dalhousie)	
1981–82	AUAA	26	17	9	0	–	–	34	3rd	28	18	10	0	.643	Lost Pool 2 Round-Robin, 3–7 (Moncton), 4–3 (Saint Mary's)	
1982–83	AUAA	24	12	10	2	–	–	26	3rd	27	13	12	2	.519	Lost Semifinal series, 1–2 (Dalhousie)	
1983–84	AUAA	24	10	14	0	–	–	20	6th	24	10	14	0	.417		
1984–85	AUAA	24	7	16	1	–	–	15	7th	24	7	16	1	.313		
1985–86	AUAA	24	4	20	0	–	–	.167	8th	24	4	20	0	.167		
1986–87	AUAA	24	3	21	0	–	–	.125	9th	24	3	21	0	.125		
1987–88	AUAA	26	5	20	1	–	–	11	9th	26	5	20	1	.212		
1988–89	AUAA	26	6	19	1	–	–	13	8th	26	6	19	1	.250		
1989–90	AUAA	21	5	16	0	–	–	10	10th	21	5	16	0	.238		
1990–91	AUAA	26	8	14	4	–	–	20	9th	26	8	14	4	.385		
1991–92	AUAA	24	7	16	1	–	–	15	10th	24	7	16	1	.313		
1992–93	AUAA	26	6	19	1	–	–	13	10th	26	6	19	1	.250		
1993–94	AUAA	26	2	21	3	–	–	7	10th	26	2	21	3	.135		
1994–95	AUAA	26	2	22	2	–	–	6	10th	26	2	22	2	.115		
1995–96	AUAA	28	5	21	2	–	–	12	9th	28	5	21	2	.214		
1996–97	AUAA	28	2	22	4	–	–	8	9th	28	2	22	4	.143		
1997–98	AUAA	28	3	23	2	0	–	8	9th	28	3	23	2	.143		
Totals										GP	W	L	T/SOL	%	Championships	
Regular Season										807	258	507	42	.346	4 West Division Titles, 2 MacAdam Division Titles, 2 MIAA Championships	
Conference Post-season										18	3	14	1	.194		
U Sports Postseason										0	0	0	0	–		
Regular Season and Postseason Record										825	261	521	43	.342		

Note: Totals include results from 1954–55 onward.

== See also ==
Mount Allison Mounties women's ice hockey
