= UNB Reds men's ice hockey =

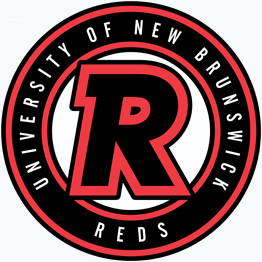
- University: University of New Brunswick
- Conference: AUS
- Head coach: Rob Hennigar
- Arena: Aitken University Centre; Fredericton, New Brunswick
- Colors: Red and Black
- Fight song: "Hail Varsity"

U Sports tournament champions
- 1998, 2007, 2009, 2011, 2013, 2016, 2017, 2019, 2023, 2024

U Sports tournament appearances
- 1964, 1984, 1997, 1998, 2000, 2003, 2004, 2007, 2008, 2009, 2011, 2012, 2013, 2015, 2016, 2017, 2018, 2019, 2020, 2022, 2023, 2024, 2025, 2026

Conference tournament champions
- 1909, 1911, 1925, 1934, 1960, 1962, 1984, 1997, 1998, 2000, 2003, 2008, 2011, 2012, 2013, 2015, 2018, 2019, 2020, 2022, 2023, 2024, 2025, 2026

The UNB Reds men's ice hockey team is a collegiate ice hockey team representing the UNB Reds athletics program of University of New Brunswick. The team is a member of the Atlantic University Sport (AUS) conference and compete in U Sports. The team plays their home games at the Aitken University Centre in Fredericton, New Brunswick.

== History ==
Students at UNB have been associated with ice hockey as far back as 1880. The first organized game occurred in 1897 when an informal team played against a Canadian Army Company. A second team wasn't organized for another 5 years but, once the Reds hockey team reappeared, the school recognized the club as official representatives of the university.

By 1905 enough other schools had picked up the game for New Brunswick to help found the Maritime Intercollegiate Hockey League (MIHL). However, just three years later, the league was rocked by allegations of St. Francis Xavier knowingly using what some felt were ineligible players (there was no governing body of the sport at the time). UNB, along with Acadia and Mount Allison, withdrew from the league and formed their own rival circuit, the Maritime Inter-provincial Intercollegiate Hockey League (MIIHL). The leagues would remain separate until after World War I but the three rogue teams would continue to award a trophy until its retirement in 1928.

During its first 50 years of existence, the UNB Reds played in both collegiate and senior levels of hockey, often at the same time. It wasn't until the late-50's that the team played exclusively at the college level. The then-renamed Red Devils had success in the early 60s and appeared in the second iteration of the University Cup in 1964. After Pete Kelly's retirement in 1966, the team flagged and saw middling results for most of the next 25 years. UNB didn't really recover until the arrival of Mike Johnston in 1989 and he soon had the team back at the top of the conference. UNB won four consecutive Division titles in the mid-90s but they weren't able to parlay that success into a national tournament appearance. After Johnston's departure, the team continued to perform well, finally winning a conference championship in 1997 and then achieved their ultimate goal of a national title the following year.

In 2000, Gardiner MacDougall was named head coach and would go on to lead the team to an unparalleled level of success. Over the next 23 seasons, the Reds would win 9 national championships, 12 conference championship and capture 16 consecutive (and counting) league titles. In May 2024, MacDougall stepped down to assume coaching duties for the Moncton Wildcats of the Quebec Maritimes Junior Hockey League (QMJHL).

=== Moniker ===
Originally the school's athletic teams were referred to as simply "UNB", however, they were also called "Red and Black" or "The Hillmen" from time to time. In January of 1958, the student newspaper began to assign specific names to each of the school's varsity programs. They began referring to the ice hockey team as "Red Devils". While the fans would accept this change, the school ignored the nickname until the 80s when the name began to appear on team jackets. Unhappy with having a different name for each of its programs, the university decided to have one brand for the athletic department. In 1991, the school selected 4 possible names and allowed students and alumni to vote for the new name. The final result was overwhelming with "Varsity Reds" receiving 66% support. The school kept the moniker until 2018 when they rebranded as "Reds" while also changing the color scheme.

== Season-by-season results ==
=== Senior and collegiate play ===
Note: GP = Games played, W = Wins, L = Losses, T = Ties, Pts = Points

U Sports Champion	U Sports Semifinalist	Conference regular season champions	Conference Division Champions	Conference Playoff Champions

Season	Conference	Regular Season											Conference Tournament Results	National Tournament Results
Season	Conference	Conference						Overall					Conference Tournament Results	National Tournament Results
Season	Conference	GP	W	L	T	Pts*	Finish	GP	W	L	T	%	Conference Tournament Results	National Tournament Results
Senior Hockey
1902–03	Independent	–	–	–	–	–	–	?	?	?	?	?		
1903–04	Independent	–	–	–	–	–	–	?	?	?	?	?		
1904–05	Independent	–	–	–	–	–	–	?	?	?	?	?		
Senior and Intercollegiate Hockey
1905–06	MIHL	2	1	1	0	2	T–3rd	?	?	?	?	?		
1906–07	MIHL	?	?	?	?	?	?	?	?	?	?	?		
1907–08	MIHL	?	?	?	?	?	?	?	?	?	?	?		
1908–09	MIIHL	?	?	?	?	?	?	?	?	?	?	?	Won Championship	
1909–10	MIIHL	?	?	?	?	?	?	?	?	?	?	?		
Sandy Staples (1910–1911)
1910–11	MIIHL	?	?	?	?	?	?	?	?	?	?	?	Won Championship	
Program suspended
Jack MacKay (1912–1913)
1912–13	MIIHL	?	?	?	?	?	?	?	?	?	?	?		
Mike Murphy (1913–1914)
1913–14	MIIHL	?	?	?	?	?	?	?	?	?	?	?	Lost Championship	
Ewart C. Atkinson (1914–1915)
1914–15	MIIHL	?	?	?	?	?	?	?	?	?	?	?		
Program suspended due to World War I
Archie Williams (1919–1920)
1919–20	MIAA	?	?	?	?	?	?	?	?	?	?	?		
Fred McLean (1920–1925)
1920–21	MIAA	2	2	0	0	4	T–1st	?	?	?	?	?	Lost Championship, 0–3 (Dalhousie)	
1921–22	MIAA	?	?	?	?	?	?	?	?	?	?	?	Lost Quarterfinal, 0–3 (Mount Allison)	
1922–23	MIAA	2	1	1	0	2	T–2nd	?	?	?	?	?	Won Semifinal, 7–5 (King's); Lost Championship, 1–8 (Dalhousie)	
1923–24	MIAA	2	1	1	0	2	?	?	?	?	?	?		
1924–25	MIAA	2	1	0	1	3	?	?	?	?	?	?	Won Championship, 5–4 (St. Francis Xavier)	
no coach (1925–1926)
1925–26	MIAA	2	1	1	0	2	?	?	?	?	?	?	Won Semifinal, 5–2 (Acadia); Lost Championship, 2–3 (St. Francis Xavier)	
Bert Burgess (1926–1927)
1926–27	MIAA	2	1	1	0	2	?	?	?	?	?	?		
Fred McLean (1927–1929)
1927–28	MIAA	2	2	0	0	4	T–1st	?	?	?	?	?	Lost Championship, 1–3 (St. Francis Xavier)	
1928–29	MIAA	2	2	0	0	4	T–1st	?	?	?	?	?	Lost Championship series, 5–10 (St. Francis Xavier)	
W. E. Turner (1929–1930)
1929–30	MIAA	?	?	?	?	?	?	?	?	?	?	?	Won Semifinal series, 3–2 (Mount Allison); Lost Championship, 0–2 (Saint Mary's)	
Ted Coffey (1930–1932)
1930–31	MIAA	?	?	?	?	?	?	?	?	?	?	?	Lost Semifinal series, 3–7 (Mount Allison)	
1931–32	MIAA	?	?	?	?	?	?	?	?	?	?	?	Lost Semifinal series, 3–6 (Mount Allison)	
Fred McLean (1932–1936)
1932–33	MIAA	?	?	?	?	?	?	?	?	?	?	?	Lost Semifinal series, 1–4 (Mount Allison)	
1933–34	MIAA	4	2	0	2	6	1st	?	?	?	?	?	Won Championship, 3–1 (Acadia)	
1934–35	MIAA	4	1	1	2	4	?	?	?	?	?	?		
1935–36	MIAA	4	4	0	0	8	1st	?	?	?	?	?	Lost Championship, 2–3 (St. Francis Xavier)	
Bob Chalmers (1936–1937)
1936–37	MIAA	4	1	3	0	2	6th	?	?	?	?	?		
Ralph Goodine (1937–1938)
1937–38	MIAA	4	1	3	0	2	?	?	?	?	?	?		
Jack Akins (1938–1939)
1938–39	MIAA	6	4	1	1	9	?	?	?	?	?	?		
Harold Thompson (1939–1940)
1939–40	MIAA	6	2	2	2	6	?	?	?	?	?	?		
1940–41	MIAA	0	—	—	—	—	—	?	?	?	?	?	Lost Championship, 3–4 (St. Francis Xavier)	
Program suspended due to World War II
Bernie Ralston (1945–1946)
1945–46	MIAA	0	0	0	0	–	–	?	?	?	?	?	Won Quarterfinal series, 12–5 (Mount Allison); Lost Semifinal series, 4–7 (St. Joseph's)	
Pete Kelly (1946–1966)
1946–47	MIAA	0	0	0	0	–	–	?	?	?	?	?	Lost Quarterfinal series, 12–14 (St. Thomas)	
1947–48	MIAA	4	3	1	0	.750	1st	?	?	?	?	?	Lost Semifinal series, 3–10 (Saint Dunstan's)	
1948–49	MIAA	0	0	0	0	–	–	?	?	?	?	?	Won Quarterfinal series, forfeit (St. Joseph's); Won Semifinal series, 11–5 (St. Thomas); Lost Championship, 6–7 (Acadia)	
1949–50	MIAA	6	5	0	1	.917	2nd	?	?	?	?	?	Lost Championship series, 6–13 (St. Francis Xavier)	
1950–51	MIAA	0	0	0	0	–	–	?	?	?	?	?	Won Quarterfinal series, 11–2 (Mount Allison); Lost Semifinal series, 7–13 (St. Thomas)	
1951–52	MIAA	0	0	0	0	–	–	?	?	?	?	?	Won Quarterfinal series, 5–3 (Mount Allison); Won Semifinal series, 14–3 (Saint Dunstan's); Lost Championship series, 5–21 (St. Francis Xavier)	
1952–53	MIAA	0	0	0	0	–	–	?	?	?	?	?	Lost Quarterfinal series, 4–7 (St. Thomas)	
1953–54	MIAA	0	0	0	0	–	–	?	?	?	?	?	Won Quarterfinal series, 10–9 (St. Thomas); Lost Semifinal series, 1–15 (Mount Allison)	
Totals								GP	W	L	T	%	Championships	
Regular Season								?	?	?	?	?	12 MIAA Division Championships, 6 MIAA Championships	
Conference Post-season								?	?	?	?	?	4 MIAA Championships	
Regular Season and Postseason Record								?	?	?	?	?		

=== Collegiate only ===
Note: GP = Games played, W = Wins, L = Losses, T = Ties, OTL = Overtime Losses, SOL = Shootout Losses, Pts = Points

U Sports Champion	U Sports Semifinalist	Conference regular season champions	Conference Division Champions	Conference Playoff Champions

Season	Conference	Regular Season													Conference Tournament Results	National Tournament Results
Season	Conference	Conference								Overall					Conference Tournament Results	National Tournament Results
Season	Conference	GP	W	L	T	OTL	SOL	Pts*	Finish	GP	W	L	T/OTL	%	Conference Tournament Results	National Tournament Results
Pete Kelly (1946–1966)
1954–55	MIAA	6	0	5	1	–	–	1	8th	6	0	5	1	.083		
1955–56	MIAA	6	0	6	0	–	–	0	T–8th	6	0	6	0	.000		
1956–57	MIAA	6	6	0	0	–	–	12	1st	8	6	2	0	.750	Lost Championship series, 6–15 (St. Francis Xavier)	
1957–58	MIAA	4	3	1	0	–	–	6	T–2nd	8	4	3	1	.563	Won Semifinal series, 8–7 (Mount Allison); Lost Championship series, 8–10 (St. Francis Xavier)	
1958–59	MIAA	6	2	3	1	–	–	5	6th	6	2	3	1	.417		
1959–60	MIAA	6	4	2	0	–	–	8	3rd	9	7	2	0	.778	Won Semifinal series, 11–5 (St. Thomas); Won Championship series, 2–0 (St. Francis Xavier)	
1960–61	MIAA	6	3	3	0	–	–	6	T–5th	6	3	3	0	.500		
1961–62	MIAA	6	5	1	0	–	–	10	2nd	11	8	3	0	.750	Won Semifinal series, 7–6 (St. Thomas); Won Championship series, 2–1 (St. Francis Xavier)	
1962–63	MIAA	11	9	0	2	–	–	20	1st	14	10	2	2	.786	Lost Championship series, 1–2 (St. Francis Xavier)	
1963–64	MIAA	11	9	2	0	–	–	18	1st	13	10	3	0	.769		Lost Semifinal, 3–5 (Alberta); Won Third Place Game, 8–6 (Montreal)
1964–65	MIAA	11	7	3	1	–	–	15	3rd	11	7	3	1	.682		
1965–66	MIAA	14	9	4	1	–	–	19	3rd	14	9	4	1	.679		
Bill MacGillvary (1966–1970)
1966–67	MIAA	13	5	7	1	–	–	11	5th	13	5	7	1	.423		
1967–68	MIAA	16	9	7	0	–	–	18	4th	17	9	8	0	.529	Lost Semifinal, 1–2 (St. Francis Xavier)	
1968–69	AIAA	17	9	5	3	–	–	21	5th	17	9	5	3	.618		
1969–70	AIAA	18	11	5	2	–	–	24	3rd	19	11	6	2	.632	Lost Semifinal, 1–8 (St. Francis Xavier)	
Jim Morell (1970–1971)
1970–71	AIAA	18	5	13	0	–	–	10	T–7th	18	5	13	0	.278		
Bill MacGillvary (1971–1977)
1971–72	AIAA	18	7	11	0	–	–	14	7th	18	7	11	0	.389		
1972–73	AIAA	20	9	9	2	–	–	.500	6th	20	9	9	2	.500		
1973–74	AUAA	20	11	8	1	–	–	.575	4th	21	11	9	1	.548	Lost Semifinal, 0–7 (Saint Mary's)	
1974–75	AUAA	18	7	10	1	–	–	15	6th	18	7	10	1	.417		
1975–76	AUAA	16	5	11	0	–	–	10	7th	16	5	11	0	.313		
1976–77	AUAA	20	1	19	0	–	–	2	8th	20	1	19	0	.050		
Don MacAdam (1977–1985)
1977–78	AUAA	20	4	14	2	–	–	10	7th	20	4	14	2	.250		
1978–79	AUAA	20	3	16	1	–	–	7	8th	20	3	16	1	.175		
1979–80	AUAA	27	15	11	1	–	–	21	4th	28	15	12	1	.554	Lost Quarterfinal, 4–7 (St. Francis Xavier)	
1980–81	AUAA	21	10	10	1	–	–	21	5th	23	11	11	1	.500	Won Quarterfinal, 4–0 (Saint Mary's); Lost Semifinal, 5–8 (Moncton)	
1981–82	AUAA	26	16	9	1	–	–	33	T–5th	28	16	11	1	.589	Lost Pool 1 Round-Robin, 2–3 (Dalhousie), 3–9 (Prince Edward Island)	
1982–83	AUAA	24	10	14	0	–	–	20	6th	24	10	14	0	.417		
1983–84	AUAA	24	21	3	0	–	–	42	1st	30	25	5	0	.833	Won Semifinal series, 2–1 (Acadia); Won Championship series, 2–0 (Moncton)	Lost Quarterfinal series, 0–2 (Toronto)
1984–85	AUAA	24	10	14	0	–	–	20	6th	24	10	14	0	.417		
Doug MacLean (1985–1986)
1985–86	AUAA	24	9	15	0	–	–	.375	7th	24	9	15	0	.375		
Rick Nickelchok (1986–1989)
1986–87	AUAA	24	8	16	0	–	–	.333	6th	24	8	16	0	.333		
1987–88	AUAA	26	3	22	1	–	–	7	10th	26	3	22	1	.135		
Mark Jeffrey (1989)
1988–89	AUAA	26	5	20	1	–	–	11	9th	26 ^{†}	5 ^{†}	20 ^{†}	1 ^{†}	.212		
Mike Johnston (1989–1994)
1989–90	AUAA	21	11	9	1	–	–	23	4th	24	12	11	1	.521	Lost Quarterfinal series, 1–2 (Prince Edward Island)	
1990–91	AUAA	26	12	11	3	–	–	27	5th	29	13	13	3	.500	Lost Division Semifinal series, 1–2 (Moncton)	
1991–92	AUAA	26	18	7	1	–	–	37	2nd	30	20	9	1	.683	Won Quarterfinal series, 2–0 (Moncton); Lost Semifinal series, 0–2 (Prince Edward Island)	
1992–93	AUAA	26	18	7	1	–	–	37	2nd	32	22	9	1	.703	Won Quarterfinal series, 2–0 (Prince Edward Island); Won Semifinal series, 2–0 (Moncton); Lost Championship series, 0–2 (Acadia)	
1993–94	AUAA	26	16	9	1	–	–	37	3rd	33	20	12	1	.621	Won Quarterfinal series, 2–0 (Prince Edward Island); Won Semifinal series, 2–1 (Moncton); Lost Championship series, 0–2 (Acadia)	
Danny Grant (1994–1996)
1994–95	AUAA	26	18	4	4	–	–	40	2nd	29	19	6	4	.724	Lost Quarterfinal series, 1–2 (St. Thomas)	
1995–96	AUAA	26	15	10	1	–	–	31	T–3rd	29	16	12	1	.569	Lost Quarterfinal series, 1–2 (Prince Edward Island)	
Mike Kelly (1996–1998)
1996–97	AUAA	28	19	8	1	–	–	39	2nd	36	26	9	1	.736	Won Quarterfinal series, 2–0 (Moncton); Won Semifinal series, 2–0 (St. Thomas); Won Championship series, 2–0 (Acadia)	Won Semifinal, 4–3 (Alberta); Lost Championship, 2–4 (Guelph)
1997–98	AUAA	28	24	3	1	0	–	49	1st	39	33	5	1	.859	Won Quarterfinal series, 2–1 (Prince Edward Island); Won Semifinal series, 2–0 (St. Thomas); Won Championship series, 2–1 (Acadia)	Won Pool A Round-Robin, 3–2 (Windsor), 5–2 (Alberta); Won Championship, 6–3 (Acadia)
Tom Coolen (1998–2000)
1998–99	AUS	26	13	12	1	1	–	28	5th	29	14	14	1	.500	Lost Quarterfinal series, 1–2 (Moncton)	
1999–00	AUS	26	15	11	0	0	–	30	4th	37	24	13	0	.649	Won Quarterfinal series, 2–0 (Moncton); Won Semifinal series, 2–1 (St. Thomas); Won Championship series, 3–1 (Acadia)	Won Pool A Round-Robin, 3–2 (Western Ontario), 5–4 (Saskatchewan); Lost Championship, 4–5 (Alberta)
Gardiner MacDougall (2000–2024)
2000–01	AUS	28	13	10	5	0	–	31	4th	34	16	13	5	.544	Won Quarterfinal series, 2–1 (Acadia); Lost Semifinal series, 1–2 (St. Francis Xavier)	
2001–02	AUS	28	14	10	4	0	–	32	4th	32	16	12	4	.563	Won Quarterfinal series, 2–0 (Prince Edward Island); Lost Semifinal series, 0–2 (Dalhousie)	
2002–03	AUS	28	15	12	1	0	–	31	4th	40	23	16	1	.588	Won Quarterfinal series, 2–0 (Saint Mary's); Won Semifinal series, 2–1 (St. Thomas); Won Championship series, 3–1 (St. Francis Xavier)	Lost Pool B Round-Robin, 4–3 (Lakehead), 3–4 (Quebec–Trois-Rivières); Lost Third Place Game, 2–8 (Alberta)
2003–04	AUS	28	16	5	3	4	–	39	2nd	33	18	12	3	.591	Lost Semifinal series, 0–2 (Dalhousie)	Won Pool A Round-Robin, 5–2 (Ottawa), 6–5 (OT) (Alberta); Lost Championship, 1–4 (St. Francis Xavier)
2004–05	AUS	28	15	11	1	1	–	32	T–3rd	32	17	14	1	.547	Won Quarterfinal series, 2–0 (St. Francis Xavier); Lost Semifinal series, 0–2 (Acadia)	
2005–06	AUS	28	15	8	4	1	–	34	3rd	36	19	13	4	.583	Won Quarterfinal series, 2–1 (St. Francis Xavier); Won Semifinal series, 2–0 (Moncton); Lost Championship series, 0–3 (Acadia)	
2006–07	AUS	28	18	7	–	3	–	39	2nd	37	24	13	0	.649	Won Semifinal series, 3–1 (St. Francis Xavier); Lost Championship series, 0–2 (Moncton)	Won Pool B Round-Robin, 2–1 (Saskatchewan), 6–0 (Quebec–Trois-Rivières); Won Championship, 3–2 (Moncton)
2007–08	AUS	28	26	1	–	1	–	53	1st	36	33	3	0	.917	Won Semifinal series, 3–0 (St. Thomas); Won Championship series, 2–0 (Saint Mary's)	Won Pool 1 Round-Robin, 6–1 (Brock), 4–0 (Saskatchewan); Lost Championship, 2–3 (Alberta)
2008–09	AUS	28	21	4	–	3	–	45	1st	37	28	9	0	.757	Won Semifinal series, 3–0 (Acadia); Lost Championship series, 1–2 (Saint Mary's)	Won Pool A Round-Robin, 6–3 (Alberta), 3–1 (Lakehead); Won Championship, 4–2 (Western Ontario)
2009–10	AUS	28	27	1	–	0	–	54	1st	31	27	4	0	.871	Lost Semifinal series, 0–3 (St. Francis Xavier)	
2010–11	AUS	28	23	5	–	0	–	46	1st	40	32	8	0	.800	Won Semifinal series, 3–1 (Acadia); Won Championship series, 3–2 (St. Francis Xavier)	Won Pool B Round-Robin, 2–1 (Calgary), 4–0 (Western Ontario); Won Championship, 3–2 (McGill)
2011–12	AUS	28	20	5	–	3	–	43	1st	36	27	9	0	.750	Won Semifinal series, 3–0 (Prince Edward Island); Won Championship series, 3–0 (Moncton)	Lost Pool B Round-Robin, 6–1 (Quebec–Trois-Rivières), 2–3 (Western Ontario)
2012–13	AUS	28	23	5	–	0	0	46	1st	36	27	9	0	.750	Won Semifinal series, 3–1 (Prince Edward Island); Won Championship series, 2–1 (Saint Mary's)	Won Pool B Round-Robin, 3–1 (Saskatchewan), 8–3 (Quebec–Trois-Rivières); Won Championship, 2–0 (Saint Mary's)
2013–14	AUS	28	24	3	–	0	1	49	1st	32	25	6	1	.797	Lost Semifinal series, 1–3 (Saint Mary's)	
2014–15	AUS	28	22	4	–	2	0	46	1st	38	29	9	0	.763	Won Semifinal series, 3–2 (St. Francis Xavier); Won Championship series, 2–0 (Acadia)	Won Quarterfinal, 6–2 (Windsor); Won Semifinal, 5–2 (Guelph); Lost Championship, 3–6 (Alberta)
2015–16	AUS	28	23	3	–	1	1	48	1st	38	29	8	1	.776	Won Semifinal series, 3–2 (Prince Edward Island); Lost Championship series, 0–2 (St. Francis Xavier)	Won Quarterfinal, 5–1 (Western Ontario); Won Semifinal, 4–0 (Saint Mary's); Won Championship, 3–1 (St. Francis Xavier)
2016–17	AUS	30	25	2	–	2	1	53	1st	39	31	7	1	.808	Won Semifinal series, 3–1 (Saint Mary's); Lost Championship series, 0–2 (St. Francis Xavier)	Won Quarterfinal, 5–1 (Queen's); Won Semifinal, 3–0 (Acadia); Won Championship, 5–3 (Saskatchewan)
2017–18	AUS	30	24	2	–	3	1	52	1st	39	31	7	1	.808	Won Semifinal series, 3–0 (Saint Mary's); Won Championship series, 2–0 (St. Francis Xavier)	Won Quarterfinal, 8–1 (Concordia); Lost Semifinal, 4–5 (OT) (St. Francis Xavier); Won Third Place Game, 5–4 (OT) (Saskatchewan)
2018–19	AUS	30	25	2	–	2	1	53	1st	38	33	4	1	.882	Won Semifinal series, 3–0 (Prince Edward Island); Won Championship series, 2–0 (St. Francis Xavier)	Won Quarterfinal, 2–1 (Carleton); Won Semifinal, 9–1 (St. Francis Xavier); Won Championship, 4–2 (Alberta)
2019–20	AUS	30	26	4	–	0	0	52	1st	36	31	5	0	.861	Won Semifinal series, 3–0 (Moncton); Won Championship series, 2–1 (Acadia)	Quarterfinal, vs. (British Columbia) cancelled due to COVID-19 pandemic
2020–21	Season cancelled due to COVID-19 pandemic															
2021–22	AUS	24	21	3	–	0	0	42	1st	28	24	4	0	.857	Won Semifinal series, 2–0 (Moncton); Won Championship Game, 3–1 (St. Francis Xavier)	Lost Quarterfinal, 1–2 (Ryerson)
2022–23	AUS	30	24	4	–	1	1	50	1st	40	32	7	1	.813	Won Semifinal series, 3–1 (Moncton); Won Championship series, 2–1 (Saint Mary's)	Won Quarterfinal, 2–1 (Concordia); Won Semifinal, 6–3 (Quebec–Trois-Rivières); Won Championship, 3–0 (Alberta)
2023–24	AUS	30	30	0	–	0	0	60	1st	38	38	0	0	1.000	Won Semifinal series, 3–0 (Saint Mary's); Won Championship series, 2–0 (Moncton)	Won Quarterfinal, 4–0 (Brock); Won Semifinal, 7–0 (Toronto Metropolitan); Won Championship, 4–0 (Quebec–Trois-Rivières)
Rob Hennigar (2024–Present)
2024-25	AUS	30	28	1	–	1	0	57	1st	36	33	1	2	.944	Won Semifinal series, 3–0 (Acadia); Won Championship series, 2–0 (Moncton)	Lost Quarterfinal, 2-3 (OT) (Gee-Gees)
2025-26	AUS	30	20	8	–	2	0	42	1st	39	27	10	2	.718	Won Semifinal series, 3–0 (Prince Edward Island); Won Championship series, 2–1 (Moncton)	Won Quarterfinal, 5–2 (Queen's); Lost Semifinal, 4–7 (Quebec–Trois-Rivières); Won Third Place Game, 5–1 (Windsor)
Totals										GP	W	L	T/OTL	%	Championships	
Regular Season										1570	967	510	94	.645	5 West Division Titles, 6 MacAdam Division Titles, 3 MIAA Championships, 2 AUAA Championships, 18 AUS Championships	
Conference Postseason										199	136	89	63	.582	2 MIAA Championships, 3 AUAA Championships, 15 AUS Championships	
U Sports Postseason										59	45	14	4	.746	24 National tournament appearances	
Regular Season and Postseason Record										1828	1148	613	161	.639	10 National Championships	

Note: Totals include results from 1954–55 onward.
† Jeffrey replaced Nickelchok in the middle of the season.

== Players ==
=== Retired numbers ===
- 17 Mark Jeffrey (UNB Red Devils, 1981–1986)

=== NHL alumni ===
The following players have played in at least one National Hockey League (NHL) game post-collegiately as of the 2024-25 season:

- Darryl Boyce
- Kevin Henderson
- John LeBlanc
- Philippe Maillet

== See also ==
UNB Reds women's ice hockey
