= Saint Mary's Huskies men's ice hockey =

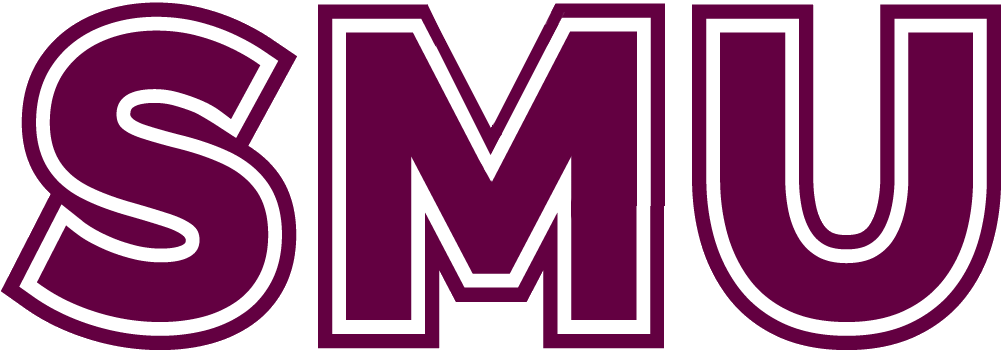
- University: Saint Mary's University
- Conference: AUS
- Head coach: Tyler Naugler; Since 2020–21 season
- Arena: Dauphinee Centre; Halifax, Nova Scotia
- Colors: Maroon and White

U Sports tournament champions
- 2010

U Sports tournament appearances
- 1969, 1970, 1971, 1972, 1973, 1974, 1975, 1977, 2002, 2009, 2010, 2013, 2016, 2020, 2023

Conference tournament champions
- 1930, 1942, 1969, 1970, 1971, 1972, 1973, 1974, 1975, 1977, 2002, 2009, 2010

The Saint Mary's Huskies men's ice hockey team is an ice hockey team representing the Saint Mary's Huskies athletics program of Saint Mary's University. The team is a member of the Atlantic University Sport conference and compete in U Sports. The team plays their home games at the Dauphinee Centre in Halifax, Nova Scotia.

== History ==
Saint Mary's ice hockey program had a difficult start, though at first it was entirely of their own making. The team joined the Maritime Intercollegiate Athletic Association in 1929 and promptly won the conference tournament that season. However, the school's administrators were not enamored by the Huskies' exploits. Three years later, when Saint Mary's had a chance for a second championship, the team was forbade from participating as the final game occurred during Lent. The following year, the Huskies withdrew from competition since the order remained in force. Due to Ash Wednesday falling later in 1935, the Huskies were able to return to play for two years but again withdrew prior to the 1937 postseason since Lent began on February 10. However, by 1940 Saint Mary's had relented on its prohibition and allowed the team to compete through the holiday season.

Now that it had persisted over the objections of its own administration, the ice hockey team then had to survive the difficulties brought upon by World War II. The MIAA conference had seen more than half of its nominal members suspend play for the duration of the war. Saint Mary's was one of just three schools to attempt to continue on but by 1944 the program had to finally admit defeat and halt play. Their suspension lasted just one season, however, and the team returned in the fall of 1945. Saint Mary's return didn't last long, and the team left the MIAA after 1948. The Huskies remained out of competition for several years, returning in 1954 when college teams shifted away from senior hockey. The time off had not done Saint Mary's any favors as he program was a shell of its former self. The Huskies muddled through the next decade before withdrawing from the MIAA in 1964.

After a three-year hiatus, Saint Mary's returned in style, finishing second in the conference upon their return. The team then reeled off seven consecutive league championships and finished as national runners-up four years in a row. The Huskies came back down to earth after their unprecedented run but still remained a power in the conference for several years. In 1984, however, disaster struck the program; At the conclusion of the season, Saint Mary's was getting ready for the playoffs when the program was ruled to have used an ineligible player. Wayne Fortune had played 11 games for the Saginaw Gears, a professional team, the year before. The Huskies were forced to forfeit all of their 13 wins and officially finished last with a record of 0–24. The controversy had a chilling effect on the program and Saint Mary's spent the next several years wallowing at the bottom of the standings.

The Saint Mary's ice hockey program didn't really recover until the close of the 20th century when it won its first regular season title in over 20 years. Two years later, the team captured a conference championship and returned to the national tournament for the first time in nearly 30 seasons. Saint Mary's would then slowly ramp up performance, culminating with a pair of league championships and its first national championship by the end of the decade. Since then, Saint Mary's has maintained a regular position near the top of the conference standings and made several more trips to the national tournament.

== Season-by-season results ==
=== Senior and collegiate play ===
Note: GP = Games played, W = Wins, L = Losses, T = Ties, Pts = Points

| U Sports Champion | U Sports Semifinalist | Conference regular season champions | Conference Division Champions | Conference Playoff Champions |

| Season | Conference | Regular Season | | | | | | | | | | | Conference Tournament Results | National Tournament Results |
| Season | Conference | Conference | | | | | | Overall | | | | | Conference Tournament Results | National Tournament Results |
| Season | Conference | GP | W | L | T | Pts* | Finish | GP | W | L | T | % | Conference Tournament Results | National Tournament Results |
|---|---|---|---|---|---|---|---|---|---|---|---|---|---|---|
Senior and Collegiate Hockey
| 1929–30 | MIAA | ? | ? | ? | ? | ? | ? | ? | ? | ? | ? | ? | Won Semifinal, 3–2 (St. Francis Xavier); Won Championship, 2–0 (New Brunswick) | |
| 1930–31 | MIAA | ? | ? | ? | ? | ? | ? | ? | ? | ? | ? | ? | Lost Semifinal, 2–3 (St. Francis Xavier) | |
| 1931–32 | MIAA | ? | ? | ? | ? | ? | ? | ? | ? | ? | ? | ? | Lost Semifinal, 1–4 (St. Francis Xavier) | |
| 1932–33 | MIAA | ? | ? | ? | ? | ? | ? | ? | ? | ? | ? | ? | Won Semifinal, 3–2 (Acadia); Lost Championship, forfeit (Mount Allison) | |
| 1933–34 | MIAA | ? | ? | ? | ? | ? | ? | ? | ? | ? | ? | ? | Withdrew | |
| 1934–35 | MIAA | ? | ? | ? | ? | ? | ? | ? | ? | ? | ? | ? | Won Halifax Final series, 4–3 (Dalhousie); Lost Quarterfinal series, 5–7 (St. Francis Xavier) | |
| 1935–36 | MIAA | ? | ? | ? | ? | ? | ? | ? | ? | ? | ? | ? | Lost Semifinal, 3–9 (St. Francis Xavier) | |
| 1936–37 | MIAA | 1 | 1 | 0 | 0 | 2 | ? | ? | ? | ? | ? | ? | Withdrew | |
| 1937–38 | MIAA | ? | ? | ? | ? | ? | ? | ? | ? | ? | ? | ? | Withdrew | |
| 1938–39 | MIAA | ? | ? | ? | ? | ? | ? | ? | ? | ? | ? | ? | Lost Semifinal, 3–5 (Acadia) | |
| 1939–40 | MIAA | ? | ? | ? | ? | ? | ? | ? | ? | ? | ? | ? | Won Quarterfinal, 4–1 (Dalhousie); Lost Semifinal series, 9–20 (Acadia) | |
| 1940–41 | MIAA | ? | ? | ? | ? | ? | ? | ? | ? | ? | ? | ? | Lost Semifinal series, 10–11 (St. Francis Xavier) | |
| 1941–42 | MIAA | ? | ? | ? | ? | ? | ? | ? | ? | ? | ? | ? | Won Semifinal series, 9–10 (St. Francis Xavier); Won Championship series, 12–11 (Acadia) | |
| 1942–43 | MIAA | ? | ? | ? | ? | ? | ? | ? | ? | ? | ? | ? | Won Semifinal series, 14–11 (Acadia); Lost Championship series, 7–14 (St. Francis Xavier) | |
| 1943–44 | MIAA | ? | ? | ? | ? | ? | ? | ? | ? | ? | ? | ? | Lost Semifinal series, 8–10 (Acadia) | |
Program suspended due to World War II
| 1945–46 | MIAA | 3 | 0 | 2 | 1 | .167 | ? | ? | ? | ? | ? | ? | | |
| 1946–47 | MIAA | 6 | 4 | 2 | 0 | .667 | ? | ? | ? | ? | ? | ? | | |
| 1947–48 | MIAA | 6 | 1 | 5 | 0 | .167 | 8th | ? | ? | ? | ? | ? | | |
Program suspended
| Totals | | | | | | | | GP | W | L | T | % | Championships | |
| Regular Season | | | | | | | | ? | ? | ? | ? | ? | 13 MIAA Division Championships, 10 MIAA Championships | |
| Conference Post-season | | | | | | | | ? | ? | ? | ? | ? | 3 Hewson Cups, 15 MIAA Championships | |
| Regular Season and Postseason Record | | | | | | | | ? | ? | ? | ? | ? | | |

=== Collegiate only ===
Note: GP = Games played, W = Wins, L = Losses, T = Ties, OTL = Overtime Losses, SOL = Shootout Losses, Pts = Points

| U Sports Champion | U Sports Semifinalist | Conference regular season champions | Conference Division Champions | Conference Playoff Champions |

| Season | Conference | Regular Season | | | | | | | | | | | | | Conference Tournament Results | National Tournament Results |
| Season | Conference | Conference | | | | | | | | Overall | | | | | Conference Tournament Results | National Tournament Results |
| Season | Conference | GP | W | L | T | OTL | SOL | Pts* | Finish | GP | W | L | T | % | Conference Tournament Results | National Tournament Results |
|---|---|---|---|---|---|---|---|---|---|---|---|---|---|---|---|---|
| 1954–55 | MIAA | 12 | 4 | 7 | 1 | – | – | 9 | T–5th | 12 | 4 | 7 | 1 | .375 | | |
| 1955–56 | MIAA | 8 | 2 | 6 | 0 | – | – | 4 | 7th | 10 | 2 | 7 | 1 | .250 | Lost Quarterfinal series, 4–5 (Acadia) | |
| 1956–57 | MIAA | 7 | 0 | 7 | 0 | – | – | 0 | T–8th | 7 | 0 | 7 | 0 | .000 | | |
| 1957–58 | MIAA | 8 | 2 | 6 | 0 | – | – | 4 | T–7th | 8 | 2 | 6 | 0 | .250 | | |
| 1958–59 | MIAA | 8 | 2 | 6 | 0 | – | – | 4 | 7th | 10 | 2 | 7 | 1 | .250 | Lost Quarterfinal series, 10–12 (Dalhousie) | |
| 1959–60 | MIAA | 8 | 4 | 3 | 1 | – | – | 9 | 4th | 12 | 6 | 4 | 2 | .583 | Won Quarterfinal series, 8–6 (Dalhousie); Lost Semifinal series, 8–12 (St. Francis Xavier) | |
| 1960–61 | MIAA | 8 | 4 | 3 | 1 | – | – | 9 | 4th | 12 | 6 | 5 | 1 | .542 | Won Quarterfinal series, 11–9 (Dalhousie); Lost Semifinal series, 3–13 (St. Francis Xavier) | |
| 1961–62 | MIAA | 7 | 1 | 4 | 2 | – | – | 4 | T–5th | 9 | 1 | 6 | 2 | .222 | Lost Quarterfinal series, 3–7 (Acadia) | |
| 1962–63 | MIAA | 12 | 0 | 11 | 1 | – | – | 1 | 9th | 12 | 0 | 11 | 1 | .042 | | |
| 1963–64 | MIAA | 12 | 4 | 8 | 0 | – | – | 8 | 7th | 12 | 4 | 8 | 0 | .333 | | |
Program suspended
| 1967–68 | MIAA | 16 | 12 | 4 | 0 | – | – | 24 | 2nd | 18 | 13 | 5 | 0 | .722 | Won Semifinal, 7–2 (Acadia); Lost Championship, 6–9 (St. Francis Xavier) | |
| 1968–69 | AIAA | 18 | 13 | 5 | 0 | – | – | 26 | 2nd | 22 | 15 | 7 | 0 | .682 | Won Semifinal, 6–4 (Acadia); Won Championship, 4–2 (St. Thomas) | Lost Semifinal, 3–5 (Sir George Williams); Lost Consolation Final, 3–5 (Alberta) |
| 1969–70 | AIAA | 18 | 15 | 1 | 2 | – | – | 32 | 1st | 23 | 19 | 2 | 2 | .870 | Won Semifinal, 7–1 (St. Thomas); Won Championship, 6–5 (St. Francis Xavier) | Won Quarterfinal, 4–1 (York); Won Semifinal, 4–0 (Loyola); Lost Championship, 2–3 (Toronto) |
| 1970–71 | AIAA | 18 | 17 | 1 | 0 | – | – | 34 | 1st | 22 | 20 | 2 | 0 | .909 | Won Semifinal, 5–1 (Prince Edward Island); Won Championship, 8–4 (Dalhousie) | Won Semifinal, 4–2 (Laurentian); Lost Championship, 4–5 (Toronto) |
| 1971–72 | AIAA | 18 | 15 | 2 | 1 | – | – | 31 | 1st | 22 | 18 | 3 | 1 | .841 | Won Semifinal, 4–2 (Memorial); Won Championship, 7–1 (Prince Edward Island) | Won Semifinal, 4–3 (Alberta); Lost Championship, 0–5 (Toronto) |
| 1972–73 | AIAA | 20 | 20 | 0 | 0 | – | – | 1.000 | 1st | 25 | 24 | 1 | 0 | .960 | Won Semifinal, 9–1 (Prince Edward Island); Won Championship, 7–1 (Moncton) | Won Semifinal series, 2–0 (Loyola); Lost Championship, 2–3 (Toronto) |
| 1973–74 | AUAA | 21 | 19 | 2 | 0 | – | – | .905 | 1st | 26 | 22 | 4 | 0 | .846 | Won Semifinal, 7–0 (New Brunswick); Won Championship, 12–2 (Moncton) | Lost Semifinal series, 1–2 (Sir George Williams) |
| 1974–75 | AUAA | 18 | 16 | 1 | 1 | – | – | 33 | 1st | 23 | 19 | 3 | 1 | .848 | Won Semifinal, 7–3 (Dalhousie); Won Championship, 9–2 (Acadia) | Lost Semifinal series, 1–2 (Toronto) |
| 1975–76 | AUAA | 16 | 15 | 1 | 0 | – | – | 30 | 1st | 17 | 15 | 2 | 0 | .882 | Lost Semifinal, 5–9 (Moncton) | |
| 1976–77 | AUAA | 20 | 16 | 3 | 1 | – | – | 33 | 2nd | 24 | 18 | 4 | 2 | .792 | Won Semifinal series, 2–0 (Moncton); Won Championship series, 2–0 (St. Francis Xavier) | Won Quarterfinal series, 2–1 (Concordia); Lost Semifinal series, 5–12 (Alberta) |
| 1977–78 | AUAA | 20 | 18 | 2 | 0 | – | – | 36 | 1st | 27 | 22 | 5 | 0 | .815 | Won Semifinal series, 2–0 (Moncton); Lost Championship series, 2–3 (St. Francis Xavier) | |
| 1978–79 | AUAA | 20 | 15 | 4 | 1 | – | – | 31 | 1st | 26 | 18 | 7 | 1 | .712 | Won Semifinal series, 2–1 (Prince Edward Island); Lost Championship series, 1–2 (Dalhousie) | |
| 1979–80 | AUAA | 29 | 17 | 10 | 2 | – | – | 36 | 3rd | 33 | 19 | 12 | 2 | .362 | Won Quarterfinal, 4–0 (Mount Allison); Lost Semifinal series, 1–2 (Moncton) | |
| 1980–81 | AUAA | 24 | 13 | 11 | 0 | – | – | 26 | 4th | 25 | 13 | 12 | 0 | .520 | Lost Quarterfinal, 0–4 (New Brunswick) | |
| 1981–82 | AUAA | 26 | 16 | 7 | 3 | – | – | 35 | 3rd | 28 | 16 | 9 | 3 | .625 | Lost Pool 2 Round-Robin, 3–4 (Mount Allison), 1–4 (Moncton) | |
| 1982–83 | AUAA | 24 | 12 | 11 | 1 | – | – | 25 | 4th | 26 | 12 | 13 | 1 | .481 | Lost Quarterfinal, 0–4 (Moncton) | |
| 1983–84 | AUAA | 24 | 0 ^{†} | 24 ^{†} | 0 ^{†} | – | – | 0 ^{†} | 9th ^{†} | 24 | 0 ^{†} | 24 ^{†} | 0 ^{†} | .000 ^{†} | | |
| 1984–85 | AUAA | 24 | 7 | 17 | 0 | – | – | 14 | 8th | 24 | 7 | 17 | 0 | .292 | | |
| 1985–86 | AUAA | 25 | 0 | 25 | 0 | – | – | .000 | 9th | 25 | 0 | 25 | 0 | .000 | | |
| 1986–87 | AUAA | 25 | 7 | 18 | 0 | – | – | .280 | 8th | 25 | 7 | 18 | 0 | .280 | | |
| 1987–88 | AUAA | 24 | 7 | 17 | 0 | – | – | 14 | 7th | 24 | 7 | 17 | 0 | .292 | | |
| 1988–89 | AUAA | 26 | 17 | 8 | 1 | – | – | 35 | T–2nd | 28 | 17 | 10 | 1 | .625 | Lost Quarterfinal series, 0–2 (Dalhousie) | |
| 1989–90 | AUAA | 22 | 5 | 15 | 2 | – | – | 12 | 9th | 22 | 5 | 15 | 2 | .273 | | |
| 1990–91 | AUAA | 26 | 9 | 16 | 1 | – | – | 19 | 9th | 26 | 9 | 16 | 1 | .365 | | |
| 1991–92 | AUAA | 26 | 9 | 13 | 4 | – | – | 22 | 6th | 29 | 10 | 15 | 4 | .414 | Lost Division Semifinal series, 1–2 (Dalhousie) | |
| 1992–93 | AUAA | 26 | 12 | 13 | 1 | – | – | 25 | 5th | 28 | 12 | 15 | 1 | .446 | Lost Division Semifinal series, 0–2 (Dalhousie) | |
| 1993–94 | AUAA | 26 | 12 | 11 | 3 | – | – | 27 | 6th | 28 | 12 | 13 | 3 | .482 | Lost Division Semifinal series, 0–2 (Dalhousie) | |
| 1994–95 | AUAA | 26 | 10 | 15 | 1 | – | – | 21 | 7th | 28 | 10 | 17 | 1 | .375 | Lost Division Semifinal series, 0–2 (Dalhousie) | |
| 1995–96 | AUAA | 26 | 10 | 15 | 1 | – | – | 21 | 8th | 28 | 10 | 17 | 1 | .375 | Lost Division Semifinal series, 0–2 (Acadia) | |
| 1996–97 | AUAA | 28 | 5 | 20 | 3 | – | – | 13 | 8th | 30 | 5 | 22 | 3 | .217 | Lost Division Semifinal series, 0–2 (Acadia) | |
| 1997–98 | AUAA | 28 | 8 | 16 | 4 | 1 | – | 21 | 8th | 31 | 9 | 18 | 4 | .355 | Lost Quarterfinal series, 1–2 (St. Francis Xavier) | |
| 1998–99 | AUS | 26 | 13 | 11 | 2 | 1 | – | 29 | 4th | 29 | 14 | 13 | 2 | .517 | Lost Quarterfinal series, 1–2 (Acadia) | |
| 1999–00 | AUS | 26 | 18 | 8 | 0 | 5 | – | 41 | 1st | 32 | 21 | 11 | 0 | .656 | Won Quarterfinal series, 2–1 (Dalhousie); Lost Semifinal series, 1–2 (Acadia) | |
| 2000–01 | AUS | 28 | 11 | 14 | 3 | 2 | – | 27 | 6th | 30 | 11 | 16 | 3 | .417 | Lost Quarterfinal series, 0–2 (Dalhousie) | |
| 2001–02 | AUS | 28 | 14 | 6 | 6 | 2 | – | 36 | 2nd | 37 | 20 | 11 | 6 | .622 | Won Semifinal series, 2–0 (Moncton); Won Championship series, 3–2 (Dalhousie) | Lost Pool B Round-Robin, 3–1 (Saskatchewan), 3–5 (Quebec–Trois-Rivières) |
| 2002–03 | AUS | 28 | 14 | 13 | 1 | 0 | – | 29 | 5th | 30 | 14 | 15 | 1 | .483 | Lost Quarterfinal series, 0–2 (New Brunswick) | |
| 2003–04 | AUS | 28 | 14 | 11 | 2 | 1 | – | 31 | 3rd | 31 | 15 | 14 | 2 | .516 | Lost Quarterfinal series, 1–2 (St. Thomas) | |
| 2004–05 | AUS | 28 | 15 | 11 | 1 | 1 | – | 32 | 3rd | 32 | 17 | 14 | 1 | .547 | Won Quarterfinal series, 2–0 (Prince Edward Island); Lost Semifinal series, 1–3 (Moncton) | |
| 2005–06 | AUS | 28 | 16 | 9 | 3 | 0 | – | 35 | 4th | 33 | 18 | 12 | 3 | .591 | Won Quarterfinal series, 2–1 (St. Thomas); Lost Semifinal series, 0–2 (Acadia) | |
| 2006–07 | AUS | 28 | 15 | 10 | – | 3 | – | 33 | 4th | 31 | 16 | 15 | 0 | .516 | Won Quarterfinal series, 1–2 (St. Thomas) | |
| 2007–08 | AUS | 28 | 20 | 5 | – | 3 | – | 43 | 2nd | 33 | 23 | 10 | 0 | .697 | Won Semifinal series, 3–0 (Moncton); Lost Championship series, 0–2 (New Brunswick) | |
| 2008–09 | AUS | 28 | 20 | 7 | – | 1 | – | 41 | 2nd | 37 | 26 | 11 | 0 | .703 | Won Semifinal series, 3–1 (Moncton); Won Championship series, 2–1 (New Brunswick) | Lost Pool B Round-Robin, 4–1 (McGill), 2–7 (Western Ontario) |
| 2009–10 | AUS | 28 | 16 | 8 | – | 4 | – | 36 | 3rd | 41 | 28 | 13 | 0 | .683 | Won Quarterfinal series, 2–0 (Moncton); Won Semifinal series, 3–1 (Acadia); Won Championship series, 3–0 (St. Francis Xavier) | Won Pool B Round-Robin, 4–2 (McGill), 5–0 (Manitoba); Won Championship, 3–2 (2OT) (Alberta) |
| 2010–11 | AUS | 28 | 18 | 9 | – | 1 | – | 37 | 2nd | 33 | 20 | 13 | 0 | .606 | Lost Semifinal series, 2–3 (St. Francis Xavier) | |
| 2011–12 | AUS | 28 | 18 | 7 | – | 3 | – | 39 | 2nd | 32 | 19 | 13 | 0 | .594 | Lost Semifinal series, 1–3 (Moncton) | |
| 2012–13 | AUS | 28 | 18 | 7 | – | 3 | 0 | 39 | 2nd | 38 | 23 | 15 | 0 | .605 | Won Semifinal series, 3–1 (Acadia); Lost Championship series, 1–2 (New Brunswick) | Won Pool A Round-Robin, 3–4 (OT) (Alberta), 5–1 (Waterloo); Lost Championship, 0–2 (New Brunswick) |
| 2013–14 | AUS | 28 | 14 | 14 | – | 0 | 0 | 28 | 5th | 39 | 20 | 19 | 0 | .513 | Won Quarterfinal series, 2–1 (Prince Edward Island); Won Semifinal series, 3–1 (New Brunswick); Lost Championship series, 1–3 (Acadia) | |
| 2014–15 | AUS | 28 | 20 | 7 | – | 1 | 0 | 41 | 3rd | 36 | 24 | 12 | 0 | .667 | Won Quarterfinal series, 2–1 (Moncton); Lost Semifinal series, 2–3 (Acadia) | |
| 2015–16 | AUS | 28 | 17 | 8 | – | 2 | 1 | 37 | 4th | 37 | 22 | 14 | 1 | .608 | Won Quarterfinal series, 2–0 (Moncton); Lost Semifinal series, 1–3 (St. Francis Xavier) | Won Quarterfinal, 3–2 (Quebec–Trois-Rivières); Lost Semifinal, 0–4 (New Brunswick); Won Bronze Medal game, 5–2 (Saskatchewan) |
| 2016–17 | AUS | 30 | 15 | 14 | – | 1 | 0 | 31 | 4th | 39 | 18 | 21 | 0 | .462 | Won Quarterfinal series, 2–1 (Prince Edward Island); Lost Semifinal series, 1–3 (New Brunswick); Lost Third Place series, 0–2 (Acadia) | |
| 2017–18 | AUS | 30 | 18 | 10 | – | 2 | 0 | 38 | 4th | 39 | 21 | 18 | 0 | .538 | Won Quarterfinal series, 2–1 (Prince Edward Island); Lost Semifinal series, 0–3 (New Brunswick); Lost Third Place series, 1–2 (Acadia) | |
| 2018–19 | AUS | 30 | 19 | 10 | – | 1 | 0 | 39 | 2nd | 35 | 21 | 14 | 0 | .600 | Lost Semifinal series, 2–3 (St. Francis Xavier) | |
| 2019–20 | AUS | 30 | 17 | 12 | – | 1 | 0 | 35 | 3rd | 39 | 23 | 16 | 0 | .590 | Won Quarterfinal series, 2–0 (Prince Edward Island); Lost Semifinal series, 1–3 (Acadia); Won Third Place series, 2–0 (Moncton) | Won Quarterfinal, 5–1 (Guelph); Remainder of tournament cancelled |
| 2020–21 | Season cancelled due to COVID-19 pandemic | | | | | | | | | | | | | | | |
| 2021–22 | AUS | 23 | 10 | 11 | – | 1 | 1 | 22 | 5th | 27 | 12 | 14 | 1 | .463 | Won Quarterfinal series, 2–0 (Prince Edward Island); Lost Semifinal series, 0–2 (St. Francis Xavier) | |
| 2022–23 | AUS | 30 | 20 | 9 | – | 1 | 0 | 41 | 2nd | 38 | 24 | 14 | 0 | .632 | Won Semifinal series, 3–1 (Acadia); Lost Championship series, 1–2 (New Brunswick) | Lost Quarterfinal, 1–4 (Quebec–Trois-Rivières) |
| 2023–24 | AUS | 30 | 15 | 14 | – | 1 | 0 | 31 | 4th | 35 | 17 | 18 | 0 | .486 | Won Quarterfinal series, 2–0 (Prince Edward Island); Lost Semifinal series, 0–3 (New Brunswick) | |
| Totals | | | | | | | | | | GP | W | L | T/SOL | % | Championships | |
| Regular Season | | | | | | | | | | 1501 | 795 | 647 | 59 | .549 | 1 South Division Title, 1 Kelly Division Title, 4 AIAA Championships, 5 AUAA Championships, 1 AUS Championship | |
| Conference Post-season | | | | | | | | | | 215 | 103 | 108 | 4 | .488 | 5 AIAA Championships, 3 AUAA Championships, 3 AUS Championships | |
| U Sports Postseason | | | | | | | | | | 38 | 19 | 19 | 0 | .500 | 15 National tournament appearances | |
| Regular Season and Postseason Record | | | | | | | | | | 1754 | 917 | 774 | 63 | .541 | 1 National Championship | |

Note: Totals include results from 1954 to 1955 onward.
† Saint Mary's was forced to forfeit 13 wins after the end of the regular season. They dropped from 4th to 9th place as a result.

== See also ==
Saint Mary's Huskies women's ice hockey
