= AUS men's ice hockey tournament =

Atlantic University Sport men's ice hockey tournament
- Conference hockey championship
- Sport: Ice hockey
- Conference: Atlantic University Sport
- Format: Single-elimination
- Played: 1999–present

The Atlantic University Sport ice hockey tournament is an annual conference championship held between member teams. The winner receives an automatic bid to the U Sports men's ice hockey championship.

== History ==
The formation of the conference occurred after the maritime schools restarted their ice hockey programs after World War I. For its inaugural season, the league instituted a tournament. Originally, the conference was called the "Maritime Intercollegiate Athletic Association" (MIAA) but changed its moniker to the "Atlantic Intercollegiate Athletic Association" (AIAA) in 1968. In 1973, the conference merged with "Atlantic Women's Intercollegiate Athletic Association" (AWIAA) to become the "Atlantic Universities Athletic Association" (AUAA). The conference name remained that way until rebranding as "Atlantic University Sport" (AUS) in 1998.

== 1999 ==
Kelly			MacAdam		
Seed	School	Standings	Seed	School	Standings
1	St. Francis Xavier	14–10–2–0	1	St. Thomas	14–9–3–2
2	Acadia	14–10–2–0	2	New Brunswick	13–12–1–1
3	Saint Mary's	13–11–2–1	3	Moncton	12–11–3–1
4	Dalhousie	10–14–2–0	4	Prince Edward Island	6–19–1–3

Quarterfinals
1	St. Francis Xavier	2	6	-
4	Dalhousie	1	1	-
Kelly Division
2	Acadia	3	3	1
3	Saint Mary’s	2	6	0
1	St. Thomas	2	6	-
4	Prince Edward Island	1	5	-
MacAdam Division
2	New Brunswick	6	2	4
3	Moncton	2	4	5

Semifinals
1	St. Francis Xavier	5	5	3
2	Acadia	2	6	6
1	St. Thomas	5	1	-
3	Moncton	7	2	-

Championship
K2	Acadia	2	5	3
M3	Moncton	4	4	5

Note: * denotes overtime period(s)

== 2000 ==
Kelly			MacAdam		
Seed	School	Standings	Seed	School	Standings
1	Saint Mary's	18–8–0–5	1	St. Thomas	18–8–0–2
2	St. Francis Xavier	15–11–0–5	2	New Brunswick	15–11–0–0
3	Acadia	13–13–0–2	3	Moncton	14–12–0–1
4	Dalhousie	5–21–0–5	4	Prince Edward Island	6–20–0–2

Quarterfinals
1	Saint Mary’s	4	4	6
4	Dalhousie	1	5	2
Kelly Division
2	St. Francis Xavier	1	2	-
3	Acadia	2	4	-
1	St. Thomas	9	5	-
4	Prince Edward Island	2	2	-
MacAdam Division
2	New Brunswick	6	3	-
3	Moncton	5	0	-

Semifinals
1	Saint Mary’s	6	1	1
3	Acadia	2	4	2
1	St. Thomas	6	1	0
2	New Brunswick	2	2	7

Championship
K3	Acadia	4	4	2	3	-
M2	New Brunswick	2	5	3	4	-

Note: * denotes overtime period(s)

== 2001 ==
Seed	School	Standings	Seed	School	Standings
1	St. Francis Xavier	17–8–3–2	5	Acadia	11–13–4–1
2	St. Thomas	16–8–4–1	6	Saint Mary's	11–14–3–2
3	Dalhousie	15–12–1–1	7	Moncton	7–16–4–2
4	New Brunswick	13–10–5–0	8	Prince Edward Island	8–17–2–1

Quarterfinals
3	Dalhousie	2	2	-
6	Saint Mary’s	1	1	-
4	New Brunswick	1	4	4
5	Acadia	5	3	1

Semifinals
1	St. Francis Xavier	1	5	5
4	New Brunswick	4	4	4
2	St. Thomas	7	1	4
3	Dalhousie	3	3	1

Championship
1	St. Francis Xavier	3	9	1
2	St. Thomas	6	1	2

Note: * denotes overtime period(s)

== 2002 ==
Seed	School	Standings	Seed	School	Standings
1	Dalhousie	17–7–2–2	5	Prince Edward Island	12–11–3–2
2	Saint Mary's	14–6–6–2	6	St. Francis Xavier	9–10–6–3
3	Moncton	16–9–2–1	7	Acadia	9–12–3–4
4	New Brunswick	14–10–4–0	8	St. Thomas	7–18–2–1

Quarterfinals
3	Moncton	6	0	5
6	St. Francis Xavier	0	2	4
4	New Brunswick	4	7	-
5	Prince Edward Island	2	4	-

Semifinals
1	Dalhousie	6	4	-
4	New Brunswick	3	3	-
2	Saint Mary’s	7	3	-
3	Moncton	2	2	-

Championship
1	Dalhousie	1	3	4	3	1
2	Saint Mary’s	3	2	5	1	2

Note: * denotes overtime period(s)

== 2003 ==
Seed	School	Standings	Seed	School	Standings
1	St. Thomas	16–7–5	5	Saint Mary's	14–13–1
2	Dalhousie	16–9–3	6	Prince Edward Island	10–15–3
3	St. Francis Xavier	14–12–2	7	Acadia	10–17–1
4	New Brunswick	15–12–1	8	Moncton	9–19–0

Quarterfinals
3	St. Francis Xavier	3	4	-
6	Prince Edward Island	0	0	-
4	New Brunswick	2	3	-
5	Saint Mary’s	0	1	-

Semifinals
1	St. Thomas	3	2	1
4	New Brunswick	5	1	4
2	Dalhousie	4	1	4
3	St. Francis Xavier	0	3	6

Championship
4	New Brunswick	3	2	5	4	-
3	St. Francis Xavier	1	4	3	3	-

Note: * denotes overtime period(s)

== 2004 ==
Seed	School	Standings	Seed	School	Standings
1	St. Francis Xavier	19–6–3–0	5	Prince Edward Island	13–13–2–0
2	New Brunswick	16–5–3–4	6	St. Thomas	11–13–2–2
3	Saint Mary's	14–11–2–1	7	Acadia	11–15–1–1
4	Dalhousie	11–9–2–6	8	Moncton	8–15–3–2

Quarterfinals
3	Saint Mary’s	2	4	1
6	St. Thomas	4	1	4
4	Dalhousie	5	2	3
5	Prince Edward Island	6	1	2

Semifinals
1	St. Francis Xavier	1	5	4
6	St. Thomas	2	1	1
2	New Brunswick	4	3	-
3	Dalhousie	5	4	-

Championship
1	St. Francis Xavier	4	3	2	-	-
3	Dalhousie	1	2	1	-	-

Note: * denotes overtime period(s)

== 2005 ==
Seed	School	Standings	Seed	School	Standings
1	Acadia	14–8–6–0	5	St. Francis Xavier	11–10–6–1
2	Moncton	14–8–4–2	6	Prince Edward Island	11–11–6–0
3	Saint Mary's	15–11–1–1	7	Dalhousie	8–15–4–1
4	New Brunswick	15–11–1–1	8	St. Thomas	9–17–2–0

Quarterfinals
3	Saint Mary’s	5	5	-
6	Prince Edward Island	2	2	-
4	New Brunswick	4	2	-
5	St. Francis Xavier	2	1	-

Semifinals
1	Acadia	3	4	-
4	New Brunswick	1	1	-
2	Moncton	5	5	-
3	Saint Mary’s	3	4	-

Championship
1	Acadia	4	2	1	4	2
2	Moncton	3	4	2	2	3

Note: * denotes overtime period(s)

== 2006 ==
Seed	School	Standings	Seed	School	Standings
1	Acadia	19–7–1–1	5	St. Thomas	14–9–2–3
2	Moncton	18–8–1–1	6	St. Francis Xavier	13–11–1–3
3	New Brunswick	15–8–4–1	7	Prince Edward Island	8–20–0–0
4	Saint Mary's	16–9–3–0	8	Dalhousie	3–25–0–0

Quarterfinals
3	New Brunswick	7	3	9
6	St. Francis Xavier	5	4*	3
4	Saint Mary’s	0	5	3
5	St. Thomas	1	3	1

Semifinals
1	Acadia	8	5	-
4	Saint Mary’s	4	2	-
2	Moncton	3	1	-
3	New Brunswick	5	4	-

Championship
1	Acadia	2	5	5	-	-
3	New Brunswick	1	3	3	-	-

Note: * denotes overtime period(s)

== 2007 ==
Seed	School	Standings	Seed	School	Standings
1	Moncton	22–4–2	5	St. Thomas	14–14–0
2	New Brunswick	18–7–3	6	Acadia	11–14–3
3	St. Francis Xavier	16–9–3	7	Prince Edward Island	9–17–2
4	Saint Mary's	15–10–3	8	Dalhousie	7–16–5

Quarterfinals
3	St. Francis Xavier	2	4	-
6	Acadia	1	3	-
4	Saint Mary’s	3	5	6
5	St. Thomas	5	4	7

Semifinals
1	Moncton	4	6	6	-	-
5	St. Thomas	3	0	3	-	-
2	New Brunswick	4	4	2	2	-
3	St. Francis Xavier	1	2	5	1	-

Championship
1	Moncton	4	3	-
2	New Brunswick	2	2	-

Note: * denotes overtime period(s)

== 2008 ==
Seed	School	Standings	Seed	School	Standings
1	New Brunswick	26–1–1	5	St. Francis Xavier	12–12–4
2	Saint Mary's	20–5–3	6	Acadia	11–14–3
3	Moncton	17–10–1	7	Prince Edward Island	10–16–2
4	St. Thomas	11–11–6	8	Dalhousie	5–20–3

Quarterfinals
3	Moncton	5	7	-
6	Acadia	0	2	-
4	St. Thomas	2	2	4
5	St. Francis Xavier	1	4	0

Semifinals
1	New Brunswick	5	5	4	-	-
4	St. Thomas	1	4	1	-	-
2	Saint Mary’s	6	5	4	-	-
3	Moncton	2	1	2	-	-

Championship
1	New Brunswick	3	3	-
2	Saint Mary’s	2	2	-

Note: * denotes overtime period(s)

== 2009 ==
Seed	School	Standings	Seed	School	Standings
1	New Brunswick	21–4–3	5	Acadia	15–12–1
2	Saint Mary's	20–7–1	6	Prince Edward Island	13–12–3
3	Moncton	16–8–4	7	St. Thomas	8–16–4
4	St. Francis Xavier	15–11–2	8	Dalhousie	4–23–1

Quarterfinals
3	Moncton	8	1	4
6	Prince Edward Island	4	3	3
4	St. Francis Xavier	4	2	-
5	Acadia	5	4	-

Semifinals
1	New Brunswick	5	1	3	-	-
5	Acadia	2	0	2	-	-
2	Saint Mary’s	5	0	4	4	-
3	Moncton	4	2	3	3	-

Championship
1	New Brunswick	5	2	1
2	Saint Mary’s	1	3	5

Note: * denotes overtime period(s)

== 2010 ==
Seed	School	Standings	Seed	School	Standings
1	New Brunswick	27–1–0	5	St. Francis Xavier	11–12–5
2	Acadia	19–6–3	6	Moncton	9–16–3
3	Saint Mary's	16–8–4	7	Dalhousie	8–16–4
4	Prince Edward Island	15–11–2	8	St. Thomas	7–19–2

Quarterfinals
3	Saint Mary’s	2	4	-
6	Moncton	1	2	-
4	Prince Edward Island	2	2	-
5	St. Francis Xavier	3	3	-

Semifinals
1	New Brunswick	2	2	2	-	-
5	St. Francis Xavier	3	3	3	-	-
2	Acadia	2	2	1	2	-
3	Saint Mary’s	1	4	3	9	-

Championship
5	St. Francis Xavier	1	2	3	-	-
3	Saint Mary’s	7	3	5	-	-

Note: * denotes overtime period(s)

== 2011 ==
Seed	School	Standings	Seed	School	Standings
1	New Brunswick	23–5–0	5	Prince Edward Island	14–11–3
2	Saint Mary's	18–9–1	6	Dalhousie	13–15–0
3	St. Francis Xavier	17–10–1	7	Moncton	10–15–3
4	Acadia	14–11–3	8	St. Thomas	3–21–4

Quarterfinals
3	St. Francis Xavier	4	3	-
6	Dalhousie	0	2	-
4	Acadia	1	1	-
5	Prince Edward Island	0	0	-

Semifinals
1	New Brunswick	4	3	1	3	-
4	Acadia	0	2	3	2	-
2	Saint Mary’s	3	4	2	4	2
3	St. Francis Xavier	5	3	3	1	3

Championship
1	New Brunswick	3	1	2	3	5
3	St. Francis Xavier	2	2	0	6	4

Note: * denotes overtime period(s)

== 2012 ==
Seed	School	Standings	Seed	School	Standings
1	New Brunswick	20–5–3	5	Acadia	16–10–2
2	Saint Mary's	18–7–3	6	St. Francis Xavier	10–14–4
3	Moncton	18–9–1	7	Dalhousie	7–18–3
4	Prince Edward Island	18–10–0	8	St. Thomas	5–18–5

Quarterfinals
3	Moncton	3	2	1
6	St. Francis Xavier	0	3	0
4	Prince Edward Island	4	3	6
5	Acadia	3	4	5

Semifinals
1	New Brunswick	4	5	3	-	-
4	Prince Edward Island	3	1	2	-	-
2	Saint Mary’s	6	1	1	1	-
3	Moncton	2	3	6	2	-

Championship
1	New Brunswick	8	4	4	-	-
3	Moncton	3	2	0	-	-

Note: * denotes overtime period(s)

== 2013 ==
Seed	School	Standings	Seed	School	Standings
1	New Brunswick	23–5–0	5	Prince Edward Island	15–11–2
2	Saint Mary's	18–7–3	6	Moncton	12–10–6
3	Acadia	17–9–2	7	Dalhousie	8–17–3
4	St. Francis Xavier	16–10–2	8	St. Thomas	3–24–1

Quarterfinals
3	Acadia	5	5	4
6	Moncton	7	2	3
4	St. Francis Xavier	3	4	-
5	Prince Edward Island	4	5	-

Semifinals
1	New Brunswick	7	2	7	5	-
5	Prince Edward Island	2	4	2	1	-
2	Saint Mary’s	2	4	3	1	-
3	Acadia	3	2	2	0	-

Championship
1	New Brunswick	1	2	2
2	Saint Mary’s	0	5	0

Note: * denotes overtime period(s)

== 2014 ==
Seed	School	Standings	Seed	School	Standings
1	New Brunswick	24–3–0–1	5	Saint Mary's	14–14–0–0
2	Acadia	21–4–2–1	6	St. Francis Xavier	12–13–2–1
3	Moncton	17–11–0–0	7	St. Thomas	6–20–2–0
4	Prince Edward Island	15–10–2–1	8	Dalhousie	3–24–1–0

Quarterfinals
3	Moncton	3	6	-
6	St. Francis Xavier	1	1	-
4	Prince Edward Island	3	1	1
5	Saint Mary's	1	4	4

Semifinals
1	New Brunswick	1	5	1	0	-
5	Saint Mary's	2*	2	2*	1	-
2	Acadia	5	6*	1	3	-
3	Moncton	2	5	4	2	-

Championship
5	Saint Mary’s	3	0	2	1	-
2	Acadia	6	3	1	3	-

Note: * denotes overtime period(s)

== 2015 ==
Seed	School	Standings	Seed	School	Standings
1	New Brunswick	22–4–2–0	5	Prince Edward Island	13–13–2–0
2	Acadia	20–5–3–0	6	Moncton	11–14–2–1
3	Saint Mary's	20–7–1–0	7	Dalhousie	7–20–1–0
4	St. Francis Xavier	17–9–1–1	8	St. Thomas	2–22–4–1

Quarterfinals
3	Saint Mary’s	2	1	2
6	Moncton	0	5	0
4	St. Francis Xavier	4	3	-
5	Prince Edward Island	2	1	-

Semifinals
1	New Brunswick	5	2	1	2	6
4	St. Francis Xavier	2	1	3	4	3
2	Acadia	2	4	0	2	3
3	Saint Mary’s	3	3	4	1	2

Championship
1	New Brunswick	8	4	-
2	Acadia	2	2	-

Note: * denotes overtime period(s) | class="col-break col-break-2" |

== 2016 ==
Seed	School	Standings	Seed	School	Standings
1	New Brunswick	23–3–1–1	5	Moncton	13–13–2–0
2	St. Francis Xavier	18–6–4–0	6	Prince Edward Island	11–14–2–1
3	Acadia	19–7–1–1	7	Dalhousie	9–15–3–1
4	Saint Mary's	17–8–2–1	8	St. Thomas	2–25–0–1

Quarterfinals
3	Acadia	3	3	-
6	Prince Edward Island	6	4*	-
4	Saint Mary’s	3	9	-
5	Moncton	2	2	-

Semifinals
1	New Brunswick	4	5	4	-	-
6	Prince Edward Island	1	2	0	-	-
2	St. Francis Xavier	2	5	0	4	-
3	Saint Mary’s	0	1	4	3	-

Championship
1	New Brunswick	2	3	-
2	St. Francis Xavier	3	5	-

Note: * denotes overtime period(s)

== 2017 ==
Seed	School	Standings	Seed	School	Standings
1	New Brunswick	25–2–2–1	5	Prince Edward Island	11–15–2–2
2	Acadia	20–8–2–0	6	Moncton	10–17–3–0
3	St. Francis Xavier	16–12–2–0	7	Dalhousie	8–19–1–2
4	Saint Mary's	15–14–1–0			

Quarterfinals
3	St. Francis Xavier	6	4	-
6	Moncton	2	3	-
4	Saint Mary’s	5	2	4
5	Prince Edward Island	1	7	3

Semifinals
1	New Brunswick	5	7	2	2	-
4	Saint Mary’s	1	3	3	1	-
2	Acadia	3	2	4	-	-
3	St. Francis Xavier	4*	3	5*	-	-

Championship
1	New Brunswick	1	4	-
3	St. Francis Xavier	2	5	-
Third place
2	Acadia	5	3	-
4	Saint Mary’s	1	0	-

Note: * denotes overtime period(s)

== 2018 ==
Seed	School	Standings	Seed	School	Standings
1	New Brunswick	24–2–3–1	5	Prince Edward Island	11–18–1–0
2	St. Francis Xavier	22–4–1–3	6	Dalhousie	9–20–0–1
3	Acadia	18–10–1–1	7	Moncton	3–24–2–1
4	Saint Mary's	18–10–2–0			

Quarterfinals
3	Acadia	5	5	-
6	Dalhousie	2	2	-
4	Saint Mary’s	6	1	5
5	Prince Edward Island	2	2	2

Semifinals
1	New Brunswick	3*	1	6	-	-
4	Saint Mary’s	2	0	2	-	-
2	St. Francis Xavier	2	3	0	4	6
3	Acadia	4	0	1	3	5

Championship
1	New Brunswick	6	5	-
2	St. Francis Xavier	3	0	-
Third place
3	Acadia	6	2	6
4	Saint Mary’s	3	3	1

Note: * denotes overtime period(s)

== 2019 ==
Seed	School	Standings	Seed	School	Standings
1	New Brunswick	25–2–2–1	5	Moncton	14–12–3–1
2	Saint Mary's	19–10–1–0	6	Acadia	10–17–2–1
3	St. Francis Xavier	15–12–2–1	7	Dalhousie	7–22–0–1
4	Prince Edward Island	15–12–1–2			

Quarterfinals
3	St. Francis Xavier	5	2	4
6	Acadia	0	3*	1
4	Prince Edward Island	3*	4	-
5	Moncton	2	0	-

Semifinals
1	New Brunswick	3	2*	5	-	-
4	Prince Edward Island	1	1	0	-	-
2	Saint Mary’s	3	4	1	3	1
3	St. Francis Xavier	0	2	3	6	3

Championship
1	New Brunswick	5	7	-
3	St. Francis Xavier	1	1	-

Note: * denotes overtime period(s)

=== Quarterfinals ===
==== (3) St. Francis Xavier vs. (6) Acadia ====
February 13	St. Francis Xavier	5 – 0	Acadia	Antigonish Arena
05:42 – Holden Cook (1); 08:03 – Daniel Robertson (1)		First period	No scoring
13:13 – sh – Daniel Robertson (2)		Second period	No scoring
15:43 – Adam Laishram (1); 16:06 – Cole MacDonald (1)		Third period	No scoring
Chase Marchand (34 saves / 34 shots)		Goalie stats	Logan Flodell (26 saves / 31 shots)

February 15	Acadia	3 – 2	OT	St. Francis Xavier	Andrew H. McCain Arena
Kyle Farrell (1) – pp – 11:54		First period		No scoring
No scoring		Second period		19:46 – William Thompson (1)
Cristiano DiGiacinto (1) – pp – 18:10		Third period		05:25 – Daniel Robertson (3)
Cristiano DiGiacinto (2) – 03:06		First overtime period		No scoring
Logan Flodell (24 saves / 26 shots)		Goalie stats		Chase Marchand (54 saves / 57 shots)

February 17	St. Francis Xavier	4 – 1	Acadia	Antigonish Arena
Adam Stevens (1) – pp – 11:40		First period	No scoring
Sam Studnicka (1) – 09:37; Matthew Graham (1) – 11:02		Second period	05:03 – pp – Johnny Corneil (1)
Cole MacDonald (2) – 14:03		Third period	No scoring
Chase Marchand (41 saves / 42 shots)		Goalie stats	Logan Flodell (20 saves / 24 shots)

St. Francis Xavier wins series 2 – 1

==== (4) Prince Edward Island vs. (5) Moncton ====
February 14	Prince Edward Island	3 – 2	OT	Moncton	MacLauchlan Arena
No scoring		First period		Édouard Michaud (1) – 06:22
14:32 – sh – Nick Shumlanski (1); 16:05 – Gabe Guertler (1)		Second period		No scoring
No scoring		Third period		Ryan Chiasson (1) – 07:29
02:23 – Brent Andrews (1)		First overtime period		No scoring
Matthew Mancina (20 saves / 22 shots)		Goalie stats		Étienne Montpetit (27 saves / 30 shots)

February 16	Moncton	0 – 4	Prince Edward Island	Jean-Louis Lévesque Arena
No scoring		First period	12:47 – Gabe Guertler (2); 13:16 – Beau McCue (1); 14:09 – Riley Whittingham (1)
No scoring		Second period	No scoring
No scoring		Third period	19:53 – en – Gabe Guertler (3)
Étienne Montpetit (24 saves / 27 shots)		Goalie stats	Matthew Mancina (29 saves / 29 shots)

Prince Edward Island wins series 2 – 0

=== Semifinals ===
==== (1) New Brunswick vs. (4) Prince Edward Island ====
February 21	New Brunswick	3 – 1	Prince Edward Island	Aitken University Centre
No scoring		First period	No scoring
02:34 – Mark Rassell (1); 14:08 – Kris Bennett (1)		Second period	Kameron Kielly (1) – pp – 04:49
08:37 – Matthew Boucher (1)		Third period	No scoring
Alex Dubeau (24 saves / 25 shots)		Goalie stats	Matthew Mancina (52 saves / 55 shots)

February 22	New Brunswick	2 – 1	OT	Prince Edward Island	Aitken University Centre
05:58 – Mark Rassell (2)		First period		Kameron Kielly (2) – 00:51
No scoring		Second period		No scoring
No scoring		Third period		No scoring
06:17 – Mark Simpson (1)		First overtime period		No scoring
Alex Dubeau (21 saves / 22 shots)		Goalie stats		Matthew Mancina (45 saves / 47 shots)

February 25	Prince Edward Island	0 – 5	New Brunswick	Jean-Louis Lévesque Arena
No scoring		First period	Alexandre Goulet (1) – 09:41
No scoring		Second period	Kris Bennett (2) – 16:37; Mark Rassell (3) – ps – 18:39; Kris Bennett (3) – pp – 19:08
No scoring		Third period	Tyler Boland (1) – pp – 12:21
Matthew Mancina (12 saves / 13 shots); Simon Hofley (20 saves / 24 shots)		Goalie stats	Alex Dubeau (19 saves / 19 shots)

New Brunswick wins series 3 – 0

==== (2) Saint Mary’s vs. (3) St. Francis Xavier ====
February 21	Saint Mary's	3 – 0	St. Francis Xavier	Dauphinee Centre
No scoring		First period	No scoring
01:03 – Jake Coughler (1); 15:45 – Hunter Garlent (1)		Second period	No scoring
08:11 – Thomas Stavert (1)		Third period	No scoring
Éric Brassard (23 saves / 23 shots)		Goalie stats	Chase Marchand (31 saves / 34 shots)

February 23	Saint Mary's	4 – 2	St. Francis Xavier	Dauphinee Centre
01:11 – Anthony Repaci (1); 08:57 – Noah Zilbert (1)		First period	Regan Spears (1) – 06:25; Cole MacDonald (3) – pp – 16:37
No scoring		Second period	No scoring
10:04 – pp – Stephen Johnson (1); 15:10 – sh – Stephen Johnson (2)		Third period	No scoring
Éric Brassard (19 saves / 21 shots)		Goalie stats	Chase Marchand (39 saves / 43 shots)

February 25	St. Francis Xavier	3 – 1	Saint Mary's	Antigonish Arena
No scoring		First period	Logan DeNoble (1) – 13:19
03:10 – Regan Spears (2); 05:37 – Santino Centorame (1); 19:51 – pp – Adam Stevens (2)		Second period	No scoring
No scoring		Third period	No scoring
Chase Marchand (36 saves / 37 shots)		Goalie stats	Éric Brassard (23 saves / 26 shots)

February 27	St. Francis Xavier	6 – 3	Saint Mary's	Antigonish Arena
05:29 – pp – Mark Tremaine (1); 17:58 – Adam Stevens (3)		First period	Aaron Berisha (1) – 00:12; Aaron Berisha (2) – 09:34
07:36 – pp – Adam Holwell (1); 16:13 – Mark Tremaine (2)		Second period	No scoring
12:03 – Regan Spears (3); 19:15 – sh – en – Adam Stevens (4)		Third period	Dawson Theede (1) – 08:02
Chase Marchand (27 saves / 30 shots)		Goalie stats	Éric Brassard (28 saves / 33 shots)

March 1	Saint Mary's	1 – 3	St. Francis Xavier	Dauphinee Centre
No scoring		First period	William Bower (1) – 17:27
04:54 – Hunter Garlent (1)		Second period	Adam Laishram (2) – pp – 11:40
No scoring		Third period	Adam Holwell (2) – en – 18:44
Éric Brassard (24 saves / 26 shots)		Goalie stats	Chase Marchand (39 saves / 40 shots)

St. Francis Xavier wins series 3 – 2

=== Finals ===
==== (1) New Brunswick vs. (3) St. Francis Xavier ====
March 4	New Brunswick	5 – 1	St. Francis Xavier	Aitken University Centre
18:03 – Kris Bennett (4)		First period	No scoring
07:38 – Chris Clapperton (1); 14:34 – Matt Murphy (1)		Second period	Daniel Robertson (4) – pp – 13:58
07:12 – pp – Mark Rassell (4); 19:59 – Oliver Cooper (1)		Third period	No scoring
Alex Dubeau (9 saves / 10 shots)		Goalie stats	Chase Marchand (42 saves / 47 shots)

March 6	New Brunswick	7 – 1	St. Francis Xavier	Aitken University Centre
00:51 – Cameron Brace (1); 15:00 – pp – Olivier Leblanc (1); 17:51 – Tyler Boland (1)		First period	No scoring
04:34 – Oliver Cooper (2); 17:43 – Kris Bennett (5)		Second period	Mark Tremaine (3) – pp – 08:19
03:58 – Tyler Boland (2); 11:25 – Tyler Boland (3)		Third period	No scoring
Alex Dubeau (17 saves / 18 shots)		Goalie stats	Chase Marchand (27 saves / 34 shots)

New Brunswick wins series 2 – 0

== 2020 ==
Seed	School	Standings	Seed	School	Standings
1	New Brunswick	26–4–0–0	5	St. Francis Xavier	12–13–1–4
2	Acadia	19–9–0–2	6	Prince Edward Island	10–15–4–1
3	Saint Mary's	17–12–1–0	7	Dalhousie	8–19–1–2
4	Moncton	13–11–5–1			

Quarterfinals
3	Saint Mary’s	5	4**	-
6	Prince Edward Island	4	3	-
4	Moncton	3	4	-
5	St. Francis Xavier	2	2	-

Semifinals
1	New Brunswick	7	7	4	-	-
4	Moncton	2	3	1	-	-
2	Acadia	4	5	2	4	-
3	Saint Mary’s	1	2	6	2	-

Championship
1	New Brunswick	1	6	5
2	Acadia	3	0	1
Third place
3	Saint Mary’s	4	4*	-
4	Moncton	2	3	-

Note: * denotes overtime period(s)

== 2021 ==
Season cancelled due to COVID-19 pandemic

== 2022 ==
Seed	School	Standings	Seed	School	Standings
1	New Brunswick	21–3–0–0	5	Saint Mary's	10–11–1–1
2	St. Francis Xavier	17–5–1–1	6	Acadia	7–14–0–1
3	Dalhousie	11–11–1–0	7	Moncton	6–15–1–2
4	Prince Edward Island	9–9–3–1			

Note: Due to cancellations due to both weather and COVID, the full schedule was not played. Standings were decided by point percentage and all teams participated in the postseason.

Play-In
6	Acadia	2
7	Moncton	3*

Quarterfinals
3	Dalhousie	4	0	4
7	Moncton	3	3	5
4	Prince Edward Island	5	1	-
5	Saint Mary’s	6**	3	-

Semifinals
1	New Brunswick	2	2	-
7	Moncton	1	1	-
2	St. Francis Xavier	2*	3*	-
5	Saint Mary’s	1	2	-

Championship
1	New Brunswick	3
2	St. Francis Xavier	1

Note: * denotes overtime period(s)

=== Play-In ===
==== (6) Vancouver Giants vs. (7) Moncton ====
March 9	Acadia	2 – 3	OT	Moncton	Andrew H. McCain Arena
No scoring		First period		Alexandre Bernier (1) – 17:48
No scoring		Second period		Mika Cyr (1) – sh – 05:27
Peyton Hoyt (1) – pp – 06:14; Eric Henderson (1) – 11:32		Third period		No scoring
No scoring		First overtime period		Mika Cyr (2) – 00:20
Max Paddock (25 saves / 28 shots)		Goalie stats		Étienne Montpetit (28 saves / 30 shots)

=== Quarterfinals ===
==== (3) Dalhousie vs. (7) Moncton ====
March 11	Dalhousie	4 – 3	Moncton	Dalhousie University arena
17:16 – Logan O'Neil (1); 19:03 – Matt Green (1)		First period	Gabriel Vanier (1) – 13:41; Rémy Anglehart (1) – 19:46
04:51 – Connor Welsh (1); 07:42 – Shaun Miller (1)		Second period	Nathaël Roy (1) – pp – 11:28
No scoring		Third period	No scoring
Reilly Pickard (26 saves / 29 shots)		Goalie stats	Étienne Montpetit (29 saves / 33 shots)

March 13	Moncton	3 – 0	Dalhousie	Jean-Louis Lévesque Arena
No scoring		First period	No scoring
Maxime Boudreau (1) – pp – 01:05		Second period	No scoring
Olivier Desjardins (1) – 15:24; Édouard St-Laurent (1) – en – 17:32		Third period	No scoring
Étienne Montpetit (27 saves / 27 shots)		Goalie stats	Reilly Pickard (30 saves / 32 shots)

March 15	Dalhousie	4 – 5	Moncton	Dalhousie University arena
Brett Crossley (1) – 11:55		First period	15:21 – sh – Olivier-Luc Hache (1); 19:39 – Nathaël Roy (2)
Shaun Miller (2) – 09:02; Matt Green (2) – 13:28		Second period	06:48 – William Basque (1)
Chandler Yakimowicz (1) – pp – 18:09		Third period	Édouard St-Laurent (2) – 02:32; Édouard St-Laurent (3) – sh – 13:18
Reilly Pickard (31 saves / 36 shots)		Goalie stats	Étienne Montpetit (33 saves / 37 shots)

Moncton wins series 2 – 1

==== (4) Prince Edward Island vs. (5) Moncton ====
March 11	Prince Edward Island	5 – 6	2OT	Saint Mary’s	MacLauchlan Arena
00:15 – Troy Lajeunesse (1); 12:23 – Jaden Peca (1)		First period		Andrew Coxhead (1) – 05:04; Nathan Dunkley (1) – 07:36
16:50 – Kyle Maksimovich (1); 19:49 – Darian Pilon (1)		Second period		Andrew Coxhead (2) – pp – 11:16; Andrew Coxhead (3) – sh – 13:03
19:57 – pp – Kaleb Pearson (1)		Third period		Justin MacPherson (1) – 07:12
No scoring		Second overtime period		Logan DeNoble (1) – 08:26
Jonah Capriotti (27 saves / 33 shots)		Goalie stats		Justin Sumarah (39 saves / 44 shots)

March 13	Saint Mary’s	3 – 1	Prince Edward Island	Dauphinee Centre
Cedric Ralph (1) – 14:53		First period	04:57 – pp – T.J. Shea (1)
Sam King (1) – 03:38		Second period	No scoring
Jonathan Hampton (1) – 09:12		Third period	No scoring
Justin Sumarah (39 saves / 40 shots)		Goalie stats	Jonah Capriotti (24 saves / 27 shots)

Saint Mary’s wins series 2 – 0

=== Semifinals ===
==== (1) New Brunswick vs. (7) Moncton ====
March 18	New Brunswick	2 – 1	Moncton	MacLauchlan Arena
10:04 – Ryan Roth (1)		First period	Nathaël Roy (3) – 15:04
10:24 – pp – Brady Gilmour (1)		Second period	No scoring
No scoring		Third period	No scoring
Rylan Parenteau (15 saves / 16 shots)		Goalie stats	Étienne Montpetit (39 saves / 41 shots)

March 20	Moncton	1 – 2	New Brunswick	Dauphinee Centre
No scoring		First period	09:04 – Samuel Dove-McFalls (1)
No scoring		Second period	No scoring
Olivier-Luc Hache (2) – 06:33		Third period	15:25 – pp – Brady Gilmour (2)
Étienne Montpetit (22 saves / 23 shots); Émile Samson (11 saves / 12 shots)		Goalie stats	Rylan Parenteau (20 saves / 21 shots)

New Brunswick wins series 2 – 0

==== (2) St. Francis Xavier vs. (5) Saint Mary’s ====
March 18	St. Francis Xavier	2 – 1	OT	Saint Mary’s	Charles V. Keating Centre
No scoring		First period		No scoring
No scoring		Second period		No scoring
01:23 – Liam Hawel (1)		Third period		Dawson Theede (1) – 04:43
05:04 – Matthew Philip (1)		First overtime period		No scoring
Joseph Raaymakers (24 saves / 25 shots)		Goalie stats		Justin Sumarah (39 saves / 41 shots)

March 20	Saint Mary’s	2 – 3	OT	St. Francis Xavier	Dauphinee Centre
Walter Flower (1) – 04:06		First period		No scoring
Bradey Johnson (1) – 14:59		Second period		03:01 – Josh Nelson (1)
No scoring		Third period		09:55 – pp – Matthew Struthers (1)
No scoring		First overtime period		05:32 – Matthew Struthers (2)
Justin Sumarah (49 saves / 52 shots)		Goalie stats		Joseph Raaymakers (17 saves / 19 shots)

St. Francis Xavier wins series 2 – 0

=== Finals ===
==== (1) New Brunswick vs. (2) St. Francis Xavier ====
March 25	New Brunswick	3 – 1	St. Francis Xavier	MacLauchlan Arena
No scoring		First period	No scoring
11:20 – Ryan Roth (2)		Second period	Liam Hawel (2) – 19:58
03:20 – pp – Samuel Dove-McFalls (2); 19:48 – en – Isaac Nurse (1)		Third period	No scoring
Rylan Parenteau (13 saves / 14 shots)		Goalie stats	Joseph Raaymakers (26 saves / 28 shots)

== 2023 ==
Seed	School	Standings	Seed	School	Standings
1	New Brunswick	24–4–1–1	5	Acadia	11–16–2–1
2	Saint Mary's	20–9–1–0	6	Moncton	11–17–1–1
3	Prince Edward Island	17–10–2–1	7	Dalhousie	6–22–1–1
4	St. Francis Xavier	16–13–1–0			

Quarterfinals
3	Prince Edward Island	3	4	3
6	Moncton	4*	1	4**
4	St. Francis Xavier	3	1	-
5	Acadia	5	4	-

Semifinals
1	New Brunswick	8	7	1	4	-
6	Moncton	3	1	4	1	-
2	Saint Mary’s	7	2	1	2	-
3	Acadia	1	0	2*	0	-

Championship
1	New Brunswick	4	5	4
2	Saint Mary’s	2	6*	1

Note: * denotes overtime period(s)

== 2024 ==
Seed	School	Standings	Seed	School	Standings
1	New Brunswick	30–0–0–0	5	Prince Edward Island	12–14–1–3
2	Moncton	16–11–3–0	6	Acadia	9–16–2–3
3	St. Francis Xavier	16–13–1–0	7	Dalhousie	7–21–2–0
4	Saint Mary's	15–14–1–0			

Quarterfinals
3	St. Francis Xavier	4***	3****	-
6	Acadia	3	2	-
4	Saint Mary’s	4	2*	-
5	Prince Edward Island	3	1	-

Semifinals
1	New Brunswick	4	5	5	-	-
4	Saint Mary’s	1	2	1	-	-
2	Moncton	5	5	4	-	-
3	St. Francis Xavier	3	2	1	-	-

Championship
1	New Brunswick	3	3	-
2	Moncton	1	0	-

Note: * denotes overtime period(s)

== 2025 ==
Seed	School	Standings	Seed	School	Standings
1	New Brunswick	28–1–1–0	5	Acadia	14–14–1–1
2	Moncton	19–9–2–0	6	Prince Edward Island	9–19–0–2
3	Saint Mary's	17–11–2–0	7	Dalhousie	3–26–1–0
4	St. Francis Xavier	15–13–1–1			

Quarterfinals
3	Saint Mary's	3**	4	-
6	Prince Edward Island	2	1	-
4	St. Francis Xavier	1	4	-
5	Acadia	2	6	-

Semifinals
1	New Brunswick	5	7	4	-	-
4	Acadia	2	1	1	-	-
2	Moncton	9	2	3	5	5
3	Saint Mary's	2	3	7	1	3

Championship
1	New Brunswick	5	3	-
2	Moncton	3	2	-

== 2026 ==
Seed	School	Standings	Seed	School	Standings
1	New Brunswick	20–8–2–0	5	Prince Edward Island	17–13–0–0
2	Moncton	19–9–1–1	6	St. Francis Xavier	14–13–0–3
3	Acadia	17–8–1–4	7	Dalhousie	2–25–2–1
4	Saint Mary's	16–10–1–3			

Quarterfinals
3	Acadia	1	4	2
6	St. Francis Xavier	4	1	1
4	Saint Mary's	2	2	-
5	Prince Edward Island	5	3	-

Semifinals
1	New Brunswick	4	-	-	-	-
5	Prince Edward Island	1	-	-	-	-
2	Moncton	3	-	-	-	-
3	Acadia	1	-	-	-	-

Championship
-	-	-	-	-
-	-	-	-	-

Note: * denotes overtime period(s)

== Championships ==
School	Championships
New Brunswick	13
Moncton	3
Saint Mary's	3
St. Francis Xavier	3
Acadia	2
St. Thomas	1

== See also ==
- MIAA men's ice hockey tournament
- AUAA men's ice hockey tournament
