= St. Francis Xavier X-Men ice hockey =

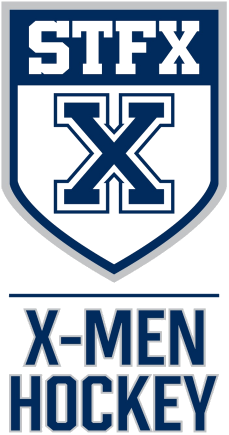
- University: St. Francis Xavier University
- Conference: AUS
- Head coach: Brad Peddle; Since 2005–06 season
- Arena: Charles V. Keating Millennium Centre; Antigonish, Nova Scotia
- Colors: Blue, White, and Silver

U Sports tournament champions
- 2004

U Sports tournament appearances
- 1963, 1966, 1967, 1968, 1976, 1978, 2001, 2003, 2004, 2007, 2011, 2015, 2016, 2017, 2018, 2019, 2022

Conference tournament champions
- 1924, 1926, 1927, 1928, 1929, 1936, 1937, 1941, 1943, 1944, 1946, 1950, 1951, 1952, 1954, 1955, 1956, 1957, 1958, 1959, 1963, 1968, 1976, 1978, 2004, 2016, 2017

The St. Francis Xavier X-Men ice hockey team is an ice hockey team representing the St. Francis Xavier X-Men athletics program of St. Francis Xavier University. The team is a member of the Atlantic University Sport conference and compete in U Sports. The team plays their home games at the Charles V. Keating Millennium Centre in Antigonish, Nova Scotia.

== History ==
St. Francis Xavier formed its first varsity ice hockey team in 1905. That season the X-Men competed with other local colleges for the inaugural Hewson Cup, donated by E.E. Hewson. Rules stipulated that the first team to win the trophy three times would be allowed to keep the cup. SFX proceeded to win the title in the first three years of contention and lay permanent claim to the trophy. A second trophy was made, called the Sumner Cup, however, due to St. Francis being accused of knowingly using ineligible players (despite no governing body or official eligibility rules at the time) SFX was not included in competition for the second trophy. After returning from World War I, the animus against St. Francis had ebbed and the X-Men were one of the founding member of a new intercollegiate conference, the Maritime Intercollegiate Athletic Association. St. Francis Xavier swiftly became one of the league's best teams and won several championships in the interwar years. SFX left the MIAA sometime in the early 30s but the team was still invited to participate in the conference tournament each year. During this time, St. Francis also played in a local senior league and competed for the Allan Cup on multiple occasions.

During World War II, St. Francis was one of three teams who attempted to play for the duration but the program was eventually forced to suspend operations in 1944. It returned after a 1-season break and became the dominant force in the MIAA. The X-Men won every single conference tournament from 1950 to 1959 (The 1953 tournament was cancelled due to a bleacher collapse) and were by far the best team of the maritime colleges. In 1954, the MIAA teams ended their senior hockey play and focused solely on the college level. When the CIAU championship began in 1963, SFX was the first entrant from MIAA but the X-Men had trouble winning on the national stage. Despite making 6 appearance in the first 15 years of competition, St. Francis Xavier failed to make an appearance in the finals.

At the beginning of the 1980s, the fortunes of the program changed and the once-lofty X-Men became a middling team at best for most of the next 15 years. St. Francis Xavier did not regain its former status until the late 90s. Even then, it wasn't until 2004 that the team won another league championship, however, that year also saw St. Francis win its first national championship. SFX has made several trips to the national tournament in the years since with their best finishes coming in 2016 and 2018 as runners-up (as of 2023).

== Season-by-season results ==
=== Senior and collegiate play ===
Note: GP = Games played, W = Wins, L = Losses, T = Ties, Pts = Points

U Sports Champion	U Sports Semifinalist	Conference regular season champions	Conference Division Champions	Conference Playoff Champions

Season	Conference	Regular Season											Conference Tournament Results	National Tournament Results
Season	Conference	Conference						Overall					Conference Tournament Results	National Tournament Results
Season	Conference	GP	W	L	T	Pts*	Finish	GP	W	L	T	%	Conference Tournament Results	National Tournament Results
Senior Hockey
1905–06	Independent	–	–	–	–	–	–	?	?	?	?	?	Hewson Cup Champion	
1906–07	Independent	–	–	–	–	–	–	?	?	?	?	?	Hewson Cup Champion	
1907–08	Independent	–	–	–	–	–	–	?	?	?	?	?	Hewson Cup Champion	
1908–09	Independent	–	–	–	–	–	–	?	?	?	?	?		
1909–10	Independent	–	–	–	–	–	–	?	?	?	?	?		
1910–11	Independent	–	–	–	–	–	–	?	?	?	?	?		
1911–12	Independent	–	–	–	–	–	–	?	?	?	?	?		
1912–13	Independent	–	–	–	–	–	–	?	?	?	?	?		
1913–14	Independent	–	–	–	–	–	–	?	?	?	?	?		
1914–15	Independent	–	–	–	–	–	–	?	?	?	?	?		
Program suspended due to World War I
Senior and Intercollegiate Hockey
1919–20	MIAA	?	?	?	?	?	?	?	?	?	?	?	Won Semifinal, ? (King's); Lost Championship, 3–8 (Acadia)	
1920–21	MIAA	2	1	1	0	2	T–3rd	?	?	?	?	?		
1921–22	MIAA	?	?	?	?	?	?	?	?	?	?	?	Lost Semifinal, 3–6 (Dalhousie)	
1922–23	MIAA	2	0	2	0	0	6th	?	?	?	?	?		
1923–24	MIAA	3	3	0	0	6	1st	?	?	?	?	?	Won Championship, 6–2 (Acadia)	
1924–25	MIAA	?	?	?	?	?	1st	?	?	?	?	?	Lost Championship, 4–5 (New Brunswick)	
1925–26	MIAA	3	0	0	0	6	1st	?	?	?	?	?	Won Semifinal, 2–0 (King's); Won Championship, 3–2 (New Brunswick)	
1926–27	MIAA	?	?	?	?	?	1st	?	?	?	?	?	Won Championship, 1–0 (Mount Allison)	
1927–28	MIAA	3	3	0	0	6	1st	?	?	?	?	?	Won Championship, 3–1 (New Brunswick)	
1928–29	MIAA	2	2	0	0	4	T–1st	?	?	?	?	?	Won Championship series, 10–5 (New Brunswick)	
1929–30	Independent	?	?	?	?	?	?	?	?	?	?	?	Won Quarterfinal, 3–2 (Acadia); Lost Semifinal, 1–3 (Saint Mary's)	
1930–31	Independent	?	?	?	?	?	?	?	?	?	?	?	Won Quarterfinal, 5–1 (Acadia); Won Semifinal, 3–2 (Saint Mary's); Lost Championship, 0–1 (Mount Allison)	
1931–32	Independent	?	?	?	?	?	?	?	?	?	?	?	Won Quarterfinal, 5–3 (Acadia); Won Semifinal, 4–1 (Saint Mary's); Lost Championship, 0–3 (Mount Allison)	
1932–33	Independent	?	?	?	?	?	?	?	?	?	?	?	Lost MIAA Quarterfinal, 1–5 (Acadia)	
1933–34	Independent	?	?	?	?	?	?	?	?	?	?	?	Lost MIAA Quarterfinal, 3–4 (Acadia)	
1934–35	Independent	?	?	?	?	?	?	?	?	?	?	?	Won Quarterfinal series, 7–5 (Saint Mary's); Won Semifinal, 5–2 (Acadia); Lost Championship, 2–3 (Mount Allison)	
1935–36	Independent	?	?	?	?	?	?	?	?	?	?	?	Won MIAA Quarterfinal series, 11–4 (Acadia); Won Semifinal, 9–3 (Saint Mary's); Won Championship, 3–2 (New Brunswick)	
1936–37	Independent	?	?	?	?	?	?	?	?	?	?	?	Won MIAA Semifinal, 5–3 (Dalhousie); Won Championship, 6–2 (Mount Allison)	
1937–38	Independent	?	?	?	?	?	?	?	?	?	?	?	Lost MIAA Semifinal, 4–5 (Acadia)	
1938–39	Independent	?	?	?	?	?	?	?	?	?	?	?	Lost MIAA Quarterfinal series, 4–5 (Acadia)	
1939–40	Independent	?	?	?	?	?	?	?	?	?	?	?		
1940–41	MIAA	3	2	1	0	4	?	?	?	?	?	?	Won Semifinal series, 11–10 (Saint Mary's); Won Championship, 4–3 (New Brunswick)	
1941–42	MIAA	?	?	?	?	?	?	?	?	?	?	?	Lost Semifinals series, 9–10 (Saint Mary's)	
1942–43	MIAA	?	?	?	?	?	?	?	?	?	?	?	Won Championship series, 14–7 (Saint Mary's)	
1943–44	MIAA	?	?	?	?	?	?	?	?	?	?	?	Won Championship, 6–3 (Acadia)	
Program suspended due to World War II
1945–46	MIAA	8	8	0	0	1.000	1st	?	?	?	?	?	Won Championship, forfeit (St. Joseph's)	
1946–47	MIAA	8	7	1	0	.875	1st	?	?	?	?	?	Lost Championship, 6–8 (Saint Dunstan's)	
1947–48	MIAA	7	5	2	0	.714	T–2nd	?	?	?	?	?	Lost Semifinal, 5–6 (Acadia)	
1948–49	MIAA	4	2	2	0	.500	2nd	?	?	?	?	?		
1949–50	MIAA	4	4	0	0	1.000	1st	?	?	?	?	?	Won Championship series, 13–6 (New Brunswick)	
1950–51	MIAA	3	3	0	0	1.000	1st	?	?	?	?	?	Won Championship series, 13–8 (St. Thomas)	
1951–52	MIAA	–	–	–	–	–	—	?	?	?	?	?	Won Championship series, 21–5 (New Brunswick)	
1952–53	MIAA	0	0	0	0	0	–	?	?	?	?	?	Won Semifinal series, ? (Acadia) no contest Championship series, cancelled (Mount Allison)	
1953–54	MIAA	0	0	0	0	0	–	?	?	?	?	?	Won Quarterfinal series, 15–5 (Dalhousie); Won Semifinal series, ? (Acadia); Won Championship series, 6–3 (Mount Allison)	
Totals								GP	W	L	T	%	Championships	
Regular Season								?	?	?	?	?	13 MIAA Division Championships, 10 MIAA Championships	
Conference Post-season								?	?	?	?	?	3 Hewson Cups, 15 MIAA Championships	
Regular Season and Postseason Record								?	?	?	?	?		

=== Collegiate only ===
Note: GP = Games played, W = Wins, L = Losses, T = Ties, OTL = Overtime Losses, SOL = Shootout Losses, Pts = Points

U Sports Champion	U Sports Semifinalist	Conference regular season champions	Conference Division Champions	Conference Playoff Champions

Season	Conference	Regular Season													Conference Tournament Results	National Tournament Results
Season	Conference	Conference								Overall					Conference Tournament Results	National Tournament Results
Season	Conference	GP	W	L	T	OTL	SOL	Pts*	Finish	GP	W	L	T	%	Conference Tournament Results	National Tournament Results
1954–55	MIAA	12	9	3	0	–	–	18	2nd	14	11	3	0	.786	Won Championship series, 17–1 (Mount Allison)	
1955–56	MIAA	8	8	0	0	–	–	16	T–1st	14	14	0	0	1.000	Won Quarterfinal series, 9–5 (Dalhousie); Won Semifinal series, 20–4 (Acadia); Won Championship series, 8–2 (Mount Allison)	
1956–57	MIAA	8	6	0	2	–	–	14	T–2nd	10	2	7	1	.250	Won Quarterfinal series, 17–0 (Acadia); Won Semifinal series, 5–4 (Dalhousie); Won Championship series, 15–6 (New Brunswick)	
1957–58	MIAA	8	8	0	0	–	–	16	T–1st	14	13	0	1	.964	Won Quarterfinal series, 22–2 (Acadia); Won Semifinal series, 18–4 (Dalhousie); Won Championship series, 10–8 (New Brunswick)	
1958–59	MIAA	8	5	2	1	–	–	11	4th	14	10	2	2	.786	Won Quarterfinal series, 9–1 (Nova Scotia Tech); Won Semifinal series, 7–4 (Dalhousie); Won Championship series, 10–1 (St. Thomas)	
1959–60	MIAA	8	6	2	0	–	–	12	2nd	14	13	0	1	.964	Won Quarterfinal series, 23–5 (Acadia); Won Semifinal series, 12–8 (Saint Mary's); Lost Championship series, 0–2 (New Brunswick)	
1960–61	MIAA	8	5	3	0	–	–	10	2nd	14	10	4	0	.714	Won Quarterfinal series, 13–5 (Nova Scotia Tech); Won Semifinal series, 13–3 (Saint Mary's); Lost Championship series, 10–13 (St. Thomas)	
1961–62	MIAA	7	6	0	1	–	–	13	1st	14	10	2	2	.786	Won Quarterfinal series, 9–8 (Nova Scotia Tech); Won Semifinal series, 18–5 (Acadia); Lost Championship series, 1–2 (New Brunswick)	
1962–63	MIAA	12	9	2	1	–	–	19	2nd	17	12	4	1	.735	Won Championship series, 2–1 (New Brunswick)	Lost Semifinal, 3–4 (McMaster); Won Third Place Game, 4–7 (Sherbrooke)
1963–64	MIAA	12	9	2	1	–	–	23	3rd	12	9	2	1	.792		
1964–65	MIAA	11	9	2	0	–	–	18	2nd	11	9	2	0	.818		
1965–66	MIAA	14	14	0	0	–	–	28	1st	16	15	1	0	.938		Lost Semifinal, 4–6 (Toronto); Won Third Place Game, 5–3 (Laurentian)
1966–67	MIAA	14	13	1	0	–	–	26	1st	16	14	2	0	.875		Lost Semifinal, 4–7 (Toronto); Won Third Place Game, 6–3 (Sir George Williams)
1967–68	MIAA	16	15	1	0	–	–	30	1st	20	17	3	0	.850	Won Semifinal, 2–1 (New Brunswick); Won Championship, 9–6 (Saint Mary's)	Lost Quarterfinal, 3–12 (Alberta); Lost Consolation Semifinal, 1–9 (Toronto)
1968–69	AIAA	18	9	8	1	–	–	19	6th	18	9	8	1	.528		
1969–70	AIAA	18	15	3	0	–	–	30	2nd	20	16	4	0	.800	Won Semifinal, 8–1 (New Brunswick); Lost Championship, 5–6 (Saint Mary's)	
1970–71	AIAA	18	14	4	0	–	–	28	3rd	19	14	5	0	.737	Lost Semifinal, 6–7 (Dalhousie)	
1971–72	AIAA	18	5	12	1	–	–	11	T–9th	18	5	12	1	.306		
1972–73	AIAA	21	9	12	0	–	–	.429	7th	21	9	12	0	.429		
1973–74	AUAA	21	14	7	0	–	–	.667	3rd	22	14	8	0	.636	Lost Semifinal, 1–5 (Moncton)	
1974–75	AUAA	18	11	7	0	–	–	22	5th	18	11	7	0	.611	Lost Semifinal, 1–5 (Moncton)	
1975–76	AUAA	16	12	4	0	–	–	24	T–2nd	20	15	5	0	.750	Won Semifinal, 9–4 (Mount Allison); Won Championship, 7–5 (Moncton)	Won East Regional Semifinal, 4–1 (Laval); Lost East Regional Final, 3–5 (Concordia)
1976–77	AUAA	20	16	2	2	–	–	34	1st	24	18	4	2	.792	Won Semifinal series, 2–0 (Prince Edward Island); Lost Championship series, 0–2 (Saint Mary's)	
1977–78	AUAA	20	13	4	3	–	–	29	2nd	29	19	7	3	.707	Won Semifinal series, 2–0 (Prince Edward Island); Won Championship series, 3–2 (Saint Mary's)	Lost Group 1 Round-Robin, 5–0 (Regina), 3–7 (Alberta)
1978–79	AUAA	20	10	9	1	–	–	21	5th	20	10	9	1	.525		
1979–80	AUAA	29	16	12	1	–	–	33	5th	33	18	14	1	.561	Won Quarterfinal, 7–4 (New Brunswick); Lost Semifinal series, 1–2 (Dalhousie)	
1980–81	AUAA	24	11	13	0	–	–	22	6th	24	11	13	0	.458		
1981–82	AUAA	26	6	17	3	–	–	15	8th	26	6	17	3	.288		
1982–83	AUAA	24	7	14	3	–	–	17	8th	24	7	14	3	.354		
1983–84	AUAA	24	10	14	0	–	–	20	7th	24	10	14	0	.417		
1984–85	AUAA	24	10	13	1	–	–	21	5th	24	10	13	1	.438		
1985–86	AUAA	25	16	9	0	–	–	.640	4th	27	16	11	0	.593	Lost Semifinal series, 0–2 (Moncton)	
1986–87	AUAA	25	15	10	0	–	–	.600	4th	30	17	13	0	.567	Won Semifinal series, 2–1 (Moncton); Lost Championship series, 0–2 (Prince Edward Island)	
1987–88	AUAA	26	18	6	2	–	–	38	T–2nd	29	19	8	2	.690	Lost Semifinal series, 1–2 (Moncton)	
1988–89	AUAA	26	4	22	0	–	–	8	10th	26	4	22	0	.154		
1989–90	AUAA	22	9	11	2	–	–	20	T–6th	24	9	13	2	.417	Lost Quarterfinal series, 0–2 (Dalhousie)	
1990–91	AUAA	26	10	12	4	–	–	24	7th	29	11	14	4	.448	Lost Division Semifinal series, 1–2 (Dalhousie)	
1991–92	AUAA	26	9	14	3	–	–	21	7th	28	9	16	3	.375	Lost Division Semifinal series, 0–2 (Acadia)	
1992–93	AUAA	26	7	19	0	–	–	14	9th	26	7	19	0	.269		
1993–94	AUAA	26	13	11	2	–	–	28	5th	28	13	13	2	.500	Lost Division Semifinal series, 0–2 (Acadia)	
1994–95	AUAA	26	9	16	1	–	–	19	8th	28	9	18	1	.339	Lost Division Semifinal series, 0–2 (Acadia)	
1995–96	AUAA	26	15	11	0	–	–	30	5th	28	15	13	0	.536	Lost Division Semifinal series, 0–2 (Dalhousie)	
1996–97	AUAA	28	18	8	2	–	–	38	3rd	31	19	10	2	.645	Lost Division Semifinal series, 1–2 (Dalhousie)	
1997–98	AUAA	28	18	8	2	1	–	39	2nd	33	20	11	2	.636	Won Quarterfinal series, 2–1 (Saint Mary's); Lost Semifinal series, 0–2 (Acadia)	
1998–99	AUS	26	14	10	2	0	–	30	T–2nd	31	17	12	2	.581	Won Quarterfinal series, 2–0 (Dalhousie); Lost Semifinal series, 1–2 (Acadia)	
1999–00	AUS	26	15	11	0	5	–	35	3rd	28	15	13	0	.536	Lost Quarterfinal series, 0–2 (Acadia)	
2000–01	AUS	28	17	8	3	2	–	39	1st	34	20	11	3	.632	Won Semifinal series, 2–1 (New Brunswick); Lost Championship series, 1–2 (St. Thomas)	Won Pool A Round-Robin, 5–2 (Western Ontario), 5–3 (Alberta); Lost Championship, 4–5 (Quebec–Trois-Rivières)
2001–02	AUS	28	9	10	6	3	–	27	6th	31	10	15	6	.419	Lost Quarterfinal series, 1–2 (Moncton)	
2002–03	AUS	28	14	12	2	0	–	30	3rd	40	21	17	2	.550	Won Quarterfinal series, 2–0 (Prince Edward Island); Won Semifinal series, 2–1 (Dalhousie); Lost Championship series, 1–3 (New Brunswick)	Won Pool A Round-Robin, 3–2 (Alberta), 5–3 (York); Lost Championship, 0–3 (Quebec–Trois-Rivières)
2003–04	AUS	28	19	6	3	0	–	41	1st	37	27	7	3	.770	Won Semifinal series, 2–1 (St. Thomas); Won Championship series, 3–0 (Dalhousie)	Won Pool B Round-Robin, 5–0 (Dalhousie), 4–0 (York); Won Championship, 3–2 (2OT) (New Brunswick)
2004–05	AUS	28	11	10	6	1	–	29	5th	30	11	13	6	.467	Lost Quarterfinal series, 0–2 (New Brunswick)	
2005–06	AUS	28	13	11	1	3	–	30	6th	31	14	16	1	.468	Lost Quarterfinal series, 1–2 (New Brunswick)	
2006–07	AUS	28	16	9	–	3	–	35	3rd	36	19	17	0	.528	Won Quarterfinal series, 2–0 (Acadia); Lost Semifinal series, 1–3 (New Brunswick)	Lost Pool B Round-Robin, 3–4 (Wilfrid Laurier), 3–5 (Moncton)
2007–08	AUS	28	12	12	–	4	–	28	T–4th	31	13	18	0	.419	Lost Quarterfinal series, 1–2 (St. Thomas)	
2008–09	AUS	28	15	11	–	2	–	32	4th	30	15	15	0	.500	Lost Quarterfinal series, 0–2 (Acadia)	
2009–10	AUS	28	11	12	–	5	–	27	5th	36	16	20	0	.444	Won Quarterfinal series, 2–0 (Prince Edward Island); Won Semifinal series, 3–0 (New Brunswick); Lost Championship series, 0–3 (Saint Mary's)	
2010–11	AUS	28	17	10	–	1	–	35	3rd	42	25	17	0	.595	Won Quarterfinal series, 2–0 (Dalhousie); Won Semifinal series, 3–2 (Saint Mary's); Lost Championship series, 2–3 (New Brunswick)	Lost Pool A Round-Robin, 1–2 (McGill), 3–1 (Alberta)
2011–12	AUS	28	10	14	–	4	–	24	6th	31	11	20	0	.355	Lost Quarterfinal series, 1–2 (Moncton)	
2012–13	AUS	28	16	10	–	2	0	34	4th	31	17	14	0	.548	Lost Quarterfinal series, 1–2 (Prince Edward Island)	
2013–14	AUS	28	12	13	–	2	1	27	6th	30	12	17	1	.417	Lost Quarterfinal series, 0–2 (Moncton)	
2014–15	AUS	28	17	9	–	1	1	36	4th	36	21	14	1	.597	Won Quarterfinal series, 2–0 (Prince Edward Island); Lost Semifinal series, 2–3 (New Brunswick)	Lost Quarterfinal, 1–5 (Alberta)
2015–16	AUS	28	18	6	–	4	0	40	T–2nd	37	25	12	0	.676	Won Semifinal series, 3–1 (Saint Mary's); Won Championship series, 2–0 (New Brunswick)	Won Quarterfinal, 6–2 (Alberta); Won Semifinal, 3–2 (3OT) (Saskatchewan); Lost Championship, 1–3 (New Brunswick)
2016–17	AUS	30	16	12	–	2	0	34	3rd	35	22	13	0	.629	Won Quarterfinal series, 2–0 (Moncton); Won Semifinal series, 3–0 (Acadia); Won Championship series, 2–0 (New Brunswick)	Won Quarterfinal, 4–1 (McGill); Lost Semifinal, 0–8 (Saskatchewan); Lost Bronze Medal game, 3–7 (Acadia)
2017–18	AUS	30	22	4	–	1	3	48	2nd	40	27	10	3	.713	Won Semifinal series, 3–2 (Acadia); Lost Championship series, 0–2 (New Brunswick)	Won Quarterfinal, 6–2 (Brock); Won Semifinal, 5–4 (OT) (New Brunswick); Lost Championship, 2–4 (Alberta)
2018–19	AUS	30	15	12	–	2	1	33	3rd	33	22	20	1	.682	Won Quarterfinal series, 2–1 (Acadia); Won Semifinal series, 3–2 (Saint Mary's); Lost Championship series, 0–2 (New Brunswick)	Won Quarterfinal, 5–3 (Queen's); Lost Semifinal, 1–9 (New Brunswick); Won Bronze Medal game, 5–1 (Saskatchewan)
2019–20	AUS	30	12	13	–	1	4	29	5th	32	12	16	4	.438	Lost Quarterfinal series, 0–2 (Moncton)	
2020–21	Season cancelled due to COVID-19 pandemic															
2021–22	AUS	24	17	5	–	1	1	36	2nd	33	22	10	1	.682	Won Semifinal series, 2–0 (Saint Mary's); Lost Championship, 1–3 (New Brunswick)	Won Quarterfinal, 3–0 (Brock); Lost Semifinal, 3–7 (Alberta); Won Bronze Medal game, 3–2 (OT) (Ryerson)
2022–23	AUS	30	16	13	–	1	0	33	4th	32	16	16	0	.500	Lost Quarterfinal series, 0–2 (Acadia)	
2023–24	AUS	30	16	13	–	1	0	33	3rd	35	18	17	0	.514	Won Quarterfinal series, 2–0 (Acadia); Lost Semifinal semifinal, 0–3 (Moncton)	
Totals										GP	W	L	T/SOL	%	Championships	
Regular Season										1545	841	630	74	.568	7 East Division Titles, 3 Kelly Division Titles, 6 MIAA Championships, 1 AUAA Championships, 2 AUS Championships	
Conference Post-season										207	114	90	3	.558	7 MIAA Championships, 2 AUAA Championships, 3 AUS Championships	
U Sports Postseason										41	22	19	0	.537	17 National tournament appearances	
Regular Season and Postseason Record										1793	977	739	77	.566	1 National Championship	

Note: Totals include results from 1954–55 onward.

== See also ==
St. Francis Xavier X-Women ice hockey
