= Fred McLean =

Canadian ice hockey player

- Born: March 16, 1893 Lakeville, New Brunswick, Canada
- Died: November 18, 1971 (aged 78)
- Height: 6 ft 2 in (188 cm)
- Weight: 201 lb (91 kg; 14 st 5 lb)
- Position: Defence
- Shot: Right
- Played for: Hamilton Tigers; Quebec Bulldogs
- Playing career: 1910–1921

Frederick Ferguson McLean (March 16, 1893 — November 18, 1971) was a Canadian ice hockey defenceman. He played 8 games between 1919 and 1921 with the Quebec Bulldogs and Hamilton Tigers of the National Hockey League, while the rest of his career was spent mainly as an amateur player in New Brunswick and Nova Scotia.

== Career statistics ==
=== Regular season and playoffs ===
| | | | Regular season | | | | | Playoffs |
| Season | Team | League | GP | G | A | Pts | PIM | GP | G | A | Pts | PIM |
|---|---|---|---|---|---|---|---|---|---|---|---|---|
| 1908–09 | Fredericton Capitals | YCHL | 4 | 4 | 0 | 4 | 5 | 1 | 0 | 0 | 0 | 0 |
| 1910–11 | Fredericton Capitals | NBSHL | 6 | 3 | 0 | 3 | 13 | 3 | 1 | 0 | 1 | 3 |
| 1911–12 | Fredericton Capitals | NSHL | 2 | 2 | 0 | 2 | 0 | 1 | 1 | 0 | 1 | 0 |
| 1912–13 | Fredericton Capitals | YCHL | 5 | 11 | 0 | 11 | 5 | 3 | 6 | 0 | 6 | 18 |
| 1912–13 | Chatham Ironmen | Exhib | 4 | 3 | 0 | 3 | 0 | — | — | — | — | — |
| 1913–14 | University of New Brunswick | MIHL | 3 | 5 | 0 | 5 | 12 | — | — | — | — | — |
| 1913–14 | Fredericton Capitals | Exhib | 2 | 4 | 0 | 4 | 5 | — | — | — | — | — |
| 1914–15 | Sydney Millionaires | EPHL | 8 | 8 | 0 | 8 | 19 | — | — | — | — | — |
| 1915–16 | Maine Island Falls | NESHL | — | — | — | — | — | — | — | — | — | — |
| 1916–17 | Boston Arenas | Exhib | — | — | — | — | — | — | — | — | — | — |
| 1917–18 | Sydney Millionaires | CBHL | 6 | 8 | 7 | 15 | 8 | 6 | 2 | 4 | 6 | 3 |
| 1918–19 | Sydney Millionaires | CBHL | — | — | — | — | — | — | — | — | — | — |
| 1919–20 | Glace Bay Miners | CBHL | 4 | 7 | 4 | 11 | — | 2 | 2 | 2 | 4 | 2 |
| 1919–20 | Quebec Bulldogs | NHL | 7 | 0 | 0 | 0 | 2 | — | — | — | — | — |
| 1920–21 | Hamilton Tigers | NHL | 1 | 0 | 0 | 0 | 0 | — | — | — | — | — |
| 1920–21 | Fredericton Capitals | SNBHL | 3 | 2 | 0 | 2 | 10 | 2 | 2 | 0 | 2 | 6 |
| NHL totals | | | 8 | 0 | 0 | 0 | 2 | — | — | — | — | — |
