= St. Thomas Tommies (Canada) men's ice hockey =

St. Thomas Tommies men's ice hockey
- University: St. Thomas University
- Conference: AUS
- First season: 1916 (folded in 2016)
- Arena: Fredericton, New Brunswick
- Colors: Green and Gold

U Sports tournament appearances
- 2001

Conference tournament champions
- 1961, 2001

The St. Thomas Tommies men's ice hockey team was an ice hockey team representing the St. Thomas Tommies athletics program of St. Thomas University. The team was a member of the Atlantic University Sport conference and competed in U Sports. The program was discontinued in 2016 due to budget constraints.

== History ==
St. Thomas fielded an ice hockey squad at least as early as 1916, however, the sparse records do not indicate whether or not this was a varsity team. The records for an official squad do not begin until the Tommies joined the Maritime Intercollegiate Athletic Association in 1937. In the early years, the team found itself lagging behind its contemporaries, however, the team's situation changed after returning following World War II. St. Thomas steadily improved throughout the 1950s and won its first regular season title in '59. Two years later, the Tommies captured their first league championship.

Unfortunately, the team was unable to sustain their success and began slipping down the standings afterwards. By the mid-70s, St. Thomas was playing so poorly that they won just 2 games over a 3-year span. The team suspended operations in 1975 but returned four years later, hoping that the time off could do them some good. For the first half of the 1980s, little appeared to have changed for the Tommies; the team routinely finished at the bottom of the standings and couldn't get a sniff of the postseason. The team was finally able to put together a winning season in 1986 and, three years later, made its first playoff appearance in nearly 20 years. That season saw the Tommies come achingly close to making their first appearance in the national tournament but a loss in the conference championship put those dreams on hold. Over the succeeding decade, the Tommies were mostly a mediocre team in their conference but they began to raise their level of play at the end of the 90s. After a few near misses, St. Thomas was finally able to win a second conference championship in 2001. The squad was quickly bounced from the national tournament, losing both round-robin games, and then finished last in the standings the following year.

Hopes were renewed in 2003 when St. Thomas won a regular season title but they were upset in the Semifinal round. The program declined afterwards, sinking to the bottom of the conference by 2010. Over a 7-year span, St. Thomas finished last every season save one and didn't make a single postseason appearance. With little hope on the horizon, the school's administration decided to end the program and invest the money elsewhere. At the time the team was running a deficit of approximately $250,000 per year with little to show for the price tag. Dawn Russell, the then-university president, reasoned that funding a competitive ice hockey team was beyond the means of the school.

Throughout its history, the program had three players that would go on to play in the NHL: Kevin MacDonald, Yannick Tremblay, and Patrick Bordeleau. Former NHL player Al MacAdam was head coach of the program from 1987-1997, while former NHL player Mike Eagles was head coach from 2002-2011.

== Season-by-season results ==
=== Senior and collegiate play ===
Note: GP = Games played, W = Wins, L = Losses, T = Ties, Pts = Points

U Sports Champion	U Sports Semifinalist	Conference regular season champions	Conference Division Champions	Conference Playoff Champions

Season	Conference	Regular Season											Conference Tournament Results	National Tournament Results
Season	Conference	Conference						Overall					Conference Tournament Results	National Tournament Results
Season	Conference	GP	W	L	T	Pts*	Finish	GP	W	L	T	%	Conference Tournament Results	National Tournament Results
1937–38	MIAA	4	1	3	0	2	?	?	?	?	?	?		
1938–39	MIAA	6	0	6	0	0	?	?	?	?	?	?		
1939–40	MIAA	6	1	4	1	3	?	?	?	?	?	?		
Program suspended due to World War II
1946–47	MIAA	0	0	0	0	–	–	?	?	?	?	?	won Quarterfinal series, 14–12 (New Brunswick) lost Semifinal series, 10–13 (Saint Dunstan's)	
1947–48	MIAA	4	1	3	0	.250	7th	?	?	?	?	?		
1948–49	MIAA	0	0	0	0	–	–	?	?	?	?	?	won Quarterfinal series, 13–11 (Saint Dunstan's) lost Semifinal series, 5–11 (New Brunswick)	
1949–50	MIAA	6	2	2	2	.500	T–3rd	?	?	?	?	?		
1950–51	MIAA	0	0	0	0	–	–	?	?	?	?	?	won Quarterfinal series, 16–9 (Saint Dunstan's) won Semifinal series, 13–7 (New Brunswick); Lost Championship series, 8–13 (St. Francis Xavier)	
1951–52	MIAA	–	–	–	–	–	—	?	?	?	?	?	no contest Quarterfinal series, withdrew (Saint Dunstan's)	
1952–53	MIAA	0	0	0	0	0	–	?	?	?	?	?	won Quarterfinal series, 7–4 (New Brunswick) lost Semifinal series, 5–13 (Mount Allison)	
1953–54	MIAA	0	0	0	0	0	–	?	?	?	?	?	Lost Quarterfinal series, 9–10 (New Brunswick)	
Totals								GP	W	L	T	%	Championships	
Regular Season								?	?	?	?	?		
Conference Post-season								?	?	?	?	?		
Regular Season and Postseason Record								?	?	?	?	?		

=== Collegiate only ===
Note: GP = Games played, W = Wins, L = Losses, T = Ties, OTL = Overtime Losses, SOL = Shootout Losses, Pts = Points

U Sports Champion	U Sports Semifinalist	Conference regular season champions	Conference Division Champions	Conference Playoff Champions

Season	Conference	Regular Season													Conference Tournament Results	National Tournament Results
Season	Conference	Conference								Overall					Conference Tournament Results	National Tournament Results
Season	Conference	GP	W	L	T	OTL	SOL	Pts*	Finish	GP	W	L	T	%	Conference Tournament Results	National Tournament Results
1954–55	MIAA	6	3	2	1	–	–	7	3rd	6	3	2	1	.583		
1955–56	MIAA	6	4	2	0	–	–	8	T–3rd	6	4	2	0	.667		
1956–57	MIAA	6	0	6	0	–	–	0	T–8th	6	0	6	0	.000		
Program suspended
1958–59	MIAA	6	5	0	1	–	–	11	1st	10	8	1	1	.850	Won Semifinal series, 16–5 (Mount Allison); Lost Championship series, 1–10 (St. Francis Xavier)	
1959–60	MIAA	6	5	1	0	–	–	10	1st	8	5	3	0	.625	Lost Semifinal series, 5–11 (New Brunswick)	
1960–61	MIAA	6	3	3	0	–	–	6	T–5th	10	5	4	1	.550	Won Semifinal series, 4–3 (Mount Allison); Won Championship series, 13–10 (St. Francis Xavier)	
1961–62	MIAA	6	4	1	1	–	–	9	3rd	8	5	2	1	.688	Lost Semifinal series, 6–7 (New Brunswick)	
1962–63	MIAA	11	6	3	2	–	–	14	3rd	11	6	3	2	.636		
1963–64	MIAA	11	7	4	0	–	–	14	4th	11	7	4	0	.636		
1964–65	MIAA	11	6	5	0	–	–	12	4th	11	6	5	0	.545		
1965–66	MIAA	14	5	8	1	–	–	11	5th	14	5	8	1	.393		
1966–67	MIAA	13	3	10	0	–	–	6	7th	13	3	10	0	.231		
1967–68	MIAA	16	8	7	1	–	–	17	5th	16	8	7	1	.531		
1968–69	AIAA	18	11	6	1	–	–	23	4th	20	12	7	1	.625	Won Semifinal, 4–2 (Saint Dunstan's); Lost Championship, 2–4 (Saint Mary's)	
1969–70	AIAA	18	10	7	1	–	–	21	4th	19	10	8	1	.553	Lost Semifinal, 1–7 (Saint Mary's)	
1970–71	AIAA	17	3	14	0	–	–	6	9th	17	3	14	0	.176		
1971–72	AIAA	18	5	11	2	–	–	12	8th	18	5	11	2	.333		
1972–73	AIAA	20	1	19	0	–	–	.050	10th	20	1	19	0	.050		
1973–74	AUAA	20	0	20	0	–	–	.000	10th	20	0	20	0	.000		
1974–75	AUAA	18	1	17	0	–	–	2	10th	18	1	17	0	.056		
Program suspended
1979–80	AUAA	27	4	23	0	–	–	8	9th	27	4	23	0	.148		
1980–81	AUAA	21	8	13	0	–	–	16	9th	21	8	13	0	.381		
1981–82	AUAA	26	0	24	2	–	–	2	10th	26	0	24	2	.038		
1982–83	AUAA	24	4	19	1	–	–	9	9th	24	4	19	1	.188		
1983–84	AUAA	24	4	20	0	–	–	8	8th	24	4	20	0	.167		
1984–85	AUAA	24	4	19	1	–	–	9	9th	24	4	19	1	.188		
1985–86	AUAA	24	14	10	0	–	–	.583	5th	24	14	10	0	.583		
1986–87	AUAA	24	7	17	0	–	–	.292	7th	24	7	17	0	.292		
1987–88	AUAA	26	6	20	0	–	–	12	8th	26	6	20	0	.231		
1988–89	AUAA	26	17	9	0	–	–	34	T–4th	34	21	13	0	.618	Won Quarterfinal series, 2–1 (Prince Edward Island); Won Semifinal series, 2–1 (Acadia); Lost Championship series, 0–2 (Moncton)	
1989–90	AUAA	21	10	11	0	–	–	20	T–6th	24	11	13	0	.458	Lost Quarterfinal series, 1–2 (Moncton)	
1990–91	AUAA	26	10	14	2	–	–	22	8th	28	10	16	2	.393	Lost Division Semifinal series, 0–2 (Prince Edward Island)	
1991–92	AUAA	26	11	14	1	–	–	23	5th	28	11	16	1	.411	Lost Division Semifinal series, 0–2 (Prince Edward Island)	
1992–93	AUAA	26	11	13	2	–	–	24	6th	28	11	15	2	.429	Lost Division Semifinal series, 0–2 (Moncton)	
1993–94	AUAA	26	14	11	1	–	–	29	4th	29	15	13	1	.534	Lost Division Semifinal series, 1–2 (Moncton)	
1994–95	AUAA	26	11	12	3	–	–	25	6th	31	13	15	3	.468	won Division Semifinal series, 2–1 (New Brunswick); Lost Division Final series, 0–2 (Moncton)	
1995–96	AUAA	26	19	6	1	–	–	39	T–1st	29	20	8	1	.707	Lost Division Semifinal series, 1–2 (Moncton)	
1996–97	AUAA	28	14	11	3	–	–	31	4th	32	16	13	3	.547	won Division Semifinal series, 2–0 (Prince Edward Island); Lost Division Final series, 0–2 (New Brunswick)	
1997–98	AUAA	28	14	11	3	1	–	32	4th	32	16	13	3	.547	Won Quarterfinal series, 2–0 (Moncton); Lost Semifinal series, 0–2 (New Brunswick)	
1998–99	AUS	26	14	9	3	2	–	33	1st	30	16	11	3	.583	Won Quarterfinal series, 2–0 (Prince Edward Island); Lost Semifinal series, 0–2 (Moncton)	
1999–00	AUS	26	18	8	0	2	–	38	2nd	31	21	10	0	.677	Won Quarterfinal series, 2–0 (Prince Edward Island); Lost Semifinal series, 1–2 (New Brunswick)	
2000–01	AUS	28	16	8	4	1	–	37	2nd	36	20	12	4	.611	Won Semifinal series, 2–1 (Dalhousie); Won Championship series, 2–1 (St. Francis Xavier)	Lost Pool B Round-Robin, 1–6 (Quebec–Trois-Rivières), 2–3 (Wilfrid Laurier)
2001–02	AUS	28	7	18	2	1	–	17	8th	28	7	19	2	.286		
2002–03	AUS	28	16	7	5	0	–	37	1st	31	17	9	5	.629	Lost Semifinal series, 1–2 (New Brunswick)	
2003–04	AUS	28	11	13	2	2	–	26	6th	34	14	18	2	.441	Won Semifinal series, 2–1 (Saint Mary's); Lost Semifinal series, 1–2 (St. Francis Xavier)	
2004–05	AUS	28	9	17	2	0	–	20	8th	28	9	17	2	.357		
2005–06	AUS	28	14	9	2	3	–	33	5th	31	15	14	2	.516	Lost Quarterfinal series, 1–2 (Saint Mary's)	
2006–07	AUS	28	14	14	–	0	–	28	5th	34	16	18	0	.471	Won Quarterfinal series, 2–1 (Saint Mary's); Lost Semifinal series, 0–3 (Moncton)	
2007–08	AUS	28	11	11	–	6	–	28	T–4th	34	13	21	0	.382	Won Quarterfinal series, 2–1 (St. Francis Xavier); Lost Semifinal series, 0–3 (New Brunswick)	
2008–09	AUS	28	8	16	–	4	–	20	7th	28	8	20	0	.286		
2009–10	AUS	28	7	19	–	2	–	16	8th	28	7	21	0	.250		
2010–11	AUS	28	3	21	–	4	–	10	8th	28	3	25	0	.107		
2011–12	AUS	28	5	18	–	5	–	15	8th	28	5	23	0	.179		
2012–13	AUS	28	3	24	–	1	0	7	8th	28	3	24	1	.125		
2013–14	AUS	28	6	20	–	2	0	14	7th	28	6	22	0	.214		
2014–15	AUS	28	2	22	–	4	1	9	8th	28	2	26	0	.071		
2015–16	AUS	28	2	25	–	0	1	5	8th	28	2	25	1	.089		
Totals										GP	W	L	T/SOL	%	Championships	
Regular Season										1226	438	736	52	.378	3 West Division Titles, 3 MacAdam Division Titles, 2 MIAA Championships, 1 AUAA Championships, 2 AUS Championships	
Conference Post-season										90	38	50	2	.433	1 MIAA Championship, 1 AUS Championship	
U Sports Postseason										2	0	2	0	.000	1 National tournament appearance	
Regular Season and Postseason Record										1318	476	788	54	.382		

Note: Totals include results from 1954–55 onward.

== See also ==
St. Thomas Tommies (Canada) women's ice hockey
