= Antigonish Arena =

Multi-purpose arena in Antigonish, Nova Scotia

Coordinates: 45°36′59.6″N 62°0′8.1″W

Antigonish Arena is a 2,290-seat multi-purpose arena in Antigonish, Nova Scotia, Canada. It is home to the Junior B Antigonish Bulldogs hockey team. The arena was home to the St. Francis Xavier X-Men and X-Women hockey teams before they moved into a new on-campus arena.
