= Laval Rouge et Or men's ice hockey =

- University: Université Laval
- Arena: Laval, Quebec
- Colors: Red, Gold, and Black

U Sports tournament appearances
- 1976

Conference regular season champions
- 1954, 1960, 1961, 1969

The Laval Rouge et Or men's ice hockey team was an ice hockey team representing the Laval Rouge et Or athletics program of the Université Laval. The program played its first games shortly after World War II and survived until 1983.

== History ==
Laval's first team was fielded immediately after World War II, playing a handful of games in the Senior Intercollegiate League (SIL). The circuit included four teams that were outside the Canadian Intercollegiate Athletic Union (CIAU), the main conference for Canadian college hockey. Unfortunately, the league did not prove to be successful and was abandoned after just one year. Five years later, Laval returned to the ice as a member of the CIAU, joining its former sister school, Montreal. Predictably, the team had a poor showing in its first season, however, the Rouge et Or swiftly acclimated to the pace of play and steadily climbed up the ranks. Within 4 years, the club had won its first league championship and then won back-to-back titles at the beginning of the 1960s. The Rouge et Or remained one of the better teams in the conference for much of the 60s but they were never able to reach the same heights.

In 1971, Canadian college hockey was drastically reorganized. The four conferences that were spread across Ontario and Quebec were broken up with the teams realigned into two provincial leagues. Laval, however, chose not to take part in the new Quebec Universities Athletic Association (QUAA) and suspended their hockey program. The team remained dormant for four years before returning in 1975. Financial problems plagued the club in their new conference, forcing the team to suspend operations for the entire 1977–78 season. The year off didn't seem to hamper the club on the ice as Laval reached the playoffs in four of the succeeding five seasons. Unfortunately, the club proved to be too costly for the university to continue to operate and the team was shuttered after a 2nd-place finish in 1983.

== Season-by-season results ==
=== Senior and collegiate play ===
Note: GP = Games played, W = Wins, L = Losses, T = Ties, Pts = Points

Extra-League Champion	U Sports Semifinalist	Conference regular season champions	Conference Division Champions	Conference Playoff Champions

Season	Conference	Regular Season											Conference Tournament Results	National Tournament Results
Season	Conference	Conference						Overall					Conference Tournament Results	National Tournament Results
Season	Conference	GP	W	L	T	Pts*	Finish	GP	W	L	T	%	Conference Tournament Results	National Tournament Results
Senior and Collegiate Hockey
1945–46	SIL	6	3	2	1	7	3rd	?	?	?	?	?		
Program suspended
1950–51	CIAU	6	0	4	2	2	4th	?	?	?	?	?		
1951–52	CIAU	12	7	5	0	14	T–2nd	?	?	?	?	?		
1952–53	CIAU	12	6	4	2	14	2nd	?	?	?	?	?		
1953–54	CIAU/QOAA ^{¿}	12	8	3	1	17	1st	?	?	?	?	?		
Totals								GP	W	L	T	%	Championships	
Regular Season								?	?	?	?	?	1 CIAU Championship	
Conference Post-season								?	?	?	?	?		
Regular Season and Postseason Record								?	?	?	?	?		

¿ Sometime between 1953 and 1955 the CIAU changed their name to QOAA (Quebec-Ontario Athletic Association).

=== Collegiate only ===
Note: GP = Games played, W = Wins, L = Losses, T = Ties, OTL = Overtime Losses, SOL = Shootout Losses, Pts = Points

U Sports Champion	U Sports Semifinalist	Conference regular season champions	Conference Division Champions	Conference Playoff Champions

Season	Conference	Regular Season													Conference Tournament Results	National Tournament Results
Season	Conference	Conference								Overall					Conference Tournament Results	National Tournament Results
Season	Conference	GP	W	L	T	OTL	SOL	Pts*	Finish	GP	W	L	T	%	Conference Tournament Results	National Tournament Results
1954–55	QOAA	12	2	10	0	–	–	4	4th	12	2	10	0	.167		
1955–56	QOAA	12	7	5	0	–	–	14	2nd	12	7	5	0	.583		
1956–57	QOAA	12	4	8	0	–	–	8	T–3rd	12	4	8	0	.333		
1957–58	QOAA	12	5	7	0	–	–	10	3rd	12	5	7	0	.417		
1958–59	QOAA	12	8	3	1	–	–	17	2nd	12	8	3	1	.708		
1959–60	QOAA	14	13	1	0	–	–	26	1st	14	13	1	0	.929		
1960–61	QOAA	12	9	3	0	–	–	18	1st	12	9	3	0	.750		
1961–62	QOAA	12	5	7	0	–	–	10	5th	12	5	7	0	.417		
1962–63	QOAA	12	9	3	0	–	–	18	2nd	14	9	5	0	.643	Lost Championship series, 7–12 (McMaster)	
1963–64	QOAA	12	5	5	2	–	–	12	T–4th	12	5	5	2	.500		
1964–65	QOAA	16	7	7	2	–	–	16	5th	16	7	7	2	.500		
1965–66	QOAA	16	9	6	1	–	–	19	4th	16	9	6	1	.594		
1966–67	QOAA	16	5	9	2	–	–	12	T–6th	16	5	9	2	.375		
1967–68	QOAA	16	7	8	1	–	–	15	6th	16	7	8	1	.469		
1968–69	QOAA	15	12	3	0	–	–	24	T–1st	16	12	4	0	.750	Lost Semifinal, 2–4 (Waterloo)	
1969–70	QOAA	14	8	6	0	–	–	18	5th	14	8	6	0	.571		
1970–71	QOAA	15	7	5	3	–	–	17	T–5th	15	7	5	3	.567		
Program suspended
1975–76	QUAA	20	8	11	1	–	–	17	3rd	25	10	15	1	.404	Won Semifinal series, 2–1 (Quebec–Trois-Rivières); Lost Championship series, 0–2 (Concordia)	Lost Eastern Semifinal, 1–4 (St. Francis Xavier)
1976–77	QUAA	20	6	10	4	–	–	16	3rd	20	6	10	4	.400	barred from postseason play for use of an ineligible player	
Program suspended
1978–79	QUAA	20	11	6	3	–	–	25	T–2nd	23	12	8	3	.587	Lost Semifinal series, 1–2 (Quebec–Chicoutimi)	
1979–80	QUAA	24	6	13	5	–	–	17	5th	24	6	13	5	.354		
1980–81	QUAA	24	15	9	0	–	–	30	3rd	27	16	11	0	.593	Lost Semifinal series, 1–2 (Ottawa)	
1981–82	QUAA	24	11	10	3	–	–	25	4th	26	11	12	3	.481	Lost Semifinal series, 0–2 (Concordia)	
1982–83	QUAA	28	16	12	0	–	–	32	2nd	30	16	14	0	.533	Lost Semifinal series, 0–2 (Quebec–Chicoutimi)	
Totals										GP	W	L	T/SOL	%	Championships	
Regular Season										390	195	167	28	.536	3 QOAA Championships, 1 East Division Title	
Conference Post-season										18	4	14	0	.222		
U Sports Postseason										1	0	1	0	.000	1 National tournament appearance	
Regular Season and Postseason Record										409	199	182	28	.521		

Note: Totals include results from 1954–55 onward.
