= QOAA men's ice hockey tournament =

Quebec–Ontario Athletic Association men's ice hockey tournament
- Conference hockey championship
- Sport: Ice hockey
- Conference: Quebec–Ontario Athletic Association
- Format: Single-elimination
- Played: 1903–1971
- Winner trophy: Queen's Cup

The Quebec–Ontario Athletic Association ice hockey tournament was an annual conference championship held between member teams.

== History ==
=== Early years ===
In 1902, three colleges reached an agreement and formed the first collegiate ice hockey conference in Canada. McGill, Queen's and Toronto arranged to play one another on a consistent annual basis to determine which among them was the best college team. At the time, all three continued to participate in other senior leagues but this was the first formal differentiation for college programs. At the start of the conference, a provision was made for a playoff to determine the conference champions but only if there was a tie at the top of the standings. The Canadian Intercollegiate Athletic Union (CIAU) continued as a three-team circuit for several years until Laval–Montreal joined in 1907. A year later, the league was one of the circuits that was allowed to participate for the inaugural Allan Cup, which was eventually won by Queen's.

The first time the playoffs were needed was in 1910 when three teams tied for the league title. Ottawa was selected to host the games as it was a neutral site, however, not every team was accepting of the situation. Because it was a three-way tie, two teams were required to play in a semifinal match. Despite having the greatest number of goals scored and the widest margin of victory during regular season play, Toronto was set to play McGill while Queen's, the defending champion, received a bye to the final. Toronto protested this decision and withdrew from competition. Queen's then defeated McGill to win the first conference tournament in league history. In 1911, after the addition of a 5th league member, the conference split itself into divisions. The English-speaking teams (group 1) continued to play their season schedule to determine the best of the three. The two French-speaking teams (group 2) played two games against one another to determine their champion. The winner of the two groups would then meet for the championship, establishing a planned postseason for the first time.

After two years, both French-speaking schools discontinued their programs and the league returned to its previous structure; a three-team league with a playoff used when needed. In 1915, due to the outbreak of World War I, the league suspended play until 1919. Once the war was over, all three teams returned to the league and it continued as it had immediately before the conflict. The league continued apace for most of the 1920s, however, 1928 saw the CIAU undergo a drastic change. Prior to the season, Queen's left the league due to financial constraints. Even with the reduced schedule and travel, Montreal experience problems during the season and saw only about 50 people attend its last home game. Montreal would leave after the year dropping league membership down to just 2 teams. The 2-team conference persisted for four years before Montreal rejoined the league in 1932 but they withdrew once more the following season. One year on, Queen's returned to the conference but that too lasted for just one season. In 1936 both Montreal and Queen's rejoined the league and, to help the financial situation, the four team entered into a partnership with the Quadrangular League where four Ivy League schools from America would play each Canadian school once per season. While the initial returns were good, attendance figured for the international games soon fell off and Montreal withdrew from the circuit in 1939. The International arrangement ended the next season when all of the Canadian programs suspended play due to World War II and was not continued after the war.

=== Collegiate only ===
Sometime between 1953 and 1955, the league changed its name from CIAU to QOAA (Quebec-Ontario Athletic Association). This was also the time when most Canadian colleges ended their senior-level play and focused solely on playing other colleges. The QOAA didn't seem to take much notice, as their membership and scheduling didn't change for the next several years. Queen's briefly returned in 1960 but the conference saw its biggest change yet two seasons later. 1962 brought four new colleges to the league, swelling its ranks to eight teams. The QOAA divided itself into east and west divisions but geography had little bearing on the allocation. The original 4 teams were all placed in the East division while the newer teams found themselves in the west. This situation lasted for two seasons before Ontario Agricultural ended its program as the college was being merged into the University of Guelph. The year off saw the QOAA abandon the division format and, since each team played the others twice during the season, no playoff was used for 1964. Curiously, Toronto, as conference champion, declined to participate in the national tournament, which was in its second year of existence that season, and the bid was instead given to Montreal. The following year, Guelph joined the conference along with Western Ontario. While the conference remained one division, a 4-team playoff was instituted. However, prior to the start of the postseason, all four school indicated that they did not want to participate in the national tournament and the conference did not send a representative in 1965. In 1966 the conference did not hold a postseason tournament but the member schools did drop their opposition to taking part in the University Cup. The next season, with enough lead time, the QOAA tournament returned.

In 1968, with the addition of three more schools, the conference was once more split into two divisions. The playoff was rearranged so that the winners of each division would play the second place team of the opposing division in the semifinals. The conference and format remained unchanged for the next 5 years. In 1971, a sizable shit occurred where the three conferences that spanned Ontario and Quebec were rearranged along provincial lines. The new conferences were the Ontario University Athletic Association and the Quebec University Athletic Association.

== Tournaments ==
=== 1903 ===
Seed	School	Standings
1	McGill	2–1–1
2	Queen's	2–2–0
3	Toronto	1–2–1

no playoff

=== 1904 ===
Seed	School	Standings
1	Queen's	3–1–0
2	Toronto	2–2–0
3	McGill	1–3–0

no playoff

=== 1905 ===
Seed	School	Standings
1	McGill	3–1–0
2	Queen's	2–2–0
3	Toronto	1–3–0

no playoff

=== 1906 ===
Seed	School	Standings
1	Queen's	3–1–0
2	McGill	2–2–0
3	Toronto	1–3–0

no playoff

=== 1907 ===
Seed	School	Standings
1	Toronto	3–1–0
2	McGill	2–2–0
3	Queen's	1–3–0

no playoff

=== 1908 ===
Seed	School	Standings
1	Toronto	6–0–0
2	Queen's	3–3–0
3	Laval–Montreal	2–4–0
4	McGill	1–5–0

no playoff

=== 1909 ===
Seed	School	Standings
1	Queen's	5–1–0
2	Toronto	3–2–1
3	McGill	2–4–0
4	Laval–Montreal	1–4–1

no playoff

=== 1910 ===
Seed	School	Standings
T–1	Queen's	4–2–0
T–1	Toronto	4–2–0
T–1	McGill	4–2–0
4	Laval–Montreal	0–6–0

Semifinal	Championship; March 7
	Queen's	8
~~Toronto~~	McGill	2
McGill

Note: Toronto withdrew when Queen's was given a bye to the final round.
Note: * denotes overtime period(s)

=== 1911 ===
Group 1			Group 2		
Seed	School	Standings	Seed	School	Standings
1	Toronto	3–1–0	1	Laval–Montreal	2–0–0
2	Queen's	2–2–0	2	Ottawa	0–2–0
3	McGill	1–3–0			

Championship; February 24, March 7
Toronto	7	14	21
Laval–Montreal	6	5	11

Note: * denotes overtime period(s)

=== 1912 ===
Group 1			Group 2		
Seed	School	Standings	Seed	School	Standings
1	McGill	4–0–0	T–1	Ottawa	1–1–0
2	Toronto	2–2–0	T–1	Laval–Montreal	1–1–0
3	Queen's	0–4–0			

Note: Ottawa was chosen as group winner based upon goal differential.

Championship; February 27, March 1
McGill	8	17	25
Ottawa	3	2	5

Note: * denotes overtime period(s)

=== 1913 ===
Seed	School	Standings
1	Toronto	3–1–0
2	McGill	2–2–0
3	Queen's	1–3–0

no playoff

=== 1914 ===
Seed	School	Standings
1	Queen's	3–1–0
2	Toronto	2–2–0
3	McGill	1–3–0

no playoff

=== 1915 ===
Seed	School	Standings
1	Toronto	4–0–0
2	Queen's	1–3–0
3	McGill	1–3–0

no playoff

=== 1916–1919 ===
League suspended due to World War I

=== 1920 ===
Seed	School	Standings
T–1	McGill	3–1–0
T–1	Toronto	3–1–0
3	Queen's	0–4–0

Championship; March 6
Toronto	5
McGill	4

Note: * denotes overtime period(s)

=== 1921 ===
Seed	School	Standings
1	Toronto	4–0–0
2	McGill	2–2–0
3	Queen's	0–4–0

no playoff

=== 1922 ===
Seed	School	Standings
1	Toronto	4–0–0
2	McGill	2–2–0
3	Queen's	0–4–0

no playoff

=== 1923 ===
Seed	School	Standings
1	Toronto	5–1–0
2	Queen's	3–3–0
3	McGill	2–4–0
4	Montreal	2–4–0

no playoff

=== 1924 ===
Seed	School	Standings
1	Toronto	5–1–0
2	Queen's	3–3–0
3	McGill	2–3–1
4	Montreal	1–4–1

no playoff

=== 1925 ===
Seed	School	Standings
1	Toronto	5–0–0
2	Queen's	3–3–0
3	Montreal	2–3–0
4	McGill	1–5–0

Note: A game between Toronto and Montreal was cancelled
no playoff

=== 1926 ===
Seed	School	Standings
1	Toronto	6–0–0
2	Montreal	3–3–0
3	Queen's	2–4–0
4	McGill	1–5–0

no playoff

=== 1927 ===
Seed	School	Standings
T–1	Toronto	5–1–0
T–1	McGill	5–1–0
3	Montreal	2–4–0
4	Queen's	0–6–0

Championship; March 4, 7
Toronto	5	4	9
McGill	2	0	2

Note: * denotes overtime period(s)

=== 1928 ===
Seed	School	Standings
1	Toronto	3–1–0
2	McGill	2–2–0
3	Montreal	1–3–0

no playoff

=== 1929 ===
Seed	School	Standings
	Toronto	–
	McGill	–

Note: no regular season play occurred.

Championship; February 2, 12
Toronto	6	3	9
McGill	1	2	3

Note: * denotes overtime period(s)

=== 1930 ===
Seed	School	Standings
	Toronto	–
	McGill	–

Note: no regular season play occurred.

Championship; January 18, February 20
Toronto	2	0	2
McGill	2	1	3

Note: * denotes overtime period(s)

=== 1931 ===
Seed	School	Standings
	Toronto	–
	McGill	–

Note: no regular season play occurred.

Championship; January 25, February 19
Toronto	2	2	4
McGill	2	4	6

Note: * denotes overtime period(s)

=== 1932 ===
Seed	School	Standings
	Toronto	–
	McGill	–

Note: no regular season play occurred.

Championship; January 19, 30
Toronto	2	2	4
McGill	2	1	3

Note: * denotes overtime period(s)

=== 1933 ===
Seed	School	Standings
1	McGill	3–0–1
2	Toronto	2–1–1
3	Montreal	0–4–0

no playoff

=== 1934 ===
Seed	School	Standings
	Toronto	–
	McGill	–

Note: no regular season play occurred.

Championship; February 2, 10
Toronto	0	4	4
McGill	5	4	9

Note: * denotes overtime period(s)

=== 1935 ===
Seed	School	Standings
1	McGill	4–0–0
2	Toronto	1–3–0
3	Queen's	1–3–0

no playoff

=== 1936 ===
Seed	School	Standings
	Toronto	–
	McGill	–

Note: no regular season play occurred.

Championship; February 7, 15
Toronto	0	3	3
McGill	5	10	15

Note: * denotes overtime period(s)

=== 1937 ===
Seed	School	Standings
1	McGill	6–0–0
2	Toronto	3–3–0
3	Montreal	2–4–0
4	Queen's	1–5–0

Note: Only games against Canadian colleges are included.
no playoff

=== 1938 ===
Seed	School	Standings
1	McGill	5–1–0
2	Queen's	4–2–0
3	Toronto	3–3–0
4	Montreal	0–6–0

Note: Only games against Canadian colleges are included.
no playoff

=== 1939 ===
Seed	School	Standings
1	McGill	5–1–0
2	Queen's	4–2–0
3	Toronto	3–3–0
4	Montreal	0–6–0

Note: Only games against Canadian colleges are included.
no playoff

=== 1940 ===
Seed	School	Standings
1	Toronto	4–0–0
2	McGill	2–2–0
3	Queen's	0–4–0

Note: Only games against Canadian colleges are included.
no playoff

=== 1941–1945 ===
League suspended due to World War II

=== 1946 ===
Seed	School	Standings
T–1	Toronto	5–1–0
T–1	McGill	5–1–0
3	Montreal	2–4–0
4	Queen's	0–6–0

Championship; March 15
Toronto	1
McGill	4

Note: * denotes overtime period(s)

=== 1947 ===
Seed	School	Standings
T–1	Toronto	6–2–1
T–1	McGill	6–2–1
3	Montreal	3–4–2
4	Queen's	1–8–0

Championship; March 8
Toronto	4
McGill	0

Note: * denotes overtime period(s)

=== 1948 ===
Seed	School	Standings
1	Toronto	10–2–0
2	McGill	9–3–0
3	Queen's	3–9–0
4	Montreal	2–10–0

no playoff

=== 1949 ===
Seed	School	Standings
1	Montreal	10–2–0
2	Toronto	8–4–0
3	McGill	6–6–0
4	Queen's	0–12–0

no playoff

=== 1950 ===
Seed	School	Standings
1	Montreal	11–1–0
2	Toronto	9–3–0
3	McGill	3–9–0
4	Queen's	1–11–0

no playoff

=== 1951 ===
Seed	School	Standings
1	Toronto	5–1–0
2	Montreal	3–2–1
3	McGill	2–3–1
4	Laval	0–4–2

no playoff

=== 1952 ===
Seed	School	Standings
1	Montreal	8–3–1
2	Toronto	6–4–2
3	Laval	7–5–0
4	McGill	1–10–1

no playoff

=== 1953 ===
Seed	School	Standings
1	Montreal	7–4–1
2	Laval	6–4–2
3	McGill	4–5–3
4	Toronto	3–7–2

no playoff

=== 1954 ===
Seed	School	Standings
1	Laval	8–3–1
2	Montreal	7–5–0
3	Toronto	5–6–1
4	McGill	3–9–0

no playoff

=== 1955 ===
Seed	School	Standings
1	Toronto	11–0–1
2	McGill	6–6–0
3	Montreal	4–7–1
4	Laval	2–10–0

no playoff

=== 1956 ===
Seed	School	Standings
1	Toronto	9–3–0
2	Laval	7–5–0
T–3	McGill	4–8–0
T–3	Montreal	4–8–0

no playoff

=== 1957 ===
Seed	School	Standings
1	Toronto	9–3–0
2	McGill	7–5–0
T–3	Montreal	4–8–0
T–3	Laval	4–8–0

no playoff

=== 1958 ===
Seed	School	Standings
1	Toronto	9–3–0
2	Montreal	6–6–0
3	Laval	5–7–0
4	McGill	4–8–0

no playoff

=== 1959 ===
Seed	School	Standings
1	Toronto	10–2–0
2	Laval	8–3–1
3	Montreal	4–6–2
4	McGill	0–11–1

no playoff

=== 1960 ===
Seed	School	Standings
1	Laval	13–1–0
2	Toronto	8–6–0
3	Queen's	4–4–0
4	McGill	3–9–2
5	Montreal	2–10–2

no playoff

=== 1961 ===
Seed	School	Standings
1	Laval	9–3–0
2	Toronto	8–4–0
3	Montreal	5–7–0
4	McGill	2–10–0

no playoff

=== 1962 ===
East			West		
Seed	School	Standings	Seed	School	Standings
1	Toronto	9–2–0	1	McMaster	11–1–0
2	McGill	6–5–0	2	Queen's	5–5–2
3	Laval	5–7–0	3	Ontario Agricultural	3–6–3
4	Montreal	3–9–0	4	Waterloo	2–9–1

Championship; February 28, March 2
E1	Toronto	3	10	13
W1	McMaster	5	5	10

Note: * denotes overtime period(s)

=== 1963 ===
East			West		
Seed	School	Standings	Seed	School	Standings
1	Laval	9–3–0	1	McMaster	12–0–0
2	Toronto	8–4–0	2	Ontario Agricultural	5–7–0
3	McGill	5–6–1	T–3	Waterloo	3–8–1
4	Montreal	1–10–1	T–3	Queen's	3–8–1

Championship
E1	Laval	3	4	7
W1	McMaster	5	7	12

Note: * denotes overtime period(s)

=== 1964 ===
Seed	School	Standings	Seed	School	Standings
1	Toronto	9–1–2	T–4	Laval	5–5–2
2	Montreal	7–2–3	6	Queen's	3–7–2
3	McMaster	6–5–1	7	Waterloo	1–11–0
T–4	McGill	4–4–4			

no playoff

=== 1965 ===
Seed	School	Standings	Seed	School	Standings
1	Toronto	15–1–0	6	McMaster	5–8–3
2	Montreal	13–3–0	T–7	McGill	3–12–1
3	Western Ontario	11–4–1	T–7	Waterloo	2–11–3
4	Queen's	8–6–2	9	Guelph	1–13–2
5	Laval	7–7–2			

Semifinals; March 5
1	Toronto	4
4	Queen's	6
2	Montreal	5
3	Western Ontario	4

Championship; March 6
4	Queen's	3
2	Montreal	4

Note: * denotes overtime period(s)

=== 1966 ===
Seed	School	Standings	Seed	School	Standings
1	Toronto	13–2–1	T–5	Queen's	6–10–0
2	Western Ontario	12–2–2	7	Montreal	5–11–0
3	Waterloo	11–3–2	8	McGill	4–11–1
4	Laval	9–6–1	9	Guelph	2–13–1
T–5	McMaster	6–10–0			

no playoff

=== 1967 ===
Seed	School	Standings	Seed	School	Standings
1	Toronto	14–1–1	T–6	Montreal	5–9–2
2	Waterloo	11–3–2	T–6	Laval	5–9–2
3	Western Ontario	10–6–0	8	McGill	4–11–1
4	Queen's	8–5–3	9	Guelph	2–13–1
5	McMaster	7–9–0			

Semifinals; March 3
1	Toronto	10
4	Queen's	1
2	Waterloo	6
3	Western Ontario	2

Championship; March 4
1	Toronto	9
2	Waterloo	4

Note: * denotes overtime period(s)

=== 1968 ===
Seed	School	Standings	Seed	School	Standings
1	Toronto	14–1–1	6	Laval	7–8–1
2	Waterloo	14–2–0	7	Guelph	3–12–1
3	McMaster	9–5–2	8	Queen's	3–13–0
4	Montreal	9–6–1	9	McGill	2–14–0
5	Western Ontario	7–9–0			

Semifinals; March 1
1	Toronto	4
4	Montreal	3
2	Waterloo	6
3	McMaster	5

Championship; March 2
1	Toronto	8
2	Waterloo	1

Note: * denotes overtime period(s)

=== 1969 ===
East			West		
Seed	School	Standings	Seed	School	Standings
T–1	Laval	12–3–0	1	Toronto	13–1–1
T–1	Carleton	12–3–0	2	Waterloo	11–3–1
3	Montreal	9–5–1	3	Western Ontario	7–7–1
4	McGill	5–9–1	4	Windsor	5–8–2
5	Queen's	5–10–0	5	McMaster	5–10–0
6	Ottawa	1–14–0	6	Guelph	1–13–1

Semifinals; February 28
E1	Laval	2
W2	Waterloo	4
W1	Toronto	10
E2	Carleton	6

Championship; March 1
W2	Waterloo	0
W1	Toronto	4

Note: * denotes overtime period(s)

=== 1970 ===
East			West		
Seed	School	Standings	Seed	School	Standings
1	Ottawa	10–4–1	1	Toronto	12–1–2
2	Montreal	9–5–1	2	Waterloo	10–3–2
3	Laval	8–6–0 ^{†}	3	Western Ontario	5–6–4
4	Carleton	7–6–2	4	Guelph	5–7–3
5	McGill	5–7–3	5	Windsor	4–9–2
6	Queen's	1–12–1 ^{†}	6	McMaster	1–11–3

† Laval and Queen's played one game that was worth 4 points in the standings.

Semifinals; February 27
E1	Ottawa	3
W2	Waterloo	7
W1	Toronto	11
E2	Montreal	0

Championship; February 28
W2	Waterloo	4
W1	Toronto	7

Note: * denotes overtime period(s)

=== 1971 ===
East			West		
Seed	School	Standings	Seed	School	Standings
1	Carleton	10–3–2	1	Waterloo	12–2–1
2	Queen's	7–4–4	2	Toronto	12–3–0
T–3	Montreal	7–5–3	3	Guelph	5–8–2
T–3	Laval	7–5–3	4	Western Ontario	4–8–3
5	McGill	5–8–2	T–5	McMaster	3–9–3
6	Ottawa	2–13–0	T–5	Windsor	3–9–3

Semifinals; February 27
E1	Carleton	5
W2	Toronto	6
W1	Waterloo	3
E2	Queen's	8

Championship; February 28
W2	Toronto	5
E2	Queen's	4

Note: * denotes overtime period(s)

== Championships ==
School	Championships
Toronto	36
McGill	11
Queen's	5
Montreal	4
Laval	3
McMaster	1

== See also ==
- OUAA men's ice hockey tournament
- QUAA men's ice hockey tournament
- OUA men's ice hockey tournament
