= 1976 CIAU University Cup =

Canadian hockey tournament

Tournament details
- Venue(s): Varsity Arena, Toronto, Ontario
- Dates: March 5–14
- Teams: 10

Final positions
- Champions: Toronto Varsity Blues (8th title)
- Runners-up: Guelph Gryphons

Tournament statistics
- Games played: 11

Awards
- MVP: Kent Ruhnke (Toronto)

The 1976 CIAU Men's University Cup Hockey Tournament (14th annual) was held at the Varsity Arena in Toronto, Ontario. The Toronto Varsity Blues served as tournament host.

== Road to the Cup ==
=== AUAA playoffs ===
Semifinals
1	Saint Mary’s	5
4	Moncton	9
2	St. Francis Xavier	9
3	Mount Allison	4

Championship
4	Moncton	5
2	St. Francis Xavier	7

Note: * denotes overtime period(s)

=== Canada West playoffs ===
Championship; February 27-28
1	Calgary	6	3	—
2	Alberta	2	0	—

Note: * denotes overtime period(s)

=== GPAC season ===
Seed	School	Standings
1	Manitoba	11–7–0
2	Brandon	10–8–0
3	Lakehead	8–10–0
4	Winnipeg	7–11–0

No playoff

=== OUAA playoffs ===
Quarterfinals; February 20–21
C2	Ryerson	0
E2	York	14
E1	Toronto	2
E3	Queen's	1
C1	McMaster	5
W2	Guelph	6

Semifinals; February 27
W1	Western Ontario	2
E2	York	5
E1	Toronto	5
W2	Guelph	6

Championship; February 28
E2	York	4
W2	Guelph	5

Note: * denotes overtime period(s)

=== QUAA playoffs ===
Semifinals; February 20-23
1	Concordia	10	13	—
4	Bishop's	2	0	—
2	Quebec–Trois-Rivières	6	5	3
3	Laval	3	6	5

Championship; February 25-27
1	Concordia	12	7	—
3	Laval	2	2	—

Note: * denotes overtime period(s)

== University Cup ==
The tournament was expanded and heavily reconfigured. The field was divided into three groups: East, West and byes. The OUAA champion, Guelph, and the tournament host, Toronto, received byes into championship round. The Eastern bracket contained the teams that reached the championship games of the AUAA and QUAA while the Western bracket contained the teams that reached the championship game of Canada West and the top two teams in the GPAC standings. The regional brackets were organized so that the conference champion would play the runner up of the opposite conference in the semifinal and the winners would play to determine which teams would advance to the championship round.

In the championship round, the teams played one first round game to determine seeding. The winners of the first round game would then play a different losing team in the semifinals. The winner of the semifinal games would then play for the championship.

All rounds, with the exception of the first round in the championship series, were single elimination.

West regional games were played at the Father David Bauer Olympic Arena in Calgary, Alberta. East regional games were played at the Loyola Arena in Montreal, Quebec.

=== East teams ===
Team	Qualification	Record	Appearance	Last
Concordia Stingers	Quebec: QUAA Champion	23–0–1	1st	Never *
Laval Rouge et Or	Quebec: QUAA Runner-Up	10–14–1	1st	Never
Moncton Aigles Bleus	Atlantic: AUAA Runner-Up	12–5–1	1st	Never
St. Francis Xavier X-Men	Atlantic: AUAA Champion	14–4–0	5th	1968

* Concordia was formed out of a merger between Loyola and Sir George Williams, who had made the University Cup five and seven times respectively.

=== Ontario teams ===
Team	Qualification	Record	Appearance	Last
Guelph Gryphons	Ontario: OUAA Champion	17–6–0	1st	Never
Toronto Varsity Blues	Host	14–4–0	10th	1975

=== West teams ===
Team	Qualification	Record	Appearance	Last
Alberta Golden Bears	West: Canada West Runner-Up	16–10–0	9th	1975
Brandon Bobcats	Plains: GPAC Runner-Up	10–8–0	3rd	1975
Calgary Dinos	West: Canada West Champion	19–7–0	2nd	1974
Manitoba Bisons	Plains: GPAC Champion	11–7–0	2nd	1965

=== Bracket ===
Regional Semifinals; March 5
Q1	Concordia	5
A2	Moncton	0
East
A1	St. Francis Xavier	4
Q2	Laval	1
GP1	Manitoba	5
CW2	Alberta	6
West
CW1	Calgary	6
GP2	Brandon	4

Regional Finals; March 6
Q1	Concordia	5
A1	St. Francis Xavier	3
CW2	Alberta	1
CW1	Calgary	3

First Round; March 11
O1	Guelph	2
Q1	Concordia	5
O2	Toronto	4
CW1	Calgary	5

Semifinals; March 13
Q1	Concordia	2
O2	Toronto	3
CW1	Calgary	1
O1	Guelph	4

Championship; March 14
O2	Toronto	7
O1	Guelph	2

Note: * denotes overtime period(s)

== Championship final ==
March 14, 1976	O1 Guelph Gryphons	2–7	O2 Toronto Varsity Blues	Varsity Arena, Toronto, Ontario
