= UQTR Patriotes men's ice hockey =

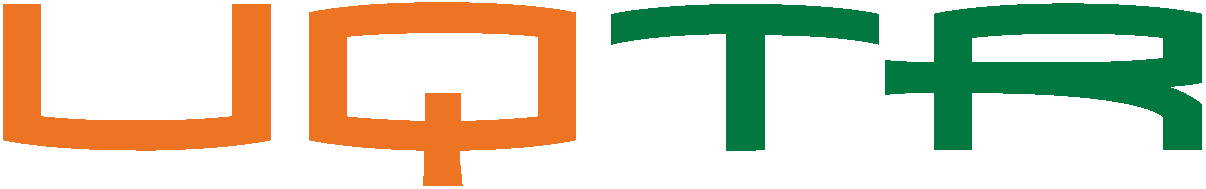
- University: Université du Québec à Trois-Rivières
- Conference: OUA; OUA East Division
- First season: 1969–70
- Head coach: Marc-Étienne Hubert; 2013–14; 13 years ago season
- Assistant coaches: Marc-André Ronda; Alexandre Mélançon; Luc Bélanger
- Arena: Colisée Jean-Guy Talbot; Trois-Rivières, Quebec
- Colors: Green, Orange, and White

U Sports tournament champions
- 1987, 1991, 2001, 2003, 2022

U Sports tournament appearances
- 1984, 1986, 1987, 1990, 1991, 1992, 1996, 1998, 1999, 2000, 2001, 2002, 2003, 2005, 2007, 2010, 2012, 2013, 2015, 2016, 2022, 2023, 2024

Conference tournament champions
- 1986, 1987, 1991, 1992, 1999, 2000, 2001, 2002, 2003, 2007, 2013, 2016, 2022, 2023, 2024

Conference regular season champions
- 1974, 1980, 1986, 1987, 1989, 1992, 1995, 1996, 1997, 1999, 2000, 2001, 2009, 2010, 2016

The UQTR Patriotes men's ice hockey team is an active ice hockey team representing the UQTR Patriotes athletics program of Université du Québec à Trois-Rivières. The team is a member of the Ontario University Athletics conference and competes in U Sports. The Patriotes play their home games at the Colisée Jean-Guy Talbot in Trois-Rivières, Quebec.

== History ==
From the very foundation of the university in 1969, UQTR has sponsored ice hockey as a varsity sport. Initially a member of the Ottawa–St. Lawrence Conference (OSLC), the Patriotes were placed in the Quebec Universities Athletic Association (QUAA) in 1971 when four separate conferences were realigned into two provincial leagues for teams in Quebec and Ontario. UQTR won its first (tied) league title in 1974, however, because the Patriotes had a difficult time finding success in the postseason, the team wasn't able to win its way to a berth in the University Cup until 1986.

Once the team finally reached the national stage, they proved to be one of the top teams in the nation. Their first trip resulted in a runner-up finish but they followed that up with a national championship the following year. Unfortunately for the program, their success did little to help out the conference. The QUAA decided to stop sponsoring ice hockey in 1987, due to a lack of interest from member teams, and the four remaining programs were all absorbed into the Ontario University Athletic Association (OUAA) that summer. The Patriotes' new and far larger conference didn't seem to bother the team at all as they won their division in each of the first five seasons. The much tougher playoff system, however, saw UQTR bow out in the semifinals in consecutive years and prevent the team from defending its first championship.

In 1987, UQTR, McGill, and Concordia joined the OUAA due to the lack of teams in Quebec that were competing in the QUAA. The Patriotes continued their success in the OUAA, winning the East Division regular season title in each of their first five seasons there before winning back-to-back Queen's Cup conference championships in 1991 and 1992. The Patriotes also won their second national championship in 1991 after defeating the Alberta Golden Bears.

UQTR returned to the national tournament in 1990 but that was just a prelude for their second championship in 1991, which also included their first OUAA tournament title as well. The Patriotes proved to be one of the best teams in not only the OUAA but all of Canada throughout the 1990s. The program won five regular season titles to go along with two tournament championships. UQTR made six trips to the national tournament in the decade but they weren't able to finish on top again until 2001.

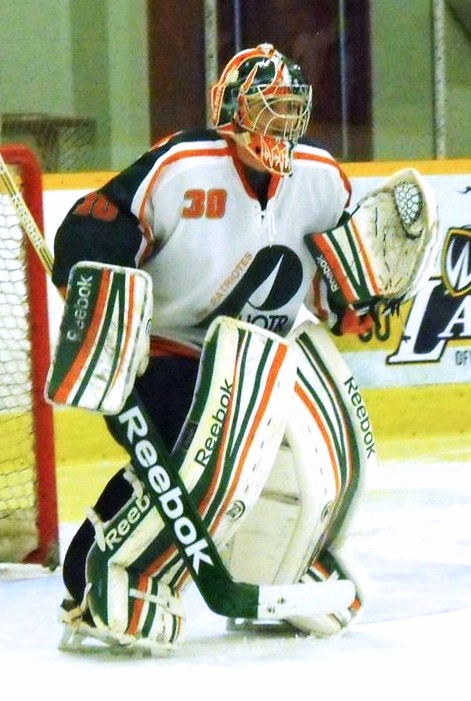
UQTR men's goalie during 2013-14 season

The Patriotes also played in the University Cup final three years in a row from 2001 to 2003, winning in 2001 and 2003, both times over the St. Francis Xavier X-Men. The Patriotes won the Queen's Cup three more times in 2007, 2013, and 2016, but did not replicate their national success and could not make it past the second round in each U-Cup tournament. The program's four University Cup national titles are tied for the fourth-most in U Sports men's ice hockey.

After the program's fourth championship in 2003, the Patriotes declined slightly. Though still a formidable force, UQTR was not as dominant a squad in the 21st century. Even with a good deal of success in the regular season, the Patriotes were upset in the conference tournament several times and won one championship over a nine-year period.

After the COVID-19 pandemic forced the cancellation of the entire 2020–21 season, UQTR shot back to the top of the conference, winning the truncated championship in '22 as well as going undefeated in postseason play to win their fifth national title. Dual championships followed in each of the next two seasons with UQTR ending up with both a bronze and silver in University Cup play.

== Season-by-season results ==
Note: GP = Games played, W = Wins, L = Losses, T = Ties, OTL = Overtime Losses, SOL = Shootout Losses, Pts = Points

U Sports Champion	U Sports Semifinalist	Conference regular season champions	Conference Division Champions	Conference Playoff Champions

Season	Conference	Regular Season													Conference Tournament Results	National Tournament Results
Season	Conference	Conference								Overall					Conference Tournament Results	National Tournament Results
Season	Conference	GP	W	L	T	OTL	SOL	Pts*	Finish	GP	W	L	T	%	Conference Tournament Results	National Tournament Results
1969–70	OSLC	14	4	8	2	–	–	10	6th	14	4	8	2	.357		
1970–71	OSLC	18	12	5	1	–	–	25	2nd	18	5	13	0	.278	Won Semifinal, 5–4 (Bishop's); Lost Championship, 1–3 (Loyola)	
1971–72	QUAA	21	7	10	4	–	–	18	6th	21	7	10	4	.429		
1972–73	QUAA	24	2	19	3	–	–	7	7th	24	2	19	3	.146		
1973–74	QUAA	18	14	2	2	–	–	30	T–1st	19	14	3	2	.789	Lost Semifinal, 5–8 (Sherbrooke)	
1974–75	QUAA	20	13	3	4	–	–	30	2nd	21	13	4	4	.714	Lost Semifinal, 4–6 (Sir George Williams)	
1975–76	QUAA	20	10	9	1	–	–	21	2nd	23	11	11	1	.500	Lost Semifinal series, 1–2 (Laval)	
1976–77	QUAA	20	16	2	2	–	–	34	2nd	24	18	4	2	.792	Won Semifinal series, 2–0 (Bishop's); Lost Championship series, 0–2 (Concordia)	
1977–78	QUAA	16	11	4	1	–	–	23	2nd	23	15	7	1	.674	Won Semifinal series, 2–0 (McGill); Lost Championship series, 2–3 (Concordia)	
1978–79	QUAA	20	4	15	1	–	–	9	5th	20	4	15	1	.225		
1979–80	QUAA	24	15	4	5	–	–	35	1st	28	17	6	5	.696	Won Semifinal series, 2–0 (Bishop's); Lost Championship series, 0–2 (Concordia)	
1980–81	QUAA	24	13	10	1	–	–	27	4th	26	13	12	1	.519	Lost Semifinal series, 0–2 (Concordia)	
1981–82	QUAA	24	16	8	0	–	–	32	2nd	28	18	10	0	.643	Won Semifinal series, 2–0 (Ottawa); Lost Championship series, 0–2 (Concordia)	
1982–83	QUAA	30	11	18	1	–	–	23	4th	32	11	20	1	.359	Lost Semifinal series, 0–2 (Concordia)	
1983–84	QUAA	24	8	15	1	–	–	17	5th	24	8	15	1	.354		Lost Semifinal series, 4–14 (Toronto)
1984–85	QUAA	20	8	10	2	–	–	18	3rd	23	9	12	2	.435	Lost Semifinal series, 1–2 (Ottawa)	
1985–86	QUAA	20	15	5	0	–	–	30	1st	31	23	8	0	.742	Won Semifinal series, 2–1 (Concordia); Won Championship series, 3–1 (Ottawa)	Won Eastern Quarterfinal series, 2–0 (Calgary); Won Semifinal, 5–2 (York); Lost Championship, 2–5 (Alberta)
1986–87	QUAA	18	14	2	2	–	–	.833	1st	25	21	2	2	.880	Won Championship series, 4–0 (McGill)	Won Pool 2 Round-Robin, 5–4 (Alberta), 4–2 (York); Won Championship, 6–3 (Saskatchewan)
1987–88	OUAA	25	19	4	2	–	–	40	2nd	31	23	6	2	.774	Won Division Semifinal series, 2–0 (Ottawa); Won Division Final series, 2–1 (McGill); Lost Semifinal, 2–3 (Western Ontario)	
1988–89	OUAA	26	20	3	3	–	–	43	1st	32	24	5	3	.797	Won Division Semifinal series, 2–1 (Queen's); Won Division Final series, 2–0 (McGill); Lost Semifinal, 4–5 (York)	
1989–90	OUAA	22	15	5	2	–	–	32	3rd	22	9	13	0	.409	Won Quarterfinal series, 2–0 (McGill); Won Semifinal series, 2–1 (York); Lost Championship series, 0–2 (Wilfrid Laurier)	Lost Semifinal, 1–2 (Wilfrid Laurier)
1990–91	OUAA	22	17	4	1	–	–	35	2nd	30	25	4	1	.850	Won Quarterfinal series, 2–0 (McGill); Won Semifinal series, 2–0 (Toronto); Won Championship series, 2–0 (Waterloo)	Won Semifinal, 5–4 (Waterloo); Won Championship, 7–2 (Alberta)
1991–92	OUAA	22	17	4	1	–	–	35	1st	22	8	12	2	.409	Won Quarterfinal series, 2–0 (York); Won Semifinal series, 2–1 (Toronto); Won Championship, 8–1 (Wilfrid Laurier)	Lost Semifinal, 1–9 (Alberta)
1992–93	OUAA	22	11	7	4	–	–	26	T–6th	23	11	8	4	.565	Lost First Round, 3–4 (Queen's)	
1993–94	OUAA	24	16	6	2	–	–	34	4th	25	15	9	1	.620	Won Division Semifinal, 6–1 (Concordia); Won Division Final series, 2–0 (Ottawa); Lost Semifinal, 2–3 (Guelph)	
1994–95	OUAA	24	20	1	3	–	–	43	1st	28	22	3	3	.839	Won Division Final series, 2–1 (McGill); Lost Semifinal, 1–3 (Guelph)	
1995–96	OUAA	26	21	5	0	–	–	42	T–1st	32	24	8	0	.750	Won Division Final series, 2–1 (Ottawa); Won Semifinal, 4–3 (Guelph); Lost Championship, 1–5 (Waterloo)	Lost Semifinal, 3–4 (Acadia)
1996–97	OUAA	26	21	3	2	–	–	44	1st	30	23	5	2	.800	Won Division Final series, 2–1 (McGill); Lost Semifinal, 1–3 (Guelph)	
1997–98	OUA	26	20	4	2	–	–	28	2nd	33	25	6	2	.788	Won Division Final series, 3–0 (Concordia); Won Semifinal, ? (Guelph); Lost Championship, 1–2 (Windsor)	Lost Pool B Round-Robin, 4–7 (Acadia), 5–3 (Saskatchewan)
1998–99	OUA	26	20	5	1	–	–	41	1st	32	24	7	1	.766	Won Division Final series, 2–0 (Concordia); Won Semifinal, 3–1 (Guelph); Won Championship, 7–0 (York)	Lost Pool A Round-Robin, 2–5 (York), 2–5 (Alberta)
1999–00	OUA	26	20	2	4	–	–	44	1st	33	25	4	4	.818	Won Division Final series, 2–1 (McGill); Won Semifinal, 3–1 (Queen's); Won Championship, 3–2 (Western Ontario)	Lost Pool A Round-Robin, 3–2 (Calgary), 1–3 (Alberta)
2000–01	OUA	24	21	1	2	–	–	44	1st	31	28	1	2	.935	Won Division Final series, 2–0 (Concordia); Won Semifinal, 4–1 (Toronto); Won Championship, 4–3 (Western Ontario)	Won Pool 2 Round-Robin, 6–2 (St. Thomas), 10–4 (Wilfrid Laurier); Won Championship, 5–4 (St. Francis Xavier)
2001–02	OUA	24	15	8	1	–	–	31	T–3rd	33	23	9	1	.712	Won Division Semifinal series, 2–0 (McGill); Won Division Final series, 2–0 (Ottawa); Won Semifinal, 4–3 (OT) (Toronto); Won Championship, 5–4 (Western Ontario)	Won Pool B Round-Robin, 4–2 (Saskatchewan), 5–3 (Saint Mary's); Lost Championship, 3–4 (3OT) (Western Ontario)
2002–03	OUA	24	20	2	2	–	–	42	2nd	31	27	2	2	.903	Won Division Final series, 2–0 (Ottawa); Won Semifinal, 6–3 (Toronto); Won Championship, 7–4 (York)	Won Pool 2 Round-Robin, 2–1 (Lakehead), 4–3 (New Brunswick); Won Championship, 3–0 (St. Francis Xavier)
2003–04	OUA	24	14	5	4	1	–	33	5th	29	17	8	4	.655	Won Division Quarterfinal series, 2–0 (Concordia); Lost Division Semifinal series, 1–2 (Ottawa)	
2004–05	OUA	24	15	5	3	1	–	34	3rd	32	20	9	3	.672	Won Division Quarterfinal series, 2–0 (Royal Military College); Won Division Semifinal series, 2–0 (Toronto); Won Division Final series, 2–1 (McGill); Lost Championship, 0–4 (Western Ontario)	Lost Pool A Round-Robin, 1–4 (Manitoba), 0–11 (Alberta)
2005–06	OUA	24	16	6	2	0	–	34	3rd	30	20	8	2	.700	Won Division Quarterfinal series, 2–0 (Royal Military College); Won Division Semifinal series, 2–0 (Toronto); Lost Division Final series, 0–2 (McGill)	
2006–07	OUA	28	17	5	3	3	–	40	4th	36	23	10	3	.681	Won Division Semifinal series, 2–1 (Ottawa); Won Division Final series, 2–0 (Toronto); Won Championship, 5–3 (Wilfrid Laurier)	Lost Pool B Round-Robin, 3–2 (Saskatchewan), 0–6 (New Brunswick)
2007–08	OUA	28	22	5	–	0	1	45	2nd	32	24	7	1	.766	Won Division Semifinal series, 2–0 (Ottawa); Lost Division Final series, 0–2 (McGill)	
2008–09	OUA	28	21	4	–	3	0	45	T–1st	33	23	10	0	.697	Won Division Semifinal series, 2–1 (Carleton); Lost Division Final series, 0–2 (McGill)	
2009–10	OUA	28	23	3	–	1	1	48	1st	36	27	8	1	.764	Won Division Quarterfinal series, 2–0 (Concordia); Won Division Semifinal series, 2–0 (Ryerson); Lost Division Final series, 0–2 (McGill)	Lost Pool B Round-Robin, 2–4 (Alberta), 2–7 (Lakehead)
2010–11	OUA	28	19	8	–	1	0	39	3rd	37	24	13	0	.649	Won Division Quarterfinal series, 2–1 (Concordia); Won Division Semifinal series, 2–1 (Carleton); Lost Division Final series, 1–2 (McGill)	
2011–12	OUA	28	19	7	–	1	1	40	3rd	39	24	14	1	.628	Won Division Quarterfinal series, 2–1 (Ryerson); Won Division Semifinal series, 2–1 (Carleton); Lost Division Final series, 0–2 (McGill); Won Bronze Medal Game, 5–3 (Windsor)	Lost Pool B Round-Robin, 1–6 (New Brunswick), 2–3 (OT) (Western Ontario)
2012–13	OUA	28	21	6	–	0	1	43	2nd	38	29	8	1	.776	Won Division Quarterfinal series, 2–0 (Ryerson); Won Division Semifinal series, 2–0 (Nipissing); Won Division Final series, 2–1 (Carleton); Won Championship, 4–1 (Waterloo)	Lost Pool B Round-Robin, 3–1 (Saskatchewan), 3–8 (New Brunswick)
2013–14	OUA	28	22	6	–	0	0	44	T–2nd	32	24	8	0	.750	Won Division Quarterfinal series, 2–0 (Ontario Tech); Lost Division Semifinal series, 0–2 (McGill)	
2014–15	OUA	26	19	4	–	1	2	41	T–3rd	36	26	8	2	.750	Won Division Quarterfinal series, 2–0 (Nipissing); Won Division Semifinal series, 2–0 (Carleton); Won Division Final series, 2–0 (McGill); Lost Championship, 0–4 (Guelph)	Won Quarterfinal, 6–5 (OT) (Acadia); Lost Semifinal, 1–5 (Alberta); Lost Bronze Medal Game, 2–3 (OT) (Guelph)
2015–16	OUA	28	24	3	–	1	0	49	1st	36	31	5	0	.861	Won Division Quarterfinal series, 2–0 (Laurentian); Won Division Semifinal series, 2–0 (Ontario Tech); Won Division Final series, 2–0 (Carleton); Won Championship, 4–3 (OT) (Western Ontario)	Lost Quarterfinal, 2–3 (Saint Mary's)
2016–17	OUA	28	16	9	–	1	2	35	T–6th	33	18	13	2	.576	Won Division Quarterfinal series, 2–1 (Carleton); Lost Division Semifinal series, 0–2 (McGill)	
2017–18	OUA	28	9	18	–	1	0	19	T–19th	28	9	19	0	.321		
2018–19	OUA	28	14	11	–	2	1	31	11th	30	14	15	1	.483	Lost Division Quarterfinal series, 0–2 (Carleton)	
2019–20	OUA	28	19	6	–	1	2	41	4th	33	22	9	2	.697	Won Division Quarterfinal series, 2–0 (Queen's); Lost Division Semifinal series, 1–2 (Ottawa)	
2020–21	Season cancelled due to COVID-19 pandemic															
2021–22	OUA	15	10	3	–	1	1	.733	T–3rd	22	17	4	1	.795	Won Division Quarterfinal, 6–1 (Carleton); Won Division Semifinal, 6–3 (Ontario Tech); Won Division Final, 1–0 (McGill); Won Championship, 3–1 (Brock)	Won Quarterfinal, 2–1 (2OT) (British Columbia); Won Semifinal, 7–2 (Ryerson); Won Championship, 5–4 (2OT) (Alberta)
2022–23	OUA	26	19	7	–	0	0	38	4th	32	23	9	0	.719	Won Division Semifinal series, 2–0 (Carleton); Won Division Final series, 2–1 (Concordia); Won Championship, 3–2 (3OT) (Windsor)	Won Quarterfinal, 4–1 (Saint Mary's); Lost Semifinal, 3–6 (New Brunswick); Won Bronze Medal Game, 3–2 (Prince Edward Island)
2023–24	OUA	28	21	6	–	0	1	43	2nd	38	28	9	1	.750	Won Division Semifinal series, 2–1 (Ottawa); Won Division Final series, 2–1 (McGill); Won Championship, 3–2 (2OT) (Toronto Metropolitan)	Won Quarterfinal, 5–1 (Moncton); Won Semifinal, 5–4 (McGill); Lost Championship, 0–4 (New Brunswick)
Totals										GP	W	L	T/SOL	%	Championships	
Regular Season										1267	802	378	87	.667	4 QUAA Championships, 5 OUAA Championships, 6 OUA Championships, 18 Far-East Titles, 3 East Titles	
Conference Post-season										237	162	75	0	.684	2 QUAA Championships, 2 OUAA Championships, 11 OUA Championships	
U Sports Postseason										52	28	24	0	.538	23 National tournament appearances	
Regular Season and Postseason Record										1556	992	477	87	.665	5 National Championships	
