= International Intercollegiate League =

Collegiate ice hockey league (1936–1940)

- Founded: 1936
- Ceased: 1940
- Sports fielded: Ice hockey
- No. of teams: 7 to 8
- Region: Northeastern United States and Eastern Canada

The International Intercollegiate League is a defunct NCAA Division I and U Sports ice hockey conference. The league was a joint venture between the Quadrangular League and the Canadian Intercollegiate Athletic Union to determine the International Intercollegiate Champion.

== History ==
In 1936, eight college teams evenly split between Canada and the United States agreed to a partnership. The programs partially merged their respective conferences into one conglomerate and arranged to play their international rivals once per season. The team with the best record at the end of the year would receive the Thompson Trophy as international champions. Though the Quadrangular League was widely regarded as the best conference in US at the time, it was not singular in its claim to possessing the national champion. Similarly, the CIAU did possess two of the strongest Canadian programs but the lack of competition with teams outside of the region left the claim as international champions ring hollow.

From the start of play, the league revealed a disparity in capability. In the first season, Harvard was the only US school able to defeat any of the four Canadian colleges but even that achievement was short-lived. In the second and third seasons, only Montreal, the worst of the Canadian teams, lost to its American counterparts on a consistent basis and once Montreal withdrew in 1939, the existence of the league was in jeopardy. To make matters worse, despite winning most of their games, the Canadian schools were losing money on the international games. While both sides were able to get decent crowds for the games held south of the border, few Canadians were willing to pay to watch one of their home teams beat up on an inferior American squad. While the financial situation was looming, it ultimately proved to be a moot point as the league was shuttered in 1940 when the three remaining Canadian schools suspended play due to World War II.

After the war, the league remained dormant, however, both sides agreed to continue awarding the Thompson Trophy. Instead of interleague play, the two separate conferences would have their respective champions play a single game for the international title. While Canada still did not have a national tournament to decide its champion, the NCAA held its inaugural championship in 1948. With the US colleges turning their attention towards a national tournament, the annual international competition ceased after 1949.

== Members ==
Location of Colleges

Institution	Nickname	Location	Founded	Tenure	Current conference	Colors
Dartmouth College	Indians †	Hanover, New Hampshire	1769	1936–1940	ECAC Hockey	
Harvard University	Crimson	Boston, Massachusetts	1636	1936–1940	ECAC Hockey	
McGill University	Redmen †	Montreal, Quebec	1821	1936–1940	OUA	
Université de Montréal	Carabins	Montreal, Quebec	1878	1936–1939	Defunct	
Princeton University	Tigers	Princeton, New Jersey	1746	1936–1940	ECAC Hockey	
Queen's University at Kingston	Golden Gaels	Kingston, Ontario	1841	1936–1940	OUA	
University of Toronto	Varsity Blues	Toronto, Ontario	1827	1936–1940	OUA	
Yale University	Bulldogs	New Haven, Connecticut	1701	1936–1940	ECAC Hockey	

† schools have since changed their monikers.

== Results ==
=== Pre-playoff ===
==== 1936–37 ====
Rank	School	Standings
1	McGill	10–0–0
2	Harvard	9–1–0
3	Toronto	6–4–0
4	Montreal	5–5–0
5	Queen's	4–6–0
6	Dartmouth	3–7–0
7	Yale	2–8–0
8	Princeton	1–9–0

==== 1937–38 ====
Rank	School	Standings
1	McGill	9–1–0
2	Queen's	8–2–0
3	Dartmouth	7–3–0
4	Toronto	6–3–1
5	Harvard	3–6–1
6	Yale	2–7–1
7	Princeton	2–7–1
8	Montreal	1–9–0

==== 1938–39 ====
Rank	School	Standings
1	McGill	9–1–0
2	Toronto	7–3–0
3	Queen's	7–3–0
4	Dartmouth	7–3–0
5	Harvard	5–4–1
6	Princeton	3–7–0
7	Yale	1–8–1
8	Montreal	0–10–0

==== 1939–40 ====
Rank	School	Standings
1	Toronto	8–0–0
2	McGill	6–2–0
3	Yale	5–3–1
4	Princeton	4–4–1
5	Queen's	4–4–0
6	Dartmouth	2–7–0
7	Harvard	0–9–0

=== Playoff ===
1947: March 14 at Providence; Toronto ties Dartmouth 2–2 (no overtime due to poor ice conditions).
1948: March 15 at Boston; Toronto defeats Dartmouth 5–0.
1949: March 15 at Montreal; Montreal defeats Dartmouth 4–3.

== See also ==
- Ontario University Athletics
- ECAC Hockey
