= QUAA men's ice hockey tournament =

Quebec Universities Athletic Association men's ice hockey tournament
- Conference hockey championship
- Sport: Ice hockey
- Conference: Quebec Universities Athletic Association
- Format: Single-elimination
- Played: 1972–1987

The Quebec Universities Athletic Association ice hockey tournament was an annual conference championship held between member teams.

== History ==
After the realignment of the Quebec–Ontario Athletic Association, Ontario Intercollegiate Athletic Association and Ottawa-St. Lawrence Conference in 1971, the Quebec Universities Athletic Association was born. The league began with 8 teams and, despite the name, one was located in Ontario (Royal Military College). The inaugural postseason tournament included four teams with all games being single-elimination. The league began to contract almost immediately when Montreal suspended play after just one season. RMC left after the second year and, although they were replace by Macdonald, that reprieve lasted for just one year. The conference briefly included a quarterfinal round but, with both Macdonald and Sherbrooke leaving after 1974, the conference abandoned that format. One year later, Loyola and Sir George Williams merged, leaving the QUAA with four members schools.

Before the start of the 1975–76 season, Laval restarted its program, bringing the league back up to five teams. At this point, the league shifted their postseason format so that all rounds were best-of-three. One year later, the conference appeared to have stabilized when they added Quebec–Chicoutimi. After being penalized for using an ineligible player in 1977, Laval suspended play for a full year before returning. In their absence, the conference expanded the final series into a best-of-five format. The addition of Ottawa in 1979 brought the conference nearly back to what they had at the start but the gains were short-lived.

In 1982, Bishop's suspended its program and Laval followed suit a year later. While the conference was barely holding together at this point, the playoffs were still expanded to be best-of-five for all series, though that format lasted for one tournament. After Quebec–Chicoutimi suspended its program in 1986, the conference lasted just one more year before all existing members were absorbed into the Ontario University Athletic Association. The final championship for the conference was a best-of-seven series.

== Tournaments ==
=== 1972 ===
Seed	School	Standings	Seed	School	Standings
1	Loyola	16–2–3	5	Montreal	10–7–4
2	Sir George Williams	13–6–2	6	Quebec–Trois-Rivières	7–10–4
3	Sherbrooke	12–6–3	7	Royal Military College	4–15–2
4	Bishop's	11–8–2	8	McGill	1–20–0

Semifinals; March 8
1	Loyola	5
4	Bishop's	3
2	Sir George Williams	6
3	Sherbrooke	3

Championship; March 10
1	Loyola	0
2	Sir George Williams	1

Note: * denotes overtime period(s)

=== 1973 ===
Seed	School	Standings	Seed	School	Standings
1	Sir George Williams	17–4–3	5	Royal Military College	9–12–3
2	Loyola	15–8–1	6	McGill	7–15–2
3	Bishop's	14–9–1	7	Quebec–Trois-Rivières	2–19–3
4	Sherbrooke	12–9–3			

Semifinals; March 2
1	Sir George Williams	9
4	Sherbrooke	4
2	Loyola	7
3	Bishop's	1

Championship; March 3
1	Sir George Williams	4
2	Loyola	7

Note: * denotes overtime period(s)

=== 1974 ===
Seed	School	Standings	Seed	School	Standings
T–1	Quebec–Trois-Rivières	14–2–2	5	McGill	6–10–2
T–1	Loyola	14–2–2	6	Bishop's	4–11–3
3	Sir George Williams	10–4–4	7	Macdonald	0–16–2
4	Sherbrooke	6–9–3			

Quarterfinals; February 20
3	Sir George Williams	9
6	Bishop's	1
4	Sherbrooke	6
5	McGill	5

Semifinals; February 22
1	Quebec–Trois-Rivières	5
4	Sherbrooke	8
2	Loyola	4
3	Sir George Williams	5

Championship; February 27–28
4	Sherbrooke	3	3	-
3	Sir George Williams	6	4	-

Note: * denotes overtime period(s)

=== 1975 ===
Seed	School	Standings
1	Loyola	16–2–2
2	Quebec–Trois-Rivières	13–3–4
3	Sir George Williams	8–9–3
4	McGill	7–11–2
5	Bishop's	0–19–1

Semifinals; February 26
1	Loyola	9
4	McGill	1
2	Quebec–Trois-Rivières	4
3	Sir George Williams	6

Championship; February 28-March 1
1	Loyola	5	6	-
3	Sir George Williams	1	2	-

Note: * denotes overtime period(s)

=== 1976 ===
Seed	School	Standings
1	Concordia	19–0–1
2	Quebec–Trois-Rivières	10–9–1
3	Laval	8–11–1
4	Bishop's	6–12–2
5	McGill	3–14–3

Semifinals; February 20-23
1	Concordia	10	13	-
4	Bishop's	2	0	-
2	Quebec–Trois-Rivières	6	5	3
3	Laval	3	6	5

Championship; February 25-27
1	Concordia	12	7	-
3	Laval	2	2	-

Note: * denotes overtime period(s)

=== 1977 ===
Seed	School	Standings	Seed	School	Standings
1	Concordia	17–2–1	4	Bishop's	7–12–1
2	Quebec–Trois-Rivières	16–2–2	T–5	McGill	3–13–4
3	Laval	6–10–4	T–5	Quebec–Chicoutimi	3–13–4

Note: Laval was barred from postseason play for using an ineligible player.

Semifinals
1	Concordia	12	8	-
4	McGill	1	1	-
2	Quebec–Trois-Rivières	8	8	-
3	Bishop's	3	0	-

Championship
1	Concordia	5	7	-
2	Quebec–Trois-Rivières	1	6	-

Note: * denotes overtime period(s)

=== 1978 ===
Seed	School	Standings
1	Concordia	12–4–0
2	Quebec–Trois-Rivières	11–4–1
3	McGill	9–5–2
4	Bishop's	4–12–0
5	Quebec–Chicoutimi	2–13–1

Semifinals; February 21-24
1	Concordia	8	8	-
4	Bishop's	5	1	-
2	Quebec–Trois-Rivières	4	5	-
3	McGill	2	4	-

Championship; March 1-10
1	Concordia	4	8	4	2	7
2	Quebec–Trois-Rivières	6	2	3	4	4

Note: * denotes overtime period(s)

=== 1979 ===
Seed	School	Standings	Seed	School	Standings
1	Concordia	18–2–0	4	McGill	9–9–2
T–2	Quebec–Chicoutimi	11–6–3	5	Quebec–Trois-Rivières	4–15–1
T–2	Laval	11–6–3	6	Bishop's	2–17–1

Semifinals; February 21-25
1	Concordia	7	6	-
4	McGill	6	2	-
2	Quebec–Chicoutimi	0	11	6
3	Laval	8	3	2

Championship; February 28-March 3
1	Concordia	7	8	8	-	-
2	Quebec–Chicoutimi	5	3	5	-	-

Note: * denotes overtime period(s)

=== 1980 ===
Seed	School	Standings	Seed	School	Standings
1	Quebec–Trois-Rivières	15–4–5	5	Quebec–Chicoutimi	8–10–6
2	Concordia	15–6–2	6	Laval	6–13–5
3	Ottawa	14–7–1	7	McGill	3–21–0
4	Bishop's	11–11–1			

Semifinals; February 27-29
1	Quebec–Trois-Rivières	7	8	-
4	Bishop's	2	2	-
2	Concordia	5	3	-
3	Ottawa	3	2	-

Championship; March 5-7
1	Quebec–Trois-Rivières	0	5	-
2	Concordia	5	8	-

Note: * denotes overtime period(s)

=== 1981 ===
Seed	School	Standings	Seed	School	Standings
1	Concordia	22–1–1	5	McGill	5–15–4
2	Ottawa	15–7–2	6	Quebec–Chicoutimi	5–17–2
3	Laval	15–9–0	7	Bishop's	3–19–2
4	Quebec–Trois-Rivières	13–10–1			

Semifinals; February 25-28
1	Concordia	7	5	-
4	Quebec–Trois-Rivières	2	2	-
2	Ottawa	5	2	3
3	Laval	3	3	2

Championship; March 4-6
1	Concordia	4	8	-
2	Ottawa	3	1	-

Note: * denotes overtime period(s)

=== 1982 ===
Seed	School	Standings	Seed	School	Standings
1	Concordia	21–2–1	5	McGill	9–15–0
2	Quebec–Trois-Rivières	16–8–0	6	Bishop's	5–14–5
3	Ottawa	13–9–2	7	Quebec–Chicoutimi	3–20–1
4	Laval	11–10–3			

Semifinals
1	Concordia	5	6	-
4	Laval	2	4	-
2	Quebec–Trois-Rivières	6	5	-
3	Ottawa	4	4	-

Championship
1	Concordia	3	5	7
2	Quebec–Trois-Rivières	5	3	2

Note: * denotes overtime period(s)

=== 1983 ===
Seed	School	Standings	Seed	School	Standings
1	Concordia	23–7–0	4	Quebec–Trois-Rivières	11–18–1
2	Laval	16–12–0	T–5	McGill	11–19–0
3	Quebec–Chicoutimi	16–13–1	T–5	Ottawa	10–18–2

Semifinals
1	Concordia	9	2	-
4	Quebec–Trois-Rivières	2	1	-
2	Laval	2	2	-
3	Quebec–Chicoutimi	6	6	-

Championship
1	Concordia	10	6	4	6	-
3	Quebec–Chicoutimi	0	1	7	2	-

Note: * denotes overtime period(s)

=== 1984 ===
Seed	School	Standings
1	Concordia	17–4–3
2	McGill	9–10–5
3	Ottawa	9–10–5
4	Quebec–Chicoutimi	8–12–4
5	Quebec–Trois-Rivières	8–15–1

Semifinals
1	Concordia	8	5	11	-	-
4	Quebec–Chicoutimi	3	2	3	-	-
2	McGill	5	5	9	2	-
3	Ottawa	6	10	5	3	-

Championship
1	Concordia	5	6	6	-	-
3	Ottawa	2	3	4	-	-

Note: * denotes overtime period(s)

=== 1985 ===
Seed	School	Standings
1	Quebec–Chicoutimi	14–3–3
2	Ottawa	10–8–2
3	Quebec–Trois-Rivières	8–10–2
4	McGill	8–10–1
5	Concordia	4–13–2

Semifinals
1	Quebec–Chicoutimi	6	6	-
4	McGill	2	3	-
2	Ottawa	2	8	7
3	Quebec–Trois-Rivières	3	6	2

Championship
1	Quebec–Chicoutimi	2	3	8	3	-
2	Ottawa	6	6	7	4	-

Note: * denotes overtime period(s)

=== 1986 ===
Seed	School	Standings
1	Quebec–Trois-Rivières	15–5–0
2	Ottawa	11–9–0
3	McGill	9–10–1
4	Concordia	7–12–1
5	Quebec–Chicoutimi	7–13–0

Semifinals
1	Quebec–Trois-Rivières	7	3	10
4	Concordia	2	6	2
2	Ottawa	5	2	6
3	McGill	3	5	4

Championship
1	Quebec–Trois-Rivières	9	3	3	6	-
2	Ottawa	8	2	7	5	-

Note: * denotes overtime period(s)

=== 1987 ===
Seed	School	Standings
1	Quebec–Trois-Rivières	14–2–2
2	Ottawa	13–4–1
3	McGill	4–12–2
4	Concordia	2–15–1

Semifinals					Championship
					1	Quebec–Trois-Rivières	8	3	6	5	-	-	-
2	Ottawa	3	1	2	3	McGill	0	1	4	4	-	-	-
3	McGill	1	6	3

Note: * denotes overtime period(s)

== Championships ==
School	Championships
Concordia	9
Loyola	2
Quebec–Trois-Rivières	2
Sir George Williams	2
Ottawa	1

== See also ==
- QOAA men's ice hockey tournament
- OSLC men's ice hockey tournament
- OUAA men's ice hockey tournament
- OUA men's ice hockey tournament
