= UQAC Inuk men's ice hockey =

- University: Université du Québec à Chicoutimi
- Conference: RSEQ
- First season: 1976–77
- Arena: Saguenay, Quebec
- Colors: Green, Black, and White

U Sports Tournament appearances
- 1979

Conference regular season championships
- 1985

The UQAC Inuk men's ice hockey team was a varsity ice hockey team that represented the Université du Québec à Chicoutimi. The team is currently a member of RSEQ Division II as a club team.

== History ==
UQAC began its ice hockey program in 1976, joining what was then called the Quebec Universities Athletic Association (QUAA). The Inuk spent most of its time yo-yoing up and down the standings. A runner-up finish in their third season resulted in the team receiving an at-large bid to the University Cup tournament where they performed well. Chicoutimi consistency problem led the team to be largely uncompetitive until the mid-80s when they won their first regular season championship. The very next season, the program finished last in the standings and the school decided to pull the plug.

The departure of UQAC precipitated the collapse of the QUAA's ice hockey division with the remaining clubs being absorbed into the Ontario University Athletic Association (OUAA) in 1987. 35 years later, UQAC returned to the ice as a member of RSEQ's reconstituted ice hockey division. As of 2024, the conference remains a probationary member of U Sports and is not eligible for tournament play.

== Season-by-season results ==
Note: GP = Games played, W = Wins, L = Losses, T = Ties, OTL = Overtime Losses, SOL = Shootout Losses, Pts = Points

U Sports Champion	U Sports Semifinalist	Conference regular season champions	Conference Division Champions	Conference Playoff Champions

Season	Conference	Regular Season													Conference Tournament Results	National Tournament Results
Season	Conference	Conference								Overall					Conference Tournament Results	National Tournament Results
Season	Conference	GP	W	L	T	OTL	SOL	Pts*	Finish	GP	W	L	T	%	Conference Tournament Results	National Tournament Results
1976–77	QUAA	20	3	13	4	–	–	10	6th	20	3	13	4	.250		
1977–78	QUAA	16	2	13	1	–	–	5	5th	16	2	13	1	.156		
1978–79	QUAA	20	11	6	3	–	–	25	T–2nd	28	14	11	3	.554	Won Semifinal series, 2–1 (Laval); Lost Championship series, 0–3 (Concordia)	Lost Group II Round-Robin, 7–2 (Guelph), 3–7 (Dalhousie)
1979–80	QUAA	24	8	10	6	–	–	22	5th	24	8	10	6	.458		
1980–81	QUAA	24	5	17	2	–	–	12	6th	24	5	17	2	.250		
1981–82	QUAA	24	3	20	1	–	–	7	7th	24	3	20	1	.146		
1982–83	QUAA	30	16	13	1	–	–	33	3rd	36	19	16	1	.542	Won Semifinal series, 2–0 (Laval); Lost Championship series, 1–3 (Concordia)	
1983–84	QUAA	24	8	12	4	–	–	20	4th	27	8	15	4	.370	Lost Semifinal series, 0–3 (Concordia)	
1984–85	QUAA	20	14	3	3	–	–	31	1st	26	17	6	3	.712	Won Semifinal series, 2–0 (McGill); Lost Championship series, 1–3 (Ottawa)	
1985–86	QUAA	20	7	13	0	–	–	15	5th	20	7	13	0	.350		
Totals										GP	W	L	T/SOL	%	Championships	
Regular Season										233	78	120	25	.406	1 QUAA Championship	
Conference Post-season										20	7	13	0	.350		
U Sports Postseason										2	1	1	0	.500	1 National tournament appearances	
Regular Season and Postseason Record										255	86	134	25	.402		
