= 2025 U Sports University Cup =

Canadian university ice hockey championship

Tournament details
- City: Ottawa
- Venue: TD Place Arena
- Dates: March 20–23, 2025
- Teams: 8

Final positions
- Champions: Ottawa Gee-Gees (1st title)
- Runners-up: Concordia Stingers
- Third place: Saskatchewan Huskies
- Fourth place: Toronto Metropolitan Bold

Awards
- MVP: Francesco Lapenna (Ottawa)

The 2025 U Sports University Cup, the 63rd edition, was held from March 20 to March 23, 2025, in Ottawa, Ontario, to determine a national champion for the 2024–25 U Sports men's ice hockey season. The eighth-seeded host Ottawa Gee-Gees defeated the third-seeded OUA champion Concordia Stingers in the gold medal match to win the first national championship in program history.

== Host ==
The tournament was played at TD Place Arena and was hosted by the University of Ottawa. This was the first time that the University of Ottawa hosted the tournament and it was the first time that the championship was in Ottawa.

TD Place Arena is part of the City of Ottawa's Lansdowne Park complex and is home to the Ottawa 67's of the OHL and the Ottawa Charge of the PWHL. The base seating capacity is 5,500 with an upper limit of 8,585.

== Qualification ==
=== AUS playoffs ===
Quarterfinals
3	Saint Mary's	3**	4	-
6	Prince Edward Island	2	1	-
4	St. Francis Xavier	1	4	-
5	Acadia	2	6	-

Semifinals
1	New Brunswick	5	7	4	-	-
4	Acadia	2	1	1	-	-
2	Moncton	9	2	3	5	5
3	Saint Mary's	2	3	7	1	3

Championship
1	New Brunswick	5	3	-
2	Moncton	3	2	-

Note: * denotes overtime period(s)

=== OUA playoffs ===
Division Quarterfinals; February 19–23
E3	Ottawa	3*	3*	-
E6	Ontario Tech	2	2	-
E4	McGill	2	5	-
E5	Quebec–Trois-Rivières	1	2	-
W3	Windsor	5*	5	-
W6	Waterloo	4	3	-
W4	Western Ontario	2	2	2
W5	Lakehead	1	3	5

Division Semifinals; February 26–March 1
E1	Concordia	1	5	5
E4	McGill	6	1	4
East
E2	Queen's	4	7	-
E3	Ottawa	3	3	-
W1	Toronto Metropolitan	3*	3	-
W5	Lakehead	2	0	-
West
W2	Toronto	5	4	-
W3	Windsor	2	2	-

Division Finals; March 5–9
E1	Concordia	2	1	-
E2	Queens	1	0	-
W1	Toronto Metropolitan	2	5	2
W2	Toronto	3	4	1

Queen's Cup Final; March 15
E1	Concordia	4
W1	Toronto Metropolitan	1
Bronze Medal Game
E2	Queen's	4
W2	Toronto	0

Note: * denotes overtime period(s)

=== Canada West playoffs ===
Quarterfinal
E2	Alberta	2*	2	4
W3	Calgary	1	3	1
W2	British Columbia	2	3	4
E3	MacEwan	3*	1	3

Semifinal
W1	Mount Royal	3*	0	4
E2	Alberta	2	6	2
E1	Saskatchewan	4	3	4
W2	British Columbia	5*	2	2

Championship
W1	Mount Royal	3	2*	0
E1	Saskatchewan	6	1	3

Note: * denotes overtime period(s)

== Participating teams ==
Seed	Team	Qualified	Record	Last App	Total	Last Win	Total
1	New Brunswick Reds	AUS Champion	28–1–1	2024	23nd	2024	10
2	Saskatchewan Huskies	CW Champion	23–5–0	2020	23rd	1983	1
3	Concordia Stingers	OUA Champion	21–5–2	2023	11th	None	0
4	Toronto Metropolitan Bold	OUA Finalist	17–10–1	2024	3rd	None	0
5	Mount Royal Cougars	CW Finalist	22–6–0	None	1st	None	0
6	Moncton Aigles Bleus	AUS Finalists	19-9–2	2024	17th	1995	4
7	Queen's Gaels	OUA Bronze	22–6–0	2019	4th	None	0
8	Ottawa Gee-Gees	OUA Semifinalist (host)	19–6–3	2020	4th	None	0

== Bracket ==
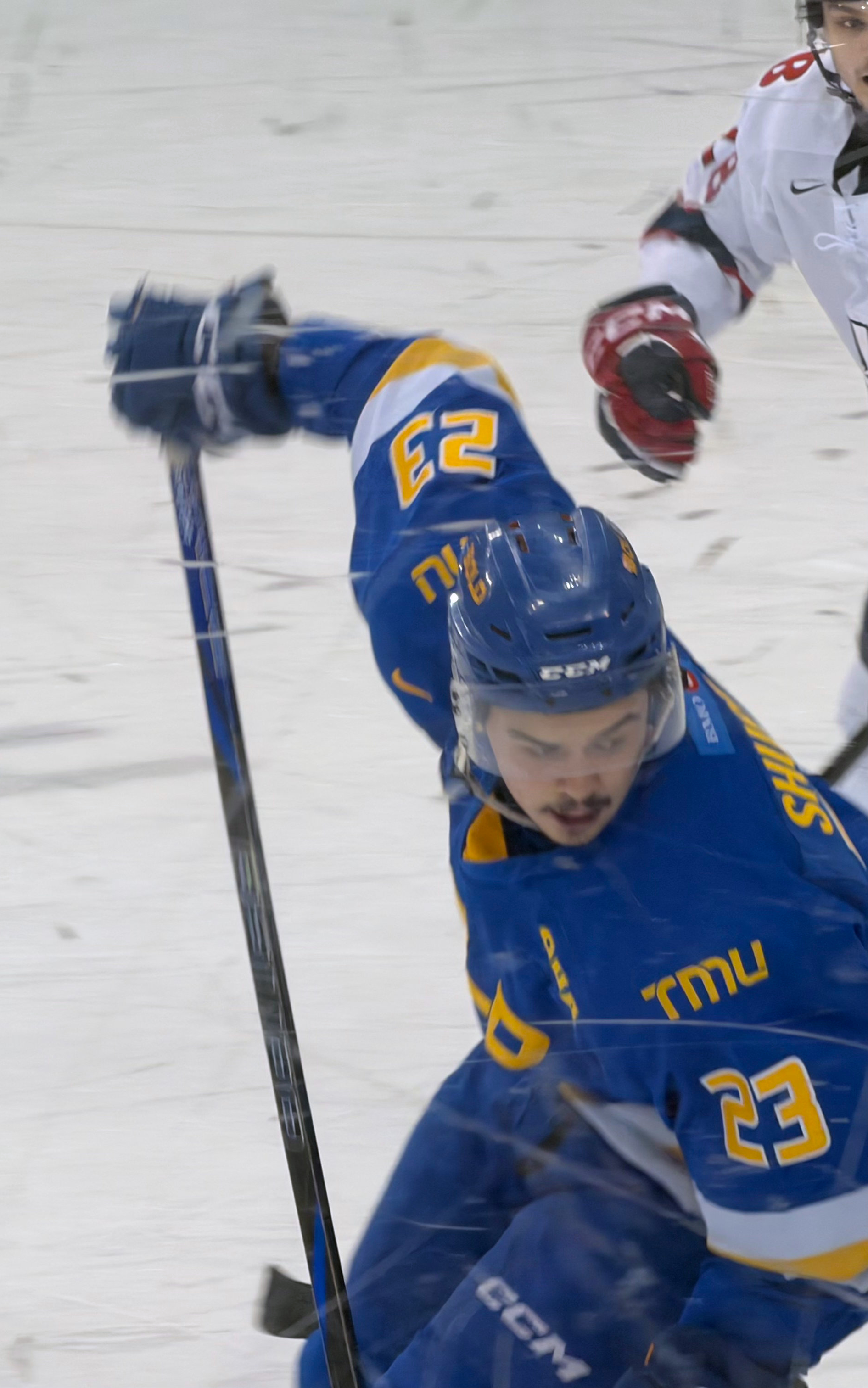
TMU Bold's Spencer Shugrue (pictured in 2026) scored the game-winning goal against the Mount Royal Cougars in fifth overtime

First Round: March 20–21
1	New Brunswick	2
8	Ottawa	3*
4	Toronto Metropolitan	5*****
5	Mount Royal	4
2	Saskatchewan	4
7	Queen's	2
3	Concordia	4
6	Moncton	2

Semi-Finals: March 22
8	Ottawa	4
4	Toronto Metropolitan	3
2	Saskatchewan	0
3	Concordia	3

Gold Medal Game: March 23
8	Ottawa	3
3	Concordia	2
Bronze Medal Game: March 23
4	Toronto Metropolitan	1
2	Saskatchewan	4

Note: * denotes overtime period(s)

The quarterfinals game between TMU and Mount Royal set the record as the longest USPORTS men's hockey game in history, with a final time of 143 minutes and 33 seconds (60+20+20+20+20+3:33). The five overtime periods broke the USPORTS record set in a 2016 Saskatchewan-Carleton playoff game of 116:11 (60+10+20+20+6:11).

Previous Long Games:

Time	Date	Away team	Home team	Tournament	Result
116:11	March 17, 2016	Carleton Ravens	Saskatchewan Huskies	University Cup, Quarterfinal #1	Saskatchewan won 3–2
111:53	February 27, 2011	Acadia Axemen	New Brunswick Varsity Reds	AUS Playoffs, Game 2	New Brunswick won 3–2
107:35	March 18, 2016	St. Francis Xavier X-Men	Saskatchewan Huskies	University Cup, Semifinal #1	St. Francis Xavier won 2–1
103:17	March 25, 2002	Western Ontario Mustangs	Quebec-Trois-Rivières Patriotes	University Cup Championship	Western Ontario won 4–3

== Results ==
=== Quarterfinals ===
March 20, 2025; 1:00 PM (local); CBC Gem	(4) Toronto Metropolitan	5 – 4 (5OT) (1–1, 1–2, 2–1, 0–0, 0–0, 0–0, 0–0, 1–0)	(5) Mount Royal	TD Place Arena – Ottawa, Ontario; Attendance: 250

Game reference

Kai Edmonds
Goalies
Shane Farkas
Referees:
Dominic Cadeaux
Tyson Stewart
Linesmen:
Max Bedard
Shawn Oliver

	0–1	09:19 – Clay Hanus (1) (Patton, Bouchard)
(D'Intonio) Jaden Condotta (1) – PP – 18:07	1–1
	1–2	25:38 – Spencer Moe (1) (Wiens, Hanus)
	1–3	38:43 – Teague Patton (1) (Bouchard, Hanus)
(Bowie, Brand) Kevin Gursoy (1) – 39:36	2–3
	2–4	41:01 – Teague Patton (2) (Bouchard, Hanus)
(Ianniello, Bowie) Ian Martin (1) – 46:37	3–4
(Ianniello) Daniil Grigorev (1) – 51:20	4–4
Spencer Shugrue (1) – 143:33	5–4

12 min
Penalties
12 min
70
Shots
69

March 20, 2025; 7:00 PM (local); CBC Gem	(1) New Brunswick	2 – 3 (OT) (1–0, 0–1, 1–1, 0–1)	(8) Ottawa	TD Place Arena – Ottawa, Ontario; Attendance: 1,650

Game reference

Samuel Richard
Goalies
Francesco Lapenna
Referee:
Tanner Doiron
Linesmen:
Spencer Knox
Mitchell Gibbs

(Reynolds, Sproule) Benjamin Corbeil (1) – 13:06	1–0
	1–1	35:39 – PP – Marc-Antoine Séguin (1) (Poulin)
(MacKay) Cody Morgan (1) – PP – 48:08	2–1
	2–2	58:31 – Peter Stratis (1) (Labelle)
	2–3	76:04 – Marc-Antoine Séguin (2) (Martin, Poulin)

14 min
Penalties
8 min
43
Shots
22

March 21, 2025; 1:00 PM (local); CBC Gem	(3) Concordia	4 – 2 (1–1, 1–0, 0–3)	(6) Moncton	TD Place Arena – Ottawa, Ontario; Attendance: 421

Game reference

Nikolas Hurtubise
Goalies
Nathan Darveau
Referee:
Tanner Doiron
Linesmen:
Max Ferland
Spencer Knox

	0–1	05:54 – Charles-Édouard Drouin (1) (Lapointe, Toner)
(Girouard, Inniss) Simon Lavigne (1) – 14:04	1–1
	1–2	Jacob Dion (1) – 23:03
(Lavigne, Lavoie) Charles Savoie (1) – 46:14	2–2
(Agostino) Édouard Charron (1) – 46:49	3–2
(Bizier, Lavigne) Nicholas Girouard (1) – EN – 58:33	4–2

2 min
Penalties
0 min
21
Shots
17

March 21, 2025; 7:00 PM (local); CBC Gem	(2) Saskatchewan	4 – 2 (1–2, 2–0, 1–0)	(7) Queen's	TD Place Arena – Ottawa, Ontario; Attendance: 585

Game reference

Roddy Ross
Goalies
Christian Purboo
Referee:
Dominik Cadieux
Linesmen:
Maxime Bedard
Mitchell Gibbs

	0–1	01:42 – Liam Tanner (1) (Duff, Lalonde)
(Petruic, Keeler) Dawson Holt (1) – PP – 07:13	1–1
	1–2	10:13 – PP – Nolan Hutcheson (1) (Katzalay, Tolnai)
(Loschiavo, Petruic) Dawson Holt (2) – 25:18	2–2
(Wong, Bertholet) Justin Ball (1) – PP – 34:23	3–2
(Holt, Keeler) Ethan Regnier (1) – EN – 59:50	4–2

4 min
Penalties
8 min
23
Shots
40

=== Semifinals ===
March 22, 2025; 1:00 PM (local); CBC Gem	(4) Toronto Metropolitan	3 – 4 (1–0, 2–2, 1–1)	(8) Ottawa	TD Place Arena – Ottawa, Ontario; Attendance: 1,453

Game reference

Kai Edmonds
Goalies
Francesco Lapenna
Referees:
Taylor Burzminski
Tanner Doiron
Linesmen:
Maxime Bedard
Spencer Knox

	0–1	14:04 – PP – Mitch Martin (1) (Clavelle, Séguin)
(Ianniello, Condotta) Jordan D'Intino (1) – 11:52	1–1
(Brand, Playfair) Ian Martin (2) – 33:24	2–1
	2–2	34:04 – Bradley Chenier (1) (Belchamber, Roy)
	2–3	39:05 – Vincent Labelle (1) (Lafrance, Roy)
(Gursoy, Condotta) Tyler Savard (1) – 54:46	3–3
	3–4	59:18 – Mitch Martin (2) (Roy, Labelle)

6 min
Penalties
3 min
33
Shots
29

March 22, 2025; 7:00 PM (local); CBC Gem	(2) Saskatchewan	0 – 3 (0–0, 0–0, 0–3)	(3) Concordia	TD Place Arena – Ottawa, Ontario; Attendance: 603

Game reference

Roddy Ross
Goalies
Nikolas Hurtubise
Referee:
Brendan Kane
Linesmen:
Shawn Oliver
Maxime Bedard

0–1	45:10 – PP – Julien Anctil (1) (Larochelle, Bizier)
0–2	59:01 – EN – Julien Anctil (2) (Bizier)
0–3	59:18 – EN – Alexandre Nadeau (1)

34 min
Penalties
30 min
19
Shots
30

=== Gold Medal Game ===
March 23, 2025; 5:00 PM (local); CBC Gem	(3) Concordia	2 – 3 (0–2, 0–1, 2–0)	(8) Ottawa	TD Place Arena – Ottawa, Ontario; Attendance: 3,796

Game reference

Nikolas Hurtubise
Goalies
Francesco Lapenna
Referee:
Tanner Burzminski
Linesmen:
Sean Oliver
Mitchell Gibbs

	0–1	09:56 – Vincent Labelle (2) – (Roy, McMaster)
	0–2	13:57 – Bradley Chenier (2) – (Martin)
	0–3	23:06 – Luka Verreault (1) – (Martin, Labelle)
(Anctil, Lavigne) Sean Larochelle (1) – PP – 57:31	1–3
(Lavigne, Larochelle) Mathieu Bizier (1) – 18:36	2–3

20 min
Penalties
22 min
33
Shots
14

Game MVPs: Franky Lapenna (Ottawa) & Sean Larochelle (Concordia)

=== Bronze Medal Game ===
March 23, 2025; 11:00 AM (local); CBC Gem	(2) Saskatchewan	4 – 1 (0–0, 2–1, 2–0)	(4) Toronto Metropolitan	TD Place Arena – Ottawa, Ontario; Attendance: 499

Game reference

Roddy Ross
Goalies
Kai Edmonds
Referee:
Dannick Caron
Linesmen:
Max Bedard
Max Ferland

(Bertholet, Wong) Justin Ball (1) – PP – 30:58	1–0
(Pelletier, Stebbings) Landon Kosior (1) – 36:02	2–0
	2–1	47:06 – PP – Kevin Gursoy (2) – (Ianniello, Bowie)
(Kosior, Keeler) Vince Loschiavo (1) – PP – 57:50	3–1
(Ball) Vince Loschiavo (2) – 59:21	4–1

31 min
Penalties
54 min
24
Shots
18

Game MVPs: Justin Ball (Saskatchewan) & Kai Edmonds (Toronto Metropolitan)

== Awards ==
The Major W.J. 'Danny' McLeod Award for U Sports University Cup MVP was awarded to Ottawa goaltender Francesco Lapenna who finished the tournament with a 3-0 record, GAA of 2.14 and SAV% of 0.936.

Tournament all-star team were:
Forward: Mathieu Bizier (Concordia)
Forward: Dawson Holt (Saskatchewan)
Forward: Marc-Antoine Séguin (Ottawa)
Defenceman: Simon Lavigne (Concordia)
Defenceman: Joseph Ianniello (Toronto Metropolitan)
Goaltender: Francesco Lapenna (Ottawa)
