= Montreal Carabins men's ice hockey =

- University: Université de Montréal
- First season: 1907 (disestablished in 1972)
- Arena: Montreal, Quebec
- Colors: Royal Blue, White, and Black

U Sports tournament appearances
- 1964

Conference tournament champions
- 1965

The Montreal Carabins men's ice hockey team was an ice hockey team representing the Montreal Carabins athletics program of the Université de Montréal. The program was one of the earliest college teams in Canada, however, it has been dormant since 1972.

== History ==
While the school was still operating as the 'Université Laval à Montréal' (University of Laval at Montreal), the athletic department signed off on the first official ice hockey team in 1907. Laval–Montreal joined three other teams already competing in the Canadian Intercollegiate Athletic Union (CIAU) but had a difficult time catching up to McGill, Queen's and Toronto. After a few years, the conference got a fifth member, Ottawa, and Laval–Montreal was paired with the new club in a second division. The two year experiment failed to produce any positive results for Montreal and the program was suspended in 1912. During World War I, Laval–Montreal brought its hockey team back and played in the Montreal City Hockey League (MCHL) for several years. The club's best year during this stretch was in 1916 when they won the regular season title and finished as the postseason runners-up. Laval–Montreal withdrew from the league prior to the start of the 1918–19 season and suspended play for a second time.

Since renamed Université de Montréal, the Carabins resurfaced in 1923 and rejoined the CIAU. Over the next 17 years, the team did not find much success. With the CIAU dominated by McGill and Toronto, Montreal more often than not finished last in the 3-team league and never came close to winning a title. The Carabins withdrew from the conference in 1928 and decided to stick to senior play instead. From 1927 on, the team was a member of the Montreal Senior Group, the successor to the MCHL. After a good first season, the club hit hard times. After poor results to finish out the decade, the club suspended play in 1931 due to the Great Depression. They returned the following year before returning to the CIAU in 1933. After going winless in two seasons, the team was cut again for budgetary reasons.

In 1937, Montreal returned and was invited to join an international conference, comprising their three old CIAU foes as well as four Ivy League schools from the United States. The International Intercollegiate League (IIL) was designed to drive up interest in college hockey on both sides of the border but it only partially succeeded in its aims. While American fans were more than happy to show up for the games, the Canadian teams found it to be far more difficult to sell tickets for their home matches. Regardless of the causes, the league proved to be a financial drain on the Canadian teams, exacerbating the problems already faced by Montreal. To make matters worse, the Carabins were the only Canadian club to routinely lose to their American counterparts and finished last in consecutive years. Montreal suspended play in 1939 after the outbreak of World War II and remained dormant for its duration.

The Carabins returned to the ice in 1945 and, at least for the first few seasons, looked to be in the same sad state as before. However, In 1949, Montreal had a surprising turnaround and won its first conference championship. They then played top-rated Dartmouth in the final installment of the Thompson Trophy and defeated the Indians 4–3. Montreal repeated as CIAU champions the next year and won another pair in the early 50s. While Montreal wasn't able to keep up that pace, they remained a solid team for the rest of the decade.

After a few bad years in the early 60s, Montreal bounced back with a strong campaign in 1964. Their performance earned them an appearance in the second University Cup where they finished last out of four teams. Montreal had a better year in 1965, winning the Quebec–Ontario Athletic Association (QOAA) playoff and received an invitation back to the University Cup, however, they declined to participate. The Carabins played well over the succeeding six years but were only twice able to make a playoff appearance. In both cases they lost their opening match and were eliminated. 1971 saw Canadian college hockey restructured with the four conferences that were spread across Ontario and Quebec realigned into two provincial leagues. Montreal was placed in the Quebec Universities Athletic Association (QUAA), the forerunner of the Réseau du sport étudiant du Québec (RSEQ). Despite a solid performance, they finished just outside the postseason. Unfortunately, the team was unable to improve on their performance because the school decided to cancel the program. Montreal was not alone in their choice as many Quebec schools would eliminate their men's teams over the next several years.

=== Intermediate and junior hockey ===
Concurrent with its varsity team, Montreal also fielded an intermediate (junior varsity) team for several years. The second team operated for a few years in the 10s and 20s but was continually active from 1928 through 1939 before suspending for good. The university also briefly fielded junior teams for players 20 years older and under. The junior program was run from 1923 until 1928, aside from 1927 when they did not field a team.

== Season-by-season results ==
=== Senior and collegiate play ===
Note: GP = Games played, W = Wins, L = Losses, T = Ties, Pts = Points

Extra-League Champion	U Sports Semifinalist	Conference regular season champions	Conference Division Champions	Conference Playoff Champions

Season	Conference	Regular Season											Conference Tournament Results	National Tournament Results
Season	Conference	Conference						Overall					Conference Tournament Results	National Tournament Results
Season	Conference	GP	W	L	T	Pts*	Finish	GP	W	L	T	%	Conference Tournament Results	National Tournament Results
Senior and Collegiate Hockey
1907–08	CIAU	6	2	4	0	4	3rd	?	?	?	?	?		
1908–09	CIAU	6	1	4	1	3	4th	?	?	?	?	?		
1909–10	CIAU	6	0	6	0	0	4th	?	?	?	?	?		
1910–11	CIAU	2	2	0	0	4	1st	?	?	?	?	?		Lost Championship series, 11–21 (Toronto)
1911–12	CIAU	2	1	1	0	2	T–2nd	?	?	?	?	?		
Program suspended
1914–15	MCHL	10	3	6	1	7	4th	?	?	?	?	?		
1915–16	MCHL	10	7	1	2	16	1st	?	?	?	?	?	Lost Championship, 1–3 (Montreal AAA)	
1916–17	MCHL	10	4	4	2	10	3rd	?	?	?	?	?		
1917–18	MCHL	10	4	6	0	8	4th	?	?	?	?	?		
Program suspended
1922–23	CIAU	6	2	4	0	4	4th	?	?	?	?	?		
1923–24	CIAU	6	1	4	1	3	4th	?	?	?	?	?		
1924–25	CIAU	5	2	3	0	4	3rd	?	?	?	?	?		
1925–26	CIAU	6	3	3	0	6	2nd	?	?	?	?	?		
1926–27	CIAU	6	2	4	0	4	3rd	?	?	?	?	?		
1927–28	CIAU	4	1	3	0	2	3rd	?	?	?	?	?		
1927–28	MSG	9	4	2	3	11	2nd	?	?	?	?	?		
1928–29	MSG	8	2	5	1	5	5th	?	?	?	?	?		
1929–30	MSG	10	1	9	0	2	6th	?	?	?	?	?		
Program suspended
1931–32	MSG	11	0	9	2	2	5th	?	?	?	?	?		
1932–33	CIAU	4	0	4	0	0	3rd	?	?	?	?	?		
Program suspended
1936–37	CIAU	6	2	4	0	4	3rd	?	?	?	?	?		
1936–37	IIL ^{†}	10	5	5	0	10	4th	?	?	?	?	?		
1937–38	CIAU	6	0	6	0	0	4th	?	?	?	?	?		
1937–38	IIL	10	1	9	0	2	8th	?	?	?	?	?		
1938–39	CIAU	6	0	6	0	0	4th	?	?	?	?	?		
1938–39	IIL	10	0	10	0	0	8th	?	?	?	?	?		
Program suspended
1945–46	CIAU	6	2	4	0	4	3rd	?	?	?	?	?		
1946–47	CIAU	9	3	4	2	8	3rd	?	?	?	?	?		
1947–48	CIAU	12	2	10	0	4	4th	?	?	?	?	?		
1948–49	CIAU	12	10	2	0	20	1st	?	?	?	?	?		
1949–50	CIAU	12	11	1	0	22	1st	?	?	?	?	?		
1950–51	CIAU	6	3	2	1	7	2nd	?	?	?	?	?		
1951–52	CIAU	12	8	3	1	17	1st	?	?	?	?	?		
1952–53	CIAU	12	7	4	1	15	1st	?	?	?	?	?		
1953–54	CIAU/QOAA ^{¿}	12	7	5	0	14	2nd	?	?	?	?	?		
Totals								GP	W	L	T	%	Championships	
Regular Season								?	?	?	?	?	5 CIAU Championships, 1 MCHL Championship	
Conference Post-season								?	?	?	?	?		
Regular Season and Postseason Record								?	?	?	?	?		

† The International Intercollegiate League (IIL) was a joint venture between Canadian and American colleges.
¿ Sometime between 1953 and 1955 the CIAU changed their name to QOAA (Quebec-Ontario Athletic Association).

=== Collegiate only ===
Note: GP = Games played, W = Wins, L = Losses, T = Ties, OTL = Overtime Losses, SOL = Shootout Losses, Pts = Points

U Sports Champion	U Sports Semifinalist	Conference regular season champions	Conference Division Champions	Conference Playoff Champions

Season	Conference	Regular Season													Conference Tournament Results	National Tournament Results
Season	Conference	Conference								Overall					Conference Tournament Results	National Tournament Results
Season	Conference	GP	W	L	T	OTL	SOL	Pts*	Finish	GP	W	L	T	%	Conference Tournament Results	National Tournament Results
1954–55	QOAA	12	4	7	1	–	–	9	3rd	12	4	7	1	.375		
1955–56	QOAA	12	4	8	0	–	–	8	T–3rd	12	4	8	0	.333		
1956–57	QOAA	12	4	8	0	–	–	8	T–3rd	12	4	8	0	.333		
1957–58	QOAA	12	6	6	0	–	–	12	2nd	12	6	6	0	.500		
1958–59	QOAA	12	4	6	2	–	–	10	3rd	12	4	6	2	.417		
1959–60	QOAA	14	2	10	2	–	–	6	5th	14	2	10	2	.214		
1960–61	QOAA	12	5	7	0	–	–	10	3rd	12	5	7	0	.417		
1961–62	QOAA	12	3	9	0	–	–	6	7th	12	3	9	0	.250		
1962–63	QOAA	12	1	10	1	–	–	3	8th	12	1	10	1	.125		
1963–64	QOAA	12	7	2	3	–	–	17	2nd	14	7	4	3	.607		Lost Semifinal, 1–4 (Sir George Williams); Lost Consolation Game, 6–8 (New Brunswick)
1964–65	QOAA	16	13	3	0	–	–	26	2nd	18	15	3	0	.833	Won Semifinal, 5–4 (Western Ontario); Won Championship, 4–3 (Queen's)	
1965–66	QOAA	16	5	11	0	–	–	10	7th	16	5	11	0	.313		
1966–67	QOAA	16	5	9	2	–	–	12	T–6th	16	5	9	2	.375		
1967–68	QOAA	16	9	6	1	–	–	19	4th	17	9	7	1	.559	Lost Semifinal, 3–4 (Toronto)	
1968–69	QOAA	15	9	5	1	–	–	19	5th	15	9	5	1	.633		
1969–70	QOAA	15	9	5	1	–	–	19	4th	16	9	6	1	.594	Lost Semifinal, 0–11 (Toronto)	
1970–71	QOAA	15	7	5	3	–	–	17	T–5th	15	7	5	3	.567		
1971–72	QUAA	21	10	7	4	–	–	24	5th	21	10	7	4	.571		
Program suspended
Totals										GP	W	L	T/SOL	%	Championships	
Regular Season										252	107	124	21	.466		
Conference Post-season										4	2	2	0	.500	1 QOAA Championship	
U Sports Postseason										2	0	2	0	.000	1 National tournament appearance	
Regular Season and Postseason Record										258	109	128	21	.463		

Note: Totals include results from 1954–55 onward.

== See also ==
Montreal Carabins women's ice hockey
