= Guelph Gryphons men's ice hockey =

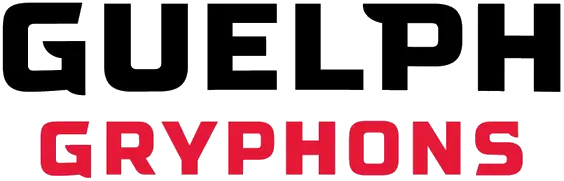
- University: University of Guelph
- Conference: OUA; OUA West Division
- Head coach: Josh Dixon; Since 2023–24 season
- Assistant coaches: Dave Leger; Scott Simmonds; Alec Bowes; Nick Dahan
- Arena: Gryphon Centre; Guelph, Ontario
- Colors: Red, Gold, and Black

U Sports tournament champions
- 1997

U Sports tournament appearances
- 1976, 1979, 1980, 1993, 1994, 1995, 1997, 2002, 2015, 2019, 2020

Conference tournament champions
- 1976, 1979, 1980, 1994, 1997, 2015, 2020

The Guelph Gryphons men's ice hockey team is an active ice hockey program representing the Guelph Gryphons athletic department of the University of Guelph. The team has been active since the formation of the college in 1964 and is currently a member of the Ontario University Athletics conference under the authority of U Sports. The Gryphons play at the Gryphon Centre in Guelph, Ontario.

== History ==
=== Early years ===
One of Guelph's predecessor schools, the Ontario Agricultural College, began fielding an ice hockey team at least as far back as 1898. As a small school, OAC played at the intermediate level of the Ontario Hockey Association but only did so sparingly. In the early 20th century, the Redmen also played in the Intermediate Intercollegiate Series but, as most colleges did, suspended play for the duration of World War I. After the war, OAC would play off an on for much of the 1920s and 30s. In the early 40s, the team attempted to play through World War II but eventually suspended play in 1945.

=== Return to play ===
In 1950, Ontario Agricultural College resumed play but remained an independent program. Its unclear at this time whether or not the school still operated at the intermediate level or if they had joined the senior level of college hockey yet. OAC soldiered on with their club for over a decade before finally joining the Quebec–Ontario Athletic Association in 1961. The team played for two seasons before sitting out the 1964 years while the University of Guelph was being formed.

=== Ontario Veterinary College ===
There is some indication that the Ontario Veterinary College played as a member of the Ontario Intercollegiate Athletic Association in 1964. Records from Toronto Metropolitan include two matches against 'OAVC' in 1964, which could have been a combined team from OAC and OVC. In any event, the league played at the intermediate level and is not officially recognized by the university.

=== Guelph ===
Once the first official team from Guelph hit the ice, the Gryphons found themselves with a tough row to hoe. The new club rejoined the QOAA and saw lean years for the duration of the 1960s. It wasn't until 1970 that the Gryphons were able to get out of the conference cellar and they weren't able to produce a winning season until 1972, the first year of play in the OUAA. Over the course of the 70s, Guelph steadily improved and the team won its first league championship in 1976. Guelph finished as runners-up for the national title that year and returned to the tournament in both 1979 and 1980. Afterwards, the program flagged and saw mostly losing seasons until the early 1990s.

=== Championship ===
The Gryphons rebuilt into a powerhouse, routinely winning their division while making several trips to the league final. Guelph won two OUAA championships in the mid-90s and appeared in 4 national tournaments in 5 years. Their successful run culminated with the 1997 CIAU championship. Afterwards, Guelph remained a strong team in the conference but they spent most of the next 20 years failing to make the national series. In 2015, Guelph won a stunning league championship despite having a losing record in the regular season. The Gryphons continued their inspired run and finished with the bronze medal at the 2015 CIS University Cup. Before the decade was out, Guelph made two more appearances in the national tournament but neither saw them win a game.

== Season-by-season results ==
=== Intermediate and collegiate play ===
Note: GP = Games played, W = Wins, L = Losses, T = Ties, Pts = Points

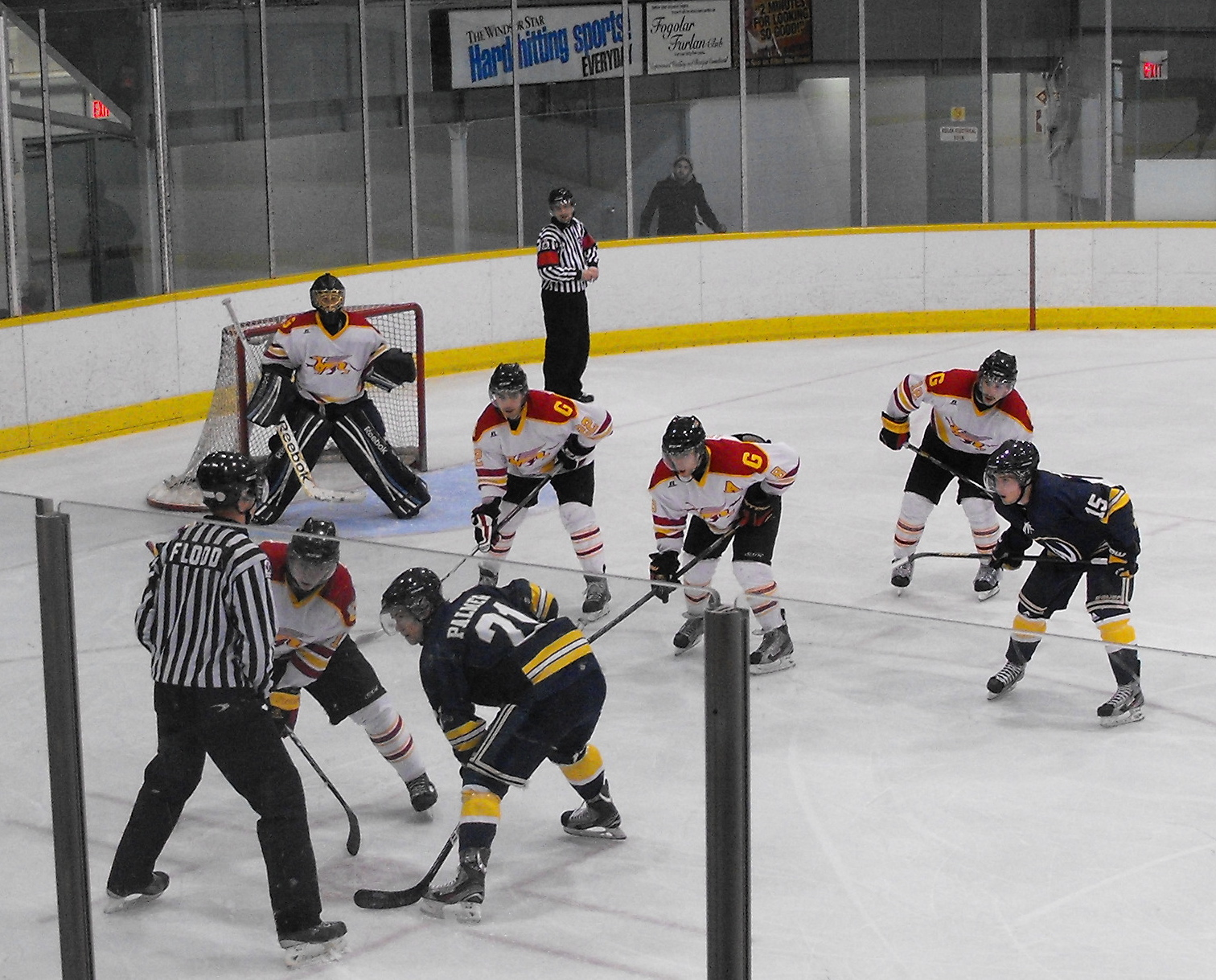
Men's Gryphons in action against Windsor (2012–13)

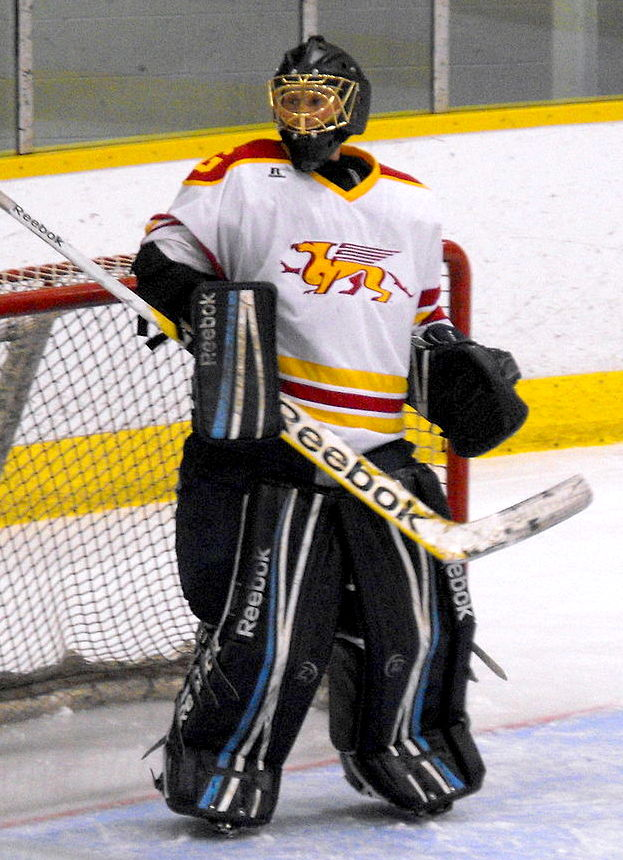
Men's Gryphons goalie during 2012-13 hockey season

Extra-League Champion	U Sports Semifinalist	Conference regular season champions	Conference Division Champions	Conference Playoff Champions

Season	Conference	Regular Season											Conference Tournament Results	National Tournament Results
Season	Conference	Conference						Overall					Conference Tournament Results	National Tournament Results
Season	Conference	GP	W	L	T	Pts*	Finish	GP	W	L	T	%	Conference Tournament Results	National Tournament Results
Intermediate Hockey
1898–99	OHA	0	0	0	0	0	?	?	?	?	?	?	Lost Third Round series, 10–19 (Guelph)	
Program suspended
Intermediate and Collegiate Hockey
1906–07	IIS	0	0	0	0	0	–	?	?	?	?	?	Lost Semifinal series, 6–28 (Toronto II)	
1907–08	IIS	0	0	0	0	0	–	?	?	?	?	?	Lost Quarterfinal series, 2–15 (Toronto II)	
1908–09	OHAI	8	1	7	0	2	–	?	?	?	?	?		
1909–10	OHAI	6	0	6	0	0	–	?	?	?	?	?		
Program suspended
1911–12	OHAI	8	4	4	0	8	–	?	?	?	?	?		
Program suspended
1913–14	OHAI	8	3	5	0	6	–	?	?	?	?	?		
1914–15	IIS	0	0	0	0	0	–	?	?	?	?	?	Lost West Round-Robin, 2-6 (McMaster), 1–12 (Toronto II)	
Program suspended
1918–19	OHAI	5	2	3	0	4	–	?	?	?	?	?		
1919–20	IIS	5	1	4	0	2	–	?	?	?	?	?		
1920–21	IIS	?	?	?	?	?	?	?	?	?	?	?		
Program suspended
1922–23	IIS	0	0	0	0	0	–	?	?	?	?	?	Lost Semifinal series, 1–7 (Toronto II)	
Program suspended
1925–26	IIS	4	0	3	1	1	–	?	?	?	?	?		
Program suspended
1927–28	IIS	6	2	3	1	5	–	?	?	?	?	?		
1928–29	OHAI	7	4	3	0	8	?	?	?	?	?	?	Won Group 7 Semifinal series, 6–5 (Fergus); Lost Group 7 Championship series, 3–5 (Elora)	
1929–30	OHAI	6	3	3	0	6	?	?	?	?	?	?	Won Section A Semifinal, 3–2 (Hespeler); Lost Section A Championship series, 4–11 (Elora)	
1930–31	IIS	6	3	3	0	6	–	?	?	?	?	?		
1930–31	OHA	6	3	3	0	6	?	?	?	?	?	?		
1931–32	IIS	5	2	3	0	6	?	?	?	?	?	?		
1932–33	IIS	6	1	5	0	2	?	?	?	?	?	?		
Program suspended
1935–36	OHAI	4	0	4	0	0	?	?	?	?	?	?		
Program suspended
1937–38	IIS	5	1	3	1	3	?	?	?	?	?	?		
1938–39	IIS	6	4	1	1	9	2nd	?	?	?	?	?		
Program suspended due to World War II
1941–42	OHAI	3	0	3	0	0	?	?	?	?	?	?		
Program suspended
1943–44	OHAI	?	?	?	?	?	?	?	?	?	?	?		
1944–45	OHAI	1	0	1	0	0	?	?	?	?	?	?		
Program suspended
1950–51	Independent	?	?	?	?	?	?	?	?	?	?	?		
1951–52	Independent	?	?	?	?	?	?	?	?	?	?	?		
1952–53	Independent	?	?	?	?	?	?	?	?	?	?	?		
1953–54	Independent	?	?	?	?	?	?	?	?	?	?	?		
Fred Mason (1954–1955)
1954–55	Independent	?	?	?	?	?	?	?	?	?	?	?		
A. Singleton (1955–1964)
1955–56	Independent	?	?	?	?	?	?	?	?	?	?	?		
1956–57	Independent	?	?	?	?	?	?	?	?	?	?	?		
1957–58	Independent	?	?	?	?	?	?	?	?	?	?	?		
1958–59	Independent	?	?	?	?	?	?	?	?	?	?	?		
1959–60	Independent	?	?	?	?	?	?	?	?	?	?	?		
1960–61	Independent	?	?	?	?	?	?	?	?	?	?	?		
Totals								GP	W	L	T	%	Championships	
Regular Season								?	?	?	?	?	1 West Division title	
Conference Post-season								?	?	?	?	?		
Regular Season and Postseason Record								?	?	?	?	?		

=== Senior collegiate play ===
Note: GP = Games played, W = Wins, L = Losses, T = Ties, OTL = Overtime Losses, SOL = Shootout Losses, Pts = Points

U Sports Champion	U Sports Semifinalist	Conference regular season champions	Conference Division Champions	Conference Playoff Champions

Season	Conference	Regular Season													Conference Tournament Results	National Tournament Results
Season	Conference	Conference								Overall					Conference Tournament Results	National Tournament Results
Season	Conference	GP	W	L	T	OTL	SOL	Pts*	Finish	GP	W	L	T	%	Conference Tournament Results	National Tournament Results
A. Singleton (1955–1964)
1961–62	QOAA	12	3	6	3	–	–	9	6th	12	3	6	3	.375		
1962–63	QOAA	12	5	7	0	–	–	10	5th	12	5	7	0	.417		
Program suspended
College amalgamated into the 'University of Guelph'
unknown (1964–1970)
1964–65	QOAA	16	1	13	2	–	–	4	9th	16	1	13	2	.125		
1965–66	QOAA	16	2	13	1	–	–	5	9th	16	2	13	1	.156		
1966–67	QOAA	16	2	13	1	–	–	5	9th	16	2	13	1	.156		
1967–68	QOAA	16	3	12	1	–	–	7	7th	16	3	12	1	.219		
1968–69	QOAA	15	1	13	1	–	–	3	9th	15	1	13	1	.100		
1969–70	QOAA	15	5	7	3	–	–	13	T–8th	15	5	7	3	.433		
Dennis Mooney (1970–1972)
1970–71	QOAA	15	5	8	2	–	–	12	T–7th	15	5	8	2	.400		
1971–72	OUAA	19	11	7	1	–	–	23	5th	21	12	8	1	.595	Won Quarterfinal, 2–1 (McMaster); Lost Semifinal, 2–6 (York)	
Frank Carney (1972–1973) / Bud Folusewych (1972–1988)
1972–73	OUAA	17	9	6	2	–	–	20	7th	18	9	7	2	.556	Lost Quarterfinal, 0–7 (Waterloo)	
1973–74	OUAA	18	10	6	2	–	–	22	5th	19	10	7	2	.579	Lost Quarterfinal, 1–7 (Western Ontario)	
1974–75	OUAA	17	7	8	2	–	–	16	10th	17	7	8	2	.471		
1975–76	OUAA	20	14	6	0	–	–	28	T–5th	26	18	8	0	.692	Won Quarterfinal, 6–5 (McMaster); Won Semifinal, 6–5 (Toronto); Won Championship, 5–4 (York)	Lost First Round, 2–5 (Concordia); Won Semifinal, 4–1 (Calgary); Lost Championship, 2–7 (Toronto)
1976–77	OUAA	20	9	7	4	–	–	22	5th	22	10	8	4	.545	Won Quarterfinal, 10–5 (Waterloo); Lost Semifinal, 4–5 (York)	
1977–78	OUAA	20	3	15	2	–	–	8	13th	20	3	15	2	.200		
1978–79	OUAA	16	10	3	3	–	–	23	3rd	22	14	4	4	.727	Won Quarterfinal, ? (Windsor); Won Semifinal, ? (Western Ontario); Won Championship series, ? (McMaster)	Lost Group 2 Round-Robin, 5–5 (Dalhousie), 2–7 (Quebec–Chicoutimi)
1979–80	OUAA	22	13	6	3	–	–	29	T–4th	30	18	9	3	.650	Won Quarterfinal, ? (Laurentian); Won Semifinal series, 2–1 (Toronto); Won Championship series, ? (?)	Lost Group 2 Round-Robin, 2–5 (Regina), 5–6 (Moncton)
1980–81	OUAA	22	13	6	3	–	–	29	4th	23	13	7	3	.630	Lost Quarterfinal, 4–5 (York)	
1981–82	OUAA	22	14	6	2	–	–	20	2nd	27	17	8	2	.667	Won Semifinal series, 2–0 (McMaster); Lost Championship series, 1–2 (Toronto)	
1982–83	OUAA	24	11	11	2	–	–	24	7th	24	11	11	2	.500		
1983–84	OUAA	24	14	10	0	–	–	28	T–4th	27	15	12	0	.556	Won Quarterfinal, 10–1 (Laurentian); Lost Semifinal series, 0–2 (Toronto)	
1984–85	OUAA	24	13	8	3	–	–	29	6th	25	13	9	3	.580	Lost Quarterfinal, 5–8 (Western Ontario)	
1985–86	OUAA	24	9	13	2	–	–	20	8th	24	9	13	2	.417		
1986–87	OUAA	24	8	14	2	–	–	.375	8th	24	8	14	2	.375		
1987–88	OUAA	26	6	18	2	–	–	14	14th	26	6	18	2	.269		
Marlin Muylaert (1988–1998)
1988–89	OUAA	26	7	15	4	–	–	18	13th	26	7	15	4	.346		
1989–90	OUAA	22	10	12	0	–	–	20	T–9th	24	10	14	0	.417	Lost Quarterfinal series, 0–2 (Wilfrid Laurier)	
1990–91	OUAA	22	11	10	1	–	–	23	10th	26	13	12	1	.519	Won First Round, 3–2 (Western Ontario); Lost Quarterfinal series, 1–2 (Waterloo)	
1991–92	OUAA	22	15	7	0	–	–	30	T–5th	28	18	10	0	.643	Won Quarterfinal series, 2–1 (Waterloo); Lost Semifinal series, 1–2 (Wilfrid Laurier)	
1992–93	OUAA	22	16	5	1	–	–	33	T–2nd	29	20	8	1	.707	Won Quarterfinal series, 2–0 (Windsor); Won Semifinal series, 2–1 (Waterloo); Lost Championship, 4–5 (Toronto)	Lost Semifinal, 2–3 (Toronto)
1993–94	OUAA	26	15	10	1	–	–	31	6th	32	20	11	1	.641	Won Division Final series, 2–0 (Toronto); Won Semifinal, 3–2 (Quebec–Trois-Rivières); Won Championship, 2–1 (Western Ontario)	Won Semifinal, 6–5 (Western Ontario); Lost Championship, 2–5 (Lethbridge)
1994–95	OUAA	26	16	7	3	–	–	35	T–3rd	32	20	9	3	.672	Won Division Final series, 2–0 (Toronto); Won Semifinal, 3–1 (Quebec–Trois-Rivières); Lost Championship, 4–5 (Western Ontario)	Won Semifinal, 4–1 (Calgary); Lost Championship, 1–5 (Moncton)
1995–96	OUAA	26	16	10	0	–	–	32	T–5th	30	18	12	0	.600	Won Division Final series, 2–1 (Toronto); Lost Semifinal, 2–4 (Quebec–Trois-Rivières)	
1996–97	OUAA	26	21	4	1	–	–	43	2nd	32	27	4	1	.859	Won Division Final series, 2–0 (Toronto); Won Semifinal, 3–1 (Quebec–Trois-Rivières); Won Championship, 3–0 (York)	Won Semifinal, 4–2 (York); Won Championship, 4–2 (New Brunswick)
1997–98	OUA	26	17	5	4	–	–	38	3rd	30	20	6	4	.733	Won Division Final series, 3–0 (Toronto); Lost Semifinal, ? (Quebec–Trois-Rivières)	
Jeff Reid (1998–2007)
1998–99	OUA	26	11	10	5	–	–	27	9th	30	13	12	5	.517	Won Division Final series, 2–1 (Toronto); Lost Semifinal, 1–3 (Quebec–Trois-Rivières)	
1999–00	OUA	26	10	12	4	–	–	24	9th	28	10	14	4	.429	Lost Division Final series, 0–2 (Queen's)	
2000–01	OUA	24	11	11	2	–	–	24	T–7th	28	13	13	2	.500	Won Division Semifinal series, 2–0 (Brock); Lost Division Final series, 0–2 (York)	
2001–02	OUA	24	11	12	1	–	–	13	T–8th	29	12	16	1	.431	Lost Division Semifinal series, 1–2 (Brock)	Lost Pool 1 Round-Robin, 0–8 (Alberta), 2–5 (Western Ontario)
2002–03	OUA	24	6	17	1	–	–	13	T–13th	24	6	17	1	.271		
2003–04	OUA	24	8	12	2	2	–	20	T–11th	24	8	14	2	.375		
2004–05	OUA	24	8	11	4	1	–	21	T–12th	26	8	14	4	.385	Lost Division Semifinal series, 0–2 (Lakehead)	
2005–06	OUA	24	7	14	3	0	–	17	13th	24	7	14	3	.354		
2006–07	OUA	28	7	14	3	4	–	21	T–12th	28	7	18	3	.304		
Shawn Camp (2007–2023)
2007–08	OUA	28	12	13	–	1	2	27	T–13th	28	12	14	2	.464		
2008–09	OUA	28	14	12	–	1	1	30	T–10th	31	15	15	1	.500	Lost Division Quarterfinal series, 1–2 (Western Ontario)	
2009–10	OUA	28	14	10	–	0	4	32	9th	33	16	13	4	.545	Won Division Quarterfinal series, 2–1 (Wilfrid Laurier); Lost Division Semifinal series, 0–2 (Lakehead)	
2010–11	OUA	28	15	10	–	1	2	33	8th	36	19	15	2	.556	Won Division Quarterfinal series, 2–1 (Brock); Won Division Semifinal series, 2–1 (Wilfrid Laurier); Lost Division Final series, 0–2 (Western Ontario)	
2011–12	OUA	28	9	14	–	3	2	23	16th	31	10	19	2	.355	Lost Division Quarterfinal series, 1–2 (Lakehead)	
2012–13	OUA	28	17	9	–	0	2	36	T–6th	33	19	12	2	.606	Won Division Quarterfinal series, 2–1 (Wilfrid Laurier); Lost Division Semifinal series, 0–2 (Windsor)	
2013–14	OUA	28	12	12	–	2	2	28	T–12th	31	13	16	2	.452	Lost Division Quarterfinal series, 1–2 (Western Ontario)	
2014–15	OUA	27	11	13	–	3	0	25	12th	36	27	9	0	.750	Won Division Quarterfinal series, 2–1 (Waterloo); Won Division Semifinal series, 2–1 (Toronto); Won Division Final series, 2–0 (Windsor); Won Championship, 4–0 (Quebec–Trois-Rivières)	Won Quarterfinal, 3–1 (Calgary); Lost Semifinal, 2–5 (New Brunswick); Won Bronze Medal Game, 3–2 (OT) (Quebec–Trois-Rivières)
2015–16	OUA	28	16	11	–	1	0	33	T–8th	36	20	16	0	.556	Won Division Quarterfinal series, 2–1 (Windsor); Won Division Semifinal series, 2–1 (Ryerson); Lost Division Final series, 1–2 (Western Ontario); Lost Bronze Medal Game, 1–4 (Carleton)	
2016–17	OUA	28	15	12	–	1	0	31	11th	32	17	15	0	.531	Won Division Quarterfinal series, 2–0 (Brock); Lost Division Semifinal series, 0–2 (York)	
2017–18	OUA	28	21	6	–	1	0	43	2nd	33	23	10	0	.697	Won Division Quarterfinal series, 2–1 (Windsor); Lost Division Semifinal series, 0–2 (Brock)	
2018–19	OUA	28	13	11	–	0	4	30	11th	38	19	15	4	.553	Won Division Quarterfinal series, 2–0 (Windsor); Won Division Semifinal series, 2–1 (Brock); Won Division Final series, 2–1 (Western Ontario); Lost Championship, 1–4 (Queen's)	Lost Quarterfinal, 1–6 (Saskatchewan)
2019–20	OUA	28	17	6	–	4	1	39	5th	38	24	13	1	.645	Won Division Quarterfinal series, 2–1 (Wilfrid Laurier); Won Division Semifinal series, 2–0 (Brock); Won Division Final series, 2–1 (Western Ontario); Won Championship, 2–1 (3OT) (Ottawa)	Lost Quarterfinal, 1–5 (Saint Mary's)
2020–21	Season cancelled due to COVID-19 pandemic															
2021–22	OUA	16	4	9	–	1	2	.344	18th	16	4	10	2	.313		
2022–23	OUA	27	10	10	–	7	0	27	T–13th	27	10	17	0	.370		
Josh Dixon (2023–Present)
2023–24	OUA	28	11	16	–	1	0	23	15th	28	11	17	0	.393		
Totals										GP	W	L	T/SOL	%	Championships	
Regular Season										1396	635	650	111	.495	3 West Division Titles, 8 Mid West Division Titles	
Conference Post-season										148	94	54	0	.635	5 OUAA Championships, 2 OUA Championships	
U Sports Postseason										21	7	13	1	.357	11 National Tournament appearances	
Regular Season and Postseason Record										1565	736	717	112	.506	1 National Championship	

Note: Totals include senior collegiate play only.
Note: Two additional losses from missing series results in 1979 and 1980 are possible.

=== Notable alumni ===
- Ken Lockett
- Brad Pirie
- Dean Prentice (assistant coach)
