= Ottawa Gee-Gees men's ice hockey =

- University: University of Ottawa
- Conference: OUA; OUA East Division
- Head coach: Patrick Grandmaître; Since 2016–17 season
- Assistant coaches: Justin Stevens; Alexandre Ferraton; Ryan Hand
- Arena: Minto Sports Complex; Ottawa, Ontario
- Colors: Garnet and Gray

U Sports tournament champions
- 2025

U Sports tournament appearances
- 1985, 2004, 2020, 2025

Conference tournament champions
- 1961, 1962, 1963, 1964, 1965, 1993, 2019

The Ottawa Gee-Gees men's ice hockey team is an ice hockey team representing the Ottawa Gee-Gees athletics program of the University of Ottawa. The team is a member of the Ontario University Athletics conference and compete in U Sports. The Gee-Gees play their home games at the Minto Sports Complex in Ottawa, Ontario.

== History ==
The first hockey game with students representing the University, then called Ottawa College, against an external opponent was in February of 1890, with the students taking on the 2nd Ottawas on February 13 at the Rideau Rink. The 1889-90 team played a total of eight games, recording three wins, three losses, and two draws. In 1890-91 the team entered a City league which they continued to play in throughout the 1890's.

Exactly when the school first supported an intercollegiate ice hockey team on a regular basis is unclear. Students from Ottawa had been organizing teams since the beginning of the 20th century, however, it's not until 1910 that records indicate a varsity team. Even then, records are spotty, with Ottawa fading in and out of the historical record prior to World War I. What is known is that Ottawa was ranked as the top Canadian college team in 1914 and met Hobey Baker-led Princeton for the first international intercollegiate championship. Ottawa captured the title in overtime 3–2.

References to Ottawa's hockey team don't reappear until the late 20s when they joined the local city junior league. The Gee-Gees remained members of that organization until the mid-50s. During that stretch, Ottawa also played in the city's senor league for about a decade, but its unclear if they did so with the same team or a separate squad.

Ottawa didn't officially return to varsity collegiate play until 1961 when they joined the Ottawa-St. Lawrence Conference (sometimes called Ottawa-St. Lawrence Athletic Association). After seven years in the league, Ottawa joined the Quebec-Ontario Athletic Association and then remained with the Ontario contingent when the three regional conferences were rearranged along provincial lines. In 1979, Ottawa moved to the Quebec Universities Athletic Association, as they were closer geographically to the Quebec colleges than they were several of the Ontario schools. While the change provided Ottawa with the opportunity tot win their first championship in 1985 as well as their first appearance in the national tournament, the league collapsed in 1987 after several schools suspended operation. The remainder of the league was absorbed by the Ontario University Athletic Association, where Ottawa has remained since.

=== Scandal ===
In February 2014, the Gee-Gees were in Thunder Bay to take on Lakehead. A woman (referred to as M. S.) met Taylor Collins, one of the Ottawa players, at a bar for a romantic encounter. According to her subsequent statement to the police, after the two met at a bar, Taylor disappeared and she was accosted by two of his teammates, David Foucher and Guillaume Donovan. M. S. alleged that she was sexually assaulted by the two players and the charge brought about a swift reaction. The University of Ottawa suspended its men's team in March and head coach Réal Paiement was fired. Foucher and Donovan were formally charged with sexual assault in August and the university twice extended the program's suspension, cancelling the next two seasons in their entirety. The team returned for the 2016–17 season.

The assault trial began more than four years after the reported incident and lasted for approximately two weeks. Justice Chantal M. Brochu heard testimony from seven people including the alleged victim, M. S., as well as Foucher, Donovan and Paiement. During the trial, M. S. was reported to have lied on the witness stand which contributed to Justice Brochu setting her testimony aside. Ultimately, Foucher and Donovan were acquitted of the charges on June 25 and the Crown decided not to appeal the decision.

The 22 players who were not charged with sexual assault filed a class-action lawsuit against both the university and its president, Allan Rock, for defamation in January 2015. The initial filling claimed that the plaintiffs were more concerned with the image and reputation of the university than the damage that would be caused by cancelling a season and alleging implicitly that the players who were not charged had been involved in criminal activity. While the initial demand was for $6 million, the two sides eventually settled for $350,000 in compensation.

=== Aftermath ===
The school decided to restart the team in 2016 and hired Patrick Grandmaître to rebuild the program. Ottawa would remain dogged by the scandal for several years with opposing players and fans chanting slogans like "No means no" even when they weren't on the ice. The team was able to play through the difficult times and swiftly returned to prominence. Ottawa managed to earn an appearance in the 2020 national tournament for just the third time in program history, however, their first match was cancelled due to the COVID-19 pandemic.

== Season-by-season results ==
=== Senior and collegiate play ===
Note: GP = Games played, W = Wins, L = Losses, T = Ties, Pts = Points

Extra-League Champion	U Sports Semifinalist	Conference regular season champions	Conference Division Champions	Conference Playoff Champions

Season	Conference	Regular Season											Conference Tournament Results	National Tournament Results
Season	Conference	Conference						Overall					Conference Tournament Results	National Tournament Results
Season	Conference	GP	W	L	T	Pts*	Finish	GP	W	L	T	%	Conference Tournament Results	National Tournament Results
Senior and Collegiate Hockey
1910–11	CIAU	2	0	2	0	0	?	?	?	?	?	?		
1911–12	CIAU	2	1	1	0	2	T–2nd	?	?	?	?	?	Lost Championship series, 5–25 (McGill)	
1912–13	Independent	?	?	?	?	?	?	?	?	?	?	?		
1913–14	Independent	?	?	?	?	?	?	?	?	?	?	?		
1914–15	Independent	?	?	?	?	?	?	?	?	?	?	?		
Program suspended
1928–29	OCJL	8	5	3	0	10	3rd	?	?	?	?	?		
Program suspended
1934–35	OCJL	12	6	6	0	12	3rd	?	?	?	?	?	Lost Semifinal series, 5–16 (Ottawa Rideaus)	
1935–36	OCJL	11	11	0	0	22	1st	?	?	?	?	?	Won Semifinal series, 6–4 (Ottawa Rideaus); Won Championship series, 2–0 (Ottawa Primrose)	Won Ottawa City Championship series, 16–1 (Ottawa Lindenlea); Lost Ontario Regional Final series, 6–7 (Pembroke Lumber Kings)
1936–37	OCJL	15	12	2	1	25	1st	?	?	?	?	?	Lost Semifinal series, 6–7 (Ottawa Senators)	
1937–38	OCJL	15	8	5	2	18	3rd	?	?	?	?	?	Won Semifinal series, 3–1 (Hull Volants); Lost Championship series 0–2 (Ottawa Primrose)	
1937–38	OSIL	10	2	6	2	6	6th	?	?	?	?	?		
1938–39	OSIL	8	1	6	1	3	5th	?	?	?	?	?		
1939–40	OSIL	10	5	4	1	11	T–3rd	?	?	?	?	?	Lost Semifinal series, 0–6 (Ottawa Technical High School)	
1940–41	OCJL	12	6	4	2	14	T–2nd	?	?	?	?	?	Lost Semifinal series, 7–12 (Ottawa Canadiens)	
1940–41	OSIL	11	1	9	1	3	6th	?	?	?	?	?		
1941–42	OCJL	6	3	3	0	6	2nd	?	?	?	?	?	Won Semifinal series, 13–11 (Hull Volants); Won Championship series, 2–1 (Ottawa Senators)	Lost Regional Semifinal series, 0–2 (Ottawa St. Patricks)
1942–43	OCJL	5	3	2	0	6	3rd	?	?	?	?	?	Lost Championship series, 1–2 (Ottawa New Edinburghs)	
1942–43	OSIL	5	0	5	0	0	6th	?	?	?	?	?		
1943–44	OSIL	11	11	0	0	22	1st	?	?	?	?	?	Won Championship series, 2–0 (Ottawa St. Patricks)	Won Regional Final series, 2–0 (Inkerman Rockets); Lost Memorial Cup Eastern semifinal, 0–2 (Oshawa Generals)
1944–45	OSIL	12	8	2	2	18	2nd	?	?	?	?	?	Won Semifinal series, 2–0 (Ottawa Technical High School); Lost Championship series, 1–2 (Ottawa St. Patricks)	
1945–46	OSIL	6	5	1	0	10	T–1st	?	?	?	?	?	Lost Semifinal series, 9–15 (Ottawa Technical High School)	
1946–47	OSIL	12	10	2	0	20	1st	?	?	?	?	?	Lost Semifinal series, 1–2–1 (Ottawa St. Patricks)	
1947–48	OSIL	17	15	1	1	31	1st	?	?	?	?	?	Won Semifinal series, 2–0 (Ottawa Commerce); Won Championship series, 3–0 (Ottawa Technical High School)	Lost District Final series, 0–2 (Ottawa Senators)
1948–49	OCJL	18	13	3	2	28	2nd	?	?	?	?	?	Won Quarterfinal series, 3–2 (Ottawa Montagnards); Lost Semifinal series, 0–3 (Ottawa St. Patricks)	
1949–50	OCJL	18	3	12	3	9	7th	?	?	?	?	?		
1950–51	OCJL	18	6	12	0	12	5th	?	?	?	?	?	Won Quarterfinal series, 3–2 (Ottawa St. Patricks); Lost Semifinal series, 0–3 (Ottawa Montagnards)	
1951–52	OCJL	15	7	8	0	14	4th	?	?	?	?	?	Lost Quarterfinal series, 1–3 (Ottawa St. Patricks)	
1952–53	OCJL	20	4	11	5	13	4th	?	?	?	?	?	Lost Quarterfinal series, 1–3 (Ottawa St. Patricks)	
1953–54	OCJL	20	0	19	1	1	6th	?	?	?	?	?		
1954–55	OCJL	20	12	6	2	26	1st	?	?	?	?	?	Lost Quarterfinal series, 0–3 (Ottawa St. Jeans)	
1955–56	OCJL	12	2	10	0	4	4th	?	?	?	?	?	Lost Quarterfinal series, 0–3 (Ottawa Shamrocks)	
1956–57	OCJL	15	2	11	2	6	3rd	?	?	?	?	?	Lost Quarterfinal series, 0–3 (Ottawa Shamrocks)	
Totals								GP	W	L	T	%	Championships	
Regular Season								?	?	?	?	?	2 OCJL Championships, 4 OSIL Championships	
Conference Post-season								?	?	?	?	?	2 OCJL Championships, 2 OSIL Championships	
Regular Season and Postseason Record								?	?	?	?	?	1 Quebec Senior League Championship, 2 Quebec Senior Championships	

Note: the OCJL is the Ottawa City Junior League and the OSIL is the Ottawa Senior Interscholastic League.

=== Collegiate only ===
Note: GP = Games played, W = Wins, L = Losses, T = Ties, OTL = Overtime Losses, SOL = Shootout Losses, Pts = Points

U Sports Champion	U Sports Semifinalist	Conference regular season champions	Conference Division Champions	Conference Playoff Champions

Season	Conference	Regular Season													Conference Tournament Results	National Tournament Results
Season	Conference	Conference								Overall					Conference Tournament Results	National Tournament Results
Season	Conference	GP	W	L	T	OTL	SOL	Pts*	Finish	GP	W	L	T	%	Conference Tournament Results	National Tournament Results
1960–61	OSLC	?	?	?	?	–	–	?	1st	?	?	?	?	?		
1961–62	OSLC	10	9	1	0	–	–	18	1st	11	9	2	0	.818	Lost Championship, 2–4 (Sir George Williams)	
1962–63	OSLC	14	12	2	0	–	–	24	1st	16	13	3	0	.813	Won Semifinal, 5–3 (Sir George Williams); Lost Championship, 5–6 (Sherbrooke)	
1963–64	OSLC	14	10	4	0	–	–	20	T–1st	15	10	5	0	.667	Lost Semifinal, 3–4 (Sir George Williams)	
1964–65	OSLC	14	12	1	1	–	–	25	1st	16	13	2	1	.844	Lost Semifinal, 6–7 (Loyola); Won Consolation Game, 7–3 (Carleton)	
1965–66	OSLC	16	11	4	1	–	–	23	3rd	17	11	5	1	.676	Lost Semifinal, 6–7 (Loyola)	
1966–67	QOAA	18	3	14	1	–	–	7	10th	18	3	14	1	.194		
1967–68	QOAA	16	4	11	1	–	–	9	T–7th	16	4	11	1	.281		
1968–69	QOAA	15	1	14	0	–	–	2	12th	15	1	14	0	.067		
1969–70	QOAA	15	10	4	1	–	–	21	3rd	16	10	5	1	.656	Lost Semifinal, 3–7 (Waterloo)	
1970–71	QOAA	15	2	13	0	–	–	4	12th	15	2	13	0	.133		
1971–72	OUAA	18	11	7	0	–	–	22	T–4th	18	11	7	0	.611	Lost Quarterfinal, 1–10 (Toronto)	
1972–73	OUAA	17	7	7	3	–	–	17	9th	17	7	7	3	.500		
1973–74	OUAA	19	8	9	2	–	–	18	9th	19	8	9	2	.474		
1974–75	OUAA	14	8	5	1	–	–	17	8th	15	8	6	1	.567	Lost Quarterfinal, 2–9 (York)	
1975–76	OUAA	16	1	12	3	–	–	5	14th	16	1	12	3	.156		
1976–77	OUAA	18	8	10	0	–	–	16	10th	18	8	10	0	.444		
1977–78	OUAA	20	3	16	1	–	–	7	14th	20	3	16	1	.175		
1978–79	OUAA	16	5	9	2	–	–	12	10th	16	5	9	2	.375		
1979–80	QUAA	22	14	7	1	–	–	29	3rd	24	14	9	1	.604	Lost Semifinal series, 0–2 (Concordia)	
1980–81	QUAA	24	15	7	2	–	–	32	2nd	29	17	10	2	.621	Won Semifinal series, 2–1 (Laval); Lost Championship series, 0–2 (Concordia)	
1981–82	QUAA	24	13	9	2	–	–	28	3rd	26	13	11	2	.538	Lost Semifinal series, 0–2 (Quebec–Trois-Rivières)	
1982–83	QUAA	30	10	18	2	–	–	22	T–5th	30	10	18	2	.367		
1983–84	QUAA	24	9	10	5	–	–	23	T–2nd	31	12	14	5	.468	Won Semifinal series, 3–1 (McGill); Lost Championship series, 0–3 (Concordia)	
1984–85	QUAA	20	10	8	2	–	–	22	2nd	31	17	12	2	.581	Won Semifinal series, 2–1 (Quebec–Trois-Rivières); Won Championship series, 3–1 (Quebec–Chicoutimi)	Won Eastern Quarterfinal series, 2–0 (Prince Edward Island); Lost Semifinal series, 8–11 (York)
1985–86	QUAA	20	11	9	0	–	–	22	2nd	27	14	13	0	.519	Won Semifinal series, 2–1 (McGill); Lost Championship series, 1–3 (Quebec–Trois-Rivières)	
1986–87	QUAA	18	13	4	1	–	–	.750	2nd	21	14	6	1	.690	Lost Semifinal series, 1–2 (McGill)	
1987–88	OUAA	25	12	12	1	–	–	25	10th	27	12	14	1	.463	Lost Division Semifinal series, 0–2 (Quebec–Trois-Rivières)	
1988–89	OUAA	26	8	18	0	–	–	16	14th	26	8	18	0	.308		
1989–90	OUAA	22	13	8	1	–	–	27	T–4th	25	14	10	1	.580	Lost Quarterfinal series, 1–2 (York)	
1990–91	OUAA	22	8	12	2	–	–	18	12th	23	8	13	2	.391	Lost First Round, 3–4 (Toronto)	
1991–92	OUAA	22	10	10	2	–	–	22	9th	22	10	10	2	.500		
1992–93	OUAA	22	17	5	0	–	–	34	1st	26	19	7	0	.731	Won Quarterfinal series, 2–0 (McGill); Lost Semifinal series, 0–2 (Toronto)	
1993–94	OUAA	24	16	5	3	–	–	35	3rd	26	16	7	3	.673	Won Division Semifinal, 0–2 (Quebec–Trois-Rivières)	
1994–95	OUAA	24	12	10	2	–	–	26	T–8th	24	12	10	2	.542		
1995–96	OUAA	26	14	10	2	–	–	30	T–7th	30	16	12	2	.567	Won Division Semifinal, 5–3 (McGill); Lost Division Final series, 1–2 (Quebec–Trois-Rivières)	
1996–97	OUAA	26	13	12	1	–	–	27	10th	27	13	13	1	.500	Lost Division Semifinal, 2–7 (McGill)	
1997–98	OUA	26	13	12	1	–	–	27	9th	26	13	12	1	.519		
1998–99	OUA	26	17	9	0	–	–	34	4th	28	17	11	0	.607	Lost Division Semifinal series, 0–2 (Concordia)	
1999–00	OUA	26	8	14	4	–	–	20	T–12th	26	8	14	4	.385		
2000–01	OUA	24	6	16	2	–	–	14	T–12th	24	6	16	2	.292		
2001–02	OUA	24	15	8	1	–	–	31	T–3rd	26	15	10	1	.596	Lost Division Final series, 0–2 (Quebec–Trois-Rivières)	
2002–03	OUA	24	13	9	2	–	–	28	7th	28	15	11	2	.571	Won Division Semifinal series, 2–0 (Concordia); Lost Division Final series, 0–2 (Quebec–Trois-Rivières)	
2003–04	OUA	24	17	3	3	1	–	38	T–2nd	31	20	8	3	.694	Won Division Semifinal series, 2–1 (Quebec–Trois-Rivières); Won Division Final, 4–2 (Toronto); Lost Queen's Cup Final, 2–3 (York)	Lost Pool A Round-Robin, 3–7 (Alberta), 2–5 (New Brunswick)
2004–05	OUA	24	13	8	2	1	–	29	T–8th	29	15	12	2	.552	Won Division Quarterfinal series, 2–1 (Concordia); Lost Division Semifinal series, 0–2 (McGill)	
2005–06	OUA	24	13	8	2	1	–	29	T–5th	30	16	12	2	.567	Won Division Quarterfinal series, 2–1 (Concordia); Lost Division Semifinal series, 1–2 (McGill)	
2006–07	OUA	28	11	12	3	2	–	27	10th	33	14	16	3	.470	Won Division Quarterfinal series, 2–0 (Queen's); Lost Division Semifinal series, 1–2 (Quebec–Trois-Rivières)	
2007–08	OUA	28	14	12	–	0	2	30	9th	33	17	14	2	.545	Won Division Quarterfinal series, 2–1 (Toronto); Lost Division Semifinal series, 0–2 (Quebec–Trois-Rivières)	
2008–09	OUA	28	12	11	–	3	2	29	12th	31	13	16	2	.452	Lost Division Quarterfinal series, 1–2 (McGill)	
2009–10	OUA	28	6	20	–	2	0	14	19th	28	6	22	0	.214		
2010–11	OUA	28	11	14	–	1	2	25	16th	30	11	17	2	.400	Lost Division Quarterfinal series, 0–2 (McGill)	
2011–12	OUA	28	14	13	–	0	1	29	11th	32	16	15	1	.516	Won Division Quarterfinal series, 2–0 (Nipissing); Lost Division Semifinal series, 0–2 (McGill)	
2012–13	OUA	28	16	8	–	2	2	36	T–6th	34	19	13	2	.588	Won Division Quarterfinal series, 2–1 (Toronto); Lost Division Semifinal series, 1–2 (Carleton)	
2013–14	OUA	28	17	10	–	0	1	35	7th	30	17	12	1	.583	Lost Division Quarterfinal series, 0–2 (Queen's)	
Program suspended
2016–17	OUA	28	15	8	–	4	1	35	T–6th	30	15	14	1	.517	Lost Division Quarterfinal series, 0–2 (Queen's)	
2017–18	OUA	28	16	8	–	3	1	36	6th	38	29	8	1	.776	Won Division Quarterfinal series, 2–0 (Carleton); Lost Division Semifinal series, 2–1 (McGill)	
2018–19	OUA	28	22	2	–	1	3	46	1st	33	25	5	3	.803	Won Division Quarterfinal series, 2–0 (Laurentian); Lost Division Semifinal series, 1–2 (Queen's)	
2019–20	OUA	28	17	7	–	2	2	38	6th	37	23	12	2	.649	Won Division Quarterfinal series, 2–1 (Ontario Tech); Won Division Semifinal series, 2–1 (Quebec–Trois-Rivières); Won Division Final series, 2–0 (Concordia); Lost Queen's Cup Final, 1–2 (3OT) (Guelph)	Tournament cancelled
2020–21	Season cancelled due to COVID-19 pandemic															
2021–22	OUA	18	9	8	–	1	0	.528	9th	19	9	10	0	.474	Lost Division Quarterfinal, 0–4 (Nipissing)	
2022–23	OUA	26	13	11	–	2	0	28	11th	28	13	15	0	.464	Lost Division Quarterfinal series, 0–2 (McGill)	
2023–24	OUA	28	20	6	–	2	0	42	T–3rd	32	22	10	0	.688	Won Division Quarterfinal series, 2–0 (Ontario Tech); Lost Division Semifinal series, 0–2 (Quebec–Trois-Rivières)	
Totals										GP	W	L	T/SOL	%	Championships	
Regular Season										1336	671	582	83	.533	4 Far East Division Titles, 2 East Division Titles, 5 OSLC Championships, 1 OUAA Championship, 1 OUA Championships	
Conference Post-season										143	67	76	0	.469	1 QUAA Championship	
U Sports Postseason										6	2	4	0	.333	3 National tournament appearances	
Regular Season and Postseason Record										1485	740	662	83	.526		

Note: Totals include results from 1961–62 onward.

== See also ==
Ottawa Gee-Gees women's ice hockey
