= University Cup all-time team records =

This is a list of U Sports University Cup all-time records, updated through the 2026 tournament.

School	Current Conference	Games	Wins	Losses	Ties	Winning pct.	Championships
Acadia	AUS	20	9	11	0	.450	2
Alberta	Canada West	113	76	35	2	.681	16
Brandon	N/A	8	0	8	0	.000	0
British Columbia	Canada West	9	3	6	0	.333	0
Brock	OUA	5	0	5	0	.000	0
Calgary	Canada West	25	7	18	0	.280	0
Carleton	OUA	4	0	4	0	.000	0
Concordia	OUA	28	11	15	2	.429	0
Dalhousie	AUS	9	4	4	1	.500	0
Guelph	OUA	21	7	13	1	.357	1
Lakehead	OUA	11	3	8	0	.273	0
Laurentian	N/A	14	5	9	0	.357	0
Laval	N/A	1	0	1	0	.000	0
Lethbridge	N/A	3	2	1	0	.667	1
Loyola	N/A	10	1	9	0	.100	0
Manitoba	Canada West	14	5	9	0	.357	1
McGill	OUA	21	10	11	0	.476	1
McMaster	N/A	2	2	0	0	1.000	1
Moncton	AUS	35	19	15	1	.557	4
Montreal	N/A	2	0	2	0	.000	0
Mount Royal	Canada West	2	0	2	0	.000	0
New Brunswick	AUS	62	47	15	0	.758	10
Ottawa	OUA	9	5	4	0	.556	1
Prince Edward Island	AUS	9	2	7	0	.222	0
Quebec–Chicoutimi	N/A	2	1	1	0	.500	0
Quebec–Trois-Rivières	OUA	55	31	24	0	.564	6
Queen's	OUA	6	1	5	0	.143	0
Regina	Canada West	9	2	7	0	.222	0
Saint Dunstan's	N/A	2	1	1	0	.500	0
Saint Mary's	AUS	41	21	20	0	.512	1
Saskatchewan	Canada West	55	25	30	0	.436	1
Sherbrooke	N/A	2	0	2	0	.000	0
Sir George Williams	N/A	13	3	10	0	.231	0
St. Francis Xavier	AUS	41	22	19	0	.537	1
St. Thomas	N/A	2	0	2	0	.000	0
Toronto	OUA	46	35	11	0	.761	10
Toronto Metropolitan	OUA	9	3	6	0	.333	0
Waterloo	OUA	7	4	3	0	.571	1
Western Ontario	OUA	25	11	14	0	.440	1
Wilfrid Laurier	OUA	15	5	10	0	.333	0
Windsor	OUA	11	2	9	0	.182	0
York	OUA	21	10	11	0	.476	3

Note: teams in italics no longer compete in U Sports.

== Record by conference ==
As of 2026

Conference	Games	Wins	Losses	Ties	Winning pct.	Championships
AUS	217	124	91	2	.576	18
Canada West	227	118	107	2	.524	19
OUA	294	138	153	3	.474	24
GPAC	28	3	25	0	.107	0
OIAA	17	7	10	0	.412	0
OSLC	17	3	14	0	.176	0
QUAA	49	20	27	2	.429	1

Defunct conferences in italics
Note: AUS totals include results while known as 'MIAA', 'AIAA' and 'AUAA'.
Note: Canada West totals include results while known as 'WCIAU'.
Note: OUA totals include results while known as 'OUAA', 'QOAA' and 'CIAU'.

== See also ==
- University Cup appearances by team
