= OIAA men's ice hockey tournament =

Ontario Intercollegiate Athletic Association men's ice hockey tournament
- Conference hockey championship
- Sport: Ice hockey
- Conference: Ontario Intercollegiate Athletic Association
- Format: Single-elimination
- Played: 1959–1971

The Ontario Intercollegiate Athletic Association ice hockey tournament was an annual conference championship held between member teams.

== History ==
With college hockey expanding in Canada throughout the 1950s, many colleges in Ontario were looking to establish themselves but faced a difficult challenge. The major programs of the day would not have given their newer, smaller counterparts much room with which to grow. An intermediate league, the Ottawa–St. Lawrence Conference, had already been formed but many other programs did not want to take on the expense of travelling several hundred miles for second-tier collegiate games. By 1958, enough programs were operating in southern Ontario to form a new intermediate league. The Ontario Intercollegiate Athletic Association began with five teams around the western edge of Lake Ontario. The league remained unchanged for four years when two teams left for the top tier Quebec–Ontario Athletic Association. In their place, five new programs were added in 1962. After the league's first season as an eight team-conference, the OIAA petitioned to receive a bid to the U Sports men's ice hockey championship. The league's bid was rejected and the conference responded by disbanding mid-way through the following year. In the summer of 1964, the Canadian Intercollegiate Athletic Union reconsidered their position and agreed to invite the OIAA champion to participate.

When the league reformed, the teams were divided into two groups and the winner of each group would play for the league championship. After two teams withdrew that offseason, the group format was abandoned, as was the tournament. The OIAA would award the championship to the team that finished with the best regular season record for four years before restarting the tournament in 1970. In 1971, the four leagues in Ontario and Quebec were realigned along provincial borders and the OIAA ceased to exist.

== Tournaments ==
=== 1959 ===
Seed	School	Standings
1	Ryerson	10–0–0
2	Ontario Agricultural	?
?	McMaster	?
?	Osgoode Hall	?
?	Waterloo	?

Note: Records incomplete.

Championship
1	Ryerson	6
2	Ontario Agricultural	3

=== 1960 ===
Seed	School	Standings
?	Ryerson	5–2–0
?	Osgoode Hall	?
?	McMaster	?
?	Ontario Agricultural	?
?	Waterloo	?

Note: Records incomplete.

Championship
Ryerson	5	3	8
Osgoode Hall	2	7	9

=== 1961 ===
Seed	School	Standings
1	McMaster	?
2	Ryerson	6–2–2
3	Ontario Agricultural	?
?	Osgoode Hall	?
?	Waterloo Lutheran	?

Note: Records incomplete.

Semifinal
1	McMaster	?
4	?	?
2	Ryerson	?
3	Ontario Agricultural	?

Championship
1	McMaster	?
3	Ontario Agricultural	?

=== 1962 ===
Seed	School	Standings
1	McMaster	?
2	Ryerson	6–2–0
?	Ontario Agricultural	?
?	Osgoode Hall	?
?	Waterloo Lutheran	?

Note: Records incomplete.

Championship
1	McMaster	–
2	Ryerson	–

Note: Ryerson forfeited the final due to their exam schedule.

=== 1963 ===
Seed	School	Standings	Seed	School	Standings
1	Ryerson	8–0–0	?	Ontario Agricultural	?
?	Waterloo Lutheran	?	?	Osgoode Hall	?
?	Laurentian	?	?	Western Ontario Tech	?
?	Hamilton Tech	?	?	York	?

Note: Records incomplete.

Semifinal			Championship
			1	Ryerson	7	2	9
?	Laurentian	4	?	Waterloo Lutheran	5	2	7
?	Waterloo Lutheran	7

=== 1964 ===
Seed	School	Standings	Seed	School	Standings
?	Ryerson	3–2–1	?	Ontario Agricultural	?
?	Waterloo Lutheran	?	?	Osgoode Hall	?
?	Laurentian	?	?	Western Ontario Tech	?
?	Hamilton Tech	?	?	York	?

Note: Records incomplete.
Note: All league members withdrew from competition in protest over not being invited to participate in the 1964 CIAU University Cup.
no playoffs

=== 1965 ===
Group A			Group B		
Seed	School	Standings	Seed	School	Standings
1	Laurentian	9–0–0	1	Windsor	6–0–0
2	Waterloo Lutheran	4–3–0	T–2	York	3–3–0
3	Ryerson	3–6–0	T–2	Western Ontario Tech	3–3–0
4	Osgoode Hall	0–7–0	4	Hamilton Tech	0–6–0

Championship
A1	Laurentian	4
B1	Windsor	2

=== 1966 ===
Seed	School	Standings	Seed	School	Standings
1	Laurentian	9–0–1	4	Osgoode Hall	4–6–0
2	Waterloo Lutheran	6–2–2	5	Ryerson	3–6–0
3	York	5–4–1	6	Windsor	1–9–0

no playoffs

=== 1967 ===
Seed	School	Standings	Seed	School	Standings
1	Laurentian	10–0–1	5	Western Ontario Tech	3–8–1
2	Waterloo Lutheran	9–3–0	6	Osgoode Hall	3–9–0
3	Windsor	7–5–0	7	Ryerson	2–8–0
4	York	6–6–0			

no playoffs

=== 1968 ===
Seed	School	Standings	Seed	School	Standings
1	Laurentian	10–2–0	T–4	Ryerson	6–6–0
2	York	8–4–0	6	Osgoode Hall	5–7–0
3	Waterloo Lutheran	7–5–0	7	Brock	0–12–0
T–4	Windsor	6–6–0			

no playoffs

=== 1969 ===
Seed	School	Standings	Seed	School	Standings
1	Laurentian	8–2–0	4	York	5–5–0
2	Waterloo Lutheran	7–3–0	5	Osgoode Hall	3–7–0
3	Ryerson	6–4–0	6	Brock	0–10–0

no playoffs

=== 1970 ===
Seed	School	Standings	Seed	School	Standings
1	York	10–0–0	T–3	Ryerson	5–5–0
2	Laurentian	5–4–1	5	Trent	2–7–1
T–3	Waterloo Lutheran	4–4–2	6	Brock	2–8–0

Semifinal			Championship
			1	York	8
2	Laurentian	8	2	Laurentian	2
3	Waterloo Lutheran	2

=== 1971 ===
Seed	School	Standings	Seed	School	Standings
1	Laurentian	10–0–0	T–4	Ryerson	2–7–1
2	York	8–2–0	T–4	Brock	2–7–1
3	Waterloo Lutheran	6–4–0	6	Trent	1–9–0

Semifinal			Championship
			1	Laurentian	5
2	York	8	2	York	3
3	Waterloo Lutheran	1

== Championships ==
School	Championships
Laurentian	6
McMaster	2
Ryerson	2
Osgoode Hall	1
York	1

== See also ==
- OSLC men's ice hockey tournament
- OUAA men's ice hockey tournament
- QUAA men's ice hockey tournament
- OUA men's ice hockey tournament
