= OUAA men's ice hockey tournament =

Ontario University Athletic Association men's ice hockey tournament
- Conference hockey championship
- Sport: Ice hockey
- Conference: Ontario University Athletic Association
- Format: Single-elimination
- Played: 1972–1997
- Winner trophy: Queen's Cup

The Ontario University Athletic Association ice hockey tournament was an annual conference championship held between member teams.

== History ==
After the realignment of the Quebec–Ontario Athletic Association, Ontario Intercollegiate Athletic Association and Ottawa-St. Lawrence Conference in 1971, the Ontario University Athletic Association was born. The league began with 14 teams arranged into four divisions. The inaugural postseason tournament invited eight teams with the top four from each division automatically qualifying for the playoffs. The quarterfinal matches were all played within the same division while the semifinals were played cross-division.

=== Three division league ===
Beginning in 1976, the OUAA was divided into three divisions: East, Central and West. The inaugural tournament under this new arrangement was a convoluted affair. The top two teams from each division would make the tournament while the third place team with the best record would also be allowed entry. The team with the best record would receive a bye into the semifinal round, however, there was a slight issue. Because the teams played an unbalanced schedule with the central playing three games against division foes, the east four games and west five, the divisional records were not interchangeable. However, despite this, the OUAA still used the point system to determine the league champion rather than winning percentage. This resulted in Western Ontario receiving a bye while Toronto had the best overall record. The seeding was set up so that the two other division winners were placed in the same semifinal bracket. The two second-place teams with the worst record were set against one another and placed in the bracket with the team that received the bye. Of the remaining two teams, the one with the worst record was set against the second-best division winner. This convoluted process was abandoned after one season and replaced with another that was just as unfathomable. In 1977 the bye was eliminated and instead the best two third place teams would make the tournament. The third place teams were set against the second place teams from their own divisions in the quarterfinal round while the top two division winners were placed on opposite sides of the bracket. In order to reduce travel, the division that did not advance a third place team was separated so that they would play the nearest of the other division winners. This resulted in York and Ryerson (both located in Toronto) being set against one another in the quarterfinal round despite both being division champions. This rather unique arrangement persisted for three seasons before the loss of three conference members caused the league to revert to a single division with six teams making the postseason.

Over the course of a decade, the OUAA began to shift from single-elimination rounds to best-of-three. 1978 saw the final round become a 3-game series with the semifinal following in 1980. It wasn't until the tournament was expanded back to an eight-team bracket in 1987 that the quarterfinal round became best-of-three as well. The following season, The QUAA collapsed and all four teams were absorbed into the OUAA. The league reverted to three divisions and expanded the playoffs to include twelve teams. The format was arranged so that the top four teams in each division would play in their respective division brackets. The winners would advance to the league semifinal along with the losing team with the best record. The first two rounds were best-of-three series while the final two were single-elimination. This setup lasted two years and was altered when McMaster suspended its program. Beginning in 1990, the OUAA switched to two divisions and alternated its postseason between 12- and 8-team formats. The additional first round series were single-elimination while the succeeding round remained best-of-three. Starting in 1992, the championship game was switched to single-elimination.

=== Four division league ===
In 1994, the two 8-team divisions were split and the league was now arranged into four 4-team divisions. The top three teams from each division made the postseason with the division champions advancing to the quarterfinal round. First and second round matches were all played within the divisions and the final four was arranged so that both the eastern and western halves would be represented in the championship game. In this format, only the quarterfinal round was best-of-three with all other round being single-elimination. The OUAA changes its name to Ontario University Athletics (OUA) in 1998.

== Tournaments ==
=== 1972 ===
East			West		
Seed	School	Standings	Seed	School	Standings
1	York	16–1–2	1	Western Ontario	11–5–3
2	Toronto	15–1–3	2	Guelph	11–7–1
T–3	Ottawa	11–7–0	3	McMaster	10–8–1
T–3	Laurentian	10–6–2	4	Windsor	8–8–3
5	Queen's	8–10–1	5	Waterloo	7–10–2
6	Carleton	4–13–2	6	Waterloo Lutheran	5–10–4
7	Ryerson	2–17–0	7	Brock	2–17–0

Quarterfinals; March 6–7
E1	York	6
E4	Laurentian	1
W2	Guelph	2
W3	McMaster	1
W1	Western Ontario	5
W4	Windsor	2
E2	Toronto	10
E3	Ottawa	1

Semifinals; March 10
E1	York	6
W2	Guelph	2
W1	Western Ontario	2
E2	Toronto	5

Championship; March 11
E1	York	2
E2	Toronto	6

Note: * denotes overtime period(s)

=== 1973 ===
East			West		
Seed	School	Standings	Seed	School	Standings
1	Toronto	17–0–0	1	Western Ontario	14–3–0
2	Laurentian	11–5–1	2	Waterloo	10–5–2
T–3	Queen's	10–6–1	3	Guelph	9–6–2
T–3	York	10–6–1	4	Windsor	9–8–0
5	Ottawa	7–7–3	5	McMaster	8–9–0
6	Carleton	3–12–2	6	Waterloo Lutheran	3–14–0
7	Ryerson	0–17–0	7	Brock	2–15–0

Quarterfinals; February 27–28
E1	Toronto	8
E4	York	2
W2	Waterloo	7
W3	Guelph	0
W1	Western Ontario	7
W4	Windsor	1
E2	Laurentian	5*
E3	Queen's	4

Semifinals; March 2
E1	Toronto	13
W2	Waterloo	2
W1	Western Ontario	5
E2	Laurentian	4

Championship; March 3
E1	Toronto	8
W1	Western Ontario	1

Note: * denotes overtime period(s)

=== 1974 ===
East			West		
Seed	School	Standings	Seed	School	Standings
1	Toronto	18–0–1	1	Waterloo	12–2–3
2	York	16–2–1	2	Western Ontario	13–4–0
3	Laurentian	10–6–3	3	Guelph	10–6–2
4	Queen's	10–7–2	4	Wilfrid Laurier	8–9–1
5	Ottawa	8–9–2	5	McMaster	6–11–1
6	Carleton	4–12–2	6	Windsor	2–14–2
T–7	Ryerson	4–14–1	7	Brock	1–16–0
T–7	Royal Military College	3–12–3			

Quarterfinals; February 26
E1	Toronto	8
E4	Queen's	2
W2	Western Ontario	4
W3	Guelph	1
W1	Waterloo	8
W4	Wilfrid Laurier	6
E2	York	8
E3	Laurentian	2

Semifinals; March 1
E1	Toronto	4
W2	Western Ontario	6
W1	Waterloo	8
E2	York	4

Championship; March 2
W2	Western Ontario	4
W1	Waterloo	6

Note: * denotes overtime period(s)

=== 1975 ===
East			West		
Seed	School	Standings	Seed	School	Standings
1	York	9–2–3	1	Waterloo	14–2–1
2	Toronto	9–4–1	2	Western Ontario	11–4–2
3	Laurentian	8–4–2	3	Wilfrid Laurier	11–5–1
4	Ottawa	8–5–1	4	McMaster	9–5–3
5	Queen's	6–6–2	5	Guelph	7–8–2
6	Royal Military College	2–11–1	6	Brock	3–14–0
			7	Ryerson	2–15–0
			8	Windsor	1–15–1

Quarterfinals; February 21
E1	York	9
E4	Ottawa	2
W2	Western Ontario	12
W3	Wilfrid Laurier	3
W1	Waterloo	9
W4	McMaster	6
E2	Toronto	4
E3	Laurentian	3

Semifinals; February 28
E1	York	9
W2	Western Ontario	3
W1	Waterloo	3
E2	Toronto	9

Championship; March 1
E1	York	3
E2	Toronto	4

Note: * denotes overtime period(s)

=== 1976 ===
East			Central			West		
Seed	School	Standings	Seed	School	Standings	Seed	School	Standings
1	Toronto	13–3–0	1	McMaster	9–2–1	T–1	Western Ontario	14–6–0
2	York	10–4–0	2	Ryerson	7–3–2	T–1	Guelph	14–6–0
3	Queen's	9–5–2	3	Royal Military College	6–5–1	3	Waterloo	9–10–1
4	Laurentian	4–10–2	4	Trent	4–8–0	4	Wilfrid Laurier	6–10–4
5	Ottawa	1–12–3	5	Brock	0–11–1	5	Windsor	3–14–3

Quarterfinals; February 20–21
C2	Ryerson	0
E2	York	14
E1	Toronto	2
E3	Queen's	1
C1	McMaster	5
W2	Guelph	6

Semifinals; February 27
W1	Western Ontario	2
E2	York	5
E1	Toronto	5
W2	Guelph	6

Championship; February 28
E2	York	4
W2	Guelph	5

Note: * denotes overtime period(s)

=== 1977 ===
East			Central			West		
Seed	School	Standings	Seed	School	Standings	Seed	School	Standings
1	York	16–2–1	1	Ryerson	11–3–1	1	Wilfrid Laurier	13–6–1
2	Toronto	12–5–1	2	Brock	8–7–0	2	Guelph	9–7–4
3	Laurentian	8–9–3	3	McMaster	7–9–0	T–3	Waterloo	9–9–2
4	Ottawa	8–10–0	4	Trent	4–9–2	T–3	Western Ontario	9–9–2
5	Queen's	4–14–1	5	Royal Military College	1–13–1	5	Windsor	5–12–1

Quarterfinals; February 21–22
E1	York	11
C1	Ryerson	1
W2	Guelph	10
W3	Waterloo	5
W1	Wilfrid Laurier	9
C2	Brock	0
E2	Toronto	4
E3	Laurentian	1

Semifinals; February 25
E1	York	5
W2	Guelph	4
W1	Wilfrid Laurier	1
E2	Toronto	6

Championship; February 26
E1	York	2
E2	Toronto	3

Note: * denotes overtime period(s)

=== 1978 ===
East			Central			West		
Seed	School	Standings	Seed	School	Standings	Seed	School	Standings
1	Toronto	18–1–1	1	McMaster	11–3–2	1	Wilfrid Laurier	17–2–1
2	York	10–8–2	2	Ryerson	9–6–1	2	Western Ontario	14–3–3
3	Laurentian	8–10–0	3	Brock	5–7–3	3	Windsor	6–9–5
4	Queen's	7–9–4	4	Trent	4–10–2	4	Waterloo	7–11–2
5	Ottawa	3–16–1	5	Royal Military College	2–13–0	5	Guelph	3–15–2

Quarterfinals; February 24
E1	Toronto	11
C2	Ryerson	0
Eastern
E2	York	8
E3	Laurentian	1
W1	Wilfrid Laurier	5
C1	McMaster	4
Western
W2	Western Ontario	9
W3	Windsor	4

Semifinals; February 28
E1	Toronto	8
E2	York	6
W1	Wilfrid Laurier	6
W2	Western Ontario	0

Championship; March 4, 11
E1	Toronto	3	4	-
W1	Wilfrid Laurier	2	1	-

Note: * denotes overtime period(s)

=== 1979 ===
East			Central			West		
Seed	School	Standings	Seed	School	Standings	Seed	School	Standings
1	Toronto	11–2–3	1	McMaster	13–2–1	1	Guelph	10–3–3
2	Laurentian	8–3–5	2	Windsor	8–7–1	2	Wilfrid Laurier	9–5–2
3	York	5–7–4	3	Ryerson	3–11–2	3	Western Ontario	7–5–4
4	Ottawa	5–9–2	4	Brock	0–14–2	4	Waterloo	4–7–5
5	Queen's	2–10–4						

Quarterfinals; February 20
E1	Toronto	3
C1	McMaster	4*
Eastern
E2	Laurentian	?
E3	York	?
W1	Guelph	?
C2	Windsor	?
Western
W2	Wilfrid Laurier	?
W3	Western Ontario	?

Semifinals
C1	McMaster	?
?	?	?
W1	Guelph	?
W3	Western Ontario	?

Championship
C1	McMaster	?	?	?
W1	Guelph	?	?	?

Note: Only partial information is available.
Note: * denotes overtime period(s)

=== 1980 ===
Seed	School	Standings	Seed	School	Standings
1	Toronto	17–2–3	7	Western Ontario	11–9–2
2	Queen's	17–3–2	8	York	8–11–3
3	McMaster	15–2–5	9	Wilfrid Laurier	5–14–3
T–4	Laurentian	13–6–3	10	Brock	5–16–1
T–4	Guelph	13–6–3	T–11	Ryerson	1–20–1
6	Waterloo	10–7–5	T–11	Windsor	1–20–1

Quarterfinals; February 20
4	Laurentian	?
5	Guelph	?
3	McMaster	?
6	Waterloo	?

Semifinals
1	Toronto	4	2	0
5	Guelph	3	5	4
2	Queen's	?	?	?
?	?	?	?	?

Championship
5	Guelph	?	?	?
?	?	?	?	?

Note: Only partial information is available.
Note: * denotes overtime period(s)

=== 1981 ===
Seed	School	Standings	Seed	School	Standings
1	Queen's	14–3–5	7	Wilfrid Laurier	12–8–2
2	Western Ontario	14–4–4	8	Windsor	8–13–1
3	Toronto	15–6–1	9	Laurentian	6–15–1
4	Guelph	13–6–3	10	Waterloo	4–17–1
T–5	York	12–7–3	T–11	Ryerson	3–17–2
T–5	McMaster	13–7–2	T–11	Brock	2–16–4

Quarterfinals; February 18, 20
3	Toronto	8
6	McMaster	4
4	Guelph	4
5	York	5

Semifinals; February 20, 22
1	Queen's	8	6	-
5	York	0	2	-
2	Western Ontario	5	4	-
3	Toronto	2	0	-

Championship; March 2, 4
1	Queen's	3	6	-
2	Western Ontario	1	5	-

Note: * denotes overtime period(s)

=== 1982 ===
Seed	School	Standings	Seed	School	Standings
1	Toronto	18–0–4	7	Western Ontario	12–9–1
2	Guelph	14–6–2	8	Laurentian	9–10–3
T–3	Queen's	13–7–2	T–9	Windsor	7–13–2
T–3	McMaster	13–7–2	T–9	Waterloo	7–13–2
T–5	York	13–8–1	11	Brock	2–20–0
T–5	Wilfrid Laurier	12–7–3	12	Ryerson	1–21–0

Quarterfinals
3	Queen's	3
6	Wilfrid Laurier	7
4	McMaster	6
5	York	5

Semifinals
1	Toronto	5	6	-
6	Wilfrid Laurier	2	2	-
2	Guelph	5	2	-
4	McMaster	2	1	-

Championship
1	Toronto	5	4	5
2	Guelph	6	3	4

Note: * denotes overtime period(s)

=== 1983 ===
Seed	School	Standings	Seed	School	Standings
1	Toronto	22–1–1	T–8	Windsor	11–12–1
2	Western Ontario	20–4–0	T–8	Laurentian	11–12–1
3	Wilfrid Laurier	19–4–1	10	Brock	7–15–2
4	Queen's	15–8–1	T–11	Royal Military College	3–21–0
5	McMaster	14–10–0	T–11	Ryerson	3–21–0
6	York	13–11–0	13	Waterloo	2–21–1
7	Guelph	11–11–2			

Quarterfinals; February
3	Wilfrid Laurier	5
6	York	4
4	Queen's	4
5	McMaster	3

Semifinals; February 25–27
1	Toronto	7	4	-
6	Queen's	1	2	-
2	Western Ontario	4	4	4
3	Wilfrid Laurier	2	5	6

Championship; March 3, 5
1	Toronto	4	2	-
3	Wilfrid Laurier	5	4	-

Note: * denotes overtime period(s)

=== 1984 ===
Seed	School	Standings	Seed	School	Standings
1	Toronto	20–1–3	T–8	McMaster	7–13–4
2	Wilfrid Laurier	15–3–6	T–8	Brock	7–13–4
3	Western Ontario	15–8–1	10	Windsor	8–15–1
T–4	Guelph	14–10–0	T–11	York ^{†}	10–13–1
T–4	Laurentian	12–8–4	T–11	Royal Military College	5–14–5
6	Queen's	11–9–4	13	Ryerson	4–20–0
7	Waterloo	10–11–3			

† York was penalized 5 points in the standings for using an ineligible player.

Quarterfinals; February
3	Western Ontario	9
6	Queen's	4
4	Guelph	10
5	Laurentian	1

Semifinals; February 24–26
1	Toronto	7	13	-
4	Guelph	2	4	-
2	Wilfrid Laurier	8	1	2
3	Western Ontario	5	5	3

Championship; February 29, March 2
1	Toronto	2	5	-
3	Western Ontario	1	3	-

Note: * denotes overtime period(s)

=== 1985 ===
Seed	School	Standings	Seed	School	Standings
1	Toronto	19–2–3	8	McMaster	11–12–1
2	Wilfrid Laurier	18–2–4	9	Queen's	7–13–4
3	Western Ontario	15–7–2	T–10	Brock	6–16–2
4	Laurentian	14–7–3	T–10	Royal Military College	5–15–4
5	York	15–9–0	12	Waterloo	6–18–0
6	Guelph	13–8–3	13	Ryerson	0–24–0
7	Windsor	12–8–4			

Quarterfinals
3	Western Ontario	8
6	Guelph	5
4	Laurentian	1
5	York	4

Semifinals
1	Toronto	3	3	-
5	York	5	4	-
2	Wilfrid Laurier	2	5	-
3	Western Ontario	9	6	-

Championship
5	York	1	4	5
3	Western Ontario	5	3	2

Note: * denotes overtime period(s)

=== 1986 ===
Seed	School	Standings	Seed	School	Standings
1	Wilfrid Laurier	20–3–1	8	Guelph	9–13–2
2	Toronto	19–5–0	9	Brock	7–16–1
3	York	18–5–1	10	Queen's	6–16–2
4	Western Ontario	17–5–2	T–11	Ryerson	5–17–2
5	Windsor	13–6–5	T–11	McMaster	5–17–2
6	Waterloo	11–11–2	13	Royal Military College	5–19–0
7	Laurentian	11–13–0			

Quarterfinals; February 25
3	York	4
6	Waterloo	3
4	Western Ontario	4
5	Windsor	3

Semifinals; February 27–March 4
1	Wilfrid Laurier	3	4	-
4	Western Ontario	2	3	-
2	Toronto	1	4	1
3	York	2	3	2

Championship; March 6, 8
1	Wilfrid Laurier	4	3	-
3	York	6	6	-

Note: * denotes overtime period(s)

=== 1987 ===
Seed	School	Standings	Seed	School	Standings
1	Western Ontario	20–2–2	8	Guelph	8–14–2
2	York	19–2–3	9	Brock	8–15–1
T–3	Toronto	17–5–2	T–10	Queen's	4–15–5
T–3	Waterloo	16–4–4	T–10	Royal Military College	6–17–1
5	Wilfrid Laurier	14–6–4	12	Ryerson	3–18–3
6	Windsor	9–9–6	13	Laurentian ^{†}	5–17–2
7	McMaster	8–13–3			

† Laurentian was penalized 4 points in the standings for using an ineligible player.

Queen's Cup Quarterfinals
1	Western Ontario	7	4	-
8	Guelph	0	1	-
4	Waterloo	4	?	-
5	Wilfrid Laurier	5	?	-
2	York	2	5	-
7	McMaster	1	2	-
3	Toronto	1	1	-
6	Windsor	2	5	-

Queen's Cup Semifinals
1	Western Ontario	9	3	4
4	Wilfrid Laurier	1	4	1
2	York	7	2	2
6	Windsor	1	3	1

Championship
1	Western Ontario	2	5	1
2	York	6	3	2

Note: * denotes overtime period(s)

=== 1988 ===
East			Central			West		
Seed	School	Standings	Seed	School	Standings	Seed	School	Standings
1	Quebec–Trois-Rivières	19–4–2	1	York	20–1–5	1	Windsor	16–7–3
2	McGill	13–8–4	2	Western Ontario	17–4–5	2	Brock	13–10–3
3	Concordia	12–11–2	3	Waterloo	14–6–6	3	Laurentian	10–15–1
4	Ottawa	12–12–1	4	Wilfrid Laurier	13–9–4	4	Ryerson	9–15–2
5	Queen's	6–18–1	5	Toronto	8–13–5	5	McMaster	2–22–2
6	Royal Military College	3–20–2	6	Guelph	6–18–2			

Division Semifinals
E1	Quebec–Trois-Rivières	6	12	-
E4	Ottawa	2	2	-
East
E2	McGill	9	4	8
E3	Concordia	6	7	5
C1	York	8	6	-
C4	Wilfrid Laurier	2	5	-
Central
C2	Western Ontario	5	7	-
C3	Waterloo	3	3	-
W1	Windsor	9	8	-
W4	Ryerson	2	4	-
West
W2	Brock	5	7	-
W3	Laurentian	3	3	-

Division Finals
E1	Quebec–Trois-Rivières	2	4	4
E2	McGill	1	5	2
C1	York	3	5	-
C2	Western Ontario ^{‡}	2	4	-
W1	Windsor	5	4	7
W2	Brock	3	5	3

Conference Semifinals
W1	Quebec–Trois-Rivières	2
C2	Western Ontario	3
C1	York	5
W1	Windsor	2

Queen's Cup Final
C2	Western Ontario	1
C1	York	5

‡ Western Ontario advanced due to having the most regular season points of the Division Final losers.
Note: * denotes overtime period(s)

=== 1989 ===
East			Central			West		
Seed	School	Standings	Seed	School	Standings	Seed	School	Standings
1	Quebec–Trois-Rivières	20–3–3	1	Western Ontario	19–2–5	1	Brock	16–9–1
2	McGill	19–4–3	2	Waterloo	15–8–3	2	Windsor	14–11–1
3	Concordia	14–10–2	3	York	14–9–3	3	Ryerson	13–12–1
4	Queen's	12–12–2	4	Wilfrid Laurier	13–10–3	4	Laurentian	3–22–1
5	Ottawa	8–18–0	5	Toronto	11–12–3	5	McMaster	2–23–1
6	Royal Military College	2–22–2	6	Guelph	7–15–4			

Division Semifinals
E1	Quebec–Trois-Rivières	6	2	15
E4	Queen's	5	3	1
East
E2	McGill	7	5	-
E3	Concordia	3	3	-
C1	Western Ontario	4	3	-
C4	Wilfrid Laurier	5	5	-
Central
C2	Waterloo	2	5	1
C3	York	3	2	3
W1	Brock	3	3	-
W4	Laurentian	1	2	-
West
W2	Windsor	4	6	0
W3	Ryerson	7	3	1

Division Finals
E1	Quebec–Trois-Rivières	6	6	-
E2	McGill	3	4	-
C4	Wilfrid Laurier	4	7	-
C3	York ^{‡}	3	5	-
W1	Brock	5	4	7
W3	Ryerson	3	5	3

Conference Semifinals
W1	Quebec–Trois-Rivières	4
C3	York	5
C4	Wilfrid Laurier	5
W1	Brock	2

Queen's Cup Final
C3	York	0
C4	Wilfrid Laurier	3

‡ York advanced due to being the defending conference champion.
Note: * denotes overtime period(s)

=== 1990 ===
East			West		
Seed	School	Standings	Seed	School	Standings
1	Quebec–Trois-Rivières	15–5–2	1	Wilfrid Laurier	19–3–0
T–2	Ottawa	13–8–1	2	Waterloo	17–4–1
T–2	York	13–8–1	3	Windsor	12–9–1
4	McGill	12–8–2	4	Western Ontario ^{†}	11–9–2
5	Toronto	10–12–0	T–5	Guelph	10–12–0
6	Concordia	9–13–0	T–5	Brock	9–11–2
7	Queen's	8–14–0	7	Laurentian	3–19–0
8	Ryerson	7–15–0	8	Royal Military College	2–20–0

† Due to an infraction, Western Ontario was deducted several points in the standings. The type of violation and the severity of the punishment is not currently available.

Queen's Cup Quarterfinals
E1	Quebec–Trois-Rivières	7	7	-
E4	McGill	3	5	-
East
E2	Ottawa	5	3	2
E3	York	7	1	6
W1	Wilfrid Laurier	9	8	-
W4	Guelph	2	2	-
West
W2	Waterloo	2	5	8
W3	Windsor	3	2	4

Queen's Cup Semifinals
E1	Quebec–Trois-Rivières	3	4	8
E3	York	4	2	2
W1	Wilfrid Laurier	2	5	-
W2	Waterloo	1	2	-

Queen's Cup Final
E1	Quebec–Trois-Rivières	2	1	-
W1	Wilfrid Laurier	6	4	-

Note: * denotes overtime period(s)

=== 1991 ===
East			West		
Seed	School	Standings	Seed	School	Standings
1	Quebec–Trois-Rivières	17–4–1	1	Waterloo	18–2–2
2	Concordia	15–7–0	T–2	Windsor	13–8–1
3	Toronto	14–7–1	T–2	Wilfrid Laurier	13–8–1
4	York	14–8–0	T–2	Western Ontario	12–7–3
5	McGill	12–7–3	5	Guelph	11–10–1
6	Ottawa	8–12–2	6	Laurentian	9–13–0
7	Ryerson	3–19–0	7	Brock	6–16–0
8	Queen's	2–19–1	8	Royal Military College	1–21–0

First Round
E4	York	4
E5	McGill	5
E3	Toronto	4
E6	Ottawa	3
W4	Western Ontario	2
W5	Guelph	3
W3	Wilfrid Laurier	7
W6	Laurentian	4

Queen's Cup Quarterfinals
E1	Quebec–Trois-Rivières	9	6	-
E5	McGill	3	4	-
East
E2	Concordia	1	6	-
E3	Toronto	2	7	-
W1	Waterloo	1	4	2
W5	Guelph	3	0	0
West
W2	Windsor	2	2	-
W3	Wilfrid Laurier	3	9	-

Queen's Cup Semifinals
E1	Quebec–Trois-Rivières	7	6	-
E3	Toronto	1	2	-
W1	Waterloo	3	8	-
W3	Wilfrid Laurier	1	5	-

Queen's Cup Final
E1	Quebec–Trois-Rivières	5	5	-
W1	Waterloo	2	3	-

Note: * denotes overtime period(s)

=== 1992 ===
East			West		
Seed	School	Standings	Seed	School	Standings
1	Quebec–Trois-Rivières	17–4–1	1	Western Ontario	16–5–1
2	McGill	15–5–2	2	Waterloo	16–6–0
3	Toronto	14–6–2	3	Guelph	15–7–0
4	York	11–8–3	4	Wilfrid Laurier	13–7–2
5	Ottawa	10–10–2	5	Windsor	12–10–0
6	Concordia	8–12–2	T–6	Laurentian	7–14–1
7	Queen's	4–17–1	T–6	Brock	7–14–1
8	Ryerson	0–22–0	8	Royal Military College	2–20–0

Queen's Cup Quarterfinals
E1	Quebec–Trois-Rivières	5	6	-
E4	York	2	3	-
East
E2	McGill	4	2	1
E3	Toronto	2	4	2
W1	Western Ontario	3	3	-
W4	Wilfrid Laurier	4	4	-
West
W2	Waterloo	1	4	3
W3	Guelph	2	2	6

Queen's Cup Semifinals
E1	Quebec–Trois-Rivières	4	8	6
E3	Toronto	5	3	1
W4	Wilfrid Laurier	2	4	7
W3	Guelph	3	2	4

Queen's Cup Final
E1	Quebec–Trois-Rivières	8
W4	Wilfrid Laurier	2

Note: * denotes overtime period(s)

=== 1993 ===
East			West		
Seed	School	Standings	Seed	School	Standings
1	Ottawa	17–5–0	T–1	Guelph	16–5–1
2	Toronto	15–6–1	T–1	Wilfrid Laurier	16–5–1
3	Quebec–Trois-Rivières	11–7–4	3	Waterloo	14–5–3
4	McGill	11–8–3	4	Western Ontario	12–8–2
5	Concordia	10–10–2	5	Windsor	9–12–1
6	Queen's	8–11–3	6	Laurentian	7–11–4
7	York	7–13–2	7	Brock	7–13–2
8	Ryerson	1–20–1	8	Royal Military College	0–22–0

First Round
E4	McGill	3
E5	Concordia	2
E3	Quebec–Trois-Rivières	3
E6	Queen's	4
W4	Western Ontario	4
W5	Windsor	8
W3	Waterloo	10
W6	Laurentian	4

Queen's Cup Quarterfinals
E1	Ottawa	3	3	-
E4	McGill	2	2	-
East
E2	Toronto	4	2	11
E6	Queen's	1	5	2
W1	Guelph	5	4	-
W5	Windsor	4	1	-
West
W2	Wilfrid Laurier	4	1	4
W3	Waterloo	2	7	11

Queen's Cup Semifinals
E1	Ottawa	4	4	-
E2	Toronto	5	6	-
W1	Guelph	5	1	4
W3	Waterloo	3	6	2

Queen's Cup Final
E2	Toronto	5
W1	Guelph	4

Note: * denotes overtime period(s)

=== 1994 ===
Far East			Mid East			Mid West			Far West		
Seed	School	Standings	Seed	School	Standings	Seed	School	Standings	Seed	School	Standings
1	Ottawa	16–5–3	1	Guelph	15–10–1	1	Brock	13–12–1	1	Western Ontario	22–1–1
2	Quebec–Trois-Rivières	16–6–2	T–2	Queen's	7–18–1	2	York	10–15–1	2	Wilfrid Laurier	20–3–1
3	Concordia	15–8–1	T–2	Toronto	6–17–3	3	Laurentian	10–16–0	3	Waterloo	12–10–2
4	McGill	13–10–1	4	Royal Military College	2–24–0	4	Ryerson	4–20–2	4	Windsor	8–14–2

Division Semifinal
FE2	Quebec–Trois-Rivières	6
FE3	Concordia	1
ME2	Queen's	1
ME3	Toronto	4
MW2	York	4
MW3	Laurentian	3
FW2	Wilfrid Laurier	5
FW3	Waterloo	2

Division Final
FE1	Ottawa	2	3	-
FE2	Quebec–Trois-Rivières	5	5	-
East
ME1	Guelph	5	5	-
ME3	Toronto	2	4	-
MW1	Brock	3	3	0
MW2	York	2	4	2
West
FW1	Western Ontario	6	5	-
FW2	Wilfrid Laurier	5	4	-

Queen's Cup Semifinals
FE2	Quebec–Trois-Rivières	2
ME1	Guelph	3
MW2	York	1
FW1	Western Ontario	2

Queen's Cup Final
ME1	Guelph	2
FW1	Western Ontario	1

Note: * denotes overtime period(s)

=== 1995 ===
Far East			Mid East			Mid West			Far West		
Seed	School	Standings	Seed	School	Standings	Seed	School	Standings	Seed	School	Standings
1	Quebec–Trois-Rivières	20–1–3	1	Guelph	16–7–3	1	Brock	17–8–1	1	Western Ontario	16–6–2
2	McGill	13–10–1	2	Toronto	9–10–7	2	York	12–12–2	2	Wilfrid Laurier	14–8–2
T–3	Concordia	11–9–4	3	Queen's	3–19–4	3	Laurentian	8–17–1	3	Waterloo	13–9–2
T–3	Ottawa	12–10–2	4	Royal Military College	0–23–3	4	Ryerson	7–19–0	4	Windsor	8–11–5

Division Semifinal
FE2	McGill	3
FE3	Concordia	1
ME2	Toronto	5
ME3	Queen's	4
MW2	York	5
MW3	Laurentian	3
FW2	Wilfrid Laurier	5
FW3	Waterloo	6

Division Final
FE1	Quebec–Trois-Rivières	1	6	6
FE2	McGill	2	3	5
East
ME1	Guelph	7	3	-
ME2	Toronto	3	1	-
MW1	Brock	9	3	3
MW2	York	0	6	5
West
FW1	Western Ontario	6	3	-
FW3	Waterloo	3	1	-

Queen's Cup Semifinals
FE1	Quebec–Trois-Rivières	1
ME1	Guelph	3
MW2	York	2
FW1	Western Ontario	7

Queen's Cup Final
ME1	Guelph	4
FW1	Western Ontario	5

Note: * denotes overtime period(s)

=== 1996 ===
Far East			Mid East			Mid West			Far West		
Seed	School	Standings	Seed	School	Standings	Seed	School	Standings	Seed	School	Standings
1	Quebec–Trois-Rivières	21–5–0	1	Guelph	16–10–0	1	Laurentian	16–9–1	1	Waterloo	21–5–0
2	McGill	15–9–2	2	Toronto	9–15–2	2	York	13–9–4	2	Western Ontario	16–8–2
3	Ottawa	14–10–2	T–3	Royal Military College	7–18–1	3	Brock	10–14–2	3	Windsor	14–11–1
4	Concordia	7–19–0	T–3	Queen's	7–18–1	4	Ryerson	6–17–3	4	Wilfrid Laurier	5–20–1

Division Semifinals
FE2	McGill	3
FE3	Ottawa	5
ME2	Toronto	5
ME3	Royal Military College	2
MW2	York	3
MW3	Brock	4*
FW2	Western Ontario	4
FW3	Windsor	5**

Division Finals
FE1	Quebec–Trois-Rivières	1	6	4**
FE3	Ottawa	5	4	3
East
ME1	Guelph	6	2	5
ME2	Toronto	0	3**	3
MW1	Laurentian	8	5	-
MW3	Brock	4	2	-
West
FW1	Waterloo	6	4	-
FW3	Windsor	4	1	-

Queen's Cup Semifinals
FE1	Quebec–Trois-Rivières	4
ME1	Guelph	2
MW1	Laurentian	1
FW1	Waterloo	4

Queen's Cup Final
FE1	Quebec–Trois-Rivières	1
FW1	Waterloo	5

Note: * denotes overtime period(s)

=== 1997 ===
Far East			Mid East			Mid West			Far West		
Seed	School	Standings	Seed	School	Standings	Seed	School	Standings	Seed	School	Standings
1	Quebec–Trois-Rivières	21–3–2	1	Guelph	21–4–1	1	York	14–9–3	1	Waterloo	18–8–0
2	McGill	14–10–2	2	Toronto	14–10–2	2	Laurentian	14–12–0	2	Windsor	15–8–3
3	Ottawa	13–12–1	3	Queen's	4–18–4	3	Brock	8–16–2	3	Western Ontario	15–11–0
4	Concordia	11–13–2	4	Royal Military College	2–21–3	4	Ryerson	3–21–2	4	Wilfrid Laurier	6–17–3

Division Semifinals
FE2	McGill	7
FE3	Ottawa	2
ME2	Toronto	7
ME3	Queen's	3
MW2	Laurentian	4
MW3	Brock	2
FW2	Windsor	2
FW3	Western Ontario	6

Division Finals
FE1	Quebec–Trois-Rivières	3	4	7
FE2	McGill	4	1	6
East
ME1	Guelph	7	4	-
ME2	Toronto	2	3	-
MW1	York	4	9	-
MW2	Laurentian	2	5	-
West
FW1	Waterloo	2	3	-
FW3	Western Ontario	6	5	-

Queen's Cup Semifinals
FE1	Quebec–Trois-Rivières	1
ME1	Guelph	3
MW1	York	5
FW3	Western Ontario	4

Queen's Cup Final
ME1	Guelph	3
MW1	York	0

Note: * denotes overtime period(s)

== Championships ==
School	Championships
Toronto	8
Guelph	5
York	4
Wilfrid Laurier	3
Quebec–Trois-Rivières	2
Waterloo	2
Queen's	1
Western Ontario	1

== See also ==
- OSLC men's ice hockey tournament
- OIAA men's ice hockey tournament
- QOAA men's ice hockey tournament
- OUA men's ice hockey tournament
