= Lakehead Thunderwolves men's ice hockey =

Canadian university ice hockey team

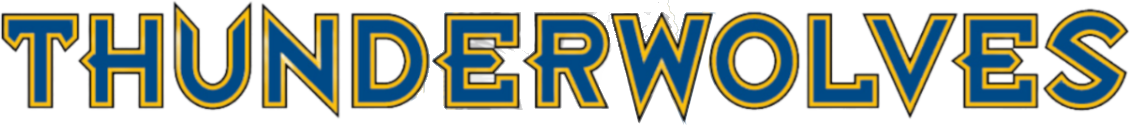
- University: Lakehead University
- Conference: OUA; OUA West Division
- Head coach: Andrew Wilkins; Since 2018–19 season
- Assistant coaches: Jeremy Adduono; Kari Rikkonen
- Arena: Fort William Gardens; Thunder Bay, Ontario
- Colors: Blue, White, and Yellow

U Sports tournament appearances
- 1973, 2003, 2006, 2009, 2010

Conference tournament champions
- 2006

Conference regular season champions
- 1973, 2008

The Lakehead Thunderwolves men's ice hockey team (formerly the Lakehead Nor'Westers) is an ice hockey program representing the Lakehead Thunderwolves athletic department of Lakehead University. The team has been continually active since returning to action in 2002, and is currently a member of the Ontario University Athletics conference under the authority of U Sports. The Thunderwolves play at the Fort William Gardens in Thunder Bay, Ontario.

== History ==
Lakehead University was formed by the merger of Lakehead Technical Institute and Lakehead College of Arts, Science, and Technology in 1965. That year, the college began its ice hockey team as a founding member of the International Collegiate Hockey Association (ICHA), an National Association of Intercollegiate Athletics (NAIA) conference composed mostly of American schools. The Nor'Westers shared a league championship in 1967. Lakehead reached the NAIA championship tournament in 1971, 1973 and 1975, finishing as runners-up twice.

In 1972, the Western Canadian Intercollegiate Athletic Association (WCIAA) split into two divisions, Canada West and the Great Plains Athletic Association (GPAA). The primary reason that Lakehead had joined an American conference was the cost of travel. With the formation of the GPAA, the financial burdens were greatly reduced, giving the Nor'Westers the opportunity to play in their first native league. The team continued with the ICHA and Lakehead jointly played in both until 1977. During this time the Nor'Westers had the unique distinction of appearing in both an American and Canadian national tournament (in 1973), finishing as runners-up in the NAIA field and fifth in the University Cup. In the early 1980s, Lakehead joined the Thunder Bay Hockey League for two seasons.

Lakehead finished near the bottom of the GPAC standings each year after 1978. The next season, Lakehead went winless in 26 games. After the worst season in program history, and with costs mounting, the school suspended the program.

Sixteen years passed before Lakehead returned to the ice. In the interim, the school had joined Ontario University Athletics and changed its moniker to 'Thunderwolves'. After two season, the team received a bid to the University Cup. In the succeeding 10 years, Thunderwolves only produced winning seasons and finished as the national runners-up in 2006. However, since 2014, the program has declined and has only one winning record (as of 2024).

== Season-by-season results ==
=== American Collegiate ===
Note: GP = Games played, W = Wins, L = Losses, T = Ties, OTL = Overtime losses, SOL = Shootout losses, Pts = Points

U Sports champion	U Sports semifinalist	Conference regular season champions	Conference division champions	Conference playoff champions

Season	Conference	Regular season													Conference tournament results	National tournament results
Season	Conference	Conference								Overall					Conference tournament results	National tournament results
Season	Conference	GP	W	L	T	OTL	SOL	Pts*	Finish	GP	W	L	T	%	Conference tournament results	National tournament results
1965–66	ICHA	6	1	5	0	–	–	2	3rd	6	1	5	0	.167		
1966–67	ICHA	12	10	2	0	–	–	20	T–1st	12	10	2	0	.833		
1967–68	ICHA	16	9	7	0	–	–	18	3rd	16	9	7	0	.563		
1968–69	ICHA	16	8	7	1	–	–	17	3rd	16	8	7	1	.531		
1969–70	ICHA	12	4	8	0	–	–	8	3rd	12	4	8	0	.333		
1970–71	ICHA	12	7	4	1	–	–	15	2nd	14	8	5	1	.607		Won semifinal, 6–5 (Gustavus Adolphus); Lost championship, 2–6 (Bemidji State)
1971–72	ICHA	12	5	6	1	–	–	11	T–2nd	12	5	6	1	.458		
1972–73	ICHA	12	4	8	0	–	–	8	3rd	15	6	9	0	.400		Won first round, 8–7 (Augsburg); Won semifinal, 8–4 (Lake Superior State); Lost championship, 2–3 (OT) (Bemidji State)
1973–74	ICHA	12	6	5	1	–	–	13	3rd	12	6	5	1	.542		
1974–75	ICHA	12	8	4	0	–	–	16	2nd	13	8	5	0	.615		Lost first round, 4–8 (St. Thomas)
1975–76	ICHA	12	5	7	0	–	–	10	3rd	12	5	7	0	.417		
1976–77	ICHA	12	6	5	1	–	–	13	T–2nd	12	6	5	1	.542		
Totals										GP	W	L	T/SOL	%	Championships	
Regular season										147	74	68	5	.520	1 ICHA Championship	
Conference postseason										0	0	0	0	–		
NAIA postseason										6	3	3	0	.500	3 National tournament appearances	
Regular season and postseason record										153	77	71	5	.520		

=== Canadian collegiate ===
Note: GP = Games played, W = Wins, L = Losses, T = Ties, OTL = Overtime losses, SOL = Shootout losses, Pts = Points

U Sports champion	U Sports semifinalist	Conference regular season champions	Conference division champions	Conference playoff champions

Season	Conference	Regular season													Conference tournament results	National tournament results
Season	Conference	Conference								Overall					Conference tournament results	National tournament results
Season	Conference	GP	W	L	T	OTL	SOL	Pts*	Finish	GP	W	L	T	%	Conference tournament results	National tournament results
1972–73	GPAA	12	9	3	0	–	–	18	1st	14	9	5	0	.643		Lost West quarterfinal series, 0–2 (Alberta)
1973–74	GPAC	18	6	12	0	–	–	12	4th	18	6	12	0	.333		
1974–75	GPAC	17	7	9	1	–	–	22	3rd	17	7	9	1	.441		
1975–76	GPAC	18	8	10	0	–	–	16	3rd	18	8	10	0	.444		
1976–77	GPAC	22	9	12	1	–	–	19	T–3rd	22	9	12	1	.432		
1977–78	GPAC	22	16	6	0	–	–	26	2nd	25	17	8	0	.680	Lost Championship series, 1–2 (Regina)	
1978–79	GPAC	22	7	14	1	–	–	15	4th	22	7	14	1	.341		
1979–80	GPAC	20	5	15	0	–	–	10	4th	20	5	15	0	.250		
1980–81	GPAC	24	2	22	0	–	–	4	5th	24	2	22	0	.083		
1981–82	GPAC	24	7	15	2	–	–	16	4th	24	7	15	2	.333		
1982–83	GPAC	24	10	14	0	–	–	20	4th	24	10	14	0	.417		
1983–84	GPAC	24	9	14	1	–	–	19	4th	24	9	14	1	.396		
1984–85	GPAC	24	0	24	0	–	–	0	4th	26	0	26	0	.000	Lost semifinal series, 0–2 (Regina)	
Program suspended
2001–02	OUA	24	13	8	3	–	–	29	5th	29	16	10	3	.603	Won division semifinal series, 2–0 (Windsor); Lost division final series, 1–2 (Western Ontario)	
2002–03	OUA	24	18	6	0	–	–	36	3rd	32	23	9	0	.719	Won division semifinal series, 2–0 (Windsor); Won division final series, 2–0 (Western Ontario); Lost semifinal, 1–4 (York); Won bronze medal game, 6–5 (Toronto)	Lost Pool B round-robin, 1–2 (Quebec–Trois-Rivières), 3–4 (New Brunswick)
2003–04	OUA	24	18	4	2	0	–	38	2nd	30	22	6	2	.767	Won division semifinal series, 2–0 (Waterloo); Won division final series, 2–1 (Western Ontario); Lost semifinal, 2–3 (York)	
2004–05	OUA	24	15	8	1	0	–	31	4th	31	20	10	1	.661	Won division quarterfinal series, 2–0 (Guelph); Won division semifinal series, 2–0 (York); Lost division final series, 1–2 (Western Ontario)	
2005–06	OUA	24	13	9	2	0	–	28	7th	36	22	12	2	.639	Won division quarterfinal series, 2–0 (York); Won division semifinal series, 2–1 (Waterloo); Won fivision final series, 2–1 (Wilfrid Laurier); Won Championship, 4–0 (McGill)	Won Pool B round-robin, 4–3 (Acadia), 4–2 (Saskatchewan); Lost championship, 2–3 (Alberta)
2006–07	OUA	28	13	10	3	2	–	31	T–7th	32	15	14	3	.516	Won division quarterfinal series, 2–0 (York); Lost division semifinal series, 0–2 (Wilfrid Laurier)	
2007–08	OUA	28	23	4	–	0	1	47	1st	34	26	7	1	.779	Won division semifinal series, 2–1 (Wilfrid Laurier); Lost division final series, 1–2 (Brock)	
2008–09	OUA	28	18	8	–	1	1	31	T–5th	35	21	13	1	.614	Won division quarterfinal series, 2–0 (Waterloo); Lost division semifinal series, 1–2 (Wilfrid Laurier)	Lost Pool A round-robin, 1–3 (Alberta), 1–2 (New Brunswick)
2009–10	OUA	28	19	7	–	0	2	40	5th	38	26	10	2	.711	Won division quarterfinal series, 2–1 (York); Won sivision semifinal series, 2–0 (Guelph); Won division final series, 2–0 (Western Ontario); Lost championship, 1–3 (McGill)	Lost Pool A round-robin, 7–2 (Quebec–Trois-Rivières), 3–5 (Alberta)
2010–11	OUA	28	16	9	–	3	0	35	7th	30	16	14	0	.533	Lost division quarterfinal series, 0–2 (Waterloo)	
2011–12	OUA	28	19	9	–	0	0	38	4th	34	22	12	0	.647	Won division quarterfinal series, 2–1 (Guelph); Lost division semifinal series, 1–2 (Windsor)	
2012–13	OUA	28	17	9	–	1	1	36	T–6th	30	17	12	1	.583	Lost division quarterfinal series, 0–2 (Waterloo)	
2013–14	OUA	28	17	8	–	2	1	37	6th	35	21	13	1	.614	Won division quarterfinal series, 2–0 (York); Won division semifinal series, 2–0 (Ryerson); Lost division final series, 0–2 (Windsor); Lost third place game, 4–7 (Carleton)	
2014–15	OUA	27	10	14	–	3	0	23	13th	31	12	19	0	.387	Won division quarterfinal series, 2–0 (Western Ontario); Lost division semifinal series, 0–2 (Windsor)	
2015–16	OUA	28	8	16	–	3	1	19	T–16th	28	8	19	1	.304		
2016–17	OUA	28	13	13	–	2	0	28	T–13th	30	13	17	0	.433	Lost division quarterfinal series, 0–2 (York)	
2017–18	OUA	28	11	12	–	3	2	27	T–13th	31	12	17	2	.419	Lost division quarterfinal series, 1–2 (York)	
2018–19	OUA	28	12	15	–	0	1	25	T–16th	28	12	15	1	.446		
2019–20	OUA	28	13	12	–	3	0	29	T–11th	30	13	17	0	.433	Lost division quarterfinal series, 0–2 (Ryerson)	
2020–21	Season cancelled due to COVID-19 pandemic															
2021–22	OUA	16	6	9	–	0	1	.406	16th	16	6	9	1	.406		
2022–23	OUA	27	18	6	–	2	1	39	T–3rd	34	21	12	1	.632	Won division semifinal series, 2–1 (Toronto); Lost division final series, 1–2 (Windsor); Lost bronze medal game, 0–4 (Concordia)	
2023–24	OUA	28	14	12	–	2	0	30	11th	30	14	16	0	.467	Lost division quarterfinal series, 0–2 (Windsor)	
Totals										GP	W	L	T/SOL	%	Championships	
Regular season										853	419	405	29	.508	1 GPAA championship, 1 OUA championship, 1 Far West Division title, 1 West Division title	
Conference postseason										98	52	46	0	.531	1 OUA championship	
U Sports postseason										11	3	8	0	.273	5 National tournament appearances	
Regular season and postseason record										962	474	459	29	.508		

Note: Totals include senior collegiate play only.
