= TMU Bold men's ice hockey =

- University: Toronto Metropolitan University
- Conference: OUA; OUA West Division
- First season: 1948–49; 78 years ago
- Head coach: Johnny Duco; 9th season, 159–76–15 (.666)
- Assistant coaches: Michael Fine; Matt Mistele; Cavin Leth; Larkin Lee; Luke Peressini
- Arena: Mattamy Home Ice; Toronto, Ontario
- Colors: Blue and gold

U Sports tournament appearances
- 2022, 2024, 2025

Conference tournament champions
- 1952, 1954, 1955, 1956, 1957, 1959, 1963

Conference regular season champions
- 1952, 1954, 1956, 1957, 1959, 1963, 2017

The TMU Bold men's ice hockey team (formerly the Ryerson Rams) is an active ice hockey program representing the TMU Bold athletic department of Toronto Metropolitan University. The team has been active since 1948 and is currently a member of the Ontario University Athletics conference under the authority of U Sports. The Bold play at the Mattamy Home Ice in Toronto, Ontario.

== History ==
The Ryerson Rams fielded their first ice hockey team shortly after the end of World War II, playing in the Toronto Hockey League's (THL) Clancy Intermediate League. The team played in various local leagues over the next several years, winning a few championships along the way, before joining their first college-only conference in 1958. Ryerson was a founding member of the Ontario Intermediate Athletic Association (OIAA) and won the inaugural league championship with an undefeated record. The Rams remained one of the better teams in the conference, finishing no worse than second in each of the succeeding four seasons. In 1963, the CIAU began holding a national tournament but decided not to invite the OIAA champion for the first championship. The OIAA then petitioned for entry into the second series. Midway through the 1963–64 season, the league was denied entry into the University Cup and the OIAA immediately dissolved with all league members cancelling their remaining schedule in protest. Over the summer, the CIAU reversed its decision and decided to include the OIAA. The league reformed for the following year with all members returning.

Unfortunately for Ryerson, this was the same time that the Rams had been supplanted by several other league members. Over the next several years, Ryerson was found most often near the bottom of the standings and produced only one winning season (1969). In 1971, there was a great realignment for conferences in Ontario and Quebec with all teams being sorted into two provincial leagues. The Rams remained one of the poorer teams until the mid-70s when the club made its first postseason appearance in more than a decade. A division title followed in 1977, however, the team was unable to find any postseason success at the time. By the end of the decade, Ryerson was back at the bottom of the standings and they remained there for much of the next 35 years. All of Ryerson's varsity teams moved into the Mattamy Athletic Centre in the former Maple Leaf Gardens in 2012. The best the Rams were capable of during this time was a mediocre season but all of that changed in 2016.

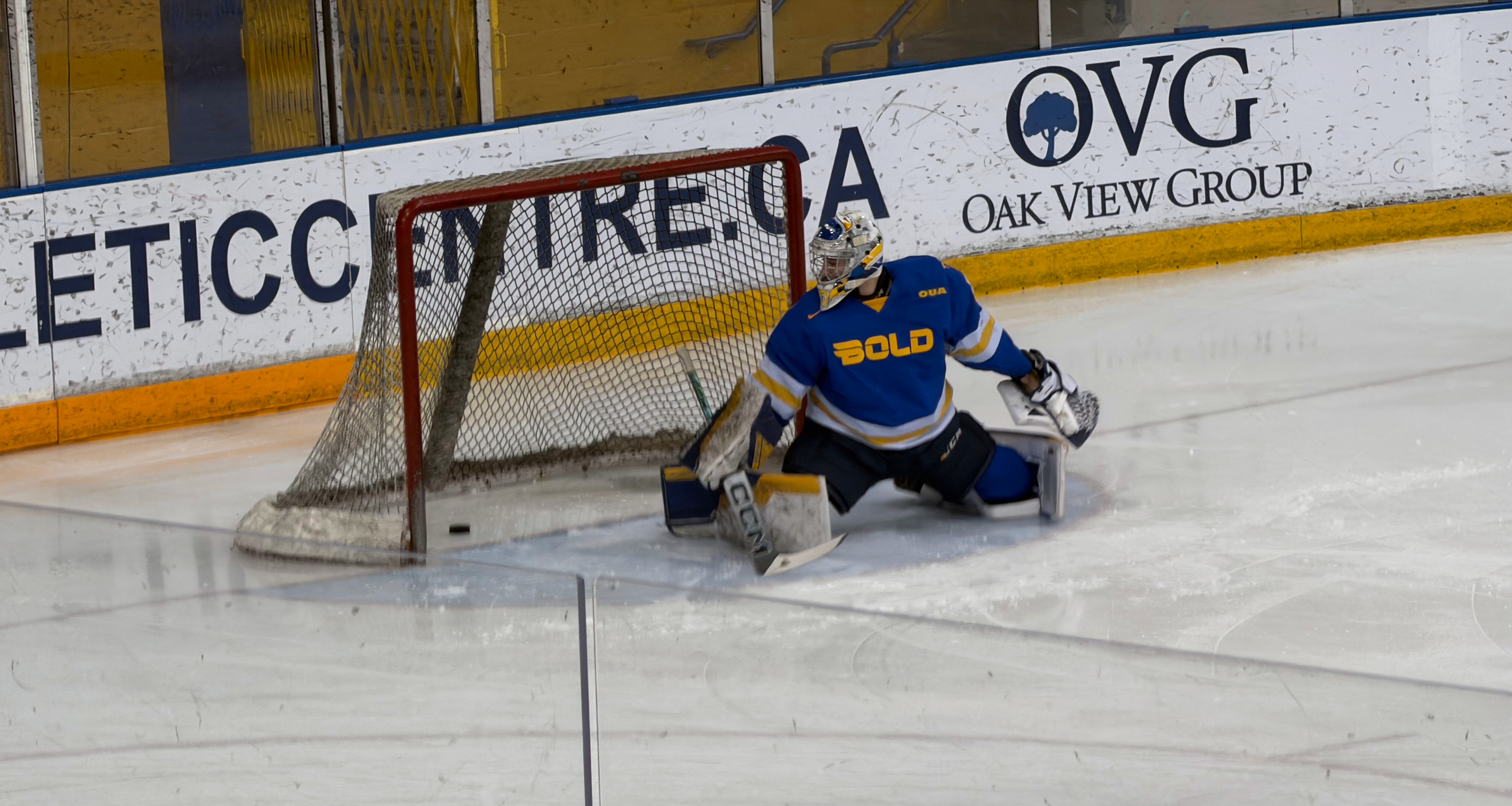
Kai Edmonds holds the program record for career wins (58), and has the second highest career saves (2,297), save percentage (0.923), and appearances (87)

When Johnny Duco took over as interim head coach for the 2016–17, the Rams suddenly went from a middling program to a championship contender. In his first season behind the bench, the Rams won their first regular season title in 54 years. It took several more years before the team was ready to achieve the same level of success in the postseason but, in 2022, the program made its first appearance in the national tournament. The school changed its name to Toronto Metropolitan University that very year, and the newly rechristened Bold swiftly followed up their long-awaited University Cup trip with a second in 2024.

== Season-by-season results ==
The TMU Bold face off against the Toronto Varsity Blues

=== Senior and intermediate play ===
Note: GP = Games played, W = Wins, L = Losses, T = Ties, Pts = Points

| Extra-League Champion | U Sports Semifinalist | Conference regular season champions | Conference Division Champions | Conference Playoff Champions |

| Season | Conference | Regular Season | | | | | | | | | | | Conference Tournament Results | National Tournament Results |
| Season | Conference | Conference | | | | | | Overall | | | | | Conference Tournament Results | National Tournament Results |
| Season | Conference | GP | W | L | T | Pts* | Finish | GP | W | L | T | % | Conference Tournament Results | National Tournament Results |
|---|---|---|---|---|---|---|---|---|---|---|---|---|---|---|
Jack Gropp (1948–1950)
| 1948–49 | THL CIL | ? | ? | ? | ? | ? | ? | ? | ? | ? | ? | ? | Lost Semifinal | |
| 1949–50 | THL IL | 10 | 1 | 9 | 0 | 2 | ? | ? | ? | ? | ? | ? | | |
Julian Smith (1950–1951)
| 1950–51 | IUL | ? | ? | ? | ? | ? | ? | ? | ? | ? | ? | ? | | |
Norm McClelland (1951–1959)
| 1951–52 | MCHL | 4 | 4 | 0 | 0 | 8 | 1st | ? | ? | ? | ? | ? | Won Championship | |
| 1952–53 | COHA | 6 | 3 | 3 | 0 | 6 | ? | ? | ? | ? | ? | ? | | |
| 1953–54 | COHA | ? | ? | ? | ? | ? | 1st | ? | ? | ? | ? | ? | Won Championship | |
| 1954–55 | COHA | 6 | 5 | 0 | 1 | 11 | 1st | ? | ? | ? | ? | ? | Won Championship | |
| 1955–56 | COHA | ? | ? | ? | ? | ? | 2nd | ? | ? | ? | ? | ? | Won Championship | |
| 1956–57 | COHA | 6 | 5 | 0 | 1 | 11 | 1st | ? | ? | ? | ? | ? | Won Championship | |
| 1957–58 | COHA | 10 | 3 | 4 | 3 | 9 | ? | ? | ? | ? | ? | ? | | |
| 1958–59 | OIAA | 10 | 10 | 0 | 0 | 20 | 1st | ? | ? | ? | ? | ? | Won Championship, 6–3 (Ontario Agricultural) | |
Ron Scarcello (1959–1964)
| 1959–60 | OIAA | 7 | 5 | 2 | 0 | 10 | ? | ? | ? | ? | ? | ? | Lost Championship series, 8–9 (Osgoode Hall) | |
| 1960–61 | OIAA | 10 | 6 | 2 | 2 | 14 | 2nd | ? | ? | ? | ? | ? | Lost Championship series, ? (Ontario Agricultural) | |
| 1961–62 | OIAA | 8 | 6 | 2 | 0 | 12 | 2nd | ? | ? | ? | ? | ? | Lost Championship, forfeit (McMaster) | |
| 1962–63 | OIAA | 8 | 8 | 0 | 0 | 16 | 1st | 10 | 9 | 0 | 1 | .950 | Won Championship series, 9–7 (Waterloo Lutheran) | |
| 1963–64 | OIAA | 6 | 3 | 2 | 1 | 7 | N/A ^{†} | 6 | 3 | 2 | 1 | .583 | | |
| Totals | | | | | | | | GP | W | L | T | % | Championships | |
| Regular Season | | | | | | | | ? | ? | ? | ? | ? | 1 MCHL Championship, 3 COHA Championships, 2 OIAA Championships | |
| Conference Post-season | | | | | | | | ? | ? | ? | ? | ? | 1 MCHL Championship, 4 COHA Championships, 2 OIAA Championships | |
| Regular Season and Postseason Record | | | | | | | | ? | ? | ? | ? | ? | | |

† season ended early when the league cancelled its remaining schedule in protest.

=== Senior collegiate ===
Note: GP = Games played, W = Wins, L = Losses, T = Ties, OTL = Overtime Losses, SOL = Shootout Losses, Pts = Points

| U Sports Champion | U Sports Semifinalist | Conference regular season champions | Conference Division Champions | Conference Playoff Champions |

| Season | Conference | Regular Season | | | | | | | | | | | | | Conference Tournament Results | National Tournament Results |
| Season | Conference | Conference | | | | | | | | Overall | | | | | Conference Tournament Results | National Tournament Results |
| Season | Conference | GP | W | L | T | OTL | SOL | Pts* | Finish | GP | W | L | T | % | Conference Tournament Results | National Tournament Results |
|---|---|---|---|---|---|---|---|---|---|---|---|---|---|---|---|---|
Matt Robillard (1964–1967)
| 1964–65 | OIAA | 9 | 3 | 6 | 0 | – | – | 6 | 6th | 9 | 3 | 6 | 0 | .333 | | |
| 1965–66 | OIAA | 9 | 3 | 6 | 0 | – | – | 6 | 5th | 9 | 3 | 6 | 0 | .333 | | |
| 1966–67 | OIAA | 10 | 2 | 8 | 0 | – | – | 4 | 7th | 10 | 2 | 8 | 0 | .200 | | |
Bill Kennedy (1967–1970)
| 1967–68 | OIAA | 12 | 6 | 6 | 0 | – | – | 12 | T–4th | 12 | 6 | 6 | 0 | .500 | | |
| 1968–69 | OIAA | 10 | 6 | 4 | 0 | – | – | 12 | 3rd | 10 | 6 | 4 | 0 | .600 | | |
| 1969–70 | OIAA | 10 | 5 | 5 | 0 | – | – | 10 | T–3rd | 10 | 5 | 5 | 0 | .500 | | |
Brian Jones (1970–1981)
| 1970–71 | OIAA | 10 | 2 | 7 | 1 | – | – | 5 | T–4th | 10 | 2 | 7 | 1 | .250 | | |
| 1971–72 | OUAA | 19 | 2 | 17 | 0 | – | – | 4 | T–13th | 19 | 2 | 17 | 0 | .105 | | |
| 1972–73 | OUAA | 17 | 0 | 17 | 0 | – | – | 0 | 14th | 17 | 0 | 17 | 0 | .000 | | |
| 1973–74 | OUAA | 19 | 4 | 14 | 1 | – | – | 9 | T–12th | 19 | 4 | 14 | 1 | .237 | | |
| 1974–75 | OUAA | 17 | 2 | 15 | 0 | – | – | 4 | 13th | 17 | 2 | 15 | 0 | .118 | | |
| 1975–76 | OUAA | 12 | 7 | 3 | 2 | – | – | 16 | 6th | 13 | 7 | 4 | 2 | .615 | Lost Quarterfinal, 0–14 (York) | |
| 1976–77 | OUAA | 15 | 11 | 3 | 1 | – | – | 23 | 2nd | 16 | 11 | 4 | 1 | .719 | Lost Quarterfinal, 1–11 (York) | |
| 1977–78 | OUAA | 16 | 9 | 6 | 1 | – | – | 19 | 5th | 17 | 9 | 7 | 1 | .559 | Lost Quarterfinal, 0–11 (Toronto) | |
| 1978–79 | OUAA | 16 | 3 | 11 | 2 | – | – | 8 | 11th | 16 | 3 | 11 | 2 | .250 | | |
| 1979–80 | OUAA | 22 | 1 | 20 | 1 | – | – | 3 | T–11th | 22 | 1 | 20 | 1 | .068 | | |
| 1980–81 | OUAA | 22 | 3 | 17 | 2 | – | – | 8 | T–11th | 22 | 3 | 17 | 2 | .182 | | |
Ray Payne (1981–1982)
| 1981–82 | OUAA | 22 | 1 | 21 | 0 | – | – | 2 | 12th | 22 | 1 | 21 | 0 | .045 | | |
Brian Jones (1982–1984)
| 1982–83 | OUAA | 24 | 3 | 21 | 0 | – | – | 6 | T–11th | 24 | 3 | 21 | 0 | .125 | | |
| 1983–84 | OUAA | 24 | 4 | 20 | 0 | – | – | 8 | 13th | 24 | 4 | 20 | 0 | .167 | | |
Jim Cairns (1984–1994)
| 1984–85 | OUAA | 24 | 0 | 24 | 0 | – | – | 0 | 13th | 24 | 0 | 24 | 0 | .000 | | |
| 1985–86 | OUAA | 24 | 5 | 17 | 2 | – | – | 12 | T–11th | 24 | 5 | 17 | 2 | .250 | | |
| 1986–87 | OUAA | 24 | 3 | 18 | 3 | – | – | .188 | 12th | 24 | 3 | 18 | 3 | .188 | | |
| 1987–88 | OUAA | 26 | 9 | 15 | 2 | – | – | 20 | 12th | 28 | 9 | 17 | 2 | .357 | Lost Division Semifinal series, 0–2 (Windsor) | |
| 1988–89 | OUAA | 26 | 13 | 12 | 1 | – | – | 27 | 10th | 32 | 16 | 15 | 1 | .516 | Won Division Semifinal series, 2–1 (Windsor); Lost Division Final series, 1–2 (Brock) | |
| 1989–90 | OUAA | 22 | 7 | 15 | 0 | – | – | 14 | 14th | 22 | 7 | 15 | 0 | .318 | | |
| 1990–91 | OUAA | 22 | 3 | 19 | 0 | – | – | 6 | 14th | 22 | 3 | 19 | 0 | .136 | | |
| 1991–92 | OUAA | 22 | 0 | 22 | 0 | – | – | 0 | 16th | 22 | 0 | 22 | 0 | .000 | | |
| 1992–93 | OUAA | 22 | 1 | 20 | 1 | – | – | 3 | 15th | 22 | 1 | 20 | 1 | .068 | | |
| 1993–94 | OUAA | 26 | 4 | 20 | 2 | – | – | 10 | 15th | 26 | 4 | 20 | 2 | .192 | | |
Lou Carnevale (1994–2000)
| 1994–95 | OUAA | 26 | 7 | 19 | 0 | – | – | 14 | 14th | 26 | 7 | 19 | 0 | .269 | | |
| 1995–96 | OUAA | 26 | 6 | 17 | 3 | – | – | 15 | T–12th | 26 | 6 | 17 | 3 | .288 | | |
| 1996–97 | OUAA | 26 | 3 | 21 | 2 | – | – | 8 | 15th | 26 | 3 | 21 | 2 | .154 | | |
| 1997–98 | OUA | 26 | 3 | 19 | 4 | – | – | 10 | 15th | 26 | 3 | 19 | 4 | .192 | | |
| 1998–99 | OUA | 25 | 6 | 19 | 0 | – | – | 12 | 15th | 25 | 6 | 19 | 0 | .240 | | |
| 1999–00 | OUA | 26 | 9 | 16 | 1 | – | – | 19 | T–13th | 26 | 9 | 16 | 1 | .365 | | |
Ed Kirsten (2000–2004)
| 2000–01 | OUA | 24 | 4 | 20 | 0 | – | – | 8 | 15th | 24 | 4 | 20 | 0 | .167 | | |
| 2001–02 | OUA | 24 | 10 | 14 | 0 | – | – | 20 | 10th | 28 | 12 | 16 | 0 | .429 | Won Division Semifinal series, 2–0 (Royal Military College); Lost Division Final series, 0–2 (Toronto) | |
| 2002–03 | OUA | 24 | 2 | 21 | 1 | – | – | 5 | 15th | 24 | 2 | 21 | 1 | .104 | | |
| 2003–04 | OUA | 24 | 3 | 21 | 0 | 0 | – | 6 | 16th | 24 | 3 | 21 | 0 | .125 | | |
Mick Mitrovic (2004–2006)
| 2004–05 | OUA | 24 | 1 | 22 | 0 | 1 | – | 3 | 16th | 24 | 1 | 23 | 0 | .042 | | |
| 2005–06 | OUA | 24 | 1 | 21 | 1 | 1 | – | 4 | 16th | 24 | 1 | 22 | 1 | .063 | | |
Graham Wise (2006–2016)
| 2006–07 | OUA | 28 | 2 | 23 | 2 | 1 | – | 7 | 16th | 28 | 2 | 25 | 1 | .089 | | |
| 2007–08 | OUA | 28 | 9 | 16 | – | 1 | 2 | 21 | 16th | 28 | 9 | 17 | 2 | .357 | | |
| 2008–09 | OUA | 28 | 5 | 22 | – | 0 | 1 | 11 | 18th | 28 | 5 | 22 | 1 | .196 | | |
| 2009–10 | OUA | 28 | 12 | 13 | – | 0 | 3 | 27 | T–11th | 32 | 14 | 15 | 3 | .484 | Won Division Quarterfinal series, 2–0 (Toronto); Lost Division Semifinal series, 0–2 (Quebec–Trois-Rivières) | |
| 2010–11 | OUA | 28 | 8 | 18 | – | 1 | 1 | 18 | 18th | 28 | 8 | 19 | 1 | .304 | | |
| 2011–12 | OUA | 28 | 13 | 12 | – | 1 | 2 | 27 | T–11th | 31 | 14 | 15 | 2 | .484 | Lost Division Quarterfinal series, 1–2 (Quebec–Trois-Rivières) | |
| 2012–13 | OUA | 28 | 12 | 16 | – | 0 | 0 | 24 | 15th | 30 | 12 | 18 | 0 | .400 | Lost Division Quarterfinal series, 0–2 (Quebec–Trois-Rivières) | |
| 2013–14 | OUA | 28 | 17 | 11 | – | 0 | 0 | 34 | T–8th | 33 | 19 | 14 | 0 | .576 | Won Division Quarterfinal series, 2–1 (Brock); Lost Division Semifinal series, 0–2 (Lakehead) | |
| 2014–15 | OUA | 27 | 14 | 12 | – | 1 | 0 | 29 | 8th | 36 | 27 | 9 | 0 | .750 | Lost Division Quarterfinal series, 0–2 (Toronto) | |
| 2015–16 | OUA | 28 | 14 | 13 | – | 1 | 0 | 29 | 11th | 33 | 17 | 16 | 0 | .515 | Won Division Quarterfinal series, 2–0 (Waterloo); Lost Division Semifinal series, 1–2 (Guelph) | |
Johnny Duco (2016–Present)
| 2016–17 | OUA | 28 | 22 | 4 | – | 2 | 0 | 46 | 1st | 33 | 24 | 9 | 0 | .727 | Won Division Quarterfinal series, 2–1 (Waterloo); Lost Division Semifinal series, 0–2 (Windsor) | |
| 2017–18 | OUA | 28 | 15 | 10 | – | 1 | 2 | 32 | T–9th | 33 | 17 | 14 | 2 | .545 | Won Division Quarterfinal series, 2–1 (Western Ontario); Lost Division Semifinal series, 0–2 (York) | |
| 2018–19 | OUA | 28 | 20 | 5 | – | 2 | 1 | 43 | 2nd | 33 | 23 | 9 | 1 | .712 | Won Division Quarterfinal series, 2–0 (Toronto); Lost Division Semifinal series, 1–2 (Guelph) | |
| 2019–20 | OUA | 28 | 20 | 5 | – | 2 | 1 | 43 | 3rd | 33 | 23 | 9 | 1 | .712 | Won Division Quarterfinal series, 2–0 (Lakehead); Lost Division Semifinal series, 1–2 (Western Ontario) | |
| 2020–21 | Season cancelled due to COVID-19 pandemic | | | | | | | | | | | | | | | |
| 2021–22 | OUA | 15 | 11 | 4 | – | 0 | 0 | .733 | 4th | 22 | 15 | 7 | 0 | .682 | Won Division Quarterfinal, 5–4 (2OT) (Western Ontario); Won Division Semifinal, 4–3 (OT) (Waterloo); Lost Division Final, 2–5 (Brock); Won Bronze Medal Game, 2–1 (McGill) | Won Quarterfinal, 2–1 (New Brunswick); Lost Semifinal, 2–7 (Quebec–Trois-Rivières); Lost Bronze Medal Game, 2–3 (OT) (St. Francis Xavier) |
Program changed name to TMU Bold
| 2022–23 | OUA | 27 | 16 | 9 | – | 2 | 0 | 34 | 8th | 30 | 17 | 13 | 0 | .567 | Lost Division Quarterfinal series, 1–2 (Toronto) | |
| 2023–24 | OUA | 28 | 19 | 8 | – | 1 | 0 | 39 | 4th | 37 | 24 | 13 | 0 | .649 | Won Division Semifinal series, 2–0 (Wilfrid Laurier); Won Division Final series, 2–1 (Brock); Lost Queen's Cup Championship, 2–3 (2OT) (Quebec–Trois-Rivières) | Won Quarterfinal, 2–1 (2OT) (Calgary); Lost Semifinal, 0–7 (New Brunswick); Lost Bronze Medal Game, 2–3 (McGill) |
| 2024–25 | OUA | 28 | 17 | 11 | – | 1 | 0 | 35 | 6th | 37 | 22 | 15 | 0 | .595 | Won Division Semifinal series, 2–0 (Lakehead); Won Division Final series, 2–1 (Toronto); Lost Queen's Cup Championship, 1–4 (Concordia) | Won Quarterfinal, 5–4 (5OT) (Mount Royal); Lost Semifinal, 3–4 (Ottawa); Lost Bronze Medal Game, 1–4 (Saskatchewan) |
| 2025–26 | OUA | 28 | 19 | 9 | – | 0 | 0 | 38 | 4th | 34 | 21 | 13 | 0 | .618 | Won Quarterfinal series, 2–1 (Brock); Lost Semifinal series, 0–2 (Windsor); Lost Bronze Medal Game, 3–4 (OT) (Queen's) | |
| Totals | | | | | | | | | | GP | W | L | T/SOL | % | Championships | |
| Regular Season | | | | | | | | | | 1376 | 455 | 873 | 48 | .348 | 1 OUA Conference Title, 1 Central Division Title, 3 West Division Titles | |
| Conference Post-season | | | | | | | | | | 81 | 37 | 44 | 0 | .457 | | |
| U Sports Postseason | | | | | | | | | | 9 | 3 | 6 | 0 | .333 | 3 National Tournament appearances | |
| Regular Season and Postseason Record | | | | | | | | | | 1432 | 474 | 910 | 48 | .348 | | |

Note: Totals include senior collegiate play only.
