= McMaster Marauders men's ice hockey =

- University: McMaster University
- Colors: Maroon and Gray

U Sports tournament champions
- 1963

U Sports tournament appearances
- 1963

Conference tournament champions
- 1961, 1962, 1963

The McMaster Marauders men's ice hockey team (formerly the McMaster Marlins) was an ice hockey team representing the McMaster Marauders athletics program of McMaster University. McMaster previous fielded a team off-and-on for over 80 years, winning the inaugural University Cup in 1963.

== History ==
McMaster began its ice hockey program in 1902, playing first at the intermediate level. The team remained in the second tier of Canadian college hockey for several years but saw little success. After returning following the end of World War I, McMaster found itself mired at the bottom of the standings and decided to change tack. In 1920, the school decided to field a junior team in the Ontario Hockey Association. After the 20-and-under team went winless, the school abandoned the idea and then left the IIS for the Intermediate Groups. Again, the team went winless and the administration decided to suspend all of its hockey programs afterwards. The Marlins remained dormant for a few years but made a triumphant return in 1925, winning their IIS group in 1926. After taking the following year off, the school decided to support the program once more. McMaster jointly played both Intermediate and Senior hockey for a few years but then began to switch between the two in the early 30s. The club went dormant for a few years after 1935 in part due to financial problems brought about by the Great Depression. The Marlins returned in 1937 but were once again forced off of the ice after the outbreak of World War II.

After the second world war, McMaster returned to the Intermediate level but found that the state of Canadian college hockey had changed. The IIS was not restarted following the war and the schools were left to fend for themselves. McMaster was active at the time but few records of their time in the 40s and 50s persist. In 1958, several of the Intermediate programs took matters into their own hands and formed a new ice hockey league. The Marlins quickly became on the better teams and won the league championship in 1961.

1962–63 McMaster Marlins, national champions

The following season, McMaster was one of three clubs who were invited to join the Quebec–Ontario Athletic Association and they all played concurrently in both conferences. McMaster was league champion in both but lost their playoff match in the QOAA. The following season, the CIAU announced the inaugural University Cup and would invite the league champion of the four major conferences across the country. Because the OIAA was not to be included, McMaster played solely out of the QOAA and repeated as regular season champions. This time, however, they won the postseason championship and advanced to the national tournament. McMaster won a pair of 1-goal games to claim the title as the first national champion in Canadian college history.

After winning the title, McMaster quickly tumbled down the league standings and became a bottom-feeder by the end of the decade. After they were placed in the Ontario University Athletic Association (OUAA) during the great realignment in 1971, McMaster recovered some of their former glory. The team made the conference postseason many times between '72 and '83 with their best performance coming in 1979. Unfortunately, as the 80s wore on, the team experienced another lull and sagged towards the bottom of the standings. 1988 was the worst season the program had ever seen, with the Marauders finishing last in the standings. After an even worse campaign the year after, the school decided that it was too costly to support an expensive losing program and suspended the team for good.

== Season-by-season results ==
=== Senior and collegiate play ===
Note: GP = Games played, W = Wins, L = Losses, T = Ties, Pts = Points

Extra-League Champion	U Sports Semifinalist	Conference regular season champions	Conference Division Champions	Conference Playoff Champions

Season	Conference	Regular Season											Conference Tournament Results	National Tournament Results
Season	Conference	Conference						Overall					Conference Tournament Results	National Tournament Results
Season	Conference	GP	W	L	T	Pts*	Finish	GP	W	L	T	%	Conference Tournament Results	National Tournament Results
1902–03	IIS	?	?	?	?	?	?	?	?	?	?	?	Lost Western Round-Robin, 1–1 (Toronto II)	
1903–04	IIS	?	?	?	?	?	?	?	?	?	?	?	Won Western Semifinal series, 13–11 (Toronto II); Lost Championship, 16–19 (Royal Military College)	
1904–05	IIS	?	?	?	?	?	?	?	?	?	?	?	Lost Semifinal series, ?–? (Toronto II)	
1905–06	IIS	?	?	?	?	?	?	?	?	?	?	?	?	
1906–07	IIS	?	?	?	?	?	?	?	?	?	?	?	Lost Quarterfinal series, 7–16 (Toronto II)	
1907–08	IIS	?	?	?	?	?	?	?	?	?	?	?	Lost Semifinal series, 8–25 (Toronto II)	
1908–09	IIS	?	?	?	?	?	?	?	?	?	?	?	Lost Semifinal series, 9–16 (Toronto II)	
Program suspended
1911–12	IIS	?	?	?	?	?	?	?	?	?	?	?	Lost Championship series, 7–12 (Royal Military College)	
1912–13	IIS	?	?	?	?	?	?	?	?	?	?	?	Won Divisional Final, ?–? (Toronto II); Lost Championship series, 7–17 (Royal Military College)	
1913–14	IIS	?	?	?	?	?	?	?	?	?	?	?	Lost Semifinal series, 5–14 (Toronto II)	
1914–15	IIS	?	?	?	?	?	?	?	?	?	?	?	Lost Semifinal Round-Robin, 1–1 (Toronto II)	
Program suspended due to World War I
1918–19	Intermediate	4	0	4	0	0	3rd	?	?	?	?	?		
1919–20	IIS	5	0	5	0	0	4th	?	?	?	?	?		
1920–21	IIS	?	?	?	?	?	?	?	?	?	?	?		
1920–21	OHA Jr.	4	0	4	0	0	3rd	?	?	?	?	?		
1921–22	Intermediate	6	0	6	0	0	4th	?	?	?	?	?		
Program suspended
1925–26	IIS	4	4	0	0	0	1st	?	?	?	?	?	Lost Championship series, 2–6 (Royal Military College)	
Program suspended
1927–28	IIS	6	2	2	2	6	2nd	?	?	?	?	?		
1928–29	IIS	8	3	5	0	6	4th	?	?	?	?	?		
1928–29	OHA Sr.	6	4	2	0	8	T–1st	?	?	?	?	?	Lost Group Championship series, 2–6 (Georgetown)	
1929–30	IIS	?	?	?	?	?	?	?	?	?	?	?		
1929–30	OHA Sr.	6	2	4	0	4	3rd	?	?	?	?	?		
1930–31	IIS / OHA Sr. B ^{†}	4	0	4	0	0	4th	?	?	?	?	?		
1931–32	IIS	3	0	3	0	0	4th	?	?	?	?	?		
1932–33	IIS	6	1	5	0	2	T–3rd	?	?	?	?	?		
1933–34	OHA Intermediate	6	1	5	0	2	T–3rd	?	?	?	?	?		
1934–35	OHA Intermediate	2	2	0	0	4	T–1st	?	?	?	?	?	Lost First Round series, 9–12 (Waterloo Hockey Club)	
Program suspended
1937–38	IIS	6	0	5	1	1	4th	?	?	?	?	?		
1938–39	IIS	6	3	2	1	7	2nd	?	?	?	?	?		
Program suspended due to World War II
1945–46	OHA Intermediate	3	1	2	0	4	3rd	?	?	?	?	?		
1946–47	Independent	?	?	?	?	?	?	?	?	?	?	?		
1947–48	Independent	?	?	?	?	?	?	?	?	?	?	?		
1948–49	Independent	?	?	?	?	?	?	?	?	?	?	?		
1949–50	Independent	?	?	?	?	?	?	?	?	?	?	?		
1950–51	Independent	?	?	?	?	?	?	?	?	?	?	?		
1951–52	Independent	?	?	?	?	?	?	?	?	?	?	?		
1952–53	Independent	?	?	?	?	?	?	?	?	?	?	?		
1953–54	Independent	?	?	?	?	?	?	?	?	?	?	?		
1954–55	Independent	?	?	?	?	?	?	?	?	?	?	?		
1955–56	Independent	?	?	?	?	?	?	?	?	?	?	?		
1956–57	Independent	?	?	?	?	?	?	?	?	?	?	?		
1957–58	Independent	?	?	?	?	?	?	?	?	?	?	?		
Totals								GP	W	L	T	%	Championships	
Regular Season								?	?	?	?	?	1 IIS Section Championship, 1 OHA Sr. Group Championship, 1 OHA Intermediate Group Championship	
Conference Post-season								?	?	?	?	?		
Regular Season and Postseason Record								?	?	?	?	?		

† The Western section of IIS play was also used for the standings of the OHA Senior B Group 2.

=== Collegiate only ===
Note: GP = Games played, W = Wins, L = Losses, T = Ties, OTL = Overtime Losses, SOL = Shootout Losses, Pts = Points

U Sports Champion	U Sports Semifinalist	Conference regular season champions	Conference Division Champions	Conference Playoff Champions

Season	Conference	Regular Season													Conference Tournament Results	National Tournament Results
Season	Conference	Conference								Overall					Conference Tournament Results	National Tournament Results
Season	Conference	GP	W	L	T	OTL	SOL	Pts*	Finish	GP	W	L	T	%	Conference Tournament Results	National Tournament Results
1958–59	OIAA	?	?	?	?	–	–	?	?	?	?	?	?	?		
1959–60	OIAA	?	?	?	?	–	–	?	?	?	?	?	?	?		
1960–61	OIAA	?	?	?	?	–	–	?	1st	?	?	?	?	?	Won Semifinal, ? Won Championship, ? (Ontario Agricultural)	
1961–62	QOAA	11	10	1	0	–	–	20	1st	?	?	?	?	?	Lost Championship series, 10–13 (Toronto)	
1961–62	OIAA	?	?	?	?	–	–	?	1st	?	?	?	?	?	Won Championship, forfeit (Ryerson)	
1962–63	QOAA	12	12	0	0	–	–	24	1st	16	16	0	0	1.000	Won Championship series, 12–7 (Laval)	Won Semifinal, 4–3 (St. Francis Xavier); Won Championship, 3–2 (British Columbia)
1963–64	QOAA	12	6	5	1	–	–	13	3rd	12	6	5	1	.542		
1964–65	QOAA	16	5	8	3	–	–	13	6th	16	5	8	3	.406		
1965–66	QOAA	16	6	10	0	–	–	12	T–5th	16	6	10	0	.375		
1966–67	QOAA	16	7	9	0	–	–	14	5th	16	7	9	0	.438		
1967–68	QOAA	16	9	5	2	–	–	20	3rd	17	9	6	2	.588	Lost Semifinal, 5–6 (Waterloo)	
1968–69	QOAA	15	5	10	0	–	–	10	T–9th	15	5	10	0	.333		
1969–70	QOAA	14	1	11	3	–	–	4	11th	14	1	11	3	.167		
1970–71	QOAA	15	3	9	3	–	–	9	T–10th	15	3	9	3	.300		
1971–72	OUAA	19	10	8	1	–	–	21	6th	20	10	9	1	.525	Lost Quarterfinal, 1–2 (Guelph)	
1972–73	OUAA	17	8	9	0	–	–	16	10th	17	8	9	0	.471		
1973–74	OUAA	19	6	11	1	–	–	13	10th	19	6	11	1	.361		
1974–75	OUAA	17	9	5	3	–	–	21	7th	18	9	6	3	.583	Lost Quarterfinal, 1–2 (Waterloo)	
1975–76	OUAA	12	9	2	1	–	–	19	2nd	13	9	3	1	.731	Lost Quarterfinal, 1–2 (Guelph)	
1976–77	OUAA	16	7	9	0	–	–	14	10th	16	7	9	0	.438		
1977–78	OUAA	16	11	3	2	–	–	24	4th	17	11	4	2	.706	Lost Quarterfinal, 4–5 (Wilfrid Laurier)	
1978–79	OUAA	16	13	2	1	–	–	27	1st	?	?	?	?	?	Won Quarterfinal, 4–3 (OT) (Toronto); Won Semifinal, ? Lost Championship series, ?–? (Guelph)	
1979–80	OUAA	22	15	2	5	–	–	35	3rd	?	?	?	?	?	results unavailable	
1980–81	OUAA	22	13	7	2	–	–	28	T–5th	23	13	8	2	.609	Lost Quarterfinal, 4–8 (Toronto)	
1981–82	OUAA	22	13	7	2	–	–	28	T–3rd	25	14	9	2	.600	Won Quarterfinal, 6–5 (York); Lost Semifinal series, 0–2 (Guelph)	
1982–83	OUAA	24	14	10	0	–	–	28	5th	25	14	11	0	.560	Lost Quarterfinal, 4–3 (Queen's)	
1983–84	OUAA	24	7	13	4	–	–	18	T–8th	24	7	13	4	.375		
1984–85	OUAA	24	11	12	1	–	–	23	8th	24	11	12	1	.479		
1985–86	OUAA	24	5	17	2	–	–	12	T–11th	24	5	17	2	.250		
1986–87	OUAA	24	8	13	3	–	–	19	7th	24	8	13	3	.396		
1987–88	OUAA	26	2	22	2	–	–	6	17th	26	2	22	2	.115		
1988–89	OUAA	26	2	23	1	–	–	26	17th	26	2	23	1	.096		
Program suspended
Totals										GP	W	L	T/SOL	%	Championships	
Regular Season										503	217	243	43	.474	2 OIAA Championships, 2 QOAA Championships, 1 OUAA Championship, 3 Central Division Titles	
Conference Post-season										11	3	8	0	.273	2 OIAA Championships, 1 QOAA Championships	
U Sports Postseason										2	2	0	0	1.000	1 National tournament appearance	
Regular Season and Postseason Record										516	222	251	43	.472	1 National Championship	

Note: Totals include results from 1962–63 onward except for the 1979 and 1980 conference tournaments.
