= Waterloo Warriors men's ice hockey =

- University: University of Waterloo
- Conference: OUA; OUA West Division
- Head coach: Brian Bourque; Since 2006–07 season
- Assistant coaches: Kyle Sonnenburg; Graeme Swan; Matt McGahey; Mike Moffat
- Arena: CIF Arena; Waterloo, Ontario
- Colors: Black and Gold

U Sports tournament champions
- 1974

U Sports tournament appearances
- 1974, 1991, 1996, 2013

Conference tournament champions
- 1974, 1996

Conference regular season champions
- 1971, 1975, 1991, 1996, 2007

The Waterloo Warriors men's ice hockey team is an active ice hockey program representing the Waterloo Warriors athletic department of the University of Waterloo. The team originally played as an intermediate program but transition to the senior level in 1961, where it had remained ever since.

== History ==
Waterloo Warriors home game

It's unclear exactly when Waterloo played its first ice hockey game but the men's program was one of five founding members of the Ontario Intercollegiate Athletic Association ice hockey conference in 1958. Three years later, Waterloo, along with McMaster, Ontario Agricultural (now known as Guelph) all promoted their teams to senior hockey and joined the Quebec–Ontario Athletic Association. For the first few years, Waterloo finished at or near the bottom of the standings but the program experienced a dramatic turnaround in 1966 when they posted their first winning season. The next year, the Warriors finished second in the conference and made its first postseason appearance as well. Waterloo had swiftly turned itself into a major player in the conference but they could not overcome the dominant power of the time, Toronto, and finished as league runners-up four years in a row. Waterloo looked poised to finally get over the hump in 1971 when they won their first regular season championship but the Warriors proceeded to lose their semifinal match and squander their opportunity.

In 1971, the four extant conferences that shared teams in Quebec and Ontario were broken up and rearranged into two provincial leagues. Waterloo now found itself with twice as many conference opponents and had a difficult time adjusting in the first season. Fortunately, the Warriors soon resolved their issues and returned to being a top team in 1973. The very next year, Waterloo won its first league championship and made its first University Cup appearance. The Warriors downed Calgary in straight sets to advance to the championship game and got into a close battle with Sir George Williams. Waterloo had to come back from a 2–4 deficit in the third to force overtime and then scored twice in the extra session (sudden-death rules were not in effect) to secure a 6–5 victory to win the National Championship.

Waterloo's championship defense was ended the following year thanks to Toronto. Afterwards, the team slipped from their perch and began to yo-yo up and down the standings. The nadir came in 1983 with the program's worst season but it seemed to spark a resurgence in the Warriors and the club soon regained some consistency. Through the late 80's Waterloo was able to make the playoffs every year, finally winning a round in 1990 before managing to earn a second trip to the national tournament in 1991. The team sagged slightly over the succeeding few years but came roaring back in 1996, winning their first conference championship since 1974 and making their second championship game appearance. Unfortunately, the team was unable to recapture the same magic they had in 1974 and fell to Acadia 2–3.

After their second run to the title game, Waterloo slowly tumbled down the standings and eventually bottomed out in the early 21st century. Again, after hitting rock-bottom, the team rebounded and eventually climbed back to the top of the heap in 2007. However, playoff success eluded the Warriors. By the 2010s, Waterloo had slipped back to being a middling team but they still had some gas left in the tank. In 2013, the Warriors went on a run in the postseason, defeating three higher-seeded teams en route to a runner-up finish and a trip to the national tournament. Despite being heavy underdogs, Waterloo beat Canada West champion Alberta before the clock struck 12 on their Cinderella season. The surprising appearance turned out to be a one-off for the Warriors and over the next decade, the team sank to the bottom of the conference standings.

== Season-by-season results ==
=== Senior collegiate play ===
Note: GP = Games played, W = Wins, L = Losses, T = Ties, OTL = Overtime Losses, SOL = Shootout Losses, Pts = Points

U Sports Champion	U Sports Semifinalist	Conference regular season champions	Conference Division Champions	Conference Playoff Champions

Season	Conference	Regular Season													Conference Tournament Results	National Tournament Results
Season	Conference	Conference								Overall					Conference Tournament Results	National Tournament Results
Season	Conference	GP	W	L	T	OTL	SOL	Pts*	Finish	GP	W	L	T	%	Conference Tournament Results	National Tournament Results
1961–62	QOAA	12	2	9	1	–	–	5	8th	12	2	9	1	.208		
1962–63	QOAA	12	3	8	1	–	–	7	T–6th	12	3	8	1	.292		
1963–64	QOAA	12	1	11	0	–	–	2	7th	12	1	11	0	.083		
1964–65	QOAA	16	2	11	3	–	–	7	T–7th	16	2	11	3	.219		
1965–66	QOAA	16	11	3	2	–	–	24	3rd	16	11	3	2	.750		
1966–67	QOAA	16	11	3	2	–	–	24	3rd	18	12	4	2	.722	Won Semifinal, 6–2 (Western Ontario); Lost Championship, 4–9 (Toronto)	
1967–68	QOAA	16	14	2	0	–	–	28	2nd	18	15	3	0	.833	Won Semifinal, 6–5 (McMaster); Lost Championship, 1–8 (Toronto)	
1968–69	QOAA	15	11	3	1	–	–	23	4th	17	12	4	1	.735	Won Semifinal, 4–2 (Laval); Lost Championship, 0–4 (Toronto)	
1969–70	QOAA	15	10	3	2	–	–	22	2nd	17	11	4	2	.706	Won Semifinal, 7–3 (Ottawa); Lost Championship, 4–7 (Toronto)	
1970–71	QOAA	15	12	2	1	–	–	25	1st	16	12	3	1	.781	Lost Semifinal, 3–8 (Queen's)	
1971–72	OUAA	19	7	10	2	–	–	16	10th	19	7	10	2	.421		
1972–73	OUAA	17	10	5	2	–	–	22	4th	19	11	6	2	.632	Won Quarterfinal, 7–0 (Guelph); Lost Semifinal, 2–13 (Toronto)	
1973–74	OUAA	17	12	2	3	–	–	27	3rd	23	18	2	3	.848	Won Quarterfinal, 8–6 (Wilfrid Laurier); Won Semifinal, 8–4 (York); Won Championship, 6–4 (Western Ontario)	Won Semifinal series, 2–0 (Calgary); Won Championship, 6–5 (OT) (Sir George Williams)
1974–75	OUAA	17	14	2	1	–	–	29	1st	19	15	3	1	.816	Won Quarterfinal, 9–6 (McMaster); Lost Semifinal, 3–9 (Toronto)	
1975–76	OUAA	20	9	10	1	–	–	19	9th	20	9	10	1	.475		
1976–77	OUAA	20	9	9	2	–	–	20	7th	22	10	8	4	.545	Lost Quarterfinal, 5–10 (Guelph)	
1977–78	OUAA	20	7	11	2	–	–	16	11th	20	7	11	2	.400		
1978–79	OUAA	16	4	7	5	–	–	13	9th	16	4	7	5	.406		
1979–80	OUAA	22	10	7	5	–	–	25	6th	?	?	?	?	?	results unavailable	
1980–81	OUAA	22	4	17	1	–	–	9	10th	22	4	17	1	.205		
1981–82	OUAA	22	7	13	2	–	–	16	T–9th	22	7	13	2	.364		
1982–83	OUAA	24	2	21	1	–	–	5	13th	24	2	21	1	.104		
1983–84	OUAA	24	10	11	3	–	–	23	7th	24	10	11	3	.479		
1984–85	OUAA	24	6	18	0	–	–	12	12th	24	6	18	0	.250		
1985–86	OUAA	24	11	11	2	–	–	24	6th	25	11	12	2	.480	Lost Quarterfinal, 3–4 (Western Ontario)	
1986–87	OUAA	24	16	4	4	–	–	.750	T–3rd	26	16	6	4	.692	Lost Quarterfinal series, 0–2 (Wilfrid Laurier)	
1987–88	OUAA	26	14	6	6	–	–	34	5th	28	14	8	6	.607	Lost Quarterfinal series, 0–2 (Western Ontario)	
1988–89	OUAA	26	15	8	3	–	–	33	T–4th	29	16	10	3	.603	Lost Quarterfinal series, 1–2 (York)	
1989–90	OUAA	22	17	4	1	–	–	35	2nd	27	19	7	1	.722	Won Quarterfinal series, 2–1 (Windsor); Lost Semifinal series, 0–2 (Wilfrid Laurier)	
1990–91	OUAA	22	18	2	2	–	–	38	1st	30	22	6	2	.767	Won Quarterfinal series, 2–1 (Guelph); Won Semifinal series, 2–0 (Wilfrid Laurier); Lost Championship series, 0–2 (Quebec–Trois-Rivières)	Lost Semifinal, 4–5 (Alberta)
1991–92	OUAA	22	16	6	0	–	–	32	3rd	25	17	8	0	.680	Lost Quarterfinal series, 1–2 (Guelph)	
1992–93	OUAA	22	14	5	3	–	–	31	5th	29	18	8	3	.672	Won First Round, 8–4 (Western Ontario); Won Quarterfinal series, 2–1 (Wilfrid Laurier); Lost Semifinal series, 1–2 (Guelph)	
1993–94	OUAA	24	12	10	2	–	–	26	8th	25	12	11	2	.520	Lost Division Semifinal, 2–5 (Wilfrid Laurier)	
1994–95	OUAA	24	13	9	2	–	–	28	6th	27	14	11	2	.556	Won Division Semifinal, 6–5 (Wilfrid Laurier); Lost Division Final series, 0–2 (Western Ontario)	
1995–96	OUAA	26	21	5	0	–	–	32	T–1st	32	26	6	0	.813	Won Division Final series, 2–0 (Windsor); Won Semifinal, 4–1 (Laurentian); Won Championship, 5–1 (Quebec–Trois-Rivières)	Won Semifinal, 5–2 (Calgary); Lost Championship, 2–3 (Acadia)
1996–97	OUAA	26	18	8	0	–	–	43	3rd	28	18	10	0	.692	Lost Division Final series, 0–2 (Western Ontario)	
1997–98	OUA	26	15	7	4	–	–	34	4th	32	17	11	4	.594	Won Division Semifinal series, 2–1 (Western Ontario); Lost Division Final series, 0–3 (Windsor)	
1998–99	OUA	26	11	8	7	–	–	29	7th	31	13	11	7	.532	Won Division Final series, 2–1 (Wilfrid Laurier); Lost Division Final series, 0–2 (Windsor)	
1999–00	OUA	26	9	16	1	–	–	19	T–13th	26	9	16	1	.365		
2000–01	OUA	24	15	7	2	–	–	32	4th	29	17	10	2	.621	Won Division Semifinal series, 2–1 (Wilfrid Laurier); Lost Division Final series, 0–2 (Windsor)	
2001–02	OUA	24	3	20	1	–	–	7	16th	24	3	20	1	.146		
2002–03	OUA	24	1	22	1	–	–	3	16th	24	1	22	1	.063		
2003–04	OUA	24	8	14	0	2	–	18	13th	26	8	18	0	.308	Lost Division Quarterfinal series, 0–2 (Lakehead)	
2004–05	OUA	24	13	8	3	0	–	29	T–7th	30	16	11	3	.583	Won Division Quarterfinal series, 2–1 (Wilfrid Laurier); Lost Division Semifinal series, 1–2 (Western Ontario)	
2005–06	OUA	24	15	6	3	0	–	17	4th	30	18	9	3	.650	Won Division Quarterfinal series, 2–1 (Brock); Lost Division Semifinal series, 1–2 (Wilfrid Laurier)	
2006–07	OUA	28	21	4	2	1	–	45	T–1st	33	23	8	2	.727	Won Division Semifinal series, 2–1 (Western Ontario); Division Final series, 0–2 (Wilfrid Laurier)	
2007–08	OUA	28	18	10	–	0	0	36	6th	31	19	12	0	.613	Lost Division Quarterfinal series, 1–2 (Wilfrid Laurier)	
2008–09	OUA	28	18	7	–	0	3	39	4th	30	18	9	3	.650	Lost Division Quarterfinal series, 0–2 (Lakehead)	
2009–10	OUA	28	20	7	–	0	1	41	4th	31	21	9	1	.694	Lost Division Quarterfinal series, 1–2 (Windsor)	
2010–11	OUA	28	15	12	–	0	1	31	T–10th	33	18	14	1	.561	Won Division Quarterfinal series, 2–0 (Lakehead); Lost Division Semifinal series, 1–2 (Western Ontario)	
2011–12	OUA	28	15	9	–	3	1	34	7th	30	15	14	1	.517	Lost Division Quarterfinal series, 0–2 (Brock)	
2012–13	OUA	28	12	11	–	0	5	29	12th	37	19	13	5	.581	Won Division Quarterfinal series, 2–0 (Lakehead); Won Division Semifinal series, 2–0 (Western Ontario); Won Division Final series, 2–0 (Windsor); Lost Queen's Cup Final, 1–4 (Quebec–Trois-Rivières)	Lost Pool A Round–Robin, 2–1 (Alberta), 1–5 (Saint Mary's)
2013–14	OUA	28	12	12	–	2	2	28	T–12th	28	12	14	2	.464		
2014–15	OUA	27	17	8	–	1	1	35	6th	30	18	11	1	.617	Lost Division Quarterfinal series, 1–2 (Guelph)	
2015–16	OUA	28	16	11	–	1	0	33	T–8th	30	16	14	0	.533	Lost Division Quarterfinal series, 0–2 (Ryerson)	
2016–17	OUA	28	12	12	–	4	0	28	T–13th	31	13	18	0	.419	Lost Division Quarterfinal series, 1–2 (Ryerson)	
2017–18	OUA	28	9	15	–	3	1	22	T–16th	28	9	18	1	.339		
2018–19	OUA	28	10	13	–	4	1	25	T–16th	28	10	17	1	.375		
2019–20	OUA	28	11	15	–	2	0	24	16th	28	11	17	0	.393		
2020–21	Season cancelled due to COVID-19 pandemic															
2021–22	OUA	16	8	8	–	0	0	.500	T–12th	16	4	10	2	.313	Won Division Quarterfinal, 4–1 (Toronto); Lost Lost Division Semifinal, 3–4 (OT) (Ryerson)	
2022–23	OUA	27	6	18	–	1	2	15	18th	27	6	19	2	.259		
2023–24	OUA	28	4	19	–	4	1	13	18th	28	4	23	1	.161		
Totals										GP	W	L	T/SOL	%	Championships	
Regular Season										1389	674	595	110	.529	4 Far West Division Titles, 1 West Division Titles, 1 West Division Titles, 1 QOAA Championships, 3 OUAA Championships, 1 OUA Championships	
Conference Post-season										114	54	70	0	.435	2 OUAA Championships	
U Sports Postseason										7	4	3	0	.571	4 National Tournament appearances	
Regular Season and Postseason Record										1510	732	668	110	.521	1 National Championship	

Note: Totals include senior collegiate play only except for 1979–80.

== See also ==
- Waterloo Warriors women's ice hockey
