= Laurier Golden Hawks men's ice hockey =

- University: Wilfrid Laurier University
- Conference: OUA; OUA West Division
- Head coach: Kevin Forrest; Since 2022–23 season
- Assistant coaches: Jerome Dupont; Peter Soligo; Dave Dolecki
- Arena: Waterloo Memorial Recreation Complex; Waterloo, Ontario
- Colors: Purple and Gold

U Sports tournament appearances
- 1983, 1986, 1989, 1990, 1992, 2001, 2006, 2007

Conference tournament champions
- 1983, 1989, 1990,

Conference regular season champions
- 1986, 1990, 2006, 2009

The Laurier Golden Hawks men's ice hockey team (formerly the Waterloo Ice Mules and Waterloo Lutheran Golden Hawks) is an active ice hockey program representing the Laurier Golden Hawks athletic department of Wilfrid Laurier University. The team has been continually active since the early 1960s and is currently a member of the Ontario University Athletics conference under the authority of U Sports. The Golden Hawks play at the Waterloo Memorial Recreation Complex in Waterloo, Ontario.

== History ==
=== Waterloo ===
The first appearance for the Waterloo Ice Mules hockey team appears to be in the 1933–34 OHA Intermediate Groups. The Mules finished last in their Group (6) in consecutive years and went dormant after the 1935 season. The team did not return to the ice until at least 1958 when they became founding members of the Ontario Intermediate Athletic Association (OIAA), a confederation of Intermediate (2nd tier) college programs from Southern Ontario that had thus far been unable to find a place in any other conference. The team's best finish in the OIAA came in 1963 when they reached the league championship. The following year, the conference petitioned CIAU for a bid into the University Cup but were denied. In response, the entire league cancelled their schedules midway through the year. That summer, the CIAU reversed their decision and conferred an automatic bid for the conference champion.

After restarting the conference, the OIAA often didn't hold a playoff, leaving the bid to be awarded to the regular season champion. Waterloo Lutheran finished second three times before the playoff was reinstated but failed to win any postseason game afterwards. In 1971, the four conferences that had teams in Ontario and Quebec were realigned provincially with Waterloo Lutheran being lumped into the 14-team Ontario University Athletic Association (OUAA). For two seasons the program wallowed near the bottom of the standings and was largely uncompetitive.

During this period, Waterloo College and Waterloo University are sometimes confused with one another.

=== Wilfrid Laurier ===
After the college renamed itself in honor of the former Prime Minister, The Golden Hawks saw a decided improvement in their play. Laurier returned to the playoffs in 1974 and won their first division title in 1977. A few off years followed but, by 1983, the Hawks were able to make their first appearance in the University Cup tournament. A surprise OUAA championship in 1989 heralded two consecutive runner-up finishes in the national series but, within a few years, the team had faded back into the pack.

Laurier became a mediocre team for much of the next 30 years, though they were able to make a trip back to the University Cup in 2007.

== Season-by-season results ==
=== Senior and intermediate play ===
Note: GP = Games played, W = Wins, L = Losses, T = Ties, Pts = Points

Extra-League Champion	U Sports Semifinalist	Conference regular season champions	Conference Division Champions	Conference Playoff Champions

Season	Conference	Regular Season											Conference Tournament Results	National Tournament Results
Season	Conference	Conference						Overall					Conference Tournament Results	National Tournament Results
Season	Conference	GP	W	L	T	Pts*	Finish	GP	W	L	T	%	Conference Tournament Results	National Tournament Results
1933–34	OHA Intermediate	6	0	6	0	0	4th	?	?	?	?	?		
1934–35	OHA Intermediate	14	3	10	1	7	4th	?	?	?	?	?	Lost Semifinal	
1958–59	OIAA	?	?	?	?	?	?	?	?	?	?	?		
1959–60	OIAA	?	?	?	?	?	?	?	?	?	?	?		
Program changed name to Waterloo Lutheran Golden Hawks
1960–61	OIAA	?	?	?	?	?	?	?	?	?	?	?		
1961–62	OIAA	?	?	?	?	?	?	?	?	?	?	?		
1962–63	OIAA	?	?	?	?	?	?	?	?	?	?	?	Lost Championship series, 7–9 (Ryerson)	
1963–64	OIAA	?	?	?	?	?	N/A ^{†}	?	?	?	?	?		
Totals								GP	W	L	T	%	Championships	
Regular Season								?	?	?	?	?		
Conference Post-season								?	?	?	?	?		
Regular Season and Postseason Record								?	?	?	?	?		

† season ended early when the league cancelled its remaining schedule in protest.

=== Senior collegiate ===
Note: GP = Games played, W = Wins, L = Losses, T = Ties, OTL = Overtime Losses, SOL = Shootout Losses, Pts = Points

U Sports Champion	U Sports Semifinalist	Conference regular season champions	Conference Division Champions	Conference Playoff Champions

Season	Conference	Regular Season													Conference Tournament Results	National Tournament Results
Season	Conference	Conference								Overall					Conference Tournament Results	National Tournament Results
Season	Conference	GP	W	L	T	OTL	SOL	Pts*	Finish	GP	W	L	T	%	Conference Tournament Results	National Tournament Results
1964–65	OIAA	7	4	3	0	–	–	.571	3rd	7	4	3	0	.571		
1965–66	OIAA	10	6	2	2	–	–	14	2nd	10	6	2	2	.700		
1966–67	OIAA	12	9	3	0	–	–	18	2nd	12	9	3	0	.750		
1967–68	OIAA	12	7	5	0	–	–	14	3rd	12	7	5	0	.583		
1968–69	OIAA	10	7	3	0	–	–	14	2nd	10	7	3	0	.700		
1969–70	OIAA	10	4	4	2	–	–	10	T–3rd	11	4	5	2	.455	Lost Semifinal, 2–8 (Laurentian)	
1970–71	OIAA	10	6	4	0	–	–	12	3rd	11	6	5	0	.545	Lost Semifinal, 1–8 (York)	
1971–72	OUAA	19	5	10	4	–	–	14	11th	19	5	10	4	.368		
1972–73	OUAA	17	3	14	0	–	–	6	12th	17	3	14	0	.176		
Program changed name to Wilfrid Laurier Golden Hawks
1973–74	OUAA	18	8	9	1	–	–	17	8th	19	8	10	1	.447	Lost Quarterfinal, 6–8 (Waterloo)	
1974–75	OUAA	17	11	5	1	–	–	23	5th	18	11	6	1	.639	Lost Quarterfinal, 3–12 (Western Ontario)	
1975–76	OUAA	20	6	10	4	–	–	16	10th	20	6	10	4	.400		
1976–77	OUAA	20	13	6	1	–	–	27	2nd	22	14	7	1	.659	Won Quarterfinal, 9–0 (Brock); Lost Semifinal, 1–6 (Toronto)	
1977–78	OUAA	20	17	2	1	–	–	35	2nd	24	19	4	1	.813	Won Quarterfinal, 5–4 (McMaster); Won Semifinal, 6–0 (Western Ontario); Lost Championship series, 0–2 (Toronto)	
1978–79	OUAA	16	9	5	2	–	–	20	5th	17	9	6	2	.588	Lost Quarterfinal, ? (Western Ontario)	
1979–80	OUAA	22	5	14	3	–	–	13	9th	22	5	14	3	.295		
1980–81	OUAA	22	12	8	2	–	–	26	7th	22	12	8	2	.591		
1981–82	OUAA	22	12	7	3	–	–	27	T–5th	25	13	9	3	.580	Won Quarterfinal, 7–3 (Queen's); Lost Semifinal series, 0–2 (Toronto)	
1982–83	OUAA	24	19	4	1	–	–	39	3rd	32	25	6	1	.797	Won Quarterfinal, 5–4 (York); Won Semifinal series, 2–1 (Western Ontario); Won Championship series, 2–0 (Toronto)	Lost Pool 2 Round-Robin, 5–4 (Brandon), 1–10 (Saskatchewan)
1983–84	OUAA	24	15	3	6	–	–	36	2nd	27	16	5	6	.704	Lost Semifinal series, 1–2 (Western Ontario)	
1984–85	OUAA	24	18	2	4	–	–	40	2nd	27	19	4	4	.778	Lost Semifinal series, 1–2 (Western Ontario)	
1985–86	OUAA	24	20	3	1	–	–	41	1st	30	22	7	1	.750	Won Semifinal series, 2–0 (Western Ontario); Lost Championship series, 0–2 (York)	Lost Quarterfinal series, 0–2 (Moncton)
1986–87	OUAA	24	14	6	4	–	–	.667	5th	29	17	8	4	.655	Won Quarterfinal series, 2–0 (Waterloo); Lost Semifinal series, 1–2 (Western Ontario)	
1987–88	OUAA	26	13	9	4	–	–	30	7th	28	13	11	4	.536	Lost Division Semifinal series, 0–2 (York)	
1988–89	OUAA	26	13	10	3	–	–	29	T–8th	34	20	11	3	.632	Won Division Semifinal series, 2–0 (Western Ontario); Won Division Final series, 2–0 (York); Won Semifinal, 5–2 (Brock); Won Championship, 3–0 (York)	Won Semifinal, 8–4 (Moncton); Lost Championship, 2–5 (York)
1989–90	OUAA	22	19	3	0	–	–	38	1st	30	26	4	0	.867	Won Quarterfinal series, 2–0 (Guelph); Won Semifinal series, 2–0 (Waterloo); Won Championship series, 2–0 (Quebec–Trois-Rivières)	Won Semifinal, 2–1 (Quebec–Trois-Rivières); Lost Championship, 1–2 (Moncton)
1990–91	OUAA	22	13	8	1	–	–	27	T–6th	27	16	10	1	.611	Won First Round, 7–4 (Laurentian); Won Quarterfinal series, 2–0 (Windsor); Lost Semifinal series, 0–2 (Waterloo)	
1991–92	OUAA	22	13	7	2	–	–	28	7th	28	17	9	2	.643	Won Division Quarterfinal series, 2–0 (Western Ontario); Won Semifinal series, 2–1 (Guelph); Lost Championship, 2–8 (Quebec–Trois-Rivières)	Lost Semifinal, 2–5 (Acadia)
1992–93	OUAA	22	16	5	1	–	–	33	T–2nd	25	17	7	1	.700	Lost Quarterfinal series, 1–2 (Waterloo)	
1993–94	OUAA	24	20	3	1	–	–	41	2nd	27	21	5	1	.796	Won Division Semifinal, 5–2 (Waterloo); Lost Division Final series, 0–2 (Western Ontario)	
1994–95	OUAA	24	14	8	2	–	–	30	5th	25	14	9	2	.600	Lost Division Semifinal, 5–6 (Waterloo)	
1995–96	OUAA	26	5	20	1	–	–	11	16th	26	5	20	1	.212		
1996–97	OUAA	26	6	17	3	–	–	15	13th	26	6	17	3	.288		
1997–98	OUA	26	6	18	2	–	–	14	14th	26	6	18	2	.269		
1998–99	OUA	26	14	7	5	–	–	33	5th	29	15	9	5	.603	Lost Division Semifinal series, 1–2 (Waterloo)	
1999–00	OUA	26	11	10	5	–	–	27	7th	30	13	12	5	.517	Won Division Semifinal series, 2–0 (Windsor); Lost Division Final series, 0–2 (Western Ontario)	
2000–01	OUA	24	9	11	4	–	–	22	10th	29	11	14	4	.448	Lost Division Semifinal series, 1–2 (Waterloo)	Lost Pool B Round-Robin, 1–6 (Quebec–Trois-Rivières), 3–2 (St. Thomas)
2001–02	OUA	24	8	14	2	–	–	18	T–11th	24	8	14	2	.375		
2002–03	OUA	24	12	11	1	–	–	25	8th	29	15	13	1	.534	Won Division Semifinal series, 2–0 (Brock); Lost Division Final series, 1–2 (York)	
2003–04	OUA	24	10	8	3	3	–	26	7th	28	12	13	3	.482	Won Division Semifinal series, 2–0 (Brock); Lost Division Final series, 0–2 (York)	
2004–05	OUA	24	12	10	2	0	–	26	10th	27	13	12	2	.519	Lost Division Semifinal series, 1–2 (Waterloo)	
2005–06	OUA	24	13	8	2	1	–	29	T–5th	32	16	14	2	.531	Won Division Semifinal series, 2–1 (Waterloo); Lost Division Final series, 1–2 (Lakehead)	Lost Pool A Round-Robin, 3–4 (McGill), 2–8 (Alberta)
2006–07	OUA	28	22	5	1	0	–	45	1st	35	27	7	1	.786	Won Division Semifinal series, 2–0 (Lakehead); Won Division Final series, 2–0 (Waterloo); Lost Championship, 3–5 (Quebec–Trois-Rivières)	Lost Pool A Round-Robin, 4–3 (St. Francis Xavier), 4–5 (Moncton)
2007–08	OUA	28	16	9	–	1	2	39	7th	34	19	13	2	.588	Won Division Quarterfinal series, 2–1 (Waterloo); Lost Division Semifinal series, 1–2 (Lakehead)	
2008–09	OUA	28	22	5	–	1	0	45	1st	33	24	9	0	.727	Won Division Semifinal series, 2–1 (Lakehead); Lost Division Final series, 0–2 (Western Ontario)	
2009–10	OUA	28	17	7	–	4	0	38	6th	31	18	13	0	.581	Lost Division Quarterfinal series, 1–2 (Guelph)	
2010–11	OUA	28	15	7	–	2	4	36	6th	34	18	12	4	.588	Won Division Quarterfinal series, 2–1 (Ontario Tech); Lost Division Semifinal series, 1–2 (Guelph)	
2011–12	OUA	28	9	17	–	1	1	20	17th	30	9	20	1	.317	Lost Division Quarterfinal series, 0–2 (Western Ontario)	
2012–13	OUA	28	14	12	–	2	0	30	T–10th	31	15	16	0	.484	Lost Division Quarterfinal series, 1–2 (Guelph)	
2013–14	OUA	28	9	17	–	2	0	20	T–16th	28	9	19	0	.321		
2014–15	OUA	27	10	16	–	1	0	21	T–16th	27	10	17	0	.370		
2015–16	OUA	28	14	14	–	0	0	28	T–12th	30	14	16	0	.467	Lost Division Quarterfinal series, 0–2 (Western Ontario)	
2016–17	OUA	28	15	9	–	3	1	34	9th	31	16	14	1	.532	Lost Division Quarterfinal series, 1–2 (Windsor)	
2017–18	OUA	28	15	10	–	1	2	32	T–9th	30	15	13	2	.533	Lost Division Quarterfinal series, 0–2 (Brock)	
2018–19	OUA	28	13	14	–	1	0	27	T–12th	30	13	17	0	.433	Lost Division Quarterfinal series, 0–2 (Western Ontario)	
2019–20	OUA	28	13	12	–	2	1	29	T–11th	31	14	16	1	.468	Lost Division Quarterfinal series, 1–2 (Guelph)	
2020–21	Season cancelled due to COVID-19 pandemic															
2021–22	OUA	16	8	7	–	1	0	.531	10th	17	8	8	1	.500	Lost Division Quarterfinal, 2–5 (Brock)	
2022–23	OUA	27	13	13	–	1	0	27	T–12th	30	14	16	0	.467	Lost Division Quarterfinal series, 1–2 (Brock)	
2023–24	OUA	28	13	13	–	1	1	28	12th	33	16	16	1	.500	Won Play-In, 5–4 (OT) (Nipissing); Won Division Quarterfinal series, 2–0 (Toronto); Lost Division Semifinals series, 0–2 (Toronto Metropolitan)	
Totals										GP	W	L	T/SOL	%	Championships	
Regular Season										1327	695	532	100	.561	2 OUAA Championships, 2 OUA Championships, 4 West Division Title, 2 Mid-West Division Titles, 1 Far-West Division Title	
Conference Post-season										146	70	76	0	.479	3 OUAA Championships	
U Sports Postseason										15	5	10	0	.364	8 National Tournament appearances	
Regular Season and Postseason Record										1488	770	618	100	.551		

Note: Totals include senior collegiate play only.
