= Laurentian Voyageurs men's ice hockey =

- University: Laurentian University
- Arena: Sudbury, Ontario
- Colors: Blue and Gold

U Sports tournament appearances
- 1965, 1966, 1967, 1968, 1969, 1971

Conference tournament champions
- 1965, 1971

Conference regular season champions
- 1965, 1966, 1967, 1968, 1969, 1971

The Laurentian Voyageurs men's ice hockey team was an ice hockey program representing the Laurentian Voyageurs athletic department of Laurentian University. The team played for approximately 45 years before the 2021 Laurentian University financial crisis necessitated the termination of several athletic programs, including the ice hockey teams.

== History ==
Laurentian University was just two years old when it decided to field its first varsity intercollegiate sport. 1962 saw the club hit the ice for the first time as members of the Ontario Intermediate Athletic Association (OIAA) an Intermediate (2nd tier) conference. By season's end the program had not only made its first postseason appearance but also earn its moniker as the 'Voyageurs'. The very next season, looking to raise its profile to the senior collegiate level, the OIAA petitioned the CIAU for a bid into the University Cup tournament but were denied. In response, the entire league cancelled its schedule midway through the year. That summer, the CIAU reversed their decision and conferred an automatic bid for the conference champion. The timing couldn't have been better for Laurentian as the team won six of the next seven championships, making trips to the national tournament each time. For a new program, the Voyageurs did well in University Cup play, finishing third twice and as runners-up in 1967.

In 1971, the four conferences that had teams in Ontario and Quebec were realigned provincially and Laurentian found that its path to the national tournament had gotten far more difficult. The Voyageurs were unable to weave their way through the gauntlet of teams in the Ontario University Athletic Association (OUAA) and never again reached a University Cup. By the 1990s, the team's lack of success had almost become expected and the university decided to stop funding the expensive program in 2000.

The Voyageurs remained dormant for 13 years before being brought back in 2013. Once more, there was little to write home about for Laurentian, with just 1 playoff win over the succeeding seven years. As happened to every Canadian college in 2021, Laurentian was forced to cancel its season due to the COVID-19 pandemic, however, the school was impacted far more heavily than other institutions at the time. The strain of the pandemic exacerbated an ongoing financial crisis at the school and in February 2021, Laurentian filed for creditor protection and declared insolvency. During the school's restructuring, several cost-cutting measures were taken that included the firing of dozens of professors as well as cutting 69 academic programs. Additionally, Laurentian was forced to cancel its swimming program as well as both the men's and women's ice hockey teams.

== Season-by-season results ==
1966–67 Laurentian Voyageurs, national runners-up

=== Senior and intermediate play ===
Note: GP = Games played, W = Wins, L = Losses, T = Ties, Pts = Points

Extra-League Champion	U Sports Semifinalist	Conference regular season champions	Conference Division Champions	Conference Playoff Champions

Season	Conference	Regular Season											Conference Tournament Results	National Tournament Results
Season	Conference	Conference						Overall					Conference Tournament Results	National Tournament Results
Season	Conference	GP	W	L	T	Pts*	Finish	GP	W	L	T	%	Conference Tournament Results	National Tournament Results
1962–63	OIAA	?	?	?	?	?	?	?	?	?	?	?	Lost Semifinal, 4–7 (Waterloo Lutheran)	
1963–64	OIAA	?	?	?	?	?	N/A ^{†}	?	?	?	?	?		
Totals								GP	W	L	T	%	Championships	
Regular Season								?	?	?	?	?		
Conference Post-season								?	?	?	?	?		
Regular Season and Postseason Record								?	?	?	?	?		

† season ended early when the league cancelled its remaining schedule in protest.

=== Senior collegiate ===
Note: GP = Games played, W = Wins, L = Losses, T = Ties, OTL = Overtime Losses, SOL = Shootout Losses, Pts = Points

U Sports Champion	U Sports Semifinalist	Conference regular season champions	Conference Division Champions	Conference Playoff Champions

Season	Conference	Regular Season													Conference Tournament Results	National Tournament Results
Season	Conference	Conference								Overall					Conference Tournament Results	National Tournament Results
Season	Conference	GP	W	L	T	OTL	SOL	Pts*	Finish	GP	W	L	T	%	Conference Tournament Results	National Tournament Results
1964–65	OIAA	9	0	0	0	–	–	1.000	T–1st	12	11	1	0	.917	Won Championship, 4–2 (Windsor)	Lost Semifinal, 4–10 (Manitoba); Won Third Place Game, 8–3 (Sir George Williams)
1965–66	OIAA	10	9	0	1	–	–	19	1st	12	9	2	1	.792		Lost Semifinal, 4–10 (Alberta); Lost Third Place Game, 3–5 (St. Francis Xavier)
1966–67	OIAA	11	10	0	1	–	–	21	1st	14	12	1	1	.893		Won Quarterfinal, 4–2 (Sir George Williams); Won Semifinal, 7–2 (Saskatchewan); Lost Championship, 2–16 (Toronto)
1967–68	OIAA	12	10	2	0	–	–	20	1st	14	10	4	0	.714		Lost Semifinal, 2–7 (Alberta); Lost Consolation Final, 3–5 (Toronto)
1968–69	OIAA	10	8	2	0	–	–	16	1st	12	8	4	0	.667		Lost Quarterfinal, 3–6 (Toronto); Lost Consolation Semifinal, 9–10 (Alberta)
1969–70	OIAA	10	5	4	1	–	–	11	2nd	12	6	5	1	.542	Won Semifinal, 8–2 (Waterloo Lutheran); Lost Championship, 2–8 (York)	
1970–71	OIAA	10	10	0	0	–	–	20	1st	14	13	1	0	.929	Won Championship, 5–3 (York)	Won Quarterfinal, 6–3 (Loyola); Lost Semifinal, 2–4 (Saint Mary's); Won Consolation Final, 7–4 (British Columbia)
1971–72	OUAA	18	10	6	2	–	–	22	T–4th	19	10	7	2	.579	Lost Quarterfinal, 1–6 (York)	
1972–73	OUAA	17	11	5	1	–	–	23	3rd	19	12	6	1	.658	Won Quarterfinal, 5–4 (OT) (Queen's); Lost Semifinal, 4–5 (Western Ontario)	
1973–74	OUAA	19	10	6	3	–	–	23	6th	20	10	7	3	.575	Lost Quarterfinal, 2–8 (York)	
1974–75	OUAA	14	8	4	2	–	–	18	6th	15	8	5	2	.600	Lost Quarterfinal, 3–4 (Toronto)	
1975–76	OUAA	16	4	10	2	–	–	10	12th	16	4	10	2	.313		
1976–77	OUAA	20	8	9	3	–	–	19	9th	21	8	10	3	.452	Lost Quarterfinal, 1–4 (Toronto)	
1977–78	OUAA	18	8	10	0	–	–	16	7th	19	8	11	0	.421	Lost Quarterfinal, 1–4 (York)	
1978–79	OUAA	16	8	3	5	–	–	21	4th	?	?	?	?	?	results unavailable	
1979–80	OUAA	22	13	6	3	–	–	29	T–4th	23	13	7	3	.630	Lost Quarterfinal, ? (Guelph)	
1980–81	OUAA	22	6	15	1	–	–	13	9th	22	6	15	1	.750		
1981–82	OUAA	22	9	10	3	–	–	21	8th	22	9	10	3	.477		
1982–83	OUAA	24	11	12	1	–	–	23	T–8th	24	11	12	1	.479		
1983–84	OUAA	24	12	8	4	–	–	28	T–4th	25	12	9	4	.560	Lost Quarterfinal, 1–10 (Guelph)	
1984–85	OUAA	24	14	7	3	–	–	31	4th	25	14	8	3	.620	Lost Quarterfinal, 1–4 (York)	
1985–86	OUAA	24	11	13	0	–	–	22	7th	24	11	13	0	.458		
1986–87	OUAA	24	5	17	2	–	–	.250	13th ^{†}	24	5	17	2	.250		
1987–88	OUAA	26	10	15	1	–	–	21	T–11th	28	10	17	1	.375	Lost Division Semifinal series, 0–2 (Brock)	
1988–89	OUAA	26	3	22	1	–	–	7	15th	26	3	22	1	.135		
1989–90	OUAA	22	3	19	0	–	–	6	15th	22	3	19	0	.136		
1990–91	OUAA	22	9	13	0	–	–	18	11th	23	9	14	0	.391	Lost First Round, 7–4 (Wilfrid Laurier)	
1991–92	OUAA	22	7	14	1	–	–	15	T–12th	22	7	14	1	.341		
1992–93	OUAA	22	7	11	4	–	–	18	12th	23	7	12	4	.391	Lost First Round, 4–10 (Waterloo)	
1993–94	OUAA	26	10	16	0	–	–	20	11th	27	10	17	0	.370	Lost First Round, 3–4 (York)	
1994–95	OUAA	26	8	17	1	–	–	17	13th	27	8	18	1	.315	Lost Division Semifinal, 3–5 (York)	
1995–96	OUAA	26	16	9	1	–	–	33	4th	29	18	10	1	.638	Won Division Final series, 2–0 (Brock); Lost Semifinal, 1–4 (Waterloo)	
1996–97	OUAA	26	14	12	0	–	–	28	9th	29	15	14	0	.517	Won Division Semifinal, 4–2 (Brock); Lost Division Final series, 0–2 (York)	
1997–98	OUA	26	9	16	1	–	–	19	12th	29	10	18	1	.362	Lost Division Semifinal series, 1–2 (Brock)	
1998–99	OUA	26	8	13	5	–	–	21	12th	29	9	15	5	.397	Lost Division Semifinal series, 1–2 (Brock)	
1999–00	OUA	26	9	14	3	–	–	21	T–10th	28	9	16	3	.375	Lost Division Semifinal series, 0–2 (York)	
Program suspended
2013–14	OUA	28	5	22	–	0	1	11	19th	28	5	22	1	.196		
2014–15	OUA	26	14	9	–	3	0	31	7th	29	15	14	0	.517	Lost Division Quarterfinal series, 1–2 (Queen's)	
2015–16	OUA	28	7	15	–	5	1	20	T–16th	30	7	22	1	.250	Lost Division Quarterfinal series, 0–2 (Quebec–Trois-Rivières)	
2016–17	OUA	28	11	12	–	5	0	27	16th	30	11	19	0	.367	Lost Division Quarterfinal series, 1–2 (McGill)	
2017–18	OUA	28	10	17	–	0	1	21	18th	30	10	19	1	.350	Lost Division Quarterfinal series, 0–2 (McGill)	
2018–19	OUA	28	9	18	–	1	0	19	18th	30	9	20	1	.317	Lost Division Quarterfinal series, 0–2 (Ottawa)	
2019–20	OUA	28	5	21	–	1	1	12	20th	28	5	22	1	.196		
2020–21	Season cancelled due to COVID-19 pandemic															
Program suspended
Totals										GP	W	L	T/SOL	%	Championships	
Regular Season										894	373	465	56	.449	6 OIAA Championships, 1 Mid-West Division Title	
Conference Post-season										47	12	35	0	.255	2 OIAA Championships	
U Sports Postseason										14	5	9	0	.357	6 National Tournament appearances	
Regular Season and Postseason Record										955	390	509	56	.438		

Note: Totals include senior collegiate play only except for 1978–79.
† Laurentian was penalized 4 points in the standings for using an ineligible player

== See also ==
- Laurentian Voyageurs women's ice hockey
