= Brock Badgers men's ice hockey =

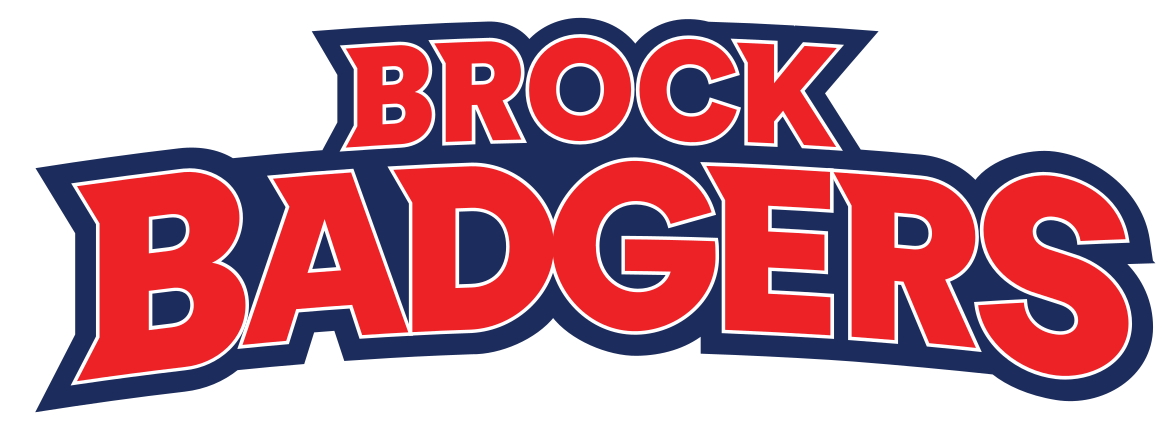
- University: Brock University
- Conference: OUA; OUA West Division
- First season: 1967–68
- Head coach: T. J. Manastersky; Since 2022–23 season
- Assistant coaches: Rob Bentivegna; Ryan Hunter; Ryan Ludzik
- Arena: Canada Games Park; St. Catharines, Ontario
- Colors: red, grey, and black

Conference tournament champions
- 2008, 2018, 2022, 2024

The Brock Badgers men's ice hockey team is an active ice hockey program representing the Brock Badgers athletic department of Brock University. The team has been active since the late 1960s and is currently a member of the Ontario University Athletics conference under the authority of U Sports. The Badgers play at the Canada Games Park in St. Catharines, Ontario.

== Team history ==
=== History ===
Brock founded its ice hockey program in 1967 and joined the Ontario Intercollegiate Athletic Association (OIAA). While the team struggled to win on the ice, the Generals made CIAU history in just their second year. Michael Nicholson was named team captain for the '69 season, becoming the first black player to captain a Canadian college program. In spite of their landmark captain, the team struggled to win for many years. After joining the Ontario University Athletic Association in 1971, the disparity in play only became more stark and Brock went through another five years of futility.

In 1977, after going winless the year before, Brock suddenly produced its first winning season and made their first playoff appearance. Unfortunately, that success was short-lived and the team did not have another winning campaign for 11 years. Once the 1990s rolled around, the Badgers finally found their footing and started looking like they belonged in the conference. While the team found modest success in the early part of the 21st century, it wasn't until 2008 that the Badgers were finally able to make their first appearance in the national tournament.

== Season-by-season results ==
Note: GP = Games played, W = Wins, L = Losses, T = Ties, OTL = Overtime Losses, SOL = Shootout Losses, Pts = Points

U Sports Champion	U Sports Semifinalist	Conference regular season champions	Conference Division Champions	Conference Playoff Champions

Season	Conference	Regular Season													Conference Tournament Results	National Tournament Results
Season	Conference	Conference								Overall					Conference Tournament Results	National Tournament Results
Season	Conference	GP	W	L	T	OTL	SOL	Pts*	Finish	GP	W	L	T	%	Conference Tournament Results	National Tournament Results
Ed Davis (1967–1969)
1967–68	OIAA	12	0	12	0	–	–	0	7th	12	0	12	0	.000		
1968–69	OIAA	10	0	10	0	–	–	0	6th	10	0	10	0	.000		
Al Kellogg (1969–1972)
1969–70	QOAA	10	2	8	0	–	–	4	6th	10	2	8	0	.200		
1970–71	QOAA	10	2	7	1	–	–	5	T–4th	10	2	7	1	.250		
1971–72	OUAA	19	2	17	0	–	–	4	T–13th	19	2	17	0	.105		
Dave Perrin (1972–1973)
1972–73	OUAA	17	2	15	0	–	–	4	13th	17	2	15	0	.118		
John Nickerson (1973–1976)
1973–74	OUAA	17	1	16	0	–	–	2	15th	17	1	16	0	.059		
1974–75	OUAA	17	3	14	0	–	–	6	12th	17	3	14	0	.176		
1975–76	OUAA	12	0	11	1	–	–	1	15th	12	0	11	1	.042		
Lorne Adams (1976–1980)
1976–77	OUAA	15	8	7	0	–	–	16	6th	16	8	8	0	.500	Lost Quarterfinal, 0–9 (Wilfrid Laurier)	
1977–78	OUAA	15	5	7	3	–	–	13	9th	15	5	7	3	.433		
1978–79	OUAA	16	0	14	2	–	–	2	13th	16	0	14	2	.063		
1979–80	OUAA	22	5	16	1	–	–	11	10th	22	5	16	1	.250		
Ron Anderson (1980–1983)
1980–81	OUAA	22	2	16	4	–	–	8	T–11th	22	2	16	4	.182		
1981–82	OUAA	22	2	20	0	–	–	4	11th	22	2	20	0	.091		
1982–83	OUAA	24	7	15	2	–	–	16	10th	24	7	15	2	.333		
Mike Quinn (1983–1984)
1983–84	OUAA	24	7	13	4	–	–	18	T–8th	24	7	13	4	.375		
Paul Jackson (1984–1987)
1984–85	OUAA	24	6	16	2	–	–	14	T–10th	24	6	16	2	.292		
1985–86	OUAA	24	7	16	1	–	–	15	9th	24	7	16	1	.313		
1986–87	OUAA	24	8	15	1	–	–	.354	9th	24	8	15	1	.354		
Mike Pelino (1987–1997)
1987–88	OUAA	26	13	10	3	–	–	29	8th	31	16	12	3	.565	Won Division Semifinal series, 2–0 (Laurentian); Lost Division Final series, 1–2 (Windsor)	
1988–89	OUAA	26	16	9	1	–	–	33	T–4th	32	20	11	1	.641	Won Division Semifinal series, 2–0 (Laurentian); Won Division Final series, 2–1 (Ryerson); Lost Semifinal, 2–5 (Wilfrid Laurier)	
1989–90	OUAA	22	9	11	2	–	–	20	T–9th	22	9	11	2	.455		
1990–91	OUAA	22	6	16	0	–	–	12	13th	22	6	16	0	.273		
1991–92	OUAA	22	7	14	1	–	–	15	T–12th	22	7	14	1	.341		
1992–93	OUAA	22	7	13	2	–	–	16	T–13th	22	7	13	2	.364		
1993–94	OUAA	26	13	12	1	–	–	27	9th	29	14	14	1	.500	Lost Division Final series, 1–2 (York)	
1994–95	OUAA	26	17	8	1	–	–	35	T–3rd	29	18	10	1	.638	Lost Division Final series, 1–2 (York)	
1995–96	OUAA	26	10	14	2	–	–	22	10th	30	12	16	2	.433	Won Division Semifinal, 4–3 (OT) (York); Lost Division Final series, 0–2 (Laurentian)	
1996–97	OUAA	26	8	16	2	–	–	18	12th	27	8	17	2	.333	Lost Division Semifinal, 2–4 (Laurentian)	
Mark French (interim 1997–1998)
1997–98	OUA	26	10	15	1	–	–	21	11th	31	11	19	1	.371	Won Division Semifinal series, 2–1 (mini game) (Laurentian); Lost Division Final series, 0-3 (York)	
Murray Nystrom (1998–2016)
1998–99	OUA	26	10	14	2	–	–	22	11th	32	13	17	2	.419	Won Division Semifinal series, 2–1 (Laurentian); Lost Division Final series, 1-2 (York)	
1999–00	OUA	26	13	10	3	–	–	29	5th	29	14	12	3	.534	Lost Division Final series, 1–2 (York)	
2000–01	OUA	24	11	11	2	–	–	24	T–7th	26	11	13	2	.462	Lost Division Semifinal series, 0–2 (Guelph)	
2001–02	OUA	24	7	13	4	–	–	18	T–11th	29	9	16	4	.379	Won Division Semifinal series, 2–1 (Guelph); Lost Division Final series, 0-2 (York)	
2002–03	OUA	24	8	16	0	–	–	16	11th	26	8	18	0	.308	Lost Division Semifinal series, 0–2 (Wilfrid Laurier)	
2003–04	OUA	24	13	8	3	0	–	29	6th	26	13	10	3	.558	Lost Division Semifinal series, 0–2 (Wilfrid Laurier)	
2004–05	OUA	24	6	16	1	1	–	13	15th	24	6	17	1	.271		
2005–06	OUA	24	9	11	2	2	–	22	9th	27	10	15	2	.407	Lost Division Quarterfinal series, 1–2 (Waterloo)	
2006–07	OUA	28	14	12	1	1	–	30	9th	31	15	15	1	.500	Lost Division Quarterfinal series, 1–2 (Western Ontario)	
2007–08	OUA	28	17	8	–	1	2	37	T–4th	37	21	14	2	.595	Won Division Semifinal series, 2–1 (Western Ontario); Won Division Final series, 2–1 (Lakehead); Lost Queen's Cup, 1–4 (McGill)	Lost Pool A Round-Robin, 1–6 (New Brunswick), 1–4 (Saskatchewan)
2008–09	OUA	28	9	14	–	3	2	23	15th	28	9	17	2	.357		
2009–10	OUA	28	9	17	–	1	1	20	T–16th	28	9	18	1	.339		
2010–11	OUA	28	13	9	–	4	2	32	9th	31	14	15	2	.484	Lost Division Quarterfinal series, 1–2 (Guelph)	
2011–12	OUA	28	13	14	–	1	0	27	17th	32	15	17	0	.469	Won Division Quarterfinal series, 2–0 (Waterloo); Lost Division Semifinal series, 0–2 (Western Ontario)	
2012–13	OUA	28	9	14	–	4	1	23	17th	28	9	18	1	.339		
2013–14	OUA	28	14	10	–	2	2	32	T–10th	31	15	14	2	.516	Lost Division Quarterfinal series, 1–2 (Ryerson)	
2014–15	OUA	27	10	15	–	2	0	22	14th	30	11	19	0	.367	Lost Division Quarterfinal series, 1–2 (Windsor)	
2015–16	OUA	28	6	15	–	6	1	19	18th	28	6	21	1	.232		
Marty Williamson (2016–2021)
2016–17	OUA	28	14	13	–	1	0	29	12th	30	14	16	0	.467	Lost Division Quarterfinal series, 0–2 (Guelph)	
2017–18	OUA	28	14	9	–	3	2	33	T–10th	37	20	15	2	.568	Won Division Quarterfinal series, 2–0 (Wilfrid Laurier); Won Division Semifinal series, 2–0 (Guelph); Won Division Final series, 2–1 (York); Lost Queen's Cup, 1–5 (McGill)	Lost Quarterfinal, 2–6 (St. Francis Xavier)
2018–19	OUA	28	19	5	–	4	0	42	3rd	33	22	11	0	.667	Won Division Quarterfinal series, 2–0 (York); Lost Division Semifinal series, 1–2 (Western Ontario)	
2019–20	OUA	28	14	12	–	2	0	30	10th	32	16	16	0	.500	Won Division Quarterfinal series, 2–0 (Windsor); Lost Division Semifinal series, 0–2 (Guelph)	
2020–21	Season cancelled due to COVID-19 pandemic															
Kevin Forrest (interim 2021–2022)
2021–22	OUA	14	7	5	–	2	0	.571	8th	19	10	9	0	.526	Won Division Quarterfinal, 5–2 (Wilfrid Laurier); Won Division Semifinal, 8–2 (York); Won Division Final, 2–1 (Ryerson); Lost Queen's Cup, 1–3 (Quebec–Trois-Rivières)	Lost Quarterfinal, 0–3 (St. Francis Xavier)
T. J. Manastersky (2022–Present)
2022–23	OUA	27	17	9	–	0	1	35	5th	32	19	12	1	.609	Won Division Quarterfinal series, 2–1 (Wilfrid Laurier); Lost Division Semifinal series, 0–2 (Windsor)	
2023–24	OUA	28	21	7	–	0	0	42	T–3rd	35	24	11	0	.686	Won Division Semifinal series, 2–0 (Windsor); Lost Division Final series, 1–2 (Toronto Metropolitan); Lost Bronze Medal Game, 2–5 (McGill)	Lost Quarterfinal, 0–4 (New Brunswick)
Totals										GP	W	L	T/SOL	%	Championships	
Regular Season										1282	482	730	70	.403	4 Mid West Division Titles, 2 West Division Titles	
Conference Post-season										108	48	60	0	.444		
U Sports Postseason										5	0	5	0	.000	4 National Tournament appearances	
Regular Season and Postseason Record										1395	530	795	70	.405		
