= Trent Excalibur men's ice hockey =

- University: Trent University
- Arena: Peterborough, Ontario
- Colors: Green and White

The Trent Excalibur men's ice hockey team was a varsity ice hockey program that represented Trent University. The team was active for five seasons over a nine-year span in the 1970s. Currently, Trent supports an extramural ice hockey team at an unofficial level.

== History ==
Shortly after the founding of Trent University in 1964, the school began to sponsor ice hockey as a varsity sport. The team began playing in the Ontario Intermediate Athletic Association (OIAA) in 1969. Two years later, amidst a large-scale realignment of conferences in Ontario and Quebec, Trent suspended the program. The team eventually resurfaced in 1975, then as a member of the Ontario University Athletic Association (OUAA). After three relatively unsuccessful seasons, the program was terminated for a second time. As of 2024, Trent has yet to show any intention of restarting the program.

== Season-by-season results ==
Note: GP = Games played, W = Wins, L = Losses, T = Ties, OTL = Overtime Losses, SOL = Shootout Losses, Pts = Points

U Sports Champion	U Sports Semifinalist	Conference regular season champions	Conference Division Champions	Conference Playoff Champions

Season	Conference	Regular Season													Conference Tournament Results	National Tournament Results
Season	Conference	Conference								Overall					Conference Tournament Results	National Tournament Results
Season	Conference	GP	W	L	T	OTL	SOL	Pts*	Finish	GP	W	L	T	%	Conference Tournament Results	National Tournament Results
1969–70	OIAA	10	2	7	1	–	–	5	5th	10	2	7	1	.250		
1970–71	OIAA	10	1	9	0	–	–	2	6th	10	1	9	0	.100		
Program suspended
1975–76	OUAA	12	4	8	0	–	–	8	11th	12	4	8	0	.333		
1976–77	OUAA	15	4	9	2	–	–	10	12th	15	4	9	2	.333		
1977–78	OUAA	16	4	10	2	–	–	10	12th	16	4	10	2	.313		
Program suspended
Totals										GP	W	L	T/SOL	%	Championships	
Regular Season										63	15	43	5	.278		
Conference Post-season										0	0	0	0	–		
U Sports Postseason										0	0	0	0	–		
Regular Season and Postseason Record										63	15	43	5	.278		

Note: Totals include senior collegiate play only.
