= 1989 CIAU University Cup =

Canadian hockey tournament

Tournament details
- Venue(s): Varsity Arena, Toronto, Ontario
- Dates: March 16–18
- Teams: 4

Final positions
- Champions: York Yeomen (3rd title)
- Runners-up: Wilfrid Laurier Golden Hawks

Tournament statistics
- Games played: 3

Awards
- MVP: Mark Applewhaite (York)

The 1989 CIAU Men's University Cup Hockey Tournament (27th annual) was held at the Varsity Arena in Toronto, Ontario. The Toronto Varsity Blues served as tournament host.

== Road to the Cup ==
=== AUAA playoffs ===
Quarterfinals
K1	Acadia	1	3	5
K4	Cape Breton	3	2	3
M2	St. Thomas	4	5	5
M3	Prince Edward Island	6	3	3
M1	Moncton	6	12	—
M4	Mount Allison	3	1	—
K2	Saint Mary’s	4	1	—
K3	Dalhousie	8	4	—

Semifinals
K1	Acadia	3**	4	3
M2	St. Thomas	2	5	4*
M1	Moncton	5	5	8
K3	Dalhousie	4	6	0

Championship
M2	St. Thomas	2	4	—
M1	Moncton	6	8	—

Note: * denotes overtime period(s)

=== OUAA playoffs ===
Division Semifinals
E1	Quebec–Trois-Rivières	6	2	15
E4	Queen's	5	3	1
East
E2	McGill	7	5	—
E3	Concordia	3	3	—
C1	Western Ontario	4	3	—
C4	Wilfrid Laurier	5	5	—
Central
C2	Waterloo	2	5	1
C3	York	3	2	3
W1	Brock	3	3	—
W4	Laurentian	1	2	—
West
W2	Windsor	4	6	0
W3	Ryerson	7	3	1

Division Finals
E1	Quebec–Trois-Rivières	6	6	—
E2	McGill	3	4	—
C4	Wilfrid Laurier	4	7	—
C3	York ^{‡}	3	5	—
W1	Brock	5	4	7
W3	Ryerson	3	5	3

Conference Semifinals
W1	Quebec–Trois-Rivières	4
C3	York	5
C4	Wilfrid Laurier	5
W1	Brock	2

Queen's Cup Final
C3	York	0
C4	Wilfrid Laurier	3

‡ York advanced due to being the defending conference champion.
Note: * denotes overtime period(s)

=== Canada West playoffs ===
Semifinal
1	Alberta	11	5	—
4	Manitoba	4	1	—
2	Calgary	5	3	4
3	Saskatchewan	4	5	3

Championship
1	Alberta	4	2	3
2	Calgary	2	4	1

Note: * denotes overtime period(s)

== University Cup ==
The bracket matches rotated so that the Atlantic entry played the Ontario entry while the Quebec entry played the Western entry in the semifinals. All rounds were single elimination.

Team	Qualification	Record	Appearance	Last
Alberta Golden Bears	West: Canada West Champion	25–8–0	18th	1987
Moncton Aigles Bleus	Atlantic: AUAA Champion	29–4–0	8th	1986
Wilfrid Laurier Golden Hawks	Ontario: OUAA Champion	19–10–3	3rd	1986
York Yeomen	Quebec: OUAA Runner-up	17–13–3	6th	1988

=== Bracket ===
Semifinals; March 16
A	Moncton	4
O	Wilfrid Laurier	8
Q	York	4
W	Alberta	3

Championship; March 18
O	Wilfrid Laurier	2
Q	York	5

Note: * denotes overtime period(s)

== Championship final ==
March 18, 1989	Wilfrid Laurier Golden Hawks	2–5	York Yeomen	Varsity Arena, Toronto, Ontario
