= 1997 CIAU University Cup =

Canadian hockey tournament

Tournament details
- Venue(s): Maple Leaf Gardens & Varsity Arena, Toronto, Ontario
- Dates: March 15–17
- Teams: 4

Final positions
- Champions: Guelph Gryphons (1st title)
- Runners-up: New Brunswick Varsity Reds

Tournament statistics
- Games played: 3

Awards
- MVP: Matt Mullin (Guelph)

The 1997 CIAU Men's University Cup Hockey Tournament (35th annual) was held at the Maple Leaf Gardens and Varsity Arena in Toronto, Ontario. The Toronto Varsity Blues served as tournament host.

== Road to the Cup ==
=== AUAA playoffs ===
Quarterfinals
1	Acadia	7	9	—
4	Saint Mary’s	2	5	—
Kelly Division
2	St. Francis Xavier	3	5	4
3	Dalhousie	8	0	5
1	New Brunswick	7	7	—
4	Moncton	1	1	—
MacAdam Division
2	St. Thomas	7	7	—
3	Prince Edward Island	4	3	—

Semifinals
1	Acadia	4	5	—
3	Dalhousie	3	4	—
1	New Brunswick	8	4	—
2	St. Thomas	5	3	—

Championship
K1	Acadia	4	4	—=—
M1	New Brunswick	5	5	—

Note: * denotes overtime period(s)

=== OUAA playoffs ===
Division Semifinals
FE2	McGill	7
FE3	Ottawa	2
ME2	Toronto	7
ME3	Queen's	3
MW2	Laurentian	4
MW3	Brock	2
FW2	Windsor	2
FW3	Western Ontario	6

Division Finals
FE1	Quebec–Trois-Rivières	3	4	7
FE2	McGill	4	1	6
East
ME1	Guelph	7	4	—
ME2	Toronto	2	3	—
MW1	York	4	9	—
MW2	Laurentian	2	5	—
West
FW1	Waterloo	2	3	—
FW3	Western Ontario	6	5	—

Queen's Cup Semifinals
FE1	Quebec–Trois-Rivières	1
ME1	Guelph	3
MW1	York	5
FW3	Western Ontario	4

Queen's Cup Final
ME1	Guelph	3
MW1	York	0

Note: * denotes overtime period(s)

=== Canada West playoffs ===
Division Semifinal
G2	Manitoba	6	4	—
G3	Regina	3	0	—
M2	Alberta	7	4	7
M3	Lethbridge	1	6	0

Division Final
G1	Saskatchewan	5	3	—
G2	Manitoba	1	1	—
M1	Calgary	4	2	—
M2	Alberta	5	4	—

Championship
G1	Saskatchewan	1	3	—
M2	Alberta	2*	10	—

Note: * denotes overtime period(s)

== University Cup ==
The bracket matches rotated so that the Atlantic entry played the Western entry while the Ontario entry played the Quebec entry in the semifinals. All rounds were single elimination.

The semifinals were held at the Varsity Arena while the championship took place at the Maple Leaf Gardens.

Team	Qualification	Record	Appearance	Last
Alberta Golden Bears	West: Canada West Champion	26–6–1	22nd	1993
Guelph Gryphons	Ontario: OUAA Champion	25–4–1	7th	1995
New Brunswick Varsity Reds	Atlantic: AUAA Champion	25–8–1	4th	1984
York Yeomen	Quebec: OUAA Runner-up	17–10–3	7th	1989

=== Bracket ===
Semifinals; March 15
A	New Brunswick	4
W	Alberta	3
O	Guelph	4
Q	York	2

Championship; March 17
A	New Brunswick	2
O	Guelph	4

Note: * denotes overtime period(s)

== Championship final ==
March 17, 1997	New Brunswick Varsity Reds	2–4	Guelph Gryphons	Maple Leaf Gardens, Toronto, Ontario
