= McGill Redbirds ice hockey =

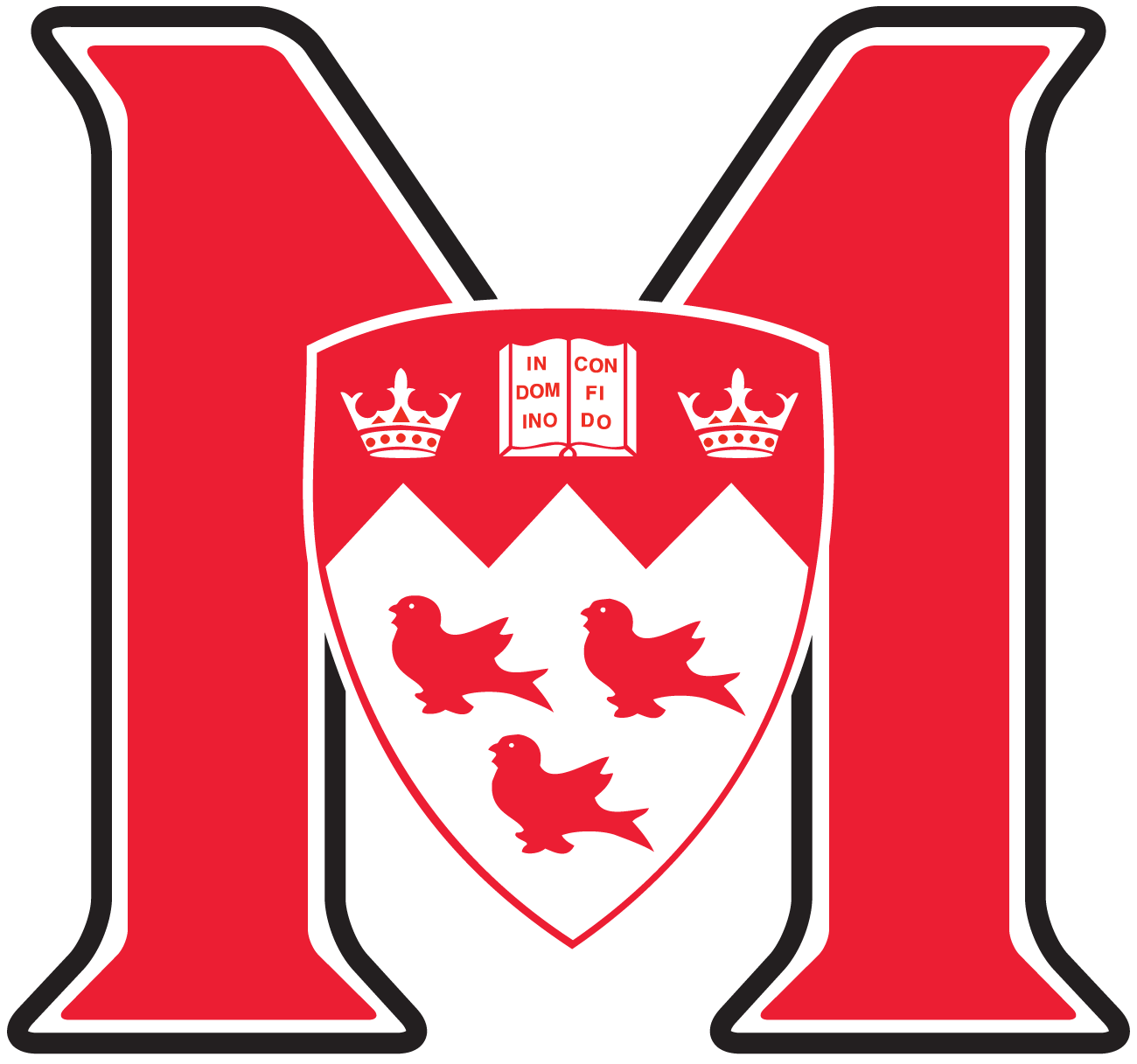
- University: McGill University
- Conference: OUA; OUA East Division
- Head coach: David Urquhart; Since 2021–22 season
- Assistant coaches: Patrick Delisle-Houde; Peter Smith
- Arena: Place Bell; Laval, Quebec
- Colors: Red, White, and Black

U Sports tournament champions
- 2012

U Sports tournament appearances
- 2006, 2008, 2009, 2010, 2011, 2012, 2014, 2017, 2018, 2024

Conference tournament champions
- 2008, 2010, 2011, 2012, 2018

The McGill Redbirds ice hockey team is an ice hockey team representing the McGill Redbirds and Martlets athletics program of McGill University. The team is a member of the Ontario University Athletics conference and compete in U Sports. The Redbirds play their home games at the McConnell Arena in Montreal, Quebec.

== History ==
In 1873, James Creighton, along with several students from McGill, reportedly attempted to play a version of lacrosse on the Victoria Skating Rink. Shortly thereafter, Creighton drew up the first set of rules for "ice hockey". While its unknown if this story is true, what is known is that two years later, Creighton led two contingents of McGill students onto the Victoria Rink for the first indoor ice hockey game in history. The Montreal Gazette was on hand to report on the inaugural match which took place between two 9-man teams. Initially there was some fear for the safety of spectators as previous similar games had shown a tendency for a ball to fly about in a dangerous manner. However, fears were allayed when Creighton announced that a flat, wooden disk would be used instead. The matches were well received by the audience and within a few short years, McGill formed its first official team.

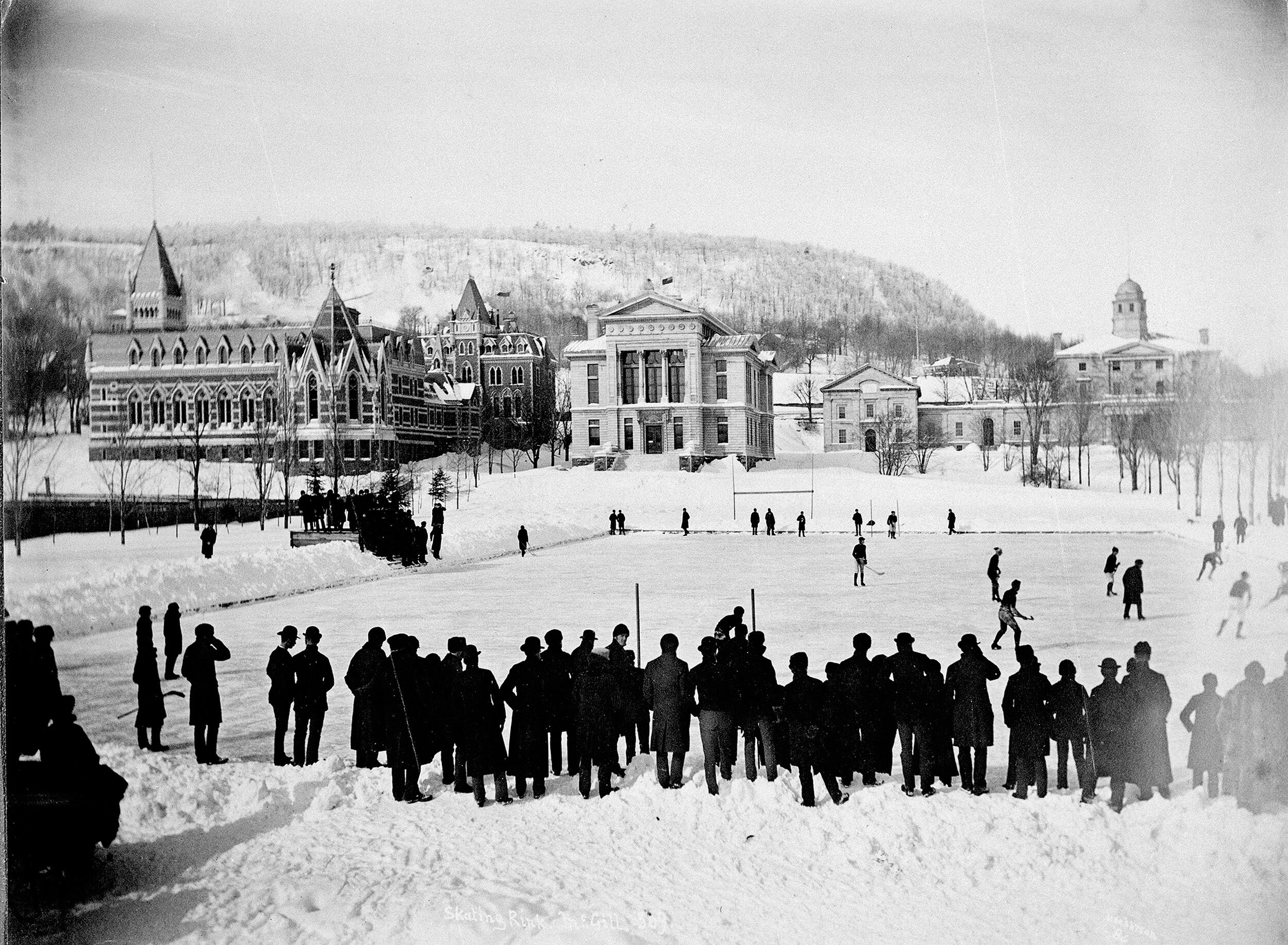
Ice hockey at McGill in 1884

In what is believed to be another ice hockey first for McGill, the 1881 team posed for a team photograph and is the earliest existing image of a squad. Two years later the team met for an ice hockey tournament played at the Montreal Winter Carnival. McGill won the world's first ice hockey championship and received the Winter Carnival Cup, which is on display at the McCord Stewart Museum in Montreal. McGill would continue to participate in the tournament until the Carnival's discontinuation in 1889.

1886 saw the first official ice hockey league formed when five teams from Montreal (including McGill) joined to start the Canadian Amateur Hockey Association (CAHA). By the mid-1890s, ice hockey was beginning to spread south of the border and a barnstorming troupe of American college students from various universities took a trip through Canada. The first international ice hockey game took place on February 23, 1894 and saw McGill defeat the American squad 14–1.

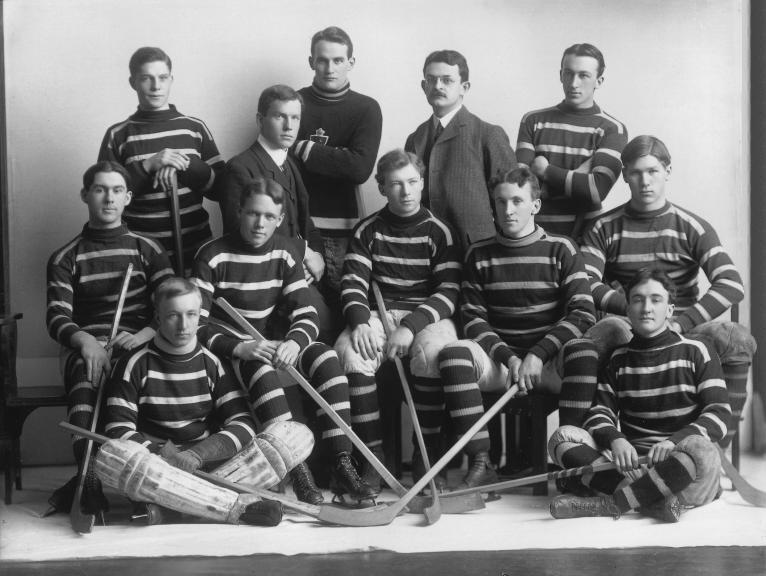
McGill team of 1904

Just after the start of the 20th century, McGill partnered with Queen's and Toronto to create the first collegiate conference in Canada. From then until the mid 1950's, McGill would play both college- and senior-level ice hockey, winning several championships along the way. In 1954, however, most Canadian schools switched entirely to college matches and McGill became an inaugural member of the Quebec-Ontario Athletic Association (QOAA). The team continued on with the conference until 1971 when the leagues were realigned along provincial borders and McGill joined the newly-created Quebec Universities Athletic Association. The league remained in place for the better part of two decades but, by the end of the 1980s, league membership had fallen to just four schools. In 1987, McGill, along with the other surviving programs, joined the Ontario Universities Athletics Association and have been an associate member ever since.

The upheaval during those years did not help McGill and the once lofty program had fallen on hard times. However, by the mid-90s, McGill began to recover its former strength and started posting good records. Postseason success eluded the Redmen until the 21st century and the team won its first conference championship in 2008. Several more titles followed and McGill was eventually able to capture a national championship in 2012.

=== Moniker ===
Beginning in 1927, the McGill athletic teams were known as the 'Redmen'. While this was initially intended as a reference to the hair color of the school's founder, James McGill, the allusions to native peoples were unavoidable. Unofficially, the team was referred to as the 'Indians' during the 1950s and 60s while native iconography was included on jerseys up until it was forcibly removed in 1992. Despite the change in imagery, the name remained until a referendum by the student body overwhelmingly supported a change in the nickname. The athletic department went without an official moniker for its men's teams from April 2019 to November 2020 when 'Redbirds' was announced as the program's new name.

== Season-by-season results ==
=== Senior and collegiate play ===
Note: GP = Games played, W = Wins, L = Losses, T = Ties, Pts = Points

Extra-League Champion	U Sports Semifinalist	Conference regular season champions	Conference Division Champions	Conference Playoff Champions

Season	Conference	Regular Season											Conference Tournament Results	National Tournament Results
Season	Conference	Conference						Overall					Conference Tournament Results	National Tournament Results
Season	Conference	GP	W	L	T	Pts*	Finish	GP	W	L	T	%	Conference Tournament Results	National Tournament Results
Senior and Collegiate Hockey
1902–03	CIAU	4	2	1	1	5	1st	?	?	?	?	?		
1903–04	CIAU	4	1	3	0	2	3rd	?	?	?	?	?		
1904–05	CIAU	4	3	1	0	6	1st	?	?	?	?	?		
1905–06	CIAU	4	2	2	0	4	2nd	?	?	?	?	?		
1906–07	CIAU	4	2	2	0	4	2nd	?	?	?	?	?		
1907–08	CIAU	6	1	5	0	2	4th	?	?	?	?	?		
1908–09	CIAU	6	2	4	0	4	3rd	?	?	?	?	?		
Harry Trihey (1909–1910)
1909–10	CIAU	6	4	2	0	8	T–1st	?	?	?	?	?	Won Semifinal, forfeit (Toronto); Lost Championship, 8–2 (Queen's)	
Art Ross (1910–1911)
1910–11	CIAU	4	1	3	0	2	3rd	?	?	?	?	?		
Laurie Roberts (1911–1914)
1911–12	CIAU	4	4	0	0	8	1st	?	?	?	?	?	Won Championship series, 25–5 (Ottawa)	
1912–13	CIAU	4	2	2	0	4	2nd	?	?	?	?	?		
1913–14	CIAU	4	1	3	0	2	3rd	?	?	?	?	?		
no coach (1914–1916)
1914–15	CIAU	4	1	3	0	2	T–2nd	?	?	?	?	?		
1914–15	MCHL	10	2	7	1	5	5th	?	?	?	?	?		
1915–16	MCHL	10	1	7	2	4	5th	?	?	?	?	?		
F. L. Poulin (1916–1917)
1916–17	MCHL	10	6	3	1	13	2nd	?	?	?	?	?		
Vincent P. Heney (1917–1918)
1917–18	MCHL	10	7	1	2	16	T–1st	?	?	?	?	?	Won Championship, 14–1 (Loyola)	Lost Art Ross Cup Challenge, 3–7 (Montreal Hochelaga)
Harry Hyland (1918–1919)
1918–19	MCHL	10	5	3	1	11	2nd	?	?	?	?	?		
Frank Shaughnessy (1919–1927)
1919–20	CIAU	4	3	1	0	6	T–1st	?	?	?	?	?	Lost Championship series, 4–5 (Toronto)	
1919–20	MCHL	7	5	2	0	10	T–1st	?	?	?	?	?	Lost Semifinal, 4–5 (Montreal AAA)	
1920–21	CIAU	4	2	2	0	4	2nd	?	?	?	?	?		Won Quebec Senior League Semifinal, 6–4 (La Tuque); Won Quebec Senior League Championship, 4–2 (Quebec Royal Rifles)
1920–21	MCHL	7	4	3	0	8	4th	?	?	?	?	?	Won Semifinal, 7–5 (Montreal Shamrocks); Won Championship, 6–3 (Montreal Le National)	Lost Allan Cup East Final, 0–11 (Toronto)
1921–22	CIAU	4	2	2	0	4	2nd	?	?	?	?	?		
1922–23	CIAU	6	2	4	0	4	3rd	?	?	?	?	?		
1923–24	CIAU	6	2	3	1	5	3rd	?	?	?	?	?		
1923–24	MCHL	7	5	2	0	10	2nd	?	?	?	?	?		
1924–25	CIAU	6	1	5	0	2	4th	?	?	?	?	?		
1925–26	CIAU	6	1	5	0	2	4th	?	?	?	?	?		
1926–27	CIAU	6	5	1	0	10	T–1st	?	?	?	?	?		
1926–27	SG	10	2	8	0	10	4th	?	?	?	?	?		
Wallace Whitehead (1927–1928)
1927–28	CIAU	4	2	2	0	4	2nd	?	?	?	?	?		
1927–28	MSG	9	4	5	0	8	3rd	?	?	?	?	?		
Vincent P. Heney (1928–1930)
1928–29	CIAU	0	0	0	0	0	–	?	?	?	?	?	Lost Championship series, 3–9 (Toronto)	
1928–29	MSG	8	3	4	1	7	4th	?	?	?	?	?		
Walter Smaill (1929–1930)
1929–30	CIAU	0	0	0	0	0	–	?	?	?	?	?	Won Championship series, 3–2 (Toronto)	
1929–30	MSG	10	3	7	0	6	5th	?	?	?	?	?		
Bobby Bell (1930–1937)
1930–31	CIAU	0	0	0	0	0	–	?	?	?	?	?	Won Championship series, 6–4 (Toronto)	Won Senior Final series, 4–3 (Montreal St Francois Xavier)
1930–31	MSG	12	6	2	4	16	T–1st	?	?	?	?	?	Won Semifinal series, 10–3 (Montreal Columbus Club); Won Championship series, 17–6 (Montreal AAA)	Lost Allan Cup East Semifinal series, 4–5 (Truro Bearcats)
1931–32	CIAU	0	0	0	0	0	–	?	?	?	?	?	Lost Championship series, 3–4 (Toronto)	
1931–32	MSG	12	8	1	3	19	1st	?	?	?	?	?	Lost Championship series, 3–4 (Montreal AAA)	
1932–33	CIAU	4	3	0	1	7	1st	?	?	?	?	?		
1932–33	MSG	12	7	4	1	15	T–1st	?	?	?	?	?	Tied First Place playoff, 0–0 (Montreal Canadiens); Lost Championship series, 2–3 (Montreal Royals)	
1933–34	CIAU	0	0	0	0	0	–	?	?	?	?	?	Won Championship series, 9–4 (Toronto)	Won Senior Final series, 11–1 (Quebec Aces)
1933–34	MSG	12	10	0	2	33	1st	?	?	?	?	?	Won Semifinal series, 7–5 (Verdun Maple Leafs); Won Championship series, 2–1 (Montreal Canadiens)	Lost Allan Cup East Semifinal series, 2–6 (Moncton Hawks)
1934–35	CIAU	4	4	0	0	8	1st	?	?	?	?	?		
1934–35	MSG	12	7	4	1	30	2nd	?	?	?	?	?	Lost Semifinal series, 1–2 (Ottawa Senators)	
1935–36	CIAU	0	0	0	0	0	–	?	?	?	?	?	Won Championship series, 15–3 (Toronto)	
1935–36	MSG	14	8	5	1	31	3rd	?	?	?	?	?	Lost Semifinal series, 1–2 (Verdun Maple Leafs)	
1936–37	CIAU	6	6	0	0	12	1st	?	?	?	?	?		
1936–37	IIL ^{†}	10	10	0	0	20	1st	?	?	?	?	?		
1936–37	MSG	16	12	2	2	38	T–1st	?	?	?	?	?	Lost Semifinal series, 1–2 (Quebec Aces)	
Hugh Farquharson (1937–1942)
1937–38	CIAU	6	5	1	0	10	1st	?	?	?	?	?		
1937–38	IIL	10	9	1	0	18	1st	?	?	?	?	?		
1937–38	QSHL	12	4	7	1	18	7th	?	?	?	?	?		
1938–39	CIAU	6	5	1	0	10	1st	?	?	?	?	?		
1938–39	IIL	10	9	1	0	18	1st	?	?	?	?	?		
1938–39	QSHL	12	4	6	2	20	5th	?	?	?	?	?		
1939–40	CIAU	4	2	2	0	4	2nd	?	?	?	?	?		
1939–40	IIL	8	6	2	0	12	2nd	?	?	?	?	?		
1940–41	Independent	–	–	–	–	–	–	?	?	?	?	?		
1941–42	Independent	–	–	–	–	–	–	?	?	?	?	?		
Bobby Bell (1942–1943)
1942–43	Independent	–	–	–	–	–	–	?	?	?	?	?		
Lorne White (1943–1944)
1943–44	Independent	–	–	–	–	–	–	?	?	?	?	?		
Bobby Bell (1944–1945)
1944–45	Independent	–	–	–	–	–	–	?	?	?	?	?		
Dave Campbell (1945–1951)
1945–46	CIAU	6	5	1	0	10	T–1st	?	?	?	?	?	Won Championship, 4–1 (Toronto)	
1946–47	CIAU	9	6	2	1	13	T–1st	?	?	?	?	?	Lost Championship, 0–4 (Toronto)	
1947–48	CIAU	12	9	3	0	18	2nd	?	?	?	?	?		
1948–49	CIAU	12	6	6	0	12	3rd	?	?	?	?	?		
1949–50	CIAU	12	3	9	0	6	3rd	?	?	?	?	?		
1950–51	CIAU	6	2	3	1	5	3rd	?	?	?	?	?		
Rocky Robillard (1951–1958)
1951–52	CIAU	12	1	10	1	3	4th	?	?	?	?	?		
1952–53	CIAU	12	4	5	3	11	3rd	?	?	?	?	?		
1953–54	CIAU/QOAA ^{¿}	12	3	9	0	6	4th	?	?	?	?	?		
Totals								GP	W	L	T	%	Championships	
Regular Season								?	?	?	?	?	13 CIAU Championships, 3 IIL Championships, 1 MCHL Championship, 5 MSG Championships	
Conference Post-season								?	?	?	?	?	8 CIAU Championships, 1 MCHL Championship, 3 MSG Championships	
Regular Season and Postseason Record								?	?	?	?	?	1 Quebec Senior League Championship, 2 Quebec Senior Championships	

† The International Intercollegiate League (IIL) was a joint venture between Canadian and American colleges.
¿ Sometime between 1953 and 1955 the CIAU changed their name to QOAA (Quebec-Ontario Athletic Association).

=== Collegiate only ===
Note: GP = Games played, W = Wins, L = Losses, T = Ties, OTL = Overtime Losses, SOL = Shootout Losses, Pts = Points

U Sports Champion	U Sports Semifinalist	Conference regular season champions	Conference Division Champions	Conference Playoff Champions

Season	Conference	Regular Season													Conference Tournament Results	National Tournament Results
Season	Conference	Conference								Overall					Conference Tournament Results	National Tournament Results
Season	Conference	GP	W	L	T	OTL	SOL	Pts*	Finish	GP	W	L	T	%	Conference Tournament Results	National Tournament Results
Rocky Robillard (1951–1958)
1954–55	QOAA	12	6	6	0	–	–	12	2nd	12	6	6	0	.500		
1955–56	QOAA	12	4	8	0	–	–	8	T–3rd	12	4	8	0	.333		
1956–57	QOAA	12	7	5	0	–	–	14	2nd	12	7	5	0	.583		
1957–58	QOAA	12	4	8	0	–	–	8	4th	12	4	8	0	.333		
Ken Murray (1958–1961)
1958–59	QOAA	12	0	11	1	–	–	1	4th	12	0	11	1	.042		
1959–60	QOAA	14	3	9	2	–	–	8	4th	14	3	9	2	.286		
1960–61	QOAA	12	2	10	0	–	–	4	4th	12	2	10	0	.167		
Kelly Burnett (1961–1964)
1961–62	QOAA	11	6	5	0	–	–	12	3rd	11	6	5	0	.545		
1962–63	QOAA	12	5	6	1	–	–	11	4th	12	5	6	1	.458		
1963–64	QOAA	12	4	4	4	–	–	13	T–4th	12	4	4	4	.500		
Dave Copp (1964–1968)
1964–65	QOAA	16	3	12	1	–	–	7	T–7th	16	3	12	1	.219		
1965–66	QOAA	16	4	11	1	–	–	9	8th	16	4	11	1	.281		
1966–67	QOAA	16	4	11	1	–	–	9	8th	16	4	11	1	.281		
1967–68	QOAA	16	2	14	0	–	–	4	9th	16	2	14	0	.125		
Brian Gilmour (1968–1971)
1968–69	QOAA	15	5	9	1	–	–	11	8th	15	5	9	1	.367		
1969–70	QOAA	15	5	7	3	–	–	13	T–8th	15	5	7	3	.433		
1970–71	QOAA	15	5	8	2	–	–	12	T–7th	15	5	8	2	.400		
Dave Dies (1971–1972)
1971–72	QUAA	21	1	20	0	–	–	2	8th	21	1	20	0	.048		
Herb Madill (1972–1979)
1972–73	QUAA	24	7	15	2	–	–	16	6th	24	7	15	2	.333		
1973–74	QUAA	18	6	10	2	–	–	14	5th	18	6	10	2	.389		
1974–75	QUAA	20	7	11	2	–	–	16	4th	21	7	12	2	.381	Lost Semifinal, 1–9 (Loyola)	
1975–76	QUAA	20	3	14	3	–	–	9	5th	20	3	14	3	.225		
1976–77	QUAA	20	3	13	4	–	–	10	T–5th	20	3	13	4	.250		
1977–78	QUAA	16	9	5	2	–	–	20	3rd	18	9	7	2	.556	Lost Semifinal series, 0–2 (Quebec–Trois-Rivières)	
1978–79	QUAA	20	9	9	2	–	–	20	4th	22	9	11	2	.455	Lost Semifinal series, 0–2 (Concordia)	
Ken Tyler (1979–1988)
1979–80	QUAA	24	3	21	0	–	–	6	7th	24	3	21	0	.125		
1980–81	QUAA	24	5	15	4	–	–	14	5th	24	5	15	4	.292		
1981–82	QUAA	24	9	15	0	–	–	18	5th	24	9	15	0	.375		
1982–83	QUAA	30	11	19	0	–	–	22	T–5th	30	11	19	0	.367		
1983–84	QUAA	24	9	10	5	–	–	23	T–2nd	28	10	13	5	.446	Lost Semifinal series, 1–3 (Ottawa)	
1984–85	QUAA	19	8	10	1	–	–	17	4th	21	8	12	1	.405	Lost Semifinal series, 0–2 (Quebec–Chicoutimi)	
1985–86	QUAA	20	9	10	1	–	–	19	3rd	23	10	12	1	.457	Lost Semifinal series, 1–2 (Ottawa)	
1986–87	QUAA	18	4	12	2	–	–	.278	3rd	25	6	17	2	.280	Won Semifinal series, 2–1 (Ottawa); Lost Championship series, 0–4 (Quebec–Trois-Rivières)	
1987–88	OUAA	25	13	8	4	–	–	30	T–6th	31	16	11	4	.581	Won Division Semifinal series, 2–1 (Concordia); Lost Division Final series, 1–2 (Quebec–Trois-Rivières)	
Al Grazys (1988–1990) / Jean Pronovost (1988–1994)
1988–89	OUAA	26	19	4	3	–	–	41	3rd	30	21	6	3	.750	Won Division Semifinal series, 2–0 (Concordia); Lost Division Final series, 0–2 (Quebec–Trois-Rivières)	
1989–90	OUAA	22	12	8	2	–	–	26	6th	24	12	10	2	.542	Lost Quarterfinal series, 0–2 (Quebec–Trois-Rivières)	
1990–91	OUAA	22	12	7	3	–	–	29	T–6th	25	13	9	3	.580	Won First Round, 5–4 (York); Lost Quarterfinal series, 0–2 (Quebec–Trois-Rivières)	
1991–92	OUAA	22	15	5	2	–	–	32	T–3rd	25	16	7	2	.680	Lost Quarterfinal series, 1–2 (Toronto)	
1992–93	OUAA	22	11	8	3	–	–	25	8th	25	12	10	3	.540	Won First Round, 3–2 (Concordia); Lost Quarterfinal series, 0–2 (Ottawa)	
1993–94	OUAA	24	13	10	1	–	–	15	T–7th	24	13	10	1	.563		
Jamie Kompon / Martin Raymond (1994–1995)
1994–95	OUAA	24	13	10	1	–	–	27	7th	28	15	12	1	.554	Won Division Semifinal, 3–1 (Concordia); Lost Division Final series, 1–2 (Quebec–Trois-Rivières)	
Terry Bangen (1995–1996)
1995–96	OUAA	26	15	9	2	–	–	32	T–5th	27	15	10	2	.615	Lost Division Semifinal, 3–5 (Ottawa)	
Martin Raymond (1996–2009)
1996–97	OUAA	26	14	10	2	–	–	30	T–6th	30	16	12	2	.567	Won Division Semifinal, 7–2 (Ottawa); Lost Division Final series, 1–2 (Quebec–Trois-Rivières)	
1997–98	OUA	26	12	10	4	–	–	28	T–6th	29	13	12	4	.517	Lost Division Semifinal series, 1–2 (Concordia)	
1998–99	OUA	26	13	9	4	–	–	16	6th	26	13	9	4	.577		
1999–00	OUA	26	21	5	0	–	–	42	T–2nd	31	24	7	0	.774	Won Division Semifinal series, 2–0 (Concordia); Lost Division Final series, 1–2 (Quebec–Trois-Rivières)	
2000–01	OUA	24	10	11	3	–	–	23	9th	26	10	13	3	.442	Lost Division Semifinal series, 0–2 (Concordia)	
2001–02	OUA	24	13	9	2	–	–	28	7th	26	13	11	2	.538	Lost Division Semifinal series, 0–2 (Quebec–Trois-Rivières)	
2002–03	OUA	24	16	6	2	–	–	34	6th	26	16	8	2	.654	Lost Division Semifinal series, 0–2 (Ottawa)	
2003–04	OUA	24	9	9	4	2	–	24	9th	24	9	11	4	.458		
2004–05	OUA	24	17	6	1	0	–	35	T–1st	29	20	8	1	.707	Won Division Semifinal series, 2–0 (Ottawa); Lost Division Final series, 1–2 (Quebec–Trois-Rivières)	
2005–06	OUA	24	20	1	3	0	–	43	1st	32	25	4	3	.828	Won Division Semifinal series, 2–1 (Ottawa); Won Division Final series, 2–0 (Quebec–Trois-Rivières); Lost Queen's Cup Final series, 1–2 (Lakehead)	Lost Pool A Round-Robin, 4–3 (Wilfrid Laurier), 1–5 (Alberta)
2006–07	OUA	28	15	7	5	1	–	36	6th	33	17	11	5	.591	Won Division Quarterfinal series, 2–1 (Concordia); Lost Division Semifinal series, 0–2 (Toronto)	
2007–08	OUA	28	18	9	–	0	1	39	T–4th	37	26	10	1	.716	Won Division Quarterfinal series, 2–0 (Carleton); Won Division Semifinal series, 2–0 (Queen's); Won Division Final series, 2–0 (Quebec–Trois-Rivières); Won Queen's Cup, 4–1 (Brock)	Lost Pool 2 Round-Robin, 1–7 (Alberta), 3–0 (Moncton)
2008–09	OUA	28	18	8	–	1	1	38	T–6th	37	25	11	1	.689	Won Division Quarterfinal series, 2–0 (Ottawa); Won Division Semifinal series, 2–0 (Toronto); Won Division Final series, 2–0 (Quebec–Trois-Rivières); Lost Queen's Cup, 4–1 (Western Ontario)	Lost Pool B Round-Robin, 1–4 (Saint Mary's), 4–3 (Western Ontario)
Jim Webster (2009–2010)
2009–10	OUA	28	22	6	–	0	0	44	2nd	38	29	9	0	.763	Won Division Quarterfinal series, 2–0 (Nipissing); Won Division Semifinal series, 2–1 (Carleton); Won Division Final series, 2–0 (Quebec–Trois-Rivières); Won Queen's Cup, 3–1 (Lakehead)	Lost Pool A Round-Robin, 4–5 (OT) (Manitoba), 2–4 (Saint Mary's)
Kelly Nobes (2010–2019)
2010–11	OUA	28	24	2	–	0	2	50	1st	39	33	4	2	.872	Won Division Quarterfinal series, 2–0 (Ottawa); Won Division Semifinal series, 2–0 (Nipissing); Won Division Final series, 2–1 (Quebec–Trois-Rivières); Won Queen's Cup, 6–2 (Western Ontario)	Won Pool A Round-Robin, 2–1 (St. Francis Xavier), 6–3 (Alberta); Lost Championship, 0–4 (New Brunswick)
2011–12	OUA	28	22	4	–	2	0	46	1st	38	31	7	0	.816	Won Division Quarterfinal series, 2–0 (Queen's); Won Division Semifinal series, 2–0 (Ottawa); Won Division Final series, 2–0 (Quebec–Trois-Rivières); Won Queen's Cup, 4–1 (Western Ontario)	Won Pool A Round-Robin, 6–3 (Moncton), 3–4 (Saskatchewan); Won Championship, 4–3 (OT) (Western Ontario)
2012–13	OUA	28	17	7	–	0	4	38	T–2nd	31	18	9	4	.645	Lost Division Quarterfinal series, 1–2 (Nipissing)	
2013–14	OUA	28	21	5	–	1	1	44	T–2nd	38	28	9	1	.750	Won Division Quarterfinal series, 2–0 (Concordia); Won Division Semifinal series, 2–0 (Quebec–Trois-Rivières); Won Division Final series, 2–1 (Carleton); Lost Queen's Cup, 2–3 (Windsor)	Lost Pool A Round-Robin, 3–2 (Carleton), 2–3 (2OT) (Alberta)
2014–15	OUA	26	21	5	–	0	0	42	2nd	34	25	9	0	.735	Won Division Quarterfinal series, 2–1 (Concordia); Won Division Semifinal series, 2–0 (Queen's); Lost Division Final series, 0–2 (Quebec–Trois-Rivières); Lost Bronze Medal Game, 1–2 (OT) (Windsor)	
2015–16	OUA	28	21	6	–	1	0	43	2nd	32	23	9	0	.719	Won Division Quarterfinal series, 2–0 (Concordia); Lost Division Semifinal series, 0–2 (Carleton)	
2016–17	OUA	28	21	4	–	2	1	45	2nd	36	26	9	1	.736	Won Division Quarterfinal series, 2–0 (Laurentian); Won Division Semifinal series, 2–0 (Quebec–Trois-Rivières); Lost Division Final series, 0–2 (Queen's); Won Bronze Medal Game, 6–3 (Windsor)	Lost Quarterfinal, 1–4 (St. Francis Xavier)
2017–18	OUA	28	22	4	–	1	1	46	1st	38	29	8	1	.776	Won Division Quarterfinal series, 2–0 (Laurentian); Won Division Semifinal series, 2–1 (Ottawa); Won Division Final series, 2–1 (Concordia); Won Queen's Cup, 5–1 (Brock)	Lost Quarterfinal, 1–4 (Saskatchewan)
2018–19	OUA	28	17	7	–	3	1	38	5th	33	20	12	1	.621	Won Division Quarterfinal series, 2–0 (Concordia); Lost Division Semifinal series, 1–2 (Carleton)	
Liam Heelis (2019–2021)
2019–20	OUA	28	16	10	–	2	0	34	7th	31	17	14	0	.548	Lost Division Semifinal series, 1–2 (Concordia)	
2020–21	Season cancelled due to COVID-19 pandemic															
David Urquhart (2021–Present)
2021–22	OUA	17	6	11	–	0	0	.353	17th	21	8	13	0	.381	Won Division Quarterfinal, 3–2 (OT) (Queen's); Won Division Semifinal, 3–1 (Nipissing); Lost Division Final, 0–1 (Quebec–Trois-Rivières); Lost Bronze Medal Game, 1–2 (Ryerson)	
2022–23	OUA	26	14	8	–	3	1	32	7th	30	16	13	1	.550	Won Division Quarterfinal series, 2–0 (Ottawa); Lost Division Semifinal series, 0–2 (Concordia)	
2023–24	OUA	28	21	5	–	1	1	44	1st	37	27	9	1	.743	Won Division Semifinal series, 2–0 (Concordia); Lost Division Final series, 1–2 (Quebec–Trois-Rivières); Won Bronze Medal Game, 5–2 (Brock)	Won Quarterfinal, 3–2 (British Columbia); Lost Semifinal, 4–5 (Quebec–Trois-Rivières); Won Bronze Medal Game, 5–2 (Toronto Metropolitan)
Totals										GP	W	L	T/SOL	%	Championships	
Regular Season										1494	756	626	112	.544	2 Far East Division Titles, 6 East Division Titles, 6 OUA Championships	
Conference Post-season										179	100	79	0	.559	5 OUA Championships	
U Sports Postseason										21	10	11	0	.476	10 National tournament appearances	
Regular Season and Postseason Record										1694	866	716	112	.544	1 National Championship	

Note: Totals include results from 1954–55 onward.

== See also ==
McGill Martlets ice hockey
