= 1988 CIAU University Cup =

Canadian hockey tournament

Tournament details
- Venue(s): Varsity Arena, Toronto, Ontario
- Dates: March 18–20
- Teams: 4

Final positions
- Champions: York Yeomen (2nd title)
- Runners-up: Western Ontario Mustangs

Tournament statistics
- Games played: 3

Awards
- MVP: Brian Gray (York)

The 1988 CIAU Men's University Cup Hockey Tournament (26th annual) was held at the Varsity Arena in Toronto, Ontario. The Toronto Varsity Blues served as tournament host.

== Road to the Cup ==
=== AUAA playoffs ===
Semifinals
K1	St. Francis Xavier	1	4	2
M2	Moncton	4	1	3**
M1	Prince Edward Island	?	6	5
K2	Acadia	?	3	2

Championship
M2	Moncton	2	0	—
M1	Prince Edward Island	3*	5	—

Note: * denotes overtime period(s)

=== OUAA playoffs ===
Division Semifinals
E1	Quebec–Trois-Rivières	6	12	—
E4	Ottawa	2	2	—
East
E2	McGill	9	4	8
E3	Concordia	6	7	5
C1	York	8	6	—
C4	Wilfrid Laurier	2	5	—
Central
C2	Western Ontario	5	7	—
C3	Waterloo	3	3	—
W1	Windsor	9	8	—
W4	Ryerson	2	4	—
West
W2	Brock	5	7	—
W3	Laurentian	3	3	—

Division Finals
E1	Quebec–Trois-Rivières	2	4	4
E2	McGill	1	5	2
C1	York	3	5	—
C2	Western Ontario ^{‡}	2	4	—
W1	Windsor	5	4	7
W2	Brock	3	5	3

Conference Semifinals
W1	Quebec–Trois-Rivières	2
C2	Western Ontario	3
C1	York	5
W1	Windsor	2

Queen's Cup Final
C2	Western Ontario	1
C1	York	5

‡ Western Ontario advanced due to having the most regular season points of the Division Final losers.
Note: * denotes overtime period(s)

=== Canada West playoffs ===
Semifinal
1	Calgary	5	?	5
4	Manitoba	4	?	4
2	Alberta	?	5	6
3	Saskatchewan	?	3	2

Championship
1	Calgary	3	7	8
2	Alberta	6	4	6

Note: * denotes overtime period(s)

== University Cup ==
Due to the collapse of the QUAA's ice hockey division, only three conferences were playing senior college hockey. The selection committee set a new policy by making four regional spots available for tournament play: Atlantic, Ontario, Quebec and West. Because the OUAA possessed more teams than the other two conferences combined, and was the only one that possessed teams from Quebec, the OUAA champion and runner-up would split the Ontario and Quebec bids. Part of this arrangement was the elimination of the automatic bid for the host team. This was made possible by Toronto accepting the responsibilities of hosting the tournament for ten years.

The bracket was arranged so that the Atlantic entry played the Quebec entry while the Ontario entry played the Western entry in the semifinals. All rounds were single elimination.

Team	Qualification	Record	Appearance	Last
Calgary Dinos	West: Canada West Champion	27–6–0	6th	1986
Prince Edward Island Panthers	Atlantic: AUAA Champion	24–3–2	3rd	1987
Western Ontario Mustangs	Quebec: OUAA Runner-up	20–7–5	2nd	1987
York Yeomen	Ontario: OUAA Champion	26–1–5	5th	1987

=== Bracket ===
Semifinals; March 18–19
A	Prince Edward Island	1
Q	Western Ontario	3
O	York	4
W	Calgary	3

Championship; March 20
Q	Western Ontario	3
O	York	5

Note: * denotes overtime period(s)

== Championship final ==
March 20, 1988	Western Ontario Mustangs	3–5	York Yeomen	Varsity Arena, Toronto, Ontario
