= York Lions men's ice hockey =

Canadian university ice hockey team

- University: York University
- Conference: OUA; OUA East Division
- Head coach: Russ Herrington; Since 2017–18 season
- Assistant coaches: Dan Poliziani; Jessica Turi; Stefano Mallocci
- Arena: NFP Athletic Centre; Toronto, Ontario
- Colors: Red, White, and Black

U Sports tournament champions
- 1985, 1988, 1989

U Sports tournament appearances
- 1970, 1985, 1986, 1987, 1988, 1989, 1997, 1999, 2003, 2004, 2017

Conference tournament champions
- 1970, 1985, 1986, 1987, 1988, 2004, 2017

Conference regular season champions
- 1970, 1972, 1977, 1988

The York Lions men's ice hockey team (formerly the York Yeomen) is an active ice hockey program representing the York Lions athletic department of York University. The team has been continually active since the early 1960s and is currently a member of the Ontario University Athletics conference under the authority of U Sports. The Lions play their home games at the NFP Athletic Centre in Toronto, Ontario.

== History ==
York University, established in 1959, iced its first varsity hockey team in 1962, joining the Ontario Intermediate Athletic Association (OIAA), as an Intermediate (2nd tier) program. The Yeomen joined just as the league was preparing to elevate itself to the senior level of Canadian college hockey, however, its plans hit a snag. The OIAA petitioned CIAU for a bid into the University Cup in 1964 but were denied. In response, the entire league cancelled their schedules midway through the year. That summer, the CIAU reversed their decision and conferred an automatic bid for the conference champion. York resumed play the next year at the top level and slowly built itself into a contender. In 1970, the program won its first league title, earning a trip to the national tournament for the first time. The team followed up their bronze medal-finish with a runner-up spot in the conference final before the college landscape was upended.

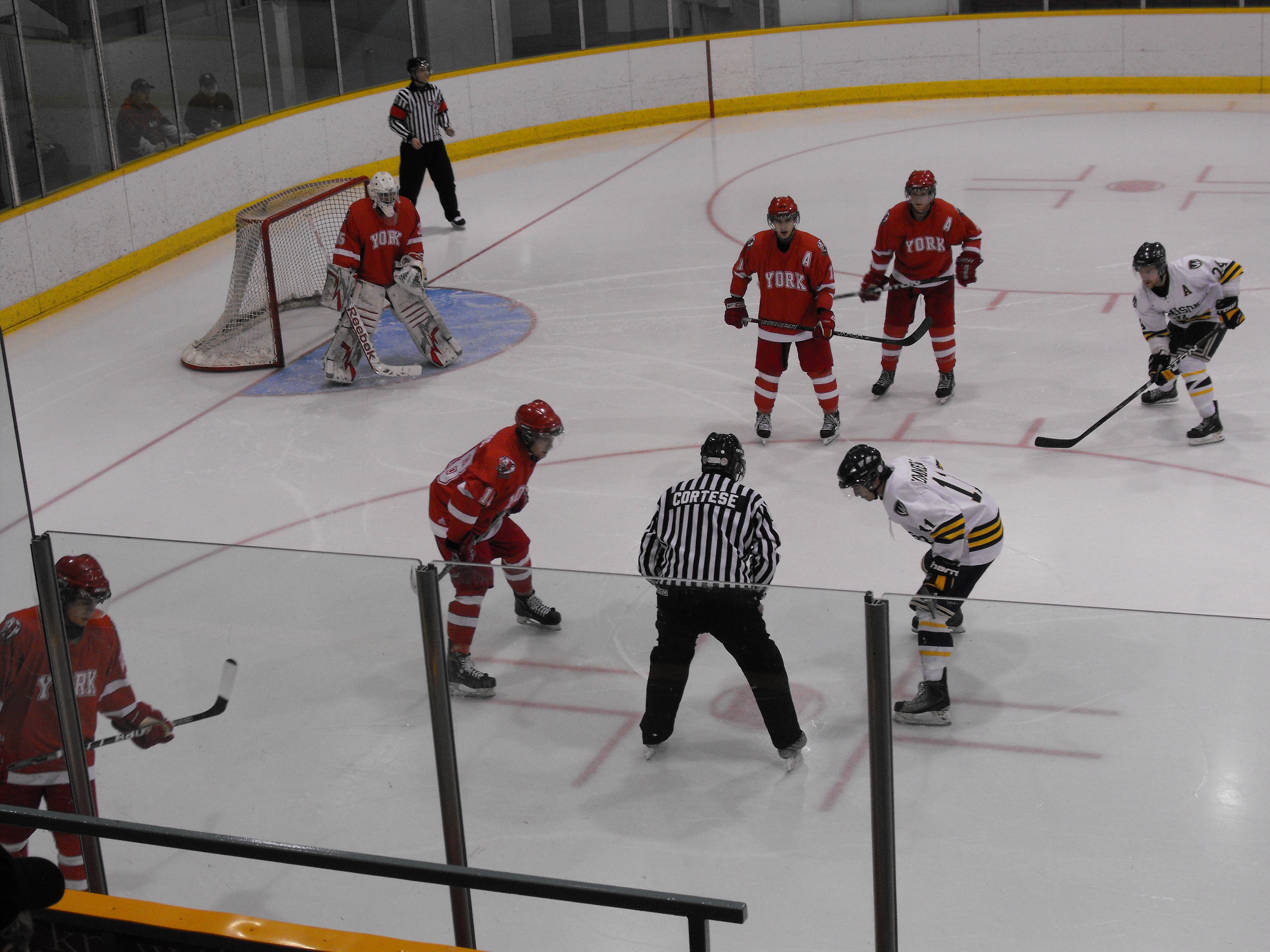
The Lions in a game against the Windsor Lancers in 2012.

In 1971, the four conferences that shared programs across Ontario and Quebec were realigned into two provincial leagues. York didn't appear to be bothered in the slightest by this development, posting winning records in seven consecutive seasons in their new league, the Ontario University Athletic Association (OUAA). Unfortunately, the Yeomen were unable to win a league championship and were prevented from returning to the University Cup.

After a lull in the early 80s, York returned in force in the middle of the decade, winning its first conference championship in 15 years. They won three close games in the University Cup series and captured the program's first national championship. York won the next three OUAA titles as well but it wasn't until 1988 that they were able too win their second University Cup. The program slumped a bit in 1989 but still earned an automatic bit to the tournament thanks to a runner-up finish in the OUAA playoffs. The defending champions then went on a tear and upset two heavily favored squads to win back-to-back championships.

York declined and spent most of the 90s as a middling team, though they did make two trips to the national tournament in 1997 and '99. In the early 21st century, the program recovered and ended a 16-year drought with a league championship in 2004. However, once again, the renamed-Lions slipped into the middle of the pack for much of the succeeding two decades. Other than 2017 and '18, the Lions have seen no success in the postseason.

== Season-by-season results ==
=== Senior and intermediate play ===
Note: GP = Games played, W = Wins, L = Losses, T = Ties, Pts = Points

Extra-League Champion	U Sports Semifinalist	Conference regular season champions	Conference Division Champions	Conference Playoff Champions

Season	Conference	Regular Season											Conference Tournament Results	National Tournament Results
Season	Conference	Conference						Overall					Conference Tournament Results	National Tournament Results
Season	Conference	GP	W	L	T	Pts*	Finish	GP	W	L	T	%	Conference Tournament Results	National Tournament Results
1962–63	OIAA	?	?	?	?	?	?	?	?	?	?	?		
1963–64	OIAA	?	?	?	?	?	N/A ^{†}	?	?	?	?	?		
Totals								GP	W	L	T	%	Championships	
Regular Season								?	?	?	?	?		
Conference Post-season								?	?	?	?	?		
Regular Season and Postseason Record								?	?	?	?	?		

† season ended early when the league cancelled its remaining schedule in protest.

=== Senior collegiate ===
Note: GP = Games played, W = Wins, L = Losses, T = Ties, OTL = Overtime Losses, SOL = Shootout Losses, Pts = Points

U Sports Champion	U Sports Semifinalist	Conference regular season champions	Conference Division Champions	Conference Playoff Champions

Season	Conference	Regular Season													Conference Tournament Results	National Tournament Results
Season	Conference	Conference								Overall					Conference Tournament Results	National Tournament Results
Season	Conference	GP	W	L	T	OTL	SOL	Pts*	Finish	GP	W	L	T/SOL	%	Conference Tournament Results	National Tournament Results
1964–65	OIAA	6	3	3	0	–	–	.500	T–4th	6	3	3	0	.500		
1965–66	OIAA	10	5	4	1	–	–	11	3rd	10	5	4	1	.550		
1966–67	OIAA	12	6	6	0	–	–	12	4th	12	6	6	0	.500		
1967–68	OIAA	12	8	4	0	–	–	16	2nd	12	8	4	0	.667		
1968–69	OIAA	10	5	5	0	–	–	10	4th	10	5	5	0	.500		
1969–70	OIAA	10	10	0	0	–	–	20	1st	14	13	1	0	.929	Won Championship, 8–2 (Laurentian)	Lost Quarterfinal, 1–4 (Saint Mary's); Won Consolation Semifinal, 12–3 (Alberta); Won Consolation Final, 7–3 (Loyola)
1970–71	OIAA	10	8	2	0	–	–	16	2nd	12	9	3	0	.750	Won Semifinal, 8–1 (Waterloo Lutheran); Lost Championship, 3–5 (Laurentian)	
1971–72	OUAA	19	16	1	2	–	–	34	1st	22	18	2	2	.864	Won Quarterfinal, 6–1 (Laurentian); Won Semifinal, 6–2 (Guelph); Lost Championship, 2–5 (Toronto)	
1972–73	OUAA	17	10	6	1	–	–	6	T–6th	18	10	7	1	.583	Lost Quarterfinal, 2–8 (Toronto)	
1973–74	OUAA	19	16	2	1	–	–	33	2nd	21	17	3	1	.833	Won Quarterfinal, 8–2 (Laurentian); Lost Semifinal, 4–8 (Guelph)	
1974–75	OUAA	14	9	2	3	–	–	21	2nd	17	11	3	3	.735	Won Quarterfinal, 9–2 (Ottawa); Won Semifinal, 9–3 (Western Ontario); Lost Championship, 3–4 (Toronto)	
1975–76	OUAA	14	10	4	0	–	–	20	3rd	17	12	5	0	.706	Won Quarterfinal, 14–0 (Ryerson); Won Semifinal, 5–2 (Western Ontario); Lost Championship, 4–5 (Guelph)	
1976–77	OUAA	19	16	2	1	–	–	33	1st	22	18	3	1	.841	Won Quarterfinal, 11–1 (Ryerson); Won Semifinal, 5–4 (Guelph); Lost Championship, 4–5 (Toronto)	
1977–78	OUAA	20	10	8	2	–	–	22	6th	22	11	9	2	.545	Won Quarterfinal, 8–1 (Laurentian); Lost Semifinal, 6–8 (Toronto)	
1978–79	OUAA	16	5	7	4	–	–	14	8th	?	?	?	?	?	Lost results unavailable	
1979–80	OUAA	22	8	11	3	–	–	19	8th	22	8	11	3	.432		
1980–81	OUAA	22	12	7	3	–	–	28	T–5th	24	13	8	3	.604	Won Quarterfinal, 5–4 (Guelph); Lost Semifinal series, 0–2 (Queen's)	
1981–82	OUAA	22	13	8	1	–	–	27	T–5th	23	13	9	1	.587	Lost Quarterfinal, 5–6 (McMaster)	
1982–83	OUAA	24	13	11	0	–	–	26	6th	25	13	12	0	.520	Lost Quarterfinal, 4–5 (Wilfrid Laurier)	
1983–84	OUAA	24	10	13	1	–	–	16 ^{†}	T–11th	24	10	13	1	.438		
1984–85	OUAA	24	15	9	0	–	–	30	5th	27	19	4	4	.778	Won Quarterfinal, 4–1 (Laurentian); Won Semifinal series, 2–0 (Toronto); Won Championship series, 2–1 (Western Ontario)	Won Semifinal series, 2–0 (Ottawa); Won Championship, 3–2 (Alberta)
1985–86	OUAA	24	18	5	1	–	–	36	3rd	34	25	8	1	.750	Won Quarterfinal, 4–3 (Waterloo); Won Semifinal series, 2–1 (Toronto); Won Championship series, 2–0 (Wilfrid Laurier)	Won Quarterfinal series, 2–1 (Dalhousie); Lost Semifinal, 2–5 (Quebec–Trois-Rivières)
1986–87	OUAA	24	19	2	3	–	–	.854	2nd	34	25	6	3	.779	Won Quarterfinal series, 2–0 (McMaster); Won Semifinal series, 2–1 (Windsor); Won Championship series, 2–1 (Western Ontario)	Lost Pool 2 Round-Robin, 1–2 (Alberta), 2–4 (Quebec–Trois-Rivières)
1987–88	OUAA	26	20	1	5	–	–	45	1st	34	28	1	5	.897	Won Division Semifinal series, 2–0 (Wilfrid Laurier); Won Division Final series, 2–0 (Western Ontario); Won Semifinal, 5–2 (Windsor); Won Championship, 5–1 (Western Ontario)	Won Semifinal, 4–3 (Calgary); Won Championship, 5–3 (Western Ontario)
1988–89	OUAA	26	14	9	3	–	–	29	6th	35	19	13	3	.586	Won Division Semifinal series, 2–1 (Waterloo); Lost Division Final series, 0–2 (Wilfrid Laurier); Won Semifinal, 5–4 (Quebec–Trois-Rivières); Lost Championship, 0–3 (Wilfrid Laurier)	Won Semifinal, 4–3 (Alberta); Won Championship, 5–2 (Wilfrid Laurier)
1989–90	OUAA	22	13	8	1	–	–	27	T–4th	28	16	11	1	.589	Won Quarterfinal series, 2–1 (Ottawa); Lost Semifinal series, 1–2 (Quebec–Trois-Rivières)	
1990–91	OUAA	22	14	8	0	–	–	28	5th	23	14	9	0	.609	Lost First Round, 4–5 (McGill)	
1991–92	OUAA	22	11	8	3	–	–	25	8th	24	11	10	3	.521	Lost Division Quarterfinal series, 0–2 (Quebec–Trois-Rivières)	
1992–93	OUAA	22	7	13	2	–	–	16	T–13th	22	7	13	2	.364		
1993–94	OUAA	26	10	15	1	–	–	21	10th	31	13	17	1	.435	Won Division Semifinal, 4–3 (Laurentian); Won Division Final series, 2–1 (Brock); Lost Semifinal, 1–2 (Western Ontario)	
1994–95	OUAA	26	12	12	2	–	–	26	10th	31	15	14	2	.516	Won Division Semifinal, 5–3 (Laurentian); Won Division Final series, 2–1 (Brock); Lost Semifinal, 2–7 (Western Ontario)	
1995–96	OUAA	26	13	9	4	–	–	30	8th	27	13	10	4	.556	Lost Division Semifinal, 3–4 (OT) (Brock)	
1996–97	OUAA	26	14	9	3	–	–	31	5th	31	17	11	3	.583	Won Division Final series, 2–0 (Laurentian); Won Semifinal, 5–4 (Western Ontario); Lost Championship, 0–3 (Guelph)	Lost Semifinal, 2–4 (Guelph)
1997–98	OUA	26	13	11	2	–	–	28	T–7th	30	16	12	2	.567	Won Division Final series, 3–0 (Brock); Lost Semifinal, 2–6 (Windsor)	
1998–99	OUA	25	8	10	7	–	–	33	10th	32	12	13	7	.484	Won Division Final series, 2–1 (Brock); Won Semifinal, 3–1 (Windsor); Lost Championship, 0–7 (Quebec–Trois-Rivières)	Lost Pool A Round-Robin, 5–2 (Quebec–Trois-Rivières), 0–4 (Alberta)
1999–00	OUA	26	9	14	3	–	–	21	T–10th	32	13	16	3	.453	Won Division Semifinal, 2–0 (Laurentian); Won Division Final series, 2–1 (Brock); Lost Semifinal, 1–5 (Western Ontario)	
2000–01	OUA	24	15	6	3	–	–	33	3rd	27	17	7	3	.685	Won Division Final series, 2–0 (Guelph); Lost Semifinal, 3–7 (Western Ontario)	
2001–02	OUA	24	17	4	3	–	–	37	2nd	27	19	5	3	.759	Won Division Final series, 2–0 (Brock); Lost Semifinal, 3–5 (Western Ontario)	
2002–03	OUA	24	17	6	1	–	–	35	4th	31	20	10	1	.661	Won Division Final series, 2–1 (Wilfrid Laurier); Won Semifinal, 3–1 (Lakehead); Lost Championship, 4–7 (Quebec–Trois-Rivières)	Lost Pool A Round-Robin, 0–4 (Alberta), 4–5 (St. Francis Xavier)
2003–04	OUA	24	15	5	4	0	–	34	3rd	30	19	7	4	.700	Won Division Final series, 2–0 (Wilfrid Laurier); Won Semifinal, 3–2 (Lakehead); Won Championship, 3–2 (Ottawa)	Lost Pool B Round-Robin, 2–4 (Dalhousie), 0–4 (St. Francis Xavier)
2004–05	OUA	24	12	6	5	1	–	30	6th	26	12	9	5	.558	Lost Division Semifinal series, 0–2 (Lakehead)	
2005–06	OUA	24	10	11	1	2	–	23	8th	26	10	15	1	.404	Lost Division Quarterfinal series, 0–2 (Lakehead)	
2006–07	OUA	28	13	10	3	2	–	31	T–7th	30	13	14	3	.483	Lost Division Quarterfinal series, 0–2 (Lakehead)	
2007–08	OUA	28	14	11	–	2	1	31	8th	30	14	15	1	.483	Lost Division Quarterfinal series, 0–2 (Western Ontario)	
2008–09	OUA	28	14	11	–	0	3	31	T–7th	30	14	13	3	.517	Lost Division Quarterfinal series, 0–2 (Western Ontario)	
2009–10	OUA	28	12	13	–	3	0	27	T–11th	31	13	18	0	.419	Lost Division Quarterfinal series, 1–2 (Lakehead)	
2010–11	OUA	28	10	16	–	1	1	22	17th	28	10	17	1	.375		
2011–12	OUA	28	14	10	–	1	3	31	9th	30	14	13	3	.517	Lost Division Quarterfinal series, 0–2 (Windsor)	
2012–13	OUA	28	14	14	–	0	0	28	13th	30	14	16	0	.467	Lost Division Quarterfinal series, 0–2 (Windsor)	
2013–14	OUA	28	13	13	–	1	1	28	T–12th	30	13	16	1	.450	Lost Division Quarterfinal series, 0–2 (Lakehead)	
2014–15	OUA	27	9	15	–	2	1	21	T–16th	27	9	17	1	.352		
2015–16	OUA	28	16	7	–	4	1	37	6th	30	16	13	1	.550	Lost Division Quarterfinal series, 0–2 (Toronto)	
2016–17	OUA	28	18	6	–	3	1	40	4th	37	25	11	1	.689	Won Division Quarterfinal series, 2–0 (Lakehead); Won Division Semifinal series, 2–0 (Guelph); Won Division Final series, 2–1 (Windsor); Won Championship, 4–3 (Queen's)	Lost Quarterfinal, 0–1 (OT) (Saskatchewan)
2017–18	OUA	28	17	10	–	0	1	35	7th	35	21	13	1	.614	Won Division Quarterfinal series, 2–1 (Lakehead); Won Division Semifinal series, 2–0 (Ryerson); Lost Division Final series, 1–2 (Brock); Lost Bronze Medal Game, 2–3 (Concordia)	
2018–19	OUA	28	12	14	–	2	0	26	T–14th	30	12	18	0	.400	Lost Division Quarterfinal series, 0–2 (Brock)	
2019–20	OUA	28	9	17	–	2	0	20	17th	28	9	19	0	.321		
2020–21	Season cancelled due to COVID-19 pandemic															
2021–22	OUA	16	6	8	–	2	0	.438	15th	17	6	11	0	.353	Lost Division Quarterfinal, 2–4 (Windsor)	
2022–23	OUA	27	12	13	–	2	0	26	16th	27	12	15	0	.444		
2023–24	OUA	28	3	22	–	2	1	9	19th	28	3	24	1	.107		
2024–25	OUA	28	7	16	–	2	3	19	17th	28	7	18	3	.250		
Totals										GP	W	L	T/SOL	%	Championships	
Regular Season										1329	695	534	100	.561	1 OIAA Championship, 3 OUAA Championships, 3 East Division Title, 1 Central Division Title, 9 Mid-West Division Titles, 1 West Division Title	
Conference Post-season										151	83	68	0	.550	1 OIAA Championships, 4 OUAA Championships, 2 OUAA Championships	
U Sports Postseason										21	10	11	0	.476	11 National Tournament appearances	
Regular Season and Postseason Record										1501	787	613	100	.558	3 National Championships	

† York was penalized 5 points in the standings for using an ineligible player.
Note: Totals include senior collegiate play only, except for 1978–79.
