= Alberta Golden Bears ice hockey =

- University: University of Alberta
- Conference: Canada West
- Head coach: Ian Herbers; Since 2018–19 season
- Assistant coaches: Stan Marple; Dallas Ansell; Derek Hemsley
- Arena: Clare Drake Arena; Edmonton, Alberta
- Colors: Green and Gold

U Sports tournament champions
- 1964, 1968, 1975, 1978, 1979, 1980, 1986, 1992, 1999, 2000, 2005, 2006, 2008, 2014, 2015, 2018

U Sports tournament appearances
- 1964, 1966, 1968, 1969, 1970, 1972, 1973, 1975, 1976, 1977, 1978, 1979, 1980, 1984, 1985, 1986, 1987, 1989, 1991, 1992, 1993, 1997, 1998, 1999, 2000, 2001, 2002, 2003, 2004, 2005, 2006, 2008, 2009, 2010, 2011, 2013, 2014, 2015, 2016, 2017, 2018, 2019, 2022, 2023

Conference tournament champions
- 1924, 1934, 1936, 1937, 1938, 1939, 1946, 1948, 1949, 1950, 1951, 1954, 1956, 1970, 1972, 1975, 1977, 1978, 1979, 1984, 1985, 1989, 1991, 1992, 1993, 1997, 2001, 2002, 2003, 2004, 2005, 2006, 2008, 2009, 2010, 2011, 2013, 2014, 2015, 2017, 2018, 2019, 2022

Conference regular season champions
- 1920, 1921, 1924, 1938, 1940, 1947, 1955, 1957, 1958, 1960, 1961, 1962, 1964, 1966, 1967, 1968, 1969, 1972, 1973, 1975, 1977, 1978, 1979, 1980, 1984, 1985, 1986, 1989, 1993, 1998, 1999, 2001, 2002, 2003, 2004, 2005, 2006, 2007, 2008, 2009, 2010, 2011, 2013, 2014, 2015, 2018, 2020, 2022

The Alberta Golden Bears ice hockey team is an ice hockey team representing the Alberta Golden Bears and Pandas athletics program of University of Alberta. The team is a member of the Canada West Universities Athletic Association conference and compete in U Sports. The Golden Bears play their home games at the Clare Drake Arena in Edmonton, Alberta.

== History ==
It's unclear exactly when Alberta played its first official game but the Golden Bears were estimated to have started by at least the 1910–11 season when they were members of the Edmonton League, a local senior circuit. Sparse records have Alberta playing in the league until 1935. In 1919, Alberta arranged an exhibition series with Saskatchewan and then forced the first western intercollegiate conference the following season along with Manitoba. Travel expenses proved too costly at the time and Alberta withdrew after the inaugural season. Alberta would resume its series with Saskatchewan in the mid-20s on a part-time basis but it wasn't until 1936 that they made the competition an annual rivalry.

Alberta suspended its program for World War II, as did all Canadian colleges, and returned in force in 1946. The Golden Bears won every league championship from 1936 until 1950 and were awarded the Halpenny Trophy, awarded to the league champion, on a permanent basis.

In 1963, the western league, which had existed as an isolated entity until that point, was one of four conferences to receive an invitation to send its champion to participate in the inaugural University Cup. Alberta won the league title the following year to attend the second tournament and swept through the competition to win the program's first national championship. Alberta appeared in five more tournaments during the competitions first ten years, however, troubles were brewing in their home conference. The Western Canadian Intercollegiate Athletic Association covered schools across a huge expanse from Hudson Bay to the Pacific Ocean. In 1972, in order to help reduce travel costs, the league was split in two with Alberta becoming a founding member of the Canada West Universities Athletic Association. The Golden Bears won the league title in seven of the first eight seasons and went on to capture four national titles over that span. During this time, head coach Clare Drake briefly left to take over the Edmonton Oilers but he returned after one season away and remained with the club until 1989.

After Drake's retirement, Alberta sustained its winning record, including two national titles in the 90s, four in the 2000s and three in the 10s. Alberta has won 29 championships since 1973, including 13 of 15 from 2001 to 2015. The result of which has been that the Golden Bears has accumulated 16 national championships and 44 tournament appearances (as of 2024).

== Season-by-season results ==
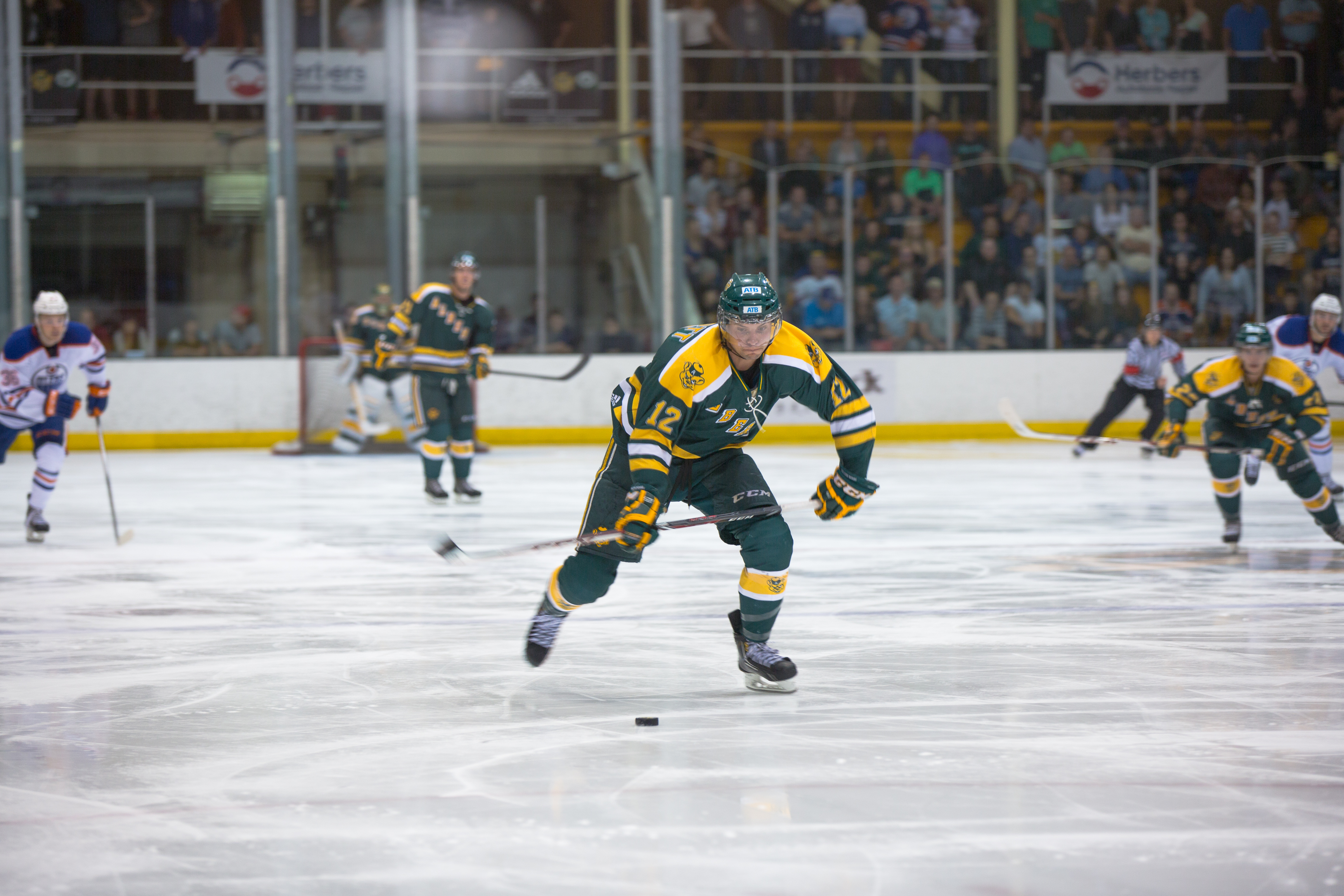
The Golden Bears played against the Edmonton Oilers rookies in 2014.

=== Senior and collegiate play ===
Note: GP = Games played, W = Wins, L = Losses, T = Ties, Pts = Points

| Extra-League Champion | U Sports Semifinalist | Conference regular season champions | Conference Division Champions | Conference Playoff Champions |

| Season | Conference | Regular Season | | | | | | | | | | | Conference Tournament Results | National Tournament Results |
| Season | Conference | Conference | | | | | | Overall | | | | | Conference Tournament Results | National Tournament Results |
| Season | Conference | GP | W | L | T | Pts* | Finish | GP | W | L | T | % | Conference Tournament Results | National Tournament Results |
|---|---|---|---|---|---|---|---|---|---|---|---|---|---|---|
Senior Hockey
| 1910–11 | Edmonton League | 7 | 5 | 2 | 0 | 10 | 2nd | ? | ? | ? | ? | ? | | |
| 1911–12 | Edmonton League | ? | ? | ? | ? | ? | ? | ? | ? | ? | ? | ? | | |
| 1912–13 | Edmonton League | ? | ? | ? | ? | ? | ? | ? | ? | ? | ? | ? | | |
| 1913–14 | Edmonton League | 6 | 3 | 2 | 1 | 7 | 2nd | ? | ? | ? | ? | ? | | |
| 1914–15 | Edmonton League | ? | ? | ? | ? | ? | ? | ? | ? | ? | ? | ? | | |
| 1915–16 | Edmonton League | 5 | 3 | 2 | 0 | 6 | 2nd | ? | ? | ? | ? | ? | | |
| 1916–17 | Edmonton League | ? | ? | ? | ? | ? | ? | ? | ? | ? | ? | ? | | |
| 1917–18 | Edmonton League | 4 | 1 | 3 | 0 | 2 | 3rd | ? | ? | ? | ? | ? | | |
| 1918–19 | Edmonton League | 6 | 3 | 3 | 0 | 6 | 2nd | ? | ? | ? | ? | ? | | |
| 1919–20 | Edmonton League | ? | ? | ? | ? | ? | 1st | ? | ? | ? | ? | ? | Lost Championship series, 4–5 (Carstairs) | |
| 1919–20 | WCIAU | 4 | 2 | 2 | 0 | 4 | 2nd | ? | ? | ? | ? | ? | | |
| 1920–21 | Edmonton League | 6 | 4 | 1 | 1 | 9 | 1st | ? | ? | ? | ? | ? | Lost Championship series, 6–8 (Calgary Alberta Pacific) | |
| 1921–22 | Edmonton League | ? | ? | ? | ? | ? | ? | ? | ? | ? | ? | ? | | |
| 1922–23 | Edmonton League | 1 | 0 | 1 | 0 | 0 | — ^{†} | ? | ? | ? | ? | ? | | |
| 1923–24 | Edmonton League | 12 | 8 | 2 | 2 | 18 | 1st | ? | ? | ? | ? | ? | Won Edmonton League Championship series, 7–3 (Camrose); Lost Alberta semifinal series 8–15 (Canmore) | |
| 1924–25 | Edmonton League | 7 | 4 | 3 | 0 | 8 | 2nd | ? | ? | ? | ? | ? | Lost Championship series, 10–14 (Edmonton Victorias) | |
| 1924–25 | WCIAU | 0 | 0 | 0 | 0 | 0 | — | ? | ? | ? | ? | ? | Lost Championship, 2–6 (Saskatchewan) | |
| 1925–26 | Edmonton League | 12 | 5 | 7 | 0 | 10 | 3rd | ? | ? | ? | ? | ? | | |
| 1926–27 | Edmonton League | 10 | 2 | 7 | 1 | 5 | 3rd | ? | ? | ? | ? | ? | | |
| 1926–27 | WCIAU | 0 | 0 | 0 | 0 | 0 | — | ? | ? | ? | ? | ? | Lost Championship, 1–4 (Saskatchewan) | |
| 1927–28 | Edmonton League | 12 | 2 | 10 | 0 | 4 | 4th | ? | ? | ? | ? | ? | | |
| 1928–29 | Edmonton League | 12 | 1 | 11 | 0 | 2 | 4th | ? | ? | ? | ? | ? | | |
| 1928–29 | WCIAU | 0 | 0 | 0 | 0 | 0 | — | ? | ? | ? | ? | ? | Lost Championship, 1–5 (Saskatchewan) | |
| 1929–30 | Edmonton League | 11 | 2 | 9 | 0 | 4 | 4th | ? | ? | ? | ? | ? | | |
| 1929–30 | WCIAU | 4 | 0 | 4 | 0 | 0 | 3rd | ? | ? | ? | ? | ? | | |
| 1930–31 | Edmonton League | 12 | 7 | 4 | 1 | 15 | 2nd | ? | ? | ? | ? | ? | Lost Championship series, 1–2 (Edmonton Superiors) | |
| 1931–32 | Edmonton League | 16 | 2 | 12 | 2 | 6 | 4th | ? | ? | ? | ? | ? | | |
| 1932–33 | Edmonton League | 8 | 1 | 7 | 0 | 2 | 3rd | ? | ? | ? | ? | ? | | |
| 1933–34 | Edmonton League | 6 | 3 | 3 | 0 | 6 | 2nd | ? | ? | ? | ? | ? | Lost Championship series, 0–2 (Edmonton Superiors) | |
| 1933–34 | WCIAU | 0 | 0 | 0 | 0 | 0 | — | ? | ? | ? | ? | ? | Won Championship series, 6–4 (Saskatchewan) | |
| 1934–35 | Edmonton League | 8 | 1 | 7 | 0 | 2 | 3rd | ? | ? | ? | ? | ? | Won Alberta First Round series, 11–2 (Leduc); Won Alberta Quarterfinal series, 6–5 (Lacombe); Lost Alberta Semifinal series, 3–4 (Vegreville) | |
| 1935–36 | WCIAU | 0 | 0 | 0 | 0 | 0 | — | ? | ? | ? | ? | ? | Won Championship series, 12–11 (Saskatchewan) | |
| 1936–37 | Northern Alberta League | 10 | 4 | 5 | 1 | 9 | — ^{‡} | ? | ? | ? | ? | ? | Lost Championship series, 0–2 (Edmonton Superiors) | |
| 1936–37 | WCIAU | 0 | 0 | 0 | 0 | 0 | — | ? | ? | ? | ? | ? | Won Championship series, 11–10 (Saskatchewan) | |
| 1937–38 | Northern Alberta League | 12 | 9 | 3 | 0 | 18 | 1st | ? | ? | ? | ? | ? | Lost Championship series, 3–5 (Red Deer) | |
| 1937–38 | WCIAU | 0 | 0 | 0 | 0 | 0 | — | ? | ? | ? | ? | ? | Won Championship series, 18–14 (Saskatchewan) | |
| 1938–39 | Northern Alberta League | 8 | 3 | 4 | 1 | 7 | 3rd | ? | ? | ? | ? | ? | | |
| 1938–39 | WCIAU | 0 | 0 | 0 | 0 | 0 | — | ? | ? | ? | ? | ? | Won Championship series, 25–16 (Saskatchewan) | |
| 1939–40 | Edmonton League | 11 | 9 | 2 | 0 | 18 | 1st | ? | ? | ? | ? | ? | Lost Championship, 2–8 (Army-Navy Cardinals) | |
| 1939–40 | WCIAU | 8 | 4 | 0 | 4 | 12 | 1st | ? | ? | ? | ? | ? | | |
Program suspended due to World War II
| 1945–46 | WCIAU | 0 | 0 | 0 | 0 | 0 | — | ? | ? | ? | ? | ? | Won Championship series, 20–16 (Saskatchewan) | |
| 1946–47 | WCIAU | 6 | 5 | 1 | 0 | 10 | 1st | ? | ? | ? | ? | ? | | |
| 1947–48 | WCIAU | 0 | 0 | 0 | 0 | 0 | — | ? | ? | ? | ? | ? | Won Championship series, 16–14 (Saskatchewan) | |
| 1948–49 | WCIAU | 0 | 0 | 0 | 0 | 0 | — | ? | ? | ? | ? | ? | Won Championship series, 4–1–1 (Saskatchewan) | |
| 1949–50 | WCIAU | 0 | 0 | 0 | 0 | 0 | — | ? | ? | ? | ? | ? | Won Championship series, 4–3 (Saskatchewan) | |
| 1950–51 | WCIAU | 0 | 0 | 0 | 0 | 0 | — | ? | ? | ? | ? | ? | Won Championship series, 3–2 (Saskatchewan) | |
| 1951–52 | WCIAU | 0 | 0 | 0 | 0 | 0 | — | ? | ? | ? | ? | ? | Lost Championship series, 1–3 (Saskatchewan) | |
| 1952–53 | WCIAU | 0 | 0 | 0 | 0 | 0 | — | ? | ? | ? | ? | ? | Lost Championship series, 2–3 (Saskatchewan) | |
| 1953–54 | WCIAU | 0 | 0 | 0 | 0 | 0 | — | ? | ? | ? | ? | ? | Won Championship series, 3–2 (Saskatchewan) | |
| 1954–55 | WCIAU | 8 | 6 | 2 | 0 | 12 | 1st | ? | ? | ? | ? | ? | | |
| 1955–56 | WCIAU | 0 | 0 | 0 | 0 | 0 | — | ? | ? | ? | ? | ? | Won Championship series, 3–1 (Saskatchewan) | |
| 1956–57 | WCIAU | 10 | 10 | 0 | 0 | 20 | 1st | ? | ? | ? | ? | ? | | |
| 1957–58 | WCIAU | 12 | 11 | 1 | 0 | 22 | 1st | ? | ? | ? | ? | ? | | |
| 1958–59 | WCIAU | 8 | 4 | 4 | 0 | 8 | 2nd | ? | ? | ? | ? | ? | | |
| 1959–60 | WCIAU | 8 | 7 | 1 | 0 | 14 | 1st | ? | ? | ? | ? | ? | | |
| 1960–61 | WCIAU | 8 | 7 | 0 | 1 | 15 | 1st | ? | ? | ? | ? | ? | | |
| 1961–62 | WCIAU | 12 | 11 | 1 | 0 | 22 | 1st | ? | ? | ? | ? | ? | | |
| Totals | | | | | | | | GP | W | L | T | % | Championships | |
| Regular Season | | | | | | | | ? | ? | ? | ? | ? | 3 Edmonton League Championships, 1 Northern Alberta League Championship, 8 WCIAU Championships | |
| Conference Post-season | | | | | | | | ? | ? | ? | ? | ? | 1 Edmonton League Championship, 12 WCIAU Championships | |
| Regular Season and Postseason Record | | | | | | | | ? | ? | ? | ? | ? | | |

† Alberta withdrew after one game.
‡ Alberta withdrew with 2 games remaining.

=== Collegiate only ===
Note: GP = Games played, W = Wins, L = Losses, T = Ties, OTL = Overtime Losses, SOL = Shootout Losses, Pts = Points

| U Sports Champion | U Sports Semifinalist | Conference regular season champions | Conference Division Champions | Conference Playoff Champions |

| Season | Conference | Regular Season | | | | | | | | | | | | | Conference Tournament Results | National Tournament Results |
| Season | Conference | Conference | | | | | | | | Overall | | | | | Conference Tournament Results | National Tournament Results |
| Season | Conference | GP | W | L | T | OTL | SOL | Pts* | Finish | GP | W | L | T | % | Conference Tournament Results | National Tournament Results |
|---|---|---|---|---|---|---|---|---|---|---|---|---|---|---|---|---|
Clare Drake (1958–1975)
| 1962–63 | WCIAA | 12 | 6 | 6 | 0 | – | – | 12 | 3rd | 12 | 6 | 6 | 0 | .500 | | |
| 1963–64 | WCIAA | 12 | 7 | 5 | 0 | – | – | 14 | 1st | 14 | 9 | 5 | 0 | .643 | | Won Semifinal, 5–3 (New Brunswick); Won Championship, 9–1 (Sir George Williams) |
| 1964–65 | WCIAA | 12 | 7 | 5 | 0 | – | – | 14 | T–2nd | 12 | 7 | 5 | 0 | .583 | | |
| 1965–66 | WCIAA | 12 | 11 | 1 | 0 | – | – | 22 | 1st | 14 | 12 | 2 | 0 | .857 | | Won Semifinal, 10–4 (Laurentian); Lost Championship, 1–8 (Toronto) |
| 1966–67 | WCIAA | 15 | 12 | 3 | 0 | – | – | 26 | T–1st | 16 | 12 | 4 | 0 | .750 | Lost Championship, 3–4 (Saskatchewan) | |
| 1967–68 | WCIAA | 16 | 11 | 5 | 0 | – | – | 22 | 1st | 19 | 14 | 5 | 0 | .737 | | Won Quarterfinal, 12–3 (St. Francis Xavier); Won Semifinal, 7–2 (Laurentian); Won Championship, 5–4 (Loyola) |
| 1968–69 | WCIAA | 20 | 16 | 4 | 0 | – | – | 32 | 1st | 23 | 18 | 5 | 0 | .783 | | Lost Semifinal, 2–3 (Toronto); Won Consolation Semifinal, 10–9 (Laurentian); Won Consolation Final, 5–3 (Saint Mary's) |
| 1969–70 | WCIAA | 14 | 11 | 3 | 0 | – | – | 22 | 2nd | 20 | 15 | 5 | 0 | .750 | Won Semifinal series, 2–0 (Manitoba); Won Championship series, 2–0 (Calgary) | Lost Semifinal, 2–3 (Toronto); Lost Consolation, 3–12 (York) |
| 1970–71 | WCIAA | 20 | 12 | 8 | 0 | – | – | 24 ^{¿} | 4th | 22 | 12 | 10 | 0 | .545 | Lost Semifinal series, 0–2 (Manitoba) | |
| 1971–72 | WCIAA | 20 | 18 | 2 | 0 | – | – | 36 | 1st | 23 | 20 | 3 | 0 | .909 | Won Semifinal, 6–2 (Manitoba); Won Championship, 3–1 (Calgary) | Lost Semifinal, 3–4 (Saint Mary's) |
| 1972–73 | Canada West | 24 | 17 | 7 | 0 | – | – | 34 | 1st | 28 | 19 | 9 | 0 | .679 | | Won West Quarterfinal series, 2–0 (Lakehead); Lost Semifinal series, 0–2 (Toronto) |
| 1973–74 | Canada West | 18 | 11 | 7 | 0 | – | – | 22 | 2nd | 20 | 11 | 9 | 0 | .550 | Lost Championship series, 0–2 (Calgary) | |
| 1974–75 | Canada West | 24 | 20 | 4 | 0 | – | – | 40 | 1st | 34 | 28 | 6 | 0 | .824 | Won Championship series, 2–1 (British Columbia) | Won West Quarterfinal series, 2–0 (Brandon); Won Semifinal series, 2–0 (Loyola); Won Championship series, 2–1 (Toronto) |
Leon Abbott (1975–1976)
| 1975–76 | Canada West | 24 | 16 | 8 | 0 | – | – | 32 | 2nd | 28 | 17 | 11 | 0 | .607 | Lost Championship series, 0–2 (Calgary) | Won West Regional Semifinal, 6–5 (Manitoba); Lost West Regional Final, 1–3 (Calgary) |
Clare Drake (1976–1979)
| 1976–77 | Canada West | 24 | 21 | 3 | 0 | – | – | 42 | 1st | 30 | 25 | 5 | 0 | .833 | Won Championship series, 2–1 (British Columbia) | Won Semifinal series, 12–5 (Saint Mary's); Lost Championship, 1–4 (Toronto) |
| 1977–78 | Canada West | 24 | 20 | 4 | 0 | – | – | 40 | 1st | 30 | 25 | 5 | 0 | .833 | Won Championship series, 2–1 (British Columbia) | Won Group 1 Round-robin, 7–3 (St. Francis Xavier), 7–3 (Regina); Won Championship, 6–5 (Toronto) |
| 1978–79 | Canada West | 24 | 20 | 4 | 0 | – | – | 40 | 1st | 30 | 25 | 5 | 0 | .833 | Won Championship series, 2–1 (Calgary) | Won Group 1 Round-robin, 7–1 (Concordia), 3–1 (Regina); Won Championship, 5–1 (Dalhousie) |
Billy Moores (1979–1980)
| 1979–80 | Canada West | 29 | 20 | 9 | 0 | – | – | 40 | 1st | 34 | 23 | 11 | 0 | .676 | Lost Championship series, 0–2 (Calgary) | Won Group 1 Round-robin, 2–0 (Calgary), 5–1 (Concordia); Won Championship, 7–3 (Regina) |
Clare Drake (1980–1983)
| 1980–81 | Canada West | 24 | 10 | 14 | 0 | – | – | 20 | 3rd | 24 | 10 | 14 | 0 | .417 | | |
| 1981–82 | Canada West | 24 | 11 | 13 | 0 | – | – | 22 | 3rd | 24 | 11 | 13 | 0 | .458 | | |
| 1982–83 | Canada West | 24 | 13 | 11 | 0 | – | – | 26 | 2nd | 26 | 13 | 13 | 0 | .500 | Lost Championship series, 0–2 (Saskatchewan) | |
Billy Moores (1983–1984)
| 1983–84 | Canada West | 24 | 20 | 4 | 0 | – | – | 40 | 1st | 30 | 24 | 5 | 1 | .817 | Won Championship series, 2–0 (Saskatchewan) | Won West Regional series, 2–0 (Manitoba); Lost Semifinal series, 5–7 (Concordia) |
Clare Drake (1984–1989)
| 1984–85 | Canada West | 24 | 20 | 4 | 0 | – | – | 40 | 1st | 32 | 25 | 6 | 1 | .797 | Won Championship series, 2–0 (Saskatchewan) | Won West Regional series, 2–1 (Manitoba); Won Semifinal series, 10–8 (Toronto); Lost Championship, 2–3 (York) |
| 1985–86 | Canada West | 28 | 20 | 8 | 0 | – | – | 40 | 1st | 33 | 23 | 10 | 0 | .697 | Lost Semifinal series, 1–2 (Saskatchewan) | Won Semifinal, 5–4 (Moncton); Won Championship, 5–2 (Quebec–Trois-Rivières) |
| 1986–87 | Canada West | 28 | 19 | 8 | 1 | – | – | 39 | 2nd | 30 | 20 | 9 | 1 | .683 | Participated in World University Games. | Lost Pool 2 Round-robin, 4–5 (Quebec–Trois-Rivières), 2–1 (York) |
| 1987–88 | Canada West | 28 | 22 | 5 | 1 | – | – | 45 | T–2nd | 34 | 25 | 8 | 1 | .750 | Won Semifinal series, 2–1 (Saskatchewan); Lost Championship series, 1–2 (Calgary) | |
| 1988–89 | Canada West | 28 | 21 | 7 | 0 | – | – | 42 | T–1st | 34 | 25 | 9 | 0 | .735 | Won Semifinal series, 2–0 (Manitoba); Won Championship series, 2–1 (Calgary) | Lost Semifinal, 3–4 (York) |
Billy Moores (1989–1994)
| 1989–90 | Canada West | 28 | 20 | 6 | 2 | – | – | 42 | 2nd | 32 | 22 | 8 | 2 | .719 | Won Semifinal series, 2–0 (British Columbia); Lost Championship series, 0–2 (Calgary) | |
| 1990–91 | Canada West | 28 | 19 | 7 | 2 | – | – | 40 | 2nd | 35 | 24 | 9 | 2 | .714 | Won Semifinal series, 2–0 (Saskatchewan); Won Championship series, 2–1 (Regina) | Won Semifinal, 5–4 (Waterloo); Lost Championship, 2–7 (Quebec–Trois-Rivières) |
| 1991–92 | Canada West | 28 | 17 | 6 | 5 | – | – | 39 | 2nd | 35 | 23 | 7 | 5 | .729 | Won Semifinal series, 2–1 (Calgary); Won Championship series, 2–0 (Regina) | Won Semifinal, 5–4 (Quebec–Trois-Rivières); Won Championship, 5–2 (Acadia) |
| 1992–93 | Canada West | 28 | 18 | 6 | 4 | – | – | 40 | 1st | 33 | 22 | 7 | 4 | .727 | Won Semifinal series, 2–0 (Saskatchewan); Won Championship series, 2–0 (Regina) | Lost Semifinal, 4–9 (Acadia) |
| 1993–94 | Canada West | 28 | 15 | 6 | 7 | – | – | 37 | 3rd | 30 | 15 | 8 | 7 | .617 | Lost Semifinal series, 0–2 (Calgary) | |
Peter Esdale (1994–1995)
| 1994–95 | Canada West | 28 | 11 | 12 | 5 | – | – | 27 | 5th | 28 | 11 | 12 | 5 | .482 | | |
Rob Daum (1995–2005)
| 1995–96 | Canada West | 28 | 17 | 10 | 1 | – | – | 35 | 2nd | 33 | 19 | 13 | 1 | .591 | Won Division Semifinal series, 2–1 (Lethbridge); Lost Division Final series, 0–2 (Calgary) | |
| 1996–97 | Canada West | 26 | 20 | 5 | 1 | – | – | 40 | 2nd | 34 | 26 | 7 | 1 | .779 | Won Division Semifinal series, 2–1 (Lethbridge); Won Division Final series, 2–0 (Calgary); Won Championship series, 2–0 (Saskatchewan) | Lost Semifinal, 3–4 (New Brunswick) |
| 1997–98 | Canada West | 28 | 19 | 4 | 5 | – | – | 43 | T–1st | 35 | 23 | 7 | 5 | .729 | Won Division Final series, 2–0 (Calgary); Lost Championship series, 1–2 (Saskatchewan) | Lost Pool A Round-robin, 2–5 (New Brunswick), 6–3 (Windsor) |
| 1998–99 | Canada West | 28 | 20 | 6 | 2 | – | – | 42 | 1st | 35 | 25 | 8 | 2 | .743 | Won Division Final series, 2–0 (Calgary); Lost Championship series, 0–2 (Saskatchewan) | Won Pool A Round-robin, 5–2 (Quebec–Trois-Rivières), 4–0 (York); Won Championship, 6–2 (Moncton) |
| 1999–00 | Canada West | 28 | 20 | 3 | 5 | – | – | 45 | 2nd | 36 | 26 | 5 | 5 | .792 | Won Division Final series, 2–0 (Calgary); Lost Championship series, 1–2 (Saskatchewan) | Won Pool B Round-robin, 3–1 (Quebec–Trois-Rivières), 4–2 (Calgary); Won Championship, 5–4 (2OT) (New Brunswick) |
| 2000–01 | Canada West | 28 | 25 | 1 | 2 | – | – | 52 | 1st | 34 | 29 | 3 | 2 | .882 | Won Division Final series, 2–0 (Calgary); Won Championship series, 2–0 (Manitoba) | Lost Pool A Round-robin, 3–5 (Western Ontario), 3–5 (St. Francis Xavier) |
| 2001–02 | Canada West | 28 | 21 | 3 | 4 | – | – | 46 | 1st | 34 | 26 | 4 | 4 | .824 | Won Semifinal series, 2–0 (Manitoba); Won Championship series, 2–0 (Saskatchewan) | Lost Pool A Round-robin, 1–4 (Western Ontario), 8–0 (Guelph) |
| 2002–03 | Canada West | 28 | 24 | 2 | 2 | – | – | 50 | 1st | 35 | 29 | 4 | 2 | .857 | Won Division Final series, 2–0 (Calgary); Won Championship series, 2–1 (Saskatchewan) | Lost Pool A Round-robin, 4–0 (York), 2–3 (St. Francis Xavier) |
| 2003–04 | Canada West | 28 | 26 | 0 | 2 | – | – | 54 | 1st | 35 | 31 | 2 | 2 | .914 | Won Division Final series, 2–0 (Calgary); Won Championship series, 2–0 (Saskatchewan) | Lost Pool A Round-robin, 7–3 (Ottawa), 5–6 (New Brunswick); Lost Bronze medal Game, 1–4 (Dalhousie) |
| 2004–05 | Canada West | 28 | 24 | 3 | 1 | – | – | 49 | 1st | 35 | 31 | 3 | 1 | .900 | Won Division Final series, 2–0 (Calgary); Won Championship series, 2–0 (Saskatchewan) | Won Pool A Round-robin, 11–0 (Quebec–Trois-Rivières), 5–1 (Manitoba); Won Championship, 5–4 (OT) (Saskatchewan) |
Eric Thurston (2005–2011)
| 2005–06 | Canada West | 28 | 21 | 5 | 2 | – | – | 44 | 1st | 35 | 28 | 5 | 2 | .829 | Won Division Final series, 2–0 (Calgary); Won Championship series, 2–0 (Saskatchewan) | Won Pool A Round-robin, 8–2 (Wilfrid Laurier), 5–1 (McGill); Won Championship, 3–2 (Lakehead) |
| 2006–07 | Canada West | 28 | 20 | 4 | – | 4 | – | 22 | 1st | 32 | 22 | 10 | 0 | .688 | Won Division Final series, 2–0 (British Columbia); Lost Championship series, 0–2 (Saskatchewan) | |
| 2007–08 | Canada West | 28 | 21 | 5 | – | 2 | – | 44 | 1st | 35 | 27 | 8 | 0 | .771 | Won Semifinal series, 2–0 (Manitoba); Won Championship series, 2–0 (Saskatchewan) | Won Pool B Round-robin, 1–2 (Moncton), 7–3 (McGill); Won Championship, 3–2 (New Brunswick) |
| 2008–09 | Canada West | 28 | 22 | 4 | – | 0 | 2 | 46 | 1st | 35 | 27 | 6 | 2 | .800 | Won Semifinal series, 2–1 (Regina); Won Championship series, 2–0 (Saskatchewan) | Won Pool A Round-robin, 3–6 (New Brunswick), 2–1 (Lakehead) |
| 2009–10 | Canada West | 28 | 23 | 4 | – | 0 | 1 | 47 | 1st | 36 | 29 | 6 | 1 | .819 | Won Semifinal series, 2–0 (Calgary); Won Championship series, 2–1 (Manitoba) | Won Pool A Round-robin, 4–2 (Quebec–Trois-Rivières), 5–3 (Lakehead); Lost Championship, 2–3 (OT) (Saint Mary's) |
| 2010–11 | Canada West | 28 | 19 | 6 | – | 2 | 1 | 41 | 1st | 34 | 23 | 10 | 1 | .691 | Won Semifinal series, 2–0 (Manitoba); Won Championship series, 2–0 (Calgary) | Lost Pool B Round-robin, 1–3 (St. Francis Xavier), 3–6 (McGill) |
Stan Marple (2011–2012)
| 2011–12 | Canada West | 28 | 20 | 6 | – | 1 | 1 | 42 | 2nd | 31 | 21 | 9 | 1 | .694 | Lost Semifinal series, 1–2 (Saskatchewan) | |
Ian Herbers (2012–2015)
| 2012–13 | Canada West | 28 | 23 | 4 | – | 0 | 1 | 47 | 1st | 35 | 28 | 6 | 1 | .814 | Won Semifinal series, 2–0 (Calgary); Won Championship series, 2–1 (Saskatchewan) | Lost Pool A Round-robin, 1–2 (Waterloo), 4–3 (OT) (Saint Mary's) |
| 2013–14 | Canada West | 28 | 25 | 2 | – | 1 | 0 | 51 | 1st | 35 | 32 | 3 | 0 | .914 | Won Semifinal series, 2–0 (British Columbia); Won Championship series, 2–0 (Calgary) | Won Pool A Round-robin, 3–2 (Carleton), 3–2 (2OT) (McGill); Won Championship, 3–1 (Saskatchewan) |
| 2014–15 | Canada West | 28 | 24 | 3 | – | 1 | 0 | 49 | 1st | 35 | 31 | 4 | 0 | .886 | Won Semifinal series, 2–0 (British Columbia); Won Championship series, 2–0 (Calgary) | Won Quarterfinal, 5–1 (St. Francis Xavier); Won Semifinal, 5–1 (Quebec–Trois-Rivières); Won Championship, 6–3 (New Brunswick) |
Serge Lajoie (2015–2018)
| 2015–16 | Canada West | 28 | 19 | 7 | – | 1 | 1 | 40 | 2nd | 33 | 21 | 11 | 1 | .652 | Won Semifinal series, 2–0 (Mount Royal); Lost Championship series, 0–2 (Saskatchewan) | Lost Quarterfinal, 2–6 (St. Francis Xavier) |
| 2016–17 | Canada West | 28 | 18 | 8 | – | 2 | 0 | 38 | 2nd | 34 | 22 | 12 | 0 | .647 | Won Semifinal series, 2–0 (Calgary); Won Championship series, 2–1 (Saskatchewan) | Lost Quarterfinal, 1–4 (Acadia) |
| 2017–18 | Canada West | 28 | 23 | 4 | – | 1 | 0 | 47 | 1st | 35 | 30 | 5 | 0 | .857 | Won Semifinal series, 2–0 (Mount Royal); Won Championship series, 2–0 (Saskatchewan) | Won Quarterfinal, 8–6 (Acadia); Won Semifinal, 3–2 (OT) (Saskatchewan); Won Championship, 4–2 (St. Francis Xavier) |
Ian Herbers (2018–Present)
| 2018–19 | Canada West | 28 | 24 | 3 | – | 1 | 0 | 49 | 2nd | 36 | 30 | 6 | 0 | .833 | Won Semifinal series, 2–0 (Calgary); Won Championship series, 2–1 (Saskatchewan) | Won Quarterfinal, 7–1 (Lethbridge); Won Semifinal, 3–0 (Saskatchewan); Lost Championship, 2–4 (New Brunswick) |
| 2019–20 | Canada West | 28 | 23 | 5 | – | 0 | 0 | 46 | T–1st | 31 | 24 | 7 | 0 | .774 | Lost Semifinal series, 1–2 (British Columbia) | |
| 2020–21 | Season cancelled due to COVID-19 pandemic | | | | | | | | | | | | | | | |
| 2021–22 | Canada West | 20 | 16 | 3 | – | 1 | 0 | 33 | 1st | 27 | 22 | 5 | 0 | .815 | Won Semifinal series, 2–0 (Calgary); Won Championship series, 2–0 (British Columbia) | Won Quarterfinal, 7–0 (Acadia); Won Semifinal, 7–3 (St. Francis Xavier); Lost Championship, 4–5 (2OT) (Quebec–Trois-Rivières) |
| 2022–23 | Canada West | 28 | 20 | 5 | – | 2 | 1 | 43 | 2nd | 37 | 25 | 11 | 1 | .689 | Won Semifinal series, 2–1 (British Columbia); Lost Championship series, 1–2 (Calgary) | Won Quarterfinal, 7–0 (Windsor); Won Semifinal, 4–1 (Prince Edward Island); Lost Championship, 0–3 (New Brunswick) |
| 2023–24 | Canada West | 28 | 18 | 8 | – | 2 | 0 | 38 | 5th | 34 | 21 | 13 | 0 | .618 | Won Quarterfinal series, 2–1 (Saskatchewan); Lost Semifinal series, 1–2 (British Columbia) | |
| Totals | | | | | | | | | | GP | W | L | T/SOL | % | Championships | |
| Regular Season | | | | | | | | | | 1519 | 1107 | 350 | 62 | .749 | 6 WCIAA Championships, 1 West Division Title, 30 Canada West Championships, 10 Mountain Division Titles | |
| Conference Post-season | | | | | | | | | | 193 | 136 | 57 | 0 | .705 | 2 WCIAA Championships, 28 Canada West Championships | |
| U Sports Postseason | | | | | | | | | | 113 | 76 | 35 | 2 | .681 | 44 National tournament appearances | |
| Regular Season and Postseason Record | | | | | | | | | | 1825 | 1319 | 442 | 64 | .740 | 16 National Championships | |

¿ Alberta forfeited 4 games during the season for use of ineligible player. This is their adjusted record at the end of the season.
Totals include games since 1962–63.
Note: Games not counted towards University Cup appearances are not included.

== See also ==
Alberta Pandas ice hockey
