= 1987 CIAU University Cup =

Canadian hockey tournament

Tournament details
- Venue(s): Varsity Arena, Edmonton, Alberta
- Dates: March 19–22
- Teams: 6

Final positions
- Champions: Quebec–Trois-Rivières Patriotes (1st title)
- Runners-up: Saskatchewan Huskies

Tournament statistics
- Games played: 7

Awards
- MVP: Marc Gervais (Quebec–Trois-Rivières)

The 1987 CIAU Men's University Cup Hockey Tournament (25th annual) was held at the Varsity Arena in Edmonton, Alberta. The Alberta Golden Bears served as tournament host.

== Road to the Cup ==
=== AUAA playoffs ===
Semifinals
K1	Dalhousie	3	2	—
M2	Prince Edward Island	4**	4	—
M1	Moncton	3	4	4
K2	St. Francis Xavier	4**	2	5*

Championship
M2	Prince Edward Island	3	4	—
K2	St. Francis Xavier	1	2	—

Note: * denotes overtime period(s)

=== Canada West playoffs ===
Semifinal
1	Calgary	5	4	—
4	British Columbia	0	3	—
2	Manitoba	1	5	1
3	Saskatchewan	3	2	5

Championship
1	Calgary	5	7	2
3	Saskatchewan	4	9	6

Note: * denotes overtime period(s)

=== OUAA playoffs ===
Queen's Cup Quarterfinals
1	Western Ontario	7	4	—
8	Guelph	0	1	—
4	Waterloo	4	?	—
5	Wilfrid Laurier	5	?	—
2	York	2	5	—
7	McMaster	1	2	—
3	Toronto	1	1	—
6	Windsor	2	5	—

Queen's Cup Semifinals
1	Western Ontario	9	3	4
4	Wilfrid Laurier	1	4	1
2	York	7	2	2
6	Windsor	1	3	1

Championship
1	Western Ontario	2	5	1
2	York	6	3	2

Note: * denotes overtime period(s)

=== QUAA playoffs ===
Semifinals					Championship
					1	Quebec–Trois-Rivières	8	3	6	5	—	—	—
2	Ottawa	3	1	2	3	McGill	0	1	4	4	—	—	—
3	McGill	1	6	3

Note: * denotes overtime period(s)

== University Cup ==
The tournament reverted to a round-robin format with four conference champions joined by a tournament host and one wild-card. The teams were arranged so that one team from OUAA and Canada West would be in each group, preventing intra-conference matches in pool play. Additionally, the champions of the two conferences were placed in different pools so that each pool would only have two conference champions. The remaining two teams were distributed by committee.

Team	Qualification	Record	Appearance	Last
Alberta Golden Bears	Host	19–8–1	17th	1986
Prince Edward Island Panthers	Atlantic: AUAA Champion	24–4–0	2nd	1985
Quebec–Trois-Rivières Patriotes	Quebec: QUAA Champion	18–2–2	3rd	1986
Saskatchewan Huskies	West: Canada West Champion	20–13–1	5th	1983
Western Ontario Mustangs	Wild-card: OUAA Runner-up	25–5–2	1st	Never
York Yeomen	Ontario: OUAA Champion	25–4–3	4th	1986

=== Bracket ===
	Pool 1	PEI	SAS	UWO	Overall
1	Prince Edward Island		L 0–3	W 3–1	1–1
4	Saskatchewan	W 3–0		W 5–2	2–0
5	Western Ontario	L 1–3	L 2–5		0–2

	Pool 2	ALB	QTR	YOR	Overall
2	Alberta		L 4–5	W 2–1	1–1
3	Quebec–Trois-Rivières	W 5–4		W 4–2	2–0
6	York	L 1–2	L 2–4		0–2

Championship; March 22
Saskatchewan	3
Quebec–Trois-Rivières	6

Note: * denotes overtime period(s)
Note: round-robin games were played on consecutive days March 19–21

== Championship final ==
March 22, 1987	Quebec–Trois-Rivières Patriotes	6–3	Saskatchewan Huskies	Varsity Arena, Edmonton, Alberta
