= Western Mustangs men's ice hockey =

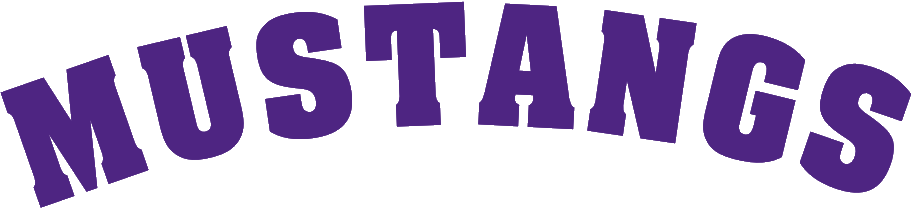
- University: University of Western Ontario
- Conference: OUA; OUA West Division
- First season: 1923–24
- Head coach: Clarke Singer; 20th season, 372–124–17 (.742)
- Assistant coaches: Patrick Ouellet; Dave Warren
- Arena: Thompson Arena; London, Ontario
- Colors: Purple and White
- Fight song: "Western"
- Mascot: J.W. the Mustang

U Sports tournament champions
- 2002

U Sports tournament appearances
- 1987, 1988, 1994, 1995, 2000, 2001, 2002, 2005, 2009, 2011, 2012, 2016, 2020

Conference tournament champions
- 1995, 2005, 2009

Conference regular season champions
- 1987, 1989, 1994, 2002, 2003, 2004, 2005, 2006, 2013

The Western Mustangs men's ice hockey team represents Western University (in full, The University of Western Ontario) in Canadian university competition. The Mustangs are members of Ontario University Athletics, one of the four regional associations within the national governing body of U Sports. The Mustangs play at Thompson Arena in London, Ontario.

The men's hockey team has won 3 OUA championships (1994–95, 2004–05, 2008–09) and 1 U Sports championship (2001–02)

== Team history ==
=== Early history ===
In 1905, the first hockey club was established at the University of Western Ontario. The sporting teams were organized by the two faculties at Western during this time, the Arts & Divinity faculty and the Medical "Meds" faculty. The teams practiced on ice rinks around London, as well as on the Thames river. By the 1913-14 season, hockey became the most popular sport on campus and a combined faculty team went on to represent Western in the Canadian Hockey Association championships, playing Berlin (now Kitchener, Ontario) in the final match. Western lost 6-4.

=== Start of intercollegiate hockey ===
Western entered the intercollegiate competition in the 1923-24 season. This league comprised St. Michael’s College of Toronto, the Ontario Agricultural College and the University of Toronto. The team also played some exhibition games during 1920s, including a game against Princeton University in the 1926-27 season and one against the University of Michigan in the 1928-29 season.

In the 1932-33 season, Western won its first Canadian Intermediate Intercollegiate Championship by beating the University of Ottawa in the finals 6-1. Hockey at Western proceeded into the 1930s but was suspended in 1941-44 due to World War II. When the London Arena was not available for the 1936–37 season, J. Howard Crocker arranged to play home games in Brantford, and have practices an outdoor rink on campus. After the war, the team kept competing in the Intermediate Intercollegiate league, as well as the senior London City League.

The team continued until the mid 1950s. During this time, a lack of funding and ice time caused the team to be cancelled in 1955. The university did not have a rink at this time and there was little funding for intermediate teams.

=== Senior intercollegiate hockey and the OUA ===
In the 1964-65 season, Western joined the Ontario-Quebec Athletic Association. This was due to large support from Bill L’Heureux over the years prior. During this season, L'Heureux acted as the coach and the team placed third in a ten-team league, finishing 4th in the playoffs. While attending Western, Brian Conacher played with the Mustangs during their first season. Ron Watson took over as coach in 1965 and coached the Mustangs for 20 seasons, leading the team to the playoffs 18 years out of his 20 year reign.

=== 1980s–2000s ===
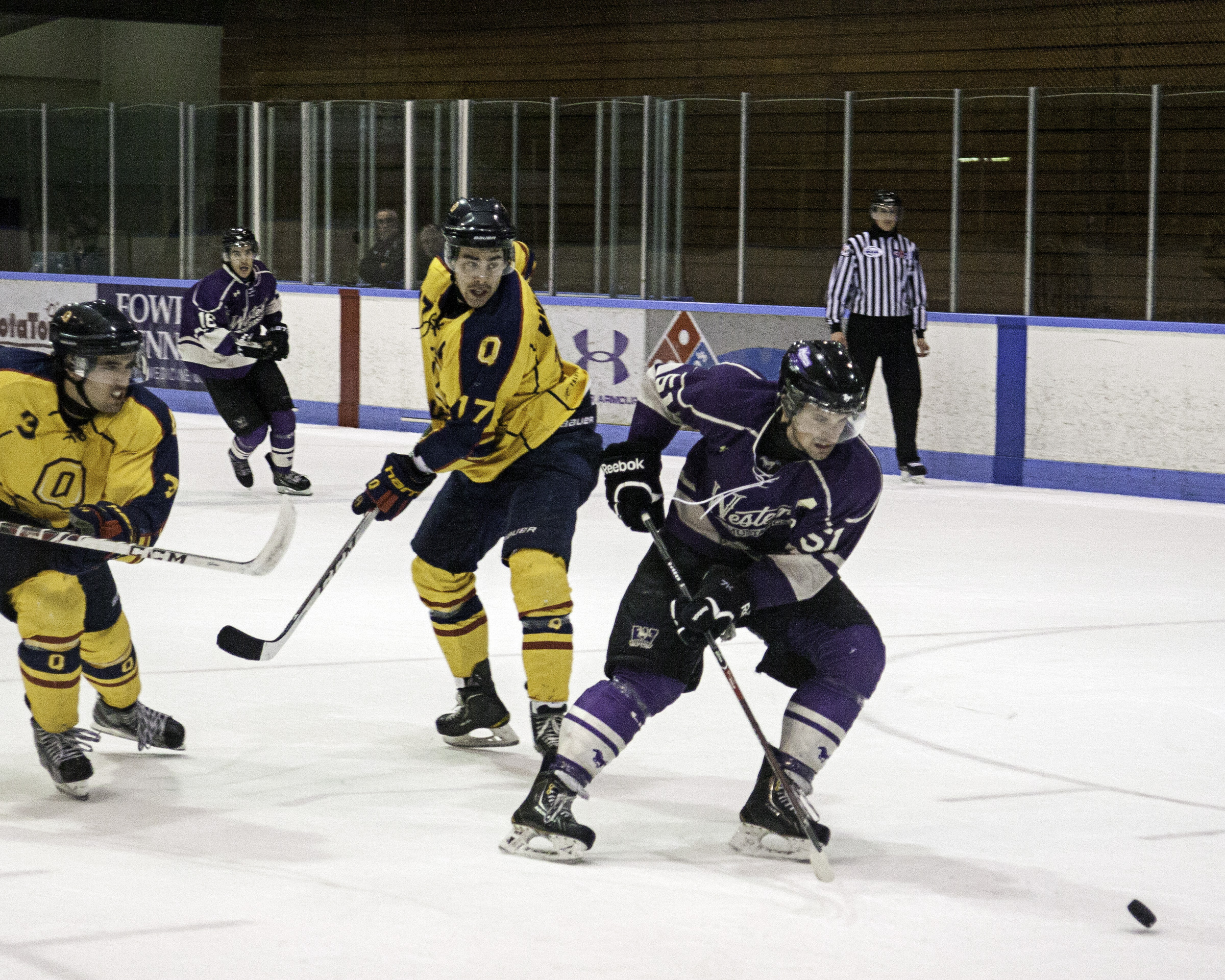
A Western vs. Queen's game in 2013

After Ron Watson, Barry Martinelli took over in 1985. Mike Tomlak played for Western in the 1986-87 season. The team had medium success during this time, but it started to rise when Steve Rucchin joined the Mustangs from 1990 to 1994. Rucchin scored 24 points in his first year, 62 points in his second, and 48 points in his third. On this rising success, Western won the first league OUA title in the 1994-95 season. Martinelli retired as coach in 1999, where the position was filled by the assistant coach at the time, Clarke Singer.

Clarke Singer is the current coach of the Western Mustangs and has been coaching the team since 1999. He has brought the team to its only national championship in 2001.

== Season-by-season results ==
=== Senior and collegiate play ===
Note: GP = Games played, W = Wins, L = Losses, T = Ties, Pts = Points

U Sports Champion	U Sports Semifinalist	Conference regular season champions	Conference Division Champions	Conference Playoff Champions

Season	Conference	Regular Season											Conference Tournament Results	National Tournament Results
Season	Conference	Conference						Overall					Conference Tournament Results	National Tournament Results
Season	Conference	GP	W	L	T	Pts*	Finish	GP	W	L	T	%	Conference Tournament Results	National Tournament Results
Junior Hockey
1914–15	OHA	4	3	1	0	6	T–1st	?	?	?	?	?	Won Group 8 Final series, 17–13 (Woodstock); Lost quarterfinal series, 5–7 (Berlin Union Jacks)	
Program suspended due to World War I
Senior and Intercollegiate Hockey
1923–24	Intermediate	?	?	?	?	?	?	?	?	?	?	?		
1924–25	Intermediate	?	?	?	?	?	?	?	?	?	?	?		
1925–26	Intermediate	4	1	2	1	3	?	?	?	?	?	?		
1926–27	Intermediate	5	2	2	1	5	T–1st	?	?	?	?	?	Lost Championship, 2–3 (Royal Military College)	
1927–28	Intermediate	6	3	1	2	8	2nd	?	?	?	?	?	Lost Semifinal series, 5–8 (Toronto jr. varsity)	
1928–29	Intermediate	?	?	?	?	?	?	?	?	?	?	?		
1928–29	OHA	8	5	3	0	10	?	?	?	?	?	?	Won OHA Group 11 Final series, 6–4 (Glencoe); Lost OHA First Round series, 1–14 (Windsor)	
1929–30	Intermediate	2	1	0	1	3	?	?	?	?	?	?	Lost Intermediate Western Final series, 8–9 (Toronto jr. varsity)	
1929–30	OHA	9	1	7	1	3	?	?	?	?	?	?	Lost OHA Section B Round-Robin, 3–4 (Ingersoll), 0–2 (Paris)	
1930–31	Intermediate / OHA	4	1	3	0	2	?	?	?	?	?	?		
1931–32	Intermediate	5	3	2	0	6	?	?	?	?	?	?		
1931–32	OHA	6	3	1	2	16	?	?	?	?	?	?	Lost OHA Group 11 series, 2–6 (Windsor)	
1932–33	Intermediate	6	5	1	1	10	T–3rd	?	?	?	?	?	Won Championship, 6–1 (Ottawa)	
1932–33	OHA	4	3	0	1	7	?	?	?	?	?	?	Lost OHA Section B series, 3–7 (Chatham Maroons)	
1933–34	OHA	7	1	5	1	12	?	?	?	?	?	?		
1934–35	OHA	8	1	7	0	4	?	?	?	?	?	?		
1935–36	OHA	12	2	7	3	7	?	?	?	?	?	?		
Program suspended
1937–38	Intermediate	6	4	2	0	8	?	?	?	?	?	?		
1938–39	Intermediate	6	1	5	0	2	?	?	?	?	?	?		
Totals								GP	W	L	T	%	Championships	
Regular Season								?	?	?	?	?	1 Intermediate Championship	
Conference Post-season								?	?	?	?	?		
Regular Season and Postseason Record								?	?	?	?	?		

Note: In 1931 the OHA used the Intermediate results for its standings rather than holding a separate schedule.

=== Collegiate only ===
Note: GP = Games played, W = Wins, L = Losses, T = Ties, OTL = Overtime Losses, SOL = Shootout Losses, Pts = Points

U Sports Champion	U Sports Semifinalist	Conference regular season champions	Conference Division Champions	Conference Playoff Champions

Season	Conference	Regular Season													Conference Tournament Results	National Tournament Results
Season	Conference	Conference								Overall					Conference Tournament Results	National Tournament Results
Season	Conference	GP	W	L	T	OTL	SOL	Pts*	Finish	GP	W	L	T	%	Conference Tournament Results	National Tournament Results
1964–65	QOAA	16	11	4	1	–	–	23	3rd	17	11	5	1	.676	Lost Semifinal, 4–6 (Montreal)	
1965–66	QOAA	16	12	2	2	–	–	26	2nd	16	12	2	2	.813		
1966–67	QOAA	16	10	6	0	–	–	20	3rd	17	10	7	0	.588	Lost Semifinal, 2–6 (Waterloo)	
1967–68	QOAA	16	7	9	0	–	–	18	5th	16	7	9	0	.438		
1968–69	QOAA	15	7	7	1	–	–	15	6th	15	7	7	1	.500		
1969–70	QOAA	15	5	6	4	–	–	14	7th	15	5	6	4	.467		
1970–71	QOAA	15	4	8	3	–	–	11	9th	15	4	8	3	.367		
1971–72	OUAA	19	11	5	3	–	–	25	3rd	21	12	6	3	.643	Won Western Semifinal, 5–2 (Windsor); Lost Semifinal, 2–5 (Toronto)	
1972–73	OUAA	17	14	3	0	–	–	28	2nd	20	16	4	0	.800	Won Western Semifinal, 7–1 (Windsor); Won Semifinal, 5–4 (Laurentian); Lost Championship, 1–8 (Toronto)	
1973–74	OUAA	17	13	4	0	–	–	26	4th	20	15	5	0	.750	Won Quarterfinal, 4–1 (Guelph); Won Semifinal, 6–4 (Toronto); Lost Championship, 1–8 (Waterloo)	
1974–75	OUAA	17	11	4	2	–	–	24	3rd	19	12	5	2	.684	Won Western Semifinal, 12–3 (Wilfrid Laurier); Lost Semifinal, 2–5 (York)	
1975–76	OUAA	20	14	6	0	–	–	26	T–3rd	21	14	7	0	.667	Lost Semifinal, 2–5 (York)	
1976–77	OUAA	20	9	9	2	–	–	20	T–7th	20	9	9	2	.500		
1977–78	OUAA	20	14	3	3	–	–	31	3rd	22	15	4	3	.750	Won Quarterfinal, 9–4 (Windsor); Lost Semifinal, 0–6 (Wilfrid Laurier)	
1978–79	OUAA	16	7	5	4	–	–	18	6th	18	8	6	4	.556	Won Quarterfinal, ? (Wilfrid Laurier); Lost Semifinal, ? (Guelph)	
1979–80	OUAA	22	11	9	2	–	–	24	7th	22	11	9	2	.545		
1980–81	OUAA	22	14	4	4	–	–	32	2nd	26	16	6	4	.692	Won Semifinal series, 2–0 (Toronto); Lost Championship series, 0–2 (Queen's)	
1981–82	OUAA	22	12	9	1	–	–	25	7th	22	12	9	1	.568		
1982–83	OUAA	24	20	4	0	–	–	40	2nd	27	21	6	0	.778	Lost Semifinal series, 1–2 (Wilfrid Laurier)	
1983–84	OUAA	24	15	8	1	–	–	31	3rd	30	18	11	1	.617	Won Quarterfinal, 9–4 (Queen's); Won Semifinal series, 2–1 (Wilfrid Laurier); Lost Championship series, 0–2 (Toronto)	
1984–85	OUAA	24	15	7	2	–	–	32	3rd	30	19	9	2	.667	Won Quarterfinal, 8–5 (Guelph); Won Semifinal series, 2–0 (Wilfrid Laurier); Lost Championship series, 1–2 (York)	
1985–86	OUAA	24	17	5	2	–	–	36	4th	27	18	7	2	.704	Won Quarterfinal, 4–3 (Windsor); Lost Semifinal series, 0–2 (Wilfrid Laurier)	
1986–87	OUAA	24	20	2	2	–	–	.875	1st	34	25	7	2	.765	Won Quarterfinal series, 2–0 (Windsor); Won Semifinal series, 2–1 (Wilfrid Laurier); Lost Championship series, 1–2 (York)	Lost Pool 1 Round-Robin, 2–5 (Saskatchewan), 1–3 (Prince Edward Island)
1987–88	OUAA	26	17	4	5	–	–	39	3rd	34	21	8	5	.691	Won Division Semifinal series, 2–0 (Waterloo); Lost Division Final series, 0–2 (York); Won Semifinal, 3–2 (Quebec–Trois-Rivières); Lost Championship, 1–5 (York)	Won Semifinal, 3–1 (Prince Edward Island); Lost Championship, 3–5 (York)
1988–89	OUAA	26	19	2	5	–	–	43	T–1st	28	19	4	5	.768	Lost Division Semifinal series, 0–2 (Wilfrid Laurier)	
1989–90	OUAA	22	11	9	2	–	–	24	8th	24	11	11	2	.500	Lost Division Semifinal series, 0–2 (Wilfrid Laurier)	
1990–91	OUAA	22	12	7	3	–	–	27	T–6th	23	12	8	3	.587	Lost First Round, 2–3 (Guelph)	
1991–92	OUAA	22	16	5	1	–	–	33	2nd	24	16	7	1	.688	Lost Quarterfinal series, 0–2 (Wilfrid Laurier)	
1992–93	OUAA	22	12	8	2	–	–	26	T–6th	23	12	9	2	.565	Lost First Round, 4–8 (Windsor)	
1993–94	OUAA	24	22	1	1	–	–	45	1st	29	25	3	1	.879	Won Quarterfinal series, 2–0 (Queen's); Won Semifinal, 2–1 (York); Lost Championship, 1–2 (Guelph)	Lost Semifinal, 5–6 (Guelph)
1994–95	OUAA	24	16	6	2	–	–	34	2nd	29	20	7	2	.724	Won Quarterfinal series, 2–0 (Waterloo); Won Semifinal, 7–2 (York); Won Championship, 5–4 (Guelph)	Lost Semifinal, 4–5 (Moncton)
1995–96	OUAA	26	16	8	2	–	–	34	3rd	27	16	9	2	.630	Lost Division Semifinal, 4–5 (2OT) (Windsor)	
1996–97	OUAA	26	15	11	0	–	–	30	T–6th	29	16	13	0	.552	Won Division Semifinal, 6–2 (Windsor); Lost Division Final series, 0–2 (Waterloo)	
1997–98	OUA	26	15	8	3	–	–	33	5th	29	16	10	3	.603	Lost Division Semifinal series, 1–2 (Waterloo)	
1998–99	OUA	26	14	12	0	–	–	28	8th	26	14	12	0	.538		
1999–00	OUA	26	19	3	4	–	–	42	T–2nd	32	22	6	4	.750	Won Division Final series, 2–0 (Wilfrid Laurier); Won Semifinal, 5–1 (York); Lost Championship, 2–3 (Quebec–Trois-Rivières)	Lost Pool A Round-Robin, 2–3 (New Brunswick), 2–3 (Saskatchewan)
2000–01	OUA	24	21	3	0	–	–	42	2nd	30	25	5	0	.833	Won Division Final series, 2–0 (Waterloo); Won Semifinal, 7–3 (York); Lost Championship, 3–4 (Quebec–Trois-Rivières)	Lost Pool A Round-Robin, 2–5 (St. Francis Xavier), 5–3 (Alberta)
2001–02	OUA	24	22	0	2	–	–	46	1st	32	28	2	2	.906	Won Division Final series, 2–1 (Lakehead); Won Semifinal, 5–3 (York); Lost Championship, 4–5 (Quebec–Trois-Rivières)	Won Pool A Round-Robin, 5–2 (Guelph), 4–1 (Alberta); Won Championship, 4–3 (3OT) (Quebec–Trois-Rivières)
2002–03	OUA	24	24	0	0	–	–	48	1st	26	24	2	0	.923	Lost Division Final series, 0–2 (Lakehead)	
2003–04	OUA	24	21	3	0	0	–	42	1st	27	22	5	0	.815	Lost Division Final series, 1–2 (Lakehead)	
2004–05	OUA	24	17	6	0	1	–	35	T–1st	33	22	11	0	.667	Won Division Final series, 2–1 (Waterloo); Won Semifinal series, 2–1 (Lakehead); Won Championship, 4–0 (Quebec–Trois-Rivières)	Lost Pool A Round-Robin, 3–8 (Moncton), 0–3 (Saskatchewan)
2005–06	OUA	24	21	2	1	0	–	43	T–1st	27	22	4	1	.833	Lost Division Final series, 1–2 (Lakehead)	
2006–07	OUA	28	17	6	3	2	–	39	4th	34	20	11	3	.632	Won Division Quarterfinal series, 2–1 (Brock); Lost Division Semifinal series, 1–2 (Waterloo)	
2007–08	OUA	28	18	5	–	1	4	41	3rd	34	21	9	4	.676	Won Division Quarterfinal series, 2–1 (York); Lost Division Semifinal series, 1–2 (Brock)	
2008–09	OUA	28	19	7	–	2	0	41	3rd	38	26	12	0	.684	Won Division Quarterfinal series, 2–1 (Guelph); Won Division Semifinal series, 2–0 (York); Won Division Final series, 2–0 (Wilfrid Laurier); Won Championship, 2–1 (McGill)	Won Pool B Round-Robin, 3–4 (McGill), 7–2 (Saint Mary's); Lost Championship, 2–4 (New Brunswick)
2009–10	OUA	28	21	7	–	0	0	42	3rd	35	25	10	0	.714	Won Division Quarterfinal series, 2–1 (Ontario Tech); Won Division Semifinal series, 2–0 (Windsor) 'Lost Division Final series, 0–2 (Lakehead)	
2010–11	OUA	28	20	3	–	2	3	45	2nd	38	27	8	3	.750	Won Division Quarterfinal series, 2–0 (Windsor); Won Division Semifinal series, 2–1 (Waterloo); Won Division Final series, 2–0 (Guelph); Lost Championship, 2–6 (McGill)	Lost Pool B Round-Robin, 3–2 (Calgary), 0–4 (New Brunswick)
2011–12	OUA	28	21	4	–	1	2	45	2nd	39	29	8	2	.769	Won Division Quarterfinal series, 2–0 (Wilfrid Laurier); Won Division Semifinal series, 2–0 (Brock); Won Division Final series, 2–1 (Windsor); Lost Championship, 1–4 (McGill)	Won Pool B Round-Robin, 3–2 (3OT) (Quebec–Trois-Rivières), 3–2 (New Brunswick); Lost Championship, 3–4 (OT) (McGill)
2012–13	OUA	28	21	5	–	1	1	44	1st	33	24	8	1	.742	Won Division Quarterfinal series, 2–0 (Ontario Tech); Lost Division Semifinal series, 1–2 (Waterloo)	
2013–14	OUA	28	21	6	–	1	0	43	4th	34	24	10	0	.706	Won Division Quarterfinal series, 2–1 (Guelph); Lost Division Semifinal series, 1–2 (Windsor)	
2014–15	OUA	27	19	7	–	1	0	39	5th	29	19	10	0	.655	Lost Division Quarterfinal series, 0–2 (Lakehead)	
2015–16	OUA	28	18	10	–	0	0	36	7th	37	24	13	0	.649	Won Division Quarterfinal series, 2–0 (Wilfrid Laurier); Won Division Semifinal series, 2–1 (Toronto); Won Division Final series, 2–1 (Guelph); Lost Championship, 3–4 (OT) (Quebec–Trois-Rivières)	Lost Quarterfinal, 1–5 (New Brunswick)
2016–17	OUA	28	8	16	–	2	2	20	17th	28	8	18	2	.321		
2017–18	OUA	28	14	11	–	2	1	31	12th	31	15	15	1	.500	Lost Division Quarterfinal series, 1–2 (Ryerson)	
2018–19	OUA	28	15	12	–	0	1	31	T–9th	35	19	15	1	.557	Won Division Quarterfinal series, 2–0 (Wilfrid Laurier); Won Division Semifinal series, 2–1 (Brock); Lost Division Final series, 1–2 (Guelph); Lost Bronze Medal Game, 0–3 (Carleton)	
2019–20	OUA	28	11	13	–	4	0	26	15th	39	18	21	0	.462	Won Division Quarterfinal series, 2–1 (Toronto); Won Division Semifinal series, 2–1 (Ryerson); Lost Division Final series, 1–2 (Guelph); Won Bronze Medal Game, 5–2 (Concordia)	Won Quarterfinal, 3–2 (Saskatchewan); Remainder of tournament cancelled
2020–21	Season cancelled due to COVID-19 pandemic															
2021–22	OUA	14	7	7	–	0	0	.500	T–11th	15	7	8	0	.467	Lost First Round, 4–5 (2OT) (Ryerson)	
2022–23	OUA	27	11	11	–	5	0	27	T–12th	27	11	16	0	.407		
2023–24	OUA	28	10	18	–	0	0	20	16th	28	10	18	0	.357		
Totals										GP	W	L	T/SOL	%	Championships	
Regular Season										1361	874	400	89	.674	1 Central Division Title, 9 Far West Division Titles, 9 West Division Titles, 3 OUAA Championships, 6 OUA Championships	
Conference Post-season										188	102	86	0	.543	1 OUAA Championship, 2 OUA Championships	
U Sports Postseason										25	11	14	0	.440	13 National Tournament appearances	
Regular Season and Postseason Record										1576	987	500	89	.655	1 National Championship	

Note: Totals include results from 1964–65 onward.

== Notable players ==
Western has had multiple NHL and All-Canadian players over the years. These include:

- Brian Conacher (NHL)
- Robbie Moore (NHL)
- Reg Higgs (NHL)
- Ian McKegney (NHL)
- Brent Imlach (NHL)
- Mike Tomlak (NHL and All-Canadian)
- Steve Rucchin (NHL and All-Canadian)
- Pete Fraser (All-Canadian)
- Chris McCauley (All-Canadian)
- Mark Guy (All-Canadian)
- Sean Basilio (All-Canadian)
- Jeff Petrie (All-Canadian)
