= Marty Raymond =

Canadian ice hockey player and coach

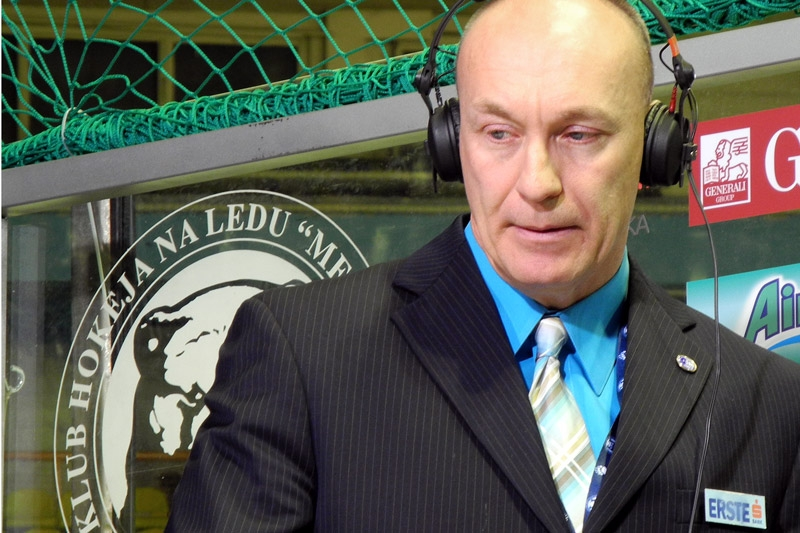
- Born: October 2, 1964 (age 61) Drummondville, Quebec, Canada
- Position: Head coach
- MSHSL team: Cotter Schools Boys Hockey
- NHL draft: Undrafted
- Playing career: 1986–2002

Marty Raymond (born October 2, 1964) is a Canadian professional ice hockey coach and former player. Raymond is the current head coach for the Cotter Schools Rambler boys hockey program, scheduled to compete in the Minnesota State High School League (MSHSL) in 2020-21. Raymond has served as head coach of the Hungarian club SAPA Fehérvár AV19 in the Austrian Hockey League. Prior to joining SAPA Fehérvár AV19 during the 2013 off season, he spent two seasons coaching KHL Medveščak, another EBEL club. Raymond was the long-time coach of the ECHL's Bakersfield Condors.

== Lawsuit ==
In January 2011, Raymond was named in a lawsuit filed by former Bakersfield Condor player Jason Bailey in which Bailey alleges that he was "forced to endure a barrage of anti-Semitic, offensive and degrading verbal attacks regarding his Jewish faith," from Bakersfield Condors head coach Raymond and "suffered severe and/or pervasive harassment," from assistant coach Mark Pederson. On January 27, ESPN.com released details of the filed court documents and reported that the NHL was also investigating.

A court case initiated by Bailey against the team, and former coaches Raymond and Pederson, was litigated. In the proceedings as reported by ESPN, the following letter of apology from Raymond to Bailey was presented and included in the statement of the claim, Raymond wrote:

It was not my intention to offend you. The intent was to have a jovial moment. Please understand that prior to this incident, I was not trained to handle such a sensitive matter as coach. As a French-Canadian, I too have come face-to-face with bigotry and understand how such remarks can negatively affect lives. I can certainly relate to you as I have repeatedly been called "Frog" through my playing and coaching career. This has affected me on and off the ice. Now that I understand you were offended, I will no longer engage in this type of behavior nor condone it. I look forward to moving on and making the run for the playoffs as a team.

— Martin "Marty" Raymond

Documents filed with the Superior Court of Kern County on Nov. 4 indicated that counsel for Bailey voluntarily filed a request to have the Court dismiss all claims of religious discrimination against the team.

The Condors owner Jonathan Fleisig, as well as the individual coaches, maintained that the claims of Bailey were patently false and unfounded. However, they were unable to explain the letters of apology filed in court.

The pending dismissal comes without a settlement of any kind for Bailey, the Condors said.

Bailey was assigned to the Condors by the Anaheim Ducks in the 2008–09 season and played in 35 games.

"In even the most unmeritorious cases, plaintiffs can receive nuisance value settlements paid by defendants who simply want to avoid the costs of litigation, but in this case, Bailey dismissed his claims without receiving a single thing in return," Bryan Freedman, counsel for the Condors, said in statement. "Bailey's willingness to dismiss the case in the absence of receiving any settlement certainly evidences the frivolity of his claims."

Bailey filed the suit in Orange County Superior Court in January, accusing Raymond and Pederson of antisemitism. It was transferred to Kern County Superior Court, with a different attorney, in July.

"We feel vindicated after this ridiculous ordeal," Condors owner Jonathan Fleisig said in a statement. "To have our team name and the city of Bakersfield dragged through the mud by these claims is reprehensible. We have always considered ourselves an upstanding organization in this community and a proud representative of Bakersfield and Kern County."

Raymond left the team in June to take a coaching position in Europe.

== Cotter Schools boys' hockey program ==
In 2020, Raymond was hired as the boys' hockey coach at Cotter Schools, in Winona, Minnesota. In 2021, the Cotter Schools hockey program played its first varsity season after the dissolution of the 30-year cooperative agreement with Winona Area Public Schools. According to the online news source The Winona Journal, the cooperative was dissolved at the request of an anonymous booster.

In 2021, it was reported that Cotter Schools finished with a record of either 1-11 or 1-10 in MSHSL games. Ambiguity exists in the record due to the fact that Cotter was forced to use opponent's players as goalies from the Dodge County boys hockey team in their game on February 8, 2022. The MSHSL has yet to rule on a decision as to whether using an opponent's players in a varsity contest would negate the varsity distinction of the contest or if there is any effect on the eligibility of the Dodge County students who suited up for the Ramblers and Coach Raymond.

Robb Leer and Leer Communications were hired prior to the start of the 2021 season to handle the public relations strategy of the team. Through the work of Leer Communications, Cotter Schools received press shining a light over several unique aspects of their program. One such article arranged by Leer spotlighted the Rambler's goalie Jozef Zilinec who played in the Slovakia professional league for three seasons prior to suiting up for Coach Raymond. Another article about Raymond, written by Peter Odney in Minnesota's Youth Hockey Hub, notes that in addition to coaching the boys' hockey team, additional duties for Raymond include monitoring the recently built overnight residential dormitory at Cotter. Odney's article also is notable in that it independently confirms Raymond's brief coaching stint with the Los Angeles Kings AAA youth program. The LA Kings AAA youth team was covered by several news outlets including Helene Elliott with the LA Times and Katie Strang with The Athletic. on April 1, 2019.
