= 1985 CIAU University Cup =

Canadian hockey tournament

Tournament details
- Venue(s): Varsity Arena, Toronto, Ontario
- Dates: March 8–17
- Teams: 6

Final positions
- Champions: York Yeomen (1st title)
- Runners-up: Alberta Golden Bears

Tournament statistics
- Games played: 10

Awards
- MVP: Don McLaren (York)

The 1985 CIAU Men's University Cup Hockey Tournament (23rd annual) was held at the Varsity Arena in Toronto, Ontario. The Toronto Varsity Blues served as tournament host.

== Road to the Cup ==
=== AUAA playoffs ===
Semifinals
1	Prince Edward Island	4	4	—
4	Dalhousie	3	3	—
2	Moncton	4	4	9
3	Acadia	5	3	3

Championship
1	Prince Edward Island	5	2*	—
2	Moncton	4	1	—

Note: * denotes overtime period(s)

=== Canada West playoffs ===
Championship
1	Alberta	2	7	—
2	Saskatchewan	1	4	—

Note: * denotes overtime period(s)

=== GPAC playoffs ===
Semifinal; February 22-23					Championship; March 1-2
					1	Manitoba	3	8	—
2	Regina	8	8	—	2	Regina	2	2	—
3	Lakehead	2	1	—

Note: * denotes overtime period(s)

=== OUAA playoffs ===
Quarterfinals
3	Western Ontario	8
6	Guelph	5
4	Laurentian	1
5	York	4

Semifinals
1	Toronto	3	3	—
5	York	5	4	—
2	Wilfrid Laurier	2	5	—
3	Western Ontario	9	6	—

Championship
5	York	1	4	5
3	Western Ontario	5	3	2

Note: * denotes overtime period(s)

=== QUAA playoffs ===
Semifinals
1	Quebec–Chicoutimi	6	6	—
4	McGill	2	3	—
2	Ottawa	2	8	7
3	Quebec–Trois-Rivières	3	6	2

Championship
1	Quebec–Chicoutimi	2	3	?	3	—
2	Ottawa	6	6	?	4	—

Note: * denotes overtime period(s)

== University Cup ==
The tournament reverted to a bracket format. Since the OUAA served as tournament host and possessed two entrants, both teams received byes into the semifinal round. The first round was arranged as a regional final with the two western teams and two eastern teams each battling for a spot in the national semifinals.

The regional rounds were played as best of three series while the national semifinals were set as two-game total-goal series. The championship game remained a single elimination match.

The East regionals were held in Winnipeg, Manitoba. The West regionals were held in Gatineau, Quebec.

=== East regional ===
Team	Qualification	Record	Appearance	Last
Ottawa Gee-Gees	Quebec: QUAA Champion	15–10–2	1st	Never
Prince Edward Island Panthers	Atlantic: AUAA Champion	24–4–0	1st	Never *

* UPEI was formed from a merger of Saint Dunstan's University and Prince of Wales College, the former of which had participated in the 1965 CIAU University Cup.

=== West regional ===
Team	Qualification	Record	Appearance	Last
Alberta Golden Bears	West: Canada West Champion	22–4–0	15th	1984
Manitoba Bisons	Plains: GPAC Champion	19–3–4	5th	1984

=== Ontario byes ===
Team	Qualification	Record	Appearance	Last
Toronto Varsity Blues	Host	19–4–3	16th	1984
York Yeomen	Ontario: OUAA Champion	20–10–0	2nd	1970

=== Bracket ===
Regional Finals; March 8–10
Ottawa	2	3	—
Prince Edward Island	1	2	—
Alberta	5	1	6
Manitoba	1	5	5

Semifinals; March 15–16
York	5	6	11
Ottawa	3	5	8
Toronto	5	3	8
Alberta	7	3	10

Championship; March 17
York	3
Alberta	2

Note: * denotes overtime period(s)

== Championship final ==
March 17, 1985	York Yeomen	3–2	Alberta Golden Bears	Varsity Arena, Toronto, Ontario
