= 1986 CIAU University Cup =

Canadian hockey tournament

Tournament details
- Venue(s): Varsity Arena, Edmonton, Alberta
- Dates: March 14–23
- Teams: 7

Final positions
- Champions: Alberta Golden Bears (7th title)
- Runners-up: Quebec–Trois-Rivières Patriotes

Tournament statistics
- Games played: 10

Awards
- MVP: Dennis Cranston (Alberta)

The 1986 CIAU Men's University Cup Hockey Tournament (24th annual) was held at the Varsity Arena in Edmonton, Alberta. The Alberta Golden Bears served as the tournament host.

== Road to the Cup ==
=== AUAA playoffs ===
Semifinals
K1	Dalhousie	5	6	5
M2	Prince Edward Island	8	5	3
M1	Moncton	8	8	—
K2	St. Francis Xavier	2	4	—

Championship
K1	Dalhousie	6	7	4
M1	Moncton	2	9	9

Note: * denotes overtime period(s)

=== Canada West playoffs ===
Semifinal; February 28-March 2
1	Alberta	3	5	3
4	Saskatchewan	8	3	6
2	Calgary	4	2	4
3	Manitoba	3	4	3

Championship; March 7-9
4	Saskatchewan	3	6	3
2	Calgary	9	3	4

Note: * denotes overtime period(s)

=== OUAA playoffs ===
Quarterfinals; February 25
3	York	4
6	Waterloo	3
4	Western Ontario	4
5	Windsor	3

Semifinals; February 27–March 4
1	Wilfrid Laurier	3	4	—
4	Western Ontario	2	3	—
2	Toronto	1	4	1
3	York	2	3	2

Championship; March 6, 8
1	Wilfrid Laurier	4	3	—
3	York	6	6	—

Note: * denotes overtime period(s)

=== QUAA playoffs ===
Semifinals
1	Quebec–Trois-Rivières	7	3	10
4	Concordia	2	6	2
2	Ottawa	5	2	6
3	McGill	3	5	4

Championship
1	Quebec–Trois-Rivières	9	3	3	6	—
2	Ottawa	8	2	7	5	—

Note: * denotes overtime period(s)

== University Cup ==
Due to the collapse of the GPAC's ice hockey division, there were now only four conferences playing senior collegiate hockey. Despite this, the selection committee decided to increase the number of bids into the tournament by adding two wild-card spots. The teams were ranked according to the following criteria; the host team (Alberta) received a bye into the semifinals. The four league champions were then ranked 1–4 and placed in the regional brackets accordingly. The two wild-card teams were then seeded so that there would not be any intra-conference games in the regional finals. The teams were re-ranked for the semifinals and arranged so that the top-ranked team played the lowest-ranked team.

The regional rounds were played as best of three series while the remainder of the tournament were single elimination matches.

The East regionals were held at the Jean-Louis Lévesque Arena in Moncton, New Brunswick. The Central regionals were held at the York University Ice Palace in Toronto, Ontario. The West regionals were held at the Colisée de Trois-Rivières in Trois-Rivières, Quebec. Because UQTR was seeded higher than Calgary, the Patriotes hosted the West regional.

Seed	Team	Qualification	Record	Appearance	Last
H	Alberta Golden Bears	Host	21–10–0	16th	1985
1	Moncton Aigles Bleus	Atlantic: AUAA Champion	24–5–0	7th	1983
2	York Yeomen	Ontario: OUAA Champion	23–6–1	3rd	1985
3	Quebec–Trois-Rivières Patriotes	Quebec: QUAA Champion	20–7–0	2nd	1984
4	Calgary Dinos	West: Canada West Champion	23–11–0	5th	1981
WC1	Dalhousie Tigers	Wild-card: AUAA Runner-up	21–10–0	2nd	1979
WC2	Wilfrid Laurier Golden Hawks	Wild-card: OUAA Runner-up	22–5–1	2nd	1983

=== Bracket ===
Regional Finals; March 14–16
1	Moncton	5	7	—
WC2	Wilfrid Laurier	4	3	—
2	York	3	4	7
WC1	Dalhousie	5	3	2
3	Quebec–Trois-Rivières	9	8	—
4	Calgary	5	5	—

Semifinals; March 20–22
1	Moncton	4
4	Alberta	5
2	York	2
3	Quebec–Trois-Rivières	5

Championship; March 23
4	Alberta	5
3	Quebec–Trois-Rivières	2

Note: * denotes overtime period(s)

== Championship final ==
March 23, 1986	#3 Quebec–Trois-Rivières Patriotes	2–5	#4 Alberta Golden Bears	Varsity Arena, Edmonton, Alberta
