= 2024 U Sports University Cup =

Canadian university ice hockey championship

Tournament details
- Venue(s): Mattamy Athletic Centre, Toronto, Ontario
- Dates: March 14–17, 2024
- Teams: 8
- TV partner: CBC Sports

Final positions
- Champions: New Brunswick Reds (10th title)
- Runners-up: Quebec–Trois-Rivières Patriotes
- Third place: McGill Redbirds
- Fourth place: Toronto Metropolitan Bold

Tournament statistics
- Games played: 8

Awards
- MVP: Brady Gilmour (New Brunswick)

The 2024 U Sports University Cup was the 62nd edition of the U Sports men's ice hockey championship, held between March 14 and 17 in Toronto, Ontario, to determine a national champion for the 2023–24 U Sports men's ice hockey season.

The UNB Reds defeated the UQTR Patriotes 4–0 to claim their 10th National Championship. This marked UNB's second title defence – they also won back-to-back championships in 2016 and 2017. Similarly, this was UNB's second consecutive shutout posted in the finals (defeated Alberta 3–0 in 2023) and their fourth shutout in a final overall (2011, 2013, 2023 and 2024).

UNB became the first ever U Sports team to concede no goals at the U Cup and completed the first undefeated season in Canadian collegiate hockey since 1962, going 43–0 (30–0, 5–0, 3–0 plus 5–0 in exhibition play). McMaster Marlins are the only other undefeated championship team, going 12–0–0 on their way to a U Cup title (10–0, 2–0).

== Milestones ==
- With 9 under his tenure, UNB head coach Gardiner MacDougall tied Tom Watt for the most U Cup Championship titles.
- This was Coach MacDougall's 17th appearance at the tournament, setting a new U Cup record.
- This was Coach MacDougall's 12th appearance at the tournament finals, setting a new U Cup record.
- With three games coached at this year's event, Coach MacDougall's set a new tournament record for games coached at 45, surpassing Clare Drake (Alberta) who had 42 games.
- Coach MacDougall extended his career games won at U Cup with 36. Clare Drake (Alberta) and Tom Watt (Toronto) are tied for second with 30 wins each.
- UNB became the first team in the 8-team/3-game tournament format to win all three games via shutout.

== Host ==
The tournament was played at the Mattamy Athletic Centre in the former Maple Leaf Gardens and was hosted by Toronto Metropolitan University (TMU). This was the first time that TMU hosted the tournament, but was the 15th time that the championship was played in Toronto.

The finals were played 27 years to the day of the last University Cup finals played at Maple Leaf Gardens: Guelph Gryphons (OUA Queen's Cup Champions) won 4–3 over the UNB Varsity Reds (AUAA Champions) on March 17, 1997.

== Qualification ==
=== AUS playoffs ===
Quarterfinals; February 14–17
3	St. Francis Xavier	3****	—
6	Acadia	3	2	—
4	Saint Mary’s	4	2*	—
5	Prince Edward Island	3	1	—

Semifinals; February 23–27
1	New Brunswick	4	5	5	—	—
4	Saint Mary’s	1	2	1	—	—
2	Moncton	5	5	4	—	—
3	St. Francis Xavier	3	2	1	—	—

Championship; March 2–5
1	New Brunswick	3	3	—
2	Moncton	1	0	—

Note: * denotes overtime period(s)

=== OUA playoffs ===
Play In; February 11
W6	Wilfrid Laurier	5*
W7	Nipissing	4

Division Quarterfinals; February 14–17
W4	Windsor	3*	7	—
W5	Lakehead	2	2	—
W3	Toronto	4	3	—
W6	Wilfrid Laurier	7	5	—
E4	Queen's	1	3	—
E5	Concordia	3	4*	—
E3	Ottawa	5	8	—
E6	Ontario Tech	1	0	—

Division Semifinals; February 21–25
W1	Brock	6	4	—
W4	Windsor	1	1	—
West
W2	Toronto Metropolitan	4	5	—
W6	Wilfrid Laurier	1	1	—
E1	McGill	6	3	—
E5	Concordia	4	1	—
East
E2	Quebec–Trois-Rivières	4	2	1
E3	Ottawa	1	3*	0

Division Finals; February 28–March 3
W1	Brock	3	1	1
W2	Toronto Metropolitan	1	5	2
E1	McGill	2	5	0
E2	Quebec–Trois-Rivières	4	3	4

Queen's Cup Final; March 9
W2	Toronto Metropolitan	2
E2	Quebec–Trois-Rivières	3**
Bronze Medal Game
W1	Brock	2
E1	McGill	5

Note: * denotes overtime period(s)
Note 1: The Queen's Cup championship game must be held in Ontario (part of the arrangement when the RSEQ hockey league merged with the OUA). When a Quebec-based OUA-East representative is the higher seed and should 'host' the game – the game shall be hosted by the OUA-West team instead, but the OUA-East team shall be the 'home' team and have last change. This rule was applied this season as UQTR had a better record than TMU – thus, TMU would host the game but UQTR would be the 'home' team.

Note 2: The OUA 'Host' rule mentioned in Note 1 now, as of 2019–20, also applies to the bronze medal game. This rule was also applied this season as McGill had a better record than Brock – thus, Brock hosted the game but McGill was the 'home' team.

=== Canada West playoffs ===
Quarterfinal; February 16–18
3	Mount Royal	4	6	—
6	MacEwan	1	4	—
4	Saskatchewan	4	2	4
5	Alberta	2	3	5*

Semifinal; February 22–25
1	British Columbia	1	4	4
5	Alberta	4	2	0
2	Calgary	4	4*	—
3	Mount Royal	2	3	—

Championship; March 1–3
1	British Columbia	2	2	5
2	Calgary	5	1	3

Note: * denotes overtime period(s)

== University Cup Tournament ==
The eight teams advancing to the tournament are listed below. The three (3) conference champions must be seeded 1–3 followed by the OUA runner-up (seed #4). The remaining four seeds are for the AUS Finalist, Canada West Finalist, OUA Third-place and host respectively. Their seedings are based on the pre-tournament rankings. Since TMU would advance as the OUA Runner-up, the loser from the OUA Bronze Medal game (Brock) would represent the host.

=== Participating teams and seeding ===
Seed	Team	Qualified	Record	Last App	Total	Last Win	Total
1	New Brunswick Reds	AUS Champion	30–0–0	2023	22nd	2023	9
2	Quebec–Trois-Rivières Patriotes	OUA Champion	21–7–1	2023	23rd	2022	5
3	British Columbia Thunderbirds	CW Champion	22–4–2	2022	6th	None	0
4	Toronto Metropolitan Bold	OUA Finalist (Host)	19–8–1	2022	2nd	None	0
5	Calgary Dinos	CW Finalist	21–5–2	2023	14th	None	0
6	McGill Redbirds	OUA Bronze	21–5–2	2018	10th	2012	1
7	Moncton Aigles Bleus	AUS Finalist	20–9–1	2012	16th	1995	4
8	Brock Badgers	OUA Semifinalist	21–7–0	2022	4th	None	0

=== Bracket ===
Quarterfinals; March 14–15
1	New Brunswick	4
8	Brock	0
Thursday Mar. 14th
4	Toronto Metropolitan	2**
5	Calgary	1
2	Quebec–Trois-Rivières	5
7	Moncton	1
Friday Mar. 15th
3	British Columbia	2
6	McGill	3

Semifinals; March 16
1	New Brunswick	7
4	Toronto Metropolitan	0
2	Quebec–Trois-Rivières	5
6	McGill	4

Final; March 17
1	New Brunswick	4
2	Quebec–Trois-Rivières	0
Bronze Medal Game
4	Toronto Metropolitan	2
6	McGill	3

Note: * denotes overtime period(s)

== Results ==
=== Quarterfinals ===
March 14, 2024; 1:07 PM	(1) New Brunswick	4 – 0 (2–0, 0–0, 2–0)	(8) Brock	Mattamy Athletic Centre – Toronto, Ontario; Attendance: 600

Game reference

Samuel Richard
Goalies
Connor Ungar
Referees:
Jesse Gour
Danny Emerson
Linesmen:
Nick Arcan
Luke Pye

(Keating) Cody Morgan (1) – 06:01	1–0
(Corbeil, Gilmour) Kade Landry (1) – PP – 17:12	2–0
(Willms) Benjamin Corbeil (1) – 57:02	3–0
(Kammerer) Benjamin Corbeil (2) – EN – 58:07	4–0

4 min
Penalties
10 min
45
Shots
12

March 14, 2024; 7:00 PM	(4) Toronto Metropolitan	2 – 1 (2OT) (1–1, 0–0, 0–0, 0–0, 1–0)	(5) Calgary	Mattamy Athletic Centre – Toronto, Ontario; Attendance: 1,281

Game reference

Kai Edmonds
Goalies
Carl Tetachuk
Referees:
Troy Murray
Josh De Young
Linesmen:
Brian Birkhoff
Maxime Ferland

	0–1	13:11 – PP – Jaeger White (1) (Gutenberg)
(Playfair) Ryan Wells (1) – 30:15	1–1
(Moline, Moberg) Carson Gallagher (1) – 84:31	2–1

8 min
Penalties
2 min
46
Shots
52

March 15, 2024; 1:00 PM	(2) Quebec–Trois-Rivières	5 – 1 (3–0, 2–1, 0–0)	(7) Moncton	Mattamy Athletic Centre – Toronto, Ontario; Attendance: 381

Game reference

Alexis Gravel
Goalies
Olivier Adam
Referees:
Troy Murray
Mark Pearce
Linesmen:
Maxime Ferland
Nick Arcan

(S. Lafrance, Frenette) Charles Beaudoin (1) – 00:55	1–0
(S. Lafrance, F. Lafrance) Kaylen Gauthier (1) – 05:05	2–0
(Gauthier, L'Italien) Simon Lafrance (1) – 11:43	3–0
(S. Lafrance, Frenette) Félix Lafrance (1) – PP – 28:57	4–0
	4–1	29:54 – SH – Jérémy Lapointe (1) (Michel, Pelletier)
(Roy, S. Lafrance) Félix Lafrance (2) – PP – 34:27	5–1

8 min
Penalties
8 min
23
Shots
34

March 15, 2024; 7:07 PM	(3) British Columbia	2 – 3 (1–0, 1–2, 0–1)	(6) McGill	Mattamy Athletic Centre – Toronto, Ontario; Attendance: 1,211

Game reference

Cole Schwebius
Goalies
Alexis Shank
Referees:
Josh Deyoung
Danny Emerson
Linesmen:
Luke Pye
Nick Albinati

(Huo, Mutala) Joshua Williams (1) – 14:31	1–0
	1–1	26:59 – PP – Xavier Fortin (1) (Huard, Gagnon)
	1–2	33:02 – PP – Zach Gallant (1) (Rouleau, Walford)
(Kindree, Williams) Tian Rask (1) – PP – 36:07	2–2
	2–3	48:00 – Stéphane Huard (1) (Frattaroli)

8 min
Penalties
6 min
37
Shots
14

=== Semifinals ===
March 16, 2024; 1:00 PM	(1) New Brunswick	7 – 0 (3–0, 2–0, 2–0)	(8) Toronto Metropolitan	Mattamy Athletic Centre – Toronto, Ontario; Attendance: 1,653

Game reference

Samuel Richard
Goalies
Kai Edmonds
Referees:
Mark Pearce
Jesse Gour
Linesmen:
Nick Arcan
Nick Albinati

(Corbeil) Sean McGurn (1) – 05:04	1–0
(Willms, Gilmour) Kale McCallum (1) – PP – 06:58	2–0
(Gilmour, Morgan) Colton Kammerer (1) – 15:47	3–0
(Willms, Kammerer) Austen Keating (1) – 22:12	4–0
(Gilmour, Keating) Kade Landry (2) – 28:12	5–0
(Nurse) Camaryn Baber (1) – 40:38	6–0
(Kammerer) Jason Wilms (1) – 54:38	7–0

8 min
Penalties
14 min
48
Shots
22

March 16, 2024; 7:07 PM	(2) Quebec–Trois-Rivières	5 – 4 (2–1, 2–3, 1–0)	(6) McGill	Mattamy Athletic Centre – Toronto, Ontario; Attendance: 509

Game reference

Alexis Gravel
Goalies
Alexis Shank
Referees:
Troy Murray
Danny Emerson
Linesmen:
Brian Birkhoff
Maxime Ferland

(F. Lafrance, L'Italien) Simon Lafrance (2) – PP – 08:13	1–0
	1–1	14:14 – SH – Xavier Fortin (2) (Prowse, Huard)
(Rafanomezantsoa, F. Lafrance) Édouard Cournoyer (1) – PP – 17:01	2–1
(Gauthier, L'Italien) William Dumoulin (1) – 27:35	3–1
	3–2	27:56 – Alexandre Gagnon (1) (Gagnon, Fortin)
	3–3	35:07 – Alexandre Gagnon (2) (Prowse, Walford)
	3–4	39:12 – Eric Uba (1) (Rouleau)
(Beaudoin) Vincent Milot-Ouellet (1) – 39:19	4–4
Conor Frenette (1) – 56:19 (S. Lafrance, Noël)	5–4

6 min
Penalties
12 min
28
Shots
29

=== Gold Medal Game ===
March 17, 2024; 5:07 PM (local); CBC Gem	(1) New Brunswick	4 – 0 (2–0, 0–0, 2–0)	(2) Québec à Trois-Rivières	Mattamy Athletic Centre, Toronto, Ontario; Attendance: 1,456

Game reference

Samuel Richard
Goalies
Alexis Gravel
Referees:
Troy Murray
Danny Emerson
Linesmen:
Brian Birkhoff
Maxime Ferland

(Keating) Brady Gilmour (4) – 07:52	1–0
(Keating, Gilmour) Cody Morgan (2) – 15:03	2–0
(McGinley, Morgan) Austen Keating (1) – 44:34	3–0
Isaac Nurse (3) – 59:23	4–0

6 min
Penalties
2 min
33
Shots
23

Game MVPs: Cody Morgan (UNB) & Félix Lauzon (UQTR)

=== Bronze Medal Game ===
March 17, 2024; 11:00 AM	(4) Toronto Metropolitan	2 – 3 (1–1, 0–0, 1–2)	(6) McGill	Mattamy Athletic Centre – Toronto, Ontario; Attendance: 307

Game reference

Kai Edmonds
Goalies
Alexis Shank
Referees:
Mark Pearce
Jesse Gour
Linesmen:
Luke Pye
Nick Albinati

(Portokalis, Wells) Elijah Roberts (1) – 02:30	1–0
	1–1	19:55 – Stéphane Huard (2) (Fortin)
(Playfair, Roberts) Jackson Doherty (1) – 47:52	2–1
	2–2	54:04 – Brandon Frattaroli (1) (Walford, Dumo)
	2–3	58:39 – Brandon Frattaroli (2) (Walford, Prowse)

10 min
Penalties
6 min
26
Shots
31

== Awards ==
The Major W.J. 'Danny' McLeod Award for U Sports University Cup MVP was awarded to UNB forward Brady Gilmour whom finished the tournament tied for first in points with 7 (1G + 6A) along with Simon Lafrance (2G + 5A) of UQTR. His lone goal was the game winner in the Championship Final.

Tournament all-star team were:
Forward: Brady Gilmour (UNB Reds)
Forward: Simon Lafrance (UQTR Patriotes)
Forward: Austen Keating (UNB Reds)
Defenceman: Kale McCallum (UNB Reds)
Defenceman: Scott Walford (McGill Redbirds)
Goaltender: Samuel Richard (UNB Reds)

== Media ==
=== Television ===
All games were broadcast live in English by crews consisting of Damian Smith and Griffin Butler, and Curtis Coleman and Matthew Smith on CBCSports.ca, the CBC Sports app, the CBC Sports YouTube channel and the CBC Gem streaming service. It was broadcast in French by David Brosseau (PxP) and Dylan Baker (Colour) on Radio-Canada and Ici TOU.TV, while the finals also aired on TVA Sports.

=== Entertainment ===
The McGill Fight Band came to support the McGill Redbirds at their three games, providing musical performances in the arena.
