= 2023 U Sports University Cup =

Canadian university ice hockey championship

Tournament details
- Country: Canada
- Venue(s): Eastlink Centre, Charlottetown, Prince Edward Island
- Dates: March 16–19, 2023
- Teams: 8

Final positions
- Champions: New Brunswick Reds (9th title)
- Runners-up: Alberta Golden Bears
- Third place: Quebec–Trois-Rivières Patriotes
- Fourth place: Prince Edward Island Panthers

Tournament statistics
- Games played: 8

Awards
- MVP: Samuel Richard (New Brunswick)

The 2023 U Sports Men's Hockey Championship was the 61st edition of the U Sports men's ice hockey championship, a postseason tournament to determine the national champion of the 2023 U Sports men's ice hockey season. The tournament started on March 16 and ended with the bronze-medal and championship games being played on March 19 in Charlottetown, Prince Edward Island.

The third-seeded UNB Reds defeated the fifth-seeded Alberta Golden Bears by a score of 3–0 to win the program's ninth national championship. In the win, UNB Reds's Coach MacDougall ties Tom Watt for the most championship game appearances, with 11, and ties Clare Drake for the most tournament games coached, with 42 and extends his record for most tournament wins with 34 and tournament appearances with 16.

This is the third shutout in the past 12 years. The previous two shutouts were in 2011 (4–0 UNB over McGill) and 2013 (2–0 UNB over St. Mary's). Prior to that, in 2003, UQTR shutout St. FX 3–0 followed by a 30-year gap to 1973 when Toronto shutout St. Mary's 5–0.

== Host ==
The tournament was held at the Eastlink Centre, on the grounds of University of Prince Edward Island. UPEI was originally scheduled to host the 2021 U Sports University Cup, but that tournament was cancelled due to the COVID-19 pandemic in Canada. This was the second time that UPEI hosted the tournament, having first hosted in the school's inaugural year in 1970.

== Qualification ==
=== AUS playoffs ===
Quarter-finals (Best of 3)
3	UPEI Panthers	1
7	Moncton Aigles Bleus	2
4	St. Francis Xavier X-Men	0
5	Acadia Axemen	2

Semi-finals (Best of 5)
1	UNB Reds	3
6	Moncton Aigles Bleus	1
2	Saint Mary's Huskies	3
5	Acadia Axemen	1

Finals (Best of 3)
1	UNB Reds	2
2	Saint Mary's Huskies	1

With UPEI eliminated in the first round and not advancing to the AUS Finals, a third place team was not required as a replacement 'host' so there was no third-place series.

=== OUA playoffs ===
Division Quarter-finals (Best of 3); OUA Top 12
4E	Carleton Ravens	2
5E	Ontario Tech Ridgebacks	0
3E	McGill Redbirds	2
6E	Ottawa Gee-Gees	0
4W	TMU Bold	1
5W	Toronto Varsity Blues	2
3W	Brock Badgers	2
6W	Laurier Golden Hawks	1

Division Semi-finals (Best of 3); OUA Quarter-Finals
1E	UQTR Patriotes	2
4E	Carleton Ravens	0
2E	Concordia Stingers	2
3E	McGill Redbirds	0
1W	Lakehead Thunderwolves	2
5W	Toronto Varsity Blues	1
2W	Windsor Lancers	2
3W	Brock Badgers	0

Division Finals (Best of 3); OUA Semi-Finals
1E	UQTR Patriotes	2
2E	Concordia Stingers	1
1W	Lakehead Thunderwolves	1
2W	Windsor Lancers	2

Queen's Cup (Single Game); OUA Championship
1E	UQTR Patriotes	3 OT3
2W	Windsor Lancers	2
Third place – Best of 1
2E	Concordia Stingers	4
1W	Lakehead Thunderwolves	0

Note 1: The Queen's Cup championship game must be held in Ontario (part of the arrangement when the RSEQ hockey league merged with the OUA). When a Quebec-based OUA-East representative is the higher seed and should 'host' the game – the game shall be hosted by the OUA-West team instead, but the OUA-East team shall be the 'home' team and have last change. In this case – Windsor hosted UQTR for the Queen's Cup with UQTR as the 'home' team.

Note 2: The OUA 'Host' rule mentioned in Note 1 now, as of 2019–20, also applies to the bronze medal game. In this case Lakehead was the higher seed and the 'natural' host.

Note 3: OUA Playoffs re-seed teams in each round such that the highest advancing seed plays the lowest advancing seed within their divisional bracket.

=== Canada West playoffs ===
Quarter-finals (Best of 3)
4	Mount Royal Cougars	1
5	Saskatchewan Huskies	2
3	UBC Thunderbirds	2
6	Regina Cougars	0

Semi-finals (Best of 3)
1	Calgary Dinos	2
5	Saskatchewan Huskies	1
2	Alberta Golden Bears	2
4	UBC Thunderbirds	1

Finals (Best of 3)
1	Calgary Dinos	2
2	Alberta Golden Bears	1

This was Calgary's first Canada West title since 1996.

== Participating teams ==
Seed	Team	Qualified	Record	Last App	Last Win	Total
1	Calgary Dinos	CW Champion	25–3–0	2011	None	0
2	UQTR Patriotes	OUA Champion	21–4–1	2022	2022	5
3	UNB Reds	AUS Champion	24–4–2	2022	2019	8
4	Windsor Lancers	OUA Finalist	18–6–3	2015	None	0
5	Alberta Golden Bears	CW Finalist	20–5–3	2022	2018	16
6	Concordia Stingers	OUA Bronze	19–7–0	2018	None	0
7	Saint Mary's Huskies	AUS Finalist	20–9–1	2020	2010	1
8	UPEI Panthers	AUS Quarterfinalist (Host)	17–10–3	1991	None	0

== Bracket ==
Quarter-finals
1	Calgary Dinos	2
8	UPEI Panthers	4
Thursday Mar. 16th
4	Windsor Lancers	0
5	Alberta Golden Bears	7
2	UQTR Patriotes	4
7	Saint Mary’s Huskies	1
Friday Mar. 17th
3	UNB Reds	2
6	Concordia Stingers	1

Semi-finals
8	UPEI Panthers	1
5	Alberta Golden Bears	4
2	UQTR Patriotes	3
3	UNB Reds	6

Final
5	Alberta Golden Bears	0
3	UNB Reds	3
3rd place game
8	UPEI Panthers	2
2	UQTR Patriotes	3

== Results ==
=== Quarterfinals ===
March 17, 2023; 7:00 PM	(1) Calgary	2 – 4 (0–2, 1–0, 1–2)	(8) Prince Edward Island	Eastlink Centre – Charlottetown, Prince Edward Island; Attendance: 3,682

Carl Tetachuk
Goalies
Jonah Capriotti
Referees:
Jesse Gour
Jérémie Belliveau
Linesmen:
Ryan Reid
Matt McConnell

	0–1	15:07 – PP – Drake Pilon (1) (Brassard, Maksimovich)
	0–2	18:48 – Andrew Picco (1) (Maksimovich, Candella)
(Gutenberg, Wytinck) Bradley Schoonbaert (3) – PP – 30:26	1–2
	1–3	41:05 – Kaleb Pearson (1)
	1–4	47:06 – Troy Lajeunesse (3) (Shea)
(Joseph) Josh Maser (4) – 58:09	2–4

10 min
Penalties
10 min
22
Shots
31

March 17, 2023; 12:00 PM	(4) Windsor	0 – 7 (0–4, 0–1, 0–2)	(5) Alberta	Eastlink Centre – Charlottetown, Prince Edward Island; Attendance: 3,191

Nathan Torchia
Goalies
Ethan Kruger
Referees:
Mike Langin
Tanner Doiron
Linesmen:
Brian Birkhoff
Sean Hagen

0–1	00:38 – Nolan Volcan (1) (Sakowich, Preziuso)
0–2	01:52 – PP – Eric Florchuk (1) (Davidson, Preziuso)
0–3	04:06 – PP – Tyler Preziuso (1)
0–4	04:18 – PP – Tyler Preziuso (2) (Florchuk, Hall)
0–5	21:51 – Jakin Smallwood (1)
0–6	41:50 – PP – Curtis Trolley (1) (Hughes, Smallwood)
0–7	52:04 – PP – Tyler Preziuso (3) (Florchuk)

21 min
Penalties
8 min
26
Shots
27

March 16, 2023; 12:00 PM	(2) Québec à Trois-Rivières	4 – 1 (0–1, 2–0, 2–0)	(7) Saint Mary’s	Eastlink Centre – Charlottetown, Prince Edward Island

Alexis Gravel
Goalies
Jeremy Helvig
Referees:
Tanner Doiron
Mike Langin
Linesmen:
Brian Birkhoff
Ryan Reid

	0–1	04:42 – Nathan Dunkley (3) (Getson)
(Bergeron) Olivier Garneau (1) – 20:29	1–1
(Frenette, L'Italien) David Noël (1) – PP – 29:36	2–1
(Bergeron, Boivin) Félix Lafrance (3) – 45:47	3–1
(Frenette) Zachary Lavigne (3) – EN – 58:26	4–1

4 min
Penalties
4 min
29
Shots
26

March 16, 2023; 7:00 PM	(3) New Brunswick	2 – 1 (1–0, 0–1, 1–0)	(6) Concordia	Eastlink Centre – Charlottetown, Prince Edward Island; Attendance: 2,345

Samuel Richard
Goalies
Jonathan Lemieux
Referees:
Tyson Stewart
Jesse Gour
Linesmen:
Matt McConnell
Sean Hagen

(Willms, Keating) Cody Morgan (1) – 10:06	1–0
	1–1	35:20 – PP – Phélix Martineau (6) (Tremblay, Larochelle)
(Petizian) Simon Pinard (5) – 44:58	2–1

2 min
Penalties
4 min
14
Shots
25

=== Semifinals ===
March 18, 2023; 7:00 PM	(5) Alberta	4 – 1 (1–0, 2–0, 1–1)	(8) Prince Edward Island	Eastlink Centre – Charlottetown, Prince Edward Island; Attendance: 3,820

Ethan Kruger
Matt Berlin
Goalies
Jonah Capriotti
Referees:
Jérémie Belliveau
Mike Langin
Linesmen:
Sean Hagen
Jarrod MacAdam

(Fonteyne, Platz) Eric Florchuk (2) – 00:23	1–0
(Davidson, Prokop) Matt Fonteyne (1) – PP – 21:46	2–0
Nolan Volcan (2) – 37:11	3–0
(Volcan) Tyler Preziuso (4) – 52:59	4–0
	4–1	57:11 – Conor Maceachern (1) (Maksimovich, Brassard)

8 min
Penalties
42 min
24
Shots
23

March 18, 2023; 1:00 PM	(2) Québec à Trois-Rivières	3 – 6 (0–2, 1–2, 2–2)	(3) New Brunswick	Eastlink Centre – Charlottetown, Prince Edward Island; Attendance: 1,830

Alexis Gravel
Goalies
Samuel Richard
Referees:
Tanner Doiron
Tyson Stewart
Linesmen:
Matt McConnell
Brian Birkoff

	0–1	00:16 – Jason Willms (4) (Nurse, Carroll)
	0–2	18:25 – PP – Benjamin Corbeil (1) (Gilmour, MacDougall)
(Tessier, Bergeron) Simon Lafrance (2) – PP – 25:22	1–2
	1–3	27:25 – Cole MacKay (1) (Baber, MacDougall)
	1–4	04:18 – PP – Emmett Sproule (1) (MacDougall)
	1–5	51:59 – Isaac Nurse (1) (MacKay)
Justin Bergeron (1) – 54:34	2–5
(Bergeron) Félix Lafrance (4) – EA – 58:31	3–5
	3–6	58:45 – EN – Isaac Nurse (2) (Keating)

8 min
Penalties
10 min
19
Shots
34

=== Gold Medal Game ===
March 19, 2023; 7:00 PM (local); CBC Gem	(3) New Brunswick	3–0 (0–0, 1–0, 2–0)	(5) Alberta	Eastlink Centre, Charlottetown, Prince Edward Island; Attendance: 2,712

Game reference

Samuel Richard
Goalies
Ethan Kruger
Referees:
Mike Langin
Jesse Gour
Linesmen:
Matt McConnell
Brian Birkhoff

(Baber) Cody Morgan (2) – 33:17	1–0
(Nurse) Cole Mackay (2) – 54:30	2–0
(Morgan, Baber) Austen Keating (2) – 55:52	3–0

0 min
Penalties
0 min
32
Shots
17

Game MVPs: Cody Morgan (UNB) & Dawson Davidson (ALB)

=== Bronze Medal Game ===
March 19, 2023; 1:00 PM	(2) Québec à Trois-Rivières	3–2 (2–0, 1–2, 0–0)	(8) Prince Edward Island	Eastlink Centre, Charlottetown, Prince Edward Island; Attendance: 1,943

Alexis Gravel
Goalies
Jonah Capriotti
Referees:
Jérémie Belliveau
Tyson Stewart
Linesmen:
Sean Hagen
Jarrod MacAdam

(L'Italien, Frenette) David Noël (2) – 06:33	1–0
(Pellerin, Lepage) Mathieu Boucher (2) – 08:16	2–0
	2–1	22:20 – Kaleb Pearson (2) (MacKinnon, Beauregard)
	2–2	35:40 – Ian Smallwood (1) (Pearson)
(L'Italien, Boucher) Vincent Milot-Ouellet (1) – 39:05	3–2

18 min
Penalties
10 min
23
Shots
24

Game MVPs: Samuel L'Italien (UQTR) & Kaleb Pearson (UPEI)

== Awards ==
Samuel Richard, a goaltender from the UNB Reds, was selected as the Major W.J. 'Danny' McLeod Award for U Sports University Cup MVP. Richard played all three games for UNB and finished the tournament with a GAA of 1.33 and Save Percentage of 0.920 as well as a shutout in the championship final.

Tournament all-star team were:
Forward: Matt Fonteyne (Alberta Golden Bears)
Forward: Jason Willms (UNB Reds)
Forward: Michael Petizian (UNB Reds)
Defenceman: Ross MacDougall (UNB Reds)
Defenceman: Justin Bergeron (UQTR Patriotes )
