= 2022 U Sports University Cup =

Tournament details
- Venue(s): Andrew H. McCain Arena, Wolfville, Nova Scotia
- Dates: March 31 – April 3, 2022
- Teams: 8

Final positions
- Champions: Quebec–Trois-Rivières Patriotes (5th title)
- Runners-up: Alberta Golden Bears
- Third place: St. Francis Xavier X-Men
- Fourth place: Ryerson Rams

Tournament statistics
- Games played: 8

Awards
- MVP: Alexis Gravel (Quebec–Trois-Rivières)

The 2022 U Sports Men's University Cup Hockey Tournament (60th Annual) was held March 31 – April 3, 2022, in Wolfville, Nova Scotia, to determine a national champion for the 2021–22 U Sports men's ice hockey season. The OUA Champion UQTR Patriotes defeated the Canada West Champion, and top-seeded, Alberta Golden Bears by a score of 5–4 in double overtime.

== Host ==
The tournament was played at Andrew H. McCain Arena on the campus of Acadia University. It was the first full tournament hosted by Acadia following the partially-played, cancelled championship in 2020. This is scheduled to be the first U Sports men's ice hockey championship played since 2019 following two years of cancelled tournaments due to the COVID-19 pandemic in Canada. The tournament was originally scheduled to be played in Halifax, Nova Scotia at the Scotiabank Centre, but was moved to the Acadia University campus due to scheduling conflicts following a postponement of this tournament by two weeks.

== Participating teams ==
| Seed | Team | Qualified | Record | Last | Total |
|---|---|---|---|---|---|
| 1 | Alberta Golden Bears | Canada West Champion | 16–3–1 | 2018 | 16 |
| 2 | UNB Reds | AUS Champion | 21–3–0 | 2019 | 8 |
| 3 | UQTR Patriotes | OUA Champion | 10–3–2 | 2003 | 4 |
| 4 | Brock Badgers | OUA Finalist | 7–5–2 | None | 0 |
| 5 | St. Francis Xavier X-Men | AUS Finalist | 17–5–1 | 2004 | 1 |
| 6 | UBC Thunderbirds | Canada West Finalist | 14–15–1 | None | 0 |
| 7 | Ryerson Rams | OUA Bronze | 11–4–0 | None | 0 |
| 8 | Acadia Axemen | Lost play-in game (Host) | 7–14–1 | 1996 | 2 |

== Championship bracket ==
Quarter-Finals
1 | Alberta Golden Bears | 7
8 | Acadia Axemen | 0
Thursday Mar. 31st
4 | Brock Badgers | 0
5 | St. Francis Xavier X-Men | 3
2 | UNB Reds | 1
7 | Ryerson Rams | 2
Friday Apr. 1st
3 | UQTR Patriotes | 2**
6 | UBC Thunderbirds | 1

Semi-Finals: April 2
1 | Alberta Golden Bears | 7
5 | St. Francis Xavier X-Men | 3
3 | UQTR Patriotes | 7
7 | Ryerson Rams | 2

Gold Medal Game: April 3
1 | Alberta Golden Bears | 4
3 | UQTR Patriotes | 5**
Bronze Medal Game
5 | St. Francis Xavier X-Men | 3*
7 | Ryerson Rams | 2

Note: * denotes overtime period(s)

== Results ==
=== Quarterfinals ===
| March 31, 2022; 2:30 PM | (1) Alberta | 7 – 0 (3–0, 0–0, 4–0) | (8) Acadia | Andrew H. McCain Arena – Wolfville, Nova Scotia; Attendance: 2,100 |

Taz Burman
Goalies
Max Paddock
Conor McCollum
Referees:
Jonathan Langille
Josh Shein
Linesmen:
John MacDonnell
Jarrod MacAdam

| (Plouffe, Lakusta) Eric Florchuk (2) – 07:54 | 1–0 |
| (Plouffe, Lakusta) Daneel Lategan (1) – 10:36 | 2–0 |
| (McLeod, Freadrich) Gary Haden (2) – 19:16 | 3–0 |
| (Savenkov) Clayton Kirichenko (1) – 40:54 | 4–0 |
| Grayson Pawlenchuk (2) – 43:37 | 5–0 |
| (Kirichenko, Hughes) Nolan Volcan (2) – 51:35 | 6–0 |
| (Pawlenchuk) Josh Paterson (2) | 7–0 |

6 min
Penalties
6 min
34
Shots
29

| March 31, 2022; 1:00 PM | (4) Brock | 0 – 3 (0–1, 0–1, 0–1) | (5) St. Francis Xavier | Andrew H. McCain Arena – Wolfville, Nova Scotia; Attendance: 1,231 |

Mario Peccia
Goalies
Joseph Raaymakers
Referees:
Lucas Martin
Korey Bannerman
Linesmen:
Kevin Fisher
Jason Bartlett

| 0–1 | 13:27 – PP – Santino Centorame (1) (Struthers, Trott) |
| 0–2 | 39:07 – Matthew Struthers (3) (Philip, Hawel) |
| 0–3 | 56:39 – Matthew Struthers (4) (Pointer, Darby) |

26 min
Penalties
15 min
35
Shots
32

| April 1, 2022; 1:00 PM | (2) New Brunswick | 1 – 2 (0–1, 0–1, 1–0) | (7) Ryerson | Andrew H. McCain Arena – Wolfville, Nova Scotia; Attendance: 1,214 |

Rylan Parenteau
Goalies
Garrett Forrest
Referees:
Mark Pearce
Korey Bannerman
Linesmen:
Kevin Fisher
Sam Currie

| | 0–1 | 00:17 – Kevin Gursoy (3) (Miller) |
| | 0–2 | 21:40 – PP – Domenico Commisso (2) (Shankar) |
| (Roth) Samuel Dove-McFalls (3) – 47:35 | 1–2 |

4 min
Penalties
4 min
37
Shots
18

| April 1, 2022; 7:00 PM | (3) Québec à Trois-Rivières | 2 – 1 (2OT) (1–0, 0–1, 0–0, 0–0, 1–0) | (6) British Columbia | Andrew H. McCain Arena – Wolfville, Nova Scotia; Attendance: 1,312 |

Alexis Gravel
Goalies
Rylan Toth
Referees:
Jonathan Langille
Lucas Martin
Linesmen:
John MacDonnell
Jason Bartlett

| (Boucher, Martel) Félix Boivin (2) – PP – 19:59 | 1–0 |
| | 1–1 | 30:04 – Cyle McNabb (1) |
| (Lafrance) Félix Lauzon (1) – 91:50 | 2–1 |

4 min
Penalties
12 min
52
Shots
38

=== Semifinals ===
| April 2, 2022; 1:00 PM | (1) Alberta | 7 – 3 (1–1, 3–0, 3–2) | (8) St. Francis Xavier | Andrew H. McCain Arena – Wolfville, Nova Scotia; Attendance: 1,931 |

Taz Burman
Goalies
Joseph Raaymakers
Referees:
Jonathan Langille
Josh Shein
Linesmen:
Sam Curry
John MacDonnell

| | 0–1 | 12:44 – Matthew Struthers (5) |
| (Haden, Prokop) Jared Freadrich (1) – PP – 18:34 | 1–1 |
| (Davidson, Freadrich) Eric Florchuk (4) – PP – 21:34 | 2–1 |
| (McLeod, Freadrich) Josh Prokop (4) – 32:41 | 3–1 |
| (Prokop, Freadrich) Eric Florchuk (4) – 37:11 | 4–1 |
| | 4–2 | 45:29 – Matthew Philip (2) (Hawel, Centorame) |
| (Pawlenchuk, Preziuso) Dawson Davidson (1) – 43:37 | 5–2 |
| Noah Philp (4) – 52:59 | 6–2 |
| | 6–3 | 54:58 – PP – Zack Trott (1) (Hawel) |
| (Pawlenchuk) Gary Haden (3) | 7–3 |

22 min
Penalties
8 min
28
Shots
35

| April 2, 2022; 7:30 PM | (3) Québec à Trois-Rivières | 7 – 2 (2–1, 2–1, 3–0) | (7) Ryerson | Andrew H. McCain Arena – Wolfville, Nova Scotia; Attendance: 1,053 |

Alexis Gravel
Goalies
Garrett Forrest
Referees:
Lucas Martin
Mark Pearce
Linesmen:
Kevin Fisher
Jarrod Acadam

| Justin Bergeron (1) – 10:48 | 1–0 |
| | 1–1 | 15:05 – PP – Jeremiah Addison (2) (Shankar, Hyman) |
| (Lauzon, Lafrance) Olivier Garneau (1) – 15:46 | 2–1 |
| (Garneau, Lafrance) Julien Tessier (1) – 24:07 | 3–1 |
| | 3–2 | 39:07 – Chris Playfair (2) (Gursoy) |
| (Boucher, Milot-Ouellet) David Noël (1) – 26:33 | 4–2 |
| (Boivin) Félix Lauzon (2) – 45:40 | 5–2 |
| (Boucher, Lafrance) Jordan Martel (2) – PP – 52:14 | 6–2 |
| (Filip Côté, Milot-Ouelle) Samuel Hould (1) – PP – 55:40 | 7–2 |

10 min
Penalties
12 min
43
Shots
31

=== Gold Medal Game ===
| April 3, 2022; 7:30 PM | (1) Alberta | 4 – 5 (2OT) (2–1, 2–1, 0–2, 0–0, 0–1) | (3) Québec à Trois-Rivières | Andrew H. McCain Arena – Wolfville, Nova Scotia; Attendance: 1,742 |

Taz Burman
Goalies
Alexis Gravel
Referees:
Jonathan Langille
Mark Pearce
Linesmen:
John MacDonnell
Kevin Fisher

| (Pawlenchuk, Davidson) Matt Fonteyne (4) – 07:57 | 1–0 |
| (Philp, Freadrich) Luc Smith (6) – PP – 11:31 | 2–0 |
| | 2–1 | 11:33 – Jordan Martel (3) |
| (Fonteyne, Kirichenko) Noah Philp (5) – 20:45 | 3–1 |
| | 3–2 | 45:29 – Félix Lauzon (3) (Lafrance, Martel) |
| (Fonteyne) Noah Philp (6) – 31:46 | 4–2 |
| | 4–3 | 48:46 – Loik Léveillé (1) (Hould, Lauzon) |
| | 4–4 | 52:47 – PP – Simon Lafrance (6) (Boucher, Léveillé) |
| | 4–5 | 94:18 – Simon Lafrance (7) |

4 min
Penalties
8 min
70
Shots
40

=== Bronze Medal Game ===
| April 3, 2022; 1:00 PM | (5) St. Francis Xavier | 3 – 2 (OT) (1–1, 0–1, 1–0, 1–0) | (7) Ryerson | Andrew H. McCain Arena – Wolfville, Nova Scotia; Attendance: 1,493 |

Joseph Raaymakers
Goalies
Garrett Forrest
Referees:
Lucas Martin
Corey Bannerman
Linesmen:
Sam Currie
Jarrod McAdam

| | 0–1 | 12:34 – Jeremiah Addison (3) (Doherty, Commisso) |
| (Roberts) Brendon Clavelle (1) – 17:36 | 1–1 |
| | 1–2 | 30:58 – Kevin Gursoy (4) (Roberts, Bollers) |
| (Smith) Conner Bruggen-Cate (1) – 36:50 | 2–2 |
| (Hawel, Nelson) Zack Trott (2) – 60:43 | 3–2 |

25 min
Penalties
16 min
40
Shots
31

== Tournament All-Stars ==
Alexis Gravel, a goaltender from the UQTR Patriotes, was selected as the Major W.J. 'Danny' McLeod Award for U Sports University Cup MVP. Gravel played all three games for UQTR (two of which went into overtime) and finished the tournament with a GAA of 1.86 and Save Percentage of .950 as well as Player of the Game honours in UQTR's first game vs UBC.

Joining Gravel on the tournament all-star team were:
Defenceman: Clayton Kirichenko (Alberta Golden Bears)
Defenceman: Santino Centorame, (StFX)
Forward: Simon Lafrance (UQTR Patriotes)
Forward: Eric Florchuk (Alberta Golden Bears)
Forward: Félix Lauzon (UQTR Patriotes)
