= 2009 CIS University Cup =

Canadian hockey tournament

2009 Cavendish CIS University Cup presented by TBay Tel

Tournament details
- Venue(s): Fort William Gardens, Thunder Bay, Ontario
- Dates: March 25–29, 2009
- Teams: 6

Final positions
- Champions: New Brunswick Varsity Reds (3rd title)
- Runners-up: Western Ontario Mustangs

Tournament statistics
- Games played: 7
- Attendance: 17,880 (2,554 per game)

Awards
- MVP: Lachlan MacIntosh (New Brunswick)

The 2009 CIS Men's University Cup Hockey Tournament (47th Annual) was held March 26–29, 2009. It was the first year of a two-year CIS Championship bid by Lakehead University and was hosted at Fort William Gardens hockey rink.

Similar to previous years, going back to the introduction of the expanded format in 1998, the six invited teams were split into two pools of three in which each team played the other (two games total). The best team in each pool advanced to the final. All pool games had to be decided by a win; there were no ties. If a pool had a three-way tie for 1st (all teams had 1–1 records) than goals for/goals against differential among the tied teams was the first tie-breaker.

The UNB Varsity Reds advanced to the finals for the third straight year and won their second title in two years, having won in 2007 in Moncton.

== Road to the Cup ==
=== AUS playoffs ===
Quarterfinals
3	Moncton	8	1	4
6	Prince Edward Island	4	3	3
4	St. Francis Xavier	4	2	—
5	Acadia	5	4	—

Semifinals
1	New Brunswick	5	1	3	—	—
5	Acadia	2	0	2	—	—
2	Saint Mary’s	5	0	4	4	—
3	Moncton	4	2	3	3	—

Championship
1	New Brunswick	5	2	1
2	Saint Mary’s	1	3	5

Note: * denotes overtime period(s)

=== OUA playoffs ===
Division Quarterfinals; February 18–22
E3	McGill	5	2	2
E6	Ottawa	1	3	1
E4	Concordia	6	1	2
E5	Carleton	3	2	3
W3	Western Ontario	4*	1	4
W6	Guelph	3	2*	1
W4	Waterloo	4	2	—
W5	Lakehead	5*	6	—

Division Semifinals; February 25–March 1
E1	Quebec–Trois-Rivières	2	2	5**
E5	Carleton	4	1	4
East
E2	Toronto	2	3	—
E3	McGill	3	6	—
W1	Wilfrid Laurier	3	3*	4
W5	Lakehead	4*	2	3
West
W2	York	2	2	—
W3	Western Ontario	4	3	—

Division Finals; March 4–7
E1	Quebec–Trois-Rivières	1	1	—
E3	McGill	3	2	—
W1	Wilfrid Laurier	3	2	—
W3	Western Ontario	4	3	—

Queen's Cup Final; March 14
E3	McGill	1
W3	Western Ontario	2

Note: * denotes overtime period(s)

=== Canada West playoffs ===
Quarterfinal
3	Manitoba	2	0	—
6	Regina	3	1	—
4	Lethbridge	4	3*	3
5	British Columbia	5*	2	4*

Semifinal
1	Alberta	1	4	7
6	Regina	5	1	1
2	Saskatchewan	5	4	—
5	British Columbia	3	2	—

Championship
1	Alberta	5	7	—
2	Saskatchewan	2	0	—

Note: * denotes overtime period(s)

== University Cup ==
The six teams that advanced to the tournament are listed below. The wild-card team was selected from the AUS Conference as the CW was provided the wild-card in 2008 and OUA teams were ineligible as they were the host conference. With Lakehead losing in the first round of the playoffs, they were a natural 'host' and are the 6th seed.

Ranking was based on the last Top 10 media release for the season, February 17, well before the end of the playoffs. The Ranking Committee provided the Tournament Committee with a 6-team mini-ranking prior to the tournament, which was then used for seeding. As this was not a 'formal' Top 10, it was not released to the media leaving the February 17 ranking as the last and most recent Top 10.

Rank	Seed	Team	Qualification	Record	Appearance	Last
2	1	Alberta Golden Bears	West: Canada West Champion	26–5–2	33rd	2008
4	2	Saint Mary's Huskies	Atlantic: AUS Champion	25–9–1	10th	2002
6	3	Western Ontario Mustangs	Ontario: OUA Champion	24–9–0	9th	2005
1	4	New Brunswick Varsity Reds	Wild-card: AUS Runner-up	25–6–3	11th	2008
NR	5	McGill Redmen	Quebec: OUA Runner-up	24–11–1	3rd	2008
10	6	Lakehead Thunderwolves	Host	21–11–1	4th	2006

=== Pool A – Evening ===
Seed	Team	Qualified
1	Alberta Golden Bears	Canada West Champion
4	UNB Varsity Reds	Wild-Card – AUS Finalist
6	Lakehead Thunderwolves	Host

Day	Game	Home	Visitor	Score
Thursday	2	#4 UNB Varsity Reds	#1 Alberta Golden Bears	6–3
Friday	4	#1 Alberta Golden Bears	#6 Lakehead Thunderwolves	2–1
Saturday	6	#6 Lakehead Thunderwolves	#4 UNB Varsity Reds	1–3

Team	GP	W	L	GF	GA	DIF	PTS
UNB Varsity Reds	2	2	0	9	4	+5	4
Alberta Golden Bears	2	1	1	5	7	−2	2
Lakehead Thunderwolves	2	0	2	2	5	−3	0

=== Pool B – Afternoon ===
Seed	Team	Qualified
2	Saint Mary's Huskies	AUS Champion
3	Western Mustangs	OUA-West and Queen's Cup Champion
5	McGill Redmen	OUA-East Champion and Queen's Cup Finalist

Day	Game	Home	Visitor	Score
Thursday	1	#5 McGill Redmen	#2 Saint Mary's Huskies	1–4
Friday	3	#3 Western Mustangs	#5 McGill Redmen	3–4
Saturday	5	#2 Saint Mary's Huskies	#3 Western Mustangs	2–7

Team	GP	W	L	GF	GA	DIF	PTS
Western Mustangs	2	1	1	10	6	+4	2
Saint Mary's Huskies	2	1	1	6	8	−2	2
McGill Redmen	2	1	1	5	7	−2	2

Note: The Western Mustangs were the second team in the expanded 6-team format, to advance to the championship final with a 1–1 record. The Alberta Golden Bears were the first team to advanced to the finals with a 1–1 record, which occurred the previous season in Moncton.

== Championship final ==
Bench assignments were based on each advancing team's 2 pool games, not their tournament seed. UNB was assigned the home bench based on their record of 2–0 versus Western at 1–1.

March 29, 2009; 7:00 PM (EST); Rogers Sportsnet	#4 UNB Varsity Reds (H)	4–2 (1–0, 1–1, 2–1)	#3 Western Mustangs (V)	Fort William Gardens, Thunder Bay; Attendance: 2,715

Game reference

Travis Fullerton (3–0–0)
Goalies
Brad Topping (1–2–0)
Referee:
Derek Zalaski
Linesmen:
Nigel Black
Matt Traub

L. MacIntosh (unassisted) – 18:58	1–0
J-S. Dickson (D. Bowman, J. Harty) – 21:02	2–0
	2–1	28:57 – P. Ouellet (J. McCann)
	2–2	41:13 – K. Baker (J. Martens, J. Furlong)
L. MacIntosh (K. Bailey, J. Cuddihy) 50:24	3–2
L. MacIntosh (K. Bailey) 59:14 EN	4–2

4 for 8 min
Penalties
3 for 6 min
(10, 10, 17) – 37
Shots
30 – (1, 18, 11)

== Tournament All-Stars ==
Lachlan MacIntosh, a forward from the UNB Varsity Reds, was selected as the Major W.J. 'Danny' McLeod Award for CIS University Cup MVP. He had a hat-trick in the Gold Medal final to finish with five goals and one assist for six points, tying for the tournament lead with teammate Kyle Baily's one goal and five assists, and was UNB's Game MVP in the finals as well as in their tournament opener versus Alberta on Thursday.

Joining MacIntosh on the tournament all-star team were:

- Goaltender: Travis Fullerton, UNB Varsity Reds
- Defenseman: Dustin Friesen, UNB Varsity Reds
- Defenseman: Chris Petrow, Western Mustangs
- Forward: Kyle Bailey, UNB Varsity Reds
- Forward: Joe McCann, Western Mustangs
