= 2018 U Sports University Cup =

Canadian university ice hockey championship

Tournament details
- Venue(s): Aitken Centre, Fredericton, New Brunswick
- Dates: March 15–18, 2018
- Teams: 8

Final positions
- Champions: Alberta Golden Bears (16th title)
- Runners-up: St. Francis Xavier X-Men
- Third place: New Brunswick Varsity Reds
- Fourth place: Saskatchewan Huskies

Tournament statistics
- Games played: 8
- Attendance: 24,000 (3,000 per game)

Awards
- MVP: Stephen Legault (Alberta)

The 2018 U Sports Men's University Cup Hockey Tournament (56th Annual) was held March 15–18, 2018, in Fredericton, New Brunswick, Canada, and played at the Aitken Centre on the University of New Brunswick's Fredericton campus. This event marked the second year of a successful two-year bid to host the 2017 and 2018 U Sports University Cup. This was the third time UNB hosted the University Cup – they first hosted a two-year bid in 2003 & 2004 and again in 2011 & 2012. UNB is the first program to host the event three times since the expanded format was introduced in 1998.

The Alberta Golden Bears won their 16th title over the St. Francis Xavier X-Men. Alberta last won the University Cup in 2015. St. F.X. was last in the final in 2016 when they lost to UNB Varsity Reds in the finals.

It was announced a month prior to the tournament, that the next two tournaments would be 'singles', first hosted by Lethbridge Pronghorns (2019/U Cup 57 – ENMAX Centre) followed by Acadia Axemen (2020/U Cup 58 – Scotiabank Centre). The tournament format would remain unchanged for both years.

== Road to the Cup ==
=== AUS playoffs ===
Quarter-finals (Best of 3)
4	Saint Mary's Huskies	2
5	UPEI Panthers	1
3	Acadia Axemen	2
6	Dalhousie University	0

Semi-finals (Best of 5)
1	UNB Varsity Reds	3
4	Saint Mary's Huskies	0
2	St. Francis Xavier X-Men	3
3	Acadia Axemen	2

AUS Championship (Best of 3)
1	UNB Varsity Reds	2
2	St. Francis Xavier X-Men	0
Third place
3	Acadia Axemen	2
4	Saint Mary's Huskies	1

=== OUA playoffs ===
Division Quarter-finals (Best of 3); OUA Sweet 16
1E	McGill Redmen	2
8E	Laurentian Voyageurs	0
4E	Carleton Ravens	1
5E	Ottawa Gee Gees	2
2E	Queen's Golden Gaels	2
7E	Nipissing Lakers	0
3E	Concordia Stingers	2
6E	UOIT Ridgebacks	0
1W	Guelph Gryphons	2
8W	Windsor Lancers	1
4W	Laurier Golden Hawks	0
5W	Brock Badgers	2
2W	York Lions	2
7W	Lakehead Thunderwolves	1
3W	Ryerson Rams	2
6W	Western Mustangs	1

Division Semi-finals (Best of 3); OUA Quarter-Finals
1E	McGill Redmen	2
5E	Ottawa Gee Gees	1
2E	Queen's Golden Gaels	1
3E	Concordia Stingers	2
1W	Guelph Gryphons	0
5W	Brock Badgers	2
2W	York Lions	2
3W	Ryerson Rams	0

Division Finals (Best of 3); OUA Semi-Finals
1E	McGill Redmen	2
3E	Concordia Stingers	1
2W	York Lions	1
5W	Brock Badgers	2

Queen's Cup (Single Game); OUA Championship
1E	McGill Redmen	5
5W	Brock Badgers (Host)	1
Third place
3E	Concordia Stingers (H)	3
2W	York Lions (V)	2

Note 1: UQTR forfeit their first 13 games due to an ineligible player, resulting in the loss of eight(8) wins. Their record of 15–6–1, at the time of the January announcement, was correct to 7–14–1. They finished with a record of 8–19–1 (17 points for 10th).

Note 2: The Queen's Cup championship game must be held in Ontario (part of the arrangement when the RSEQ hockey league merged with the OUA). When a Quebec-based OUA-East representative is the higher seed and should 'host' the game – the game shall be hosted by the OUA-West team instead, but the OUA-East team shall be the 'home' team and have last change.

=== Canada West playoffs ===
Quarter-finals (Best of 3)
3	Manitoba Bison	0
6	Mount Royal Cougars	2
4	UBC Thunderbirds	1
5	Calgary Dinos	2

Semi-finals (Best of 3)
1	Alberta Golden Bears	2
6	Mount Royal Cougars	0
2	Saskatchewan Huskies	2
5	Calgary Dinos	1

Canada West Championship (Best of 3)
1	Alberta Golden Bears	2
2	Saskatchewan Huskies	0

== University Cup tournament ==
The eight teams to advance to the tournament are listed below. The three(3) conference champions must be seeded 1–3 based on the pre-tournament Top 10 Rankings followed by the OUA Runner-up (seed #4). The remaining four seeds are for the AUS Finalist, Canada West Finalist, OUA Third-place and host. Their seedings are based on the pre-tournament rankings.

Since UNB advancing as the AUS Champion, Acadia – as the AUS 3rd-place finisher (AUS Bronze), would take the place of the 'host'. To avoid a first round all-conference matchup between UNB and Acadia, Acadia #8 and Concordia #7 swapped seeds.

Rank	Seed	Team	Qualified
1	1	UNB Varsity Reds	AUS Champion / Host
2	2	Alberta Golden Bears	Canada West Champion
5	3	McGill Redmen	OUA Champion
6	4	Brock Badgers	OUA Finalist
3	5	St. Francis Xavier X-Men	AUS Finalist
4	6	Saskatchewan Huskies	Canada West Finalist
7	7	Acadia Axemen	(AUS Bronze)
8	8	Concordia Stingers	OUA Bronze

=== Tournament format ===
The tournament is a traditional 8 team, single elimination ladder with bronze medal game between the two semi-final losers. Games that are tied after regulation play a 10-minute overtime period following the 3rd period. If there is no score after the first overtime, the ice is cleaned and they would play 20 minute periods (with ice cleaned between periods) until there is a winner.

The higher seed is the 'Home' team for each game (the home team must wear their 'white' jerseys and will get the last change during stoppages of play).

Quarter-finals (Single Game)
4	Brock Badgers	2
5	St. Francis Xavier X-Men	6
Thursday
1	UNB Varsity Reds	8
8	Concordia Stingers	1
2	Alberta Golden Bears	8
7	Acadia Axemen	6
Friday
3	McGill Redmen	1
6	Saskatchewan Huskies	4

Semi-finals (Single Game)
5	St. Francis Xavier X-Men	5 OT1
1	UNB Varsity Reds	4
2	Alberta Golden Bears	3 OT1
6	Saskatchewan Huskies	2

Championship final (Single Game)
5	St. Francis Xavier X-Men	2
2	Alberta Golden Bears	4
Bronze Medal (Single Game)
1	UNB Varsity Reds	5 OT1
6	Saskatchewan Huskies	4

== Tournament All-Stars ==
Stephan Legault, from the Alberta Golden Bears, was selected as the Major W.J. 'Danny' McLeod Award for U Sports University Cup MVP. Stephan had two goals and five assists for seven points in three games.

Joining Legault on the tournament all-star team were:
Forward: Mark Simpson (UNB Varsity Reds)
Forward: Michael Clarke (St. Francis Xavier X-Men)
Defenceman: Jagger Dirk (St. Francis Xavier X-Men)
Defenceman: Kendall McFaull (Saskatchewan Huskies)
Goalie: Zach Sawchenko (Alberta Golden Bears)

== See also ==
2018 U Sports Women's Ice Hockey Championship
