= 2019 U Sports University Cup =

Canadian university ice hockey championship

Tournament details
- Venue(s): ENMAX Centre, Lethbridge, Alberta
- Dates: March 14–17, 2019
- Teams: 8

Final positions
- Champions: New Brunswick Reds (8th title)
- Runners-up: Alberta Golden Bears
- Third place: St. Francis Xavier X-Men
- Fourth place: Saskatchewan Huskies

Tournament statistics
- Games played: 8
- Attendance: 11,416 (1,427 per game)

Awards
- MVP: Alex Dubeau (New Brunswick)

The 2019 U Sports University Cup hockey tournament (57th annual) was held March 14–17, 2019, in Lethbridge, Alberta, to determine a national champion for the 2018–19 U Sports men's ice hockey season. The event was hosted by the Lethbridge Pronghorns, a member of U Sports Canada West conference, and played at the ENMAX Centre. The ENMAX center is located 15 minutes from campus, in south Lethbridge. This event marks the first appearance of the tournament in Lethbridge and 10th time in Alberta (Seven times in Edmonton and twice in Calgary).

The UNB Reds won their eighth title over the defending champion Alberta Golden Bears. UNB last won the University Cup in 2017. This marked only the second victory for an Atlantic program in 10 trips to Alberta (the other victory was Moncton, in 1981, hosted by Calgary).

The tournament format remained unchanged from the previous year: eight teams, single elimination and Bronze medal games, with three conference champions, three conference runner-ups, OUA Bronze winner and host.

== Road to the Cup ==
=== AUS playoffs ===
Quarter-finals (Best of 3)
4	UPEI Panthers	2
5	Moncton Aigles Bleus	0
3	St. Francis Xavier X-Men	2
6	Acadia Axemen	1

Semi-finals (Best of 5)
1	UNB Reds	3
4	UPEI Panthers	0
2	Saint Mary's Huskies	2
3	St. Francis Xavier X-Men	3

AUS Championship (Best of 3)
1	UNB Reds	2
2	St. Francis Xavier X-Men	0

=== OUA playoffs ===
Division Quarter-finals (Best of 3); OUA Sweet 16
1E	Ottawa Gee-Gees	2
8E	Laurentian Voyageurs	0
4E	McGill Redmen	2
5E	UOIT Ridgebacks	0
2E	Carleton Ravens	2
7E	UQTR Patriotes	0
3E	Queen's Gaels	2
6E	Concordia Stingers	0
1W	Ryerson Rams	2
8W	Toronto Varsity Blues	0
4W	Guelph Gryphons	2
5W	Laurier Golden Hawks	0
2W	Brock Badgers	2
7W	York Lions	0
3W	Western Mustangs	2
6W	Windsor Lancers	0

Division Semi-finals (Best of 3); OUA Quarter-Finals
1E	Ottawa Gee-Gees	1
4E	Queen's Gaels	2
2E	Carleton Ravens	2
3E	McGill Redmen	1
1W	Ryerson Rams	1
4W	Guelph Gryphons	2
2W	Brock Badgers	1
3W	Western Mustangs	2

Division Finals (Best of 3); OUA Semi-Finals
2E	Carleton Ravens	0
4E	Queen's Gaels	2
3W	Western Mustangs	1
4W	Guelph Gryphons	2

Queen's Cup (Single Game); OUA Championship
4E	Queen's Gaels	4
4W	Guelph Gryphons	1
Third place – Best of 1
2E	Carleton Ravens	3
3W	Western Mustangs	0

Note 1: The Queen's Cup championship game must be held in Ontario (part of the arrangement when the RSEQ hockey league merged with the OUA). When a Quebec-based OUA-East representative is the higher seed and should 'host' the game – the game shall be hosted by the OUA-West team instead, but the OUA-East team shall be the 'home' team and have last change.

Note 2: Queen's forfeited a Feb. 9 regular season game against McGill after it was determined they dressed an ineligible player. The subsequent loss and adjusted record would relegate Queen's to the 4th seed (previously 3rd), while McGill promoted to #3 (previously 4th). However, due to the late determination of this foul (two hours before the start of the first round of the playoffs) - it was determined that the opening round matchups would remain unchanged. Going forward into the second round, the two teams (if they advanced) would be reseeded accordingly.

=== Canada West playoffs ===
Quarter-finals (Best of 3)
3	Calgary Dinos	2
6	Lethbridge Pronghorns	0
4	UBC Thunderbirds	1
5	Mount Royal Cougars	2

Semi-finals (Best of 3)
1	Saskatchewan Huskies	2
5	Mount Royal Cougars	0
2	Alberta Golden Bears	2
3	Calgary Dinos	0

Canada West Championship (Best of 3)
1	Saskatchewan Huskies	1
2	Alberta Golden Bears	2

== University Cup Tournament ==
The eight teams to advance to the tournament are listed below. The three conference champions must be seeded 1–3 based on the pre-tournament Top 10 Rankings followed by the OUA Runner-up (seed #4). The remaining four seeds are for the AUS Finalist, Canada West Finalist, OUA Third-place and host. Their seedings are based on the pre-tournament rankings.

Further Information in the tournament preview: University Cup

Rank	Seed	Team	Qualified
1	1	Alberta Golden Bears	Canada West Champions
2	2	UNB Reds	AUS Champions
5	3	Queen's Gaels	OUA Champions
6	4	Guelph Gryphons	OUA Finalists
3	5	Saskatchewan Huskies	Canada West Finalists
4	6	St. Francis Xavier X-Men	AUS Finalists
7	7	Carleton Ravens	OUA Bronze Medallists
8	8	Lethbridge Pronghorns	Host

=== Tournament format ===
The tournament is a traditional 8 team, single elimination ladder with bronze medal game between the two semi-final losers. Games that are tied after regulation play a 10-minute overtime period following the 3rd period. If there is no score after the first overtime, the ice is cleaned and they would play 20 minute periods (with ice cleaned between periods) until there is a winner.

The higher seed is the 'Home' team for each game (the home team must wear their 'white' jerseys and will get the last change during stoppages of play).

Quarter-finals (Single Game)
4	Guelph Gryphons	1
5	Saskatchewan Huskies	6
Thursday
1	Alberta Golden Bears	7
8	Lethbridge Pronghorns	1
2	UNB Reds	2
7	Carleton Ravens	1
Friday
3	Queen's Gaels	3
6	St. Francis Xavier X-Men	5

Semi-finals (Single Game)
5	Saskatchewan Huskies	0
1	Alberta Golden Bears	3
2	UNB Reds	9
6	St.FX X-Men	1

Championship final (Single Game)
1	Alberta Golden Bears	2
2	UNB Reds	4
Bronze Medal (Single Game)
1	St. Francis Xavier X-Men	5
6	Saskatchewan Huskies	1

== Results ==
=== Quarterfinals ===
March 14, 2019; 1:04 PM	(4) Guelph	1 – 6 (0–2, 1–2, 0–2)	(5) Saskatchewan	ENMAX Centre – Lethbridge, Alberta; Attendance: 2,177

Game reference

Andrew Masters
Goalies
Taran Kozun
Referees:
Jesse Gour
Danny Emerson
Linesmen:
Nick Arcan
Luke Pye

	0–1	03:37 – PP – Logan McVeigh (1) (Bauml, Cable)
	0–2	12:39 – Evan Fiala (1) (Shirley, W. Johnson)
	0–3	21:46 – PP – Carson Stadnyk (1) (Shirley, J. Forsberg)
(Swenson) Scott Simmonds (3) – 27:53	1–3
	1–4	33:41 – Wyatt Johnson (2) (J. Forsberg, Shirley)
	1–5	52:49 – Carson Stadnyk (2) (W. Johnson, Shirley)
	1–6	56:42 – Levi Cable (6)

44 min
Penalties
16 min
32
Shots
27

March 14, 2019; 7:14 PM	(1) Alberta	7 – 1 (1–0, 3–1, 3–0)	(8) Lethbridge	ENMAX Centre – Lethbridge, Alberta

Game reference

Zach Sawchenko
Goalies
Garret Hughson

(Cox, Craig) Luke Philp (2) – 10:36	1–0
(Owre, Sanford) Luke Philp (3) – PP – 23:24	2–0
	2–1	24:11 – Connor Sanvido (1) (Valentino, Orban)
(Cooper, Kieser) Ben Carroll (1) – SH – 32:20	3–1
(Cox, Legault) Cole Sanford (1) – 39:52	4–1
(Cox, Magee) Sawyer Lange (1) – 42:43	5–1
(Sanford, Philp) Trevor Cox (2) – 51:45	6–1
(Philp) Brandon Magee (3) – 56:11	7–1

4 min
Penalties
6 min
28
Shots
12

March 15, 2019; 1:05 PM	(2) New Brunswick	2 – 1 (1–0, 1–1, 0–0)	(7) Carleton	ENMAX Centre – Lethbridge, Alberta; Attendance: 793

Game reference

Alex Dubeau
Goalies
François Brassard

(Anderson, Clapperton) Tyler Boland (4) – 07:15	1–0
	1–1	24:32 – Matthew Forchuk (5) (Smith, Boivin)
(Goulet, Murphy) Matt Boudens (1) – 26:26	2–1

8 min
Penalties
10 min
38
Shots
23

March 15, 2019; 7:02 PM	(1) Queen's	3 – 5 (3–1, 0–1, 0–3)	(8) St. Francis Xavier	ENMAX Centre – Lethbridge, Alberta; Attendance: 870

Game reference

Justin Fazio
Goalies
Chase Marchand

(Guy, Vilardi) Luke Edwards (1) – PP – 06:36	1–0
(Lindo, Sanvido) Luke Edwards (2) – 10:26	2–0
(Stout, Guy) Francesco Vilardi (1) – 16:41	3–0
	3–1	18:04 – PP – Holden Cook (2) (Stevens, MacDonald)
	3–2	33:37 – PP – Adam Stevens (5) (Cook, Cianfrone)
	3–3	49:19 – Holden Cook (3) (Tremaine, Cianfrone)
	3–4	53:56 – Adam Laishram (3) (Spears, Bower)
	3–5	59:18 – EN – Sam Studnicka (2) (Stevens)

20 min
Penalties
2 min
32
Shots
40

=== Semifinals ===
March 16, 2019; 6:09 PM	(1) Alberta	3 – 0 (0–0, 0–0, 3–0)	(5) Saskatchewan	ENMAX Centre – Lethbridge, Alberta; Attendance: 1,500

Game reference

Zach Sawchenko
Goalies
Taran Kozun

(Legault, Carroll) Riley Kieser (2) – 41:38	1–0
(Pawlenchuk, Carroll) Luke Philp (4) – 50:32	2–0
Grayson Pawlenchuk (3) – EN – 59:30	3–0

31 min
Penalties
88 min
45
Shots
33

March 16, 2019; 6:09 PM	(1) New Brunswick	9 – 1 (4–0, 2–1, 3–0)	(8) St. Francis Xavier	ENMAX Centre – Lethbridge, Alberta; Attendance: 1,021

Game reference

Alex Dubeau
Goalies
Chase Marchand

(Bennett, Pomerleau) Cameron Brace (2) – 01:36	1–0
Alexandre Goulet (2) – SH – 06:07	2–0
Kris Bennett (6) – 06:58	3–0
(Boucher, McIvor) Samuel Dove-McFalls (1) – 12:59	4–0
	4–1	25:47 – Adam Laishram (4) (Needham)
(LeBlanc, Gatenby) Kris Bennett (7) – 30:37	5–1
(Boland, Gazzola) Chris Clapperton (2) – 31:44	6–1
(Dove-McFalls, LeBlanc) Kris Bennett (8) – 44:14	7–1
(Boucher, Goulet) Joe Gatenby (1) – 52:39	8–1
Kris Bennett (9) – 54:12	9–1

22 min
Penalties
34 min
54
Shots
20

=== Gold Medal Game ===
March 17, 2019; 6:00 (local); Sportsnet 360; TVA Sports 2	(1) Alberta	2 – 4 (1–1, 0–2, 1–1)	(2) New Brunswick	ENMAX Centre – Lethbridge, Alberta; Attendance: 1,573

Game reference

Zach Sawchenko
Goalies
Alex Dubeau
Referees:
Adam Bloski
Chris Crich
Linesmen:
Chad Huseby
Mike Roberts

(Magee, Fram) Steven Owre (1) – PP – 4:33	1–0
	1–1	06:36 – Samuel Dove-McFalls (2) (Rassell)
	1–2	24:27 – Oliver Cooper (2) (Gazzola, Boucher)
	1–3	37:29 – PP – Kris Bennett (10) (Boland, Simpson)
(Pawlenchuk, Legault) Brandon Magee (4)	2–3
	2–4	50:57 – Mark Rassell (5)

14 min
Penalties
6 min
34
Shots
31

Game MVPs: Mark Rassell (UNB) & Brandon Magee (ALB)

=== Bronze Medal Game ===
March 17, 2019; 1:00 (local)	(5) Saskatchewan	1 – 5 (0–2, 0–2, 1–1)	(6) St. Francis Xavier	ENMAX Centre – Lethbridge; Attendance: 923

Game reference

Travis Child
Goalies
Chase Marchand
Referees:
Cory Bannerman
Colin Watt
Linesmen:
Deion Foster
Brett Mackey

	0–1	02:07 – PP – Adam Holwell (2) (Robertson, Spears)
	0–2	12:41 – PP – Cole MacDonald (3) (Cianfrone, Laishram)
	0–3	21:26 – Adam Holwell (3) (Cianfrone, Tremaine)
	0–4	35:58 – Matt Needham (1) (Tremaine, Cianfrone)
	0–5	43:28 – PP – Matthew Graham (2) (Thompson, Pancel)
(Yakubowski) Parker Thomas (2) – 59:29	1–5

18 min
Penalties
16 min
49
Shots
16

Game MVPs: Chase Marchand (SFX) & Michael Sofillas (USK)

== Tournament All-Stars ==
Alex Dubeau, from the UNB Reds, was selected as the Major W.J. 'Danny' McLeod Award for USports University Cup MVP. Dubeau played all three games for UNB (Game 1 MVP versus Carleton) and finished the tournament with a GAA of 1.33 and Save Percentage of 0.948.

Joining Dubeau on the tournament all-star team were:
Forward: Kris Bennett (UNB Reds)
Forward: Christopher Clapperton (UNB Reds)
Forward: Luke Philp (Alberta Golden Bears)
Defenceman: Marcus McIvor (UNB Reds)
Defenceman: Jason Fram (Alberta Golden Bears)
