= 2028 U Sports University Cup =

Canadian university ice hockey championship

Tournament details
- Cities: Fredericton, New Brunswick
- Venue: Aitken Centre
- Dates: March 19–22, 2028
- Teams: 8

The 2028 U Sports University Cup, the 65th edition, is scheduled to be held in March 2028, in Fredericton, New Brunswick, to determine a national champion for the 2027–28 U Sports men's ice hockey season. The tournament will be hosted by the UNB Reds.

== Host ==
The tournament is scheduled to be played at the Aitken Centre in Fredericton, New Brunswick. This is scheduled to be the sixth time that the University of New Brunswick will host the tournament, with the most recent in 2018.

== Scheduled teams ==
- Canada West Champion
- OUA Champion
- AUS Champion
- Host (UNB Reds)
- Four additional berths
