= 2020 U Sports University Cup =

Canadian university ice hockey championship

Tournament details
- Venue(s): Scotiabank Centre, Halifax, Nova Scotia
- Dates: March 12–15, 2020
- Teams: 8

Tournament statistics
- Games played: 2

The 2020 U Sports University Cup hockey tournament (58th Annual) was scheduled for March 2020 in Halifax, Nova Scotia at the Scotiabank Centre, to determine a national champion for the 2019–20 U Sports men's ice hockey season, but was cancelled because of the COVID-19 pandemic after the first day of competition. The Acadia Axemen, a member of U Sports Atlantic University Sport conference, were the designated host. The Scotiabank Centre is 99 kilometres south of the school's campus (Wolfville). This event marked the third appearance of the tournament in Halifax, which hosted the 2015 and 2016 tournaments. This was the first time that Acadia was the host of the tournament; St. Francis Xavier University and Saint Mary's University split hosting rights (respectively) during the previous two-year stint.

The tournament format remained unchanged from the previous year: Eight teams, single elimination and bronze medal games, with three conference champions, three conference runner-ups, OUA bronze winner and host.

On February 13, 2020, U Sports and CBC Sports jointly announced the tournament would be streamed free of charge via the CBC Gem streaming service in Canada. U Sports' previous broadcasting deal with Sportsnet expired following the 2019 U Sports University Cup.

The tournament was suspended on the night of March 12, after the first two games had been played, due to a decision by Hockey Canada to suspend all sanctioned hockey across the country. The impact of this decision was to leave the tournament with no on-ice officials and as result left the Tournament Committee with no choice but to suspend the remaining games. U Sports Hockey, as an organization, is not directly under the Hockey Canada umbrella, but they do have a development partnership where Hockey Canada Level 4, 5 and 6 officials officiate U Sports hockey along with the Team Canada Junior vs U Sports All-Star games.

== Road to the Cup ==
=== AUS playoffs ===
Quarter-finals (Best of 3)
4	Moncton Aigles Bleus	2
5	St. Francis Xavier X-Men	0
3	Saint Mary's Huskies	2
6	UPEI Panthers	0

Semi-finals (Best of 5)
1	UNB Reds	3
4	Moncton Aigles Bleus	0
2	Acadia Axemen	3
3	Saint Mary's Huskies	1

AUS Championship (Best of 3)
1	UNB Reds	2
2	Acadia Axemen	1
Third place
4	Moncton Aigles Bleus	0
3	Saint Mary's Huskies	2

With Acadia advancing to the AUS Finals, a third place team was required as a replacement 'host' as Acadia would qualify as either the AUS Champion or AUS Runner-up.

=== OUA playoffs ===
Division Quarter-finals (Best of 3); OUA Sweet 16
1E	Carleton Ravens	2
8E	RMC Paladins	0
OUA East
4E	McGill Redmen	1
5E	Concordia Stingers	2
2E	UQTR Patriotes	2
7E	Queen's Gaels	0
OUA East
3E	Ottawa Gee-Gees	2
6E	Ontario Tech Ridgebacks	1
2W	Ryerson Rams	2
7W	Lakehead Thunderwolves	0
OUA West
1W	Toronto Varsity Blues	1
8W	Western Mustangs	2
3W	Guelph Gryphons	2
6W	Laurier Golden Hawks	1
OUA West
4W	Windsor Lancers	0
5W	Brock Badgers	2

Division Semi-finals (Best of 3); OUA Quarter-Finals
1E	Carleton Ravens	0
5E	Concordia Stingers	2
2E	UQTR Patriotes	1
3E	Ottawa Gee-Gees	2
2W	Ryerson Rams	0
8W	Western Mustangs	2
3W	Guelph Gryphons	2
5W	Brock Badgers	0

Division Finals (Best of 3); OUA Semi-Finals
5E	Concordia Stingers	0
3E	Ottawa Gee-Gees	2
8W	Western Mustangs	1
3W	Guelph Gyrphons	2

Queen's Cup (Single Game); OUA Championship
3E	Ottawa Gee-Gees	1
3W	Guelph Gryphons	2 OT3
Third place – Best of 1
5E	Concordia Stingers	2
8W	Western Mustangs	5

Note 1: The Queen's Cup championship game must be held in Ontario (part of the arrangement when the RSEQ hockey league merged with the OUA). When a Quebec-based OUA-East representative is the higher seed and should 'host' the game – the game shall be hosted by the OUA-West team instead, but the OUA-East team shall be the 'home' team and have last change. This rule did not have to be applied this season as both teams are from Ontario. Guelph hosted Ottawa as they had the better record 17–6–5 for 39 points versus 17–7–4 for 38 points.

Note 2: The OUA 'Host' rule mentioned in Note 1 now, as of 2019–20, also applies to the bronze medal game. This season Western would host Concordia with Concordia having 'home' change.

Note 3: OUA Playoffs re-seed teams in each round such that the highest advancing seed plays the lowest advancing seed within their divisional bracket.

=== Canada West playoffs ===
Quarter-finals (Best of 3)
3	Calgary Dinos	2
6	Manitoba Bisons	0
4	Mount Royal Cougars	1
5	UBC Thunderbirds	2

Semi-finals (Best of 3)
1	Alberta Golden Bears	1
5	UBC Thunderbirds	2
2	Saskatchewan Huskies	2
4	Calgary Dinos	0

Canada West Championship (Best of 3)
2	Saskatchewan Huskies	2
5	UBC Thunderbirds	0

== University Cup Tournament ==
The eight teams to advance to the tournament are listed below. The three (3) conference champions must be seeded 1–3 based on the pre-tournament Top 10 Rankings followed by the OUA Runner-up (seed #4). The remaining four seeds are for the AUS Finalist, Canada West Finalist, OUA Third-place and host or host designate if the host has qualified as one of the previously mentioned teams. Their seedings are based on the pre-tournament rankings.

More details in the tournament preview: University Cup Preview

Rank	Seed	Team	Qualified
1	1	UNB Reds	AUS Champions
2	2	Saskatchewan Huskies	Canada West Champions
3	3	Guelph Gryphons	Queen's Cup & OUA-West Champion
4	4	Ottawa Gee-Gees	Queen's Finalists & OUA-East Champion
5	5	Acadia Axemen	AUS Finalists
6	6	Saint Mary's Huskies	AUS Bronze – Host Designate
7	7	Western Mustangs	OUA Bronze Medallists
9	8	British Columbia Thunderbirds	CW Finalists

=== Tournament format ===
The tournament is a traditional 8 team, single elimination ladder with bronze medal game between the two semi-final losers. Games that are tied after regulation play a 10-minute overtime period following the 3rd period. If there is no score after the first overtime, the ice is cleaned and they would play 20 minute periods (with ice cleaned between periods) until there is a winner.

The higher seed is the 'Home' team for each game (the home team must wear their 'white' jerseys and will get the last change during stoppages of play).

Quarter-finals (Single Game)
2	Saskatchewan Huskies	2
7	Western Mustangs	3
Thursday
3	Guelph Gryphons	1
6	Saint Mary's Huskies	5
1	UNB Reds	—
8	British Columbia Thunderbirds	—
Friday
4	Ottawa Gee-Gees	—
5	Acadia Axemen	—

Semi-finals (Single Game)
7	Western Mustangs	—
6	Saint Mary's Huskies	—

Championship final (Single Game)
Bronze Medal (Single Game)

The tournament was suspended late Thursday night, after the first two games had been completed.
