= 2027 U Sports University Cup =

Canadian university ice hockey championship

Tournament details
- Cities: Trois-Rivières, Quebec
- Venue: Colisée Vidéotron
- Dates: March 25–29, 2027
- Teams: 8

The 2027 U Sports University Cup, the 63rd edition, is scheduled to be held March 25–29, 2027, in Trois-Rivières, Quebec, to determine a national champion for the 2026–27 U Sports men's ice hockey season. The tournament will be hosted by the UQTR Patriotes.

== Host ==
The tournament is scheduled to be played at the Colisée Vidéotron in Trois-Rivières, Quebec. This is scheduled to be the second time that the Université du Québec à Trois-Rivières will host the tournament, with the first in 1984, and the fourth time that the tournament is played in Quebec.

== Scheduled teams ==
- Canada West Champion
- OUA Champion
- AUS Champion
- Host (UQTR Patriotes)
- Two assigned berths for OUA
- One assigned berth for Canada West
- One assigned berth for AUS
