= 2008 CIS University Cup =

Canadian hockey tournament

2008 Cavendish CIS University Cup
Tournament details
- Venue(s): Jean-Louis Lévesque Arena, Moncton, New Brunswick
- Dates: March 20–23, 2008
- Teams: 6

Final positions
- Champions: Alberta Golden Bears (13th title)
- Runners-up: New Brunswick Varsity Reds

Tournament statistics
- Games played: 7

Awards
- MVP: Ian McDonald (Alberta)

The 2008 CIS Men's University Cup Hockey Tournament (46th Annual) was held March 20–23, 2008, at the Jean-Louis Lévesque Arena in Moncton, New Brunswick. The Moncton Aigles Bleus served as tournament host.

== Road to the Cup ==
=== AUS playoffs ===
Quarterfinals (Best of 3)
3	Moncton Aigles Bleus	5	7	—
6	Acadia Axemen	0	2	—
4	St. Thomas Tommies	2	2	4
5	St. Francis Xavier X-Men	1	4	0

Semifinals (Best of 5)
1	New Brunswick Varsity Reds	5	5	5	—	—
4	St. Thomas Tommies	1	4	1	—	—
2	Saint Mary's Huskies	6	5	4	—	—
3	Moncton Aigles Bleus	2	1	2	—	—

AUS Championship (Best of 3)
1	New Brunswick Varsity Reds	3	3	—
2	Saint Mary's Huskies	2	2	—

=== OUA playoffs ===
Division Quarterfinals (Best of 3)
FW3	Waterloo Warriors	1
FW4	Wilfrid Laurier Golden Hawks	2
FE2	McGill Redmen	2
FE4	Carleton Ravens	0
FW2	Western Ontario Mustangs	2
MW2	York Lions	0
FE3	Ottawa Gee-Gees	2
ME2	Toronto Varsity Blues	1

Division Semifinals (Best of 3)
FW1	Lakehead Thunderwolves	2
FW4	Wilfrid Laurier Golden Hawks	1
MW1	Brock Badgers	2
FW2	Western Mustangs	1
FE1	Quebec–Trois-Rivières	2
FE3	Ottawa Gee-Gees	0
ME1	Queen's Golden Gaels	0
FE2	McGill Redmen	2

Division Finals (Best of 3)
FW1	Lakehead Thunderwolves	1
MW1	Brock Badgers	2
FE1	Quebec–Trois-Rivières	0
FE2	McGill Redmen	2

Queen's Cup (Single Game)
MW2	Brock Badgers	1
FE2	McGill Redmen	4

=== Canada West playoffs ===
Quarterfinals (Best of 3)
3	Calgary Dinos	5	4	—
6	Regina Cougars	2	3	—
4	Manitoba Bisons	6	4	—
5	British Columbia Thunderbirds	0	2	—

Semifinals (Best of 3)
1	Alberta Golden Bears	4	4	—
4	Manitoba Bisons	2	3	—
2	Saskatchewan Huskies	5	5	—
3	Calgary Dinos	3	2	—

Championship (Best of 3)
1	Alberta Golden Bears	8	5	—
2	Saskatchewan Huskies	3	0	—

== University Cup ==
The six teams that advanced to the tournament are listed below. The Champions of each conference tournament received automatic bids and were seeded 1–3. One spot in the tournament was reserved for the host school, Moncton, while another went to the best team from the Quebec region, OUA finalist Brock. The lone wild card spot went to the highest-ranked remaining team, Saskatchewan.

Seed	Team	Qualification	Record	Appearance	Last
1	New Brunswick Varsity Reds	Atlantic: AUS Champion	31–1–1	10th	2007
2	Alberta Golden Bears	West: Canada West Champion	25–5–2	32nd	2006
3	McGill Redmen	Quebec: OUA Champion	25–9–1	2nd	2006
4	Saskatchewan Huskies	Wild-card: Canada West Finalist	19–7–6	13th	2007
5	Brock Badgers	Ontario: OUA Finalist	21–12–2	1st	Never
6	Moncton Aigles Bleus	Host	19–13–1	14th	2007

=== Pool A – Afternoon ===
Seed	Team
1	New Brunswick
4	Saskatchewan
5	Brock

Day	Game	Winner	Loser	Score
Thursday	1	#1 New Brunswick	#5 Brock	6–1
Friday	3	#4 Saskatchewan	#5 Brock	4–1
Saturday	5	#1 New Brunswick	#4 Saskatchewan	4–0

Team	GP	W	L	GF	GA	DIF	PTS
New Brunswick	2	2	0	10	1	+9	4
Saskatchewan	2	1	1	4	5	−1	2
Brock	2	0	2	2	10	−8	0

New Brunswick advance to championship

=== Pool B – Evening ===
Seed	Team
2	Alberta Golden Bears
3	McGill Redmen
6	Moncton Aigles Bleus

Day	Game	Winner	Loser	Score
Thursday	2	#6 Moncton	#2 Alberta	2–1
Friday	4	#2 Alberta	#3 McGill	7–3
Saturday	6	#3 McGill	#6 Moncton	3–0

Team	GP	W	L	GF	GA	DIF	PTS
Alberta	2	1	1	8	5	+3	2
McGill	2	1	1	6	7	−1	2
Moncton	2	1	1	2	4	−2	2

Alberta advance to championship

== Championship final ==
March 23, 2008; 7:00 PM (EST)	#1 New Brunswick Varaity Reds	2–3 (1–0, 1–2, 0–1)	#2 Alberta Golden Bears	Jean-Louis Lévesque Arena, Moncton, New Brunswick

Game reference

Justin DaCosta	1–0
	1–1	Tim Krymusas
Rob Hennigar	2–1
	2–2	Brian Woolger
	2–3	Ian McDonald

42
Shots
25
