= Ben Thomson (ice hockey, born 1982) =

Canadian ice hockey player (born 1982)

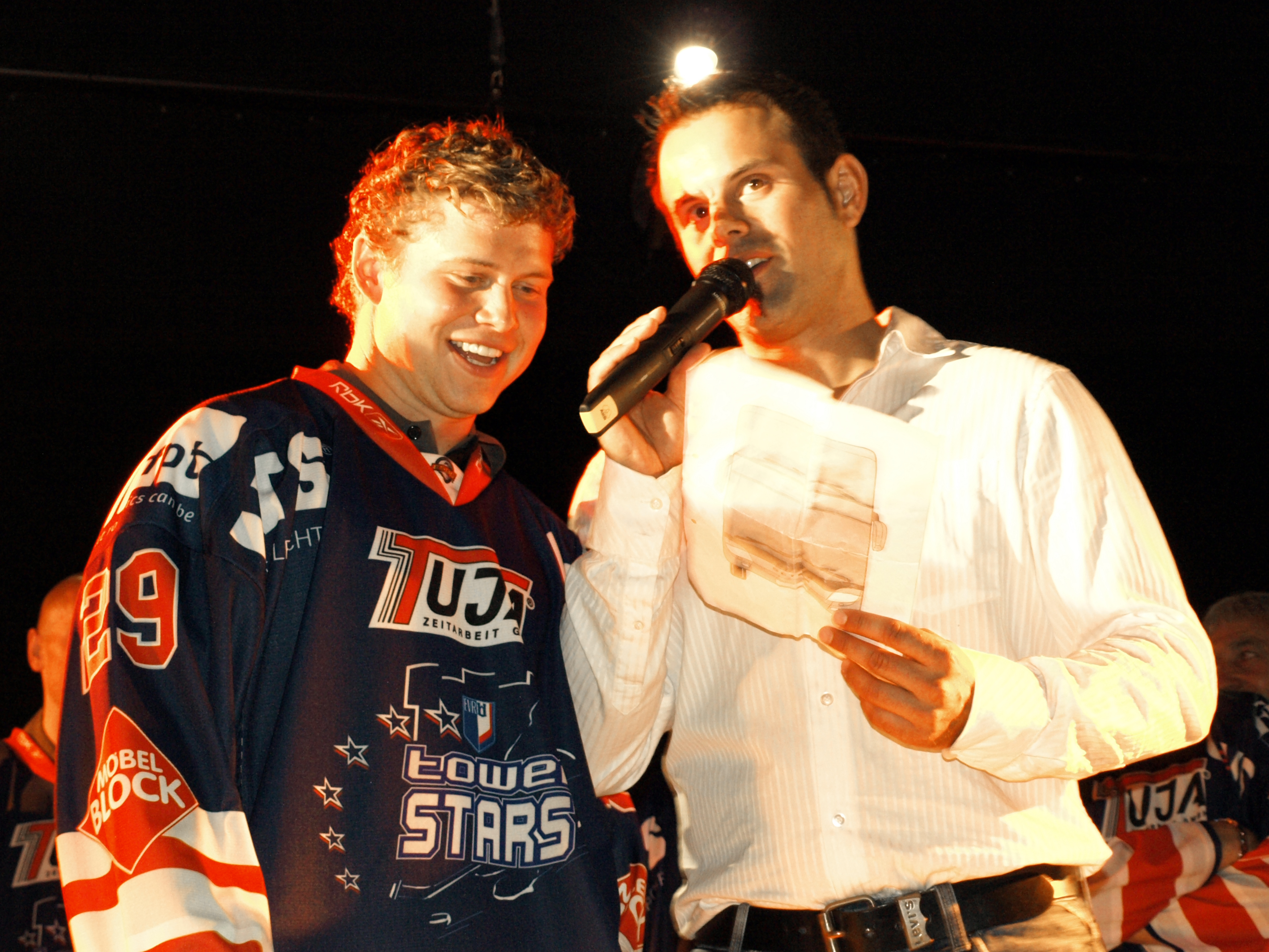
- Thomson with the Ravensburg Towerstars (2008)
- Born: June 30, 1982 (age 44) Coaldale, Alberta, Canada
- Height: 5 ft 7 in (170 cm)
- Weight: 181 lb (82 kg; 12 st 13 lb)
- Position: Centre
- Shot: Left
- Played for: Houston Aeros (AHL); Texas Wildcatters (ECHL); Klagenfurter AC (Austria)
- NHL draft: Undrafted
- Playing career: 2006–2012

Ben Thomson (born June 30, 1982) is a Canadian former professional ice hockey player.

Thomson played major junior hockey in the Western Hockey League (WHL) with the Medicine Hat Tigers, before attending the University of Alberta.

In university, he played for the University of Alberta Golden Bears from 2003–04 to 2005–06. He won the 2003–04 University of Alberta Hockey Alumni Trophy as the CIS (West) Most Outstanding Freshman. The Golden Bears won the national CIS University Cup championship in 2005 and 2006, with Thomson winning the Major W.J. "Danny" McLeod Award in 2005, as Most Valuable Player of the national championship tournament.

On July 12, 2006, Thomson signed with the Houston Aeros of the American Hockey League (AHL), and he went on to play 47 games with the AHL team, and also 6 games in the ECHL with the Texas Wildcatters, during the 2006–07 season.

Thomson moved to Europe for the 2007–08 season where he played 17 games with Klagenfurt AC in the Austrian Hockey League before settling in with the Ravensburg Towerstars of Germany's 2nd Bundesliga where he remained until his retirement from professional hockey following the 2011–12 season. Thompson was a member of the Ravensburg Towerstars when they were crowned the 2010–11 league champions.

== Awards and honours ==
Award	Year
University of Alberta Hockey Alumni Trophy - CIS (West) Most Outstanding Freshman	2003–04
Major W.J. "Danny" McLeod Award - CIS University Cup Most Valuable Player	2004–05
