= 2021 U Sports University Cup =

Canadian university ice hockey championship

Tournament details
- Venue(s): Eastlink Centre, Charlottetown, Prince Edward Island
- Dates: March 18–21, 2021
- Teams: 8

The 2021 U Sports University Cup hockey tournament (59th Annual) was scheduled to be held from March 18, 2021, to March 21, 2021, in Charlottetown, Prince Edward Island, to determine a national champion for the 2020–21 U Sports men's ice hockey season. However, on October 15, 2020, it was announced that the University Cup championship was cancelled due to the COVID-19 pandemic.

U Sports, along with agreements from Acadia and UPEI, maintained the current hosting schedule and awarded the 2022 University Cup to Acadia and the 2023 University Cup to UPEI.

== Host ==
The UPEI Panthers, a member of U Sports Atlantic University Sport conference, was scheduled to host the event at the Eastlink Centre with support from the Province of PEI, and the City of Charlottetown. This would have been the second time that UPEI had hosted the tournament, having first hosted in the school's inaugural year in 1970. The school also hosted the 2019 and 2020 U Sports women's ice hockey championship tournaments.

== Format ==
The tournament would have featured an eight-team, single-elimination tournament, as introduced in 2015, and would have included quarter-finals, semi-finals, finals and a bronze medal game.
