= U Sports men's ice hockey championship =

Canadian ice hockey tournament and trophy

- Current season, competition or edition: 2026 U Sports University Cup
- Sport: Ice hockey
- Founded: 1963; 63 years ago
- First season: 1963
- Organizing body: U Sports
- No. of teams: 8
- Country: Canada
- Most recent champion: Quebec–Trois-Rivières Patriotes (6th title)
- Most titles: Alberta Golden Bears (16)
- Website: usports.ca/en/championships/hockey/m

The U Sports Men's Ice Hockey Championship is a Canadian university ice hockey tournament conducted by U Sports, and determines the men's national champion. The tournament involves the champions from each of Canada's four regional sports conferences. The David Johnston University Cup is awarded to the winners.

The UQTR Patriotes are the current champions for the 2025–26 season. The Alberta Golden Bears hold the record of 16 championship wins, as well as the record of 24 championship final appearances. The Toronto Varsity Blues hold the record of five consecutive championship trophy wins, from 1969 through 1973, but have not returned to the tournament since 1993, when they suffered the second most lopsided loss in a UCup final, 12–1. Alternatively, during their power years, winning 9 UCups in the 1960s and 1970s, the Blues were the victors in the overall most lopsided final, winning 16–2 in 1967. In the seven years from 2013 through 2019, only the Alberta Golden Bears (3 wins) or the UNB Reds (4 wins) won the championship.

== History ==
The trophy was presented to U Sports, then known as the Canadian Intercollegiate Athletic Union (CIAU), for presentation to a national champion starting with the 1962–63 season, by Queen's University and the Royal Military College of Canada. These two schools, located in Kingston, Ontario, had been the participants in the first organized interuniversity hockey game, played in Kingston in 1885. The cup is meant to recognize the overall contribution made to the game of hockey by outstanding university players.

In 2001, the CIAU changed its name to Canadian Interuniversity Sport (renaming the trophy the CIS University Cup), and again in October 2016 to U Sports (renaming the trophy the U Sports University Cup).

The original University Cup is located at the Hockey Hall of Fame in Toronto and does not travel publicly. A replica was created with a less ornate cup in 2006. Between 2006 and 2015, the trophy has been modified after several repairs - the metal bowl is now of simpler design, and mounts more flush to the main wooden portion. The two handles that used to be attached to the bowl, and frequently broke off, were removed. An additional black wooden ring was added to the bottom of the trophy in order to incorporate more school shields, as an engraved metal shield, with diagonal stripes in the winning school's colours, is added to the trophy every year.

On March 13, 2018, U Sports renamed the cup the David Johnston University Cup in honour of David Johnston, former Governor General of Canada.

The 2020 championship was cancelled due to the COVID-19 pandemic after two quarter-final games had already been played. On October 15, 2020, the 2021 iteration was also cancelled.

With the completion of the 2023–24 season, 27 different teams have played in the national championship final (however Sir George Williams University merged with Loyola College in 1974 to create Concordia University, so it could be described as 26 different teams). In all, 17 different teams have won the national championship.

The winningest coaches are Tom Watt and former UNB coach Gardiner MacDougall, whom, at the helm of the Toronto Varsity Blues and Reds respectively, won nine University Cup championships between 1966 and 1977 and 2007 and 2024. Clare Drake sits second, coaching the Alberta Golden Bears to six University Cup championships between 1964 and 1986.

== Format ==
=== 1963–1971 ===
When the tournament was inaugurated in 1963, the only teams invited were conference champions. At the time, not every conference held a postseason tournament, nor was every conference champion invited. The only participating teams were the champions of the four leagues thought of to be playing senior college hockey. Not all teams were satisfied with this arrangement. The OIAA applies for its champion to receive an entry into the 1964 tournament but their application was denied. In protest, the conference immediately dissolved and forced the CIAU committee to reconsider over the summer. At the same time, Toronto, declined their invitation in 1964. The very next season, with the OIAA now included in the tournament field, all four teams that qualified for the QOAA tournament announced that they would not accept an invitation to the 1965 University Cup.

While these disagreements could have dealt a debilitating blow to the tournament, all parties were eventually able to come to an agreement by 1966. The champions of the five conferences would now be invited to participate with the conferences that reached the final the previous season automatically being placed in the semifinals. Unfortunately, this new arrangement meant that whichever team lost the quarterfinal round would only play a single game. Previously, thanks to the consolation match, all teams were guaranteed at least two matches. In order to address this minor wrinkle, a consolation bracket was introduced in 1967. For several years afterwards, teams that lost in either the quarterfinal or semifinal rounds would play one another to determine the final three places in the tournament. This format remained largely intact for the next several years until a large conference realignment took place in 1971.

=== 1971–1975 ===
The early 1970s saw three leagues in the middle of the country dissolve with all associated teams resorted into two provincial conferences for Ontario and Quebec. As a result, the tournament entrants were reduced back to four teams and allowed the University Cup to eliminate both the quarterfinal round and the consolation bracket in 1972. However, one year later, the WCIAU was split in two as a way to help the western teams cut down on operating costs. An arrangement was made with the two new conferences (Canada West and GPAC) to allow the champions of both leagues entry into the University Cup, however, rather than play individual league championships, the two would send their regular season champions to the tournament site to play a quarterfinal match during the same time that the other three conference were holding their respective playoffs. This de facto conference championship was only held between the two western leagues. Additionally, instead of bringing the consolation bracket back, both the quarterfinal and semifinal rounds were converted into best of three series, guaranteeing that all participating teams would play at least two games. This format was used only for three seasons with a slight modification in 1975; that season saw the championship round being a best-of-three for the

=== 1976 ===
In 1976, the University Cup format was radically altered. First, the team that agreed to serve as host (Toronto) was given an automatic qualifier for the first time. Because this could result in one conference having six teams participate for the first time, the CIAU decided to invite two teams from each of the five conference. This resulted in the largest field that tournament had ever seen (as of 2024). The secondary teams were selected based upon their performance in the respective conference tournaments. The two finalists from four of the leagues would automatically qualify four the tournament while, for the host team, if they were to win their tournament the final bid would go to the runner-up otherwise it would go to their conference champion. The qualifying teams were then sorted into three separate groups: East, West and Host. The conference that served as host (OUAA) would have both of their qualifiers advanced to the semifinal round while the remaining eight teams were placed into regional semifinal brackets. Due to the expanded nature of the tournament, the regional rounds were held at the home venue of one of the qualifying teams.

One team from each region (East and West) would advance to the semifinal round, however, seeding was not determined ahead of time. Instead, the bracket was arranged so that the East and West champion would play one of the two host conference teams in a semifinal first round. The winners of the first round game would then advance to the second round of the semifinals and play the losing team of the opposite first round match. It was only the winners of the semifinal second round that would advance to the championship game. Perhaps unsurprisingly, this convoluted format survived for only one tournament.

=== 1977–1985 ===
While many of the advents of the 1976 tournament were discarded, one was retained; the tournament host would continue to receive an automatic berth until 1987. With the field now set at six teams, the format was changed to a round-robin style. The participants were sorted into two three-team groups. Within each group, the teams would play one another once and the team with the best record would advance to the final. Ties were allowed in pool play, however, in case there was a tie in the standings, the team with the better goal differential would be advanced. This format remained unchanged until 1984, when the round-robin was dropped in favor of a quarterfinal round.

For two tournaments in the mid-80s, the conference that served as host would have both of its qualifying teams advance to the semifinals (much as they had in 1976). However, instead of a regional bracket, the remaining league champions were placed into East and West quarterfinals. The quarterfinal rounds were best-of-three while the semifinals were two-game total goal series.

=== 1986–1987 ===
The collapse of the GPAC in 1985 resulted in a reduction of senior conferences down to four. Because the tournament host was still being offered an automatic bid, this left the field at 5 entrants. Instead of using one of the previous formats, the University Cup was expanded to seven teams. The qualifying schools were selected by one of three ways: The Host (Alberta) was seeded first and received a bye into the semifinal round. The champions of the four leagues were then sorted two through five based upon their overall records and placed in the quarterfinals accordingly. The final two wild-card spots would then go to the runners-up from the AUAA and OUAA and arranged so that there would not be intra-conference matches in the quarterfinal round. The QUAA was the only conference not to receive a second bye due to the fact that the league had been pared down to just five schools at the time.

For the 1987 tournament, the format reverted to a round-robin arrangement. Still with four conference champions, the tournament offered one wild-card spot to the runner-up of the OUAA tournament. This was done primarily due to the fact that the OUAA was by far the largest conference. However, this format lasted just one season before the OUAA absorbed QUAA, leaving just three active senior collegiate leagues.

=== 1988–1997 ===
1988 began a new era for the tournament. Toronto agreed to serve as tournament host for ten years. This allowed the CIAU to eliminate the automatic qualifier for the host team as an incentive. The tournament field was reduced to four entrants: Atlantic, Ontario, Quebec and West. The Atlantic and West spots would go to the AUAA and Canada West champions respectively. The OUAA would receive both the Ontario and Quebec bids which would go to the two tournament finalists. This format remained in place for the entire time that Toronto served as host. In later years, the championship game was held at Maple Leaf Gardens.

=== 1998–2014 ===
Starting in 1998, the CIS changed the format of the University Cup tournament to a six-team/two-pool tournament that would be hosted by a CIS member institution/team rather than in Toronto at Varsity Arena. The host would automatically be included in the tournament leaving five spots for regional representatives. The three conference champions and OUA Queen's Cup Runner-up would automatically be included with the fifth spot as a rotating 'wild-card' team. The University of Saskatchewan Huskies won the bid to host the first three (3) tournaments: 1998, 1999 and 2000.

The wild-card selection was initially chosen based on a static rotation through each conference starting with the AUS in 1998 followed by the OUA and CW, repeating on a tri-year cycle. Due to the random nature of the host bidding process, some tournaments saw more local teams then expected when the host advanced as a conference champion. It was possible for CW or AUS hosts to have 3 teams from their conference or 4 teams in the case of an OUA host who was also a champion. To reduce the local bias, the rotation selection rule was changed prior to the 2009 season - the wild-card would now only come from a non-host conference while maintaining the rotation. In 2009 the OUA was the host conference (Lakehead University) and should have also been the original wild-card conference, instead the AUS provided the wild-card. This rule remained in effect until the format changed in 2015 to 8 teams.

=== 2015–present ===
Starting in 2015, the tournament expanded from six to eight teams and moved from a two-pool format to a single-elimination competition (quarter-finals, semifinals and gold-medal final plus a bronze-medal game).

The eight teams competing include the four regional conference champions: AUS, Canada West, OUA West and OUA East (where the three men's hockey teams from the RSEQ compete). The remaining four teams are: the host, the Canada West runner-up, the AUS runner-up and the OUA 3rd-place finisher (bronze medalist). The 'natural' conference champions are seeded 1–3; AUS, CW and OUA Queen's Cup Champion (in ranked order). The OUA Queen's Cup Finalist is always seed No. 4. The remaining teams are seeded 5–7, all based on the pre-tournament Top 10 Ranking Poll with the expectation that the host is likely 8th.

A joint bid from St. Francis Xavier University and Saint Mary's University was selected to host the first two events using this format; 2015 (St. FX as the host) and 2016 (SMU as the host). U Sports evaluated those two events and continues to use this tournament format.

== Results ==
Cup champions
Year	Champion	Runner-up	Score	Host university	Location
1963	McMaster Marlins (1)	British Columbia Thunderbirds	3–2	Queen's & RMC	Kingston, Ontario
1964	Alberta Golden Bears (1)	Sir George Williams Georgians	9–1	Queen's & RMC	Kingston, Ontario
1965	Manitoba Bisons (1)	St. Dunstan's Saints	9–2	Manitoba	Winnipeg, Manitoba
1966	Toronto Varsity Blues (1)	Alberta Golden Bears	8–1	Laurentian	Sudbury, Ontario
1967	Toronto Varsity Blues (2)	Laurentian Voyageurs	16–2	Calgary & Alberta	Calgary, Alberta
1968	Alberta Golden Bears (2)	Loyola Warriors	5–4	Sir George Williams, Loyola & MacDonald	Montreal, Quebec
1969	Toronto Varsity Blues (3)	Sir George Williams Georgians	4–2	Alberta	Edmonton, Alberta
1970	Toronto Varsity Blues (4)	Saint Mary's Huskies	3–2	UPEI	(Prince Edward Island) Charlottetown, PEI
1971	Toronto Varsity Blues (5)	Saint Mary's Huskies	5–4	Laurentian	Sudbury, Ontario
1972	Toronto Varsity Blues (6)	Saint Mary's Huskies	5–0	Bishop's & Sherbrooke	Sherbrooke, Quebec
1973	Toronto Varsity Blues (7)	Saint Mary's Huskies	3–2	Toronto	Toronto, Ontario
1974	Waterloo Warriors (1)	Sir George Williams Georgians	6–5 (OT)	Toronto	Toronto, Ontario
1975	Alberta Golden Bears (3)	Toronto Varsity Blues	2–1 ^{†}	Alberta	Edmonton, Alberta
1976	Toronto Varsity Blues (8)	Guelph Gryphons	7–2	Toronto	Toronto, Ontario
1977	Toronto Varsity Blues (9)	Alberta Golden Bears	4–1	Alberta	Edmonton, Alberta
1978	Alberta Golden Bears (4)	Toronto Varsity Blues	6–5	Moncton	Moncton, New Brunswick
1979	Alberta Golden Bears (5)	Dalhousie Tigers	5–1	Concordia	Montreal, Quebec
1980	Alberta Golden Bears (6)	Regina Cougars	7–3	Regina	Regina, Saskatchewan
1981	Moncton Aigles Bleus (1)	Saskatchewan Huskies	4–2	Calgary	Calgary, Alberta
1982	Moncton Aigles Bleus (2)	Saskatchewan Huskies	3–2	Moncton	Moncton, New Brunswick
1983	Saskatchewan Huskies (1)	Concordia Stingers	6–2	Moncton	Moncton, New Brunswick
1984	Toronto Varsity Blues (10)	Concordia Stingers	9–1	UQTR	Trois-Rivières, Quebec
1985	York Yeomen (1)	Alberta Golden Bears	3–2	Toronto	Toronto, Ontario
1986	Alberta Golden Bears (7)	Quebec–Trois-Rivières Patriotes	5–2	Alberta	Edmonton, Alberta
1987	Quebec–Trois-Rivières Patriotes (1)	Saskatchewan Huskies	6–3	Alberta	Edmonton, Alberta
1988	York Yeomen (2)	Western Ontario Mustangs	5–3	Toronto	Toronto, Ontario
1989	York Yeomen (3)	Wilfrid Laurier Golden Hawks	5–2	Toronto	Toronto, Ontario
1990	Moncton Aigles Bleus (3)	Wilfrid Laurier Golden Hawks	2–1	Toronto	Toronto, Ontario
1991	Quebec–Trois-Rivières Patriotes (2)	Alberta Golden Bears	7–2	Toronto	Toronto, Ontario
1992	Alberta Golden Bears (8)	Acadia Axemen	5–2	Toronto	Toronto, Ontario
1993	Acadia Axemen (1)	Toronto Varsity Blues	12–1	Toronto	Toronto, Ontario
1994	Lethbridge Pronghorns (1)	Guelph Gryphons	5–2	Toronto	Toronto, Ontario
1995	Moncton Aigles Bleus (4)	Guelph Gryphons	5–1	Toronto	Toronto, Ontario
1996	Acadia Axemen (2)	Waterloo Warriors	3–2	Toronto	Toronto, Ontario
1997	Guelph Gryphons (1)	New Brunswick Varsity Reds	4–3	Toronto	Toronto, Ontario
1998	New Brunswick Varsity Reds (1)	Acadia Axemen	6–3	Saskatchewan	Saskatoon, Saskatchewan
1999	Alberta Golden Bears (9)	Moncton Aigles Bleus	6–2	Saskatchewan	Saskatoon, Saskatchewan
2000	Alberta Golden Bears (10)	New Brunswick Varsity Reds	5–4 (2OT)	Saskatchewan	Saskatoon, Saskatchewan
2001	Quebec–Trois-Rivières Patriotes (3)	St. Francis Xavier X-Men	5–4	Guelph, Laurier & Waterloo	Waterloo, Ontario
2002	Western Ontario Mustangs (1)	Quebec–Trois-Rivières Patriotes	4–3 (3OT)	Guelph, Laurier & Waterloo	Waterloo, Ontario
2003	Quebec–Trois-Rivières Patriotes (4)	St. Francis Xavier X-Men	3–0	UNB	Fredericton, New Brunswick
2004	St. Francis Xavier X-Men (1)	New Brunswick Varsity Reds	3–2 (2OT)	UNB	Fredericton, New Brunswick
2005	Alberta Golden Bears (11)	Saskatchewan Huskies	4–3 (OT)	Alberta	Edmonton, Alberta
2006	Alberta Golden Bears (12)	Lakehead Thunderwolves	3–2	Alberta	Edmonton, Alberta
2007	New Brunswick Varsity Reds (2)	Moncton Aigles Bleus	3–2 (2OT)	Moncton	Moncton, New Brunswick
2008	Alberta Golden Bears (13)	New Brunswick Varsity Reds	3–2	Moncton	Moncton, New Brunswick
2009	New Brunswick Varsity Reds (3)	Western Ontario Mustangs	4–2	Lakehead	Thunder Bay, Ontario
2010	Saint Mary's Huskies (1)	Alberta Golden Bears	3–2 (OT)	Lakehead	Thunder Bay, Ontario
2011	New Brunswick Varsity Reds (4)	McGill Redmen	4–0	UNB	Fredericton, New Brunswick
2012	McGill Redmen (1)	Western Ontario Mustangs	4–3 (OT)	UNB	Fredericton, New Brunswick
2013	New Brunswick Varsity Reds (5)	Saint Mary's Huskies	2–0	Saskatchewan	Saskatoon, Saskatchewan
2014	Alberta Golden Bears (14)	Saskatchewan Huskies	3–1	Saskatchewan	Saskatoon, Saskatchewan
2015	Alberta Golden Bears (15)	New Brunswick Varsity Reds	6–3	St. FX	Halifax, Nova Scotia
2016	New Brunswick Varsity Reds (6)	St. Francis Xavier X-Men	3–1	Saint Mary's	Halifax, Nova Scotia
2017	New Brunswick Varsity Reds (7)	Saskatchewan Huskies	5–3	UNB	Fredericton, New Brunswick
2018	Alberta Golden Bears (16)	St. Francis Xavier X-Men	4–2	UNB	Fredericton, New Brunswick
2019	New Brunswick Reds (Note: UNB Reds shortened their name from UNB Varsity Reds as of 2018) (8)	Alberta Golden Bears	4–2	Lethbridge	Lethbridge, Alberta
2020	Cancelled after first two (of eight) games due to COVID-19 pandemic				
2021	Cancelled due to COVID-19 pandemic				
2022	Quebec–Trois-Rivières Patriotes (5)	Alberta Golden Bears	5–4 (2OT)	Acadia	Wolfville, Nova Scotia
2023	New Brunswick Reds (9)	Alberta Golden Bears	3–0	UPEI	(Prince Edward Island) Charlottetown, PEI
2024	New Brunswick Reds (10)	Quebec–Trois-Rivières Patriotes	4–0	TMU	Toronto, Ontario
2025	Ottawa Gee-Gees (1)	Concordia Stingers	3–2	Ottawa	Ottawa, Ontario
2026	Quebec–Trois-Rivières Patriotes (6)	Saint Mary's Huskies	3-2 (OT)	Saint Mary’s	Halifax, Nova Scotia
2027				UQTR	Trois-Rivières, Quebec
2028				UNB	Fredericton, New Brunswick

† The championship round was a best-of-three series

== Finals appearances ==
These tables rank appearances in the final championship game.

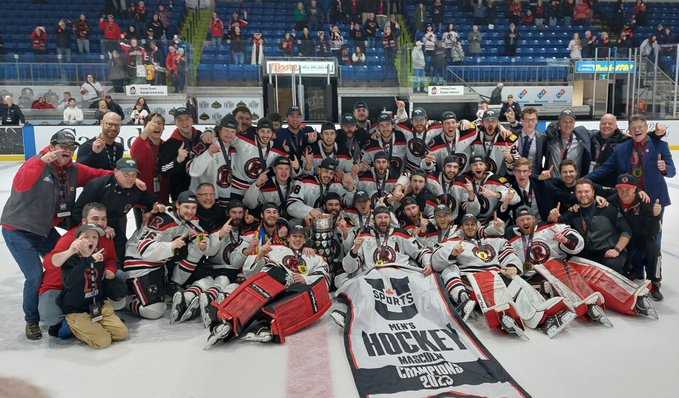
The UNB Reds after winning the 2023 University Cup in Charlottetown, PEI on March 19, 2023

=== By team ===
Appearances by team
Appearances	Team	Wins	Losses	Win %
24	Alberta Golden Bears	16	8	.666
13	Toronto Varsity Blues	10	3	.769
15	UNB Reds (Note: UNB Reds shortened their name from UNB Varsity Reds as of 2018.)	10	5	.666
7	Saskatchewan Huskies	1	6	.142
6	Moncton Aigles Bleus	4	2	.666
9	UQTR Patriotes	6	3	.667
7	Saint Mary's Huskies	1	6	.143
5	St. Francis Xavier X-Men	1	4	.200
4	Acadia Axemen	2	2	.500
4	Guelph Gryphons	1	3	.250
4	Western Mustangs	1	3	.250
3	York Lions	3	0	1.000
3	Sir George Williams Georgians (Note: Sir George Williams University merged with Loyola College in 1974 to create Concordia University.)	0	3	.000
2	McGill Redbirds	1	1	.500
2	Waterloo Warriors	1	1	.500
3	Concordia Stingers	0	3	.000
2	Wilfrid Laurier Golden Hawks	0	2	.000
1	Lethbridge Pronghorns	1	0	1.000
1	Manitoba Bisons	1	0	1.000
1	McMaster Marauders	1	0	1.000
1	Ottawa Gee-Gees	1	0	1.000
1	Dalhousie Tigers	0	1	.000
1	Lakehead Thunderwolves	0	1	.000
1	Laurentian Voyageurs	0	1	.000
1	Loyola Warriors	0	1	.000
1	Regina Cougars	0	1	.000
1	St. Dunstan's Saints (Note: St. Dunstan's University merged with Prince of Wales College in 1969 to form the University of Prince Edward Island.)	0	1	.000
1	UBC Thunderbirds	0	1	.000
124	Total for 28 teams	62	62	

=== By team's province ===
Appearances by team's province
Appearances	Province	Teams	Wins	Losses	Win %
32	Ontario	10	18	14	.548
25	Alberta	2	17	8	.680
21	New Brunswick	2	14	7	.666
17	Nova Scotia	4	4	13	.235
18	Quebec	5	7	11	.389
8	Saskatchewan	2	1	7	.125
1	Manitoba	1	1	0	1.000
1	British Columbia	1	0	1	.000
1	Prince Edward Island	1	0	1	.000
124	Total for 9 provinces	28	62	62	

The only province missing from this list, Newfoundland and Labrador, has only one U Sports member, Memorial University of Newfoundland. Memorial dropped their varsity men's hockey team after the 1981–82 season.

== Location ==
=== By city ===
Tournament locations by city
City	Hosted	Most recent
Toronto, Ontario	15	2024
Edmonton, Alberta	7	2006
Fredericton, New Brunswick	6	2018
Moncton, New Brunswick	5	2008
Saskatoon, Saskatchewan	5	2014
Halifax, Nova Scotia	4 (Note: Halifax includes 2020, as it did host the teams and the first two (of eight) games before the tournament was cancelled due to the COVID-19 pandemic)	2026
Calgary, Alberta	2	1981
Kingston, Ontario	2	1964
Montreal, Quebec	2	1979
Sudbury, Ontario	2	1971
Thunder Bay, Ontario	2	2010
Waterloo, Ontario	2	2002
Charlottetown, Prince Edward Island	2 (Note: Charlottetown does not include 2021, as the tournament was cancelled in its entirety, five months before its scheduled start, due to the COVID-19 pandemic)	2023
Lethbridge, Alberta	1	2019
Ottawa, Ontario	1	2025
Regina, Saskatchewan	1	1980
Sherbrooke, Quebec	1	1972
Trois-Rivières, Quebec	1	1984
Winnipeg, Manitoba	1	1965
Wolfville, Nova Scotia	1	2022
Total for 20 Cities	63	2026

=== By province ===
Tournament locations by province
Province	Hosted	Most recent
Ontario	24	2025
New Brunswick	11	2018
Alberta	10	2019
Saskatchewan	6	2014
Nova Scotia	5	2026
Quebec	4	1984
Manitoba	1	1965
Prince Edward Island	2	2023
Total for 8 Provinces	63	2026

British Columbia is the only province to have a team play in the championship final (UBC Thunderbirds were runners-up in the original 1963 competition, nothing else since then), but to never host the championships. The other province missing from this list, Newfoundland and Labrador, had not yet hosted yet when it withdrew from varsity men's hockey after the 1981–82 season.

== Awards ==
In addition to the University Cup, the Major W.J. "Danny" McLeod Award is presented following the conclusion of the tournament to the individual deemed Most Valuable Player.

Major McLeod was the overall athletic director at the Royal Military College of Canada (RMC), was the coach of RMC's ice hockey team, and simultaneously coached two Kingston teams in the Ontario Hockey Association – the Kingston Frontenacs (Junior B) and the Kingston Aces (Senior A). McLeod was instrumental in establishing the Canadian Intercollegiate Athletic Union (CIAU) in 1961, operating the CIAU from his office at RMC as the first CIAU Secretary-Treasurer. He helped create the national university ice hockey championship tournament, which was hosted by RMC for its first two years (1963 and 1964).

Major W.J. "Danny" McLeod Award winners
Year	Player	Position	Team
1963	Bill Mahoney	Forward	McMaster Marlins
1964	Dave Dies	Defenceman	Sir George Williams Georgians (Note: The Award winner was not from that year's Cup-winning champion)
1965	no MVP selected		
1966	Tom Purser	Goaltender	St. Francis Xavier X-Men
1967	(data, if any, unavailable)		
1968	Ron Cebryk	Forward	Alberta Golden Bears
1969	John Wright (Note: John Wright is the only multiple-time winner of the Award (1969, 1972))	Forward	Toronto Varsity Blues
1970	Chuck Goddard	Goaltender	Saint Mary's Huskies
1971	Ron Hindson	Forward	Saint Mary's Huskies
1972	John Wright	Forward	Toronto Varsity Blues
1973	Gord Davies	Forward	Toronto Varsity Blues
1974	Bernie Wolfe	Goaltender	Sir George Williams Georgians
1975	Dale Henwood	Goaltender	Alberta Golden Bears
1976	Kent Ruhnke	Forward	Toronto Varsity Blues
1977	Rocci Pagnello	Defenceman	Toronto Varsity Blues
1978	Kevin Primeau	Forward	Alberta Golden Bears
1979	Dave Hindmarch	Forward	Alberta Golden Bears
1980	Chris Helland	Forward	Alberta Golden Bears
1981	Benoit Fortier	Goaltender	Moncton Aigles Bleus
1982	Alain Grenier	Forward	Moncton Aigles Bleus
1983	Willie Desjardins	Forward	Saskatchewan Huskies
1984	André Hidi	Forward	Toronto Varsity Blues
1985	Don McLaren	Forward	York Yeomen
1986	Dennis Cranston	Forward	Alberta Golden Bears
1987	Marc Gervais	Forward	UQTR Patriotes
1988	Brian Gray	Forward	York Yeomen
1989	Mark Applewhaite	Goaltender	York Yeomen
1990	Rob Dopson	Goaltender	Wilfrid Laurier Golden Hawks
1991	Denis Desbiens	Goaltender	UQTR Patriotes
1992	Garth Premak	Defenceman	Alberta Golden Bears
1993	George Dupont	Forward	Acadia Axemen
1994	Trevor Ellerman	Forward	Lethbridge Pronghorns
1995	Dominic Rhéaume	Forward	Moncton Aigles Bleus
1996	Greg Clancy	Forward	Acadia Axemen
1997	Matt Mullin	Goaltender	Guelph Gryphons
1998	Chris Zanutto	Defenceman	UNB Varsity Reds
1999	Cam Danyluk	Forward	Alberta Golden Bears
2000	Kevin Marsh	Forward	Alberta Golden Bears
2001	Alexandre Tremblay	Forward	UQTR Patriotes
2002	Mike D'Alessandro	Goaltender	Western Ontario Mustangs
2003	Éric Desjardins	Goaltender	UQTR Patriotes
2004	Mike Mole	Goaltender	St. Francis Xavier X-Men
2005	Ben Thomson	Forward	Alberta Golden Bears
2006	Harlan Anderson	Defenceman	Alberta Golden Bears
2007	Yvan Busque	Forward	Moncton Aigles Bleus
2008	Ian McDonald	Forward	Alberta Golden Bears
2009	Lachlan MacIntosh	Forward	UNB Varsity Reds
2010	Andrew Hotham	Defenceman	Saint Mary's Huskies
2011	Luke Gallant	Defenceman	UNB Varsity Reds
2012	Francis Verreault-Paul	Forward	McGill Redmen
2013	Tyler Carroll	Forward	UNB Varsity Reds
2014	Derek Hulak	Forward	Saskatchewan Huskies
2015	Kruise Reddick	Forward	Alberta Golden Bears
2016	Philippe Halley	Forward	UNB Varsity Reds
2017	Philippe Maillet	Forward	UNB Varsity Reds
2018	Stephane Legault	Forward	Alberta Golden Bears
2019	Alex Dubeau	Goaltender	UNB Reds (Note: UNB Reds shortened their name from UNB Varsity Reds as of 2018)
2020	Not awarded, only two (of 8) games played due to COVID-19 pandemic		
2021	No tournament due to COVID-19 pandemic		
2022	Alexis Gravel	Goaltender	UQTR Patriotes
2023	Samuel Richard	Goaltender	UNB Reds
2024	Brady Gilmour	Forward	UNB Reds
2025	Franky Lapenna	Goaltender	Ottawa Gee-Gees
2026	Conor Frenette	Forward	UQTR Patriotes

== See also ==
- NCAA Division I men's ice hockey tournament
- College ice hockey
