= Andrew H. McCain Arena =

Arena on the campus of Acadia University in Wolfville, Nova Scotia

Coordinates: 45°5′25.6″N 64°22′7.6″W

- Interactive map of Andrew H. McCain Arena
- Former names: Acadia Arena
- Owner: Acadia University
- Capacity: 1,800 (seated, hockey); 2,800 (Concerts)
- Surface: 200' X 100'

Construction
- Opened: 1988

Tenants
- Acadia Axemen (AUS) 1988-present, Wolfville Wolves (arena football)

Andrew H. McCain Arena (formerly Acadia Arena) is a multi-purpose arena in Wolfville, Nova Scotia, Canada. It can seat 1,800 spectators for ice events and an extra 1,000 on the ice surface for other events. It was built in 1988, and features an Olympic sized ice surface. It is home to the Acadia Axemen ice hockey team. Has also hosted exhibition games featuring Team Canada, NHL old-timers and the American Hockey League. Curling Canada has held trials for its winter Olympic teams at the arena. The Soviets were based at the site for the 1990 World Figure Skating Championships, which were held in Halifax. The arena has also hosted many concerts, and the eclipse scene from Dolores Claiborne was filmed here.
