= VisitLethbridge.com Arena =

Multi-use indoor arena in Lethbridge, Alberta

Coordinates: 49.666947°N 112.805428°W

- Lethbridge Sportsplex
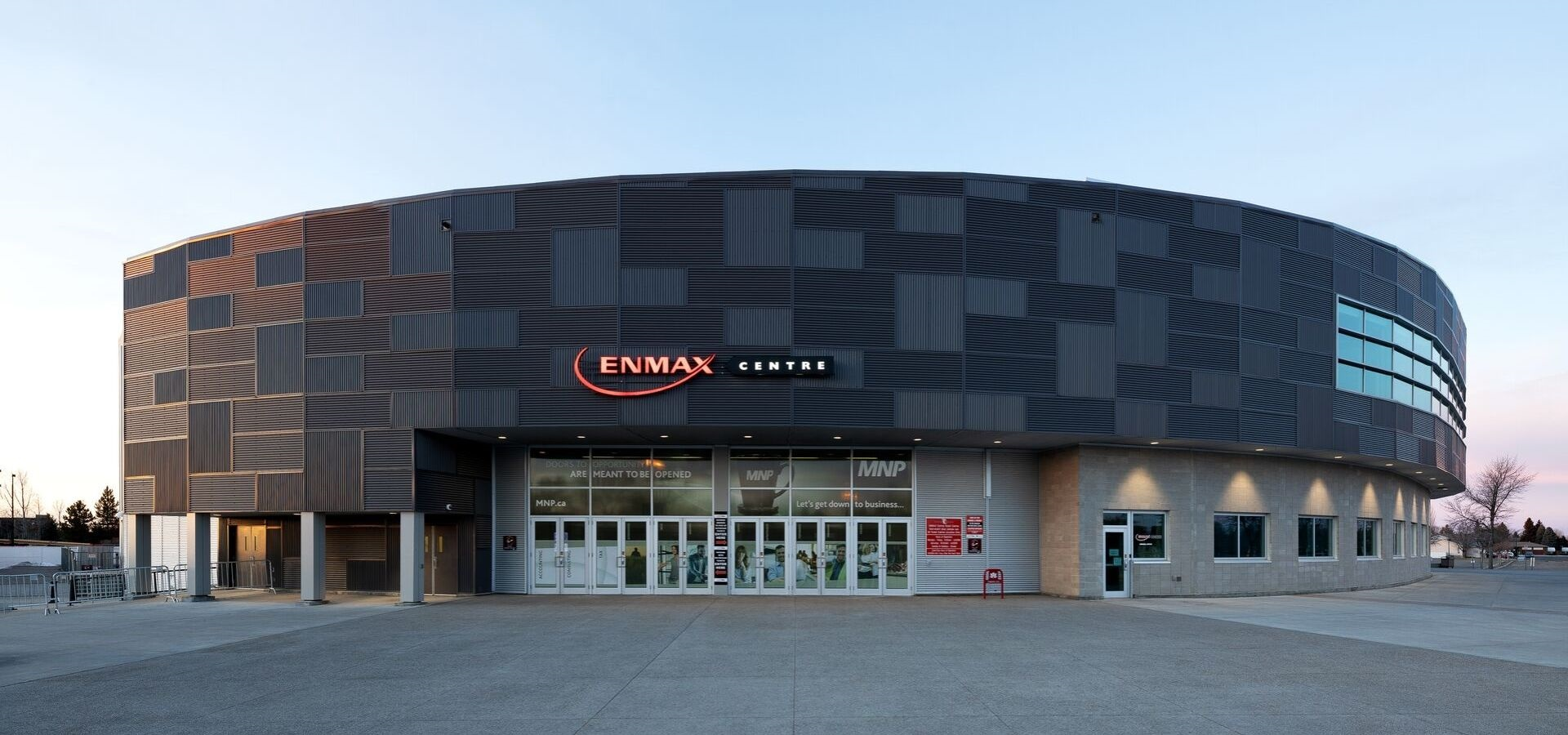

- Location within Alberta Location within Canada
- Former names: Canada Games Sportsplex (1974-2000); ENMAX Centre (2000-2024)
- Address: 2510 Scenic Drive South; Lethbridge, Alberta
- Location: Lethbridge, Alberta, Canada
- Owner: City of Lethbridge
- Operator: City of Lethbridge
- Capacity: 1,100 in small theatre 5,479 (Hockey); 6,500 in reserve seating 7,100 in festival seating
- Surface: Multi-surface

Construction
- Groundbreaking: 1972
- Opened: September 1974
- Cost: C$4.25 million ($26.6 million in 2025 dollars)
- Architects: Phillips, Barratt, Hillier, Jones and Partners
- General contractor: Wesbridge/Gillett

Tenants
- Lethbridge Broncos (WHL) (1974–1986); Alberta Dusters (CBA) (1980–1982); Lethbridge Hurricanes (WHL) (1987–present)

Website
- http://www.visitlethbridgearena.ca/

The VisitLethbridge.com Arena (formerly Canada Games Sportsplex and ENMAX Centre) is a 5,479-seat multi-purpose arena, in Lethbridge, Alberta, Canada.

It was built to host the 1975 Canada Games and is home to the Lethbridge Hurricanes, of the WHL.

In the early days the facility also included a speedskating rink before it was converted into an outdoor sports field with capacity for 2,000 people. It has since been converted into parking.

In 1997, the 58,000-square-foot (5,400 m^{2}) Servus Sports Centre (formerly the Lethbridge Soccer Centre) was built directly to the south.

The facility has hosted concerts, three-ring circuses, multicultural events, national and international curling championships, basketball events, banquets and skating events. Comedian Jerry Seinfeld performed to a sold-out crowd in 2011. Elton John also performed here in April 2012.

As of August 6, 2024, the naming rights were acquired by the Lethbrige Lodging Association and will be called the VisitLethbridge.com Arena.

== Building enhancements ==
Renovations to upgrade the facility began in May 2009 and were completed in spring 2012. Among the improvements are an expansion of 40,809 square feet (3,791.3 m^{2}), the addition of 18 luxury suites, improved concessions and washrooms, a new press box, and a restaurant/lounge overlooking the ice. The total budget for the building enhancement was $33.722 million and was to be shared by the City of Lethbridge, a Municipal Sustainability Initiative Grant, and a Major Community Facilities Grant.

A $1,216,500 video scoreboard was installed and was funded by the City of Lethbridge, the Lethbridge Hurricanes, and savings to the original project budget.
