= Lakehead Thunderwolves =

Lakehead University athletic teams

- University: Lakehead University
- Nickname: Wolfie
- Association: U Sports
- Conference: Ontario University Athletics
- Athletic director: Tom Warden
- Location: Thunder Bay, Ontario
- Ice hockey arena: Fort William Gardens
- Soccer stadium: Fort William Stadium
- Outdoor track and field venue: Fort William Stadium
- Colours: Blue, White, and Yellow
- Mascot: Wolf
- Website: thunderwolves.ca
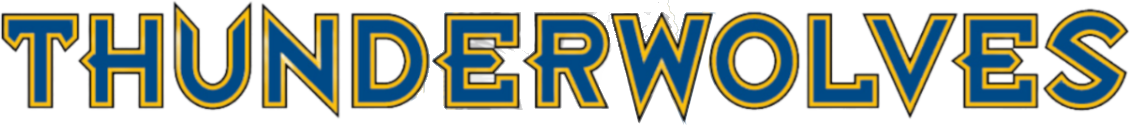

The Lakehead Thunderwolves are the U Sports varsity athletic teams that represent Lakehead University in Thunder Bay, Ontario, Canada.

== Overview ==
The Lakehead Thunderwolves are perennial powers in the OUA and U Sports in Nordic Skiing and wrestling. The women's and men's Nordic ski teams won both the OUA conference and CIS-CCUNC national team championships in both 2005 and 2006. The women's and men's team four-peated for the OUA Championships in 2008 while the women won their fifth consecutive CIS-CCUNC national championship. The men's wrestling team is ranked in the U Sports Top 10 each year and the women's team is ranked in the North American Top 15. As of 2012, the women have continued their string of dominant performances, having now accomplished the 8-peat for CCUNC championships.

Their men's hockey program, resumed in 2001–02, annually leads the U Sports in attendance with minor pro attendance numbers (3000 per game) and has become one of the better programs in U Sports men's ice hockey. The team won the OUA Queen's Cup conference championship in 2005–06, defeating the McGill Redmen in the one-game final, and subsequently placed second at the National Championships in Edmonton, Alberta. In each of its seven seasons, the hockey team has won at least one playoff round and has gone 14–2 on home ice in the playoffs. The Thunderwolves have qualified for the National Championship twice in seven seasons of play. They hosted the National Championships in 2009 and 2010. It has an intense, and at times brutally violent, rivalry with the Western Mustangs. Lakehead University previously had a men's ice hockey team called the Lakehead Nor'Westers. The 1966–67 team coached by Hank Akervall and led by captain Dave Siciliano won the International Collegiate Hockey Association (ICHA) championship.

Men's and women's basketball, women's volleyball, track, and cross country have had varying degrees of success, and most of these programs have shown improvement over the past couple seasons.

The alpine skiing team (a club sport) competes as one of a small handful of Canadian schools in the United States Collegiate Ski and Snowboard Association (USCSA), including University of British Columbia and a few others.

== Varsity sports ==
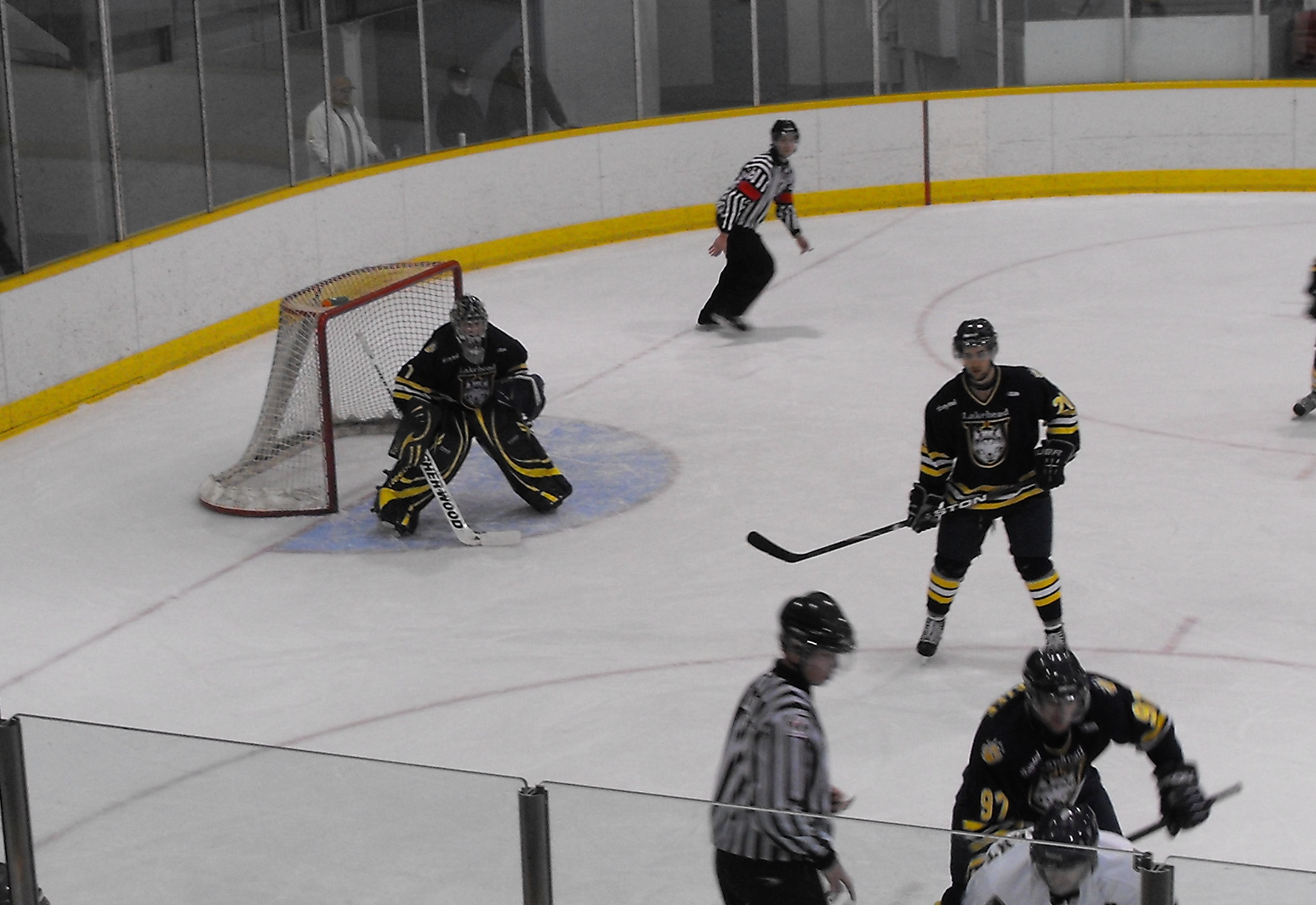
Men's 2012 Playoff Game vs. Windsor Lancers.

Men's sports	Women's sports
Basketball	Basketball
Cross country	Cross country
Ice hockey	Nordic skiing
Nordic skiing	Track and field
Track and field	Volleyball
Wrestling	Wrestling

== Broadcasts ==
Lakehead broadcasts many games with live video webcasts, which can be accessed off Lakehead's two athletic sites. All sports are broadcast except Nordic skiing. Basketball is carried live on campus radio station CILU-FM and webcast on SSN Canada. Men's away hockey games used to be carried by commercial station Rock94, but just recently the station discontinued this service.
