= Queen's Cup (ice hockey) =

University ice hockey trophy in Canada

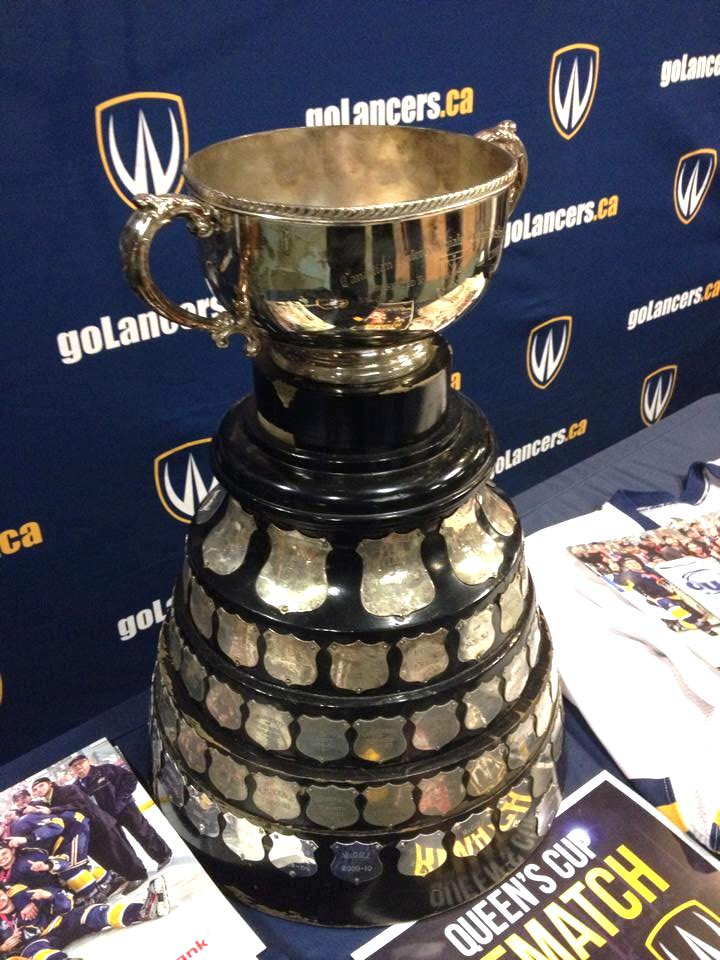
- The Queen's Cup during 2014-15 season
- Sport: U Sports men's ice hockey
- League: Ontario University Athletics
- Competition: OUA men's ice hockey tournament
- Awarded for: Playoff champion of OUA men's ice hockey

History
- First award: 1903
- First winner: McGill Redmen (18) (now known as the McGill Redbirds)
- Most wins: Toronto Varsity Blues (41)
- Most recent: UQTR Patriotes (12)
- Website: www.oua.ca/sports/mice/index

The Queen's Cup is a trophy awarded annually to the champion in men's ice hockey of the Ontario University Athletics conference of U Sports. It has been awarded since 1903 to the champion between Ontario and Quebec universities. It is the second-oldest ice hockey trophy still being awarded, after the Stanley Cup.

The QUAA (now named the Réseau du sport étudiant du Québec, RSEQ) ceased to operate a university hockey league after the 1986–87 season. The conference's three remaining teams at that point (McGill Redmen, UQTR Patriotes, and Concordia Stingers) joined, and remain, in the OUA conference. One of the conditions of the merger was the Queen's Cup, representing the OUA champion, must be challenged for at an OUA institution – as such, when the OUA-East champion hosts such a game and that school is based in Quebec, the game is hosted by the OUA-West team, while the OUA-East team has 'home' standing (last change).

== History ==
For the 1902–03 season, McGill University, Queen's University and the University of Toronto founded the Canadian Intercollegiate Hockey Union. The Queen's Cup, emblematic of the CIHU championship was donated by Queen's University of Kingston, Ontario. The Queen's Cup was not presented during the war years of 1915–16, 1916–17, 1917–18, 1918–19, 1940–41, 1941–42, 1942–43, 1943–44, nor 1944–45. The first winner other than the founders was the Université de Montréal in 1949. By the 1960s, other universities, including Ontario Agricultural College (Guelph), McMaster, Waterloo and Western were granted membership and became eligible to win the Cup. Other universities have since joined the CIHU, now known as the OUA conference. The original Cup was retired in 2000 to the Hockey Hall of Fame. The 2021 championship was cancelled due to the COVID-19 pandemic in Canada.

Season	Champion	Record (W-L-T)/Series
1903	McGill Redmen	2-1-1
1904	Queen's Golden Gaels	3-1-0
1905	McGill Redmen	3-1-0
1906	Queen's Golden Gaels	3-1-0
1907	Toronto Varsity Blues	3-1-0
1908	Toronto Varsity Blues	6-0-0
1909	Queen's Golden Gaels	5-1-0
1910	Queen's Golden Gaels	5-2-0
1911	Toronto Varsity Blues	21-11 (2 gms vs. LU@M)
1912	McGill Redmen	4-0-0
1913	Toronto Varsity Blues	3-1-0
1914	Queen's Golden Gaels	3-1-0
1915	Toronto Varsity Blues	4-0-0
1920	Toronto Varsity Blues	4-1-0
1921	Toronto Varsity Blues	4-0-0
1922	Toronto Varsity Blues	4-0-0
1923	Toronto Varsity Blues	5-1-0
1924	Toronto Varsity Blues	5-1-0
1925	Toronto Varsity Blues	5-0-0
1926	Toronto Varsity Blues	6-0-0
1927	Toronto Varsity Blues	9-2 (2 gms vs. McG)
1928	Toronto Varsity Blues	3-1-0
1929	Toronto Varsity Blues	9-3 (2 gms vs. McG)
1930	McGill Redmen	3-2 (2 gms vs. Tor)
1931	McGill Redmen	6-4 (2 gms vs. Tor)
1932	Toronto Varsity Blues	4-3 (2 gms vs. McG)
1933	McGill Redmen	3-0-1
1934	McGill Redmen	9-4 (2 gms vs. Tor)
1935	McGill Redmen	4-0-0
1936	McGill Redmen	15-3 (2 gms vs. Tor)
1937	McGill Redmen	6-0-0
1938	McGill Redmen	5-1-0
1939	McGill Redmen	5-1-0
1940	Toronto Varsity Blues	4-0-0
1946	McGill Redmen	6-1-0
1947	Toronto Varsity Blues	7-2-1
1948	Toronto Varsity Blues	10-2-0
1949	Montreal Carabins	10-2-0
1950	Montreal Carabins	11-1-0
1951	Toronto Varsity Blues	5-1-0
1952	Montreal Carabins	8-3-1
1953	Montreal Carabins	7-4-1
1954	Laval Rouge et Or	8-3-1
1955	Toronto Varsity Blues	11-0-1
1956	Toronto Varsity Blues	9-3-0
1957	Toronto Varsity Blues	9-3-0
1958	Toronto Varsity Blues	9-3-0
1959	Toronto Varsity Blues	10-2-0
1960	Laval Rouge et Or	13-1-0
1961	Laval Rouge et Or	9-3-0

=== Playoff era ===
Season	Champion	Runner-up	Score/Series
1962	Toronto Varsity Blues	McMaster Marauders	13–10 (2 gms)
1963	McMaster Marauders	Laval Rouge et Or	12–7 (2 gms)
1964	Toronto Varsity Blues	No playoffs	9–1–2
1965	Montreal Carabins	Queen's Golden Gaels	4–3
1966	Toronto Varsity Blues	No playoffs	13–2–1
1967	Toronto Varsity Blues	Waterloo Warriors	9–4
1968	Toronto Varsity Blues	Waterloo Warriors	8–1
1969	Toronto Varsity Blues	Waterloo Warriors	4–0
1970	Toronto Varsity Blues	Waterloo Warriors	7–4
1971	Toronto Varsity Blues	Queen's Golden Gaels	5–4
1972	Toronto Varsity Blues	York Yeomen	6–2
1973	Toronto Varsity Blues	Western Mustangs	8–1
1974	Waterloo Warriors	Western Mustangs	6–4
1975	Toronto Varsity Blues	York Yeomen	4–3
1976	Guelph Gryphons	York Yeomen	5–4
1977	Toronto Varsity Blues	York Yeomen	3–2
1978	Toronto Varsity Blues	Laurier Golden Hawks	2–0 (games)
1979	Guelph Gryphons	McMaster Marauders	
1980	Guelph Gryphons		
1981	Queen's Golden Gaels	Western Mustangs	2–0 (games)
1982	Toronto Varsity Blues	Guelph Gryphons	2–1 (games)
1983	Laurier Golden Hawks	Toronto Varsity Blues	2–0 (games)
1984	Toronto Varsity Blues	Western Mustangs	2–0 (games)
1985	York Yeomen	Western Mustangs	2–1 (games)
1986	York Yeomen	Laurier Golden Hawks	2–0 (games)
1987	York Yeomen	Western Mustangs	2–1 (games)

=== Three Division format ===
Bolded are Queen's Cup champions, italicized are runner-up, score is championship game only.

Season	East Champion	Central Champion	West Champion	Wildcard	Score
1988	UQTR Patriotes	**York Yeomen**	Windsor Lancers	Western Mustangs	5-1
1989	UQTR Patriotes	**Laurier Golden Hawks**	Brock Badgers	York Yeomen	3-0

=== East vs. West format ===
Bolded are Queen's Cup champions.

Season	East Champion	West Champion	Score/Series	Attendance
1990	UQTR Patriotes	**Laurier Golden Hawks**	0-2 (games)	
1991	**UQTR Patriotes**	Waterloo Warriors	2-0 (games)	
1992	**UQTR Patriotes**	Laurier Golden Hawks	8-2	
1993	**Toronto Varsity Blues**	Guelph Gryphons	5-4	
1994	**Guelph Gryphons**	Western Mustangs	2-1	
1995	Guelph Gryphons	**Western Mustangs**	4-5	
1996	UQTR Patriotes	**Waterloo Warriors**	1-5	
1997	**Guelph Gryphons**	York Yeomen	3-0	
1998	UQTR Patriotes	**Windsor Lancers**	1-2	
1999	**UQTR Patriotes**	York Yeomen	7-0	
2000	**UQTR Patriotes**	Western Mustangs	3-2	
2001	**UQTR Patriotes**	Western Mustangs	4-3	
2002	**UQTR Patriotes**	Western Mustangs	5-4	
2003	**UQTR Patriotes**	York Lions	7-4	
2004	Ottawa Gee-Gees	**York Lions**	2-3	
2005	UQTR Patriotes	**Western Mustangs**	0-4	
2006	McGill Redmen	**Lakehead Thunderwolves**	0-4	3,735
2007	**UQTR Patriotes**	Laurier Golden Hawks	5-3	1,635
2008	**McGill Redmen**	Brock Badgers	4-1	1,378
2009	McGill Redmen	**Western Mustangs**	1-2	689
2010	**McGill Redmen**	Lakehead Thunderwolves	3-1	3,735
2011	**McGill Redmen**	Western Mustangs	6-2	3,068
2012	**McGill Redmen**	Western Mustangs	4-1	1,751
2013	**UQTR Patriotes**	Waterloo Warriors	4-1	670
2014	McGill Redmen	**Windsor Lancers**	2-3	683
2015	UQTR Patriotes	**Guelph Gryphons**	0-4	1,300
2016	**UQTR Patriotes**	Western Mustangs	4-3 OT	1,067
2017	Queen's Gaels	**York Lions**	3-4	1,221
2018	**McGill Redmen**	Brock Badgers	5-1	1,517
2019	**Queen's Gaels**	Guelph Gryphons	4-1	2,900
2020	Ottawa Gee-Gees	**Guelph Gryphons**	2-1 3OT	1600
2021	Cancelled due to COVID-19 pandemic			
2022	**UQTR Patriotes**	Brock Badgers	3–1	1000
2023	**UQTR Patriotes**	Windsor Lancers	3–2 (3OT)	856
2024	**UQTR Patriotes**	TMU Bold	3–2 (3OT)	1250
2025	**Concordia Stingers**	TMU Bold	4–1	1,250

Source: McGill University, OUA

== Championships by team ==
The Toronto Varsity Blues have won the most OUA championships with 41, including a record 11 consecutively between the 1914-15 to 1928-29 seasons.

Team	Wins	Last
Toronto Varsity Blues	41	1993
McGill Redbirds	18	2018
UQTR Patriotes	12	2023
Queen's Gaels	7	2019
Guelph Gryphons	7	2020
York Lions	6	2017
Montreal Carabins	5	1965
Laval Rouge et Or	3	1961
Wilfrid Laurier Golden Hawks	3	1990
Western Mustangs	3	2009
Waterloo Warriors	2	1996
Windsor Lancers	2	2014
McMaster Marauders	1	1963
Lakehead Thunderwolves	1	2006
Concordia Stingers	1	2025

== See also ==
- QOAA men's ice hockey tournament
- OUAA men's ice hockey tournament
- OUA men's ice hockey tournament
- University Cup
- Réseau du sport étudiant du Québec
