= Calgary Dinos men's ice hockey =

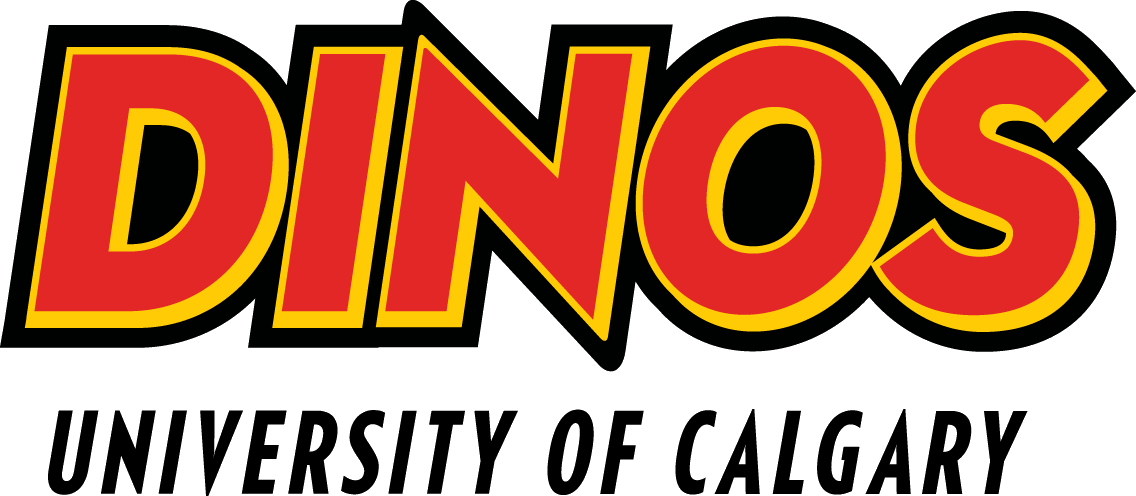
- University: University of Calgary
- Conference: Canada West
- First season: 1964–65
- Head coach: Mark Howell; Since 2009–10 season
- Assistant coaches: Jamie Fox; Brad Werenka; Lane Zablocki; Brad Kirkwood
- Arena: Father David Bauer Olympic Arena; Calgary, Alberta
- Colors: Red and Gold

U Sports tournament appearances
- 1974, 1976, 1980, 1981, 1986, 1988, 1990, 1995, 1996, 2000, 2011, 2015, 2023, 2024

Conference tournament champions
- 1974, 1976, 1980, 1986, 1988, 1990, 1995, 1996, 2023

Conference regular season champions
- 1970, 1974, 1976, 1981, 1987, 1988, 1989, 1990, 1991, 1995, 1996, 1997, 2023

The Calgary Dinos men's ice hockey team is an ice hockey team representing the Calgary Dinos athletics program of University of Calgary. The team is a member of the Canada West Universities Athletic Association conference and compete in U Sports. The Dinos play their home games at the Father David Bauer Olympic Arena in Calgary, Alberta.

== History ==
Shortly before it was renamed as the 'University of Calgary', the Dinos ice hockey team hit the ice for the first time. For their inaugural season in 1964–65, the team joined the Western Canadian Intercollegiate Athletic Association (WCIAA), alongside its parent institution, Alberta. They did so in part due to the temporary loss of British Columbia as a league member in order to keep the conference as a viable outfit. As may be expected for a program who had never before fielded a team, the Dinos got off to a slow start; Calgary went winless in its first three seasons, however, Al Rollins was finally able to lead the club to its first wins in year four.

The arrival of George Kingston in 1968 was the turning point for the program. In his first season, Calgary posted a winning record and then finished in a tie for first the very next year. Despite a few near-misses, Calgary was unable to make any appearances in the University Cup tournament until the mid 1970s. By then, the team had become a founding member of Canada West Universities Athletic Association and would remain one of the top teams while Kingston was in charge.

Kingston left in 1988 for the NHL, turning the team over to Willie Desjardins. Despite the team posing winning records in each season, they made just one trip to the national tournament over a 6-year span. Desjardins left for professional opportunities, leaving Tim Bothwell to take over in 1994. He promptly led the Dinos to back-to-back Canada West championships, as well as a third trip to the University Cup in 2000, before accepting an assistant coaching position in the NHL. The program saw less success under Scott Atkinson's 9-year run with no league titles and the first losing records since the mid-80s.

In 2009, Calgary appointed Mark Howell as the 8th head coach and it didn't take long before the team was able to recapture its former glory. The Dinos promptly returned to their winning ways and ended their University Cup drought in 2011. Several additional trips followed, however, the team had a bit of a setback in 2018 when they were forced to forfeit 6 games for using an ineligible player. However, since the team was proactive in reporting the violation, no additional sanctions were imposed.

After the COVID-19 pandemic forced the cancellation of the 2020–21 season, Calgary returned to the top of the conference, winning the league championship in 2023, its first in 27 years. Despite all of the team's success in Canada West, Calgary has had a very difficult time winning at the national level. Calgary had some success in the 70s, but the team had lost 13 consecutive University Cup games, dating back to 1986 (as of 2024).

=== Senior hockey ===
Calgary played senior hockey in various leagues from 1967 until 1970. They did so concurrently with their college schedule.

== Season-by-season results ==
Note: GP = Games played, W = Wins, L = Losses, T = Ties, OTL = Overtime Losses, SOL = Shootout Losses, Pts = Points

U Sports Champion	U Sports Semifinalist	Conference regular season champions	Conference Division Champions	Conference Playoff Champions

Season	Conference	Regular Season													Conference Tournament Results	National Tournament Results
Season	Conference	Conference								Overall					Conference Tournament Results	National Tournament Results
Season	Conference	GP	W	L	T	OTL	SOL	Pts*	Finish	GP	W	L	T	%	Conference Tournament Results	National Tournament Results
Al Rollins (1964–1968)
1964–65	WCIAA	12	0	12	0	–	–	0	4th	12	0	12	0	.000		
1965–66	WCIAA	12	0	12	0	–	–	0	4th	12	0	12	0	.000		
1966–67	WCIAA	16	0	16	0	–	–	0	5th	16	0	16	0	.000		
1967–68	WCIAA	16	2	14	0	–	–	4	5th	16	2	14	0	.125		
George Kingston (1968–1974)
1968–69	WCIAA	20	11	9	0	–	–	22	3rd	20	11	9	0	.550		
1969–70	WCIAA	14	11	3	0	–	–	22	1st	18	13	5	0	.722	Won Semifinal series, 2–0 (British Columbia); Lost Championship series, 0–2 (Alberta)	
1970–71	WCIAA	20	13	7	0	–	–	26	3rd	23	14	9	0	.609	Lost Semifinal series, 1–2 (British Columbia)	
1971–72	WCIAA	20	15	5	0	–	–	30	2nd	22	16	6	0	.727	Won Semifinal, 6–5 (Winnipeg); Lost Championship, 1–3 (Alberta)	
1972–73	Canada West	24	16	8	0	–	–	32	T–2nd	24	16	8	0	.667		
1973–74	Canada West	18	14	4	0	–	–	22	1st	24	18	6	0	.750	Won Championship series, 2–0 (Alberta)	Won West Quarterfinal series, 2–0 (Brandon); Lost Semifinal series, 0–2 (Waterloo)
Gordon Cowan (1974–1975)
1974–75	Canada West	24	11	12	1	–	–	23	3rd	24	11	12	1	.479		
George Kingston (1975–1976)
1975–76	Canada West	24	17	7	0	–	–	32	1st	30	22	8	0	.733	Won Championship series, 2–0 (Alberta)	Won West Regional Semifinal, 6–4 (Brandon); Won West Regional Final, 3–1 (Alberta); Won National First Round, 5–4 (Toronto); Lost National Semifinal, 1–4 (Guelph)
Gordon Cowan (1976–1978)
1976–77	Canada West	24	8	16	0	–	–	16	3rd	24	8	16	0	.333		
1977–78	Canada West	24	11	13	0	–	–	22	3rd	24	11	13	0	.458		
George Kingston (1978–1983)
1978–79	Canada West	24	15	9	0	–	–	30	2nd	27	16	11	0	.593	Lost Championship series, 1–2 (Alberta)	
1979–80	Canada West	29	18	11	0	–	–	36	2nd	33	21	12	0	.636	Won Championship series, 2–0 (Alberta)	Lost Pool 1 Round-robin, 0–2 (Alberta), 5–1 (Concordia)
1980–81	Canada West	24	18	6	0	–	–	20	1st	29	20	9	0	.690	Lost Championship series, 1–2 (Saskatchewan)	Lost Pool 1 Round-robin, 2–5 (Moncton), 6–3 (Brandon)
1981–82	Canada West	24	14	10	0	–	–	28	2nd	26	14	12	0	.538	Lost Championship series, 0–2 (Saskatchewan)	
1982–83	Canada West	24	10	14	0	–	–	20	3rd	24	10	14	0	.417		
Gordon Jones (1983–1984)
1983–84	Canada West	24	11	13	0	–	–	22	3rd	24	11	13	0	.458		
George Kingston (1984–1988)
1984–85	Canada West	24	8	16	0	–	–	16	4th	24	8	16	0	.333		
1985–86	Canada West	28	19	9	0	–	–	38	2nd	36	23	13	0	.639	Won Semifinal series, 2–1 (Manitoba); Won Championship series, 2–1 (Saskatchewan)	Lost Quarterfinal series, 0–2 (Quebec–Trois-Rivières)
1986–87	Canada West	28	23	5	0	–	–	46	1st	33	25	8	0	.758	Won Semifinal series, 2–0 (British Columbia); Lost Championship series, 1–2 (Saskatchewan)	
1987–88	Canada West	28	23	5	0	–	–	46	1st	35	27	8	0	.771	Won Semifinal series, 2–1 (Manitoba); Won Championship series, 2–1 (Alberta)	Lost Semifinal, 3–4 (York)
Willie Desjardins (1988–1994)
1988–89	Canada West	28	21	7	0	–	–	42	T–1st	34	24	10	0	.706	Won Semifinal series, 2–1 (Saskatchewan); Lost Championship series, 1–2 (Alberta)	
1989–90	Canada West	28	21	6	1	–	–	42	1st	34	25	8	1	.750	Won Semifinal series, 2–1 (Regina); Won Championship series, 2–0 (Alberta)	Lost Semifinal, 4–5 (Moncton)
1990–91	Canada West	28	22	5	1	–	–	45	1st	34	24	10	0	.706	Lost Semifinal series, 1–2 (Regina)	
1991–92	Canada West	28	15	11	2	–	–	32	3rd	31	16	13	2	.548	Lost Semifinal series, 1–2 (Alberta)	
1992–93	Canada West	28	17	7	3	–	–	37	3rd	33	22	7	4	.727	Lost Semifinal series, 1–2 (Regina)	
1993–94	Canada West	28	17	7	4	–	–	38	2nd	33	20	9	4	.667	Won Semifinal series, 2–0 (Alberta); Lost Championship series, 1–2 (Lethbridge)	
Tim Bothwell (1994–2001)
1994–95	Canada West	28	20	6	2	–	–	42	1st	33	24	7	2	.758	Won Semifinal series, 2–0 (Lethbridge); Won Championship series, 2–0 (Manitoba)	Lost Semifinal, 1–4 (Guelph)
1995–96	Canada West	28	18	9	1	–	–	37	1st	33	22	10	1	.682	Won Division Final series, 2–0 (Alberta); Won Championship series, 2–0 (Regina)	Lost Semifinal, 2–5 (Waterloo)
1996–97	Canada West	26	21	2	3	–	–	45	1st	28	21	4	3	.804	Lost Division Final series, 0–2 (Alberta)	
1997–98	Canada West	28	13	12	3	–	–	29	4th	33	15	15	3	.500	Won Division Semifinal series, 2–1 (British Columbia); Lost Division Final series, 0–2 (Alberta)	
1998–99	Canada West	28	13	10	5	–	–	31	3rd	33	15	13	5	.530	Won Division Semifinal series, 2–1 (Lethbridge); Lost Division Final series, 0–2 (Alberta)	
1999–00	Canada West	28	16	9	3	–	–	35	3rd	36	20	13	3	.597	Won Division Semifinal series, 2–0 (Lethbridge); Lost Division Final series, 0–2 (Alberta); Won Third Place series, 2–0 (Brandon)	Lost Pool B Round-robin, 2–3 (Quebec–Trois-Rivières), 2–4 (Alberta)
2000–01	Canada West	28	13	12	3	–	–	29	4th	33	15	15	3	.500	Won Division Semifinal series, 2–1 (Lethbridge); Lost Division Final series, 0–2 (Alberta)	
Scott Atkinson (2001–2009)
2001–02	Canada West	28	16	11	1	–	–	33	3rd	32	18	13	1	.578	Won Quarterfinal series, 2–0 (Lethbridge); Lost Semifinal series, 0–2 (Saskatchewan)	
2002–03	Canada West	28	14	12	2	–	–	30	3rd	33	16	15	2	.515	Won Division Semifinal series, 2–1 (Lethbridge); Lost Division Final series, 0–2 (Alberta)	
2003–04	Canada West	28	16	10	2	–	–	34	2nd	33	18	13	2	.576	Won Division Semifinal series, 2–1 (British Columbia); Lost Division Final series, 0–2 (Alberta)	
2004–05	Canada West	28	12	10	6	–	–	30	4th	32	14	12	6	.531	Won Division Semifinal series, 2–0 (British Columbia); Lost Division Final series, 0–2 (Alberta)	
2005–06	Canada West	28	13	13	2	–	–	28	4th	33	15	16	2	.485	Won Division Semifinal series, 2–1 (British Columbia); Lost Division Final series, 0–2 (Alberta)	
2006–07	Canada West	28	11	13	–	4	–	26	6th	33	13	20	0	.394	Won Division Semifinal series, 2–1 (Regina); Lost Division Final series, 0–2 (Saskatchewan)	
2007–08	Canada West	28	16	8	–	4	–	36	3rd	32	18	14	0	.563	Won Quarterfinal series, 2–0 (Regina); Lost Semifinal series, 0–2 (Saskatchewan)	
2008–09	Canada West	28	10	16	–	2	0	22	7th	28	10	18	0	.357		
Mark Howell (2009–Present)
2009–10	Canada West	28	13	9	–	3	3	32	4th	30	13	14	3	.483	Lost Semifinal series, 0–2 (Alberta)	
2010–11	Canada West	28	17	8	–	1	2	37	2nd	35	19	14	2	.571	Won Semifinal series, 2–1 (Saskatchewan); Lost Championship series, 0–2 (Alberta)	Lost Pool B Round-robin, 1–2 (New Brunswick), 2–3 (Western Ontario)
2011–12	Canada West	28	15	11	–	1	1	32	4th	36	20	15	1	.569	Won Quarterfinal series, 2–1 (British Columbia); Won Semifinal series, 2–0 (Manitoba); Lost Championship series, 1–2 (Saskatchewan)	
2012–13	Canada West	28	17	11	–	0	0	34	4th	33	19	14	0	.576	Won Quarterfinal series, 2–1 (British Columbia); Lost Semifinal series, 0–2 (Alberta)	
2013–14	Canada West	28	21	4	–	3	0	45	2nd	33	23	10	0	.697	Won Semifinal series, 2–1 (Manitoba); Lost Championship series, 0–2 (Alberta)	
2014–15	Canada West	28	20	8	–	0	0	40	2nd	34	22	12	0	.647	Won Semifinal series, 2–1 (Mount Royal); Lost Championship series, 0–2 (Alberta)	Lost Quarterfinal, 1–3 (Guelph)
2015–16	Canada West	28	12	12	–	4	0	28	T–4th	33	14	19	0	.424	Won Quarterfinal series, 2–1 (Manitoba); Lost Semifinal series, 0–2 (Saskatchewan)	
2016–17	Canada West	28	18	9	–	1	0	39	3rd	32	20	12	0	.625	Won Quarterfinal series, 2–0 (British Columbia); Lost Semifinal series, 0–2 (Alberta)	
2017–18	Canada West	28	12	13	–	3	0	27	5th ^{¿}	34	15	19	0	.441	Won Quarterfinal series, 2–1 (British Columbia); Lost Semifinal series, 1–2 (Saskatchewan)	
2018–19	Canada West	28	18	7	–	2	1	39	3rd	32	20	11	1	.641	Won Quarterfinal series, 2–0 (Lethbridge); Lost Semifinal series, 0–2 (Alberta)	
2019–20	Canada West	28	18	7	–	3	0	39	3rd	32	20	12	0	.625	Won Quarterfinal series, 2–0 (Manitoba); Lost Semifinal series, 0–2 (Saskatchewan)	
2020–21	Season cancelled due to COVID-19 pandemic															
2021–22	Canada West	20	12	7	–	1	0	25	5th	25	14	11	0	.560	Won Quarterfinal series, 2–1 (Saskatchewan); Lost Semifinal series, 0–2 (Alberta)	
2022–23	Canada West	28	25	3	–	0	0	50	1st	35	29	6	0	.829	Won Semifinal series, 2–1 (Saskatchewan); Won Championship series, 2–1 (Alberta)	Lost Quarterfinal, 2–4 (Prince Edward Island)
2023–24	Canada West	28	21	5	–	1	1	44	2nd	35	24	10	1	.700	Won Semifinal series, 2–1 (Mount Royal); Lost Championship series, 1–2 (British Columbia)	Lost Quarterfinal, 1–2 (2OT) (Toronto Metropolitan)
Totals										GP	W	L	T/SOL	%	Championships	
Regular Season										1602	868	581	53	.596	1 WCIAA Championships, 12 Canada West Championships, 2 Mountain Division Titles	
Conference Post-season										196	99	97	0	.505	9 Canada West Championships	
U Sports Postseason										25	7	18	0	.280	14 National tournament appearances	
Regular Season and Postseason Record										1723	974	696	53	.581		

¿ Calgary forfeited 6 games during the season for use of ineligible player.
Note: Games not counted towards University Cup appearances are not included.

== See also ==
- Calgary Dinos women's ice hockey
