= 1999 CIAU University Cup =

Canadian hockey tournament

Tournament details
- Venue(s): Rutherford Arena, Saskatoon, Saskatchewan
- Dates: March 25–28
- Teams: 6

Final positions
- Champions: Alberta Golden Bears (9th title)
- Runners-up: Moncton Aigles Bleus

Tournament statistics
- Games played: 7

Awards
- MVP: Cam Danyluk (Alberta)

The 1999 CIS (Canadian Interuniversity Sport) Men's University Cup Hockey Tournament (37th annual) was held at the Credit Union Centre in Saskatoon, Saskatchewan. The Saskatchewan Huskies served as tournament host.

== Road to the Cup ==
=== AUS playoffs ===
Quarterfinals
1	St. Francis Xavier	2	6	—
4	Dalhousie	1	1	—
Kelly Division
2	Acadia	3	3	1
3	Saint Mary’s	2	6	0
1	St. Thomas	2	6	—
4	Prince Edward Island	1	5	—
MacAdam Division
2	New Brunswick	6	2	4
3	Moncton	2	4	5

Semifinals
1	St. Francis Xavier	5	5	3
2	Acadia	2	6	6
1	St. Thomas	5	1	—
3	Moncton	7	2	—

Championship
K2	Acadia	2	5	3
M3	Moncton	4	4	5

Note: * denotes overtime period(s)

=== OUA playoffs ===
Division Semifinals
FE2	Concordia	3	6	—
FE3	Ottawa	1	3	—
ME2	Queen's	1	4	3****
ME3	Toronto	2	0	2
MW2	Brock	2	7	7
MW3	Laurentian	8	4	2
FW2	Wilfrid Laurier	3	1	2
FW3	Waterloo	2	3	4

Division Finals
FE1	Quebec–Trois-Rivières	3	5	—
FE2	Concordia	1	1	—
East
ME1	Guelph	5	6	4
ME2	Queen's	0	7	2
MW1	York	2	6*	4
MW2	Brock	4	5	2
West
FW1	Windsor	6	4**	—
FW3	Waterloo	3	3	—

Queen's Cup Semifinals
FE1	Quebec–Trois-Rivières	3
ME1	Guelph	1
MW1	York	3
FW1	Windsor	1

Queen's Cup Final
FE1	Quebec–Trois-Rivières	7
MW1	York	0
Third Place Game
ME1	Guelph	1
FW1	Windsor	3

Note: * denotes overtime period(s)

=== Canada West playoffs ===
Division Semifinal
G2	Manitoba	5	2	—
G3	Brandon	2	1	—
M2	Calgary	7	2	6
M3	Lethbridge	6	6	2

Division Final
G1	Saskatchewan	4	10	—
G2	Manitoba	2	4	—
M1	Alberta	6	7	—
M2	Calgary	3	3	—

Championship
G1	Saskatchewan	5	4	—
M1	Alberta	2	1	—

Note: * denotes overtime period(s)

== University Cup ==
The rotating wild-card moved to OUA. Due to the conference already advancing two teams from the Ontario and Quebec regions, a third place game was instituted to determine the wild-card qualifier.

All teams were ranked by committee with a preference to avoiding intra-conference pool play.

Seed	Team	Qualification	Record	Appearance	Last
1	Quebec–Trois-Rivières Patriotes	Quebec: OUA Champion	24–5–1	9th	1998
2	Saskatchewan Huskies	West: Canada West Champion / Host	22–9–1	7th	1998
3	Moncton Aigles Bleus	Atlantic: AUS Champion	18–14–3	11th	1995
4	Alberta Golden Bears	Wild-card: Canada West Runner-up	23–5–5	24th	1998
5	Windsor Lancers	Wild-card: OUA Third place	20–7–3	2nd	1998
6	York Yeomen	Ontario: OUA Runner-up	11–12–7	8th	1997

=== Bracket ===
	Pool A	QTR	ALB	YOR	Overall
1	Quebec–Trois-Rivières		L 2–5	L 2–5	0–2
4	Alberta	W 5–2		W 4–0	2–0
6	York	W 5–2	L 0–4		1–1

	Pool B	SAS	MON	WIN	Overall
2	Saskatchewan		L 4–5	W 4–1	1–1
3	Moncton	W 5–4		W 4–3	2–0
5	Windsor	L 1–4	L 3–4		0–2

Championship; March 28
4	Alberta	6
3	Moncton	2

Note: * denotes overtime period(s)
Note: round-robin games were played on consecutive days March 25–27

== Championship final ==
March 28, 1999	#4 Alberta Golden Bears	6–2	#5 Moncton Aigles Bleus	Rutherford Arena, Saskatoon, Saskatchewan
