= 1993–94 Alabama–Huntsville Chargers men's ice hockey season =

American college ice hockey team season

1993–94 Alabama–Huntsville Chargers men's ice hockey

NCAA Division II Runners-up
- Conference: Independent
- Record: 20–5–1
- Head coach: Doug Ross (12th season)
- Home stadium: Von Braun Civic Center

The 1993–94 Alabama–Huntsville Chargers men's ice hockey team represented the University of Alabama in Huntsville in the 1993–94 NCAA Division II men's hockey season. The Chargers were led by Doug Ross, who was in his 12th season as head coach, and played their home games at the Von Braun Civic Center.

The Chargers finished the regular season with a 19–4–1 record, including a win over Division I Providence. As the top-ranked team in Division II, UAH hosted the Division II Championship Series against Bemidji State. UAH won the first game of the series 5–3, behind two goals from Junior Garry Symons. Bemidji State won game 2, 2–1, setting up a 20-minute "mini-game" tiebreaker. Tied at 1 after 20 minutes, Bemidji scored 15:48 into overtime to win the championship. The final was attended by 6,451 at the VBCC, a record for a Division II event.

== Roster ==
No.	Nat.	Player	Class	Pos	Height	Weight	DoB	Hometown	Previous team
		Brett Agan	Freshman	G				Burlington, Vermont	Smith Falls (CJHL)
20		Eric Bilyeu	Freshman	LW	5' 9" (1.75 m)	170 lb (77 kg)	1973-03-22	St. Joseph, Michigan
4		Steve Borko	Sophomore	D	6' 5" (1.96 m)	200 lb (91 kg)	1971-01-11	Schaumburg, Illinois	Des Moines (USHL)
		Darryl Bossence	Senior	D	5' 0" (1.52 m)	175 lb (79 kg)	1971-03-05	Chatham, Ontario
		Shane Bowler	Junior	C	5' 8" (1.73 m)	181 lb (82 kg)	1971-05-25	Toronto, Ontario	Vaughan (COJHL)
		Kevin Brady	Freshman	G	6' 4" (1.93 m)	195 lb (88 kg)	1972-10-08	Livonia, Michigan
		Kevin Caputo	Senior	D	6' 0" (1.83 m)	185 lb (84 kg)	1969-07-01	Trail, British Columbia	New Westminster (BCJHL)
7		Brad Dame	Sophomore	D	6' 0" (1.83 m)	190 lb (86 kg)	1972-01-31	Windsor, Ontario	Windsor (WOHL)
		Chad Dyjak	Freshman	D	6' 3" (1.91 m)	185 lb (84 kg)	1973-02-13	Aurora, Colorado	Waterloo (USHL)
		Graham Fair	Senior	C	6' 1" (1.85 m)	201 lb (91 kg)	1969-09-21	Campbell River, British Columbia	Cowichan Valley (BCJHL)
16		Tony Guzzo	Freshman	C	5' 10" (1.78 m)	175 lb (79 kg)		Canton, Michigan
		Mark Hernandez	Junior	F	5' 11" (1.8 m)	181 lb (82 kg)	1971-02-19	Livonia, Michigan	Omaha (USHL)
6		Marc Macera	Sophomore	D	5' 11" (1.8 m)	185 lb (84 kg)	1971-12-20	London, Ontario
18		Mario Mazzuca	Sophomore	LW	6' 0" (1.83 m)	210 lb (95 kg)	1971-11-13	Dearborn, Michigan
		Jim Popa	Sophomore	D	6' 2" (1.88 m)	205 lb (93 kg)	1972-08-27	Massillon, Ohio	SUNY Plattsburgh (NCAA D-III)
30		Derek Puppa	Sophomore	G	5' 9" (1.75 m)	170 lb (77 kg)	1972-02-18	Kirkland Lake, Ontario
		Brian Richard	Sophomore	LW	5' 11" (1.8 m)	216 lb (98 kg)	1971-02-04	Windsor, Ontario	Windsor (WOHL)
		Mike Scanlan	Sophomore	F	5' 8" (1.73 m)	165 lb (75 kg)	1972-06-20	Amherstburg, Ontario	Peterborough (COJHL)
21		K. C. Schneider	Freshman	RW	5' 11" (1.8 m)	180 lb (82 kg)		Indianapolis, Indiana
		Dave Slifka (C)	Senior	D	6' 2" (1.88 m)	220 lb (100 kg)	1971-08-13	Darien, Illinois
5		Taso Sofikitis	Sophomore	D	5' 10" (1.78 m)	195 lb (88 kg)	1971-03-01	Vancouver, British Columbia	Bellingham (BCJHL)
		Garry Symons	Junior	F	5' 11" (1.8 m)	174 lb (79 kg)	1971-02-24	Wheatley, Ontario
17		Wade Tulk	Sophomore	C	5' 10" (1.78 m)	180 lb (82 kg)	1971-09-23	St. Catharines, Ontario	Massena (CJHL)
		Kyle Wessells	Freshman	F				Rochester, New York
		Lance West	Junior	C	5' 10" (1.78 m)	185 lb (84 kg)	1970-09-20	Penticton, British Columbia	Kelowna (BCJHL)
8		Sheldon Wolitski	Sophomore	D	5' 11" (1.8 m)	188 lb (85 kg)	1972-07-12	St. Albert, Alberta
12		Ryan Wood	Sophomore	RW	5' 11" (1.8 m)	197 lb (89 kg)	1971-09-28	Morden, Manitoba	Winkler (MJHL)

== Schedule and results ==
- Green background indicates win.
- Red background indicates loss.
- Yellow background indicates tie.

Date	Opponent	Site	Decision	Result	Attendance	Record
Regular Season
October 16	at Windsor	Windsor, Ontario		W 6–2		1–0–0
October 17	at Windsor	Windsor, Ontario	Puppa	T 4–4 ^{OT}		1–0–1
October 29	Mercyhurst	Von Braun Civic Center • Huntsville, Alabama	Puppa	L 3–9	2,581	1–1–1
October 30	Mercyhurst	Von Braun Civic Center • Huntsville, Alabama		W 7–4	992	2–1–1
November 6	Windsor	Von Braun Civic Center • Huntsville, Alabama		W 5–2	778	3–1–1
November 7	Windsor	Von Braun Civic Center • Huntsville, Alabama		W 5–4	656	4–1–1
November 19	RIT	Von Braun Civic Center • Huntsville, Alabama		W 6–4	1,426	5–1–1
November 20	RIT	Von Braun Civic Center • Huntsville, Alabama		W 7–1	1,516	6–1–1
November 27	at Providence	Schneider Arena • Providence, Rhode Island		W 4–2		7–1–1
November 28	at American International	Springfield, Massachusetts		W 7–2		8–1–1
December 10	New Hampshire College	Von Braun Civic Center • Huntsville, Alabama		W 14–0	1,508	9–1–1
December 11	New Hampshire College	Von Braun Civic Center • Huntsville, Alabama		W 9–6	1,289	10–1–1
January 1	Merrimack	Von Braun Civic Center • Huntsville, Alabama		W 7–5	1,600	11–1–1
January 2	Merrimack	Von Braun Civic Center • Huntsville, Alabama	Puppa	L 0–5	1,086	11–2–1
January 8	Saint Anselm	Von Braun Civic Center • Huntsville, Alabama	Puppa	L 6–7 ^{OT}	2,744	11–3–1
January 9	Saint Anselm	Von Braun Civic Center • Huntsville, Alabama		W 7–1		12–3–1
January 16	Stonehill	Von Braun Civic Center • Huntsville, Alabama		W 18–1	1,798	13–3–1
January 17	Stonehill	Von Braun Civic Center • Huntsville, Alabama		W 17–5	1,041	14–3–1
January 21	at Mankato State	All Seasons Arena • Mankato, Minnesota		W 6–2		15–3–1
January 22	at Mankato State	All Seasons Arena • Mankato, Minnesota	Puppa	L 1–2		15–4–1
February 11	Quinnipiac	Von Braun Civic Center • Huntsville, Alabama		W 14–1	4,500	16–4–1
February 12	Quinnipiac	Von Braun Civic Center • Huntsville, Alabama		W 15–0	2,923	17–4–1
February 18	Mankato State	Von Braun Civic Center • Huntsville, Alabama		W 7–2	4,000	18–4–1
February 19	Mankato State	Von Braun Civic Center • Huntsville, Alabama		W 4–3	5,169	19–4–1
NCAA Championship Series
March 11	Bemidji State	Von Braun Civic Center • Huntsville, Alabama	Puppa	W 5–3	4,607	20–4–1
March 12	Bemidji State	Von Braun Civic Center • Huntsville, Alabama	Puppa	L 1–2	6,541	20–5–1
March 12	Bemidji State	Von Braun Civic Center • Huntsville, Alabama (Mini-Game)	Puppa	L 1–2 ^{OT}	6,541	20–5–1
*Non-conference game. Source:

== Statistics ==
=== Skaters ===
Player	Pos	Yr	GP	G	A	Pts	PIM	PPG	SHG	GWG
Graham Fair	C	Sr	26	23	39	62	8	8	1	3
Garry Symons	LW	Jr	24	25	20	45	108	7	2	4
Tony Guzzo	C	Fr	24	18	23	41	18	2	2	2
Lance West	LW	Jr	26	13	25	38	16	4	0	1
Brian Richard	LW	So	26	18	18	36	78	5	1	2
Mario Mazzuca	LW	So	25	16	17	33	56	4	0	0
Sheldon Wolitski	D	So	25	6	24	30	31	0	0	1
Shane Bowler	C	Jr	23	7	21	28	28	1	1	0
Mark Hernandez	RW	Jr	20	9	14	23	10	0	1	1
Dave Slifka	D	Sr	26	7	16	23	36	3	1	0
Wade Tulk	C	So	25	5	18	23	18	0	0	0
Ryan Wood	RW	So	26	9	13	22	14	5	0	3
Mike Scanlan	C	So	26	8	13	21	16	0	0	2
Darryl Bossence	F	Sr	26	7	9	16	48	0	0	1
Taso Sofikitis	D	So	22	1	9	10	48	0	0	0
Mark Macera	D	So	18	4	4	8	16	0	0	0
Brad Dame	D	So	25	2	4	6	20	0	0	0
Eric Bilyeu	C	Fr	8	4	1	5	0	0	1	0
Steve Borko	D	So	19	1	4	5	40	0	0	0
Jim Popa	D	Fr	7	1	2	3	6	0	0	0
Kyle Wessells	D	Jr	7	1	2	3	6	1	0	0
K. C. Schneider	RW	Fr	10	0	1	1	2	0	0	0
Chad Dyjak	D	Fr	3	0	1	1	2	0	0	0
Kevin Caputo	D	Sr	4	0	0	0	6	0	0	0
Brett Agan	G	Fr	5		0		0			
Derek Puppa	G	So	24		0		0			
Kevin Brady	G	So	2		0		0			
Team			26	185	298	483	631	40	10	20

=== Goaltenders ===
Player	Yr	GP	TOI	W	L	T	GA	GAA	SV	SV%	SO
Derek Puppa	So	24	1404	18	5	1	63	2.69	665	0.913	2
Brett Agan	Fr	5	132	1	0	0	12	5.45	42	0.778	0
Kevin Brady	So	2	60	1	0	0	6	6.00	19	0.760	0
