= WCIAA men's ice hockey tournament =

Western Canadian Intercollegiate Athletic Association men's ice hockey tournament
- Conference hockey championship
- Sport: Ice hockey
- Conference: Western Canadian Intercollegiate Athletic Association
- Format: Single-elimination
- Played: 1962–1972
- Winner trophy: Hardy Trophy

The Western Canadian Intercollegiate Athletic Association men's ice hockey tournament was an annual conference championship held between member teams.

== History ==
In 1962, the Canadian Intercollegiate Athletic Union announced that it would be holding the first national collegiate tournament in 1963. In response, the Western Canadian Intercollegiate Athletic Union (WCIAU), reformed as the Western Canadian Intercollegiate Athletic Association (WCIAA) and its champion would automatically receive a berth into the University Cup tournament. The move prompted Manitoba to return to the conference, bringing the number of members back up to four. In 1964, British Columbia was forced to withdraw due to high travel expenses, however, the addition of Calgary allowed the league to remain a foursome. Two years later, UBC returned and the league held its first postseason tournament thanks to a tie for first in the standings. Two more additions in 1969 brought the league up to eight members and the conference adopted a playoff tournament as a permanent fixture.

In 1972, the conference split in two. The Great Plains Athletic Association (GPAA) and Canada West Universities Athletic Association (CWUAA) were formed in part to reduce travel expenses.

== Tournaments ==
=== 1963 ===
Seed	School	Standings
1	British Columbia	8–1–1
2	Saskatchewan	7–4–1
3	Alberta	6–6–0
4	Manitoba	0–10–0

No playoff

=== 1964 ===
Seed	School	Standings
1	Alberta	7–5–0
T–2	British Columbia	6–6–0
T–2	Manitoba	6–6–0
4	Saskatchewan	5–7–0

Saskatchewan was forced to forfeit 4 games due to using ineligible players.
No playoff

=== 1965 ===
Seed	School	Standings
1	Manitoba	10–2–0
T–2	Alberta	7–5–0
T–2	Saskatchewan	7–5–0
4	Calgary	0–12–0

No playoff

=== 1966 ===
Seed	School	Standings
1	Alberta	11–1–0
2	Manitoba	8–4–0
3	Saskatchewan	5–7–0
4	Calgary	0–12–0

No playoff

=== 1967 ===
Seed	School	Standings
T–1	Saskatchewan	13–3–0
T–1	Alberta	12–3–0
3	Manitoba	8–8–0
4	British Columbia	6–9–0
5	Calgary	0–16–0

Alberta and British Columbia played two 3-point games between each other.

Championship; March 8
Saskatchewan	4
Alberta	3

=== 1968 ===
Seed	School	Standings
1	Alberta	11–5–0
T–2	Saskatchewan	10–6–0
T–2	Manitoba	10–6–0
4	British Columbia	7–9–0
5	Calgary	2–14–0

No playoff

=== 1969 ===
Seed	School	Standings	Seed	School	Standings
1	Alberta	16–4–0	T–4	British Columbia	10–10–0
2	Saskatchewan	13–7–0	T–4	Manitoba	10–10–0
3	Calgary	11–9–0	6	Winnipeg	0–20–0

No playoff

=== 1970 ===
Seed	School	Standings	Seed	School	Standings
1	Calgary	11–3–0	5	Brandon	7–7–0
2	Alberta	11–3–0	6	Saskatchewan	6–8–0
3	Manitoba	9–5–0	7	Winnipeg	4–10–0
4	British Columbia	8–6–0	8	Victoria	0–14–0

Calgary was awarded 1st place due to having a better goal differential.

Semifinals; February 20-21
1	Calgary	7	8	-
4	British Columbia	6	1	-
2	Alberta	10	7	-
3	Manitoba	4	5	-

Championship; February 27-28
1	Calgary	2	1	-
2	Alberta	3	3	-

Note: * denotes overtime period(s)

=== 1971 ===
Seed	School	Standings	Seed	School	Standings
1	Manitoba	16–4–0	5	Saskatchewan	10–10–0
2	British Columbia	15–5–0	6	Winnipeg	6–14–0
3	Calgary	13–7–0	7	Brandon	4–16–0 ^{†}
4	Alberta	12–8–0 ^{†}	8	Victoria	3–17–0

† Alberta and Brandon were both forced to forfeit 4 games for using ineligible players during the season.
In the match between the two teams, both squads were awarded a loss.

Semifinals; February 26-28
1	Manitoba	6	5	-
4	Alberta	4	4	-
2	British Columbia	9	3	7
3	Calgary	1	4	4

Championship; March 5-6
1	Manitoba	3	6	-
2	British Columbia	5	7	-

Note: * denotes overtime period(s)

=== 1972 ===
East			West		
Seed	School	Standings	Seed	School	Standings
1	Winnipeg	10–10–0	1	Alberta	18–2–0
T–2	Manitoba	8–12–0 ^{†}	2	Calgary	15–5–0
T–2	Brandon	8–12–0	3	British Columbia	14–6–0
4	Saskatchewan	7–13–0	4	Victoria	0–20–0 ^{†}

† Manitoba lost three games by forfeit. Victoria lost one game to Saskatchewan by forfeit.

Play-in; March 3-4
Manitoba	5	7	12
Brandon	4	5	9

Semifinals; March 10-11
W1	Alberta	6
E2	Manitoba	2
E1	Winnipeg	5
W2	Calgary	6

Championship; March 12
W1	Alberta	3
W2	Calgary	1

Note: * denotes overtime period(s)

== Championships ==
School	Championships
Alberta	6
British Columbia	2
Saskatchewan	1
Manitoba	1

== See also ==
- WCIAU men's ice hockey tournament
- GPAC men's ice hockey tournament
- Canada West men's ice hockey tournament
