= Windsor Lancers men's ice hockey =

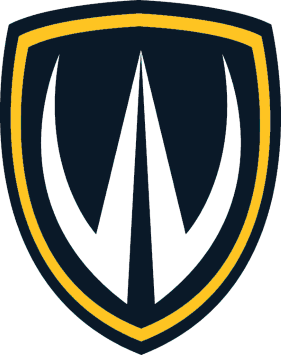
- University: University of Windsor
- Conference: OUA; OUA West Division
- Head coach: Tylin Hilbig; Since 2008–09 season
- Assistant coaches: Kyle Makaric; Andrew Donaldson; Andy Delmore; Andrew Corchis
- Arena: Adie Knox Arena; Windsor, Ontario
- Colors: Old and Navy

U Sports tournament appearances
- 1998, 2014, 2015, 2023

Conference tournament champions
- 1998, 2014

Conference regular season champions
- 1965, 1998, 2015

The Windsor Lancers men's ice hockey team is an active ice hockey program representing the Windsor Lancers athletic department of the University of Windsor. The team has been active since the early 1960s and is currently a member of the Ontario University Athletics conference under the authority of U Sports. The Lancers play at the Adie Knox Arena in Windsor.

== History ==
The Windsor Lancers men's hockey team began in the early 1960s as members of the Ontario Intercollegiate Athletics Association (as the Assumption College Lancers). The Lancers won their division in 1965, but lost the OIAA final to Laurentian University in a sudden-death 4–2 loss. In 1968, the Lancers were promoted to the QOAA. In 1971, the QOAA was dissolved and the Lancers joined the newly formed Ontario University Athletics Association, now known as the OUA.

The Windsor Lancers men's hockey team is currently led by Head Coach Kevin Hamlin. Coach Hamlin has led the Lancers to the 2013–14 OUA Queen's Cup Championship and two straight CIS national championship tournament appearances.

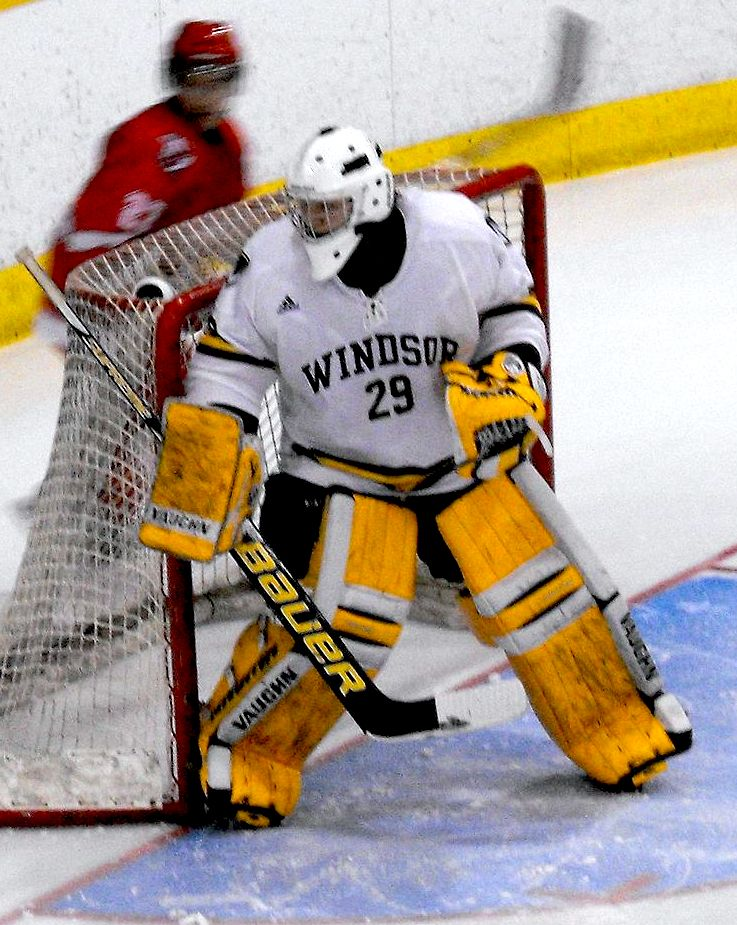
Lancers at Windsor Arena vs. York Lions in playoff game (February 16, 2012)

In 2008–09, Hamlin's first season, he was named the OUA Men's Hockey Coach of the Year after leading the Lancers to a 15-point turnaround in the standings from the previous year. In 2010–11, Hamlin's Lancers finished the regular season with a 12–12–4 record as he led Windsor back into the playoffs for the second straight season. His second year behind the Lancer bench came in 2009–10 where led the Lancers back to the playoffs as they advanced to the OUA West Semi-finals. In 2011–12, he led the Lancers to their best season in over a decade as they finished 15–12–1 and advanced the Western Conference finals. Coach Hamlin's squad finished the year ranked #11 in the country. In 2012–13, Coach Hamlin's squad finished 18–9–1 and in second place in the OUA Western conference. The Lancers finished as one of the top scoring teams in the nation including 8th in Canada in goals and 6th in the CIS in power-play goals.

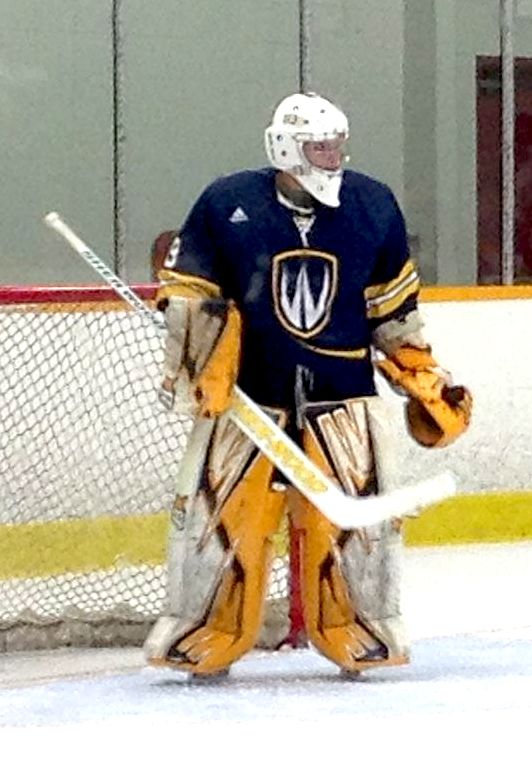
2013–14 home opener vs. Carleton Ravens

In 2013–14, Coach Hamlin led his squad to the Queen's Cup Ontario Championship for only the second time in school history. They also finished the season ranked #5 in Canada – the program's highest ever finish in the national rankings. Hamlin was honoured with both the Windsor Essex Sports (WESPY) Coach of the Year award and the Gino Fracas Coach of the Year award for his outstanding work behind the bench.

En route to winning the Queen's Cup, the Lancers enjoyed a tremendous playoff run that included playoff series wins over Toronto, Western, Lakehead and McGill to earn the title. At the CIS National Championship tournament, Windsor also earned their first ever victory at Nationals as they knocked off the A.U.S. champion Acadia Axemen 4–2 in pool play.

In 2014–15, Hamlin was named the Ontario University Men's Hockey Coach of the Year for the second time in his career and was a finalist for the CIS National Coach of the Year after leading the Lancers to a program best 22–4–1 record and first place overall in the OUA. The Lancers were ranked in the CIS top ten for 17 straight weeks and captured an Ontario bronze medal while earning their second consecutive trip to the CIS national championships. Individually, the team received tremendous recognition for their outstanding season. Senior forward Spencer Pommells, a native of Grande Prairie, Alta., became the first Lancer to claim the Joseph A. Sullivan Trophy as CIS player of the year and only the third Windsor player to capture a CIS major award in men's hockey. Forwards Chris Gignac (1999) and Ken Minello (1989) had previously merited the R.W. Pugh Award presented annually to the most sportsmanlike player. The senior forward racked up 50 points in 27 league games, including 16 goals and a CIS-leading 34 assists, to win the national scoring race by eight points and the OUA crown by 11. Of his team-leading 16 goals, five were game-winners, leaving him one short of the nation's lead. Kenny Bradford was named the OUA Defenseman of the year and a CIS All-Canadian after he led the CIS in scoring by a defenceman with 28 points, scoring eight goals and adding 20 assists. He was a key cog in the Lancers third-ranked power play, scoring six of his eight goals on the man advantage. Senior netminder Parker Van Buskirk was named the OUA goaltender of the year after he led the conference with 20 wins and made the second most starts of any goaltender with 24. His 2.86 goals against average was the second-best of any western conference goalie, and his .904 save percentage was sixth best overall. Dylan Denomme was named the OUA West rookie of the year as he finished second on the Lancers in points with 31, scoring 13 goals and 18 assists, while appearing in all 27 games. He led all CIS rookies in scoring and tied Bradford for the team lead with six power play goals as well.

In recent years the Lancer's have continued their winning ways. Led by USports goaltender of the year, Nathan Torchia, the 2022-23 Lancers had an incredible season. Finishing 2nd in the OUA west after the regular season. They earned a first round bye which led to them playing the Brock Badgers in the second round. They won this series in 2 games which meant they were onto the OUA West conference finals. Were they met the Lakehead Thunderwolves and this series was very tight and a 3rd and deciding game was needed. The Lancers ultimately won this game which punched their ticket to USports Men's Hockey National Championship's held in PEI and gave them rights to hosting the Queens Cup in Windsor. The Queens Cup was a hard fought game and needed 6 total periods to decide a winner. Unfortunately the Lancer's surrendered a goal early on in the 3rd overtime to the UQTR Patriot's. After a 2nd place finish in the OUA playoffs, this still meant the Lancer's were heading to PEI for the Usports Championships. Where they met the Alberta Golden Bears in the first round, winner takes all game. Unfortunately the game didn't go as planned and the Golden Bears came out to a scorching hot start scoring multiple goals early on. The Lancers were unable to battle back and lost. Overall it was an incredible season for them, going on such a terrific run and falling a goal post short of being Queens Cup champions.

== Season-by-season results ==
Note: GP = Games played, W = Wins, L = Losses, T = Ties, OTL = Overtime Losses, SOL = Shootout Losses, Pts = Points

U Sports Champion	U Sports Semifinalist	Conference regular season champions	Conference Division Champions	Conference Playoff Champions

Season	Conference	Regular Season													Conference Tournament Results	National Tournament Results
Season	Conference	Conference								Overall					Conference Tournament Results	National Tournament Results
Season	Conference	GP	W	L	T	OTL	SOL	Pts*	Finish	GP	W	L	T	%	Conference Tournament Results	National Tournament Results
1964–65	OIAA	6	6	0	0	–	–	12	T–1st	7	6	1	0	.857	Lost Final, 2–4 (Laurentian)	
1965–66	OIAA	10	1	9	0	–	–	2	6th	10	1	9	0	.813		
1966–67	OIAA	12	7	5	0	–	–	14	3rd	12	7	5	0	.583		
1967–68	OIAA	12	6	6	0	–	–	12	4th	12	6	6	0	.500		
1968–69	QOAA	15	5	8	2	–	–	12	7th	15	5	8	2	.400		
1969–70	QOAA	15	4	9	2	–	–	10	10th	15	4	9	2	.333		
1970–71	QOAA	15	3	9	3	–	–	9	T–10th	15	3	9	3	.300		
1971–72	OUAA	19	8	8	3	–	–	19	8th	20	8	9	3	.475	Lost Quarterfinal, 2–5 (Western Ontario)	
1972–73	OUAA	17	9	8	0	–	–	18	8th	18	9	9	0	.500	Lost Quarterfinal, 1–7 (Western Ontario)	
1973–74	OUAA	18	2	14	2	–	–	6	14th	18	2	14	2	.167		
1974–75	OUAA	17	1	15	1	–	–	3	14th	17	1	15	1	.088		
1975–76	OUAA	20	3	14	3	–	–	9	13th	20	3	14	3	.225		
1976–77	OUAA	18	5	12	1	–	–	11	12th	18	5	12	1	.306		
1977–78	OUAA	20	6	9	5	–	–	17	10th	21	6	10	5	.405	Lost Quarterfinal, 4–9 (Western Ontario)	
1978–79	OUAA	16	8	7	1	–	–	17	7th	17	8	8	1	.500	Lost Quarterfinal, ? (Guelph)	
1979–80	OUAA	22	1	20	1	–	–	3	T–11th	22	1	20	1	.068		
1980–81	OUAA	22	8	13	1	–	–	17	8th	22	8	13	1	.386		
1981–82	OUAA	22	7	13	2	–	–	16	T–9th	22	7	13	2	.364		
1982–83	OUAA	24	11	12	1	–	–	23	T–8th	24	11	12	1	.479		
1983–84	OUAA	24	8	15	1	–	–	17	10th	24	8	15	1	.354		
1984–85	OUAA	24	12	8	4	–	–	28	7th	24	12	8	4	.583		
1985–86	OUAA	24	13	6	5	–	–	31	5th	25	13	7	5	.620	Lost Quarterfinal, 3–4 (Western Ontario); Lost Semifinal series, 0–2 (Wilfrid Laurier)	
1986–87	OUAA	24	9	9	6	–	–	.500	6th	29	12	11	6	.517	Won Quarterfinal series, 2–0 (Toronto); Lost Semifinal series, 1–2 (York)	
1987–88	OUAA	26	16	7	3	–	–	35	4th	32	20	9	3	.672	Won Division Semifinal series, 2–0 (Ryerson); Won Division Final series, 2–1 (Brock); Lost Semifinal, 2–5 (York)	
1988–89	OUAA	26	14	11	1	–	–	29	T–8th	29	15	13	1	.534	Lost Division Semifinal series, 1–2 (Ryerson)	
1989–90	OUAA	22	12	9	1	–	–	25	7th	24	12	11	1	.521	Lost Division Semifinal series, 0–2 (Waterloo)	
1990–91	OUAA	22	13	8	1	–	–	27	T–6th	24	13	10	1	.563	Lost Quarterfinal series, 0–2 (Wilfrid Laurier)	
1991–92	OUAA	22	12	10	0	–	–	24	9th	22	12	10	0	.545		
1992–93	OUAA	22	9	12	1	–	–	19	T–10th	22	9	12	1	.432		
1993–94	OUAA	24	8	14	2	–	–	18	11th	24	8	14	2	.375		
1994–95	OUAA	24	8	11	5	–	–	21	12th	24	8	11	5	.438		
1995–96	OUAA	26	14	11	1	–	–	29	9th	29	15	13	1	.534	Won Division Semifinal, 5–4 (2OT) (Western Ontario); Lost Division Final series, 0–2 (Waterloo)	
1996–97	OUAA	26	15	8	3	–	–	33	4th	27	15	9	3	.611	Lost Division Semifinal, 2–6 (Western Ontario)	
1997–98	OUA	26	22	3	1	–	–	45	1st	33	27	5	1	.833	Won Division Final series, 3–0 (Waterloo); Won Semifinal, 6–2 (York); Won Championship, 2–1 (Quebec–Trois-Rivières)	Lost Pool A Round-Robin, 2–3 (New Brunswick), 3–6 (Alberta)
1998–99	OUA	26	17	6	3	–	–	37	2nd	31	19	9	3	.661	Won Division Final series, 2–0 (Waterloo); Lost Semifinal, 1–3 (York)	Lost Pool A Round-Robin, 1–4 (Saskatchewan), 3–4 (Moncton)
1999–00	OUA	26	11	9	6	–	–	28	6th	28	11	11	6	.500	Lost Division Semifinal series, 0–2 (Wilfrid Laurier)	
2000–01	OUA	24	8	14	2	–	–	18	10th	24	8	14	2	.375		
2001–02	OUA	24	8	15	1	–	–	17	T–12th	26	8	17	1	.327	Lost Division Semifinal series, 0–2 (Lakehead)	
2002–03	OUA	24	8	15	1	–	–	17	10th	26	8	17	1	.327	Lost Division Semifinal series, 0–2 (Lakehead)	
2003–04	OUA	24	7	17	0	0	–	14	14th	24	7	17	0	.292		
2004–05	OUA	24	7	10	4	3	–	21	T–12th	24	7	13	4	.375		
2005–06	OUA	24	7	12	3	2	–	19	T–11th	24	7	14	3	.354		
2006–07	OUA	28	10	17	0	1	–	21	T–12th	28	10	18	0	.357		
2007–08	OUA	28	6	21	–	0	1	13	18th	28	6	21	1	.232		
2008–09	OUA	28	13	13	–	0	2	28	13th	28	13	13	2	.500		
2009–10	OUA	28	10	13	–	3	2	25	T–13th	33	12	19	2	.394	Won Division Quarterfinal series, 2–1 (Waterloo); Lost Division Semifinal series, 0–2 (Western Ontario)	
2010–11	OUA	28	12	12	–	2	2	28	T–12th	28	12	14	2	.464	Lost Division Quarterfinal series, 0–2 (Western Ontario)	
2011–12	OUA	28	15	12	–	0	1	31	10th	35	19	15	1	.557	Won Division Quarterfinal series, 2–0 (York); Won Division Semifinal series, 2–1 (Lakehead); Lost Division Final series, 1–2 (Western Ontario); Lost Bronze Medal Game, 3–5 (Quebec–Trois-Rivières)	
2012–13	OUA	28	18	9	–	0	1	39	4th	34	22	11	1	.662	Won Division Quarterfinal series, 2–0 (York); Won Division Semifinal series, 2–0 (Guelph); Lost Division Final series, 0–2 (Waterloo)	
2013–14	OUA	28	17	11	–	0	0	34	T–8th	38	25	13	0	.658	Won Division Quarterfinal series, 2–0 (Toronto); Won Division Semifinal series, 2–1 (Western Ontario); Won Division Final series, 2–0 (Lakehead); Won Championship, 3–2 (McGill)	Lost Pool A Round-Robin, 4–2 (Acadia), 0–9 (Saskatchewan)
2014–15	OUA	27	22	4	–	1	0	39	1st	36	27	9	0	.750	Won Division Quarterfinal series, 2–1 (Brock); Won Division Semifinal series, 2–0 (Lakehead); Lost Division Final series, 0–2 (Guelph); Won Bronze Medal Game, 2–1 (OT) (McGill)	Lost Quarterfinal, 2–6 (New Brunswick)
2015–16	OUA	28	14	11	–	1	2	31	10th	31	15	14	2	.516	Lost Division Quarterfinal series, 1–2 (Guelph)	
2016–17	OUA	28	13	13	–	1	1	28	13th	37	18	18	1	.500	Won Division Quarterfinal series, 2–1 (Wilfrid Laurier); Won Division Semifinal series, 2–0 (Ryerson); Lost Division Final series, 1–2 (York); Lost Bronze Medal Game, 3–6 (McGill)	
2017–18	OUA	28	10	11	–	4	3	27	T–13th	31	11	17	3	.403	Lost Division Quarterfinal series, 1–2 (Guelph)	
2018–19	OUA	28	13	14	–	1	0	27	T–12th	30	13	17	0	.433	Lost Division Quarterfinal series, 0–2 (Guelph)	
2019–20	OUA	28	15	10	–	0	3	33	8th	30	15	12	3	.550	Lost Division Quarterfinal series, 0–2 (Brock)	
2020–21	Season cancelled due to COVID-19 pandemic															
2021–22	OUA	16	12	3	–	1	0	.781	2nd	17	12	5	0	.706	Lost First Round, 2–4 (York)	
2022–23	OUA	27	18	6	–	3	0	39	T–3rd	33	22	11	0	.667	Won Division Semifinal series, 2–0 (Brock); Won Division Final series, 2–1 (Lakehead); Lost Championship, 2–3 (3OT) (Quebec–Trois-Rivières)	Lost Quarterfinal, 0–7 (Alberta)
2023–24	OUA	28	15	11	–	1	1	32	T–9th	32	17	14	1	.547	Won Division Quarterfinal series, 2–0 (Lakehead); Lost Division Semifinal series, 0–2 (Brock)	
Totals										GP	W	L	T/SOL	%	Championships	
Regular Season										1340	592	646	102	.480	3 West Division Title, 3 Far West Division Titles, 1 OIAA Championships, 2 OUA Championships	
Conference Post-season										105	51	54	0	.486	2 OUA Championships	
U Sports Postseason										8	1	7	0	.125	5 National Tournament appearances	
Regular Season and Postseason Record										1453	644	707	102	.478		

Note: Results prior to 1964 are unavailable.
