= Winnipeg Wesmen men's ice hockey =

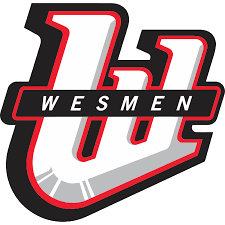
- University: University of Winnipeg
- First season: 1967 (dissolved in 1984)
- Arena: Winnipeg, Manitoba
- Colors: Red, White, and Black

The Winnipeg Wesmen men's ice hockey team was an ice hockey team representing the University of Winnipeg. The team was active from 1967 until 1984 and played out of the Pioneer Arena, now known as the Charlie Gardiner Arena.

== History ==
Wesley College, a small school in Winnipeg, was one of the first colleges in Western Canada to field a varsity ice hockey team, possibly as far back as the 1890s. The team was active when the school was amalgamated into United College in 1938, which then assumed control of the team. United's tenure with varsity hockey lasted just one season before the program was closed due to the outbreak of World War II. After the war, the school decided not to bring the team back. In 1967, United College became the University of Winnipeg and resurrected the ice hockey team.

The inaugural season for the Winnipeg Wesmen did not see much success. Under direction of Bill Johnson, the won just once in twenty games. Though they fired Johnson after the season, the team was able to earn admittance into the Western Canadian Intercollegiate Athletic Association (WCIAA), the top collegiate circuit in Western Canada. Their inaugural season in the league went even worse when the Wesmen went winless in 20 games under former NHLer Bill Juzda. Winnipeg turned to Tommy Marshall as the third head coach in as many seasons. Modest improvements with the team allowed Marshall to stick around and he remained with the club for the rest of its existence. In his third season behind the bench, Marshall led the team to a division title and its first postseason appearance.

In 1972, the WCIAA was plait in two primarily as a way of cutting down on travel expenses. Winnipeg were founding members of the Great Plains Athletic Association (soon to be called Great Plains Athletic Conference) and finished as runners-up in the first two seasons of play. Unfortunately, that was the high water mark for the program. While there was some criticism of Marshall's ability as coach, the team was hamstrung by its subpar (for the college level) rink and its lack of recruiting. After 1974, the team never finished higher than 4th in the standings and was often dead-last. With little hope for the foreseeable future, the university decided to suspend the program in 1984 and, as of 2024, it has yet to return.

== Season-by-season results ==
=== Senior and collegiate play ===
Note: GP = Games played, W = Wins, L = Losses, T = Ties, Pts = Points

Extra-League Champion	National Semifinalist	Conference regular season champions	Conference Division Champions	Conference Playoff Champions

Season	Conference	Regular Season											Conference Tournament Results	National Tournament Results
Season	Conference	Conference						Overall					Conference Tournament Results	National Tournament Results
Season	Conference	GP	W	L	T	Pts*	Finish	GP	W	L	T	%	Conference Tournament Results	National Tournament Results
Bill Johnson (1967–1968)
1967–68	Independent	–	–	–	–	–	–	20	1	19	0	.050		
Totals								GP	W	L	T	%	Championships	
Regular Season								20	1	19	0	.050		
Conference Post-season								–	–	–	–	–		
Regular Season and Postseason Record								–	–	–	–	–		

Note: information prior to 1949 are incomplete or missing.

=== Collegiate only ===
Note: GP = Games played, W = Wins, L = Losses, T = Ties, OTL = Overtime Losses, SOL = Shootout Losses, Pts = Points

U Sports Champion	U Sports Semifinalist	Conference regular season champions	Conference Division Champions	Conference Playoff Champions

Season	Conference	Regular Season													Conference Tournament Results	National Tournament Results
Season	Conference	Conference								Overall					Conference Tournament Results	National Tournament Results
Season	Conference	GP	W	L	T	OTL	SOL	Pts*	Finish	GP	W	L	T	%	Conference Tournament Results	National Tournament Results
Bill Juzda (1968–1969)
1968–69	WCIAA	20	0	20	0	–	–	14	6th	20	0	20	0	.000		
Tommy Marshall (1969–1984)
1969–70	WCIAA	14	4	10	0	–	–	8	7th	14	4	10	0	.286		
1970–71	WCIAA	20	6	14	0	–	–	12	6th	20	6	14	0	.300		
1971–72	WCIAA	20	10	10	0	–	–	20	4th	21	10	11	0	.476	Lost Semifinal, 5–6 (Calgary)	
1972–73	GPAA	12	8	4	0	–	–	16	2nd	12	8	4	0	.667		
1973–74	GPAC	18	10	8	0	–	–	20	2nd	18	10	8	0	.556		
1974–75	GPAC	21	3	18	0	–	–	6	4th	21	3	18	0	.143		
1975–76	GPAC	18	7	11	0	–	–	14	4th	18	7	11	0	.389		
1976–77	GPAC	22	9	12	1	–	–	19	T–3rd	22	9	12	1	.432		
1977–78	GPAC	24	8	15	1	–	–	17	4th	24	8	15	1	.354		
1978–79	GPAC	24	6	18	0	–	–	12	5th	24	6	18	0	.250		
1979–80	GPAC	20	1	19	0	–	–	2	5th	20	1	19	0	.050		
1980–81	GPAC	24	6	18	0	–	–	12	4th	24	6	18	0	.250		
1981–82	GPAC	24	3	21	0	–	–	6	5th	24	3	21	0	.125		
1982–83	GPAC	24	3	19	2	–	–	8	5th	24	3	19	2	.167		
1983–84	GPAC	24	3	21	0	–	–	6	5th	24	3	21	0	.125		
Program Suspended
Totals										GP	W	L	T/SOL	%	Championships	
Regular Season										329	87	238	4	.271	1 East Division Title	
Conference Post-season										1	0	1	0	.000		
U Sports Postseason										0	0	0	0	–		
Regular Season and Postseason Record										330	87	239	4	.270		

Totals include only games at senior collegiate level.
Note: Games not counted towards University Cup appearances are not included.
