= 1998 CIAU University Cup =

Canadian hockey tournament

Tournament details
- Venue(s): Rutherford Arena, Saskatoon, Saskatchewan
- Dates: March 26–29
- Teams: 6

Final positions
- Champions: New Brunswick Varsity Reds (1st title)
- Runners-up: Acadia Axemen

Tournament statistics
- Games played: 7

Awards
- MVP: Chris Zanutto (New Brunswick)

The 1998 CIAU Men's University Cup Hockey Tournament (36th annual) was held at the Rutherford Arena in Saskatoon, Saskatchewan. The Saskatchewan Huskies served as tournament host.

== Road to the Cup ==
=== AUAA playoffs ===
Quarterfinals
1	St. Francis Xavier	2	7	4
4	Saint Mary’s	3	5	2
Kelly Division
2	Acadia	4	2	—
3	Dalhousie	2	1	—
1	New Brunswick	9	2	5
4	Prince Edward Island	4	4	4
MacAdam Division
2	St. Thomas	7	7	—
3	Moncton	4	3	—

Semifinals
1	St. Francis Xavier	1	2	—
2	Acadia	3	9	—
1	New Brunswick	4	5	—
2	St. Thomas	2	4	—

Championship
K2	Acadia	2	2	2
M1	New Brunswick	1	3	3

Note: * denotes overtime period(s)

=== OUA playoffs ===
Division Semifinals
FE2	Concordia	3*	0	2
FE3	McGill	2	3	0
ME2	Toronto	2	2	—
ME3	Queen's	1	0	—
MW2	Brock	4	1	1
MW3	Laurentian	2	4	0
FW2	Waterloo	3	1	3**
FW3	Western Ontario	2	2*	2

Division Finals
FE1	Quebec–Trois-Rivières	6	5	3	—	—
FE2	Concordia	2	1	0	—	—
East
ME1	Guelph	5	6	6*	—	—
ME2	Toronto	3	2	5	—	—
MW1	York	5	5	5	—	—
MW2	Brock	4	2	4	—	—
West
FW1	Windsor	4	4	5	—	—
FW2	Waterloo	1	2	0	—	—

Queen's Cup Semifinals
FE1	Quebec–Trois-Rivières	?
ME1	Guelph	?
MW1	York	2
FW1	Windsor	6

Queen's Cup Final
FE1	Quebec–Trois-Rivières	1
FW1	Windsor	2

Note: * denotes overtime period(s)

=== Canada West playoffs ===
Division Semifinal
G2	Manitoba	6	5	—
G3	Brandon	3	2	—
M2	Calgary	1	3**	9
M3	British Columbia	4	2	3

Division Final
G1	Saskatchewan	2	8	5
G2	Manitoba	6	4	2
M1	Alberta	5	8	—
M2	Calgary	2	3	—

Championship
G1	Saskatchewan	5	2	4
M1	Alberta	4	3**	2

Note: * denotes overtime period(s)

== University Cup ==
The tournament field was expanded to six teams. In addition to the four regional qualifiers, one spot for the host team and one for a wild-card were brought back. With six teams now qualifying for the postseason, the tournament was reverted to a round-robin format. The wild-card was offered on a rotation basis to the runner up for one conference, beginning with AUAA. If the host team was also a conference champion, that conference would receive a second wild-card bid.

For the first time, all teams were ranked by committee with a preference to avoid intra-conference matches in pool play. The championship game remained a single elimination.

Seed	Team	Qualification	Record	Appearance	Last
1	Saskatchewan Huskies	West: Canada West Champion / Host	23–6–5	6th	1987
2	New Brunswick Varsity Reds	Atlantic: AUAA Champion	30–5–1	5th	1997
3	Windsor Lancers	Ontario: OUA Champion	27–3–1	1st	Never
4	Quebec–Trois-Rivières Patriotes	Quebec: OUA Runner-up	24–5–2	8th	1996
5	Alberta Golden Bears	Wild-card: Canada West Runner-up	23–5–5	23rd	1997
6	Acadia Axemen	Wild-card: AUAA Runner-up	22–11–1	5th	1996

=== Bracket ===
	Pool B	SAS	QTR	ACA	Overall
1	Saskatchewan		L 3–5	L 5–6	0–2
4	Quebec–Trois-Rivières	W 5–3		L 4–7	1–1
6	Acadia	W 6–5	W 7–4		2–0

	Pool A	UNB	WIN	ALB	Overall
2	New Brunswick		W 3–2	W 5–2	2–0
3	Windsor	L 2–3		L 3–6	0–2
5	Alberta	L 2–5	W 6–3		1–1

Championship; March 29
2	New Brunswick	6
6	Acadia	3

Note: * denotes overtime period(s)
Note: round-robin games were played on consecutive days March 26–28

== Championship final ==
March 29, 1998	#2 New Brunswick Varsity Reds	6–3	#6 Acadia Axemen	Rutherford Arena, Saskatoon, Saskatchewan
