= 2007–08 Alabama–Huntsville Chargers men's ice hockey season =

American college ice hockey team season

2007–08 Alabama–Huntsville Chargers men's ice hockey
- Conference: College Hockey America
- Record: 6–21–4 (3–13–4 CHA)
- Head coach: Danton Cole (1st season)
- Home stadium: Von Braun Center

The 2007–08 Alabama–Huntsville Chargers ice hockey team represented the University of Alabama in Huntsville in the 2007–08 NCAA Division I men's ice hockey season. The Chargers were coached by Danton Cole who was in his first season as head coach. The Chargers played their home games in the Von Braun Center and were members of the College Hockey America conference.

== Roster ==
No.	Nat.	Player	Class	Pos	Height	Weight	DoB	Hometown	Previous team
1		Wyatt Russell	Freshman	G	6' 1" (1.85 m)	180 lb (82 kg)	1986-07-10	Los Angeles, California	Brampton (OJHL)
2		Ryan Burkholder	Freshman	D	6' 1" (1.85 m)	195 lb (88 kg)	1987-09-01	Newmarket, Ontario	Newmarket (OJHL)
4		Brandon Roshko	Sophomore	D	5' 9" (1.75 m)	180 lb (82 kg)	1985-08-22	Hamilton, Ontario	Aurora (OJHL)
5		Brennan Barker	Sophomore	D	6' 1" (1.85 m)	195 lb (88 kg)	1985-07-19	Long Sault, Ontario	Penticton (BCHL)
6		Mike Ward	Freshman	D	5' 11" (1.8 m)	200 lb (91 kg)	1987-03-04	Strathroy, Ontario	Aurora (OJHL)
9		Tyler Hilbert	Senior	LW	5' 9" (1.75 m)	185 lb (84 kg)	1984-01-12	Okotoks, Alberta	Olds (AJHL)
10		Andrew Coburn	Freshman	F	5' 10" (1.78 m)	185 lb (84 kg)	1986-02-15	Mount Forest, Ontario	Vernon (BCHL)
11		Neil Ruffini	Freshman	F	5' 10" (1.78 m)	195 lb (88 kg)	1988-03-14	Roswell, Georgia	Proctor Academy (USHS–NH)
12		Josh Murray	Junior	RW	5' 11" (1.8 m)	190 lb (86 kg)	1984-11-11	Terrace, British Columbia	Williams Lake (BCHL)
13		Joey Koudys	Freshman	F	5' 11" (1.8 m)	185 lb (84 kg)	1988-03-28	Grimsby, Ontario	Thorold (GOJHL)
14		Cale Tanaka	Sophomore	LW	5' 9" (1.75 m)	180 lb (82 kg)	1986-05-31	Stouffville, Ontario	Aurora (OJHL)
15		Matt Baxter	Freshman	D	6' 3" (1.91 m)	180 lb (82 kg)	1988-08-04	Courtice, Ontario	Bowmanville (OJHL)
16		Tom Train	Sophomore	C	6' 1" (1.85 m)	190 lb (86 kg)	1985-02-22	Hurst, Texas	Texas (NAHL)
18		Scott Kalinchuk	Junior	D	6' 1" (1.85 m)	195 lb (88 kg)	1984-11-23	Sylvan Lake, Alberta	Canmore (AJHL)
19		Chris Fairbanks	Freshman	F	6' 1" (1.85 m)	180 lb (82 kg)	1986-07-15	Milford, Michigan	Youngstown (NAHL)
20		Joe Federoff	Junior	C	6' 2" (1.88 m)	205 lb (93 kg)	1984-08-05	Pittsburgh, Pennsylvania	Robert Morris (NCAA)
21		Derek Conter	Senior	F	6' 2" (1.88 m)	210 lb (95 kg)	1983-06-10	Toronto, Ontario	Wichita Falls (NAHL)
22		Kyle Goodchild	Freshman	F	6' 2" (1.88 m)	185 lb (84 kg)	1988-10-13	Courtice, Ontario	Bowmanville (OJHL)
23		Brady Cook	Freshman	F	6' 1" (1.85 m)	195 lb (88 kg)	1986-08-21	Sherwood Park, Alberta	Camrose (AJHL)
24		Matt Montes	Senior	D	6' 1" (1.85 m)	195 lb (88 kg)	1983-07-01	Forest Park, Illinois	Springfield (NAHL)
25		Kevin Morrison	Sophomore	LW	6' 1" (1.85 m)	190 lb (86 kg)	1986-04-30	Mississauga, Ontario	Milton (OJHL)
26		Kevin Galerno	Junior	LW	5' 7" (1.7 m)	160 lb (73 kg)	1984-01-19	Kitchener, Ontario	Kitchener (GOJHL)
27		Vince Bruni	Freshman	F	6' 1" (1.85 m)	190 lb (86 kg)	1987-04-08	Toronto, Ontario	Springfield (NAHL)
28		Davide Nicoletti	Sophomore	D	6' 3" (1.91 m)	210 lb (95 kg)	1986-03-22	Toronto, Ontario	Springfield (NAHL)
29		Blake MacNicol	Sophomore	G	5' 10" (1.78 m)	175 lb (79 kg)	1986-12-31	Milan, Ohio	Bay State (EJHL)
33		Cameron Talbot	Freshman	G	6' 3" (1.91 m)	185 lb (84 kg)	1987-06-05	Caledonia, Ontario	Hamilton (OJHL)
55		Matt Sweazey	Junior	C	6' 1" (1.85 m)	195 lb (88 kg)	1984-04-11	Toronto, Ontario	Georgetown (OJHL)

== Regular season ==
=== Schedule ===
Date	Time	Opponent	Site	Decision	Result	Attendance	Record
October 19	4:05 pm	vs. Canisius*	CenturyLink Center Omaha • Omaha, Nebraska (Maverick Stampede)	MacNicol	W 4–3	5,889	1–0–0 (0–0–0)
October 20	7:05 pm	at Nebraska–Omaha*	CenturyLink Center Omaha • Omaha, Nebraska (Maverick Stampede)	Talbot	L 1–5	5,541	1–1–0 (0–0–0)
October 26	6:00 pm	at UMass Lowell*	Tsongas Center • Lowell, Massachusetts	MacNicol	L 1–4	3,245	1–2–0 (0–0–0)
October 27	6:00 pm	at UMass Lowell*	Tsongas Center • Lowell, Massachusetts	Talbot	L 1–3	1,936	1–3–0 (0–0–0)
November 2	7:05 pm	Minnesota State*	Von Braun Center • Huntsville, Alabama	Talbot	L 0–7	2,426	1–4–0 (0–0–0)
November 3	7:05 pm	Minnesota State*	Von Braun Center • Huntsville, Alabama	MacNicol	L 2–4	1,507	1–5–0 (0–0–0)
November 9	5:35 pm	Bemidji State	Von Braun Center • Huntsville, Alabama	MacNicol	L 0–2	3,167	1–6–0 (0–1–0)
November 10	4:05 pm	Bemidji State	Von Braun Center • Huntsville, Alabama	MacNicol	T 3–3 ^{OT}	1,487	1–6–1 (0–1–1)
November 23	3:00 pm	vs. #9 Notre Dame*	Houston Field House • Troy, New York (RPI Holiday Tournament)	Talbot	L 1–4	2,626	1–7–1 (0–1–1)
November 24	3:00 pm	vs. American International*	Houston Field House • Troy, New York (RPI Holiday Tournament)	Talbot	W 5–3	2,957	2–7–1 (0–1–1)
December 7	7:35 pm	at Bemidji State	John S. Glas Field House • Bemidji, Minnesota	Talbot	L 1–4	1,219	2–8–1 (0–2–1)
December 8	7:05 pm	at Bemidji State	John S. Glas Field House • Bemidji, Minnesota	MacNicol	L 0–2	1,284	2–9–1 (0–3–1)
December 17	7:05 pm	Robert Morris	Von Braun Center • Huntsville, Alabama	Talbot	L 1–7	1,714	2–10–1 (0–4–1)
December 18	7:05 pm	Robert Morris	Von Braun Center • Huntsville, Alabama	MacNicol	T 4–4 ^{OT}	1,635	2–10–2 (0–4–2)
January 11	5:35 pm	Bemidji State	Von Braun Center • Huntsville, Alabama	MacNicol	L 0–4	2,152	2–11–2 (0–5–2)
January 12	4:05 pm	Bemidji State	Von Braun Center • Huntsville, Alabama	Talbot	L 1–7	2,633	2–12–2 (0–6–2)
January 18	7:05 pm	Yale*	Von Braun Center • Huntsville, Alabama	MacNicol	L 2–3	2,773	2–13–2 (0–6–2)
January 19	7:05 pm	Yale*	Von Braun Center • Huntsville, Alabama	MacNicol	W 3–2	2,705	3–13–2 (0–6–2)
January 25	6:05 pm	at Wayne State	Michigan State Fairgrounds Coliseum • Detroit, Michigan	MacNicol	L 0–2	332	3–14–2 (0–7–2)
January 26	6:05 pm	at Wayne State	Michigan State Fairgrounds Coliseum • Detroit, Michigan	Talbot	L 3–4 ^{OT}	366	3–15–2 (0–8–2)
February 1	6:35 pm	at Robert Morris	Island Sports Center Ice Arena • Neville Island, Pennsylvania	MacNicol	W 7–5	874	4–15–2 (1–8–2)
February 2	6:35 pm	at Robert Morris	Island Sports Center Ice Arena • Neville Island, Pennsylvania	MacNicol	L 2–5	893	4–16–2 (1–9–2)
February 8	6:05 pm	at Niagara	Dwyer Arena • Lewiston, New York	MacNicol	T 2–2 ^{OT}	1,142	4–16–3 (1–9–3)
February 9	6:05 pm	at Niagara	Dwyer Arena • Lewiston, New York	MacNicol	L 0–5	1,606	4–17–3 (1–10–3)
February 16	4:05 pm	Wayne State	Von Braun Center • Huntsville, Alabama	Talbot	L 2–4	1,503	4–18–3 (1–11–3)
February 17	2:05 pm	Wayne State	Von Braun Center • Huntsville, Alabama	MacNicol	W 5–2	1,076	5–18–3 (2–11–3)
February 22	5:35 pm	Niagara	Von Braun Center • Huntsville, Alabama	MacNicol	L 0–3	2,373	5–19–3 (2–12–3)
February 23	4:05 pm	Niagara	Von Braun Center • Huntsville, Alabama	MacNicol	W 4–3	2,251	6–19–3 (3–12–3)
March 7	6:35 pm	at Robert Morris	Island Sports Center Ice Arena • Neville Island, Pennsylvania	Talbot	L 3–5	970	6–20–3 (3–13–3)
March 8	6:35 pm	at Robert Morris	Island Sports Center Ice Arena • Neville Island, Pennsylvania	MacNicol	T 2–2 ^{OT}	983	6–20–4 (3–13–4)
March 14	6:00 pm	vs. Wayne State*	Dwyer Arena • Lewiston, New York (CHA Tournament Quarterfinal)	MacNicol	L 0–4	785	6–21–4 (3–13–4)
*Non-conference game. All times are in Central Time.

=== Standings ===
2007–08 College Hockey America standings
	Conference							Overall					
	GP	W	L	T	PTS	GF	GA	GP	W	L	T	GF	GA
Bemidji State†	20	13	4	3	29	71	39	36	17	16	3	102	82
Niagara*	20	12	6	2	26	71	51	37	22	11	4	128	98
Robert Morris	20	10	7	3	23	67	67	34	15	15	4	114	127
Wayne State	20	6	14	0	12	54	71	38	11	25	2	90	132
Alabama–Huntsville	20	3	13	4	10	40	75	31	6	21	4	60	117
Championship: Niagara † indicates conference regular season champion * indicates conference tournament champion Final rankings: USA Today/USA Hockey Magazine Top 15 Poll

=== Statistics ===
==== Skaters ====
Player	Pos	Yr	GP	G	A	Pts	PIM	PPG	SHG	GWG
Brandon Roshko	D	So	30	0	17	17	28	0	0	0
Joe Federoff	C	Jr	31	7	9	16	28	3	0	1
Matt Sweazey	C	Jr	31	9	5	14	46	5	1	1
Scott Kalinchuk	D	Jr	31	3	11	14	38	2	0	0
Josh Murray	RW	Jr	31	8	5	13	20	0	0	0
Andrew Coburn	F	Fr	31	5	8	13	8	3	0	0
Brennan Barker	D	So	30	5	7	12	45	1	0	1
Kevin Morrison	LW	So	31	5	6	11	2	1	0	1
Tom Train	C	So	23	5	4	9	16	0	0	1
Cale Tanaka	LW	So	27	3	6	9	10	0	2	1
Joey Koudys	F	Fr	30	2	5	7	6	0	0	0
Tyler Hilbert	LW	Sr	26	1	6	7	34	0	0	0
Neil Ruffini	F	Fr	24	2	3	5	27	1	0	0
Kyle Goodchild	F	Fr	12	1	4	5	8	0	0	0
Matt Baxter	D	Fr	30	1	3	4	4	0	0	0
Chris Fairbanks	F	Fr	20	2	0	2	0	0	0	0
Kevin Galerno	LW	Jr	17	1	1	2	4	0	0	0
Mike Ward	D	Fr	17	0	2	2	6	0	0	0
Brady Cook	F	Fr	18	0	1	1	14	0	0	0
Ryan Burkholder	D	Fr	24	0	1	1	25	0	0	0
Davide Nicoletti	D	So	28	0	1	1	10	0	0	0
Derek Conter	F	Sr	1	0	0	0	2	0	0	0
Matt Montes	D	Sr	3	0	0	0	2	0	0	0
Vince Bruni	F	Fr	12	0	0	0	6	0	0	0
Cameron Talbot	G	Fr	13	0	0	0	2	0	0	0
Blake MacNicol	G	So	24	0	0	0	0	0	0	0
Team			31	60	105	165	391	16	3	6

==== Goalies ====
Player	Yr	GP	TOI	W	L	T	GA	GAA	SV	SV%	SO
Blake MacNicol	So	24	1296	5	11	4	69	3.19	621	0.900	0
Cameron Talbot	Fr	13	583	1	10	0	45	4.63	277	0.860	0
