= Saskatchewan Huskies men's ice hockey =

- University: University of Saskatchewan
- Conference: Canada West
- Head coach: Brandin Cote; Since 2022–23 season
- Arena: Merlis Belsher Place; Saskatoon, Saskatchewan
- Colors: Green and White

U Sports tournament champions
- 1983

U Sports tournament appearances
- 1967, 1981, 1982, 1983, 1987, 1998, 1999, 2000, 2002, 2005, 2006, 2007, 2008, 2012, 2013, 2014, 2016, 2017, 2018, 2019, 2020, 2025

Conference tournament champions
- 1921, 1923, 1925, 1927, 1929, 1952, 1953, 1967, 1981, 1982, 1983, 1987, 1998, 1999, 2000, 2007, 2012, 2016, 2020, 2025, 2026

Conference regular season champions
- 1919, 1923, 1930, 1959, 1967, 1982, 1983, 1998, 2000, 2016, 2017, 2019, 2020, 2025, 2026

The Saskatchewan Huskies men's ice hockey team is an ice hockey team representing the Saskatchewan Huskies athletics program of University of Saskatchewan. The team is a member of the Canada West Universities Athletic Association conference and compete in U Sports. The Huskies play their home games at the Merlis Belsher Place in Saskatoon, Saskatchewan.

== History ==
Shortly after the founding of the University of Saskatchewan in 1907, the school fielded its first ice hockey team. Sparse records exist for the team before and during World War I, however, by at least 1918 Saskatchewan was playing in the provincial senior league. The following year, the Huskies were founding members of the Western Canadian Intercollegiate Athletic Union (WCIAU) along with Alberta and Manitoba. Unfortunately, travel expenses hampered the league in the early years and it was played on an infrequent basis between the three schools. For the first 20 years of the program, Saskatchewan spent much of its time playing senior hockey and battled the Toronto Granites for the 1923 Allan Cup.

By the mid-30s, Saskatchewan and Alberta finally came to terms on an annual series and stabilized the WCIAU into a permanent fixture. Taking a break only for World War II, the conference played every year from 1936 until 1962. The Huskies weren't able to break Alberta's hold on the crown until 1952, though they pushed the Golden Bears to the limit in most years. In 1962, the CIAU announced that it would be holding its first national ice hockey tournament and would be inviting the champion of four conferences to participate. The WCIAU rebranded as the Western Canadian Intercollegiate Athletic Association (WCIAA) with Saskatchewan as one of four founding members. The Huskies won the title in 1967 to make their first appearance in the University Cup. The program would have to wait quite a while for their next trip but, by the early 80s, Saskatchewan was ready to cash in on their opportunity. Now in Canada West The team finished as national runners-up in '81 and '82 before finally winning the championship in 1983.

Saskatchewan would make only one trip back to the tournament over the next 15 years, however, by the late 1990s, the program was able to regain some of its past glory. The 21st century proved much more successful for the Huskies as the team made 13 trips to the University Cup in the first two decades. Three of those years ended with a loss in the championship game, leaving Saskatchewan with an unenviable record of 1–6 in the national final (as of 2024).

== Season-by-season results ==
=== Senior and collegiate play ===
Note: GP = Games played, W = Wins, L = Losses, T = Ties, Pts = Points

Extra-League Champion	U Sports Semifinalist	Conference regular season champions	Conference Division Champions	Conference Playoff Champions

Season	Conference	Regular Season											Conference Tournament Results	National Tournament Results
Season	Conference	Conference						Overall					Conference Tournament Results	National Tournament Results
Season	Conference	GP	W	L	T	Pts*	Finish	GP	W	L	T	%	Conference Tournament Results	National Tournament Results
1909–10	Saskatchewan Sr.	?	?	?	?	?	?	?	?	?	?	?		
1910–11	Saskatchewan Sr.	?	?	?	?	?	?	?	?	?	?	?		
1911–12	Saskatchewan Sr.	?	?	?	?	?	?	?	?	?	?	?		
1912–13	Saskatchewan Sr.	?	?	?	?	?	?	?	?	?	?	?		
1913–14	Saskatchewan Sr.	?	?	?	?	?	?	?	?	?	?	?		
1914–15	Saskatchewan Sr.	?	?	?	?	?	?	?	?	?	?	?		
1915–16	Saskatchewan Sr.	?	?	?	?	?	?	?	?	?	?	?		
1916–17	Saskatchewan Sr.	?	?	?	?	?	?	?	?	?	?	?		
1917–18	Saskatchewan Sr.	?	?	?	?	?	?	?	?	?	?	?		
1918–19	Saskatoon City	4	2	2	0	2	1st	?	?	?	?	?	Lost Saskatchewan Championship, 0–8 (Regina Victorias)	
1919–20	WCIAU	4	1	3	0	2	3rd	?	?	?	?	?		
1920–21	Saskatoon League	8	2	6	0	4	3rd	?	?	?	?	?	Lost Championship series, 10–14 (Edmonton Victorias)	Lost Allan Cup Western Semifinal series, 6–17 (Port Arthur North Ends)
1920–21	WCIAU	0	0	0	0	0	—	?	?	?	?	?	Won Championship series, 9–5 (Manitoba)	
1921–22	WCIAU	0	0	0	0	0	—	?	?	?	?	?	Lost Championship series, 6–9 (Manitoba)	
1922–23	Saskatoon-Rosetown	6	5	1	0	10	T–1st	?	?	?	?	?		Won Allan Cup Western Quarterfinal series, 5–4 (Weyburn Wanderers); Won Allan Cup Western Semifinal series, 8–5 (Vancouver Young Liberals); Won Allan Cup Western Final series, 7–6 (Souris); Lost Allan Cup Championship series, 2–11 (Toronto Granites)
1922–23	WCIAU	0	0	0	0	0	—	?	?	?	?	?	Won Championship, forfeit (Manitoba)	Won Allan Cup Western Quarterfinal series, 5–4 (Weyburn Wanderers); Won Allan Cup Western Semifinal series, 8–5 (Vancouver Young Liberals); Won Allan Cup Western Final series, 7–6 (Souris); Lost Allan Cup Championship series, 2–11 (Toronto Granites)
1923–24	Saskatchewan North	6	4	2	0	8	2nd	?	?	?	?	?	Lost Northern Final series, 5–6 (Saskatoon Nationals)	
1923–24	WCIAU	0	0	0	0	0	—	?	?	?	?	?	Lost Championship, 1–8 (Manitoba)	
1924–25	Saskatchewan North	5	1	4	0	2	2nd	?	?	?	?	?		
1924–25	WCIAU	0	0	0	0	0	—	?	?	?	?	?	Won Championship, 6–2 (Alberta)	
1925–26	Saskatoon City	3	0	3	0	0	2nd	?	?	?	?	?		
1926–27	WCIAU	0	0	0	0	0	—	?	?	?	?	?	Won Championship, 4–1 (Alberta)	
1927–28	Saskatoon City	3	0	3	0	0	4th	?	?	?	?	?		
1928–29	WCIAU	0	0	0	0	0	—	?	?	?	?	?	Won Championship, 5–1 (Alberta)	
1929–30	WCIAU	4	4	0	0	8	1st	?	?	?	?	?		
1930–31	Saskatchewan North	20	9	9	2	20	4th	?	?	?	?	?		
1931–32	?	?	?	?	?	?	?	?	?	?	?	?		
1932–33	?	?	?	?	?	?	?	?	?	?	?	?		
1933–34	WCIAU	0	0	0	0	0	—	?	?	?	?	?	Lost Championship series, 4–6 (Alberta)	
1934–35	Northern Saskatchewan	23	2	21	0	4	5th	?	?	?	?	?		
1935–36	WCIAU	0	0	0	0	0	—	?	?	?	?	?	Lost Championship series, 11–12 (Alberta)	
1936–37	WCIAU	0	0	0	0	0	—	?	?	?	?	?	Lost Championship series, 10–11 (Alberta)	
1937–38	WCIAU	0	0	0	0	0	—	?	?	?	?	?	Lost Championship series, 14–18 (Alberta)	
1938–39	WCIAU	0	0	0	0	0	—	?	?	?	?	?	Lost Championship series, 16–25 (Alberta)	
1939–40	WCIAU	8	3	2	3	9	2nd	?	?	?	?	?		
Program suspended due to World War II
1945–46	WCIAU	0	0	0	0	0	—	?	?	?	?	?	Lost Championship series, 16–20 (Alberta)	
1946–47	WCIAU	6	1	5	0	2	3rd	?	?	?	?	?		
1947–48	WCIAU	0	0	0	0	0	—	?	?	?	?	?	Lost Championship series, 14–16 (Alberta)	
1948–49	WCIAU	0	0	0	0	0	—	?	?	?	?	?	Lost Championship series, 1–4–1 (Alberta)	
1949–50	WCIAU	0	0	0	0	0	—	?	?	?	?	?	Lost Championship series, 3–4 (Alberta)	
1950–51	WCIAU	0	0	0	0	0	—	?	?	?	?	?	Lost Championship series, 2–3 (Alberta)	
1951–52	WCIAU	0	0	0	0	0	—	?	?	?	?	?	Won Championship series, 3–1 (Alberta)	
1952–53	WCIAU	0	0	0	0	0	—	?	?	?	?	?	Won Championship series, 3–2 (Alberta)	
1953–54	WCIAU	0	0	0	0	0	—	?	?	?	?	?	Lost Championship series, 2–3 (Alberta)	
1954–55	WCIAU	8	4	4	0	8	2nd	?	?	?	?	?		
1955–56	WCIAU	0	0	0	0	0	—	?	?	?	?	?	Lost Championship series, 1–3 (Alberta)	
1956–57	WCIAU	10	3	7	0	6	3rd	?	?	?	?	?		
1957–58	WCIAU	12	8	4	0	16	2nd	?	?	?	?	?		
1958–59	WCIAU	8	6	2	0	12	1st	?	?	?	?	?		
1959–60	WCIAU	8	1	7	0	2	3rd	?	?	?	?	?		
1960–61	WCIAU	8	4	4	0	8	2nd	?	?	?	?	?		
1961–62	WCIAU	12	5	7	0	10	2nd	?	?	?	?	?		
Totals								GP	W	L	T	%	Championships	
Regular Season								?	?	?	?	?	2 Saskatoon Championships, 2 WCIAU Championships	
Conference Post-season								?	?	?	?	?	7 WCIAU Championships	
Regular Season and Postseason Record								?	?	?	?	?		

=== Collegiate only ===
Note: GP = Games played, W = Wins, L = Losses, T = Ties, OTL = Overtime Losses, SOL = Shootout Losses, Pts = Points

U Sports Champion	U Sports Semifinalist	Conference regular season champions	Conference Division Champions	Conference Playoff Champions

Season	Conference	Regular Season													Conference Tournament Results	National Tournament Results
Season	Conference	Conference								Overall					Conference Tournament Results	National Tournament Results
Season	Conference	GP	W	L	T	OTL	SOL	Pts*	Finish	GP	W	L	T	%	Conference Tournament Results	National Tournament Results
1962–63	WCIAA	12	7	4	1	–	–	15	2nd	12	7	4	1	.625		
1963–64	WCIAA	12	5	7	0	–	–	10	4th	12	5	7	0	.417		
1964–65	WCIAA	12	7	5	0	–	–	14	T–2nd	12	7	5	0	.583		
1965–66	WCIAA	12	5	7	0	–	–	10	3rd	12	5	7	0	.417		
1966–67	WCIAA	16	13	3	0	–	–	26	T–1st	19	14	5	0	.737	Won Championship, 4–3 (Alberta)	Lost Semifinal, 4–7 (Laurentian); Lost Consolation Final, 2–8 (St. Francis Xavier)
1967–68	WCIAA	16	10	6	0	–	–	20	T–2nd	16	10	6	0	.625		
1968–69	WCIAA	20	13	7	0	–	–	26	2nd	20	13	7	0	.650		
1969–70	WCIAA	14	6	8	0	–	–	12	6th	14	6	8	0	.429		
1970–71	WCIAA	20	10	10	0	–	–	20	5th	20	10	10	0	.500		
1971–72	WCIAA	20	7	13	0	–	–	14	7th	20	7	13	0	.350		
1972–73	Canada West	24	11	13	0	–	–	22	4th	24	11	13	0	.458		
1973–74	Canada West	18	2	16	0	–	–	4	4th	18	2	16	0	.111		
1974–75	Canada West	24	4	20	0	–	–	8	4th	24	4	20	0	.167		
1975–76	Canada West	24	3	21	0	–	–	6	4th	24	3	21	0	.125		
1976–77	Canada West	24	5	19	0	–	–	10	4th	24	5	19	0	.208		
1977–78	Canada West	24	3	21	0	–	–	6	4th	24	3	21	0	.125		
1978–79	Canada West	24	6	18	0	–	–	12	4th	24	6	18	0	.250		
1979–80	Canada West	29	14	15	0	–	–	28	3rd	29	14	15	0	.483		
1980–81	Canada West	24	15	9	0	–	–	30	2nd	30	19	11	0	.633	Won Championship series, 2–1 (Calgary)	Won Pool 2 Round-ronin, 8–3 (Concordia), 5–4 (Queen's); Lost Championship, 2–4 (Moncton)
1981–82	Canada West	24	17	7	0	–	–	34	1st	29	21	8	0	.724	Won Championship series, 2–0 (Calgary)	Won Pool 1 Round-ronin, 4–3 (Concordia), 8–2 (Regina); Lost Championship, 2–3 (Moncton)
1982–83	Canada West	24	16	8	0	–	–	32	1st	29	21	8	0	.724	Won Championship series, 2–0 (Alberta)	Won Pool 2 Round-ronin, 6–2 (Brandon), 10–1 (Wilfrid Laurier); Won Championship, 6–2 (Concordia)
1983–84	Canada West	24	14	10	0	–	–	28	2nd	26	14	12	0	.538	Lost Championship series, 0–2 (Alberta)	
1984–85	Canada West	24	16	8	0	–	–	32	2nd	26	16	10	0	.667	Lost Championship series, 0–2 (Alberta)	
1985–86	Canada West	28	16	12	0	–	–	32	4th	32	18	14	0	.563	Won Semifinal series, 2–1 (Alberta); Lost Championship series, 1–2 (Calgary)	
1986–87	Canada West	28	16	11	1	–	–	33	4th	37	22	14	1	.608	Won Semifinal series, 2–1 (Manitoba); Won Championship series, 2–1 (Calgary)	Won Pool 1 Round-ronin, 3–0 (Prince Edward Island), 5–2 (Western Ontario); Lost Championship, 3–6 (Quebec–Trois-Rivières)
1987–88	Canada West	28	22	5	1	–	–	45	T–2nd	31	23	7	1	.758	Lost Semifinal series, 1–2 (Alberta)	
1988–89	Canada West	28	19	9	0	–	–	38	3rd	31	20	11	0	.645	Lost Semifinal series, 1–2 (Calgary)	
1989–90	Canada West	28	10	16	2	–	–	22	7th	28	10	16	2	.393		
1990–91	Canada West	28	12	12	4	–	–	28	3rd	30	12	14	4	.467	Lost Semifinal series, 0–2 (Alberta)	
1991–92	Canada West	28	13	14	1	–	–	27	T–5th	28	13	14	1	.482		
1992–93	Canada West	28	16	9	3	–	–	35	4th	30	16	11	3	.583	Lost Semifinal series, 0–2 (Alberta)	
1993–94	Canada West	28	7	19	2	–	–	16	7th	28	7	19	2	.286		
1994–95	Canada West	28	7	20	1	–	–	15	8th	28	7	20	1	.268		
1995–96	Canada West	28	11	14	3	–	–	25	5th	31	12	16	3	.435	Lost Division Semifinal series, 1–2 (Regina)	
1996–97	Canada West	26	15	9	2	–	–	32	3rd	30	17	11	2	.600	Won Division Final series, 2–0 (Manitoba); Lost Championship series, 0–2 (Alberta)	
1997–98	Canada West	28	19	4	5	–	–	43	T–1st	36	23	8	5	.708	Won Division Final series, 2–1 (Manitoba); Won Championship series, 2–1 (Alberta)	Lost Pool B Round-robin, 3–5 (Quebec–Trois-Rivières), 5–6 (Acadia)
1998–99	Canada West	28	18	9	1	–	–	37	2nd	34	23	10	1	.691	Won Division Final series, 2–0 (Manitoba); Won Championship series, 2–0 (Alberta)	Lost Pool B Round-robin, 4–5 (Moncton), 3–1 (Windsor)
1999–00	Canada West	28	22	3	3	–	–	47	1st	35	27	5	3	.814	Won Division Final series, 2–0 (Brandon); Won Championship series, 2–1 (Alberta)	Lost Pool A Round-robin, 3–2 (Western Ontario), 4–5 (New Brunswick)
2000–01	Canada West	28	14	10	4	–	–	32	3rd	33	17	12	4	.714	Won Division Semifinal series, 2–0 (Regina); Lost Division Final series, 1–2 (Manitoba)	
2001–02	Canada West	28	17	8	3	–	–	37	2nd	34	19	12	3	.603	Won Semifinal series, 2–0 (Calgary); Lost Championship series, 0–2 (Alberta)	Lost Pool B Round-robin, 3–5 (Quebec–Trois-Rivières), 1–3 (Saint Mary's)
2002–03	Canada West	28	16	10	2	–	–	34	2nd	33	19	12	2	.606	Won Division Final series, 2–0 (Manitoba); Lost Championship series, 1–2 (Alberta)	
2003–04	Canada West	28	15	9	4	–	–	34	2nd	32	17	11	4	.594	Won Division Final series, 2–0 (Regina); Lost Championship series, 0–2 (Alberta)	
2004–05	Canada West	28	19	6	3	–	–	41	2nd	35	23	9	3	.700	Won Division Final series, 2–0 (Manitoba); Lost Championship series, 0–2 (Alberta)	Won Pool B Round-robin, 3–0 (Moncton), 3–0 (Western Ontario); Lost Championship, 4–5 (OT) (Alberta)
2005–06	Canada West	28	17	7	4	–	–	38	2nd	34	20	10	4	.647	Won Division Final series, 2–0 (Manitoba); Lost Championship series, 0–2 (Alberta)	Lost Pool B Round-robin, 5–1 (Acadia), 3–4 (Lakehead)
2006–07	Canada West	28	16	9	–	3	–	35	2nd	34	20	14	0	.588	Won Division Final series, 2–0 (Calgary); Won Championship series, 2–0 (Alberta)	Lost Pool B Round-robin, 1–2 (New Brunswick), 2–3 (Quebec–Trois-Rivières)
2007–08	Canada West	28	17	5	–	6	–	40	2nd	34	20	14	0	.588	Won Semifinal series, 2–0 (Calgary); Lost Championship series, 0–2 (Alberta)	Won Pool A Round-robin, 4–1 (Brock), 0–4 (New Brunswick)
2008–09	Canada West	28	17	9	–	1	1	36	2nd	32	19	12	1	.609	Won Semifinal series, 2–0 (British Columbia); Lost Championship series, 0–2 (Alberta)	
2009–10	Canada West	28	16	8	–	3	1	36	2nd	30	16	13	1	.550	Lost Semifinal series, 0–2 (Manitoba)	
2010–11	Canada West	28	17	11	–	0	0	34	3rd	30	17	13	0	.567	Lost Semifinal series, 0–2 (Calgary)	
2011–12	Canada West	28	19	6	–	3	0	41	3rd	38	26	12	0	.684	Won Quarterfinal series, 2–0 (Lethbridge); Won Semifinal series, 2–1 (Alberta); Won Championship series, 2–1 (Calgary)	Lost Pool B Round-robin, 1–5 (Moncton), 4–3 (McGill)
2012–13	Canada West	28	19	8	–	0	1	39	2nd	36	22	13	1	.625	Won Semifinal series, 2–1 (Manitoba); Lost Championship series, 1–2 (Alberta)	Lost Pool B Round-robin, 1–3 (New Brunswick), 1–3 (Quebec–Trois-Rivières)
2013–14	Canada West	28	17	10	–	1	0	35	3rd	34	20	14	0	.588	Lost Quarterfinal series, 1–2 (British Columbia)	Won Pool B Round-robin, 3–2 (Acadia), 9–0 (Windsor); Lost Championship, 1–3 (Alberta)
2014–15	Canada West	28	10	15	–	1	2	23	6th	31	11	18	2	.387	Lost Quarterfinal series, 1–2 (Mount Royal)	
2015–16	Canada West	28	22	6	–	0	0	40	1st	36	27	9	0	.750	Won Semifinal series, 2–0 (Calgary); Won Championship series, 2–1 (Alberta)	Won Quarterfinal, 3–2 (OT) (Carleton); Lost Semifinal, 1–2 (OT) (St. Francis Xavier); Lost Bronze Medal Game, 2–5 (Saint Mary's)
2016–17	Canada West	28	21	5	–	1	1	44	1st	36	26	9	1	.736	Won Semifinal series, 2–0 (Mount Royal); Lost Championship series, 1–2 (Alberta)	Won Quarterfinal, 1–0 (OT) (York); Won Semifinal, 8–0 (St. Francis Xavier); Lost Championship, 3–5 (New Brunswick)
2017–18	Canada West	28	20	7	–	1	0	41	2nd	36	23	13	0	.639	Won Semifinal series, 2–1 (Calgary); Lost Championship series, 0–2 (Alberta)	Won Quarterfinal, 1–0 (OT) (McGill); Lost Semifinal, 2–3 (OT) (Alberta); Lost Bronze Medal Game, 4–5 (OT) (New Brunswick)
2018–19	Canada West	28	25	3	–	0	0	50	1st	36	29	7	0	.806	Won Semifinal series, 2–0 (Mount Royal); Lost Championship series, 1–2 (Alberta)	Won Quarterfinal, 6–1 (Guelph); Lost Semifinal, 0–3 (Alberta); Lost Bronze Medal Game, 1–5 (St. Francis Xavier)
2019–20	Canada West	28	22	4	–	2	0	46	T–1st	33	26	7	0	.788	Won Semifinal series, 2–0 (Calgary); Won Championship series, 2–0 (British Columbia)	Lost Quarterfinal, 2–3 (Western Ontario)
2020–21	Season cancelled due to COVID-19 pandemic															
2021–22	Canada West	20	13	7	–	0	0	26	4th	23	14	9	0	.609	Won Quarterfinal series, 1–2 (Calgary)	
2022–23	Canada West	28	14	10	–	4	0	32	2nd	34	17	17	0	.500	Won Quarterfinal series, 2–1 (Regina); Lost Semifinal series, 1–2 (Calgary)	
2023–24	Canada West	28	20	6	–	1	1	42	4th	31	21	9	1	.694	Lost Quarterfinal series, 1–2 (Alberta)	
2024–25	Canada West	28	23	5	–	0	0	46	1st	45	38	7	0	.844	Won Semifinal series, 2–1 (British Columbia); Won Championship series, 2–1 (Mount Royal)	Won Quarterfinal, 4–2 (Queen's); Lost Semifinal, 0–3 (Concordia); Won Bronze Medal Game, 4–1 (Toronto Metropolitan)
Totals										GP	W	L	T/SOL	%	Championships	
Regular Season										1548	860	631	57	.574	1 WCIAA Championship, 9 Canada West Championships, 10 Great Plains Division Titles	
Conference Post-season										157	86	71	0	.548	1 WCIAA Championship, 12 Canada West Championships	
U Sports Postseason										54	25	29	0	.463	22 National tournament appearances	
Regular Season and Postseason Record										1759	971	731	57	.568	1 National Championship	

Totals include games since 1962–63.
Note: Games not counted towards University Cup appearances are not included.

== See also ==
Saskatchewan Huskies women's ice hockey
