= Derek Hulak =

Canadian ice hockey player (b. 1989)

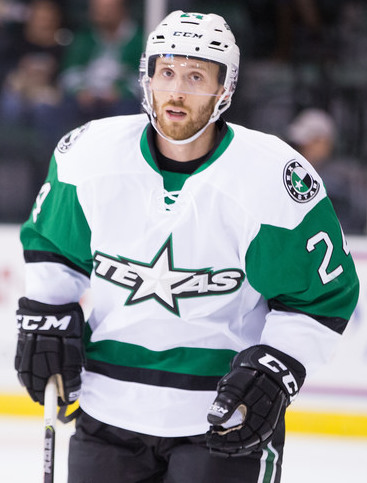
- Hulak with the Texas Stars during the 2015-16 season
- Born: September 2, 1989 (age 36) Saskatoon, Saskatchewan, Canada
- Height: 6 ft 0 in (183 cm)
- Weight: 185 lb (84 kg; 13 st 3 lb)
- Position: Forward
- Shoots: Left
- SL team Former teams: HC Thurgau; Texas Stars; Utica Comets; Hershey Bears; Grand Rapids Griffins; Manitoba Moose
- NHL draft: Undrafted
- Playing career: 2014–present

Derek Hulak (born September 2, 1989) is a Canadian professional ice hockey forward who is currently playing for HC Thurgau of the Swiss League (SL).

== Playing career ==
While attending the University of Saskatchewan, Hulak played for the Saskatchewan Huskies from 2010–11 to 2013–14. While the Huskies were defeated in the 2014 CIS University Cup national championship final, Hulak won the Major W.J. "Danny" McLeod Award as Most Valuable Player of the national championship tournament.

Undrafted out of university, Hulak joined the Texas Stars of the American Hockey League (AHL). He won a Calder Cup with the Stars in 2014.

In 2016, Hulak signed a one-year contract with the Utica Comets after two full seasons with the Stars.

After enduring the 2016–17 season interrupted through injury with the Comets, Hulak left as a free agent to sign with his third AHL club, the Lehigh Valley Phantoms on a one-year deal on July 6, 2017. Hulak was unable to make an appearance with the Phantoms through the entire 2017–18 season, due to continuing injury woes.

On October 5, 2018, the Hershey Bears signed Hulak to a professional tryout (PTO), making the opening night roster for the 2018–19 season. Hulak appeared in eight games through to December, recording two goals and one assist, before he was released from his tryout on December 4. On December 5, the Grand Rapids Griffins signed Hulak to a PTO. He posted 1 goal in 9 games with the Griffins before securing a one-year contract for the remainder of the season with the club on December 28, 2018.

As a free agent from the Griffins Hulak was unable to secure a contract over the summer. Hulak accepted an invitation to attend the Manitoba Moose training camp and was later signed to a professional tryout contract to begin the 2019–20 season on October 4, 2019. Hulak made 18 appearances posting 3 points before the season was ended prematurely due to the COVID-19 pandemic.

On July 27, 2020, Hulak signed his first contract abroad, agreeing to a one-year deal with Swiss second tiered club, HC Thurgau of the Swiss League.

== Personal life ==
His brother is Dan Hulak, a former ice hockey player. He was drafted by the Tampa Bay Lightning in the 1998 NHL entry draft.

== Career statistics ==
			Regular season					Playoffs
Season	Team	League	GP	G	A	Pts	PIM	GP	G	A	Pts	PIM
2005–06	Regina Pats	WHL	1	0	0	0	0	1	0	0	0	0
2006–07	Regina Pats	WHL	19	6	4	10	12	—	—	—	—	—
2006–07	Saskatoon Blades	WHL	31	12	14	26	14	—	—	—	—	—
2007–08	Saskatoon Blades	WHL	72	16	30	46	36	—	—	—	—	—
2008–09	Saskatoon Blades	WHL	72	30	46	76	50	7	3	4	7	4
2009–10	Saskatoon Blades	WHL	72	31	53	84	71	10	2	7	39	4
2010–11	Tulsa Oilers	CHL	21	4	10	14	0	—	—	—	—	—
2010–11	University of Saskatchewan	CIS	11	2	4	6	0	1	0	1	1	0
2011–12	University of Saskatchewan	CIS	28	11	33	44	14	8	1	7	8	6
2012–13	University of Saskatchewan	CIS	20	8	17	25	8	6	4	4	8	0
2013–14	University of Saskatchewan	CIS	28	13	35	48	12	3	2	1	3	4
2013–14	Texas Stars	AHL	5	1	1	2	62	3	0	0	0	0
2014–15	Texas Stars	AHL	68	21	23	44	26	3	0	0	0	0
2015–16	Texas Stars	AHL	69	17	23	40	16	4	1	0	1	0
2016–17	Utica Comets	AHL	17	4	1	5	4	—	—	—	—	—
2018–19	Hershey Bears	AHL	8	2	1	3	0	—	—	—	—	—
2018–19	Grand Rapids Griffins	AHL	35	1	3	4	6	4	1	1	2	0
2019–20	Manitoba Moose	AHL	18	2	1	3	10	—	—	—	—	—
AHL totals			220	48	53	101	124	14	2	1	3	0
