= WCIAU men's ice hockey tournament =

Western Canadian Intercollegiate Athletic Union men's ice hockey tournament
- Conference hockey championship
- Sport: Ice hockey
- Conference: Western Canadian Intercollegiate Athletic Union
- Format: Single-elimination
- Played: 1920–1962
- Winner trophy: Halpenny Trophy; Hardy Trophy

The Western Canadian Intercollegiate Athletic Union ice hockey tournament was an annual conference championship held between member teams.

== History ==
Shortly After World War I, the Western Canadian Intercollegiate Athletic Union (WCIAU) was organized. Schools from western Canada had played one another before the war but did not formalize any arrangement until 1919. Initially, the ice hockey division possessed only three conference members but the league was hampered when Alberta withdrew after the inaugural year. With only Manitoba and Saskatchewan as members, the hockey league existed in name only for several years, sometimes not even being contested. Manitoba stopped competing in the late 20s and the league was abandoned until Alberta agreed to play season series with Saskatchewan. However, the WCIAU remained a curiosity until the 1950s.

In 1956, Manitoba returned as full time members and were joined by Brandon, bringing the conference up to four members for the first time. This situation only lasted for two years before Brandon withdrew and the league continued on as a trio. In 1962, the conference dissolved and reformed as the Western Canadian Intercollegiate Athletic Association (WCIAA).

The Halpenny Trophy was donated by Dr. J Halpenny of the University of Saskatchewan in 1922. After winning the trophy every year of competition after 1933, it was permanently given to Alberta in 1950. Afterwards, the Hardy Trophy was awarded to the league champion.

== Tournaments ==
=== 1920 ===
Seed	School	Standings
1	Manitoba	3–1–0
2	Alberta	2–2–0
3	Saskatchewan	1–3–0

No playoff

=== 1921 ===
No regular season play

Championship; January 22, February 5
Manitoba	2	3	5
Saskatchewan	1	8	9

=== 1922 ===
No regular season play

Championship; January 28, February 18
Manitoba	4	5	9
Saskatchewan	2	4	6

=== 1923 ===
No regular season play
Manitoba declared champion due to Saskatchewan using ineligible players.

=== 1924 ===
No regular season play

Championship; February 9
Manitoba	8
Saskatchewan	1

=== 1925 ===
No regular season play

Championship; January 29
Alberta	2
Saskatchewan	6

Single exhibition game

=== 1926 ===
not contested

=== 1927 ===
No regular season play

Championship; February 12
Alberta	1
Saskatchewan	4

=== 1928 ===
not contested

=== 1929 ===
No regular season play

Championship; February 22
Alberta	1
Saskatchewan	5

Single exhibition game

=== 1930 ===
Seed	School	Standings
1	Saskatchewan	4–0–0
2	Manitoba	2–2–0
3	Alberta	0–4–0

No playoff

=== 1931 ===
not contested

=== 1932 ===
not contested

=== 1933 ===
not contested

=== 1934 ===
No regular season play

Championship; January 20, 22, 26, 27
Alberta	3	0	1	2	6
Saskatchewan	1	0	3	0	4

=== 1935 ===
not contested

=== 1936 ===
No regular season play

Championship; January 25, 27, February 8, 10
Alberta	3	3	3	3	12
Saskatchewan	1	3	3	4	11

=== 1937 ===
No regular season play

Championship; February 6, 8, 20, 22
Alberta	2	4	2	3	11
Saskatchewan	1	6	0	3	10

=== 1938 ===
No regular season play

Championship; January 22, 24, February 5, 7
Alberta	2	5	6	5	18
Saskatchewan	3	2	4	5	14

=== 1939 ===
No regular season play

Championship; January 21, 23, February 4, 6
Alberta	7	6	6	6	25
Saskatchewan	2	5	6	3	16

=== 1940 ===
Seed	School	Standings
1	Alberta	4–0–4
2	Saskatchewan	3–2–3
3	Manitoba	1–6–1

No playoff

=== 1941–1945 ===
League suspended due to World War II

=== 1946 ===
No regular season play

Championship; February 22, 24, March 1, 2
Alberta	8	5	3	4	20
Saskatchewan	6	3	2	5	16

=== 1947 ===
Seed	School	Standings
1	Alberta	5–1–0
2	Manitoba	2–2–0
3	Saskatchewan	1–5–0

Manitoba's games were worth 4 points each no playoff

=== 1948 ===
No regular season play

Championship; January 30, 31, February 13, 14
Alberta	4	3	2	7	16
Saskatchewan	8	0	5	1	14

=== 1949 ===
No regular season play

Championship; January 14, 15, 21, 22, 29, February 12
Alberta	5	4	5	5	7	6
Saskatchewan	7	3	4	5	6	5

=== 1950 ===
No regular season play

Championship
Alberta	3	4	6	4	2	3	4
Saskatchewan	3	8	4	3	3	2	1

=== 1951 ===
No regular season play

Championship; January 26, 27, February 5, 6, 7
Alberta	5	3	5	4	7
Saskatchewan	6	4	1	0	3

=== 1952 ===
No regular season play

Championship; January 25, 26, February 8, 9
Alberta	4	6	1	1
Saskatchewan	6	3	3	3

=== 1953 ===
No regular season play

Championship; January 23, 24, February 13, 14, 15
Alberta	3	1	5	4	4
Saskatchewan	1	2	6	0	9

=== 1954 ===
No regular season play

Championship; January 22, 23, February 11, 12, 13
Alberta	5	4	3	4	6
Saskatchewan	3	1	4	6	4

=== 1955 ===
Seed	School	Standings
1	Alberta	6–2–0
2	Saskatchewan	4–4–0
3	Brandon	2–6–0

no playoff

=== 1956 ===
No regular season play

Championship; January 20, 21, February 24, 25
Alberta	2	3	8	5
Saskatchewan	3	2	4	2

=== 1957 ===
Seed	School	Standings
1	Alberta	10–0–0
2	Manitoba	6–2–0
3	Saskatchewan	3–7–0
4	Brandon	1–11–0

Manitoba cancelled its final 4 games due to poor ice and travel issues
no playoff

=== 1958 ===
Seed	School	Standings
1	Alberta	11–1–0
2	Saskatchewan	8–4–0
3	Manitoba	3–9–0
4	Brandon	2–10–0

no playoff

=== 1959 ===
Seed	School	Standings
1	Saskatchewan	6–2–0
2	Alberta	4–4–0
3	Manitoba	2–6–0

no playoff

=== 1960 ===
Seed	School	Standings
1	Alberta	7–1–0
2	Manitoba	4–4–0
3	Saskatchewan	1–7–0

no playoff

=== 1961 ===
Seed	School	Standings
1	Alberta	7–0–1
2	Saskatchewan	4–4–0
3	Manitoba	0–7–1

no playoff

=== 1962 ===
Seed	School	Standings
1	Alberta	11–1–0
2	Saskatchewan	5–7–0
3	British Columbia	0–8–0

The eight games between Alberta and Saskatchewan were worth 1 point in the standings.
All of British Columbia's games were worth 2 points.
no playoff

== Championships ==
School	Championships
Alberta	20
Saskatchewan	8
Manitoba	4

== See also ==
- WCIAA men's ice hockey tournament
- GPAC men's ice hockey tournament
- Canada West men's ice hockey tournament
