= Victoria Vikes men's ice hockey =

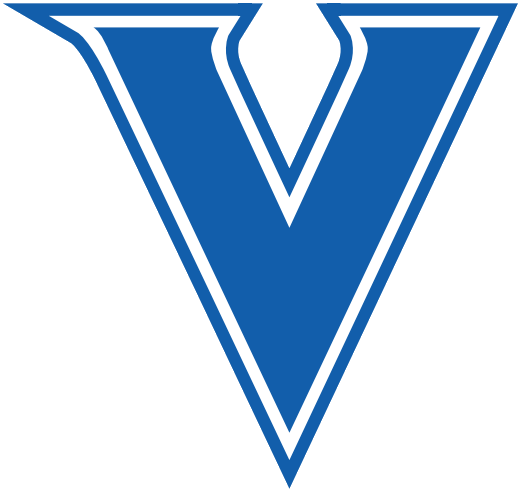
- University: University of Victoria
- Conference: BCIHL
- First season: 1969–70
- Head coach: Alec Dillon
- Arena: Victoria, British Columbia
- Colors: Blue and Gold

Conference tournament champions
- 2007, 2009, 2012, 2017, 2025

The Victoria Vikes men's ice hockey team is a club ice hockey team made up of students from the University of Victoria. The team has been a member of the British Columbia Intercollegiate Hockey League since 2006 and previously competed in U Sports. The Vikes play their home games at the Ian Stewart Complex in Victoria, British Columbia.

== History ==
Victoria joined a growing number of schools in Western Canada when they founded their varsity ice hockey team in 1969. The then-named Vikings became members of the Western Canadian Intercollegiate Athletic Association (WCIAA) and got off to a predictably poor start. After going winless in their inaugural season, the team showed some improvement with three wins in year two. Unfortunately, the team regressed afterwards, going winless for a second time in 1972. That summer, the WCIAA was split into two conferences as a way to help teams cut down on travel costs. In their new league, Canada West Universities Athletic Association, the Vikings remained a bottom-feeder, losing all 24 of their contests and averaging less than 2 goals per game. Despite the lesser operating costs, the program was still expensive to run. After very little to show for their efforts over four seasons, the school decided to end the program.

More than 30 years later, Victoria returned to the ice when the British Columbia Intercollegiate Hockey League was formed. The Vikes were one of the early luminaries of the conference, winning the championship three times in the first six seasons. Despite the team's success, the university has yet to show any interest in returning the club to varsity status.

== Season-by-season results ==
=== Varsity ===
Note: GP = Games played, W = Wins, L = Losses, T = Ties, OTL = Overtime Losses, SOL = Shootout Losses, Pts = Points

U Sports Champion	U Sports Semifinalist	Conference regular season champions	Conference Division Champions	Conference Playoff Champions

Season	Conference	Regular Season													Conference Tournament Results	National Tournament Results
Season	Conference	Conference								Overall					Conference Tournament Results	National Tournament Results
Season	Conference	GP	W	L	T	OTL	SOL	Pts*	Finish	GP	W	L	T	%	Conference Tournament Results	National Tournament Results
1969–70	WCIAA	14	0	14	0	–	–	0	8th	14	0	14	0	.000		
1970–71	WCIAA	20	3	17	0	–	–	6	8th	20	3	17	0	.150		
1971–72	WCIAA	20	0	20	0	–	–	0	8th	20	0	20	0	.000		
1972–73	Canada West	24	0	24	0	–	–	0	5th	24	0	24	0	.000		
Program suspended
Totals										GP	W	L	T/SOL	%	Championships	
Regular Season										78	3	75	0	.038		
Conference Post-season										0	0	0	0	–		
U Sports Postseason										0	0	0	0	–		
Regular Season and Postseason Record										78	3	75	0	.038		

Note: Games not counted towards University Cup appearances are not included.
