= 2014 CIS University Cup =

2014 Potashcorp CIS University Cup Presented By Co-Op
Tournament details
- Venue(s): Credit Union Centre, Saskatoon, Saskatchewan
- Dates: March 20–23, 2014
- Teams: 6

Final positions
- Champions: Alberta Golden Bears (14th title)
- Runners-up: Saskatchewan Huskies

Tournament statistics
- Games played: 7
- Attendance: 41,089 (5,870 per game)

Awards
- MVP: Derek Hulak (Saskatchewan)

The 2014 CIS Men's University Cup Hockey Tournament (52nd Annual) was held March 20–23, 2014. It was the second of two consecutive CIS Championships to be held at the Credit Union Centre in Saskatoon hosted by the University of Saskatchewan. The defending champions were the UNB Varsity Reds, but they would not be able to defend their title, having been eliminated in the second round of the AUS playoffs by the Saint Mary's Huskies.

== Road to the Cup ==
=== AUS playoffs ===
The AUS were held from February 19 to March 10, 2014.

Quarter-finals (Best of 3)
5	Saint Mary's Huskies	2
4	UPEI Panthers	1
6	St. Francis Xavier X-Men	0
3	Moncton Aigles Bleu	2

Semi-finals (Best of 5)
1	UNB Varsity Reds	1
5	Saint Mary's Huskies	3
2	Acadia Axemen	3
3	Moncton Aigles Bleu	1

AUS Championship (Best of 5)
5	Saint Mary's Huskies	1
2	Acadia Axemen	3

=== OUA playoffs ===
The OUA playoffs were held from February 19 to March 15, 2014.

Division Quarter-finals (Best of 3); OUA Sweet 16	Division Semi-finals (Best of 3); OUA Quarter-Finals
6E	Concordia Stingers	0
3E	McGill Redmen	2
3E	McGill Redmen	2
2E	UQTR Patriots	0
7E	UOIT Ridgebacks	0
2E	UQTR Patriotes	2
OUA East
5E	Ottawa Gee-Gees	0
4E	Queen's Golden Gaels	2
4E	Queen's Golden Gaels	1
1E	Carleton Ravens	2
8E	Nipissing Lakers	0
1E	Carleton Ravens	2
5W	Toronto Varsity Blues	0
4W	Windsor Lancers	2
4W	Windsor Lancers	2
1W	Western Ontario Mustangs	1
8W	Guelph Gryphons	1
1W	Western Ontario Mustangs	2
OUA West
6W	Brock Badgers	1
3W	Ryerson Rams	2
3W	Ryerson Rams	0
2W	Lakehead Thunderwolves	2
7W	York Lions	0
2W	Lakehead Thunderwolves	2

Division Finals (Best of 3); OUA Semi-Finals
3E	McGill Redmen	2
1E	Carleton Ravens	1
4W	Windsor Lancers	2
2W	Lakehead Thunderwolves	0

Queen's Cup (Single Game); OUA Championship
3E	McGill Redmen	2
4W	Windsor Lancers	3

Bronze Medal
2W	Lakehead Thunderwolves	4
1E	Carleton Ravens	7

=== Canada West playoffs ===
The Canada West playoffs were held from February 21 to March 8, 2014.

Quarter-finals (Best of 3)
3	Saskatchewan Huskies	1
6	UBC Thunderbirds	2
4	Manitoba Bisons	2
5	Mount Royal Cougars	0

Semi-finals (Best of 3)
1	Alberta Golden Bears	2
6	UBC Thunderbirds	0
2	Calgary Dinos	2
4	Manitoba Bisons	1

Canada West Championship (Best of 3)
1	Alberta Golden Bears	2
2	Calgary Dinos	0

== University Cup ==
The six teams to advance to the tournament are listed below. The wild-card team was selected from the OUA Conference as the AUS was provided the wild-card in 2013 and CW teams are ineligible as they are the host conference. To avoid having two CW teams in the same pool, Saskatchewan was swapped with Carleton.

Rank	Seed	Team	Qualification
1	1	Alberta Golden Bears	Canada West Champion
2	2	Acadia Axemen	AUS Champion
3	3	Windsor Lancers	OUA-West and Queen's Cup Champion
4	4	McGill Redmen	OUA-East and Queen's Cup Finalist
10	5	Saskatchewan Huskies	Host & Canada West Finalist
5	6	Carleton Ravens	Wild-Card – OUA Third Place

=== Pool A – Afternoon ===
Pool A games were played from March 20 to March 22, 2014.

Seed	Team	Qualified
1	Alberta Golden Bears	Canada West Champion
4	McGill Redmen	OUA-East Champion (Queen's Cup Finalist)
6	Carleton Ravens	Wild-card – OUA Third Place

Team	GP	W	L	GF	GA	DIF	PTS
Alberta Golden Bears	2	2	0	6	4	2	4
McGill Redmen	2	1	1	5	5	0	2
Carleton Ravens	2	0	2	4	6	−2	0

March 20, 2014; 1:00 PM	Alberta Golden Bears	3–2 (3–1, 0–0, 0–1)	Carleton Ravens	Credit Union Centre, Saskatoon; Attendance: 6,102 (40.2%)

Game reference

Kurtis Mucha (1–0)
Goalies
Francis Dupuis (0–1)
Referees:
Nathan Wieler
Todd Thomander
Linesmen:
Nick Bilko
Sean Dufour

J. Rowley (1) (B. Ferguson, L. Koper) – 1:29	1–0
T.J. Foster (1) (B. Ferguson) (PP) – 6:31	2–0
	2–1	14:40 – J. Pleckaitis (1) (T. Billingsley, M. McNamee) (PP)
T. Toomey (1) (D. Nichol, K. Reddick) – 16:49	3–1
	3–2	57:21 – D. Cross (1) (J. Pleckaitis) (PP)

10 min
Penalties
28 min
41
Shots
17

March 21, 2014; 1:00 PM	Carleton Ravens	2–3 (1–1, 0–2, 1–0)	McGill Redmen	Credit Union Centre, Saskatoon; Attendance: 8,304 (54.6%)

Game reference

Francis Dupuis (0–2)
Goalies
Jacob Gervais-Chouinard (1–0)
Referees:
Pascal St. Jacques
Derek Zalaski
Linesmen:
Nick Bilko
Kelsey Mahoney

	0–1	7:49 – J.P. Mathieu (1) (N. Prokop, B. Levesque)
Timothy Billingsley (2) (Unassisted) – 19:59	1–1
	1–2	22:05 – P. Deslisle-Houde (1) (R. McKiernan, C. McNicholl) (PP)
	1–3	27:27 – D. Rose (J.P. Mathieu, N. Prokop)
J. West (1) (T. Billingsley) – 43:42	2–3

10 min
Penalties
8 min
36
Shots
38

March 22, 2014; 2:00 PM; Sportsnet 360	Alberta Golden Bears	3–2 (2 OT) (0–0, 1–1, 1–1, 0–0, 1–0)	McGill Redmen	Credit Union Centre, Saskatoon; Attendance: 3,041 (20.0%)

Game reference

Luke Siemens (1–0)
Goalies
Jacob Gervais-Chouinard (1–1)
Referees:
Derek Zalaski
Scott Ferguson
Linesmen:
Nick Bilko
Mike Roberts

K. Reddick (1) (J. Hickmont, B. Ferguson) – 7:52	1–0
	1–1	35:35 – G. Langelier-Parent (1) (Unassisted)
	1–2	41:00 – J.P. Mathieu (2) (C. McNicholl) (PP)
B. Ferguson (1) (J. Crooks, K. Reddick) – 47:13	2–2
J. Lazo (1) (K. Reddick) – 96:22	3–2

20 min
Penalties
22 min
55
Shots
20

=== Pool B – Evening ===
Seed	Team	Qualified
2	Acadia Axemen	AUS Champion
3	Windsor Lancers	OUA-West and Queen's Cup Champion
5	Saskatchewan Huskies	Host

Team	GP	W	L	GF	GA	DIF	PTS
Saskatchewan Huskies	2	2	0	12	2	10	4
Windsor Lancers	2	1	1	4	11	−7	2
Acadia Axemen	2	0	2	4	7	−3	0

March 20, 2014; 7:00 PM	Acadia Axemen	2–4 (1–1, 1–1, 0–2)	Windsor Lancers	Credit Union Centre, Saskatoon; Attendance: 2,008 (13.2%)

Game reference

Evan Mosher (0–1)
Goalies
Parker Van Buskirk (1–0)
Referees:
Scott Ferguson
Derek Zalaski
Linesmen:
Mike Roberts
Ryan Lundquist

M. Cazzola (1) (L. Heelis) – 1:19	1–0
	1–1	16:52 – R. Cameron (1) (M. Doan, I. Quackenbush)
L. Heelis (1) (M. Cazzola, B. Thompson) – 21:43	2–1
	2–2	32:43 – D. Palmer (1) (S. Pommells, S. Posa) (PP)
	2–3	41:07 – K. Bradford (1) (S. Pommells, S. Posa) (PP)
	2–4	44:14 – M. Christou (1) (R. Cameron, B. Blondeel)

14 min
Penalties
12 min
27
Shots
28

March 21, 2014; 7:00 PM	Acadia Axemen	2–3 (1–2, 1–0, 0–1)	Saskatchewan Huskies	Credit Union Centre, Saskatoon; Attendance: 8,104 (53.3%)

Game reference

Evan Mosher (0–2)
Goalies
Ryan Holfeld (1–0)
Referees:
Nathan Wieler
Scott Ferguson
Linesmen:
Mike Roberts
Sean Dufour

L. Heelis (2) (B. Thompson, C. Owens) (PP) – 3:40	1–0
	1–1	5:29 – C. Smuk (1) (A. Bailey)
	1–2	9:50 – B. Bosch (1) (D. Hulak) (PP)
L. Jenner (1) (L. Heelis, B. Thompson) – 35:58	2–2
	2–3	57:58 – D. Hulak (1) (B. Bosch)

28 min
Penalties
10 min
28
Shots
30

March 22, 2014; 7:00 PM; Sportsnet 360	Windsor Lancers	0–9 (0–2, 0–4, 0–3)	Saskatchewan Huskies	Credit Union Centre, Saskatoon; Attendance: 7,241 (47.7%)

Game reference

Parker Van Buskirk (1–1)
Goalies
Ryan Holfeld (2–0)
Referees:
Pascal St. Jacques
Todd Thomander
Linesmen:
Ryan Lundquist
Kelsey Mahoney

0–1	8:42 – K. McFaull (1)(J. Ross, D. Hulak)
0–2	10:49 – D. Hulak (2) (C. McCallum, C. Cox) (PP)
0–3	24:41 – D. Hulak (3) (J. Ross, B. Bosch)
0–4	26:07 – A. Bailey (1) (C. McCallum)
0–5	32:21 – C. McCallum (1) (J. Ross, M. Delahey)
0–6	37:58 – J. Lawrence (1) (J. Ross)
0–7	49:26 – R. McDonald (1) (Unassisted)
0–8	53:03 – – J. Roach (1) (C. Smuk)
0–9	58:20 – C. Smuk (2) (Z. Stebner, J. Roach) (PP)

18 min
Penalties
26 min
19
Shots
34

== Championship final ==
Bench assignments for the championship final (home/visitor) is based on each advancing team's record and stats from their 2-game pool games, not their tournament seed. Saskatchewan is the home team with a 2–0 record (4pts) and a GF/GA ratio of 12/2 = 6.0 versus Alberta with a 2–0 record (4pts) and a GF/GA ratio of 6/4 = 1.5.

March 23, 2014; 1:30 PM; Rogers Sportsnet	#1 Alberta Golden Bears	3–1 (0–0, 2–1, 1–0)	#5 Saskatchewan Huskies	Credit Union Centre, Saskatoon; Attendance: 6,289 (41.4%)

Game reference

Kurtis Mucha (2–0)
Goalies
Ryan Holfeld (2–1)
Referees:
Nathan Wieler
Pascal St. Jacques
Linesmen:
Nick Bilko
Ryan Lundquist

J. Hickmont (1) (B. Ferguson, J. Crooks) – 24:02	1–0
L. Koper (1) (J. Dobrowolski) (SH) – 45:19	2–0
	2–1	36:38 – D. Hulak (4) (J. Roach, B. Bosch)
L. Koper (2) (T. Toomey) – 54:12	3–1

19 min
Penalties
22 min
36
Shots
21

== Tournament All-Stars ==
Derek Hulak, from the Saskatchewan Huskies, was selected as the Major W.J. 'Danny' McLeod Award for CIS University Cup MVP. Hulak led all players in goals (4) and points (6) in the tournament. He is the first MVP selection from the Championship losing team since Yvan Busque (Moncton) was selected in 2007.

Joining Hulak on the tournament all-star team were:

- Forward: Kruise Reddick (Alberta Golden Bears)
- Forward: Brett Ferguson (Alberta Golden Bears)
- Defenseman: Jesse Craig (Alberta Golden Bears)
- Defenseman: Kendall McFaull (Saskatchewan Huskies)
- Goalie: Jacob Gervais-Chouinard (McGill Redmen)
