= Mark Howell (ice hockey) =

Canadian ice hockey coach

- Born: November 23, 1970 (age 54); Red Deer, Alberta, Canada
- Position: Right wing
- Played for: Seattle Thunderbirds; Medicine Hat Tigers; New Westminster Royals; Asheville Smoke
- Playing career: 1986–1999

Mark Howell (born November 23, 1970) is a Canadian ice hockey coach and former player working as the head coach of the University of Calgary's Calgary Dinos. Howell was named the CIS Coach of the Year for the 2010–11 season. Between 1986 and 1999, Howell played for the Seattle Thunderbirds, Medicine Hat Tigers, New Westminster Royals, and Asheville Smoke.
