= Rutherford Arena =

Hockey rink

- Interactive map of Rutherford Arena
- Former names: The Rink
- Location: University of Saskatchewan, Saskatoon, Saskatchewan; Canada
- Coordinates: 52.13158°N 106.62839°W
- Capacity: Ice hockey: 700

Construction
- Opened: 1929
- Renovated: 1980 and 1986
- Closed: 2018
- Demolished: 2022
- Cost: C$47,000
- Architect: G.J.K. Verbeke

Tenant
- Saskatchewan Huskies

The University of Saskatchewan Rutherford Arena is a hockey rink constructed in 1929, with its official opening in January, 1930. The rink was used by the Saskatchewan Huskies hockey teams until 2018. It holds up to 700 people.

It was announced on October 13, 2016 that a new arena for the Huskies would be constructed on campus, following a donation of $12.25 million by Merlis Belsher. That arena, Merlis Belsher Place, officially opened in 2018.

Rutherford Arena was demolished in 2022.

== See also ==
- University of Saskatchewan Kinesiology
- University of Saskatchewan
