= 2015 CIS University Cup =

Tournament details
- Venue(s): Scotiabank Centre, Halifax, Nova Scotia
- Dates: March 12–15, 2015
- Teams: 8

Final positions
- Champions: Alberta Golden Bears (15th title)
- Runners-up: New Brunswick Varsity Reds
- Third place: Guelph Gryphons
- Fourth place: Quebec–Trois-Rivières Patriotes

Tournament statistics
- Games played: 8
- Attendance: 30,703 (3,838 per game)

Awards
- MVP: Kruise Reddick (Alberta)

The 2015 CIS Men's University Cup Hockey Tournament (53rd Annual) was held March 20–23, 2014. It was the first of two consecutive CIS Championships to be held at the Scotiabank Centre in Halifax jointly hosted by the St. Francis Xavier University and Saint Mary's University. Each school was a designated 'host' for one of the events; St. Francis Xavier was the 2015 host while Saint Mary's was the host in the second year (2016).

The defending champions were the Alberta Golden Bears, which advanced to the tournament as the Canada West Champions and #1 seed.

== New tournament format ==
This two-year bid included a format change that saw eight teams compete and the re-introduction of the bronze medal game. Previous tournaments, going back to 1998 (17 seasons), were a 6-team 2-pool format (3 teams per pool) where one team from each pool would advance to the championship final (in some seasons, the runner-up in each pool would play for Bronze). Instead of a pool format, a tradition single elimination 8-team bracket was chosen and the teams seeded 1–8. The tournament length was the same (4 days) with two games on each day (the same half of the bracket per day; 1–8 and 4–5 versus 2–7 and 3–6 with Thursday's winners playing Saturday afternoon and Friday's winners playing Saturday night). The losers of Saturday's semi-finals play in the bronze medal game held prior to the championship final on Sunday.

USPORTS announced they would reevaluated the format after the two-year run in Halifax for subsequent years.

=== Tournament seeding ===
In the previous six-team two-pool format, the conference champions were seeded 1-3 and the remaining three teams were shuffled between the pools based on the CIS balancing criteria to reduce intra-conference match-ups (e.g., when there were only two teams from one conference, they were placed in separate pools, and if a conflict arose based on 1–4–6 vs 2–3–5 placement, the lower seeded team was swapped with a lower seeded team in the other pool to maintain the integrity of the draw).

In the new format, teams were seeded based on the last Top 10 Poll (the Saturday/Sunday prior to the tournament). The three conference champions were seeded one through three, with the order based on their rank. The OUA Runner-up (loser of the Queen's Cup) was seeded 4th, regardless of their rank. The remaining four teams are seeded 5-to-8 based on their rank. Teams in the bottom half could be shuffled by two spots, up or down, to reduce intra-conference match-ups in the first round (quarterfinals) while maintaining the integrity of the draw (e.g., if the AUS Champion was seed #1 and the host is an AUS team seeded #8, the AUS host would be swapped with #7 to avoid an AUS-vs-AUS first round match). The Tournament Committee does not have to swap teams to avoid intra-conference matchups in the 1st round, but it is expected and they are afforded the opportunity. An example of not swapping – in 2019, tournament host Lethbridge, chose to remain seed #8 and play #1 Alberta in their first game of the tournament rather than be seed #7 and play #2 UNB.

=== Team selection ===
The 8 participating teams and their selection criteria are listed below. Each conference would qualified two teams – champion and runner-up. The OUA Conference had an additional selection (3rd-place finisher) and the final spot was the designated host. Where the host has qualified as one of the other 7 spots, the 'host' would be replaced with another team from that conference.

Conf.	Criteria
AUS	Champion
AUS	Finalist
Canada West	Champion
Canada West	Finalist
OUA-East	Champion
OUA-West	Champion
OUA	3rd Place
	Host

== Road to the Cup ==
=== AUS playoffs ===
Quarter-finals (Best of 3)
4	St. Francis Xavier X-Men	2
5	UPEI Panthers	0
3	Saint Mary's Huskies	2
6	Moncton Aigles Bleu	1

Semi-finals (Best of 5)
1	UNB Varsity Reds	3
4	St. Francis Xavier X-Men	2
2	Acadia Axemen	3
3	Saint Mary's Huskies	2

AUS Championship (Best of 5)
1	UNB Varsity Reds	2
2	Acadia Axemen	0

=== OUA playoffs ===
Division Quarter-finals (Best of 3); OUA Sweet 16	Division Semi-finals (Best of 3); OUA Quarter-Finals
1E	McGill Redmen	2
8E	Concordia Stingers	1
1E	McGill Redmen	2
5E	Queen's Golden Gaels	0
4E	Laurentian Voyageurs	1
5E	Queen's Golden Gaels	2
OUA East
2E	Carleton Ravens	2
7E	UOIT Ridgebacks	0
2E	Carleton Ravens	0
3E	UQTR Patriots	2
3E	UQTR Patriotes	2
6E	Nipissing Lakers	0
1W	Windsor Lancers	2
8W	Brock Badgers	1
1W	Windsor Lancers	2
7W	Lakehead Thunderwolves	0
2W	Western Ontario Mustangs	0
7W	Lakehead Thunderwolves	2
OUA West
4W	Ryerson Rams	0
5W	Toronto Varsity Blues	2
5W	Toronto Varsity Blues	0
6W	Guelph Gryphons	2
3W	Waterloo Warriors	0
6W	Guelph Gryphons	2

Division Finals (Best of 3); OUA Semi-Finals
1E	McGill Redmen	0
3E	UQTR Patriots	2
1W	Windsor Lancers	0
6W	Guelph Gryphons	2

Queen's Cup (Single Game); OUA Championship
3E	UQTR Patriots	0
6W	Guelph Gryphons	4

Bronze Medal
1E	McGill Redmen	1
1W	Windsor Lancers	2

=== Canada West playoffs ===
Quarter-finals (Best of 3)
4	UBC Thunderbirds	2
5	Manitoba Bisons	1
3	Mount Royal Cougars	2
6	Saskatchewan Huskies	1

Semi-finals (Best of 3)
1	Alberta Golden Bears	2
4	UBC Thunderbirds	0
2	Calgary Dinos	2
3	Mount Royal Cougars	1

Canada West Championship (Best of 3)
1	Alberta Golden Bears	2
2	Calgary Dinos	0

== University Cup tournament ==
=== Participating teams ===
The eight teams to advance to the tournament are listed below.

Rank	Seed	Team	Qualification
1	1	Alberta Golden Bears	Canada West Champion
2	2	UNB Varsity Reds	AUS Champion
3	3	Guelph Gryphons	OUA-West and Queen's Cup Champion
4	4	UQTR Patriotes	OUA-East Champion (Queen's Cup Finalist)
5	5	Acadia Axemen	AUS Finalist
6	6	Calgary Dinos	Canada West Finalist
7	7	Windsor Lancers	OUA Third Place
8	8	St. Francis Xavier X-Men	Host

=== Tournament format ===
The tournament was a traditional 8 team single elimination ladder with a bronze medal game between the two semi-final losers. Games that were tied after regulation played a 10-minute overtime period following the third period. If there was no score after the first overtime, the ice was cleaned and they play 20 minute periods (with ice cleaned between periods) until there was a winner.

The higher seed was the 'home' team for each game (the home team had to wear their 'white' jerseys and got the last change during stoppages of play).

Quarter-finals (Single Game)
3	Guelph Gryphons	3
6	Calgary Dinos	1
Thursday
2	UNB Varsity Reds	6
7	Windsor Lancers	2
4	UQTR Patriotes	6 OT1
5	Acadia Axemen	5
Friday
1	Alberta Golden Bears	5
8	St. Francis Xavier X-Men	1

Semi-finals (Single Game)
3	Guelph Gryphons	2
2	UNB Varsity Reds	5
4	UQTR Patriotes	1
1	Alberta Golden Bears	5

Championship final (Single Game)
2	UNB Varsity Reds	3
1	Alberta Golden Bears	6

Bronze Medal (Single Game)
3	Guelph Gryphons	3 OT1
4	UQTR Patriotes	2

=== Overtime ===
Games that ended in a regulation tie were resolved solely on 5-on-5 overtime (5 skaters and a goalie for each side) until one team scored. The first overtime period was 10 minutes and started after a three-minute rest. Following this period, the ice was resurfaced and subsequent 20 minute periods were played.

== Bronze game ==
March 15, 2015; 14:00 (local)	Guelph Gryphons #3	3–2 OT1 (1–1, 0–1, 1–0, 1–0)	UQTR Patriotes #4	Scotiabank Centre, Halifax; Attendance: 2,175 (20.7%)

Game reference

Andrew D'Agostini (1–1)
Goalies
Guillaume Nadeau (1–1)
Referees:
Jonathan Langille
Mario Maillet
Linesmen:
Josh DeYoung
Nicolas Melanson

	0–1	9:40 – M. Tanguay-Ther (1) (G. Belanger, V. Marcoux)
S. Simmonds (1) – 10:01	1–1
	1–2	25:28 – G. Asselin (1) (A. Verret, J. Rajotte)
D. Broussard (1) (N. Trecapelli, C. Amestoy) – 41:32	2–2
K. Neuber (1) (D. Broussard – 65:31	3–2

26 min
Penalties
22 min
30
Shots
23

Game MVPs: Kyle Neuber – (GPH) & Guillaume Asselin (UQTR)

== Championship final ==
March 15, 2015; 18:30 (local)	Alberta Golden Bears #1	6–3 (2–0, 1–1, 3–2)	UNB Varsity Reds #2	Scotiabank Centre, Halifax; Attendance: 4,404 (41.9%)

Game reference

Kurtis Mucha (2–0)
Goalies
David Shantz (2–0)
Referees:
TJ Foster
Jonathan Alarie
Linesmen:
John MacDonnell
Mike MacDonnell

S. Legault (1) (Jamie Crooks, B. Ferguson) – 2:09	1–0
J. Hickmott (1) (T.J. Foster (PP) – 10:00	2–0
	2–1	23:04 – D. Willick (1) (M. Boudens)
J. Lazo (1) (Levko Koper – 39:57	3–1
	3–2	47:55 – P. Maillet (1) (J. Murray, D. Fraser)
K. Reddick (1) (T. Carr, J. Rowley – 51:12	4–2
	4–3	55:50 – A. Robertson (1) (P. Maillet)
Levko Koper (1) (B. Ferguson (SH) – 57:24	5–3
J. Rowley (1)(SH) (EN) – 58:11	6–3

14 min
Penalties
10 min
24
Shots
9

Game MVPs: Levko Koper – (ALB) & Dylan Willick (UNB)

== Record 15th Title ==
Alberta's victory was their 15th, the most by any team to date, and five more than University of Toronto Varsity Blues. It also marked the 5th time they had defended a championship title (1979, 1980, 2000, 2006, and 2015). The University of Toronto Blues held the record for title defenses at the time, with 6.

== Tournament All-Stars ==
Kruise Reddick, from the Alberta Golden Bears, was selected as the Major W.J. 'Danny' McLeod Award for CIS University Cup MVP. Reddick had 3 goals (1 in each game) and 1 assist for 4 points and a +3 rating in the tournament.

Joining Reddick on the tournament All-Star team were:

- Forward: Jordan Hickmott (Alberta Golden Bears)
- Forward: Cam Braes (UNB Varsity Reds)
- Defenseman: Jesse Craig (Alberta Golden Bears)
- Defenseman: Jordan Murray (UNB Varsity Reds)
- Goalie: Andrew D'Agostini (Guelph Gryphons)
