= OSLC men's ice hockey tournament =

Ottawa–St. Lawrence Conference men's ice hockey tournament
- Conference hockey championship
- Sport: Ice hockey
- Conference: Ottawa–St. Lawrence Conference
- Format: Single-elimination
- Played: 1950–1971

The Ottawa–St. Lawrence Conference ice hockey tournament was an annual conference championship held between member teams.

== History ==
After World War II, there was a push to expand ice hockey among the smaller colleges in Canada. The initial product was the Senior Intercollegiate League, however, that conference lasted for only one season. Eventually, several schools in Ontario and Quebec banded together to form the Ottawa–St. Lawrence Conference. Initially, the league was considered an intermediate conference (roughly equivalent to Division II in the U.S.) and included the second team from McGill. By the early 1960s, however, the conference had grown in strength and prestige and was included in the inaugural CIAU national tournament. In 1971, the three conferences in Ontario and Quebec were realigned according to provincial lines and the OSLC ceased to exist.

Initially, the conference did not have a formal playoff structure to determine the league champion. The OSLC would only hold a playoff if there was a tie for the league champions at the end of the regular season. No playoffs were held in the first 12 years of conference play as no tie ever occurred. In 1962, the conference formalized a postseason for the first time, pitting the top two teams in a single-elimination game for the championship. The tournament was expanded to four teams the following season and remained in place for the duration of the conference.

== Tournaments ==
=== 1950 ===
Seed	School	Standings	Seed	School	Standings
1	Loyola	?	?	Dawson	?
3	Macdonald	5–4–0	?	McGill II	?
?	Bishop's	?	?	Royal Military College	?
?	Carleton	?	?	Sir George Williams	?

no playoffs
Note: records incomplete.

=== 1951 ===
Seed	School	Standings	Seed	School	Standings
1	Loyola	8–0–1	5	Sir George Williams	2–6–1
2	McGill II	7–1–2	6	Carleton	1–5–0
3	Royal Military College	4–2–0	7	Macdonald	1–7–0
4	Bishop's	2–4–0			

no playoffs

=== 1952 ===
Seed	School	Standings
1	Loyola	7–1–0
2	Queen's	6–1–1
3	Bishop's	3–4–0
4	Royal Military College	2–4–1
5	McGill II	0–8–0

no playoffs

=== 1953 ===
Seed	School	Standings	Seed	School	Standings
1	Loyola	6–0–0	5	Sir George Williams	2–4–0
2	McGill II	4–1–0	T–6	Carleton	0–5–1
3	Queen's	3–1–1	T–6	Bishop's	0–5–1
4	Royal Military College	3–2–1			

no playoffs

=== 1954 ===
Seed	School	Standings	Seed	School	Standings
1	Loyola	7–0–0	5	Carleton	3–3–0
2	Queen's	5–1–1	T–6	Bishop's	1–5–0
3	Royal Military College	4–2–1	T–6	McGill II	1–4–0
4	Sir George Williams	6–3–3	8	Royal Military College Saint-Jean	0–6–0

no playoffs

=== 1955 ===
Seed	School	Standings	Seed	School	Standings
1	Royal Military College Saint-Jean	5–0–0	4	Bishop's	1–2–0
2	Loyola	4–1–0	5	Carleton	1–4–0
3	Royal Military College	2–2–0	6	Sir George Williams	0–4–0

no playoffs

=== 1956 ===
Seed	School	Standings
1	Loyola	7–1–0
2	Sir George Williams	5–2–0
3	Royal Military College Saint-Jean	4–4–0
4	Royal Military College	2–4–1
5	Bishop's	0–7–1

no playoffs
Note: The result of the game between Sir George Williams and Royal Military College is missing.

=== 1957 ===
Seed	School	Standings
1	Loyola	7–1–0
?	Bishop's	?
?	Royal Military College	?
?	Royal Military College Saint-Jean	?
?	Sir George Williams	?

no playoffs
Note: Records incomplete.

=== 1958 ===
Seed	School	Standings	Seed	School	Standings
1	Loyola	?	?	Royal Military College	?
?	Bishop's	?	?	Royal Military College Saint-Jean	?
?	Macdonald	?	?	Sir George Williams	?

no playoffs
Note: Records incomplete.

=== 1959 ===
Seed	School	Standings	Seed	School	Standings
1	Loyola	?	?	Royal Military College	?
?	Bishop's	?	?	Royal Military College Saint-Jean	?
?	Macdonald	?	?	Sir George Williams	?

no playoffs
Note: Records incomplete.

=== 1960 ===
Seed	School	Standings	Seed	School	Standings
1	Loyola	8–1–1	4	Royal Military College Saint-Jean	4–4–1
2	Sir George Williams	8–2–0	5	Bishop's	2–7–0
3	Macdonald	6–4–0	6	Royal Military College	0–10–0

no playoffs

=== 1961 ===
Seed	School	Standings	Seed	School	Standings
1	Ottawa	?	?	Royal Military College Saint-Jean	?
?	Sir George Williams	?	?	Bishop's	?
?	Loyola	?	?	Royal Military College	?
?	Macdonald	?			

no playoffs
Note: Records incomplete.

=== 1962 ===
Seed	School	Standings	Seed	School	Standings
1	Ottawa	9–1–0	T–5	Macdonald	3–5–1
2	Sir George Williams	8–1–1	T–5	Loyola	3–6–1
3	Carleton	6–3–1	T–7	Royal Military College Saint-Jean	2–7–0
4	Bishop's	3–5–2	T–7	Royal Military College	2–8–0

Championship
1	Ottawa	2
2	Sir George Williams	4

=== 1963 ===
Seed	School	Standings	Seed	School	Standings
1	Ottawa	12–2–0	5	Loyola	3–5–1
T–2	Sherbrooke	11–3–0	6	Macdonald	4–9–1
T–2	Royal Military College	11–3–0	7	Carleton	3–9–2
4	Sir George Williams	5–8–1	8	Bishop's	3–11–0

Semifinals
1	Ottawa	5
4	Sir George Williams	3
2	Sherbrooke	5
3	Royal Military College	4

Championship
1	Ottawa	5
2	Sherbrooke	6

=== 1964 ===
Seed	School	Standings	Seed	School	Standings
T–1	Royal Military College	8–2–4	5	Carleton	6–5–3
T–1	Ottawa	10–4–0	6	Sherbrooke	5–9–0
3	Sir George Williams	8–4–2	7	Bishop's	4–9–1
4	Loyola	8–5–1	8	Macdonald	1–12–1

Semifinals
1	Royal Military College	6
4	Loyola	4
2	Ottawa	3
3	Sir George Williams	4

Championship
1	Royal Military College	2
3	Sir George Williams	5

=== 1965 ===
Seed	School	Standings	Seed	School	Standings
1	Ottawa	12–1–1	5	Loyola	6–8–0
2	Sir George Williams	11–3–0	6	Bishop's	3–10–1
3	Royal Military College	9–4–1	T–7	Sherbrooke	3–11–0
4	Carleton	7–6–1	T–7	Macdonald	3–11–0

Note: Royal Military College was unable to participate in the tournament due to a scheduling conflict.

Semifinals
1	Ottawa	6
4	Loyola	7
2	Sir George Williams	6
3	Carleton	5

Championship
4	Loyola	5
2	Sir George Williams	6
Third place
1	Ottawa	7
3	Carleton	3

=== 1966 ===
Seed	School	Standings	Seed	School	Standings
1	Sir George Williams	14–1–1	6	Carleton	6–9–1
2	Loyola	12–3–1	7	Bishop's	5–10–1
3	Ottawa	11–4–1	8	Macdonald	3–12–1
4	Royal Military College	8–6–2	9	Sherbrooke	2–14–0
5	Royal Military College Saint-Jean	7–9–0			

Semifinals
1	Sir George Williams	5
4	Royal Military College	4
2	Loyola	7
3	Ottawa	6

Championship
1	Sir George Williams	5
2	Loyola	4

=== 1967 ===
Seed	School	Standings	Seed	School	Standings
1	Sir George Williams	16–2–0	6	Sherbrooke	7–11–0
2	Loyola	14–3–1	7	Carleton	5–11–2
3	Bishop's	12–6–0	8	Macdonald	5–12–1
4	Royal Military College	11–6–1	9	St. Patrick's	4–13–1
5	Royal Military College Saint-Jean	8–7–3	10	Ottawa	3–14–1

Semifinals
1	Sir George Williams	8
4	Royal Military College	5
2	Loyola	7
3	Bishop's	2

Championship
1	Sir George Williams	5
2	Loyola	4

=== 1968 ===
Seed	School	Standings	Seed	School	Standings
1	Loyola	15–1–0	6	Royal Military College	5–9–2
2	Sherbrooke	11–4–1	T–7	Royal Military College Saint-Jean	4–11–1
3	Sir George Williams	9–5–2	T–7	Ottawa	4–11–1
4	Bishop's	9–6–1	9	Macdonald	3–13–0
5	Carleton	8–8–0			

Semifinals
1	Loyola	7
4	Bishop's	1
2	Sherbrooke	5
3	Sir George Williams	7

Championship
1	Loyola	6
3	Sir George Williams	2

=== 1969 ===
Seed	School	Standings	Seed	School	Standings
1	Loyola	16–1–1	5	Macdonald	8–10–0
T–2	Sherbrooke	10–7–1	6	Royal Military College	6–12–0
T–2	Bishop's	10–7–1	7	Royal Military College Saint-Jean	2–16–0
4	Sir George Williams	9–8–1			

Semifinals
1	Loyola	2
4	Sir George Williams	4
2	Sherbrooke	4
3	Bishop's	5

Championship
4	Sir George Williams	3
3	Bishop's	2

=== 1970 ===
Seed	School	Standings	Seed	School	Standings
1	Loyola	13–0–1	5	Royal Military College	6–7–1
2	Sherbrooke	11–1–2	6	Quebec–Trois-Rivières	4–8–2
3	Sir George Williams	9–5–0	7	Macdonald	2–12–0
4	Bishop's	8–6–0	8	Royal Military College Saint-Jean	0–14–0

Semifinals
1	Loyola	8
4	Bishop's	2
2	Sherbrooke	5
3	Sir George Williams	2

Championship
1	Loyola	2
2	Sherbrooke	1

=== 1971 ===
Seed	School	Standings	Seed	School	Standings
1	Loyola	15–2–1	5	Royal Military College	8–9–1
2	Quebec–Trois-Rivières	12–5–1	6	Sir George Williams	5–13–0
3	Bishop's	10–6–2	7	Macdonald	0–18–0
4	Sherbrooke	10–7–1			

Semifinals
1	Loyola	10
4	Sherbrooke	3
2	Quebec–Trois-Rivières	5
3	Bishop's	4

Championship
1	Loyola	3
2	Quebec–Trois-Rivières	1

== Championships ==
School	Championships
Loyola	13
Sir George Williams	6
Ottawa	1
Royal Military College Saint-Jean	1
Sherbrooke	1

== See also ==
- OUAA men's ice hockey tournament
- QUAA men's ice hockey tournament
- OUA men's ice hockey tournament
