= 1960–61 Middlebury Panthers men's ice hockey season =

- Conference: Independent
- Home ice: War Memorial Field House

Record
- Overall: 19–2–0
- Home: 9–0–0
- Road: 10–2–0

Coaches and captains
- Head coach: Duke Nelson
- Captain: Phil Latreille

The 1960–61 Middlebury Panthers men's ice hockey season was the 36th season of play for the program. The Panthers represented Middlebury College and were coached by Duke Nelson, in his 19th season. During the season, Phil Latreille set many NCAA records including goals in a season (80), career goals (250), and career points (346) that still stand as of 2024.

== Season ==
=== Preseason ===
The 1960–61 Panthers from Middlebury was set to start the season off strong. Phil Latreille, the new team captain, had set the record for goals in the previous two seasons by scoring 57 as a sophomore and then 77 as a junior. His performances convinced the local radio station, WRMC, to take the extraordinary measure of broadcasting every Middlebury hockey game, both home and away. This included the station's first international events when the Panthers traveled to Canada. Even with Latreille's massive scoring totals, the team had been held back by their lack of defensive acumen over the past two seasons. However, since most of the players from the previous season were returning, Coach Nelson's boys would have a leg-up in experience and familiarity. In that vein, the second line for the Panthers was made up entirely by the Fryberger brothers. The Fryberger brothers included twins, Bob and Jerry, who were in their final season. The twins would play the wings around Sophomore Dates Fryberger, who appeared to be the best of the bunch.

=== Fast start ===
The season began on November 19 with Latreille once again in command of the Panther offense. After assisting on the opening goal, Phil scored the eventual game-winner in the second. Both Latreille and Dates Fryberger had several chances for goals in the second half of the match but several of their shots hit the post and bounced away. Despite the win, Latreille was critical of the team's performance, particularly their passing, but he believed that the team would soon round into form. True enough, after a week and a half of practice, Middlebury hammered Saint-Jean in the return game. From almost the drop of the puck, the panthers stalked the Remparts' net with the top two lines dealing most of the damage. Even with the home team scoring first, Middlebury shot out to a huge lead in the opening period with five goals to their credit, two each from Latreille and Dates Fryberger. Latreille added two more in the second and then a goal and an assist in the third. Though the latter part of the match was marred by penalties, Middlebury was able to stop any real comeback attempt by the Canadians which was a good sign for their defensive efforts. The Panthers looked to be sailing to an easy win in the next game when they opened with three quick goals against Princeton. While the Tigers provided a bit of a fight in the second, Middlebury scored three more in the second to take a commanding 6–2 lead midway through the game. However, just before the end of the period, the match was upended by a controversial ruling by the referee. Latreille hit one of the Princeton players in the face with his stick on a follow-through after a shot. While also being hooked on the play, Latreille was the only one penalized and received a 5-minute major. When coach Nelson tried to argue against the call, the referee changed his ruling and disqualified Latreille for the remainder of the match. Middlebury was incensed by the call while Princeton sought to capitalize on their opportunity. After cutting the lead down to just 2 at the start of the third, Middlebury appeared to have calmed down and played a solid defensive game for 17 minutes. With time winding down, Princeton scored two goals, the last coming with just 9 seconds left on the clock, to force overtime. Once the extra period began, Princeton took two penalties in rapid succession and Jerry Fryberger was able to wrap the puck around the cage for a winning tally.

After the close call, the Panthers were able to squeeze in a couple of games before the winter break. Home against Colgate, many students delayed their holidays in order to get a glimpse of Latreille and the Panthers and were rewarded with another brilliant performance by the captain. After assisting on the opening goal, Phil scored his first of the night near the middle of the second period. After a 4-on-4 marker from Dates, Latreille lasered the puck into the top corner of the net. A second goal from the younger Fryberger ended the second with the score 5–0. The third was a rather muted period that allowed Gately to post the first shutout for Middlebury in about three years. Two days later the team faced their first big test of the season when they were at Clarkson. The Panthers had won just once in the previous eighteen meetings dating back to 1927 and the Knights were eager to build upon their 9–6 victory from a year earlier. Calrkson was quick off the mark and scored first but Middlebury quickly rose to the challenge. Latreille assisted on Ed Germond's tying goal and then scored to give the Panthers a lead after one. The home team got the only goal in the second, thanks in large part to a number of huge saves by Gately. Unfortunately, past was prologue and Clarkson's third goal proved to be the final marker in the match, handing Middlebury its first loss of the campaign.

=== Offensive juggernaut ===
The team then had several weeks to rest and prepare themselves for a return to action against Hamilton. The memory of their loss to Clarkson seemed to spur the team against the rebuilding Continentals and they took no mercy on the Blue and Buff. After Dates Fryberger kicked things off, Latreille recorded a hat-trick and an assist to finish out the first period. The captain added two more in the second while the Fryberger line netted a pair on the third. The Panthers kept rolling in the next game when they flattened American International 16–0 in one of the more comical games in program history. The entire team seemed to score at will with captain Latreille accounting for half of their goal total. AIC managed to score more goals on themselves than they did on Middlebury when one of the Yellow Jacket defensemen hit his goaltender with a clearing attempt and caused the puck to rebound into the net. Gately and Constanzo shared the shutout. Latreille ended the weekend with 31 points and 24 goals in just 7 games.

The Fryberger line got the ball rolling against Army with two goals in the first period. Latreille nabbed a hat-trick in the second while Jerry Fryberger finished things off to give the team a 6–2 edge after two. The third saw a barrage of five more goals from the Panthers that came at such a quick pace that the account of the game couldn't be sure whether or nor Latreille ended up with five or six goals. The following night, the team met Yale and were in for another dogfight with an ivy league school. After falling behind thanks to two quick Eli tallies, Dates got the Panthers on the board but Yale was able to get the goal back just before the end of the first. A second from Fryberger at the start of the second was equaled by a short-handed marker but Dates was able to finish off his hat-trick thanks to a pass from Latreille, leaving Middlebury just a goal behind as the third period began. Yale got their 2-goal lead back during a Latreille penalty but the captain soon made up for the infraction when he scored from in tight. After Latreille had been moved onto a line with Dates and Bobby Fryberger, Dates notched his fourth goal of the night to tie the score. With less than 2 minutes to play, Yale regained the lead but it lasted for just 19 seconds before Latreille evened the count with his second of the game. Overtime had barely begun when Dates snapped his fifth goal of the game, the third on a pass from Latreille, much to the chagrin of the home crowd.

In the team's final weekend before the exam break, Middlebury got off to a rock start against Dartmouth and found themselves down by 2 after one. Once again, Latreille sparked the offense in the second, scoring four consecutive goals to completely change the complexion of the game. Germond and Hultgren join in with markers at the start of the third but the Indians replied with two of their own. The teams spent the final 10 minutes trying to outscore one another and combined for 17 goals on the evening. Fortunately, Middlebury had plenty left in the tank and ended up with the lion's share of goals. A few days later, the team was looking forward to a show-down between two All-Americans when Northeastern arrived in town. Unfortunately, just 6 minutes into the game, Art Chisholm crashed face-first into the end boards. He received a deep gash across his upper lip that took several stitches to close and was out for the remainder of the game. Without their star, Northeastern was faced with a daunting task but they nonetheless prevented Phil Latreille from scoring a goal for the first time in 38 games. Fortunately for the Panthers, the rest of the team was able to pot 6 goals in the net and finish out the first half of their schedule with another win.

=== Continued success ===
Middlebury returned after the break with a trip to Quebec. Macdonald was the next team to fall victim to the Panthers. With Constanzo starting in goal, the two teams fought to a mostly even draw through two periods. Latreille and Jerry Fryberger each had two to give Middlbury a 1-goal lead after 40 minutes. The third period, however, saw Latreille score three consecutive goals to put the game out of reach while Bob Fryberger's second ended the scoring. The next night saw the team take on an overmatch squad from Bishop's but the Gaiters tried to make things interesting. The home side got the only goal in the first despite being widely outshot. Middlebury finally found a weakness in the opposing netminder when they got markers from Bob, Dates and Phil to take a 3–2 lead into the third period. The third saw Latreille take over with three more goals to double up the home side 6–3.

Back home the following week, Middlebury steamrolled Norwich, tying their season high with 16 goals on the night. The game was close for the first 20 minutes as Middlebury again started slow but a 6-goal second period broke the game open. The Panthers added 7 more in the third as the Cadets were completely unequipped to deal with such a high-powered offense. The next night saw several former Panthers return to the ice in the form of the St. Nicholas Hockey Club. After a scoreless first period, Middlebury scored three goals in rapid succession in the middle of the second. Though Latreille was held without a goal for the second time on the season, he did finish with a pair of assists.

As the team was preparing for a match with former conference-rival Rensselaer, they kicked off the weekend with a trip south to face Amherst. The Lord Jeffs were in the middle of a terrible season and Middlebury continued their torment. The Panthers scored 7 seconds into the game and never let the Sabrina's off the mat. Latreille finished with another 8-point night and reached six goals for the fourth time that season. The next night the team was looking to prove their mettle against RPI. The team was uncharacteristically taciturn as they prepared for the game, knowing that this would be their last big game for the remainder of the season. The home team was by far the better of the two for the first 20 minutes, besieging the Panther cage for nearly the entire first period. Gately was magnificent in the net, keeping his team in the match by allowing just one score. As they were want to, Middlebury awoke for the second period and got goals from Bobby Fryberger and Latreille to take a lead. RPI swiftly tied the match but Middlebury got bad news afterwards when Frank Coy reinjured his knee and was lost for the remainder of the period. Without one of their top defenders, Middlebury surrenedered another goal to the Engineers before Keith Dollar, their other starting blueliner, took a puck to the face. With a badly broken nose, Dollar was lost for the rest of the game. While Gately would have to be on the top of his game if the Panthers wanted to have a chance, the team would also need one of their reserve defensemen to step up to the plate. After Latreille tied the game 12 seconds into the period, "Wicker" Weekes delivered in relief, helping to stem the tide of the RPI attack and keep his team in the match. A second goal from Phil gave Middlebury its second lead as well as the belief that could pull out a victory. Unfortunately, the home team continued to press and scored twice more to regain their edge. The Panthers fought valiantly in the final two minutes but they were unable to find a fifth goal and were handed their second loss of the year.

=== Ending on a high note ===
For the final two weeks of the season, Middlebury would see three rematches as they sought to finish off what they hoped would be the best season in program history. Norwich was looking for a better fate than they had in the first game but Bobby Fryberger started the scoring just 3 minutes into the match. Norwich stiffened defensively afterwards, keeping Middlebury away from their cage for the next several minutes. However, after the midway point of the first period, Ed Germond broke the game open and began an avalanche of goals for the Panthers. In under 8 minutes, Middlebury got 5 goals to finish the period up 6–0. The second began just as the first ended with Latreille recording two goals in quick succession before Norwich finally found the back of the net with two quick markers. Those tallies only seemed to anger the Panthers, who proceeded to run roughshod over the home team for the rest of the game. Goals came fast a furious in the third with Latreille picking up three goals and an assist while the Frybergers continued to pile up the points. Middlebury finished the match with a new season high in 17 goals. The torrid pace appeared to sap some of Phil's regular energy for the next game and he was rather pedestrian with just 3 assists against Williams Williams. The rest of the team was in fine form which enabled Middlebury to coast to an easy victory.

Entering the final weekend of the season, Phil Latreille was far and away the top scorer in the nation. Even with 69 goals in 19 games, he was still eight shy of tying the record he set the previous year and was eight points away from becoming the first player to reach the century mark. With 1,500 fans in attendance for his final home game against Dartmouth, Latreille played possibly the finest game of his college career. He scored a hat-tick in the first period while Germond, Bob and Dates each found the back of the net to build a 6–0 lead. Dates and Phil added two more at the start of the second. After Dartmouth interrupted the scoring exhibition with its first of the night, Latreille collected his fifth tally of the game to set a new NCAA record with his 97th point of the season, breaking the mark he reached a year before. Buoyed by the cheers from the home crowd, Phil added a goal and an assist to his total. Near the end of the period, Latreille assisted on a Hultgren marker for his 100th point of the season. After a second Dartmouth goal, Phil got his third assist of the night on a second Hultgren tally to produce 9 points in two periods. Before the start of the third, the team held a ceremony to honor the entire senior class while Latreille received a plaque from the Panthers and had his number (16) permanently retired. The festivities didn't dim the offensive display as Latreille assisted on a Dates goal just 34 seconds into the period. Phil then set a new program record by scoring his eleventh point of the night, surpassing another one of his previous high-water marks. Dates Fryberger and Dartmouth combined for three more goals to finish off the game but the night belonged to Phil Latreille.

In the regular season finale, Latreille was just 2 goals away from setting a new NCAA record. It took less than 6 minutes for him to tie his year-old mark of 77 goals and at 16:54 of the first period he managed to surpass that lofty total. Latreille then picked up an assist at the start of the second on a Germond goal before Hamilton decided to get in on the action. Two quick markers from the Continentals narrowed the Panther's lead but Latreille finished off his hat-trick soon afterwards. A third goal from the home team left the score at 5–3 entering the third and the two defenses kept the scoresheet clean for most of the period. Bobby finished off his college career with a goal at the 14-minute mark and, a few minutes later, Phil netted his 80th goal of the campaign.

=== NCAA tournament ===
At the end of the year, Middlebury had posted a tremendous record of 19–2 with their only losses being 1-goal decisions to two of the best teams in the nation, both on the road. While the Panthers had an argument for inclusion into the NCAA tournament, there was a significant problem that they could not overcome. At the time, NCAA rules limited players to just three years of varsity play. This 'freshman rule' typically resulted in programs running a freshman team for first-year students and then allow them to play on the varsity team afterwards. Middlebury, a fairly small school, did not operate a freshman team and thus most of its players played varsity for all four years of their undergraduate careers. Due to the lax nature of the NCAA's oversight of ice hockey, they did not prevent any of the Panthers from playing during the season, however, if the NCAA committee were to offer Middlebury an invitation to the tournament, the team would only be able to participate if their four-year players were not dressed for the games. Since this would have meant playing without Phil Latreille, Bob Fryberger, Jerry Fryberger, Frank Coy and Keith Dollar (among others), the Panthers would have had virtually no chance to compete with the other final four teams. Thus, the NCAA didn't even consider offering Middlebury a bid despite the fact that they possessed the best record of all eastern teams.

=== Phil Latreille ===
At the end of his career, Phil Latreille stood atop virtually every scoring mark in college hockey history. He was the first player to reach 100 points in a season and his total of 108 would not be surpassed for 24 years. When it was, by Bill Watson, the new record holder would only be able to do so in 46 games, more than twice the number that Lateille had needed. However, his record of 80 goals in one season is a records that still stands as of 2024. Additionally, Latreille is the only player to even reach 60 goals in a season with the next highest total being 59 by Mike Donnelly in 1986. Latreille also averaged just under 4 goals a game for the season (3.81), breaking the record he had set the year before. The next closest player to the mark is Frank Chiarelli who averaged 3.05 goals per game in 1951. No player since has even averaged two goals per game for an entire season. With the addition of his 28 assists, Latreille also averaged just over 5 points per game for the season (5.14), breaking the record that Chiarelli had also set in 1951.

For his career totals, Latreille's numbers are nearly inconceivable. In just 83 career games, he scored 250 goals. Not only has no other player reached 200 markers in their career but the second all-time leading goal scorer in NCAA history (Chuck Delich) has just 156 to his credit, again with significantly more games played. Latreille averaged almost exactly 3 goals per game for his four-year college career (3.01) to set a pace that is virtually impossible to replicate. Despite his low number of career assists, Latreille is also the NCAA's all-time leader in points. His final total of 346 is not nearly as far ahead of second place as his goal total with Tom Ross only 22 points short, however, Ross played 72 more games in his career and was still unable to catch Latreille.

The performance that Latreille put on for four years was so otherworldly that he became the first player from Middlebury to reach the NHL. After the Panthers' season was complete, Latreille played 4 games for the New York Rangers but was held scoreless. Though his appearance was brief, Latreille remains the only alumnus to appear in the NHL (as of 2024).

== Roster ==
No.	Nat.	Player	Class	Pos	Height	Weight	DoB	Hometown	Previous team
1	(United States)	Chuck Gately	Junior	G				Melrose, Massachusetts
2	(United States)	Jim McKeown	Sophomore	D				Lake Placid, New York
3	(United States)	C. Barry White	Sophomore	F				Melrose, Massachusetts
6	(United States)	Ed Germond	Sophomore	F				Clinton, New York
7	(United States)	John Weekes	Sophomore	D				Oyster Bay, New York
8	(United States)	Robert Fryberger	Senior	F			1937-05-14	Duluth, Minnesota
9		Keith Dollar	Senior	D
12	(United States)	Jerry Fryberger	Senior	F			1937-05-14	Duluth, Minnesota
14	(Canada)	Frank Coy	Senior	D				St. Catharines, Ontario
15	(Norway)	Tor Hultgren	Senior	F			1938-08-25	Drammen, Norway
16	(Canada)	Phil Latreille (C)	Senior	F			1938-04-22	Montreal, Quebec
18	(United States)	Roger Lewandowski	Freshman	F				Oyster Bay, New York
19	(United States)	Dates Fryberger	Sophomore	F			1940-05-04	Duluth, Minnesota
20	(United States)	John Flynn	Sophomore					Milton, Massachusetts
22	(United States)	Peter Connal	Senior					Yonkers, New York
		Frank Constanzo	Senior	G
	(Canada)	Tracy Perry	Senior	D
	(Canada)	Peter McLagan	Junior	D				Montreal, Quebec
	(United States)	Nick Orr	Sophomore	D				West Islip, New York
		Art Wilkes	Senior

== Standings ==
1960–61 NCAA Independent ice hockey standings
	Intercollegiate							Overall					
	GP	W	L	T	Pct.	GF	GA	GP	W	L	T	GF	GA
Amherst	–	–	–	–	–	–	–	17	4	13	0	–	–
American International	–	–	–	–	–	–	–	17	5	12	0	–	–
Army	21	13	8	0	.619	107	58	25	17	8	0	139	62
Boston College	–	–	–	–	–	–	–	25	19	5	1	143	55
Boston University	24	10	14	0	.417	98	104	24	10	14	0	98	104
Bowdoin	–	–	–	–	–	–	–	20	15	5	0	–	–
Brown	–	–	–	–	–	–	–	20	0	20	0	30	117
Colby	–	–	–	–	–	–	–	23	18	5	0	–	–
Colgate	–	–	–	–	–	–	–	24	8	15	1	88	110
Connecticut	–	–	–	–	–	–	–	11	4	6	1	55	69
Cornell	–	–	–	–	–	–	–	19	7	12	0	66	58
Dartmouth	–	–	–	–	–	–	–	19	8	11	0	87	118
Hamilton	–	–	–	–	–	–	–	17	2	14	1	–	–
Harvard	–	–	–	–	–	–	–	24	18	4	2	106	47
Massachusetts	–	–	–	–	–	–	–	14	7	6	1	45	69
Merrimack	–	–	–	–	–	–	–	12	5	7	0	52	64
Middlebury	16	14	2	0	.875	158	44	21	19	2	0	192	56
MIT	–	–	–	–	–	–	–	14	8	6	0	–	–
New Hampshire	–	–	–	–	–	–	–	14	3	11	0	41	74
Northeastern	–	–	–	–	–	–	–	26	12	14	0	106	131
Norwich	–	–	–	–	–	–	–	21	10	11	0	–	–
Princeton	–	–	–	–	–	–	–	23	9	14	0	82	127
Providence	–	–	–	–	–	–	–	20	11	9	0	120	90
St. Olaf	–	–	–	–	–	–	–	7	3	4	0	–	–
Williams	–	–	–	–	–	–	–	20	16	4	0	–	–
Yale	–	–	–	–	–	–	–	25	12	12	1	92	94

== Schedule and results ==
Date	Opponent	Site	Result	Record
Regular Season
November 19	Royal Military College Saint-Jean*	War Memorial Field House • Middlebury, Vermont	W 3–2	1–0–0
December 3	at Royal Military College Saint-Jean*	Saint-Jean-sur-Richelieu, Quebec	W 10–2	2–0–0
December 7	at Princeton*	Hobey Baker Memorial Rink • Princeton, New Jersey	W 7–6 ^{OT}	3–0–0
December 10	Colgate*	War Memorial Field House • Middlebury, Vermont	W 5–0	4–0–0
December 12	at Clarkson*	Clarkson Arena • Potsdam, New York	L 2–3	4–1–0
January 6	Hamilton*	War Memorial Field House • Middlebury, Vermont	W 9–0	5–1–0
January 7	American International*	War Memorial Field House • Middlebury, Vermont	W 16–0	6–1–0
January 13	at Army*	Smith Rink • West Point, New York	W 11–2	7–1–0
January 14	at Yale*	Ingalls Rink • New Haven, Connecticut	W 7–6 ^{OT}	8–1–0
January 18	at Dartmouth*	Davis Rink • Hanover, New Hampshire	W 10–7	9–1–0
January 21	Northeastern*	War Memorial Field House • Middlebury, Vermont	W 6–1	10–1–0
February 3	at Macdonald*	Montreal, Quebec	W 9–4	11–1–0
February 4	at Bishop's*	Sherbrooke Arena • Sherbrooke, Quebec	W 6–3	12–1–0
February 10	Norwich*	War Memorial Field House • Middlebury, Vermont	W 16–5	13–1–0
February 11	St. Nicholas Hockey Club*	War Memorial Field House • Middlebury, Vermont	W 6–1	14–1–0
February 17	at Amherst*	Orr Rink • Amherst, Massachusetts	W 16–1	15–1–0
February 18	at Rensselaer*	Houston Field House • Troy, New York	L 4–5	15–2–0
February 23	at Norwich*	Northfield, Vermont	W 17–1	16–2–0
February 24	Williams*	War Memorial Field House • Middlebury, Vermont	W 8–1	17–2–0
March 1	Dartmouth*	War Memorial Field House • Middlebury, Vermont	W 17–3	18–2–0
March 2	at Hamilton*	Russell Sage Rink • Clinton, New York	W 7–3	19–2–0
*Non-conference game.

== Awards and honors ==
Award	Player
AHCA All-American East Team	Phil Latreille

== Phil Latreille's scoring totals ==
Date	Opponent	Goals	Assists	Points
Nov. 19	RMCSJ	1	1	2
Dec. 3	RMCSJ	5	1	6
Dec. 7	Princeton	2	1	3
Dec. 10	Colgate	2	1	3
Dec. 12	Clarkson	1	1	2
Jan. 6	Hamilton	5	1	6
Jan. 7	AIC	8	1	9
Jan. 13	Army	6	1	7
Jan. 14	Yale	2	3	5
Jan. 18	Dartmouth	5	2	7
Jan. 21	Northeastern	0	2	2
Feb. 3	Macdonald	5	0	5
Feb. 4	Bishop's	4	0	4
Feb. 10	Norwich	7	1	8
Feb. 11	St. Nick's	0	2	2
Feb. 17	Amherst	6	2	8
Feb. 18	RPI	3	0	3
Feb. 23	Norwich	7	1	8
Feb. 24	Williams	0	2	2
Mar. 1	Dartmouth	7	4	11
Mar. 2	Hamilton	4	1	5
Total		80	28	108
