= Bishop's Gaiters men's ice hockey =

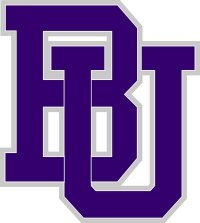
- University: Bishop's University
- Arena: Sherbrooke, Quebec
- Colors: Purple and Silver

The Bishop's Gaiters men's ice hockey team is an active ice hockey club team made up of students attending Bishop's University. The team was organized as a varsity program at least as far back as 1925, playing until 1982. The dormant program was resurrected as an unofficial club team in 2010.

== History ==
Bishop's ice hockey team first appeared in the Intermediate Intercollegiate Series (second tier) in 1925. Early on, the Gaiters were one of the better teams, winning four division titles in their first seven seasons. The team declined over the course of the 1930s and were forced to suspend play after the outbreak of World War II. Because the IIS did not return after the war, Bishop's was one of several smaller colleges that were left without a home in the late 40's. After playing as an independent for a few years, Bishop's joined with seven other nearby teams and formed the Ottawa–St. Lawrence Conference (OSLC). The league grew in status throughout the 1950s and, by the time that the first University Cup was held, the OSLC champion was one of four teams invited to participate.

Unfortunately, the Gaiters did not see much success for many years, often finishing near the bottom of the standings. It wasn't until 1967 that Bishop's was able to make a postseason appearance, though they remained competitive thereafter. 1971, the conferences were realigned along provincial lines with Bishop's placed into the Quebec Universities Athletic Association. The Gaiters made the postseason most years, however, the team didn't win a single playoff game. Additionally, by the early 80s, the team had slid down the standings and was no longer a threat to the conference leaders. The lack of on-ice success convinced the school that the program was no longer worth supporting and they mothballed the team in 1982.

Almost 30 years later, Kevin Gagnon brought men's ice hockey back to Bishop's. While the university permitted the club to wear the school colors, they have yet to formally support the team (as of 2024).

== Season-by-season results ==
=== Senior hockey and intermediate collegiate play ===
Note: GP = Games played, W = Wins, L = Losses, T = Ties, OTL = Overtime Losses, SOL = Shootout Losses, Pts = Points

U Sports Champion	U Sports Semifinalist	Conference regular season champions	Conference Division Champions	Conference Playoff Champions

Season	Conference	Regular Season													Conference Tournament Results	National Tournament Results
Season	Conference	Conference								Overall					Conference Tournament Results	National Tournament Results
Season	Conference	GP	W	L	T	OTL	SOL	Pts*	Finish	GP	W	L	T	%	Conference Tournament Results	National Tournament Results
1925–26	IIS	?	?	?	?	?	?	?	1st	?	?	?	?	?	Lost Semifinal, 1–3 (Royal Military College)	
1926–27	?	?	?	?	?	?	?	?	?	?	?	?	?	?		
1927–28	IIS	4	2	1	1	–	–	5	2nd	?	?	?	?	?		
1928–29	IIS	4	3	1	0	–	–	6	2nd	?	?	?	?	?		
1929–30	IIS	5	5	0	0	–	–	10	1st	?	?	?	?	?	Lost Championship, 1–4 (Toronto II)	
1930–31	IIS	4	3	0	1	–	–	7	1st	?	?	?	?	?	Lost Semifinal, 0–4 (Queen's)	
1931–32	IIS	?	?	?	?	?	?	?	1st	?	?	?	?	?	Lost Semifinal, 1–10 (Toronto II)	
1932–33	IIS	6	0	5	1	–	–	1	4th	?	?	?	?	?		
1933–34	IIS	5	2	3	0	–	–	4	T–2nd	?	?	?	?	?		
1934–35	IIS	6	4	1	1	–	–	9	2nd	?	?	?	?	?		
1935–36	IIS	7	1	5	1	–	–	3	5th	?	?	?	?	?		
1936–37	IIS	7	1	6	0	–	–	2	5th	?	?	?	?	?		
1937–38	IIS	7	2	5	0	–	–	4	T–3rd	?	?	?	?	?		
1938–39	IIS	5	1	4	0	–	–	2	5th	?	?	?	?	?		
Program suspended due to World War II
1946–47	Independent	?	?	?	?	?	?	?	?	?	?	?	?	?		
1947–48	Independent	?	?	?	?	?	?	?	?	?	?	?	?	?		
1948–49	Independent	?	?	?	?	?	?	?	?	?	?	?	?	?		
1949–50	OSLC	?	?	?	?	?	?	?	?	?	?	?	?	?		
1950–51	OSLC	6	2	4	0	–	–	.333	4th	?	?	?	?	?		
1951–52	OSLC	7	3	4	0	–	–	.429	3rd	?	?	?	?	?		
1952–53	OSLC	6	0	5	1	–	–	1	T–6th	?	?	?	?	?		
1953–54	OSLC	6	1	5	0	–	–	.167	T–6th	?	?	?	?	?		
1954–55	OSLC	3	1	2	0	–	–	.333	4th	?	?	?	?	?		
1955–56	OSLC	8	0	7	1	–	–	.063	5th	?	?	?	?	?		
1956–57	OSLC	?	?	?	?	?	?	?	?	?	?	?	?	?		
1957–58	OSLC	?	?	?	?	?	?	?	?	?	?	?	?	?		
1958–59	OSLC	?	?	?	?	?	?	?	?	?	?	?	?	?		
1959–60	OSLC	9	2	7	0	–	–	.222	5th	?	?	?	?	?		
1960–61	OSLC	?	?	?	?	?	?	?	?	?	?	?	?	?		
Totals										GP	W	L	T/SOL	%	Championships	
Regular Season										—	—	—	—	—	4 East Division Titles	
Conference Post-season										—	—	—	—	—		
U Sports Postseason										—	—	—	—	—		
Regular Season and Postseason Record										—	—	—	—	—		

=== Senior collegiate play ===
Note: GP = Games played, W = Wins, L = Losses, T = Ties, OTL = Overtime Losses, SOL = Shootout Losses, Pts = Points

U Sports Champion	U Sports Semifinalist	Conference regular season champions	Conference Division Champions	Conference Playoff Champions

Season	Conference	Regular Season													Conference Tournament Results	National Tournament Results
Season	Conference	Conference								Overall					Conference Tournament Results	National Tournament Results
Season	Conference	GP	W	L	T	OTL	SOL	Pts*	Finish	GP	W	L	T	%	Conference Tournament Results	National Tournament Results
1961–62	OSLC	10	3	5	2	–	–	8	4th	10	3	5	2	.400		
1962–63	OSLC	14	3	11	0	–	–	6	8th	14	3	11	0	.214		
1963–64	OSLC	14	4	9	1	–	–	9	7th	14	4	9	1	.321		
1964–65	OSLC	14	3	10	1	–	–	7	6th	14	3	10	1	.250		
1965–66	OSLC	16	5	10	1	–	–	11	7th	16	5	10	1	.344		
1966–67	OSLC	18	12	6	0	–	–	24	3rd	19	12	7	0	.667	Lost Semifinal, 6–10 (Loyola)	
1967–68	OSLC	16	9	6	1	–	–	19	4th	17	9	7	1	.559	Lost Semifinal, 1–7 (Loyola)	
1968–69	OSLC	18	10	7	1	–	–	21	T–2nd	20	11	8	1	.575	Won Semifinal, 5–4 (Sherbrooke); Lost Championship, 2–3 (Sir George Williams)	
1969–70	OSLC	14	8	6	0	–	–	16	4th	15	8	7	0	.533	Lost Semifinal, 2–8 (Loyola)	
1970–71	OSLC	18	10	6	2	–	–	22	3rd	19	10	9	2	.524	Lost Semifinal, 4–5 (Quebec–Trois-Rivières)	
1971–72	QUAA	21	11	8	2	–	–	24	4th	22	11	9	2	.545	Lost Semifinal, 3–5 (Loyola)	
1972–73	QUAA	24	14	9	1	–	–	29	3rd	25	14	10	1	.580	Lost Semifinal, 1–7 (Loyola)	
1973–74	QUAA	18	4	11	3	–	–	11	6th	19	4	12	3	.289	Lost Quarterfinal, 1–9 (Sir George Williams)	
1974–75	QUAA	20	0	19	1	–	–	1	5th	20	0	19	1	.025		
1975–76	QUAA	20	6	12	2	–	–	14	4th	22	6	14	2	.318	Lost Semifinal series, 0–2 (Concordia)	
1976–77	QUAA	20	7	12	1	–	–	15	4th	22	7	14	1	.341	Lost Semifinal series, 0–2 (Quebec–Trois-Rivières)	
1977–78	QUAA	16	4	12	0	–	–	8	4th	18	4	14	0	.222	Lost Semifinal series, 0–2 (Concordia)	
1978–79	QUAA	20	2	17	1	–	–	5	6th	20	2	17	1	.125		
1979–80	QUAA	23	11	11	1	–	–	23	4th	25	11	13	1	.460	Lost Semifinal series, 0–2 (Quebec–Trois-Rivières)	
1980–81	QUAA	24	3	19	2	–	–	8	7th	24	3	19	2	.167		
1981–82	QUAA	24	5	14	5	–	–	15	6th	24	5	14	5	.313		
program suspended
Totals										GP	W	L	T/SOL	%	Championships	
Regular Season										374	131	217	26	.385		
Conference Post-season										17	1	16	0	.059		
U Sports Postseason										0	0	0	0	–		
Regular Season and Postseason Record										391	132	233	26	.371		

Note: Totals include senior collegiate play only.

== See also ==
- Bishop's Gaiters women's ice hockey
