= Concordia Stingers men's ice hockey =

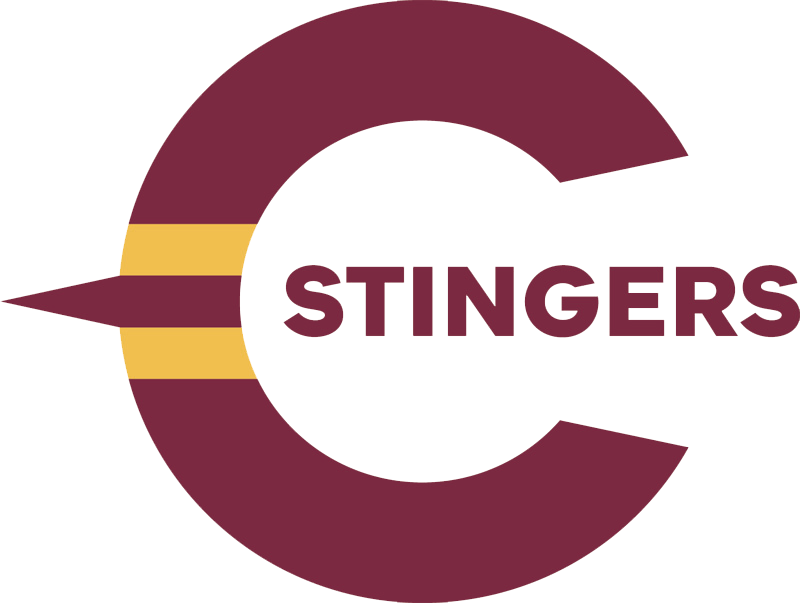
- University: Concordia University
- Conference: OUA; OUA East Division
- First season: 1975–76
- Head coach: Marc-André Element; Since 2015–16 season
- Assistant coaches: Alexandre Jacques; Patrick Drolet; Jim Corsi
- Arena: Ed Meagher Arena; Montreal, Quebec
- Colors: Maroon, Gold, and White

U Sports tournament appearances
- Loyola: 1968, 1970, 1971, 1973, 1975 Sir George Williams: 1964, 1965, 1966, 1967, 1969, 1972, 1974 Concordia: 1976, 1977, 1978, 1979, 1980, 1981, 1982, 1983, 1984, 2018, 2023, 2025

Conference tournament champions
- Loyola: 1968, 1970, 1971, 1973, 1975 Sir George Williams: 1962, 1964, 1965, 1966, 1967, 1969, 1972, 1974 Concordia: 1976, 1977, 1978, 1979, 1980, 1981, 1982, 1983, 1984, 2025

Conference regular season champions
- Loyola: 1917, 1918, 1926, 1946, 1950, 1951, 1952, 1953, 1954, 1956, 1957, 1958, 1959, 1960, 1968, 1969, 1970, 1971, 1972, 1974, 1975 Sir George Williams: 1966, 1967, 1973 Concordia: 1976, 1977, 1978, 1979, 1981, 1982, 1983, 1984

The Concordia Stingers men's ice hockey team is an active ice hockey team representing the Concordia Stingers athletics program of Concordia University. The team is a member of the Ontario University Athletics conference and competes in U Sports. The Stingers play their home games at the Ed Meagher Arena in Montreal, Quebec.

== History ==
The history of ice hockey at Concordia predates the university by more than half a century. Loyola College opened its doors at the end of the 19th century but did not have the ability to confer degrees to graduated until it became affiliated with Université Laval in 1903. That year, the school fielded its first ice hockey team, playing in the Junior Amateur Hockey Association, a forerunner of the QMJHL. Aside from World War I and 1927, Loyola iced a junior team every year until 1933. During this time, the school briefly fielded a senior team, playing in the Montreal City Hockey League (MCHL) from 1916 until 1923.

No hockey teams appears to have been active at Loyola from 1933 until 1945 when the school was a member of the short-lived Senior Intercollegiate League (SIL), winning the championship in the only season of play. That same year, the nearby Sir George Williams University joined Loyola on the ice for the first time, with both playing out of the SIL. The existence of either team over the next three years is uncertain as no formal organization for intermediate (second tier) teams existed, however, both schools were founding members of the Ottawa–St. Lawrence Conference (OSLC) in 1949. Loyola was the league's first powerhouse, winning the league championship in each of the first five seasons. The Warriors reeled off a second run of five titles from '56 until '60, (coincidentally mirroring the Montreal Canadiens). The strong play from Loyola helped to raise the profile of the OSLC and by the time that the first University Cup was held, the league was one of four conferences to receive an invitation.

By the early-60s, Sir George Williams had surpassed Loyola as the dominant program in the conference. The Georgians won the league championship six times in eight years, making the University Cup five times by the end of the decade. Unfortunately, George Williams was unable to capture the title, finishing as runners-up on three separate occasions. Loyola was able to regain its footing by the late 60's and both schools fought furiously over the league championship. In fact, other than '55, '61 and '63, the OSLC championship went to either Loyola or Sir George Williams.

In 1971 the four extant conferences that shared teams in Quebec and Ontario were realigned into two provincial leagues with both schools being placed in the Quebec Universities Athletic Association (QUAA). In the first four seasons, the league championship alternated between the two teams. 1974 brought about a massive change for both teams; due to the policy of the Canadian government to secularize its college system nationwide, Loyola and Sir George Williams merged in August of 1974. Despite being a singular institution, that season saw each campus field their ice hockey teams for the final time before uniting into one entity for the 1975–76 season. The newly-christened Concordia Stingers continued the dominance of their predecessors and won the QUAA championship every year from 1976 until 1984 and twice finished as national runners-up.

Unfortunately, the success of Concordia did the QUAA no favors. With most of the other league members unable to compete against the vaunted Stingers, the league hemorrhaged teams throughout its existence and by 1987, there were just four programs remaining. The league was discontinued when the parent conference stopped sponsoring ice hockey and all four teams were absorbed into the Ontario University Athletic Association (OUAA). Unfortunately for the Stingers, the team had trouble finding their way in their new league. Concordia has had some regular season success but playoff accolades have largely eluded the program. Concordia was finally able to earn a bid back to the national tournament in 2018, ending a 34-year drought. Since Marc-André Element took over as head coach in 2015, the team had performed much better in postseason play and was able to make its most recent University Cup appearance in 2023.

== Season-by-season results ==
=== Loyola ===
==== Junior, senior and intermediate hockey ====
Note: GP = Games played, W = Wins, L = Losses, T = Ties, Pts = Points

Extra-League Champion	U Sports Semifinalist	Conference regular season champions	Conference Division Champions	Conference Playoff Champions

Season	Conference	Regular Season											Conference Tournament Results	National Tournament Results
Season	Conference	Conference						Overall					Conference Tournament Results	National Tournament Results
Season	Conference	GP	W	L	T	Pts*	Finish	GP	W	L	T	%	Conference Tournament Results	National Tournament Results
1903–04	JAHA	?	?	?	?	?	?	?	?	?	?	?		
1904–05	JAHA	?	?	?	?	?	?	?	?	?	?	?		
1905–06	JAHA	?	?	?	?	?	?	?	?	?	?	?		
1906–07	JAHA	?	?	?	?	?	?	?	?	?	?	?		
1907–08	JAHA	?	?	?	?	?	?	?	?	?	?	?		
1908–09	JAHA	?	?	?	?	?	?	?	?	?	?	?		
1909–10	JAHA	?	?	?	?	?	?	?	?	?	?	?	Lost Championship, 2–10 McGill	
1910–11	JAHA	?	?	?	?	?	?	?	?	?	?	?		
1911–12	JAHA	?	?	?	?	?	?	?	?	?	?	?		
1912–13	JAHA	?	?	?	?	?	?	?	?	?	?	?		
1913–14	JAHA	?	?	?	?	?	?	?	?	?	?	?		
1914–15	JAHA	?	?	?	?	?	?	?	?	?	?	?		
1916–17	MCHL	10	7	2	1	15	1st	?	?	?	?	?	Lost Art Ross Cup challenge, 0–1 (Quebec Sons of Ireland)	
1917–18	MCHL	10	7	1	2	16	T–1st	?	?	?	?	?	Lost Championship, 1–14 (McGill)	
1918–19	JAHA	?	?	?	?	?	?	?	?	?	?	?		
1918–19	MCHL	9	5	4	0	10	4th	?	?	?	?	?		
1919–20	JAHA	?	?	?	?	?	?	?	?	?	?	?		
1919–20	MCHL	7	3	4	0	6	6th	?	?	?	?	?		
1920–21	JAHA	?	?	?	?	?	?	?	?	?	?	?		
1920–21	MCHL	7	1	6	0	2	7th	?	?	?	?	?		
1921–22	JAHA	?	?	?	?	?	?	?	?	?	?	?		
1921–22	MCHL	7	4	3	0	8	4th	?	?	?	?	?	Lost Semifinal, 1–2 (Montreal Ste. Anne)	
1922–23	JAHA	?	?	?	?	?	?	?	?	?	?	?		
1922–23	MCHL	10	2	8	0	4	6th	?	?	?	?	?		
1923–24	JAHA	?	?	?	?	?	?	?	?	?	?	?		
1924–25	JAHA	?	?	?	?	?	?	?	?	?	?	?		
1925–26	MIJL	?	?	?	?	?	1st	?	?	?	?	?	Lost First Round series 4–5 (Montreal Victorias)	
1927–28	JAHA	?	?	?	?	?	?	?	?	?	?	?		
1928–29	JAHA	?	?	?	?	?	?	?	?	?	?	?		
1929–30	JAHA	?	?	?	?	?	?	?	?	?	?	?		
1930–31	JAHA	?	?	?	?	?	?	?	?	?	?	?		
1931–32	JAHA	?	?	?	?	?	?	?	?	?	?	?		
1932–33	JAHA	?	?	?	?	?	?	?	?	?	?	?		
program suspended
1945–46	SIL	6	4	1	1	6	1st	?	?	?	?	?		
1946–47	Independent	?	?	?	?	?	?	?	?	?	?	?		
1947–48	Independent	?	?	?	?	?	?	?	?	?	?	?		
1948–49	Independent	?	?	?	?	?	?	?	?	?	?	?		
1949–50	OSLC	?	?	?	?	?	1st	?	?	?	?	?		
1950–51	OSLC	9	8	0	1	17	1st	?	?	?	?	?		
1951–52	OSLC	8	7	1	0	14	1st	?	?	?	?	?		
1952–53	OSLC	6	6	0	0	12	1st	?	?	?	?	?		
1953–54	OSLC	7	7	0	0	14	1st	?	?	?	?	?		
1954–55	OSLC	5	4	1	0	8	2nd	?	?	?	?	?		
1955–56	OSLC	8	7	1	0	14	1st	?	?	?	?	?		
1956–57	OSLC	8	7	1	0	14	1st	?	?	?	?	?		
1957–58	OSLC	?	?	?	?	?	1st	?	?	?	?	?		
1958–59	OSLC	?	?	?	?	?	1st	?	?	?	?	?		
1959–60	OSLC	10	8	1	1	17	1st	?	?	?	?	?		
1960–61	OSLC	?	?	?	?	?	?	?	?	?	?	?		
Totals								GP	W	L	T	%	Championships	
Regular Season								?	?	?	?	?	2 MCHL Championships, 1 MIHL Championship, 1 SIL Championship, 10 OSLC Championships	
Conference Post-season								?	?	?	?	?		
Regular Season and Postseason Record								?	?	?	?	?	1 Quebec Senior League Championship, 2 Quebec Senior Championships	

==== Senior collegiate ====
Note: GP = Games played, W = Wins, L = Losses, T = Ties, OTL = Overtime Losses, SOL = Shootout Losses, Pts = Points

U Sports Champion	U Sports Semifinalist	Conference regular season champions	Conference Division Champions	Conference Playoff Champions

Season	Conference	Regular Season													Conference Tournament Results	National Tournament Results
Season	Conference	Conference								Overall					Conference Tournament Results	National Tournament Results
Season	Conference	GP	W	L	T	OTL	SOL	Pts*	Finish	GP	W	L	T	%	Conference Tournament Results	National Tournament Results
1961–62	OSLC	10	3	6	1	–	–	7	T–5th	10	3	6	1	.350		
1962–63	OSLC	9	3	5	1	–	–	7	5th	9	3	5	1	.389		
1963–64	OSLC	14	8	5	1	–	–	17	4th	14	8	5	1	.607		
1964–65	OSLC	14	6	8	0	–	–	12	5th	14	6	8	0	.429		
1965–66	OSLC	16	12	3	1	–	–	25	2nd	18	13	4	1	.750	Won Semifinal, 7–6 (Ottawa); Lost Championship, 4–5 (Sir George Williams)	
1966–67	OSLC	18	14	3	1	–	–	29	2nd	20	15	4	1	.775	Won Semifinal, 7–2 (Bishop's); Lost Championship, 4–5 (Sir George Williams)	
1967–68	OSLC	16	15	1	0	–	–	30	1st	20	18	2	0	.900	Won Semifinal, 7–1 (Bishop's); Won Championship, 6–2 (Sir George Williams)	Won Semifinal, 1–0 (Toronto); Lost Championship, 4–5 (Alberta)
1968–69	OSLC	18	16	1	1	–	–	33	1st	19	16	2	1	.868	Lost Semifinal, 2–4 (Sir George Williams)	
1969–70	OSLC	14	13	0	1	–	–	27	1st	18	15	2	1	.861	Won Semifinal, 8–2 (Bishop's); Won Championship, 2–1 (Sherbrooke)	Lost Semifinal, 0–4 (Saint Mary's); Lost Consolation Final, 4–5 (York)
1970–71	OSLC	18	15	2	1	–	–	31	1st	22	17	4	1	.795	Won Semifinal, 10–3 (Sherbrooke); Won Championship, 3–1 (Quebec–Trois-Rivières)	Lost Quarterfinal, 3–6 (Laurentian); Lost Consolation Semifinal, 4–6 (British Columbia)
1971–72	QUAA	21	16	2	3	–	–	35	1st	23	17	3	3	.804	Won Semifinal, 5–3 (Bishop's); Lost Championship, 0–1 (Sir George Williams)	
1972–73	QUAA	24	15	8	1	–	–	31	2nd	28	17	10	1	.625	Won Semifinal, 7–1 (Bishop's); Won Championship, 7–4 (Sir George Williams)	Lost Semifinal series, 0–2 (Saint Mary's)
1973–74	QUAA	18	14	2	2	–	–	30	T–1st	23	17	3	3	.804	Lost Semifinal, 4–5 (Sir George Williams)	
1974–75	QUAA	20	16	2	2	–	–	34	1st	25	19	4	2	.800	Won Semifinal, 9–1 (McGill); Won Championship series, 2–0 (Sir George Williams)	Lost Semifinal series, 0–2 (Alberta)
Totals										GP	W	L	T/SOL	%	Championships	
Regular Season										235	170	48	17	.760	4 OSLC Championships, 3 QUAA Championships	
Conference Post-season										18	13	5	0	.722	3 OSLC Championships, 2 QUAA Championships	
U Sports Postseason										10	1	9	0	.100	5 National tournament appearances	
Regular Season and Postseason Record										263	184	62	17	.732		

Note: Totals include results from 1961–62 onward.

=== Sir George Williams ===
==== Intermediate hockey ====
Note: GP = Games played, W = Wins, L = Losses, T = Ties, Pts = Points

Extra-League Champion	U Sports Semifinalist	Conference regular season champions	Conference Division Champions	Conference Playoff Champions

Season	Conference	Regular Season											Conference Tournament Results	National Tournament Results
Season	Conference	Conference						Overall					Conference Tournament Results	National Tournament Results
Season	Conference	GP	W	L	T	Pts*	Finish	GP	W	L	T	%	Conference Tournament Results	National Tournament Results
1945–46	SIL	6	0	6	0	0	4th	?	?	?	?	?		
1946–47	Independent	?	?	?	?	?	?	?	?	?	?	?		
1947–48	Independent	?	?	?	?	?	?	?	?	?	?	?		
1948–49	Independent	?	?	?	?	?	?	?	?	?	?	?		
1949–50	OSLC	?	?	?	?	?	?	?	?	?	?	?		
1950–51	OSLC	9	2	6	1	5	5th	?	?	?	?	?		
1951–52	Independent	?	?	?	?	?	?	?	?	?	?	?		
1952–53	OSLC	6	2	4	0	4	5th	?	?	?	?	?		
1953–54	OSLC	12	6	3	3	15	4th	?	?	?	?	?		
1954–55	OSLC	5	0	4	0	0	8th	?	?	?	?	?		
1955–56	OSLC	8	5	2	0	10	2nd	?	?	?	?	?		
1956–57	OSLC	?	?	?	?	?	?	?	?	?	?	?		
1957–58	OSLC	?	?	?	?	?	?	?	?	?	?	?		
1958–59	OSLC	?	?	?	?	?	?	?	?	?	?	?		
1959–60	OSLC	10	8	2	0	16	2nd	?	?	?	?	?		
1960–61	OSLC	?	?	?	?	?	?	?	?	?	?	?		
Totals								GP	W	L	T	%	Championships	
Regular Season								?	?	?	?	?		
Conference Post-season								?	?	?	?	?		
Regular Season and Postseason Record								?	?	?	?	?		

==== Senior collegiate ====
Note: GP = Games played, W = Wins, L = Losses, T = Ties, OTL = Overtime Losses, SOL = Shootout Losses, Pts = Points

U Sports Champion	U Sports Semifinalist	Conference regular season champions	Conference Division Champions	Conference Playoff Champions

Season	Conference	Regular Season													Conference Tournament Results	National Tournament Results
Season	Conference	Conference								Overall					Conference Tournament Results	National Tournament Results
Season	Conference	GP	W	L	T	OTL	SOL	Pts*	Finish	GP	W	L	T	%	Conference Tournament Results	National Tournament Results
1961–62	OSLC	10	8	1	1	–	–	17	2nd	11	9	1	1	.864	Won Championship, 4–2 (Ottawa)	
1962–63	OSLC	14	5	8	1	–	–	11	4th	15	5	9	1	.367	Lost Semifinal, 3–5 (Ottawa)	
1963–64	OSLC	14	8	4	2	–	–	18	3rd	18	11	5	2	.667	Won Semifinal, 4–3 (Ottawa); Won Championship, 5–2 (Royal Military College)	Won Semifinal, 4–1 (Montreal); Lost Championship, 1–9 (Alberta)
1964–65	OSLC	14	11	3	0	–	–	22	2nd	18	13	5	0	.722	Won Semifinal, 4–3 (Carleton); Won Championship, 6–5 (Loyola)	Lost Semifinal, 1–3 (Saint Dunstan's); Lost Third Place Game, 3–8 (Laurentian)
1965–66	OSLC	16	14	1	1	–	–	29	1st	19	16	2	1	.868	Won Semifinal, 5–4 (Royal Military College); Won Championship, 5–4 (Loyola)	Lost Quarterfinal, 7–9 (Toronto)
1966–67	OSLC	18	16	2	0	–	–	32	1st	22	18	4	0	.818	Won Semifinal, 8–5 (Royal Military College); Won Championship, 5–4 (Loyola)	Lost Quarterfinal, 2–4 (Laurentian); Lost Consolation Semifinal, 3–6 (St. Francis Xavier)
1967–68	OSLC	16	9	5	2	–	–	20	3rd	18	10	6	2	.611	Won Semifinal, 7–5 (Sherbrooke); Lost Championship, 2–6 (Loyola)	
1968–69	OSLC	18	9	8	1	–	–	19	4th	22	12	9	1	.568	Won Semifinal, 4–2 (Loyola); Won Championship, 3–2 (Bishop's)	Won Semifinal, 5–3 (Saint Mary's); Lost Championship, 2–4 (Toronto)
1969–70	OSLC	14	9	5	0	–	–	14	3rd	15	9	6	0	.600	Lost Semifinal, 2–5 (Sherbrooke)	
1970–71	OSLC	18	5	13	0	–	–	10	6th	18	5	13	0	.278		
1971–72	QUAA	21	13	6	2	–	–	28	2nd	25	15	8	2	.640	Won Semifinal, 6–3 (Sherbrooke); Won Championship, 1–0 (Loyola)	Lost Semifinal, 1–5 (Toronto); Lost Third Place Game, 2–5 (Alberta)
1972–73	QUAA	24	17	4	3	–	–	37	1st	28	17	10	1	.625	Won Semifinal, 9–4 (Sherbrooke); Lost Championship, 4–7 (Loyola)	
1973–74	QUAA	18	10	4	4	–	–	24	3rd	23	17	3	3	.804	Won Quarterfinal, 9–1 (Bishop's); Won Semifinal, 5–4 (Loyola); Won Championship series, 2–0 (Sherbrooke)	Won Semifinal series, 2–1 (Saint Mary's); Lost Championship, 6–5 (OT) (Waterloo)
1974–75	QUAA	20	8	9	3	–	–	19	3rd	23	9	11	3	.457	Won Semifinal, 6–4 (Quebec–Trois-Rivières); Lost Championship series, 0–2 (Loyola)	
Totals										GP	W	L	T/SOL	%	Championships	
Regular Season										236	143	76	17	.642	2 OSLC Championships, 1 QUAA Championships	
Conference Post-season										26	20	6	0	.769	6 OSLC Championships, 2 QUAA Championships	
U Sports Postseason										13	3	10	0	.231	7 National tournament appearances	
Regular Season and Postseason Record										275	166	92	17	.635		

Note: Totals include results from 1961–62 onward.

=== Concordia ===
Note: GP = Games played, W = Wins, L = Losses, T = Ties, OTL = Overtime Losses, SOL = Shootout Losses, Pts = Points

U Sports Champion	U Sports Semifinalist	Conference regular season champions	Conference Division Champions	Conference Playoff Champions

Season	Conference	Regular Season													Conference Tournament Results	National Tournament Results
Season	Conference	Conference								Overall					Conference Tournament Results	National Tournament Results
Season	Conference	GP	W	L	T	OTL	SOL	Pts*	Finish	GP	W	L	T	%	Conference Tournament Results	National Tournament Results
Paul Arsenault (1975–1989)
1975–76	QUAA	20	19	0	1	–	–	39	1st	28	26	1	1	.946	Won Semifinal series, 2–0 (Bishop's); Won Championship series, 2–0 (Laval)	Won Eastern Semifinal, 5–0 (Moncton); Won Eastern Final, 5–3 (St. Francis Xavier); Won First Round Game 1, 5–2 (Guelph); Lost Semifinal, 2–3 (Toronto)
1976–77	QUAA	20	17	2	1	–	–	35	1st	27	22	4	1	.833	Won Semifinal series, 2–0 (McGill); Won Championship series, 2–0 (Quebec–Trois-Rivières)	Lost Quarterfinal series, 1–2 (Saint Mary's)
1977–78	QUAA	16	12	4	0	–	–	24	1st	25	18	7	0	.720	Won Semifinal series, 2–0 (Bishop's); Won Championship series, 3–2 (Quebec–Trois-Rivières)	Lost Group II Round-Robin, 7–3 (Moncton), 3–7 (Toronto)
1978–79	QUAA	20	18	2	0	–	–	36	1st	27	24	3	0	.889	Won Semifinal series, 2–0 (McGill); Won Championship series, 3–0 (Quebec–Chicoutimi)	Lost Group I Round-Robin, 1–7 (Alberta), 8–3 (Regina)
1979–80	QUAA	23	15	6	2	–	–	32	2nd	29	19	8	2	.690	Won Semifinal series, 2–0 (Ottawa); Won Championship series, 2–0 (Quebec–Trois-Rivières)	Lost Group I Round-Robin, 3–4 (Alberta), 1–5 (Calgary)
1980–81	QUAA	24	22	1	1	–	–	45	1st	30	26	3	1	.883	Won Semifinal series, 2–0 (Quebec–Trois-Rivières); Won Championship series, 2–0 (Ottawa)	Lost Group II Round-Robin, 2–3 (Queen's), 3–8 (Saskatchewan)
1981–82	QUAA	24	21	2	1	–	–	43	1st	30	26	3	1	.883	Won Semifinal series, 2–0 (Laval); Won Championship series, 2–0 (Quebec–Trois-Rivières)	Lost Group I Round-Robin, 3–4 (Saskatchewan), 6–5 (Regina)
1982–83	QUAA	30	23	7	0	–	–	46	1st	39	29	9	1	.756	Won Semifinal series, 2–0 (Quebec–Trois-Rivières); Won Championship series, 3–1 (Quebec–Chicoutimi)	Won Group I Round-Robin, 3–1 (Toronto), 4–4 (Moncton); Lost Championship, 2–6 (Saskatchewan)
1983–84	QUAA	24	17	4	3	–	–	37	1st	33	24	5	4	.788	Won Semifinal series, 3–0 (Quebec–Chicoutimi); Won Championship series, 3–0 (Ottawa)	Won Semifinal series, 7–5 (Alberta); Lost Championship, 1–9 (Toronto)
1984–85	QUAA	19	4	13	2	–	–	10	5th	19	4	13	2	.263		
1985–86	QUAA	20	7	12	1	–	–	15	4th	23	8	14	1	.370	Lost Semifinal series, 1–2 (Quebec–Trois-Rivières)	
1986–87	QUAA	18	2	15	1	–	–	.139	4th	18	2	15	1	.139		
1987–88	OUAA	25	12	11	2	–	–	30	9th	28	13	13	2	.500	Lost Division Semifinal series, 1–2 (McGill)	
1988–89	OUAA	26	14	10	2	–	–	30	7th	28	14	12	2	.536	Lost Division Semifinal series, 0–2 (McGill)	
Yves Beaucage (1989–1999)
1989–90	OUAA	22	9	13	0	–	–	18	12th	22	9	13	0	.409		
1990–91	OUAA	22	15	7	0	–	–	30	3rd	24	15	9	0	.625	Lost Quarterfinal series, 0–2 (Toronto)	
1991–92	OUAA	22	8	12	2	–	–	18	11th	22	8	12	2	.409		
1992–93	OUAA	22	10	10	2	–	–	22	9th	23	10	11	2	.478	Lost First Round, 2–3 (McGill)	
1993–94	OUAA	24	15	8	1	–	–	31	5th	25	15	9	1	.620	Lost Division Semifinal, 1–6 (Quebec–Trois-Rivières)	
1994–95	OUAA	24	11	9	4	–	–	26	8th	25	11	10	4	.520	Lost Division Semifinal, 1–3 (McGill)	
1995–96	OUAA	26	7	19	0	–	–	14	14th	26	7	19	0	.269		
1996–97	OUAA	26	11	13	2	–	–	24	11th	26	11	13	2	.462		
1997–98	OUA	26	13	11	2	–	–	28	T–6th	32	15	15	2	.500	Won Division Semifinal series, 2–1 (McGill); Lost Division Final series, 0–3 (Quebec–Trois-Rivières)	
1998–99	OUA	26	16	7	3	–	–	35	3rd	30	18	9	3	.650	Won Division Semifinal series, 2–0 (Ottawa); Lost Division Final series, 0–2 (Quebec–Trois-Rivières)	
Kevin Figsby (1999–2015)
1999–00	OUA	26	14	9	3	–	–	31	4th	28	14	11	3	.554	Lost Division Semifinal series, 0–2 (McGill)	
2000–01	OUA	24	10	9	5	–	–	25	6th	28	12	11	5	.518	Won Division Semifinal series, 2–0 (McGill); Lost Division Final series, 0–2 (Quebec–Trois-Rivières)	
2001–02	OUA	24	11	12	1	–	–	23	T–8th	24	11	12	1	.479		
2002–03	OUA	24	9	13	2	–	–	34	9th	24	9	13	2	.417		
2003–04	OUA	24	11	10	3	0	–	25	8th	26	11	12	3	.481	Lost Division Quarterfinal series, 0–2 (Quebec–Trois-Rivières)	
2004–05	OUA	24	14	8	1	1	–	30	T–5th	27	15	11	1	.574	Lost Division Quarterfinal series, 1–2 (Ottawa)	
2005–06	OUA	24	7	11	3	3	–	20	10th	27	8	16	3	.352	Lost Division Quarterfinal series, 1–2 (Ottawa)	
2006–07	OUA	28	8	16	3	1	–	20	13th	31	9	19	3	.339	Lost Division Quarterfinal series, 1–2 (McGill)	
2007–08	OUA	28	11	14	–	2	1	25	14th	28	11	16	1	.411		
2008–09	OUA	28	14	12	–	0	2	30	T–9th	31	15	14	2	.516	Lost Division Quarterfinal series, 1–2 (Carleton)	
2009–10	OUA	28	8	16	–	1	3	20	T–16th	30	8	19	3	.317	Lost Division Quarterfinal series, 0–2 (Quebec–Trois-Rivières)	
2010–11	OUA	28	12	14	–	2	0	26	15th	31	13	18	0	.419	Lost Division Quarterfinal series, 1–2 (Quebec–Trois-Rivières)	
2011–12	OUA	28	13	13	–	1	1	28	T–13th	28	13	14	1	.482		
2012–13	OUA	28	8	15	–	2	3	21	18th	28	8	17	3	.339		
2013–14	OUA	28	11	13	–	2	2	26	15th	30	11	17	2	.400	Lost Division Quarterfinal series, 0–2 (McGill)	
2014–15	OUA	26	8	17	–	1	0	27	18th	29	9	20	0	.310	Lost Division Quarterfinal series, 1–2 (McGill)	
Marc-André Element (2015–Present)
2015–16	OUA	28	10	12	–	6	0	26	14th	30	10	20	0	.333	Lost Division Quarterfinal series, 0–2 (McGill)	
2016–17	OUA	28	19	7	–	2	0	40	T–3rd	34	22	12	0	.647	Won Division Quarterfinal series, 2–1 (Ontario Tech); Lost Division Semifinal series, 1–2 (Queen's)	
2017–18	OUA	28	18	7	–	2	1	39	4th	38	24	13	1	.645	Won Division Quarterfinal series, 2–0 (Ontario Tech); Won Division Semifinal series, 2–1 (Queen's); Lost Division Final series, 1–2 (McGill); Won Bronze Medal Game, 3–2 (York)	Lost Quarterfinal, 1–8 (New Brunswick)
2018–19	OUA	28	15	11	–	1	1	32	9th	30	15	14	1	.517	Lost Division Quarterfinal series, 0–2 (McGill)	
2019–20	OUA	28	13	10	–	5	0	31	9th	36	17	19	0	.472	Won Division Quarterfinal series, 2–1 (McGill); Won Division Semifinal series, 2–0 (Carleton); Lost Division Final series, 0–2 (Ottawa); Lost Bronze Medal Game, 2–5 (Western Ontario)	
2020–21	Season cancelled due to COVID-19 pandemic															
2021–22	OUA	15	9	5	–	0	1	.633	5th	16	9	6	1	.594	Lost Division Quarterfinal, 4–6 (Ontario Tech)	
2022–23	OUA	26	19	7	–	0	0	38	4th	32	23	9	0	.719	Won Division Semifinal series, 2–0 (McGill); Lost Division Final series, 1–2 (Quebec–Trois-Rivières); Won Bronze Medal Game, 4–0 (Lakehead)	Lost Quarterfinal, 1–2 (New Brunswick)
2023–24	OUA	28	17	8	–	3	0	37	8th	32	19	13	0	.594	Won Division Quarterfinal series, 2–0 (Queen's); Lost Division Semifinal series, 0–2 (McGill)	
Totals										GP	W	L	T/SOL	%	Championships	
Regular Season										1180	610	501	69	.546	8 QUAA Championships	
Conference Post-season										132	71	61	0	.538	9 QUAA Championships	
U Sports Postseason										25	9	14	2	.400	11 National tournament appearances	
Regular Season and Postseason Record										1337	690	576	71	.543		

== See also ==
Concordia Stingers women's ice hockey
