= Army–Royal Military College men's ice hockey rivalry =

International ice hockey rivalry

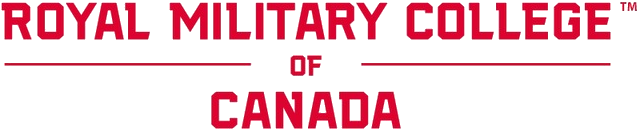
- Army Black Knights RMC Paladins
- Sport: Ice hockey
- First meeting: 23 February 1923; RMC 3, Army 0
- Latest meeting: 11 October 2026; Army 6, RMC 1
- Next meeting: TBA
- Trophy: Challenge Trophy

Statistics
- Total meetings: 87
- All-time series: Army leads, 50–30–7 (.615)
- Largest victory: Army, 11–1 (26 January 1991)
- Longest win streak: RMC, 11
- Longest unbeaten streak: RMC, 15 (2 February 1923 – 5 March 1938)

The Army–Royal Military College men's ice hockey rivalry is a college ice hockey rivalry between the Army Black Knights men's ice hockey and RMC Paladins men's ice hockey programs. The first meeting between the two occurred on 2 February 1923 and was largely recurring afterwards.

== History ==
Both RMC and Army were earlier adopters of ice hockey programs in their respective countries. After World War I, the first conflict that included both Canada and the United States on the same side, the two academies were looking to strengthen ties to one another. In 1921, Brig. Gen. Douglas MacArthur wrote a letter to Maj. Gen. Sir Archibald Macdonell, suggesting the two institutions arrange a meeting between their respective ice hockey teams. Two years later the details were finalized and RMC travelled to West Point for the inaugural meeting. The match was held on Stuart Rink a natural, seasonal surface and kicked off a rivalry between the two schools that has endured for over a century.

In the first 15 years of the annual rivalry, RMC held the distinct advantage, going 14–0–1 from 1923 to 1938. Army was able to earn its first victory in 1939 but then the series was suspended during World War II (RMC did not field a team during the war except for a single game against Army in 1942). When the Reds returned in 1949, Army found itself as the better of the two and closed the gap in the series record. RMC would not win back-to-back games until the early 1980s but that stretch was fleeting for the Paladins. Army put together several winning streaks over the years and eventually took the lead in the series in the 1990s. The series was halted after 2006 and did not resume until 2011. Upon its return, Army won eight consecutive matches, their longest streak to date, before RMC stopped the run in 2020. From 2021 through 2023, the annual games were cancelled in large part due to the COVID-19 pandemic but the two finally resumed the series in 2024. The 2026 game,scheduled in January was cancelled due to weather conditions. A game was instead held in October 2026.

In 2026, Army coach Zach McKelvie expressed concerns that new NCAA rules restricting travel to Canada could put the future of the annual game in jeopardy.

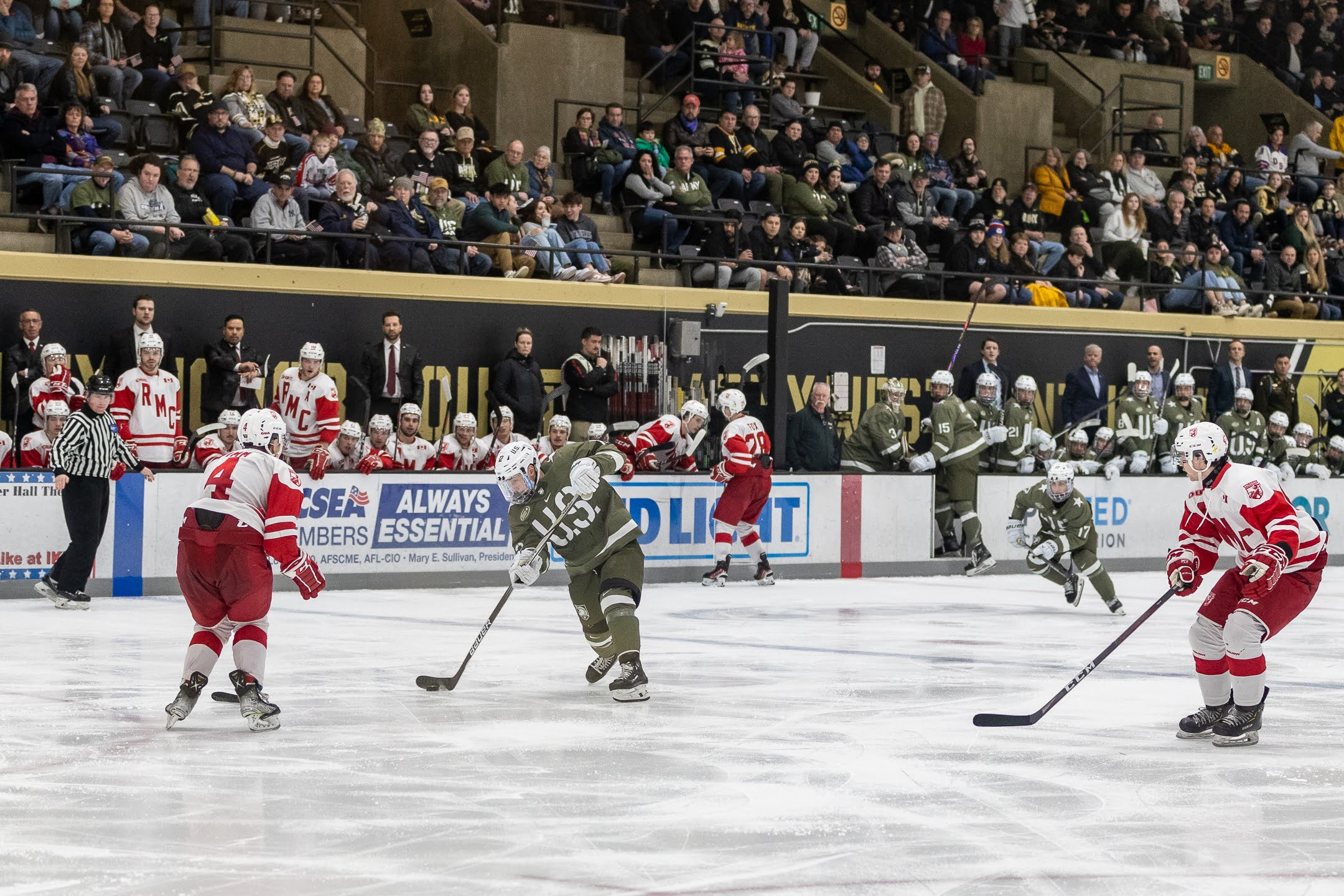
A game between the two teams at Tate Rink in 2024

== Game results ==
Full game results for the rivalry, with rankings beginning in the 1998–99 season.

Army victories	RMC victories	Tie games

No.	Date	Location	Winning team		Losing team		Notes
1	23 February 1923	West Point, NY	RMC	3	Army	0	
2	16 February 1924	Kingston, ON	RMC	10	Army	5	
3	22 February 1925	West Point, NY	RMC	5	Army	0	
4	19 February 1927	Kingston, ON	RMC	7	Army	2	
5	18 February 1928	West Point, NY	RMC	8	Army	3	
6	23 February 1929	Kingston, ON	RMC	8	Army	3	
7	22 February 1930	West Point, NY	RMC	5	Army	3	
8	7 March 1931	Kingston, ON	RMC	7	Army	5	
9	5 March 1932	West Point, NY	RMC	7	Army	1	
10	25 February 1933	Kingston, ON	RMC	3	Army	1	
11	February 1934	West Point, NY	RMC	6	Army	4	
12	2 March 1935	Kingston, ON	Tie	4	Tie	4	
13	March 1936	West Point, NY	RMC	5	Army	2	
14	6 March 1937	Kingston, ON	RMC	4	Army	1	
15	5 March 1938	West Point, NY	RMC	1	Army	0	
16	4 March 1939	Kingston, ON	Army	3	RMC	2	
17	5 March 1942	West Point, NY	Army	3	RMC	1	
18	1949	West Point, NY	Army	5	RMC	4	
19	11 March 1950	Kingston, ON	RMC	6	Army	4	
20	3 March 1951	West Point, NY	Army	4	RMC	2	
21	1 March 1952	Kingston, ON	RMC	7	Army	4	
22	7 March 1953	West Point, NY	Army	5	RMC	4	
23	6 March 1954	Kingston, ON	Army	5	RMC	3	
24	5 March 1955	West Point, NY	RMC	3	Army	2	(OT)
25	10 March 1956	Kingston, ON	Army	3	RMC	2	
26	9 March 1957	West Point, NY	Army	7	RMC	2	
27	8 March 1958	Kingston, ON	Army	5	RMC	1	
28	7 March 1959	West Point, NY	RMC	6	Army	1	
29	5 March 1960	Kingston, ON	Army	7	RMC	5	
30	4 March 1961	West Point, NY	Army	7	RMC	1	
31	3 March 1962	Kingston, ON	Army	3	RMC	2	
32	2 March 1963	West Point, NY	Army	9	RMC	4	
33	7 March 1964	Kingston, ON	RMC	4	Army	2	
34	6 March 1965	West Point, NY	Army	6	RMC	0	
35	5 March 1966	Kingston, ON	RMC	8	Army	3	
36	4 March 1967	West Point, NY	Army	9	RMC	1	
37	9 March 1968	Kingston, ON	Army	4	RMC	2	
38	8 March 1969	West Point, NY	Army	5	RMC	2	
39	7 March 1970	Kingston, ON	Army	3	RMC	2	
40	6 March 1971	West Point, NY	Army	6	RMC	0	
41	11 March 1972	Kingston, ON	RMC	7	Army	4	
42	10 March 1973	West Point, NY	Tie	4	Tie	4	
43	2 March 1974	Kingston, ON	Tie	4	Tie	4	
44	8 March 1975	West Point, NY	Army	2	RMC	1	
45	13 March 1976	Kingston, ON	Tie	4	Tie	4	
46	12 March 1977	West Point, NY	Army	11	RMC	2	
47	18 February 1978	Kingston, ON	RMC	7	Army	6	
48	27 January 1979	West Point, NY	Army	12	RMC	4	
49	26 January 1980	Kingston, ON	RMC	5	Army	2	
50	21 February 1981	West Point, NY	Army	10	RMC	5	
51	6 February 1982	Kingston, ON	RMC	4	Army	3	
52	19 February 1983	West Point, NY	RMC	3	Army	2	
53	18 February 1984	Kingston, ON	RMC	8	Army	5	
54	9 February 1985	West Point, NY	Army	6	RMC	4	
55	25 January 1986	Kingston, ON	Army	9	RMC	7	
56	24 January 1987	West Point, NY	RMC	4	Army	3	
57	23 January 1988	Kingston, ON	Army	4	RMC	3	
58	21 January 1989	West Point, NY	Army	3	RMC	2	(OT)
59	20 January 1990	Kingston, ON	Tie	3	Tie	3	(OT)
60	26 January 1991	West Point, NY	Army	11	RMC	1	
61	25 January 1992	Kingston, ON	Army	3	RMC	2	
62	6 February 1993	West Point, NY	Army	6	RMC	2	
63	12 February 1994	Kingston, ON	Army	6	RMC	0	
64	11 February 1995	West Point, NY	Army	6	RMC	1	
65	10 February 1996	Kingston, ON	Army	2	RMC	0	
66	8 February 1997	West Point, NY	Army	7	RMC	3	
67	7 February 1998	Kingston, ON	Tie	2	Tie	2	(OT)
68	6 February 1999	West Point, NY	Army	3	RMC	1	
69	12 February 2000	Kingston, ON	RMC	3	Army	0	
70	10 February 2001	West Point, NY	Army	7	RMC	1	
71	9 February 2002	Kingston, ON	RMC	3	Army	2	(OT)
72	8 February 2003	West Point, NY	Army	4	RMC	0	
73	7 February 2004	Kingston, ON	Army	3	RMC	2	
74	5 February 2005	West Point, NY	Army	6	RMC	1	
75	11 February 2006	Kingston, ON	Tie	3	Tie	3	(OT)
76	4 February 2011	West Point, NY	Army	9	RMC	1	
77	26 January 2013	West Point, NY	Army	4	RMC	1	
78	25 January 2014	Kingston, ON	Army	5	RMC	2	
79	24 January 2015	West Point, NY	Army	8	RMC	0	
80	23 January 2016	Kingston, ON	Army	4	RMC	3	
81	21 January 2017	West Point, NY	Army	5	RMC	3	
82	20 January 2018	Kingston, ON	Army	5	RMC	0	
83	19 January 2019	West Point, NY	Army	5	RMC	2	
84	18 January 2020	Kingston, ON	RMC	3	Army	2	(OT)
85	7 January 2024	West Point, NY	Army	6	RMC	1	
86	1 February 2025	Kingston, ON	Army	3	RMC	2	
87	11 October 2026	West Point, NY	Army	6	RMC	1	
Series: Army leads 50–30–7

== Series facts ==
Statistic	Army	RMC
Games played	87	
Wins	50	30
Home wins	31	18
Road wins	19	12
Neutral site wins	0	0
Most goals scored in a game by one team	12 (27 January 1979)	10 (16 February 1924)
Most goals in a game by both teams	16 (27 January 1979 – Army 12, RMC 4; 25 January 1986 – Army 9, RMC 7)	
Fewest goals in a game by both teams	1 (5 March 1938)	
Fewest goals scored in a game by one team in a win	2 (8 March 1975, 10 February 1996)	1 (5 March 1938)
Most goals scored in a game by one team in a loss	6 (18 February 1978)	7 (25 January 1986)
Largest margin of victory	10 (26 January 1991)	6 (5 March 1932)
Longest winning streak	8 (4 February 2011 – 19 January 2019),	11 (23 February 1923 – February 1934),
Longest unbeaten streak	12 (23 January 1988 – 6 February 1999) (8 February 2003 – 19 January 2019)	15 (23 February 1923 – 5 March 1938)
