= Sherbrooke Vert et Or men's ice hockey =

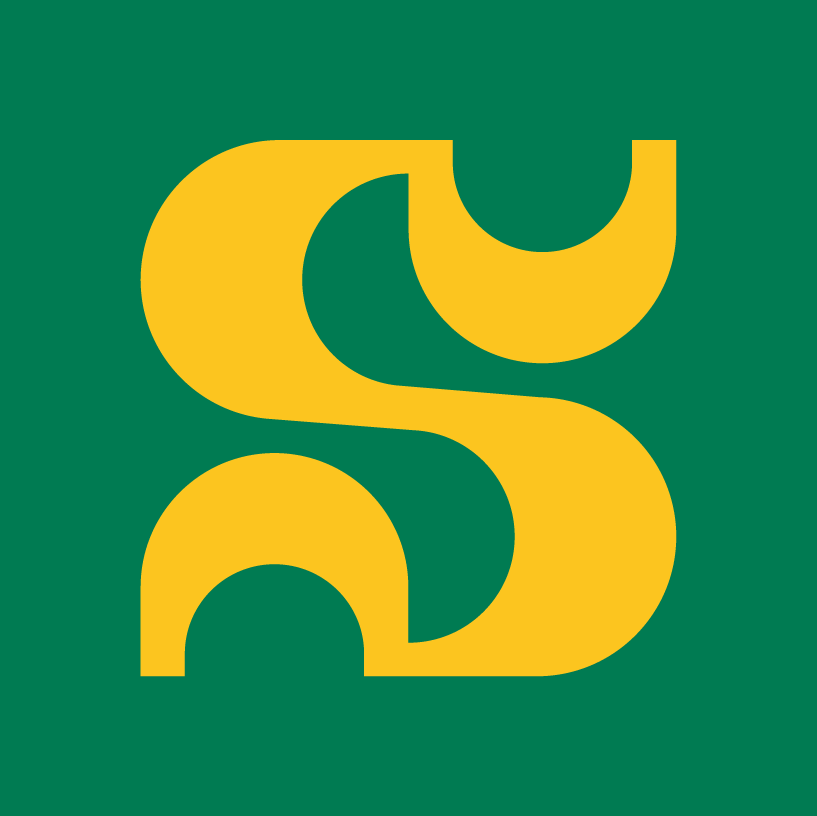
- University: Université de Sherbrooke
- Arena: Sherbrooke, Quebec
- Colors: Vert et Or (Green and Gold)

U Sports tournament appearances
- 1963

Conference tournament champions
- 1963

The Sherbrooke Vert et Or men's ice hockey team was a varsity ice hockey team representing the Sherbrooke Vert et Or athletic department of the Université de Sherbrooke. The team played for twelve seasons and was discontinued in 1974.

== History ==
Sherbrooke fielded its first ice hockey team just in time to compete for the inaugural University Cup. Despite being a new program, the Vert et Or finished in a tie for second place in the Ottawa–St. Lawerence Conference (OSLC) and then proceeded to win a pair of 1-goal playoff games to capture the league championship. The debutant club was among the four teams invited to take part in the national tournament but they could not quite hold up to their opponents, finishing fourth in the series.

It took the team five years to return to the conference postseason but they were never able to recapture the magic of that first season. The Vert et Or made two subsequent league championship appearances but could not win either. The second of those opportunities came in 1974 and was the final match the team as the school decided to discontinue the program in the offseason.

In 2026, the University announced that the hockey program will make a comeback in Fall of the same year. The activities will take place at the Thibault GM Sports Complex nearby the campus.

== Season-by-season results ==
Note: GP = Games played, W = Wins, L = Losses, T = Ties, OTL = Overtime Losses, SOL = Shootout Losses, Pts = Points

U Sports Champion	U Sports Semifinalist	Conference regular season champions	Conference Division Champions	Conference Playoff Champions

Season	Conference	Regular Season													Conference Tournament Results	National Tournament Results
Season	Conference	Conference								Overall					Conference Tournament Results	National Tournament Results
Season	Conference	GP	W	L	T	OTL	SOL	Pts*	Finish	GP	W	L	T	%	Conference Tournament Results	National Tournament Results
1962–63	OSLC	14	11	3	0	–	–	22	T–2nd	18	13	5	0	.722	Won Semifinal, 5–4 (Royal Military College); Won Championship, 6–5 (Ottawa)	Lost Semifinal, 2–6 (British Columbia); Lost Third Place Game, 4–7 (St. Francis Xavier)
1963–64	OSLC	14	5	9	0	–	–	10	6th	14	5	9	0	.357		
1964–65	OSLC	14	3	11	0	–	–	6	T–7th	14	3	11	0	.214		
1965–66	OSLC	16	2	14	0	–	–	4	9th	16	2	14	0	.125		
1966–67	OSLC	18	7	11	0	–	–	14	6th	18	7	11	0	.389		
1967–68	OSLC	16	11	4	1	–	–	23	2nd	17	11	5	1	.676	Lost Semifinal, 5–7 (Sir George Williams)	
1968–69	OSLC	18	10	7	1	–	–	21	T–2nd	19	10	8	1	.553	Lost Semifinal, 4–5 (Bishop's)	
1969–70	OSLC	14	11	1	2	–	–	24	2nd	16	12	2	2	.813	Won Semifinal, 5–2 (Sir George Williams); Lost Championship, 1–2 (Loyola)	
1970–71	OSLC	18	10	7	1	–	–	21	4th	19	10	8	1	.553	Lost Semifinal, 3–10 (Loyola)	
1971–72	QUAA	21	12	6	3	–	–	27	3rd	22	12	7	3	.614	Lost Semifinal, 3–6 (Sir George Williams)	
1972–73	QUAA	24	12	9	3	–	–	27	4th	25	12	10	3	.540	Lost Semifinal, 4–9 (Sir George Williams)	
1973–74	QUAA	18	6	9	3	–	–	15	4th	22	8	11	3	.432	Won Quarterfinal, 6–5 (McGill); Won Semifinal, 8–5 (Quebec–Trois-Rivières); Lost Championship series, 0–2 (Sir George Williams)	
program suspended
Totals										GP	W	L	T/SOL	%	Championships	
Regular Season										207	100	91	16	.522		
Conference Post-season										13	5	8	0	.385	1 OSLC Championship	
U Sports Postseason										2	0	2	0	.000	1 national tournament appearance	
Regular Season and Postseason Record										222	105	101	16	.509		

Note: Totals include senior collegiate play only.
