= 1910 Allan Cup =

Canadian senior ice hockey championship

The Allan Cup trophy

The 1910 Allan Cup was the Canadian senior ice hockey championship for the 1909–10 season. The Allan Cup title was held by Queen's Golden Gaels and the Toronto St. Michael's Majors. Queen's won its league and a challenge before losing to Toronto, who successfully defended the title against Sherbrooke.

== OUA Finals ==
For the right to accept challenge from the champions of other leagues, the 1909 Allan Cup champions from Queen's University had to win the Ontario University Athletics final, or the winner would carry on for them. Played in Ottawa, Ontario.

- Queen's University (Allan Cup holder)
- McGill University (Challenger)

=== Results ===
Queen's 7 - McGill 2

Queen's University carries the Allan Cup.

== First challenge ==
First challenge game for Cup this year is Ottawa Cliffsides vs Queen's (at Kingston) on March 12, 1910, won by Queen's 6-3.

=== Result ===
Queen's University 6 - Ottawa Cliffsides 3

Queen's University is Allan Cup champion.

== Second challenge ==
Queen's University received a challenge from the Toronto St. Michael's Majors of the OHA Senior Hockey League. Played in Kingston, Ontario.

- Queen's University (Allan Cup holder)
- Toronto St. Michael's Majors (Challenger)

=== Results ===
Toronto St. Michael's Majors 5 - Queen's University 4

Toronto St. Michael's Majors becomes second Allan Cup champion for 1910.

== Third challenge ==
Toronto St. Michael's Majors received a challenge from Sherbrooke of the St. Lawrence Hockey League. Played in Toronto, Ontario.

- Toronto St. Michael's Majors (Allan Cup holder)
- Sherbrooke (Challenger)

=== Results ===
Toronto St. Michael's Majors 8 - Sherbrooke 3

Toronto carries the Allan Cup.

With no more challengers accepted in time to play, the Majors are co-winners of the 1910 Allan Cup along with Queen's as winner of its league and challenge winner.
