= RMC Paladins men's ice hockey =

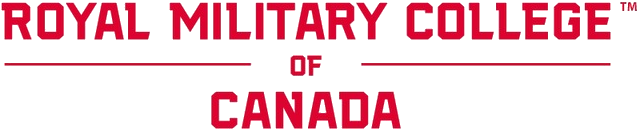
- University: Royal Military College of Canada
- Conference: OUA; OUA East Division
- Head coach: Richard Lim; Since 2015–16 season
- Assistant coaches: Eric Lalonde; Doug Cameron; Gary Marino; Matthew Beirnes; Liam Murray
- Arena: Constantine Arena; Kingston, Ontario
- Colors: Red, White, and Red

The RMC Paladins men's ice hockey team is an ice hockey team representing the Royal Military College Paladins athletics program of Royal Military College of Canada. The team is a member of the Ontario University Athletics conference and compete in U Sports. The Paladins play their home games at the Constantine Arena in Kingston, Ontario.

== History ==
The ice hockey team at RMC can trace its origin back to 1886 when it took part in the first game ever played in Ontario.

=== Rivalries ===
In 1886, a group of cadets from RMC met a team made of undergraduates from Queen's and the two played their first ice hockey game in Kingston harbor. That began the world's oldest ice hockey rivalry. On the 100th anniversary of that match, the Carr-Harris Cup was conferred by the International Hockey Hall of Fame and has been awarded to the winner ever since.

RMC is also responsible for the oldest international ice hockey rivalry with its battles against the United States Military Academy (Army) dating back to 1923. There have been two gaps in play, as well as a few cancelled matches over the years but the series has remained in place with the two facing off once per year. RMC held the advantage in the early years, winning the first 11 meetings, however, since World War II, the series has been dominated by Army.

== Season-by-season results ==
=== Senior and collegiate play ===
Note: GP = Games played, W = Wins, L = Losses, T = Ties, Pts = Points

Extra-League Champion	U Sports Semifinalist	Conference regular season champions	Conference Division Champions	Conference Playoff Champions

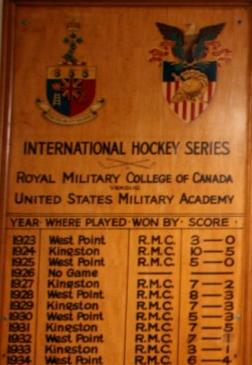
West Point series plaque, RMC vs USMA, Currie Hall, RMC

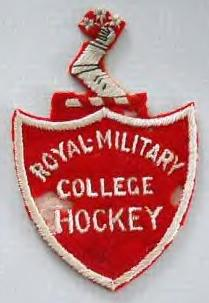
Royal Military College of Canada hockey flash

Season	Conference	Regular Season											Conference Tournament Results	National Tournament Results
Season	Conference	Conference						Overall					Conference Tournament Results	National Tournament Results
Season	Conference	GP	W	L	T	Pts*	Finish	GP	W	L	T	%	Conference Tournament Results	National Tournament Results
Senior Hockey
1890–91	OHA	?	?	?	?	?	?	?	?	?	?	?		
1891–92	OHA	?	?	?	?	?	?	?	?	?	?	?	Lost First Round, 1–9 (Queen's)	
1892–93	OHA	2	0	2	0	0	?	?	?	?	?	?		
1893–94	OHA	2	0	2	0	0	?	?	?	?	?	?		
1894–95	OHA	4	0	4	0	0	?	?	?	?	?	?		
1895–96	OHA	?	?	?	?	?	?	?	?	?	?	?		
1896–97	OHA	2	0	2	0	0	–	?	?	?	?	?		
1897–98	OHA	0	0	0	0	0	–	?	?	?	?	?	Lost Quarterfinal series, 6–32 (Queen's)	
1898–99	OHA	2	0	2	0	0	?	?	?	?	?	?		
1899–00	OHA	0	0	0	0	0	–	?	?	?	?	?	Lost Group Final series, 5–19 (Queen's)	
1900–01	OHAI	2	0	2	0	0	–	?	?	?	?	?		
1901–02	OHAI	2	2	0	0	4	1st	?	?	?	?	?	Lost First Round series, 3–17 (Peterborough)	
Senior and Collegiate Hockey
1902–03	IIS	0	0	0	0	0	–	?	?	?	?	?	Won Eastern Final series, 5–2 (Queen's II); Won Championship series, 22–4 (Toronto II)	
1903–04	IIS	0	0	0	0	0	–	?	?	?	?	?	Won Semifinal series, 19–2 (Queen's II); Won Championship series, 19–16 (McMaster)	
1904–05	IIS	0	0	0	0	0	–	?	?	?	?	?	Won Semifinal series, 6–5 (Queen's II); Lost Championship series, 11–16 (Toronto II)	
1905–06	IIS	0	0	0	0	0	–	?	?	?	?	?	results missing	
1906–07	IIS	0	0	0	0	0	–	?	?	?	?	?	Won Semifinal series, 16–8 (Queen's II); Lost Championship series, 13–17 (Toronto II)	
1907–08	IIS	0	0	0	0	0	–	?	?	?	?	?	Lost Semifinal series, 7–16 (Queen's II)	
1908–09	IIS	0	0	0	0	0	–	?	?	?	?	?	Lost Central series, 14–16 (Queen's II)	
1909–10	IIS	0	0	0	0	0	–	?	?	?	?	?	Won Central, ? (Queen's II); Won Semifinal, 18–15 (McGill II); Lost Championship series, ? (Toronto II)	
1910–11	IIS	0	0	0	0	0	–	?	?	?	?	?	Lost Central, 12–15 (Queen's II)	
1911–12	IIS	0	0	0	0	0	–	?	?	?	?	?	Won Semifinal series, 14–7 (McGill II); Won Championship series, 12–7 (McMaster)	
1912–13	IIS	0	0	0	0	0	–	?	?	?	?	?	Won Central, 13–4 (Queen's II); Won Semifinal, 7–4 (McGill II); Won Championship series, 17–7 (McMaster)	
1913–14	IIS	0	0	0	0	0	–	?	?	?	?	?	Won Semifinal series, 9–5 (Queen's II); Won Championship series, 8–6 (Toronto II)	
Program suspended
1919–20	IIS	2	1	1	0	2	–	?	?	?	?	?	Won Championship series, 13–10 (Toronto II)	
1920–21	IIS	?	?	?	?	?	?	?	?	?	?	?		
1921–22	IIS	0	0	0	0	0	–	?	?	?	?	?	Lost Semifinal series, 7–9 (Queen's II)	
1922–23	IIS	0	0	0	0	0	–	?	?	?	?	?	Lost Semifinal series, 7–9 (Queen's II)	
1923–24	IIS	0	0	0	0	0	–	?	?	?	?	?	Won Semifinal series, 15–8 (Queen's II); Lost Championship series, 9–12 (Osgoode Hall)	
1924–25	IIS	0	0	0	0	0	–	?	?	?	?	?	Won Central, 5–0 (Queen's II); Lost Semifinal, 1–2 (McGill II)	
1925–26	IIS	2	2	0	0	4	–	?	?	?	?	?	Won Semifinal, 3–1 (Bishop's); Won Championship series, 6–2 (McMaster)	
1926–27	IIS	2	1	1	0	2	–	?	?	?	?	?	Won Championship series, 3–2 (Western Ontario)	
1926–27	OHA	10	3	7	0	6	?	?	?	?	?	?		
1927–28	IIS	2	1	1	0	2	–	?	?	?	?	?	Lost Semifinal series, 5–8 (Loyola)	
1927–28	OHA	10	5	5	0	10	?	?	?	?	?	?		
1928–29	IIS	2	0	2	0	0	–	?	?	?	?	?		
1928–29	OHA	4	2	2	0	4	?	?	?	?	?	?		
1929–30	OHA	4	4	0	0	8	1st	?	?	?	?	?	Won First Round series, 9–7 (Bowmanville); Won Second Round series, 11–8 (Peterborough); Lost Semifinal, 4–5 (Walkerton)	
1930–31	OHA	4	3	1	0	8	?	?	?	?	?	?	Won Group A Final series series, 8–3 (Gananoque); Won Group 1 Final series, 14–6 (Belleville); Won Quarterfinal series, 18–4 (Markham); Won Semifinal series, 6–5 (Camp Borden); Won Championship series, 4–3 (Chatham)	Lost Allan Cup First Round, 3–8 (Sudbury Wolves)
1931–32	IIS	3	1	2	0	4	?	?	?	?	?	?		
1932–33	IIS	4	1	3	0	2	–	?	?	?	?	?		
1932–33	OHA	6	2	4	0	4	?	?	?	?	?	?		
1933–34	IIS	3	0	3	0	0	–	?	?	?	?	?		
1933–34	OHA	5	0	5	0	0	?	?	?	?	?	?		
1934–35	IIS	0	0	0	0	0	–	?	?	?	?	?	Won Central, 4–2 (Queen's II); Won Championship series, 5–3 (Loyola)	
1935–36	IIS	6	3	2	1	11	2nd	?	?	?	?	?		
1936–37	IIS	5	3	2	0	8	2nd	?	?	?	?	?		
1936–37	OHA	8	1	5	2	4	?	?	?	?	?	?		
1937–38	IIS	6	1	5	0	4	T–6th	?	?	?	?	?		
1937–38	OHA	5	2	3	0	4	?	?	?	?	?	?		
1938–39	IIS	5	2	3	0	6	T–5th	?	?	?	?	?		
1938–39	OHA	4	2	2	0	8	?	?	?	?	?	?	Lost Group 1 Final series, 4–6 (Kingston)	
Program suspended due to World War II
Totals								GP	W	L	T	%	Championships	
Regular Season								?	?	?	?	?	2 OHA Group Championships, 1 OHA Championship	
Conference Post-season								?	?	?	?	?	9 IIS Championship, 1 OHA Championship	
Regular Season and Postseason Record								?	?	?	?	?		

=== Collegiate only ===
Note: GP = Games played, W = Wins, L = Losses, T = Ties, OTL = Overtime Losses, SOL = Shootout Losses, Pts = Points

U Sports Champion	U Sports Semifinalist	Conference regular season champions	Conference Division Champions	Conference Playoff Champions

Season	Conference	Regular Season													Conference Tournament Results	National Tournament Results
Season	Conference	Conference								Overall					Conference Tournament Results	National Tournament Results
Season	Conference	GP	W	L	T	OTL	SOL	Pts*	Finish	GP	W	L	T	%	Conference Tournament Results	National Tournament Results
Intermediate level
1949–50	OSLC	?	?	?	?	–	–	?	?	?	?	?	?	?		
1950–51	OSLC	6	4	2	0	–	–	8	3rd	6	4	2	0	.667		
1951–52	OSLC	7	2	4	1	–	–	5	4th	6	4	2	0	.357		
1952–53	OSLC	6	3	2	1	–	–	7	4th	6	3	2	1	.583		
1953–54	OSLC	7	4	2	1	–	–	9	3rd	7	4	2	1	.643		
1954–55	OSLC	4	2	2	0	–	–	4	3rd	4	2	2	0	.500		
1955–56	OSLC	7	2	4	1	–	–	5	4th	7	2	4	1	.357		
1956–57	OSLC	?	?	?	?	–	–	?	?	?	?	?	?	?		
1957–58	OSLC	?	?	?	?	–	–	?	?	?	?	?	?	?		
1958–59	OSLC	?	?	?	?	–	–	?	?	?	?	?	?	?		
1959–60	OSLC	10	0	10	0	–	–	0	6th	10	0	10	0	.000		
1960–61	OSLC	?	?	?	?	–	–	?	?	?	?	?	?	?		
Senior level
1961–62	OSLC	10	2	8	0	–	–	4	T–7th	10	2	8	0	.200		
1962–63	OSLC	14	11	3	0	–	–	22	T–2nd	15	11	4	0	.733	Lost Semifinal, 4–5 (Sherbrooke)	
1963–64	OSLC	14	8	2	4	–	–	20	1st	16	9	3	4	.688	Won Semifinal, 6–4 (Loyola); Lost Championship, 2–5 (Sir George Williams)	
1964–65	OSLC	14	9	4	1	–	–	19	3rd	14	9	4	1	.679		
1965–66	OSLC	16	8	6	2	–	–	18	4th	17	8	7	2	.529	Lost Semifinal, 4–5 (Sir George Williams)	
1966–67	OSLC	18	11	6	1	–	–	23	4th	20	11	8	1	.575	Lost Semifinal, 5–8 (Sir George Williams)	
1967–68	OSLC	16	5	9	2	–	–	12	6th	16	5	9	2	.375		
1968–69	OSLC	18	6	12	0	–	–	12	6th	18	6	12	0	.333		
1969–70	OSLC	14	6	7	1	–	–	13	5th	14	6	7	1	.464		
1970–71	OSLC	18	8	9	1	–	–	17	5th	18	8	9	1	.472		
1971–72	QUAA	21	4	15	2	–	–	10	7th	21	4	15	2	.238		
1972–73	QUAA	24	9	12	3	–	–	21	5th	24	9	12	3	.438		
1973–74	OUAA	18	3	12	3	–	–	9	13th	18	3	12	3	.250		
1974–75	OUAA	14	2	11	1	–	–	5	11th	14	2	11	1	.179		
1975–76	OUAA	12	6	5	1	–	–	13	8th	12	6	5	1	.542		
1976–77	OUAA	15	1	13	1	–	–	3	15th	15	1	13	1	.100		
1977–78	OUAA	15	2	13	0	–	–	4	15th	15	2	13	0	.133		
1978–79	Independent	–	–	–	–	–	–	–	–	?	?	?	?	?		
1979–80	Independent	–	–	–	–	–	–	–	–	?	?	?	?	?		
1980–81	Independent	–	–	–	–	–	–	–	–	?	?	?	?	?		
1981–82	Independent	–	–	–	–	–	–	–	–	?	?	?	?	?		
1982–83	OUAA	24	3	21	0	–	–	6	T–11th	24	3	21	0	.125		
1983–84	OUAA	24	5	14	5	–	–	15	T–11th	24	5	14	5	.313		
1984–85	OUAA	24	5	15	4	–	–	14	T–10th	24	5	15	4	.292		
1985–86	OUAA	24	5	19	0	–	–	10	13th	24	5	19	0	.208		
1986–87	OUAA	24	6	17	1	–	–	13	T–10th	24	6	17	1	.271		
1987–88	OUAA	25	3	20	2	–	–	8	16th	25	3	20	2	.160		
1988–89	OUAA	26	2	22	2	–	–	6	16th	26	2	22	2	.115		
1989–90	OUAA	22	2	20	0	–	–	4	16th	22	2	20	0	.091		
1990–91	OUAA	22	1	21	0	–	–	2	16th	22	1	21	0	.045		
1991–92	OUAA	22	2	20	0	–	–	2	15th	22	2	20	0	.091		
1992–93	OUAA	22	0	22	0	–	–	0	16th	22	0	22	0	.000		
1993–94	OUAA	26	2	24	0	–	–	4	16th	26	2	24	0	.077		
1994–95	OUAA	26	0	23	3	–	–	6	16th	26	0	23	3	.058		
1995–96	OUAA	26	7	18	1	–	–	15	T–12th	27	7	19	1	.278	Lost Division Semifinal, 2–5 (Toronto)	
1996–97	OUAA	26	2	21	3	–	–	7	16th	26	2	21	3	.135		
1997–98	OUA	26	2	20	4	–	–	8	16th	26	2	20	4	.154		
1998–99	OUA	26	4	21	1	–	–	9	16th	26	4	21	1	.173		
1999–00	OUA	26	3	23	0	–	–	6	16th	26	3	23	0	.115		
2000–01	OUA	24	5	19	0	–	–	10	14th	29	8	21	0	.276	Won Division Semifinal series, 2–0 (Queen's); Lost Division Final series, 1–2 (Toronto)	
2001–02	OUA	24	8	15	1	–	–	17	T–13th	26	8	17	1	.327	Lost Division Semifinal series, 0–2 (Ryerson)	
2002–03	OUA	24	6	17	1	–	–	13	13th	26	6	19	1	.250	Lost Division Semifinal series, 0–2 (Queen's)	
2003–04	OUA	24	3	20	0	1	–	7	15th	26	3	23	0	.115	Lost Division Semifinal series, 0–2 (Queen's)	
2004–05	OUA	24	8	10	0	6	–	22	11th	26	8	18	0	.308	Lost Division Semifinal series, 0–2 (Quebec–Trois-Rivières)	
2005–06	OUA	24	7	12	5	0	–	19	T–11th	26	7	14	5	.365	Lost Division Semifinal series, 0–2 (Quebec–Trois-Rivières)	
2006–07	OUA	28	7	16	4	1	–	19	15th	28	7	17	4	.321		
2007–08	OUA	28	10	16	–	0	2	22	15th	28	10	16	2	.393		
2008–09	OUA	28	8	18	–	1	1	18	17th	28	8	19	1	.304		
2009–10	OUA	28	6	18	–	3	1	16	18th	28	6	21	1	.232		
2010–11	OUA	28	5	22	–	1	0	11	19th	28	5	23	0	.179		
2011–12	OUA	28	3	23	–	2	0	8	19th	28	3	25	0	.107		
2012–13	OUA	28	3	22	–	2	1	9	19th	28	3	24	1	.125		
2013–14	OUA	28	3	22	–	2	1	9	20th	28	3	24	1	.125		
2014–15	OUA	26	0	23	–	3	0	3	19th	26	0	26	0	.000		
2015–16	OUA	28	4	21	–	3	0	11	19th	28	4	24	0	.143		
2016–17	OUA	28	6	20	–	1	1	14	19th	28	6	21	1	.232		
2017–18	OUA	28	7	16	–	5	0	19	20th	28	7	21	0	.250		
2018–19	OUA	28	7	19	–	2	0	16	20th	28	7	21	0	.250		
2019–20	OUA	28	9	18	–	1	0	19	T–18th	30	9	21	0	.300	Lost Division Semifinal series, 0–2 (Carleton)	
2020–21	Season cancelled due to COVID-19 pandemic															
2021–22	OUA	20	2	15	–	3	0	.175	19th	20	2	18	0	.100		
2022–23	OUA	26	7	17	–	1	1	16	17th	26	7	18	1	.288		
2023–24	OUA	28	7	19	–	0	2	16	17th	28	7	19	2	.286		
Totals										GP	W	L	T/SOL	%	Championships	
Regular Season										1320	286	964	70	.243	1 OSLC Championship	
Conference Post-season										24	4	20	0	.167		
U Sports Postseason										0	0	0	0	–		
Regular Season and Postseason Record										1344	290	984	70	.242		

Note: Totals include results from senior level except for Independent seasons from 1978–1982.
