= RMCSJ Remparts men's ice hockey =

- University: Royal Military College Saint-Jean
- Conference: RSEQ II
- Arena: Saint-Jean-sur-Richelieu, Quebec
- Colors: Blue and White

Conference regular season champions
- 1955

The RMCSJ Remparts men's ice hockey team (French: CMRSJ Remparts) is an ice hockey team representing the Royal Military College Saint-Jean. The team was first organized in 1953, a year after the foundation of the college. The program was mothballed in 1970 but returned to ice an official club team in 2023.

== History ==
After the establishment of the Royal Military College Saint-Jean in 1952, the school fielded its first varsity ice hockey team in its second year. The club initially played at the intermediate (second tier) level and joined its sister school, the Royal Military College, in the Ottawa–St. Lawerence Conference (OSLC). After going winless in its first season, the Remparts went undefeated to win the league championship in 1955. Though unable to replicate the title, RMCSJ remained a member of the conference until 1962 when they withdrew from play. The Remparts returned to the ice in 1965 and played well in their first two seasons back. Unfortunately, the team declined towards the end of the decade and ended with a winless season in 1970. That was the final campaign for RMCSJ as the program was suspended after the season.

In 2008, students from Royal Military College Saint-Jean organized a co-educational team and played in the local recreational league. The informal squad persisted until 2023 when the school permitted the students to form a club team and begin play in the second division of the Réseau du sport étudiant du Québec (RSEQ).

== Season-by-season results ==
=== Senior hockey and intermediate collegiate play ===
Note: GP = Games played, W = Wins, L = Losses, T = Ties, OTL = Overtime Losses, SOL = Shootout Losses, Pts = Points

U Sports Champion	U Sports Semifinalist	Conference regular season champions	Conference Division Champions	Conference Playoff Champions

Season	Conference	Regular Season													Conference Tournament Results	National Tournament Results
Season	Conference	Conference								Overall					Conference Tournament Results	National Tournament Results
Season	Conference	GP	W	L	T	OTL	SOL	Pts*	Finish	GP	W	L	T	%	Conference Tournament Results	National Tournament Results
1953–54	OSLC	6	0	6	0	–	–	.000	8th	?	?	?	?	?		
1954–55	OSLC	5	5	0	0	–	–	1.000	1st	?	?	?	?	?		
1955–56	OSLC	9	4	4	1	–	–	.500	3rd	?	?	?	?	?		
1956–57	OSLC	?	?	?	?	?	?	?	?	?	?	?	?	?		
1957–58	OSLC	?	?	?	?	?	?	?	?	?	?	?	?	?		
1958–59	OSLC	?	?	?	?	?	?	?	?	?	?	?	?	?		
1959–60	OSLC	9	4	4	1	–	–	.500	4th	?	?	?	?	?		
1960–61	OSLC	?	?	?	?	?	?	?	?	?	?	?	?	?		
Totals										GP	W	L	T/SOL	%	Championships	
Regular Season										—	—	—	—	—	1 OSLC Championship	
Conference Post-season										—	—	—	—	—		
U Sports Postseason										—	—	—	—	—		
Regular Season and Postseason Record										—	—	—	—	—		

=== Senior collegiate play ===
Note: GP = Games played, W = Wins, L = Losses, T = Ties, OTL = Overtime Losses, SOL = Shootout Losses, Pts = Points

U Sports Champion	U Sports Semifinalist	Conference regular season champions	Conference Division Champions	Conference Playoff Champions

Season	Conference	Regular Season													Conference Tournament Results	National Tournament Results
Season	Conference	Conference								Overall					Conference Tournament Results	National Tournament Results
Season	Conference	GP	W	L	T	OTL	SOL	Pts*	Finish	GP	W	L	T	%	Conference Tournament Results	National Tournament Results
1961–62	OSLC	9	2	7	0	–	–	4	T–7th	9	2	7	0	.222		
program suspended
1965–66	OSLC	16	7	9	0	–	–	14	5th	16	7	9	0	.438		
1966–67	OSLC	18	8	7	3	–	–	19	5th	18	8	7	3	.528		
1967–68	OSLC	16	4	11	1	–	–	9	T–7th	16	4	11	1	.281		
1968–69	OSLC	18	2	16	0	–	–	16	7th	18	2	16	0	.111		
1969–70	OSLC	14	0	14	0	–	–	0	8th	14	0	14	0	.000		
program suspended
Totals										GP	W	L	T/SOL	%	Championships	
Regular Season										91	23	64	4	.275		
Conference Post-season										0	0	0	0	–		
U Sports Postseason										0	0	0	0	–		
Regular Season and Postseason Record										91	23	64	4	.275		

Note: Totals include senior collegiate play only.

== See also ==
- RMC Paladins men's ice hockey
