= Queen's Gaels men's ice hockey =

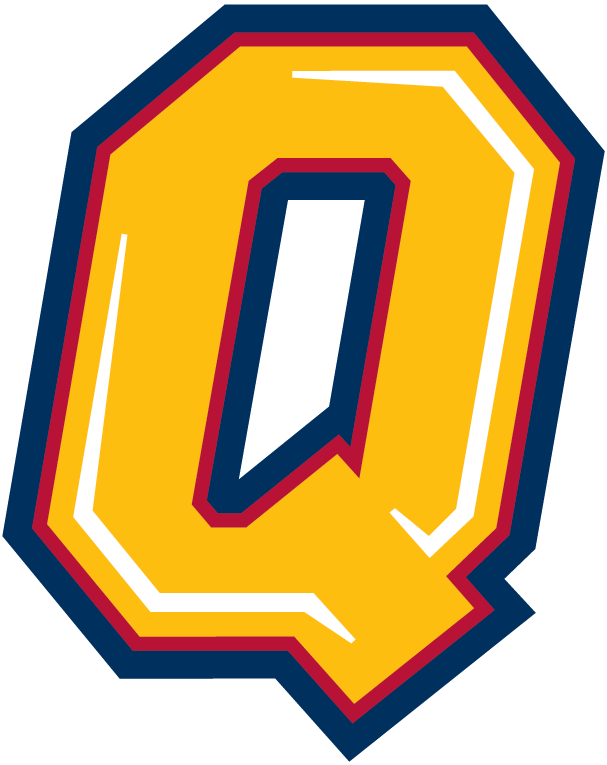
- University: Queen's University at Kingston
- Conference: OUA; OUA East Division
- Head coach: Brett Gibson; Since 2005–06 season
- Assistant coaches: Ben Munroe; Patrick Sanvido; Mike Murphy
- Arena: Kingston Memorial Centre; Kingston, Ontario
- Colors: Gold, Blue, and Red

U Sports tournament appearances
- 1981, 2017, 2019, 2025

Conference tournament champions
- 1981, 2019

The Queen's Gaels men's ice hockey team is an ice hockey team representing the Queen's Gaels athletics program of Queen's University at Kingston. The team is a member of the Ontario University Athletics conference and compete in U Sports. The Gaels play their home games at the Memorial Centre Arena in Kingston, Ontario.

== History ==
=== 19th century ===
The earliest recorded game for Queen's came in 1884 but its unclear if the match was officially sanctioned by the University or not. In 1886, a group of students from Queen's arranged a match against fellow undergraduates from the Royal Military College. The game took place on Kingston harbor and is typically regarded as the first game between two teams from Ontario. The two schools have been rivals ever since, the oldest such rivalry in the sport. The young program played when it was able to find the time and opposition but was stabilized when it became a founding member of the Ontario Hockey Association.

In 1886, Queen's challenged the Royal Military College of Canada to a game played on the frozen Kingston harbour; the two schools play annually for the Carr-Harris Cup, to continue the world's oldest hockey rivalry. Queen's hockey is one of the oldest hockey clubs in the world; only McGill University's team, started in 1875, is older among Canadian university teams. Queen's played its first season in 1883–84, with the first game for which records exist played against a team from Petawawa.

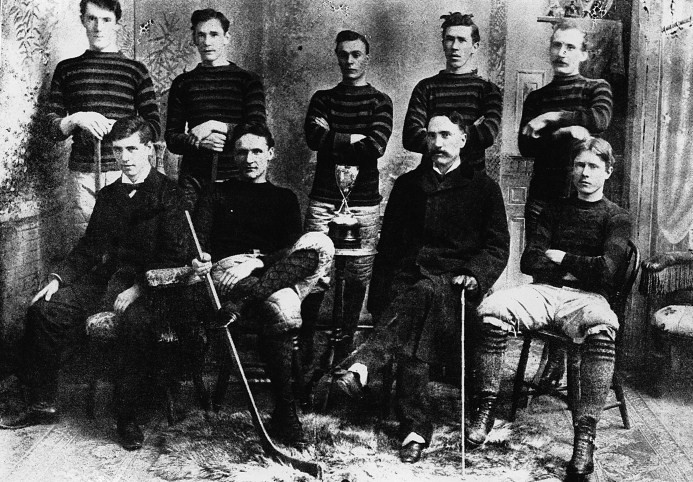
Queen's team of 1895

In the 1890s, Queen's played in the Ontario Hockey Association (OHA), winning its championship three times consecutively, taking the Cosby Cup into its permanent possession. Queen's won the inaugural J. Ross Robertson Cup during the 1898–99 season, as the senior ice hockey champion of the OHA. As Ontario champion, the Queen's hockey team was a regular in Stanley Cup Challenge Games by challenging in 1895, 1899 and 1906.

Playing senior hockey at the time, Queen's won a league championship in 1895 and challenged the Montreal Hockey Club for the Stanley Cup. They were reportedly outmatched in the game and lost 1–5. Four years later the team had its second opportunity for the cup when they faced the Montreal Shamrocks in 1899. This match went about as well as the last with Queen's losing 2–6.

=== Allan Cup ===
At the beginning of the 20th century, Queen's joined with McGill and Toronto to form the first college conference in Canada. Queen's won two league championships in the first four years of play and leveraged their second intercollegiate title into a third challenge for the Stanley Cup. The Ottawa Hockey Club (later known as the 'Senators') easily dismissed the school boys with a pair of victories totaling 14–28. By 1909, the sport had become such a sensation in Canada that the various teams were separated into professional and amateur ranks. The Allan Cup was created as the amateur's version of the Stanley Cup and was initially awarded to the Ottawa Cliffsides. Queen's, by winning the intercollegiate title that season, earned the first challenge for the cup and defeated Ottawa 5–4, becoming the national amateur champions in the process. Queen's retained possession of the cup for a year and, after repeating as intercollegiate champs, they received their first challenge from the Cliffsides. Queen's cemented their place as the better of the two with a second win but were then beset by St. Michael's College and fell 4–5. Queen's returned to intercollegiate play afterwards and, though they were champions again in 1914, they did not challenge for the Allan Cup.

=== Interwar years ===
In 1915 the college schedule was cancelled due to World War I and Queen's rejoined the OHA for the duration. After the war, the Tricolour, as they were then known, returned to the intercollegiate conference but found they had been outpaced by Toronto. Over an 8-year span, Queen's would not post a winning record and eventually they withdrew from the league altogether. Queen's returned to the OHA in 1929, playing two seasons before suspending play due to financial constraints. Queen's was able to restart its program in the mid 30's and joined a new international intercollegiate league. Queen's played well in the four seasons of league play but the arrangement ended with the outbreak of World War II.

Queen's operated a junior ice hockey team during the 1920s in the OHA. The junior team won the J. Ross Robertson Cup as the provincial champions in 1926, and had been finalists in 1921. Queen's reached the 1926 Memorial Cup finals, but lost to the Calgary Canadians for the national championship.

=== Transition period ===
Queen's returned to play after the war but had fallen even further behind their contemporaries. The newly christened 'Golden Gaels' posted dismal records for five years, routinely finishing last in the conference, and withdrew in 1950. After one season in the OHA, which was no better, the program was suspended for the remainder of the decade. The Gaels returned to play in 1960 and joined the Quebec-Ontario Athletic Association. They were a middle of the pack team for most of the next two decades and remained with the Ontario side when the conference was realigned in 1971. 1981 saw Queen's win its first conference championship in over 65 years and the Gaels made their first appearance in the national tournament.

=== Long recovery ===
After the title, Queen's had a few good years in the early 80s but slipped into the bottom half of the conference by the middle of the decade. After 1984, Queen's did not post a winning record for over 20 years and didn't fully regain their previous form until 2014. The Gaels finally returned to the national tournament in 2017 and won their second league championship two years later.

In 2018–19, the Gaels won their first Queen's Cup in 38 years, 4–1 over Guelph Gryphons in front of a 2,900 people at the Kingston Memorial Centre.

== Season-by-season results ==
=== Senior and collegiate play ===
Note: GP = Games played, W = Wins, L = Losses, T = Ties, Pts = Points

Extra-League Champion	U Sports Semifinalist	Conference regular season champions	Conference Division Champions	Conference Playoff Champions

Season	Conference	Regular Season											Conference Tournament Results	National Tournament Results
Season	Conference	Conference						Overall					Conference Tournament Results	National Tournament Results
Season	Conference	GP	W	L	T	Pts*	Finish	GP	W	L	T	%	Conference Tournament Results	National Tournament Results
Senior Hockey
1890–91	OHA	3	2	1	0	4	–	?	?	?	?	?	Lost Semifinal, 0–4 (Ottawa Hockey Club)	
1891–92	OHA	3	2	1	0	4	–	?	?	?	?	?	Won First Round, 9–1 (Royal Military College); Won Second Round, 11–1 (Kingston Hockey Club); Lost Quarterfinal, 0–5 (Ottawa Hockey Club)	
1892–93	OHA	4	3	1	0	6	–	?	?	?	?	?	Won Quarterfinal, 14–2 (Peterborough); Lost Semifinal, 3–6 (Ottawa Hockey Club)	
1893–94	OHA	3	1	2	0	2	–	?	?	?	?	?	Lost Semifinal, 1–4 (Ottawa Hockey Club)^{‡} Lost Championship, 2–3 (Osgoode Hall)	
1894–95	OHA	4	4	0	0	8	1st	?	?	?	?	?	Won Semifinal, 19–5 (Toronto); Won Championship, 17–3 (Trinity)	Lost Stanley Cup Challenge, 1–5 (Montreal Hockey Club)
1895–96	OHA	0	0	0	0	0	–	?	?	?	?	?	Won Semifinal, 6–3 (Ayr); Won Championship, 12–3 (Stratford)	
1896–97	OHA	0	0	0	0	0	–	?	?	?	?	?	Won Semifinal series, default (Peterborough); Won Championship series, 12–7 (Toronto)	
1897–98	OHA	0	0	0	0	0	–	?	?	?	?	?	Won Quarterfinal series, 32–6 (Royal Military College); Won Semifinal series, 7–5 (Brockville); Lost Championship, 3–7 (Osgoode Hall)	
1898–99	OHA	2	2	0	0	4	1st	?	?	?	?	?	Won Quarterfinal series, 25–8 (Brockville); Won Championship series, 19–11 (Toronto)	Lost Stanley Cup Challenge, 2–6 (Montreal Shamrocks)
1899–00	OHA	0	0	0	0	0	–	?	?	?	?	?	Won Group Semifinal, default (Brockville); Won Group Final series, 19–5 (Royal Military College); Won Semifinal series, 17–6 (Cornwall); Lost Championship series, 4–6 (Toronto Wellingtons)	
1900–01	OHA	2	1	1	0	2	1st	?	?	?	?	?	Lost Provincial Final series, 2–7 (Toronto Wellingtons)	
1901–02	OHA	2	1	1	0	2	2nd	?	?	?	?	?		
Senior and Collegiate Hockey
1902–03	CIAU	4	2	2	0	4	2nd	?	?	?	?	?		
1903–04	CIAU	4	3	1	0	6	1st	?	?	?	?	?		
1904–05	CIAU	4	2	2	0	4	2nd	?	?	?	?	?		
1905–06	CIAU	4	3	1	0	6	1st	?	?	?	?	?		Lost Stanley Cup Challenge series, 0–2 (Ottawa Silver Seven)
1906–07	CIAU	4	1	3	0	2	3rd	?	?	?	?	?		
1907–08	CIAU	6	3	3	0	6	2nd	?	?	?	?	?		
1908–09	CIAU	6	5	1	0	10	1st	?	?	?	?	?		Won Allan Cup Challenge, 5–4 (Ottawa Cliffsides)
1909–10	CIAU	6	4	2	0	8	T–1st	?	?	?	?	?	Won Championship, 8–2 (Ottawa)	Won Allan Cup Challenge, 6–3 (Ottawa Cliffsides); Lost Allan Cup Challenge, 4–5 (St. Michael's College)
1910–11	CIAU	4	2	2	0	4	3rd	?	?	?	?	?		
1911–12	CIAU	4	0	4	0	0	5th	?	?	?	?	?		
1912–13	CIAU	4	1	3	0	2	3rd	?	?	?	?	?		
1913–14	CIAU	4	3	1	0	6	1st	?	?	?	?	?		
1914–15	CIAU	4	1	3	0	2	T–2nd	?	?	?	?	?		
1915–16	OHA	3	1	2	0	2	?	?	?	?	?	?		
1916–17	OHA	7	0	7	0	0	?	?	?	?	?	?		
1917–18	OHA	5	1	4	0	2	?	?	?	?	?	?		
Program suspended
1919–20	CIAU	4	0	4	0	0	3rd	?	?	?	?	?		
1920–21	CIAU	4	0	4	0	0	3rd	?	?	?	?	?		
1921–22	CIAU	4	0	4	0	4	3rd	?	?	?	?	?		
1922–23	CIAU	6	3	3	0	6	2nd	?	?	?	?	?		
1923–24	CIAU	6	3	3	0	6	2nd	?	?	?	?	?		
1924–25	CIAU	6	3	3	0	6	2nd	?	?	?	?	?		
1925–26	CIAU	6	2	4	0	4	3rd	?	?	?	?	?		
1926–27	CIAU	6	0	6	0	0	4th	?	?	?	?	?		
Program suspended
1928–29	OHA	11	6	5	0	12	2nd	?	?	?	?	?	Lost Championship series, 5–9 (Toronto)	
1929–30	OHA	12	6	5	1	13	3rd	?	?	?	?	?		
Program suspended
1934–35	OHA	4	1	3	0	2	T–2nd	?	?	?	?	?		
Program suspended
1936–37	CIAU	6	1	5	0	2	4th	?	?	?	?	?		
1936–37	IIL ^{†}	10	4	6	0	8	5th	?	?	?	?	?		
1937–38	CIAU	6	4	2	0	8	2nd	?	?	?	?	?		
1937–38	IIL	10	8	2	0	16	2nd	?	?	?	?	?		
1938–39	CIAU	6	4	2	0	8	2nd	?	?	?	?	?		
1938–39	IIL	10	7	3	0	14	3rd	?	?	?	?	?		
1939–40	CIAU	4	0	4	0	4	3rd	?	?	?	?	?		
1939–40	IIL	8	4	4	0	8	5th	?	?	?	?	?		
Program suspended
1945–46	CIAU	6	0	6	0	0	4th	?	?	?	?	?		
1946–47	CIAU	9	1	8	0	2	4th	?	?	?	?	?		
1947–48	CIAU	12	3	9	0	6	3rd	?	?	?	?	?		
1948–49	CIAU	12	0	12	0	0	4th	?	?	?	?	?		
1949–50	CIAU	12	1	11	0	2	4th	?	?	?	?	?		
1950–51	OHA	34	5	29	0	10	?	?	?	?	?	?		
Program suspended
Totals								GP	W	L	T	%	Championships	
Regular Season								?	?	?	?	?	3 OHA Championships, 5 CIAU Championships	
Conference Post-season								?	?	?	?	?	4 OHA Championships, 1 CIAU Championship	
Regular Season and Postseason Record								?	?	?	?	?	2 Allan Cup Championships	

† The International Intercollegiate League (IIL) was a joint venture between Canadian and American colleges.
‡ Ottawa refused to play in the championship due to a dispute of the site of the final game. Queen's assumed their place instead.

=== Collegiate only ===
Note: GP = Games played, W = Wins, L = Losses, T = Ties, OTL = Overtime Losses, SOL = Shootout Losses, Pts = Points

U Sports Champion	U Sports Semifinalist	Conference regular season champions	Conference Division Champions	Conference Playoff Champions

Season	Conference	Regular Season													Conference Tournament Results	National Tournament Results
Season	Conference	Conference								Overall					Conference Tournament Results	National Tournament Results
Season	Conference	GP	W	L	T	OTL	SOL	Pts*	Finish	GP	W	L	T	%	Conference Tournament Results	National Tournament Results
1959–60	QOAA	8	4	4	0	–	–	16	3rd	8	4	4	0	.500		
Program suspended
1961–62	QOAA	12	5	5	2	–	–	12	4th	12	5	5	2	.500		
1962–63	QOAA	12	3	8	1	–	–	7	T–6th	12	3	8	1	.292		
1963–64	QOAA	12	3	7	2	–	–	8	6th	12	3	7	2	.333		
1964–65	QOAA	16	8	6	2	–	–	18	4th	18	9	7	2	.556	Won Semifinal, 6–4 (Toronto); Lost Championship, 3–4 (Montreal)	
1965–66	QOAA	16	6	10	0	–	–	12	T–5th	16	6	10	0	.375		
1966–67	QOAA	16	8	5	3	–	–	19	4th	17	8	6	3	.559	Lost Semifinal, 1–10 (Toronto)	
1967–68	QOAA	16	3	13	0	–	–	6	8th	16	3	13	0	.188		
1968–69	QOAA	15	5	10	0	–	–	10	T–9th	15	5	10	0	.333		
1969–70	QOAA	14	1	12	1	–	–	3	12th	14	1	12	1	.107		
1970–71	QOAA	15	7	4	4	–	–	18	4th	17	8	5	4	.588	Won Semifinal, 8–3 (Waterloo); Lost Championship, 4–5 (Toronto)	
1971–72	OUAA	19	8	10	1	–	–	17	9th	19	8	10	1	.447		
1972–73	OUAA	17	10	6	1	–	–	21	T–5th	18	10	7	1	.583	Lost Quarterfinal, 4–5 (OT) (Laurentian)	
1973–74	OUAA	19	10	7	2	–	–	22	7th	20	10	8	2	.550	Lost Quarterfinal, 0–3 (Toronto)	
1974–75	OUAA	14	6	6	2	–	–	14	9th	14	6	6	2	.500		
1975–76	OUAA	16	9	5	2	–	–	20	7th	17	9	6	2	.588	Lost Quarterfinal, 1–2 (Toronto)	
1976–77	OUAA	19	4	14	1	–	–	9	14th	19	4	14	1	.237		
1977–78	OUAA	20	7	9	4	–	–	18	T–8th	20	7	9	4	.450		
1978–79	OUAA	16	2	10	4	–	–	8	T–10th	16	2	10	4	.250		
1979–80	OUAA	22	17	3	2	–	–	36	2nd	?	?	?	?	?	results unavailable	
1980–81	OUAA	22	14	3	5	–	–	33	1st	28	19	4	5	.768	Won Semifinal series, 2–0 (York); Won Championship series, 2–0 (Western Ontario)	Lost Pool B Round-Robin, 3–2 (Concordia), 4–5 (Saskatchewan)
1981–82	OUAA	22	13	7	2	–	–	28	T–3rd	23	13	8	2	.609	Lost Quarterfinal, 3–7 (Wilfrid Laurier)	
1982–83	OUAA	24	15	8	1	–	–	31	4th	27	16	10	1	.611	Won Quarterfinal, 4–3 (McMaster); Lost Semifinal series, 0–2 (Toronto)	
1983–84	OUAA	24	11	9	4	–	–	26	6th	25	11	10	4	.520	Lost Quarterfinal, 4–9 (Western Ontario)	
1984–85	OUAA	24	7	13	4	–	–	18	9th	24	7	13	4	.375		
1985–86	OUAA	24	6	16	2	–	–	14	10th	24	6	16	2	.292		
1986–87	OUAA	24	4	15	5	–	–	13	T–10th	24	4	15	5	.271		
1987–88	OUAA	25	6	18	1	–	–	13	15th	25	6	18	1	.260		
1988–89	OUAA	26	12	12	2	–	–	26	11th	29	13	14	2	.483	Lost Division Semifinal series, 1–2 (Quebec–Trois-Rivières)	
1989–90	OUAA	22	8	14	0	–	–	16	13th	22	8	14	0	.364		
1990–91	OUAA	22	2	19	1	–	–	5	15th	22	2	19	1	.114		
1991–92	OUAA	22	4	17	1	–	–	9	14th	22	4	17	1	.205		
1992–93	OUAA	22	8	11	3	–	–	19	T–10th	26	10	13	3	.442	Won First Round, 4–3 (Quebec–Trois-Rivières); Lost Quarterfinal series, 1–2 (Toronto)	
1993–94	OUAA	26	7	18	1	–	–	15	T–13th	27	7	19	1	.278	Lost First Round, 1–4 (Toronto)	
1994–95	OUAA	26	3	19	4	–	–	10	15th	27	3	20	4	.185	Lost First Round, 4–5 (Toronto)	
1995–96	OUAA	26	7	18	1	–	–	15	T–12th	26	7	18	1	.288		
1996–97	OUAA	26	4	18	4	–	–	12	14th	27	4	19	4	.222	Lost Division Semifinal, 3–7 (Toronto)	
1997–98	OUA	26	8	16	2	–	–	18	13th	28	8	18	2	.321	Lost Division Semifinal series, 0–2 (Toronto)	
1998–99	OUA	26	5	14	7	–	–	17	13th	32	8	17	7	.359	Won Division Semifinal series, 2–1 (Toronto); Lost Division Final series, 1–2 (Guelph)	
1999–00	OUA	26	9	15	2	–	–	20	12th	32	13	17	2	.438	Won Division Semifinal series, 2–1 (Toronto); Won Division Final series, 2–0 (Guelph); Lost Queen's Cup Semifinal, 1–3 (Quebec–Trois-Rivières)	
2000–01	OUA	24	6	16	2	–	–	14	T–12th	26	6	18	2	.269	Lost Division Semifinal series, 0–2 (Royal Military College)	
2001–02	OUA	24	4	19	1	–	–	9	15th	24	4	19	1	.188		
2002–03	OUA	24	7	17	0	–	–	14	12th	29	10	19	0	.345	Won Division Semifinal series, 2–0 (Royal Military College); Lost Division Final series, 1–2 (Toronto)	
2003–04	OUA	24	9	13	2	0	–	20	T–11th	28	11	15	2	.429	Won Division Quarterfinal series, 2–0 (Royal Military College); Lost Division Semifinal series, 0–2 (Toronto)	
2004–05	OUA	24	8	14	0	2	–	18	14th	24	8	16	0	.333		
2005–06	OUA	24	7	15	1	1	–	16	15th	24	7	16	1	.313		
2006–07	OUA	28	8	14	5	1	–	22	11th	30	8	17	5	.350	Lost Division Quarterfinal series, 0–2 (Ottawa)	
2007–08	OUA	28	13	12	–	0	3	29	10th	30	13	14	3	.483	Lost Division Semifinal series, 0–2 (McGill)	
2008–09	OUA	28	12	13	–	1	2	27	14th	28	12	14	2	.464		
2009–10	OUA	28	14	12	–	1	1	30	10th	31	15	15	1	.500	Lost Division Quarterfinal series, 1–2 (Carleton)	
2010–11	OUA	28	14	11	–	3	0	31	T–10th	30	14	16	0	.467	Lost Division Quarterfinal series, 0–2 (Nipissing)	
2011–12	OUA	28	13	13	–	0	2	28	T–13th	30	13	15	2	.467	Lost Division Quarterfinal series, 0–2 (McGill)	
2012–13	OUA	28	10	11	–	6	1	27	14th	30	10	19	1	.350	Lost Division Quarterfinal series, 0–2 (Carleton)	
2013–14	OUA	28	17	6	–	2	3	39	5th	33	20	10	3	.632	Won Division Quarterfinal series, 2–0 (Ottawa); Lost Division Semifinal series, 1–2 (Carleton)	
2014–15	OUA	26	13	12	–	1	0	27	T–9th	31	15	16	0	.484	Won Division Quarterfinal series, 2–1 (Laurentian); Lost Division Semifinal series, 0–2 (McGill)	
2015–16	OUA	28	17	7	–	3	1	38	T–4th	31	18	12	1	.597	Lost Division Quarterfinal series, 1–2 (Ontario Tech)	
2016–17	OUA	28	18	7	–	2	1	39	5th	37	24	12	1	.662	Won Division Quarterfinal series, 2–1 (Ottawa); Won Division Semifinal series, 2–0 (Concordia); Won Division Final series, 2–0 (McGill); Lost Queen's Cup, 3–4 (York)	Lost Quarterfinal, 1–5 (New Brunswick)
2017–18	OUA	28	19	6	–	3	0	41	3rd	33	22	11	0	.667	Won Division Quarterfinal series, 2–0 (Nipissing); Lost Division Semifinal series, 1–2 (Concordia)	
2018–19	OUA	28	18	10	–	0	0	36	6th	37	25	12	0	.676	Won Division Quarterfinal series, 2–0 (Ontario Tech); Won Division Semifinal series, 2–1 (Ottawa); Won Division Final series, 2–0 (Carleton); Won Queen's Cup, 4–1 (Guelph)	Lost Quarterfinal, 3–5 (St. Francis Xavier)
2019–20	OUA	28	12	13	–	1	2	27	14th	30	12	16	2	.433	Lost Division Semifinal series, 0–2 (Quebec–Trois-Rivières)	
2020–21	Season cancelled due to COVID-19 pandemic															
2021–22	OUA	19	17	1	–	0	1	.921	1st	20	17	2	1	.875	Lost Division Quarterfinal, 2–3 (OT) (McGill)	
2022–23	OUA	26	12	12	–	2	0	26	T–12th	26	12	14	0	.462		
2023–24	OUA	28	19	8	–	1	0	39	T–4th	30	19	11	0	.633	Lost Division Quarterfinal series, 0–2 (Concordia)	
Totals										GP	W	L	T/SOL	%	Championships	
Regular Season										1406	566	726	114	.443	2 Mid East Division Titles, 1 OUAA Championship, 1 OUA Championship	
Conference Post-season										104	45	59	0	.433	1 OUAA Championship, 1 OUA Championship	
U Sports Postseason										4	1	3	0	.250	3 National tournament appearances	
Regular Season and Postseason Record										1514	612	788	114	.442		

Note: Totals include results from 1959–60 onward except for the 1980 conference tournament.

== Playoff results ==
- 1999–00 Defeated Toronto Varsity Blues in first round, 2 games to 1.
  - Down 4-1 heading into the 3rd period of game 3. Scored 3 goals in 82 seconds to tie the game and another 74 secs later to take the lead. Won the game 6–4 with an empty net goal.
  - Defeated Guelph Gryphons in quarter-final, 2 games to 0.
  - Lost to UQTR in OUA Final Four, semi-final, 3–2.
- 2000–01 Lost to RMC Paladins in first round 2 games to 0
- 2001–02 Out of playoffs
- 2002–03 Defeated RMC Paladins in first round 2 games to 0
  - Lost to Toronto Varsity Blues in quarter-final 2 games to 1
- 2003–04 Defeated RMC Paladins in first round 2 games to 0
  - Lost to Toronto Varsity Blues in quarter-final 2 games to 0
- 2004–05 Out of playoffs
- 2005–06 Out of playoffs
- 2006–07 Lost to Ottawa Gee-Gees in quarter-final 2 games to 0
- 2007–08 Gained first round bye
  - Lost to McGill Redmen in semi-final 2 games to 0
- 2008–09 Did not qualify for playoffs
- 2009–10 Lost to Carleton in OUA first round 2 games to 1
- 2010–11 Lost to Nipissing in OUA first round 2 games to 0
- 2013–14 Lost to Carleton in OUA East semi-final 2 games to 1
- 2014–15 Lost to McGill in OUA East semi-final 2 games to 0
- 2015–16 Lost to UOIT in OUA first round 2 games to 1
- 2016–17 Lost to York in OUA final
- 2017–18 Lost to Concordia in OUA East semi-final 2 games to 1
- 2018–19 Defeated Concordia 2–0
  - Defeated Ottawa 2–1
  - Defeated Carleton 2–0
  - Defeated Guelph 4–1 (Won OUA Championship)
  - Lost to St. FX X-Men 5–3 (USports quarterfinals)

== See also ==
Queen's Gaels women's ice hockey
