= Macdonald Clansmen ice hockey =

- University: Macdonald Campus
- Arena: Sainte-Anne-de-Bellevue, Quebec
- Colors: Green and Gold

The Macdonald Clansmen ice hockey team was an ice hockey team representing the Macdonald Campus of McGill University. The team was organized after World War II as an intermediate program, independent of the clubs at the parent college of McGill University, and existed until the 1970s.

== History ==
In the late 1940s, several smaller schools in Ontario and Quebec began organizing a conference at the intermediate (second tier) level of play. With McGill's second team helping arrange the new league, the affiliated agricultural college at the Macdonald Campus agreed to take part and was one of eight founding members. The Clansmen played two seasons in the league before withdrawing from competition but did eventually return towards the end of the decade. In the early 60s, the Ottawa–St. Lawrence Conference (OSLC) grew in prominence until it was on par with the best leagues in Canada, however, Macdonald was not able to keep pace. The Clansmen finished at or near the bottom of the standings in most seasons but the team soldiered on despite the lack of on-ice success.

In 1971, McGill leased a portion of the Macdonald Campus to the new John Abbott College. Though Macdonald still continued at the time, the school decided to discontinue the ice hockey program as McGill began to move its faculty to the downtown campus. Macdonald returned to the ice for a one-year swan song in 1973 and finished winless in 18 games.

== Season-by-season results ==
=== Senior hockey and intermediate collegiate play ===
Note: GP = Games played, W = Wins, L = Losses, T = Ties, OTL = Overtime Losses, SOL = Shootout Losses, Pts = Points

U Sports Champion	U Sports Semifinalist	Conference regular season champions	Conference Division Champions	Conference Playoff Champions

Season	Conference	Regular Season													Conference Tournament Results	National Tournament Results
Season	Conference	Conference								Overall					Conference Tournament Results	National Tournament Results
Season	Conference	GP	W	L	T	OTL	SOL	Pts*	Finish	GP	W	L	T	%	Conference Tournament Results	National Tournament Results
1949–50	OSLC	9	5	4	0	–	–	.556	3rd	?	?	?	?	?		
1950–51	OSLC	8	1	7	0	–	–	.125	7th	?	?	?	?	?		
1951–52	Independent	?	?	?	?	?	?	?	?	?	?	?	?	?		
1952–53	Independent	?	?	?	?	?	?	?	?	?	?	?	?	?		
1953–54	Independent	?	?	?	?	?	?	?	?	?	?	?	?	?		
1954–55	Independent	?	?	?	?	?	?	?	?	?	?	?	?	?		
1955–56	Independent	?	?	?	?	?	?	?	?	?	?	?	?	?		
1956–57	Independent	?	?	?	?	?	?	?	?	?	?	?	?	?		
1957–58	OSLC	?	?	?	?	?	?	?	?	?	?	?	?	?		
1958–59	OSLC	?	?	?	?	?	?	?	?	?	?	?	?	?		
1959–60	OSLC	10	6	4	0	–	–	.600	3rd	?	?	?	?	?		
1960–61	OSLC	?	?	?	?	?	?	?	?	?	?	?	?	?		
Totals										GP	W	L	T/SOL	%	Championships	
Regular Season										—	—	—	—	—		
Conference Post-season										—	—	—	—	—		
U Sports Postseason										—	—	—	—	—		
Regular Season and Postseason Record										—	—	—	—	—		

=== Senior collegiate play ===
Note: GP = Games played, W = Wins, L = Losses, T = Ties, OTL = Overtime Losses, SOL = Shootout Losses, Pts = Points

U Sports Champion	U Sports Semifinalist	Conference regular season champions	Conference Division Champions	Conference Playoff Champions

Season	Conference	Regular Season													Conference Tournament Results	National Tournament Results
Season	Conference	Conference								Overall					Conference Tournament Results	National Tournament Results
Season	Conference	GP	W	L	T	OTL	SOL	Pts*	Finish	GP	W	L	T	%	Conference Tournament Results	National Tournament Results
1961–62	OSLC	9	3	5	1	–	–	7	T–5th	9	3	5	1	.389		
1962–63	OSLC	14	4	9	1	–	–	9	6th	14	4	9	1	.321		
1963–64	OSLC	14	1	12	1	–	–	3	8th	14	1	12	1	.107		
1964–65	OSLC	14	3	11	0	–	–	6	T–7th	14	3	11	0	.214		
1965–66	OSLC	16	3	12	1	–	–	7	8th	16	3	12	1	.219		
1966–67	OSLC	18	5	12	1	–	–	11	8th	18	5	12	1	.306		
1967–68	OSLC	16	3	13	0	–	–	6	9th	16	3	13	0	.188		
1968–69	OSLC	18	8	10	0	–	–	16	5th	18	8	10	0	.444		
1969–70	OSLC	14	2	12	0	–	–	4	7th	14	2	12	0	.143		
1970–71	OSLC	18	0	18	0	–	–	0	7th	18	0	18	0	.000		
program suspended
1973–74	QUAA	18	0	16	2	–	–	2	7th	18	0	16	2	.056		
program suspended
Totals										GP	W	L	T/SOL	%	Championships	
Regular Season										169	32	130	7	.210		
Conference Post-season										0	0	0	0	–		
U Sports Postseason										0	0	0	0	–		
Regular Season and Postseason Record										169	32	130	7	.210		

Note: Totals include senior collegiate play only.

== See also ==
- McGill Redbirds ice hockey
