= U Sports men's ice hockey =

Highest level of play of men's ice hockey at the university

- Formerly: CIAU men's ice hockey, CIS men's ice hockey
- Sport: Ice hockey
- Founded: 1961; 65 years ago
- No. of teams: 35
- Country: Canada
- Most recent champion: Quebec–Trois-Rivières Patriotes (2026)
- Most titles: Alberta Golden Bears (16)
- Broadcasters: Sportsnet; TVA Sports
- Website: usports.ca/mice

U Sports men's ice hockey is the highest level of play of men's ice hockey at the university level and operates under the auspices of U Sports, Canada's governing body for university sports. As of the 2018 season, 48 teams from Canadian universities are divided into three athletic conferences, drawing from three regional associations of U Sports: Canada West Universities Athletic Association, Ontario University Athletics, and Atlantic University Sport. At the end of every season, eight teams compete for the David Johnston University Cup, awarded to the U Sports Men's Hockey Championship team.

== History ==
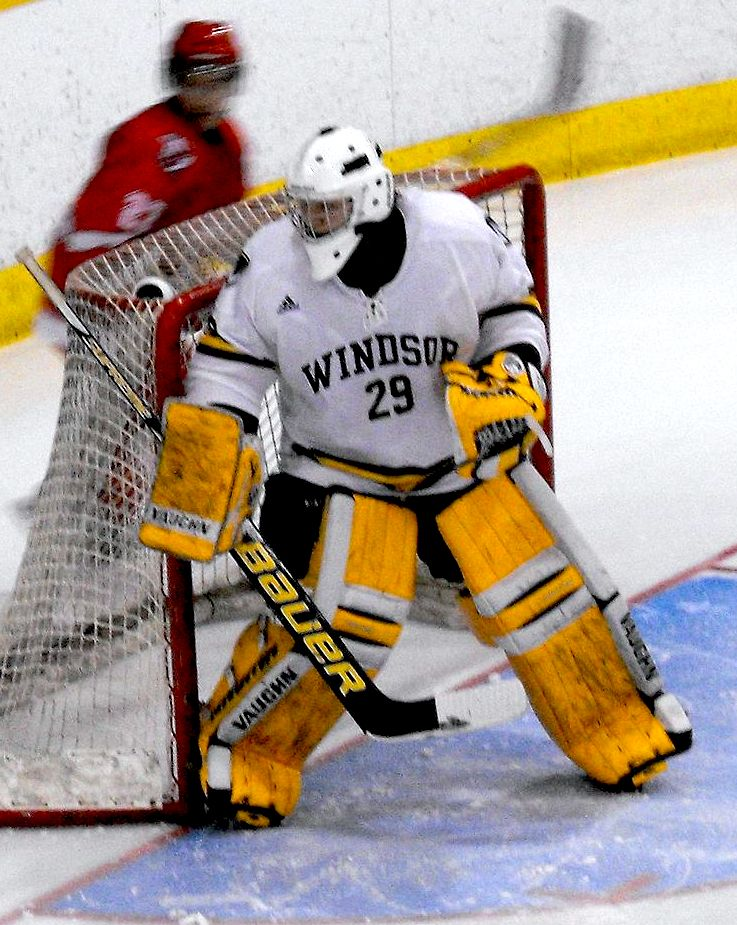
Windsor Lancers goalie in CIS playoff game (February 16, 2012)

The Canadian Intercollegiate Athletic Union was established in 1961 by Major W.J. McLeod, Athletic Director of the Royal Military College of Canada. By the 1962-63 season, the CIAU had created a National Championship for their ice hockey playoffs: the David Johnston University Cup.

The first ever national championship was competed for in Kingston, Ontario between the UBC Thunderbirds and the McMaster Marlins. The Marlins won the game 3-2.

The CIAU had competition in Canadian post-secondary varsity hockey at a national level, but rivalries only existed on an exhibition basis. The Canadian Colleges Athletic Association, now Canadian Collegiate Athletic Association, held national championships between 1975 and 2001. At one time, seven conferences in the CCAA sanctioned hockey, but only two do today — the Alberta Colleges Athletic Conference and the Quebec Student Sport Federation (now known by its French initialism of RSEQ).

In 1978, the governing body of the league changed its name to the Canadian Interuniversity Athletics Union. The body's name was changed in 2001 to Canadian Interuniversity Sport, and most recently in 2016, to the current U Sports.

The most successful team in U Sports history is the Alberta Golden Bears with 16 David Johnston University Cup titles, winning 28% of all championships awarded to date. This is followed by the Toronto Varsity Blues (last in 1984) and the UNB Reds (last in 2024) with 10 championships apiece. The reigning champions are the UNB Reds, who defeated the UQTR Patriotes 4-0 in Toronto, Ontario in March 2024.

On April 4, 2016, St. Thomas University announced the discontinuation of their men's hockey program, reducing the teams participating in the Atlantic University Sport (AUS) conference to seven.

On August 12, 2016, Kori Cheverie was announced as an assistant coach for the Ryerson Rams men’s ice hockey team, making her the first female full-time assistant coach in U Sports men’s hockey history.

The MacEwan Griffins and Trinity Western Spartans joined the Canada West conference beginning with the 2020-21 season. However, the Lethbridge Pronghorns announced the discontinuation of their hockey programs following the 2019-20 season due to budgetary constraints. Furthermore, following the cancellation of the 2020–21 season, the Laurentian Voyageurs discontinued their men's ice hockey program in 2021 leaving U Sports with 35 men's ice hockey teams.

== Teams ==
=== Atlantic University Sport ===
University	Varsity Name	City	Province	Founded	Arena	Capacity
Acadia University	Axemen	Wolfville	NS	1838	Andrew H. McCain Arena	1,800
Dalhousie University	Tigers	Halifax	NS	1818	Halifax Forum	6,300
St. Francis Xavier University	X-Men	Antigonish	NS	1853	Charles V. Keating Millennium Centre	1,501
Saint Mary's University	Huskies	Halifax	NS	1802	Dauphinee Centre	1,200
Université de Moncton	Aigles Bleu	Moncton	NB	1864	Jean-Louis Lévesque Arena	1,516
University of New Brunswick	Reds	Fredericton	NB	1785	Aitken University Centre	3,278
University of Prince Edward Island	Panthers	Charlottetown	PEI	1969	MacLauchlan Arena	1,400

=== Canada West Universities Athletic Association ===
University	Varsity Name	City	Province	Founded	Arena	Capacity
MacEwan University	Griffins	Edmonton	AB	1938	Downtown Community Arena	1,000
Mount Royal University	Cougars	Calgary	AB	1910	Flames Community Arenas	1,940
Trinity Western University	Spartans	Langley	BC	1962	Langley Events Centre	5,276
University of Alberta	Golden Bears	Edmonton	AB	1908	Clare Drake Arena	3,009
University of British Columbia	Thunderbirds	Vancouver	BC	1906	Thunderbird Sports Centre	7,500
University of Calgary	Dinos	Calgary	AB	1966	Father David Bauer Olympic Arena	1,750
University of Manitoba	Bisons	Winnipeg	MB	1877	Max Bell Centre	1,600
University of Regina	Cougars	Regina	SK	1974	The Co-operators Centre	1,300
University of Saskatchewan	Huskies	Saskatoon	SK	1907	Merlis Belsher Place	2,700

=== Ontario University Athletics ===
University	Varsity Name	City	Province	Founded	Arena	Capacity
**East Division**
Carleton University	Ravens	Ottawa	ON	1952	Carleton Ice House	500
Concordia University	Stingers	Montreal	QC	1896	Ed Meagher Arena	1,000
McGill University	Redbirds	Montreal	QC	1821	McConnell Arena	1,600
Nipissing University	Lakers	North Bay	ON	1909	North Bay Memorial Gardens	4,262
Queen's University	Golden Gaels	Kingston	ON	1841	Kingston Memorial Centre	3,300
Royal Military College of Canada	Paladins	Kingston	ON	1876	Constantine Arena	1,500
University of Ottawa	Gee-Gees	Ottawa	ON	1848	Minto Sports Complex	850
Ontario Tech University	Ridgebacks	Oshawa	ON	2002	Campus Ice Centre	500
Université du Québec à Trois-Rivières	Patriotes	Trois-Rivières	QC	1969	Colisée de Trois-Rivières	3,500
**West Division**
Brock University	Badgers	St. Catharines	ON	1964	Algoma Central Arena	1,200
Lakehead University	Thunderwolves	Thunder Bay	ON	1947	Fort William Gardens	4,680
Toronto Metropolitan University	Bold	Toronto	ON	1948	Mattamy Athletic Centre	2,796
University of Guelph	Gryphons	Guelph	ON	1964	Gryphon Centre	1,200
University of Toronto	Varsity Blues	Toronto	ON	1827	Goldring Centre for High Performance Sport	2,000
University of Waterloo	Warriors	Waterloo	ON	1957	Columbia Icefield Arena	680
University of Western Ontario	Mustangs	London	ON	1878	Thompson Arena	3,615
University of Windsor	Lancers	Windsor	ON	1857	Capri Pizzeria Recreation Complex	500
Wilfrid Laurier University	Golden Hawks	Waterloo	ON	1957	Waterloo Recreation Complex	3,400
York University	Lions	Toronto	ON	1959	Tait McKenzie Centre	1,200

=== Former teams ===
The following schools previously sponsored ice hockey but currently do not field a varsity men's team.

University	Varsity Name	City	Province	Years active	Cause
University of St. Joseph's College		Memramcook	NB	1934–1949 ^{†}	Program suspended
Technical University of Nova Scotia		Halifax	NS	1923–1964	Program suspended
Saint Dunstan's University	Saints	Charlottetown	PEI	1935–1969	Amalgamated into Prince Edward Island
Mount Allison University	Mounties	Sackville	NB	1895–1998	Program suspended
St. Thomas University	Tommies	Fredericton	NB	1938–2016 ^{†}	Program suspended
Memorial University of Newfoundland	Beothuks	St. John's	NL	1964–1982	Program suspended
Cape Breton University	Capers	Sydney	NS	1968–1995	Program suspended
University of King's College	Blue Devils	Halifax	NS	1919–1948	Program suspended

† only includes years of collegiate play

== Awards ==
The following are annual U Sports trophies and awards:

- David Johnston University Cup - Awarded annually to the U Sports men's ice hockey champions
- Senator Joseph A. Sullivan Trophy – Annual "Player of the Year" awarded to the most outstanding player in U Sports.
- U Sports Defenceman of the Year - Awarded annually to the most outstanding defenceman in U Sports.
- U Sports Goaltender of the Year – Awarded annually to the most outstanding goaltender in U Sports.
- Clare Drake Award - Annual "Rookie of the Year" award presented to "the most outstanding first-year player in U Sports who has exhibited exemplary skill and leadership".
- R.W. Pugh Award – Awarded annually to the most sportsmanlike player in U Sports.
- Dr. Randy Gregg Award - Awarded annually to reward excellence in the student-athlete. The player who receives this award has exhibited outstanding achievement in ice hockey, academics, and community involvement.
- Father George Kehoe Memorial Award – Coach of the Year award.
- U Sports All-Canadian Teams - Each year U Sports names a "First Team", "Second Team", and "All-Rookie Team".
