= Canada West men's ice hockey tournament =

Canada West Universities Athletic Association men's ice hockey tournament
- Conference hockey championship
- Sport: Ice hockey
- Conference: Canada West Universities Athletic Association
- Format: Single-elimination
- Played: 1973–Present

The Canada West men's ice hockey tournament is an annual conference championship held between member teams. The tournament champion received an automatic bid to participate in the University Cup tournament.

== History ==
In 1972, the Western Canadian Intercollegiate Athletic Association (WCIAA) decided to divide itself into two separate conferences due to the sizable area that the conference covered. The Great Plains Athletic Association (GPAA) was created for eastern schools while the western colleges were placed in the Canada West Universities Athletic Association (CWUAA). Originally a five-team league, the conference was soon down to four members when Victoria dropped its program in 1973.

1984 saw the conference expanded for the first time, adding Lethbridge to the league roster. The next season, due to the collapse of the since-renamed Great Plains Athletic Conference's (GPAC) hockey division, Canada West absorbed the three remaining schools. With the conference doubling its size in just two years, the playoff was expanded to include four teams for the first time in 1986. The conference tournament remained unchanged until 1996 when Canada West expanded the format. The league was reorganized into two divisions with three teams from each grouping now qualifying for the playoffs. This came due mostly to three teams failing to make the postseason virtually every season for a decade. From 1986 through '95, Brandon, Lethbridge and UBC combined for a total of three appearances. In 2000, a third place series was instituted for the first time and would be held in years when needed to determine a wild-card berth.

Brandon, after having spent most of its existence dwelling in the conference cellar, decided to suspend its program in 2002. Because the divisions were now lopsided, the league changed the qualifications for the Great Plains third seed; whichever team that finished last in the two divisions had the better record would receive the final spot in the Great Plains bracket. Only once (2007) did the fourth-place Mountain team qualify for the postseason. The very next year, the conference abandoned the divisional format and returned to a singular division. For over a decade, the conference remained a 7-team league. The quarterfinal round was dropped in 2010 but returned three years later when Mount Royal joined.

After the 2020 season, Lethbridge terminated both its men's and women's ice hockey program due to budget cuts. The following season ended up being cancelled due to the COVID-19 pandemic, however, when the league finally reconvened in the fall of 2021, Canada West had actually grown. The addition of MacEwan and Trinity Western brought the conference up to its greatest size at nine teams.

Throughout its history, the league had been dominated by Alberta; the Golden Bears have won 29 championships in 51 years of conference play (as of 2024) and gone on to capture 16 national championships, the most in the history of U Sports.

== 1973 ==
Seed	School	Standings
1	Alberta	17–7–0
T–2	Calgary	16–8–0
T–2	British Columbia	16–8–0
4	Saskatchewan	11–13–0
5	Victoria	0–24–0

No playoff

== 1974 ==
Seed	School	Standings
1	Calgary	14–4–0
2	Alberta	11–7–0
3	British Columbia	9–9–0
4	Saskatchewan	2–16–0

Championship; February 21-23
1	Calgary	2	6	-
2	Alberta	1	5	-

Note: * denotes overtime period(s)

== 1975 ==
Seed	School	Standings
1	Alberta	20–4–0
2	British Columbia	12–11–1
3	Calgary	11–12–1
4	Saskatchewan	4–20–0

Championship; February 21-23
1	Alberta	5	1	4
2	British Columbia	2	2	2

Note: * denotes overtime period(s)

== 1976 ==
Seed	School	Standings
1	Calgary	17–7–0
2	Alberta	16–8–0
3	British Columbia	12–12–0
4	Saskatchewan	3–21–0

Championship; February 27-28
1	Calgary	6	3	-
2	Alberta	2	0	-

Note: * denotes overtime period(s)

== 1977 ==
Seed	School	Standings
1	Alberta	21–3–0
2	British Columbia	14–10–0
3	Calgary	8–16–0
4	Saskatchewan	5–19–0

Championship; March 4-6
1	Alberta	4	4	8
2	British Columbia	3	5	3

Note: * denotes overtime period(s)

== 1978 ==
Seed	School	Standings
1	Alberta	20–4–0
2	British Columbia	14–10–0
3	Calgary	11–13–0
4	Saskatchewan	3–21–0

Championship; March 10-12
1	Alberta	4	1	9
2	British Columbia	2	2	1

Note: * denotes overtime period(s)

== 1979 ==
Seed	School	Standings
1	Alberta	20–4–0
2	Calgary	15–9–0
3	British Columbia	7–17–0
4	Saskatchewan	6–18–0

Championship; March 10-12
1	Alberta	6	3	3
2	Calgary	4	4	1

Note: * denotes overtime period(s)

== 1980 ==
Seed	School	Standings
1	Alberta	20–9–0
2	Calgary	18–11–0
3	Saskatchewan	14–15–0
4	British Columbia	12–17–0

Note: Canada West played an interlocking schedule with the GPAC.

Championship; February 28-March 1
1	Alberta	1	0	-
2	Calgary	3	2	-

Note: * denotes overtime period(s)

== 1981 ==
Seed	School	Standings
1	Calgary	18–6–0
2	Saskatchewan	15–9–0
3	Alberta	10–14–0
4	British Columbia	5–19–0

Championship; March 6-8
1	Calgary	3	4	2
2	Saskatchewan	6	3	3

Note: * denotes overtime period(s)

== 1982 ==
Seed	School	Standings
1	Saskatchewan	17–7–0
2	Calgary	14–10–0
3	Alberta	11–13–0
4	British Columbia	6–18–0

Championship; March 5-6
1	Saskatchewan	6	4	-
2	Calgary	2	2	-

Note: * denotes overtime period(s)

== 1983 ==
Seed	School	Standings
1	Saskatchewan	16–8–0
2	Alberta	13–11–0
3	Calgary	10–14–0
4	British Columbia	9–15–0

Championship; March 4-5
1	Saskatchewan	4	5	-
2	Alberta	1	1	-

Note: * denotes overtime period(s)

== 1984 ==
Seed	School	Standings
1	Alberta	20–4–0
2	Saskatchewan	14–10–0
3	Calgary	11–13–0
4	British Columbia	3–21–0

Championship
1	Alberta	4	9	-
2	Saskatchewan	2	2	-

Note: * denotes overtime period(s)

== 1985 ==
Seed	School	Standings
1	Alberta	20–4–0
2	Saskatchewan	16–8–0
3	British Columbia	12–12–0
4	Calgary	8–16–0
5	Lethbridge	4–20–0

Championship
1	Alberta	2	7	-
2	Saskatchewan	1	4	-

Note: * denotes overtime period(s)

== 1986 ==
Seed	School	Standings	Seed	School	Standings
1	Alberta	20–8–0	5	Brandon	13–15–0
2	Calgary	19–9–0	6	British Columbia	12–16–0
3	Manitoba	18–10–0	7	Regina	8–20–0
4	Saskatchewan	16–12–0	8	Lethbridge	6–22–0

Semifinal; February 28-March 2
1	Alberta	3	5	3
4	Saskatchewan	8	3	6
2	Calgary	4	2	4
3	Manitoba	3	4	3

Championship; March 7-9
4	Saskatchewan	3	6	3
2	Calgary	9	3	4

Note: * denotes overtime period(s)

== 1987 ==
Seed	School	Standings	Seed	School	Standings
1	Calgary	23–5–0	5	British Columbia	9–17–2
2	Alberta ^{†}	19–8–1	6	Brandon	10–18–0
3	Manitoba	17–10–1	7	Regina	9–18–1
4	Saskatchewan	16–11–1	8	Lethbridge	6–22–0

† Alberta was unable to compete in the tournament due to being Canada's representative in the World University Games.

Semifinal
1	Calgary	5	4	-
4	British Columbia	0	3	-
2	Manitoba	1	5	1
3	Saskatchewan	3	2	5

Championship
1	Calgary	5	7	2
3	Saskatchewan	4	9	6

Note: * denotes overtime period(s)

== 1988 ==
Seed	School	Standings	Seed	School	Standings
1	Calgary	23–5–0	5	British Columbia	10–16–2
T–2	Alberta	22–5–1	6	Brandon	8–18–2
T–2	Saskatchewan	22–5–1	7	Lethbridge	6–21–1
4	Manitoba	14–14–0	8	Regina	3–24–1

Semifinal
1	Calgary	5	?	5
4	Manitoba	4	?	4
2	Alberta	?	5	6
3	Saskatchewan	?	3	2

Championship
1	Calgary	3	7	8
2	Alberta	6	4	6

Note: * denotes overtime period(s)

== 1989 ==
Seed	School	Standings	Seed	School	Standings
T–1	Alberta	21–7–0	5	British Columbia	13–14–1
T–1	Calgary	21–7–0	6	Regina	9–16–3
3	Saskatchewan	19–9–0	7	Brandon	6–21–1
4	Manitoba	16–9–3	8	Lethbridge	3–25–0

Semifinal
1	Alberta	11	5	-
4	Manitoba	4	1	-
2	Calgary	5	3	4
3	Saskatchewan	4	5	3

Championship
1	Alberta	4	2	3
2	Calgary	2	4	1

Note: * denotes overtime period(s)

== 1990 ==
Seed	School	Standings	Seed	School	Standings
1	Calgary	21–6–1	T–4	Manitoba	14–14–0
2	Alberta	20–6–2	6	Brandon	12–16–0
3	British Columbia	16–11–1	7	Saskatchewan	10–16–2
T–4	Regina	13–13–2	8	Lethbridge	1–25–2

Semifinal
1	Calgary	2	4	-
4	Regina	1	0	-
2	Alberta	8	4	-
3	British Columbia	1	3	-

Championship
1	Calgary	5	6	-
2	Alberta	3	3	-

Note: * denotes overtime period(s)

== 1991 ==
Seed	School	Standings	Seed	School	Standings
1	Calgary	22–5–1	5	Manitoba	11–15–2
2	Alberta	19–7–2	6	British Columbia	8–15–5
3	Saskatchewan	12–12–4	7	Lethbridge	10–18–0
4	Regina	13–14–1	8	Brandon	7–16–5

Semifinal
1	Calgary	0	9	1
4	Regina	1	2	5
2	Alberta	5	7	-
3	Saskatchewan	2	5	-

Championship
4	Regina	3	6	3
2	Alberta	4	5	4

Note: * denotes overtime period(s)

== 1992 ==
Seed	School	Standings	Seed	School	Standings
1	Regina	19–6–3	T–5	Lethbridge	12–13–3
2	Alberta	17–6–5	T–5	Saskatchewan	13–14–1
3	Calgary	15–11–2	7	British Columbia	11–14–3
4	Manitoba	14–13–1	8	Brandon	1–25–2

Semifinal
1	Regina	7	8	-
4	Manitoba	6	1	-
2	Alberta	3	6	6
3	Calgary	4	5	4

Championship
1	Regina	3	3	-
2	Alberta	5	4	-

Note: * denotes overtime period(s)

== 1993 ==
Seed	School	Standings	Seed	School	Standings
1	Alberta	18–6–4	5	Manitoba	13–13–2
2	Regina	16–7–5	6	Lethbridge	9–16–3
3	Calgary	17–8–3	7	British Columbia	7–19–2
4	Saskatchewan	16–9–3	8	Brandon	3–21–4

Semifinal
1	Alberta	4	5	-
4	Saskatchewan	3	4	-
2	Regina	2	6	4
3	Calgary	4	2	1

Championship
1	Alberta	5	3	-
2	Regina	1	1	-

Note: * denotes overtime period(s)

== 1994 ==
Seed	School	Standings	Seed	School	Standings
1	Lethbridge	19–7–2	5	Manitoba	11–12–5
2	Calgary	17–7–4	6	British Columbia	7–17–4
3	Alberta	15–6–7	7	Saskatchewan	7–19–2
4	Regina	16–11–1	8	Brandon	5–18–5

Semifinal
1	Lethbridge	4	2	4
4	Regina	5	1	3
2	Calgary	3	5	-
3	Alberta	1	2	-

Championship
1	Lethbridge	2	2	2
2	Calgary	1	3	1

Note: * denotes overtime period(s)

== 1995 ==
Seed	School	Standings	Seed	School	Standings
1	Calgary	20–6–2	5	Alberta	11–12–5
2	Regina	17–9–2	6	British Columbia	10–13–5
3	Manitoba	15–11–2	7	Brandon	8–18–2
4	Lethbridge	14–13–1	8	Saskatchewan	7–20–1

Semifinal; February 24-25
1	Calgary	3	5	-
4	Lethbridge	2	1	-
2	Regina	2	3	-
3	Manitoba	5	4	-

Championship; March 3-4
1	Calgary	4	7	-
3	Manitoba	3	2	-

Note: * denotes overtime period(s)

== 1996 ==
Great Plains			Mountain		
Seed	School	Standings	Seed	School	Standings
1	Manitoba	16–10–2	1	Calgary	18–9–1
2	Regina	12–11–5	2	Alberta	17–10–1
3	Saskatchewan	11–14–3	3	Lethbridge	14–11–3
4	Brandon	6–21–1	4	British Columbia	9–17–2

Division Semifinal
G2	Regina	6	7	4
G3	Saskatchewan	3	8*	2
M2	Alberta	5	8	?
M3	Lethbridge	6*	2	?

Division Final
G1	Manitoba	3	8	1
G2	Regina	7	2	3
M1	Calgary	5	2	-
M2	Alberta	3	0	-

Championship
G2	Regina	5	3	-
M1	Calgary	7	4**	-

Note: * denotes overtime period(s)

== 1997 ==
Great Plains			Mountain		
Seed	School	Standings	Seed	School	Standings
1	Saskatchewan	15–9–2	1	Calgary	21–2–3
2	Manitoba	12–11–3	2	Alberta	20–5–1
3	Regina	7–17–2	3	Lethbridge	8–16–2
4	Brandon	5–19–2	4	British Columbia	7–16–3

Division Semifinal
G2	Manitoba	6	4	-
G3	Regina	3	0	-
M2	Alberta	7	4	7
M3	Lethbridge	1	6	0

Division Final
G1	Saskatchewan	5	3	-
G2	Manitoba	1	1	-
M1	Calgary	4	2	-
M2	Alberta	5	4	-

Championship
G1	Saskatchewan	1	3	-
M2	Alberta	2*	10	-

Note: * denotes overtime period(s)

== 1998 ==
Great Plains			Mountain		
Seed	School	Standings	Seed	School	Standings
1	Saskatchewan	19–4–5	1	Alberta	19–4–5
2	Manitoba	14–7–7	2	Calgary	13–12–3
3	Brandon	10–17–1	3	British Columbia	9–15–4
4	Regina	4–22–2	4	Lethbridge	8–15–5

Division Semifinal
G2	Manitoba	6	5	-
G3	Brandon	3	2	-
M2	Calgary	1	3**	9
M3	British Columbia	4	2	3

Division Final
G1	Saskatchewan	2	8	5
G2	Manitoba	6	4	2
M1	Alberta	5	8	-
M2	Calgary	2	3	-

Championship
G1	Saskatchewan	5	2	4
M1	Alberta	4	3**	2

Note: * denotes overtime period(s)

== 1999 ==
Great Plains			Mountain		
Seed	School	Standings	Seed	School	Standings
1	Saskatchewan	18–9–1	1	Alberta	20–6–2
2	Manitoba	13–11–4	2	Calgary	13–10–5
3	Brandon	12–13–3	3	Lethbridge	13–13–2
4	Regina	4–20–4	4	British Columbia	7–18–3

Division Semifinal
G2	Manitoba	5	2	-
G3	Brandon	2	1	-
M2	Calgary	7	2	6
M3	Lethbridge	6	6	2

Division Final
G1	Saskatchewan	4	10	-
G2	Manitoba	2	4	-
M1	Alberta	6	7	-
M2	Calgary	3	3	-

Championship
G1	Saskatchewan	5	4	-
M1	Alberta	2	1	-

Note: * denotes overtime period(s)

== 2000 ==
Great Plains			Mountain		
Seed	School	Standings	Seed	School	Standings
1	Saskatchewan	22–3–3	1	Alberta	20–3–5
2	Manitoba	11–15–2	2	Calgary	16–9–3
3	Brandon	11–17–0	3	Lethbridge	12–14–2
4	Regina	4–21–3	4	British Columbia	5–19–4

Division Semifinal
G2	Manitoba	2	2	-
G3	Brandon	6	4	-
M2	Calgary	5	5	-
M3	Lethbridge	4	3	-

Division Final
G1	Saskatchewan	6	5	-
G3	Brandon	5	0	-
M1	Alberta	9	3	-
M2	Calgary	3	2	-

Championship
G1	Saskatchewan	7	1	7
M1	Alberta	6	5	3
Third Place
G3	Brandon	2	3	-
M2	Calgary	4	7	-

Note: * denotes overtime period(s)

== 2001 ==
Great Plains			Mountain		
Seed	School	Standings	Seed	School	Standings
1	Manitoba	17–8–3	1	Alberta	25–1–2
2	Saskatchewan	14–10–4	2	Calgary	13–12–3
3	Regina	9–14–5	3	Lethbridge	11–14–3
4	Brandon	4–21–3	4	British Columbia	6–19–3

Division Semifinal
G2	Saskatchewan	6	6	-
G3	Regina	2	4	-
M2	Calgary	1	4	5
M3	Lethbridge	3	3	4

Division Final
G1	Manitoba	3	4	2
G2	Saskatchewan	5	3	0
M1	Alberta	4	8	-
M2	Calgary	0	0	-

Championship
G1	Manitoba	1	1	-
M1	Alberta	3	5	-

Note: * denotes overtime period(s)

== 2002 ==
Great Plains			Mountain		
Seed	School	Standings	Seed	School	Standings
1	Saskatchewan	17–8–3	1	Alberta	21–3–4
2	Manitoba	14–12–2	2	Calgary	16–11–1
3	Regina	12–12–4	3	Lethbridge	9–14–5
4	Brandon	5–20–3	4	British Columbia	5–19–4

Quarterfinal
G2	Manitoba	4	5	-
G3	Regina	2	1	-
M2	Calgary	5	8	-
M3	Lethbridge	0	4	-

Semifinal
M1	Alberta	5	9	-
G2	Manitoba	2	3	-
G1	Saskatchewan	4	7	-
M2	Calgary	1	2	-

Championship
M1	Alberta	5	6	-
G1	Saskatchewan	1	2	-

Note: * denotes overtime period(s)

== 2003 ==
Great Plains			Mountain		
Seed	School	Standings	Seed	School	Standings
1	Saskatchewan	16–10–2	1	Alberta	24–2–2
2	Manitoba	12–13–3	2	Calgary	14–12–2
3	Regina	11–16–1	3	Lethbridge	10–16–2
			4	British Columbia	5–23–0

Division Semifinal
G2	Manitoba	6	4	-
G3	Regina	2	0	-
M2	Calgary	2	2	6
M3	Lethbridge	1	5	4

Division Final
G1	Saskatchewan	5	5	-
G2	Manitoba	3	0	-
M1	Alberta	7	5	-
M2	Calgary	2	2	-

Championship
G1	Saskatchewan	4	2	2
M1	Alberta	2	4	5

Note: * denotes overtime period(s)

== 2004 ==
Great Plains			Mountain		
Seed	School	Standings	Seed	School	Standings
1	Saskatchewan	15–9–4	1	Alberta	26–0–2
2	Regina	10–14–4	2	Calgary	16–10–2
3	Manitoba	8–14–6	3	British Columbia	7–19–2
			4	Lethbridge	4–20–4

Division Semifinal
G2	Regina	4	4	-
G3	Manitoba	2	3	-
M2	Calgary	5	1	6
M3	British Columbia	2	3	2

Division Final
G1	Saskatchewan	4	6	-
G2	Regina	2	1	-
M1	Alberta	4	6	-
M2	Calgary	1	0	-

Championship
G1	Saskatchewan	2	1	-
M1	Alberta	5	8	-

Note: * denotes overtime period(s)

== 2005 ==
Great Plains			Mountain		
Seed	School	Standings	Seed	School	Standings
1	Saskatchewan	19–6–3	1	Alberta	24–3–1
2	Manitoba	15–8–5	2	Calgary	12–10–6
3	Regina	6–17–5	3	British Columbia	5–17–6
			4	Lethbridge	3–23–2

Division Semifinal
G2	Manitoba	5	9	-
G3	Regina	1	6	-
M2	Calgary	6	3	-
M3	British Columbia	0	2	-

Division Final
G1	Saskatchewan	6	4	-
G2	Manitoba	3	3	-
M1	Alberta	4	7	-
M2	Calgary	3	1	-

Championship
G1	Saskatchewan	4	2	-
M1	Alberta	7	4	-
Third Place
G2	Manitoba	3	5	-
M2	Calgary	1	2	-

Note: * denotes overtime period(s)

== 2006 ==
Great Plains			Mountain		
Seed	School	Standings	Seed	School	Standings
1	Saskatchewan	17–7–4	1	Alberta	21–5–2
2	Manitoba	12–13–3	2	Calgary	13–13–2
3	Regina	10–16–2	3	British Columbia	12–15–1
			4	Lethbridge	4–20–4

Division Semifinal
G2	Manitoba	3	7	6
G3	Regina	4	1	2
M2	Calgary	3	5	4
M3	British Columbia	4	4	1

Division Final
G1	Saskatchewan	6	5	-
G2	Manitoba	5	4	-
M1	Alberta	8	7	-
M2	Calgary	1	4	-

Championship
G1	Saskatchewan	0	1	-
M1	Alberta	2	6	-

Note: * denotes overtime period(s)

== 2007 ==
Great Plains			Mountain		
Seed	School	Standings	Seed	School	Standings
1	Saskatchewan	16–9–3	1	Alberta	20–4–4
2	Regina	13–12–3	2	Lethbridge	14–9–5
3	Manitoba	10–16–2	3	British Columbia	14–13–1
			4	Calgary	11–13–4

Division Semifinal
G2	Regina	4	0	1
M4	Calgary	2	2	2
M2	Lethbridge	5	4	3
M3	British Columbia	6	3	5

Division Final
G1	Saskatchewan	3	2	-
M4	Calgary	2	0	-
M1	Alberta	5	3	-
M3	British Columbia	1	2	-

Championship
G1	Saskatchewan	3	4	-
M1	Alberta	2	3	-

Note: * denotes overtime period(s)

== 2008 ==
Seed	School	Standings	Seed	School	Standings
1	Alberta	21–5–2	5	British Columbia	12–16–0
2	Saskatchewan	17–5–6	6	Regina	10–15–3
3	Calgary	16–8–4	7	Lethbridge	9–18–1
4	Manitoba	13–13–2			

Quarterfinal
3	Calgary	5	4	-
6	Regina	2	3	-
4	Manitoba	6	4	-
5	British Columbia	0	2	-

Semifinal
1	Alberta	4	4	-
4	Manitoba	2	3	-
2	Saskatchewan	5	5	-
3	Calgary	3	2	-

Championship
1	Alberta	8	5	-
2	Saskatchewan	3	0	-

Note: * denotes overtime period(s)

== 2009 ==
Seed	School	Standings	Seed	School	Standings
1	Alberta	22–4–0–2	5	British Columbia	11–14–1–2
2	Saskatchewan	17–9–1–1	6	Regina	11–15–0–2
3	Manitoba	13–9–1–5	7	Calgary	10–16–2–0
4	Lethbridge	14–13–0–1			

Quarterfinal
3	Manitoba	2	0	-
6	Regina	3	1	-
4	Lethbridge	4	3*	3
5	British Columbia	5*	2	4*

Semifinal
1	Alberta	1	4	7
6	Regina	5	1	1
2	Saskatchewan	5	4	-
5	British Columbia	3	2	-

Championship
1	Alberta	5	7	-
2	Saskatchewan	2	0	-

Note: * denotes overtime period(s)

== 2010 ==
Seed	School	Standings	Seed	School	Standings
1	Alberta	23–4–0–1	5	Lethbridge	13–11–2–2
2	Saskatchewan	16–8–3–1	6	Regina	9–17–2–0
3	Manitoba	16–10–0–2	7	British Columbia	8–19–0–1
4	Calgary	13–9–3–3			

Semifinal
1	Alberta	5	3	-
4	Calgary	2	1	-
2	Saskatchewan	5	2	1
3	Manitoba	2	4	5

Championship
1	Alberta	1	2	4
3	Manitoba	4	1	2

Note: * denotes overtime period(s)

== 2011 ==
Seed	School	Standings	Seed	School	Standings
1	Alberta	19–6–2–1	5	Lethbridge	13–10–2–3
2	Calgary	17–8–1–2	6	British Columbia	11–12–4–1
3	Saskatchewan	17–11–0–0	7	Regina	8–18–0–2
4	Manitoba	13–9–3–3			

Semifinal
1	Alberta	4	2	-
4	Manitoba	0	1	-
2	Calgary	4	2	4
3	Saskatchewan	2	3	1

Championship
1	Alberta	3	8	-
2	Calgary	0	1	-

Note: * denotes overtime period(s)

== 2012 ==
Seed	School	Standings	Seed	School	Standings
1	Manitoba	20–5–3–0	5	British Columbia	12–12–1–3
2	Alberta	20–6–1–1	6	Lethbridge	7–18–3–0
3	Saskatchewan	19–6–3–0	7	Regina	5–20–2–1
4	Calgary	15–11–1–1			

Quarterfinal
3	Saskatchewan	4	10	-
6	Lethbridge	2	3	-
4	Calgary	3	4	3
5	British Columbia	4	0	2

Semifinal
1	Manitoba	1	3	-
4	Calgary	2	4*	-
2	Alberta	7	2	3
3	Saskatchewan	3	3*	4*

Championship
4	Calgary	2	1	3
3	Saskatchewan	1	4	4

Note: * denotes overtime period(s)

== 2013 ==
Seed	School	Standings	Seed	School	Standings
1	Alberta	23–4–0–1	5	British Columbia	14–11–1–2
2	Saskatchewan	19–8–0–1	6	Regina	13–12–3–0
3	Manitoba	17–7–2–2	7	Mount Royal	7–19–2–0
4	Calgary	17–11–0–0	8	Lethbridge	2–22–4–0

Quarterfinal
3	Manitoba	6	5	-
6	Regina	2	0	-
4	Calgary	3	2	4
5	British Columbia	1	4	1

Semifinal
1	Alberta	4	2	-
4	Calgary	0	0	-
2	Saskatchewan	7	1	4
3	Manitoba	1	4	1

Championship
1	Alberta	5	4	5
2	Saskatchewan	0	5*	0

Note: * denotes overtime period(s)

== 2014 ==
Seed	School	Standings	Seed	School	Standings
1	Alberta	25–2–1–0	5	Mount Royal	11–14–3–0
2	Calgary	21–4–3–0	T–6	British Columbia	11–15–2–0
3	Saskatchewan	17–10–1–0	T–6	Regina	11–15–1–1
4	Manitoba	12–12–3–1	8	Lethbridge	4–21–2–1

Quarterfinal
3	Saskatchewan	0	5	4
6	British Columbia	5	2	7
4	Manitoba	2	4	2
5	Mount Royal	3*	2	0

Semifinal
1	Alberta	5	6	-
6	British Columbia	1	2	-
2	Calgary	5	2	2*
4	Manitoba	1	3*	1

Championship
1	Alberta	8	2	-
2	Calgary	1	1	-

Note: * denotes overtime period(s)

== 2015 ==
Seed	School	Standings	Seed	School	Standings
1	Alberta	24–3–1–0	5	Manitoba	15–13–0–0
2	Calgary	20–8–0–0	6	Saskatchewan	10–15–1–2
3	Mount Royal	17–10–0–1	7	Regina	8–17–2–1
4	British Columbia	13–10–5–0	8	Lethbridge	5–23–0–0

Quarterfinal
3	Mount Royal	2*	3	3
6	Saskatchewan	1	4	0
4	British Columbia	5	3	3
5	Manitoba	1	4*	1

Semifinal
1	Alberta	3	4	-
4	British Columbia	1	3	-
2	Calgary	3*	2	6
3	Mount Royal	2	5	3

Championship
1	Alberta	5	2	-
2	Calgary	2	1	-

Note: * denotes overtime period(s)

== 2016 ==
Seed	School	Standings	Seed	School	Standings
1	Saskatchewan	22–6–0–0	T–4	Calgary	12–12–4–0
2	Alberta	19–7–1–1	6	British Columbia	11–13–4–0
3	Mount Royal	17–8–3–0	7	Lethbridge	11–15–2–0
T–4	Manitoba	13–13–2–0	8	Regina	7–21–0–0

Quarterfinal
3	Mount Royal	3	7	-
6	British Columbia	1	3	-
4	Manitoba	3	1	1
5	Calgary	1	2	6

Semifinal
1	Saskatchewan	4*	5	-
5	Calgary	3	3	-
2	Alberta	7	5	-
3	Mount Royal	1	3	-

Championship
1	Saskatchewan	4	3	-
2	Alberta	0	2	-

Note: * denotes overtime period(s)

== 2017 ==
Seed	School	Standings	Seed	School	Standings
1	Saskatchewan	21–5–1–1	5	Manitoba	14–12–2–0
2	Alberta	18–8–2–0	6	British Columbia	12–13–2–1
3	Calgary	18–9–1–0	7	Lethbridge	11–14–3–0
4	Mount Royal	15–11–2–0	8	Regina	3–22–3–0

Quarterfinal
3	Calgary	5*	5	-
6	British Columbia	4	2	-
4	Mount Royal	6	2	7
5	Manitoba	1	3	1

Semifinal
1	Saskatchewan	4	3	-
4	Mount Royal	3	2	-
2	Alberta	5*	3	-
3	Calgary	4	2	-

Championship
1	Saskatchewan	3	2	3
2	Alberta	4	0	6

Note: * denotes overtime period(s)

== 2018 ==
Seed	School	Standings	Seed	School	Standings
1	Alberta	23–4–1–0	5	Calgary ^{†}	12–13–3–0
2	Saskatchewan	20–7–1–0	6	Mount Royal	12–14–1–1
3	Manitoba	16–10–2–0	7	Lethbridge ^{†}	9–16–3–0
4	British Columbia ^{†}	16–10–2–0	8	Regina	4–22–1–1

† Calgary was forced to forfeit 6 games for using an ineligible player. The games were retroactively recorded as 0–1 losses.
As a result, UBC gained 4 points in the standings while Lethbridge gained 2.

Quarterfinal
3	Manitoba	2	3	-
6	Mount Royal	3	5	-
4	British Columbia	4	3	2
5	Calgary	1	6	4

Semifinal
1	Alberta	4*	6	-
6	Mount Royal	3	1	-
2	Saskatchewan	6	1	3
5	Calgary	4	2	1

Championship
1	Alberta	5	5	-
2	Saskatchewan	2	1	-

Note: * denotes overtime period(s)

== 2019 ==
Seed	School	Standings	Seed	School	Standings
1	Saskatchewan	25–3–0–0	5	Mount Royal	12–11–5–0
2	Alberta	24–3–1–0	6	Lethbridge	9–17–2–0
3	Calgary	18–7–2–1	7	Manitoba	6–20–2–0
4	British Columbia	14–12–2–0	8	Regina	4–23–1–0

Quarterfinal
3	Calgary	5	4**	-
6	Lethbridge	1	3	-
4	British Columbia	2	3	2
5	Mount Royal	4	1	5

Semifinal
1	Saskatchewan	5	7	-
5	Mount Royal	1	3	-
2	Alberta	3	6	-
3	Calgary	1	3	-

Championship
1	Saskatchewan	4	0	0
2	Alberta	2	3	1

Note: * denotes overtime period(s)

=== Quarterfinals ===
==== (3) Calgary vs. (6) Lethbridge ====
February 15	Calgary	5 – 1	Lethbridge	Father David Bauer Olympic Arena

February 16	Calgary	4 – 3	2OT	Lethbridge	Father David Bauer Olympic Arena

Calgary wins series 2 – 0

==== (4) British Columbia vs. (5) Mount Royal ====
February 15	British Columbia	2 – 4	Mount Royal	Thunderbird Sports Centre
No scoring		First period	Ryley Lindgren (1) – 08:02
04:46 – pp – Tyler Sandhu (1)		Second period	Kord Pankewicz (1) – pp – 13:23
19:59 – Maxwell James (1)		Third period	Chris Gerrie (1) – 10:09; David Stephens (1) – en – 19:51
Rylan Toth (28 saves / 31 shots)		Goalie stats	Riley Morris (17 saves / 19 shots)

February 16	British Columbia	3 – 1	Mount Royal	Thunderbird Sports Centre
00:54 – sh – Zack Henry (1)		First period	No scoring
06:19 – pp – Tyler Sandhu (2); 15:21 – Tyler Sandhu (3)		Second period	No scoring
19:52 – en – Austin Vetterl (1)		Third period	No scoring
Rylan Toth (27 saves / 28 shots)		Goalie stats	Riley Morris (26 saves / 28 shots)

February 17	British Columbia	2 – 5	Mount Royal	Thunderbird Sports Centre
Jerret Smith (1) – 15:46; Adam Rossignol (1) – 17:28		First period	04:15 – Jamal Watson (1)
No scoring		Second period	03:15 – Ryley Lindgren (2); 08:43 – Kord Pankewicz (2)
No scoring		Third period	17:57 – en – Brad Kennedy (1); 18:58 – en – Connor Chartier (1)
Rylan Toth (24 saves / 27 shots)		Goalie stats	Riley Morris (21 saves / 23 shots)

Mount Royal wins series 2 – 1

=== Semifinals ===
==== (1) Saskatchewan vs. (5) Mount Royal ====
February 22	Saskatchewan	5 – 1	Mount Royal	Merlis Belsher Place
03:45 – Levi Cable (1); 06:19 – pp – Alex Forsberg (1)		First period	No scoring
04:36 – Parker Thomas (1); 13:03 – Alex Forsberg (2)		Second period	No scoring
04:10 – Levi Cable (2)		Third period	Brad Kennedy (2) – pp – 15:49
Taran Kozun (19 saves / 20 shots)		Goalie stats	Riley Morris (36 saves / 41 shots)

February 23	Saskatchewan	7 – 3	Mount Royal	Merlis Belsher Place
09:21 – Levi Cable (3); 11:31 – Levi Cable (4); 15:15 – sh – Andrew Johnson (1)		First period	Zack Henry (2) – 01:29; Ryley Lindgren (3) – pp – 07:24
05:03 – pp – Carson Stadnyk (1); 07:17 – pp – Alex Forsberg (3)		Second period	Zack Henry (3) – 02:53
04:53 – Carson Stadnyk (2); 17:05 – en – Levi Cable (5)		Third period	No scoring
Taran Kozun (12 saves / 15 shots)		Goalie stats	Riley Morris (27 saves / 33 shots)

Saskatchewan wins series 2 – 0

==== (2) Alberta vs. (3) Calgary ====
February 22	Alberta	3 – 1	Calgary	Clare Drake Arena
18:26 – Jason Fram (1)		First period	Dylan Busenius (1) – 09:13
16:28 – Jason Fram (2)		Second period	No scoring
04:19 – Cole Linaker		Third period	No scoring
Zach Sawchenko (14 saves / 15 shots)		Goalie stats	Matthew Greenfield (26 saves / 29 shots)

February 23	Alberta	6 – 3	Calgary	Clare Drake Arena
08:25 – Grayson Pawlenchuk (1); 19:43 – Brandon Magee (1)		First period	No scoring
01:44 – Jayden Hart (1); 13:15 – Riley Kieser (1)		Second period	Dane Gibson (1) – pp – 05:39
17:19 – en – Stephane Legault (1); 19:12 – en – Grayson Pawlenchuk (2)		Third period	Luke Harrison (1) – 16:16; Tim Vanstone (1) – 18:26
Zach Sawchenko (18 saves / 21 shots)		Goalie stats	Matthew Greenfield (28 saves / 32 shots)

Calgary wins series 2 – 0

=== Finals ===
==== (1) Saskatchewan vs. (2) Alberta ====
March 1	Saskatchewan	4 – 2	Alberta	Merlis Belsher Place
02:32 – Jaimen Yakubowski (1)		First period	Brandon Magee (2) – pp – 12:42
04:06 – Parker Thomas (2); 07:33 – pp – Wyatt Johnson (1)		Second period	Jayden Hart (2) – pp – 19:19
15:58 – Carter Folk (1)		Third period	No scoring
Taran Kozun (24 saves / 26 shots)		Goalie stats	Zach Sawchenko (21 saves / 25 shots)

March 2	Saskatchewan	0 – 3	Alberta	Merlis Belsher Place
No scoring		First period	No scoring
No scoring		Second period	Riley Kieser (2) – 00:19; Trevor Cox (1) – 13:46
No scoring		Third period	Grayson Pawlenchuk (3) – pp – 09:11
Taran Kozun (27 saves / 30 shots)		Goalie stats	Zach Sawchenko (20 saves / 20 shots)

March 3	Saskatchewan	0 – 1	Alberta	Merlis Belsher Place
No scoring		First period	No scoring
No scoring		Second period	Luke Philp (1) – pp – 17:44
No scoring		Third period	No scoring
Taran Kozun (27 saves / 28 shots)		Goalie stats	Zach Sawchenko (29 saves / 29 shots)

Alberta wins series 2 – 1

== 2020 ==
Seed	School	Standings	Seed	School	Standings
T–1	Alberta	23–5–0–0	5	British Columbia	9–14–4–1
T–1	Saskatchewan	22–4–2–0	6	Manitoba	9–15–2–2
3	Calgary	18–7–3–0	7	Regina	8–17–2–1
4	Mount Royal	18–8–0–2	8	Lethbridge	5–20–2–1

Quarterfinal
3	Calgary	6	2	-
6	Manitoba	2	1	-
4	Mount Royal	2	5	4
5	British Columbia	4	3	5*

Semifinal
1	Alberta	2	6	1
5	British Columbia	3*	1	2
2	Saskatchewan	2	5**	-
3	Calgary	1	4	-

Championship
5	British Columbia	2	1	-
2	Saskatchewan	3	3	-

Note: * denotes overtime period(s)

== 2021 ==
Season cancelled due to the COVID-19 pandemic

== 2022 ==
Seed	School	Standings	Seed	School	Standings
1	Alberta	16–3–1–0	6	Regina	10–9–1–0
2	British Columbia	14–5–1–0	7	Manitoba	7–12–1–0
3	Mount Royal	13–6–1–0	8	MacEwan	3–17–0–0
4	Saskatchewan	13–7–0–0	9	Trinity Western	2–17–1–0
5	Calgary	12–7–1–0			

Quarterfinal
3	Mount Royal	4	3*	-
6	Regina	3	2	-
4	Saskatchewan	2	4	3
5	Calgary	3	0	4

Semifinal
1	Alberta	6	6	-
5	Calgary	2	1	-
2	British Columbia	5	2	2
3	Mount Royal	0	3	1

Championship
1	Alberta	3	7	-
2	British Columbia	1	0	-

Note: * denotes overtime period(s)

== 2023 ==
Seed	School	Standings	Seed	School	Standings
1	Calgary	25–3–0–0	6	Regina	8–17–2–1
2	Alberta	20–5–2–1	7	MacEwan	9–18–1–0
3	British Columbia	20–6–1–1	8	Manitoba	8–19–0–1
4	Mount Royal	19–5–4–0	9	Trinity Western	3–24–1–0
5	Saskatchewan	14–10–4–0			

Quarterfinal
3	British Columbia	7	7	-
6	Regina	1	0	-
4	Mount Royal	3	4	2
5	Saskatchewan	5	0	3*

Semifinal
1	Calgary	3	4	6
5	Saskatchewan	5	2	1
2	Alberta	3	4	6
3	British Columbia	4	3	3

Championship
1	Calgary	3*	4	2
2	Alberta	2	5*	1

Note: * denotes overtime period(s)

== 2024 ==
Seed	School	Standings	Seed	School	Standings
1	British Columbia	22–4–1–1	6	MacEwan	9–17–0–2
2	Calgary	21–5–1–1	7	Regina	6–20–1–1
3	Mount Royal	21–6–0–1	8	Manitoba	5–22–1–0
4	Saskatchewan	20–6–1–1	9	Trinity Western	4–23–0–1
5	Alberta	18–8–2–0			

Quarterfinal
3	Mount Royal	4	6	-
6	MacEwan	1	4	-
4	Saskatchewan	4	2	4
5	Alberta	2	3	5*

Semifinal
1	British Columbia	1	4	4
5	Alberta	4	2	0
2	Calgary	4	4*	-
3	Mount Royal	2	3	-

Championship
1	British Columbia	2	2	5
2	Calgary	5	1	3

Note: * denotes overtime period(s)

== 2025 ==
West			East		
Seed	School	Standings	Seed	School	Standings
1	Mount Royal	22–6–0–0	1	Saskatchewan	23–5–0–0
2	British Columbia	18–8–0–2	2	Alberta	21–6–1–0
3	Calgary	16–10–0–2	3	MacEwan	10–15–2–1
4	Trinity Western	3–22–2–1	4	Manitoba	8–18–1–1
			5	Regina	5–22–0–1

Quarterfinal
E2	Alberta	2*	2	4
W3	Calgary	1	3	1
W2	British Columbia	2	3	4
E3	MacEwan	3*	1	3

Semifinal
W1	Mount Royal	3*	0	4
E2	Alberta	2	6	2
E1	Saskatchewan	4	3	4
W2	British Columbia	5*	2	2

Championship
W1	Mount Royal	3	2*	0
E1	Saskatchewan	6	1	3

Note: * denotes overtime period(s)

== Championships ==
School	Championships
Alberta	29
Saskatchewan	11
Calgary	9
British Columbia	1
Lethbridge	1

== See also ==
- WCIAU men's ice hockey tournament
- WCIAA men's ice hockey tournament
- GPAC men's ice hockey tournament
