= 1963 CIAU University Cup =

Canadian hockey tournament

Tournament details
- Venue(s): Jock Harty Arena, Kingston, Ontario
- Dates: March 15–16
- Teams: 4

Final positions
- Champions: McMaster Marlins (1st title)
- Runners-up: British Columbia Thunderbirds
- Third place: St. Francis Xavier X-Men
- Fourth place: Sherbrooke Vert et Or

Tournament statistics
- Games played: 4

Awards
- MVP: Bill Mahoney (McMaster)

The 1963 CIAU Men's University Cup Hockey Tournament (inaugural) was held at the Jock Harty Arena in Kingston, Ontario. The Queen's Gaels and Royal Military College Redmen served as tournament hosts.

== Road to the Cup ==
=== MIAA playoffs ===
Championship
1	New Brunswick	5	4	4
2	St. Francis Xavier	0	7	5

Note: * denotes overtime period(s)

=== OSLC playoffs ===
Semifinals
1	Ottawa	5
4	Sir George Williams	3
2	Sherbrooke	5
3	Royal Military College	4

Championship
1	Ottawa	5
2	Sherbrooke	6

Note: * denotes overtime period(s)

=== QOAA playoffs ===
Championship
E1	Laval	3	4	7
W1	McMaster	5	7	12

Note: * denotes overtime period(s)

=== WCIAA season ===
Seed	School	Standings
1	British Columbia	8–1–1
2	Saskatchewan	7–4–1
3	Alberta	6–6–0
4	Manitoba	0–10–0

No playoff

== University Cup ==
1962–63 McMaster Marlins, national champions

The CIAU invited the champions of four conferences to play for the inaugural tournament. The OIAA champion, Ryerson, was not invited as the league was not considered to be on par with the other four. No official seedings were awarded for the tournament.

Team	Qualification	Record
British Columbia Thunderbirds	WCIAA Champion	8–1–1
McMaster Marlins	QOAA Champion	14–0–0
Sherbrooke Vert et Or	OSLC Champion	13–3–0
St. Francis Xavier X-Men	MIAA Champion	11–3–1

=== Bracket ===
Semifinals; March 15
McMaster	4
St. Francis Xavier	3
British Columbia	6
Sherbrooke	2

Championship; March 16
McMaster	3
British Columbia	2
Third Place
St. Francis Xavier	7
Sherbrooke	4

Note: * denotes overtime period(s)

== Championship final ==
March 16, 1963	McMaster Marlins	3–2	British Columbia Thunderbirds	Jock Harty Arena, Kingston, Ontario
