= Lethbridge Pronghorns men's ice hockey =

- University: University of Lethbridge
- First season: 1973–74
- Arena: Lethbridge, Alberta
- Colors: Blue and Gold

U Sports tournament champions
- 1994

U Sports tournament appearances
- 1994, 2019

Conference tournament champions
- 1994

Conference regular season champions
- 1994

The Lethbridge Pronghorns men's ice hockey team was an ice hockey team representing the Lethbridge Pronghorns athletics program of University of Lethbridge. The team competed in U Sports from 1985 until 2020.

== History ==
Lethbridge first sponsored varsity ice hockey at the intermediate (2nd tier) level in 1973. The Pronghorns played in the Alberta Colleges Athletic Conference (ACAC), however, after two disappointing seasons the program was discontinued. About a decade later, the team was resurrected, this time at the senior level as a member of Canada West. Lethbridge floundered at or near the bottom of the conference for several years, however, the team finally began to show signs of life in the early 90s.

In 1993, the school was close to ending the program for a second time but instead decided to give it one more chance. The team brought in a young coach named Mike Babcock whose most recent experience had been getting fired after an unsuccessful two-year stint with the Moose Jaw Warriors. In his first season behind the bench, Babcock led the team to a regular season title as well as their first ever postseason appearance. Lethbridge then eked out several close wins to capture the league championship and their first berth in the University Cup. In their debut, the team was set against defending national champion Acadia and starting netminder Trevor Kruger had one of his worse performances of the season. Though the Pronghorns surrendered 6 goals in the game, the offense came through with 9 markers to send the team to the championship. Kruger recovered for the final and led the team to a 5–2 win for the national championship.

The stunning turnaround not only saved the program but helped resurrect Babcock's coaching career. Babcock was back in the Western Hockey League the following year and Lethbridge was forced to figure out how to build on their unexpected title without him. A few middling seasons followed but, as the years went on, the championship became a distant memory. By 2004, the program was back at the bottom of the conference and finished dead-last eight times over a 17-year stretch. Despite their lack of success, the Pronghorns were selected as the host for the 2019 University Cup. Unlike their first appearance, Lethbridge entered with a losing record and no expectation of success. They lived up to those predictions with a 1–7 loss in the quarterfinals.

After the end of the succeeding season, the university announced that, due to funding cuts from the provincial government, both the men's and women's ice hockey teams would be eliminated. The two programs were not the only sacrifices made by the school, who also indicated that future cuts would need to be made as further reductions were expected in the near future.

== Season-by-season results ==
Note: GP = Games played, W = Wins, L = Losses, T = Ties, OTL = Overtime Losses, SOL = Shootout Losses, Pts = Points

U Sports Champion	U Sports Semifinalist	Conference regular season champions	Conference Division Champions	Conference Playoff Champions

Season	Conference	Regular Season													Conference Tournament Results	National Tournament Results
Season	Conference	Conference								Overall					Conference Tournament Results	National Tournament Results
Season	Conference	GP	W	L	T	OTL	SOL	Pts*	Finish	GP	W	L	T	%	Conference Tournament Results	National Tournament Results
1973–74	ACAC	24	6	18	0	–	–	12	6th	24	6	18	0	.250		
1974–75	ACAC	24	4	20	0	–	–	8	6th	24	4	20	0	.167		
Program Suspended
1984–85	Canada West	24	4	20	0	–	–	8	5th	24	4	20	0	.167		
1985–86	Canada West	28	6	22	0	–	–	12	8th	28	6	22	0	.214		
1986–87	Canada West	28	6	22	0	–	–	12	8th	28	6	22	0	.214		
1987–88	Canada West	28	6	21	1	–	–	13	7th	28	6	21	1	.232		
1988–89	Canada West	28	3	25	0	–	–	6	8th	28	3	25	0	.107		
1989–90	Canada West	28	1	25	2	–	–	4	8th	28	1	25	2	.071		
1990–91	Canada West	28	10	18	0	–	–	20	7th	28	10	18	0	.357		
1991–92	Canada West	28	12	13	3	–	–	27	5th	28	12	13	3	.482		
1992–93	Canada West	28	9	16	3	–	–	21	6th	28	9	16	3	.375		
1993–94	Canada West	28	19	7	2	–	–	40	1st	36	25	9	2	.722	Won Semifinal series, 2–1 (Regina); Won Championship series, 2–1 (Calgary)	Won Semifinal, 9–6 (Acadia); Won Championship, 5–2 (Guelph)
1994–95	Canada West	28	14	13	1	–	–	29	4th	30	14	15	1	.483	Lost Semifinal series, 0–2 (Calgary)	
1995–96	Canada West	28	14	11	3	–	–	31	4th	31	15	13	3	.532	Lost Division Semifinal series, 1–2 (Alberta)	
1996–97	Canada West	26	8	16	2	–	–	18	5th	29	9	18	2	.345	Lost Division Semifinal series, 1–2 (Alberta)	
1997–98	Canada West	28	8	15	5	–	–	21	T–6th	28	8	15	5	.375		
1998–99	Canada West	28	13	13	2	–	–	28	5th	31	14	15	2	.484	Lost Division Semifinal series, 1–2 (Calgary)	
1999–00	Canada West	28	12	14	2	–	–	26	4th	30	12	16	2	.433	Lost Division Semifinal series, 0–2 (Calgary)	
2000–01	Canada West	28	11	14	3	–	–	25	5th	31	12	16	3	.435	Lost Division Semifinal series, 0–2 (Calgary)	
2001–02	Canada West	28	9	14	5	–	–	23	6th	30	9	16	5	.383	Lost Quarterfinal series, 0–2 (Calgary)	
2002–03	Canada West	28	10	16	2	–	–	22	6th	31	11	18	2	.387	Lost Division Semifinal series, 1–2 (Calgary)	
2003–04	Canada West	28	4	20	4	–	–	12	7th	28	4	20	4	.214		
2004–05	Canada West	28	3	23	2	–	–	8	7th	28	3	23	2	.143		
2005–06	Canada West	28	4	20	4	–	–	12	8th	28	4	20	4	.214		
2006–07	Canada West	28	14	9	–	5	–	33	3rd	31	15	16	0	.484	Lost Division Semifinal series, 1–2 (British Columbia)	
2007–08	Canada West	28	9	18	–	1	–	19	7th	28	9	19	0	.321		
2008–09	Canada West	28	14	13	–	0	1	29	4th	31	15	15	1	.500	Lost Quarterfinal series, 1–2 (British Columbia)	
2009–10	Canada West	28	13	11	–	2	2	30	5th	28	13	13	2	.500		
2010–11	Canada West	28	13	10	–	2	3	31	5th	28	13	12	3	.518		
2011–12	Canada West	28	7	18	–	3	0	17	7th	28	7	21	0	.250		
2012–13	Canada West	28	2	22	–	4	0	8	8th	28	2	26	0	.071		
2013–14	Canada West	28	4	21	–	2	1	11	8th	28	4	23	1	.161		
2014–15	Canada West	28	5	23	–	0	0	10	8th	28	5	23	0	.179		
2015–16	Canada West	28	11	15	–	2	0	24	7th	28	11	17	0	.393		
2016–17	Canada West	28	11	14	–	3	0	25	7th	28	11	17	0	.393		
2017–18	Canada West	28	9	16	–	3	0	21	7th	28	9	19	0	.321		
2018–19	Canada West	28	9	17	–	2	0	20	6th	31	9	22	0	.290	Lost Quarterfinal series, 0–2 (Calgary)	Lost Quarterfinal, 1–7 (Alberta)
2019–20	Canada West	28	5	20	–	2	1	13	8th	28	5	22	1	.196		
Program Suspended
Totals										GP	W	L	T/SOL	%	Championships	
Regular Season										1051	323	674	54	.333	1 Canada West Championship	
Conference Post-season										34	10	24	0	.294	1 Canada West Championship	
U Sports Postseason										3	2	1	0	.280	2 National tournament appearances	
Regular Season and Postseason Record										1088	335	699	54	.333	1 National Championship	

Totals include games since 1984.
Note: Games not counted towards University Cup appearances are not included.
