= UBC Thunderbirds men's ice hockey =

- University: University of British Columbia
- Conference: Canada West
- Head coach: Sven Butenschön; Since 2016–17 season
- Assistant coaches: Matt Revel; Kevin Seibel; Noah Form
- Arena: Thunderbird Sports Centre; Vancouver, British Columbia
- Colors: Blue and Gold

U Sports tournament appearances
- 1963, 1971, 1977, 2020, 2022, 2024

Conference tournament champions
- 1971, 2024

Conference regular season champions
- 1963, 2024

The UBC Thunderbirds men's ice hockey team is an ice hockey team representing the UBC Thunderbirds athletics program of University of British Columbia. The team is a member of the Canada West Universities Athletic Association conference and compete in U Sports. The Thunderbirds play their home games at the Thunderbird Sports Centre in Vancouver, British Columbia.

== History ==
As many Canadian college did in the early part of the 20th century, the UBC Thunderbirds began playing in a local senior league. By at last 1916, the Thunderbirds playing members of the Vancouver City Senior League (VCSL) though whether or not the team was officially sanctioned by the school at that time is uncertain. What is known is that UBC was a full member after World War I and won both the league and provincial senior championship in 1921. Normally, this would have given the team the ability to compete for the Allan Cup, the national senior championship, however, the provincial playoffs were held at the same time as the Allan Cup regionals (early March) and UBC's title came too late for them to qualify.

UBC continued to play senior hockey until the late 20s when the VCSL dissolved. They both resurfaced in 1931 for one final season before the league disbanded for good. UBC's ice hockey team played just one official season from 1932 until 1945, joining the short-lived Pacific Coast Intermediate Hockey League (PCIHL) for its inaugural season in 1938–39. It wasn't until after World War II that a concerted effort was made to revive the program. The team tried various ideas; playing as an independent outfit, joining senior leagues, etc... however, the team had yet to play an intercollegiate game. This was primarily due to remote locale of the Thunderbirds. At the time, the nearest fellow college that sponsored varsity ice hockey was Alberta, some 1,000 kilometers away. Despite the distance, the two schools agreed to start an annual competition in 1949 and award the Hamber Trophy to the champion. UBC won the inaugural series, however, Alberta took the next twelve titles. Despite UBC's inability to win a second championship, the Hamber series proved to be the most consistent competition for the team until the early 60s.

In 1961, UBC joined the Western Canadian Intercollegiate Athletic Union (WCIAU) a collection of colleges in Western Canada. At the time, the only other members were Alberta and Saskatchewan but joining the league still required a sizable financial investment in the program. After going winless in their first season of play, the league rebranded as the Western Canadian Intercollegiate Athletic Association (WCIAA) and was one of four leagues to receive invitations to send their champion to the University Cup. Surprisingly, UBC rose to the challenge and won the league's inaugural championship. The Thunderbirds then won their national semi-final to appear in the first University Cup championship game, however, they fell 2–3 to McMaster.

Despite the team's success, the team was forced to leave the WCIAA in 1964 as travel expenses had ballooned. Two years later, UBC rejoined the league and appeared to have addressed the financial issues at least in the short term. The Thunderbirds won their second league championship in 1971 but lost to eventually champion Toronto in the University Cup semi-finals. A year later, to cut down on travel expenses for all schools, the WCIAA was split into two conferences. UBC was one of four teams that were founding members of the Canada West Universities Athletic Association. Over the succeeding 30 years, UBC found it very difficult to make a name for itself in the conference. The Thunderbirds made just 6 playoff appearances from 1974 to 2004 Their lone trip to the national tournament in 1977 came as a result of being the league runner-up at the time Canada West possessed a rotating wild-card bid. Even after the team was able to get in on the playoff chase, UBC didn't make a single appearance in the finals until 2020. By then, the University Cup field had expanded to allow both league finalists entry and the program was able to end its 43-year drought. Unfortunately, the team's timing could not have been worse and the COVID-19 pandemic forced the cancellation of the series before UBC had played a single game.

After the entire 2020–21 season was cancelled, UBC got a second chance to make its tournament return and made it appear that the program had turned a corner. The following season the team won 20 conference games for the first time in its history but were knocked out in the league semi-finals. 2023–24 proved to be even better for the Thunderbirds as the team won its first regular season championship since 1963 and first ever Canada West title.

== Season-by-season results ==
=== Senior and collegiate play ===
Note: GP = Games played, W = Wins, L = Losses, T = Ties, Pts = Points

Extra-League Champion	Extra-League Semi-finalist	Conference regular season champions	Conference Division Champions	Conference Playoff Champions

Season	Conference	Regular Season											Conference Tournament Results	National Tournament Results
Season	Conference	Conference						Overall					Conference Tournament Results	National Tournament Results
Season	Conference	GP	W	L	T	Pts*	Finish	GP	W	L	T	%	Conference Tournament Results	National Tournament Results
Senior Hockey
1916–17	VCSL	?	?	?	?	?	?	?	?	?	?	?		
1917–18	?	?	?	?	?	?	?	?	?	?	?	?		
1918–19	VCSL	6	4	2	0	8	2nd	?	?	?	?	?		
1919–20	VCSL	6	4	2	0	8	2nd	?	?	?	?	?	Lost Championship, 2–3 (Vancouver Nationals)	
1920–21	VCSL	6	2	4	0	4	3rd	?	?	?	?	?	Won Semi-final, 1–0 (Vancouver Monarchs); Won Championship series, 6–5 (Vancouver Towers)	Won Provincial Championship series, 7–6 (Victoria Senators)
1921–22	VCSL	6	3	3	0	6	3rd	?	?	?	?	?	Lost Semi-final, ?	
1922–23	VCSL	6	1	1	4	6	4th	?	?	?	?	?	Lost Championship, ?	
1923–24	VCSL	4	2	2	0	6	2nd	?	?	?	?	?	Lost Semi-final, ?	
1924–25	VCSL	4	1	3	0	2	3rd	?	?	?	?	?	Lost Semi-final, ?	
1925–26	VCSL	4	0	4	0	0	3rd	?	?	?	?	?		
1926–27	VCSL	3	1	1	1	3	3rd	?	?	?	?	?	Lost Semi-final, ?	
1927–28	VCSL	4	1	3	0	2	2nd	?	?	?	?	?		
Program suspended
1931–32	VCSL	6	2	3	1	5	3rd	?	?	?	?	?		
Program suspended
1938–39	PCIHL	9	3	6	0	6	3rd	?	?	?	?	?		
Program suspended
1945–46	?	?	?	?	?	?	?	?	?	?	?	?		Lost Provincial Semi-final series 1–2 (New Westminster)
1946–47	?	?	?	?	?	?	?	?	?	?	?	?		
1947–48	PCSBHL	14	5	9	0	10	4th	?	?	?	?	?	Lost Semi-final series, 1–2 (Nanaimo Clippers)	
1948–49	PCSBHL	16	9	6	1	19	2nd	?	?	?	?	?	Won Semi-final series, 9–8 (Vancouver Indians); Lost Championship series, 2–4 (Nanaimo Clippers)	
1949–50	Independent	?	?	?	?	?	?	?	?	?	?	?		
1950–51	Independent	?	?	?	?	?	?	?	?	?	?	?		Won Pacific Coast Championship series, 1–2 (Nanaimo Native Sons); Lost Provincial Semi-final, forfeit (ruled ineligible)
1951–52	Independent	?	?	?	?	?	?	?	?	?	?	?		
1952–53	Independent	?	?	?	?	?	?	?	?	?	?	?		
1953–54	Independent	?	?	?	?	?	?	?	?	?	?	?		
1954–55	Independent	?	?	?	?	?	?	?	?	?	?	?		
1955–56	Independent	?	?	?	?	?	?	?	?	?	?	?		
1956–57	VIMHL	3	0	3	0	0	T–3rd	?	?	?	?	?		
1957–58	Independent	?	?	?	?	?	?	?	?	?	?	?		
1958–59	Independent	?	?	?	?	?	?	?	?	?	?	?		
1959–60	Independent	?	?	?	?	?	?	?	?	?	?	?		
1960–61	Independent	?	?	?	?	?	?	?	?	?	?	?		
1961–62	WCIAU	8	0	8	0	0	3rd	?	?	?	?	?		
Totals								GP	W	L	T	%	Championships	
Regular Season								?	?	?	?	?		
Conference Post-season								?	?	?	?	?	1 VCSL Championship	
Regular Season and Postseason Record								?	?	?	?	?	1 British Columbia Senior Championship	

=== Collegiate only ===
Note: GP = Games played, W = Wins, L = Losses, T = Ties, OTL = Overtime Losses, SOL = Shootout Losses, Pts = Points

U Sports Champion	U Sports Semi-finalist	Conference regular season champions	Conference Division Champions	Conference Playoff Champions

Season	Conference	Regular Season													Conference Tournament Results	National Tournament Results
Season	Conference	Conference								Overall					Conference Tournament Results	National Tournament Results
Season	Conference	GP	W	L	T	OTL	SOL	Pts*	Finish	GP	W	L	T	%	Conference Tournament Results	National Tournament Results
1962–63	WCIAA	10	8	1	1	–	–	17	1st	12	9	2	1	.792		Won Semi-final, 6–2 (Sherbrooke); Lost Championship, 2–3 (McMaster)
1963–64	WCIAA	12	6	6	0	–	–	12	T–2nd	12	6	6	0	.500		
1964–65	Independent	?	?	?	?	?	?	?	?	?	?	?	?	?		
1965–66	Independent	?	?	?	?	?	?	?	?	?	?	?	?	?		
1966–67	WCIAA	15	6	9	0	–	–	12	4th	15	6	9	0	.400		
1967–68	WCIAA	16	7	9	0	–	–	14	4th	16	7	9	0	.438		
1968–69	WCIAA	20	10	10	0	–	–	20	T–4th	20	10	10	0	.500		
1969–70	WCIAA	14	8	6	0	–	–	22	2nd	16	8	8	0	.500	Lost Semi-final series, 0–2 (Calgary)	
1970–71	WCIAA	20	15	5	0	–	–	30	2nd	27	20	7	0	.741	Won Semi-final series, 2–1 (Calgary); Won Championship series, 2–0 (Manitoba)	Lost Semi-final, 2–3 (Toronto); Won Consolation Semi-final, 6–4 (Loyola); Lost Consolation Final, 4–7 (Laurentian)
1971–72	WCIAA	20	14	6	0	–	–	28	3rd	20	14	6	0	.700		
1972–73	Canada West	24	16	8	0	–	–	32	T–2nd	24	16	8	0	.667		
1973–74	Canada West	18	9	9	0	–	–	18	3rd	18	9	9	0	.500		
1974–75	Canada West	24	12	11	1	–	–	25	2nd	27	13	13	1	.500	Lost Championship series, 1–2 (Alberta)	
1975–76	Canada West	24	12	12	0	–	–	24	3rd	24	12	12	0	.500		
1976–77	Canada West	24	14	10	0	–	–	28	2nd	29	16	13	0	.552	Lost Championship series, 1–2 (Alberta)	Lost Semi-final series, 10–11 (Toronto)
1977–78	Canada West	24	14	10	0	–	–	28	2nd	27	15	12	0	.556	Lost Championship series, 1–2 (Alberta)	
1978–79	Canada West	24	7	17	0	–	–	14	3rd	24	7	17	0	.292		
1979–80	Canada West	29	12	17	0	–	–	24	4th	29	12	17	0	.414		
1980–81	Canada West	24	5	19	0	–	–	10	4th	24	5	19	0	.208		
1981–82	Canada West	24	6	18	0	–	–	12	4th	24	6	18	0	.250		
1982–83	Canada West	24	9	15	0	–	–	18	4th	24	9	15	0	.375		
1983–84	Canada West	24	3	21	0	–	–	6	4th	24	3	21	0	.125		
1984–85	Canada West	24	12	12	0	–	–	24	3rd	24	12	12	0	.500		
1985–86	Canada West	28	12	16	0	–	–	24	6th	28	12	16	0	.429		
1986–87	Canada West	28	9	17	2	–	–	20	5th	28	9	17	2	.357		
1987–88	Canada West	28	10	16	2	–	–	22	5th	28	10	16	2	.393		
1988–89	Canada West	28	13	14	1	–	–	27	5th	28	13	14	1	.482		
1989–90	Canada West	28	16	11	1	–	–	33	3rd	30	16	13	1	.550	Lost Semi-final series, 0–2 (Alberta)	
1990–91	Canada West	28	8	15	5	–	–	21	6th	28	8	15	5	.375		
1991–92	Canada West	28	11	14	3	–	–	25	7th	28	11	14	3	.446		
1992–93	Canada West	28	7	19	2	–	–	16	7th	28	7	19	2	.286		
1993–94	Canada West	28	7	17	4	–	–	18	6th	28	7	17	4	.321		
1994–95	Canada West	28	10	13	5	–	–	25	6th	28	10	13	5	.446		
1995–96	Canada West	28	9	17	2	–	–	20	7th	28	9	17	2	.357		
1996–97	Canada West	26	7	16	3	–	–	17	6th	26	7	16	3	.327		
1997–98	Canada West	28	9	15	4	–	–	22	6th	31	10	17	4	.387	Lost Division Semi-final series, 1–2 (Calgary)	
1998–99	Canada West	28	7	18	3	–	–	17	7th	28	7	18	3	.304		
1999–00	Canada West	28	5	19	4	–	–	14	7th	28	5	19	4	.250		
2000–01	Canada West	28	6	19	3	–	–	15	7th	28	6	19	3	.268		
2001–02	Canada West	28	5	19	4	–	–	14	7th	28	5	19	4	.250		
2002–03	Canada West	28	5	23	0	–	–	10	7th	28	5	23	0	.179		
2003–04	Canada West	28	7	19	2	–	–	16	6th	31	8	21	2	.290	Lost Division Semi-final series, 1–2 (Calgary)	
2004–05	Canada West	28	5	17	6	–	–	16	6th	30	5	19	6	.267	Lost Division Semi-final series, 0–2 (Calgary)	
2005–06	Canada West	28	12	15	1	–	–	25	5th	31	13	17	1	.435	Lost Division Semi-final series, 1–2 (Calgary)	
2006–07	Canada West	28	14	13	–	1	–	29	T–4th	33	16	17	0	.485	Won Division Semi-final series, 2–1 (Lethbridge); Lost Division Final series, 0–2 (Alberta)	
2007–08	Canada West	28	12	16	–	0	–	24	5th	30	12	18	0	.400	Won Quarter-final series, 0–2 (Manitoba)	
2008–09	Canada West	28	11	14	–	1	2	25	5th	33	13	18	2	.424	Won Division Semi-final series, 2–1 (Lethbridge); Lost Division Final series, 0–2 (Saskatchewan)	
2009–10	Canada West	28	8	19	–	0	1	17	7th	28	8	19	1	.304		
2010–11	Canada West	28	11	12	–	4	1	27	6th	28	11	16	1	.411		
2011–12	Canada West	28	12	12	–	1	3	28	5th	31	13	15	3	.468	Lost Semi-final series, 1–2 (Calgary)	
2012–13	Canada West	28	14	11	–	1	2	31	5th	31	15	14	2	.516	Lost Semi-final series, 1–2 (Calgary)	
2013–14	Canada West	28	11	15	–	2	0	24	T–6th	33	13	20	0	.394	Won Quarter-final series, 2–1 (Saskatchewan); Lost Semi-final series, 0–2 (Alberta)	
2014–15	Canada West	28	13	10	–	5	0	31	4th	33	15	18	0	.455	Won Quarter-final series, 2–1 (Manitoba); Lost Semi-final series, 0–2 (Alberta)	
2015–16	Canada West	28	11	13	–	4	0	26	6th	30	11	19	0	.367	Lost Quarter-final series, 0–2 (Mount Royal)	
2016–17	Canada West	28	12	13	–	2	1	27	6th	30	12	17	1	.417	Lost Quarter-final series, 0–2 (Calgary)	
2017–18	Canada West	28	16	10	–	2	0	34	4th	31	17	14	0	.548	Lost Quarter-final series, 1–2 (Calgary)	
2018–19	Canada West	28	14	12	–	2	0	30	4th	30	14	16	0	.467	Lost Quarter-final series, 0–2 (Mount Royal)	
2019–20	Canada West	28	9	14	–	4	1	23	5th	36	13	22	1	.375	Won Quarter-final series, 2–1 (Mount Royal); Won Semi-final series, 2–1 (Alberta); Lost Championship series, 0–2 (Saskatchewan)	No contest Quarter-final, cancelled (New Brunswick)
2020–21	Season cancelled due to COVID-19 pandemic															
2021–22	Canada West	20	14	5	–	1	0	29	2nd	25	16	9	0	.640	Won Semi-final series, 2–0 (Mount Royal); Lost Championship series, 0–2 (Alberta)	Lost Quarter-final, 1–2 (OT) (Quebec–Trois-Rivières)
2022–23	Canada West	28	20	6	–	1	1	42	3rd	33	23	9	1	.712	Won Quarter-final series, 2–0 (Regina); Lost Semi-final series, 1–2 (Alberta)	
2023–24	Canada West	28	22	4	–	1	1	46	1st	35	26	8	1	.757	Won Semi-final series, 2–1 (Alberta); Won Championship series, 2–1 (Calgary)	Lost Quarter-final, 2–3 (McGill)
Totals										GP	W	L	T/SOL	%	Championships	
Regular Season										1491	609	810	72	.433	1 WCIAA Championship, 1 Canada West Championship	
Conference Post-season										89	34	55	0	.382	1 WCIAA Championship, 1 Canada West Championship	
U Sports Postseason										9	3	6	0	.333	6 National tournament appearances	
Regular Season and Postseason Record										1589	646	871	72	.429		

Totals include games since 1962–63 except for 1964–65 and 1965–66.
Note: Games not counted towards University Cup appearances are not included.

== See also ==
UBC Thunderbirds women's ice hockey
