= Manitoba Bisons men's ice hockey =

University of Manitoba men's ice hockey team

- University: University of Manitoba
- Conference: Canada West
- Head coach: Gordon Burnett; Since 2023–24 season
- Assistant coaches: Ryan Bonni; Devin Himpe; Byron Spriggs; Kyle Prystupa
- Arena: Wayne Fleming Arena; Winnipeg, Manitoba
- Colors: Brown and Gold

U Sports tournament champions
- 1965

U Sports tournament appearances
- 1965, 1976, 1977, 1984, 1985, 2005, 2010

Conference tournament champions
- 1922, 1924, 1984, 1985

Conference regular season champions
- 1920, 1965, 1971, 1976, 1977, 1984, 1985, 2012

The Manitoba Bisons men's ice hockey team is an ice hockey team representing the Manitoba Bisons athletics program of University of Manitoba. The team is a member of the Canada West Universities Athletic Association conference and compete in U Sports. The Bisons play their home games at the Wayne Fleming Arena in Winnipeg, Manitoba.

== History ==
Manitoba iced its first varsity ice hockey team in 1908, roughly around the same time that other schools in Western Canada were laying the foundation for college hockey in the region. For the first few years, the team played out of the provincial senior league, winning the Pattison Cup in 1910. The club issued a challenge for the Allan Cup, the national amateur championship, but administrative delays and financial problems eventually forced the team to withdraw their bid. The Bisons continued with senior hockey for a few years before withdrawing from the provincial league in 1912.

After World War I, Manitoba began to sponsor a junior and senior team. The junior squad played out of the Winnipeg and District Junior Hockey League and won the Memorial Cup in 1923 as national junior champions. The program continued until 1937. Meanwhile, the senior club became founding members of the Western Canadian Intercollegiate Athletic Union (WCIAU) in 1919. Unfortunately, due to travel expenses, the league was reduced to just a few games between Manitoba and Saskatchewan after the first year. The team played intermittently over the next 20 years but still managed to capture the 1928 Allan Cup, becoming the only university to win both a senior and junior national championship.

Due to budgetary issues, travel costs and World War II, Manitoba played only two seasons of varsity hockey from 1937 to 1956. When the program finally found some stability in the late 50s, they remained with the WCIAU until 1961. A year later, the league was rebranded as the Western Canadian Intercollegiate Athletic Association for the inception of a national collegiate tournament in 1963 and Manitoba resurfaced. The Bisons made their first appearance for the third series and won two lopsided games to capture a third different national title for the program. Unfortunately, success was fleeting for Manitoba and the team was unable to secure a second WCIAA championship.

In 1972, citing travel expenses as the primary reason, the WCIAA was split into two separate leagues. Manitoba found itself in the Great Plains Athletic Association (soon to be called Great Plains Athletic Conference) and found it road back to the tournament had become much easier. Over the succeeding 13 years, the Bisons won the league title four times, however, they were only able to win one out of eight University Cup games and never advanced out of the opening round. Manitoba's final GPAC title came in 1985, the final year of conference play. That summer, the league was reduced to just three teams. With their automatic qualifier in jeopardy, the remaining programs were all absorbed into Canada West. As of 2024, Manitoba has yet to win a single Canada West championship, however, they have managed to secure two bids to the national tournament. In both 2005 and 2010, the Bisons finished second in their Round-robin pools.

== Season-by-season results ==
=== Senior, junior and collegiate play ===
Note: GP = Games played, W = Wins, L = Losses, T = Ties, Pts = Points

Extra-League Champion	National Semifinalist	Conference regular season champions	Conference Division Champions	Conference Playoff Champions

Season	Conference	Regular Season											Conference Tournament Results	National Tournament Results
Season	Conference	Conference						Overall					Conference Tournament Results	National Tournament Results
Season	Conference	GP	W	L	T	Pts*	Finish	GP	W	L	T	%	Conference Tournament Results	National Tournament Results
1908–09	Manitoba Sr.	7	4	3	0	8	2nd	?	?	?	?	?		
1909–10	Manitoba Sr.	8	6	2	0	12	1st	?	?	?	?	?		Withdrew Allan Cup challenge
1910–11	Manitoba Sr.	5	2	3	0	4	2nd	?	?	?	?	?		
1911–12	Manitoba Sr.	7	4	3	0	8	2nd	?	?	?	?	?		
1912–13	Independent	?	?	?	?	?	?	?	?	?	?	?		
1913–14	Independent	?	?	?	?	?	?	?	?	?	?	?		
1914–15	Independent	?	?	?	?	?	?	?	?	?	?	?		
Program suspended due to World War I
1919–20	WCIAU	4	3	1	0	6	1st	?	?	?	?	?		
1920–21	WCIAU	0	0	0	0	0	—	?	?	?	?	?	Lost Championship series, 5–9 (Saskatchewan)	
1921–22	WJrHL	8	5	1	2	12	2nd	?	?	?	?	?	Won Division Final series, 9–5 (Winnipeg Columbus Club); Won Championship series, 9–6 (Winnipeg Tammany Tigers)	Won Turnbull Cup series, 2–0 (Brandon); Lost Abbott Cup Championship series, 4–6 (Regina Patricias)
1921–22	WCIAU	0	0	0	0	0	—	?	?	?	?	?	Won Championship series, 9–6 (Saskatchewan)	Lost Western Quarterfinal series, 7–13 (Brandon Hockey Club)
1922–23	WJrHL	9	7	1	1	15	2nd	?	?	?	?	?	Won Championship series, 10–0 (Winnipeg Victoria Bisons)	Won Turnbull Cup Championship, 17–1 (Boissevain), 8–1 (Brandon Tigers); Won Abbott Cup Championship series, 10–7 (Calgary Canadians); Won Memorial Cup Western Final series, 9–4 (Fort William Cubs); Won Memorial Cup Championship series, 14–6 (Kitchener Colts)
1922–23	WCIAU	0	0	0	0	0	—	?	?	?	?	?	Lost Championship, forfeit (Saskatchewan)	
1923–24	WJrHL	8	3	4	1	7	3rd	?	?	?	?	?		
1923–24	Manitoba Sr.	12	5	7	0	10	4th	?	?	?	?	?		
1923–24	WCIAU	0	0	0	0	0	—	?	?	?	?	?	Won Championship, 8–1 (Saskatchewan)	
1924–25	WJrHL	9	9	0	0	18	1st	?	?	?	?	?	Won Division Final, 8–3 (St. Vital Greyhounds); Won Championship series, 5–2 (Winnipeg Tammany Tigers)	Won Turnbull Cup series, 11–3 (Portage la Prairie Victorias); Lost Abbott Cup Quarterfinal series, 11–13 (Regina Patricias)
1925–26	WJrHL	7	2	4	1	5	5th	?	?	?	?	?		
1925–26	WDIHL	8	2	5	1	5	T–3rd	?	?	?	?	?		
1926–27	WJrHL	8	2	5	1	5	7th	?	?	?	?	?		
1927–28	WJrHL	4	1	1	2	3	4th	?	?	?	?	?		
1927–28	Manitoba-Thunder Bay	11	6	4	1	13	2nd	?	?	?	?	?	Won Pattison Cup, ?	Won Allan Cup Semifinal series, 10–0 (Trail Smoke Eaters); Won Allan Cup Championship series, 1–2 (Montreal Victorias)
1928–29	WJrHL	6	3	2	1	7	3rd	?	?	?	?	?		
1928–29	Manitoba-Thunder Bay	11	8	2	1	17	1st	?	?	?	?	?	Lost Pattison Cup, ?	
1929–30	WJrHL	9	5	4	0	10	T–1st	?	?	?	?	?	Lost Championship series, 0–2 (Elmwood Millionaires)	
1930–31	WJrHL	12	5	7	0	10	5th	?	?	?	?	?		
1931–32	WJrHL	11	2	8	1	5	4th	?	?	?	?	?		
1932–33	WJrHL	11	2	9	0	4	8th	?	?	?	?	?		
1933–34	MJHL	11	9	1	1	19	1st	?	?	?	?	?	Won B Division Final series, 2–0 (Elmwood Maple Leafs); Lost Championship series, 1–2–1 (Kenora Thistles)	
1934–35	MJHL	12	3	9	0	10	8th	?	?	?	?	?		
1935–36	MJHL	15	6	8	1	13	T–6th	?	?	?	?	?		
1936–37	MJHL	16	2	14	0	4	9th	?	?	?	?	?		
Program suspended
1939–40	WCIAU	8	1	6	1	3	3rd	?	?	?	?	?		
Program suspended
1946–47	WCIAU	4	2	2	0	8	2nd	?	?	?	?	?		
Program suspended
1956–57	WCIAU	8 ^{†}	6	2	0	12	2nd ^{†}	?	?	?	?	?		
1957–58	WCIAU	12	3	9	0	6	3rd	?	?	?	?	?		
1958–59	WCIAU	8	2	6	0	4	3rd	?	?	?	?	?		
1959–60	WCIAU	8	4	4	0	8	2nd	?	?	?	?	?		
1960–61	WCIAU	8	0	7	1	1	3rd	?	?	?	?	?		
Program suspended
Totals								GP	W	L	T	%	Championships	
Regular Season								?	?	?	?	?	3 WJrHL Division Titles, 2 WJrHL Championships, 1 MJHL Championship, 1 Manitoba Sr. Championship, 1 Manitoba-Thunder Bay Championship, 1 WCIAU Championship	
Conference Post-season								?	?	?	?	?	2 WCIAU Championships, 3 WJrHL Championships, 1 Pattison Cup	
Regular Season and Postseason Record								?	?	?	?	?	3 Turnbull Cups, 1 Abbott Cup, 1 Allan Cup, 1 Memorial Cup	

† Manitoba cancelled its final four games due to poor ice conditions and travel problems.

=== Collegiate only ===
Note: GP = Games played, W = Wins, L = Losses, T = Ties, OTL = Overtime Losses, SOL = Shootout Losses, Pts = Points

U Sports Champion	U Sports Semifinalist	Conference regular season champions	Conference Division Champions	Conference Playoff Champions

Season	Conference	Regular Season													Conference Tournament Results	National Tournament Results
Season	Conference	Conference								Overall					Conference Tournament Results	National Tournament Results
Season	Conference	GP	W	L	T	OTL	SOL	Pts*	Finish	GP	W	L	T	%	Conference Tournament Results	National Tournament Results
1962–63	WCIAA	10	0	10	0	–	–	0	4th	10	0	10	0	.000		
1963–64	WCIAA	12	6	6	0	–	–	12	T–2nd	12	6	6	0	.500		
1964–65	WCIAA	12	10	2	0	–	–	20	1st	14	12	2	0	.857		Won Semifinal, 10–4 (Laurentian); Won Championship, 9–2 (Saint Dunstan's)
1965–66	WCIAA	12	8	4	0	–	–	16	2nd	12	8	4	0	.667		
1966–67	WCIAA	16	8	8	0	–	–	16	3rd	16	8	8	0	.500		
1967–68	WCIAA	16	10	6	0	–	–	20	T–2nd	16	10	6	0	.625		
1968–69	WCIAA	20	10	10	0	–	–	20	T–4th	20	10	10	0	.500		
1969–70	WCIAA	14	9	5	0	–	–	18	3rd	16	9	7	0	.563	Lost Semifinal series, 0–2 (Alberta)	
1970–71	WCIAA	20	16	4	0	–	–	32	1st	24	18	6	0	.750	Won Semifinal series, 2–0 (Alberta); Lost Championship series, 0–2 (British Columbia)	
1971–72	WCIAA	20	8	12	0	–	–	16	T–5th	23	10	13	0	.435	Won Play-in series, 12–9 (Brandon); Lost Semifinal, 2–6 (Alberta)	
1972–73	GPAA	12	4	8	0	–	–	8	3rd	12	4	8	0	.333		
1973–74	GPAC	18	9	9	0	–	–	18	3rd	18	9	9	0	.500		
1974–75	GPAC	22	13	8	1	–	–	27	2nd	22	13	8	1	.614		
1975–76	GPAC	18	11	7	0	–	–	22	1st	19	11	8	0	.579		Lost Regional Semifinal, 5–6 (Alberta)
1976–77	GPAC	23	17	6	0	–	–	34	1st	25	17	8	0	.680		Lost West Regional Final series, 0–2 (Toronto)
1977–78	GPAC	24	13	11	0	–	–	19	T–3rd	24	13	11	0	.542		
1978–79	GPAC	24	18	5	1	–	–	37	2nd	26	18	7	1	.712	Lost Championship series, 0–2 (Regina)	
1979–80	GPAC	20	12	7	1	–	–	25	2nd	21	12	8	1	.595	Lost Semifinal, 2–4 (Regina)	
1980–81	GPAC	24	16	8	0	–	–	32	2nd	27	17	10	0	.630	Won Semifinal, 5–3 (Regina); Lost Championship series, 0–2 (Brandon)	
1981–82	GPAC	24	8	13	3	–	–	19	3rd	25	8	14	3	.380	Lost Semifinal, 4–5 (Brandon)	
1982–83	GPAC	24	15	7	2	–	–	32	2nd	28	17	9	2	.643	Won Semifinal, 4–2 (Regina); Lost Championship series, 1–2 (Brandon)	
1983–84	GPAC	24	19	4	1	–	–	39	1st	29	21	7	1	.741	Won Championship series, 2–1 (Brandon)	Lost West Regional Final, 0–2 (Alberta)
1984–85	GPAC	24	17	3	4	–	–	38	1st	29	20	5	4	.759	Won Championship series, 2–0 (Regina)	Lost West Regional Final, 1–2 (Alberta)
1985–86	Canada West	28	18	10	0	–	–	36	3rd	31	19	12	0	.613	Lost Semifinal series, 1–2 (Calgary)	
1986–87	Canada West	28	17	10	1	–	–	35	3rd	31	18	12	1	.597	Lost Semifinal series, 1–2 (Saskatchewan)	
1987–88	Canada West	28	14	14	0	–	–	28	4th	31	15	16	0	.484	Lost Semifinal series, 1–2 (Calgary)	
1988–89	Canada West	28	16	9	3	–	–	35	4th	30	16	11	3	.583	Lost Semifinal series, 0–2 (Alberta)	
1989–90	Canada West	28	14	14	0	–	–	28	T–4th	28	14	14	0	.500		
1990–91	Canada West	28	11	15	2	–	–	24	5th	28	11	15	2	.429		
1991–92	Canada West	28	14	13	1	–	–	29	4th	30	14	15	1	.483	Lost Semifinal series, 0–2 (Regina)	
1992–93	Canada West	28	13	13	2	–	–	28	5th	28	13	13	2	.500		
1993–94	Canada West	28	11	12	5	–	–	27	5th	28	11	12	5	.482		
1994–95	Canada West	28	15	11	2	–	–	32	3rd	32	17	13	2	.563	Won Semifinal series, 2–0 (Regina); Lost Championship series, 0–2 (Calgary)	
1995–96	Canada West	28	16	10	2	–	–	32	2nd	31	17	12	2	.581	Lost Division Final series, 1–2 (Regina)	
1996–97	Canada West	26	12	11	3	–	–	25	4th	30	14	13	3	.517	Won Division Semifinal series, 2–0 (Regina); Lost Division Final series, 0–2 (Saskatchewan)	
1997–98	Canada West	28	14	7	7	–	–	35	3rd	33	17	9	7	.621	Won Division Semifinal series, 2–0 (Brandon); Lost Division Final series, 1–2 (Saskatchewan)	
1998–99	Canada West	28	13	11	4	–	–	30	4th	32	15	13	4	.531	Won Division Semifinal series, 2–0 (Brandon); Lost Division Final series, 0–2 (Saskatchewan)	
1999–00	Canada West	28	11	15	2	–	–	24	5th	30	11	17	2	.400	Lost Division Semifinal series, 0–2 (Brandon)	
2000–01	Canada West	28	17	8	3	–	–	37	2nd	33	19	11	3	.621	Won Division Final series, 2–1 (Saskatchewan); Lost Championship series, 0–2 (Alberta)	
2001–02	Canada West	28	14	12	2	–	–	30	4th	32	16	14	2	.531	Won Quarterfinal series, 2–0 (Regina); Lost Semifinal series, 0–2 (Alberta)	
2002–03	Canada West	28	12	13	3	–	–	27	4th	32	14	15	3	.484	Won Division Semifinal series, 2–0 (Regina); Lost Division Final series, 0–2 (Saskatchewan)	
2003–04	Canada West	28	8	14	6	–	–	22	5th	30	8	16	6	.367	Lost Division Semifinal series, 0–2 (Regina)	
2004–05	Canada West	28	15	8	5	–	–	35	3rd	36	20	11	5	.625	Won Division Semifinal series, 2–0 (Regina); Lost Semifinal series, 0–2 (Saskatchewan); Won Third Place series, 2–0 (Calgary)	Lost Pool A Round-robin, 1–5 (Alberta), 4–1 (Quebec–Trois-Rivières)
2005–06	Canada West	28	12	13	3	–	–	27	4th	33	14	16	3	.470	Won Division Semifinal series, 2–1 (Regina); Lost Semifinal series, 0–2 (Saskatchewan)	
2006–07	Canada West	28	10	16	–	2	–	22	7th	28	10	18	0	.357		
2007–08	Canada West	28	13	13	–	2	–	28	4th	32	15	17	0	.469	Won Quarterfinal series, 2–0 (British Columbia); Lost Semifinal series, 0–2 (Alberta)	
2008–09	Canada West	28	13	9	–	1	5	32	3rd	30	13	12	5	.517	Lost Quarterfinal series, 2–0 (Regina)	
2009–10	Canada West	28	16	10	–	0	2	34	3rd	35	20	13	2	.600	Won Semifinal series, 2–0 (Saskatchewan); Lost Championship series, 1–2 (Alberta)	Lost Pool B Round-robin, 5–4 (OT) (McGill), 0–5 (Saint Mary's)
2010–11	Canada West	28	13	9	–	3	3	32	4th	30	13	14	3	.483	Lost Semifinal series, 0–2 (Alberta)	
2011–12	Canada West	28	20	5	–	3	0	43	1st	30	20	10	0	.667	Lost Semifinal series, 0–2 (Calgary)	
2012–13	Canada West	28	17	7	–	2	2	38	3rd	33	20	11	2	.636	Won Quarterfinal series, 2–0 (Regina); Lost Semifinal series, 1–2 (Saskatchewan)	
2013–14	Canada West	28	12	12	–	3	1	28	4th	34	15	18	1	.456	Won Quarterfinal series, 2–1 (Mount Royal); Lost Semifinal series, 1–2 (Calgary)	
2014–15	Canada West	28	15	13	–	0	0	30	5th	31	16	15	0	.516	Lost Quarterfinal series, 1–2 (British Columbia)	
2015–16	Canada West	28	13	13	–	2	0	28	T–4th	31	14	17	0	.452	Lost Quarterfinal series, 1–2 (Calgary)	
2016–17	Canada West	28	14	12	–	2	0	30	5th	31	15	16	0	.484	Lost Quarterfinal series, 1–2 (Mount Royal)	
2017–18	Canada West	28	16	10	–	2	0	34	3rd	30	16	14	0	.533	Lost Quarterfinal series, 0–2 (Mount Royal)	
2018–19	Canada West	28	6	20	–	2	0	14	7th	28	6	22	0	.214		
2019–20	Canada West	28	9	15	–	2	2	22	6th	30	9	19	2	.333	Lost Quarterfinal series, 0–2 (Calgary)	
2020–21	Season cancelled due to COVID-19 pandemic															
2021–22	Canada West	20	7	12	–	1	0	15	7th	20	7	13	0	.350		
2022–23	Canada West	28	8	19	–	0	1	17	8th	28	8	19	1	.304		
2023–24	Canada West	28	5	22	–	1	0	11	8th	28	5	23	0	.179		
Totals										GP	W	L	T/SOL	%	Championships	
Regular Season										1487	749	653	85	.532	2 WCIAA Championships, 4 GPAC Championships, 1 Canada West Championship, 2 Great Plains Division Titles	
Conference Post-season										125	52	73	0	.416	2 GPAC Championships	
U Sports Postseason										14	5	9	0	.357	7 National tournament appearances	
Regular Season and Postseason Record										1626	806	735	85	.522	1 National Championship	

Totals include games since 1962–63.
Note: Games not counted towards University Cup appearances are not included.

== See also ==
- Manitoba Bisons women's ice hockey
