= Mount Royal Cougars men's ice hockey =

- University: Mount Royal University
- Conference: Canada West
- First season: 1964–65
- Head coach: Bert Gilling; Since 2014–15 season
- Assistant coaches: Drake Brown; Tyler Fiddler; Grant Slessor
- Arena: Flames Community Arena; Calgary, Alberta
- Colors: Blue, Silver, and White

U Sports tournament appearances
- 2025, 2026

Conference tournament champions
- 1973, 1974, 1988, 1993, 1995, 1998, 1999, 2001, 2006, 2011

Conference regular season champions
- 1966, 1969, 1970, 1972, 1973, 1993, 1994, 1995, 1996, 1997, 1998, 2001, 2012

The Mount Royal Cougars men's ice hockey team is an ice hockey team representing the Mount Royal Cougars athletics program of Mount Royal University. The team is a member of the Canada West Universities Athletic Association conference and compete in U Sports. The Cougars play their home games at the Flames Community Arena in Calgary, Alberta.

== History ==
While operating as 'Mount Royal Junior College' in the 1950s, a team from the school competed in the Calgary Junior B Hockey League. Records from this time are spotty at best, however, in 1954 the Cougars won the league championship, eventually losing in the Alberta-British Columbia Junior B Championship to the Trail Smoke Eaters. The team disappears from league records after 1957. It's unclear whether or not the junior team was officially sanctioned by the school or if they were simply allowed to wear school colors.

In 1964, the Western Inter-College Conference (WICC) was formed for small schools in Western Canada who were looking for a way to field ice hockey teams. Mount Royal jumped at the chance, icing a varsity team for the inaugural year. Mount Royal won two league championships in the first five years, however, the school wasn't satisfied with their situation. In 1969, the Cougars left the WICC for the Highwood Hockey League. After winning the league title, they were again on the move and joined the Alberta Junior Hockey League (AJHL) in 1970. After getting knocked out in the semifinals, the Cougars won the regular season championship in 1972 but were ruled ineligible for the postseason as the team possessed overage players who did not qualify for the junior level. Instead, the team participated in the Alberta Colleges Athletic Conference (ACAC) postseason, the successor to the WICC. By winning the championship, the Cougars went on to the inaugural 4-West Championship, a tournament offered for the provincial college champions of Alberta, British Columbia, Manitoba and Saskatchewan. Mount Royal won the first three championships.

Since they were no longer eligible for the AJHL postseason, now Mount Royal College returned to the ACAC in 1972 and won back-to-back league titles. The team then suffered a severe decline and went winless for two seasons at the end of the decade. The terrible results caused the school to suspend the program for two years but the Cougars again failed to win a single game upon their return. By 1983, however, the team was on the road to recovery and Mount Royal rebuilt its program into a champion by the late-80s. Mount Royal won its first intermediate national championship in 1988 and then captured three over the span of four years around the turn of the century. Unfortunately, their final title in 2001 was the last intermediate championship held. Afterwards, the program was only able to win conference titles, which they did in both 2006 and 2011.

In 2012, by then known as 'Mount Royal University', the school transitioned to the senior level of college hockey and joined Canada West. It didn't take long for the team to grow accustomed to the higher level and they posted their first winning season in 2015. The Cougars were also able to advance in the postseason for the first time that year, however, that was where the program plateaued. As of 2024, Mount Royal had reached the conference semifinals seven times but has yet to make a championship round appearance. Additionally, they have finished as high as 3rd in the standing four times but never as one of the top two seeds.

== Season-by-season results ==
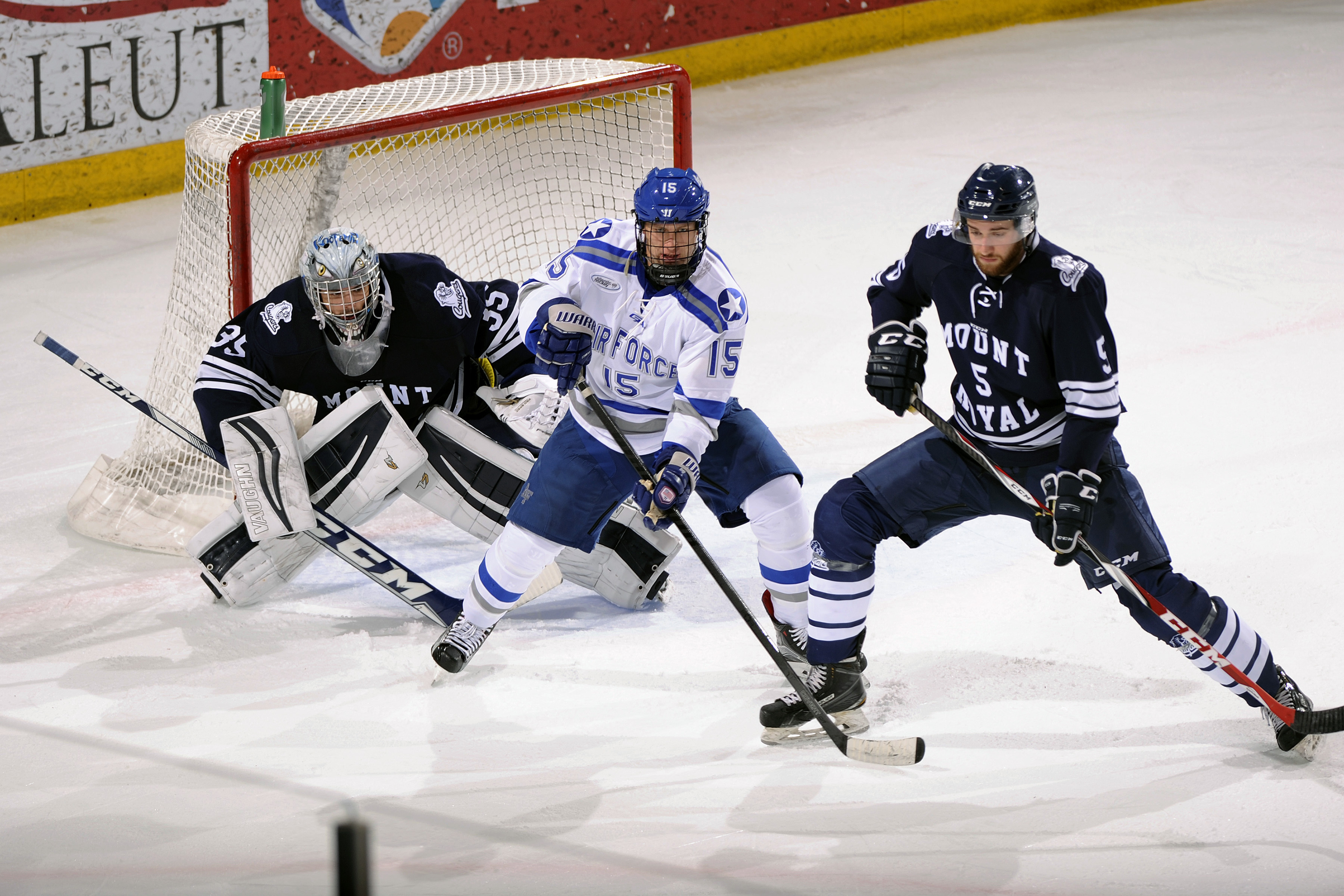
An exhibition game between the Mount Royal and Air Force in 2016

=== Junior and intermediate hockey ===
Note: GP = Games played, W = Wins, L = Losses, T = Ties, OTL = Overtime Losses, SOL = Shootout Losses, Pts = Points

U Sports Champion	U Sports Semifinalist	Conference regular season champions	Conference Division Champions	Conference Playoff Champions

Season	Conference	Regular Season													Conference Tournament Results	National Tournament Results
Season	Conference	Conference								Overall					Conference Tournament Results	National Tournament Results
Season	Conference	GP	W	L	T	OTL	SOL	Pts*	Finish	GP	W	L	T	%	Conference Tournament Results	National Tournament Results
1951–52	?	?	?	?	?	?	?	?	?	?	?	?	?	?		
1952–53	?	?	?	?	?	?	?	?	?	?	?	?	?	?		
1953–54	AJBHL	?	?	?	?	?	?	?	?	?	?	?	?	?	Won Championship series, 3–1 (Drumheller Miners)	Lost Alberta-British Columbia Junior B Championship series, 0–2 (Trail Smoke Eaters)
1954–55	AJBHL	?	?	?	?	?	?	?	?	?	?	?	?	?	Won Championship, 16–0 (Killarney)	
1955–56	?	?	?	?	?	?	?	?	?	?	?	?	?	?		
1956–57	CJBHL	34	16	13	5	–	–	40	4th	?	?	?	?	?	Won Semifinal series, 2–0 (Calgary Tuxedo); Won Championship series, 3–2 (Calgary West Hillhurst)	
Program Suspended
1964–65	WICC	?	?	?	?	?	?	?	?	?	?	?	?	?	Only exhibition games played	
1965–66	WICC	?	?	?	?	?	?	?	1st	?	?	?	?	?		
1966–67	WICC	?	?	?	?	?	?	?	?	?	?	?	?	?		
1967–68	WICC	12	8	4	0	–	–	16	2nd	12	8	4	0	.667		
1968–69	WICC	19	17	2	0	–	–	34	1st	19	17	2	0	.895		
School became 'Mount Royal College'
1969–70	HHL	20	14	5	1	–	–	.725	1st	20	14	5	1	.725		
1970–71	AJHL	50	25	18	7	–	–	57	3rd	55	26	22	7	.536	Lost Semifinal series, 1–4 (Red Deer Rustlers)	
1971–72	AJHL	50	35	13	0	–	–	70	1st	55	26	22	7	.536	Won Alberta Provincial Championship, ? (NAIT)	Won 4-West Semifinal, 12–4 (Cariboo); Won 4-West Championship, 3–2 (Red River)
1972–73	ACAC	24	21	3	0	–	–	42	1st	30	27	3	0	.900	Won Semifinal series, 2–0 (NAIT); Won Championship series, 2–0 (Red Deer)	Won 4-West Semifinal, 4–3 (Kelsey); Won 4-West Championship, 7–5 (Red River)
1973–74	ACAC	24	18	6	0	–	–	36	2nd	30	24	6	0	.800	Won Semifinal series, 2–0 (SAIT); Won Championship series, 2–0 (Red Deer)	Won 4-West Semifinal, 4–2 (Cariboo); Won 4-West Championship, 5–3 (Red River)
1974–75	ACAC	24	19	4	1	–	–	39	3rd	26	19	6	1	.750	Lost Semifinal series, 0–2 (Red Deer)	
1975–76	ACAC	25	16	9	0	–	–	32	3rd	27	16	11	0	.593	Lost Semifinal series, 0–2 (NAIT)	
1976–77	ACAC	24	18	5	1	–	–	37	2nd	29	21	7	1	.741	Won Semifinal series, 2–0 (NAIT); Lost Championship series, 1–2 (Red Deer)	
1977–78	ACAC	24	6	17	1	–	–	13	5th	24	6	17	1	.271		
1978–79	ACAC	24	0	24	0	–	–	0	5th	24	0	24	0	.000		
1979–80	ACAC	24	0	24	0	–	–	0	5th	24	0	24	0	.000		
Program Suspended
1982–83	ACAC	24	0	24	0	–	–	0	5th	24	0	24	0	.000		
1983–84	ACAC	25	12	13	0	–	–	24	4th	27	12	15	0	.444	Lost Semifinal series, 0–2 (NAIT)	
1984–85	ACAC	25	6	19	0	–	–	12	5th	25	6	19	0	.240		
1985–86	ACAC	25	17	8	0	–	–	34	2nd	30	19	11	0	.633	Won Semifinal series, 2–0 (Camrose Lutheran); Lost Championship series, 0–3 (NAIT)	
1986–87	ACAC	25	12	11	2	–	–	26	4th	28	13	13	2	.500	Lost Semifinal series, 1–2 (NAIT)	
1987–88	ACAC	24	14	8	2	–	–	46	2nd	34	23	9	2	.706	Won Semifinal series, 2–0 (Camrose Lutheran); Won Championship series, 3–1 (Red Deer)	Won Pool A Round-robin, 11–4 (Cariboo), 10–9 (Collège Français); Won Semifinal, 5–3 (Humber); Won Championship, 7–6 (2OT) (Collège Français)
1988–89	ACAC	24	10	11	3	–	–	23	3rd	26	10	13	3	.442	Lost Semifinal series, 0–2 (NAIT)	
1989–90	ACAC	24	12	11	1	–	–	25	2nd	26	12	13	1	.481	Lost Semifinal series, 0–2 (Red Deer)	
1990–91	ACAC	25	16	9	0	–	–	32	3rd	27	16	11	0	.593	Lost Semifinal series, 0–2 (NAIT)	
1991–92	ACAC	25	13	11	1	–	–	27	4th	28	13	14	1	.482	Lost Semifinal series, 0–3 (NAIT)	
1992–93	ACAC	24	18	5	1	–	–	37	1st	30	24	5	1	.817	Won Semifinal series, 3–0 (Augustana); Won Championship series, 3–0 (Red Deer)	
1993–94	ACAC	22	17	5	0	–	–	34	1st	30	22	8	0	.733	Won Semifinal series, 3–0 (Augustana); Lost Championship series, 2–3 (Red Deer)	
1994–95	ACAC	25	17	6	2	–	–	36	1st	30	21	7	2	.733	Won Semifinal series, 2–0 (Red Deer); Won Championship series, 2–1 (NAIT)	
1995–96	ACAC	22	17	5	0	–	–	34	1st	32	22	10	0	.688	Won Semifinal series, 3–2 (Red Deer); Lost Championship series, 2–3 (NAIT)	
1996–97	ACAC	22	16	6	0	–	–	32	1st	26	17	9	0	.654	Lost Semifinal series, 1–3 (NAIT)	
1997–98	ACAC	24	19	3	2	–	–	40	1st	32	26	4	2	.844	Won Semifinal series, 2–1 (Red Deer); Won Championship series, 2–0 (SAIT)	Won Round-robin, 9–1 (Cambrian), 9–3 (Seneca); Won Championship, 4–3 (Cambrian)
1998–99	ACAC	28	18	10	0	–	–	36	3rd	41	28	13	0	.683	Won Quarterfinal series, 2–1 (Augustana); Won Semifinal series, 2–0 (SAIT); Won Championship series, 3–2 (Red Deer)	Won Round-robin, 12–4 (Cambrian), 6–2 (Conestoga); Won Championship, 6–0 (Conestoga)
1999–00	ACAC	28	20	7	1	–	–	41	2nd	30	20	9	1	.683	Lost Semifinal series, 0–2 (NAIT)	
2000–01	ACAC	28	22	5	1	–	–	45	1st	36	30	5	1	.847	Won Semifinal series, 2–0 (Red Deer); Won Championship series, 3–0 (NAIT)	Won Round-robin, 12–1 (Sault), 14–1 (Conestoga); Won Championship, 16–1 (Conestoga)
2001–02	ACAC	28	14	8	4	2	–	34	4th	31	15	12	4	.548	Lost Quarterfinal series, 1–2 (Augustana)	
2002–03	ACAC	28	14	9	1	4	–	33	5th	30	14	15	1	.483	Lost Quarterfinal series, 0–2 (Concordia)	
2003–04	ACAC	28	10	14	2	2	–	24	6th	31	10	19	2	.355	Lost Quarterfinal series, 0–3 (MacEwan)	
2004–05	ACAC	24	14	8	0	2	–	30	4th	32	18	14	0	.563	Won Quarterfinal series, 2–1 (Alberta Augustana); Lost Semifinal series, 2–3 (SAIT)	
2005–06	ACAC	24	13	9	0	2	–	28	2nd	34	19	15	0	.559	Won Semifinal series, 3–2 (Alberta Augustana); Won Championship series, 3–2 (SAIT)	
2006–07	ACAC	24	17	6	1	0	–	35	2nd	28	18	9	1	.661	Lost Semifinal series, 1–3 (NAIT)	
2007–08	ACAC	24	13	8	0	3	–	29	4th	29	15	14	0	.517	Won Quarterfinal series, 2–0 (NAIT); Lost Semifinal series, 0–3 (SAIT)	
2008–09	ACAC	28	20	8	0	0	–	40	3rd	40	27	13	0	.675	Won Quarterfinal series, 2–1 (Briercrest); Won Semifinal series, 3–1 (NAIT); Lost Championship series, 2–3 (SAIT)	
School became 'Mount Royal University'
2009–10	ACAC	28	21	5	2	0	–	32	2nd	31	21	8	2	.710	Lost Semifinal series, 0–3 (Concordia)	
2010–11	ACAC	28	20	8	0	0	–	40	3rd	40	28	12	0	.700	Won Quarterfinal series, 2–1 (Briercrest); Won Semifinal series, 3–1 (NAIT); Won Championship series, 3–2 (SAIT)	
2011–12	ACAC	28	22	2	3	1	–	48	1st	33	24	6	3	.773	Lost Semifinal series, 2–3 (NAIT)	
Totals										GP	W	L	T/SOL	%	Championships	
Regular Season										?	?	?	?	?	2 WICC Championships, 1 HHL Championship, 1 AJHL Championship, 9 ACAC Championships	
Conference Post-season										?	?	?	?	?	2 AJBHL Championships, 1 CJBHL Championship, 10 ACAC Championships	
Regular Season and Postseason Record										?	?	?	?	?	3 4-West Championships, 4 CCAA Championships	

=== Senior hockey ===
Note: GP = Games played, W = Wins, L = Losses, T = Ties, OTL = Overtime Losses, SOL = Shootout Losses, Pts = Points

U Sports Champion	U Sports Semifinalist	Conference regular season champions	Conference Division Champions	Conference Playoff Champions

Season	Conference	Regular Season													Conference Tournament Results	National Tournament Results
Season	Conference	Conference								Overall					Conference Tournament Results	National Tournament Results
Season	Conference	GP	W	L	T	OTL	SOL	Pts*	Finish	GP	W	L	T	%	Conference Tournament Results	National Tournament Results
2012–13	Canada West	28	7	19	–	2	0	16	7th	28	7	21	0	.250		
2013–14	Canada West	28	11	14	–	3	0	25	5th	31	12	19	0	.387	Lost Quarterfinal series, 1–2 (Manitoba)	
2014–15	Canada West	28	17	10	–	0	1	35	3rd	34	20	13	1	.603	Won Quarterfinal series, 2–1 (Saskatchewan); Lost Semifinal series, 1–2 (Calgary)	
2015–16	Canada West	28	17	8	–	3	0	37	3rd	32	19	13	0	.594	Won Quarterfinal series, 2–0 (British Columbia); Lost Semifinal series, 0–2 (Alberta)	
2016–17	Canada West	28	15	11	–	2	0	32	4th	32	17	15	0	.531	Won Quarterfinal series, 2–0 (Manitoba); Lost Semifinal series, 0–2 (Saskatchewan)	
2017–18	Canada West	28	12	14	–	1	1	26	6th	32	14	17	1	.453	Won Quarterfinal series, 2–0 (Manitoba); Lost Semifinal series, 0–2 (Alberta)	
2018–19	Canada West	28	12	11	–	5	0	29	5th	32	14	18	0	.438	Won Quarterfinal series, 2–0 (British Columbia); Lost Semifinal series, 0–2 (Alberta)	
2019–20	Canada West	28	18	8	–	0	2	38	4th	31	19	10	2	.645	Lost Quarterfinal series, 1–2 (British Columbia)	
2020–21	Season cancelled due to COVID-19 pandemic															
2021–22	Canada West	20	13	6	–	1	0	27	3rd	25	16	9	0	.640	Won Quarterfinal series, 2–0 (Regina); Lost Semifinal series, 1–2 (British Columbia)	
2022–23	Canada West	28	19	5	–	4	0	42	4th	31	20	11	0	.645	Lost Quarterfinal series, 1–2 (Saskatchewan)	
2023–24	Canada West	28	21	6	–	0	1	43	3rd	32	23	8	1	.734	Won Quarterfinal series, 2–0 (MacEwan); Lost Semifinal series, 0–2 (Calgary)	
Totals										GP	W	L	T/SOL	%	Championships	
Regular Season										300	162	133	5	.548		
Conference Post-season										40	19	21	0	.475		
U Sports Postseason										0	0	0	0	–		
Regular Season and Postseason Record										340	181	154	5	.540		

Note: Games not counted towards University Cup appearances are not included.

== See also ==
Mount Royal Cougars women's ice hockey
