= MacEwan Griffins men's ice hockey =

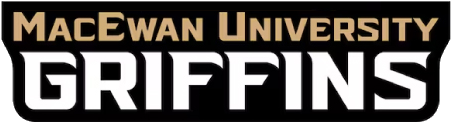
- University: MacEwan University
- Conference: Canada West
- First season: 1998–99
- Head coach: Zack Dailey; Since 2022–23 season
- Assistant coaches: Sean Ringrose; Ryan Benn; Nolan Yaremchuk; Cam Reagan
- Arena: Downtown Community Arena; Edmonton, Alberta
- Colors: Maroon and White

The MacEwan Griffins men's ice hockey team is an ice hockey team representing the MacEwan Griffins athletics program of MacEwan University. The team is a member of the Canada West Universities Athletic Association conference and compete in U Sports. The Griffins play their home games at the Downtown Community Arena in Edmonton, Alberta.

== History ==
Relative to other Canadian universities, MacEwan is a rather recent addition to ice hockey circles. The Griffins hit the ice for the first time in 1998 as members of the Alberta Colleges Athletics Conference, a second-tier league outside U Sports. Rob Davis helmed the team for the first three seasons but saw little success. Immediately after Terry Ewasiuk took over, the team posted its first winning season and finished as league runners-up. After another second-place result, MacEwan won its first conference title in 2004, however, since the national CCAA championship had been discontinued by that point, the program had to settle for being the best team in their conference. Ewasiuk remained with the club until 2007, never having a losing season.

After having professor Bryan Keller helm the team for a year, Jamie Langley was brought in as the fourth head coach. Langley's 4-year tenure saw the team finish at least 10 games below-.500 in each season. The club missed the postseason three years running, making the only time the Griffins had not played a playoff game outside of its time under Davis. Bram Stephen was hired in 2012 to rebuild the program and, after a slow start, he succeeded. MacEwan steadily climbed back to the top of the ACAC and, by 2017, the Griffins were able to win their second league title.

Michael Ringrose assumed the reins in 2017 and kept the good times rolling. MacEwan won the league championship in each of his first two seasons and the dominance of the program helped to convince Canada West to accept both the men's and women's ice hockey teams as members beginning in 2020. In their final season with the ACAC, MacEwan was in contention for a fourth consecutive championship when the conference tournament was cancelled due to the COVID-19 pandemic. The outbreak also caused the cancellation of the entire Canadian college season in 2020–21, delaying MacEwan's entry into senior hockey by a year.

MacEwan made its Canada West debut in the fall of 2021. Perhaps unsurprisingly, the team had trouble winning in its first campaign as it got up to speed with the higher level of hockey. Zack Dailey took over as coach in 2022, eventually leading the Griffins to their first postseason appearance in his second season.

=== Nakehko Lamothe ===
After a game against SAIT on January 25, 2019, 23-year-old Nakehko Lamothe went into cardiac arrest and collapsed in the visiting dressing room. The third-year player was rushed to hospital but was pronounced dead just before midnight. Both his team and family were shocked, having no knowledge of any medical issues prior to Nakehko's death. After the Griffins won the league title two months later, team captain Cam Gotaas presented the championship trophy to Lamothe's family.

== Season-by-season results ==
=== Intermediate hockey ===
Note: GP = Games played, W = Wins, L = Losses, T = Ties, OTL = Overtime Losses, SOL = Shootout Losses, Pts = Points

U Sports Champion	U Sports Semifinalist	Conference regular season champions	Conference Division Champions	Conference Playoff Champions

Season	Conference	Regular Season														Conference Tournament Results	National Tournament Results
Season	Conference	Conference									Overall					Conference Tournament Results	National Tournament Results
Season	Conference	GP	W	L	T	OTL	SOW	SOL	Pts*	Finish	GP	W	L	T	%	Conference Tournament Results	National Tournament Results
Rob Davis (1998–2001)
1998–99	ACAC	28	3	24	1	–	–	–	7	8th	28	3	24	1	.125		
1999–00	ACAC	28	10	13	–	–	2	3	27	5th	30	10	15	5	.417	Lost Quarterfinal series, 0–2 (Red Deer)	
2000–01	ACAC	28	7	17	3	1	–	–	18	7th	28	7	18	3	.304		
Terry Ewasiuk (2001–2007)
2001–02	ACAC	28	19	6	2	1	–	–	41	2nd	34	21	11	2	.647	Won Semifinal series, 2–1 (NAIT); Lost Championship series, 0–3 (SAIT)	
2002–03	ACAC	28	14	8	4	2	–	–	34	T–3rd	40	21	15	4	.575	Won Quarterfinal series, 2–1 (Augustana); Won Semifinal series, 3–1 (NAIT); Lost Championship series, 2–3 (Concordia)	
2003–04	ACAC	28	20	4	2	2	–	–	44	1st	34	26	6	2	.794	Won Semifinal series, 3–0 (Mount Royal); Won Championship series, 3–0 (NAIT)	
2004–05	ACAC	24	16	6	2	0	–	–	34	T–2nd	36	23	11	2	.667	Won Quarterfinal series, 2–0 (Concordia); Won Semifinal series, 3–2 (NAIT); Lost Championship series, 2–3 (SAIT)	
2005–06	ACAC	24	11	8	4	1	–	–	27	T–3rd	26	11	11	4	.500	Lost Quarterfinal series, 0–2 (Concordia)	
2006–07	ACAC	24	14	9	1	0	–	–	29	4th	27	15	11	1	.574	Lost Quarterfinal series, 1–2 (Concordia)	
Bryan Keller (2007–2008)
2007–08	ACAC	24	14	8	2	0	–	–	30	T–2nd	34	19	13	2	.588	Won Quarterfinal series, 2–1 (Briercrest); Won Semifinal series, 3–1 (Concordia); Lost Championship series, 0–3 (SAIT)	
Jamie Langley (2008–2012)
2008–09	ACAC	28	8	19	–	1	–	–	17	8th	28	8	20	0	.286		
2009–10	ACAC	28	4	23	0	1	–	–	9	8th	28	4	24	0	.143		
2010–11	ACAC	28	3	23	2	0	–	–	8	8th	28	3	23	2	.143		
2011–12	ACAC	28	8	18	1	1	–	–	18	6th	30	8	21	1	.283	Lost Quarterfinal series, 0–3 (SAIT)	
Bram Stephen (2012–2017)
2012–13	ACAC	28	9	19	0	0	–	–	18	T–6th	30	9	21	0	.300	Lost Quarterfinal series, 0–2 (Alberta Augustana)	
2013–14	ACAC	32	15	14	3	0	–	–	33	5th	35	16	16	3	.500	Lost Quarterfinal series, 1–2 (Red Deer)	
2014–15	ACAC	32	21	7	3	1	–	–	46	3rd	35	22	10	3	.671	Lost Quarterfinal series, 1–2 (Keyano)	
2015–16	ACAC	32	14	14	1	3	–	–	32	6th	35	15	19	1	.443	Lost Quarterfinal series, 1–2 (Keyano)	
2016–17	ACAC	28	21	6	0	1	–	–	43	2nd	33	25	8	0	.758	Won Semifinal series, 2–0 (SAIT); Won Championship series, 2–1 (NAIT)	
Michael Ringrose (2017–2022)
2017–18	ACAC	28	20	7	0	1	–	–	43	2nd	33	24	9	0	.727	Won Semifinal series, 2–0 (Red Deer); Won Championship series, 2–1 (NAIT)	
2018–19	ACAC	28	19	7	1	1	–	–	40	T–2nd	33	23	9	1	.712	Won Semifinal series, 2–1 (Red Deer); Won Championship series, 2–0 (NAIT)	
2019–20	ACAC	28	20	7	0	1	–	–	41	3rd	31 ^{†}	22 ^{†}	9 ^{†}	0 ^{†}	.710	Won Quarterfinal series, 2–1 (Concordia); Remainder of postseason cancelled	
Totals											GP	W	L	T/SOL	%	Championships	
Regular Season											612	310	285	37	.520	1 ACAC Championship	
Conference Post-season											84	45	39	0	.536	4 ACAC Championships	
Regular Season and Postseason Record											696	355	324	37	.522		

† Sean Ringrose served as interim head coach for 22 games while Michael Ringrose was on paternity leave.

=== Senior hockey ===
Note: GP = Games played, W = Wins, L = Losses, T = Ties, OTL = Overtime Losses, SOL = Shootout Losses, Pts = Points

U Sports Champion	U Sports Semifinalist	Conference regular season champions	Conference Division Champions	Conference Playoff Champions

Season	Conference	Regular Season													Conference Tournament Results	National Tournament Results
Season	Conference	Conference								Overall					Conference Tournament Results	National Tournament Results
Season	Conference	GP	W	L	T	OTL	SOL	Pts*	Finish	GP	W	L	T	%	Conference Tournament Results	National Tournament Results
2020–21	Season cancelled due to COVID-19 pandemic															
2021–22	Canada West	20	3	17	–	0	0	6	8th	20	3	17	0	.150		
Zack Dailey (2022–Present)
2022–23	Canada West	28	9	18	–	1	0	19	7th	28	9	19	0	.321		
2023–24	Canada West	28	9	17	–	0	2	20	6th	30	9	19	2	.333	Lost Quarterfinal series, 0–2 (Mount Royal)	
Totals										GP	W	L	T/SOL	%	Championships	
Regular Season										76	21	53	2	.289		
Conference Post-season										2	0	2	0	.000		
U Sports Postseason										0	0	0	0	–		
Regular Season and Postseason Record										78	21	55	2	.282		

Note: Games not counted towards University Cup appearances are not included.
