= Regina Cougars men's ice hockey =

- University: University of Regina
- Conference: Canada West
- Head coach: Trevor Keeper; Since 2025–26 season
- Assistant coaches: Jeff Lawson Chris Robertson Rod Houk
- Arena: The Co-operators Centre; Regina, Saskatchewan
- Colors: Green and Gold

U Sports tournament appearances
- 1978, 1979, 1980, 1982

Conference tournament champions
- 1978, 1979, 1980, 1982

Conference regular season champions
- 1978, 1979, 1982, 1992

The Regina Cougars men's ice hockey team is an ice hockey team representing the Regina Cougars athletics program of University of Regina. The team is a member of the Canada West Universities Athletic Association conference and compete in U Sports. The Cougars play their home games at The Co-operators Centre in Regina, Saskatchewan.

== History ==
Shortly after the school split from its parent university, the University of Saskatchewan, Regina began sponsoring varsity ice hockey. Instead of joining with the Huskies in Canada West, the Cougars became members of the more geographically-appropriate Great Plains Athletic Conference (GPAC). Regina hit the ground running, finishing as runners-up in their first season and then winning the league title in only their second season. In the team's first six seasons, they won four GPAC championships, however, it took the team a little longer to find success in the University Cup. The Cougars lost their first four tournament games, however, they swept through pool play in 1980 to reach their first championship match. Though they fell to perennial powerhouse Alberta, they were the only team from the GPAC to ever reach the final game.

Regina declined as the 80s wore on but still remained one of the better teams in the conference. However, in 1985, the GPAC collapsed when it became reduced to just three members. The remaining schools, Regina, Brandon and Manitoba, all joined Canada West Universities Athletic Association. While it was the only move Regina could make and still have a pathway to the national tournament, the team's record suffered mightily in its new conference. The Cougars bottomed-out in 1988 but recovered by the early-90s with a few decent performances. Regina captured a regular season title in 1992 but were upset in the final round and prevented from returning to the University Cup two more finals appearances in the 90s followed but both ended with the same result.

By the beginning of the 21st century, the glory days of the program were becoming a distant memory as Regina sank towards the bottom of the standings. Over a 24-year span, the Cougars produced only two (barely) winning records in the regular season while finishing dead-last on nine occasions. The Cougars returned from the COVID-imposed break with a decent performance in 2022, however, by the next season they were back at the bottom of the standings.

== Season-by-season results ==
Note: GP = Games played, W = Wins, L = Losses, T = Ties, OTL = Overtime Losses, SOL = Shootout Losses, Pts = Points

U Sports Champion	U Sports Semi-finalist	Conference regular season champions	Conference Division Champions	Conference Playoff Champions

Season	Conference	Regular Season													Conference Tournament Results	National Tournament Results
Season	Conference	Conference								Overall					Conference Tournament Results	National Tournament Results
Season	Conference	GP	W	L	T	OTL	SOL	Pts*	Finish	GP	W	L	T	%	Conference Tournament Results	National Tournament Results
1976–77	GPAC	22	13	9	0	–	–	26	2nd	22	13	9	0	.591		
1977–78	GPAC	22	18	4	0	–	–	36	1st	27	20	7	0	.741	Won Championship series, 2–1 (Lakehead)	Lost Group 1 Round-robin, 3–7 (Alberta), 0–5 (St. Francis Xavier)
1978–79	GPAC	22	18	4	0	–	–	36	1st	26	20	6	0	.769	Won Championship series, 2–0 (Manitoba)	Lost Group 1 Round-robin, 1–3 (Alberta), 3–8 (Concordia)
1979–80	GPAC	20	12	8	0	–	–	24	3rd	27	17	10	0	.630	Won Semi-final, 4–2 (Manitoba); Won Championship series, 2–1 (Brandon)	Won Group 2 Round-robin, 5–2 (Guelph), 7–4 (Moncton); Lost Championship, 3–7 (Alberta)
1980–81	GPAC	24	13	11	0	–	–	26	3rd	25	13	12	0	.520	Lost Semi-final, 3–5 (Manitoba)	
1981–82	GPAC	24	21	3	0	–	–	42	1st	29	23	6	0	.793	Won Championship series, 2–1 (Brandon)	Lost Group 1 Round-robin, 5–6 (Concordia), 2–8 (Saskatchewan)
1982–83	GPAC	24	13	11	0	–	–	26	3rd	25	13	12	0	.520	Lost Semi-final, 2–4 (Manitoba)	
1983–84	GPAC	24	10	14	0	–	–	20	3rd	24	10	14	0	.417	Lost Semi-final, 4–5 (Brandon)	
1984–85	GPAC	24	15	8	1	–	–	31	2nd	28	17	10	1	.625	Won Semi-final series, 2–0 (Lakehead); Lost Championship series, 0–2 (Manitoba)	
1985–86	Canada West	28	8	20	0	–	–	16	7th	28	8	20	0	.286		
1986–87	Canada West	28	9	18	1	–	–	19	7th	28	9	18	1	.339		
1987–88	Canada West	28	3	24	1	–	–	7	8th	28	3	24	1	.125		
1988–89	Canada West	28	9	16	3	–	–	21	6th	28	9	16	3	.375		
1989–90	Canada West	28	13	13	2	–	–	28	T–4th	30	13	15	2	.467	Lost Semi-final series, 0–2 (Calgary)	
1990–91	Canada West	28	13	14	1	–	–	27	4th	31	14	16	1	.468	Lost Semi-final series, 1–2 (Calgary)	
1991–92	Canada West	28	19	6	3	–	–	41	1st	32	21	8	3	.703	Won Semi-final series, 2–0 (Manitoba); Lost Championship series, 0–2 (Alberta)	
1992–93	Canada West	28	16	7	5	–	–	37	2nd	33	18	10	5	.621	Won Semi-final series, 2–1 (Calgary); Lost Championship series, 0–2 (Alberta)	
1993–94	Canada West	28	16	11	1	–	–	33	4th	31	17	13	1	.565	Lost Semi-final series, 1–2 (Lethbridge)	
1994–95	Canada West	28	17	9	2	–	–	36	2nd	30	17	11	2	.600	Lost Semi-final series, 0–2 (Manitoba)	
1995–96	Canada West	28	12	11	5	–	–	29	5th	36	16	15	5	.514	Won Division Semi-final series, 2–1 (Saskatchewan); Won Division Final series, 2–1 (Manitoba); Lost Championship series, 0–2 (Calgary)	
1996–97	Canada West	26	7	17	2	–	–	16	7th	28	7	19	2	.286	Lost Division Semi-final series, 0–2 (Manitoba)	
1997–98	Canada West	28	4	22	2	–	–	10	8th	28	4	22	2	.179		
1998–99	Canada West	28	4	20	4	–	–	12	8th	28	4	20	4	.214		
1999–00	Canada West	28	4	21	3	–	–	11	8th	28	4	21	3	.196		
2000–01	Canada West	28	9	14	5	–	–	23	6th	30	9	16	5	.383	Lost Division Semi-final series, 0–2 (Saskatchewan)	
2001–02	Canada West	28	12	12	4	–	–	28	5th	30	12	14	4	.467	Lost Quarter-final series, 0–2 (Manitoba)	
2002–03	Canada West	28	11	16	1	–	–	23	5th	30	11	18	1	.383	Lost Quarter-final series, 0–2 (Manitoba)	
2003–04	Canada West	28	10	14	4	–	–	24	4th	32	12	16	4	.438	Won Division Semi-final series, 2–0 (Manitoba); Lost Semi-final series, 0–2 (Saskatchewan)	
2004–05	Canada West	28	6	17	5	–	–	17	5th	30	6	19	5	.283	Lost Division Semi-final series, 0–2 (Manitoba)	
2005–06	Canada West	28	10	16	2	–	–	22	6th	31	11	18	2	.387	Lost Division Semi-final series, 1–2 (Manitoba)	
2006–07	Canada West	28	13	12	–	3	–	29	T–5th	31	14	17	0	.452	Lost Division Semi-final series, 1–2 (Calgary)	
2007–08	Canada West	28	10	15	–	3	–	23	6th	30	10	20	0	.333	Lost Quarter-final series, 0–2 (Calgary)	
2008–09	Canada West	28	11	15	–	0	2	24	6th	33	14	17	2	.455	Won Division Semi-final series, 2–0 (Manitoba); Lost Semi-final series, 1–2 (Alberta)	
2009–10	Canada West	28	9	17	–	2	0	20	6th	28	9	19	0	.321		
2010–11	Canada West	28	8	18	–	0	2	18	7th	28	8	18	2	.321		
2011–12	Canada West	28	5	20	–	2	1	13	7th	28	5	22	1	.196		
2012–13	Canada West	28	13	12	–	3	0	29	6th	30	13	17	0	.433	Lost Quarter-final series, 0–2 (Manitoba)	
2013–14	Canada West	28	11	15	–	1	1	24	T–6th	28	11	16	1	.411		
2014–15	Canada West	28	8	17	–	2	1	19	7th	28	8	19	1	.304		
2015–16	Canada West	28	7	21	–	0	0	14	8th	28	7	21	0	.250		
2016–17	Canada West	28	3	22	–	3	0	9	8th	28	3	25	0	.107		
2017–18	Canada West	28	4	22	–	1	1	10	8th	28	4	23	1	.161		
2018–19	Canada West	28	4	23	–	1	0	9	8th	28	4	24	0	.143		
2019–20	Canada West	28	8	17	–	2	1	19	7th	28	8	19	1	.304		
2020–21	Season cancelled due to COVID-19 pandemic															
2021–22	Canada West	20	10	9	–	1	0	21	6th	22	10	12	0	.455	Lost Quarter-final series, 0–2 (Mount Royal)	
2022–23	Canada West	28	8	17	–	2	1	17	6th	30	8	21	1	.283	Lost Quarter-final series, 0–2 (British Columbia)	
2023–24	Canada West	28	6	20	–	1	1	14	7th	28	6	21	1	.232		
Totals										GP	W	L	T/SOL	%	Championships	
Regular Season										1260	483	709	68	.410	3 GPAC Championships, 1 Canada West Championship	
Conference Post-season										78	28	50	0	.359	4 GPAC Championships	
U Sports Postseason										9	2	7	0	.222	4 National tournament appearances	
Regular Season and Postseason Record										1347	513	766	68	.406		

Note: Games not counted towards University Cup appearances are not included.

== See also ==
- Regina Cougars women's ice hockey
