= Trinity Western Spartans men's ice hockey =

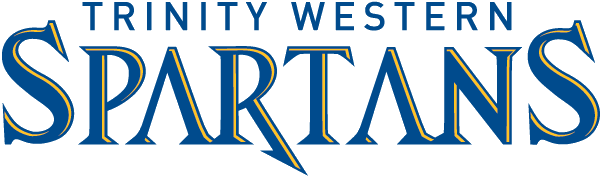
- University: Trinity Western University
- Conference: Canada West
- First season: 2010–11
- Head coach: Ben Walter; Since 2022–23 season
- Assistant coaches: Kyle Beach; Ken McPhalen
- Arena: Langley Events Centre; Langley, British Columbia
- Colors: Blue and Gold

The Trinity Western Spartans men's ice hockey team is an ice hockey team representing the Trinity Western Spartans athletics program of Trinity Western University. The team is a member of the Canada West Universities Athletic Association conference and compete in U Sports. The Spartans play their home games at the Langley Events Centre in Langley, British Columbia.

== History ==
When the British Columbia Intercollegiate Hockey League (BCIHL) was formed in 2006, one of the founding members was a club team from Trinity Western University, playing under the banner of 'Trinity Western Titans'. The team was rather poor during this time, however, that did not dissuade the university from promoting the program to varsity status in 2010. However, even with the athletic department behind the program, the Spartans had trouble finding their game. The team posted losing seasons every year until finally settling in during 2015. Three years later, the club won its first league championship, which was followed by a second in 2019. After their second consecutive title, Canada West announced that Trinity Western's men's and women's ice hockey programs would join the conference in 2020.

In their final season in the BCIHL, Trinity Western was set up for their third title, however, the entire postseason was cancelled due to the COVID-19 pandemic. The outbreak also caused the cancellation of the entire Canadian college season in 2020–21, delaying TWU's entry into senior hockey by a year.

Once the Spartans made their Canada West debut, the team could hardly have performed worse. The team finished dead-last in the standings while allowed more than five and half goals per game. Barret Kropf, who had led the team since 2013, was replaced by former NHLer Ben Walter. The next two seasons weren't much better for Trinity Western as they continued to wallow at the bottom of the conference with only slight improvements in win totals.

== Season-by-season results ==
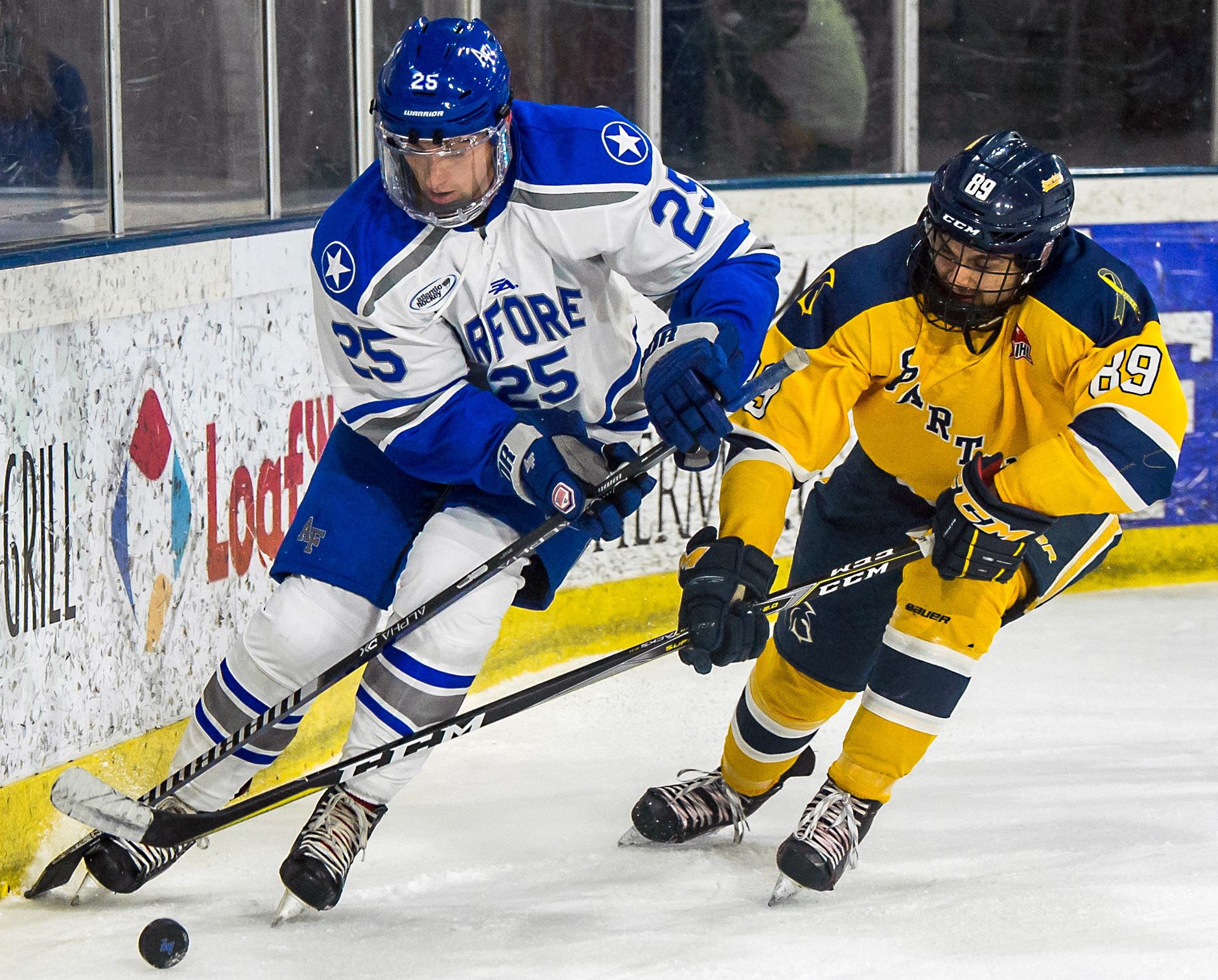
An exhibition game between Trinity Western and Air Force in 2019

=== Intermediate hockey ===
Note: GP = Games played, W = Wins, L = Losses, T = Ties, OTL = Overtime Losses, SOL = Shootout Losses, Pts = Points

U Sports Champion	U Sports Semifinalist	Conference regular season champions	Conference Division Champions	Conference Playoff Champions

Season	Conference	Regular Season													Conference Tournament Results	National Tournament Results
Season	Conference	Conference								Overall					Conference Tournament Results	National Tournament Results
Season	Conference	GP	W	L	T	OTL	SOL	Pts*	Finish	GP	W	L	T	%	Conference Tournament Results	National Tournament Results
2010–11	BCIHL	24	10	12	2	–	–	22	5th	26	10	14	2	.423	Lost Preliminary series, 0–2 (Victoria)	
2011–12	BCIHL	24	4	15	5	–	–	13	6th	24	4	15	5	.271		
2012–13	BCIHL	24	6	16	–	2	–	14	6th	24	6	18	0	.250		
2013–14	BCIHL	24	10	13	–	1	–	21	3rd	29	12	17	0	.414	Won Semifinal series, 2–1 (Simon Fraser); Lost Championship series, 0–2 (Selkirk)	
2014–15	BCIHL	24	17	5	–	2	–	36	1st	28	19	9	0	.679	Won Semifinal series, 2–0 (Simon Fraser); Lost Championship series, 0–2 (Selkirk)	
2015–16	BCIHL	24	13	9	–	2	–	28	3rd	28	15	13	0	.536	Won Semifinal series, 2–0 (Simon Fraser); Lost Championship series, 0–2 (Selkirk)	
2016–17	BCIHL	24	16	6	–	2	–	34	2nd	29	19	10	0	.655	Won Semifinal series, 2–0 (Selkirk); Lost Championship series, 1–2 (Victoria)	
2017–18	BCIHL	25	21	3	–	1	–	43	1st	29	25	4	0	.862	Won Semifinal series, 2–0 (Victoria); Won Championship series, 2–0 (Selkirk)	
2018–19	BCIHL	24	18	5	–	1	–	37	1st	28	22	6	0	.786	Won Semifinal series, 2–1 (Simon Fraser); Won Championship series, 2–0 (Vancouver Island)	
2019–20	BCIHL	24	19	4	–	1	–	39	1st	24	19	5	0	.792	Tournament cancelled	
Totals										GP	W	L	T/SOL	%	Championships	
Regular Season										240	134	99	7	.573	4 BCIHL Championships	
Conference Post-season										29	17	12	0	.586	2 BCIHL Championships	
Regular Season and Postseason Record										269	151	111	7	.574		

=== Senior hockey ===
Note: GP = Games played, W = Wins, L = Losses, T = Ties, OTL = Overtime Losses, SOL = Shootout Losses, Pts = Points

U Sports Champion	U Sports Semifinalist	Conference regular season champions	Conference Division Champions	Conference Playoff Champions

Season	Conference	Regular Season													Conference Tournament Results	National Tournament Results
Season	Conference	Conference								Overall					Conference Tournament Results	National Tournament Results
Season	Conference	GP	W	L	T	OTL	SOL	Pts*	Finish	GP	W	L	T	%	Conference Tournament Results	National Tournament Results
Barret Kropf (2013–2022)
2020–21	Season cancelled due to COVID-19 pandemic															
2021–22	Canada West	20	2	17	–	1	0	5	9th	20	2	18	0	.100		
Ben Walter (2022–Present)
2022–23	Canada West	28	3	24	–	1	0	7	9th	28	3	25	0	.107		
2023–24	Canada West	28	4	23	–	0	1	9	9th	28	4	23	1	.161		
Totals										GP	W	L	T/SOL	%	Championships	
Regular Season										76	9	66	1	.125		
Conference Post-season										0	0	0	0	–		
U Sports Postseason										0	0	0	0	–		
Regular Season and Postseason Record										76	9	66	1	.125		

Note: Games not counted towards University Cup appearances are not included.
