= OUA men's ice hockey tournament =

Ontario University Athletics men's ice hockey tournament
- Conference hockey championship
- Sport: Ice hockey
- Conference: Ontario University Athletics
- Format: Single-elimination
- Played: 1998–present
- Winner trophy: Queen's Cup

The Ontario University Athletics ice hockey tournament is an annual conference championship held between member teams. The winner receives an automatic bid to the U Sports men's ice hockey championship.

== History ==
=== Four division league ===
In 1997, the OUAA changes its name to Ontario University Athletics (OUA). Coinciding with the rebranding was a change to the playoff format. The OUA used the same qualifications as the OUAA had; the four division winners received byes into the quarterfinal round while the second- and third-place teams met in the first round. The first round was changed to a two-game series where if the teams remained tied after the two matches than a 20-minute mini-game was used as a tiebreaker (mini-games are unofficial matches that are not counted for any statistical category). The Divisional Finals were also altered, becoming a best-of-five series. This format lasted for only one year and the following season the mini-game was replaced by a regular best-of-three series while the second round went from best-of-five to best-of-three.

The playoff format remained constant for several years but saw a small change in 2005. The OUA paired the eastern and western divisions for the postseason. The four division champions were still given byes into the second round, however, the remaining four teams for each bracket were selected based upon their regular season record and seeded accordingly. Additionally, the division final round was now also changed to a best-of-three series.

=== Two division league ===
In the later half of the 00s, OUA added three more schools to the lineup. After the arrival of Nipissing, the league abandoned the cumbersome four division format and switched to eastern and western halves. Additionally, the tournament was expanded to 16 teams with all beginning play in the division quarterfinal round. The league also would hold a third place game in alternating years starting with 2012. When the national tournament expanded to 8 teams in 2015, it began offering three automatic bids to the OUA, causing the conference to make the third place game a permanent fixture.

As a result of the restrictions during the 2021–22 season due to the COVID-19 pandemic, the league was temporarily rearranged into four division. Additionally, all rounds were switched to single-elimination for this season. Furthermore, the teams were not reseeded after the first round due to the short time between matches. After the COVID restrictions ended, the league contracted its tournament, limiting entry to 12 teams and giving byes to the top two teams from each division.

== 1998 ==
| Far East | | | Mid East | | | Mid West | | | Far West | | |
| Seed | School | Standings | Seed | School | Standings | Seed | School | Standings | Seed | School | Standings |
|---|---|---|---|---|---|---|---|---|---|---|---|
| 1 | Quebec–Trois-Rivières | 20–4–2 | 1 | Guelph | 17–5–4 | 1 | York | 13–11–2 | 1 | Windsor | 22–3–1 |
| T–2 | Concordia | 13–11–2 | 2 | Toronto | 10–13–3 | 2 | Brock | 10–15–1 | 2 | Waterloo | 15–7–4 |
| T–2 | McGill | 12–10–4 | 3 | Queen's | 8–16–2 | 3 | Laurentian | 9–16–1 | 3 | Western Ontario | 15–8–3 |
| 4 | Ottawa | 13–12–1 | 4 | Royal Military College | 2–20–4 | 4 | Ryerson | 3–19–4 | 4 | Wilfrid Laurier | 6–18–2 |

Division Semifinals
FE2 | Concordia | 3* | 0 | 2
FE3 | McGill | 2 | 3 | 0
ME2 | Toronto | 2 | 2 | -
ME3 | Queen's | 1 | 0 | -

Division Finals
FE1 | Quebec–Trois-Rivières | 6 | 5 | 3 | - | -
FE2 | Concordia | 2 | 1 | 0 | - | -
East
ME1 | Guelph | 5 | 6 | 6* | - | -
ME2 | Toronto | 3 | 2 | 5 | - | -

Queen's Cup Semifinals
FE1 | Quebec–Trois-Rivières | ?
ME1 | Guelph | ?
Queen's Cup Final
MW1 | Quebec–Trois-Rivières | 1
FW1 | Windsor | 6

Mini-games in italics.
Note: * denotes overtime period(s)

== 1999 ==
| Far East | | | Mid East | | | Mid West | | | Far West | | |
| Seed | School | Standings | Seed | School | Standings | Seed | School | Standings | Seed | School | Standings |
|---|---|---|---|---|---|---|---|---|---|---|---|
| 1 | Quebec–Trois-Rivières | 20–5–1 | 1 | Guelph | 11–10–5 | 1 | York | 8–10–7 | 1 | Windsor | 17–6–3 |
| 2 | Concordia | 16–7–3 | 2 | Queen's | 5–14–7 | 2 | Brock | 10–14–2 | 2 | Wilfrid Laurier | 14–7–5 |
| 3 | Ottawa | 17–9–0 | 3 | Toronto | 6–16–4 | 3 | Laurentian | 8–13–5 | 3 | Waterloo | 11–8–7 |
| 4 | McGill | 13–9–4 | 4 | Royal Military College | 4–21–1 | 4 | Ryerson | 6–19–0 | 4 | Western Ontario | 14–12–0 |

Division Semifinals
FE2 | Concordia | 3 | 6 | -
FE3 | Ottawa | 1 | 3 | -
ME2 | Queen's | 1 | 4 | 3****
ME3 | Toronto | 2 | 0 | 2

Division Finals
FE1 | Quebec–Trois-Rivières | 3 | 5 | -
FE2 | Concordia | 1 | 1 | -
East
ME1 | Guelph | 5 | 6 | 4
ME2 | Queen's | 0 | 7 | 2

Queen's Cup Semifinals
FE1 | Quebec–Trois-Rivières | 3
ME1 | Guelph | 1
Queen's Cup Final
MW1 | York | 7
FW1 | York | 1

Note: * denotes overtime period(s)

== 2000 ==
| Far East | | | Mid East | | | Mid West | | | Far West | | |
| Seed | School | Standings | Seed | School | Standings | Seed | School | Standings | Seed | School | Standings |
|---|---|---|---|---|---|---|---|---|---|---|---|
| 1 | Quebec–Trois-Rivières | 20–2–4 | 1 | Guelph | 10–12–4 | 1 | Brock | 13–10–3 | 1 | Western Ontario | 19–3–4 |
| 2 | McGill | 21–5–0 | 2 | Toronto | 10–13–3 | T–2 | Laurentian | 9–14–3 | 2 | Windsor | 11–9–6 |
| 3 | Concordia | 14–9–3 | 3 | Queen's | 9–15–2 | T–2 | York | 9–14–3 | 3 | Wilfrid Laurier | 11–10–5 |
| 4 | Ottawa | 8–14–4 | 4 | Royal Military College | 3–23–0 | 4 | Ryerson | 9–16–1 | 4 | Waterloo | 9–16–1 |

Note: York forfeited six wins during the season for using an ineligible player.

Division Semifinals
FE2 | McGill | 6 | 4 | -
FE3 | Concordia | 4 | 2 | -
ME2 | Toronto | 5 | 2 | 4
ME3 | Queen's | 4 | 4 | 6

Division Finals
FE1 | Quebec–Trois-Rivières | 2 | 6 | 5
FE2 | McGill | 4 | 0 | 2
East
ME1 | Guelph | 3 | 2 | -
ME3 | Queen's | 4 | 3 | -

Queen's Cup Semifinals
FE1 | Quebec–Trois-Rivières | 3
ME3 | Queen's | 1
Queen's Cup Final
MW3 | York | 3
FW1 | Western Ontario | 5

Note: * denotes overtime period(s)

== 2001 ==
| Far East | | | Mid East | | | Mid West | | | Far West | | |
| Seed | School | Standings | Seed | School | Standings | Seed | School | Standings | Seed | School | Standings |
|---|---|---|---|---|---|---|---|---|---|---|---|
| 1 | Quebec–Trois-Rivières | 21–1–2 | 1 | Toronto | 13–10–1 | 1 | York | 15–6–3 | 1 | Western Ontario | 21–3–0 |
| 2 | Concordia | 10–9–5 | 2 | Queen's | 6–16–2 | T–2 | Brock | 11–11–2 | 2 | Waterloo | 15–7–2 |
| 3 | McGill | 10–11–3 | 3 | Royal Military College | 5–19–0 | T–2 | Guelph | 11–11–2 | 3 | Wilfrid Laurier | 9–11–4 |
| 4 | Ottawa | 6–16–2 | | | | 4 | Ryerson | 4–20–0 | 4 | Windsor | 8–14–2 |

Division Semifinals
FE2 | Concordia | 2 | 3 | -
FE3 | McGill | 1 | 2 | -
ME2 | Queen's | 2 | 0 | -
ME3 | Royal Military College | 3 | 5 | -

Division Finals
FE1 | Quebec–Trois-Rivières | 2 | 8 | -
FE2 | Concordia | 1 | 2 | -
East
ME1 | Toronto | 10 | 2 | 4
ME3 | Royal Military College | 0 | 5 | 1

Queen's Cup Semifinals
FE1 | Quebec–Trois-Rivières | 4
ME1 | Toronto | 1
Queen's Cup Final
MW1 | York | 4
FW1 | Western Ontario | 7

Note: * denotes overtime period(s)

== 2002 ==
| Far East | | | Mid East | | | Mid West | | | Far West | | |
| Seed | School | Standings | Seed | School | Standings | Seed | School | Standings | Seed | School | Standings |
|---|---|---|---|---|---|---|---|---|---|---|---|
| T–1 | Ottawa | 15–8–1 | 1 | Toronto | 13–7–4 | 1 | York | 17–4–3 | 1 | Western Ontario | 22–0–2 |
| T–1 | Quebec–Trois-Rivières | 15–8–1 | 2 | Ryerson | 10–14–0 | 2 | Guelph | 11–12–1 | 2 | Lakehead | 13–8–3 |
| 3 | McGill | 13–9–2 | 3 | Royal Military College | 8–15–1 | T–3 | Brock | 7–13–4 | 3 | Windsor | 8–15–1 |
| 4 | Concordia | 11–12–1 | 4 | Queen's | 4–19–1 | T–3 | Wilfrid Laurier | 8–14–2 | 4 | Waterloo | 3–20–1 |

Division Semifinals
FE2 | Quebec–Trois-Rivières | 2 | 2 | -
FE3 | McGill | 0 | 1 | -
ME2 | Ryerson | 7 | 3 | -
ME3 | Royal Military College | 4 | 2 | -

Division Finals
FE1 | Ottawa | 1 | 2 | -
FE2 | Quebec–Trois-Rivières | 3 | 4 | -
East
ME1 | Toronto | 3 | 5 | -
ME2 | Ryerson | 2 | 2 | -

Queen's Cup Semifinals
FE2 | Quebec–Trois-Rivières | 4*
ME1 | Toronto | 3
Queen's Cup Final
MW1 | York | 5
FW1 | Western Ontario | 5

Note: * denotes overtime period(s)

== 2003 ==
| Far East | | | Mid East | | | Mid West | | | Far West | | |
| Seed | School | Standings | Seed | School | Standings | Seed | School | Standings | Seed | School | Standings |
|---|---|---|---|---|---|---|---|---|---|---|---|
| 1 | Quebec–Trois-Rivières | 20–2–2 | 1 | Toronto | 16–5–3 | 1 | York | 17–6–1 | 1 | Western Ontario | 24–0–0 |
| 2 | McGill | 16–6–2 | 2 | Queen's | 7–17–0 | 2 | Wilfrid Laurier | 12–11–1 | 2 | Lakehead | 18–6–0 |
| 3 | Ottawa | 13–9–2 | 3 | Royal Military College | 6–17–1 | 3 | Brock | 8–16–0 | 3 | Windsor | 8–15–1 |
| 4 | Concordia | 9–13–2 | 4 | Ryerson | 2–21–1 | 4 | Guelph | 6–17–1 | 4 | Waterloo | 1–22–1 |

Division Semifinals
FE2 | McGill | 2 | 2 | -
FE3 | Ottawa | 3 | 3 | -
ME2 | Queen's | 4 | 3 | -
ME3 | Royal Military College | 1 | 2 | -

Division Finals
FE1 | Quebec–Trois-Rivières | 11 | 2 | -
FE3 | Ottawa | 2 | 1 | -
East
ME1 | Toronto | 1 | 0 | 5
ME2 | Queen's | 0 | 2 | 1

Semifinals
FE1 | Quebec–Trois-Rivières | 6
ME1 | Toronto | 3
Gold Medal Game
MW1 | York | 7
MW1 | York | 1

Note: * denotes overtime period(s)

== 2004 ==
| Far East | | | Mid East | | | Mid West | | | Far West | | |
| Seed | School | Standings | Seed | School | Standings | Seed | School | Standings | Seed | School | Standings |
|---|---|---|---|---|---|---|---|---|---|---|---|
| 1 | Ottawa | 17–3–3–1 | 1 | Toronto | 9–10–4–1 | 1 | York | 15–5–4–0 | 1 | Western Ontario | 21–3–0–0 |
| 2 | Quebec–Trois-Rivières | 14–5–4–1 | 2 | Queen's | 9–13–2–0 | 2 | Brock | 13–8–3–0 | 2 | Lakehead | 18–4–2–0 |
| 3 | Concordia | 11–10–3–0 | 3 | Royal Military College | 3–20–0–1 | 3 | Wilfrid Laurier | 10–8–3–3 | 3 | Waterloo | 8–14–0–2 |
| 4 | McGill | 9–9–4–2 | 4 | Ryerson | 3–21–0–0 | 4 | Guelph | 8–12–2–2 | 4 | Windsor | 7–17–0–0 |

Division Quarterfinals
FE2 | Quebec–Trois-Rivières | 3 | 4 | -
FE3 | Concordia | 2 | 0 | -
ME2 | Queen's | 2 | 7 | -
ME3 | Royal Military College | 1 | 1 | -

Division Semifinals
FE1 | Ottawa | 2 | 8 | 4
FE2 | Quebec–Trois-Rivières | 4 | 1 | 3
East
ME1 | Toronto | 9 | 5 | -
ME2 | Queen's | 2 | 3 | -

Division Finals
FE1 | Ottawa | 4
ME1 | Toronto | 2
Queen's Cup Final
MW1 | York | 2
MW1 | York | 2

Note: * denotes overtime period(s)

== 2005 ==
| Far East | | | Mid East | | | Mid West | | | Far West | | |
| Seed | School | Standings | Seed | School | Standings | Seed | School | Standings | Seed | School | Standings |
|---|---|---|---|---|---|---|---|---|---|---|---|
| 1 | McGill | 17–6–1–0 | 1 | Toronto | 12–11–1–0 | 1 | York | 12–6–5–1 | 1 | Western Ontario | 17–6–0–1 |
| 2 | Quebec–Trois-Rivières | 15–5–3–1 | 2 | Royal Military College | 8–10–0–6 | 2 | Wilfrid Laurier | 12–10–2–0 | 2 | Lakehead | 15–8–1–0 |
| 3 | Concordia | 14–8–1–1 | 3 | Queen's | 8–14–0–2 | 3 | Guelph | 8–11–4–1 | 3 | Waterloo | 13–8–3–0 |
| 4 | Ottawa | 13–8–2–1 | 4 | Ryerson | 1–22–0–1 | 4 | Brock | 6–16–1–1 | 4 | Windsor | 7–10–4–3 |

Division Quarterfinals
E3 | Quebec–Trois-Rivières | ? | ? | - | 2
E6 | Royal Military College | ? | ? | - | 0
E4 | Concordia | ? | ? | ? | 1
E5 | Ottawa | ? | ? | ? | 2

Division Semifinals
E1 | McGill | ? | ? | - | 2
E5 | Ottawa | ? | ? | - | 0
East
E2 | Toronto | 1 | 2 | - | 0
E3 | Quebec–Trois-Rivières | 7 | 6 | - | 2

Division Finals
E1 | McGill | ? | ? | ? | 1
E3 | Quebec–Trois-Rivières | ? | ? | ? | 2
Queen's Cup Final
E3 | Quebec–Trois-Rivières | ?
W1 | Western Ontario | ?

Note: Scores for individual games in the first three rounds are mostly unavailable. The aggregate results presented are for the series.
Note: * denotes overtime period(s)

== 2006 ==
| Far East | | | Mid East | | | Mid West | | | Far West | | |
| Seed | School | Standings | Seed | School | Standings | Seed | School | Standings | Seed | School | Standings |
|---|---|---|---|---|---|---|---|---|---|---|---|
| 1 | McGill | 20–1–3–0 | 1 | Toronto | 8–13–2–1 | 1 | Wilfrid Laurier | 13–8–2–1 | 1 | Western Ontario | 21–2–1–0 |
| 2 | Quebec–Trois-Rivières | 16–6–2–0 | 2 | Royal Military College | 7–12–5–0 | 2 | York | 10–11–1–2 | 2 | Waterloo | 15–6–3–0 |
| 3 | Ottawa | 13–8–2–1 | 3 | Queen's | 7–15–1–1 | 3 | Brock | 9–11–2–2 | 3 | Lakehead | 13–9–2–0 |
| 4 | Concordia | 7–11–3–3 | 4 | Ryerson | 1–21–1–1 | 4 | Guelph | 7–14–3–0 | 4 | Windsor | 7–12–3–2 |

Division Quarterfinals
E3 | Quebec–Trois-Rivières | 7 | 6 | -
E6 | Royal Military College | 2 | 1 | -
E4 | Ottawa | 1 | 4* | 6
E5 | Concordia | 4 | 3 | 4

Division Semifinals
E1 | McGill | 1 | 4 | 3
E4 | Ottawa | 2 | 3 | 1
East
E2 | Toronto | 1 | 2 | -
E3 | Quebec–Trois-Rivières | 2 | 3 | -

Division Finals
E1 | McGill | 4 | 3* | -
E3 | Quebec–Trois-Rivières | 3 | 2 | -
Queen's Cup Final
W4 | Lakehead | 4
W4 | Lakehead | 1

Note: * denotes overtime period(s)

== 2007 ==
| Far East | | | Mid East | | | Mid West | | | Far West | | |
| Seed | School | Standings | Seed | School | Standings | Seed | School | Standings | Seed | School | Standings |
|---|---|---|---|---|---|---|---|---|---|---|---|
| 1 | Quebec–Trois-Rivières | 17–5–3–3 | 1 | Toronto | 18–9–1–0 | 1 | Wilfrid Laurier | 22–5–1–0 | 1 | Waterloo | 21–4–2–1 |
| 2 | McGill | 15–7–5–1 | 2 | Queen's | 8–14–5–1 | 2 | York | 13–10–3–2 | 2 | Western Ontario | 17–6–3–2 |
| 3 | Ottawa | 11–12–3–2 | 3 | Royal Military College | 7–16–4–1 | 3 | Brock | 14–12–1–1 | 3 | Lakehead | 13–10–3–2 |
| 4 | Concordia | 8–16–3–1 | 4 | Ryerson | 2–23–2–1 | 4 | Guelph | 7–14–3–4 | 4 | Windsor | 10–17–0–1 |

Division Quarterfinals
E3 | McGill | 6 | 5 | 8
E6 | Concordia | 3 | 6* | 0
E4 | Ottawa | 2 | 1 | -
E5 | Queen's | 1 | 0 | -

Division Semifinals
E1 | Quebec–Trois-Rivières | 3 | 2 | 4
E4 | Ottawa | 0 | 5 | 2
East
E2 | Toronto | 1 | 2 | -
E3 | McGill | 0 | 0 | -

Division Finals
E1 | Quebec–Trois-Rivières | 7* | 5* | -
E2 | Toronto | 6 | 4 | -
Queen's Cup Final
W1 | Wilfrid Laurier | 5
W1 | Wilfrid Laurier | 3

Note: * denotes overtime period(s)

== 2008 ==
| Far East | | | Mid East | | | Mid West | | | Far West | | |
| Seed | School | Standings | Seed | School | Standings | Seed | School | Standings | Seed | School | Standings |
|---|---|---|---|---|---|---|---|---|---|---|---|
| 1 | Quebec–Trois-Rivières | 22–5–0–1 | 1 | Queen's | 13–12–0–3 | 1 | Brock | 17–8–1–2 | 1 | Lakehead | 23–4–0–1 |
| 2 | McGill | 18–9–0–1 | 2 | Toronto | 13–13–0–2 | 2 | York | 14–11–2–1 | 2 | Western Ontario | 18–5–1–4 |
| 3 | Ottawa | 14–12–0–2 | 3 | Royal Military College | 10–16–0–2 | 3 | Guelph | 12–13–1–2 | 3 | Waterloo | 18–10–0–0 |
| 4 | Carleton | 12–13–2–1 | 4 | Ryerson | 9–16–1–2 | 4 | Ontario Tech | 6–19–2–1 | 4 | Wilfrid Laurier | 16–9–1–2 |
| 5 | Concordia | 11–14–2–1 | | | | | | | 5 | Windsor | 6–21–0–1 |

Division Quarterfinals; February 13–17
E3 | McGill | 5 | 5 | -
E6 | Carleton | 1 | 3 | -
E4 | Ottawa | 3* | 1 | 3*
E5 | Toronto | 2 | 3 | 2

Division Semifinals; February 20–24
E1 | Quebec–Trois-Rivières | 4 | 6 | -
E4 | Ottawa | 0 | 4 | -
East
E2 | Queen's | 1 | 0 | -
E3 | McGill | 6 | 2 | -

Division Finals; February 27–March 1
E1 | Quebec–Trois-Rivières | 1 | 1 | -
E3 | McGill | 4 | 2 | -
Queen's Cup Final; March 8
W1 | Lakehead | 2
W2 | Brock | 4

Note: * denotes overtime period(s)

== 2009 ==
| Far East | | | Mid East | | | Mid West | | | Far West | | |
| Seed | School | Standings | Seed | School | Standings | Seed | School | Standings | Seed | School | Standings |
|---|---|---|---|---|---|---|---|---|---|---|---|
| 1 | Quebec–Trois-Rivières | 21–4–3–0 | 1 | Toronto | 14–11–1–2 | 1 | York | 14–11–0–3 | 1 | Wilfrid Laurier | 22–5–1–0 |
| 2 | McGill | 18–8–1–1 | 2 | Queen's | 12–13–1–2 | 2 | Guelph | 14–12–1–1 | 2 | Western Ontario | 19–7–2–0 |
| 3 | Concordia | 14–12–0–2 | 3 | Royal Military College | 8–18–1–1 | 3 | Brock | 9–14–3–2 | 3 | Waterloo | 18–7–0–3 |
| 4 | Carleton | 13–11–3–1 | 4 | Ryerson | 5–22–0–1 | 4 | Ontario Tech | 7–16–4–1 | 4 | Lakehead | 18–8–1–1 |
| 5 | Ottawa | 12–11–3–2 | | | | | | | 5 | Windsor | 13–13–0–2 |

Division Quarterfinals; February 18–22
E3 | McGill | 5 | 2 | 2
E6 | Ottawa | 1 | 3 | 1
E4 | Concordia | 6 | 1 | 2
E5 | Carleton | 3 | 2 | 3

Division Semifinals; February 25–March 1
E1 | Quebec–Trois-Rivières | 2 | 2 | 5**
E5 | Carleton | 4 | 1 | 4
East
E2 | Toronto | 2 | 3 | -
E3 | McGill | 3 | 6 | -

Division Finals; March 4–7
E1 | Quebec–Trois-Rivières | 1 | 1 | -
E3 | McGill | 3 | 2 | -
Queen's Cup Final; March 14
W1 | Wilfrid Laurier | 3
W3 | Western Ontario | 4

Note: * denotes overtime period(s)

== 2010 ==
| East | | | West | | |
| Seed | School | Standings | Seed | School | Standings |
|---|---|---|---|---|---|
| 1 | Quebec–Trois-Rivières | 23–3–1–1 | 1 | Western Ontario | 21–7–0–0 |
| 2 | McGill | 22–6–0–0 | 2 | Waterloo | 20–7–0–1 |
| 3 | Toronto | 15–9–2–2 | 3 | Lakehead | 19–7–0–2 |
| 4 | Carleton | 15–10–1–2 | 4 | Wilfrid Laurier | 17–7–4–0 |
| 5 | Queen's | 14–12–1–1 | 5 | Guelph | 14–10–0–4 |
| 6 | Ryerson | 12–13–0–3 | 6 | York | 12–13–3–0 |
| 7 | Nipissing | 12–15–0–1 | 7 | Windsor | 10–13–3–2 |
| 8 | Concordia | 8–16–1–3 | 8 | Ontario Tech | 11–15–0–2 |
| 9 | Royal Military College | 6–18–3–1 | 9 | Brock | 9–17–1–1 |
| 10 | Ottawa | 6–20–2–0 | | | |

Division Quarterfinals; February 17–21
E1 | Quebec–Trois-Rivières | 6 | 4 | -
E8 | Concordia | 2 | 2 | -
E2 | McGill | 4 | 7 | -
E7 | Nipissing | 1 | 2 | -
East
E3 | Toronto | 0 | 1 | -
E6 | Ryerson | 6 | 3 | -
E4 | Carleton | 3 | 4 | 3**
E5 | Queen's | 4** | 1 | 2
W1 | Western Ontario | 1 | 4 | 5
W8 | Ontario Tech | 2 | 2 | 1
W2 | Waterloo | 2 | 4 | 2
W7 | Windsor | 4 | 3 | 3**
West
W3 | Lakehead | 2 | 9 | 6
W6 | York | 3** | 5 | 2
W4 | Wilfrid Laurier | 0 | 3 | 3
W5 | Guelph | 3 | 2 | 5

Division Semifinals; February 24–28
E1 | Quebec–Trois-Rivières | 6 | 6 | -
E6 | Ryerson | 3 | 3 | -
E2 | McGill | 2 | 5 | 6
E4 | Carleton | 5 | 1 | 2
W1 | Western Ontario | 5 | 3 | -
W7 | Windsor | 2 | 1 | -
W3 | Lakehead | 4* | 5* | -
W5 | Guelph | 3 | 4 | -

Division Finals; March 3–6
E1 | Quebec–Trois-Rivières | 2 | 4 | -
E2 | McGill | 3 | 7 | -
W1 | Western Ontario | 1 | 2 | -
W3 | Lakehead | 4 | 5 | -

Queen's Cup Final; March 13
E2 | McGill | 3
W3 | Lakehead | 1
Bronze Medal Game
E1 | Quebec–Trois-Rivières | 5
W1 | Western Ontario | 4

Note: * denotes overtime period(s)

== 2011 ==
| East | | | West | | |
| Seed | School | Standings | Seed | School | Standings |
|---|---|---|---|---|---|
| 1 | McGill | 24–2–0–2 | 1 | Western Ontario | 20–3–2–3 |
| 2 | Quebec–Trois-Rivières | 19–8–1–0 | 2 | Wilfrid Laurier | 15–7–2–4 |
| 3 | Carleton | 18–8–0–2 | 3 | Lakehead | 16–9–3–0 |
| 4 | Nipissing | 17–8–0–3 | 4 | Guelph | 15–10–1–2 |
| 5 | Queen's | 14–11–3–0 | 5 | Brock | 13–9–4–2 |
| 6 | Toronto | 10–11–5–2 | 6 | Waterloo | 15–12–0–1 |
| 7 | Concordia | 12–14–2–0 | T–7 | Ontario Tech | 12–12–2–2 |
| 8 | Ottawa | 11–14–1–2 | T–7 | Windsor | 12–12–2–2 |
| 9 | Ryerson | 8–18–1–1 | 9 | York | 10–16–1–1 |
| 10 | Royal Military College | 5–22–1–0 | | | |

Division Quarterfinals; February 16–20
E1 | McGill | 2 | 10 | -
E8 | Ottawa | 1 | 5 | -
E2 | Quebec–Trois-Rivières | 5 | 3 | 5
E7 | Concordia | 2 | 5 | 3
East
E3 | Carleton | 1 | 7 | 4
E6 | Toronto | 2 | 3 | 0
E4 | Nipissing | 7 | 6 | -
E5 | Queen's | 0 | 3 | -
W1 | Western Ontario | 4 | 4 | -
W8 | Windsor | 1 | 2 | -
W2 | Wilfrid Laurier | 1 | 2** | 2
W7 | Ontario Tech | 2* | 1 | 1
West
W3 | Lakehead | 0 | 0 | -
W6 | Waterloo | 5 | 3 | -
W4 | Guelph | 3 | 3 | 8
W5 | Brock | 2 | 4 | 5

Division Semifinals; February 23–27
E1 | McGill | 4 | 6 | -
E4 | Nipissing | 1 | 4 | -
E2 | Quebec–Trois-Rivières | 4 | 1 | 4
E3 | Carleton | 2 | 4 | 0
W1 | Western Ontario | 4 | 1 | 6
W6 | Waterloo | 2 | 2 | 0
W2 | Wilfrid Laurier | 0 | 3 | 1
W4 | Guelph | 3 | 0 | 2

Division Finals; March 2–6
E1 | McGill | 5 | 1 | 6
E2 | Quebec–Trois-Rivières | 3 | 6 | 1
W1 | Western Ontario | 4 | 4 | -
W4 | Guelph | 1 | 2 | -

Queen's Cup Final; March 12
E1 | McGill | 6
W1 | Western Ontario | 2

Note: * denotes overtime period(s)

== 2012 ==
| East | | | West | | |
| Seed | School | Standings | Seed | School | Standings |
|---|---|---|---|---|---|
| 1 | McGill | 22–4–2–0 | 1 | Western Ontario | 21–4–1–2 |
| 2 | Quebec–Trois-Rivières | 19–7–1–1 | 2 | Lakehead | 19–9–0–0 |
| 3 | Nipissing | 17–7–1–3 | 3 | Waterloo | 15–9–3–1 |
| 4 | Toronto | 16–9–2–1 | 4 | York | 14–10–1–3 |
| 5 | Carleton | 15–10–1–2 | 5 | Windsor | 15–12–0–1 |
| T–6 | Ottawa | 14–13–0–1 | 6 | Brock | 13–14–1–0 |
| T–6 | Ryerson | 13–12–1–2 | 7 | Guelph | 9–14–3–2 |
| T–8 | Queen's | 13–13–0–2 | 8 | Wilfrid Laurier | 9–17–1–1 |
| T–8 | Concordia | 13–13–1–1 | 9 | Ontario Tech | 6–21–1–0 |
| 10 | Royal Military College | 3–23–2–0 | | | |

Division Quarterfinals; February 15–19
E1 | McGill | 3 | 5 | -
E8 | Queen's | 2 | 1 | -
E2 | Quebec–Trois-Rivières | 2 | 7 | 5
E7 | Ryerson | 9 | 5 | 3
East
E3 | Nipissing | 2 | 1 | -
E6 | Ottawa | 5 | 3 | -
E4 | Toronto | 2 | 3 | 3
E5 | Carleton | 6 | 0 | 4**
W1 | Western Ontario | 4 | 2 | -
W8 | Wilfrid Laurier | 2 | 1 | -
W2 | Lakehead | 4 | 5 | 3
W7 | Guelph | 5 | 1 | 2
West
W3 | Waterloo | 1 | 4 | -
W6 | Brock | 2** | 7 | -
W4 | York | 4 | 1 | -
W5 | Windsor | 5* | 5 | -

Division Semifinals; February 22–26
E1 | McGill | 5 | 5 | -
E6 | Ottawa | 3 | 3 | -
E2 | Quebec–Trois-Rivières | 8 | 1 | 3**
E5 | Carleton | 1 | 5 | 2
W1 | Western Ontario | 5 | 3 | -
W6 | Brock | 3 | 2 | -
W2 | Lakehead | 3* | 1 | 2
W5 | Windsor | 2 | 4 | 3*

Division Finals; February 29–March 4
E1 | McGill | 5 | 5** | -
E2 | Quebec–Trois-Rivières | 3 | 4 | -
W1 | Western Ontario | 3 | 5 | 2
W5 | Windsor | 4 | 2 | 0

Queen's Cup Final; March 10
E1 | McGill | 4
W1 | Western Ontario | 1
Bronze Medal Game
E2 | Quebec–Trois-Rivières | 5
W5 | Windsor | 3

Note: * denotes overtime period(s)

== 2013 ==
| East | | | West | | |
| Seed | School | Standings | Seed | School | Standings |
|---|---|---|---|---|---|
| 1 | Quebec–Trois-Rivières | 21–6–0–1 | 1 | Western Ontario | 21–5–1–1 |
| 2 | Carleton | 19–7–1–1 | 2 | Windsor | 18–9–0–1 |
| 3 | McGill | 17–7–0–4 | T–3 | Lakehead | 17–9–1–1 |
| 4 | Ottawa | 16–8–2–2 | T–3 | Guelph | 17–9–0–2 |
| 5 | Toronto | 13–9–3–3 | 5 | Wilfrid Laurier | 14–12–2–0 |
| 6 | Nipissing | 14–12–1–1 | 6 | Waterloo | 12–11–0–5 |
| 7 | Queen's | 10–11–6–1 | 7 | York | 14–14–0–0 |
| 8 | Ryerson | 12–16–0–0 | T–8 | Ontario Tech | 11–16–0–1 |
| 9 | Concordia | 8–15–2–3 | T–8 | Brock | 9–14–4–1 |
| 10 | Royal Military College | 3–22–2–1 | | | |

Division Quarterfinals; February 13–17
E1 | Quebec–Trois-Rivières | 5 | 7 | -
E8 | Ryerson | 2 | 3 | -
E2 | Carleton | 10 | 2 | -
E7 | Queen's | 2 | 1 | -
East
E3 | McGill | 2 | 4 | 1
E6 | Nipissing | 4 | 1 | 2
E4 | Ottawa | 3** | 0 | 3**
E5 | Toronto | 2 | 4 | 2
W1 | Western Ontario | 8 | 5 | -
W8 | Ontario Tech | 1 | 2 | -
W2 | Windsor | 3** | 4 | -
W7 | York | 2 | 2 | -
West
W3 | Lakehead | 2 | 2 | -
W6 | Waterloo | 7 | 4 | -
W4 | Guelph | 3 | 3* | 3
W5 | Wilfrid Laurier | 4** | 2 | 2

Division Semifinals; February 20–24
E1 | Quebec–Trois-Rivières | 3 | 8 | -
E6 | Nipissing | 1 | 3 | -
E2 | Carleton | 3 | 3 | 6
E4 | Ottawa | 1 | 4 | 0
W1 | Western Ontario | 3 | 3 | 3
W6 | Waterloo | 1 | 4 | 5
W2 | Windsor | 2 | 1 | -
W4 | Guelph | 1 | 0 | -

Division Finals; February 27–March 3
E1 | Quebec–Trois-Rivières | 1 | 2 | 2****
E2 | Carleton | 4 | 0 | 1
W6 | Waterloo | 3* | 5 | -
W2 | Windsor | 2 | 3 | -

Queen's Cup Final; March 9
E1 | Quebec–Trois-Rivières | 4
W6 | Waterloo | 1

Note: * denotes overtime period(s)

== 2014 ==
| East | | | West | | |
| Seed | School | Standings | Seed | School | Standings |
|---|---|---|---|---|---|
| 1 | Carleton | 22–5–1–0 | 1 | Western Ontario | 21–6–1–0 |
| T–2 | Quebec–Trois-Rivières | 22–6–0–0 | 2 | Lakehead | 17–8–2–1 |
| T–2 | McGill | 21–5–1–1 | T–3 | Ryerson | 17–11–0–0 |
| 4 | Queen's | 17–6–2–3 | T–3 | Windsor | 17–11–0–0 |
| 5 | Ottawa | 17–10–0–1 | T–5 | Toronto | 15–11–1–1 |
| 6 | Concordia | 11–13–2–2 | T–5 | Brock | 14–10–2–2 |
| 7 | Ontario Tech | 8–16–3–1 | T–7 | York | 13–13–1–1 |
| 8 | Nipissing | 7–16–2–3 | T–7 | Guelph | 12–12–2–2 |
| 9 | Laurentian | 5–22–0–1 | T–7 | Waterloo | 12–12–2–2 |
| 10 | Royal Military College | 3–22–2–1 | 10 | Wilfrid Laurier | 9–17–2–0 |

Division Quarterfinals; February 19–23
E1 | Carleton | 4 | 4 | -
E8 | Nipissing | 2 | 0 | -
E2 | Quebec–Trois-Rivières | 8 | 5 | -
E7 | Ontario Tech | 3 | 3 | -
East
E3 | McGill | 3 | 8 | -
E6 | Concordia | 1 | 4 | -
E4 | Queen's | 3 | 2 | -
E5 | Ottawa | 2 | 1 | -
W1 | Western Ontario | 4 | 2** | 6
W8 | Guelph | 5 | 1 | 1
W2 | Lakehead | 4 | 5 | -
W7 | York | 2 | 2 | -
West
W3 | Ryerson | 4* | 4 | 6
W6 | Brock | 3 | 6 | 3
W4 | Windsor | 3 | 5 | -
W5 | Toronto | 2 | 2 | -

Division Semifinals; February 26–March 2
E1 | Carleton | 6 | 1 | 2
E4 | Queen's | 2 | 2 | 0
E2 | Quebec–Trois-Rivières | 3 | 1 | -
E3 | McGill | 4* | 4 | -
W1 | Western Ontario | 3 | 1 | 1
W4 | Windsor | 2 | 3 | 3
W2 | Lakehead | 7 | 5 | -
W3 | Ryerson | 0 | 1 | -

Division Finals; March 6–9
E1 | Carleton | 5 | 2 | 1
E2 | McGill | 2 | 3 | 2
W4 | Windsor | 7 | 6 | -
W2 | Lakehead | 1 | 2 | -

Queen's Cup Final; March 15
E2 | McGill | 2
W4 | Windsor | 3
Third place
E1 | Carleton | 7
W2 | Lakehead | 4

Note: * denotes overtime period(s)

== 2015 ==
| East | | | West | | |
| Seed | School | Standings | Seed | School | Standings |
|---|---|---|---|---|---|
| 1 | McGill | 21–5–0–0 | 1 | Windsor | 22–4–1–0 |
| T–2 | Carleton | 20–5–0–1 | 2 | Western Ontario | 19–7–1–0 |
| T–2 | Quebec–Trois-Rivières | 19–4–1–2 | 3 | Waterloo | 17–8–1–1 |
| 4 | Laurentian | 14–9–3–0 | 4 | Ryerson | 14–12–1–0 |
| 5 | Queen's | 13–12–1–0 | 5 | Toronto | 13–13–1–0 |
| 6 | Nipissing | 12–12–2–0 | 6 | Guelph | 11–13–3–0 |
| 7 | Ontario Tech | 10–15–1–0 | 7 | Lakehead | 10–14–3–0 |
| 8 | Concordia | 8–17–1–0 | 8 | Brock | 10–15–2–0 |
| 9 | Royal Military College | 0–23–3–0 | T–9 | Wilfrid Laurier | 10–16–1–0 |
| | | | T–9 | York | 9–15–2–1 |

Division Quarterfinals; February 11–15
E1 | McGill | 4 | 5 | 6
E8 | Concordia | 6 | 0 | 3
E2 | Carleton | 5 | 6 | -
E7 | Ontario Tech | 2 | 1 | -
East
E3 | Quebec–Trois-Rivières | 6 | 10 | -
E6 | Nipissing | 3 | 3 | -
E4 | Laurentian | 2 | 1 | 1
E5 | Queen's | 1 | 3 | 2*
W1 | Windsor | 1 | 4 | 4*
W8 | Brock | 2 | 2 | 3
W2 | Western Ontario | 3 | 1 | -
W7 | Lakehead | 4 | 4 | -
West
W3 | Waterloo | 5 | 2 | 1
W6 | Guelph | 0 | 3 | 4
W4 | Ryerson | 1 | 4 | -
W5 | Toronto | 2 | 6 | -

Division Semifinals; February 18–22
E1 | McGill | 2 | 3 | -
E5 | Queen's | 1 | 1 | -
E2 | Carleton | 1 | 3 | -
E3 | Quebec–Trois-Rivières | 2* | 4* | -
W1 | Windsor | 4 | 6 | -
W7 | Lakehead | 3 | 3 | -
W5 | Toronto | 8 | 1 | 3
W6 | Guelph | 3 | 3 | 5

Division Finals; February 25–28
E1 | McGill | 0 | 2 | -
E3 | Quebec–Trois-Rivières | 3 | 4 | -
W1 | Windsor | 1 | 4 | -
W6 | Guelph | 3 | 5 | -

Queen's Cup Final; March 7
E3 | Quebec–Trois-Rivières | 0
W6 | Guelph | 4
Bronze Medal Game
E1 | McGill | 1
W1 | Windsor | 2*

Note: * denotes overtime period(s)

== 2016 ==
| East | | | West | | |
| Seed | School | Standings | Seed | School | Standings |
|---|---|---|---|---|---|
| 1 | Quebec–Trois-Rivières | 24–3–1–0 | 1 | York | 16–7–4–1 |
| 2 | McGill | 21–6–1–0 | 2 | Western Ontario | 18–10–0–0 |
| 3 | Carleton | 20–7–0–1 | T–3 | Waterloo | 16–11–1–0 |
| T–4 | Ontario Tech | 18–8–1–1 | T–3 | Guelph | 16–11–1–0 |
| T–4 | Queen's | 17–7–3–1 | 5 | Windsor | 14–11–1–2 |
| 6 | Nipissing | 12–12–3–1 | 6 | Ryerson | 14–13–1–0 |
| 7 | Concordia | 10–12–6–0 | 7 | Wilfrid Laurier | 14–14–0–0 |
| 8 | Laurentian | 7–15–5–1 | 8 | Toronto | 11–15–2–0 |
| 9 | Royal Military College | 4–21–3–0 | 9 | Lakehead | 8–16–3–1 |
| | | | 10 | Brock | 6–15–6–1 |

Division Quarterfinals; February 17–21
E1 | Quebec–Trois-Rivières | 4 | 3 | -
E8 | Laurentian | 1 | 2 | -
E2 | McGill | 9 | 4* | -
E7 | Concordia | 2 | 3 | -
East
E3 | Carleton | 3 | 6 | -
E6 | Nipissing | 0 | 1 | -
E4 | Ontario Tech | 3 | 4* | 4
E5 | Queen's | 4* | 3 | 3
W1 | York | 5 | 2 | 1
W8 | Toronto | 0 | 3 | 4
W2 | Western Ontario | 8 | 4 | -
W7 | Wilfrid Laurier | 3 | 1 | -
West
W3 | Waterloo | 2 | 4 | -
W6 | Ryerson | 4 | 5* | -
W4 | Guelph | 6 | 2 | 3*
W5 | Windsor | 2 | 5 | 2

Division Semifinals; February 24–28
E1 | Quebec–Trois-Rivières | 6 | 4 | -
E4 | Ontario Tech | 1 | 2 | -
E2 | McGill | 2 | 2 | -
E3 | Carleton | 5 | 3* | -
W2 | Western Ontario | 1 | 7 | 4*
W8 | Toronto | 3 | 3 | 3
W4 | Guelph | 5 | 1 | 11
W6 | Ryerson | 3 | 2* | 3

Division Finals; March 2–6
E1 | Quebec–Trois-Rivières | 4 | 6 | -
E3 | Carleton | 1 | 3 | -
W2 | Western Ontario | 2 | 1 | 5
W3 | Guelph | 1 | 3 | 1

Queen's Cup Final; March 12
E1 | Quebec–Trois-Rivières | 4*
W2 | Western Ontario | 3
Bronze Medal Game
E3 | Carleton | 4
W3 | Guelph | 1

Note: * denotes overtime period(s)

== 2017 ==
| East | | | West | | |
| Seed | School | Standings | Seed | School | Standings |
|---|---|---|---|---|---|
| 1 | McGill | 21–4–2–1 | 1 | Ryerson | 22–4–2–0 |
| 2 | Concordia | 19–7–2–0 | 2 | York | 18–6–3–1 |
| 3 | Queen's | 18–7–2–1 | 3 | Wilfrid Laurier | 15–9–3–1 |
| T–4 | Quebec–Trois-Rivières | 16–9–1–2 | 4 | Guelph | 15–12–1–0 |
| T–4 | Carleton | 16–9–2–1 | 5 | Brock | 14–13–1–0 |
| T–4 | Ottawa | 15–8–4–1 | T–6 | Windsor | 13–13–1–1 |
| 7 | Ontario Tech | 16–11–1–0 | T–6 | Lakehead | 13–13–2–0 |
| 8 | Laurentian | 11–12–5–0 | T–6 | Waterloo | 12–12–4–0 |
| 9 | Nipissing | 8–18–1–1 | 9 | Western Ontario | 8–16–2–2 |
| 10 | Royal Military College | 6–20–1–1 | 10 | Toronto | 5–21–0–2 |

Note: In January 2018, Quebec–Trois-Rivières was ruled to have used an ineligible player and required to forfeit a total of 7 games from this season. The records here are what the standings were at the beginning of the tournament.

Division Quarterfinals; February 15–19
E1 | McGill | 2* | 7 | -
E8 | Laurentian | 1 | 2 | -
E2 | Concordia | 0 | 5 | 3
E7 | Ontario Tech | 4 | 2 | 2
East
E3 | Queen's | 3** | 2 | 2
E6 | Ottawa | 2 | 3** | 0
E4 | Quebec–Trois-Rivières | 2 | 4 | 3
E5 | Carleton | 5 | 2 | 2
W1 | Ryerson | 2 | 4 | 3
W8 | Waterloo | 1 | 5* | 1
W2 | York | 3 | 3 | -
W7 | Lakehead | 2 | 1 | -
West
W3 | Wilfrid Laurier | 4* | 0 | 2
W6 | Windsor | 3 | 1 | 3*
W4 | Guelph | 5 | 4* | -
W5 | Brock | 1 | 3 | -

Division Semifinals; February 22–26
E1 | McGill | 3 | 2 | -
E4 | Quebec–Trois-Rivières | 1 | 1 | -
E2 | Concordia | 1 | 2 | 0
E3 | Queen's | 3 | 0 | 2
W1 | Ryerson | 1 | 1 | -
W6 | Windsor | 4 | 3 | -
W2 | York | 3 | 6 | -
W4 | Guelph | 2 | 2 | -

Division Finals; March 1–4
E1 | McGill | 1 | 1 | -
E3 | Queen's | 2 | 4 | -
W6 | Windsor | 3 | 4 | 3
W2 | York | 5 | 2 | 6

Queen's Cup Final; March 10
E3 | Queen's | 3
W2 | York | 4
Bronze Medal Game
E1 | McGill | 6
W6 | Windsor | 3

Note: * denotes overtime period(s)

== 2018 ==
| East | | | West | | |
| Seed | School | Standings | Seed | School | Standings |
|---|---|---|---|---|---|
| 1 | McGill | 22–4–1–1 | 1 | Guelph | 21–6–1–0 |
| 2 | Queen's | 19–6–3–0 | 2 | York | 17–10–0–1 |
| 3 | Concordia | 18–7–2–1 | T–3 | Ryerson | 15–10–1–2 |
| 4 | Carleton | 17–7–2–2 | T–3 | Wilfrid Laurier | 15–10–1–2 |
| 5 | Ottawa | 16–8–3–1 | T–3 | Brock | 14–9–3–2 |
| 6 | Ontario Tech | 15–9–3–1 | 6 | Western Ontario | 14–11–2–1 |
| 7 | Nipissing | 9–15–2–2 | T–7 | Lakehead | 11–12–3–2 |
| 8 | Laurentian | 10–17–0–1 | T–7 | Windsor | 10–11–4–3 |
| T–9 | Quebec–Trois-Rivières | 9–18–1–0 | 9 | Toronto | 11–16–1–0 |
| T–9 | Royal Military College | 7–16–5–0 | 10 | Waterloo | 9–15–3–1 |

Note: In January 2018, Quebec–Trois-Rivières was ruled to have used an ineligible player and required to forfeit a total of 11 games from this season.

Division Quarterfinals; February 14–18
E1 | McGill | 5 | 9 | -
E8 | Laurentian | 2 | 1 | -
E2 | Queen's | 4* | 6 | -
E7 | Nipissing | 3 | 1 | -
East
E3 | Concordia | 4 | 3* | -
E6 | Ontario Tech | 1 | 2 | -
E4 | Carleton | 3* | 0 | 2
E5 | Ottawa | 2 | 5 | 4
W1 | Guelph | 3 | 3 | 6
W8 | Windsor | 1 | 4 | 1
W2 | York | 2 | 4 | 5
W7 | Lakehead | 3*** | 2 | 1
West
W3 | Ryerson | 4 | 1 | 6
W6 | Western Ontario | 2 | 5 | 3
W4 | Wilfrid Laurier | 0 | 1 | -
W5 | Brock | 3 | 2 | -

Division Semifinals; February 21–25
E1 | McGill | 2 | 4 | 6
E5 | Ottawa | 3 | 1 | 3
E2 | Queen's | 2 | 3 | 2
E3 | Concordia | 4 | 0 | 3*
W1 | Guelph | 3 | 4 | -
W5 | Brock | 4* | 5* | -
W2 | York | 6 | 3 | -
W3 | Ryerson | 3 | 2 | -

Division Finals; February 28–March 4
E1 | McGill | 1 | 3* | 6
E3 | Concordia | 3 | 2 | 2
W5 | Brock | 6 | 3 | 3
W2 | York | 2 | 4* | 2

Queen's Cup Final; March 10
E1 | McGill | 5
W5 | Brock | 1
Bronze Medal Game
E3 | Concordia | 3
W2 | York | 2

Note: * denotes overtime period(s)

== 2019 ==
| East | | | West | | |
| Seed | School | Standings | Seed | School | Standings |
|---|---|---|---|---|---|
| 1 | Ottawa | 22–2–1–3 | 1 | Ryerson | 20–5–2–1 |
| 2 | Carleton | 18–5–2–3 | 2 | Brock | 19–5–4–0 |
| 3 | McGill | 17–7–3–1 | 3 | Western Ontario | 15–12–0–1 |
| 4 | Queen's | 18–10–0–0 | 4 | Guelph | 13–11–0–4 |
| 5 | Ontario Tech | 14–9–4–1 | T–5 | Windsor | 13–14–0–1 |
| 6 | Concordia | 15–11–1–1 | T–5 | Wilfrid Laurier | 13–14–1–0 |
| 7 | Quebec–Trois-Rivières | 14–11–2–1 | T–7 | York | 12–14–2–0 |
| 8 | Laurentian | 9–18–1–0 | T–7 | Toronto | 11–13–3–1 |
| 9 | Nipissing | 8–19–1–0 | T–9 | Lakehead | 12–15–0–1 |
| 10 | Royal Military College | 7–19–2–0 | T–9 | Waterloo | 10–13–4–1 |

Division Quarterfinals; February 13–18
E1 | Ottawa | 8 | 5 | -
E8 | Laurentian | 1 | 1 | -
E2 | Carleton | 4 | 6 | -
E7 | Quebec–Trois-Rivières | 3 | 3 | -
East
E3 | McGill | 6 | 6 | -
E5 | Ontario Tech | 2 | 2 | -
E4 | Queen's | 3 | 5** | -
E6 | Concordia | 2 | 4 | -
W1 | Ryerson | 3* | 4 | -
W8 | Toronto | 2 | 3 | -
W2 | Brock | 2 | 3** | -
W7 | York | 1 | 2 | -
West
W3 | Western Ontario | 3 | 3 | -
W6 | Wilfrid Laurier | 2 | 2 | -
W4 | Guelph | 5* | 4 | -
W5 | Windsor | 4 | 0 | -

Division Semifinals; February 21–25
E1 | Ottawa | 2 | 5 | 5
E4 | Queen's | 3 | 2 | 6
E2 | Carleton | 1 | 5 | 4*
E3 | McGill | 3 | 3 | 3
W1 | Ryerson | 1 | 6* | 3
W4 | Guelph | 4 | 5 | 4
W2 | Brock | 2 | 3 | 1
W3 | Western Ontario | 3 | 2 | 7

Division Finals; February 28–March 4
E4 | Queen's | 3* | 4 | -
E2 | Carleton | 2 | 1 | -
W4 | Guelph | 3 | 6 | 4
W3 | Western Ontario | 4 | 1 | 1

Queen's Cup Final; March 10
E4 | Queen's | 4
W4 | Guelph | 1
Bronze Medal Game
E2 | Carleton | 3
W3 | Western Ontario | 0

Note: * denotes overtime period(s)

=== East Division ===
==== (E1) Ottawa vs. (E8) Laurentian ====
| February 13 | Laurentian | 1 – 8 | Ottawa | Countryside Arena |
| No scoring | | First period | 04:20 – Kevin Domingue (1); 06:44 – pp – Kevin Domingue (2); 08:53 – Kyle Ward (1) |
| Nicolas Dionne (1) – 04:17 | | Second period | 05:18 – Brendan Jacome (1); 12:49 – Kevin Domingue (3); 13:05 – Michael Poirier (1); 18:09 – pp – Eric Locke (1) |
| No scoring | | Third period | 10:58 – Kevin Domingue (4) |
| Michael Giugovaz (25 saves / 30 shots); Mackenzie Savard (5 saves / 8 shots) | | Goalie stats | Anthony Brodeur (17 saves / 18 shots) |

| February 16 | Ottawa | 5 – 1 | Laurentian | Minto Sports Complex Fitness Centre |
| 06:28 – pp – Cody Drover (1) | | First period | Haydn Hopkins (1) – sh – 05:30 |
| 00:31 – Kevin Domingue (5); 13:42 – Kevin Domingue (6); 18:08 – Eric Locke (2) | | Second period | No scoring |
| 12:36 – Marc Beckstead (1) | | Third period | No scoring |
| Anthony Brodeur (29 saves / 30 shots) | | Goalie stats | Michael Giugovaz (33 saves / 38 shots) |

| Ottawa wins series 2 – 0 |

==== (E2) Carleton vs. (E7) Quebec–Trois-Rivières ====
| February 14 | Quebec–Trois-Rivières | 3 – 4 | Carleton | Colisée Jean-Guy Talbot |
| No scoring | | First period | No scoring |
| No scoring | | Second period | 03:56 – Matthew Forchuk (1); 13:41 – Jared Steege (1); 14:28 – Andrew Jarvis (1); 17:49 – Brett Gustavsen (1) |
| Patrice Demuy (1) – 04:59; Jason Lavallée (1) – 17:20; Christophe Boivin (1) – 17:40 | | Third period | No scoring |
| Sébastien Auger (41 saves / 45 shots) | | Goalie stats | François Brassard (33 saves / 36 shots) |

| February 16 | Carleton | 6 – 3 | Quebec–Trois-Rivières | Advanced Capital Ice House |
| 15:55 – Dalen Hedges (1) | | First period | Patrice Demuy (2) – 01:42; Mathieu Boucher (1) – sh – 07:13 |
| 09:42 – Josh Burnside (1); 13:30 – Dalen Hedges (2) | | Second period | No scoring |
| 15:41 – Dakota Odgers (1); 16:05 – Jared Steege (2); 18:00 – Matthew Forchuk (2) | | Third period | Jason Lavallée (2) – 01:10 |
| François Brassard (28 saves / 31 shots) | | Goalie stats | Sébastien Auger (29 saves / 35 shots) |

| Carleton wins series 2 – 0 |

==== (E3) McGill vs. (E5) Ontario Tech ====
| February 13 | Ontario Tech | 2 – 6 | McGill | Campus Ice Centre |
| Brett Harasymuk (1) – 07:24 | | First period | No scoring |
| No scoring | | Second period | 01:44 – Frédéric Gamelin (1); 11:37 – Jordan-Ty Fournier (1); 17:10 – Antoine Dufort-Plante (1); 17:51 – Michael Cramarossa (1) |
| Keaton Holinaty (1) – 14:35 | | Third period | 04:27 – Samuel Tremblay (1); 9:06 – Keanu Yamamoto (1) |
| Brendan O'Neill (33 saves / 39 shots) | | Goalie stats | Louis-Philip Guindon (27 saves / 29 shots) |

| February 16 | McGill | 6 – 2 | Ontario Tech | Arèna McConnell |
| 00:38 – Samuel Tremblay (2); 12:43 – pp – Christophe Lalonde (1); 13:14 – Jordan-Ty Fournier (2); 18:43 – Keanu Yamamoto (2) | | First period | No scoring |
| No scoring | | Second period | Jake Bricknell (1) – pp – 18:38 |
| 09:16 – Maximilien Daigle (1); 10:27 – pp – Samuel Tremblay (3) | | Third period | Jake Patterson (1) – 19:45 |
| Louis-Philip Guindon (20 saves / 22 shots) | | Goalie stats | Michael Bullion (30 saves / 36 shots) |

| McGill wins series 2 – 0 |

==== (E4) Queen's vs. (E6) Concordia ====
| February 13 | Queen's | 3 – 2 | Concordia | Kingston Memorial Centre |
| No scoring | | First period | Charles-Éric Légaré (1) – 16:03 |
| 02:00 – William Brown (1); 17:26 – Spencer Abraham (1) | | Second period | Bradley Lalonde (1) – pp – 11:20 |
| 12:05 – pp – Slater Doggett (1) | | Third period | No scoring |
| Justin Fazio (35 saves / 37 shots) | | Goalie stats | Anthony Dumont Bouchard (25 saves / 28 shots) |

| February 15 | Concordia | 4 – 5 | 2OT | Queen's | Ed Meagher Arena |
| Philippe Hudon (1) – 06:39 | | First period | | No scoring |
| Philippe Hudon (2) – pp – 04:33; Charles-Éric Légaré (2) – 05:03 | | Second period | | 05:45 – Slater Doggett (1); 16:27 – pp – Jaden Lindo (1) |
| Philippe Sanche (1) – 07:23 | | Third period | | 00:19 – Spencer Abraham (2); 01:46 – Liam Dunda (1) |
| No scoring | | Second overtime period | | 01:18 – Liam Dunda (2) |
| Anthony Dumont Bouchard (42 saves / 47 shots) | | Goalie stats | | Justin Fazio (37 saves / 41 shots) |

| Queen's wins series 2 – 0 |

=== West Division ===
==== (W1) Ryerson vs. (W8) Toronto ====
| February 14 | Ryerson | 3 – 2 | OT | Toronto | Mattamy Athletic Centre |
| No scoring | | First period | | Kevin Lavoie (1) – 16:08 |
| 08:03 – Matt Mistele (1) | | Second period | | No scoring |
| 11:35 – Hayden McCool (1) | | Third period | | Max Lindsay (1) – 11:02 |
| 05:39 – Matt Mistele (2) | | First overtime period | | No scoring |
| Taylor Dupuis (33 saves / 35 shots) | | Goalie stats | | Alex Bishop (35 saves / 38 shots) |

| February 16 | Toronto | 3 – 4 | Ryerson | Varsity Arena |
| Aidan Wallace (1) – 06:09 | | First period | 17:20 – Marcus Hinds (1) |
| David Thomson (1) – 01:44 | | Second period | No scoring |
| Evan MacEachern (1) – pp – 19:26 | | Third period | 00:53 – Matt Mistele (3); 08:37 – Mathew Santos (1); 18:56 – en – Hayden McCool (2) |
| Alex Bishop (25 saves / 28 shots) | | Goalie stats | Taylor Dupuis (38 saves / 41 shots) |

| Ryerson wins series 2 – 0 |

==== (W2) Brock vs. (W7) York ====
| February 13 | Brock | 2 – 1 | York | Seymour-Hannah Centre |
| 07:12 – Jared Marino (1) | | First period | No scoring |
| 08:54 – Tyler Rollo (1) | | Second period | Justin Maiolino (1) – 07:05 |
| No scoring | | Third period | No scoring |
| Logan Thompson (33 saves / 34 shots) | | Goalie stats | Alex Fotinos (28 saves / 30 shots) |

| February 15 | York | 2 – 3 | 2OT | Brock | Canlan Ice Sports – York |
| Sal Filice (1) – pp – 16:13; Stefano Pezzetta (1) – 19:35 | | First period | | No scoring |
| No scoring | | Second period | | 06:38 – Ethan Spaxman (1) |
| No scoring | | Third period | | 05:39 – Ethan Spaxman (2) |
| No scoring | | Second overtime period | | 00:15 – Justin Brack (1) |
| Mack Shields (46 saves / 49 shots) | | Goalie stats | | Logan Thompson (35 saves / 37 shots) |

| Brock wins series 2 – 0 |

==== (W3) Western Ontario vs. (W6) Wilfrid Laurier ====
| February 14 | Western Ontario | 3 – 2 | OT | Wilfrid Laurier | Thompson Recreation and Athletic Centre |
| No scoring | | First period | | No scoring |
| No scoring | | Second period | | No scoring |
| 06:13 – Trevor Warnaar (1); 13:34 – Ray Huether (1) | | Third period | | Anthony Conti (1) – pp – 09:15; Kalob Witzell (1) – 18:41 |
| 03:18 – pp – Spenser Cobbold (1) | | First overtime period | | No scoring |
| Lucas Peressini (25 saves / 27 shots) | | Goalie stats | | Olivier Lafrenière (22 saves / 25 shots) |

| February 14 | Wilfrid Laurier | 2 – 3 | Western Ontario | Waterloo Memorial Recreation Complex |
| No scoring | | First period | 11:56 – Rylan Bechtel (1) |
| Will Cook (1) – pp – 19:21; Ethan Wiseman (1) – pp – 19:47 | | Second period | 04:36 – Ethan Szypula (1); 17:52 – Kolten Olynek (1) |
| No scoring | | Third period | No scoring |
| Olivier Lafrenière (35 saves / 38 shots) | | Goalie stats | Lucas Peressini (37 saves / 39 shots) |

| Western Ontario wins series 2 – 0 |

==== (W4) Guelph vs. (W5) Windsor ====
| February 14 | Guelph | 5 – 4 | OT | Windsor | Gryphon Centre |
| No scoring | | First period | | Connor Logan (1) – 03:33; Kyle Hope (1) |
| 06:32 – Todd Winder (1); 10:17 – pp – Marc Stevens (1); 11:19 – Todd Winder (2) | | Second period | | John Wesley (1) – 09:18 |
| 18:20 – Reilly O'Connor (1) | | Third period | | Kyle Hope (2) – 01:14 |
| 09:00 – Todd Winder (3) | | First overtime period | | No scoring |
| Andrew Masters (31 saves / 35 shots) | | Goalie stats | | Jonathan Reinhart (38 saves / 43 shots) |

| February 16 | Windsor | 0 – 4 | Guelph | Capri Pizzeria Recreation Complex |
| No scoring | | First period | 00:21 – Todd Winder (4); 08:45 – Ryan Valentini (1) |
| No scoring | | Second period | 08:55 – sh – Andres Kopstals (1) |
| No scoring | | Third period | 09:46 – Mikkel Aagaard (1) |
| Jonathan Reinhart (21 saves / 25 shots) | | Goalie stats | Andrew Masters (15 saves / 15 shots) |

| Guelph wins series 2 – 0 |

=== East Division ===
==== (E1) Ottawa vs. (E4) Queen's ====
| February 20 | Ottawa | 2 – 3 | Queen's | Minto Sports Complex Fitness Centre |
| No scoring | | First period | Henry Thompson (1) – 05:36 |
| 02:44 – Cody Van Lierop (1); 05:47 –– Marc Beckstead (2) | | Second period | Mason Kohn (1) – pp – 06:51 |
| No scoring | | Third period | Mason Kohn (2) – 03:45 |
| Anthony Brodeur (24 saves / 27 shots) | | Goalie stats | Justin Fazio (34 saves / 36 shots) |

| February 22 | Queen's | 2 – 5 | Ottawa | Kingston Memorial Centre |
| No scoring | | First period | 08:03 – Jean-François Plante (1) |
| Spencer Abraham (3) – pp – 19:05 | | Second period | 12:38 – Brendan Jacome (1); 15:24 – Cody Van Lierop (2) |
| Alex Row (1) – 12:11 | | Third period | 10:12 – Marco Azzano (1); 11:57 – Connor Sills (1) |
| Justin Fazio (41 saves / 46 shots) | | Goalie stats | Graham Hunt (24 saves / 26 shots) |

| February 24 | Ottawa | 5 – 6 | Queen's | Minto Sports Complex Fitness Centre |
| No scoring | | First period | 07:21 – Slater Doggett (2); 14:46 – Jared Bethune (1); 15:54 – Slater Doggett (3) |
| Brendan Jacome (2) – 15:17; Eric Locke (3) – pp – 19:14 | | Second period | No scoring |
| Eric Locke (4) – 01:00; Michael Poirier (2) – 09:46; Jacob Sweeney (1) – 11:16 | | Third period | 08:36 – Mason Kohn (3); 10:08 – Jared Bethune (2); 10:59 – pp – Jared Bethune (3) |
| Graham Hunt (7 saves / 10 shots); Anthony Brodeur (17 saves / 20 shots) | | Goalie stats | Justin Fazio (33 saves / 38 shots) |

| Queen's wins series 2 – 1 |

==== (E2) Carleton vs. (E3) McGill ====
| February 21 | Carleton | 1 – 3 | McGill | Advanced Capital Ice House |
| No scoring | | First period | Nicolas Poulin (1) – 07:56; Keanu Yamamoto (3) – 09:15 |
| No scoring | | Second period | No scoring |
| 07:20 – pp – Brogan O'Brien (1) | | Third period | Michael Cramarossa (2) – 14:36 |
| François Brassard (32 saves / 35 shots) | | Goalie stats | Louis-Philip Guindon (36 saves / 37 shots) |

| February 23 | McGill | 3 – 5 | Carleton | Arèna McConnell |
| Nikolas Brouillard (1) – pp – 14:54; Antoine Dufort-Plante (2) – pp – 17:49; Keanu Yamamoto (4) – pp – 19:03 | | First period | 05:50 – pp – Matthew Forchuk (3); 06:07 – Evan de Haan (1); 09:38 – Brett Gustavsen (1); 11:57 – Matthew Forchuk (4) |
| No scoring | | Second period | No scoring |
| No scoring | | Third period | 12:40 – Jared Steege (3) |
| Louis-Philip Guindon (24 saves / 29 shots) | | Goalie stats | François Brassard (27 saves / 30 shots) |

| February 24 | Carleton | 4 – 3 | OT | McGill | Advanced Capital Ice House |
| Josh Burnside (2) – 17:26 | | First period | | 16:47 – Jérôme Verrier (1) |
| Evan de Haan (2) – pp – 02:29; Hayden Hulton (1) – 08:08 | | Second period | | No scoring |
| No scoring | | Third period | | 03:05 – Jordan-Ty Fournier (3); 07:19 – Guillaume Gauthier (1) |
| Jared Steege (4) – 06:41 | | First overtime period | | No scoring |
| François Brassard (35 saves / 38 shots) | | Goalie stats | | Louis-Philip Guindon (27 saves / 31 shots) |

| Carleton wins series 2 – 1 |

=== West Division ===
==== (W1) Ryerson vs. (W4) Guelph ====
| February 21 | Ryerson | 1 – 4 | Guelph | Mattamy Athletic Centre |
| No scoring | | First period | Mikkel Aagaard (2) – 17:32 |
| No scoring | | Second period | No scoring |
| 15:59 – Steven Harland (1) | | Third period | Todd Winder (4) – pp – 00:48; Ryan Valentini (2) – 16:25; Mikkel Aagaard (3) – en – 19:55 |
| Taylor Dupuis (28 saves / 31 shots) | | Goalie stats | Andrew Masters (23 saves / 24 shots) |

| February 23 | Guelph | 5 – 6 | OT | Ryerson | Gryphon Centre |
| Stephen Templeton (1) – 03:03 | | First period | | 05:06 – Patrick Fellows (1) |
| Seth Swenson (1) – 11:23; Todd Winder (5) – 19:24 | | Second period | | 01:38 – pp – Matt Mistele (4); 09:10 – pp – Devon Paliani (1) |
| Ryan Valentini (2) – 14:31; Connor Bramwell (1) – 19:14 | | Third period | | 11:42 – Jesse Barwell (1); 13:56 – Jesse Barwell (2) |
| No scoring | | First overtime period | | 06:46 – Matt Mistele (5) |
| Andrew Masters (35 saves / 41 shots) | | Goalie stats | | Taylor Dupuis (22 saves / 27 shots) |

| February 24 | Ryerson | 3 – 4 | Guelph | Mattamy Athletic Centre |
| Mathew Santos (2) – 13:08 | | First period | No scoring |
| Patrick Fellows (2) – 11:36; Matt Mistele (6) – pp – 15:29 | | Second period | 04:17 – Scott Simmonds (1); 07:32 – pp – Scott Simmonds (2); 09:50 – Ryan Valentini (3); 10:15 – Nick Boyer (1) |
| No scoring | | Third period | No scoring |
| Taylor Dupuis (29 saves / 33 shots) | | Goalie stats | Andrew Masters (24 saves / 27 shots) |

| Guelph wins series 2 – 1 |

==== (W2) Brock vs. (W3) Western Ontario ====
| February 20 | Brock | 2 – 3 | Western Ontario | Seymour-Hannah Centre |
| No scoring | | First period | Spenser Cobbold (2) – 03:31 |
| 01:11 – Tyler Rollo (2); 07:00 – Connor Brown (1) | | Second period | No scoring |
| No scoring | | Third period | Kyle Petit (1) – pp – 13:31; Cordell James (1) – 15:21 |
| Logan Thompson (24 saves / 27 shots) | | Goalie stats | Lucas Peressini (29 saves / 31 shots) |

| February 22 | Western Ontario | 2 – 3 | Brock | Thompson Recreation and Athletic Centre |
| Ray Huether (1) – 06:43 | | First period | 12:12 – pp – Ethan Spaxman (3) |
| No scoring | | Second period | 13:02 – pp – Frank Pucci (1) |
| Ray Huether (2) – 03:34 | | Third period | 13:58 – Skylar Pacheco (1) |
| Lucas Peressini (24 saves / 27 shots) | | Goalie stats | Logan Thompson (42 saves / 44 shots) |

| February 24 | Brock | 1 – 7 | Western Ontario | Seymour-Hannah Centre |
| No scoring | | First period | 08:24 – pp – Trevor Warnaar (2) |
| No scoring | | Second period | 02:57 – Kolten Olynek (2); 15:55 – pp – Kyle Petit (2); 17:31 – Ethan Szypula (2) |
| Jared Marino (2) – 14:41 | | Third period | 05:32 – pp – Anthony Stefano (1); 12:49 – Cordell James (2); 14:02 – Kenny Huether (1) |
| Logan Thompson (27 saves / 34 shots) | | Goalie stats | Lucas Peressini (31 saves / 32 shots) |

| Western Ontario wins series 2 – 1 |

=== East Division ===
==== (E2) Carleton vs. (E4) Queen's ====
| February 28 | Carleton | 2 – 3 | OT | Queen's | Advanced Capital Ice House |
| No scoring | | First period | | Jaden Lindo (3) – 17:15 |
| No scoring | | Second period | | No scoring |
| 00:55 – Dalen Hedges (3); 19:19 – Matthew Forchuk (5) | | Third period | | Duncan Campbell (1) – 06:58 |
| No scoring | | First overtime period | | Jaden Lindo (4) – 00:57 |
| François Brassard (24 saves / 27 shots) | | Goalie stats | | Justin Fazio (42 saves / 44 shots) |

| March 2 | Queen's | 4 – 1 | Carleton | Kingston Memorial Centre |
| Luke Edwards (1) – 14:53; Spencer Abraham (4) – 19:02 | | First period | No scoring |
| No scoring | | Second period | 07:06 – Aaron Boyd (1) |
| Jared Bethune (4) – 16:56; Duncan Campbell (2) – en – 17:48 | | Third period | No scoring |
| Justin Fazio (50 saves / 51 shots) | | Goalie stats | François Brassard (20 saves / 23 shots) |

| Queen's wins series 2 – 0 |

=== West Division ===
==== (W3) Western Ontario vs. (W4) Guelph ====
| February 28 | Western Ontario | 4 – 3 | Guelph | Thompson Recreation and Athletic Centre |
| No scoring | | First period | No scoring |
| 11:19 – Mitchell Fitzmorris (1); 12:48 – Cordell James (3); 19:15 – Mitch Brooks (1) | | Second period | Justin Lemcke (1) – pp – 06:12; Andres Kopstals (2) – 11:57; Mikkel Aagaard (4) – pp – 18:57 |
| 14:37 – Kyle Petit (3) | | Third period | No scoring |
| Lucas Peressini (32 saves / 35 shots) | | Goalie stats | Andrew Masters (26 saves / 30 shots) |

| March 2 | Guelph | 6 – 1 | Western Ontario | Gryphon Centre |
| Mikkel Aagaard (5) – 13:04 | | First period | No scoring |
| Tryg Strand (1) – 14:09; Ryan Valentini (4) – 16:56 | | Second period | No scoring |
| Connor Bramwell (2) – 04:46; Mikkel Aagaard (6) – 04:56; Marc Stevens (2) – pp – 13:51 | | Third period | 08:53 – pp – Stephen Desrocher (1) |
| Andrew Masters (17 saves / 18 shots) | | Goalie stats | Lucas Peressini (22 saves / 27 shots); David Ovsjannikov (2 saves / 3 shots) |

| March 3 | Western Ontario | 3 – 4 | 2OT | Guelph | Thompson Recreation and Athletic Centre |
| No scoring | | First period | | 16:21 – Scott Simmonds (2) |
| Rylan Bechtel (2) – pp – 02:39; Cordell James (4) – 04:43 | | Second period | | No scoring |
| Stephen Desroche (2) – 18:20 | | Third period | | 01:25 – Jesse Saban (1); 01:58 – Mikkel Aagaard (7) |
| No scoring | | Second overtime period | | 14:44 – Mikkel Aagaard (8) |
| Lucas Peressini (39 saves / 43 shots) | | Goalie stats | | Andrew Masters (44 saves / 47 shots) |

| Guelph wins series 2 – 1 |

=== Queen's Cup Final ===
==== (E4) Queen's vs. (W4) Guelph ====
| March 9 | Queen's | 4 – 1 | Guelph | Kingston Memorial Centre |
| No scoring | | First period | No scoring |
| 00:22 – pp – Jaden Lindo (4) | | Second period | Marc Stevens (3) – 19:35 |
| 04:42 – Jaden Lindo (5); 07:52 – Henry Thompson (2); 19:05 – en – Liam Dunda (3) | | Third period | No scoring |
| Justin Fazio (31 saves / 32 shots) | | Goalie stats | Andrew Masters (22 saves / 25 shots) |

=== Bronze Medal Game ===
==== (E2) Carleton vs. (W3) Western Ontario ====
| March 8 | Carleton | 3 – 0 | Western Ontario | Advanced Capital Ice House |
| 11:03 – Dalen Hedges (4) | | First period | No scoring |
| 11:40 – Jared Steege (5) | | Second period | No scoring |
| 18:05 – en – Jake Smith (1) | | Third period | No scoring |
| François Brassard (40 saves / 40 shots) | | Goalie stats | Lucas Peressini (28 saves / 30 shots) |

== 2020 ==
| East | | | West | | |
| Seed | School | Standings | Seed | School | Standings |
|---|---|---|---|---|---|
| 1 | Carleton | 24–3–1–0 | 1 | Toronto | 21–5–2–0 |
| 2 | Quebec–Trois-Rivières | 19–6–1–2 | 2 | Ryerson | 20–5–2–1 |
| 3 | Ottawa | 17–7–2–2 | 3 | Guelph | 17–6–4–1 |
| 4 | McGill | 16–10–2–0 | 4 | Windsor | 15–10–0–3 |
| 5 | Concordia | 13–10–5–0 | 5 | Brock | 14–12–2–0 |
| 6 | Ontario Tech | 13–12–3–0 | T–6 | Wilfrid Laurier | 13–12–2–1 |
| 7 | Queen's | 12–13–1–2 | T–6 | Lakehead | 13–12–3–0 |
| T–8 | Royal Military College | 9–18–1–0 | 8 | Western Ontario | 11–13–4–0 |
| T–8 | Nipissing | 8–17–1–2 | 9 | Waterloo | 11–15–2–0 |
| 10 | Laurentian | 5–21–1–1 | 10 | York | 9–17–2–0 |

Note: Windsor was required to forfeit two games during the season for using an ineligible player.

Division Quarterfinals; February 12–16
E1 | Carleton | 7 | 5 | -
E8 | Royal Military College | 3 | 4 | -
E2 | Quebec–Trois-Rivières | 3 | 4 | -
E7 | Queen's | 1 | 3 | -
East
E3 | Ottawa | 3 | 3 | 5
E6 | Ontario Tech | 1 | 5 | 0
E4 | McGill | 2 | 4 | 1
E5 | Concordia | 1 | 5* | 2
W1 | Toronto | 6 | 1 | 1
W8 | Western Ontario | 2 | 3 | 3
W2 | Ryerson | 4 | 2* | -
W7 | Lakehead | 1 | 1 | -
West
W3 | Guelph | 1 | 6 | 4
W6 | Wilfrid Laurier | 3 | 3 | 2
W4 | Windsor | 3 | 4 | -
W5 | Brock | 6 | 5 | -

Division Semifinals; February 19–23
E1 | Carleton | 3 | 1 | -
E4 | Concordia | 4*** | 3 | -
E2 | Quebec–Trois-Rivières | 2 | 3 | 2
E3 | Ottawa | 1 | 5 | 4
W2 | Ryerson | 4 | 2 | 2
W8 | Western Ontario | 1 | 5 | 4*
W3 | Guelph | 3 | 2* | -
W5 | Brock | 2 | 1 | -

Division Finals; February 27–March 1
E4 | Concordia | 1 | 2 | -
E3 | Ottawa | 3 | 7 | -
W8 | Western Ontario | 1 | 4 | 3
W3 | Guelph | 2* | 3 | 4

Queen's Cup Final; March 7
E3 | Ottawa | 1
W3 | Guelph | 2***
Bronze Medal Game
E4 | Concordia | 2
W8 | Western Ontario | 5

Note: * denotes overtime period(s)

== 2021 ==
Season cancelled due to COVID-19 pandemic

== 2022 ==
| Far East | | | East | | | West | | | Far West | | |
| Seed | School | Standings | Seed | School | Standings | Seed | School | Standings | Seed | School | Standings |
|---|---|---|---|---|---|---|---|---|---|---|---|
| 1 | Quebec–Trois-Rivières | 10–3–1–1 | 1 | Queen's | 17–1–0–1 | 1 | Ryerson | 11–4–0–0 | 1 | Windsor | 12–3–1–0 |
| 2 | Concordia | 9–5–0–1 | 2 | Nipissing | 10–7–0–1 | 2 | Toronto | 9–6–2–0 | 2 | Wilfrid Laurier | 8–7–1–0 |
| 3 | Ottawa | 9–8–1–0 | 3 | Ontario Tech | 8–8–0–1 | 3 | Brock | 7–5–2–0 | T–3 | Western Ontario | 7–7–0–0 |
| 4 | Carleton | 4–4–2–1 | 4 | Royal Military College | 2–15–3–0 | 4 | York | 6–8–2–0 | T–3 | Waterloo | 8–8–0–0 |
| 5 | McGill | 6–11–0–0 | | | | 5 | Lakehead | 6–9–0–1 | 5 | Guelph | 4–9–1–2 |

Note: Due to unbalanced schedules, the teams were sorted based upon winning percentage rather than points.
Note: Guelph was required to forfeit three games due to violating OUA rules governing team composition.

Division Quarterfinals; March 16–17 | Division Semifinals; March 19
E1 | Queen's | 2
E8 | McGill | 3*
E8 | McGill | 3
E4 | Nipissing | 1
E4 | Nipissing | 4
E5 | Ottawa | 0
East
E2 | Quebec–Trois-Rivières | 6
E7 | Carleton | 1
E2 | Quebec–Trois-Rivières | 6
E6 | Ontario Tech | 3
E3 | Concordia | 4
E6 | Ontario Tech | 6
W1 | Windsor | 2
W8 | York | 4
W8 | York | 2
W4 | Brock | 8
W4 | Brock | 5
W5 | Wilfrid Laurier | 2
West
W2 | Ryerson | 5**
W7 | Western Ontario | 4
W2 | Ryerson | 4*
W6 | Waterloo | 3
W3 | Toronto | 1
W6 | Waterloo | 4

Division Finals; March 23
E8 | McGill | 0
E2 | Quebec–Trois-Rivières | 1
W4 | Brock | 5
W2 | Ryerson | 2

Queen's Cup Final; March 26
E2 | Quebec–Trois-Rivières | 3
W4 | Brock | 1
Bronze Medal Game
E8 | McGill | 1
W2 | Ryerson | 2

Note: * denotes overtime period(s)

=== East Division ===
==== (E1) Queen's vs. (E8) McGill ====
| March 16 | Queen's | 2 – 3 | OT | McGill | Kingston Memorial Centre |
| 08:13 – Jack Duff (1) | | First period | | No scoring |
| 02:40 – Jonathan Yantsis (1) | | Second period | | No scoring |
| No scoring | | Third period | | Brandon Skubel (1) – 05:53; Eric Uba (1) – 17:54 |
| No scoring | | First overtime period | | William Poirier (1) – 13:36 |
| Luke Richardson (40 saves / 43 shots) | | Goalie stats | | Emanuel Vella (47 saves / 49 shots) |

==== (E4) Nipissing vs. (E5) Ottawa ====
| March 16 | Nipissing | 4 – 0 | Ottawa | Boart Longyear Memorial Gardens |
| 03:58 – Gaël-Mukeba Lubwele (1); 08:46 – Harrison Caines (1) | | First period | No scoring |
| No scoring | | Second period | No scoring |
| 06:21 – Brock Welsh (1); 17:51 – Colby Tower (1) | | Third period | No scoring |
| Michael Herringer (28 saves / 28 shots) | | Goalie stats | Anand Oberoi (19 saves / 22 shots) |

==== (E2) Quebec–Trois-Rivières vs. (E7) Carleton ====
| March 16 | Quebec–Trois-Rivières | 6 – 1 | Carleton | Colisée Jean-Guy Talbot |
| 06:00 – Simon Lafrance (1); 09:27 – Louis-Filip Côté (1); 10:05 – Samuel L'Italien (1) | | First period | No scoring |
| No scoring | | Second period | Conner Jean (1) – 09:01 |
| 03:32 – Zachary Lavigne (1); 07:56 – Jordan Martel (1); 14:07 – Simon Lafrance (2) | | Third period | No scoring |
| Alexis Gravel (26 saves / 27 shots) | | Goalie stats | Mark Grametbauer (30 saves / 36 shots) |

==== (E3) Concordia vs. (E6) Ontario Tech ====
| March 16 | Concordia | 4 – 6 | Ontario Tech | Ed Meagher Arena |
| 03:55 – Maxim Trépanier (1); 09:42 – Jeffrey Durocher (1) | | First period | Nicolas Tardif (1) – 08:25; Jack Patterson (1) – 13:39; Sean Ross (1) – 16:53 |
| 01:00 – pp – Phélix Martineau (1) | | Second period | Jack Patterson (2) – pp — 06:23 |
| 17:34 – Alexandre Katerinakis (1) | | Third period | Andrew Suriyuth (1) – 17:12; Jack Patterson (3) – pp – en – 19:50 |
| Jacob Delorme (27 saves / 32 shots) | | Goalie stats | Leif Hertz (25 saves / 29 shots) |

=== West Division ===
==== (W1) Windsor vs. (W8) York ====
| March 16 | Windsor | 2 – 4 | York | Capri Pizzeria Recreation Complex |
| No scoring | | First period | Braydon Buziak (1) – 16:01 |
| 9:33 – Ryan Barbosa (1) | | Second period | Lucas Breault (1) – 7:34 |
| 0:08 – pp – Sean Olson (1) | | Third period | Benjamin Evanish (1) – 5:37; Brock McLeod (1) – en – 18:15 |
| Nathan Torchia (40 saves / 43 shots) | | Goalie stats | Cole Ceci (37 saves / 39 shots) |

==== (W4) Brock vs. (W5) Wilfrid Laurier ====
| March 16 | Wilfrid Laurier | 2 – 5 | Brock | Waterloo Memorial Recreation Complex |
| No scoring | | First period | 11:37 – Kyle Robinson (1) |
| Grayden Gottschalk (1) – 03:02 | | Second period | 03:51 – Cole Thiessen (1) |
| Chayse Herrfort (1) – 08:03 | | Third period | 17:35 – pp – Jared Marino (1); 18:35 – en – Christian Girhiny (1); 19:52 – en – Jared Marino (2) |
| Christian Propp (35 saves / 38 shots) | | Goalie stats | Mario Peccia (30 saves / 32 shots) |

==== (W2) Ryerson vs. (W7) Western Ontario ====
| March 16 | Ryerson | 5 – 4 | 2OT | Western Ontario | Mattamy Athletic Centre |
| No scoring | | First period | | Shane Bulitka (1) – 00:20; Riley MacRae (1) – 02:31; Jake Gravelle (1) – 10:10 |
| 01:43 – Hayden McCool (1) | | Second period | | No scoring |
| 13:30 – Jacob Kamps (1); 17:59 – pp – David Miller (1); 18:33 – Ryan Wells (1) | | Third period | | Riley MacRae (2) – 15:10 |
| 00:27 – Elijah Roberts (1) | | Second overtime period | | No scoring |
| Garrett Forrest (31 saves / 35 shots) | | Goalie stats | | Dylan Myskiw (38 saves / 43 shots) |

==== (W3) Toronto vs. (W6) Waterloo ====
| March 16 | Toronto | 1 – 4 | Waterloo | Varsity Arena |
| 06:09 – Cole Purboo (1) | | First period | No scoring |
| No scoring | | Second period | Nolan Lee (1) – 12:39; Chase Campbell (1) – 13:55 |
| No scoring | | Third period | Gavin Wood (1) – 01:30; Jacob Cascagnette (1) – en – 18:40 |
| Alex Bishop (12 saves / 15 shots) | | Goalie stats | Dan Murphy (42 saves / 43 shots) |

=== East Division ===
==== (E4) Queen's vs. (E8) McGill ====
| March 19 | Nipissing | 1 – 3 | McGill | Boart Longyear Memorial Gardens |
| No scoring | | First period | Scott Walford (1) – pp – 05:49 |
| No scoring | | Second period | Brandon Frattaroli (1) – pp – 05:35; Jordan-Ty Fournier (1) – 12:26 |
| 08:41 – Jacob Collins (1) | | Third period | No scoring |
| Michael Herringer (33 saves / 36 shots) | | Goalie stats | Emanuel Vella (32 saves / 33 shots) |

==== (E2) Quebec–Trois-Rivières vs. (E6) Ontario Tech ====
| March 19 | Quebec–Trois-Rivières | 6 – 3 | Ontario Tech | Colisée Jean-Guy Talbot |
| 03:50 – Félix-Antoine Marcotty (1); 11:42 – pp – Mathieu Boucher (1) | | First period | No scoring |
| 07:41 – Mathieu Boucher (2); 11:47 – Louis-Filip Côté (2); 17:39 – sh – Zachary Lavigne (2) | | Second period | No scoring |
| 05:19 – Simon Lafrance (3) | | Third period | Andrew Suriyuth (2) – 03:10; Jack Patterson (4) – 08:42; Matthew Barron (1) – 12:55 |
| Alexis Gravel (27 saves / 30 shots) | | Goalie stats | Leif Hertz (27 saves / 33 shots); Christian Mattiace (1 save / 1 shot) |

=== West Division ===
==== (W4) Brock vs. (W8) York ====
| March 19 | Brock | 8 – 2 | York | Algoma Central Arena |
| 02:16 – Ryan Burton (1); 04:00 – Kyle Robinson (2); 04:16 – Justin Brack (1); 09:42 – pp – Tyler Burnie (1); 17:57 – Justin Brack (2) | | First period | No scoring |
| 01:38 – Adam Berg (1); 17:50 – pp – Owen Guy (1) | | Second period | Brock McLeod (2) – 07:46 |
| 16:42 – pp – Tyler Burnie (2) | | Third period | Lucas Theriault (1) – 19:12 |
| Mario Peccia (27 saves / 29 shots) | | Goalie stats | Cole Ceci (6 saves / 10 shots); Dalton Ewing (29 saves / 33 shots) |

==== (W2) Ryerson vs. (W6) Waterloo ====
| March 19 | Ryerson | 4 – 3 | OT | Waterloo | Mattamy Athletic Centre |
| 10:23 – Kevin Gursoy (1) | | First period | | Tate Popple (1) – 07:49 |
| No scoring | | Second period | | Dan Walker (1) – pp – 07:28; Connor Lovie (1) – pp – 14:08 |
| 12:00 – Kyle Bollers (1); 16:33 - Chris Playfair (1) | | Third period | | No scoring |
| 05:12 – Joseph Rupoli (1) | | First overtime period | | No scoring |
| Garrett Forrest (31 saves / 34 shots) | | Goalie stats | | Dan Murphy (39 saves / 43 shots) |

=== East Division ===
==== (E2) Quebec–Trois-Rivières vs. (E8) McGill ====
| March 23 | Quebec–Trois-Rivières | 1 – 0 | McGill | Colisée Jean-Guy Talbot |
| 00:24 – Maxime Chagnon (1) | | First period | No scoring |
| No scoring | | Second period | No scoring |
| No scoring | | Third period | No scoring |
| Alexis Gravel (16 saves / 16 shots) | | Goalie stats | Emanuel Vella (33 saves / 34 shots) |

=== West Division ===
==== (W2) Ryerson vs. (W4) Brock ====
| March 23 | Ryerson | 2 – 5 | Brock | Mattamy Athletic Centre |
| 14:20 – pp – Elijah Roberts (2) | | First period | Jared Marino (3) – 11:05 |
| 08:03 – Domenico Commisso (1) | | Second period | Jacob Roach (1) – 07:19; Zach Taylor (1) – pp – 18:54 |
| No scoring | | Third period | Jacob Roach (2) – 03:13; Justin Brack (3) – en – 17:56 |
| Garrett Forrest (31 saves / 35 shots) | | Goalie stats | Mario Peccia (29 saves / 31 shots) |

=== Queen's Cup Final ===
==== (E2) Quebec–Trois-Rivières vs. (W4) Brock ====
| March 26 | Quebec–Trois-Rivières | 3 – 1 | Brock | Algoma Central Arena |
| 03:24 – Félix Boivin (1); 19:10 – pp – Simon Lafrance (4) | | First period | No scoring |
| 11:01 – pp – Simon Lafrance (5) | | Second period | No scoring |
| No scoring | | Third period | Cole Thiessen (2) – pp – 02:23 |
| Alexis Gravel (32 saves / 33 shots) | | Goalie stats | Mario Peccia (31 saves / 34 shots) |

=== Bronze Medal Game ===
==== (W2) Ryerson vs. (E8) McGill ====
| March 26 | Ryerson | 2 – 1 | McGill | Mattamy Athletic Centre |
| 12:08 – pp – Jeremiah Addison (1) | | First period | No scoring |
| 17:42 – pp – Kevin Gursoy (2) | | Second period | No scoring |
| No scoring | | Third period | Brandon Frattaroli (2) – 18:04 |
| Garrett Forrest (33 saves / 34 shots) | | Goalie stats | Emanuel Vella (21 saves / 23 shots) |

== 2023 ==
| East | | | West | | |
| Seed | School | Standings | Seed | School | Standings |
|---|---|---|---|---|---|
| 1 | Quebec–Trois-Rivières | 21–4–1–0 | T–1 | Lakehead | 18–6–2–1 |
| 2 | Concordia | 19–7–0–0 | T–1 | Windsor | 18–6–3–0 |
| 3 | McGill | 14–8–3–1 | 3 | Brock | 17–9–0–1 |
| 4 | Carleton | 14–9–2–1 | 4 | Toronto Metropolitan | 16–9–2–0 |
| 5 | Ontario Tech | 13–10–3–0 | 5 | Toronto | 14–10–3–0 |
| 6 | Ottawa | 13–11–2–0 | T–6 | Wilfrid Laurier | 13–13–1–0 |
| 7 | Queen's | 12–12–2–0 | T–6 | Western Ontario | 11–11–5–0 |
| 8 | Royal Military College | 7–17–1–1 | T–6 | Guelph | 10–10–7–0 |
| 9 | Nipissing | 4–17–4–1 | 9 | York | 12–13–2–0 |
| | | | 10 | Waterloo | 6–18–1–2 |

Division Quarterfinals; February 15–19
E3 | McGill | 4 | 8 | -
E6 | Ottawa | 2 | 2 | -
E4 | Ontario Tech | 0 | 0 | -
E5 | Carleton | 4 | 4 | -

Division Semifinals; February 22–25
E1 | Quebec–Trois-Rivières | 3 | 6 | -
E5 | Carleton | 1 | 3 | -
East
E2 | Concordia | 6 | 4 | -
E3 | McGill | 3 | 0 | -

Division Finals; March 1–5
E1 | Quebec–Trois-Rivières | 1 | 5 | 5*
E2 | Concordia | 5 | 3 | 4
Queen's Cup Final; March 11
E1 | Lakehead | 0
W2 | Windsor | 4

Note: * denotes overtime period(s)

== 2024 ==
| East | | | West | | |
| Seed | School | Standings | Seed | School | Standings |
|---|---|---|---|---|---|
| 1 | McGill | 21–5–1–1 | 1 | Brock | 21–7–0–0 |
| 2 | Quebec–Trois-Rivières | 21–6–0–1 | 2 | Toronto Metropolitan | 19–8–1–0 |
| 3 | Ottawa | 20–6–2–0 | 3 | Toronto | 17–10–1–0 |
| 4 | Queen's | 19–8–1–0 | 4 | Windsor | 15–11–1–1 |
| 5 | Concordia | 17–8–3–0 | 5 | Lakehead | 14–12–2–0 |
| 6 | Ontario Tech | 14–10–3–1 | 6 | Wilfrid Laurier | 13–13–1–1 |
| 7 | Carleton | 10–13–4–1 | 7 | Nipissing | 10–13–2–3 |
| 8 | Royal Military College | 7–19–0–2 | 8 | Guelph | 11–16–1–0 |
| 9 | York | 3–22–2–1 | 9 | Western Ontario | 10–18–0–0 |
| | | | 10 | Waterloo | 4–19–4–1 |

Play In; February 11
W6 | Wilfrid Laurier | 5*
W7 | Nipissing | 4

Division Quarterfinals; February 14–17
W4 | Windsor | 3* | 7 | -
W5 | Lakehead | 2 | 2 | -
W3 | Toronto | 4 | 3 | -
W6 | Wilfrid Laurier | 7 | 5 | -
E4 | Queen's | 1 | 3 | -
E5 | Concordia | 3 | 4* | -
E3 | Ottawa | 5 | 8 | -
E6 | Ontario Tech | 1 | 0 | -

Division Semifinals; February 21–25
W1 | Brock | 6 | 4 | -
W4 | Windsor | 1 | 1 | -
West
W2 | Toronto Metropolitan | 4 | 5 | -
W6 | Wilfrid Laurier | 1 | 1 | -
E1 | McGill | 6 | 3 | -
E5 | Concordia | 4 | 1 | -
East
E2 | Quebec–Trois-Rivières | 4 | 2 | 1
E3 | Ottawa | 1 | 3* | 0

Division Finals; February 28–March 3
W1 | Brock | 3 | 1 | 1
W2 | Toronto Metropolitan | 1 | 5 | 2
E1 | McGill | 2 | 5 | 0
E2 | Quebec–Trois-Rivières | 4 | 3 | 4

Queen's Cup Final; March 9
W2 | Toronto Metropolitan | 2
E2 | Quebec–Trois-Rivières | 3**
Bronze Medal Game
W1 | Brock | 2
E1 | McGill | 5

Note: * denotes overtime period(s)

== 2025 ==
| East | | | West | | |
| Seed | School | Standings | Seed | School | Standings |
|---|---|---|---|---|---|
| 1 | Concordia | 21–3–3–1 | 1 | Toronto Metropolitan | 17–10–1–0 |
| 2 | Queen's | 22–6–0–0 | 2 | Toronto | 17–11–0–0 |
| 3 | Ottawa | 19–6–3–0 | 3 | Windsor | 16–11–1–0 |
| 4 | McGill | 18–9–0–1 | 4 | Western Ontario | 16–11–1–0 |
| 5 | Quebec–Trois-Rivières | 18–9–1–0 | 5 | Lakehead | 15–11–1–1 |
| 6 | Ontario Tech | 16–9–2–1 | 6 | Waterloo | 13–10–3–2 |
| 7 | Carleton | 12–14–2–0 | 7 | Brock | 12–11–4–1 |
| 8 | York | 7–16–2–3 | 8 | Guelph | 12–15–1–0 |
| 9 | Royal Military College | 1–25–1–1 | 9 | Nipissing | 9–17–2–0 |
| | | | 10 | Wilfrid Laurier | 5–19–4–0 |

Division Quarterfinals; February 19–23
E3 | Ottawa | 3* | 3* | -
E6 | Ontario Tech | 2 | 2 | -
E4 | McGill | 2 | 5 | -
E5 | Quebec–Trois-Rivières | 1 | 2 | -

Division Semifinals; February 26–March 1
E1 | Concordia | 1 | 5 | 5
E4 | McGill | 6 | 1 | 4
East
E2 | Queen's | 4 | 7 | -
E3 | Ottawa | 3 | 3 | -

Division Finals; March 5–9
E1 | Concordia | 2 | 1 | -
E2 | Queens | 1 | 0 | -
Queen's Cup Final; March 15
E1 | Toronto Metropolitan | 2
W1 | Toronto | 3

Note: * denotes overtime period(s)

== 2026 ==
| East | | | West | | |
| Seed | School | Standings | Seed | School | Standings |
|---|---|---|---|---|---|
| 1 | Quebec–Trois-Rivières | 20–5-3–0 | 1 | Windsor | 18–7–3–0 |
| 2 | Concordia | 20–7–1–0 | 2 | Toronto Metropolitan | 19–9–0–0 |
| 3 | McGill | 16–8–3–1 | 3 | Lakehead | 18–9–1–0 |
| 4 | Ottawa | 16–10–2–0 | 4 | Wilfrid Laurier | 15–8–4–1 |
| 5 | Ontario Tech | 14–13–1–0 | 5 | Guelph | 15–9–4–0 |
| 6 | Queen's | 14–13–1–0 | 6 | Brock | 13–11–3–1 |
| 7 | Nipissing | 12–12–4–0 | 7 | Toronto | 13–12–2–1 |
| 8 | Carleton | 11–15–2–0 | 8 | Waterloo | 12–15–0–1 |
| 9 | Royal Military College | 3–19–5–1 | 9 | Western Ontario | 11–14–3–0 |
| | | | 10 | York | 6–20–2–0 |

Round 1 February 16–22
E4 | Ottawa | 2** | 4 | -
E5 | Ontario Tech | 1 | 0 | -
E3 | McGill | 2 | 1 | -
E6 | Queen's | 6 | 2* | -

Quarterfinals; February 23–March 1
E1 | Quebec–Trois-Rivières | 4 | 5 | -
E4 | Ottawa | 1 | 1 | -
East
E2 | Concordia | 2 | 1 | -
E6 | Queen's | 3 | 2 | -

Semifinals; March 2–8
E1 | Quebec–Trois-Rivières | 3 | 2 | 3
E6 | Queen's | 5 | 1 | 1
Queen's Cup Final; March 14
W1 | Quebec–Trois-Rivières | 2**
W1 | Windsor | 1

Note: * denotes overtime period(s)

== Championships ==
| School | Championships |
|---|---|
| Quebec–Trois-Rivières | 12 |
| McGill | 5 |
| Guelph | 2 |
| Western Ontario | 2 |
| Windsor | 2 |
| York | 2 |
| Lakehead | 1 |
| Queen's | 1 |
| Concordia | 1 |

== See also ==
- QOAA men's ice hockey tournament
- OSLC men's ice hockey tournament
- OIAA men's ice hockey tournament
- OUAA men's ice hockey tournament
