= Carleton Ravens men's ice hockey =

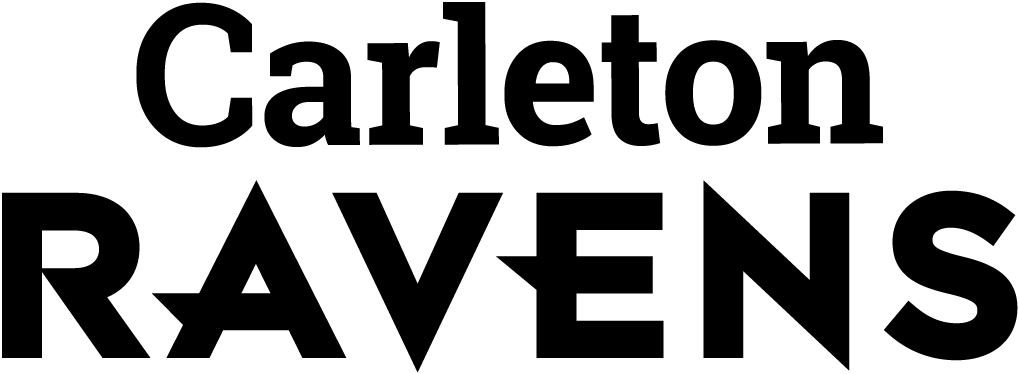
- University: Carleton University
- Conference: OUA; OUA East Division
- Head coach: Shaun Van Allen; Since 2017–18 season
- Assistant coaches: Mark Cavallin; Michael McNamee; Ryan Dube; Matthew Jenkins
- Arena: Carleton Ice House; Ottawa, Ontario
- Colors: Black, White, and Red

U Sports tournament appearances
- 2014, 2016, 2019

Conference tournament champions
- 1961

Conference regular season champions
- 1961, 2014, 2020

The Carleton Ravens men's ice hockey team is an active ice hockey program representing the Carleton Ravens athletic department of the Carleton University. The team was organized at least as far back as 1949, playing then at the intermediate level. The team was previously dormant for over 30 years, however, the program has been continually active since 2008.

== History ==
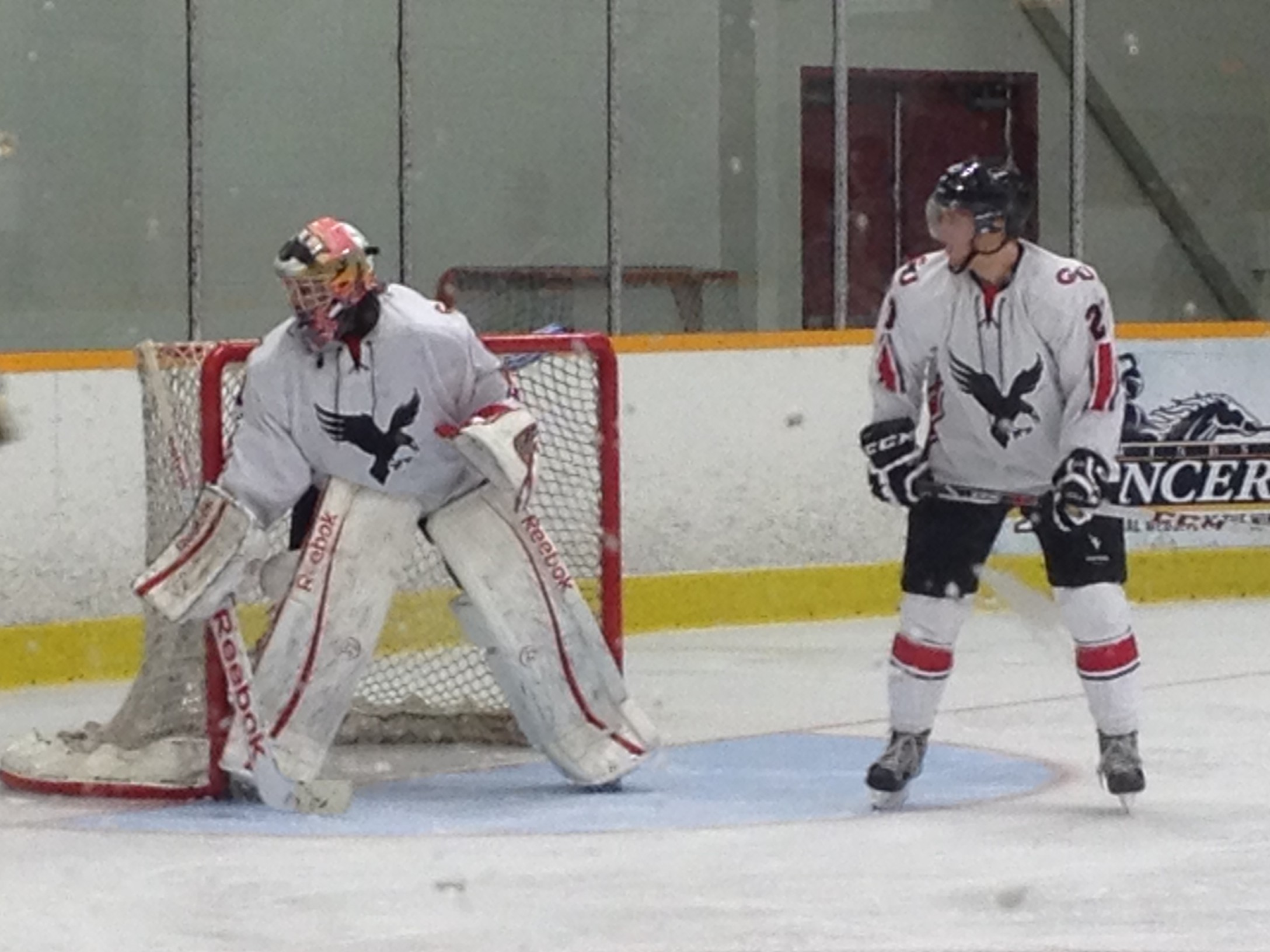
Carleton during 2013–14 season vs. Windsor Lancers.

Carleton was one of several Canadian universities who were searching for a conference to call after World War II. The Ravens banded together with several nearby teams to form the Ottawa–St. Lawrence Conference (OSLC), including the second team from McGill. Carleton withdrew from play in 1951 but returned the following year, spending another three years in the league before withdrawing again in 1955. Carleton was enticed to return to university hockey with the formation of the Ottawa Intercollegiate Hockey League in 1960 and won the league's inaugural championship. However, the conference dissolved after the season and Carleton returned to the OSLC.

In the interim, Carleton's former conference had risen up to the top level of Canadian university hockey. Carleton found itself competing against teams vying for a spot in the University Cup tournament and they acquitted themselves well upon their return. Carleton parlayed their strong play into a promotion to the Quebec–Ontario Athletic Association (QOAA), one of the top leagues in the nation, in 1968 and immediately made a name for themselves with two playoff appearances in two years.

In the 1970–71 season, the Ravens were Ontario-Quebec Athletic Association eastern division champions, led by team captain Derek Holmes. 1971 saw the four existing conferences that shared teams in Quebec and Ontario realigned into two provincial leagues and Carleton was facing many of its former conference opponents once more. Unfortunately, the Ravens tumbled to the bottom of the standings and stayed there for three seasons. In 1974, the school decided to pull the plug and ended the program.

It was 33 years before Carleton played another game of men's ice hockey but the team did finally make its return to the ice in 2007. They were immediately welcomed into Ontario University Athletics, the successor of the QOAA, and were one of the better teams for several years. Carleton made its first appearance at the national tournament in 2014 and have made two more in the years since (as of 2024).

== Season-by-season results ==
=== Senior hockey and intermediate collegiate play ===
Note: GP = Games played, W = Wins, L = Losses, T = Ties, OTL = Overtime Losses, SOL = Shootout Losses, Pts = Points

U Sports Champion	U Sports Semifinalist	Conference regular season champions	Conference Division Champions	Conference Playoff Champions

Season	Conference	Regular Season													Conference Tournament Results	National Tournament Results
Season	Conference	Conference								Overall					Conference Tournament Results	National Tournament Results
Season	Conference	GP	W	L	T	OTL	SOL	Pts*	Finish	GP	W	L	T	%	Conference Tournament Results	National Tournament Results
1949–50	OSLC	?	?	?	?	?	?	?	?	?	?	?	?	?		
1950–51	OSLC	6	1	5	0	–	–	.167	6th	?	?	?	?	?		
1951–52	Independent	?	?	?	?	?	?	?	?	?	?	?	?	?		
1952–53	OSLC	6	0	5	1	–	–	1	T–6th	?	?	?	?	?		
1953–54	OSLC	6	3	3	0	–	–	.500	5th	?	?	?	?	?		
1954–55	OSLC	5	1	4	0	–	–	.200	5th	?	?	?	?	?		
1955–56	Independent	?	?	?	?	?	?	?	?	?	?	?	?	?		
1956–57	Independent	?	?	?	?	?	?	?	?	?	?	?	?	?		
1957–58	Independent	?	?	?	?	?	?	?	?	?	?	?	?	?		
1958–59	Independent	?	?	?	?	?	?	?	?	?	?	?	?	?		
1959–60	Independent	?	?	?	?	?	?	?	?	?	?	?	?	?		
1960–61	OIHL	4	3	0	1	–	–	7	1st	?	?	?	?	?	Won Championship, 10–2 (St. Patrick's)	
Totals										GP	W	L	T/SOL	%	Championships	
Regular Season										—	—	—	—	—	1 OIHL Championship	
Conference Post-season										—	—	—	—	—	1 OIHL Championship	
U Sports Postseason										—	—	—	—	—		
Regular Season and Postseason Record										—	—	—	—	—		

=== Senior collegiate play ===
Note: GP = Games played, W = Wins, L = Losses, T = Ties, OTL = Overtime Losses, SOL = Shootout Losses, Pts = Points

U Sports Champion	U Sports Semifinalist	Conference regular season champions	Conference Division Champions	Conference Playoff Champions

Season	Conference	Regular Season													Conference Tournament Results	National Tournament Results
Season	Conference	Conference								Overall					Conference Tournament Results	National Tournament Results
Season	Conference	GP	W	L	T	OTL	SOL	Pts*	Finish	GP	W	L	T	%	Conference Tournament Results	National Tournament Results
1961–62	OSLC	10	6	3	1	–	–	13	3rd	10	6	3	1	.650		
1962–63	OSLC	14	3	9	2	–	–	8	7th	14	3	9	2	.286		
1963–64	OSLC	14	6	5	3	–	–	15	5th	14	6	5	3	.536		
1964–65	OSLC	14	7	6	1	–	–	15	4th	15	7	7	1	.500	Lost Semifinal, 5–6 (Sir George Williams)	
1965–66	OSLC	16	6	9	1	–	–	13	6th	16	6	9	1	.406		
1966–67	OSLC	18	5	11	2	–	–	12	7th	18	5	11	2	.333		
1967–68	OSLC	16	8	8	0	–	–	16	5th	16	8	8	0	.500		
1968–69	QOAA	15	12	3	0	–	–	24	T–2nd	16	12	4	0	.750	Lost Semifinal, 6–10 (Toronto)	
1969–70	QOAA	15	7	6	2	–	–	16	6th	15	7	6	2	.533		
1970–71	QOAA	15	10	3	2	–	–	22	3rd	16	10	4	2	.688	Lost Semifinal, 5–6 (Toronto)	
1971–72	OUAA	19	4	13	2	–	–	10	12th	19	4	13	2	.263		
1972–73	OUAA	17	3	12	2	–	–	8	11th	17	3	12	2	.235		
1973–74	OUAA	18	4	12	2	–	–	8	11th	18	4	12	2	.265		
program suspended
2007–08	OUA	28	12	13	–	2	1	27	T–12th	30	12	17	1	.417	Lost Division Quarterfinal series, 0–2 (McGill)	
2008–09	OUA	28	13	11	–	3	1	30	11th	34	16	17	1	.485	Won Division Quarterfinal series, 2–1 (Concordia); Lost Division Semifinal series, 1–2 (Quebec–Trois-Rivières)	
2009–10	OUA	28	15	10	–	1	2	33	8th	34	18	14	2	.559	Won Division Quarterfinal series, 2–1 (Queen's); Lost Division Semifinal series, 1–2 (McGill)	
2010–11	OUA	28	18	8	–	0	2	38	4th	34	21	11	2	.647	Won Division Quarterfinal series, 2–1 (Toronto); Lost Division Semifinal series, 1–2 (Quebec–Trois-Rivières)	
2011–12	OUA	28	15	10	–	1	2	33	8th	34	18	14	2	.559	Won Division Quarterfinal series, 2–1 (Toronto); Lost Division Semifinal series, 1–2 (Quebec–Trois-Rivières)	
2012–13	OUA	28	19	7	–	1	1	40	3rd	36	24	11	1	.681	Won Division Quarterfinal series, 2–0 (Queen's); Won Division Semifinal series, 2–1 (Ottawa); Lost Division Final series, 1–2 (Quebec–Trois-Rivières)	
2013–14	OUA	28	22	5	–	1	0	45	1st	39	28	11	0	.718	Won Division Quarterfinal series, 2–0 (Nipissing); Won Division Semifinal series, 2–1 (Queen's); Lost Division Final series, 1–2 (McGill); Won Bronze Medal game, 7–4 (Lakehead)	Lost Pool A Round-Robin, 2–3 (Alberta), 2–3 (McGill)
2014–15	OUA	26	20	5	–	0	1	41	T–3rd	30	22	7	1	.750	Won Division Quarterfinal series, 2–0 (Ontario Tech); Lost Division Semifinal series, 0–2 (Quebec–Trois-Rivières)	
2015–16	OUA	28	20	7	–	0	1	41	3rd	36	25	10	1	.708	Won Division Quarterfinal series, 2–0 (Nipissing); Won Division Semifinal series, 2–0 (McGill); Lost Division Final series, 0–2 (Quebec–Trois-Rivières); Won Bronze Medal game, 4–1 (Guelph)	Lost Quarterfinal, 2–3 (4OT) (Saskatchewan)
2016–17	OUA	28	16	9	–	2	1	35	T–6th	31	17	13	1	.565	Lost Division Quarterfinal series, 1–2 (Quebec–Trois-Rivières)	
2017–18	OUA	28	17	7	–	2	2	38	5th	31	18	11	2	.613	Lost Division Quarterfinal series, 1–2 (Ottawa)	
2018–19	OUA	28	18	5	–	2	3	41	3rd	28	10	17	1	.375	Won Division Quarterfinal series, 2–0 (Quebec–Trois-Rivières); Won Division Semifinal series, 2–0 (McGill); Lost Division Final series, 0–2 (Queen's); Won Bronze Medal game, 4–1 (Western Ontario)	Lost Quarterfinal, 1–2 (New Brunswick)
2019–20	OUA	28	24	3	–	1	0	49	1st	32	26	6	0	.813	Won Division Quarterfinal series, 2–0 (Royal Military College); Lost Division Semifinal series, 0–2 (Concordia)	
2020–21	Season cancelled due to COVID-19 pandemic															
2021–22	OUA	11	4	4	–	2	1	.500	T–10th	12	4	7	1	.375	Lost Division Quarterfinal, 1–6 (Quebec–Trois-Rivières)	
2022–23	OUA	26	14	9	–	2	1	31	8th	30	16	13	1	.550	Won Division Quarterfinal series, 2–0 (Ontario Tech); Lost Division Semifinal series, 0–2 (Quebec–Trois-Rivières)	
2023–24	OUA	28	10	13	–	4	1	25	T–13th	28	10	17	1	.375		
Totals										GP	W	L	T/SOL	%	Championships	
Regular Season										620	325	257	38	.555	4 East Division Titles, 2 OUA Championships	
Conference Post-season										79	41	38	0	.519		
U Sports Postseason										4	0	4	0	.000	3 National Tournament appearances	
Regular Season and Postseason Record										703	366	299	38	.521		

Note: Totals include senior collegiate play only.

== See also ==
- Carleton Ravens women's ice hockey
