= Ontario Tech Ridgebacks men's ice hockey =

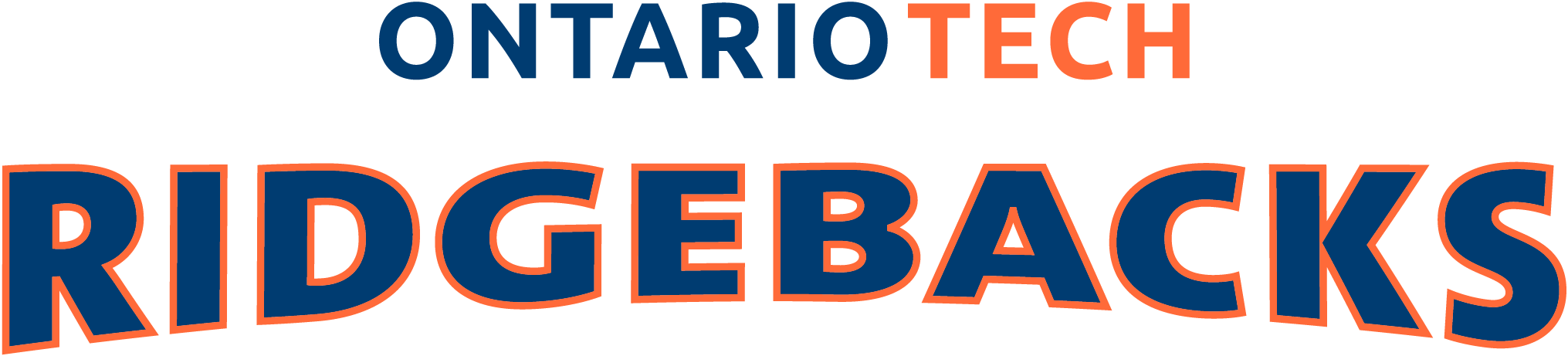
- University: Ontario Tech University
- Conference: OUA; OUA East Division
- Head coach: Curtis Hodgins; Since 2015–16 season
- Assistant coaches: Rob Powers; Joe Piccone; Dave Kennedy
- Arena: Campus Ice Centre; Oshawa, Ontario
- Colors: Blue, Light Blue, and Orange

The Ontario Tech Ridgebacks men's ice hockey team is an active ice hockey program representing the Ontario Tech Ridgebacks athletic department of the Ontario Tech University. The program is a member of Ontario University Athletics in the East division, a conference under the oversight of U Sports. The Ridgebacks play at the Campus Ice Centre in Oshawa, Ontario.

The Ontario Tech Ridgeback men's ice hockey program began with head coach Marlin Muylaert; the first head coach of the program hired for the inaugural season. Muylaert ended his seventh season behind the bench early and was let go midway through the 2013–14 campaign. The assistant coach at the time, Justin Caruana, was given the interim head coach tag and completed the season with the rest of Muylaert's coaching staff, composed of Rob Whistle, David Brown, Ian Young, Matt Reed, and strength and conditioning coach Mark Fitzgerald.

The current head coach is Curtis Hodgins. In his inaugural season (2015–16) with the Ridgebacks, the team set a new season high in wins and points, earned the team's first ever playoff round victory, and received the team's first ever vote for the USports Top 10 ranking. Following the success of '15-16, the Ridgebacks of 2016–17 achieved CIS National Ranking for the first time in program history, earning their highest ranking to date of #4 on November 9, 2016. The Ridgebacks continued to make the playoffs in 2017, 2018, 2019, and 2020, losing in the first round on each occasion. Hodgins would lead the team to their second ever playoff series win in 2022, losing to the eventual national champion UQTR Patriotes in round two. The Ridgebacks returned to the playoffs for a tenth consecutive season in 2022.

== History ==
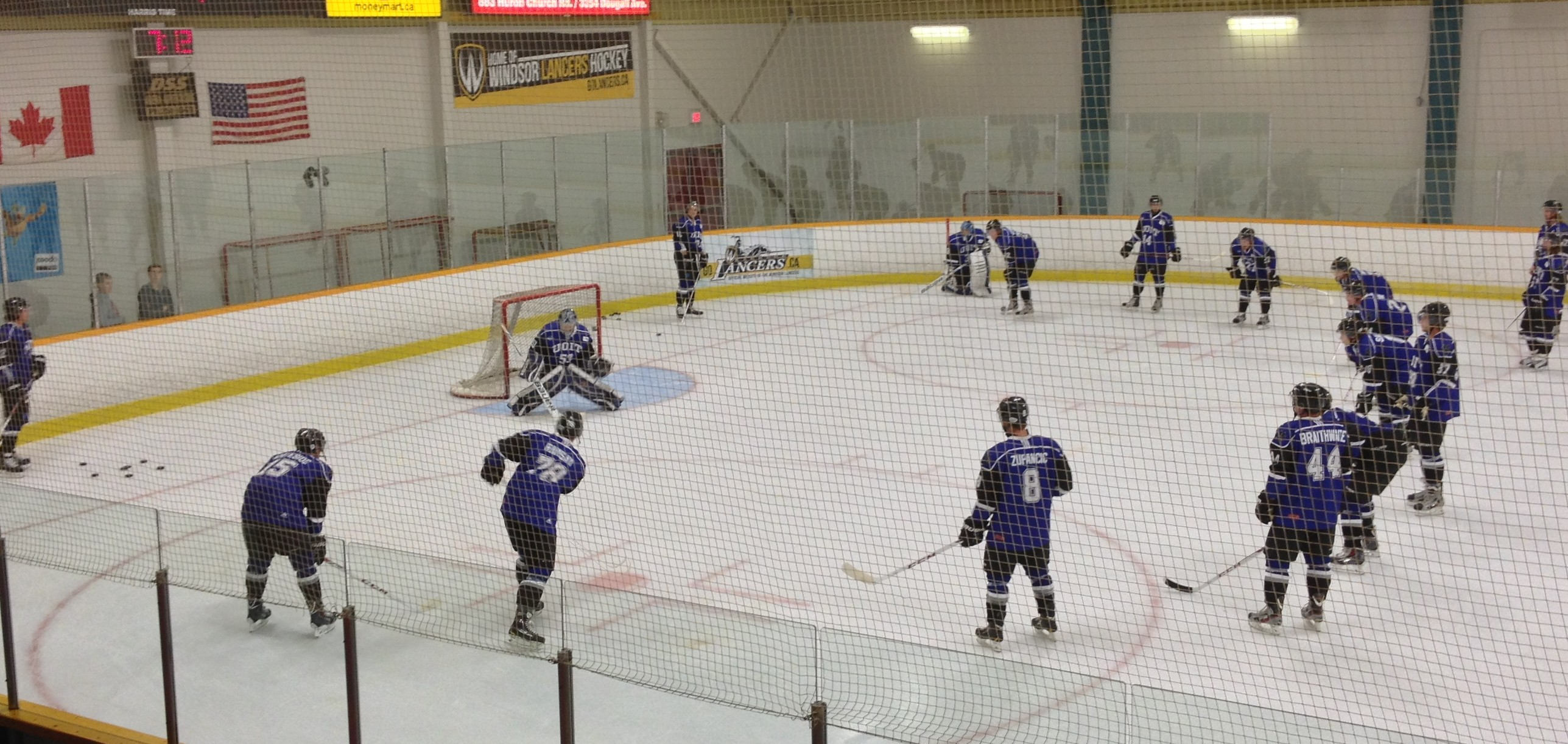
Ridgebacks' warming up the goalie (September 2013)

The University of Ontario Institute of Technology was founded in 2002 by the Legislative Assembly of Ontario as a way to facilitate the influx of college-bound students in 2003.

While the school joined Ontario University Athletics in 2006, the ice hockey team did not begin play until a year later. The team did not see much success under their first head coach, Marlin Muylaert, the former coach of Wisconsin–Eau Claire, but he did shepherd the club to its first postseason appearances and non-losing season. The Ridgebacks finally posted a winning season upon the arrival of Curtis Hodgins in October of 2015. Ontario Tech notched two 20-win campaigns and reached the second round of the conference tournament twice under Hodgins, however, the regular season hasn't been kind to them in 2020s.

== Season-by-season results ==
Note: GP = Games played, W = Wins, L = Losses, T = Ties, OTL = Overtime Losses, SOL = Shootout Losses, Pts = Points

U Sports Champion	U Sports Semifinalist	Conference regular season champions	Conference Division Champions	Conference Playoff Champions

Season	Conference	Regular Season													Conference Tournament Results	National Tournament Results
Season	Conference	Conference								Overall					Conference Tournament Results	National Tournament Results
Season	Conference	GP	W	L	T	OTL	SOL	Pts*	Finish	GP	W	L	T	%	Conference Tournament Results	National Tournament Results
Marlin Muylaert (2007–2013)
2007–08	OUA	28	6	19	–	2	1	15	17th	34	8	23	3	.279		
2008–09	OUA	28	7	16	–	4	1	19	16th	34	8	21	5	.309		
2009–10	OUA	28	11	15	–	0	2	24	15th	37	13	22	2	.378	Lost Division Quarterfinal series, 1–2 (Western Ontario)	
2010–11	OUA	28	12	12	–	2	2	28	T–12th	37	16	16	5	.500	Lost Division Quarterfinal series, 1–2 (Wilfrid Laurier)	
2011–12	OUA	28	6	21	–	1	0	13	18th	33	9	23	1	.288		
2012–13	OUA	28	11	16	–	0	1	23	T–16th	37	11	25	1	.311	Lost Division Quarterfinal series, 0–2 (Western Ontario)	
Justin Caruana (2014)
2013–14	OUA	28	8	16	–	3	1	20	T–16th	36 ^{†}	9 ^{†}	23 ^{†}	4 ^{†}	.306 ^{†}	Lost Division Quarterfinal series, 0–2 (Quebec–Trois-Rivières)	
Craig Fisher (2014–2015)
2014–15	OUA	27	10	15	–	1	0	21	T–16th	33	12	19	2	.394	Lost Division Quarterfinal series, 0–2 (Carleton)	
Curtis Hodgins (2015–Present)
2015–16	OUA	28	18	8	–	1	1	38	T–4th	40 ^{‡}	23 ^{‡}	14 ^{‡}	3 ^{‡}	.613	Won Division Quarterfinal series, 2–1 (Queen's); Lost Division Semifinal series, 0–2 (Quebec–Trois-Rivières)	
2016–17	OUA	28	16	11	–	1	0	33	10th	38	21	14	3	.592	Lost Division Quarterfinal series, 0–2 (Concordia)	
2017–18	OUA	28	15	9	–	3	1	34	9th	35	17	14	4	.543	Lost Division Quarterfinal series, 0–2 (Concordia)	
2018–19	OUA	28	14	9	–	4	1	33	7th	34	16	13	5	.544	Lost Division Quarterfinal series, 0–2 (McGill)	
2019–20	OUA	28	13	12	–	3	0	29	T–11th	36	17	16	3	.514	Lost Division Quarterfinal series, 1–2 (Ottawa)	
2020–21	Season cancelled due to COVID-19 pandemic															
2021–22	OUA	17	8	8	–	0	1	.500	T–10th	25	11	14	0	.440	Won Division Quarterfinal, 6–4 (Concordia); Lost Division Semifinal, 3–6 (Quebec–Trois-Rivières)	
2022–23	OUA	26	13	10	–	3	0	29	10th	34	16	18	0	.471	Lost Division Quarterfinal series, 0–2 (Carleton)	
2023–24	OUA	28	14	10	–	3	1	29	T–9th	35	15	16	4	.486	Lost Division Quarterfinal series, 0–2 (Ottawa)	
Totals										GP	W	L	T/SOL	%	Championships	
Regular Season										526	216	265	45	.453		
Conference Post-season										32	6	26	0	.188		
U Sports Postseason										0	0	0	0	–		
Regular Season and Postseason Record										558	222	291	45	.438		

† Justin Caruana served as interim head coach for the second half of the season.
‡ Craig Fisher was forced to step down in October of 2015 due to lingering concussion symptoms.

=== Regular season and playoff results ===
Season	League	Division	GP	W	L	OTL	SOL	Pts	Pct	GF	GA	Head coach	Season result	Playoff result
2016–17	CIS	OUA East	28	16	11	0	1	33	0.589	88	83	Curtis Hodgins	7th Division, 10th League	1st Round Exit
2015–16	CIS	OUA East	28	18	8	1	1	38	0.643	94	93	Craig Fisher/Curtis Hodgins	4th Division, 4th League	2nd Round Exit
2014–15	CIS	OUA East	26	10	15	1	0	21	0.385	73	106	Craig Fisher	7th Division, 13th League	1st Round Exit
2013–14	CIS	OUA East	28	8	16	4	0	20	0.286	64	110	Marlin Muylaert/Justin Caruana	8th Division, 17th League	1st Round Exit
2012–13	CIS	OUA West	28	11	16	1	0	23	0.393	92	112	Marlin Muylaert	8th Division, 16th League	1st Round Exit
2011–12	CIS	OUA West	28	6	21	1	0	13	0.214	86	138	Marlin Muylaert	9th Division, 18th League	Did Not Make
2010–11	CIS	OUA West	28	12	12	4	0	28	0.429	82	100	Marlin Muylaert	7th Division, 12th League	1st Round Exit
2009–10	CIS	OUA West	28	11	15	2	0	24	0.393	90	119	Marlin Muylaert	8th Division, 15th League	1st Round Exit
2008–09	CIS	OUA Mid West	28	7	16	5	0	19	0.250	83	130	Marlin Muylaert	4th Division, 16th League	Did Not Make
2007–08	CIS	OUA Mid West	28	6	19	3	0	15	0.214	60	128	Marlin Muylaert	4th Division, 17th League	Did Not Make

=== Skaters all-time/career season stat leaders ===
Player Name	Pos.	Games	Goals	Assists	Points	PTS/GP
Josh Vatri	F	104	56	49	105	1.01
Tony Rizzi	F	138	49	54	103	0.75
Nathan Spaling	F	112	30	61	91	0.81
Jesse Stoughton	F	100	46	38	84	0.84
Luke VanMoerkerke	F	133	32	51	83	0.62
Cameron Yuill	F	135	22	56	78	0.58
James Woodcroft	F	132	35	33	68	0.52
Mike Noyes	D	112	20	47	67	0.60
Brendan Wise	F	127	35	29	64	0.50
Kyle Wetering	F	97	27	34	61	0.63
Kevin George	F	105	24	30	54	0.51
Derrick Bagshaw	F	74	26	25	51	0.69
Scott Baker	F	78	20	31	51	0.65
Jake Logan	D	119	5	45	50	0.42
Jason Shaw	D	75	9	40	49	0.65

*Denotes Active Player

=== Goalies all-time/career season stat leaders ===
Player Name	Games played	Minutes played	Wins	Win %	Shutouts	GA	Saves	GAA	Save %
Tyson Teichmann*	15	815	15	0.538	1	39	370	2.87	0.905
Brendan O'Neil*	57	3285	33	0.579	3	174	1603	3.18	0.902
Colin Dzijacky	39	1930	9	0.231	2	118	1011	3.67	0.895
Jason Guy	67	3595	21	0.313	2	234	2003	3.91	0.895
Ben Csiernik	3	93	1	0.333	0	6	50	3.87	0.893
Josh Evans	8	154	0	0.00	0	12	97	4.68	0.890
Bryce O'Hagan	25	1419	10	0.400	1	88	702	3.72	0.889
Josh Sturrock	6	143	0	0.00	0	10	74	4.20	0.881
Jacob Rattie	18	721	3	0.167	0	56	410	4.66	0.880
Matt Mateja	43	2155	9	0.209	1	168	1211	4.68	0.878
Jesse Raymond	6	275	1	0.17	0	19	130	4.15	0.872
Jeff Dawson	44	1913	8	0.182	0	140	939	4.39	0.870

*Denotes Active Player

=== Skaters all-time/career playoff stat leaders ===
Player Name	Pos.	Games played	Goals	Assists	Points	PTS/GP
James Woodcroft	F	9	3	9	12	1.33
Jesse Stoughton	F	9	5	2	7	0.78
Jason Shaw	D	5	2	4	6	1.20
Ryan Doucette*	F	8	3	2	5	0.63
Danny Elser*	F	8	2	3	5	0.63
Mitch Bennett*	F/D	7	2	3	5	0.71
Ben Blasko*	F	8	1	3	4	0.50
Cam Yuill	F	14	2	2	4	0.29
Mike Robinson*	F	10	2	2	4	0.40
Tyler Mayea*	D	8	0	3	4	0.50
Colt Kennedy	F	4	2	2	4	1.00
Connor Jarvis*	F	7	1	2	3	1.00
Brendan Wise	F	4	1	2	3	0.75
Brent Varty	F	3	0	3	3	1.00
Jeremy Whelan	F	3	2	1	3	1.00

*Denotes active player

== Tennis ==
Announced in 2016 after 10 completed seasons competing in Tennis, the University announced the elimination of the program.

== Rowing ==
The Ridgebacks rowing team was first established in 2005 and currently operate out of Durham Rowing Club in Port Perry, Ontario. Currently the team competes in Ontario level regattas during the months of September and October. The team fields both men's and women's rowing at both novice and varsity levels.
