= Nipissing Lakers men's ice hockey =

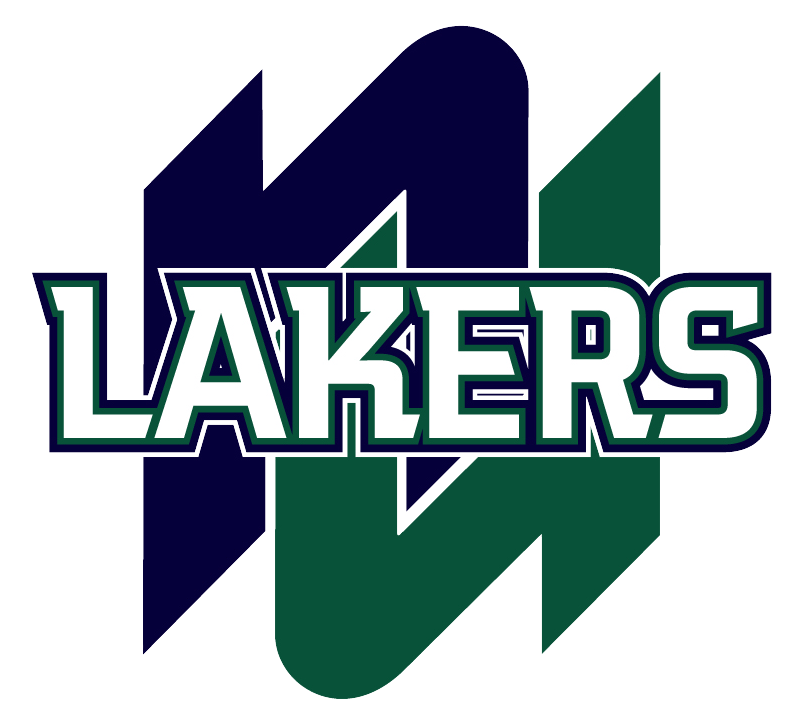
- University: Nipissing University
- Conference: OUA; West Division
- First season: 2009
- Head coach: Mike McParland; 14th season, 143–211–19 .409
- Arena: Memorial Gardens; North Bay, Ontario
- Colors: Blue and Green

The Nipissing Lakers men's ice hockey team is the ice hockey team that represents Nipissing University in North Bay, Ontario. It was granted membership in the OUA's men's ice hockey circuit in 2009.

== Team history ==
=== Conferences ===
- Ontario University Athletics (2009–present)

== Season-by-season results ==
Note: GP = Games played, W = Wins, L = Losses, T = Ties, OTL = Overtime Losses, SOL = Shootout Losses, Pts = Points

U Sports Champion	U Sports Semifinalist	Conference regular season champions	Conference Division Champions	Conference Playoff Champions

Season	Conference	Regular Season													Conference Tournament Results	National Tournament Results
Season	Conference	Conference								Overall					Conference Tournament Results	National Tournament Results
Season	Conference	GP	W	L	T	OTL	SOL	Pts*	Finish	GP	W	L	T	%	Conference Tournament Results	National Tournament Results
Mike McParland (2009–Present)
2009–10	OUA	28	12	15	–	0	1	25	T–13th	30	12	17	1	.417	Lost Division Quarterfinal series, 0–2 (McGill)	
2010–11	OUA	28	17	8	–	0	3	37	5th	32	19	10	3	.641	Won Division Quarterfinal series, 2–0 (Queen's); Lost Division Semifinal series, 0–2 (McGill)	
2011–12	OUA	28	17	7	–	1	3	38	T–4th	30	17	10	3	.617	Lost Division Quarterfinal series, 0–2 (Ottawa)	
2012–13	OUA	28	14	12	–	1	1	30	T–10th	33	16	16	1	.500	Won Division Quarterfinal series, 2–1 (McGill); Lost Division Semifinal series, 0–2 (Quebec–Trois-Rivières)	
2013–14	OUA	28	7	16	–	2	3	19	18th	30	7	20	3	.283	Lost Division Quarterfinal series, 0–2 (Carleton)	
2014–15	OUA	26	12	12	–	2	0	26	T–10th	28	12	16	0	.429	Lost Division Quarterfinal series, 0–2 (Quebec–Trois-Rivières)	
2015–16	OUA	28	12	12	–	3	1	28	T–12th	30	12	17	1	.417	Lost Division Quarterfinal series, 0–2 (Carleton)	
2016–17	OUA	28	8	18	–	1	1	18	18th	28	8	19	1	.304		
2017–18	OUA	28	9	15	–	2	2	22	16th	30	9	19	2	.333	Lost Division Quarterfinal series, 0–2 (Queen's)	
2018–19	OUA	28	8	19	–	1	0	17	19th	28	8	20	0	.286		
2019–20	OUA	28	8	17	–	1	2	19	T–18th	28	8	18	2	.321		
2020–21	Season cancelled due to COVID-19 pandemic															
2021–22	OUA	18	10	7	–	0	1	.583	7th	20	11	8	1	.575	Won Division Quarterfinal, 4–0 (Ottawa); Lost Division Semifinal, 1–3 (McGill)	
2022–23	OUA	26	4	17	–	4	1	13	19th	26	4	21	1	.173		
2023–24	OUA	28	10	13	–	2	3	25	T–13th	29	10	16	3	.397	Lost Play-In, 4–5 (OT) (Wilfrid Laurier)	
Totals										GP	W	L	T/SOL	%	Championships	
Regular Season										378	148	208	22	.421		
Conference Post-season										24	5	19	0	.208		
U Sports Postseason										0	0	0	0	–		
Regular Season and Postseason Record										402	153	227	22	.408		

== Arena ==
=== Memorial Gardens Sports Arena (2009–present) ===
- Capacity: 4000
- Constructed: 1955
- Largest crowd at a Lakers game: 3374 vs. Queen's (Lakers' first ever home game.)

== Media ==
Laker games are streamed live on OUA TV.

The broadcasters for the Lakers on TVCogeco are Ranjan Rupal on play-by-play, Greg Theberge on colour commentary, and Claude Sharma as the rinkside reporter. Bob Coles is the play-by play announcer on CKAT.
