= Thompson Recreation and Athletic Centre =

Indoor arena in London, Ontario

- Thompson Arena
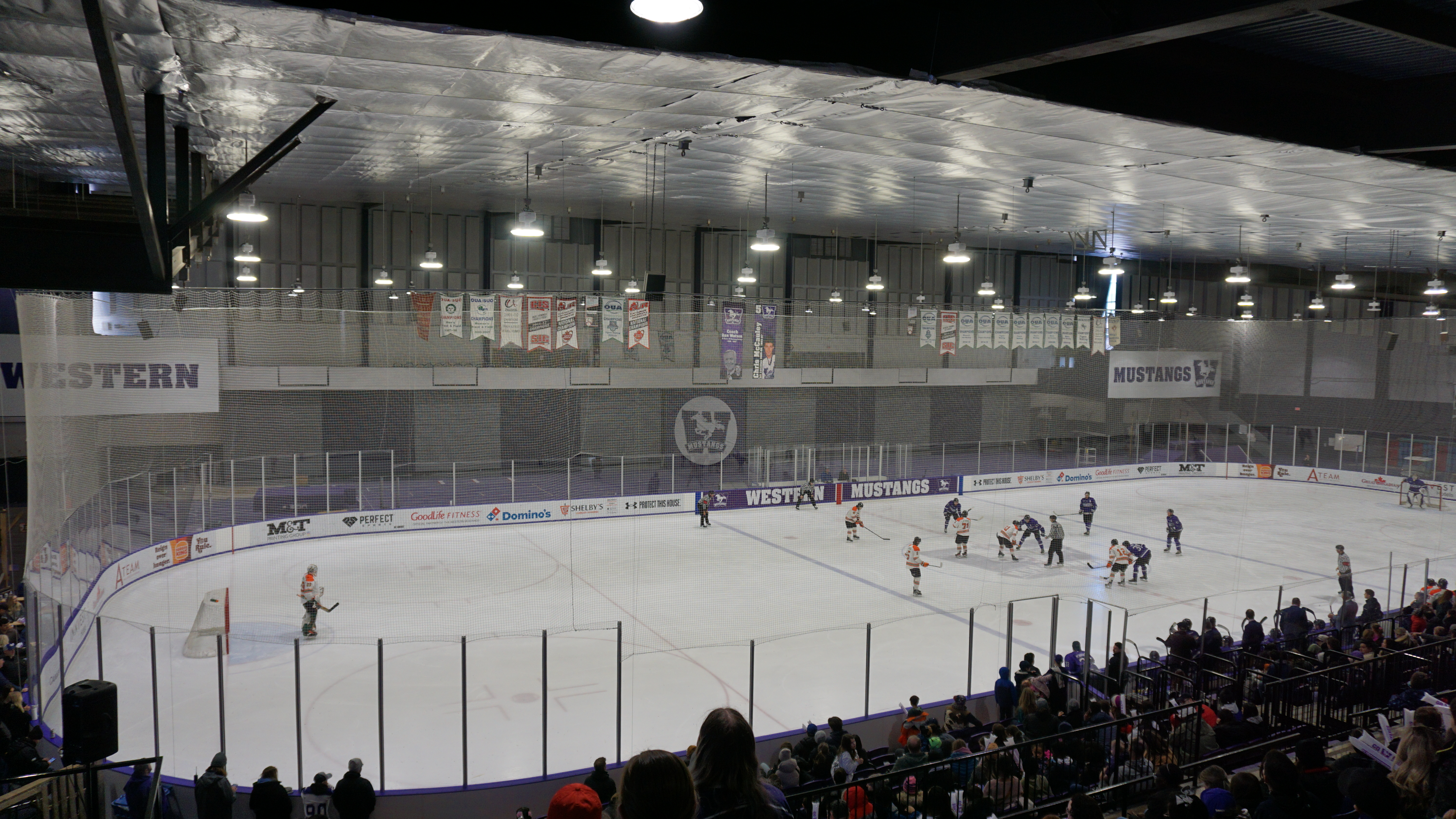
- Interactive map of Thompson Recreation and Athletic Centre
- Location: 1231 Western Road, London, ON N6G 1H3
- Coordinates: 43.0029000°N 081.2757333°W
- Owner: University of Western Ontario
- Operator: University of Western Ontario
- Capacity: 3,615
- Surface: Arena: Ice (200' x 85'); Track: Mondotrack (200m, 4 lane)
- Scoreboard: Yes

Construction
- Opened: 1971
- Architect: Paul M. Skinner

Tenant
- Western Mustangs

Thompson Recreation and Athletic Centre also known as Thompson Arena is an indoor arena and athletic facility on the campus of the University of Western Ontario in London, Ontario. The arena is a full NHL-sized (200' x 85') ice surface with permanent stadium-style seating as well as tiered bleacher seating.

The arena was completed in 1971 and it has a seating capacity of 3,615.

Thompson Arena was designed by renowned architect Paul M. Skinner; it was Canada’s first cable-hung suspension roof, earning special recognition.

Around the ice surface is a 200 metre Mondo indoor track. The indoor track is used primarily by sprinters, distance runners, throwers, and jumpers. During indoor track and field meets, the ice surface is covered and the inner rink becomes a field surface for activities such as pole vault and high jump. As of September 2019, the track was re-surfaced and updated. This update was following criticism on the previous track's degrading condition and overuse.

The annual Don Wright track meet is hosted in the Thompson Arena.

Thompson Arena is the home to some of the teams of the Western Mustangs. The men's and women's ice hockey teams use the arena alongside the ringette and figure skating teams, while the track team uses the indoor track surface.

== Western Student Recreation Centre ==
Attached to the Thompson Arena is the Western Student Recreation Centre. Known as the Rec Centre or Western Rec, it is a multi-level gymnasium facility and aquatic centre. It houses multiple basketball courts, volleyball courts, and squash courts, as well as a large fitness area with two floors of weight training equipment, treadmills, and fitness studios. The facility was opened in February 2009.

The Western varsity swim team and water polo team uses the 8-lane, 50m pool for training as well as hosting swim meets and competitions.

The Athletic Department offices and administration is housed within the Rec Centre.

This large facility comes as a result of a student-led initiative in 2006. Western students held a referendum to fund a majority of the building's $35.7-million cost. From this, the undergraduate and graduate students pledged to donate a total of $101-million over 30 years for the initial purchase, building maintenance and support, with $14.8-million specifically funding undergraduate and graduate student bursaries. This was announced as the largest contribution ever from a student body to a Canadian university.
