= 2013 CIS University Cup =

2013 Potashcorp CIS University Cup Presented By Co-Op

Tournament details
- Venue(s): Credit Union Centre, Saskatoon, Saskatchewan
- Dates: March 14–17, 2013
- Teams: 6

Final positions
- Champions: New Brunswick Varsity Reds (5th title)
- Runners-up: Saint Mary's Huskies

Tournament statistics
- Games played: 7
- Attendance: 38,347 (5,478 per game)

Awards
- MVP: Tyler Carroll (New Brunswick)

The 2013 CIS Men's University Cup Hockey Tournament (51st Annual) was held March 14–17, 2013. It was the first of two consecutive CIS Championships to be held at the Credit Union Centre in Saskatoon hosted by the University of Saskatchewan. The defending champions were the McGill Redmen, but they were unable to defend their title, having been eliminated in the first round of the OUA-East playoffs by the Nipissing Lakers.

The best team in each Pool advanced to the final. All pool games must be decided by a win, there were no ties. If a pool has a three-way tie for 1st (all teams have 1–1 records) than GF/GA differential among the tied teams is the first tie-breaker.

== Road to the Cup ==
=== AUS playoffs ===
Quarterfinals
3	Acadia	5	5	4
6	Moncton	7	2	3
4	St. Francis Xavier	3	4	-
5	Prince Edward Island	4	5	-

Semifinals
1	New Brunswick	7	2	7	5	-
5	Prince Edward Island	2	4	2	1	-
2	Saint Mary’s	2	4	3	1	-
3	Acadia	3	2	2	0	-

Championship
1	New Brunswick	1	2	2
2	Saint Mary’s	0	5	0

Note: * denotes overtime period(s)

=== OUA playoffs ===
Division Quarterfinals; February 13–17
E1	Quebec–Trois-Rivières	5	7	-
E8	Ryerson	2	3	-
E2	Carleton	10	2	-
E7	Queen's	2	1	-
East
E3	McGill	2	4	1
E6	Nipissing	4	1	2
E4	Ottawa	3**	0	3**
E5	Toronto	2	4	2
W1	Western Ontario	8	5	-
W8	Ontario Tech	1	2	-
W2	Windsor	3**	4	-
W7	York	2	2	-
West
W3	Lakehead	2	2	-
W6	Waterloo	7	4	-
W4	Guelph	3	3*	3
W5	Wilfrid Laurier	4**	2	2

Division Semifinals; February 20–24
E1	Quebec–Trois-Rivières	3	8	-
E6	Nipissing	1	3	-
E2	Carleton	3	3	6
E4	Ottawa	1	4	0
W1	Western Ontario	3	3	3
W6	Waterloo	1	4	5
W2	Windsor	2	1	-
W4	Guelph	1	0	-

Division Finals; February 27–March 3
E1	Quebec–Trois-Rivières	1	2	2****
E2	Carleton	4	0	1
W6	Waterloo	3*	5	-
W2	Windsor	2	3	-

Queen's Cup Final; March 9
E1	Quebec–Trois-Rivières	4
W6	Waterloo	1

Note: * denotes overtime period(s)

=== Canada West playoffs ===
Quarterfinal
3	Manitoba	6	5	-
6	Regina	2	0	-
4	Calgary	3	2	4
5	British Columbia	1	4	1

Semifinal
1	Alberta	4	2	-
4	Calgary	0	0	-
2	Saskatchewan	7	1	4
3	Manitoba	1	4	1

Championship
1	Alberta	5	4	5
2	Saskatchewan	0	5*	0

Note: * denotes overtime period(s)

== University Cup ==
The six teams to advance to the tournament are listed below. The wild-card continued its rotation and was held by AUS this season. The 5th- and 6th-place teams switches positions in the brackets to avoid intra-conference matches in pool play.

Rank	Seed	Team	Qualification	Record	Appearance	Last
1	1	Alberta Golden Bears	West: Canada West Champion	27–5–1	36th	2011
2	2	New Brunswick Varsity Reds	Atlantic: AUS Champion	28–7–0	14th	2012
3	3	Quebec–Trois-Rivières Patriotes	Quebec: OUA Champion	28–7–1	18th	2012
4	4	Saint Mary's Huskies	Wild-Card: AUS Finalist	22–10–3	12th	2010
5	5	Saskatchewan Huskies	Host	22–11–1	15th	2012
6	6	Waterloo Warriors	Ontario: OUA Finalist	18–13–5	4th	1996

=== Pool A – Afternoon ===
Seed	Team
1	Alberta Golden Bears
4	Saint Mary's Huskies
6	Waterloo Warriors

March 14, 2013; 1:00 PM	Alberta	1–2 (1–0, 0–0, 1–1)	Waterloo	Credit Union Centre, Saskatoon; Attendance: 6,732 (47.0%)

Game reference

Kurtis Mucha (0–1–0)
Goalies
Keaton Hartigan (1–0–0)

Linesmen:
Kyle Paulsen
Darrell Surminski

J. Larson (C. Behnna, K. Allicock) (PP) – 34:09	1–0
B. Chartier (C. Behenna, K. Hill) (PP) – 47:56	2–0
	2–1	56:30 – T. Dyck (J. Craige) (PP)

24 min
Penalties
12 min
43
Shots
13

March 15, 2013; 1:00 PM	Saint Mary's	3–4 (OT) (1–1, 2–1, 0–1, 0–1)	Alberta	Credit Union Centre, Saskatoon; Attendance: 9,465 (66.1%)

Game reference

Anthony Peters (0–1–0)
Goalies
Kurtis Mucha
Real Cyr (36:06) (1–0–0)
Referees:
Pierre Lambert
Sean Raphael
Linesmen:
Kelsey Mahoney
Derek Craig

M. Tipoff (S. Johnston) – 15:48	1–0
	1–1	19:42 – T. Dyck (S. Ringrose) (PP)
	1–2	22:13 – J. Hickmott (G. Gardner, K. Reddick)
C. Tanaka (P. O'Keefe) – 26:16	2–2
M. Strickland (B. Smith, P. O'Keefe) – 26:45	3–2
	3–3	47:35 – J. Lazo (T. Dyck)
	3–4	62:51 – L. Koper

37 min
Penalties
6 min
20
Shots
40

March 16, 2013; 1:30 PM; Rogers Sportsnet	Waterloo	1–5 (1–1, 0–1, 0–3)	Saint Mary's	Credit Union Centre, Saskatoon; Attendance: 4,339 (30.3%)

Game reference

Keaton Hartigan (1–1–0)
Goalies
Anthony Peters (1–1–0)
Referees:
T.J. Foster
Jeff Ingram
Linesmen:
Jason Roy
Derek Craig

J. Larson (C. Behenna) – 0:25	1–0
	1–1	16:08 – S. O'Donnell (S. Johnston, J. Marchand)
	1–2	26:05 – C. Tanaka (S. O'Donnell, P. O'Keefe)
	1–3	46:18 – S. O'Donnell (G. Grant, C. Tanaka)
	1–4	49:23 – C. Tanaka (S. O'Donnell)
	1–5	54:51 – M. Strickland (C. Tanaka, S. O'Donnell) (PP)

37 min
Penalties
19 min
24
Shots
50

Team	GP	W	L	GF	GA	DIF	PTS
Saint Mary's Huskies	2	1	1	8	5	+3	2
Alberta Golden Bears	2	1	1	5	5	0	2
Waterloo Warriors	2	1	1	3	6	−3	2

Note: Saint Mary's becomes the 4th team to advance to the Championship Final with a 1–1 record (Alberta-2008, Western-2009 and McGill-2011).

=== Pool B – Evening ===
Seed	Team
2	New Brunswick Varsity Reds
3	Quebec–Trois-Rivières Patriotes
5	Saskatchewan Huskies

March 14, 2013; 7:20 PM	New Brunswick	3–1 (0–0, 2–1, 1–0)	Saskatchewan	Credit Union Centre, Saskatoon; Attendance: 5,865 (41.0%)

Game reference

Daniel LaCosta
Goalies
Ryan Holfeld
Referees:
T.J. Foster
Sean Raphael
Linesmen:
Jason Roy
Scott Sharun

	0–1	25:26 – J. Bubnick (K. Bortis, D. Hulak) (PP)
D. Todd (N. MacNeil, M-A Desnoyers) (PP) – 30:47	1–1
T. Carroll (C. Braes, D. Todd) – 29:06 (PP)	2–1
A. Houde-Caron (D. Todd) – 57:17	3–1

8 min
Penalties
10 min
42
Shots
24

March 15, 2013; 7:00 PM	Saskatchewan	1–3 (1–1, 0–0, 0–2)	Quebec–Trois-Rivières	Credit Union Centre, Saskatoon; Attendance: 4,379 (30.6%)

Game reference

Ryan Holfeld (0–2–0)
Goalies
Marc-Antoine Gelinas (1–0–0)
Referees:
Mario Maillett
Jeff Ingram
Linesmen:
Scott Sharun
Darryl Surminski

	0–1	6:21 – T. Tremblay (F. Petit)
K. Bortis (A. Bailey) – 16:49 (PP)	1–1
	1–2	41:11 – O. Donovan (E. Boudreau) (PP)
	1–3	59:59 – T. Tremblay (B. Lacasse, F. Petit)

10 min
Penalties
12 min
19
Shots
23

March 16, 2013; 8:00 PM; Rogers Sportsnet	Quebec–Trois-Rivières	3–8 (3–3, 0–2, 0–3)	New Brunswick	Credit Union Centre, Saskatoon; Attendance: 3,649 (25.5%)

Game reference

Marc-Antoine Gelinas (1–1–0)
Guillaume Nadeau
Goalies
Daniel LaCosta (2–0–0)
Referees:
Kyle Paulsen
Mario Maillett
Linesmen:
Sean Raphael
Kelsey Mahoney

	0–1	0:45 – N. MacNeil (A. Robertson, B. Wright)
	0–2	2:28 – B. Swan (A. Houde-Caron)
F. Petit (B. Lacasse, M. Robichaud) – 3:09 (PP)	1–2
P-O Morin (P-L Lesard) – 4:36	2–2
M. Paquette-Gravel (R. Boudreau) – 8:20	3–2
	3–3	9:59 – T. Carroll (T. Nesbitt, C. Culligan)
	3–4	25:11 – D. Campbell (N. MacNeil, D. Todd)
	3–5	30:53 – N. MacNeil (C. Pridham, D. Campbell)
	3–6	48:36 – T. Carroll
	3–7	53:43 – T. Nesbitt (C. Culligan)
	3–8	55:01 – B. Swan (A. Houde-Caron, T. MacDougall)

12 min
Penalties
24 min
22
Shots
51

Team	GP	W	L	GF	GA	DIF	PTS
New Brunswick	2	2	0	11	4	+7	4
Quebec–Trois-Rivières	2	1	1	6	12	−6	2
Saskatchewan	2	0	2	2	6	−4	0

== Championship final ==
Bench assignments for the championship finals were based on each advancing team's 2 pool games, not their tournament seed. UNB was determined to be the home team with a record of 2–0 versus Saint Mary's with a record of 1–1.

March 17, 2013; 6:30 PM; Rogers Sportsnet	#4 Saint Mary's Huskies	0–2 (0–1, 0–0, 0–1)	#2 UNB Varsity Reds	Credit Union Centre, Saskatoon; Attendance: 3,918 (27.4%)

Game reference
Anthony Peters (1–2–0)	Goalies	Daniel LaCosta (3-0–0)	Referees: Pierre Lambert; Jeff Ingram; Linesmen: Jason Roy; Scott Sharun
0–1 / 10:39 – D. Todd (N. MacNeil, C. Pridham) (PP); 0–2 / 59:49 – T. Carroll (EN)			Referees: Pierre Lambert; Jeff Ingram; Linesmen: Jason Roy; Scott Sharun
32 min	Penalties	20 min	Referees: Pierre Lambert; Jeff Ingram; Linesmen: Jason Roy; Scott Sharun
17	Shots	23	Referees: Pierre Lambert; Jeff Ingram; Linesmen: Jason Roy; Scott Sharun

== Fewest goals ==
The 2 goal aggregate in the Championship final represented the lowest ever to date – one lower than the previous record of 3 (1990, 2–1 and 2003 3–0). The shutout was the fourth shutout in a Championship final (1972, 2003, 2011 and 2013) and the first time a team has accomplished it twice (UNB's 4th Championship title in 2011 was a 4–0 shutout of McGill).

== Tournament All-Stars ==
Tyler Carroll, from the UNB Varsity Reds, was selected as the Major W.J. 'Danny' McLeod Award for CIS University Cup MVP. Carroll led all players in goals (4) and was second in points with 4.

Joining Carroll on the tournament all-star team were:

- Forward: Nick MacNeil (UNB Varsity Reds)
- Forward: Cory Tanaka (Saint Mary's Huskies)
- Defenseman: Jesse Craige (Alberta Golden Bears)
- Defenseman: Marc-Antoine Desnoyers (UNB Varsity Reds)
- Goalie: Dan LaCosta (UNB Varsity Reds)
