= 2012 CIS University Cup =

College hockey tournament

2012 Cavendish Farms CIS University Cup Presented By Home Depot

Tournament details
- Venue(s): Aitken University Centre, Fredericton, New Brunswick
- Dates: March 22–25, 2012
- Teams: 6

Final positions
- Champions: McGill Redmen (1st title)
- Runners-up: Western Ontario Mustangs

Tournament statistics
- Games played: 7
- Attendance: 26,250 (3,750 per game)

Awards
- MVP: Francis Verreault-Paul (McGill)

The 2012 CIS Men's University Cup Hockey Tournament (50th Annual) was held March 22–25, 2012. This event marked the 50th anniversary of the inception of the University Cup tournament to decide the Men's University Hockey Champion. It is the second of two consecutive CIS Championships to be held at the University of New Brunswick's Aitken University Centre before moving to Credit Union Centre in Saskatoon for two years (hosted by the University of Saskatchewan.

The defending champions were the UNB Varsity Reds, who won their 4th title in fourteen years and who return to the tournament with a record of 20–5–3 in CIS play. They were joined by three qualifiers, a designated host team and one wild card for a total of six(6) teams.

Similar to previous years, going back to the introduction of the expanded format in 1998, the teams are split into two(2) Pools of three teams where each team plays the other two teams. The best team in each Pool advances to the final. All pool games must be decided by a win, there are no ties. If a pool has a three-way tie for 1st (all teams have 1–1 records) than GF/GA differential among the tied teams is the first tie-breaker.

== Road to the Cup ==
=== AUS playoffs ===
Quarterfinals
3	Moncton	3	2	1
6	St. Francis Xavier	0	3	0
4	Prince Edward Island	4	3	6
5	Acadia	3	4	5

Semifinals
1	New Brunswick	4	5	3	—	—
4	Prince Edward Island	3	1	2	—	—
2	Saint Mary’s	6	1	1	1	—
3	Moncton	2	3	6	2	—

Championship
1	New Brunswick	8	4	4	—	—
3	Moncton	3	2	0	—	—

Note: * denotes overtime period(s)

=== OUA playoffs ===
Division Quarterfinals; February 15–19
E1	McGill	3	5	—
E8	Queen's	2	1	—
E2	Quebec–Trois-Rivières	2	7	5
E7	Ryerson	9	5	3
East
E3	Nipissing	2	1	—
E6	Ottawa	5	3	—
E4	Toronto	2	3	3
E5	Carleton	6	0	4**
W1	Western Ontario	4	2	—
W8	Wilfrid Laurier	2	1	—
W2	Lakehead	4	5	3
W7	Guelph	5	1	2
West
W3	Waterloo	1	4	—
W6	Brock	2**	7	—
W4	York	4	1	—
W5	Windsor	5*	5	—

Division Semifinals; February 22–26
E1	McGill	5	5	—
E6	Ottawa	3	3	—
E2	Quebec–Trois-Rivières	8	1	3**
E5	Carleton	1	5	2
W1	Western Ontario	5	3	—
W6	Brock	3	2	—
W2	Lakehead	3*	1	2
W5	Windsor	2	4	3*

Division Finals; February 29–March 4
E1	McGill	5	5**	—
E2	Quebec–Trois-Rivières	3	4	—
W1	Western Ontario	3	5	2
W5	Windsor	4	2	0

Queen's Cup Final; March 10
E1	McGill	4
W1	Western Ontario	1
Bronze Medal Game
E2	Quebec–Trois-Rivières	5
W5	Windsor	3

Note: * denotes overtime period(s)

=== Canada West playoffs ===
Quarterfinal
3	Saskatchewan	4	10	—
6	Lethbridge	2	3	—
4	Calgary	3	4	3
5	British Columbia	4	0	2

Semifinal
1	Manitoba	1	3	—
4	Calgary	2	4*	—
2	Alberta	7	2	3
3	Saskatchewan	3	3*	4*

Championship
4	Calgary	2	1	3
3	Saskatchewan	1	4	4

Note: * denotes overtime period(s)

== University Cup ==
The six teams to advance to the tournament are listed below. The wild-card team was selected from the OUA Conference as the CW was provided the wild-card in 2011 and AUS teams are ineligible as they are the host conference.

Rank	Seed	Team	Qualification	Record	Appearance	Last
1	1	New Brunswick Varsity Reds	Atlantic: AUS Champion	25–6–3	13th	2011
2	2	McGill Redmen	Quebec: OUA Champion	24–11–1	6th	2011
3	3	Saskatchewan Huskies	West: Canada West Champion	26–5–2	14th	2008
4	4	Western Ontario Mustangs	Ontario: OUA Runner-up	24–9–0	10th	2009
5	5	Moncton Aigles Bleus	Host	25–9–1	15th	2008
7	6	Quebec–Trois-Rivières Patriotes	Wild-card: OUA Third place	28–5–1	17th	2010

=== Pool A – Evening ===
Seed	Team
1	New Brunswick
4	Western Ontario
6	Quebec–Trois-Rivières

March 22, 2012; 7:00 PM	UNB Varsity Reds	6–1 (2–0, 1–0, 3–1)	UQTR Patriotes	Aitken University Centre, Fredericton; Attendance: 3,750

Game reference

Travis Fullerton (1–0–0)
Goalies
Guillaume Nadeau (0–1–0)
Referees:
Nathan Wieler
Jonathan Langille
Linesmen:
Mike MacDonnell
Ryan Power

D. Todd (T. Carroll, C. Culligan) – 5:12	1–0
M. Fillier (T. MacDougall, A. Houde-Caron) – 7:05	2–0
C. Culligan (D. Todd, T. Carroll) – 27:39	3–0
	3–1	46:26 – F. Petit (F. Lefrançois, P.L. Lessard)
D. Todd (J. Clendenning, L. Gallant) – 47:50	4–1
N. MacNeil (J. Harty) – 50:17	5–1
A. Houde-Caron (T. Carroll) – 56:54	6–1

20 min
Penalties
14 min
33
Shots
21

March 23, 2012; 7:00 PM	UQTR Patriotes	2–3 OT (1–1, 1–1, 0–0) (OT: 0–1)	Western Mustangs	Aitken University Centre, Fredericton; Attendance: 3,750

Game reference

Guillaume Nadeau (0–1–1)
Goalies
Josh Unice (1–0–0)
Referees:
Nathan Wieler
Mario Maillet
Linesmen:
Brett Boyce
Ryan Power

	0–1	2:08 – K. Turkiewicz (Z. Harnden, K. Baker) (PP)
B. Lacasse (A. Demers) – 10:20	1–1
F. Lefrançois (J. Desjardins, P.L. Lessard) (PP) – 33:25	2–1
	2–2	36:41 – S. Reese (M. Ashman, J. Cimadamore)
	2–3	61:21 – J. Cimadamore (S. Reese, G. Killing)

10 min
Penalties
20 min
43
Shots
33

March 24, 2012; 4:30 PM; Rogers Sportsnet	Western Mustangs	3–2 (3–0, 0–0, 0–2)	UNB Varsity Reds	Aitken University Centre, Fredericton; Attendance: 3,750

Game reference

Josh Unice (2–0–0)
Goalies
Travis Fullerton (1–1–0)
Referees:
Francois Fortin
Sean Reid
Linesmen:
Andy Flick
Jay Doiron

D. Desando (K. Turkiewicz, M. Paltridge) – 12:25	1–0
K. Turkiewicz (K. Baker, S. Aarssen) (PP) – 15:20	2–0
J. Furlong (SH) – 17:48	3–0
	3–1	52:43 – J. Harty (K. Bailey, C. Culligan) (PP)
	3–2	56:57 – K. Bailey (C. Culligan, L. Gallant) (PP)

12 min
Penalties
12 min
24
Shots
37

Team	GP	W	L	GF	GA	DIF	PTS
Western Ontario	2	2	0	6	4	+2	4
New Brunswick	2	1	1	8	4	+4	2
Quebec–Trois-Rivières	2	0	2	3	9	−6	0

=== Pool B – Afternoon ===
Seed	Team
2	McGill
3	Saskatchewan
5	Moncton

March 22, 2012; 2:00 PM	Moncton Aigles Bleus	3–6 (1–3, 0–2, 1–2)	McGill Redmen	Aitken University Centre, Fredericton; Attendance: 3,750

Game reference

Pierre-Alexandre Marion (0–1–0)
Goalies
Hubert Morin (1–0–0)
Referees:
Mario Maillet
Sean Reid
Linesmen:
Andy Flick
Brett Boyce

	0–1	3:50 – F. Verreault-Paul (M.A. Dorion, A. Picard-Hooper) (PP)
	0–2	5:37 – A. Picard-Hooper (F. Verreault-Paul, M. Leangelier-Parent (PP)
C. Gaudet (M.A. Cote, C. Bergeron) – 15:11	1–2
	1–3	16:37 – N. Biniek (H. Laporte, C. Longpre-Poirier)
	1–4	32:26 – F. Verreault-Paul
	1–5	32:45 – A. Wright (A. Picard-Hooper)
M.A. Cote (D. Ouellet, Grouxl) (PP) – 46:13	2–5
	2–6	52:40 – N. Biniek (P. Belzile)
D. Ouellet (E. Faille, S. Jodoin) – 57:37	3–6

32 min
Penalties
38 min
24
Shots
19

March 23, 2012; 2:00 PM	Moncton Aigles Bleus	5–1 (2–1, 1–0, 2–0)	Saskatchewan Huskies	Aitken University Centre, Fredericton; Attendance: 3,750

Game reference

Pierre-Alexandre Marion (1–1–0)
Goalies
David Reekie (0–1–0)
Referees:
Jonathan Langille
Francois Fortin
Linesmen:
Jay Dorion
Andrew Connors

	0–1	2:08 – M. Delahey (C. Durand, M. Spafford)
E. Faille (M. Bolduc) (SH) – 10:51	1–1
S. Groulx (E. Faille, D. Ouellet) – 14:56	2–1
F. Rochon (K. Charland, G. Parenteau) – 38:36	3–1
S. Lacroix (C. Bergeron) – 46:25	4–1
E. Faille (D. Ouellet, S. Lacroix) – 59:29	5–1

8 min
Penalties
10 min
32
Shots
21

March 24, 2012; 11:30 AM	Saskatchewan Huskies	4–3 (1–1, 0–1, 2–2)	McGill Redmen	Aitken University Centre, Fredericton; Attendance: 3,750

Game reference

Ryan Holfeld (1–0–0)
Goalies
Hubert Morin (1–1–0)
Referees:
Mario Maillet
Nathan Wieler
Linesmen:
Andrew Connors
Mike MacDonnell

K. Bortis (S. Vey, K. Ross) (PP) – 10:51	1–0
	1–1	14:38 – E. Vossen (A. Picard-Hooper, A. Wright)
C. Smuk (M. Delahey, T. Brisebois) – 22:55	2–1
	2–2	44:12 – F. Verreault-Paul (M.A. Dorion, A. Picard-Hooper) (PP)
D. Hulak (K. Bortis) – 46:24	3–2
	3–3	46:51 – K. Dupont (E. Vossen, A. Wright)
K. Ross (K. Bortis, D. Hulak (PP) – 54:48	4–3

20 min
Penalties
18 min
30
Shots
43

Team	GP	W	L	GF	GA	DIF	PTS
McGill	2	1	1	9	7	+2	2
Moncton	2	1	1	8	7	+1	2
Saskatchewan	2	1	1	5	8	−3	2

- McGill Redmen advance to the Gold Medal final based on the first tie-breaker of having the best GF/GA Differential of +2.

Note: McGill becomes the 3rd team to advance to the Championship Final with a 1–1 record (Alberta–2008 and Western Ontario–2009).

== Championship final ==
Bench assignments for the championship finals is based on the each advancing team's record and stats from their 2 pool games, not their tournament seed. Western was determined to be the home team with a record of 2–0 versus McGill at 1–1.

March 25, 2012; 8:00 PM; Rogers Sportsnet	#4 Western Mustangs	3–4 OT (1–1, 1–2, 1–0, 0–1)	#2 McGill Redmen	Aitken University Centre, Fredericton; Attendance: 3,750

Game reference

Josh Unice (2–1–0)
Goalies
Hubert Morin (2–1–0)
Referees:
Jonathan Langille
Sean Reid
Linesmen:
Mike MacDonnell
Jay Doiron

K. Turkiewicz (Z. Harnden, K. Baker) (PP) – 8:38	1–0
	1–1	15:38 – B. Levesque (M.A. Dorion, M. Langelier-Parent)
	1–2	20:48 – B. Levesque (M.A. Daneau, M.O. Vachon)
K. Baker (S. Aarssen, G. Killing) – 33:49	2–2
	2–3	35:27 – N. Biniek (C. Longpre-Poirier, F. Verreault-Paul)
K. Turkiewicz (K. Baker, S. Aarssen) (PP) – 54:18	3–3
	3–4	66:00 – E. Vossen (A. Picard-Hooper, A. Wright)

6 min
Penalties
19 min
27
Shots
40

== Tournament All-Stars ==
Francis Verreault-Paul, from the McGill Redmen, was selected as the Major W.J. 'Danny' McLeod Award for CIS University Cup MVP despite receiving a 5-minute Major and Game Misconduct in the 3rd period of the Championship final (charging Western Mustangs' goalie, Josh Unice, on a partial break-away), Verreault-Paul was McGill's MVP in their two pool games and was second in tournament goals (3) and tied for 2nd in points (5).

Joining Verreault-Paul on the tournament all-star team were:

- Forward: Alexandre Picard-Hooper (McGill Redmen)
- Forward: Keaton Turkiewicz (Western Mustangs)
- Defenseman: Jonathan Harty (UNB Varsity Reds)
- Defenseman: Marc-André Dorion (McGill Redmen)
- Goalie: Josh Unice (Western Mustangs)
