= UNB Saint John Seawolves =

Athletic teams of University of New Brunswick, Saint John

- University: University of New Brunswick
- Association: CCAA
- Conference: ACAA
- Athletic director: Natasha Kelly
- Location: Saint John, New Brunswick
- Varsity teams: 6 (3 women's and 3 men's)
- Arena: G. Forbes Elliot Athletics Centre
- Soccer stadium: Canada Games Stadium
- Colours: Black, Red, and White
- Website: www.unb.ca/saintjohn/athletics/index.html

The UNB Saint John Seawolves are the men's and women's athletic teams that represent University of New Brunswick from the Saint John campus in Saint John, New Brunswick, Canada. The Seawolves field six varsity teams with three men's teams and three women's teams that compete in the Atlantic Collegiate Athletic Association of the Canadian Collegiate Athletic Association. UNB Saint John student-athletes also compete in cross country and track and field along with UNB Fredericton students on the UNB Reds teams. The university also features club sports that are organized by students and that compete against other university and college club teams.

== Varsity teams ==
Men's sports	Women's sports
Basketball	Basketball
Soccer	Soccer
Volleyball	Volleyball

The Seawolves were first admitted into the Atlantic Collegiate Athletic Association in 1993 where they first fielded men's and women's soccer teams and their women's basketball team. The following year, the men's basketball team and the men's and women's volleyball teams joined the ACAA and UNBSJ had six teams playing varsity sports, a total that stands to this day. In 1996, UNBSJ applied to withdraw all teams due to the closure of the campus, but then applied for reinstatement the next year in 1997, which was granted by the ACAA.

The men's volleyball team won the first ACAA conference championship in program history in 1995 and won again in 2009 and 2010. The women's volleyball team won a conference championship in 1996. The Sealwolves women's soccer team were ACAA conference champions in 2001 and the men's soccer team were conference champions in 2002 and 2003.

== Club teams ==
The University of New Brunswick, Saint John offer students the opportunity to play club sports for their university in lieu of these sports not being supported at the varsity level. The sports featured as of 2021 include women's field hockey, men's football, women's ice hockey, and men's and women's rugby. All club teams also wear red and black, except for the football team whose colours are blue and white.

UNB Saint John Seawolves

General information
- Founded: 2007
- Folded: 2023
- Stadium: Canada Games Stadium
- Headquartered: Halifax, Nova Scotia

Team history
- AFL (2009–2022)

League / conference affiliations
- Atlantic Football League

Championships
- League championships: 1; 2010

=== Football ===
The Seawolves football team was founded by Barry Ogden who had wanted to bring a football team to Saint John so that athletes aged 18 to 24 could play in the area after high school. Ogden began researching the feasibility of the program in 2006 and after organizing with teams in Moncton and Fredericton, the Seawolves began play in the inaugural season of the Atlantic Football League in 2009.

The team lost in the championship game to the UNB Red Bombers in 2009, but won their first Moosehead Cup championship in 2010 over the expansion Dalhousie Tigers by a score of 40–6. The Seawolves returned to the championship game in 2012 and 2013, but lost both games to the Holland College Hurricanes. On March 20, 2023, it was announced that the Seawolves had withdrawn from the league.
