= Atlantic Football League =

Amateur Canadian football league

- Sport: Canadian football
- Founded: 2009
- First season: 2009
- Commissioner: Jim Macdonald
- No. of teams: Four teams
- Country: Canada
- Most recent champion: Dalhousie Tigers
- Most titles: Dalhousie Tigers (7)
- Website: atlanticfootball.co

The Atlantic Football League (AFL) is an amateur club-level Canadian football league that features four teams based in Atlantic Canada. The league is for players aged 18–24 that either attend universities without U Sports football programs or for players in the area. Since member teams operate as club teams (and not varsity teams), they do not receive funding from their universities. Some players eventually join U Sports programs and all Canadian players are eligible to join Canadian Football League teams.

On June 9, 2020, the league announced that they had cancelled the 2020 season due to the COVID-19 pandemic in Canada.

On September 21, 2024, Ella Lord became the first woman to play in the league, playing for the UNB Reds.

== Season structure ==
There are currently four teams in the league and each team plays six games with each team hosting the other once. All teams currently qualify for the playoffs with the top seed hosting fourth place and second hosting third. The finalists then qualify for the league championship game, the Moosehead Cup.

== Teams ==
=== Active teams ===
Team	City	Stadium	Founded (Lineage)	Moosehead Cups
Dalhousie Tigers	Halifax, Nova Scotia	Wickwire Field	2010 (1947–76)	6
Holland Hurricanes	Charlottetown, Prince Edward Island	MacAdam Field	2010	4
UNBF Red Bombers	Fredericton, New Brunswick	BMO Centre	2009 (1949–80)	5
Saint John Falcons	Saint John, New Brunswick	Canada Games Stadium	2024	0

=== Defunct teams ===
Team	City	Stadium	Existence	Moosehead Cups
Moncton Jr. Mustangs	Moncton, New Brunswick	Rocky Stone Field	2009–10	0
UNBSJ Seawolves	Saint John, New Brunswick	Canada Games Stadium	2009–23	1

== Championships ==
Game	Date	Winning team	Score	Losing team
1st	November 21, 2009	UNBF Red Bombers	3–1	UNBSJ Seawolves
2nd	November 20, 2010	UNBSJ Seawolves	40–6	Dalhousie Tigers
3rd	November 19, 2011	Holland Hurricanes	28–0	UNBF Red Bombers
4th	November 3, 2012	UNBF Red Bombers	14–7	Holland Hurricanes
5th	November 2, 2013	Holland Hurricanes	20–12	UNBSJ Seawolves
6th	November 1, 2014	Holland Hurricanes	31–15	UNBSJ Seawolves
7th	November 7, 2015	Holland Hurricanes	32–24	Dalhousie Tigers
8th	November 5, 2016	Dalhousie Tigers	29–11	Holland Hurricanes
9th	November 4, 2017	UNBF Red Bombers	39–35	Dalhousie Tigers
10th	November 3, 2018	Dalhousie Tigers	27–3	Holland Hurricanes
11th	November 2, 2019	UNBF Red Bombers	29–26	Holland Hurricanes
12th	November 6, 2021	Dalhousie Tigers	40–14	UNBF Red Bombers
13th	November 5, 2022	Dalhousie Tigers	27–26	UNBF Red Bombers
14th	November 11, 2023	UNBF Red Bombers	31–28	Dalhousie Tigers
15th	November 2, 2024	Dalhousie Tigers	48–23	UNBF Red Bombers
16th	November 1, 2025	Dalhousie Tigers	25–7	UNBF Red Bombers
17th	October 31, 2026	Dalhousie Tigers	45–21	Holland Hurricanes
