= Jordan Murray (ice hockey) =

Canadian ice hockey player (born 1992)

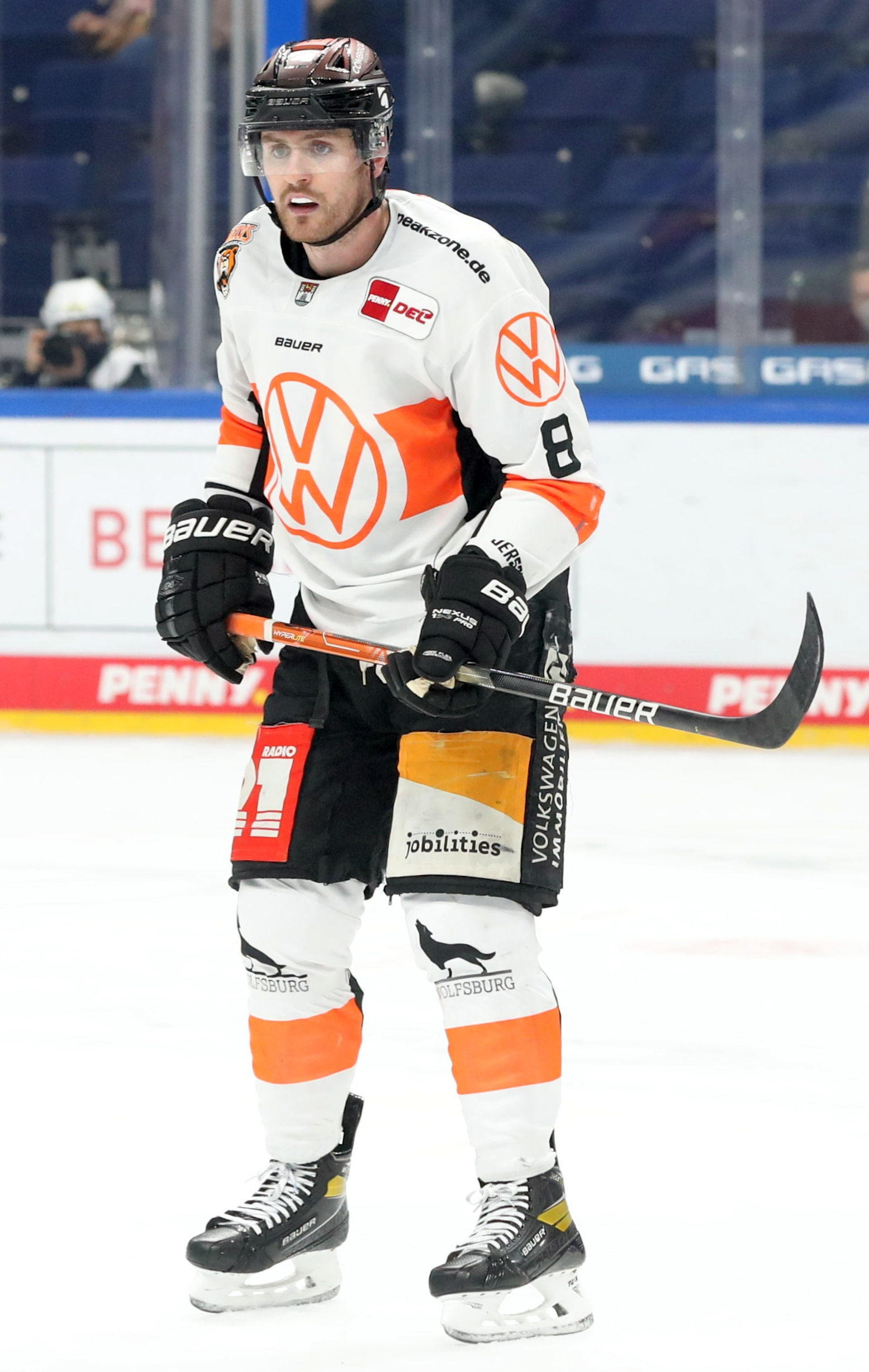
- Born: December 17, 1992 (age 33) Riverview, New Brunswick, Canada
- Height: 6 ft 1 in (185 cm)
- Weight: 195 lb (88 kg; 13 st 13 lb)
- Position: Defence
- Shot: Left
- ICEHL team Former teams: EC KAC; Binghamton Senators; Belleville Senators; Dinamo Riga; HV71; Grizzlys Wolfsburg; Adler Mannheim; Schwenninger Wild Wings
- NHL draft: Undrafted
- Playing career: 2017–2026

Jordan Murray (born December 17, 1992) is a former Canadian ice hockey defenceman who played for EC KAC of the ICE Hockey League (ICEHL).

== Playing career ==
Murray played forward during much of his youth but switched to defence while playing midget AAA hockey for the Moncton Flyers.

=== QMJHL ===
Murray went undrafted in his QMJHL draft year but was later signed by Patrick Roy to join the Quebec Remparts for the 2010-2011 season. At the beginning of training camp, Roy traded Murray to Acadie–Bathurst Titan for a 9th round pick in the 2011 QMJHL draft. Roy stated he didn't have room for him on his blueline but felt he was good enough to play in the league.

He played most of his first season (2010-2011) with the Titan as a bottom 6 forward. He earned a regular spot in the top 4 defence for the Titan in his second season (2011-2012).

At the 2012 QMJHL entry draft, Murray was traded to the Drummondville Voltigeurs. He enjoyed a break-out season with Drummondville in 2012-13 as a top pair defenceman registering 56 points (13G, 43A) in 64 games, good enough for 4th in the QMJHL among defencemen.

==== UNB Varsity Reds ====
Murray committed to UNB for the 2013-14 season. In his first season with Reds, he earned All-Canadian Rookie team honours.

Murray continued that success into his second season at UNB where he helped guide the Reds to the AUS championship followed by the national championship game ultimately falling to the Alberta Golden Bears 6-3. He was also named to the first All-Canadian team and was nominated for the defenceman of the year award.

Once again, he built upon his previous season's success in his third season. At Christmas he was selected as a CIS All-Star to play a two-game series versus Team Canada (Juniors). In March he capturing a national championship defeating St.F X in the final game. He was once again named to the first All-Canadian team and named U Sports Defenceman of the Year leading all AUS defencemen in scoring tying for fifth in the country. At the conclusion of the season, Murray was one of four male CIS (U Sports) athletes nominated for the BLG award which is awarded to the top male athlete in Canadian University Sports.

His senior year at UNB proved to be his most successful. He once again led all AUS defencemen in scoring, this time with 40 points in 30 games which was good enough to lead the country. That point total was tied for seventh in U Sports for all skaters. Jordan also returned as member of the USports All-Star team that played a two-game series against Team Canada (Juniors) in mid-December. For the third year in a row, he was named to the first All-Canadian team and captured back-to-back U Sports Defenceman of the Year honours. He helped UNB capture the national championship for the second consecutive year.

=== Professional ===
On April 5, 2017, Murray signed an ATO contract with the Binghamton Senators. On April 12, 2017, in his third game, he scored a goal and added an assist against Rochester for his first point and goal as a pro.

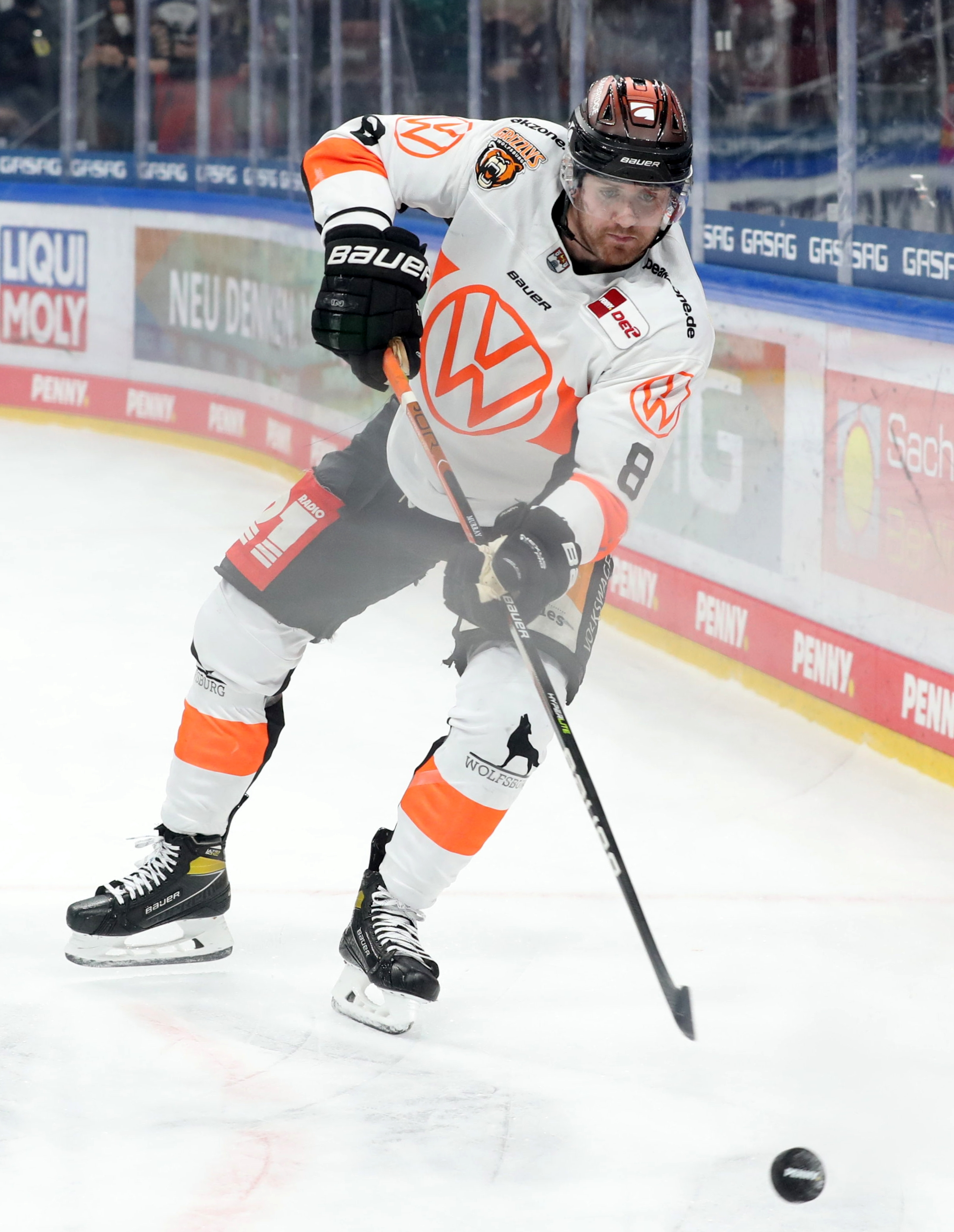
Murray with Grizzlys Wolfsburg (2022)

On April 25, 2017, Murray signed a two-year AHL deal with the Belleville Senators. In the 2017–18 season, on November 11, 2017, Murray recorded his first professional and first Belleville Senators Hat-trick.

On October 2, 2020, with North American professional hockey start dates in doubt, Latvian club Dinamo Riga of the KHL announced that they signed Murray for the remainder of the 2020–21 season. He leaves the Belleville Senators franchise as its leader in games played by skater (169) and points (83), goals (23) and assists (60) by a defenceman. After mutually parting ways with Riga on January 28, 2021, Murray signed with Swedish Hockey League club HV71 on February 1, 2021 for the remainder of the 2020–21 season. He made 13 regular season appearances with HV71, posting 3 points, however was unable to help prevent the club from relegation to the HockeyAllsvenskan in the post-season.

Murray left HV71 as a free agent and moved to Germany after signing a one-year contract with Grizzlys Wolfsburg of the DEL on July 7, 2021.

On April 17, 2023, Murray left Wolfsburg to sign a one-year deal with the DEL's Adler Mannheim.

== Career statistics ==
			Regular season					Playoffs
Season	Team	League	GP	G	A	Pts	PIM	GP	G	A	Pts	PIM
2009–10	Dieppe Commandos	MJAHL	1	0	0	0	4	—	—	—	—	—
2010–11	Acadie–Bathurst Titan	QMJHL	54	6	4	10	37	4	0	0	0	2
2011–12	Acadie–Bathurst Titan	QMJHL	68	7	22	29	94	6	1	0	1	10
2012–13	Drummondville Voltigeurs	QMJHL	64	13	43	56	58	5	0	4	4	4
2013–14	University of New Brunswick	AUS	28	7	13	20	36	4	0	1	1	18
2014–15	University of New Brunswick	AUS	26	8	15	23	36	7	2	7	9	4
2015–16	University of New Brunswick	AUS	27	5	23	28	60	5	1	2	3	2
2016–17	University of New Brunswick	AUS	30	14	26	40	46	7	1	1	2	16
2016–17	Binghamton Senators	AHL	5	1	1	2	2	—	—	—	—	—
2017–18	Belleville Senators	AHL	58	8	15	23	49	—	—	—	—	—
2017–18	Brampton Beast	ECHL	3	1	0	1	2	—	—	—	—	—
2018–19	Belleville Senators	AHL	54	9	17	26	38	—	—	—	—	—
2019–20	Belleville Senators	AHL	57	6	28	34	61	—	—	—	—	—
2020–21	Dinamo Riga	KHL	11	1	6	7	18	—	—	—	—	—
2020–21	HV71	SHL	13	1	2	3	39	—	—	—	—	—
2021–22	Grizzlys Wolfsburg	DEL	49	7	34	41	98	8	1	3	4	2
2022–23	Grizzlys Wolfsburg	DEL	53	8	19	27	71	14	1	8	9	47
2023–24	Adler Mannheim	DEL	41	1	6	7	26	—	—	—	—	—
2024–25	Schwenninger Wild Wings	DEL	47	5	17	22	34	3	1	2	3	0
2025–26	EC KAC	ICEHL	20	4	5	9	13	1	0	0	0	0
AHL totals			174	24	61	85	150	—	—	—	—	—

== Awards and honours ==
Honours	Year
CIS All-Rookie Team	2014
AUS Defenceman of the Year	2015
CIS First Team All-Canadian	2015
UCup Tournament All-Star	2015
CIS Defenceman of the Year	2016
CIS First Team All-Canadian	2016
UCup Tournament All-Star	2016
USports Defenceman of the Year	2017
USports First Team All-Canadian	2017

Title	Year
AUS Conference Champion	2015
CIS National Champion	2016
CIS National Champion	2017
