= U Sports Defenceman of the Year =

The U Sports Defenceman of the Year is the annual award presented to the U Sports men's ice hockey player who is judged by a committee of the U Sports Men’s Hockey Coaches Association to be the most outstanding defenceman in U Sports.

== Winners ==
- 2009-10: Marc-Andre Dorion (McGill Redmen)
- 2010-11: Andrew Hotham (Saint Mary's Huskies)
- 2011-12: Marc-Andre Dorion (McGill Redmen)
- 2012-13: Pierre-Luc Lessard (UQTR Patriotes)
- 2013-14: Ryan McKiernan (McGill Redmen)
- 2014-15: Jesse Craige (Alberta Golden Bears)
- 2015-16: Jordan Murray (UNB Varsity Reds)
- 2016-17: Jordan Murray (UNB Varsity Reds)
- 2017-18: Jason Fram (Alberta Golden Bears)
- 2018-19: Jason Fram (Alberta Golden Bears)
- 2019-20: Nikolas Brouillard (McGill Redmen)
- 2020-21: Not awarded due to COVID-19
- 2021-22: Nicolas Matinnen (Ottawa Gee-Gees)
- 2022-23: Connor Hobbs (Saskatchewan)
- 2023-24: Kale McCallum (UNB Reds)
- 2024-25: Clay Hanus (Mount Royal Cougars)
