= Jonathan Harty =

German-born Canadian ice hockey player

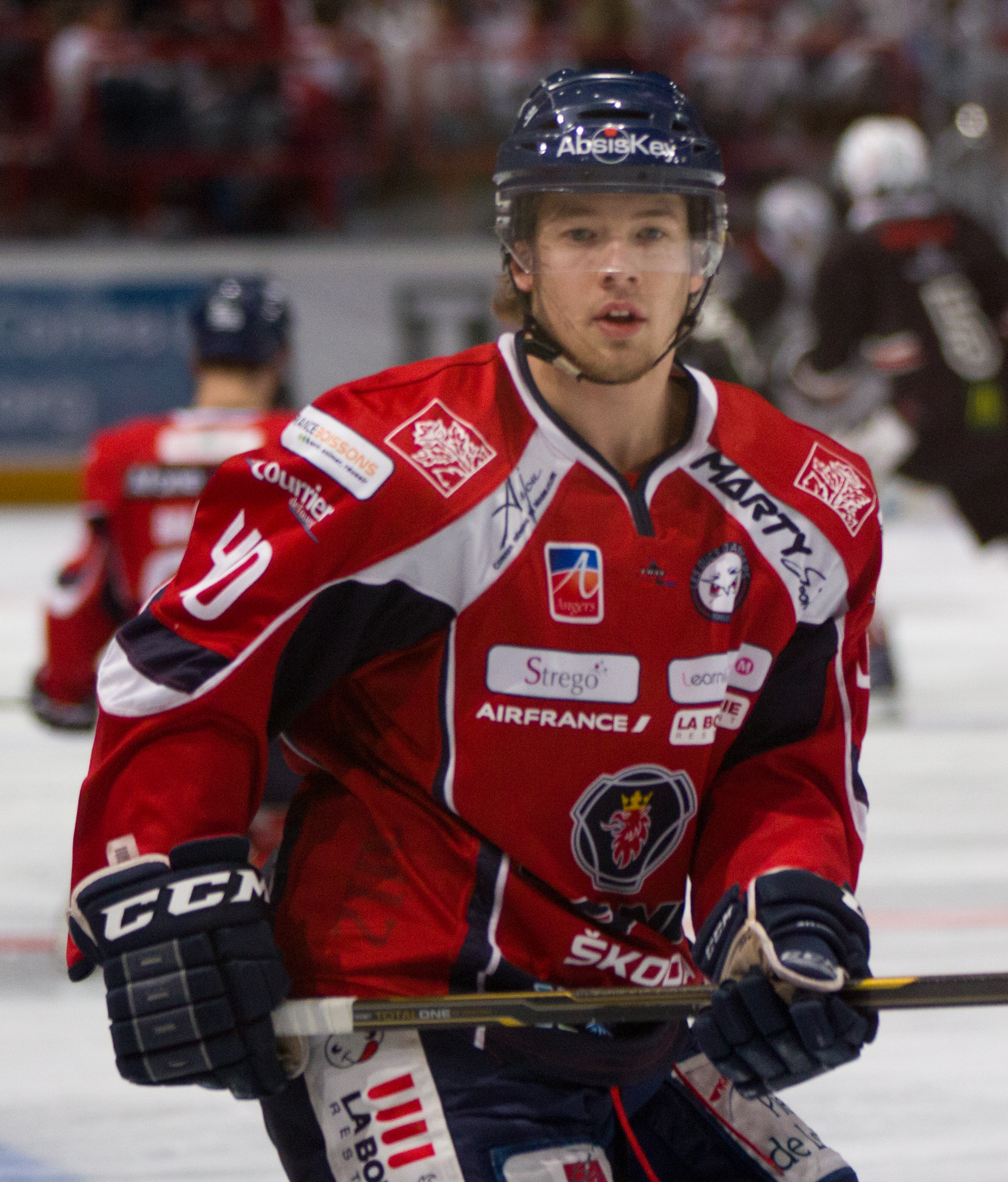
- Born: April 7, 1988 (age 37); Lahr, Germany
- Height: 5 ft 11 in (180 cm)
- Weight: 216 lb (98 kg; 15 st 6 lb)
- Position: Defence
- Shoots: Left
- EBEL team Former teams: Fehérvár AV19; Ducs d'Angers; Mora IK; IF Björklöven; Brûleurs de Loups; HDD Olimpija Ljubljana; Heilbronner Falken
- NHL draft: Undrafted
- Playing career: 2012–present

Jonathan Harty (born April 7, 1988) is a German born Canadian professional ice hockey defenceman, currently playing for Fehérvár AV19 of the Austrian Hockey League (EBEL).

== Playing career ==
After a four-year major junior career with the Everett Silvertips of the Western Hockey League, Harty played collegiate hockey with the University of New Brunswick of the Canadian Interuniversity Sport. Upon completion of a decorated career with the Varsity Reds, Harty began his professional career at the tail end of the 2011–12 season in the ECHL with the Kalamazoo Wings.

With limited North American interest, Harty signed his first full professional contract in France with Ducs d'Angers of the Ligue Magnus on June 12, 2012. In re-uniting with previous junior Silvertips assistant coach Jay Varady, Harty competed in 18 games with the league-leading "Ducs" (= long-eared owl) to compile two goals and 11 points in the 2012–13 season.

On June 1, 2013, Harty left the French league as a free agent and signed a one-year contract with Swedish HockeyAllsvenskan club, Mora IK. On June 23, 2014, Harty signed a one-year contract with fellow HockeyAllsvenskan team IF Björklöven.

After spending a second season in the French Ligue Magnus with Brûleurs de Loups, Harty left as a free agent to sign a one-year contract with Slovenian outfit, HDD Olimpija Ljubljana of the Austrian EBEL on July 8, 2016.

== Career statistics ==
=== Regular season and playoffs ===
			Regular season					Playoffs
Season	Team	League	GP	G	A	Pts	PIM	GP	G	A	Pts	PIM
2003–04	Grande Prairie Storm	AJHL	5	0	0	0	0	—	—	—	—	—
2004–05	Everett Silvertips	WHL	58	2	9	11	42	11	0	0	0	0
2005–06	Everett Silvertips	WHL	53	3	8	11	70	14	1	1	2	8
2006–07	Everett Silvertips	WHL	70	5	18	23	156	12	1	0	1	13
2007–08	Everett Silvertips	WHL	65	11	34	45	143	4	2	3	5	6
2008–09	University of New Brunswick	CIS	28	4	7	11	58	6	2	2	4	6
2009–10	University of New Brunswick	CIS	16	4	11	15	69	3	0	1	1	14
2010–11	University of New Brunswick	CIS	28	5	14	19	100	9	0	3	3	6
2011–12	University of New Brunswick	CIS	26	7	20	27	36	2	0	0	0	0
2011–12	Kalamazoo Wings	ECHL	3	0	0	0	15	2	0	0	0	0
2012–13	Ducs d'Angers	FRA	18	2	9	11	52	16	2	5	7	54
2013–14	Mora IK	Allsv	46	3	6	9	97	6	0	1	1	10
2014–15	IF Björklöven	Allsv	19	0	6	6	74	5	0	0	0	2
2015–16	Brûleurs de Loups	FRA	22	3	10	13	46	5	1	1	2	8
2016–17	HDD Olimpija Ljubljana	EBEL	23	5	8	13	24	—	—	—	—	—
2016–17	Heilbronner Falken	DEL2	26	2	15	17	89	—	—	—	—	—
2017–18	Fehérvár AV19	EBEL	32	2	12	14	20	—	—	—	—	—
2018–19	Fehérvár AV19	EBEL	52	5	13	18	45	6	2	0	2	2
FRA totals			18	2	9	11	52	16	2	5	7	54

=== International ===
Year	Team	Event	Result	GP	G	A	Pts	PIM
2005	Canada Atlantic	U17	3rd place, bronze medalist(s)	6	0	6	6	10
Junior totals				6	0	6	6	10

== Awards and honours ==
Award	Year
CIS
All-Tournament Team	2011, 2012
University Cup Champion	2011
First All-Star Team	2012
All-Canadian Second Team	2012
