= 2016 CIS University Cup =

Canadian university ice hockey championship

Tournament details
- Venue(s): Scotiabank Centre, Halifax, Nova Scotia
- Dates: March 17–20, 2016
- Teams: 8

Final positions
- Champions: New Brunswick Varsity Reds (6th title)
- Runners-up: St. Francis Xavier X-Men
- Third place: Saint Mary's Huskies
- Fourth place: Saskatchewan Huskies

Tournament statistics
- Games played: 8
- Attendance: 43,513 (5,439 per game)

Awards
- MVP: Philippe Halley (New Brunswick)

The 2016 CIS Men's University Cup Hockey Tournament (54th Annual) was held March 17–20, 2016, in Halifax, Nova Scotia, to determine a national champion for the 2015–16 CIS men's ice hockey season. It was the second of two consecutive CIS Championships to be held at the Scotiabank Centre in Halifax.

Saint Mary's University was the designated host for this championship as St. Francis Xavier University was the host in 2015 (at the same venue). The St. Francis Xavier X-Men did qualify for this event by winning the AUS Championships.

This was the most successful tournament for attendance setting a new record of 43,513. It also proved to be the last Men's University Cup that was branded as a CIS championship. On October 20, 2016, Canadian Interuniversity Sport, the country's governing body for university athletics and the organizer of the University Cup, changed its name to U Sports.

== Road to the Cup ==
=== AUS playoffs ===
Quarter-finals (Best of 3)
3	Acadia Axemen	0
6	UPEI Panthers	2
4	Saint Mary's Huskies	2
5	Moncton Aigles Bleu	0

Semi-finals (Best of 5)
1	UNB Varsity Reds	3
6	UPEI Panthers	0
2	St. Francis Xavier X-Men	3
4	Saint Mary's Huskies	1

AUS Championship (Best of 3)
1	UNB Varsity Reds	0
2	St. Francis Xavier X-Men	2

There was no Bronze Medal (3rd place) series as Saint Mary's did not advance to the AUS Finals and as such would take the host spot.

=== OUA playoffs ===
Division Quarter-finals (Best of 3); OUA Sweet 16	Division Semi-finals (Best of 3); OUA Quarter-Finals
1E	UQTR Patriotes	2
8E	Laurentian Voyageurs	0
1E	UQTR Patriotes	2
4E	UOIT Ridgebacks	0
4E	UOIT Ridgebacks	2
5E	Queen's Golden Gaels	1
OUA East
2E	McGill Redmen	2
7E	Concordia Stingers	0
2E	McGill Redmen	0
3E	Carleton Ravens	2
3E	Carleton Ravens	2
6E	Nipissing Lakers	0
1W	York Lions	1
8W	Toronto Varsity Blues	2
7W	Toronto Varsity Blues	1
2W	Western Mustangs	2
2W	Western Mustangs	2
7W	Laurier Golden Hawks	0
OUA West
4W	Guelph Gryphons	2
5W	Windsor Lancers	1
4W	Guelph Gryphons	2
6W	Ryerson Rams	1
3W	Waterloo Warriors	0
6W	Ryerson Rams	2

Division Finals (Best of 3); OUA Semi-Finals
1E	UQTR Patriotes	2
3E	Carleton Ravens	0
4W	Guelph Gryphons	1
2W	Western Mustangs	2

Queen's Cup (Single Game); OUA Championship
1E	UQTR Patriotes	4 OT1
2W	Western Mustangs	3

Bronze Medal (Single Game)
3E	Carleton Ravens	4
4W	Guelph Gryphons	1

=== Canada West playoffs ===
Quarter-finals (Best of 3)
4	Manitoba Bisons	0
5	Calgary Dinos	2
3	Mount Royal Cougars	2
6	UBC Thunderbirds	0

Semi-finals (Best of 3)
1	Saskatchewan Huskies	2
5	Calgary Dinos	0
2	Alberta Golden Bears	2
3	Mount Royal Cougars	0

Canada West Championship (Best of 3)
1	Saskatchewan Huskies	2
2	Alberta Golden Bears	0

== University Cup tournament ==
The eight teams to advance to the tournament are listed below. The three(3) conference champions must be seeded 1–3 followed by the OUA Runner-up (seed #4). The remaining four seeds are for the AUS Finalist, Canada West Finalist, OUA Third-place and host. Their seedings are based on the pre-tournament rankings.

Rank	Seed	Team	Qualified
1	1	UQTR Patriotes	OUA Champion
2	2	Saskatchewan Huskies	Canada West Champion
3	3	St. Francis Xavier X-Men	AUS Champion
5	4	Western Ontario Mustangs	OUA Finalist
4	5	UNB Varsity Reds	AUS Finalist
6	6	Alberta Golden Bears	Canada West Finalist
7	7	Carleton Ravens	OUA Third Place
8	8	Saint Mary's Huskies	Host

=== Tournament format ===
The tournament is a traditional 8 team – Single Elimination ladder with bronze medal game between the two Semi-final losers. Games that are tied after regulation play a 10-minute Overtime period following the 3rd period. If there is no score after the first overtime, the ice is cleaned and they will play 20 minute periods (with ice cleaned between periods) until there is a winner.

The higher seed is the 'Home' team for each game (the home team must wear their 'white' jerseys and will get the last change during stoppages of play).

The UNB Varsity Reds played as the visitor in games 1 and 3 and as the home team in game 2. St. Francis Xavier X-Men were the opposite; the home team for games 1 and 3 and the visitor in game 2.

Quarter-finals (Single Game)
2	Saskatchewan Huskies	3 OT4
7	Carleton Ravens	2
Thursday
3	St. Francis Xavier X-Men	6
6	Alberta Golden Bears	2
4	Western Ontario Mustangs	1
5	UNB Varsity Reds	5
Friday
1	UQTR Patriotes	2
8	Saint Mary's Huskies	3

Semi-finals (Single Game)
2	Saskatchewan Huskies	1
3	St. Francis Xavier X-Men	2 OT3
5	UNB Varsity Reds	4
8	Saint Mary's Huskies	0

Championship final (Single Game)
3	St. Francis Xavier X-Men	1
5	UNB Varsity Reds	3

Bronze Medal (Single Game)
2	Saskatchewan Huskies	2
8	Saint Mary's Huskies	5

=== Overtime ===
Games that ended in a regulation tie would be resolved solely on 5-on-5 overtime (5 skaters and a goalie for each side) until one team scored. The first overtime period would be 10 minute and would start after a 3-minute rest. Following this period, the ice would be cleaned and subsequent 20 minute periods would be played.

The first game of the tournament set a record for the longest game every played at the tournament ending in a 3–2 quadruple overtime victory for the Saskatchewan Huskies over the Carleton Ravens. The total time was 116:11 (60+10+20+20+6:11), 4 minutes short of 2 complete games. The previous record was 103:17 and occurred in 2002 when Western won 4–3 in triple overtime over UQTR in the championship final. The longest game ever in the CIS occurred February 27, 2011 between the host UNB Varsity Reds and visiting Acadia Axemen in game one of their best of 5 second round AUS playoff series (AUS Semi-finals). UNB won 3–2 in quadruple overtime ending at 11:53 of the 4th overtime period – 121:53 (60+10+20+20+11:53).

The semi-final match between Saskatchewan Huskies and St. Francis Xavier X-Men also went into overtime. St. Francis Xavier X-Men won 3–2 in triple overtime. The total time was 107:35 (60+10+20+17:35).

As a result of playing in the longest University Cup game in history and a subsequent triple overtime game, in game #2 (the second longest game in tournament history), the Saskatchewan Huskies finished the tournament having played 283:46 minutes (116:11+107:35+60) when including their play in the bronze medal game. This totals 4.7 games, close to 2 more games than expected in a 3-game tournament.

== Bronze game ==
March 20, 2016; 14:00 (local)	Saint Mary's Huskies #8	5–2 (1–1, 2–1, 2–0)	Saskatchewan Huskies #2	Scotiabank Centre, Halifax; Attendance: 2,535 (24.2%)

Cole Cheveldave (1–1)
Goalies
Jordon Cooke (1–1)
Referees:
Tom Sweeney
Trevor Peluk
Linesmen:
Josh DeYoung
John MacDonnell

A. Repaci (1) (A. Hardie) – 4:13	1–0
	1–1	4:34 – J. Ross (1) (D. Stumborg, P. Thomas)
	1–2	20:31 – J. Roach (1) (C. Cox, J. Yakubowski)
C. Brooks (1) (K. Pereira, S. Macaulay) (PP) – 31:33	2–2
G. Grant (1) (F. Menard – 33:27	3–2
S. Macaulay (1) (A. Repaci, T. Burke) – 45:05	4–2
C. Brooks (1) (Ben Duffy) – 53:39	5–2

4 min
Penalties
4 min
31
Shots
19

Game MVPs: Calder Brooks (SMU) & Jesse Ross (USK)

== Championship final ==
March 20, 2016; 18:30 (local); Sportsnet 360; TVA Sports 2	UNB Varsity Reds #5	3–1 (1–1, 2–0, 0–0)	St. Francis Xavier X-Men #3	Scotiabank Centre, Halifax; Attendance: 9,873 (93.2%)

Étienne Marcoux (2–0)
Goalies
Drew Owsley (2–0)
Referees:
Olivier Gouin
Jonathan Langille
Linesmen:
Mike MacDonnell
Brett Boyce

C. Clappert (1) (J. Murray, C. Braes) – 6:53	1–0
	1–1	19:49 – Z. Macqueen (1) (N. Chiarlitti, C. Macintosh)
F. Beauvillier (1) (R. Gazzola, P. Halley) (PP) – 29:02	2–1
T. Carroll (1) (D. Willick, M. Boudens) – 29:19	3–1

8 min
Penalties
8 min
30
Shots
23

Game MVPs: Christopher Clapperton (UNB) & Eric Locke (SFX)

== Tournament All-Stars ==
Philippe Halley, from the UNB Varsity Reds, was selected as the Major W.J. 'Danny' McLeod Award for CIS University Cup MVP. Halley had 6 goals and 1 assist for 7 points in 3 games. His 6 goals were scored as two consecutive hat-tricks, one each in his first two games of the tournament.

Joining Halley on the tournament all-star team were:
Forward: Anthony Repaci (Saint Mary's Huskies)
Forward: Michael Clarke (St. Francis Xavier X-Men)
Defenceman: Nathan Chiarlitti (St. Francis Xavier X-Men)
Defenceman: Jordan Murray (UNB Varsity Reds)
Goalie: Jordon Cooke (Saskatchewan Huskies)
