= Dan LaCosta =

Canadian ice hockey player

- Born: March 28, 1986 (age 40) Labrador City, Newfoundland, Canada
- Height: 6 ft 1 in (185 cm)
- Weight: 186 lb (84 kg; 13 st 4 lb)
- Position: Goaltender
- Caught: Left
- Played for: Columbus Blue Jackets; Cardiff Devils
- NHL draft: 93rd overall, 2004; Columbus Blue Jackets
- Playing career: 2006–2013

Dan LaCosta (born March 28, 1986) is a Canadian former professional ice hockey goaltender. He played 4 games in the National Hockey League with the Columbus Blue Jackets between 2008 and 2009. He was drafted in the third round, 94th overall, by the Blue Jackets in the 2004 NHL entry draft. Prior to becoming professional, LaCosta played junior ice hockey with the Wellington Dukes, Owen Sound Attack, and the Barrie Colts.

== Playing career ==
LaCosta received many call-ups from the Columbus Blue Jackets American Hockey League farm team, the Syracuse Crunch. In American Hockey League Syracuse he posted a record in his career overall a total of 40 wins, 42 losses and 7 ties. On February 10, 2009 against the Colorado Avalanche, LaCosta received his first NHL shutout in his second NHL career start for the Columbus Blue Jackets. He was only the 2nd goaltender in Newfoundland And Labrador history to play in the National Hockey League. LaCosta was one of only four players to play in the National Hockey League from the Labrador sector of Newfoundland and Labrador, the others being Darryl Williams (Los Angeles Kings), Pascal Pelletier (Boston Bruins and Chicago Blackhawks), and Chad Penney (Ottawa Senators).

After taking multiple blows to the head in the EIHL with the Cardiff Devils, he was advised by doctors to stop playing hockey due to recurring concussion symptoms, and retired on December 17, 2013.

== Career statistics ==
			Regular season										Playoffs
Season	Team	League	GP	W	L	T	OTL	MIN	GA	SO	GAA	SV%	GP	W	L	MIN	GA	SO	GAA	SV%
2001–02	Wellington Dukes	OPJHL	24	19	2	3	—	1377	44	2	1.92	—	—	—	—	—	—	—	—	—
2002–03	Owen Sound Attack	OHL	28	8	10	3	—	1321	82	0	3.72	.877	1	0	0	—	—	0	2.63	.889
2003–04	Owen Sound Attack	OHL	37	17	10	1	—	1810	82	4	2.72	.909	—	—	—	—	—	—	—	—
2004–05	Owen Sound Attack	OHL	25	15	7	2	—	1423	70	0	2.95	.895	—	—	—	—	—	—	—	—
2004–05	Barrie Colts	OHL	21	10	5	2	—	1054	48	1	2.73	.911	5	1	2	215	11	0	3.07	.908
2005–06	Barrie Colts	OHL	59	36	17	—	0	3340	142	6	2.55	.915	11	5	2	654	34	0	3.12	.896
2006–07	Syracuse Crunch	AHL	19	5	7	—	1	852	40	3	2.82	.894	—	—	—	—	—	—	—	—
2006–07	Dayton Bombers	ECHL	10	3	5	—	1	556	32	0	3.45	.874	—	—	—	—	—	—	—	—
2007–08	Columbus Blue Jackets	NHL	1	0	0	—	0	14	0	0	0.00	1.000	—	—	—	—	—	—	—	—
2007–08	Syracuse Crunch	AHL	15	9	2	—	3	848	30	1	2.12	.932	—	—	—	—	—	—	—	—
2007–08	Elmira Jackals	ECHL	14	7	4	—	1	754	27	0	2.15	.932	—	—	—	—	—	—	—	—
2008–09	Columbus Blue Jackets	NHL	3	2	0	—	0	156	4	1	1.54	.950	—	—	—	—	—	—	—	—
2008–09	Syracuse Crunch	AHL	45	19	18	—	2	2469	115	2	2.79	.910	—	—	—	—	—	—	—	—
2009–10	Syracuse Crunch	AHL	26	7	15	—	1	1362	90	1	3.96	.882	—	—	—	—	—	—	—	—
2011–12	University of New Brunswick	CIS	15	8	4	—	0	747	31	0	2.49	.898	1	—	—	—	0	—	0.00	1.000
2012–13	University of New Brunswick	CIS	16	—	—	—	—	—	—	—	1.92	.917	7	—	—	—	—	—	1.76	.927
2013–14	Cardiff Devils	EIHL	17	7	8	—	1	979	43	1	2.64	.908	—	—	—	—	—	—	—	—
NHL totals			4	2	0	—	0	169	4	1	1.42	.953	—	—	—	—	—	—	—	—
