= Nikolas Brouillard =

Canadian ice hockey player (born 1995)

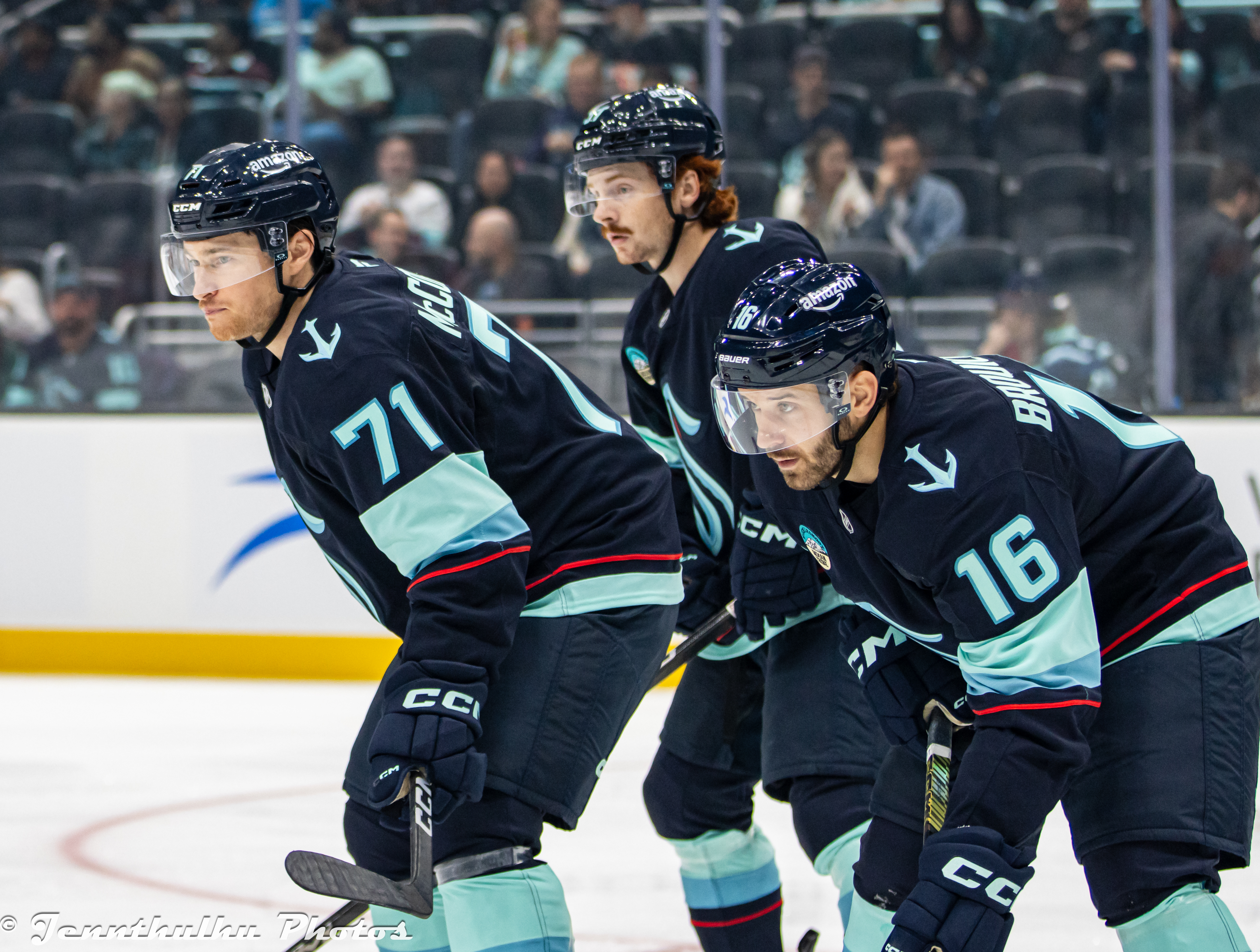
- Brouillard (right) with the Seattle Kraken in 2024
- Born: February 7, 1995 (age 31) Saint-Hyacinthe, Quebec, Canada
- Height: 5 ft 10 in (178 cm)
- Weight: 172 lb (78 kg; 12 st 4 lb)
- Position: Defenceman
- Shoots: Left
- SHL team: Djurgårdens IF
- Playing career: 2016–present

Nikolas Brouillard (Note: French pronunciation: [nikola bʁujaʁ]) (born February 7, 1995) is a Canadian professional ice hockey player who is a defenceman for the Djurgårdens IF of the Swedish Hockey League (SHL).

A native of Quebec, Brouillard played hockey locally in the Quebec Junior Hockey League until 2011, when he was selected by the Drummondville Voltigeurs in the 2011 Quebec Major Junior Hockey League (QMJHL) entry draft. After three years with the team, he was traded to the Quebec Remparts, and midway through the 2015–16 season, he was traded to the Rouyn-Noranda Huskies. That season, Brouillard and the Huskies won the President's Cup as QMJHL champions. Throughout his entire QMJHL career, Brouillard attended many National Hockey League (NHL) development camps, but was never selected in the NHL entry draft. Brouillard signed his first professional contract in 2016, with the AHL's Toronto Marlies. During the 2016–17 season, he spent most of his time with the Marlies' ECHL affiliate, the Orlando Solar Bears, playing only one game with the Marlies.

For the 2017–18 season, Brouillard took the collegiate route, joining the McGill Redmen of U Sports. In his third and final year with the team, he was named the U Sports defenceman of the year. He then signed with the San Diego Gulls in 2021, and he remained with the team for three seasons, before signing with the NHL's New York Rangers. During the 2023–24 season, Brouillard only played with the Rangers' AHL affiliate, the Hartford Wolf Pack. For the 2024–25 season, he signed with the Seattle Kraken, but once again, he only played in he NHL, this time with the Coachella Valley Firebirds. In 2025, he rejoined the Gulls for the 2025–26 season.

== Playing career ==
=== Junior ===
==== Early career ====
Brouillard is a native of Saint-Hyacinthe, Quebec, and he played junior hockey locally with the Collège Antoine-Girouard Gaulois of the Quebec Junior Hockey League, recording three goals and 19 assists for 22 points in 43 games during the 2010–11 season. On June 4, 2011, Brouillard was selected by the Drummondville Voltigeurs in the fourth round of the 2011 Quebec Major Junior Hockey League (QMJHL) entry draft.

==== Major junior ====
On August 15, Brouillard was named to the Voltigeurs' training camp. While he was originally supposed to return to the Gaulois, his level of play was so surprising that on August 30, he was named to the Voltigeurs' roster to start the 2011–12 season. Brouillard played his first game in the QMJHL on September 9, in a 3–2 loss to the Baie-Comeau Drakkar. He tallied his first QMJHL points the next day, assisting on two goals by his brother, Marc-Olivier Brouillard in a 7–6 defeat at the hands of the Chicoutimi Saguenéens. On September 24, he recorded one goal and two assists in a 6–0 victory over the Blainville-Boisbriand Armada. Through the first 30 games of the season, he notched 15 points. He finished the season with two goals and 23 assists in 61 games. His performance landed him a spot on the QMJHL's 2011–12 All-Rookie Team, and to be named the Voltigeurs' rookie of the year. During the 2012 QMJHL playoffs, he played in four games.

On February 15, 2013, during the 2012–13 season, Brouillard scored a hat-trick, notching three goals and an assist in a 5–4 loss to the Rouyn-Noranda Huskies. Through 68 games, Brouillard totaled 14 goals and 43 assists for 57 points. During the 2013 QMJHL playoffs, he scored two goals in five games. During His performance led him to be ranked 99th among North American skaters by the NHL Central Scouting Bureau prior to the 2013 NHL entry draft. Despite this, Brouillard was not selected in the draft, but he was invited to the Montreal Canadiens' development camp in July. He was then invited to the San Jose Sharks' rookie camp in September, playing in a Young Stars Tournament exhibition game on September 6. During the 2013–14 season, Brouillard recorded a career-high 10-game point streak from December 7, 2013, to January 8, 2014, He finished the season with 12 goals and 49 assists for 61 points through 68 games. He achieved three assists in 11 games of the 2014 QMJHL playoffs.

On May 30, 2014, Brouillard was traded to the Quebec Remparts in exchange for a first-round pick in the QMJHL entry draft. On September 10, he was invited to the Winnipeg Jets' rookie camp, and he was returned to the Remparts on September 16 to start the 2014–15 season. On October 5, Brouillard scored the overtime game-winning goal in a 5–4 win over the Chicoutimi Saguenéens. Later, he was named the 2nd Star of the Week for the week of October 27 after registering four points in three games. On February 17, 2015, Brouillard recorded another hat trick, helping the Remparts to a 6–4 win against the Baie-Comeau Drakkar. Through 61 games, he put up 17 goals and 40 assists for 57 points. On April 2, during the 2015 QMJHL playoffs, he tallied three assists in a 6–5 victory over the Cape Breton Screaming Eagles. During the playoffs, the Remparts reached the President's cup finals, losing in game seven in double overtime to the Rimouski Océanic, with Brouillard having the only Quebec goal in the 2–1 loss. He finished the playoffs with three goals and 12 assists in 22 postseason games.

On September 17, 2015, Brouillard was named an alternate captain of the Remparts. Prior to the start of the 2015–16 season, he attended the Toronto Maple Leafs' rookie camp, in which he suffered an injury. In his return to play on October 28, he picked up his first three points of the season. Brouillard scored his third career hat trick on November 3, contributing to an 8–4 win over the Victoriaville Tigres. Just five days later, he recorded another hat trick, also tallying three assists in the same night for a total of six points in a 10–6 victory against the Cape Breton Screaming Eagles. On December 28, Brouillard was traded to the Rouyn-Noranda Huskies in exchange for Alexandre Sills and three QMJHL entry draft picks. On January 21, 2016, he put up four assists in an 8–4 defeat of the Halifax Mooseheads. In 31 games with the Huskies, Brouillard totaled five goals and 22 assists. During the 2016 QMJHL playoffs, Brouillard notched five goals and 15 assists in 19 games to help the Huskies win the President's Cup. On May 27, in the semifinals of the 2016 Memorial Cup, Brouillard scored in a 3–1 win over the Red Deer Rebels. The next day, in the final, the London Knights beat the Huskies 3–2 in overtime to win the Cup.

==== First professional stint ====
On June 7, 2016, Brouillard signed a contract with the Toronto Maple Leafs' American Hockey League (AHL) affiliate, the Toronto Marlies. He joined the Maple Leafs' training camp in September, and on October 8, he was assigned to the Marlies. On October 21, before playing a game with the Marlies, he was assigned to the team's ECHL affiliate, the Orlando Solar Bears. He made his ECHL debut the next day, tallying his first professional goal and assist in a 3–2 loss to the Florida Everblades. On November 1, he put up a four-point night in a 6–2 victory against the South Carolina Stingrays. Through the first 37 games of the season, Brouillard recorded seven goals and 14 assists for 21 points, leading Orlando defencemen. On January 23, 2017, he was called up to the Marlies. He made his AHL debut on January 25, tallying three shots on goal in a 2–1 win over the Rochester Americans. He was reassigned to the Solar Bears the next day. With the Solar Bears, he finished the 2016–17 season with the same 21 points in 39 games.

=== Collegiate ===
After his first professional opportunity, Brouillard joined the McGill Redmen of U Sports starting from the 2017–18 season. In order to be eligible to play in U Sports, he had to wait a year after playing his last professional game. Brouillard made his U Sports debut on January 31, 2018, also picking up his first collegiate assist in a 4–3 victory over the UQTR Patriotes. His first collegiate goal came in the next game on February 3 as the overtime winner to defeat the Ontario Tech Ridgebacks 4–3. In the game after that on February 9, the last game of the regular season, he recorded two goals and one assist in a 4–3 shootout loss to the Concordia Stingers, bringing his totals for his first collegiate season up to three goals and two assists in three games. After helping win the Queen's Cup as Ontario University Athletics (OUA) champions but losing to Saskatchewan at the 2018 U Sports University Cup, Brouillard finished the playoffs two goals and seven assists in 10 playoff games.

In an exhibition game before the 2018–19 season, Brouillard tallied two goals and an assist in a 5–4 overtime loss to the UNB Reds on September 14, 2018. During the regular season, he had two-goal games in a 7–5 loss to the Laurentian Voyageurs on October 20, and in a 2–1 victory over the Western Mustangs on October 27. He finished the regular season with 12 goals and nine assists through 26 games. During the OUA playoffs, he recorded one goal and three assists in five games. On November 15, 2019, during the 2019–20 season, Brouillard collected two goals and two points in a 4–3 overtime win over the Ontario Tech Ridgebacks. On November 29, he notched two goals and an assist in a 4–3 overtime defeat of the Carleton Ravens. Brouillard finished the regular season with seven goals and 16 assists through 28 games, leading him to be named OUA Defenceman of the Year. Brouillard was then named U Sports Defenceman of the Year as well as earning him a spot on the First All-Canadian Team. During the OUA playoffs, he totaled two assists in three games.

=== Professional ===
==== San Diego Gulls ====
On January 11, 2021, Brouillard signed a one-year contract with the AHL's San Diego Gulls. On March 3, during the 2020–21 season, he recorded his first AHL point, an assist, on the game-winning overtime goal by Chase De Leo in a 5–4 win over the Ontario Reign. On March 26, he scored his first two AHL goals in a 4–1 win over the Bakersfield Condors. Brouillard finished his first AHL season with three goals and 11 assists through 29 games. During the 2021 Pacific Division playoffs, Brouillard recorded one assist in three games.

On July 15, 2021, the Gulls signed Brouillard to a one-year contract extension. In September, Brouillard attended the training camp of the Gulls' NHL affiliate, the Anaheim Ducks, and on October 4, he was reassigned by the Ducks to San Diego. On October 15, he was named to San Diego's opening roster for the 2021–22 season. On November 13, he recorded his fifth point in his previous five games. On January 15, 2022, in a 4–3 win over the Abbotsford Canucks, Brouillard fought with Danila Klimovich with under a minute remaining in the third period. On March 16, Brouillard tallied two goals and an assist in a 6–1 victory against the Henderson Silver Knights. Two days later, Brouillard scored a shorthanded goal in a 3–1 defeat of the Silver Knights. In 66 games that season, Brouillard scored 13 goals, tied for first place in the AHL among defencemen, and collected 26 assists for 39 points. During the 2022 Calder Cup playoffs, he totaled two assists in two games. Brouillard re-signed with the Gulls on October 13, 2022, for the 2022–23 season. The next day, in the Gulls' season opener against the Grand Rapids Griffins, he notched a goal and two assists in a 6–2 win. On December 14, Brouillard recorded a career-high four assists in a 5–4 loss to the Abbotsford Canucks. Through all 72 games that season, Brouillard notched six goals and 33 assists.

==== New York Rangers and Seattle Kraken organizations ====
On July 1, 2023, Brouillard signed a one-year contract with the New York Rangers, his first NHL contract. After being named to the Rangers' training camp on September 19, he was assigned to their AHL affiliate, the Hartford Wolf Pack, on September 24 to start the 2023–24 season. On October 21, he recorded his first assist and first goal with the Wolf Pack, an assist in a 5–1 win over the Lehigh Valley Phantoms, the Wolf Pack's 1000th win as a franchise. Brouillard finished the season with five goals and 31 assists in 70 games. During the 2024 Calder Cup playoffs, he put up two assists in 10 games.

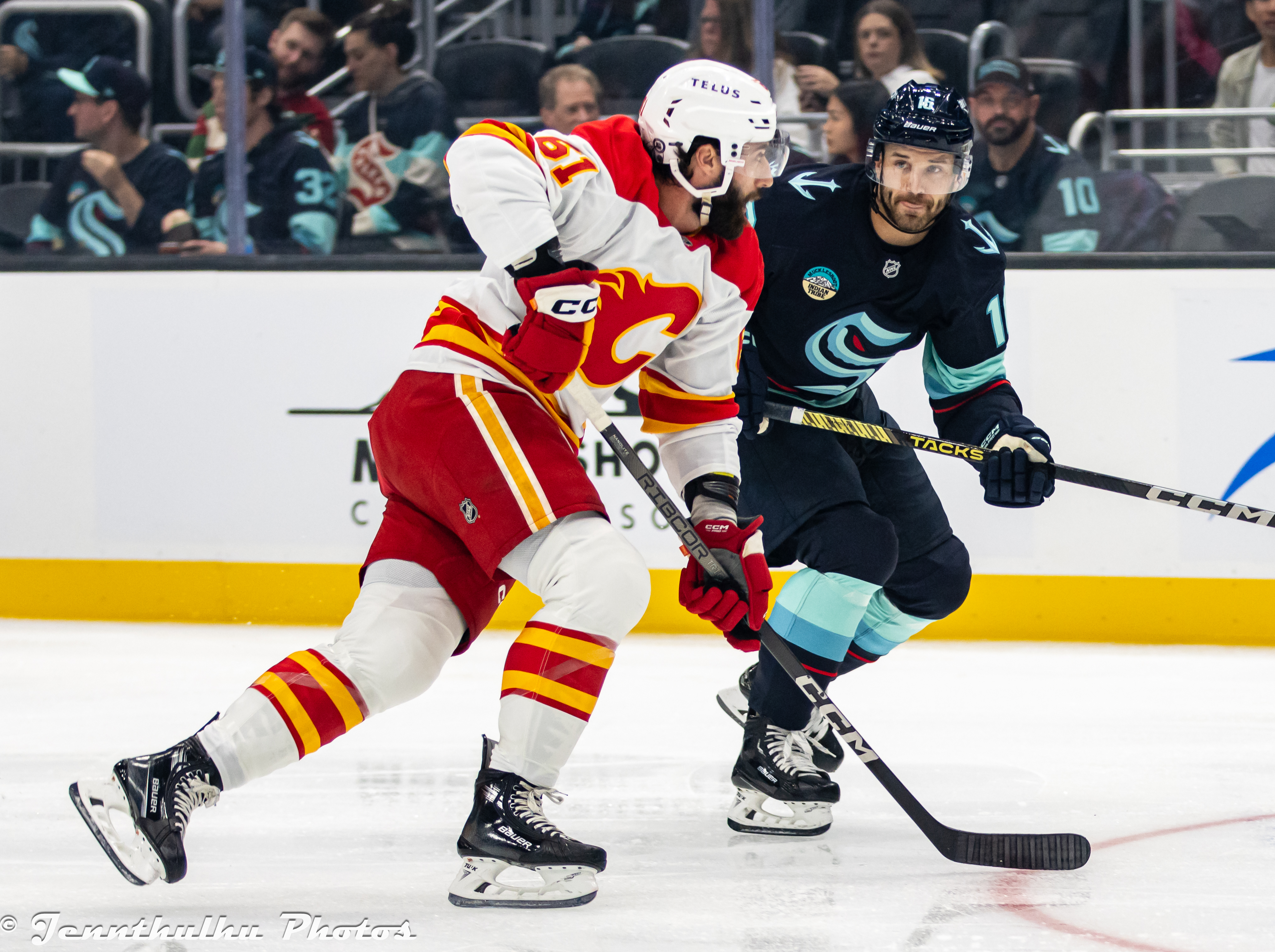
Brouillard (right) with the Kraken during a preseason game in September 2024

On July 1, 2024, Brouillard signed a one-year contract with the Seattle Kraken. After participating in the Kraken's training camp, he was assigned to the Coachella Valley Firebirds, their AHL affiliate, on September 27, 2024, to start the 2024–25 season. He earned his first point with the Firebirds on October 18, assisting on a goal in a 6–5 victory over his former team, the San Diego Gulls. On November 26, Brouillard scored his first goal with the Firebirds and then recorded three assists in an 8–2 win over the Tucson Roadrunners. On April 5, Brouillard scored two goals in the first period of a 3–1 victory against the Henderson Silver Knights. Through 69 games that season, Brouillard totaled seven goals and 31 assists. During the 2025 Calder Cup playoffs, he tallied one assist in six games.

==== Return to San Diego ====
On July 2, 2025, Brouillard signed a one-year contract with his former team, the San Diego Gulls. On December 12, he became the first Gulls player to record 100 career points with the team, doing so in a 4–1 win over the Henderson Silver Knights. Brouillard surpassed Brandon Montour for most goals as a defenceman in Gulls history on March 7, 2026, in a 6–4 victory over the Rockford IceHogs. He played his record 229th game with the Gulls on April 9 in a 5–2 win against the San Jose Barracuda. He finished the 2025–26 season with four goals and 20 assists in 67 games. During the 2026 Calder Cup playoffs, he tallied one assist in two games.

==== Djurgårdens IF ====
On July 8, 2026, Brouillard signed a one-year contract with Swedish Hockey League (SHL) club Djurgårdens IF, ending a run of six consecutive seasons in the AHL.

== Career statistics ==
=== Regular season and playoffs ===
			Regular season					Playoffs
Season	Team	League	GP	G	A	Pts	PIM	GP	G	A	Pts	PIM
2011–12	Drummondville Voltigeurs	QMJHL	61	2	23	25	24	4	0	0	0	2
2012–13	Drummondville Voltigeurs	QMJHL	68	14	43	57	49	5	2	0	2	15
2013–14	Drummondville Voltigeurs	QMJHL	68	12	49	61	86	11	0	3	3	10
2014–15	Quebec Remparts	QMJHL	61	14	40	57	100	22	3	12	15	24
2015–16	Quebec Remparts	QMJHL	23	12	20	32	22	—	—	—	—	—
2015–16	Rouyn-Noranda Huskies	QMJHL	31	5	22	27	41	19	5	15	20	32
2016–17	Toronto Marlies	AHL	1	0	0	0	0	—	—	—	—	—
2016–17	Orlando Solar Bears	ECHL	39	7	14	21	62	—	—	—	—	—
2017–18	McGill University	U Sports	3	3	2	5	4	10	2	7	9	6
2018–19	McGill University	U Sports	26	12	9	21	71	5	1	3	4	4
2019–20	McGill University	U Sports	28	7	16	23	28	3	0	2	2	6
2020–21	San Diego Gulls	AHL	29	3	11	14	28	3	0	1	1	2
2021–22	San Diego Gulls	AHL	66	13	26	39	131	2	0	2	2	0
2022–23	San Diego Gulls	AHL	72	6	33	39	120	—	—	—	—	—
2023–24	Hartford Wolf Pack	AHL	70	5	31	36	137	10	0	2	2	10
2024–25	Coachella Valley Firebirds	AHL	69	7	31	38	55	6	0	1	1	5
2025–26	San Diego Gulls	AHL	67	4	20	24	59	2	0	1	1	6
AHL totals			374	38	152	190	530	23	0	7	7	24
