= Canada Games Stadium =

Stadium in Saint John, New Brunswick, Canada

Coordinates: 45.304647°N 66.087511°W

- Interactive map of Canada Games Stadium
- Location: 100 Tucker Park Road; Saint John, New Brunswick
- Owner: University of New Brunswick
- Capacity: 5,000
- Surface: Natural Grass; Rubberized 400m track

Construction
- Opened: 1985

Tenants
- UNB Saint John Seawolves (CCAA, AFL)

Canada Games Stadium is a multi-purpose, fully lit stadium in Saint John, New Brunswick. It was built on the campus of UNB Saint John for the 1985 Canada Summer Games and has a seating capacity of 5,000 spectators. It hosts the UNB Saint John Seawolves men's and women's soccer teams, and football team.

Canada Games Stadium features a 400m synthetic Tartan track, as well as separate areas for long jump/triple jump, high jump, pole vault, discus, hammer, shot put, and javelin. Inside the track is a synthetic turf soccer/football field.

== History ==
In 2009 the stadium received $3.6 million in upgrades, including resurfacing the track, placing synthetic turf on the infield, the creation of an area for throwing events, grand stand renovations, infield lighting installation, a scoreboard, security lighting and perimeter fencing, and a new storage area.

Besides hosting university and minor sports, the Canada Games Stadium has hosted national track & field events; international soccer matches (including matches during the 1987 FIFA U-16 World Championship), and two CFL pre-season football games (with temporary seating added) in 1986 and 1987.

In 2012, the stadium hosted the NCCWMA & CMA Masters Track & Field Championships. The University of New Brunswick, Saint John hosted the 2013 CCAA Men's National Soccer Championships.
