= Daine Todd =

Canadian ice hockey player

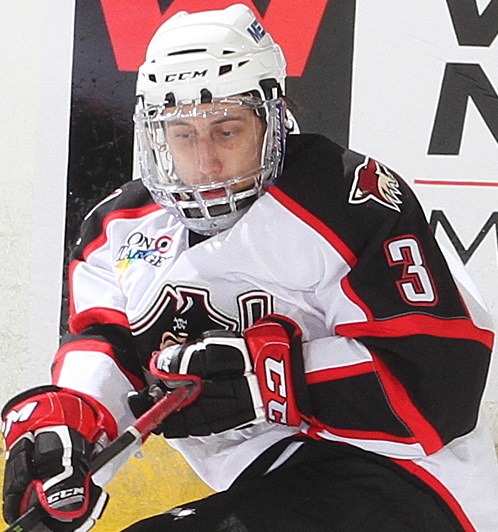
- Todd with the Portland Pirates in 2013
- Born: January 10, 1987 (age 39) Red Deer, Alberta, Canada
- Height: 5 ft 10 in (178 cm)
- Weight: 176 lb (80 kg; 12 st 8 lb)
- Position: Defence
- Shoots: Right
- ICEHL team Former teams: Black Wings Linz; Texas Stars; Portland Pirates; Jokerit; Luleå HF; Örebro HK; Iserlohn Roosters; Sheffield Steelers
- NHL draft: Undrafted
- Playing career: 2013–present

Daine Todd (born January 10, 1987) is a Canadian professional ice hockey defenceman for Steinbach Black Wings Linz of the ICE Hockey League (ICEHL).

== Playing career ==
=== Amateur ===
Todd won the Western Hockey League titles with the Medicine Hat Tigers in 2004 and 2007 and competed in the 2004 Memorial Cup and 2007 Memorial Cup.

Todd attended the University of New Brunswick from 2009 to 2013 and won the 2011 and 2013 CIS University Cup for the UNB Varsity Reds.

=== Professional ===
Coming out of college, Todd played two games with the Texas Stars of the American Hockey League (AHL) in 2013. He spent the 2013-14 season with AHL's Portland Pirates, followed by two seasons with Jokerit of the Kontinental Hockey League (KHL). On June 1, 2016, he signed a deal with Luleå HF of the Swedish Hockey League (SHL).

On May 30, 2018, Todd left Sweden after two seasons and signed a one-year deal with German outfit, the Iserlohn Roosters of the Deutsche Eishockey Liga (DEL).

After an injury plagued 2019–20 season with Iserlohn, posting just 1 goal in 16 games, Todd agreed to mutually terminate the remaining year of his contract with the Roosters on November 29, 2020.

In August 2021, it was confirmed Todd had agreed terms with EIHL side Sheffield Steelers ahead of the 2021-22 season.

In September 2022, Todd moved to Austrian club Steinbach Black Wings Linz.
