= 1980 CIAU Men's Soccer Championship =

The 1980 CIAU Men's Soccer Championship was hosted by the University of New Brunswick. The UNB Red Shirts won the gold medal game against the Wilfrid Laurier Golden Hawks to claim the first men's soccer national championship in school history.

== All-Canadians ==
First Team(1-11) and Second Team(12-22) with school and hometown. Note: Flags indicate national team as defined under FIFA eligibility rules; some limited exceptions apply. Players may hold more than one non-FIFA nationality.

No.	Pos.	Nation	Player
1	GK	(Canada) CAN	Eric Jones (UBC - hometown)
2	DF	(France) FRA	Marvin Chehowy (Calgary)
3	DF	(Canada) CAN	Scott Fraser (Wilfrid Laurier)
4	DF	(Canada) CAN	Dennis Ford (Lakehead)
5	MF	(Canada) CAN	Glenn McNamara (York)
6	MF	(Canada) CAN	Stuart Miller (Guelph)
7	MF	(Canada) CAN	Brian Decaire (McGill)
8	GK	(Canada) CAN	David Harding (UNB)
9	FW	(Canada) CAN	Geoff Agastini (Saint Mary's)
10	FW	(Canada) CAN	Ross Webb (Saint Mary's)
11	FW	(Canada) CAN	Frank Woods (Victoria)

No.	Pos.	Nation	Player
12	GK	(Canada) CAN	Rudy Bartholomew (Alberta)
13	DF	(Canada) CAN	Doug MacDonald (Brock)
14	DF	(Canada) CAN	Paul Scholz (Wilfrid Laurier)
15	DF	(Canada) CAN	Gordon Johnson (UBC)
16	MF	(France) FRA	Kevin McGurick (McMaster)
17	MF	(Canada) CAN	John Evans (Dalhousie)
18	MF	(Canada) CAN	Jim Takats (McGill)
19	FW	(Canada) CAN	Vladi Greco (McMaster)
20	FW	(Canada) CAN	Len Visconti (Toronto)
21	FW	(Canada) CAN	Ebenezer Dania (UNB)
22	FW	(Canada) CAN	John Dunwoody (Calgary)

== Nationals ==
Semi-final

UNB Red Shirts	3-0	McGill Redmen

Final

UNB Red Shirts	3-1	Wilfrid Laurier Golden Hawks
