= Colby Pridham =

Canadian ice hockey player

- Born: August 7, 1987 (age 37); O'Leary, PEI, CAN
- Height: 5 ft 11 in (180 cm)
- Weight: 176 lb (80 kg; 12 st 8 lb)
- Position: Left wing
- Shoots: Left
- CHL team: Fort Worth Brahmas
- NHL draft: Undrafted
- Playing career: 2013–present

Colby Pridham (born August 7, 1987) is a Canadian professional ice hockey player.

Pridham played five seasons (2008 – 2013) of Canadian college hockey in the Atlantic University Sport (AUS) conference of Canadian Interuniversity Sport (CIS). Pridham's outstanding play was recognized when he was named to the 2012-13 AUS First All-Star Team.

On March 28, 2013, the Fort Worth Brahmas of the CHL signed Pridham to an amateur try-out agreement, and he played three games with the Brahmas during the 2012–13 CHL playoffs.

== Awards and honours ==
Award	Year
AUS First All-Star Team	2012-13
