= Marc-André Dorion =

Canadian ice hockey player

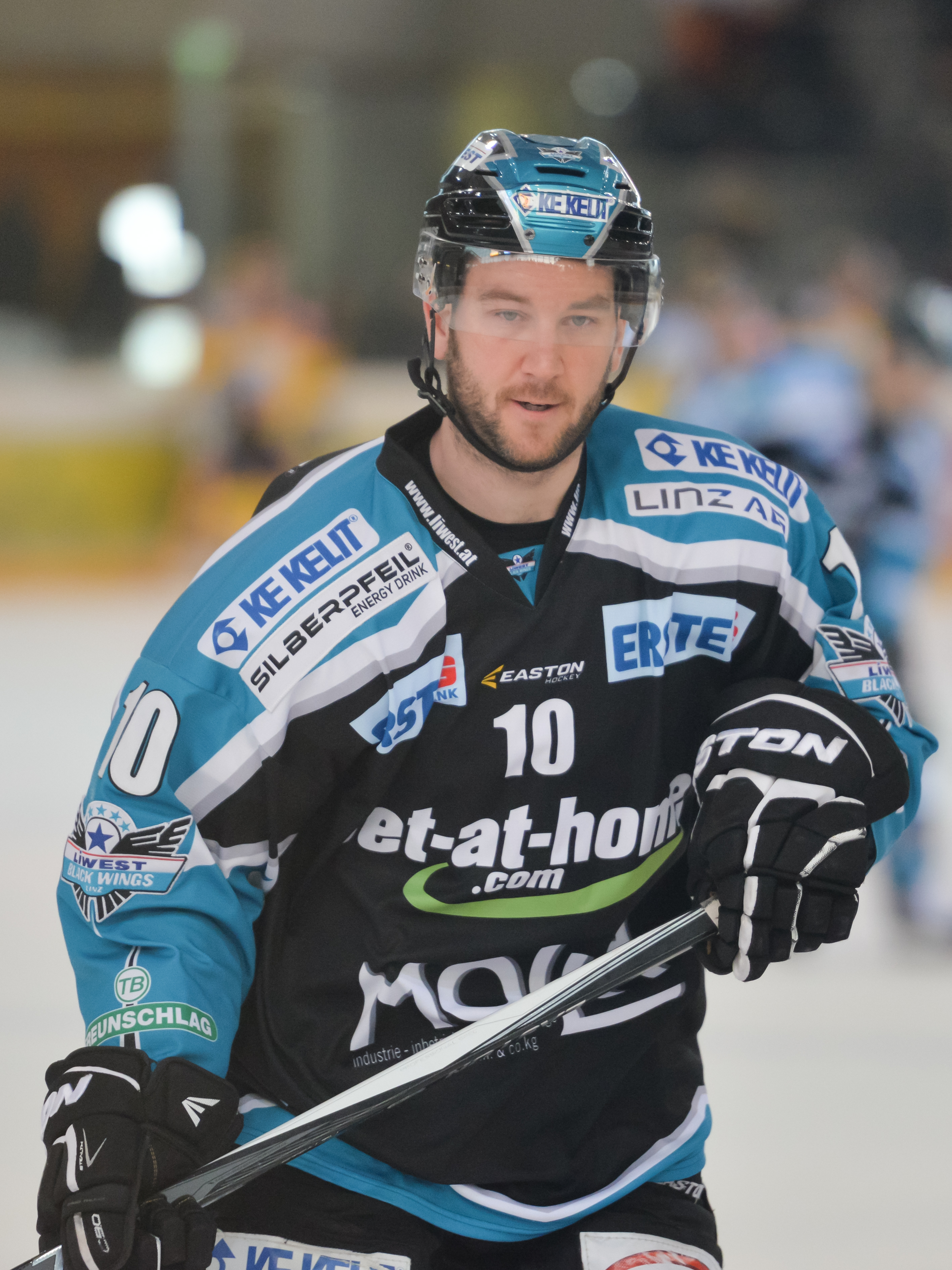
- Born: March 30, 1987 (age 37); Saint-Hubert, Quebec, Canada
- Height: 5 ft 11 in (180 cm)
- Weight: 185 lb (84 kg; 13 st 3 lb)
- Position: Defence
- Shoots: Right
- ICEHL team Former teams: Black Wings Linz; Vienna Capitals; Dragons de Rouen
- NHL draft: Undrafted
- Playing career: 2012–present

Marc-André Dorion (born March 30, 1987) is a Canadian professional ice hockey defenceman. He is currently playing with Black Wings Linz in the ICE Hockey League (ICEHL).

== Playing career ==
Dorion played five seasons (2003–2008) in the Quebec Major Junior Hockey League (QMJHL) and was named to the QMJHL First All-Star Team for the 2007–08 QMJHL season. He went on to play four seasons of Canadian College hockey (2008–2012) with McGill University in the Quebec Student Sport Federation of Canadian Interuniversity Sport (CIS) where he graduated as McGill's all-time top-scoring defenceman with 192 points in 174 games.

For his outstanding play he was named three times to the CIS All-Canadian First Team (2009–10, 2010–11, and 2011–12) and was twice named CIS Defenceman of the Year (2009–10 and 2011–12).

After playing the first six seasons of his professional career with EHC Black Wings Linz, Dorion signed a one-year contract to continue in the EBEL with the Vienna Capitals on May 27, 2018.

== Awards and honours ==
Award	Year
QMJHL First All-Star Team	2007–08
CIS First-Team All-Canadian	2009–10
CIS Defenceman of the Year	2009–10
CIS First-Team All-Canadian	2010–11
CIS First-Team All-Canadian	2011–12
CIS Defenceman of the Year	2011–12
