= Dean Ouellet =

Canadian ice hockey player (born 1987)

- Born: August 5, 1987 (age 38) Edmundston, New Brunswick, Canada
- Height: 5 ft 11 in (180 cm)
- Weight: 172 lb (78 kg; 12 st 4 lb)
- Position: Centre
- Shoots: Left
- LNAH team Former teams: Rivière-du-Loup 3L; Hamilton Bulldogs; Arystan Temirtau; Lions de Lyon
- NHL draft: Undrafted
- Playing career: 2012–present

Dean Ouellet (born August 5, 1987) is a Canadian professional ice hockey forward currently with Rivière-du-Loup 3L of the LNAH.

== Playing career ==
Ouellet played four seasons (2004–2008) of major junior hockey in the Quebec Major Junior Hockey League with the Cape Breton Screaming Eagles. He then attended the University of Moncton where he played four seasons (2008–2012) of CIS college hockey in the AUS conference. In his fourth year, Ouellet was recognized for his outstanding play when he was named to the AUS First All-Star Team.

On September 12, 2012, Ouellet signed with the San Francisco Bulls of ECHL, and he made team history when, on October 12, 2012, he scored the very first goal for the new ECHL team in their very first regular season game. The rookie was selected by his team their representative in the 2012–13 ECHL All-Star Game.

On June 21, 2013, as an impending free agent Ouellet joined former Bulls teammate, Jordan Morrison in signing a one-year contract abroad in the Kazakhstan Hockey Championship with Arystan Temirtau. However, on October 2, 2013, before the start of the 2013–14 ECHL season, both Morrison and Ouellet were able to come to terms with the San Francisco Bulls and returned to the team.

On January 27, 2014, the San Francisco Bulls announced they were ceasing operations effective immediately, leaving Ouellet and all players on an ECHL contract with San Francisco as free agents. He then signed for the remainder of the season with the Fort Wayne Komets.

After a full season abroad in the French Ligue Magnus with LHC Les Lions, Ouellet returned to the ECHL and signed for the 2015–16 season with the Fort Wayne Komets on June 16, 2015. Ouellet was limited to 8 games with the Komets due to injury before he was traded to fellow ECHL club, the Norfolk Admirals on January 5, 2016.

== Career statistics ==
=== Regular season and playoffs ===
			Regular season					Playoffs
Season	Team	League	GP	G	A	Pts	PIM	GP	G	A	Pts	PIM
2004–05	Cape Breton Screaming Eagles	QMJHL	55	7	24	31	37	5	2	2	4	4
2005–06	Cape Breton Screaming Eagles	QMJHL	55	17	28	45	83	9	0	4	4	8
2006–07	Cape Breton Screaming Eagles	QMJHL	70	40	45	85	115	16	9	10	19	18
2007–08	Cape Breton Screaming Eagles	QMJHL	70	43	54	97	57	11	4	11	15	18
2008–09	University of Moncton	AUS	27	7	23	30	18	—	—	—	—	—
2009–10	University of Moncton	AUS	26	6	18	24	24	—	—	—	—	—
2010–11	University of Moncton	AUS	28	13	17	30	52	—	—	—	—	—
2011–12	University of Moncton	AUS	28	6	28	34	10	—	—	—	—	—
2012–13	San Francisco Bulls	ECHL	66	24	28	52	75	5	3	3	6	6
2012–13	Hamilton Bulldogs	AHL	5	0	0	0	2	—	—	—	—	—
2013–14	Arystan Temirtau	KHC	4	1	0	1	4	—	—	—	—	—
2013–14	San Francisco Bulls	ECHL	38	10	20	30	24	—	—	—	—	—
2013–14	Fort Wayne Komets	ECHL	16	1	9	10	8	9	4	2	6	4
2014–15	Lions de Lyon	FRA	26	11	10	21	32	—	—	—	—	—
2015–16	Fort Wayne Komets	ECHL	8	2	3	5	4	—	—	—	—	—
2015–16	Norfolk Admirals	ECHL	32	5	7	12	21	—	—	—	—	—
AHL totals			5	0	0	0	2	—	—	—	—	—

=== International ===
Year	Team	Event	Result	GP	G	A	Pts	PIM
2004	Canada Atlantic	U17	6th	5	3	1	4	0
Junior totals				5	3	1	4	0

== Awards and honours ==
Award	Year
AUS First All-Star Team	2011–12
AUS Most Sportsmanlike Player	2011–12
CIS All-Canadian Second Team	2011–12
ECHL All-Star Game	2012–13
