= Atlantic Collegiate Athletic Association =

Governing body for collegiate sports in Atlantic Canada

- Founded: 1967; 59 years ago
- No. of teams: 10
- Website: www.acaa.ca

The Atlantic Collegiate Athletic Association (ACAA; French: Association atlantique du Sport collégial) is the governing body for collegiate sports in Atlantic Canada. Founded in 1967 as the Nova Scotia College Conference, the ACAA is represented by ten schools in New Brunswick, Nova Scotia and Prince Edward Island competing in seven sports.

The ACAA is a member of the Canadian Collegiate Athletic Association, and conference champions compete for national collegiate titles.

== Schools ==
- Crandall University Chargers in Moncton, NB
- Holland College Hurricanes in Charlottetown, PE
- Mount Allison University Mounties in Sackville, NB
- Mount Saint Vincent University Mystics in Halifax, NS
- Nova Scotia Agricultural College Rams in Truro, NS
- St. Thomas University Tommies in Fredericton, NB
- University of King's College Blue Devils in Halifax, NS
- UNB Saint John Seawolves in Saint John, NB
- Dragons de l'Université Sainte-Anne in Pointe-de-l'Église, NS
- UNB Fredericton Reds in Fredericton, NB (as affiliate member for Women's Rugby)

== Sports ==
- Badminton
- Basketball
- Cross Country
- Golf
- Rugby
- Soccer
- Volleyball

ACAA Staff

- Executive Director: Tamara Stephen
- Marketing and Communications Coordinator: Brittanny Lowe

ACAA Executive Committee

- President: Albert Roche, Holland College
- VP Eligibility: Andrew Harding, Dalhousie Agricultural Campus
- VP Finance: June Lumsden, Mount Saint Vincent University
- VP SAFA: Michael Eagles, St. Thomas University
- VP Marketing: Neil Hooper, University of King's College
- VP Equity, Diversity, Inclusion: Jacques Bellefleur, Mount Allison University
- CCAA Director: Neil Hooper, University of King's College

ACAA Sport Convenors

- Golf: Albert Roche, Holland College
- Women's Rugby: Michael Eagles, St. Thomas University
- Soccer: Jim Druart, Crandall University
- Cross-Country Running: Andrew Dobson, Holland College
- Badminton: Andrew Harding, Dalhousie Agricultural Campus
- Volleyball: Angela Barrett-Jewers, Mount St. Vincent University
- Basketball: Natasha Kelly, UNB Saint John

ACAA Athletic Directors

- Crandall University Chargers; Jaderson Cordeiro
- Dalhousie Agricultural College; Andrew Harding
- Holland College Hurricanes; Adam Smith
- Mount Allison University Mounties; Lindsey MacIntosh
- Mount St. Vincent University Mystics; Angela Barrett-Jewers
- St. Thomas University Tommies; Meaghan Donahue Wies
- University of King's College Blue Devils; Matthew Bartley
- University of New Brunswick Reds; John Richard
- UNB-Saint John Seawolves; Natasha Kelly
- Universite Sainte-Anne Dragons; Marc-Alexandre Lagacy

== See also ==
- Canadian Collegiate Athletic Association
