= Holland College =

Community college in Prince Edward Island, Canada

Coordinates: 46°14′21″N 63°07′18″W

- Collège Holland
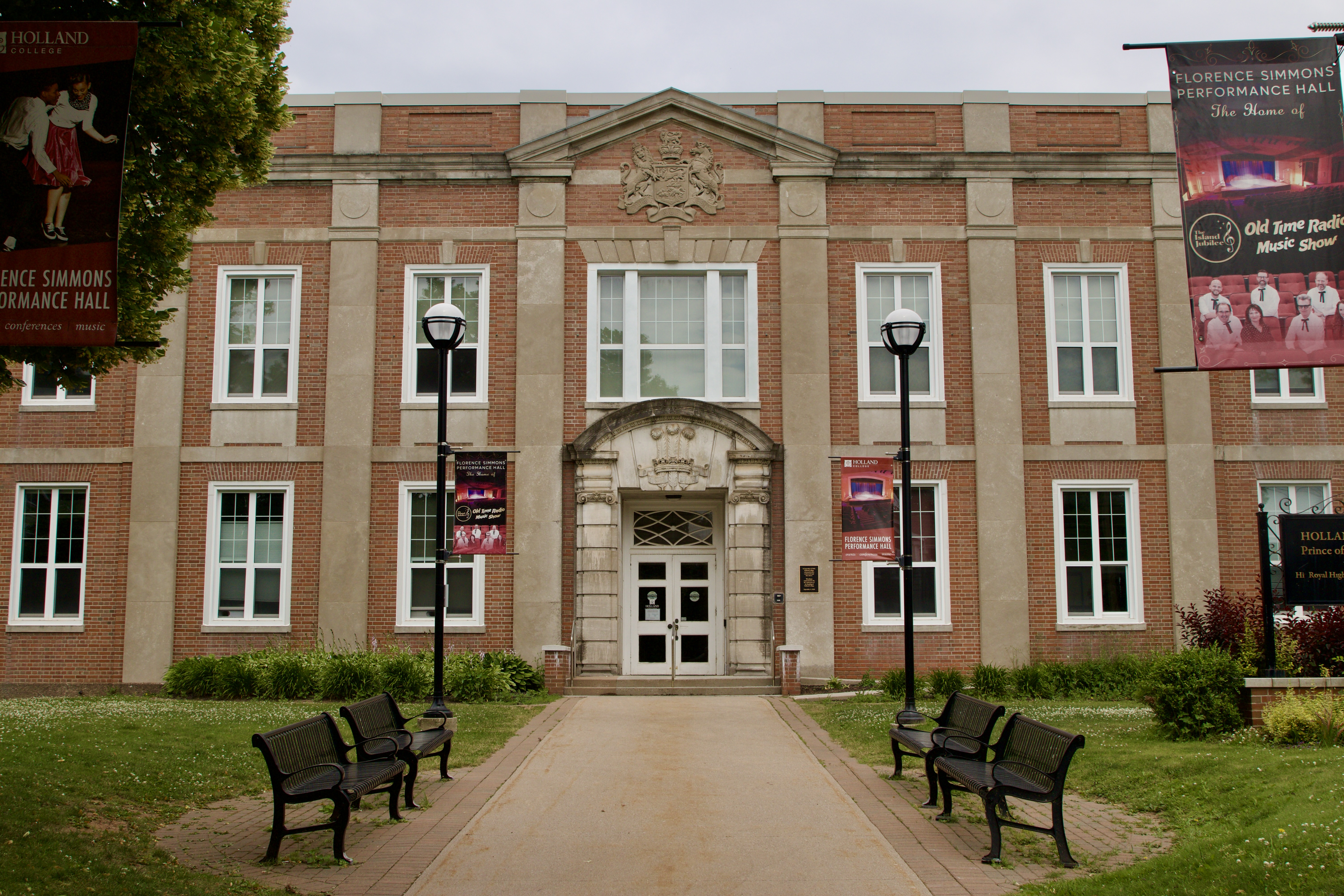
- Entrance at 140 Weymouth St, location of Florence Simmons Performance Hall
- Motto: "'You'll Make It Here!'"
- Type: Public community college
- Established: September 2, 1969; 57 years ago
- Accreditation: ACCC, AUCC, CBIE
- President: Natalie Mitton
- Students: 2,626 FTE (2021)
- Location: Prince Edward Island, Canada
- Campus: List; Charlottetown Prince of Wales Campus Tourism and Culinary Centre Belmont Centre; Summerside Summerside Waterfront Campus Atlantic Police Academy Marine Training Centre; Alberton West Prince Campus; Three Rivers Georgetown Centre
- Colours: Maroon & Red
- Nickname: Holland Hurricanes
- Sporting affiliations: CCAA – ACAA
- Website: www.hollandcollege.com

Holland College is the provincial community college for the Canadian province of Prince Edward Island (PEI). It is named after the British Army engineer and surveyor Captain Samuel Holland. In 2024, about 30% of the college's enrolled students were from outside of Canada.

== History ==
It was formed by the Government of Prince Edward Island, then led by Premier Alex Campbell, in 1969 as a result of an education reform policy undertaken as part of the Prince Edward Island Comprehensive Development Plan, which saw the merging of the province's two post-secondary institutions previously structured along religious lines – Catholic-owned St. Dunstan's University and public but majority-Protestant Prince of Wales College – to become the nondenominational University of Prince Edward Island (UPEI). The site of the former Prince of Wales College at 140 Weymouth St. became a newly established provincial vocational institution, named Holland College.

When it first opened, the college originally offered just four programs, with 83 students attending. In 1971, it started offering public safety training with the launch of the Atlantic Police Academy at its new campus in Slemon Park, Summerside (on the former site of CFB Summerside). In 1983, the college expanded further to open The Culinary Institute of Canada in Charlottetown on the former site of the Charlottetown Hospital on Haviland Street. In 2004, the college added Athletics and Recreational programs and launched its athletic teams under the name "Holland Hurricanes". The Hurricanes joined the Atlantic Collegiate Athletic Association in 2006 and have 11 competitive teams.

Over the years, the college has continued to expand to offer industry-aligned training, applied research, and support the economic development of Prince Edward Island. Holland College also offers government funded Adult Education and English Language training courses.

It is estimated that over 40,000 students have attended the college, through full or part-time education. The college is now known as one of Canada's top 50 research colleges, sitting 12th in the lasted ranking.

In 2026, the college installed Natalie Mitton as its first female president & CEO. Her term began on 2 July 2026.

== Campuses ==
=== Charlottetown ===
- Prince of Wales Campus (main campus)
- Belmont Centre (English language training)
- Tourism and Culinary Centre (Home of the Culinary Institute of Canada)

=== Alberton ===
- West Prince Campus

=== Summerside ===
- Summerside Waterfront Campus
- Atlantic Police Academy, Slemon Park
- Marine Training Centre

=== Three Rivers ===
- Georgetown Centre

== Programs ==
Holland College offers more than 50 full time career-focused programs, along with specialized training through its Atlantic Police Academy and Marine Training Centres.

== Scholarships ==
The college offers over $700,000 in scholarships and bursaries for eligible students. The government of Prince Edward Island also offers significant funding sources for post-secondary students. See also

== See also ==
- Higher education in Prince Edward Island
