= UNB Reds =

University of New Brunswick athletic teams

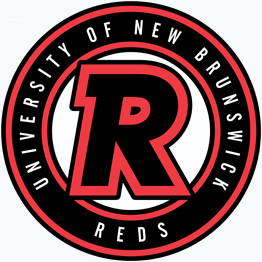
- University: University of New Brunswick
- Nickname: Reds
- Association: U Sports
- Conference: Atlantic University Sport
- Athletic director: John Richard
- Location: Fredericton, New Brunswick
- Varsity teams: 18 (9 men's, 9 women's)
- Basketball arena: Richard J. Currie Center
- Ice hockey arena: Aitken University Centre
- Soccer stadium: BMO Centre
- Aquatics center: Sir Max Aitken Pool
- Volleyball arena: Richard J. Currie Center
- Colours: Red and Black
- Website: goredsgo.ca/landing/index

The UNB REDS are the athletic teams that represent the University of New Brunswick in Fredericton, New Brunswick, Canada.

The UNB REDS compete in a variety of sports, including men's and women's basketball, ice hockey, soccer, and volleyball. Additionally, the athletic program encompasses swimming, track and field, cross country running, and curling for both men and women.

== History ==
The name "Varsity Reds" was only adopted circa 1993. They are now named the "REDS" as of 2018. Prior to 1993, every varsity sport, including football, hockey, women's basketball, men's basketball and men's wrestling had a different name: the REDS, Red Bombers, Red Devils, Red Bloomers, Red Raiders, and Black Bears, respectively.

== Varsity sports ==
| Men's sports | Women's sports |
|---|---|
| Basketball | Basketball |
| Cross country | Cross country |
| Curling | Curling |
| Ice hockey | Ice hockey |
| Soccer | Soccer |
| Swimming | Swimming |
| Track and field | Track and field |
| Volleyball | Volleyball |
| Wrestling | Wrestling |

=== Curling ===
The UNB men's and women's curling teams compete annually at the Atlantic University Sport Curling Championships. In 2015, the men's team led by skip Josh Barry won the inaugural event. In 2024, the women's team led by skip Jenna Campbell captured the first women's curling title in program history. In 2025, the men's team competed in the 2025 New Brunswick Tankard.

=== Men's hockey ===
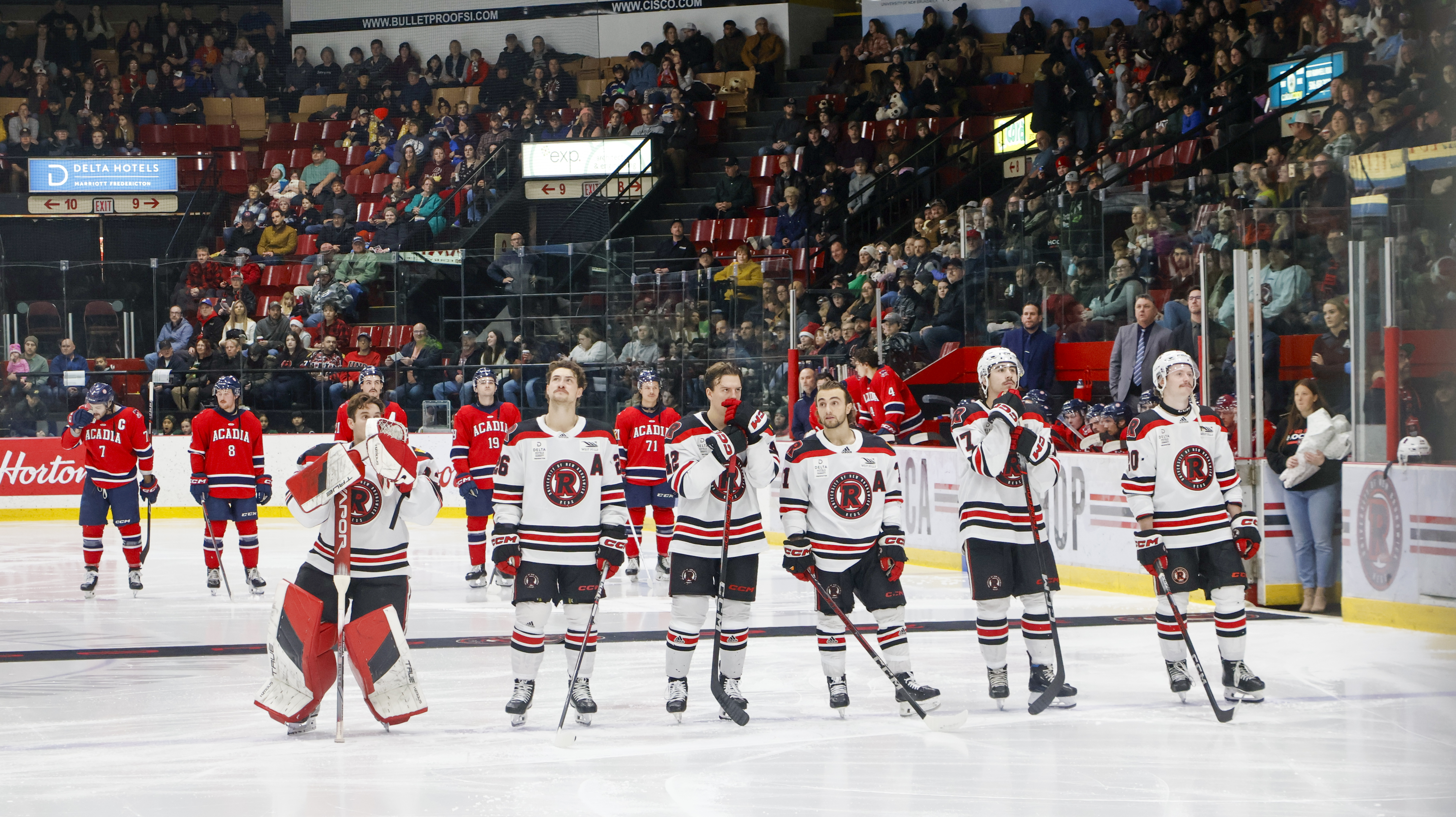
UNB Reds Mens Hockey 2024

The University of New Brunswick's men's hockey program can trace its lineage back to 1880 and was an inaugural member of the Maritime Intercollegiate Hockey League in 1906. Then known as the Red'n Black. The team made their first appearance in the national tournament in 1964 (only the second year it was held) where they lost to the Alberta Golden Bears, but defeated the Montreal Carabins to win a bronze medal. UNB, under The Varsity Reds banner, won a silver medal in 1997 and then won their first national championship the following year, in 1998, by defeating the Acadia Axemen by a score of 6–3.

The REDS men's hockey team has appeared in 15 gold medal games and has won ten national championships, most recently in 2024. The University of New Brunswick has hosted the national tournament six times and the team has won two titles on home ice. The Reds have also won 20 AUS conference championship banners, including three in a row on two separate occasions, between 2018–2020 and 2022–2024 respectively.

- Lesley Reddon was part of the 1994–95 UNB team and became the first female goaltender to play in the men's Atlantic Universities Hockey Conference, and possibly in U Sports.
- UNB and the St. Thomas Tommies had a fierce rivalry in men's ice hockey. These games, known as the "Battle of the Hill" were among the most heavily anticipated and attended despite UNB winning them on a regular basis.

=== Women's Hockey ===
The Reds women's ice hockey program made a return as a varsity team for the 2018–19 season. The team had been downgraded to a club team after the 2007–2008 season, but after a lengthy legal battle, was reinstated.

=== Men's soccer ===
Established in 1948 as the "UNB Red Shirts", the team plays their home games at the BMO Centre.

- 2012: Coach Miles Pinsent was named AUS and CIS coach of the year.
- 2014: Captain Alexandre Haiart leads the team to victory at the Atlantic University Sport Championship.

=== Track & Field and Cross Country ===
The UNB Track and Field team was established during the 2011–12 school year. It is the only varsity team composed of athletes from both the UNB Fredericton and the UNB Saint John campuses.

=== Wrestling ===
The UNB wrestling team is known as the Black Bears, and they have produced several CIAU/CIS medals, as well as a record 15 consecutive AUAA titles from 1987 to 2002. The AUAA title was retired in 2002 ending the run of consecutive titles. The team captured back to back CIS Team Silver medals in 2010 and 2011, as well as a team bronze in 2015.

== Club sports ==
=== Baseball ===
The UNB Cougars baseball team competes in the Canadian Intercollegiate Baseball Association.

- 2003 CIBA National Champions (3–0 win over Laval)
- 2007 CIBA National Champions (2–0 win over Concordia Stingers)
- 2008 CIBA National Champions (win over McGill)

=== Cricket ===
In 2005, the UNB Cricket Club organized the initial UNB Cricket Cup, which took place in October. Featuring teams from several Residences on campus, it is believed that it is the first of its kind to take place at UNB. The tournament was won by Harrison House who chased a target of over 150 to beat McLeod by a margin of 1 wicket. All games, of innings comprising 10 overs, took place at Queen's Square Ball Field in Fredericton. The trophy is proudly displayed in the Harrison lounge. In 2007, UNBCC grew to almost 40 members making it arguably the biggest cricket club in the Atlantic Provinces.

=== Fencing ===
The UNB Fencing Club has been in operation since 1966, competing in the Atlantic Fencing League and the Canadian Fencing Federation. Teams from the club have captured the Alfred Knappe Trophy for Maritime Mixed weapon competition 7 times (1973, 1974, 1976, 1977, 1998, 2001 and 2013) as well as the Atlantic University Mixed Weapon Championship in 2009 (one of only two years it was run), defeating Memorial University for the title.

=== Football ===
The UNB Red Bombers football team first began play in 1948 in exhibition play before playing in the first intercollegiate Canadian football game played in New Brunswick in 1949. The program was in continuous operation until it was dropped after the 1980 season, with the school making the announcement in June 1981. In their history, the Red Bombers won two Jewett Trophy conference championships in 1969 and 1970, but lost in the following Atlantic Bowls to the McGill Redmen and Ottawa Gee-Gees respectively.

In 2008, the university made the announcement that the Red Bombers were to be reborn in 2009 in the Atlantic Football League, along with University of New Brunswick Saint John, Dalhouse University, and Holland College. In 2009 (the inaugural season for the Atlantic Football League), the Red Bombers defeated the UNB Saint John Seawolves to capture the first Moosehead Cup championship. The Red Bombers returned to the championship game in 2011, but lost to the Holland Hurricanes. The team returned to the Moosehead Cup the following year and defeated the Hurricanes in the rematch game in 2012. After a five-year absence, the Red Bombers qualified for the 2017 championship game where they defeated the Dalhousie Tigers 39–35 in the highest scoring Moosehead Cup to date. In 2019, the team won their fourth championship after defeating the Hurricanes 29–26. The Red Bombers returned to the championship game in 2021, but were defeated by the Tigers. On September 21, 2024, Ella Lord became the first woman to play in the Atlantic Football League, playing for the Red Bombers.

The team has played in the following leagues: NBFL (1949–1957), MIFL (1958–1959), AFC (1960–1965), MIAA (1966–1968), AIAA (1969–1973), AUAA (1974–1980), and AFL (2009–present)

Championships: 2009, 2012, 2017, 2019, 2023

=== Men's rugby ===
The UNB men's rugby team is known as the Ironmen, and they boast numerous New Brunswick and Maritime championships at the 'A' and 'B' levels of competition.

=== Women's rugby ===
The University of New Brunswick Varsity Reds Women's Rugby established in 2015 claimed the 2015 Atlantic Collegiate Athletic Association women's rugby championship with a 14–5 win over the St. Thomas University Tommies, on 1 November at Scotiabank Park South. Johanna Reid scored the Varsity Reds' lone try, while Julija Rans converted on three penalty goals.

After an undefeated season in 2016, the University of New Brunswick Varsity Reds Women's Rugby once again were the Atlantic Collegiate Athletic Association women's rugby championship with a 24–0 win over the St. Thomas University Tommies, on 5 November.

== National championships ==
| Sport | Competition | Titles | Winning years |
|---|---|---|---|
| Football | Men's Soccer | 1 | 1980 |
| Ice hockey | Men's Ice Hockey | 10 | 1998, 2007, 2009, 2011, 2013, 2016, 2017, 2019, 2023, 2024 |
