= Brent Ladds =

Canadian ice hockey administrator (born 1951)

- Born: 1951 (age 74–75); Noranda, Quebec, Canada
- Education: Loyola College
- Occupation: Ice hockey administrator
- Known for: Canadian Junior Hockey League president; Ontario Hockey Association president

Brent Ladds (born 1951) is a Canadian former ice hockey administrator. He served as president of the Canadian Junior Hockey League (CJHL) from 2016 to 2022, president of the Ontario Hockey Association (OHA) from 1980 to 2012, commissioner of Allan Cup Hockey from 2013 to 2016, and chairman of the Hockey Canada junior hockey council from 2014 to 2016. He marketed the CJHL as a development program for players seeking a professional career or an education, with exposure to National Hockey League talent scouts at the annual CJHL Prospects Game and World Junior A Challenge. He also sought to increase marketing opportunities, have consistent administrative practices, and to co-ordinate public relations across the CJHL. His tenure as president also saw the withdrawal of the British Columbia Hockey League, and subsequent format change of the Centennial Cup tournament to include all nine league champions.

Ladds began working in hockey administration with the OHA in 1975, overseeing its program for on-ice officials. He was appointed secretary-manager of the OHA in 1977, then became the first paid full-time president of the OHA in 1980. When the Ontario Hockey Federation was established in 1989, Ladds was named its executive director. As president, he sought to reduce on-ice violence and penalties in the game, and to eliminate hazing from the OHA. His reforms included lengthier suspensions for misconduct, and education for players and coaches. He envisioned a junior ice hockey league that was more provincial in nature, and to improve the quality of coaching and the player experience. He felt that junior hockey in Ontario needed to be more attractive to players, who were departing the OHA for leagues elsewhere in Canada. From 2006 to 2008, he directed the Canada East team at the World Junior A Challenge, and Ontario's hockey teams at the Canada Games. His administration career was recognized with the OHA Gold Stick Award in 1992, the Hockey Canada Order of Merit in 1997, and the President's Award from the Ontario Hockey Federation in 2012.

== Early life ==
Ladds was born in 1951, (Note: Ladds's birth year was deduced by process of elimination based on the following: Ladds was 26 years old as of July 6, 1977. (born in 1950 or 1951); Ladds was 60 years old as of May 17, 2012. (born in 1951 or 1952)) in Noranda, Quebec. He grew up playing minor ice hockey in Quebec, before attending Loyola College in Montreal. As a goaltender, he played collegiate hockey, then later in the OHA Senior A League for the Orillia Terriers.

== Ontario Hockey Association ==
Ladds joined the Ontario Hockey Association (OHA) in 1975, to oversee its program for on-ice officials. When he began working for the OHA, he and David Branch were the only two office staff. On July 6, 1977, he was appointed secretary-manager of the OHA to succeed Branch. The OHA had only five staff members including Ladds as of 1977. When assuming the new role, Ladds sought advice from former OHA executives on handling hockey matters, and worked with WeirFoulds LLP on legal matters.

During the 1978–79 season, the OHA suspended 31 players for attacking on-ice officials. Ladds was faced with complaints from officials that the suspensions were too short, and demands for more protection since officials had no appeal process for the suspensions. Ladds felt that 31 attacks was not bad considering the number of games assigned, and noted that officials had representation on the OHA referee committee.

=== 1980 to 1989 ===
Ladds was appointed president of the OHA on April 28, 1980, after a restructuring from an elected president into an elected chairman and an appointed president. He was to focus on the increasing business demands on the OHA, fundraising and publicity, and be a technical co-ordinator. Ladds became the first paid full-time president of the OHA.

In March 1982, Ladds gave a five-season suspension to a player for striking and threatening referees. It was the lengthiest suspension given within 30 years, which Ladds justified since the player was a repeat offender. Later in the same month when a player was ejected from a game for fighting and threatening a referee, Ladds initially gave a suspension for the remainder of the season followed by probation for the next season. Ladds later agreed to reduce the suspension to eight games combined with time served by the player as a referee for minor ice hockey, as an experimental alternative to a lengthy suspension.

When the Ontario Hockey League (OHL) split from the OHA in July 1982, Ladds felt they might compete for the same players. The OHA and OHL disagreed on financial terms of affiliation, then the OHL decided to handle its own administration. The OHA told referees that they could not work for both organizations, which was later reversed by Ladds who felt that it was unfair for the referees. Ladds and the OHL later reached an interim affiliation agreement, which allowed the OHL to compete at the Memorial Cup.

In 1982, Ladds sought to increase publicity for the Northern Ontario Hockey Association (NOHA), and arranged for a feature in The Hockey News by co-ordinating contributions by its member leagues. Later in the year, he oversaw establishment and publication of OHA Hockey News as a house organ.

The J. Ross Robertson Cup was the championship trophy of the OHA Senior A Hockey League, and subsequently for Allan Cup Hockey.

The OHA Senior A Hockey League ceased operations after the 1986–87 season, when it was reduced to three teams and the OHA was unable to find new teams. Ladds felt that the league had become cost-prohibitive, and noted the need to cut costs and restructure senior ice hockey to compete for the Allan Cup.

In 1986, Ladds suspended the Brantford Classics for one season from the Greater Ontario Junior Hockey League due to excessive on-ice violence, and since their team's "objectives are not consistent with ours". In 1987, the Port Elgin Bears withdrew from a Western Ontario Junior C Hockey League playoffs series due to perceived on-ice violence by the Hanover Barons. Ladds and the OHA investigated the incident, which received national publicity when Port Elgin's coach was supported by Otto Jelinek, the Canadian Minister of State for Fitness and Amateur Sport. Port Elgin team officials were given one-year suspensions when the OHA found no evidence to justify abandoning the series. Ladds felt that the OHA had a responsibility to enforce player safety when justified, and agreed to study controlling on-ice violence. In the 1987–88 season, Ladds suspended a player for life who struck an opponent in the head with a hockey stick.

During the summer in 1989, the Metro Toronto Hockey League (MTHL) and the Ontario Minor Hockey Association (OMHA), broke away from the OHA and formed the Central Canada Hockey Association, due to disagreement with an OHA restructuring proposal which would have limited their voting powers. The dispute ended when the Ontario Hockey Federation (OHF) was established, with equal representation for the OHA, NOHA, MTHL, and OMHA. Ladds was named executive director of the OHF, which was given the mandate to oversee hockey in Ontario, and be a review panel for three years to propose further restructuring if necessary.

=== 1990 to 1999 ===
Ladds and the OHA established bursaries as of the 1995–96 season, to counter the loss of players to scholarships in the United States. The OHA awarded the bursaries to students chosen to attend the University of Windsor, University of Waterloo, and Wilfrid Laurier University.

When 13 people from the Tilbury Hawks were charged with sex-related crimes in 1994, Ladds sought to eliminate hazing from the OHA and suspended the team's officials for one year. In 1997, parents of players on the Kingsville Comets spoke out against hazing and campaigned for its end. Ladds felt that the OHA must educate its teams and players annually on acceptable practices, in order to prevent incidents and change future behaviour. Ladds subsequently published handbooks given to players annually which covered hazing, alcohol, drug use, tobacco, and sexual harassment. He also required each team to have a youth worker serving as a prevention services co-ordinator. The OHA then requested that the Canadian Amateur Hockey Association (CAHA) include the education in coaching certification programs, and for it to be available to all hockey administrators.

The Metro Junior A Hockey League (MetJHL) operated independent from the OHA as of the 1995–96 season, when it was opposed to a ruling by the CAHA which gave jurisdiction over junior ice hockey in the province to the OHA. Ladds hoped to negotiate a settlement despite that several teams departed the MetJHL to join the Ontario Provincial Junior A Hockey League (OPJHL) which was affiliated with the OHA. Ladds sought for the MetJHL and OPJHL to compete at an equal level within the OHA, whereas the MetJHL insisted on its own administration and was opposed to paying fees to the OHA. The MetJHL rejoined the OHA in 1997, then merged into the OPJHL in 1998.

Ladds wanted to establish a junior hockey league that was more provincial in nature, rather than several local leagues within Ontario. He proposed merging the two tier-2 junior A leagues, and the two junior B leagues, which included 65 teams. He felt that there was little difference in talent between the junior A and B leagues, and that more teams deserved the opportunity to compete for the Royal Bank Cup as national champions. He envisioned a provincial championship for all teams, and to market a program divided into divisions or conferences, similar to the National Collegiate Athletic Association in the United States.

In the 1997–98 season, Ladds sought to reduce on-ice penalties, and planned post-season interviews with the coaches of the most penalized teams to justify their registration as a coach in future seasons. In the same season, the OHA began the practice of linesmen on the ice during warm-ups to prevent pre-game taunting and physical incidents. In the 1998–99 season, Ladds decided that the length of a suspension for any player who injured another would last at least as long as the injury, "in order for him to appreciate the seriousness of his action". Ladds felt that the coaches and players needed to take responsibility for their actions, and they denied the need end brawling in hockey. He stated that the suspension was a trend of lengthier punishments driven by public outcry, and that hockey administrators moved towards marketing a non-violent game.

=== 2000 to 2012 ===
In 2000, Ladds served as chairman of the bid committee for Hamilton and Kitchener to host the 2003 World Junior Ice Hockey Championships. In 2001, Ladds appointed Vern Stenlund as the OHA's first "master mentor coach", to improve the quality of coaching and the player experience in junior hockey.

When the World Junior A Challenge was established in 2006, Ladds felt that it gave exposure to junior hockey and could serve as source of players for the Canada men's national junior team. From 2006 to 2008, he was the director of operations for the Canada East team at the World Junior A Challenge, which won two silver medals and a bronze medal. He held the same role for Ontario's hockey teams at the Canada Games, which won gold and silver medals in consecutive events.

When Major League Hockey merged with the Eastern Ontario Senior Hockey League in 2008, Ladds felt it was needed to maintain well-run OHA franchises. He hoped for senior hockey return to regenerate after the AAA-level had shrunk to only five teams. Ladds stated that his most difficult experience as president was the death of Don Sanderson, who sustained an on-ice head injury while playing for the Whitby Dunlops in 2009. The OHA subsequently debated its rules for wearing hockey helmets, and Ladds argued for them to be properly worn and securely fastened.

Ladds led the study "Tomorrow's Game" to help OHA teams manage their finances and volunteers, which began in 2006 as a survey of teams and leagues to assess priorities and gather recommendations. The study also proposed restructuring junior hockey as of the 2010–11 season, which would have reclassified teams from A to D levels, into a premier league and two developmental leagues. Teams in the proposed premier league would have been required to employ a full-time coach, doctor, nutritionist, and athletic trainers. Ladds felt that junior hockey in Ontario needed to be more attractive to players, who were departing the OHA for leagues elsewhere in Canada.

=== Retirement ===
Ladds retired as OHA president in June 2012. He stated that when he began working for the OHA, he dealt with "three or four bench-clearing brawls [each] weekend", but that culture had changed over time. He felt that the OHA had transitioned into being "a more nimble and responsive organization" than when he began; and was proud of his work to advance player safety and reduce on-ice injuries, which included increased penalties for rough play and certification programs for coaches and referees.

Ladds reflected on his experience with the OHA by stating,

"I didn't know Belle River from Belleville when I first arrived. Hockey has taken me all around Ontario. If I got a flat tire, I could stop in any town in the province and get help from someone I know."

== Allan Cup Hockey and Hockey Canada ==
Ladds served as commissioner of Allan Cup Hockey from 2013 to 2016, overseeing senior hockey in Ontario. He also served as chairman of the Hockey Canada junior hockey council from 2014 to 2016, and as chairman of the 2016 Royal Bank Cup organizing committee.

== Canadian Junior Hockey League ==
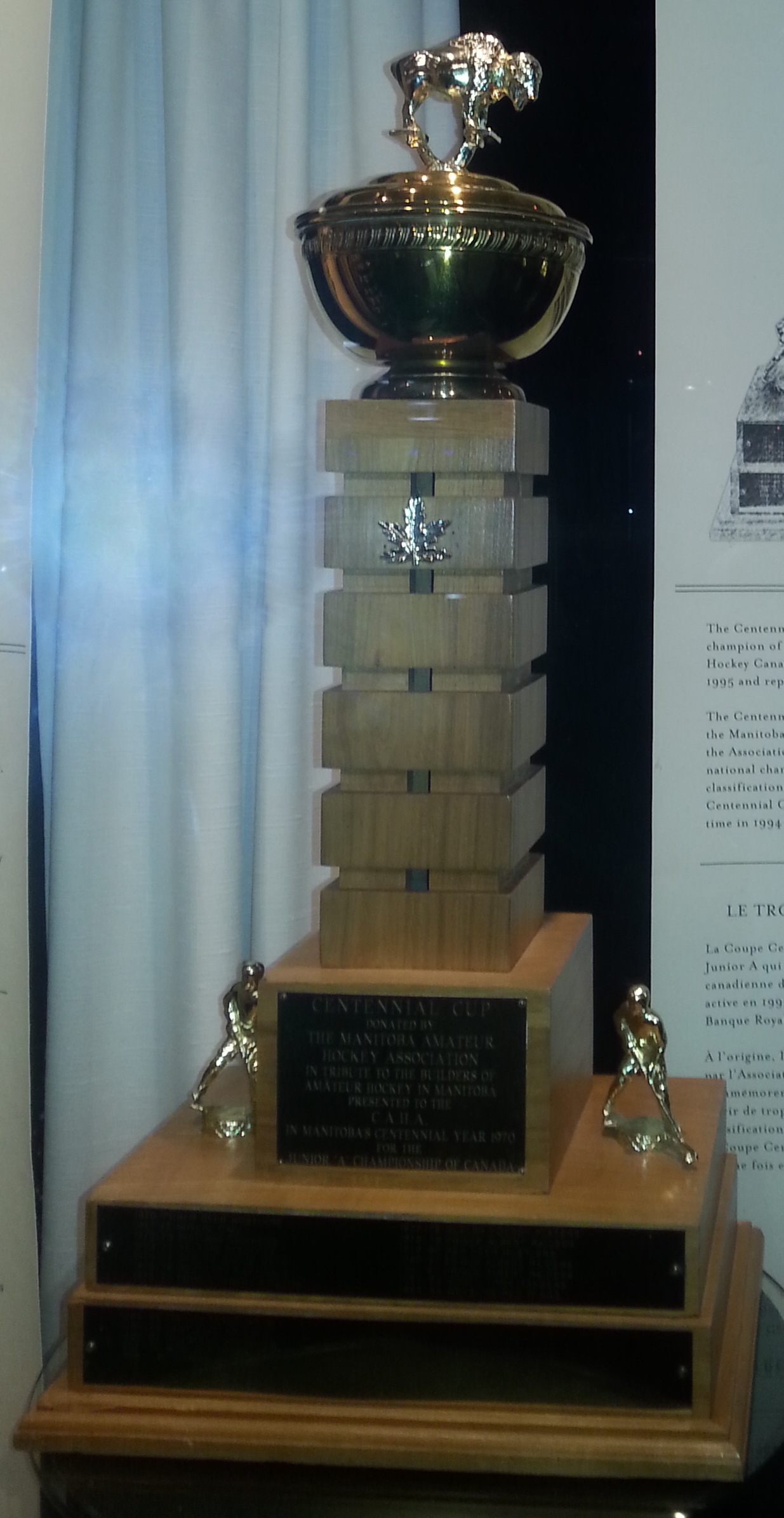
The Centennial Cup (formerly the Royal Bank Cup) is the championship trophy of the Canadian Junior Hockey League.

The Canadian Junior Hockey League (CJHL) named Ladds its president as of September 27, 2016, while it looked to restructure its administration to assist the chairman of the board. He was tasked with overseeing all administration, events, planning and corporate partnerships. Ladds succeeded Rick Morocco who had been the executive director since 2014. Ladds stated that his goals included increasing marketing opportunities, and to have consistent administrative practices among the ten constituent leagues of the CJHL. He has sought to co-ordinate public relations across the CJHL, and oversaw a diversity and inclusion committee to update terms of reference.

When Ladds became president, he wanted the CJHL to improve its position as a development program for players seeking a professional career or an education. Four years later, he felt that the CJHL had "become a program of destination", because of the increasing number of players graduating to professional hockey. He felt that the annual CJHL Prospects Game and the World Junior A Challenge both generated exposure and opportunity for the players, due to the number of National Hockey League (NHL) talent scouts who attend the events.

In 2018, Ladds introduced a concussion protocol for the CJHL funded by the Co-operators, for the assessment and management of concussion, and digitally tracking a player's concussion history. He later developed a player safety committee to implement educational videos for players, and for uniform ice hockey rules in the constituent leagues of the CJHL.

During the COVID-19 pandemic in Canada, Ladds cancelled the 2019–20 season playoffs for all leagues, the four regional championships, and the Centennial Cup national championship. He worked on several return-to-play scenarios for the 2020–21 season, which included staggered registrations and different opening dates for each league. Due to the pandemic, some leagues in the CJHL played games without spectators in attendance with greatly reduced income. Ladds hoped that the financial assistance given by provincial governments in Alberta and Saskatchewan would be equalled by other provinces. Without national hockey events, some CJHL leagues planned showcases for players to be scouted. Ladds worked with the NHL Central Scouting Bureau to make long-term plans for the NHL entry draft.

The British Columbia Hockey League (BCHL) withdrew from the CJHL prior to the 2021–22 season. The BCHL reportedly sought to import players aged 16 and 17 from other provinces, which was opposed by the remainder of the CJHL. Despite the loss of a league, Ladds reiterated that the other nine league were committed to the CJHL. In planning for the next Centennial Cup, Ladds considered a format change since no team from British Columbia would compete against an Alberta team for the Doyle Cup and a berth in the national championship.

In 2021, Ladds stated that all CJHL leagues agreed to truth and reconciliation games in support of First Nations in Canada. He praised the Dryden Ice Dogs for being the first team to arrange such a game, and hoped for more to follow. The 2022 Centennial Cup saw a format change into a 10-team event, which included the host Estevan Bruins, and the nine league champions. The CJHL chose not to have the four regional championships, and gave each league champion a berth in the Centennial Cup.

Ladds retired as president of the CJHL during the 2022–23 season, succeeded by Andy Harkness in November 2022.

== Honours and awards ==
Ladds received the OHA Gold Stick Award in 1992, an order of merit given for service to hockey by a non-player. He received the Hockey Canada Order of Merit in 1997, for contributions to hockey at the national level. He received the President's Award from the Ontario Hockey Federation in 2012, for contributions to hockey in Ontario.

== Personal life ==
Ladds was married by age 25, and was a partner in a carpet-laying business prior to working for the OHA. He resided in Georgetown, Ontario, as of 1997. He later lived in Toronto, then moved to Calgary, to be closer to family in 2014. After retiring from the OHA, Ladds helped operate his family's trout farm.

== Sources ==
- Young, Scott (1989). 100 Years of Dropping the Puck. Toronto, Ontario: McClelland & Stewart. pp. 255–257, 296. ISBN 0-7710-9093-5.
