= Whitby Dunlops =

Canadian senior ice hockey team

Whitby Dunlops

City:
Whitby, Ontario
League:
Allan Cup Hockey
Founded:
1954 (Original)
2004 (Revived)
Folded:
2020
Home Arena:
Iroquois Park
Home Arena
(Original Era):
Whitby Community Arena
Colours:
Red, White, Black & Gold
Head Coach:
Ian Young
General Manager:
Ian Young

The Whitby Dunlops were a Canadian senior ice hockey team in the Allan Cup Hockey league. The team began play in 2004, and is on a leave of absence as of the 2020–21 season.

Two previous teams have also played as the Whitby Dunlops. The first played in the OHA Senior A League from 1954 to 1960, winners of the 1958 World Ice Hockey Championships. The second was a junior ice hockey team for the 1962–63 season.

== Original Dunlops ==
The original Whitby Dunlops were founded from the remnants of the former Oshawa Generals junior team of 1952–53. After the Hambly Arena fire destroyed the Generals home ice, the team was disbanded and some of the older players on the team along with coach and manager Wren Blair, became the Oshawa Truckmen and operated from Bowmanville, Ontario for the 1953–54 season.

In 1954, the Oshawa Truckmen were relocated to Whitby and were temporarily known as the Whitby Seniors, playing out of the Whitby Community Arena. The team was soon sponsored by the Dunlop Rubber Company, and renamed the Whitby Dunlops. The team started as a Senior B team, winning its division the first year. The following year the Dunlops moved up to the OHA Senior A League. The Dunlops won the J. Ross Robertson Cup as league champions in 1957 and 1959.

This Senior A team would go on to win two Allan Cups, the Canadian Senior Hockey Championship, in 1957 and 1959. Their 1957 win earned them the right to represent Canada at the 1958 World Ice Hockey Championships, where they won the World Championship. Notable members of the team are, former Whitby mayor Bob Attersley, former Toronto Maple Leafs captain Sid Smith and Boston Bruins president Harry Sinden. Harry Sinden was captain of the 1958 Dunlops, while former Leaf captain Sid Smith was a playing coach. The Town of Whitby honoured this team for their achievements with their induction into the Whitby Sports Hall of Fame.

As Canada's representative to the 1958 World Championships, the team took an ocean liner to the championships in Norway because team manager Wren Blair was terrified of flying. Everyone was sick for six days because of the rough waters but the chance to restore Canada's pride was worth it. After a 14-game exhibition tour of Europe the Dunlops competed at the World Championships in Oslo, Norway.

It was a traumatic time for Canadian hockey. We'd lost at the '56 Olympics and nobody could believe it," recounted Sinden, noting Canada boycotted the 1957 worlds because the Soviets had invaded Hungary. "In 1958, when we finally went, everyone was anxious to get back what was lost. — Wren Blair

The 1958 Whitby Dunlops were inducted into the Ontario Sports Hall of Fame in 1997.

=== Season-by-season results ===
Season	Games	Won	Lost	Tied	Points	Winning Pct. (%)	Goals for	Goals against
1954–55	Data unavailable.							
1955–56	Data unavailable.							
1956–57	52	34	16	2	70	0.673	290	185
1957–58	36	27	6	3	57	0.792	197	116
1958–59	52	33	11	8	74	0.712	254	174
1959–60	54	34	20	0	70	0.630	220	199

== The Junior Dunlops ==
The Senior A Dunlops folded after 1960, and the void in Whitby was filled by the Whitby Mohawks, a junior ice hockey team for the 1960–61 season. The Mohawks played their first season as a Junior B team. After one season, they were promoted to play in the new Metro Junior A League.

In their third season, the Mohawks were renamed the Dunlops. Unlike the previous Senior A version of the Dunlops which descended in part from the Oshawa Generals, the Junior A team played against the revived Oshawa Generals during the 1962–63 season.

Season-by-season results

- Competed in 1960 to 1962 seasons as the Whitby Mohawks.

Season	Games	Won	Lost	Tied	Points	Winning Pct. (%)	Goals for	Goals against
1960–61	Data unavailable.							
1961–62	36	14	20	2	30	0.417	123	170
1962–63	40	11	21	8	30	0.375	167	225

== Current Dunlops ==
The current Dunlops were revived by a group of 31 local business and hockey personalities led by former Bowmanville Eagles owner Mike Laing who became the president. The Dunlops were granted membership in the Ontario Hockey Association's Eastern Ontario Senior Hockey League for the 2004–2005 season. The first revived season for the Dunlops was a success on the ice, finishing second overall in the league with a 25-7-0 record. The team played in the league finals versus the Norwood Vipers losing the series in 6 games. The EOSHL was elevated from AA status to AAA status after the 2004–05 season, becoming eligible to contend for the Allan Cup.

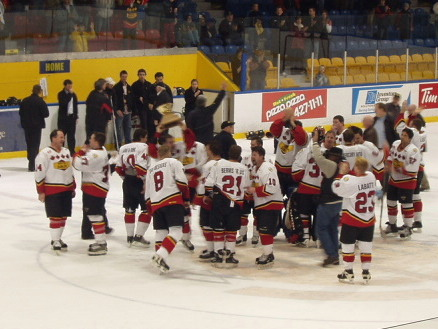
2006 Renwick Cup Champions

In their second year the Dunlops finished in first place in the EOSHL. They prevailed in a rematch versus the Norwood Vipers, winning the league championship in a 6-game series for the Re/Max Upper Canada Realty Cup. The EOSHL champion Dunlops played the Major League Hockey champion Dundas Real McCoys defeating them 3 games to 1 in a best-of-five series for the J. Ross Robertson Cup. The Dunlops hosted the defending Allan Cup champions, Thunder Bay Bombers in a best-of-three series for the Renwick Cup played on three consecutive nights at Iroquois Park. The Dunlops defeated the Bombers 2 games to 1 to win the Renwick Cup and the right to go to the 2006 Allan Cup, in Powell River, British Columbia. After losing their first game, Whitby reached the Allan Cup finals. The Dunlops lost 7–1 in the championship game to the host team, the Powell River Regals.

The Dunlops played their third season with a strong core of returning players to finish first overall in the EOSHL, and sweep through the playoffs defeating the Norwood Vipers in four games for the Re/Max Upper Canada Realty Cup. The Dunlops played the Major League Hockey champions Brantford Blast defeating them in 4 games, for the Robertson Cup. In the Ontario championship, Whitby downed the Kenora Thistles in two straight games to earn a second consecutive berth in the Allan Cup. After a tie in their first game, Whitby reached the Allan Cup finals with three wins in a row. The Dunlops lost 4–3 in the championship game to the Lloydminster Border Kings.

The Dunlops finished first overall in the regular season in the EOSHL. In the playoffs, Whitby defeated the Norwood Vipers 4–1, and the Simcoe County Tundras 4–0 to win the league championship. The Dunlops then defeated the Dundas Real McCoys 4–0 to win the Robertson Cup. This series win guaranteed the Dunlops a third consecutive appearance in the Allan Cup. In the 2008 Allan Cup, Whitby lost twice with one tie game.

The EOSHL folded and the Dunlops joined Major League Hockey.

On December 12, 2008, Dunlops player Don Sanderson fell without his helmet on the ice and struck his head during a fight. He had brain surgery the next day, but died on January 2, 2009. The OHA subsequently debated its rules for wearing hockey helmets, to be properly worn and securely fastened.

The Dunlops lost the MLH final to the Dundas Real McCoys 4-games-to-none.

=== Season-by-season results ===
Note: OL= Overtime loss

Season	Games	Won	Lost	OL	Points	Winning Pct. (%)	Goals for	Goals against
2004–05	32	25	7	0	50	0.781	–––	–––
2005–06	30	25	5	0	50	0.833	219	109
2006–07	28	23	5	0	46	0.821	206	119
2007–08	28	24	3	1	49	0.875	226	117
2008–09	28	18	10	0	36	0.643	154	140
2009–10	24	17	6	1	35	0.729	141	90
2010–11	24	17	3	4	38	0.792	133	98
2011–12	28	21	7	0	42	0.750	160	111
2012–13	24	15	6	3	33	0.688	127	94
2013–14	24	18	5	1	37	0.771	151	80
2014–15	24	16	5	3	35	0.729	155	84
2015–16	24	16	7	1	48	0.667	168	92
2016–17	24	18	6	0	51	0.708	143	106
2017–18	23	14	9	0	38	0.551	122	111

== NHL alumni ==
Listed in chronological order from first season played, with dates in parentheses.

- Harry Sinden (54–55, 55–56, 56–57, 57–58, 58–59, 59–60)
- John Henderson (55–56, 56–57, 57–58, 58–59, 59–60)
- Charlie Burns (56–57, 57–58)
- Connie Broden (57–58)
- Roy Edwards (57–58)
- Wally Maxwell (57–58)
- Sid Smith (57–58, 58–59)
- Pete Babando (58–59, 59–60)
- Bob Hassard (58–59, 59–60)
- Brent Grieve (2004–05, 2005–06)

== Other former players ==
- G Bob Perani (61-62)
