= Marmora Lakers =

- City: Marmora, Ontario
- League: Eastern Ontario Senior Hockey League
- Home arena: Marmora Arena
- Colours: Brown, Yellow, and White
- General manager: Curtis Trimble
- Head coach: Shawn Antoski

Franchise history
- 2003–2006: Belleville Macs
- 2006–2008: Marmora Lakers

The Marmora Lakers were a Senior "AAA" ice hockey team in the Ontario Hockey Association's Eastern Ontario Senior Hockey League from 2003 to 2008, based in Marmora, Ontario, Canada. The team was coached by Shawn Antoski and managed by Curtis Trimble.

== History ==
The Macs were based out of Belleville, Ontario, playing home games at the Yardmen Arena. They moved to Marmora in 2006 to better accommodate the EOSHL who were down to only four teams.

The Macs originally use the name of an earlier senior hockey team, the Belleville McFarlands, during the first seasons of play.

After two seasons in Marmora, the EOSHL merged with Major League Hockey to create the Major Hockey League. The small town Lakers chose not to pursue the high travel new league.

== Season-by-season standings ==
Season	GP	W	L	T	OTL	GF	GA	P	Results	Playoffs
2003-04	30	20	8	0	2	227	140	42	2nd EOSHL	Won League
2004-05	32	19	10	-	3	--	--	41	3rd EOSHL	
2005-06	30	15	15	-	0	166	179	30	4th EOSHL	Lost semi-final
2006-07	27	4	22	-	1	131	249	9	4th EOSHL	Lost Sr. AA Final
2007-08	28	1	25	-	2	86	234	4	5th EOSHL	DNQ
