= Allan Cup Hockey =

Senior ice hockey league

- Current season or competition: 2026–27
- Countries: Canada
- Region: Ontario
- Membership: Ontario Hockey Association
- Founded: 1990
- Championship: J. Ross Robertson Cup
- Associated title: Allan Cup
- Recent champions: Wentworth Gryphins (2026)
- Website: allancuphockey.ca

Allan Cup Hockey (ACH), also known as the OHA Senior “AAA” Hockey League, is a senior ice hockey league with five teams in Southern Ontario. The league was founded in 1990 as the Southwestern Senior "A" Hockey League. It is governed by the Ontario Hockey Association and Hockey Canada. The league champions go on to play for the Allan Cup each year. The league came to its latest incarnation when it lost several teams leaving it with two and as a result it merged with the Eastern Ontario Senior Hockey League in 2008.

== Teams ==
The league had five teams at the start of the 2026–27 ACHL season:

Team	Centre	Founded
Cambridge Hornets	Cambridge, Ontario	2025
Dundas Real McCoys	Dundas, Ontario	2000
St. Catharines Saints	St. Catharines	2025
Stoney Creek Tigers	Stoney Creek, Ontario	2023
Wentworth Gryphins	Flamborough, Ontario	2022

In April 2024, the league announced that an expansion team based in Richmond Hill, Ontario would debut in the 2024–25 season, however, this did not materialize. The league then announced that it planned to expand to 8 – 10 teams, and that it had retained a sports marketing firm to identify prospective owners. The search was reportedly focused on markets of 10,000 inhabitants or more, with an arena with capacity for 500 – 1,500 spectators, and the ability to pay the CA$100,000 expansion fee. Markets identified as potential candidates for expansion included Brantford, King City, Orangeville, Guelph, Cambridge, Caledon, and Stratford.

== History ==
Petrolia Squires attack Windsor St. Clair Saints net in 2007-08 Season

The league traces its history back to 1890. The first season of Ontario Hockey Association senior hockey was the 1890-91 season, for the Cosby Cup. Ottawa Hockey Club won the first ever Senior title defeating Toronto St. Georges 5–0. The first "Major" league came in 1929, known as the OHA Senior A Hockey League. The league lasted for fifty seasons, its teams winning 16 Allan Cups. The league was replaced by the Continental Senior A Hockey League in 1979. The Continental league was renamed the OHA Senior A Hockey League in 1980 and lasted until 1987. Teams of the Continental league won 4 Allan Cups.

In 1990, the Southwestern Senior "A" Hockey League was incorporated through the merger between the Central Senior "B" Hockey League, the Seaway-Cyclone Senior "B" Hockey League, and the Southern Ontario Senior "A" Hockey League.

It became Major League Hockey in 2003. The formation of the Major League Hockey marked the first time since 1987 and the folding of the OHA Senior A Hockey League that the Ontario Hockey Association (OHA) has crowned a top level senior league. In 2005, the OHA also granted the Eastern Ontario Senior Hockey League the same status.

In 2008, the Brantford Blast became the first OHA team since the Brantford Motts Clamatos in 1987 to win the Allan Cup. As hosts of the 2008 Allan Cup, the Blast failed to win their league and were allowed to bypass the OHA Final against the Whitby Dunlops and the Renwick Cup against the Thunder Bay Hawks. After almost a months rest, the Blast competed at home for the Allan Cup and won the entire thing. After suffering their only loss of the tournament to the Shawinigan Xtreme in the first game, the Blast defeated the Bentley Generals to clinch second in their division. They defeated the Robertson Cup and EOSHL champion Whitby Dunlops in the quarter-final. They then knocked off the Major League Hockey and Renwick Cup champion Dundas Real McCoys in the semi-final. They met Bentley again in the final, and defeated them 3-1 to win the Canadian National Senior "AAA" crown.

In the 2008 off-season, Major League Hockey ran into some issues. The Windsor St. Clair Saints, the league's only college team, walked away from the league. The Tillsonburg Vipers have officially left the league, as they have applied for expansion into the independent Western Ontario Athletic Association Senior Hockey League. The Petrolia Squires are stranded far away from Brantford and Dundas and have also been accepted into the Western Ontario Athletic Association Senior Hockey League. In the EOSHL, the Frankford Huskies and Marmora Lakers have walked away as well.

Major League Hockey merged with the Eastern Ontario Senior Hockey League in 2008, when AAA-level senior hockey in the OHA shrunk to only five teams.

In 2011, the league changed its name to Allan Cup Hockey. In 2015, two new teams were added: the Hamilton Steelhawks and the Thorold Athletics.

Former OHA president Brent Ladds served as the commissioner of Allan Cup Hockey from 2013 to 2016.

In 2017, the league announced that the Thorold Athletics were taking leave for the 2018-19 season. For the 2019-20 season, the Stoney Creek Generals franchise relocated and merged with the Brantford Blast. The Blast was sold to the owners of the Generals in 2018 and was on leave for the 2018-19 season. For the 2020-21 ACH season, the Whitby Dunlops announced a leave of absence, and the Caledon Crusaders were added as an expansion team. It was then announced that the season would be cancelled entirely. The league returned to action in 2022 with an 8-game schedule. In 2022, the Brantford Blast announced that it would not take part in the 2022–23 season. In 2023, the team announced that it did not plan to return to the league citing a lack of competition. The Brampton Buccaneers ceased operations during the 2023–24 season. In 2023, the Hamilton Steelers folded and the Stoney Creek Tigers joined as an expansion team.

In 2025, the league expanded to five clubs with the formation of the Cambridge Hornets and the St. Catharines Saints.

== League champions ==
The teams of the ACH league play for the league championship J. Ross Robertson Cup. In 2024, the Stoney Creek Tigers won the league championship and the Dundas Real McCoys took the Allan Cup. In 2025, the ACH champions will play off against the champions of the “AA” Ontario Elite Hockey League (OEHL) in a best-of-three series, with the winner going on to represent Ontario at the 2025 Allan Cup Challenge tournament in Innisfail, Alberta.

J. Ross Robertson Cup, OHA Senior AAA Championship trophy

=== Southwestern Senior "A" ===
1991 Exeter Mohawks
1992 Exeter Mohawks
1993 Dunnville Mudcats
1994 Dorchester Dolphins
1995 Ohsweken Riverhawks
1996 Bothwell Bullets
1997 Bothwell Bullets
1998 Aylmer Blues
1999 London MacMaster Chevys
2000 Cambridge Hornets
2001 Simcoe Gunners
2002 Dundas Real McCoys
2003 Dundas Real McCoys

=== Major League Hockey ===
2004 **Aylmer Blues**
2005 **Aylmer Blues**
2006 Dundas Real McCoys
2007 Brantford Blast
2008 Dundas Real McCoys
2009 **Dundas Real McCoys**
2010 **Dundas Real McCoys**
2011 **Dundas Real McCoys**

=== Allan Cup Hockey ===
2012 Dundas Real McCoys
2013 Brantford Blast
2014 Brantford Blast
2015 Dundas Real McCoys
2016 Stoney Creek Generals
2017 Stoney Creek Generals
2018 Stoney Creek Generals
2019 Stoney Creek Generals
2020 playoffs cancelled
2021 season cancelled
2022 Dundas Real McCoys
2023 Hamilton Steelers
2024 Stoney Creek Tigers
2025 Wentworth Gryphins
2026 Wentworth Gryphins

Bolded teams won the Robertson Cup as Ontario Hockey Association champions.

== Allan Cup winners ==
- 2008 Brantford Blast
- 2014 Dundas Real McCoys
- 2018 Stoney Creek Generals
- 2023 Dundas Real McCoys
- 2024 Dundas Real McCoys
- 2025 Wentworth Gryphins

== Former member teams ==
=== ACH/MLH/Southwestern Sr. A ===
- Aylmer Blues
- Baltimore Clippers
- Bothwell Bullets
- Brampton Buccaneers
- Brantford Blast
- Cambridge Hornets
- Creemore Valley Hawks
- Dorchester Dolphins
- Dunnville Mudcats
- Exeter Mohawks
- Hamilton Steelers
- Ingersol B's
- London Admirals
- Norwood Vipers
- Ohsweken Riverhawks
- Orillia Tundras
- Oxford Blues
- Petrolia Squires
- Point Edward Comets
- Simcoe Gunners
- Stoney Creek Generals (franchise relocated, merged with Brantford Blast)
- Strathroy Jets
- Tillsonburg Vipers
- Welland Whalers
- Windsor St. Clair Saints

=== Eastern Sr. A ===
- Cobourg Lynx
- Deseronto Bulldogs
- Kingston Aces
- Marmora Lakers
- St. Lawrence Falcons
- Tamworth Braves

=== Southern Ontario Sr. A ===
- Smithville Real McCoys
- Tillsonburg Maroons
- Woodstock Gems

=== Southern Int. B ===
- Ayr Rockets
- Milton Aeros
- Norwich Imperials
- Paris 29ers
- Plattsville Combines
- Port Dover Lakers
- Rockton Real McCoys
- Six Nations Redmen
- St. Marys Stone Town Flyers

=== Southern Counties Int. B ===
- Caledonia Seniors
- Cheltenham Harvesters
- Delhi Leafs
- Elmira Polar Kings
- Fergus Flyers
- Lucan-Ilderton Jets
- New Hamburg Screaming Eagles
- Preston Jesters
- Simcoe County Kings

=== Central Int. C ===
- Arthur Tigers
- Goderich Sailors
- New Hamburg Panthers
- Port Elgin Sunocos

=== Central Sr. A ===
- Durham Huskies
- Elora Rocks
- Harriston Blues
- Hillsburgh Seniors
- Palmerston 81's
- Tavistock Royals

=== Northern Sr. A ===
- Creemore Chiefs
- Grand Valley Harvesters
- Honeywood Cougars
- Owen Sound Canadians
- Shelburne Muskies

=== OHA Int. C ===
- Clinton Colts
- Kincardine Texacos
- Lucknow Lancers
- Milverton Four Wheel Drives
- Mitchell Red Devils
- Seaforth Seniors
- Southampton Seniors
- Wiarton Redmen

=== Seaway-Cyclone Sr. B ===
- Alvinston 77's
- Dresden Lumber Kings
- Lambeth Seniors
- Wallaceburg Whalers
- Walpole Island Hawks
- Watford Generals

=== Seaway-Cyclone Int. B ===
- Glencoe Centennials

=== Seaway Int. C ===
- Blenheim Seniors
- Leamington Lakers
- Tilbury Selects
- Wheatley Omsteads

=== Seaway-Western Int. C ===
- Chatham Royals
- Forest Boyds
- Sandwich West Seniors

=== Western/Tri-County Int. C ===
- Belmont Blazers
- Point Edward Easy Movers

=== Cyclone Int. D ===
- West Lorne Blues
