= Thorold Athletics =

The Thorold Athletics were a senior-level ice hockey team based in Thorold, Ontario, Canada. The team was a member of the Allan Cup Hockey league of the Ontario Hockey Association.

The team began play in the 2015–16 season as an expansion team and plays at the Thorold Community Arenas. After announcing a leave of absence in 2017, they have yet to return (as of the 2020-21 season.)

| Season | GP | W | L | OTL | SOL | Pts | GF | GA | PIM |
| 2015–16 | 24 | 11 | 11 | 2 | - | 32 | 110 | 115 | 406 |
| Playoffs 2016 | 2 | - | 2 | - | - | - | 5 | 12 | 32 |

Source: pointstreak.com
