= Stoney Creek Tigers =

Senior ice hockey team

- City: Stoney Creek, Ontario
- League: Allan Cup Hockey
- Founded: 2023
- Home arena: Stoney Creek Arena
- Colours: Black; Tangerine yellow
- General manager: Anthony Gravelle
- Head coach: Paul Moriarty
- Website: stoneycreektigers.ca

Championships
- League: 2024

The Stoney Creek Tigers is a senior ice hockey team in Allan Cup Hockey (ACH), that plays its home games at the Stoney Creek Arena in Stoney Creek, Ontario.

== History ==
The Stoney Creek Tigers were establshed for the 2023–24 season, by Daniel Svedin and Chris Knighton who formerly played on the Hamilton Steelers. The Tigers wore he same colours and similar logo as did Hamilton, and played home games at the Gateway Arena Stoney Creek, Ontario.

The Tigers won the league championship J. Ross Robertson Cup in their inaugural 2023–24 season after defeating the Wentworth Gryphins in the final. In the 2024–25 season, the Tigers lost in the semi final against the Dundas Real McCoys. Tigers goaltender, Daniel Svedin, was named the league's top goaltender of 2024–25 with a .919% save percentage across 6 games. Tigers forward, Cordell James, was the league's leading scorer of 2024–25, with 10 goals and 14 assists in 12 games.

The Tigers relocated home games to Stoney Creek Arena as of the 2025–26 season.

== Season-by-season results ==
Statistics
| Season | GP | W | L | OTW | OTL | Pts | GF | GA | Regular season | Postseason |
|---|---|---|---|---|---|---|---|---|---|---|
| 2023–24 | 16 | 10 | 5 | 0 | 1 | 29 | 124 | 84 | 2nd place | Won final against Wentworth (2:1) |
| 2024–25 | 13 | 7 | 6 | 1 | 0 | 20 | 66 | 65 | 2nd place | Lost semifinal against Dundas (2:0) |
| 2025–26 | 24 | 19 | 3 | 0 | 2 | 59 | 143 | 86 | 1st place | Won semifinal against Dundas (3:0); Lost final against Wentworth (3:2) |
