= Shawn Antoski =

Canadian ice hockey player (born 1970)

- Born: March 25, 1970 (age 56) Brantford, Ontario, Canada
- Height: 6 ft 4 in (193 cm)
- Weight: 235 lb (107 kg; 16 st 11 lb)
- Position: Left wing
- Shot: Left
- Played for: Vancouver Canucks; Philadelphia Flyers; Pittsburgh Penguins; Mighty Ducks of Anaheim
- NHL draft: 18th overall, 1990; Vancouver Canucks
- Playing career: 1990–1998

Shawn Antoski (born March 25, 1970) is a Canadian former professional ice hockey left winger who played eight seasons in the National Hockey League in the 1990s.

Shawn Antoski has two sons.

== Playing career ==
Antoski played minor hockey for the Don Mills Flyers Midgets of the MTHL in 1986-87 and was drafted in the fourth round (59th overall) of the 1987 OHL priority selection.

Antoski played his junior hockey in the Ontario Hockey League with the North Bay Centennials, and was selected by the Vancouver Canucks in the first round (18th overall) of the 1990 NHL entry draft, just ahead of future superstars Keith Tkachuk and Martin Brodeur.

Although his role was primarily that of an enforcer, Antoski was noted for his skating ability, which was exceptional for a player of his size. While his offensive ability was very limited, his speed and size made him a fearsome forechecker and a heavy bodychecker. He was also an able fighter.

Antoski turned professional in 1990 and was assigned to the Milwaukee Admirals, Vancouver's IHL farm team. He spent most of the next three season toiling in minor pro, although he received a brief callup each year, playing in a total of eight NHL games. He finally established himself as an NHL regular in the 1993–94, appearing in 55 games for the Canucks and recording three points and 190 penalty minutes. The highlight of his career came in that year's playoffs, as Vancouver reached the Stanley Cup Final. Playing on a gritty fourth line with Tim Hunter and John McIntyre, Antoski was a physical catalyst for the team and played probably the best hockey of his career.

Early in the 1994–95 season, Antoski was dealt to the Philadelphia Flyers for Josef Beranek, and again participated in a lengthy playoff run as Philadelphia reached the conference finals. In 1995–96, he set career highs by appearing in 64 games and recording 204 PIM, and scored his first career playoff goal.

Antoski signed as a free agent with the Pittsburgh Penguins for the 1996–97 season, but only appeared in 13 games for the Penguins before being dealt to the Mighty Ducks of Anaheim, and only appeared in two games for the Mighty Ducks before his season was ended due to injury. He returned to the Ducks the following season, but on November 24, 1997, he was involved in a serious car accident which left him with a compressed skull fracture. While he recovered fully, it marked the end of his hockey career.

Antoski appeared in 183 NHL games, recording three goals and eight points, along with 599 PIM. He also suited up for 36 playoff games, recording four points and 74 PIM.

His younger brother Shayne, at 6' 4 200 lbs, was a teammate in North Bay, and also went on to a brief pro career, playing two seasons in the ECHL.

Shawn resides in the rural community of Madoc, Ontario, and is the president of the Belleville Minor Hockey Association.

== Career statistics ==
			Regular season					Playoffs
Season	Team	League	GP	G	A	Pts	PIM	GP	G	A	Pts	PIM
1985–86	Don Mills Flyers AAA	Midget	27	10	15	25	50	—	—	—	—	—
1986–87	Don Mills Flyers AAA	Midget	33	12	13	25	75	—	—	—	—	—
1987–88	North Bay Centennials	OHL	52	3	4	7	163	—	—	—	—	—
1988–89	North Bay Centennials	OHL	57	6	21	27	201	9	5	3	8	24
1989–90	North Bay Centennials	OHL	59	25	31	56	201	5	1	2	3	17
1990–91	Vancouver Canucks	NHL	2	0	0	0	0	—	—	—	—	—
1990–91	Milwaukee Admirals	IHL	62	17	7	24	330	5	1	2	3	10
1991–92	Vancouver Canucks	NHL	4	0	0	0	29	—	—	—	—	—
1991–92	Milwaukee Admirals	IHL	52	17	16	33	346	5	2	0	2	20
1992–93	Vancouver Canucks	NHL	2	0	0	0	0	—	—	—	—	—
1992–93	Hamilton Canucks	AHL	41	3	4	7	172	—	—	—	—	—
1993–94	Vancouver Canucks	NHL	55	1	2	3	190	16	0	1	1	36
1994–95	Vancouver Canucks	NHL	7	0	0	0	46	—	—	—	—	—
1994–95	Philadelphia Flyers	NHL	25	0	0	0	61	13	0	1	1	10
1995–96	Philadelphia Flyers	NHL	64	1	3	4	204	7	1	1	2	28
1996–97	Pittsburgh Penguins	NHL	13	0	0	0	49	—	—	—	—	—
1996–97	Mighty Ducks of Anaheim	NHL	2	0	0	0	2	—	—	—	—	—
1997–98	Mighty Ducks of Anaheim	NHL	9	1	0	1	18	—	—	—	—	—
2005–06	Belleville McFarlands	EOSHL	28	30	18	48	14	5	2	3	5	2
2006–07	Marmora Lakers	EOSHL	16	8	6	14	11	4	1	6	7	2
NHL totals			183	3	5	8	599	36	1	3	4	74
IHL totals			114	34	23	57	676	10	3	2	5	30

== Fights ==
- One of Antoski's most famous fights was on January 5, 1992, when he took on Steve Martinson during a Milwaukee Admirals-San Diego Gulls game. Martinson and Antoski went to the penalty box, then started yelling at each other until Martinson launched his water bottle at Antoski. Antoski climbed over the glass into Martinson's penalty box and proceeded to pummel him until referees could break up the fight.

== Transactions ==
- On June 16, 1990, the Vancouver Canucks selected Shawn Antoski in the first round (No. 18 overall) of the 1990 NHL draft.
- On February 15, 1995, the Vancouver Canucks traded Shawn Antoski to the Philadelphia Flyers in exchange for Josef Beranek.
- On July 31, 1996, the Pittsburgh Penguins signed free agent Shawn Antoski.
- On November 19, 1996, the Pittsburgh Penguins traded Shawn Antoski and Dmitri Mironov to the Mighty Ducks of Anaheim in exchange for Alex Hicks and Fredrik Olausson.

Preceded by Petr Nedvěd	Vancouver Canucks first-round draft pick 1990	Succeeded by Alek Stojanov
