= J. Ross Robertson Cup =

Canadian ice hockey trophy

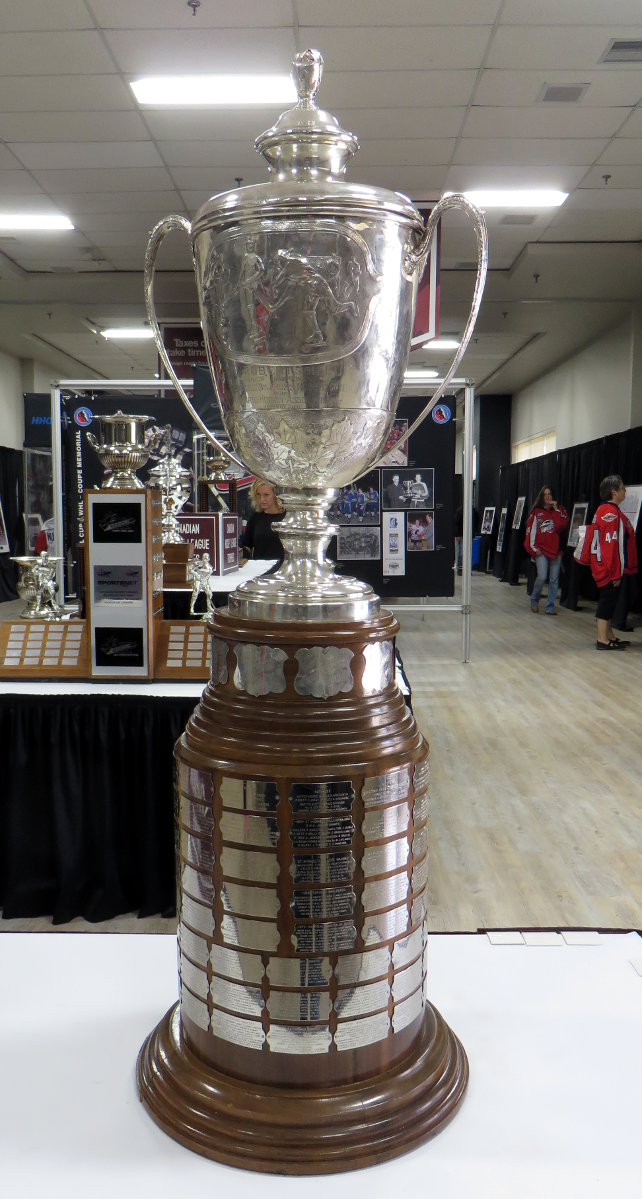
- Sport: Ice hockey
- League: Ontario Hockey League
- Awarded for: Playoffs champion
- Country: Canada

History
- First award: 1910–11
- First winner: Kingston Frontenacs
- Most wins: Oshawa Generals (13)
- Most recent: Kitchener Rangers (5)

The J. Ross Robertson Cup is a Canadian ice hockey trophy. It is awarded annually in junior ice hockey to the champion of the Ontario Hockey League playoffs. It was donated by John Ross Robertson to the Ontario Hockey Association in 1910, and is the third of three similarly named trophies he established. His other eponymous trophies for the OHA include, the J. Ross Robertson Cup awarded to the annual champions of Allan Cup Hockey, and the J. Ross Robertson Cup which was awarded to the annual champions of the discontinued intermediate division.

The J. Ross Robertson Cup has continuously been awarded as the playoffs championship trophy for the top tier of junior hockey in Ontario. The cup transitioned from the Ontario Hockey Association to the Ontario Major Junior Hockey League in 1974, and has been the championship trophy of the Ontario Hockey League since 1980. The winner of the J. Ross Robertson Cup has been eligible to compete for the Memorial Cup as the junior hockey champion of Canada since 1919.

== History ==
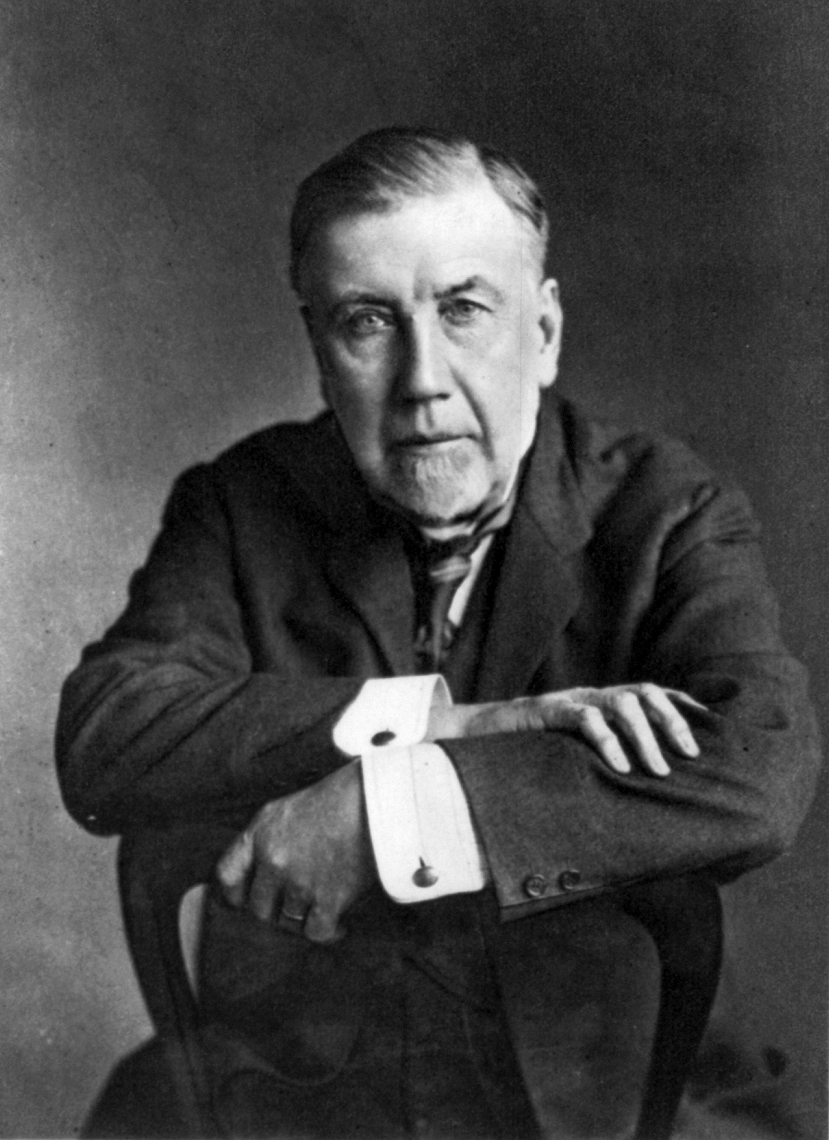
John Ross Robertson

The J. Ross Robertson Cup was donated by John Ross Robertson on November 19, 1910, to be awarded annually to the champion of the junior ice hockey division in the Ontario Hockey Association (OHA). Robertson served as president of the OHA from 1899 to 1905, had founded the Toronto Evening Telegram in 1876, helped establish The Hospital for Sick Children, and was a member of the House of Commons of Canada for Toronto East. He was against professionalism in sports, and felt that "sport should be pursued for its own sake, for when professionalism begins, true sport ends".

The OHA first established a junior hockey division for the 1892–93 season, and the J. Ross Robertson Cup was first awarded during the 1910–11 season. The cup is a sterling silver bowl 18.5 inches (47 cm) tall, engraved with a hockey-playing scene and interlaced maple leaves in bas-relief. The cup is the third of three similarly named trophies Robertson donated to the OHA, which included the J. Ross Robertson Cup for the annual champions of the senior division, and the J. Ross Robertson Cup for the annual champions of intermediate division.

The Memorial Cup was founded in 1919, which gave the opportunity for each season's J. Ross Robertson Cup winner to partake in national playoffs arranged by the Canadian Amateur Hockey Association for the junior hockey championship of Canada. The national playoffs culminated in an east-versus-west final, and the Eastern Canada junior champion was also awarded the George Richardson Memorial Trophy from 1932 to 1971. In 1972, the Memorial Cup format changed to a round-robin tournament and the J. Ross Robertson Cup winner received an automatic berth in the tournament along with the Quebec Major Junior Hockey League and Western Hockey League champions.

The OHA split junior hockey into A and B levels for the 1933–34 season. The junior-A level competed for the J. Ross Robertson Cup, and the junior-B level competed for the newly established Sutherland Cup. The J. Ross Robertson Cup remained the playoffs championship trophy for the top tier of junior hockey in the OHA. The cup was awarded to the OHA Major Junior A Series champion from 1972 to 1974, the Ontario Major Junior Hockey League champion from 1974 to 1980, and has been the championship trophy of the Ontario Hockey League since 1980.

The Ontario Hockey League established the Bobby Orr Trophy and the Wayne Gretzky Trophy in 1999, for the respective Eastern Conference and Western Conference champions which compete for the J. Ross Robertson Cup. The Wayne Gretzky 99 Award was established in 1999, and is given to the most valuable player of the Ontario Hockey League playoffs at the conclusion of the J. Ross Robertson Cup finals.

== Winners and finalists ==
=== 1911 to 1932 ===
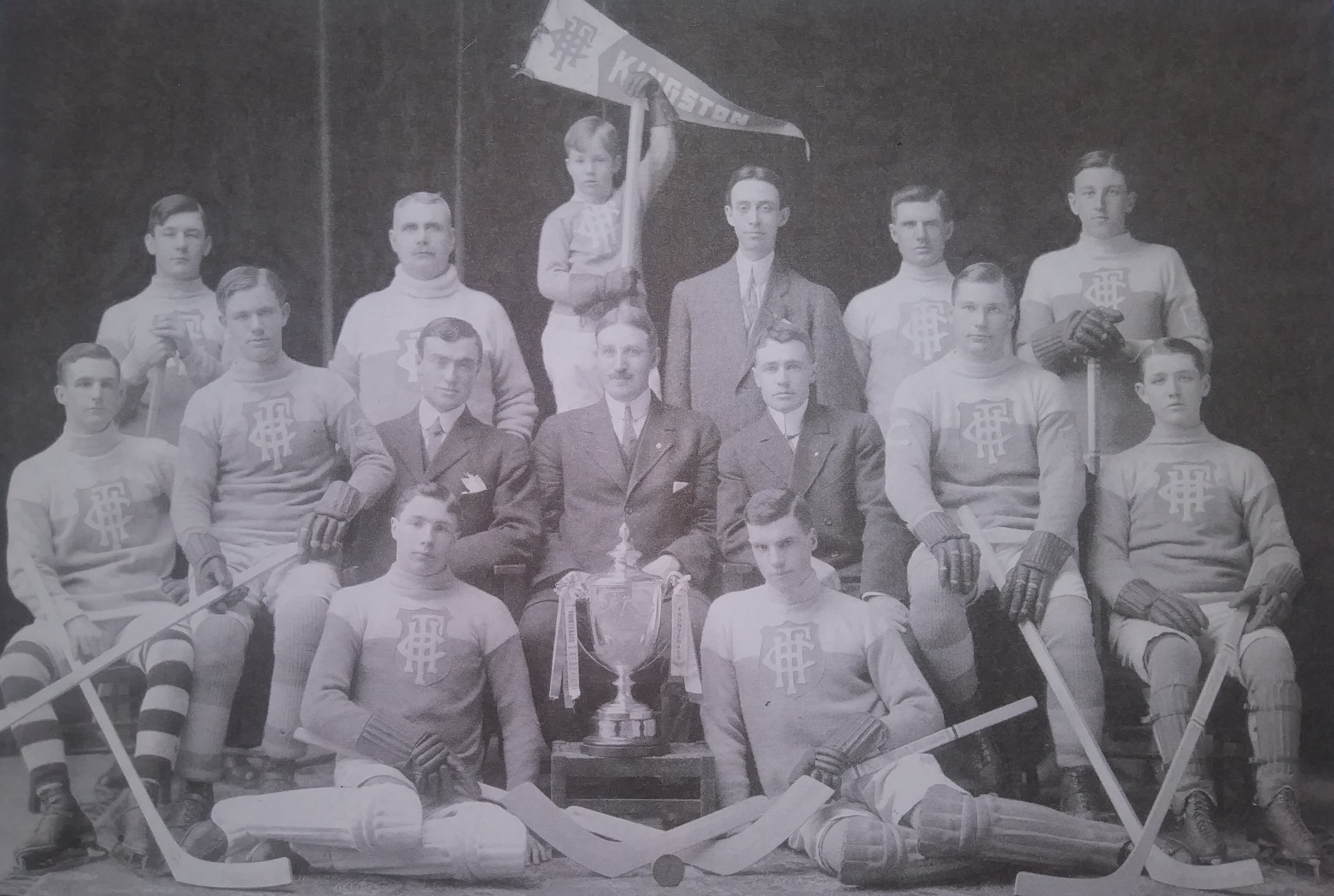
The 1910–11 Kingston Frontenacs won the J. Ross Robertson Cup and were billed by the OHA as the "junior champions of Canada".

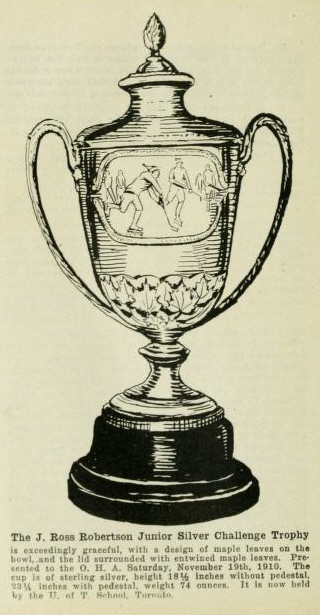
J. Ross Robertson Cup c. 1915

The OHA's J. Ross Robertson Cup champion was determined by a total-goals series from 1911 to 1932. The number of games played varied by season from one to three games.

List of winning teams and finalists from 1911 to 1932. (Note: Champions, total goals and finalists as per the Ontario Hockey Association.)

denotes team later won that season's national Memorial Cup championship

Season	Champion	Total goals	Finalist	OHA Champion's subsequent Memorial Cup result (Note: Subsequent results as per Lapp & Macaulay.)
1910–11	Kingston Frontenacs	21–11	Orillia Hockey Club	not applicable (Note: Inter-provincial and national playoffs for junior ice hockey under the jurisdiction of the Canadian Amateur Hockey Association began with the establishment of the Memorial Cup in 1919.)
1911–12	Toronto Canoe Club Paddlers	16–7	Orillia Hockey Club	not applicable
1912–13	Orillia Hockey Club	14–8	Woodstock Juniors	not applicable
1913–14	Orillia Hockey Club	13–7	University of Toronto Schools	not applicable
1914–15	University of Toronto Schools	16–11	Berlin Union Jacks	not applicable
1915–16	Toronto Aura Lee	6–4	Berlin Union Jacks	not applicable
1916–17	Toronto Aura Lee	18–5	Kitchener Union Jacks	not applicable
1917–18	Toronto De La Salle College	10–8	Barrie Canoe Club	not applicable
1918–19	University of Toronto Schools	8–7	Woodstock Juniors	1919 Memorial Cup champion
1919–20	Toronto Canoe Club Paddlers	15–8	Stratford Midgets	1920 Memorial Cup champion
1920–21	Stratford Midgets	7–3	Queen's University	1921 Memorial Cup finalist
1921–22	Toronto Aura Lee	6–4	Toronto St. Mary's	Eastern Canada finalist
1922–23	Kitchener Colts	7–4	University of Toronto Schools	1923 Memorial Cup finalist
1923–24	Owen Sound Greys	12–7	Kitchener Colts	1924 Memorial Cup champion
1924–25	Toronto Aura Lee	14–11	Owen Sound Greys	1925 Memorial Cup finalist
1925–26	Queen's University	7–4	Owen Sound Greys	1926 Memorial Cup finalist
1926–27	Owen Sound Greys	7–3	Newmarket Redmen	1927 Memorial Cup champion
1927–28	Toronto Marlboros	4–3	Newmarket Redmen	Eastern Canada finalist
1928–29	Toronto Marlboros	4–3	Kitchener Greenshirts	1929 Memorial Cup champion
1929–30	West Toronto Nationals	11–9	Niagara Falls Cataracts	1930 Memorial Cup finalist
1930–31	Niagara Falls Cataracts	12–7	West Toronto Nationals	Eastern Canada finalist
1931–32	Toronto Marlboros	4–1	Newmarket Redmen	Eastern Canada quarterfinalist

=== 1933 to present ===
Since 1933, the J. Ross Robertson Cup champion has been determined by either the most wins in total-games series, or the most points earned in a series.

List of OHA (to 1979) / OHL (since 1980) winning teams and runner-up finalists since 1933. (Note: Champions, total games and finalists from 1933 to 1971 as per the Ontario Hockey Association. Champions, total games and finalists since 1972 as per Hockey Database.)

denotes team later won that season's national Memorial Cup championship

Season	Champion	Series (W–L–T)	Finalist	Subsequent results (Note: Subsequent results from 1933 to 1971 as per Lapp & Macaulay. Subsequent results since 1972 as per the Memorial Cup archives maintained by the Canadian Hockey League.) (Note: Starting in 1983, the Memorial Cup expanded to a four team tournament, with host team of the tournament receiving an automatic entry. In years when the OHL Memorial Cup host makes it to the J. Ross Robertson Cup finals, then both OHL Robertson Cup finalists entered the Memorial Cup tournament. (see 1987 Memorial Cup for the sole exception to this))
1932–33	Newmarket Redmen	2–1–1	Stratford Midgets	1933 Memorial Cup champion
1933–34	Toronto St. Michael's Majors	2–0	Stratford Midgets	1934 Memorial Cup champion
1934–35	Kitchener Greenshirts	Default (Note: Though the Oshawa Majors defeated the Kitchener Greenshirts on the ice at the 1935 J. Ross Robertson Cup final, Kitchener filed a protest, believing Oshawa had used an ineligible player. After a lengthy review, the Ontario Hockey Association (OHA) retroactively declared the series defaulted by Oshawa and awarded the trophy to the Kitchener Greenshirts. While the OHA was reviewing the protest, Oshawa participated in the Eastern Canada playoffs to determine the Eastern representative for the 1935 Memorial Cup national championship. As such, the true 1935 Robertson Cup champion did not participate in the Memorial Cup effort.)	Oshawa Majors	did not participate
1935–36	West Toronto Nationals	2–0	Kitchener Greenshirts	1936 Memorial Cup champion
1936–37	Toronto St. Michael's Majors	3–2	Stratford Midgets	Eastern Canada quarterfinalist
1937–38	Oshawa Generals	3–0	Guelph Indians	1938 Memorial Cup finalist
1938–39	Oshawa Generals	3–0	Toronto Native Sons	1939 Memorial Cup champion
1939–40	Oshawa Generals	3–2	Toronto Marlboros	1940 Memorial Cup champion
1940–41	Oshawa Generals	4–3	Toronto Marlboros	Eastern Canada finalist
1941–42	Oshawa Generals	3–2	Guelph Biltmores	1942 Memorial Cup finalist
1942–43	Oshawa Generals	4–1	Brantford Lions	1943 Memorial Cup finalist
1943–44	Oshawa Generals	4–1	Toronto St. Michael's Majors	1944 Memorial Cup champion
1944–45	Toronto St. Michael's Majors	4–0	Galt Red Wings	1945 Memorial Cup champion
1945–46	Toronto St. Michael's Majors	4–2	Oshawa Generals	1946 Memorial Cup finalist
1946–47	Toronto St. Michael's Majors	4–0	Galt Red Wings	1947 Memorial Cup champion
1947–48	Barrie Flyers	4–2	Windsor Spitfires	1948 Memorial Cup finalist
1948–49	Barrie Flyers	4–0	Toronto Marlboros	Eastern Canada finalist
1949–50	Guelph Biltmores	4–2	Windsor Spitfires	Eastern Canada finalist
1950–51	Barrie Flyers	4–2	Toronto Marlboros	1951 Memorial Cup champion
1951–52	Guelph Biltmores	4–1	St. Catharines Teepees	1952 Memorial Cup champion
1952–53	Barrie Flyers	5–3	Toronto St. Michael's Majors	1953 Memorial Cup champion
1953–54	St. Catharines Teepees	4–3	Toronto Marlboros	1954 Memorial Cup champion
1954–55	Toronto Marlboros	4–2	St. Catharines Teepees	1955 Memorial Cup champion
1955–56	Toronto Marlboros	4–1	Barrie Flyers	1956 Memorial Cup champion
1956–57	Guelph Biltmores	4–2	St. Catharines Teepees	Eastern Canada finalist
1957–58	Toronto Marlboros	4–0–1	Hamilton Tiger Cubs	Eastern Canada finalist
1958–59	Peterborough TPT Petes	3–2–3	Toronto St. Michael's Majors	1959 Memorial Cup finalist
1959–60	St. Catharines Teepees	3–1–2	Toronto St. Michael's Majors	1960 Memorial Cup champion
1960–61	Toronto St. Michael's Majors	4–2–1	Guelph Royals	1961 Memorial Cup champion
1961–62	Hamilton Red Wings	4–1	Toronto St. Michael's Majors	1962 Memorial Cup champion
1962–63	Niagara Falls Flyers	4–2	Toronto Neil McNeil Maroons	1963 Memorial Cup finalist
1963–64	Toronto Marlboros	4–0–1	Montreal Junior Canadiens	1964 Memorial Cup champion
1964–65	Niagara Falls Flyers	4–1	Toronto Marlboros	1965 Memorial Cup champion
1965–66	Oshawa Generals	4–1	Kitchener Rangers	1966 Memorial Cup finalist
1966–67	Toronto Marlboros	4–0	Hamilton Red Wings	1967 Memorial Cup champion
1967–68	Niagara Falls Flyers	4–3–1	Kitchener Rangers	1968 Memorial Cup champion
1968–69	Montreal Junior Canadiens	4–0–1	St. Catharines Black Hawks	1969 Memorial Cup champion
1969–70	Montreal Junior Canadiens	4–3	Toronto Marlboros	1970 Memorial Cup champion
1970–71	St. Catharines Black Hawks	4–0	Toronto Marlboros	Eastern Canada finalist
1971–72	Peterborough Petes	3–0–2	Ottawa 67's	1972 Memorial Cup finalist
1972–73	Toronto Marlboros	3–2–2	Peterborough Petes	1973 Memorial Cup champion
1973–74	St. Catharines Black Hawks	4–0–1	Peterborough Petes	3rd place at 1974 Memorial Cup
1974–75	Toronto Marlboros	4–3	Hamilton Fincups	1975 Memorial Cup champion
1975–76	Hamilton Fincups	4–2	Sudbury Wolves	1976 Memorial Cup champion
1976–77	Ottawa 67's	4–2	London Knights	1977 Memorial Cup finalist
1977–78	Peterborough Petes	4–3	Hamilton Fincups	1978 Memorial Cup finalist
1978–79	Peterborough Petes	4–3	Niagara Falls Flyers	1979 Memorial Cup champion
1979–80	Peterborough Petes	4–0	Windsor Spitfires	1980 Memorial Cup finalist
1980–81	Kitchener Rangers	3–0–3	Sault Ste. Marie Greyhounds	1981 Memorial Cup finalist
1981–82	Kitchener Rangers	4–0–1	Ottawa 67's	1982 Memorial Cup champion
1982–83	Oshawa Generals	4–0	Sault Ste. Marie Greyhounds	1983 Memorial Cup finalist
1983–84	Ottawa 67's	3–1–2	Kitchener Rangers	1984 Memorial Cup champion
1983–84	Ottawa 67's	3–1–2	Kitchener Rangers	Kitchener, 1984 Memorial Cup finalist
1984–85	Sault Ste. Marie Greyhounds	4–2–1	Peterborough Petes	3rd place at 1985 Memorial Cup
1985–86	Guelph Platers	3–2–2	Belleville Bulls	1986 Memorial Cup champion
1986–87	Oshawa Generals	4–3	North Bay Centennials	1987 Memorial Cup finalist
1987–88	Windsor Compuware Spitfires	4–0	Peterborough Petes	1988 Memorial Cup finalist
1988–89	Peterborough Petes	4–2	Niagara Falls Thunder	3rd place at 1989 Memorial Cup
1989–90	Oshawa Generals	4–3	Kitchener Rangers	1990 Memorial Cup champion
1989–90	Oshawa Generals	4–3	Kitchener Rangers	Kitchener 1990 Memorial Cup finalist
1990–91	Sault Ste. Marie Greyhounds	4–2	Oshawa Generals	4th place at 1991 Memorial Cup
1991–92	Sault Ste. Marie Greyhounds	4–3	North Bay Centennials	1992 Memorial Cup finalist
1992–93	Peterborough Petes	4–1	Sault Ste. Marie Greyhounds	Peterborough, 1993 Memorial Cup finalist
1992–93	Peterborough Petes	4–1	Sault Ste. Marie Greyhounds	Sault Ste. Marie, 1993 Memorial Cup champion
1993–94	North Bay Centennials	4–3	Detroit Junior Red Wings	4th place at 1994 Memorial Cup
1994–95	Detroit Junior Red Wings	4–2	Guelph Storm	1995 Memorial Cup finalist
1995–96	Peterborough Petes	4–3	Guelph Storm	Peterborough, 1996 Memorial Cup finalist
1995–96	Peterborough Petes	4–3	Guelph Storm	Guelph, 4th place at 1996 Memorial Cup
1996–97	Oshawa Generals	4–2	Ottawa 67's	3rd place at 1997 Memorial Cup
1997–98	Guelph Storm	4–1	Ottawa 67's	1998 Memorial Cup finalist
1998–99	Belleville Bulls	4–3	London Knights	3rd place at 1999 Memorial Cup
1999–2000	Barrie Colts	4–3	Plymouth Whalers	2000 Memorial Cup finalist
2000–01	Ottawa 67's	4–2	Plymouth Whalers	4th place at 2001 Memorial Cup
2001–02	Erie Otters	4–1	Barrie Colts	3rd place at 2002 Memorial Cup
2002–03	Kitchener Rangers	4–1	Ottawa 67's	2003 Memorial Cup champion
2003–04	Guelph Storm	4–0	Mississauga IceDogs	4th place at 2004 Memorial Cup
2004–05	London Knights	4–1	Ottawa 67's	London, 2005 Memorial Cup champion
2004–05	London Knights	4–1	Ottawa 67's	Ottawa, 3rd place at 2005 Memorial Cup
2005–06	Peterborough Petes	4–0	London Knights	4th place at 2006 Memorial Cup
2006–07	Plymouth Whalers	4–2	Sudbury Wolves	3rd place at 2007 Memorial Cup
2007–08	Kitchener Rangers	4–3	Belleville Bulls	Kitchener, 2008 Memorial Cup finalist
2007–08	Kitchener Rangers	4–3	Belleville Bulls	Belleville, 3rd place at 2008 Memorial Cup
2008–09	Windsor Spitfires	4–1	Brampton Battalion	2009 Memorial Cup champion
2009–10	Windsor Spitfires	4–0	Barrie Colts	2010 Memorial Cup champion
2010–11	Owen Sound Attack	4–3	Mississauga St. Michael's Majors	Owen Sound, 4th place at 2011 Memorial Cup
2010–11	Owen Sound Attack	4–3	Mississauga St. Michael's Majors	Mississauga, 2011 Memorial Cup finalist
2011–12	London Knights	4–1	Niagara IceDogs	2012 Memorial Cup finalist
2012–13	London Knights	4–3	Barrie Colts	3rd place at 2013 Memorial Cup
2013–14	Guelph Storm	4–1	North Bay Battalion	2014 Memorial Cup finalist
2014–15	Oshawa Generals	4–1	Erie Otters	2015 Memorial Cup champion
2015–16	London Knights	4–0	Niagara IceDogs	2016 Memorial Cup champion
2016–17	Erie Otters	4–1	Mississauga Steelheads	2017 Memorial Cup finalist
2017–18	Hamilton Bulldogs	4–2	Sault Ste. Marie Greyhounds	3rd place at 2018 Memorial Cup
2018–19	Guelph Storm	4–2	Ottawa 67's	3rd place at 2019 Memorial Cup
2019–20	OHL playoffs cancelled due to the COVID-19 pandemic – J. Ross Robertson Cup not awarded			
2020–21	Season cancelled due to the COVID-19 pandemic			
2021–22	Hamilton Bulldogs	4–3	Windsor Spitfires	2022 Memorial Cup finalist
2022–23	Peterborough Petes	4–2	London Knights	3rd place at 2023 Memorial Cup
2023–24	London Knights	4–0	Oshawa Generals	2024 Memorial Cup finalist
2024–25	London Knights	4–1	Oshawa Generals	2025 Memorial Cup champion
2025–26	Kitchener Rangers	4–0	Barrie Colts	2026 Memorial Cup champion

== Sources ==
- Bell, Aaron (2017). 2017–18 OHL Media Information Guide (PDF). Scarborough, Ontario: Ontario Hockey League. Archived from the original (PDF) on February 17, 2019.
- Fitsell, J.W. (Bill) (2012). Captain James T. Sutherland: The Grand Old Man of Hockey & The Battle for the Original Hockey Hall of Fame. Kingston, Ontario: Quarry Heritage Books. ISBN 978-1-55082-374-5.
- Lapp, Richard M.; Macaulay, Alec (1997). The Memorial Cup: Canada's National Junior Hockey Championship. Madeira Park, British Columbia: Harbour Publishing. ISBN 1-55017-170-4.
- Podnieks, Andrew; Hockey Hall of Fame (2005). Silverware. Bolton, Ontario: Fenn Publishing Company. ISBN 1-55168-296-6.
- Annual Report: Constitution, Regulations and Rules of Competition. Cambridge, Ontario: Ontario Hockey Association. 2006.

== See also ==
- Ed Chynoweth Cup - WHL
- President's Cup - QMJHL
- List of Canadian Hockey League awards
