= Kingston Aces =

Canadian senior ice hockey team

The Kingston Aces were a pair of senior ice hockey teams based in Kingston, Ontario, Canada.

The first Kingston Aces were members of the Ontario Hockey Association (OHA). They played in the OHA Senior A League from 1965 to 1973, and played home games at the Kingston Memorial Centre. The Aces won the J. Ross Robertson Cup as league champions during the 1966–67 season.

The second Kingston Aces played in the OHA's Eastern Ontario Senior Hockey League in 2005 and 2006. During this time the league was at Senior AAA level, having just been promoted from Senior A.
