= Norwood Vipers =

- City: Norwood, Ontario
- League: Allan Cup Hockey 2011–14; Major League Hockey 2008–11; Eastern Ontario Senior Hockey League 2004–08
- Founded: 2004; 22 years ago
- Folded: 2014; 12 years ago
- Home arena: Asphodel-Norwood Community Centre
- Colours: Blue and White
- Owner: Bob McCleary
- Head coach: Tom Ruff

The Norwood Vipers were a Senior "AAA" ice hockey team from Norwood, Ontario, Canada. They played in the Ontario Hockey Association's Allan Cup Hockey League.

== History ==
In 2004, the Norwood Vipers joined the Eastern Ontario Senior Hockey League. They won the league championship in their first season after downing the Whitby Dunlops in six-games.

In 2008, the Eastern Ontario Senior Hockey League folded and the Vipers joined Major League Hockey which changed its name to Allan Cup Hockey for the 2011–12 season.

The Vipers sat out the 2012–13 season.

The 2013–14 season started under a new owner, Bob McCleery.

== Season-by-season results ==
Season	GP	W	L	T	OTL	GF	GA	P	Results	Playoffs
2004–05	32	29	2	-	1	--	--	59	1st EOSHL	Won league
2005–06	30	22	6	-	2	213	106	46	2nd EOSHL	Lost final
2006–07	28	14	13	-	1	159	137	29	3rd EOSHL	Lost final
2007–08	28	15	12	-	1	158	146	31	4th EOSHL	Lost semi-final
2008–09	28	15	9	-	4	145	131	34	3rd MLH	Lost semi-final
2009–10	24	10	13	-	1	95	130	21	3rd MLH	Lost SF Round Robin
2010–11	24	10	11	-	3	101	117	23	4th MLH	Lost final
2011–12	28	6	20	-	2	131	195	14	5th ACH	DNQ
2012–13	Did not participate									
2013–14	24	2	21	-	1	98	214	5	6th ACH	DNQ
