= St. Catharines Saints (ACH) =

Senior ice hockey franchise of the Allen Cup Hockey League

- City: St. Catharines
- League: ACH
- Founded: 2025
- Home arena: Merritton Centennial Arena
- Colours: Pine green Navy blue Mustard yellow
- Owner: Pat Smith
- General manager: Pat Smith
- Head coach: Mike Duncan
- Website: saints-hockey.com

The St. Catharines Saints is a senior ice hockey club in the Allan Cup Hockey League (ACH) based in St. Catharines, Ontario. The club plays its home games at the Merritton Centennial Arena in St. Catharines.

== Sources ==
- "2 new teams join Allan Cup Hockey League". CHCH-TV. 20 October 2025.
- "Saints return to AAA hockey: 2025–26 schedule announced". saints.hockeyshift.com (Press release). St. Catherines Saints. 18 July 2025.
