= J. Ross Robertson Cup (intermediate ice hockey) =

Canadian ice hockey trophy

- Sport: Ice hockey
- League: Ontario Hockey Association
- Competition: Intermediate level
- Awarded for: Playoffs champion
- Country: Canada

History
- First award: 1898–99
- Final award: 1933–34
- First winner: Kingston Frontenacs
- Most wins: Collingwood (5)
- Most recent: Oakville

The J. Ross Robertson Cup was a Canadian ice hockey trophy. It was awarded annually to the champion of the intermediate division in the Ontario Hockey Association from the 1898–99 season until the 1933–34 season. It was the second of three similarly named trophies donated by John Ross Robertson, which included the J. Ross Robertson Cup for the annual champions of the junior division, and the J. Ross Robertson Cup for the annual champions of senior division.

== History ==
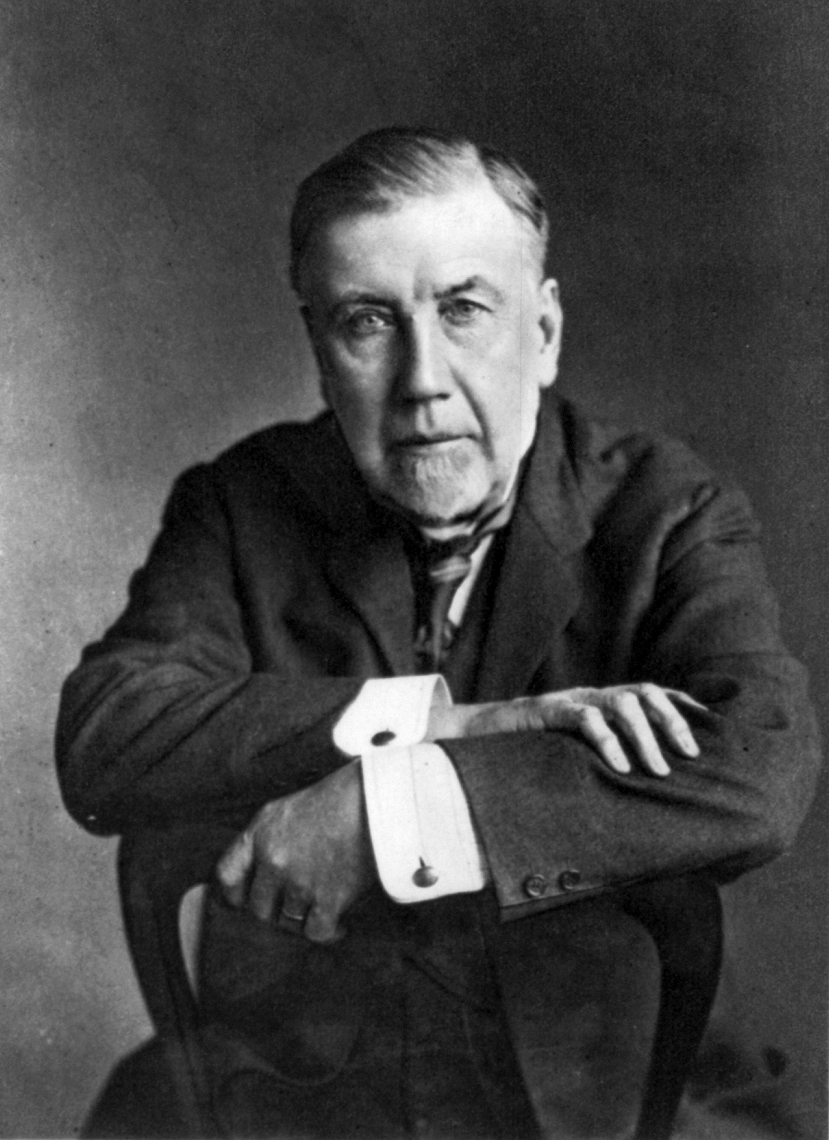
John Ross Robertson

The J. Ross Robertson Cup was donated by John Ross Robertson in 1899, to be awarded annually to the champion of the intermediate division in the Ontario Hockey Association (OHA). Robertson served as president of the OHA from 1899 to 1905, had founded the Toronto Evening Telegram, helped establish The Hospital for Sick Children, and served as a member of the House of Commons of Canada for Toronto East. He was against professionalism in sports, and felt that "sport should be pursued for its own sake, for when professionalism begins, true sport ends".

The OHA began the intermediate division for the 1896–97 season. Intermediate division players were rated between the senior and junior divisions. The Kingston Frontenacs team coached by James T. Sutherland won the first J. Ross Robertson Cup awarded to the intermediate hockey division in 1899. The J. Ross Robertson Cup continued to be awarded the OHA intermediate champion until the division was discontinued in 1934.

The J. Ross Robertson Cup was the second of three similarly named trophies Robertson donated to the OHA, which included the J. Ross Robertson Cup for the annual champions of the junior division, and the J. Ross Robertson Cup for the annual champions of senior division.

== List of cup winners ==
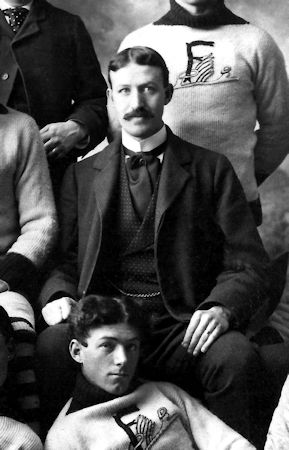
James T. Sutherland with the Kingston Frontenacs in 1899

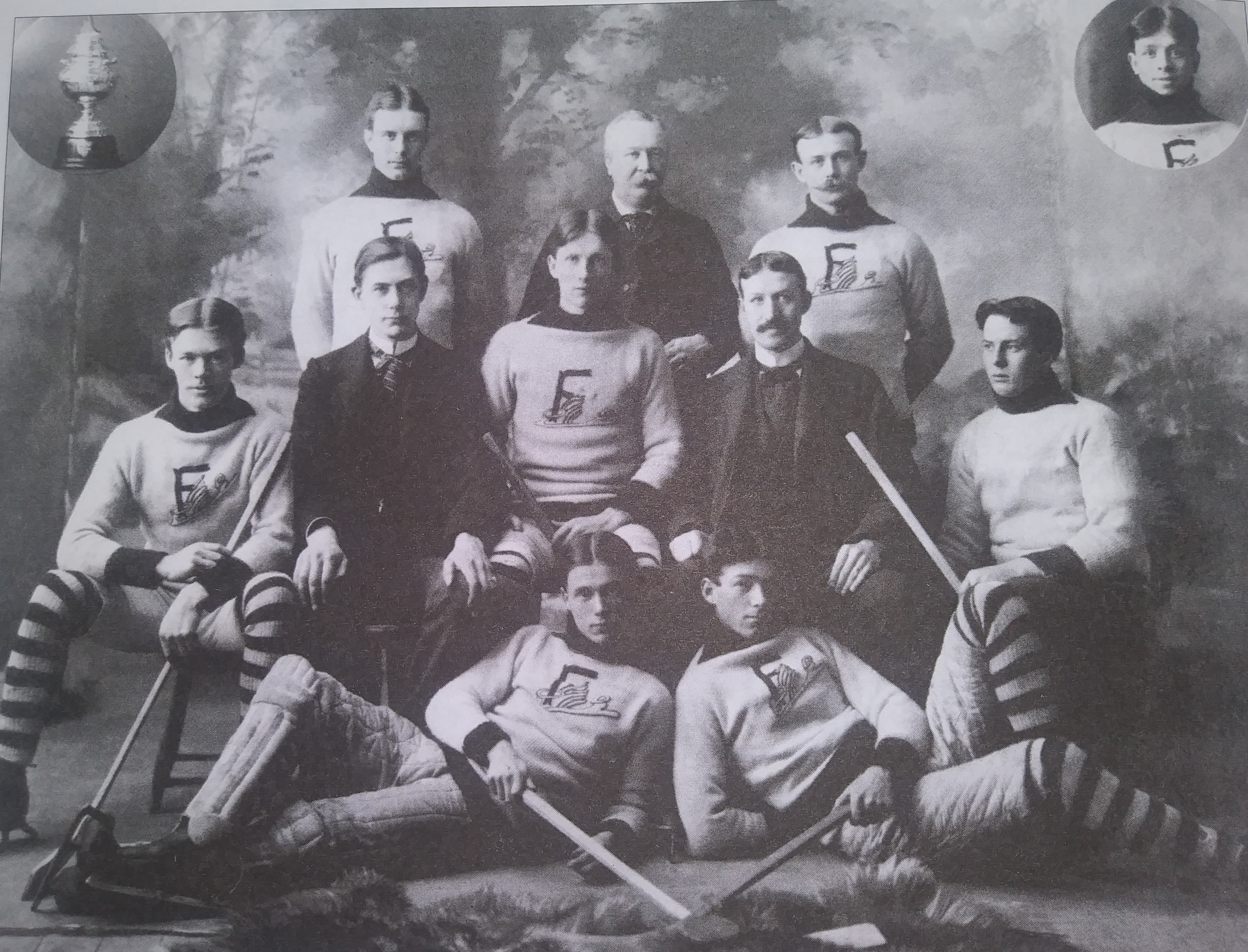
1898–99 Kingston Frontenacs intermediates and the J. Ross Robertson Cup (inset, upper left)

List of cup winners:

Year	Champion	Total goals	Finalist
1899	Kingston Frontenacs	5–2	Guelph National
1900	London	3–1	Belleville
1901	St. George's Toronto	10–8	Port Hope
1902	Peterborough	7–6	Galt
1903	Paris	12–7	Toronto Marlboros
1904	Stratford	13–11	Midland
1905	Victoria Harbour	9–6	Berlin
1906	Peterborough	14–8	Goderich
1907	Berlin	12–7	Collingwood
1908	Midland	23–20	Collingwood
1909	Lindsay	12–5	Stratford
1910	Collingwood	9–7	London
1911	Preston	12–10	Midland
1912	Preston	24–21	Midland
1913	Collingwood	19–9	London
1914	Berlin	5–3	Orillia
1915	Orillia	6–4	Wiarton
1916	Sarnia	19–18	Belleville
1917	Hamilton	9–6	Kitchener
1918	Collingwood	6–5	Oshawa
1919	Collingwood	9–6	Kingston
1920	Collingwood	16–3	Kingston
1921	Galt A.A.A.	7–4	Collingwood
1922	Kitchener	8–2	Niagara Falls
1923	Stratford	2–2	Guelph A.A.A.
1924	Niagara Falls	7–6	Peterborough
1925	Grimsby	11–4	Kingston
1926	New Hamburg	6–1	Grimsby
1927	London 12th Battery	3–0	Jordan
1928	Port Colborne	2–1	Kitchener-Waterloo
1929	Kitchener	6–3	Willowdale
1930	Paris	8–6	Walkerton
1931	Royal Military College	9–3	Chatham
1932	Windsor	5–4	Doherty A.C., Toronto
Year	Champion	Total games	Finalist
1933	Woodstock	2–1	Oakville
1934	Oakville	2–0	Oshawa
