= Frank Buckland (ice hockey) =

Canadian sports administrator

Frank Buckland

Francis Lawson Taylor Buckland (May 23, 1902 in Gravenhurst, Ontario – June 23, 1991) was a Canadian sports administrator.

Buckland helped lead the Ontario Hockey Association in the 1950s and 1960s. He was president and treasurer of the amateur organization for 21 years. He was inducted into the Hockey Hall of Fame in 1975.
