= Deseronto Bulldogs =

Canadian ice hockey team

The Deseronto Bulldogs were a Senior "AAA" ice hockey team based out of Deseronto, Ontario. They played in the Ontario Hockey Association's Eastern Ontario Senior Hockey League.
