= Wentworth Gryphins =

Senior ice hockey club

- City: Waterdown, Ontario
- League: Allan Cup Hockey League
- Founded: 2022
- Home arena: Harry Howell Arena
- Colours
- Owners: Rod Millard; Evan McGrath
- General manager: Mitchell Payne
- Head coach: Matt Beca
- Website: wentworthgryphins.ca

Championships
- League: 2025; 2026
- National: 2025

The Wentworth Gryphins are a senior ice hockey franchise in the Allan Cup Hockey League (ACH) based in Waterdown, Ontario. The team plays its home games at the Harry Howell Arena. The team was founded in 2022 and won its first Allan Cup in 2025, the Canadian senior hockey championship. The Gryphins won the J. Ross Robertson Cup (senior ice hockey) Ontario Sr. AAA championship back to back in 2025 & 2026.

Season-by-season record
Season	GP	W	L	OTL	Pts	GF	GA	PIM	Season	Postseason
2022–23	11	7	4	0	21	70	51	112	3rd overall	
2023–24	16	12	3	1	36	146	84	201	1st overall	
2024–25	12	9	2	1	27	-	-	-	1st overall	League champions National champions
2025–26	24	18	6	0	51	148	106	292	2nd overall	League champions

- "Allan Cup Hockey standings". stats.pointstreak.com. Pointstreak Sports Technologies.
- "ACH Award History". allancuphockey.ca. Allan Cup Hockey League. 11 September 2024.

== Sources ==
- "Stoney Creek Goes Back To Back". pointstreaksites.com. 10 April 2024.
- "Wentworth Gryphins get set to host Allan Cup Challenge at Waterdown arena". CHCH-TV. 25 March 2025.
- "Gryphins Crowned Champs". allancuphockey.ca. Allan Cup Hockey League. 29 March 2025.
- "The field is set for the 2025 Allan Cup Challenge". allancuphockey.ca. Allan Cup Hockey League. 31 March 2025.
- Arnold, Chris (13 April 2025). "Allan Cup action comes to Waterdown April 20-26". BurlingtonToday.com. Village Media.
- "Wentworth Gryphins open Allan Cup play with a win over St. John's". FlamboroughToday.com. Village Media. 21 April 2025.
- "Wentworth Gryphins halt Dundas Real McCoys' Allan Cup reign". FlamboroughToday.com. Village Media. 24 April 2025.
- Bell, Adam (25 April 2025). "Minto 81's look to book spot in Allan Cup Challenge final". cknxnewstoday.ca. Blackburn Media.
- Best, John; Gibbons, Denis (25 April 2025). "Storied Conacher name prominent in Allan Cup Tourney in Waterdown". bayobserver.ca.
- "Gryphins Capture First Allan Cup Championship". allancuphockey.ca (Press release). Allan Cup Hockey League. 26 April 2025.
- "Clarenville Caribous Drop Allan Cup Final Game". VOCM. Stingray Radio. 27 April 2025.
- "Gryphins soar to win over Clarenville to bring home the Allan Cup". FlamboroughToday.com. Village Media. 27 April 2025.
- Radley, Scott (14 August 2025). "Wentworth's championship keeps Allan Cup in Hamilton area". The Hamilton Spectator. Metroland Media Group.
- Zehner, Karen (16 September 2025). "Chandler Romeo Joins Wentworth Gryphins for 2025-26 Season". Inside The Rink.
- Marasco, Mike (5 April 2026). "Back-to-Back: Gryphins Defend the Robertson Cup". allancuphockey.ca. Allan Cup Hockey League.
