= Cosby Cup =

Canadian ice hockey trophy

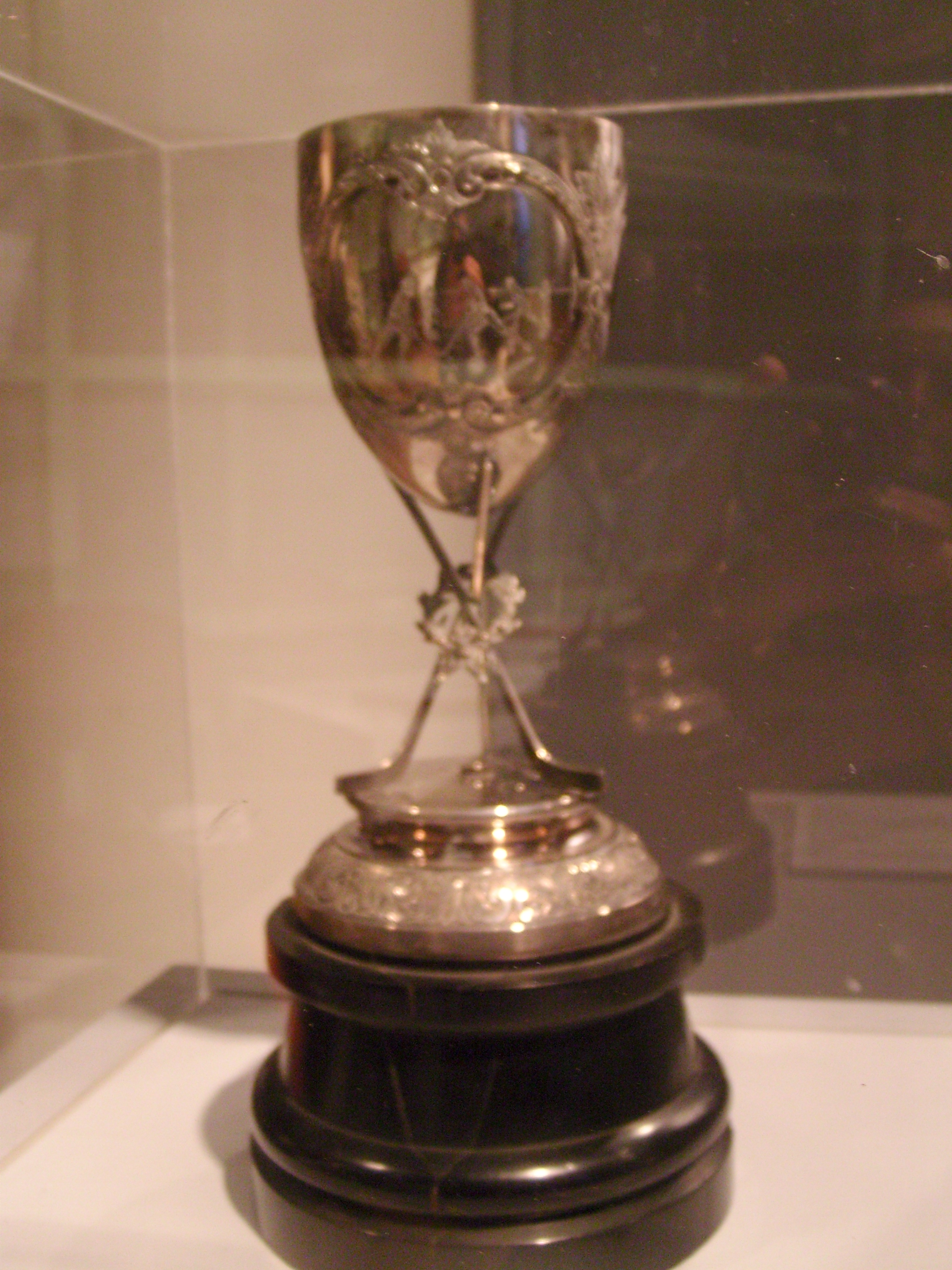
Cosby Cup, on display at Ottawa City Hall, January 2009

The Cosby Cup was the trophy given to the champions of the Ontario Hockey Association from its founding in 1890 until its replacement in 1899 by the J. Ross Robertson Cup for senior ice hockey.

== History ==
The Cosby Cup was donated by businessman A. Morgan Cosby. The OHA playoffs at the time consisted of play-downs from a limited number of teams. At the start, there was Lindsay, Ottawa, Kingston Queen's University, Toronto Osgoode Hall, Toronto St. George's and Toronto Granites. These were the only teams of the OHA upon its founding, but the league started adding divisions in 1896, splitting into junior, intermediate and senior.

The Cosby Cup was awarded to the senior champions until the John Ross Robertson trophies were donated in 1899. The Cosby Cup was given permanently to Queen's University.

== Winners ==
Season	Team	Runner-up	Score	Location
1891	Ottawa Hockey Club	Toronto St. George's	5–0	Ottawa
1892	Ottawa Hockey Club	Toronto Osgoode Hall	10–4	Toronto
1893	Ottawa Hockey Club	Toronto Granites	default	
1894	Toronto Osgoode Hall	Kingston Queen's University	3–2	Toronto
1895	Kingston Queen's University	Toronto Trinity College	17–3	Toronto
1896	Kingston Queen's University	Stratford	12–3	Toronto
1897	Kingston Queen's University	University of Toronto	12–7 (6–1,6–6)	
1898	Toronto Osgoode Hall			
1899	Kingston Queen's University			

== References and notes ==
- Podnieks, Andrew; Hockey Hall of Fame (2005). Silverware. Bolton, Ontario: Fenn Publishing Company. ISBN 1-55168-296-6.
