= Orillia Tundras =

- City: Orillia, Ontario
- League: Major League Hockey
- Founded: 2007
- Home arena: West Orillia Sports Complex
- Colours: Red, Black, and Black
- President: Tom Ruff

Franchise history
- 2007: Cooks Bay Canucks
- 2007-2008: Simcoe County Canucks
- 2008: Simcoe County Tundras
- 2008-2010: Coldwater/Orillia Tundras
- 2010-2013: Orillia Tundras

Orillia Tundras were a senior ice hockey team from Orillia, Ontario, Canada. The team last played in the 2012–13 season in the Allan Cup Hockey league. They competed for the Allan Cup.

== History ==
Initially, the Cooks Bay Canucks attempted to join the Western Ontario Athletic Association Senior Hockey League, but their application was rejected by the league. They then applied for expansion in Eastern Ontario Senior Hockey League and were accepted. The team started the 2007-08 season as the Cooks Bay Canucks but were renamed the Simcoe County Canucks after they started to play their home games in the Coldwater and District Community Centre. At that time a new owner and management group became involved and at the second game of the playoff series with the Frankford Huskies, they announced a sponsorship deal with Sunrise Toyota, a local Toyota dealership and the renaming of the team as the Simcoe County Tundras. The team has renamed itself as Orillia-Coldwater to avoid press confusion in regards to Simcoe County and the municipality of Simcoe since leaving the EOSHL and joining the new Major League Hockey. For the 2010-11 season the team moved full-time to Orillia playing at Rotary Place rink of the new West Orillia Sports Complex

== Season-by-season record ==
Note: GP = Games played, W = Wins, L = Losses, T = Ties, OTL = Overtime losses, Pts = Points, GF = Goals for, GA = Goals against

Season	GP	W	L	T	OTL	GF	GA	P	Results	Playoffs
2007-08	28	15	11	-	2	171	143	32	2nd EOSHL	Lost Final
2008-09	28	4	22	-	2	125	189	10	6th MLH	DNQ
2009-10	24	2	19	-	3	85	162	7	4th MLH	DNQ
2010-11	24	9	15	-	0	105	133	18	5th MLH	DNQ
2011-12	28	11	15	-	2	123	162	24	4th ACH	
2012-13	24	7	17	-	0	82	130	14	4th ACH	
