= J. Ross Robertson Cup (senior ice hockey) =

Canadian ice hockey trophy

- Sport: Ice hockey
- League: Allan Cup Hockey
- Competition: Ontario Hockey Association
- Awarded for: Playoffs champion
- Country: Canada

History
- First award: 1898–99
- First winner: Queen's University
- Most wins: Dundas Real McCoys (8)
- Most recent: Wentworth Gryphins (2026)

The J. Ross Robertson Cup is a Canadian ice hockey trophy. It is awarded annually in senior ice hockey to the champion of Allan Cup Hockey by the Ontario Hockey Association (OHA). It was donated by John Ross Robertson in 1899, and is the first of three similarly named trophies he established. His other eponymous trophies for the OHA include, the J. Ross Robertson Cup awarded to the annual champions of the junior division, and the J. Ross Robertson Cup which was formerly awarded to the annual champions of the intermediate division.

== History ==
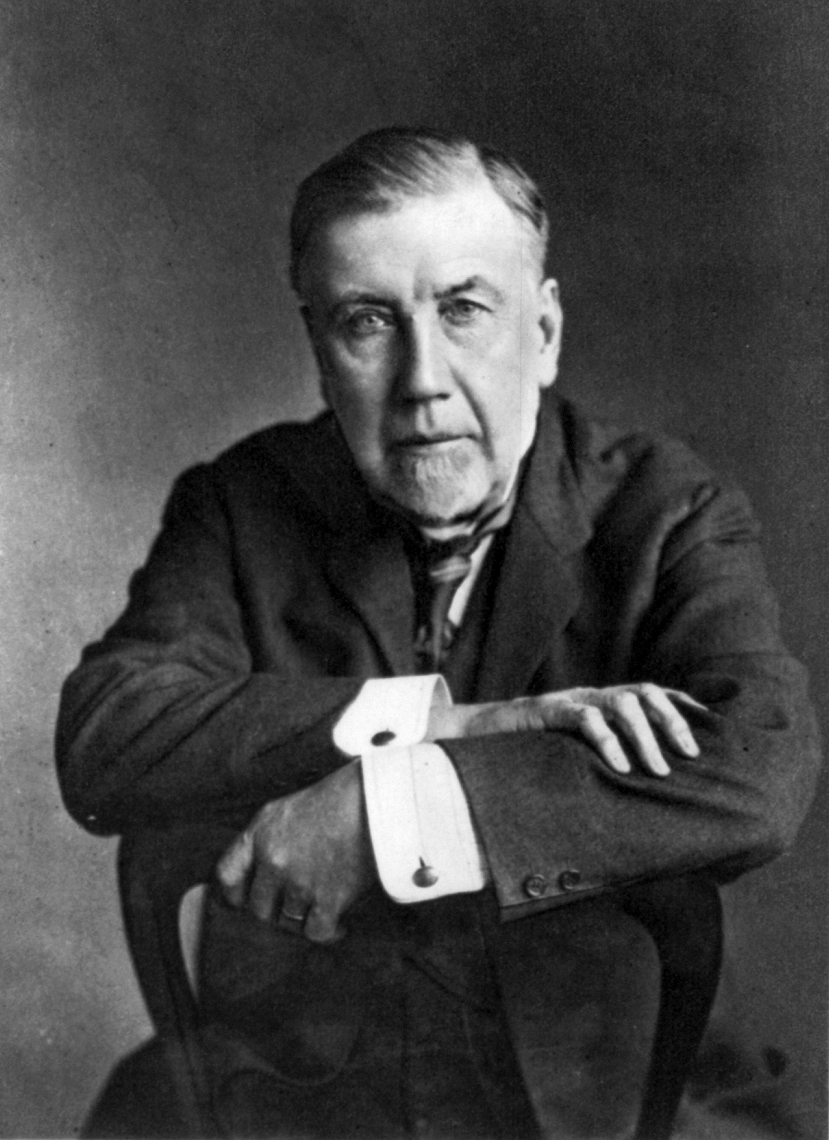
John Ross Robertson

The J. Ross Robertson Cup was donated by John Ross Robertson on December 3, 1898, to be awarded annually to the champion of the senior ice hockey division in the Ontario Hockey Association (OHA). Robertson served as president of the OHA from 1899 to 1905, had founded the Toronto Evening Telegram, helped establish The Hospital for Sick Children, and served as a member of the House of Commons of Canada for Toronto East. He was against professionalism in sports. In his donation speech he said, that would help "our boys to be strong, vigorous and self-reliant", and that "sport should be pursued for its own sake, for when professionalism begins, true sport ends".

The J. Ross Robertson Cup is 47 centimetres (19 in) in height. It was crafted by the Queen's silversmiths in London, and is made of sterling silver and lined with gold. The bowl is decorated with faces of lions and has three handles shaped as leopards. Each winning team receives its own shield on the plinth, with the player's names engraved on it. The J. Ross Robertson Cup replaced the Cosby Cup as of the 1898–99 season, and its first winner was Queen's University. The Toronto Granites who won the cup in 1922 and 1923, then won gold in ice hockey at the 1924 Winter Olympics.

The J. Ross Robertson Cup was the first of three similarly named trophies Robertson donated to the OHA, which included the J. Ross Robertson Cup for the annual champions of the junior division, and the J. Ross Robertson Cup for the annual champions of intermediate division.

== List of cup winners ==
Championship trophy of:

- OHA Senior A League (1899 to 1979)
- OHA Senior Series (1980)
- OHA Senior A Hockey League (1981 to 1987)
- Allan Cup Hockey (2002 to present)

List of cup winners:

Year	Champion	Total goals	Finalist
1899	Queen's University	19–11	University of Toronto
1900	Toronto Wellingtons	6–4	Queen's University
1901	Toronto Wellingtons	7–2	Queen's University
1902	Toronto Wellingtons	12–6	Cornwall
1903	Toronto Wellingtons	6–5	Cornwall
1904	Toronto Marlboros	28–9	Perth Crescents
1905	Toronto Marlboros	9–3	Smiths Falls
1906	Berlin	5–4	Toronto Argonauts
1907	Stratford Indians	8–6	14th Regiment, Kingston
1908	14th Regiment, Kingston	13–9	Stratford Indians
1909	St. Michael's College, Toronto	23–17	14th Regiment, Kingston
1910	St. Michael's College, Toronto	6–5	Parkdale Canoe Club, Toronto
1911	Toronto Eaton's	10–7	Toronto Argonauts
1912	Toronto Eaton's	16–12	Kingston Frontenacs
1913	Toronto R. & A. A.	10–8	St. Michael's College, Toronto
1914	Toronto R. & A. A.	9–7	St. Michael's College, Toronto
1915	Toronto Victorias	4–3	St. Michael's College, Toronto
1916	Toronto Riversides	12–4	Berlin
1917	Toronto Dentals	5–2	Toronto Riversides
1918	Kitchener Greenshirts	7–4	Toronto Dentals
1919	Hamilton Tigers	11–8	Toronto St. Patrick's
1920	Toronto Granites	6–2	Hamilton Tigers
1921	University of Toronto	7-3	Toronto Granites
1922	Toronto Granites	16–5	Toronto Aura Lee
1923	Toronto Granites	6–4	Hamilton A. A. A.
1924	Hamilton A.A.A.	4–3	Stratford Indians
1925	Niagara Falls Cataracts	5–3	Peterborough
1926	Peterborough	7–5	London Ravens
1927	University of Toronto Grads	9–3	Kitchener Greenshirts
1928	Kitchener Greenshirts	5–4	University of Toronto
1929	University of Toronto	9–5	Queen's University
1930	University of Toronto	3–2	Toronto National Sea Fleas
1931	Hamilton Tigers	5–3	Port Colborne Sailors
1932	Toronto National Sea Fleas	4–1	Port Colborne Sailors
Year	Champion	Total games	Finalist
1933	Niagara Falls Cataracts	2-1	Port Colborne Sailors
1934	Hamilton Tigers	2-0	Niagara Falls Cataracts
1935	Toronto All-stars	2-0	Hamilton Tigers
1936	Hamilton Tigers	2-0	Niagara Falls Cataracts
1937	Toronto Dominions	3-2	Toronto Goodyears
1938	Toronto Goodyears	3-1	Port Colborne Sailors
1939	Toronto Goodyears	3-0	Oshawa G-Men
1940	Toronto Goodyears	3-0	St. Catharines Saints
1941	Toronto Marlboros	4-2	St. Catharines Saints
1942	Hamilton Majors	3-1	St. Catharines Saints
1943	Toronto RCAF	3-1	Toronto Navy
1944	Hamilton Majors	4-1	St. Catharines Saints
1945	Hamilton Majors	4-1	St. Catharines Saints
1946	Hamilton Tigers	4-1	Toronto Staffords
1947	Hamilton Tigers	3-2	Owen Sound Mohawks
1948	Hamilton Tigers	4-1	Kitchener-Waterloo Dutchmen
1949	Toronto Marlboros	4-2	Kitchener-Waterloo Dutchmen
1950	Toronto Marlboros	4-2	Kitchener-Waterloo Dutchmen
1951	Owen Sound Mercurys	4-2	Sarnia Sailors
1952	Stratford Indians	4-3	Owen Sound Mercurys
1953	Kitchener-Waterloo Dutchmen	4-2	Owen Sound Mercurys
1954	Owen Sound Mercurys	4-0	Stratford Indians
1955	Kitchener-Waterloo Dutchmen	4-1	Windsor Bulldogs
1956	Chatham Maroons	4-0	Kitchener-Waterloo Dutchmen
1957	Whitby Dunlops	4-3	Kitchener-Waterloo Dutchmen
1958	Belleville McFarlands	4-1	Kitchener-Waterloo Dutchmen
1959	Whitby Dunlops	4-1	Kitchener-Waterloo Dutchmen
1960	Chatham Maroons	4-2	Windsor Bulldogs
1961	Galt Terriers	4-0	Windsor Bulldogs
1962	Windsor Bulldogs	4-3	Chatham Maroons
1963	Windsor Bulldogs	4-2	Chatham Maroons
1964	Woodstock Athletics	4-2	Galt Hornets
1965	Woodstock Athletics	4-0	Collingwood Shipbuilders
1966	Guelph Regals	4-0	Collingwood Shipbuilders
1967	Kingston Aces	4-1	Woodstock Athletics
1968	Toronto Marlboros	4-3	Galt Hornets
1969	Galt Hornets	3-0	Barrie Flyers
1970	Orillia Terriers	4-2	Galt Hornets
1971	Galt Hornets	4-1	Orillia Terriers
1972	Barrie Flyers	4-2	Galt Hornets
1973	Orillia Terriers	4-2	Barrie Flyers
1974	Barrie Flyers	4-1	Orillia Terriers
1975	Barrie Flyers	4-0	Lucan-Ilderton Jets
1976	Barrie Flyers	4-0	Durham Huskies
1977	Brantford Alexanders	4-2	Woodstock Gems
1978	Brantford Alexanders	4-2	London Kings
1979	Petrolia Squires	4-2	Thunder Bay Twins
1980	Cambridge Hornets	4-3	Petrolia Squires
1981	Petrolia Squires	4-1	Cambridge Hornets
1982	Petrolia Squires	4-3	Cambridge Hornets
1983	Cambridge Hornets	4-3	Petrolia Squires
1984	Cambridge Hornets	4-2	Petrolia Squires
1985	Dundas Tigers	4-2	Flamborough Motts Clamatos
1986	Flamborough Motts Clamatos	4-0	Dundas Tigers
1987	Brantford Motts Clamatos	4-3	Dundas Tigers
Cup not awarded from 1988 to 2001
2002	Dundas Real McCoys	4–1	Cambridge Hornets
2003	Dundas Real McCoys	4–1	Cambridge Hornets
2004	Aylmer Blues	4–2	Tillsonburg Vipers
2005	Aylmer Blues	4–1	Dundas Real McCoys
2006	Whitby Dunlops	3–1	Dundas Real McCoys
2007	Whitby Dunlops	4–0	Brantford Blast
2008	Whitby Dunlops	4–0	Dundas Real McCoys
2009	Dundas Real McCoys	4–0	Whitby Dunlops
2010	Dundas Real McCoys	4–1	Whitby Dunlops
2011	Dundas Real McCoys	4–3	Norwood Vipers
2012	Dundas Real McCoys	4–3	Whitby Dunlops
2013	Brantford Blast	4–2	Dundas Real McCoys
2014	Brantford Blast	4–2	Dundas Real McCoys
2015	Dundas Real McCoys	4–2	Brantford Blast
2016	Stoney Creek Generals	4–1	Brantford Blast
2017	Stoney Creek Generals	4–1	Whitby Dunlops
2018	Stoney Creek Generals	4–1	Whitby Dunlops
2019	Stoney Creek Generals	4–0	Whitby Dunlops
Cup not awarded in 2020 or 2021 due to the COVID-19 pandemic in Canada
2022	Dundas Real McCoys	2–1	Hamilton Steelhawks
2023	Hamilton Steelers	2–0	Dundas Real McCoys
2024	Stoney Creek Tigers	2–1	Wentworth Gryphins
2025	Wentworth Gryphins	2-0	Dundas Real McCoys
2026	Wentworth Gryphins	3-2	Stoney Creek Tigers
