= Northern Premier Hockey League =

Senior ice hockey league

- Current season or competition: 2025–26 season
- Countries: Canada
- Regions: Eastern Ontario; Windsor area
- Former name: Eastern Ontario Super Hockey League
- Founded: 2019
- Divisions: 6
- Conferences: 2
- No. of teams: 25
- Most successful club: Whitby Dunlops
- Website: nphlhockey.ca

The Northern Premier Hockey League is a senior ice hockey league with 25 franchises spread throughout 2 member leagues based in Eastern Ontario and the Windsor area.

== History ==
The EOSHL became a sanctioned Senior "A" league in 2003. In 2005, the league was promoted to Senior "AAA" to compete against the Major League Hockey (MLH) league and have a chance to win the Allan Cup. In 2006, the league dropped from six to four teams.

During the 2007-08 season, a new team known as the Cooks Bay Canucks joined the league. Although successful on the ice, the Canucks underwent two name changes in the same season. The team started the season as the Cooks Bay Canucks, but was soon renamed to the Simcoe County Canucks. The Canucks made the playoffs and before game two of the league semi-final, they announced another name change to the Simcoe County Tundras, with new logos, and completely different jerseys and team colours.

The Eastern Ontario Senior Hockey League merged with Major League Hockey in 2008, when AAA-level senior hockey in the OHA shrunk to only five teams.

The league split off from Allan Cup Hockey and incorporated as the Eastern Ontario Super Hockey League (EOSHL) ahead of the 2019–20 season with 4 teams: Cornwall Senior Prowlers, West Carleton Rivermen, Maxville Millionaires and Deseronto Bulldogs.

In 2024, the EOSHL added 2 new teams: Westport Lumberjacks and Lindsay Barncats, and relocated its new Manotick and Pontiac franchises.

By April 2024, the EOSHL came under new ownership by Jon Zinck and Joshua Rowlands and was subsequently rebranded to the Northern Premier Hockey League (NPHL). All of the prior EOSHL franchises were reorganized into the NPHL umbrella as the Capital League. 2025 also saw the relocation of the new Akwesasne, Tamworth, and Shawville franchises, and the introduction of 2 new teams to the Capital League: County Royals and Durham Devils.

In 2025, the NPHL also added a second league under its umbrella, the Metropolitan League, in the Windsor, Ontario area.

== Teams (Capital League) ==
The Capital League has 17 teams as of the 2025-26 NPHL season.

Capital League Teams
Division	Team	Location	Home Arena
East Conference
Frontier Division	Akwesasne Wild	Kawehnò:ke (Cornwall Island), Akwesasne, ON	A'nowara'ko:wa Arena (“Turtle Dome”)
Frontier Division	North Dundas Rockets	Chesterville, ON	Chesterville & District Arena
Frontier Division	Smiths Falls Rideaus	Smiths Falls, ON	Smiths Falls Memorial Community Centre
Frontier Division	South Grenville Rangers	Prescott, ON	Alaine Chartrand Arena
Frontier Division	South Stormont Mustangs	South Stormont, ON	Long Sault Arena
Pioneer Division	Arnprior Rivermen	Arnprior, ON	Nick Smith Centre
Pioneer Division	Madawaska Valley Wolves	Barry's Bay, ON	Paul J. Yakabuski Community Centre
Pioneer Division	Paugan Falls Rapids	Low, QC	Gatineau Valley Arena
Pioneer Division	Shawville Pontiacs	Shawville, QC	Shawville Arena
West Conference
Heritage Division	Deseronto Bulldogs	Deseronto, ON	Deseronto Community Recreation Centre
Heritage Division	Tamworth Sabres	Tamworth, ON	Stone Mills Recreation Centre
Heritage Division	Tweed Oil Kings	Tweed, ON	Tweed-Hungerford Community Centre
Heritage Division	Westport Lumberjacks	Westport, ON	Westport Community Arena
Highlands Division	The County Royals	Picton / Wellington, ON	Prince Edward Community Centre / Wellington & District Community Centre
Highlands Division	Durham Hawks	Clarington, ON	South Courtice Arena
Highlands Division	Lindsay Barncats	Lindsay, ON	Lindsay Recreation Centre
Highlands Division	Norwood Rams	Norwood, ON	Asphodel-Norwood Community Centre

== Teams (Metropolitan League) ==
The Metropolitan League has 8 teams as of the 2025-26 NPHL season.

Metropolitan League Teams
Division	Team	Location	Home Arena
North Conference
Loyalist Division	Brant County Riverhawks	Burford, ON	Burford Community Centre
Loyalist Division	Halton Hills Coyotes	Acton, ON	Acton Community Centre
Loyalist Division	Six Nations Ironmen	Ohsweken, ON	Gaylord Powless Arena
Loyalist Division	Woodstock Lakers	Woodstock, ON	Southwood Arena
South Conference
Gateway Division	Alvinston Killer Bees	Brooke-Alvinston, ON	Brooke-Alvinston-Inwood Community Centre
Gateway Division	Stratford Irish	Stratford, ON	William Allman Memorial Arena
Gateway Division	Strathroy Jets	Strathroy, ON	Gemini Sportsplex
Gateway Division	Tilbury Bluebirds	Tilbury, ON	Tilbury and District Memorial Community Centre

== Champions ==
2008 Whitby Dunlops
2007 Whitby Dunlops
2006 Whitby Dunlops
2005 Norwood Vipers
2004 Belleville Macs

Bolded teams were the winners of the J. Ross Robertson Cup as Ontario Hockey Association champions.

== League Map ==
Locations of teams in the Northern Premier Hockey League (NPHL)
Capital League:
Frontier
Pioneer
Heritage
Highlands
Metropolitan League:
Loyalist
Gateway
