= Ontario Hockey Association =

Canadian ice hockey governing body

Ontario Hockey Association logo

The Ontario Hockey Association (OHA) is the governing body for the majority of junior and senior level ice hockey teams in the province of Ontario. Founded in 1890, the OHA is sanctioned by the Ontario Hockey Federation along with the Northern Ontario Hockey Association. Other Ontario sanctioning bodies along with the OHF include the Hockey Eastern Ontario and Hockey Northwestern Ontario. The OHA controls three tiers of junior hockey; the "Tier 2 Junior "A", Junior "B", Junior "C", and one senior hockey league, Allan Cup Hockey.

In 1980, the Ontario Major Junior Hockey League vacated what was known as Tier I Junior "A" hockey. The league is now known as the Ontario Hockey League. Although it is not a charter member of the OHA, the OHL is affiliated with the OHA and Ontario Hockey Federation.

== History ==
=== Founding ===
The OHA was founded in 1890 to govern amateur ice hockey play in Ontario. This was the idea of Arthur Stanley, son of Lord Stanley, then Governor General of Canada. Arthur played for the Ottawa 'Rideau Hall Rebels' and in the course of exhibition play against other teams in Ontario, convinced team officials to hold a meeting in November 1890 to discuss the idea. On November 27, 1890, at the Queen's Hotel in Toronto, delegates from hockey clubs around Ontario formed the Ontario Hockey Association.

The first executive was:

- A. Morgan Cosby, Toronto Victoria Club, president,
- John Barron, vice-president,
- Henry Ward, vice-president,
- C. K. Temple, Toronto St. George's Club, treasurer,
- C. R. Hamilton, Toronto Victoria Club, secretary

=== Early history ===
In the beginning, the OHA had one league of senior men's hockey teams. This group included teams from Ottawa, Kingston, Toronto, and London. In the first years, the schedule consisted of this group playing a series of elimination playoffs leading to a single-game final playoff. For the first three years the Ottawa Hockey Club was the champions, winners of the Cosby Cup. In 1894, the Ottawa team and the Association came to a disagreement over the venue of the finals, and Ottawa left the league. This was a schism that would lead to the forming of the Ottawa District Hockey Association, governing most of eastern Ontario ice hockey play.

The Memorial Cup

In 1892, the junior-level was introduced for play at a lower level. It was not age-limited to young men under the age of 20 until 1896, when the OHA introduced the 'intermediate'-level play bracket. In 1919, the Memorial Cup was introduced, first called the 'OHA Memorial Cup', and was first won by University of Toronto Schools (UTS). It became the national championship trophy for junior-level play.

In 1897, the intermediate level was introduced. This was to organize teams of a lower standard than the seniors. The first champions were Berlin, defeating the Frontenacs 3–0.

==== Stanley Cup ====
From 1893 to 1908, teams from the OHA could and did challenge for the Stanley Cup, including:

- Ottawa Hockey Club (was in both AHAC and OHA),
- Queen's University of Kingston,
- Toronto Marlboros,
- Toronto Wellingtons

As senior-level play became professional, Stanley Cup challenges by the amateur clubs ceased, having been banned from play against professionals. After the introduction of the Allan Cup in 1908, clubs from the OHA would compete for that instead. The Ontario Professional Hockey League started to play in 1908 for senior-level men's pro hockey teams in Ontario. Champions of the OPHL would continue to challenge for the Stanley Cup. The senior-level men's league of the OHA is today composed of the six teams of Allan Cup Hockey.

=== 1920s to 1970s ===
In 1924, the OHA voted to keep its ban on professional coaches in amateur hockey. When Queen's University at Kingston hired a full-time athletic director, OHA secretary W. A. Hewitt felt that the OHA should allow the director's involvement with the hockey team despite him being a paid professional. Hewitt proposed an amendment to the constitution which would allow the executive to scrutinize any coach and decide on the registration. The amendment was rejected by delegates who remained against any professionals in the OHA. Two years later, Hewitt brought up the issue again and argued that, "the original intention of this rule was to control the [professional] coach, not exterminate him". His constitutional amendment was subsequently approved in the late-1920s.

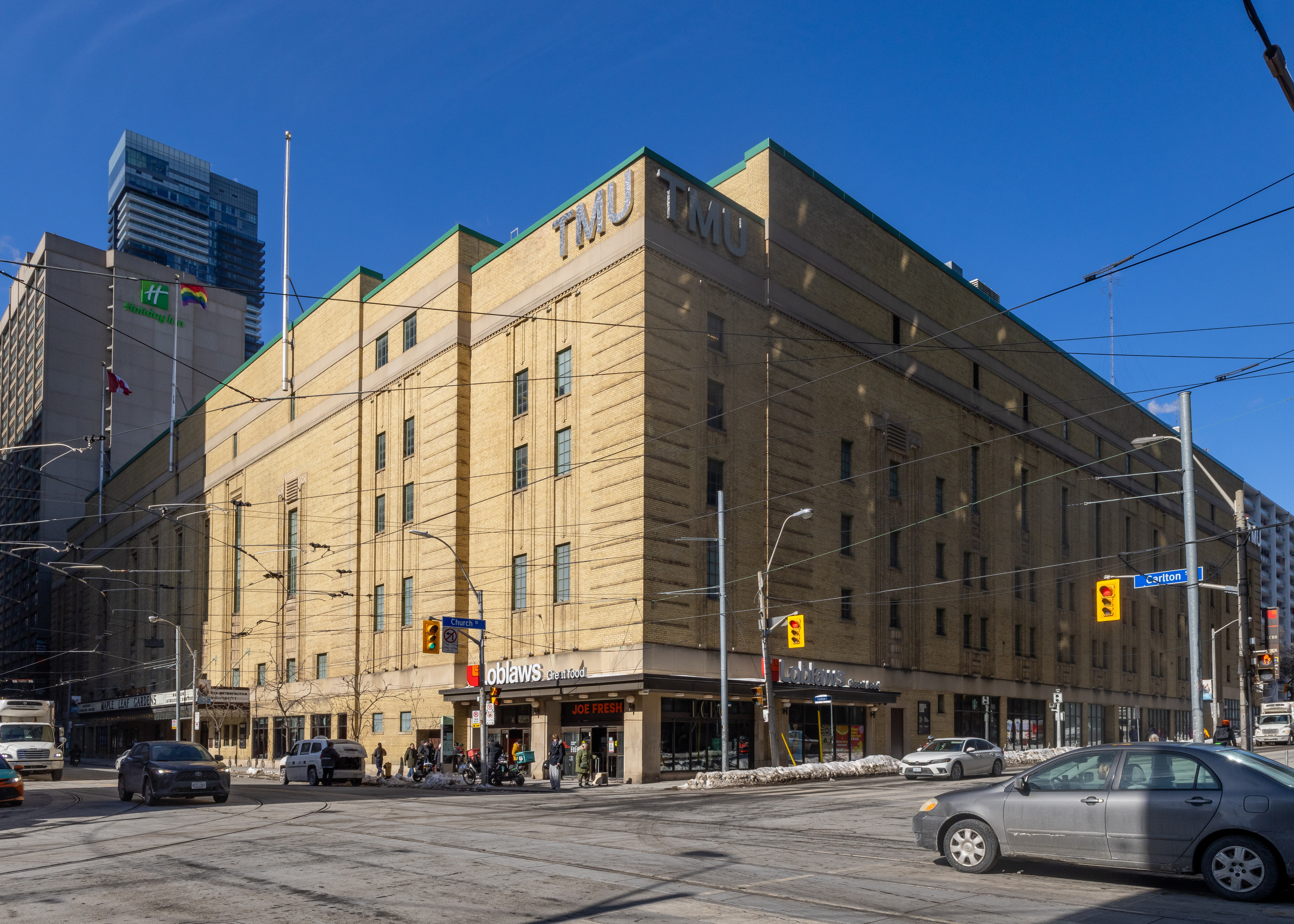
Maple Leaf Gardens

When the OHA contract with Arena Gardens was up for renewal in the late-1920s, some executives preferred the Ravina Gardens where teams could get 50 per cent of the gate receipts, compared to only 35 per cent of the gate receipts at the Arena Gardens. Hewitt argued that 35 per cent of a larger arena in an established part of the city would be more profitable than 50 per cent of a smaller arena under construction in a newer part of the city. Hewitt promised to negotiate a better deal, in exchange for the contract with Arena Gardens to be renewed on a year-by-year basis. The OHA signed multiple five-year contracts with Maple Leaf Gardens, in which all Toronto-based teams in the OHA played home games at the arena, except for the University of Toronto teams.

=== 1980s to present ===
The trophy emblematic of Canadian Intermediate Hockey supremacy was the Hardy Cup. Only three teams from Ontario ever won the Hardy Cup (that ran from 1968 to 1990), two from the OHA: Georgetown Raiders in 1982 and Dundas Real McCoys in 1986. The third Ontario team was the Embrun Panthers of the Ottawa District Hockey Association. The intermediate classification was abolished in 1983 by the OHA. The top league, Major Intermediate A Hockey League was divided between the OHA Senior A Hockey League and the various Senior B leagues.

In September 1985, the Supreme Court of Ontario ruled against an appeal for a girl to play in the OHA, stating that the Canadian Charter of Rights and Freedoms was not violated since the OHA was a private organization. In June 1986, the Court of Appeal for Ontario overturned the decision which was then upheled by the Supreme Court of Canada. The OHA's position had been that girls could not play on a boys' team when equal opportunity existed to play on a girls' team in her geographic area.

The OHA Senior A Hockey League ceased operations after the 1986–87 season, when it was reduced to three teams and the OHA was unable to find new teams. The league had become cost-prohibitive, and needed to cut costs and restructure senior ice hockey to compete for the Allan Cup.

During the summer in 1989, the Metro Toronto Hockey League (MTHL) and the Ontario Minor Hockey Association (OMHA), broke away from the OHA and formed the Central Canada Hockey Association, due to disagreement with an OHA restructuring proposal which would have limited their voting powers. The dispute ended when the Ontario Hockey Federation (OHF) was established, with equal representation for the OHA, Northern Ontario Hockey Association, MTHL, and OMHA. The OHF was given the mandate to oversee hockey in Ontario, and be a review panel for three years to propose further restructuring if necessary.

The OHA established bursaries as of the 1995–96 season, to counter the loss of players to scholarships in the United States. The OHA awarded the bursaries to students chosen to attend the University of Windsor, University of Waterloo, and Wilfrid Laurier University.

==== On-ice violence ====
In 1986, the Ontario Hockey Association, concerned with growing violence in hockey, suspended the Streetsville Derbys and the Brantford Classics from playing in the 1986–87 season. The suspension of the Derbys had to do with a stick-swinging incident in the final game of the league quarter-final against the Nobleton Devils. A Nobleton player was struck in the back of the head with a two-hand slash, which also struck a linesman and cut his eyelid. Brantford's suspension was related to a violent playoff brawl against the St. Catharines Falcons.

In 1987, the Port Elgin Bears withdrew from a Western Ontario Junior C Hockey League playoffs series due to perceived on-ice violence by the Hanover Barons. The OHA investigated the incident, which received national publicity when Port Elgin's coach was supported by Otto Jelinek, the Canadian Minister of State for Fitness and Amateur Sport. Port Elgin team officials were given one-year suspensions when the OHA found no evidence to justify abandoning the series.

==== Hazing incidents ====
When 13 people from the Tilbury Hawks were charged with sex-related crimes in 1994, the OHA sought to eliminate hazing from and suspended the team's officials for one year. Team trainer Paul Everaert and captain Ed Fiala pleaded guilty to their charges and were fined a total of $6,000. The team was forced out of Tilbury by the end of the 1993–94 season, relocating to Walpole Island and folding in 1999. The team was a part of an investigation and subject matter of an episode of The Fifth Estate.

In 1997, parents of players on the Kingsville Comets spoke out against hazing and campaigned for its end. The OHA stated it must educate its teams and players annually on acceptable practices to prevent incidents and change future behaviour. Each team was required to have a youth worker serving as a prevention services co-ordinator; and handbooks were given to players annually which covered hazing, alcohol, drug use, tobacco, and sexual harassment. The OHA then requested that the Canadian Amateur Hockey Association (CAHA) include the education in coaching certification programs, and for it to be available to all hockey administrators.

==== Restructuring junior hockey ====
The Ontario Hockey League (OHL) split from the OHA in July 1982. The OHA and OHL disagreed on financial terms of affiliation, then the OHL decided to handle its own administration. The OHA and the OHL later reached an interim affiliation agreement, which allowed the OHL to compete at the Memorial Cup.

In 1993, the Metro Junior B Hockey League and Central Junior B Hockey League, the OHA's two Toronto-area Junior B leagues, were officially recognized by the OHA as Junior A Leagues. The three remaining leagues, the Mid-Western Junior Hockey League, Western Ontario Hockey League, and Golden Horseshoe Junior Hockey League, who had been more dominant than their Toronto-area sister leagues in the Sutherland Cup department, were left to their own devices.

The Metro Junior A Hockey League (MetJHL) operated independent from the OHA as of the 1995–96 season, when it was opposed to a ruling by the CAHA which gave jurisdiction over junior hockey in the province to the OHA. Several teams departed the MetJHL to join the Ontario Provincial Junior A Hockey League (OPJHL) which was affiliated with the OHA. The MetJHL insisted on its own administration and was opposed to paying fees to the OHA. The MetJHL rejoined the OHA in 1997, then merged into the OPJHL in 1998.

In 2001, the OHA appointed Vern Stenlund as its first "master mentor coach", to improve the quality of coaching and the player experience in junior hockey.

In 2007, the three Southwestern Ontario leagues opted to merge to form a 27-team superleague, the Greater Ontario Junior Hockey League in hopes of eventually being promoted to Junior A and to attempt to prevent player poaching from the 37-team Ontario Provincial Junior A Hockey League.

OHA president Brent Ladds led the study "Tomorrow's Game" to help teams manage their finances and volunteers, which began in 2006 as a survey of teams and leagues to assess priorities and gather recommendations. The study also proposed restructuring junior hockey as of the 2010–11 season, which would have reclassified teams from A to D levels, into a premier league and two developmental leagues. Teams in the proposed premier league would have been required to employ a full-time coach, doctor, nutritionist, and athletic trainers. Ladds felt that junior hockey in Ontario needed to be more attractive to players, who were departing the OHA for leagues elsewhere in Canada.

== Executive personnel ==
=== Presidents ===
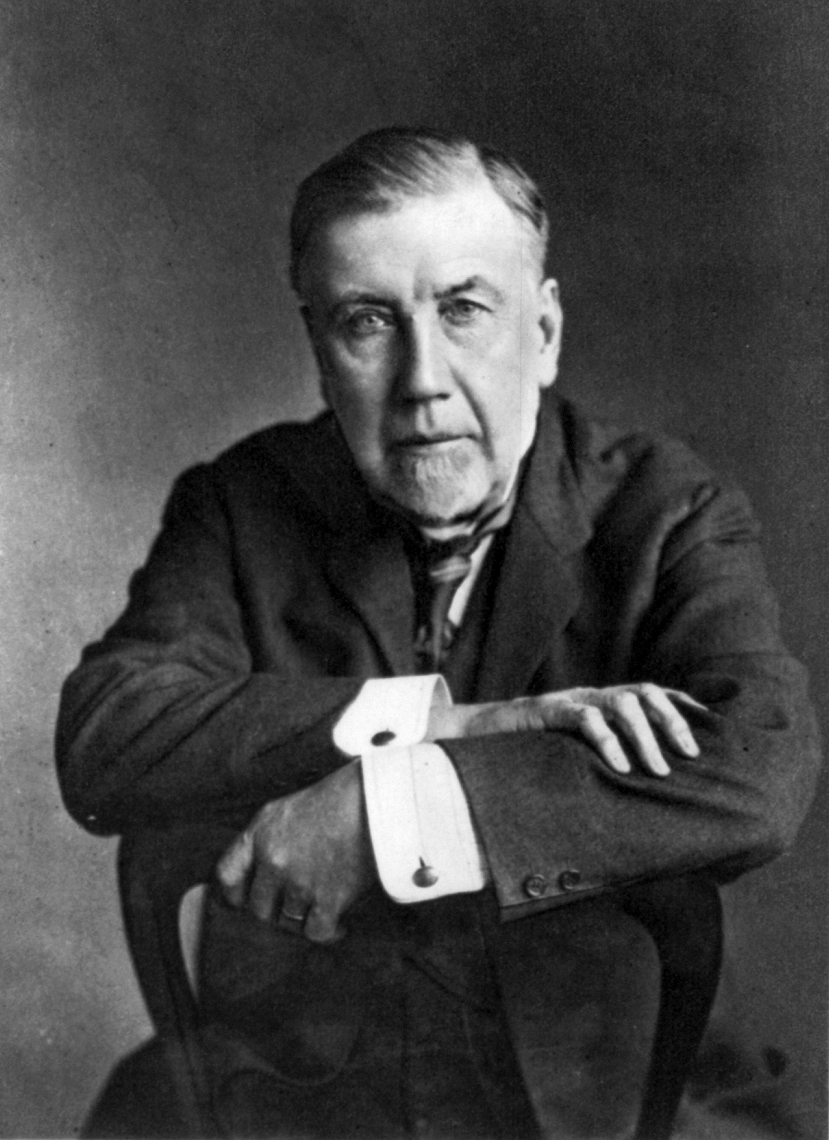
John Ross Robertson

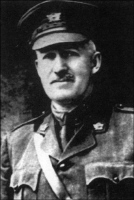
James T. Sutherland

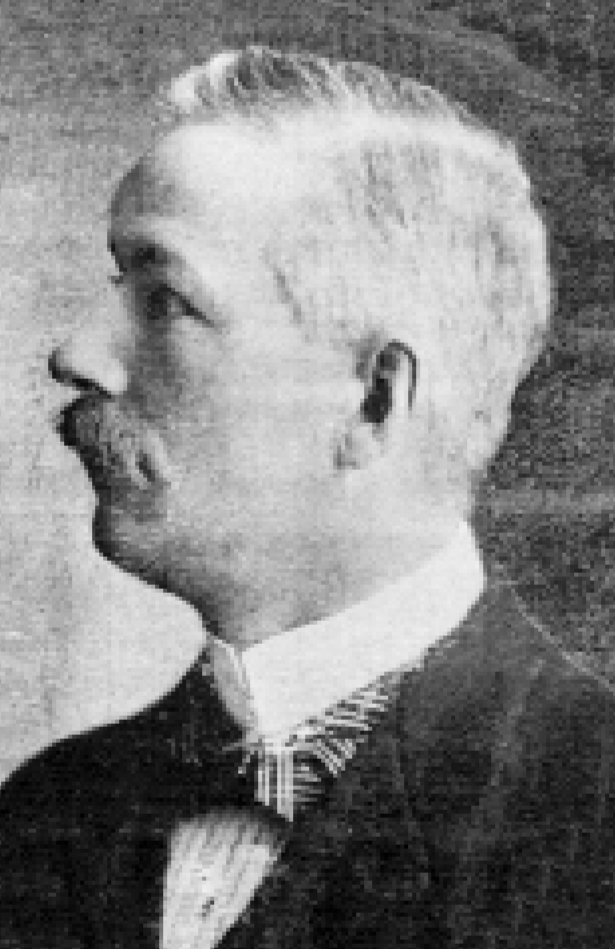
J. F. Paxton

The OHA was governed by elected presidents from 1890 to 1980. From 1980 onward, a board of directors was elected, with a full-time employee to execute duties as the president.

List of elected presidents of the OHA:

Year(s)	President	Residence
1890–1892	A. Morgan Cosby	Toronto
1892–1894	H. D. Warren	Toronto
1894–1896	C. A. B. Brown	Toronto
1896–1897	J. A. MacFadden	Toronto
1897–1898	Alexis Martin	Toronto
1898–1899	A. Creelman	Toronto
1899–1905	John Ross Robertson	Toronto
1905–1907	D. L. Darroch	Collingwood
1907–1909	D. J. Turner	Toronto
1909–1911	Louis Blake Duff	Welland
1911–1913	H. E. Wettlaufer	Berlin
1913–1915	Charles Farquharson	Stratford
1915–1917	James T. Sutherland	Kingston
1917–1918	J. F. Paxton	Whitby
1918–1920	R. M. Glover	Peterborough
1920–1922	A. E. Copeland	Midland
1922–1924	W. A. Fry	Dunnville
1924–1926	William Easson	Stratford
1926–1928	George B. McKay	Toronto
1928–1930	Richard Butler	Lindsay
1930–1932	Frank Hyde	Woodstock
1932–1934	J. Percy Bond	Peterborough
1934–1936	George Dudley	Midland
1936–1938	Alvin H. Schlegel	Preston
1938–1940	James Douglas	Brantford
1940–1942	Ross E. Clemens	Hamilton
1942–1945	Francis Moore	Welland
1945–1948	George Panter	Gravenhurst
1948–1950	J. J. McFadyen	Galt
1950–1952	Jack Roxburgh	Simcoe
1952–1953	S. E. McTavish	Oshawa
1953–1955	M. L. "Tory" Gregg	Wingham
1955–1957	Frank Buckland	Peterborough
1957–1959	Lorne Cook	Kingston
1959–1961	Ken McMillan	Georgetown
1961–1963	Lloyd Pollock	Windsor
1963–1965	C. G. Patterson	Guelph
1965–1967	Matt Leyden	Oshawa
1967–1969	Jack Devine	Belleville
1969–1972	Tubby Schmalz	Walkerton
1972–1974	Frank Doherty	Thorold
1974–1976	Cliffe Phillips	Newmarket
1976–1978	Hugh McLean	London
1978–1980	Larry Bellisle	Penetanguishene

=== Administrators ===
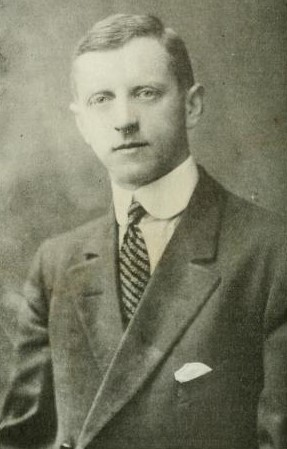
W. A. Hewitt

W. A. Hewitt was named secretary of the OHA on December 8, 1903, to succeed William Ashbury Buchanan. As the secretary, Hewitt was the de facto referee-in-chief of the OHA. He spoke annually at referee meetings to review interpretations of new and existing rules of play, and sought consistency and more strict enforcement of the rules when dealing with dissent and physical play.

In January 1948, the OHA hired George Panter as an assistant secretary, then later made Panter its business manager to oversee day-to-day operations. Hewitt retained his office at Maple Leaf Gardens where he kept the OHA's records, despite that a new office was opened across the road. Bill Hanley became the business manager in 1951, and Hewitt's role gradually decreased. The OHA established a permanent referee-in-chief position in 1952, and lessened the workload on Hewitt. Hewitt retired in May 1966, then the OHA transferred the secretary's duties to Hanley and renamed his position from business manager to secretary manager. Hanley served as secretary manager until he retired in 1973, when he was succeeded by David Branch who filled the role until 1977.

Brent Ladds was appointed secretary-manager of the OHA on July 6, 1977. He was appointed president of the OHA on April 28, 1980, after a restructuring from an elected president into an elected chairman and an appointed president. He was to focus on the increasing business demands on the OHA, fundraising and publicity, and be a technical co-ordinator. He became the first paid full-time president of the OHA. He retired as OHA president in June 2012. He stated that when he began working for the OHA, he dealt with "three or four bench-clearing brawls [each] weekend", but that culture had changed over time. He felt that the OHA had transitioned into being "a more nimble and responsive organization" than when he began; and was proud of his work to advance player safety and reduce on-ice injuries, which included increased penalties for rough play and certification programs for coaches and referees.

== Jurisdiction ==
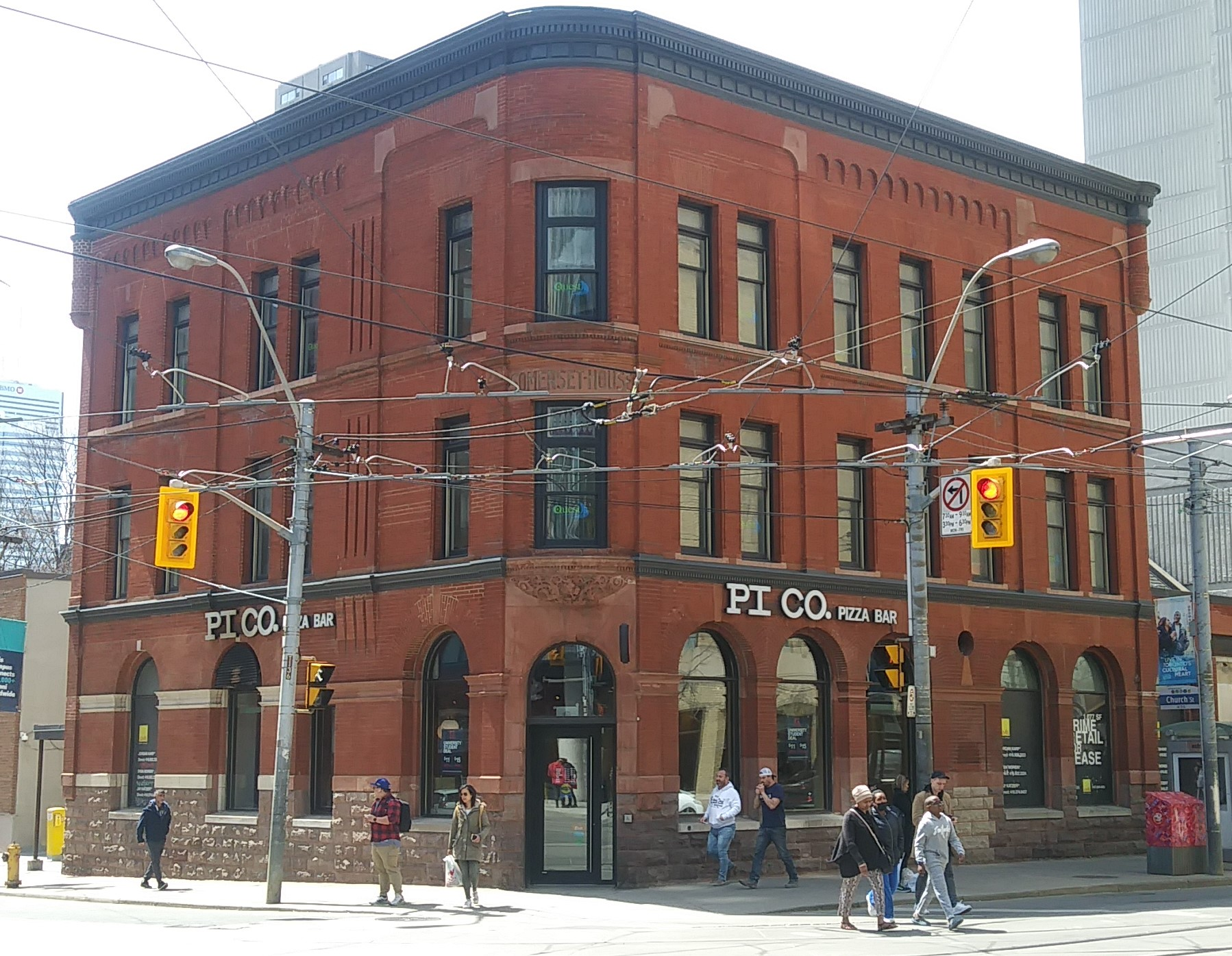
The OHA offices were once located in Somerset House, upstairs from a Canadian Bank of Commerce branch at 51 Carlton Street in Toronto.

Empowered by Hockey Canada, the OHA governs all Ontario senior and junior hockey not administered by Hockey Northwestern Ontario, Hockey Eastern Ontario, or Northern Ontario Hockey Association. This does not include the Greater Metro Junior A Hockey League or Western Ontario Athletic Association (at the Senior level), which are run outside of Hockey Canada's jurisdiction and are not affiliated.

Hockey Eastern Ontario represents the part of Ontario East of and including Lanark County, Renfrew County, and Leeds County, but not including the town of Gananoque. Hockey Northwestern Ontario has control of the section of Northwestern Ontario west of the 85th meridian.

== Leagues ==
=== Junior A ===
- Ontario Junior Hockey League

=== Junior B ===
- Greater Ontario Hockey League

=== Junior C ===
- Provincial Junior Hockey League

=== Senior ===
- Allan Cup Hockey – This league was formerly known as Major League Hockey
- Ontario Elite Hockey League - Formerly the WOAA Senior Hockey League. This league competes as Sr. "AA" and does not currently compete for the Allan Cup

Please note: the Ontario Hockey League is not a member of the Ontario Hockey Association, but does carry a working relationship with it.

== Former leagues ==
=== Junior ===
- Big 10 Junior B Hockey League
- Border Cities Junior B Hockey League
- Central Ontario Junior C Hockey League
- Eastern Junior B Hockey League
- Empire B Junior C Hockey League
- Georgian Mid-Ontario Junior C Hockey League
- Golden Horseshoe Junior Hockey League
- Great Lakes Junior C Hockey League
- Metro Junior A Hockey League
- Mid-Ontario Junior B Hockey League
- Mid-Western Junior Hockey League
- Midwestern Junior C Hockey League
- Niagara & District Junior C Hockey League
- Northern Junior D Hockey League
- Ontario Junior Hockey League
- Ontario Provincial Junior A Hockey League (1972-1987)
- Quinte-St. Lawrence Junior C Hockey League
- Southern Counties Junior D Hockey League
- Southern Ontario Junior A Hockey League
- Southern Ontario Junior Hockey League
- Southwestern Junior B Hockey League
- Suburban Junior C Hockey League
- Western Ontario Hockey League
- Western Ontario Junior C Hockey League

=== Senior ===
- Northern Premier Hockey League formerly Eastern Ontario Super Hockey League
- Major Intermediate A Hockey League
- OHA Senior A Hockey League
- OHA Senior A Hockey League (1929-1979)

== Championship trophies ==
The J. Ross Robertson Cup for senior hockey

Active trophies

- OHA/OHF Senior "AAA" – J. Ross Robertson Cup
- Senior "AA" – OEHL Cup (renamed J. F. Paxton Cup)
- Senior "A" – Hugh McLean Trophy (OEHL Tier II champions)
- OPJHL – Frank L. Buckland Trophy
- Junior "B" – Sutherland Cup
- Junior "C" – Clarence Schmalz Cup

Retired trophies

- Senior "B" – Ken McMillan Cup
- Senior "C" – W. A. Hewitt Cup
- Intermediate division – J. Ross Robertson Cup
- Major Junior – J. Ross Robertson Cup (transferred to the Ontario Hockey League)
- SOJAHL – Jack Oakes Memorial Trophy
- Super "C" – George S. Dudley Cup
- Senior – Cosby Cup
- Junior "D" - OHA Cup

== See also ==
- List of ice hockey teams in Ontario
- List of ice hockey leagues
- Canadian Junior A Hockey League
- Hockey Canada
- Hockey Eastern Ontario
- Ontario Hockey League history

== Sources ==
- Young, Scott (1989). 100 Years of Dropping the Puck. Toronto, Ontario: McClelland & Stewart. ISBN 0-7710-9093-5.
