= Dresden Jr. Kings =

Canadian junior ice hockey team

- City: Dresden, Ontario
- League: Provincial Junior Hockey League
- Conference: West
- Division: Stobbs
- Founded: 1960
- Home arena: Ken Houston Memorial Agricultural Center
- Colours: Maroon, and White
- General manager: Chris Dawson
- Head coach: Mike Oliveira (2023)

Championships
- League champions: 1971, 1984, 2004
- Clarence Schmalz Cups: 1971

The Dresden Jr. Kings are a junior ice hockey team based in Dresden, Ontario, Canada. They play in the Provincial Junior Hockey League of the Ontario Hockey Association and Hockey Canada. The Kings won the Clarence Schmalz Cup in 1971 at Ontario Provincial Junior C Champions.

== History ==
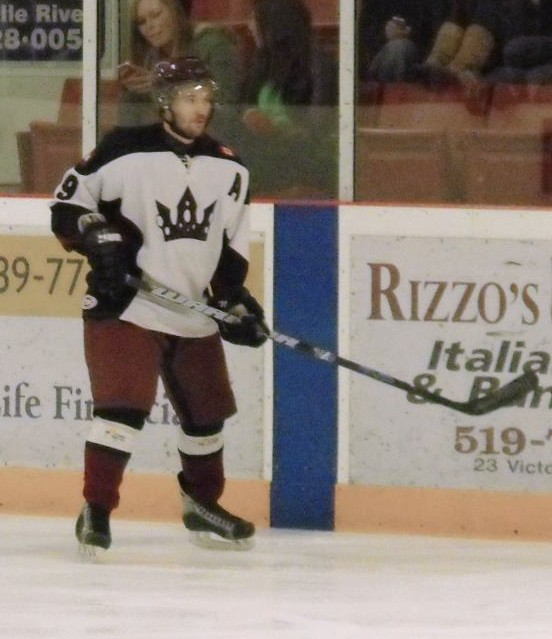
Dresden forward Dylan Mertz lining up for play in 2013 GLJHL Semi-finals in Essex, Ontario.

Founded in 1959, the Kings started out in the first Border Cities Junior "B" Hockey League. In the 1960s they spent some time in the Bluewater Junior "C" Hockey League after the first BCJHL folded. When the second BCJHL came around, they were back on board. In 1971, the league became the Great Lakes Junior Hockey League. They, with the Blenheim Blades have been with the league all along. The 1971 season saw the GLJHL play as both a Junior "B" and "C" league. The top 3 teams went on to the Ontario Hockey Association Junior "B" playoffs, while the 4th and 5th place teams played off for the league's first Junior "C" title and a birth into the Clarence Schmalz Cup playdowns. The Kings made quick work of the GLJHL playoffs and in the end, possibly aided by the regular season battles against the Petrolia Jets and the Windsor Royals, won the Clarence Schmalz Cup.

== Season-by-season record ==
| Season | GP | W | L | T | OTL | GF | GA | P | Results | Playoffs |
| 1960-61 | 30 | 10 | 19 | 1 | - | 123 | 163 | 21 | 6th BCJBHL | DNQ |
| 1961-62 | 30 | 14 | 16 | 0 | - | 144 | 155 | 28 | 4th BCJBHL | Won League 4-3 (Flyers); Lost CSC semi-final 0-3 (Sugar Kings) |
| 1962-63 | 36 | 14 | 21 | 1 | - | 156 | 187 | 29 | 5th BCJBHL | Won semi-final 2-0 (Flyers); Won League 3-2 (Hornets); Lost CSC quarter-final 1-4 (Hahns) |
| 1963-64 | 27 | 5 | 22 | 0 | - | 88 | 192 | 10 | 6th BCJBHL | Lost semi-final 0-4 (Flyers) |
| 1964-67 | Statistics Not Available | | | | | | | | | |
| 1967-68 | 23 | 14 | 6 | 3 | - | 134 | 97 | 31 | 1st BWJHL | Won League 4-1 (Jets); Lost CSC quarter-final 0-4 (Gemini) |
| 1968-69 | 30 | 17 | 12 | 1 | - | 153 | 159 | 35 | 5th BCJHL | Won League 3-2 (2 ties) (Flyers); Lost CSC quarter-final 0-4 (Navy Vets) |
| 1969-70 | 32 | 14 | 16 | 2 | - | 124 | 133 | 30 | 3rd BCJHL | Lost final 0-4 (Flyers) |
| 1970-71 | 39 | 20 | 17 | 2 | - | 185 | 151 | 42 | 4th GLJHL | Won League 3-2 (2 ties) (Flyers); Won CSC quarter-final 4-1 (Marlands); Won CSC semi-final 4-1 (Barons); Won CSC Final 4-3 (Red Eagles) |
| 1971-72 | 36 | 15 | 14 | 7 | - | 172 | 154 | 37 | 4th GLJHL | Won semi-final 3-1 (Flags); Lost final 1-4 (Flyers) |
| 1972-73 | 42 | 19 | 21 | 2 | - | 173 | 204 | 40 | 5th GLJHL | Lost quarter-final 0-3 (Lakers) |
| 1973-74 | 43 | 11 | 28 | 4 | - | 173 | 303 | 26 | 9th GLJHL | DNQ |
| 1974-75 | 42 | 16 | 21 | 5 | - | 188 | 192 | 37 | 5th GLJHL | Lost quarter-final 1-3 (Flyers) |
| 1975-76 | 41 | 27 | 14 | 0 | - | 242 | 167 | 55 | 2nd GLJHL | Won semi-final 4-1 (Flyers); Lost final 3-4 (73's) |
| 1976-77 | 42 | 21 | 18 | 3 | - | 211 | 197 | 45 | 4th GLJHL | Won semi-final 4-2 (Flyers); Lost final 3-4 (73's) |
| 1977-78 | 42 | 32 | 8 | 2 | - | 300 | 159 | 66 | 2nd GLJHL | Won semi-final 3-1 (Flyers); Lost final 1-4 (73's) |
| 1978-79 | 40 | 19 | 19 | 2 | - | 277 | 281 | 40 | 5th GLJHL | Won quarter-final 2-1 (Lakers); Lost semi-final 1-3 (Blades) |
| 1979-80 | 41 | 14 | 25 | 2 | - | 219 | 278 | 30 | 6th GLJHL | DNQ |
| 1980-81 | 41 | 21 | 16 | 4 | - | 221 | 195 | 46 | 4th GLJHL | Won quarter-final 3-0 (Flags); Lost semi-final 0-3 (Flyers) |
| 1981-82 | 35 | 18 | 13 | 4 | - | 212 | 192 | 40 | 5th GLJHL | Won quarter-final 3-2 (Lakers); Lost semi-final 1-4 (Flyers) |
| 1982-83 | 35 | 15 | 18 | 2 | - | 194 | 181 | 32 | 6th GLJHL | Won quarter-final 3-2 (Flags); Lost semi-final 1-4 (Lakers) |
| 1983-84 | 40 | 28 | 6 | 6 | - | 307 | 157 | 62 | 1st GLJHL | Won semi-final 4-2 (Flags); Won League 4-3 (Canadiens); Lost CSC semi-final 3-4 (Navy Vets) |
| 1984-85 | 40 | 21 | 12 | 7 | - | 256 | 163 | 49 | 3rd GLJHL | Won quarter-final 3-2 (Blades); Lost semi-final 0-4 (73's) |
| 1985-86 | 40 | 23 | 13 | 4 | - | 200 | 197 | 50 | 3rd GLJHL | Won quarter-final 3-2 (Lakers); Lost semi-final 0-4 (Flags) |
| 1986-87 | 40 | 18 | 17 | 2 | 3 | 190 | 172 | 41 | 6th GLJHL | Won quarter-final 4-0 (Blades); Won semi-final 4-0 (Flags); Lost final 2-4 (73's) |
| 1987-88 | 38 | 14 | 17 | 5 | 2 | 153 | 168 | 35 | 7th GLJHL | Lost quarter-final 0-4 (Flags) |
| 1988-89 | 40 | 23 | 16 | 0 | 1 | 209 | 165 | 47 | 6th GLJHL | Won Div semi-final 5-4 (Flags) 9 game super-series Lost Div final 3-4 (Steeplejacks) |
| 1989-90 | 40 | 14 | 17 | 6 | 3 | 193 | 194 | 37 | 8th GLJHL | Lost quarter-final 0-4 (Hawks) |
| 1990-91 | 42 | 16 | 20 | 4 | 2 | 204 | 204 | 38 | 7th GLJHL | Lost quarter-final 1-4 (Hawks) |
| 1991-92 | 42 | 15 | 24 | 1 | 2 | 174 | 203 | 33 | 9th GLJHL | DNQ |
| 1992-93 | 40 | 15 | 21 | 0 | 4 | 162 | 184 | 34 | 8th GLJHL | Lost quarter-final 0-4 (Flags) |
| 1993-94 | 40 | 25 | 10 | 3 | 2 | 203 | 147 | 55 | 2nd GLJHL | Lost quarter-final 2-4 (Steeplejacks) |
| 1994-95 | 41 | 16 | 20 | 4 | 1 | 144 | 174 | 37 | 7th GLJHL | Lost quarter-final 0-4 (Steeplejacks) |
| 1995-96 | 41 | 17 | 18 | 5 | 1 | 173 | 168 | 40 | 7th GLJHL | Lost quarter-final 2-4 (Flags) |
| 1996-97 | 41 | 5 | 31 | 4 | 1 | 121 | 221 | 15 | 11th GLJHL | DNQ |
| 1997-98 | 45 | 18 | 24 | 3 | 0 | 164 | 198 | 39 | 7th GLJHL | Lost quarter-final 1-4 (Sharks) |
| 1998-99 | 40 | 9 | 28 | 2 | 1 | 128 | 216 | 21 | 9th GLJHL | DNQ |
| 1999-00 | 42 | 8 | 30 | 2 | 2 | 131 | 128 | 20 | 8th GLJHL | Lost quarter-final 0-4 (Canadiens) |
| 2000-01 | 39 | 17 | 21 | 0 | 1 | 142 | 157 | 35 | 6th GLJHL | Lost quarter-final 1-4 (Lakers) |
| 2001-02 | 40 | 15 | 19 | 3 | 3 | 150 | 173 | 36 | 8th GLJHL | Lost quarter-final 0-4 (73's) |
| 2002-03 | 40 | 14 | 24 | 2 | 0 | 140 | 161 | 30 | 7th GLJHL | Lost quarter-final 3-4 (Sharks) |
| 2003-04 | 40 | 23 | 15 | 2 | 0 | 146 | 138 | 48 | 4th GLJHL | Won quarter-final 4-0 (Comets); Won semi-final 4-1 (Canadiens); Won League 4-2 (73's); Lost CSC Semi-final 1-4 (Ironmen) |
| 2004-05 | 40 | 26 | 12 | 1 | 1 | 166 | 117 | 54 | 2nd GLJHL | Won quarter-final 4-0 (Canadiens); Won semi-final 4-2 (Flyers); Lost final 1-4 (73's) |
| 2005-06 | 40 | 25 | 11 | 2 | 2 | 206 | 124 | 54 | 3rd GLJHL | Won quarter-final 4-0 (Comets); Lost semi-final 0-4 (73's) |
| 2006-07 | 40 | 19 | 17 | 2 | 2 | 168 | 142 | 42 | 4th GLJHL | Lost quarter-final 2-4 (Flags) |
| 2007-08 | 40 | 8 | 28 | 2 | 2 | 100 | 195 | 20 | 9th GLJHL | DNQ |
| 2008-09 | 40 | 20 | 14 | - | 6 | 130 | 140 | 46 | 4th GLJHL | Won quarter-final 4-2 (Blades); Wom semi-finals 4-3 (Flags); Lost final 0-4 (73's) |
| 2009-10 | 40 | 16 | 20 | - | 4 | 167 | 197 | 36 | 6th GLJHL | Won quarter-final 4-3 (Flags); Lost semi-final 1-4 (Lakers) |
| 2010-11 | 40 | 9 | 26 | - | 5 | 119 | 177 | 23 | 9th GLJHL | DNQ |
| 2011-12 | 40 | 15 | 20 | - | 5 | 136 | 174 | 35 | 7th GLJHL | Won quarter-final 4-1 (Blades); Lost semi-final 2-4 (73's) |
| 2012-13 | 40 | 21 | 17 | - | 2 | 136 | 140 | 44 | 4th GLJHL | Won Quarters 4-2 (Blades); Lost semi-final 0-4 (73's) |
| 2013-14 | 40 | 14 | 20 | - | 6 | 129 | 166 | 34 | 8th GLJHL | Lost quarter-final 0-4 (73's) |
| 2014-15 | 40 | 19 | 18 | - | 3 | 141 | 161 | 41 | 6th GLJHL | Won quarter-final 4-3 (Canadiens); Lost semi-final 0-4 (Essex 73's) |
| 2015-16 | 40 | 16 | 19 | 3 | 2 | 158 | 162 | 37 | 7th GLJHL | Lost quarter-final, 2-4 (Blades) |
| 2016-17 | 40 | 19 | 20 | 1 | - | 169 | 160 | 39 | 5th of 9 Stobbs; PJHL | Lost div quarter-final, 2-4 (Blades) |
| 2017-18 | 40 | 27 | 9 | 1 | 3 | 159 | 116 | 58 | 2nd of 9 Stobbs; PJHL | Won Div Quarter-final, 4-0 (Sharks); Lost div semi-final, 2-4 (73's) |
| 2018-19 | 40 | 29 | 9 | 0 | 2 | 150 | 101 | 60 | 3rd of 9 Stobbs; PJHL | Won Div Quarter-final 4-1 (Blades); Lost div semi-final 2-4 (Canadiens) |
| 2019-20 | 40 | 13 | 25 | 0 | 2 | 109 | 92 | 28 | 7th of 9 Stobbs; PJHL | Lost div quarter-final 0-4 (Flags) |
| 2020-21 | Season Lost due to COVID-19 pandemic | | | | | | | | | |
| 2021-22 | 32 | 4 | 24 | 3 | 1 | 62 | 167 | 12 | 9th of 9 Stobbs; PJHL | Did not qualify |
| 2022-23 | 42 | 9 | 31 | 2 | 0 | 105 | 221 | 20 | 7th of 8 Stobbs; PJHL | Lost div quarter-final 0-4 (Canadiens) |
| 2023-24 | 42 | 6 | 34 | 2 | 0 | 55 | 232 | 14 | 7th of 8 Stobbs; PJHL | Lost div quarter-final 0-4 (73's) |
| 2024-25 | 42 | 11 | 29 | 1 | 1 | 102 | 179 | 24 | 7th of 8 Stobbs; 14th of 16 West Conf; 52nd of 63 PJHL | Lost Div Quarter-final 0-4 (Canadiens) |
| 2025-26 | 42 | 15 | 24 | 4 | 1 | 171 | 192 | 35 | 7th of 8 Stobbs; 14th of 16 West Conf; 43rd of 61 PJHL | Lost Div Quarter-final 0-4 (Canadiens) |

== 2024–25 team staff ==
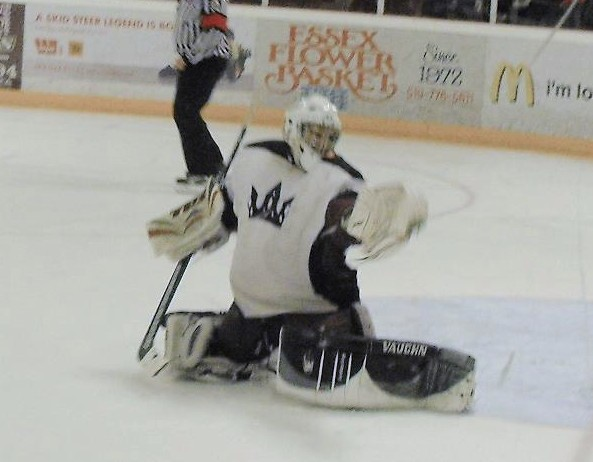
Kings goaltender Brent Paxton stretches for a glove save during the 2013 GLJHL Semi-finals.

- General Manager - Chris Dawson
- Assistant manager - Kent Hamilton
- Head coach - Shawn Connors
- Assistant coach - Dan Portelance
- Assistant coach -Tom VanEerd
- Goalie coach - Ty Golden
- Trainer - Scott Syrie
- Equipment Manager- Eric Harvey

== Clarence Schmalz Cup appearances ==
1971: Dresden Jr. Kings defeated Bowmanville Eagles 4-games-to-3

== Notable alumni ==
- Brett Brochu
- Dave Kelly
- Brian Wiseman
