= Amherstburg Admirals =

Canadian junior ice hockey team

- City: Amherstburg, Ontario, Canada
- League: Provincial Junior Hockey League
- Conference: West
- Division: Stobbs
- Founded: 1987
- Home arena: Libro Centre
- Colours: Blue, yellow, and white
- General manager: Andrew Sykes
- Head coach: Paul Bortignon (2014-22, 2026-present)

Franchise history
- 1987–2013: Kingsville Comets
- 2013–present: Amherstburg Admirals

The Amherstburg Admirals are a Canadian junior ice hockey club based in Amherstburg, Ontario, Canada. They are members of the Provincial Junior Hockey League of the Ontario Hockey Association.

From 1987 until 2013, the team was located in Kingsville, Ontario, as the Kingsville Comets.

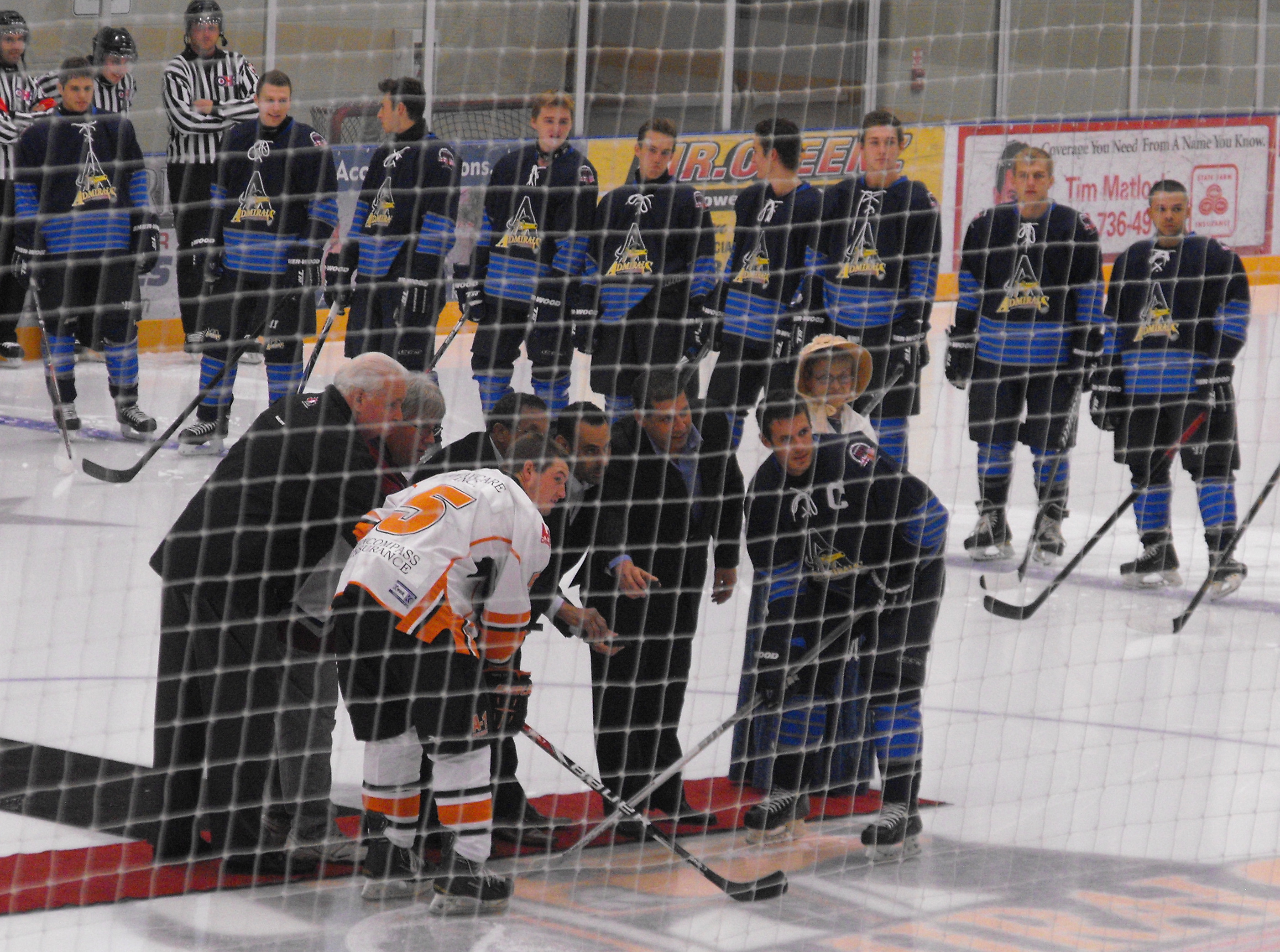
Opening ceremonies to 2013-14 season

== History ==
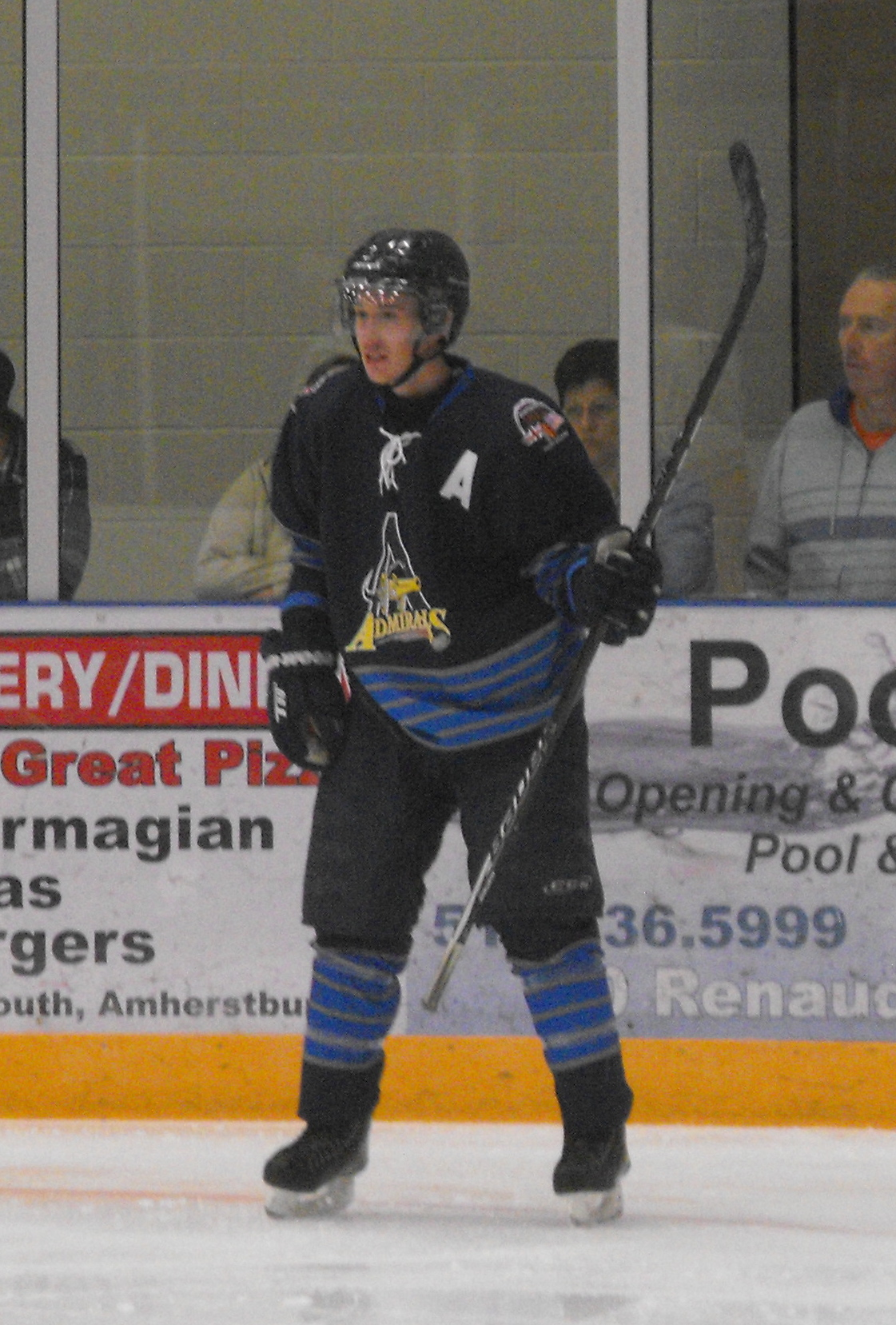
Admirals' player lining up for draw (2013)

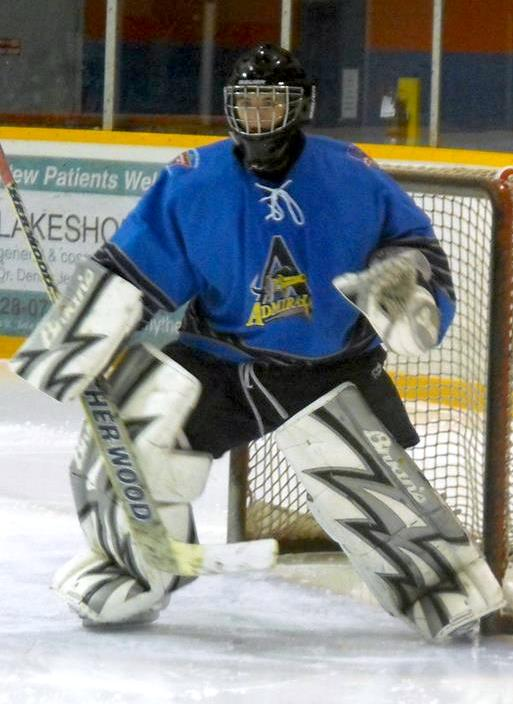
Admirals' goalie during 2013-14 season, wearing "baby blues".

In the late 1980s the perennial powerhouse Leamington Flyers seemed poised to make a jump to the Western Ontario Junior B Hockey League. The GLJHL granted expansion to the Comets right on Leamington's doorstep. In 1992, the Flyers finally made the jump and a lot of the local skill attributed to the Flyers switched over to the Comets. Throughout the 1990s and early 2000s the Comets would be competitive. As the 2000s wore on, despite a newly renovated arena from the municipality, performance on the ice and attendance greatly declined.

The 2011-2012 season was the Kingsville Comets 25th year of play in the Great Lakes Jr. C league.

In April 2013, the team had struck a tentative deal with the Ontario Hockey Association and the town of Amherstburg, Ontario, to relocate the struggling franchise. Amherstburg had recently constructed a new arena which only required minor upgrades to host a Junior C team. In 26 years in Kingsville the team failed to win a league championship or appear in the GLJHL final. Due to Kingsville's location, the Comets usually ran into either the Essex 73's or the Belle River Canadiens by either the division semi-final or final. In the Comets' 26 seasons, Essex and Belle River combined for 22 league titles.

On September 15, 2013, the Admirals made their hometown debut against the defending league champion Essex 73's. The Admirals would fall 6-0 in front of a sold-out crowd. Chris Wallace played the entire game for the Admirals, making 29 saves. The next night, the Admirals traveled to Wheatley, Ontario, for their first road game and came home with their first win. Josh Lafromboise scored the Admirals' first ever goal at 10:38 into the first period and Dan Matoski scored the game winner 1:54 in the third to take a 6-4 victory over the Wheatley Sharks. Chris Wallace picked up the first ever victory in net.

== Season-by-season record ==
Season	GP	W	L	T	OTL	GF	GA	P	Results	Playoffs
Kingsville Comets
1987-88	40	4	35	1	0	115	277	9	10th GLJHL	DNQ
1988-89	38	7	30	1	0	168	296	15	12th GLJHL	DNQ
1989-90	40	19	20	1	0	155	173	39	6th GLJHL	Won quarter-final 4-3 (Leamington); Lost semi-final 0-4 (Belle River)
1990-91	42	11	28	1	2	144	239	25	9th GLJHL	DNQ
1991-92	40	18	21	1	0	213	225	37	7th GLJHL	Lost quarter-final 0-4 (Belle River)
1992-93	40	24	14	1	1	211	176	50	4th GLJHL	Lost quarter-final 2-4 (Belle River)
1993-94	42	15	21	4	2	177	186	36	7th GLJHL	Lost quarter-final 0-4 (Belle River)
1994-95	42	20	15	5	2	180	136	47	4th GLJHL	Lost quarter-final 3-4 (Mooretown)
1995-96	40	17	17	5	1	173	161	40	6th GLJHL	Lost quarter-final 1-4 (Belle River)
1996-97	40	26	12	2	0	179	124	54	3rd GLJHL	Won quarter-final 4-0 (Essex); Lost semi-final 1-4 (Mooretown)
1997-98	44	19	18	6	1	142	156	45	6th GLJHL	Lost quarter-final 3-4 (Essex)
1998-99	40	28	10	0	2	199	138	58	4th GLJHL	Won quarter-final 4-2 (Southpoint); Lost semi-final 0-4 (Belle River)
1999-00	44	24	14	2	4	201	147	54	3rd GLJHL	Won quarter-final 4-0 (Blenheim); Lost semi-final 1-4 (Wallaceburg)
2000-01	40	24	10	3	3	158	101	54	2nd GLJHL	Won quarter-final 4-1 (Alvinston); Lost semi-final 2-4 (Wallaceburg)
2001-02	40	20	13	4	3	166	134	47	3rd GLJHL	Won quarter-final 4-0 (Alvinston); Lost semi-final 3-4 (Wheatley-Southpoint)
2002-03	40	21	12	5	2	159	136	49	4th GLJHL	Won quarter-final 4-3 (Belle River); Lost semi-final 2-4 (Essex)
2003-04	40	18	17	3	2	148	137	41	5th GLJHL	Lost quarter-final 0-4 (Dresden)
2004-05	40	22	16	1	1	141	133	46	4th GLJHL	Lost quarter-final 2-4 (Wheatley-Southpoint)
2005-06	40	22	16	1	1	182	156	46	5th GLJHL	Lost quarter-final 0-4 (Dresden)
2006-07	40	13	22	2	3	146	183	31	6th GLJHL	Lost quarter-final 0-4 (Wheatley-Southpoint)
2007-08	40	17	21	1	1	161	192	36	5th GLJHL	Lost quarter-final 2-4 (Belle River)
2008-09	40	9	29	-	2	129	209	20	9th GLJHL	Lost quarter-final 0-4 (Essex)
2009-10	40	12	26	-	2	148	223	26	7th GLJHL	Lost quarter-final 0-4 (Belle River)
2010-11	40	15	23	-	2	137	165	32	7th GLJHL	Lost quarter-final 0-4 (Belle River)
2011-12	40	9	28	-	3	108	182	21	8th GLJHL	Lost quarter-final 0-4 (Essex)
2012-13	40	11	26	-	3	119	169	25	8th GLJHL	Lost quarter-final 0-4 (Essex)
Amherstburg Admirals
2013-14	40	19	18	-	3	133	146	41	7th GLJHL	Lost quarters 3-4 (Belle River)
2014-15	40	25	12	-	3	183	149	53	2nd GLJHL	Won quarters 4-0 (Wheatley); Won semi's 4-2 (Bleheim); Lost League Finals 2-4 (Essex)
2015-16	40	24	12	3	1	170	116	52	3rd GLJHL	Won quarters 4-0 (Wheatley); Won semi's 4-2 (Blenheim); Lost League Finals, 3-4 (Essex)
2016-17	40	26	14	0	-	193	130	52	3rd Stobbs	Won Div Quarters 4-2(Wheatley); Lost div semi-finals 0-4 (Essex)
2017-18	40	25	11	2	2	163	108	54	4th Stobbs	Lost Div Quarters 3-4 (Mooretown)
2018-19	40	28	9	0	3	155	88	59	4th Stobbs	Won Div Quarter-final 4-0 (Mooretown); Lost div semi-final 0-4 (Essex)
2019-20	40	24	12	1	3	148	118	52	3rd of 9 Stobbs	Won Div Quarter-final 4-3 (Petrolia); Lost div semi-final 0-4 (Mooretown)
2020-21	Season cancelled due to COVID-19 pandemic									
2021-22	32	16	15	0	1	90	105	33	4th of 9 Stobbs	Lost div quarter-final 0-4 (Wheatley)
2022-23	42	13	26	3	0	117	186	29	6th of 8 Stobbs	Lost div quarter-final 0-4 (Wheatley)
2023-24	42	10	32	0	0	109	219	20	6th of 8 Stobbs	Lost div quarter-final 1-4 (Blenheim)
2024-25	42	20	19	1	2	115	154	43	5th of 8 Stobbs Div; 11th of 16 West Conf; 37th of 63 PJHL	Won div quarter-final - 4-3 (Wheatley); Lost div semi-final 0-4 (Lakeshore)
2025-26	42	15	21	6	0	131	151	36	5th of 8 Stobbs Div; 12th of 16 West Conf; 41st of 61 PJHL	Won div quarter-final - 4-2 (Mooretown); Lost div semi-final 1-4 (Essex)
