= Mike Natyshak =

Canadian ice hockey player

- Born: November 29, 1963 (age 61); Belle River, Ontario, Canada
- Height: 6 ft 1 in (185 cm)
- Weight: 190 lb (86 kg; 13 st 8 lb)
- Position: Right wing
- Shot: Right
- Played for: Quebec Nordiques
- NHL draft: 1986 NHL Supplemental Draft; Quebec Nordiques
- Playing career: 1987–1989

Michael B. Natyshak (born November 29, 1963) is a Canadian former professional ice hockey player who played four games in the National Hockey League with the Quebec Nordiques during the 1987–88 season.

== Career statistics ==
=== Regular season and playoffs ===
			Regular season					Playoffs
Season	Team	League	GP	G	A	Pts	PIM	GP	G	A	Pts	PIM
1979–80	Belle River Canadiens	GLJCHL	3	0	1	1	0	—	—	—	—	—
1980–81	Belle River Canadiens	GLJCHL	23	5	12	17	95	—	—	—	—	—
1981–82	Belle River Canadiens	GLJCHL	—	—	—	—	—	—	—	—	—	—
1982–83	Windsor Blues	OHA-B	22	16	18	34	—	—	—	—	—	—
1983–84	Bowling Green State University	CCHA	19	0	0	0	0	—	—	—	—	—
1984–85	Bowling Green State University	CCHA	38	4	9	13	79	—	—	—	—	—
1985–86	Bowling Green State University	CCHA	40	3	5	8	62	—	—	—	—	—
1986–87	Bowling Green State University	CCHA	45	5	10	15	101	—	—	—	—	—
1987–88	Quebec Nordiques	NHL	4	0	0	0	0	—	—	—	—	—
1987–88	Fredericton Express	AHL	46	5	9	14	84	6	0	3	3	13
1988–89	Fort Wayne Komets	IHL	48	5	9	14	95	3	0	0	0	0
AHL totals			46	5	9	14	84	6	0	3	3	13
IHL totals			48	5	9	14	95	3	0	0	0	0
NHL totals			4	0	0	0	0	—	—	—	—	—
