= Lakeshore Canadiens =

Canadian junior ice hockey team

- City: Belle River, Ontario
- League: Provincial Junior Hockey League
- Conference: Western
- Division: Bill Stobbs
- Founded: 1978
- Home arena: Atlas Tube Centre
- Colours: Red, Blue, and White
- General manager: Mark Seguin
- Head coach: Brent Walker

Franchise history
- 1978–2014: Belle River Canadiens; 2014–present: Lakeshore Canadiens

Championships
- League champions: 1985, 1989, 1990, 1991, 1992, 1994, 1995, 1996, 1997, 2000, 2001, 2010, 2011, 2018, 2019, 2022, 2023, 2024, 2026
- Clarence Schmalz Cups: 1985, 1992, 1994, 1995, 2022, 2024

The Lakeshore Canadiens are a Canadian junior ice hockey team based in Belle River, Ontario. They play in the Provincial Junior Hockey League of the Ontario Hockey Association and Hockey Canada. The Canadiens are 6 time Clarence Schmalz Cup Winners as Provincial Junior C Champions and the defending Western Conference Champions. The team was known as the Belle River Canadiens from 1978 until 2014.

== History ==
Belle River Canadiens logo until 2014.

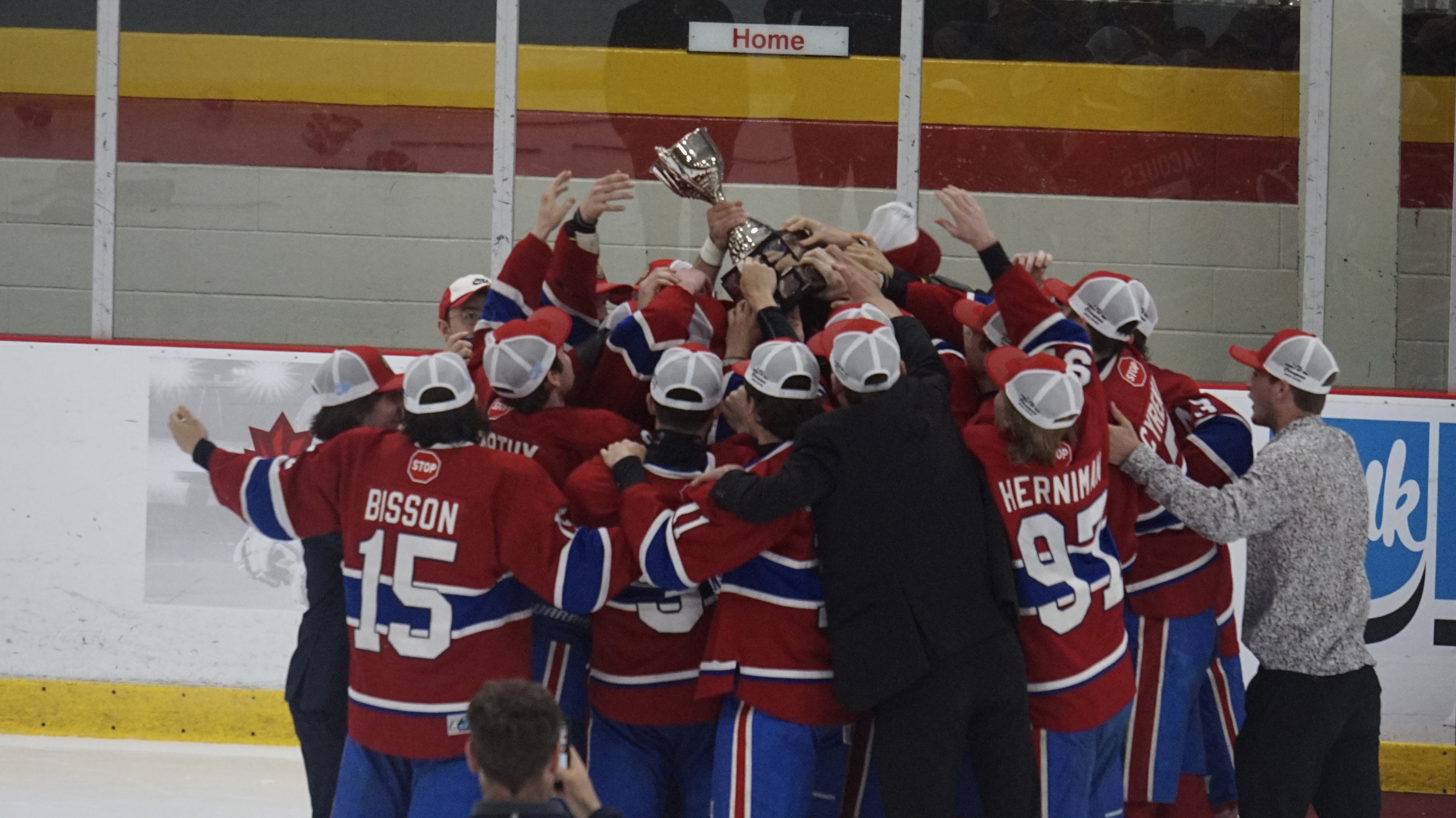
The Lakeshore Canadiens winning the 2022 Schmalz Cup.

From 1985 until 2001, the Canadiens were one of the most feared teams in all of Ontario Junior "C" hockey. Within those 17 years, the Canadiens won 11 GLJHL Championships and 4 Clarence Schmalz Cups as All-Ontario Junior "C" Champions in 8 trips to the All-Ontario Finals. After 9 years The Canadiens once again won the Great Lakes Junior "C" Title in 2010 defeating the Wallaceburg Lakers in 4 Games. In the Schmalz Cup Semi-finals they defeated the Grimsby Peach Kings 4 Games to 1 to advance to their first Ontario Final in 9 Years. The Canadiens then Lost the Schmalz Cup in 6 Games to the Alliston Hornets. In 2011 The Canadiens won their 2nd Consecutive Great Lakes title. They once again faced the Grimsby Peach Kings in the Ontario Semi-finals. Grimsby would win the series 4 games to 1.

The Canadiens franchise has won 19 Junior C League Championships, they have also won 6 Ontario Championships.

On June 6, 2014, the team announced it was changing its name to the Lakeshore Canadiens.

The Canadiens moved into the brand new Atlas Tube Centre in the fall of 2014. In their first game at the new Atlas Tube Centre Sebastian Kanally scored the first ever goal 38 seconds into the game as the Canadiens defeated their rivals from Essex by a score of 3–1. The Canadiens would finish 24–13–0–3 in their first full season in their new rink.

The summer of 2016 saw the GLJHL become the Bill Stobbs Division of the new Provincial Junior Hockey League, which resulted from the amalgamation of the eight junior "C" hockey leagues in Southern Ontario.

In 2017-2018 long time General Manager Mark Seguin hired Anthony Iaquinta as Head Coach, under Iaquinta the Canadiens finished First Place in the Stobbs division finishing with a record of 27-8-2-3, the Canadiens would sweep the Blenheim Blades and Mooretown Flags in the first 2 rounds, they would face their rivals from Essex in the division finals. In front of 3 straight sell out crowds on home ice the Canadiens would knock off the 73's in 5 games to claim their 14th League Championship.

2018-2019 would be another successful season for the Canadiens, finishing with a regular season record of 28-7-2-3 good enough for 2nd place in the Stobbs Division. In the playoffs the Habs would eliminate the Wheatley Sharks in 4 games, in the semi-finals they would face a very good Dresden Kings team. The Canadiens would defeat the Kings in 6 games in a hard-fought series setting up a rematch with the Essex 73's for a third straight season. The result would be the same as the previous season, the Canadiens once again defeating the 73's in 5 games in front of huge crowds at the Atlas Tube Centre to claim their 2nd straight Stobbs title and 15th League Championship in total. The Exeter Hawks would defeat the Canadiens in 7 games in the All Ontario playoffs.

The 2019–2020 season would be one of the most successful seasons in Canadiens history as the Canadiens finished with a record of 36 wins and 4 losses. The Canadiens were headed to the Stobbs Finals after knocking the Essex 73's in the semi-finals and set to face the Mooretown Flags however COVID would shut down the remainder of the season and cancel the 2020–2021 season.

The Canadiens returned to the ice in 2021-2022 after a year off due to the COVID. Once again the Canadiens would finish in first place with a 28-2-2 record in the regular season. The Canadiens swept the Wallaceburg Thunderhawks in round one. In the semi-finals the Canadiens were pushed to six hard fought games against the Wheatley Sharks to set up a finals matchup with the Essex 73's. For the fourth consecutive season the Canadiens got the best of the 73's and defeated them in six games. Trevor LaRue would score the league championship winning goal in Game 6 overtime as the Canadiens won their 16th league title. The Canadiens would move on to defeat the North Middlesex Stars in the Western Conference Finals in four close games. Next up was the Schmalz Cup tournament where the Canadiens would go 2 wins and 1 loss in the round robin to set up a semi finals matchup with the Grimsby Peach Kings. The Canadiens came away with a 5–0 victory to set up a showdown with the Clarington Eagles in the finals. In an instant classic, Dylan Weston would score 41 seconds into overtime to give the Canadiens a 3–2 victory to become Schmalz Cup Champions for the 5th time in team history and the first time since 1995.

In 2022-23, the Canadiens finished in second place in the Stobbs Division in the regular season with a 32-7-1-1 record and swept the Dresden Kings in the first round of the playoffs. This set up a rematch of the semi-finals from a year ago with the Wheatley Sharks. In a series in which the Canadiens fell behind 2 games to 0, they fought back and won the series in 6 games with Marco Sladoje scoring the series clinching goal, shorthanded, at the 5:32 mark of the 5th overtime in what was the longest game in PJHL history. Nicholas Bolton set a record with 96 saves in the game. The Canadiens now faced their rival, the Essex 73’s in the Stobbs Division final. The Canadiens defeated Essex in 5 games, with Braydin Metcalfe scoring the series winning goal at 9:31 of the 2nd overtime to give the Canadiens their 17th league Championship. In the Western Conference finals, the Canadiens defeated the Thamesford Trojans in 4 games and moved to the Schmalz Cup tournament for the 2nd consecutive year. The Canadiens finished the round robin with a 1-2 record and this set up a semi-final match up with the Wellesley Apple Jacks. It was not to be this time, as Wellesley scored 3:59 into the first overtime to eliminate the Canadiens.

In 2023-24 the Canadiens started slow, but finished very strong taking first place in the division by one point with a 37-5 record. They swept the Walpole Island Wild and the Wheatley Sharks to move into the league final against the Essex 73’s. In an epic battle between the two powerhouses, the Canadiens survived with a 3-1 win in game 7, in front of a full house at the Atlas Tube Center, to win their 18th league title. All 7 games were decided by 1 goal (two games had empty net goals) showing how small the difference was between the two teams. The Canadiens moved to the Western Conference final against the Thamesford Trojans and won the series in 4 games. This set up the Schmalz Cup semi final series against the South Conference Champions, the New Hamburg Firebirds. The Firebirds gave the Canadiens everything they could handle, but the Canadiens eventually won the series with a 5-2 win at home in game 6 to take the series. The Schmalz Cup final featured the East Conference Champions – Clarington Eagles against the Canadiens. In a very tight series, the Canadiens won game 5 on the road to win their 6th Schmalz Cup Championship. The team finished the Championship season with a 61-11 record.

== 2026–27 team staff ==
- General Manager - Mark Seguin
- Head Coach - Brent Walker
- Assistant Coach- Zack Gervais
- Assistant Coach - Spencer Higginbottom
- Video/Stats- Conor Jamieson
- Team Doctor- Dr. Kim Silvaggio
- Trainer- Liam Devine
- Equipment Manager- Chris Muzzin

== Season-by-season record ==
Season	GP	W	L	T	OTL	GF	GA	P	Results	Playoffs
1978-79	40	12	23	5	-	160	229	27	7th of 8 GLJHL	Did not qualify
1979-80	41	8	32	1	-	197	351	17	7th of 7 GLJHL	Did not qualify
1980-81	42	8	32	2	-	184	317	18	7th of 8 GLJHL	Did not qualify
1981-82	39	19	16	4	-	253	211	42	4th of 8 GLJHL	Lost quarter-final, 0-3 (73's)
1982-83	39	23	9	7	-	293	177	53	3rd of 8 GLJHL	Won quarter-final, 3-2 (73's); Lost semi-final, 2-4 (Flyers)
1983-84	39	27	9	3	-	227	139	57	2nd of 8 GLJHL	Won semi-final, 4-1 (Flyers); Lost final, 3-4 (Kings)
1984-85	40	27	9	4	-	224	142	58	1st of 9 GLJHL	Won quarter-final, 3-0 (Flyers); Won semi-final, 4-0 (Flags); Won League, 4-1 (73's); Won CSC QF, 4-0 (Barons); Won CSC SF, 4-3 (Warriors); Won CSC Final, 4-1 (Centennials)
1985-86	40	25	14	1	-	263	190	51	2nd of 9 GLJHL	Lost quarter-final, 2-3 (Flyers)
1986-87	38	23	11	2	2	196	129	50	3rd of 9 GLJHL	Lost quarter-final, 2-4 (Flyers)
1987-88	39	19	14	4	2	209	201	44	5th of 10 GLJHL	Lost quarter-final, 1-4 (73's)
1988-89	38	30	6	2	0	272	123	62	1st of 5 South Div. 1st of 12 GLJHL	Won Div. SF, 4-0 (Vikings); Won Div. Final, 4-2 (Flyers); Won League, 4-0 (Steeplejacks); Won CSC QF, 4-0 (Blues); Lost CSC SF, 3-4 (Barons)
1989-90	40	37	1	2	0	301	79	76	1st of 5 South Div. 1st of 11 GLJHL	Won Div. SF, 4-0 (Vikings); Won Div. Final, 4-0 (Comets); Won League, 4-0 (Hawks); Won CSC QF, 4-0 (83's); Won CSC SF, 4-0 (Brewers); Lost CSC Finals, 3-4 (Crushers)
1990-91	40	29	7	3	1	244	101	62	1st of 5 South Div. 1st of 10 GLJHL	Won Div. SF, 4-0 (Flyers); Won Div. Final, 4-1 (Vikings); Won League, 4-0 (Hawks); Won CSC QF, 4-2 (83's); Lost CSC SF, 2-4 (Barons)
1991-92	40	35	4	1	0	306	102	71	1st of 5 South Div. 1st of 11 GLJHL	Won Div. SF, 4-0 (Comets); Won Div. Final, 4-0 (73's); Won League, 4-0 (Hawks); Won CSC QF, 4-1 (Barons); Won CSC SF, 4-2 (Blues); Won CSC Final, 4-2 (Siskins)
1992-93	40	27	8	1	4	234	139	59	2nd of 5 South Div. 2nd of 11 GLJHL	Won Div. SF, 4-2 (Comets); Lost Div. Final, 0-4 (Hawks)
1993-94	40	35	2	3	0	293	109	73	1st of 5 South Div. 1st of 11 GLJHL	Won Div. SF, 4-0 (Comets); Won Div. Final, 4-2 (Hawks); Won League, 4-0 (Steeplejacks); Won CSC QF, 4-2 (Navy-Vets); Won CSC SF, 4-0 (Patriots); Won CSC Final, 4-0 (Real McCoys)
1994-95	40	38	0	1	1	249	87	78	1st of 4 Essex Div. 1st of 11 GLJHL	Won quarter-final, 4-0 (Admirals); Won semi-final, 4-0 (Flags); Won League, 4-0 (Blades); Won CSC SF, 4-0 (Navy-Vets); Won CSC Final, 4-0 (Eagles)
1995-96	42	38	2	2	0	198	77	78	1st of 5 South Div. 1st of 11 GLJHL	Won Div. SF, 4-0 (Comets); Won Div. Final, 4-0 (Sharks); Won League, 4-1 (Hawks); Lost CSC SF, 3-4 (Mounties)
1996-97	40	39	0	1	0	265	82	79	1st of 5 South Div. 1st of 11 GLJHL	Won quarter-final, 4-0 (Hawks); Won semi-final, 4-0 (Sharks); Won League, 4-2 (Flags); Won CSC SF, 4-0 (Bulldogs); Lost CSC Final, 2-4 (Rangers)
1997-98	45	34	8	3	0	194	104	71	1st of 5 South Div. 1st of 10 GLJHL	Won quarter-final, 4-0 (Hawks); Lost semi-final, 1-4 (Lakers)
1998-99	40	32	6	1	1	191	94	66	1st of 5 South Div. 1st of 10 GLJHL	Won quarter-final, 4-0 (Hawks); Won semi-final, 4-0 (Comets); Lost final, 3-4 (Lakers)
1999-00	39	33	3	3	0	214	92	69	1st of 4 South Div. 1st of 9 GLJHL	Won quarter-final, 4-0 (Kings); Won semi-final, 4-0 (73's); Won League, 4-3 (Lakers); Won CSC SF, 4-0 (Bulldogs); Lost CSC Final, 2-4 (Chiefs)
2000-01	40	32	3	2	3	175	93	69	1st of 4 South Div. 1st of 9 GLJHL	Won quarter-final, 4-0 (Sharks); Won semi-final, 4-2 (73's); Won League, 4-0 (Lakers); Won CSC SF, 4-0 (Barons); Lost CSC Final, 1-4 (Riverhawks)
2001-02	40	21	16	2	1	156	138	45	4th of 4 South Div. 5th of 9 GLJHL	Lost quarter-final, 3-4 (Flags)
2002-03	40	16	16	6	2	132	126	40	4th of 4 South Div. 5th of 9 GLJHL	Lost quarter-final, 3-4 (Comets)
2003-04	40	14	18	2	6	101	131	36	3rd of 4 South Div. 6th of 9 GLJHL	Won quarter-final, 4-2 (Flags); Lost semi-final, 1-4 (Kings)
2004-05	40	16	21	1	2	130	154	35	4th of 4 South Div. 7th of 9 GLJHL	Lost quarter-final, 0-4 (Kings)
2005-06	40	20	17	1	2	182	156	43	4th of 4 South Div. 6th of 9 GLJHL	Lost quarter-final, 0-4 (73's)
2006-07	40	27	10	2	1	221	149	57	2nd of 4 South Div. 2nd of 9 GLJHL	Won quarter-final, 4-1 (Flyers); Won semi-final, 4-3 (Sharks); Lost finals, 1-4 (73's)
2007-08	40	33	5	1	1	227	114	68	2nd of 4 South Div. 2nd of 9 GLJHL	Won Div. SF, 4-2 (Comets); Lost Div. Final, 1-4 (73's)
2008-09	40	26	9	-	5	213	133	57	2nd of 4 South Div. 2nd of 9 GLJHL	Won Div. SF, 4-3 (Sharks); Lost Div. Final, 1-4 (73's)
2009-10	40	31	7	-	2	241	126	64	1st of 4 South Div. 1st of 9 GLJHL	Won Div. SF, 4-0 (Comets); Won Div. Final, 4-2 (73's); Won League, 4-0 (Lakers); Won CSC SF, 4-1 (Peach Kings); Lost CSC Final, 2-4 (Hornets)
2010-11	40	29	10	-	1	192	102	59	1st of 4 South Div. 2nd of 9 GLJHL	Won Div. SF, 4-0 (Comets); Won Div. Final, 4-1 (Flags); Won League, 4-3 (Sharks); Lost CSC SF, 1-4 (Peach Kings)
2011-12	40	27	10	-	3	166	112	57	2nd of 4 South Div. 2nd of 9 GLJHL	Won quarter-final, 4-1 (Sharks); Won semi-final, 4-1 (Flags); Lost final, 1-4 (73's)
2012-13	40	26	11	-	3	146	109	55	2nd of 9 GLJHL	Won quarter-final, 4-1 (Flags); Lost semi-final, 3-4 (Sharks)
2013-14	40	23	15	-	2	165	141	48	2nd of 9 GLJHL	Won quarter-final, 4-3 (Admirals); Won semi-final, 4-2 (Blades); Lost finals 2-4 (73's)
2014-15	40	24	13	-	3	180	135	51	3rd of 9 GLJHL	Lost quarter-final, 3-4 (Kings)
2015-16	40	18	15	3	4	163	145	43	5th of 9 GLJHL	Lost quarter-final, 3-4 (Flags)
2016-17	40	31	8	1	-	229	115	63	1st of 9 Stobbs	Won quarter-final 4-0 (Flyers); Won semi-final 4-2 (Blades); Lost final, 0-4 (73's)
2017-18	40	27	8	2	3	143	94	59	1st of 9 Stobbs	Won quarter-final 4-0 (Blades); Won semi-final 4-0 (Flags); Won League 4-1 (73's); Lost West Conference Final, 3-4 (Lancers)
2018-19	40	28	7	2	3	166	81	61	2nd of 9 Stobbs	Won quarter-final 4-0 (Sharks); Won semi-final 4-2 (Kings); Won League 4-1 (73's); Lost West Conference Final 3-4 (Hawks)
2019-20	40	36	4	0	0	183	57	72	1st of 9 Stobbs	Won quarter-final 4-0 (Blades); Won semi-final 4-1 (73's) incomplete Div. Final 0-0 (Flags) playoffs cancelled due to COVID-19 pandemic.
2020-21	Season Lost due to COVID-19 pandemic									
2021-22	32	28	2	0	2	184	57	72	1st of 9 Stobbs	Won quarter-final 4-0 (Thunder Hawks); Won semi-final 4-2 (Sharks); Won League 4-2 (73's); Won West Conference final 4-0 (Stars) advance to CSC finals (see below); PJHL CHAMPIONS
2022-23	41	32	7	1	1	182	82	66	2nd of 8 Stobbs	Won quarter-final 4-0 (Kings); Won semi-final 4-2 (Sharks); Won League 4-1 (73's); Won West Conference final 4-0 (Trojans) advance to CSC finals (see below)
2023-24	42	37	5	0	0	241	70	74	1st of 8 Stobbs	Won quarter-final 4-0 (Wild); Won semi-final 4-0 (Sharks); Won League 4-3 (73's); Won West Conference Final 4-0 (Trojans); Won CSC semi-final 4-2 (Firebirds); Won CSC Final 4-1 (Eagles); PJHL CHAMPIONS
2024-25	42	35	7	0	0	220	96	70	2nd of 8 Stobbs	Won quarter-final 4-0 (Kings); Won semi-final 4-0 (Admirals); Lost Final 2-4 (73's)
2025-26	42	30	10	2	0	191	95	62	2nd of 8 Stobbs	Won quarter-final 4-0 (Kings); Won semi-final 4-3 (Blades); Won Final 4-3 (73's); Won West Conference Final 4-0 (Bulldogs); Lost CSC semi-final 2-4 (Braves)

== Clarence Schmalz Cup appearances ==
1985: Belle River Canadiens defeated Midland Centennials 4-games-to-1
1990: Orangeville Crushers defeated Belle River Canadiens 4-games-to-3
1992: Belle River Canadiens defeated Stayner Siskins 4-games-to-2
1994: Belle River Canadiens defeated Rockton Real McCoys 4-games-to-none
1995: Belle River Canadiens defeated Bowmanville Eagles 4-games-to-none
1997: Glanbrook Rangers defeated Belle River Canadiens 4-games-to-2
2000: Lakefield Chiefs defeated Belle River Canadiens 4-games-to-2
2001: Chippawa Riverhawks defeated Belle River Canadiens 4-games-to-1
2010: Alliston Hornets defeated Belle River Canadiens 4-games-to-2
2022: Lakeshore Canadiens defeated Clarington Eagles 3-2 OT in final
2024: Lakeshore Canadiens defeated Clarington Eagles 4-games-to-1

== Clarence Schmalz Cup Championships ==
Year	Round Robin	Record	Standing	Semifinal	Gold Medal Game
2022	W, Grimsby Peach Kings 3-2; W, Stayner Siskins 5-1; L, Clarington Eagles 1-4	2-1-0-0	1st of 4	W, Grimsby Peach Kings 5-0	W, Clarington Eagles 3-2; Clarence Schmalz Cup (PJHL) Champions
2023	W, Wellesley Applejacks 4-1; L, Stayner Siskins 2-4; L, Clarington Eagles 0-4	1-2-0-0	4th of 4	OTL, Wellesley Applejacks 2-3	n/a -

== Notable alumni ==
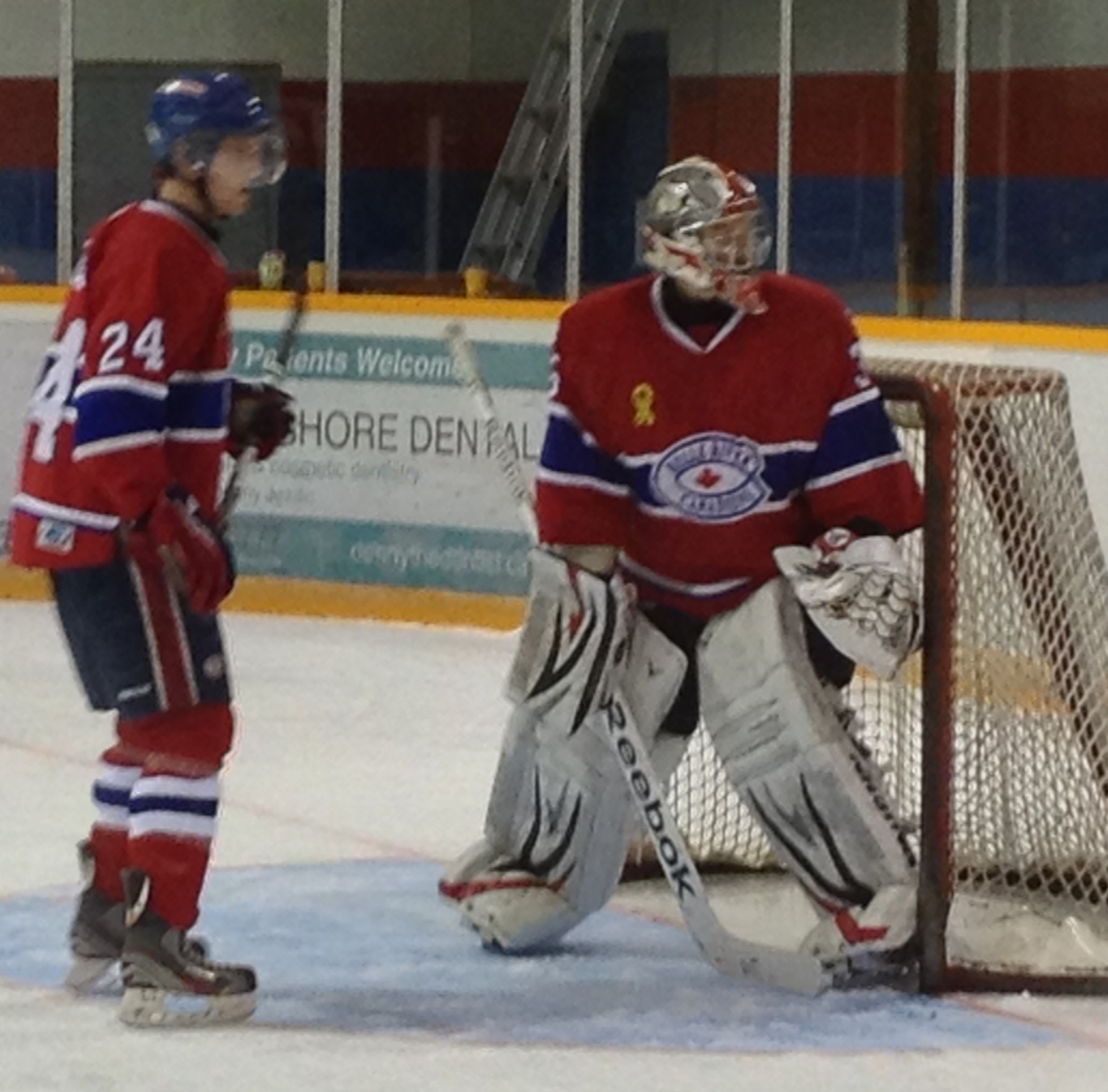
Belle River goalie watches puck behind his net during 2013–14 season

- Bob Boughner
- Tie Domi
- Mike Natyshak
- Marcel Pronovost
- D. J. Smith
- Alek Stojanov
- Derek Wilkinson
- Steve Ott
