= Mooretown Flags =

Canadian junior ice hockey team

- City: Mooretown, Ontario
- League: Provincial Junior Hockey League
- Division: Stobbs
- Founded: 1971
- Home arena: Mooretown Sports Complex
- Colours: Red and white
- General manager: TBA
- Head coach: TBA
- Website: mooretownflags.pjhlon.hockeytech.com

The Mooretown Flags are a Canadian Junior ice hockey team from Mooretown, Ontario. The Flags are members of the Provincial Junior Hockey League.

== History ==
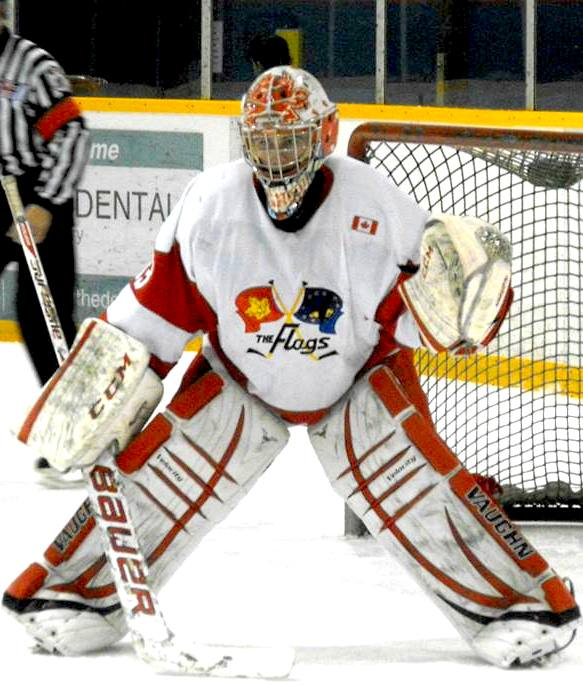
Flags goalie during 2013–14 season.

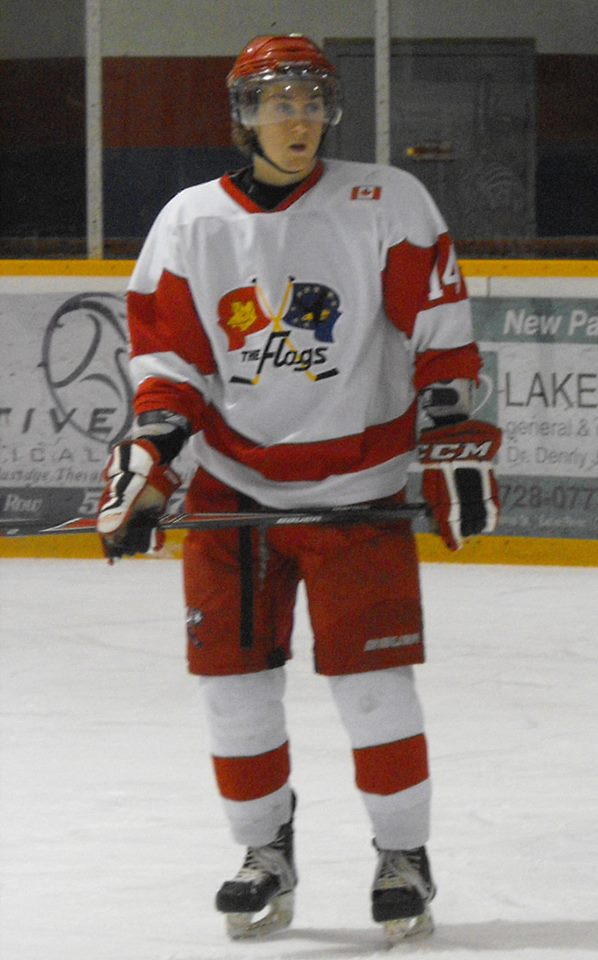
Flags player during 2013–14 season.

Founded in 1971, the Flags have won one Clarence Schmalz Cup as All-Ontario Junior "C" Champions.

Alumni of the Flags include National Hockey League player Brian Dobbin, as well as players who competed in the Ontario Hockey League (such as Cory Pageau) and at semi-professional levels (such as Dan Gardner, Joe Gardner, and Jeff Perry).

In 2006, the 1987-88 OHA Junior 'C' Championship team was inducted into the Sarnia Lambton Sports Hall of Fame.

Team Members were: Kerry Adams, Brad Allen, Mike Caley, Mark Cornelious, Ted Dupont, Tyler Fraleigh, Dan Gardner, John Germain, Shane Green, Shawn Jackson, Craig Lindsay, Seth Lippiatt, Brian McCabe, Lee McCabe, Shawn Muscutt, Ken Nicholson, Dave Oldale, Cory Pageau, Jeff Perry, Rob Purdy, Darren Thompson, Bob Waybrant, Ken Williams.

Coach - Mark Davis, Assistant Coach - Steve Degurse, Manager - Bob Haley, Trainer - Bryan Stack

Several players from the Mooretown Flags advanced to the affiliated Sarnia Legionnaires of the Greater Ontario Junior Hockey League during the 2009–10 season.

In the 2019–20 season, the Flags finished second in the PJHL Stobbs Division and won their first two playoff series before the postseason was cancelled due to the COVID-19 pandemic.

== Season-by-season record ==
| Season | GP | W | L | T | OTL | GF | GA | P | Results | Playoffs |
|---|---|---|---|---|---|---|---|---|---|---|
| 1971-72 | 36 | 11 | 19 | 6 | - | 146 | 162 | 28 | 6th GLJHL | Lost semi-final 1-3 (Dresden) |
| 1972-73 | 42 | 16 | 23 | 3 | - | 190 | 219 | 35 | 6th GLJHL | Lost semi-final 0-3 (Leamington) |
| 1973-74 | 42 | 28 | 11 | 3 | - | 252 | 174 | 59 | 3rd GLJHL | Lost semi-final 0-4 (Leamington) |
| 1974-75 | 42 | 16 | 24 | 2 | - | 174 | 196 | 34 | 6th GLJHL | Lost semi-final 0-4 (Essex) |
| 1975-76 | 42 | 19 | 19 | 4 | - | 247 | 225 | 42 | 5th GLJHL | Did not qualify |
| 1976-77 | 42 | 10 | 24 | 8 | - | 176 | 231 | 28 | 7th GLJHL | Did not qualify |
| 1977-78 | 42 | 15 | 23 | 4 | - | 232 | 249 | 34 | 5th GLJHL | Did not qualify |
| 1978-79 | 40 | 6 | 28 | 6 | - | 207 | 307 | 18 | 8th GLJHL | Did not qualify |
| 1980-81 | 41 | 22 | 14 | 5 | - | 276 | 206 | 49 | 3rd GLJHL | Lost quarter-final 0-3 (Dresden) |
| 1981-82 | 38 | 27 | 8 | 3 | - | 295 | 165 | 57 | 1st GLJHL | Lost semi-final 3-4 (Essex) |
| 1982-83 | 39 | 19 | 17 | 3 | - | 257 | 257 | 41 | 5th GLJHL | Lost quarter-final 2-3 (Dresden) |
| 1983-84 | 39 | 25 | 9 | 5 | - | 265 | 210 | 55 | 3rd GLJHL | Won quarter-final 3-1 (Blenheim); Lost semi-final - 2-4 - (Dresden) |
| 1984-85 | 40 | 14 | 19 | 7 | - | 199 | 209 | 35 | 6th GLJHL | Won quarter-final 3-1 (Petrolia); Lost semi-final - 0-4 - (Belle River) |
| 1985-86 | 40 | 18 | 17 | 5 | - | 215 | 195 | 41 | 5th GLJHL | Won quarter-final 3-1 (Petrolia); Won semi-final - 4-0 - (Dresden); Lost final - 3-4 - (Essex) |
| 1986-87 | 40 | 16 | 21 | 3 | 0 | 163 | 212 | 35 | 7th GLJHL | Won quarter-final 4-3 (Petrolia); Lost semi-final - 0-4 - (Dresden) |
| 1987-88 | 37 | 23 | 10 | 1 | 3 | 203 | 144 | 50 | 3rd GLJHL | Won quarter-final 4-1 (Dresden); Won semi-final 4-3 (Petrolia); Won final 4-1 (Leamington); Won CSC Quarter-final 4-0 (Orangeville); Won CSC Semi-final 4-3 (Stoney Creek); Won Clarence Schmalz Cup 4-1 (Port Perry) |
| 1988-89 | 40 | 23 | 14 | 2 | 1 | 238 | 190 | 49 | 5th GLJHL | Lost div semi-final 4-5 (Dresden) |
| 1989-90 | 40 | 19 | 14 | 6 | 1 | 147 | 130 | 45 | 5th GLJHL | Lost quarter-final 2-4 (Clearwater) |
| 1990-91 | 41 | 22 | 18 | 0 | 1 | 181 | 192 | 45 | 4th GLJHL | Lost quarter-final 3-4 (Clearwater) |
| 1991-92 | 42 | 18 | 21 | 1 | 2 | 174 | 179 | 39 | 6th GLJHL | Won quarter-final 4-2 (Clearwater); Lost semi-final 0-4 (Walpole Island) |
| 1992-93 | 39 | 25 | 9 | 3 | 2 | 202 | 132 | 55 | 3rd GLJHL | Won quarter-final 4-0 (Dresden); Won semi-final 4-2 (Clearwater); Lost final 1-4 (Tilbury) |
| 1993-94 | 40 | 17 | 17 | 4 | 2 | 164 | 181 | 40 | 6th GLJHL | Won quarter-final 4-2 (Blenheim); Lost semi-final - 1-4 - (Clearwater) |
| 1994-95 | 40 | 18 | 17 | 4 | 1 | 164 | 149 | 41 | 5th GLJHL | Won quarter-final 4-3 (Kingsville); Lost semi-final - 0-4 - Belle River |
| 1995-96 | 41 | 22 | 11 | 6 | 2 | 163 | 133 | 52 | 2nd GLJHL | Won quarter-final 4-2 (Dresden); Lost semi-final - 1-4 - (Walpole Island) |
| 1996-97 | 39 | 25 | 10 | 3 | 1 | 180 | 138 | 55 | 2nd GLJHL | Won quarter-final 4-0 (Alvinston); Won semi-final 4-1 (Kingsville); Lost final 2-4 (Belle River) |
| 1997-98 | 45 | 9 | 28 | 4 | 4 | 139 | 213 | 26 | 9th GLJHL | Did not qualify |
| 1998-99 | 39 | 12 | 23 | 1 | 3 | 140 | 176 | 28 | 7th GLJHL | Lost quarter-final 1-4 (Wallaceburg) |
| 1999-00 | 41 | 21 | 16 | 3 | 1 | 172 | 158 | 46 | 4th GLJHL | Lost quarter-final 2-4 (Essex) |
| 2000-01 | 40 | 21 | 15 | 1 | 3 | 144 | 123 | 46 | 5th GLJHL | Lost quarter-final 3-4 (Essex) |
| 2001-02 | 40 | 22 | 16 | 1 | 1 | 173 | 161 | 46 | 4th GLJHL | Won quarter-final 4-3 (Belle River); Lost semi-final 1-4 (Essex) |
| 2002-03 | 40 | 10 | 26 | 1 | 3 | 104 | 160 | 24 | 8th GLJHL | Lost quarter-final 2-4 (Essex) |
| 2003-04 | 40 | 23 | 13 | 3 | 1 | 154 | 111 | 50 | 3rd GLJHL | Lost quarter-final 2-4 (Belle River) |
| 2004-05 | 40 | 19 | 13 | 5 | 3 | 146 | 127 | 46 | 5th GLJHL | Lost quarter-final 2-4 (Alvinston) |
| 2005-06 | 40 | 26 | 12 | 1 | 1 | 194 | 133 | 54 | 2nd GLJHL | Lost quarter-final 2-4 (Alvinston) |
| 2006-07 | 40 | 13 | 24 | 2 | 1 | 134 | 181 | 29 | 8th GLJHL | Lost quarter-final 0-4 (Essex) |
| 2007-08 | 40 | 13 | 21 | 3 | 3 | 137 | 200 | 32 | 7th GLJHL | Lost quarter-final 2-4 (Alvinston) |
| 2008-09 | 40 | 20 | 18 | - | 2 | 153 | 161 | 42 | 5th GLJHL | Won quarter-final 4-2 (Wallaceburg); Lost semi-final 3-4 (Dresden) |
| 2009-10 | 40 | 23 | 16 | - | 1 | 208 | 189 | 47 | 4th GLJHL | Lost quarter-final 3-4 (Dresden) |
| 2010-11 | 40 | 19 | 19 | - | 2 | 167 | 177 | 40 | 5th GLJHL | Won quarter-final 4-1 (Alvinston); Lost semi-final - 1-4 - (Belle River) |
| 2011-12 | 40 | 21 | 17 | - | 2 | 175 | 163 | 44 | 5th GLJHL | Won quarter-final 4-0 (Alvinston); Lost semi-final 1-4 (Belle River) |
| 2012-13 | 40 | 17 | 18 | - | 5 | 142 | 159 | 39 | 7th GLJHL | Lost quarter-final 1-4 (Belle River) |
| 2013-14 | 40 | 20 | 17 | - | 3 | 168 | 170 | 43 | 6th GLJHL | Lost quarter-final 2-4 (Blenheim) |
| 2014-15 | 40 | 16 | 21 | - | 3 | 142 | 172 | 35 | 8th GLJHL | Lost quarter-final 0-4 (Essex) |
| 2015-16 | 40 | 21 | 15 | 2 | 2 | 144 | 134 | 46 | 4th GLJHL | Won quarter-final 4-3 (Lakeshore); Lost semi-final 0-4 (Essex) |
| 2016-17 | 40 | 17 | 20 | 3 | - | 127 | 130 | 37 | 7th Stobbs | Lost div quarter-final 1-4 (Essex) |
| 2017-18 | 40 | 25 | 12 | 1 | 2 | 151 | 103 | 53 | 5th Stobbs | Won Div Quarter-final 4-3 (Amherstburg); Lost div semi-final 0-4 (Lakeshore) |
| 2018-19 | 40 | 19 | 16 | 1 | 4 | 139 | 121 | 43 | 5th Stobbs | Lost div quarter-final 0-4 (Amherstburg) |
| 2019-20 | 40 | 33 | 7 | 0 | 0 | 225 | 88 | 66 | 2nd Stobbs | Won Div Quarter-final 4-0 (Dresden); Won Div Semi-final 4-0 (Amherstburg); Div. Final cancelled due to COVID-19 pandemic. |
| 2020-21 | Season Lost due to COVID-19 pandemic | | | | | | | | | |
| 2021-22 | 32 | 24 | 6 | 0 | 2 | 157 | 90 | 50 | 3rd of 9 Stobbs | Won Div Quarter-final 1-4 (Blenheim); Lost div semi-finals 1-4 (Essex) |
| 2022-23 | 41 | 21 | 19 | 1 | 0 | 145 | 143 | 43 | 5th of 8 Stobbs | Won Div Quarter-final 4-2 (Blenheim); Lost div semi-finals 2-4 (Essex) |
| 2023-24 | 42 | 18 | 17 | 5 | 2 | 152 | 162 | 43 | 5th of 8 Stobbs | Lost Div Quarter-final 1-4 (Wheatley) |
| 2024-25 | 42 | 20 | 16 | 4 | 2 | 151 | 155 | 46 | 3rd of 8 Stobbs Div; 8th of 18 West Cont; 32nd of 63-PJHL | Lost Div Quarter-final 2-4 (Blenheim) |
| 2025-26 | 42 | 22 | 19 | 1 | 0 | 166 | 130 | 45 | 4th of 8 Stobbs Div; 9th of 18 West Cont; 33rd of 61-PJHL | Lost Div Quarter-final 2-4 (Amherstburg) |

== 2025-2026 Team Staff ==
- President - Bob Barnes
- Vice-President - Chuck Melton
- General Manager - John Baker
- Assistant General Manager - Tyler Hoadley
- Head coach - Mark Davis
- Assistant Coach - Jeff Perry
- Assistant Coach - Corey Laframboise
- Assistant Coach - Dawson Vautour
- Goalie Coach - Riley Collins
- Trainer - Jenn Stephenson
- Trainer - Jason Bourdage
- Equipment Manager - Ed Hoadley
- Equipment Manager - Ryan Dixon

== Clarence Schmalz Cup appearances ==
1988: Mooretown Flags defeated Port Perry Mojacks 4-games-to-1

== NHL alumni ==
- Brian Dobbin
- Jamie Fraser
