= Wheatley Sharks =

Canadian junior ice hockey team

- City: Wheatley, Ontario
- League: Provincial Junior Hockey League
- Conference: North
- Division: Stobbs
- Founded: 1995
- Home arena: Wheatley Area Arena
- Colours: Red, Blue, and White
- General manager: Thomas Grubb (2018–19)
- Head coach: Josh Carnevale (mid 2018–19)

Franchise history
- 1995–2001: Southpoint Sharks
- 2001–08: Wheatley-Southpoint Sharks
- 2008–present: Wheatley Omstead Sharks

The Wheatley Sharks are a junior hockey team based in Wheatley, Ontario, Canada. As of the 2016-17 season the Sharks began play in the Provincial Junior Hockey League of the Ontario Hockey Association. Previously, they were members of the Great Lakes Junior C Hockey League.

== History ==
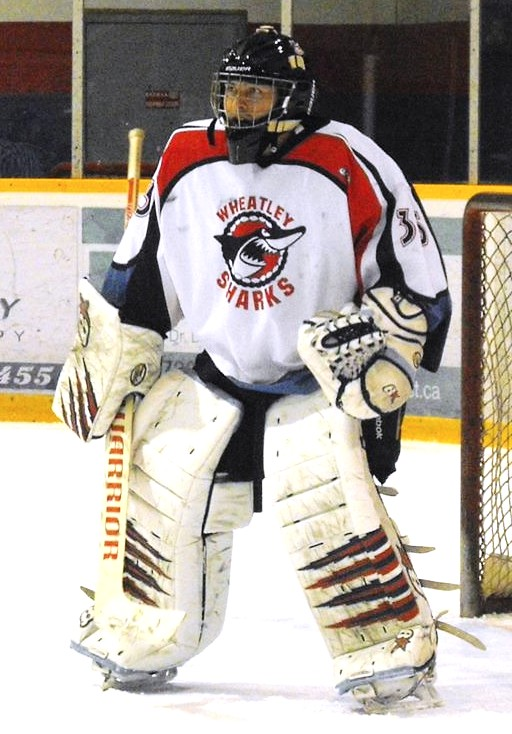
Sharks goalie during 2013-14 season.

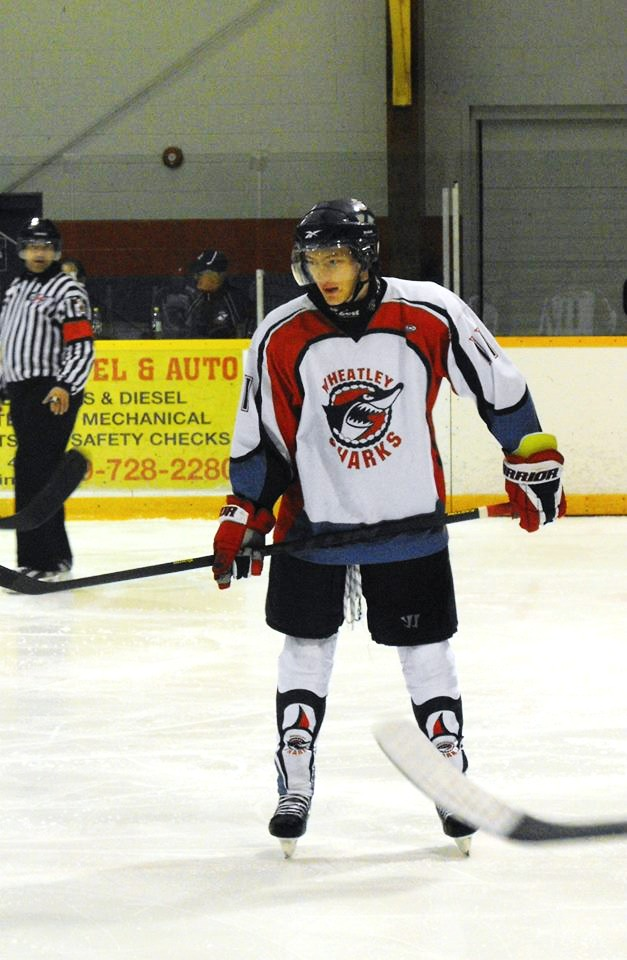
Sharks player during 2013-14 season.

The Wheatley Sharks were a member of the Great Lakes Junior C League since 1995–96. The Sharks have made it to the League Finals 4 times since the 2001–02 season but have never been able to win the Championship.

In the 2001–02 season the Sharks faced the Essex 73's in their first ever Finals appearance, the 73's would knock off the Sharks in a hard fought series which Essex won in 5 games, the following year the 73's and Sharks would meet once again in the Championship series, Essex would control this series once again beating the Sharks this time in 4 games.

In 2004–05 the 73's and Sharks would once again meet up this time in the League Semi-finals which many saw as a battle of the 2 best teams, it would be a classic series, the teams would play Game 7 at the Essex arena in front of over 1500 fans, Sharks held a 2-0 3rd period lead before the 73's battled back with 3 late goals to claim the series victory, Essex would go on to win the Provincial Championship.

The 2005–06 season would be the most successful season in Wheatley Sharks history as Head Coach Dave Wiper led them to a Regular Season Championship with a 1st Place finish with a record of 29–8–1–2. The Club would once again make it to the League Finals for the 3rd time and Face Essex once again this time having the advantage of Home ice, the 73's however would take the title in another classic series going 6 games.

In the 2008–09 season The Sharks would finish 3rd in the league and battle the Belle River Canadiens in first round battle, the Canadiens would take a 3-0 series lead only to see the Sharks battle back and tie the series forcing a game 7 in Belle River. The Canadiens would take the 7th game by a score of 7–1.

The Sharks had another successful season in 2010–11 finishing 21–16–3 would face the Essex 73's once again. The Sharks and 73's were tied 3–3 and another Game 7 in Essex for the Sharks, this time it would be Sharks that would come out on top with a 4–0 shutout win as the Sharks finally defeated the 73's in a playoff series, they would move onto the semi-finals and defeat the 1st place Wallaceburg Lakers in 6 games, however the Sharks lost in a classic 7 game series to the Belle River Canadiens as Belle River won their 2nd straight league title.

The 2011–12 edition of the Sharks would be a very successful one during the regular season, the club finished with a 24–15–1 record during the regular season, which was good enough for 3rd in the league. During the 2011–12 regular season the Sharks would set a team record with 12 straight wins at the Wheatley Arena and finish with a 16–3–1 home record, it was also a successful season for Kurtis Ouellette who won Defenceman of the year and Riley Babkirk who won Rookie of the year. The regular season success would not continue over to the playoffs though, the Sharks would fall in the 1st round to the Belle River Canadiens in 5 games.

The 2012–13 season would be another successful season in Wheatey. The Sharks would finish the season as the 3rd place team with an impressive record of 24–14–2. The Sharks would draw the 6th Seed Alvinston Flyers in the first round, the Sharks would sweep the Flyers in 4 straight games. Round 2 would bring their rivals from Belle River, the Canadiens held a 3–2 series lead heading back to Wheatley, the Sharks would force a game 7 with a 4–1 win on home ice, Game 7 would be dominated by the Sharks 4–0 and send Wheatley into the finals against the 73's. After losing their leading scorer Jon Woelk to a broken ankle in the previous round, and a few key components the 73's would eliminate the Sharks 4 straight to put an end to Wheatley's hopes for a first League Championship.

== Season-by-season record ==
Season	GP	W	L	T	OTL	GF	GA	P	Results	Playoffs
1995-96	43	20	19	2	2	153	158	43	5th GLJHL	Won quarter-final 4-0 (Amherstburg); Lost semi-final 0-4 (Belle River)
1996-97	40	18	12	5	5	200	169	46	5th GLJHL	Won quarter-final 4-2 (Wallaceburg); Lost semi-final 0-4 (Belle River)
1997-98	45	30	14	1	0	202	157	61	2nd GLJHL	Won quarter-final 4-1 (Dresden); Lost semi-final 0-4 (Essex)
1998-99	40	17	19	1	3	164	192	38	5th GLJHL	Lost semi-final 2-4 (Kingsville)
1999-00	41	12	22	5	2	130	164	31	7th GLJHL	Lost quarter-final 1-4 (Wallaceburg)
2000-01	40	12	25	2	1	134	181	27	8th GLJHL	Lost quarter-final 0-4 (Belle River)
2001-02	40	22	12	2	4	160	127	50	2nd GLJHL	Won quarter-final 4-1 (Wallaceburg); Won semi-final 4-3 (Kingsville); Lost final 1-4 (Essex)
2002-03	40	26	10	3	1	162	116	56	2nd GLJHL	Won quarter-final 4-3 (Dresden); Won semi-final 4-3 (Alvinston); Lost final 0-4 (Essex)
2003-04	40	15	20	1	4	125	138	35	7th GLJHL	Won quarter-final 4-2 (Alvinston); Lost semi-final 1-4 (Essex)
2004-05	40	19	13	8	0	166	137	46	6th GLJHL	Won quarter-final 4-2 (Kingsville); Lost semi-final 3-4 (Essex)
2005-06	40	29	8	1	2	185	114	61	1st GLJHL	Won quarter-final 4-1 (Blenheim); Won semi-final 4-2 (Alvinston); Lost final 2-4 (Essex)
2006-07	40	26	9	2	3	201	163	57	3rd GLJHL	Won quarter-final 4-0 (Kingsville); Lost semi-final 3-4 (Belle River)
2007-08	39	14	20	4	1	167	171	33	6th GLJHL	Lost quarter-final 1-4 (Essex)
2008-09	40	22	14	-	4	167	148	48	3rd GLJHL	Lost quarter-final 3-4 (Belle River)
2009-10	40	19	18	-	3	174	170	41	5th GLJHL	Lost quarter-final 1-4 (Essex)
2010-11	40	21	16	-	3	142	144	45	4th GLJHL	Won quarter-final 4-3 (Essex); Won semi-final 4-2 (Wallaceburg); Lost final 3-4 (Belle River)
2011-12	40	24	15	-	1	157	119	49	3rd GLJHL	Lost quarter-final 1-4 (Belle River)
2012-13	40	24	14	-	2	153	122	50	3rd GLJHL	Won quarters - 4-0 (Alvinston); Won semi's 3-4 (Belle River); Lost final 0-4 (Essex)
2013-14	40	22	16	-	2	160	137	46	4th GLJHL	Won quarters - 4-2 (Alvinston); Lost semi's 0-4 (Essex)
2014-15	40	17	20	-	3	131	149	37	7th GLJHL	Lost quarters 0-4 (Amherstburg)
2015-16	40	19	17	2	2	141	171	42	6th GLJHL	Lost quarters 0-4 (Amherstburg)
2016-17	40	18	21	1	-	157	171	37	6th Stobbs	Lost Div. Quarters 2-4 (Amherstburg)
2017-18	40	13	24	0	3	121	163	29	7th Stobbs	Lost Div. Quarters 0-4 (Dresden)
2018-19	40	16	22	0	2	106	145	34	7th Stobbs	Lost div quarter-final 0-4 (Lakeshore)
2019-20	40	19	19	1	1	122	124	40	5th of 9 Stobbs	Lost div quarter-final 2-4 (Essex)
2020-21	Season Lost due to COVID-19 pandemic									
2021-22	32	16	15	0	1	125	97	33	5th of 9 Stobbs	Won Div Quarter-final 4-0 (Amherstburg); Lost div semi-finals 2-4 (Lakeshore)
2022-23	42	27	11	3	1	165	99	58	3rd of 8 Stobbs	Won Div Quarter-final 4-0 (Amherstburg); Lost div semi-finals 2-4 (Lakeshore)
2023-24	42	25	14	2	1	180	99	108	4th of 8 Stobbs	Won Div Quarter-final 4-1 (Mooretown); Lost Div Semifinal 0-4 (Lakeshore)
2024-25	42	21	20	1	0	141	137	43	4th of 8 Stobbs Div; 9th of 18 West Conf; 33rd of 63 PJHL	Lost Div Quarter-final 1-4 (Amherstburg)
2025-26	42	17	24	1	0	121	148	35	6th of 8 Stobbs Div; 13th of 18 West Conf; 42nd of 61 PJHL	Lost Div Quarter-final 0-4 (Blenheim)

== 2019-2020 Executive/Staff ==
- Governor - Darryl Glasier
- Director of Hockey Operations - Darryl Glasier
- General Manager - Thomas Grubb
- Head coach - Josh Carnevale
- Assistant coach - Ian Faubert
- Assistant coach - Paul Gossman
- Assistant coach - Adam Hatt
- Goalie Coach - Marc tremblay
- Strength & Conditioning - Dylan Enns
- Head trainer - Dr. Mark Dubreuil
- Trainer - Ken Dawson
- Equipment Managers - Rick Woelk, Tim Oliphant, Jay Riediger
