= Blenheim Blades =

Canadian junior ice hockey team

- City: Blenheim, Ontario
- League: Provincial Junior Hockey League
- Conference: West
- Division: Stobbs
- Founded: 1965
- Home arena: Blenheim Memorial Arena
- Colours: Red, yellow, black and white
- General manager: Bob Price
- Head coach: Grant Spence (2025–26)

Franchise history
- Blenheim Golden Blades (1965–74); Blenheim Blades (1974–)

The Blenheim Blades are a Canadian junior ice hockey team based in Blenheim, Ontario. They play in the Provincial Junior Hockey League of the Ontario Hockey Association and Hockey Canada.

The Blemheim Blades also has a women's team, of the same name, in the Ontario Women's Hockey Association

== History ==
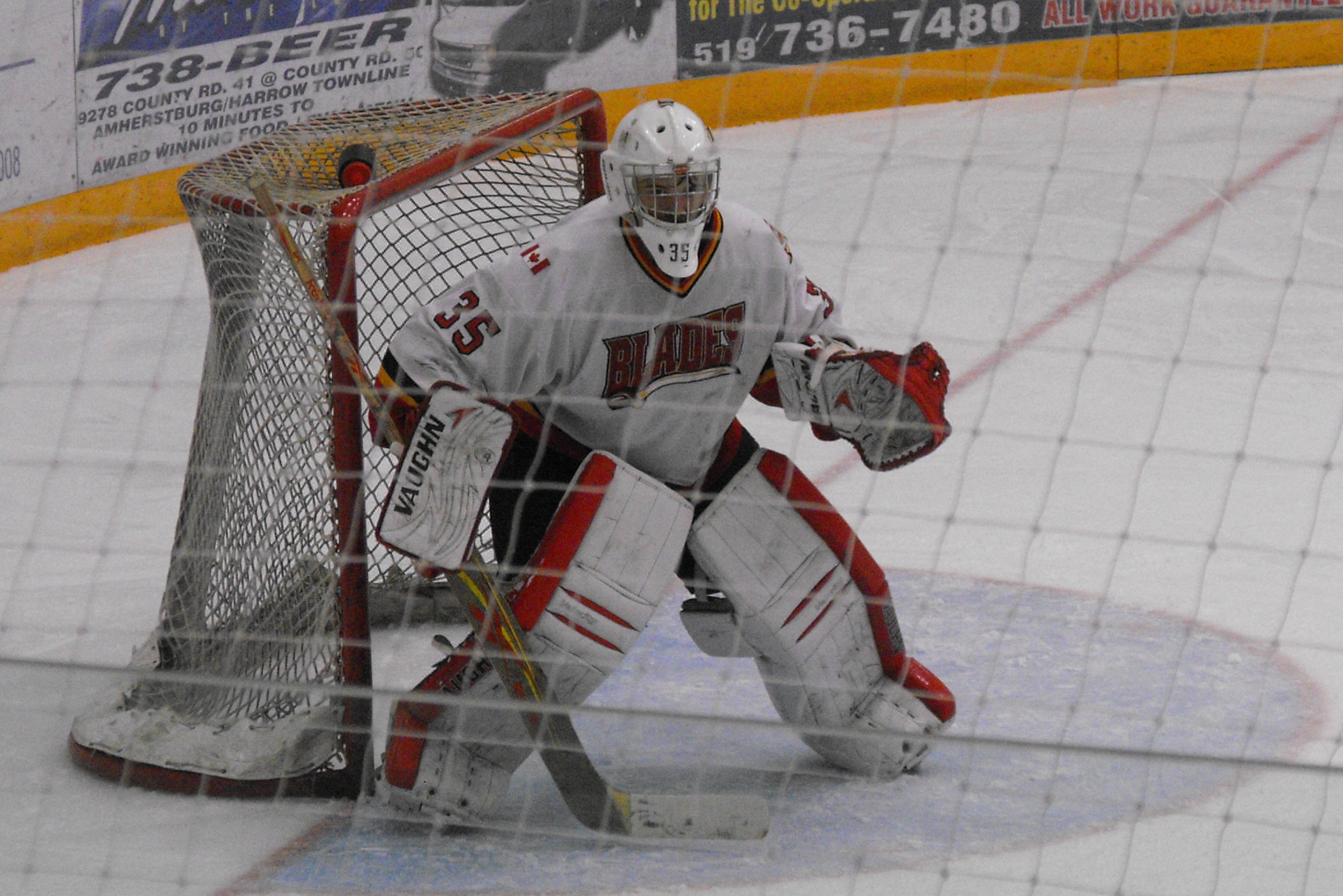
Blenheim Blades goaltender during the 2013–14 season

The Blenheim Golden Blades were founded in 1965, but could not find a league to play in locally until 1967. Until 1967, the Blades played an exhibition season against teams from Michigan in an American Junior B league until the OHA playoffs began.

In 1968, the Golden Blades joined the Border Cities Junior "B" Hockey League. In 1971, the league was demoted and renamed the Great Lakes Junior "C" Hockey League. In 1974, the team simplified their name to the "Blades".

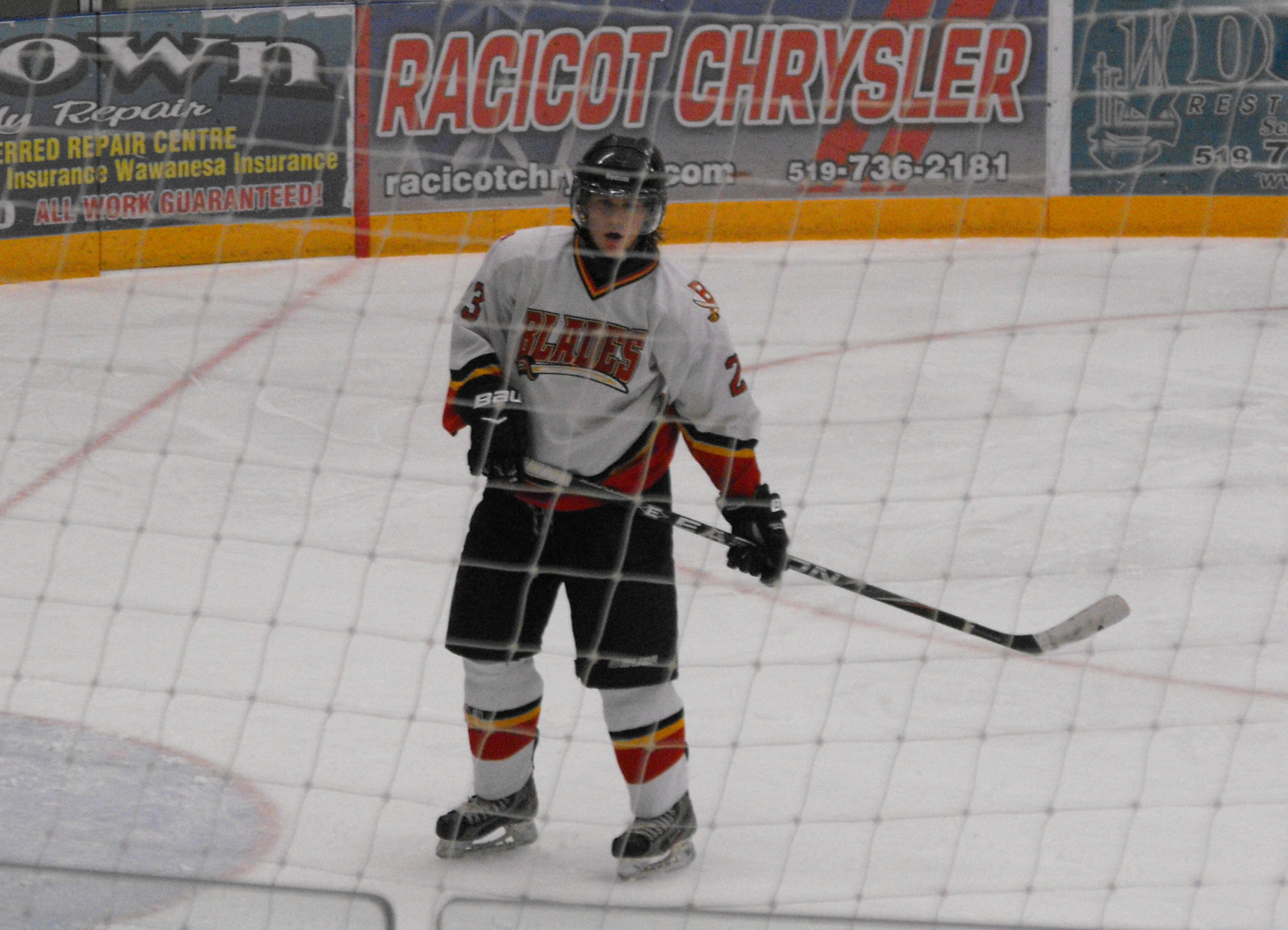
Blades player during the 2013–14 season

The Blades have won a league title in their franchise history, the 1970 Border Cities Jr. D championship.

The blades have struggled in the past due to being from a smaller community, but in recent years have seen more success.

The playoffs for the 2019–20 season were cancelled due to the COVID-19 pandemic, leading to the team not being able to play a single game.

== Season-by-season record ==
Season	GP	W	L	T	OTL	GF	GA	P	Results	Playoffs
1967–68	24	7	9	8	-	101	94	22	5th BWJHL	
1968–69	31	20	9	2	-	151	98	42	3rd BCJHL	
1969–70	34	12	21	1	-	103	158	25	4th BCJHL	"D" Champions
1970–71	39	10	28	1	-	136	227	21	5th GLJHL	
1971–72	36	1	33	2	-	87	292	4	7th GLJHL	DNQ
1972–73	42	9	33	0	-	158	278	18	7th GLJHL	DNQ
1973–74	43	4	38	1	-	119	379	9	10th GLJHL	DNQ
1974–75	42	3	36	3	-	124	350	9	8th GLJHL	DNQ
1975–76	38	1	36	1	-	103	370	3	7th GLJHL	DNQ
1976–77	42	20	15	7	-	221	207	47	3rd GLJHL	Lost Div Semis 3–4 (Essex)
1977–78	42	16	25	1	-	194	256	33	6th GLJHL	DNQ
1978–79	40	26	11	3	-	292	197	55	1st GLJHL	Won Div Semis 3–1 (Dresden); Lost Div Finals 3–4 (Leamington)
1979–80	42	18	20	4	-	195	225	40	3rd GLJHL	Lost Div Semis 1–4 (Leamington)
1980–81	41	6	30	5	-	169	335	17	8th GLJHL	DNQ
1981–82	38	4	33	1	-	156	352	9	8th GLJHL	DNQ
1982–83	36	6	27	3	-	129	287	15	7th GLJHL	DNQ
1983–84	40	21	15	4	-	244	229	46	4th GLJHL	Lost Div Quarters 1–3 (Mooretown)
1984–85	39	19	15	5	-	175	165	43	5th GLJHL	Lost Div Quarters 2–3 (Dresden)
1985–86	40	18	18	4	-	192	191	40	6th GLJHL	Lost Div Quarters 1–3 (Essex)
1986–87	40	19	17	3	1	228	205	42	5th GLJHL	Lost Div Quarters (Dresden)
1987–88	39	12	21	4	2	153	211	30	9th GLJHL	DNQ
1988–89	40	7	31	1	1	125	314	16	11th GLJHL	DNQ
1989–90	40	1	37	2	0	102	320	4	11th GLJHL	DNQ
1990–91	42	4	32	4	2	123	242	14	10th GLJHL	DNQ
1991–92	46	14	23	3	6	173	178	37	8th GLJHL	Lost Div Quarters 2–4 (Walpole Island)
1992–93	39	20	12	2	5	198	148	47	6th GLJHL	Lost Div Quarters 3–4 (Clearwater)
1993–94	37	17	14	5	1	177	167	40	5th GLJHL	Lost Div Quarters 2–4 (Mooretown)
1994–95	41	26	12	2	1	203	142	55	2nd GLJHL	Won Div Quarters 4–0 (Alvinston); Won Div Semis 4–3 (Clearwater); Lost Div Finals 0–4 (Belle River)
1995–96	40	3	33	1	3	104	221	10	11th GLJHL	DNQ
1996–97	36	8	26	2	0	98	181	18	10th GLJHL	DNQ
1997–98	45	7	36	2	0	143	236	16	10th GLJHL	DNQ
1998–99	41	17	22	1	1	183	194	36	6th GLJHL	Lost Div Quarters 0–4 (Essex)
1999–00	43	13	23	4	3	146	189	33	6th GLJHL	Lost Div Quarters 0–4 (Kingsville)
2000–01	39	4	32	0	3	121	233	11	9th GLJHL	DNQ
2001–02	40	5	31	1	3	112	233	14	9th GLJHL	DNQ
2002–03	40	14	20	5	1	148	181	34	6th GLJHL	Lost Div Quarters 1–4 (Alvinston)
2003–04	40	12	24	1	3	128	183	28	8th GLJHL	Lost Div Quarters 0–4 (Essex)
2004–05	40	7	27	4	2	112	208	20	8th GLJHL	Lost Div Quarters 0–4 (Essex)
2005–06	40	6	32	1	1	114	228	14	8th GLJHL	Lost Div Quarters 1–4 (Wheatley-Southpoint)
2006–07	40	8	26	2	3	117	229	22	9th GLJHL	DNQ
2007–08	40	12	26	2	0	120	192	26	8th GLJHL	Lost Div Quarters 0–4 (Wallaceburg)
2008–09	40	14	25	-	1	130	173	29	7th GLJHL	Lost Div Quarters 2–4 (Dresden)
2009–10	40	11	29	-	0	169	245	22	9th GLJHL	DNQ
2010–11	39	14	25	-	0	115	187	28	8th GLJHL	Lost Div Quarters 1–4 (Wallaceburg)
2011–12	40	23	16	-	1	180	144	47	4th GLJHL	Lost Div Quarters 1–4 (Dresden)
2012–13	40	21	18	-	1	122	140	43	5th GLJHL	Lost Div Quarters 2–4 (Dresden)
2013–14	40	21	14	-	5	162	146	47	3rd GLJHL	Won Div Quarters 4–2 (Mooretown); Lost semi-final 2–4 (Belle River)
2014–15	40	21	17	-	2	121	134	44	4th GLJHL	Won quarters – 4–2 (Alvinston); Lost semi-final – 2–4 (Amherstburg)
2015–16	40	25	13	1	1	159	126	52	2nd GLJHL	Won quarters – 4–2 (Dresden); Lost semi-final – 2–4 (Amherstburg)
2016–17	40	24	14	2	-	163	136	50	4th Stobbs	Won Div Quarters, 4–2 (Dresden); Lost div semi-final. 2–4 (Lakeshore)
2017–18	40	12	25	0	3	124	165	27	8th Stobbs	Lost Div Quarters, 0–4 (Lakeshore)
2018–19	40	17	20	2	1	133	146	37	6th Stobbs	Lost div quarter-final 1–4 (Dresden)
2019–20	40	11	24	2	3	92	157	27	8th of 9 Stobbs	Lost div quarter-final 0–4 (Lakeshore)
2020–21	Season Lost due to COVID-19 pandemic									
2021–22	32	14	18	0	0	116	126	28	6th of 9 Stobbs	Lost div quarter-final 1–4 (Mooretown)
2022–23	42	24	14	4	0	136	112	52	4th of 8 Stobbs	Lost div quarter-final 2–4 (Mooretown)
2023–24	42	28	12	1	1	184	134	58	3rd of 8 Stobbs	Won div quarter-final 4–1 (Amherstburg); Lost Div. Semifinals 0–4 (Essex)
2024–25	42	20	20	2	0	153	160	42	5th of 8 Stobbs Div; 12th of 16 West Conf; 38th of 63 – PJHL	Won div quarter-final 4–2 (Mooretown); Lost Div. Semifinals 1–4 (Essex)
2025–26	42	31	10	2	0	160	111	62	3rd of 8 Stobbs Div; 3rd of 16 West Conf; 13th of 61 – PJHL	Won div quarter-final 4–0 (Wheatley); Lost Div. Semifinals 3–4 (Lakeshore)

== 2024–25 team staff ==
- President – Matthew Frain
- General Manager – Bob Price
- Assistant General Manager – Lonnie Hamilton
- Director of Hockey Operations – Wayne Cowell
- Director of Player Personal – Bill Saunders
- Head coach – Shawn Simpson
- Assistant coach – Norm Logan
- Assistant coach – Marc Swayze
- Equipment Manager – Stu Fletcher
- Goalie coach – Jacob Fancy
- Trainer – Jacob Fancy
- Assistant Trainer – Will Tetzlaff
- Photographer – Heather Jones
- Videographer – Cameron Sinasac

== Women's team ==
The Blenheim Blades also have a women's team in the Ontario Women's Hockey Association. The program began in the 2001–02 season and won their first provincial championship in the 2005–06 season.

== Notable alumni ==
- Chris Allen
- Bob Gryp
- Ryan Jones
- Matt Martin
- Todd Warriner
