= Walpole Island Wild =

Canadian junior ice hockey team

- City: Walpole Island, Ontario
- League: Provincial Junior Hockey League
- Founded: 1972
- Home arena: Walpole Island Sports Complex.
- Colours: Turquoise, Black, and White
- Owner: Walpole Island First Nation
- General manager: Scott Gorry
- Head coach: Louie Blackbird

Franchise history
- 1972–2019: Wallaceburg Lakers
- 2019–2023: Wallaceburg ThunderHawks
- 2023–present: Walpole Island Wild

Championships
- League champions: 1999

The Walpole Island Wild are a Canadian Junior ice hockey club based in Walpole Island, Ontario. They play in the Provincial Junior Hockey League of the Ontario Hockey Association.

== History ==
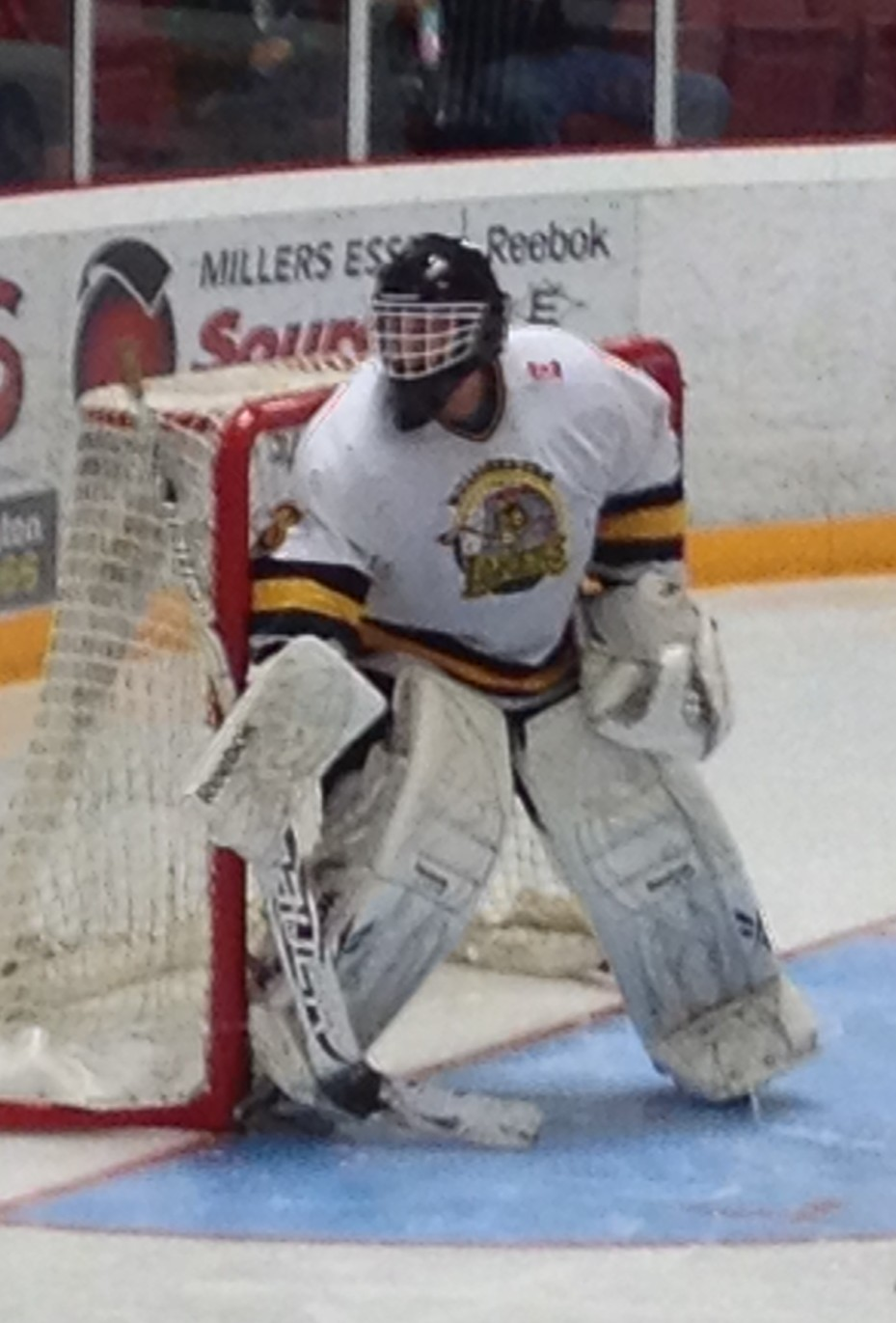
Lakers' goalie during 2013-14 season.

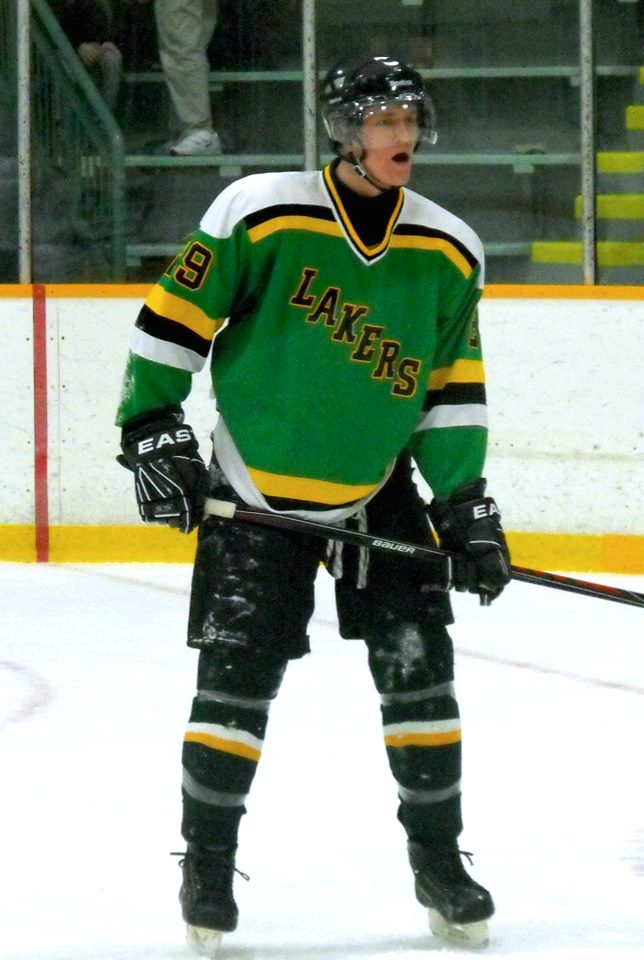
Lakers' skater during 2014-15 season.

The Wallaceburg Thunderhawks have made the All-Ontario Final once since 1972, in 1999 they lost the Clarence Schmalz Cup to the Glanbrook Rangers. From the 1997-98 season to the 2000-2001 season the Lakers made it to the Great Lakes Junior C Finals. Winning the League Championship in 1998-99 season. The Lakers Revamped themselves in the 2006-2007 season, with Head Coach Mark Davis returning to the club, as they knocked off the 4th seeded Dresden Jr. Kings in a 6 game series for their first series win in 5 years, They would lose in the League Semi-finals to the League Champion Essex 73's in a hard fought 5 game series. In 2007-2008 The Lakers won the north division title and breezed past the Blenheim Blades in the first round 4-0. Round 2 brought on the Mooretown Flags which also brought a 4 game sweep. The Lakers would then face their rivals from Essex the 3 time defending League champions. The Lakers battled their hearts out right to the end but were no match for the 73's as Essex swept the finals in 4 games and claimed their 4th straight League Title.

On December 28, 2008, tragedy struck the Wallaceburg Lakers organization as they lost a valuable member of their team. 19-year-old Tristan Carswell (Forward, #16) died suddenly in his sleep. In the first game the Wallaceburg Lakers played following the death of Carswell, the Lakers coach asked in a pre-game speech for Tristan to send down a message to let them know he's still with them. The Lakers proceeded to score a goal 16 seconds into the game, and then again with 16 seconds remaining in the game. His jersey was retired at a ceremony February 4, 2009 in a game against Dresden.

During a tumultuous off-season in 2019, the ownership group of the Lakers dubiously applied to the Ontario Hockey Association for relocation to Tilbury, Ontario. The move was rejected by the OHA.

== Season-by-season record ==
Season	GP	W	L	T	OTL	GF	GA	P	Results	Playoffs
1972-73	42	20	19	3	-	197	179	43	4th GLJHL	Won semi-final 3-0 (Kings); Lost final 1-4 (Flyers)
1973-74	43	16	22	5	-	233	258	37	7th GLJHL	Lost semi-final 1-4 (73's)
1974-75	42	26	13	3	-	249	167	55	3rd GLJHL	Lost quarter-final 1-3 (Bulldogs)
1975-76	42	19	19	4	-	215	211	42	4th GLJHL	Lost semi-final 1-4 (73's)
1976-77	42	13	25	4	-	203	249	30	6th GLJHL	DNQ
1977-78	42	20	19	3	-	259	266	43	4th GLJHL	Lost semi-final 0-3 (73's)
1978-79	40	24	14	2	-	275	232	50	3rd GLJHL	Lost quarter-final 1-2 (Kings)
1979-80	42	17	20	5	-	257	219	39	4th GLJHL	Lost quarter-final 1-4 (73's)
1980-81	40	17	19	4	-	183	244	38	5th GLJHL	Lost quarter-final 1-3 (Flyers)
1981-82	38	12	26	0	-	195	240	24	7th GLJHL	Lost quarter-final 2-3 (Kings)
1982-83	39	27	7	5	-	234	157	59	2nd GLJHL	Won semi-final 4-1 (Kings); Lost final 1-4 (Flyers)
1983-84	40	6	31	3	-	144	288	15	7th GLJHL	DNQ
1984-85	40	13	22	5	-	187	197	31	8th GLJHL	Lost quarter-final 0-3 (73's)
1985-86	40	11	23	6	-	183	224	28	8th GLJHL	Lost quarter-final 2-3 (Kings)
1986-87	39	8	28	2	1	153	235	19	8th GLJHL	DNQ
1987-88	38	23	13	1	1	215	180	48	4th GLJHL	Lost quarter-final 1-4 (Jets)
1988-89	40	10	26	3	1	148	246	24	9th GLJHL	Lost Div quarter-final 1-4 (Jets)
1989-90	40	15	19	3	3	182	165	36	9th GLJHL	DNQ
1990-91	Did Not Participate									
1991-92	41	1	37	2	1	97	367	5	11th GLJHL	DNQ
1992-93	40	0	40	0	0	104	341	0	11th GLJHL	DNQ
1993-94	38	8	26	2	2	128	238	20	10th GLJHL	DNQ
1994-95	42	3	34	3	2	111	286	11	11th GLJHL	DNQ
1995-96	39	12	25	1	1	121	197	26	10th GLJHL	DNQ
1996-97	39	19	12	6	2	167	161	46	4th GLJHL	Lost quarter-final 2-4 (Sharks)
1997-98	46	21	17	7	1	173	140	50	5th GLJHL	Won quarter-final 4-0 (Flyers); Won semi-final 4-1 (Canadiens); Lost final 1-4 (73's)
1998-99	40	32	7	0	1	209	109	65	2nd GLJHL	Won quarter-final 4-1 (Flags); Won semi-final 4-2 (73's); Won League 4-3 (Canadiens); Won CSC semi-final 4-1 (Bulldogs); Lost CSC Final 0-4 (Rangers)
1999-00	39	29	7	3	0	191	110	61	2nd GLJHL	Won quarter-final 4-1 (Sharks); Won semi-final 4-1 (Comets); Lost final 3-4 (Canadiens)
2000-01	40	24	14	1	1	152	138	50	3rd GLJHL	Won quarter-final 4-2 (Kings); Won semi-final 4-2 (73's); Lost final 0-4 (Canadiens)
2001-02	40	15	18	6	1	131	143	37	7th GLJHL	Lost quarter-final 1-4 (Sharks)
2002-03	40	5	27	4	4	125	208	18	9th GLJHL	DNQ
2003-04	40	8	29	1	2	107	192	19	9th GLJHL	DNQ
2004-05	40	4	34	1	1	69	215	10	9th GLJHL	DNQ
2005-06	40	3	35	1	1	83	287	8	9th GLJHL	DNQ
2006-07	40	19	17	2	2	168	142	42	5th GLJHL	Won quarter-final 4-2 (Kings); Lost semi-final 1-4 (73's)
2007-08	39	24	11	2	2	187	127	52	3rd GLJHL	Won quarter-final 4-0 (Blades); Won semi-final 4-0 (Flags); Lost final 0-4 (73's)
2008-09	40	18	19	-	3	166	179	39	6th GLJHL	Lost quarter-final 2-4 (Flags)
2009-10	40	27	10	-	3	191	128	57	3rd GLJHL	Won quarter-final 4-0 (Flyers); Won semi-final 4-1 (Kings); Lost-final 0-4 (Canadiens)
2010-11	40	30	8	-	2	168	113	62	1st GLJHL	Won quarter-final 4-1 (Blades); Lost semi-final 2-4 (Sharks)
2011-12	40	9	29	-	2	129	216	20	9th GLJHL	DNQ
2012-13	40	11	27	-	2	125	210	24	9th GLJHL	DNQ
2013-14	40	5	34	-	1	94	234	11	9th GLJHL	DNQ
2014-15	40	6	31	-	3	87	190	15	9th GLJHL	DNQ
2015-16	40	3	37	-	0	88	251	6	9th GLJHL	DNQ
2016-17	40	3	36	1	-	78	253	7	9th Stobbs	DNQ
2017-18	40	3	37	0	0	67	261	6	9th Stobbs	DNQ
2018-19	40	1	37	0	2	56	226	4	9th Stobbs	DNQ
Wallaceburg ThunderHawks
2019-20	40	4	35	0	1	69	204	9	9th of 9 Stobbs	DNQ
2020-21	Season Lost due to COVID-19 pandemic									
2021-22	32	5	24	2	1	64	184	13	8th of 9 Stobbs	Lost Div. Quarter finals 0-4 (Canadiens)
2022-23	42	4	35	3	0	91	262	11	8th of 8 Stobbs	Lost Div. Quarter finals 0-4 (73's)
Walpole Island Wild
2023-24	42	6	36	0	0	73	249	12	8th of 8 Stobbs	Lost Div. Quarter finals 0-4 (Canadiens)
2024-25	42	4	36	2	1	80	264	10	8th of 8 Stobbs; 16th of 16 Conf; 61st of 63 PJHL	Lost Div. Quarter finals 0-4 (73's)
2025-26	42	2	39	1	0	64	296	5	8th of 8 Stobbs; 16th of 16 Conf; 61st of 61 PJHL	Lost Div. Quarter finals 0-4 (73's)

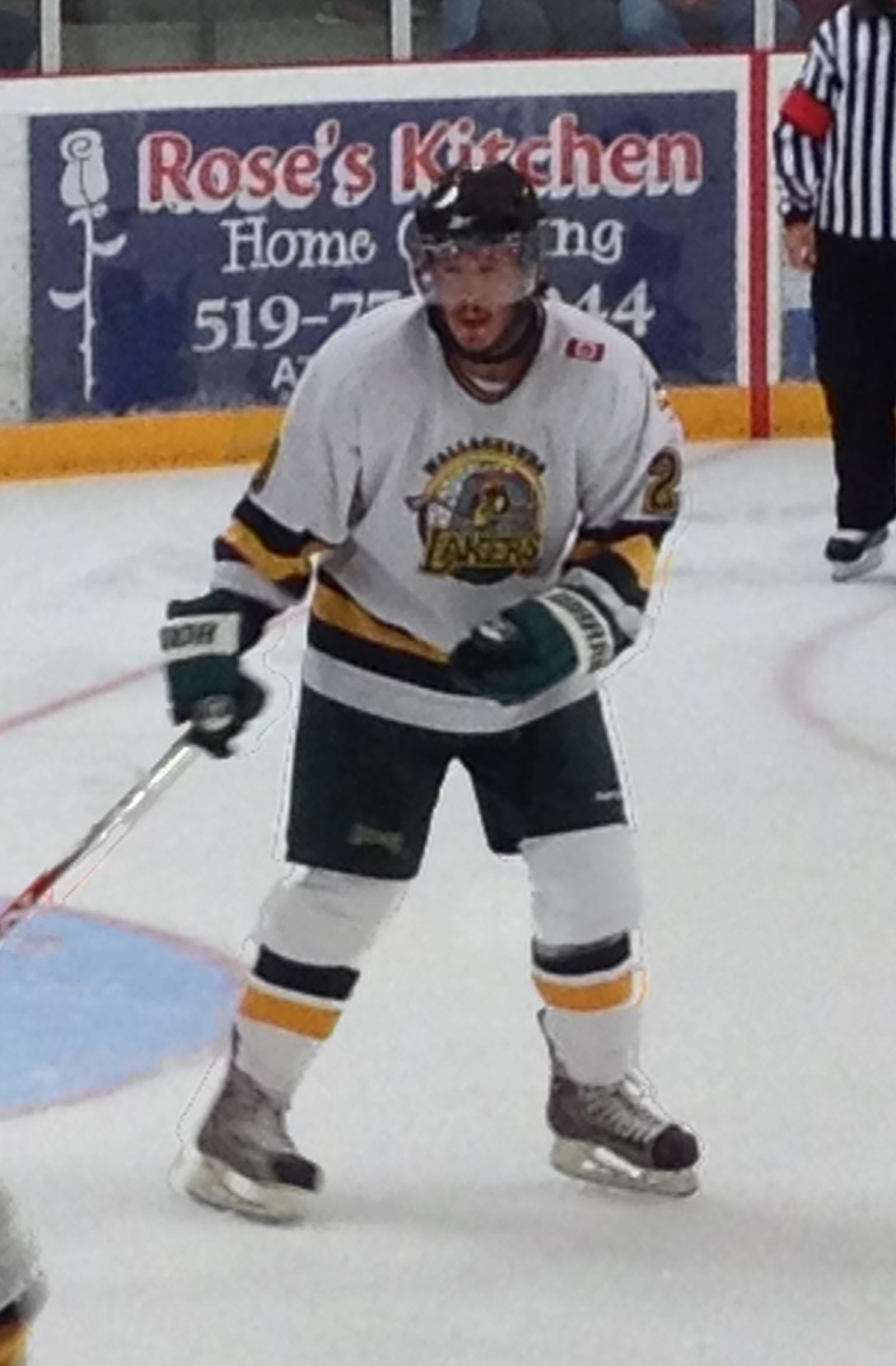
Lakers' skater during 2013-14 season.

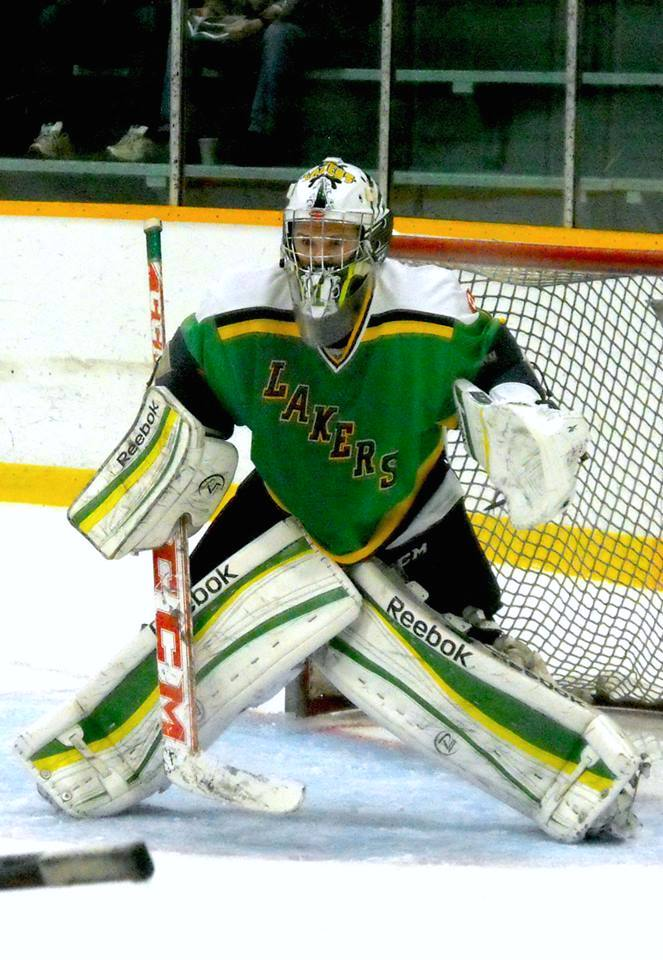
Lakers' goalie during 2014-15 season.

== Clarence Schmalz Cup appearances ==
1999: Glanbrook Rangers defeated Wallaceburg Lakers 4-games-to-none
