= Petrolia Flyers =

Canadian junior ice hockey team

- City: Petrolia, Ontario
- League: Provincial Junior Hockey League
- Division: Bill Stobbs
- Founded: 1988
- Home arena: Greenwood Recreation Centre
- Colours: Blue, Red, and White
- General manager: Dennis Meston
- Head coach: Chris Fryfogle

Franchise history
- 1988–2016: Alvinston Flyers; 2016–present: Petrolia Flyers

The Petrolia Flyers are a Canadian junior ice hockey team based in Petrolia, Ontario. They play in the Provincial Junior Hockey League of the Ontario Hockey Association and Hockey Canada. From 1988 until 2016, the team was known as the Alvinston Flyers, which played in the Great Lakes Jr C Hockey League.

== History ==
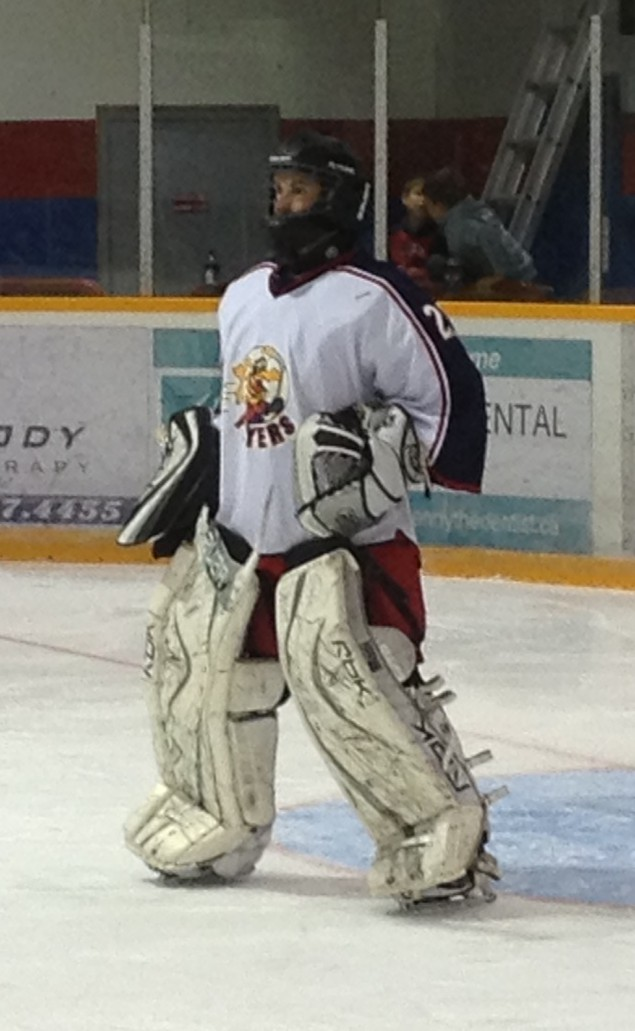
Flyers goaltender setting up for an out-of-zone face-off in Belle River, Ontario during the 2013-14 season.

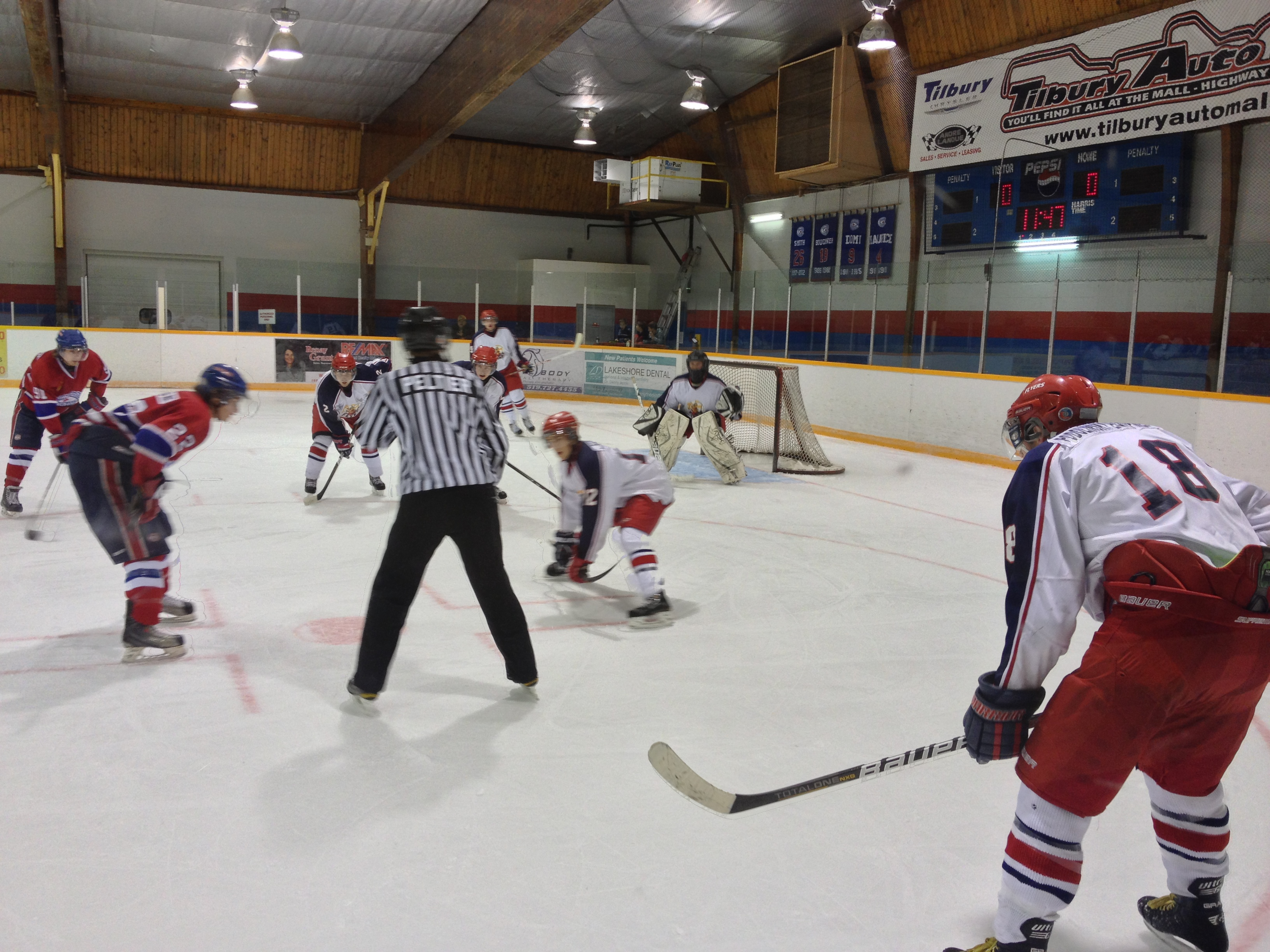
Flyers lining up for a face-off in the defensive zone at the Belle River Canadiens' 2013 home opener.

The Flyers were founded in 1988 as members of the Western Junior D Hockey League. The Flyers only managed two wins during the 1988-89 season and six in the 1989-90 season. In 1992-93, the Flyers finally showed some promise in the (then) OHA Junior Development League with a record of 22-15-1-0. Unfortunately for the Flyers, the OHAJDL had swelled up to 18 teams by then and despite a good record, with so many teams, the Flyers only managed to place sixth. After six seasons with the WJDHL/OHAJDL, the Flyers were promoted to the Great Lakes Junior C Hockey League.

From the year the Flyers joined, 1994-95, until the 2012-13 season, the Flyers finished as high as second place in the league standings (2003-04, 25-13-1-1), but were not able to have any real success in the league playoffs. From the 2007 playoffs until the 2013 playoffs, the Flyers were eliminated in the quarter-finals 6 times and did not qualify in 2009.

In February 2016, Flyers management submitted a proposal to relocate the team to Petrolia starting the next season. The proposal was accepted and the team moved to Petrolia. During the summer of 2016 the Great Lakes Junior C Hockey League was amalgamated into the Provincial Junior Hockey League.

In June 2022, the Flyers moved from the Stobbs division to the Yeck division. In the 2024-25 playoffs, the Flyers defeated the Exeter Hawks in 6 games to win their first division title. They would be swept by the Essex 73's in the West Conference Final.

== Season-by-season record ==
Season	GP	W	L	T	OTL	GF	GA	P	Results	Playoffs
1988-89	35	2	33	0	-	91	296	4	19th WJDHL	
1989-90	35	6	23	6	-	130	227	18	15th WJDHL	
1990-91	40	9	29	2	0	122	230	20	17th WJDHL	
1991-92	40	14	19	5	2	164	177	35	11th OHAJDL	
1992-93	38	22	15	1	0	183	161	45	7th OHAJDL	
1993-94	40	13	26	1	-	146	207	27	15th OHAJDL	Lost quarter-final
Southern Ontario Junior Hockey League - Jr "C"
1994-95	40	18	18	3	1	139	138	40	6th GLJHL	Lost quarter-final 0-4 (Blenheim)
1995-96	41	14	24	3	0	150	160	31	9th GLJHL	Lost quarter-final 0-4 (Walpole Island)
1996-97	40	15	18	4	3	133	145	37	8th GLJHL	Lost quarter-final 0-4 (Mooretown)
1997-98	44	24	14	3	3	168	142	54	4th GLJHL	Lost quarter-final 0-4 (Wallaceburg)
1998-99	40	6	31	1	2	109	217	15	10th GLJHL	DNQ
1999-00	40	7	28	4	1	118	198	19	9th GLJHL	DNQ
2000-01	39	15	20	1	3	160	169	34	7th GLJHL	Lost quarter-final 1-4 (Kingsville)
2001-02	40	19	18	3	0	159	160	41	6th GLJHL	Lost quarter-final 0-4 (Kingsville)
2002-03	40	26	12	1	1	166	118	54	3rd GLJHL	Won quarter-final 4-1 (Blenheim); Lost semi-final 3-4 (Wheatley-Southpoint)
2003-04	40	25	13	1	1	166	120	52	2nd GLJHL	Lost quarter-final 2-4 (Wheatley)
2004-05	40	22	10	4	4	172	136	52	3rd GLJHL	Won quarter-final 4-3 (Mooretown); Lost semi-final 2-4 (Dresden)
2005-06	40	17	19	3	1	148	157	38	7th GLJHL	Won quarter-final 4-2 (Mooretown); Lost semi-final 2-4 (Wheatley-Southpoint)
2006-07	40	13	23	2	2	144	195	30	7th GLJHL	Lost quarter-final 1-4 (Belle River)
2007-08	40	16	18	1	5	119	152	38	4th GLJHL	Lost quarter-final 3-4 (Mooretown)
2008-09	40	12	25	-	3	144	218	27	9th GLJHL	DNQ
2009-10	40	12	27	-	1	156	262	25	8th GLJHL	Lost quarter-final 0-4 (Wallaceburg)
2010-11	40	16	21	-	3	149	171	35	6th GLJHL	Lost quarter-final 1-4 (Mooretown)
2011-12	40	19	17	-	4	167	169	42	6th GLJHL	Lost quarter-final 0-4 (Mooretown)
2012-13	40	20	17	1	2	153	146	43	6th GLJHL	Lost quarter-final 0-4 (Wheatley)
2013-14	40	22	17	-	1	169	157	45	5th GLJHL	Lost quarter-final 3-4 (Wheatley)
2014-15	40	19	17	-	4	142	145	42	5th GLJHL	Lost quarter-final 2-4 (Blenheim)
2015-16	40	12	22	1	5	136	196	30	8th GLJHL	Lost quarters 0-4 (Essex)
Petrolia Flyers
2016-17	40	7	33	0	-	108	212	14	8th Stobbs	Lost Div. Quarters 0-4 (Lakeshore)
2017-18	40	19	18	0	3	147	140	41	6th Stobbs	Lost Div. Quarters 0-4 (73's)
2018-19	40	10	25	0	5	92	168	25	8th of 9 Stobbs	Lost Div. Quarters 0-4 (73's)
2019-20	40	14	22	1	3	95	146	32	6th of 9 Stobbs	Lost Div. Quarters 3-4 (Admirals)
2020-21	Season Lost due to COVID-19 pandemic									
2021-22	32	6	21	2	3	82	153	17	7th of 9 Stobbs	Lost Div. Quarters, 0-4 (73's)
2022-23	40	10	26	1	3	82	158	24	8th of 9 Yeck	Lost Div. Quarters 0-4 (Bulldogs)
2023-24	40	15	20	2	3	122	148	35	6th of 8 Yeck	Lost Div. Quarters 0-4 (Stars)
2024-25	42	28	11	3	1	190	139	59	1st of 8 Yeck; 3rd of 16 West Conf; 17th of 63 - PJHL	Won Div. Quarters 4-0 (Irish); Won Div. Semis 4-2 (Bulldogs); Won Div Final 4-2 (Hawks); Lost West Conference final 0-4 (73's)
2025-26	42	24	131	4	1	206	159	53	4 of 8 Yeck; 7th of 16 West Conf; 26th of 61 - PJHL	Lost Div. Quarters 1-4 (Bulldogs)
