= CBU Capers men's ice hockey =

Canadian college ice hockey team

- University: Cape Breton University
- Arena: Sydney, Nova Scotia
- Colors: Orange, Green, and White

Conference tournament champions
- 1974, 1975, 1976, 1977, 1978, 1980, 1981, 1982, 1983, 1984, 1985, 1986, 1987

The CBU Capers men's ice hockey team (formerly the UCCB Capers) was an ice hockey team representing the CBU Capers athletics program of Cape Breton University. The Capers played from 1968 until 1996 when the university decided to terminate the program due to budget constraints.

== History ==
UCCB hit the ice for the first time in 1968 as a member of the Atlantic Collegiate Athletic Association (ACAA), a conference in the Canadian Colleges Athletic Association, the second tier of college sports in Canada. By the mid-70s, the Capers became the dominant power in the conference and won every conference championship from 1974 until 1987 (except for 1979). When the CCAA began holding a national tournament in 1975, Cape Breton was a participant every year until 1987. Unfortunately for the Capers, the team had trouble making the championship. In thirteen appearances, UCCB made the finals just twice, winning the championship in 1978.

In 1987, UCCB became a victim of its own success. That year, the ACAA decided to end its sponsorship of ice hockey, leaving the Capers without a conference. Fortunately, the team was invited to join the Atlantic Universities Athletic Association (AUAA), the top-tier conference in the region. Cape Breton posted a few respectable seasons before recording their first winning season in 1991. Unfortunately, the Capers fell on hard times afterwards and finished last in their division in four of the succeeding five seasons. In 1996, Cape Breton University was at a crossroads; the ice hockey team was among the worst teams in the conference and required a great deal of financial resources from the school. The athletic department decided to reallocate the funding to support several other less-expensive programs, ending the hockey team.

== Season-by-season results ==
Note: GP = Games played, W = Wins, L = Losses, T = Ties, OTL = Overtime Losses, SOL = Shootout Losses, Pts = Points

| U Sports Champion | U Sports Semifinalist | Conference regular season champions | Conference Division Champions | Conference Playoff Champions |

| Season | Conference | Regular Season | | | | | | | | | | | | | Conference Tournament Results | National Tournament Results |
| Season | Conference | Conference | | | | | | | | Overall | | | | | Conference Tournament Results | National Tournament Results |
| Season | Conference | GP | W | L | T | OTL | SOL | Pts* | Finish | GP | W | L | T | % | Conference Tournament Results | National Tournament Results |
|---|---|---|---|---|---|---|---|---|---|---|---|---|---|---|---|---|
| 1968–69 | ACAA | ? | ? | ? | ? | ? | ? | ? | ? | ? | ? | ? | ? | ? | | |
| 1969–70 | ACAA | ? | ? | ? | ? | ? | ? | ? | ? | ? | ? | ? | ? | ? | | |
| 1970–71 | ACAA | ? | ? | ? | ? | ? | ? | ? | ? | ? | ? | ? | ? | ? | | |
| 1971–72 | ACAA | ? | ? | ? | ? | ? | ? | ? | ? | ? | ? | ? | ? | ? | | |
| 1972–73 | ACAA | ? | ? | ? | ? | ? | ? | ? | ? | ? | ? | ? | ? | ? | | |
| 1973–74 | ACAA | ? | ? | ? | ? | ? | ? | ? | ? | ? | ? | ? | ? | ? | Won Championship | |
| 1974–75 | ACAA | ? | ? | ? | ? | ? | ? | ? | ? | ? | ? | ? | ? | ? | Won Championship | Lost Semifinal, 3–7 (Camrose Lutheran); Won Consolation Game, 8–4 (Saint-Laurent) |
| 1975–76 | ACAA | ? | ? | ? | ? | ? | ? | ? | ? | ? | ? | ? | ? | ? | Won Championship | Lost Semifinal, 4–10 (St. Clair); Won Consolation Game, 11–3 (Lévis-Lauzon) |
| 1976–77 | ACAA | ? | ? | ? | ? | ? | ? | ? | ? | ? | ? | ? | ? | ? | Won Championship | Lost Semifinal, 3–4 (2OT) (Sheridan); Won Consolation Game, 8–5 (St. Clair) |
| 1977–78 | ACAA | ? | ? | ? | ? | ? | ? | ? | ? | ? | ? | ? | ? | ? | Won Championship | Won Quarterfinal, 9–5 (André-Laurendeau); Won Semifinal, 7–6 (Humber); Won Championship, 5–4 (Red Deer) |
| 1978–79 | ACAA | ? | ? | ? | ? | ? | ? | ? | ? | ? | ? | ? | ? | ? | | Lost Semifinal, 4–5 (Red Deer); Lost Bronze Medal Game, 5–9 (St. Clair) |
| 1979–80 | ACAA | ? | ? | ? | ? | ? | ? | ? | ? | ? | ? | ? | ? | ? | Won Championship | Lost Semifinal, 2–12 (Red Deer); Lost Consolation Semifinal, 6–7 (2OT) (Briercrest) |
| 1980–81 | ACAA | ? | ? | ? | ? | ? | ? | ? | ? | ? | ? | ? | ? | ? | Won Championship | Won Regional Final, 6–4 (Limoilou); Won National Semifinal, 8–5 (Humber); Lost Championship, 4–7 (SAIT) |
| 1981–82 | ACAA | ? | ? | ? | ? | ? | ? | ? | ? | ? | ? | ? | ? | ? | Won Championship | Lost Regional Final series, 0–2 (Limoilou) |
| 1982–83 | ACAA | ? | ? | ? | ? | ? | ? | ? | ? | ? | ? | ? | ? | ? | Won Championship | Won Quarterfinal, 4–2 (Canadore); Lost Semifinal, 0–5 (Red Deer); Won Consolation Semifinal, ? (Assiniboine); Won Bronze Medal Game, 8–2 (Canadore) |
| 1983–84 | ACAA | ? | ? | ? | ? | ? | ? | ? | ? | ? | ? | ? | ? | ? | Won Championship | Won Quarterfinal, 11–6 (Red River); Lost Semifinal, 2–8 (Saint-Hyacinthe); Lost Consolation Semifinal, 2–10 (Seneca) |
| 1984–85 | ACAA | ? | ? | ? | ? | ? | ? | ? | ? | ? | ? | ? | ? | ? | Won Championship | Won Quarterfinal, 12–7 (Red River); Lost Semifinal, 6–9 (Victoriaville); Lost Bronze Medal Game, 3–5 (Seneca) |
| 1985–86 | ACAA | ? | ? | ? | ? | ? | ? | ? | ? | ? | ? | ? | ? | ? | Won Championship | Lost Quarterfinal, 4–9 (Red River) |
| 1986–87 | ACAA | ? | ? | ? | ? | ? | ? | ? | ? | ? | ? | ? | ? | ? | Won Championship | Lost Round-Robin, 3–9 (Camrose Lutheran), 2–5 (Saint-Laurent); Lost Consolation Game, 6–7 (OT) (Kelsey) |
| 1987–88 | AUAA | 26 | 12 | 14 | 0 | – | – | 24 | 6th | 26 | 12 | 14 | 0 | .462 | | |
| 1988–89 | AUAA | 26 | 9 | 17 | 0 | – | – | 35 | 7th | 29 | 10 | 19 | 0 | .345 | Lost Quarterfinal series, 1–2 (Acadia) | |
| 1989–90 | AUAA | 21 | 7 | 14 | 0 | – | – | 14 | 8th | 24 | 8 | 16 | 0 | .333 | Lost Quarterfinal series, 1–2 (Acadia) | |
| 1990–91 | AUAA | 26 | 14 | 12 | 0 | – | – | 28 | 3rd | 30 | 16 | 14 | 0 | .533 | Won Quarterfinal series, 2–0 (Acadia); Lost Semifinal series, 0–2 (Dalhousie) | |
| 1991–92 | AUAA | 26 | 7 | 15 | 4 | – | – | 18 | 9th | 26 | 7 | 15 | 4 | .346 | | |
| 1992–93 | AUAA | 26 | 10 | 15 | 1 | – | – | 21 | 7th | 29 | 11 | 17 | 1 | .397 | Lost Quarterfinal series, 1–2 (Acadia) | |
| 1993–94 | AUAA | 26 | 5 | 18 | 3 | – | – | 13 | 9th | 26 | 5 | 18 | 3 | .250 | | |
| 1994–95 | AUAA | 26 | 1 | 24 | 1 | – | – | 3 | 10th | 26 | 1 | 24 | 1 | .058 | | |
| 1995–96 | AUAA | 26 | 2 | 23 | 1 | – | – | 5 | 10th | 26 | 2 | 23 | 1 | .096 | | |
| Totals | | | | | | | | | | GP | W | L | T/SOL | % | Championships | |
| Regular Season | | | | | | | | | | 229 | 67 | 152 | 10 | .314 | | |
| Conference Post-season | | | | | | | | | | 13 | 5 | 8 | 0 | .385 | 13 ACAA Championships | |
| U Sports Postseason | | | | | | | | | | 0 | 0 | 0 | 0 | – | 13 CCAA Tournament appearances | |
| Regular Season and Postseason Record | | | | | | | | | | 242 | 72 | 160 | 10 | .318 | 1 CCAA National Championship | |

Note: Totals include results from 1987–88 onward.
