= Mohawk Mountaineers men's ice hockey =

- University: Mohawk College
- Arena: Hamilton, Ontario
- Colors: Burgundy, Crimson, and Orange

The Mohawk Mountaineers men's ice hockey team was an ice hockey team representing the Mohawk College. The team was active in the 1960s and 70s, being founded prior to the establishment of Mohawk College.

== History ==
Hamilton Tech began sponsoring ice hockey as a varsity sport in 1960 when they helped found the Ontario Training College Conference. Two years later, Hamilton Tech and Western Ontario Tech left to join the Ontario Intercollegiate Athletic Association as that conference was seeking to promote itself to the senior level of Canadian college hockey. It took two years for the OIAA to gain the recognition it was seeking and Hamilton played its first season of tier-1 hockey in 1964–65. Unfortunately for the team, that was the same year that Bill Davis, as Ministry of Education, submitted Bill 153 to establish twenty new colleges throughout Ontario.

Hamilton Tech continued on while the changes were being finalized and its team remained an official member of the OIAA. However, they only played exhibition games afterwards. In 1967, the college was closed and its remnants were used to establish Mohawk College. The newly rechristened Mohawk Mountaineers left the OIAA and returned to the Intermediate level. The program joined the Ontario Colleges Athletic Association, an expansive conference of many small colleges from Southern Ontario. In their first full season of conference play, 1968–69, the program produced its first winning season. After two relatively poor seasons, Mohawk returned to the postseason, losing in the quarterfinals. References to the varsity team cease after 1973 and the team has not resurfaced (as of 2024).

== Season-by-season results ==
=== Intermediate level ===
Note: GP = Games played, W = Wins, L = Losses, T = Ties, OTL = Overtime Losses, SOL = Shootout Losses, Pts = Points

U Sports Champion	U Sports Semifinalist	Conference regular season champions	Conference Division Champions	Conference Playoff Champions

Season	Conference	Regular Season													Conference Tournament Results	National Tournament Results
Season	Conference	Conference								Overall					Conference Tournament Results	National Tournament Results
Season	Conference	GP	W	L	T	OTL	SOL	Pts*	Finish	GP	W	L	T	%	Conference Tournament Results	National Tournament Results
1960–61	OTCC	?	?	?	?	?	?	?	?	?	?	?	?	?		
1961–62	OTCC	?	?	?	?	?	?	?	?	?	?	?	?	?		
1962–63	OIAA	?	?	?	?	?	?	?	?	?	?	?	?	?		
1963–64	OIAA	?	?	?	?	?	?	?	N/A ^{†}	?	?	?	?	?		
Promoted to senior hockey
1967–68	OCAA	?	?	?	?	?	?	?	N/A ^{†}	?	?	?	?	?		
1968–69	OCAA	10	5	3	2	—	—	12	?	?	?	?	?	?		
1969–70	OCAA	?	?	?	?	?	?	?	?	?	?	?	?	?	Lost Semifinal, 1–2 (St. Clair); Lost Consolation Game, 3–9 (Cambrian)	
1970–71	OCAA	13	5	7	1	—	—	11	12th	?	?	?	?	?		
1972–73	OCAA	18	14	4	0	—	—	28	?	?	?	?	?	?	Lost Quarterfinal, 5–8 (Seneca)	
program suspended
Totals										GP	W	L	T/SOL	%	Championships	
Regular Season										—	—	—	—	—		
Conference Post-season										—	—	—	—	—		
U Sports Postseason										—	—	—	—	—		
Regular Season and Postseason Record										—	—	—	—	—		

† season ended early when the league cancelled its remaining schedule in protest.

=== Senior level ===
Note: GP = Games played, W = Wins, L = Losses, T = Ties, OTL = Overtime Losses, SOL = Shootout Losses, Pts = Points

U Sports Champion	U Sports Semifinalist	Conference regular season champions	Conference Division Champions	Conference Playoff Champions

Season	Conference	Regular Season													Conference Tournament Results	National Tournament Results
Season	Conference	Conference								Overall					Conference Tournament Results	National Tournament Results
Season	Conference	GP	W	L	T	OTL	SOL	Pts*	Finish	GP	W	L	T	%	Conference Tournament Results	National Tournament Results
1964–65	OIAA	6	0	6	0	–	–	0	T–7th	6	0	6	0	.000		
1965–66	OIAA	0	0	0	0	–	–	0	N/A ^{‡}	0	0	0	0	–		
1966–67	OIAA	0	0	0	0	–	–	0	N/A ^{‡}	0	0	0	0	–		
returned to Intermediate level
Totals										GP	W	L	T/SOL	%	Championships	
Regular Season										6	0	6	0	.000		
Conference Post-season										0	0	0	0	–		
U Sports Postseason										0	0	0	0	–		
Regular Season and Postseason Record										6	0	6	0	.000		

‡ played only exhibition games. Note: Totals include senior collegiate play only.
