= List of NHL players who have signed offer sheets =

This is a list of National Hockey League players who have signed offer sheets.

In the NHL, players who are restricted free agents can be, after being qualified by their current team, signed by another team to an offer sheet with salary greater than the qualifying offer. Teams have seven days to match the offer, and if the offer is not matched, the team making the offer sheet must give up compensation (see here for details). Currently to be tendered an offer sheet, a player must qualify as a Group 2 Restricted Free Agent (Group 2 RFA). To be considered a Group 2 RFA, a player must:

1. Reach the required number of professional seasons depending on the age of the player when he first signs his Standard Player Contract. (3 professional seasons for ages 18-21, 2 professional seasons for ages 22-23, and 1 professional season for ages 23 and older)
2. Have at least one NHL contract expire.
3. Be without a contract for the upcoming season.
4. Be tendered a qualifying offer by the current team by June 25 or the Monday after that year's NHL entry draft (whichever is later)

If any of those conditions has not been met, the player will not become a Group 2 RFA.

== 1988–1994 Restricted free agent classification ==
The 1988–1994 NHL collective bargaining agreement (CBA) introduced restricted free agency and operated under different rules than subsequent CBAs. Unrestricted free agency would not be introduced until the 1995 CBA. The 1988–1994 NHL CBA had four groups of restricted free agents who were eligible to sign an offer sheet. Since 1995, Group II restricted free agency was the lone carryover with adjusted age and experience criteria.

| Classification | | Compensation |
|---|---|---|
| Group I | Under 25 years old with less than five years of pro experience | Original team was not permitted to match the offer sheet. Teams were given a week to complete the equalization process in which the original team would be compensated with current NHL players, prospects, and/or draft picks. If an agreement could not be reached, the two teams would present their offers before an arbitrator who would choose between the two. |
| Group II | Between the ages of 25 and 31 (later amended to 30) | Original team was permitted to match the offer sheet. The original team was given a week to decide whether to match. The CBA set a predefined amount of draft pick compensation linked to the dollar amount of the offer sheet. |
| Group III | 31 years or older (later amended to 30) | The player could specify whether his original team could match. If the player did not allow the original team to match, his new club would begin the equalization process with his original team. If given the option to match, a team received no compensation if it declined. |
| Group IV | European draft pick who remained unsigned after two years from being drafted | Original team was permitted to match the offer sheet. The original team received no compensation if they did not match. |

== Signed offer sheets ==
| Player | Date | Offer Amount | Original Team | Offer Team | Result | Compensation |
|---|---|---|---|---|---|---|
| Gary Nylund | August 1986 | 3 years plus option, ~$620 000 | Toronto Maple Leafs | Chicago Blackhawks | Not Matched | Ken Yaremchuk, Jerome Dupont, 4th round draft in 1987 |
| Geoff Courtnall | August 1988 | unknown | Edmonton Oilers | New York Rangers | Matched | The Washington Capitals matched the New York Rangers's offer after the Oilers traded their right to match to Washington for Greg Adams. |
| Guy Lafleur | July 15, 1989 | undisclosed | New York Rangers | Quebec Nordiques | Not Matched | Group III offer sheet. Quebec agreed to send $100,000 and a 5th round pick in the 1990 Draft in exchange for the Rangers declining their option to match. |
| Larry Robinson | July 25, 1989 | 3 years, 1.6 million | Montreal Canadiens | Los Angeles Kings | Not Matched | Group III offer sheet, Montreal received no compensation due to having option of matching offer sheet. |
| Scott Stevens | July 16, 1990 | 4 years, $5.1 million | Washington Capitals | St. Louis Blues | Not Matched | Five 1st round draft picks |
| Dave Christian | July 21, 1991 | 3 years, $1.775 million | Boston Bruins | St. Louis Blues | Dropped | – |
| Glen Featherstone | July 25, 1991 | 2 years, ~$500 000 | St. Louis Blues | Boston Bruins | Not Matched | Dave Christian, a 3rd round pick in 1992, and seventh in 1992 or sixth in 1993 (plus Tomlinson) |
| Dave Thomlinson | July 25, 1991 | $200 000 | St. Louis Blues | Boston Bruins | Not Matched | Part of Featherstone accepted compensation. |
| Brendan Shanahan | July 25, 1991 | 3 years, $3.015 million | New Jersey Devils | St. Louis Blues | Group I – not allowed to match | Scott Stevens awarded as compensation. During the Group I equalization process, the Blues offered G Curtis Joseph, C Rod Brind'Amour and two draft picks, but the Devils declined, asking instead for Stevens. The case was referred to arbitration, and arbitrator Edward Houston awarded Stevens to the Devils.) |
| Michel Goulet | July 1991 | 4 years, $2.9 million (three years plus option year) | Chicago Blackhawks | St. Louis Blues | Matched | – |
| Troy Crowder | August 27, 1991 | undisclosed | New Jersey Devils | Detroit Red Wings | Group I – not allowed to match | Dave Barr and Randy McKay awarded as compensation by arbitrator. New Jersey had requested Bob Probert. |
| Adam Graves | Sept 3, 1991 | 5 years, $2.44 million | Edmonton Oilers | New York Rangers | Group I – not allowed to match | Troy Mallette was given to Edmonton as compensation for the Group I offer sheet as per arbitrator's ruling. Edmonton had requested Steven Rice and Louie DeBrusk. |
| Kevin Stevens | Sept 25, 1991 | 5 years, $5.375 million | Pittsburgh Penguins | Boston Bruins | Matched | – |
| Dave Manson | June 26, 1992 | 3 years, $3.4 million, third year optional at $1.2 million | Edmonton Oilers | Washington Capitals | Matched | – |
| Sergei Makarov | July 28, 1992 | 4 years, 2 million | Calgary Flames | San Jose Sharks | Matched | Group III offer sheet, Calgary would not have received compensation had they declined to match. |
| Teemu Selanne | 1992 | $2.7 million | Winnipeg Jets | Calgary Flames | Matched | Group IV offer sheet for unsigned European draft pick |
| Craig Simpson | July 16, 1993 | 3 years, $3.09 million | Edmonton Oilers | San Jose Sharks | Invalidated | The San Jose Sharks had structured Simpson's offer sheet so that most of the money was a signing bonus; Simpson's first year salary would have been less than $200,000 as a result. Earlier in the offseason, Simpson had rejected an offer from Edmonton of $690,000 because it was below the 15 percent raise required to keep him restricted. After the Sharks deal was rejected, Simpson then sought to sign an offer sheet from the Buffalo Sabres, but Edmonton would trade him there before he could do so. |
| Kelly Miller | July 18, 1993 | 2 years, $2.65 million | Washington Capitals | San Jose Sharks | Matched | – |
| Marty McSorley | August, 1993 | 5 years, $10 million | Los Angeles Kings | St. Louis Blues | Matched | Group III offer sheet. Kings matched and immediately traded McSorley to Pittsburgh for Shawn McEachern |
| Petr Nedved | March 4, 1994 | 3 years, $12 million | Vancouver Canucks | St. Louis Blues | Group I – not allowed to match | Group I offer sheet. During equalization process, Vancouver requested Brendan Shanahan but arbitrator chose St. Louis' offer of Craig Janney + 2nd round draft pick- After Janney refused to report, Vancouver dealt him back to the Blues for Jeff Brown, Bret Hedican and Nathan Lafayette. |
| Scott Stevens | July 4, 1994 | 4 years, $17 million | New Jersey Devils | St. Louis Blues | Matched | Blues ordered to compensate Devils $1.425 million + 1st round draft pick for tampering. Stevens' second career offer sheet. |
| Mike Craig | July 29, 1994 | 4 years, $2.4 million | Dallas Stars | Toronto Maple Leafs | Not Matched | Peter Zezel and Grant Marshall |
| Steven Rice | August 30, 1994 | $1.7 million | Edmonton Oilers | Hartford Whalers | Not Matched | Bryan Marchment; the Whalers originally offered the Oilers forward Robert Kron as compensation, but an arbitrator ruled in favour of the Oilers, who argued that Marchment represented fairer compensation for the loss of Rice. |
| Shayne Corson | July 28, 1995 | 5 year, $6.975 million | Edmonton Oilers | St. Louis Blues | Not Matched | First round picks in 1996 and 1997; Traded back to St. Louis for Curtis Joseph and Mike Grier |
| Stu Grimson | August 17, 1995 | 5 year, $2.5 million | Detroit Red Wings | New York Rangers | Matched | – |
| Keith Tkachuk | 1995 | 5 years, $17.2 million | Winnipeg Jets | Chicago Blackhawks | Matched | – |
| Ron Tugnutt | July 10, 1996 | < $400 000/year | Washington Capitals | Ottawa Senators | Not Matched | No compensation due to contract value |
| Arturs Irbe | July 22, 1996 | 1 year, $400 000 plus incentives | San Jose Sharks | Dallas Stars | Not Matched | No compensation due to contract value |
| Joe Sakic | 1997 | 3 years, $21 million | Colorado Avalanche | New York Rangers | Matched | – |
| Chris Gratton | 1997 | 5 years, $16.5 million | Tampa Bay Lightning | Philadelphia Flyers | Not Matched | Compensation was set as four 1st round picks, which were traded back to the Flyers for Mikael Renberg and Karl Dykhuis with Flyers picking up part of Renberg's salary. |
| Mattias Ohlund | 1997 | 5 years, $10 million & $7.5 million signing bonus | Vancouver Canucks | Toronto Maple Leafs | Matched. | As a 1994 draft pick, Ohlund was grandfathered to the previous CBA which allowed him to sign the Group IV offer sheet that had been removed in the 1995 CBA. |
| Sergei Fedorov | Feb 1998 | 6 year, $38 million | Detroit Red Wings | Carolina Hurricanes | Matched | In an attempt to dissuade the Red Wings from matching, Carolina's contract was unusually front-loaded, and included a $12 million bonus if Fedorov reached the conference final, a far greater likelihood with the perennially contending Red Wings than the struggling Hurricanes. Detroit did match the offer sheet and Fedorov was paid $28 million for the season. |
| Ryan Kesler | Sept 12, 2006 | 1 year, $1.9 million | Vancouver Canucks | Philadelphia Flyers | Matched | – |
| Thomas Vanek | July 6, 2007 | 7 years, $50 million | Buffalo Sabres | Edmonton Oilers | Matched | – |
| Dustin Penner | July 26, 2007 | 5 years, $21.5 million | Anaheim Ducks | Edmonton Oilers | Not Matched | 1st, 2nd, and 3rd round picks in 2008 |
| David Backes | July 1, 2008 | 3 years, $7.5 million | St. Louis Blues | Vancouver Canucks | Matched | – |
| Steve Bernier | July 8, 2008 | 1 year, $2.5 million | Vancouver Canucks | St. Louis Blues | Matched | – |
| Niklas Hjalmarsson | July 9, 2010 | 4 years, $14 million | Chicago Blackhawks | San Jose Sharks | Matched | – |
| Shea Weber | July 18, 2012 | 14 years, $110 million | Nashville Predators | Philadelphia Flyers | Matched | – |
| Ryan O'Reilly | February 28, 2013 | 2 years, $10 million | Colorado Avalanche | Calgary Flames | Matched | – |
| Sebastian Aho | July 1, 2019 | 5 years, $42.27 million | Carolina Hurricanes | Montreal Canadiens | Matched | – |
| Jesperi Kotkaniemi | August 28, 2021 | 1 year, $6.1 million | Montreal Canadiens | Carolina Hurricanes | Not matched | 1st and 3rd round picks in 2022. The offer sheet was widely seen as a revenge for the Canadiens offer sheet of Sebastian Aho two years prior, although Hurricanes GM Don Waddell denied this. Kotkaniemi's signing bonus for the contract was $20, a reference to Aho's jersey number. |
| Philip Broberg | August 13, 2024 | 2 years, $9.16 million | Edmonton Oilers | St. Louis Blues | Not matched | 2nd round pick in 2025 |
| Dylan Holloway | August 13, 2024 | 2 years, $4.58 million | Edmonton Oilers | St. Louis Blues | Not matched | 3rd round pick in 2025 |
| Barrett Hayton | July 1, 2026 | 1 year, $4.775 million | Utah Mammoth | New Jersey Devils | Matched | |
| Leo Carlsson | July 3, 2026 | 5 years, $90 million | Anaheim Ducks | Philadelphia Flyers | Matched | At the time it was signed, the contract made Carlsson the highest-paid player per year in NHL history, at $18 million annual average value (AAV). |

== Related transactions ==
In August 1994, the Hartford Whalers reportedly wished to sign Glen Wesley to an offer sheet, however they already had an outstanding offer for Steven Rice at the time. Instead, Wesley was signed by the Boston Bruins and immediately traded for three 1st round draft picks in the 1995, 1996, and 1997 drafts. The contract was reported to be $1.7 million per season for 3 seasons.
