= TD Civic Centre =

Arena in Ontario

Coordinates: 43°8′7″N 80°15′54″W

- "The Madhouse on Market Street"
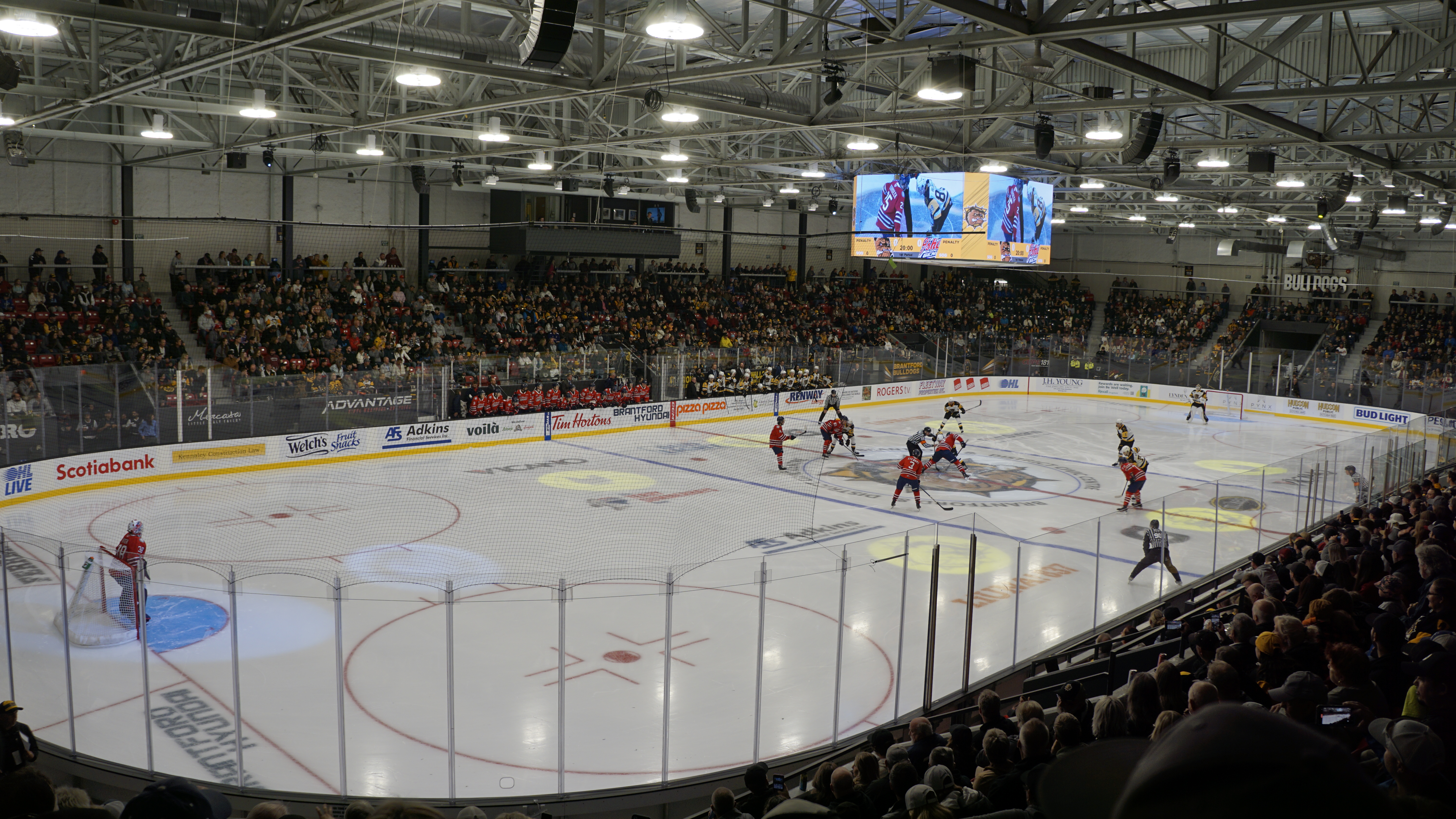
- The Brantford Bulldogs playing the Oshawa Generals in their home opener for the 2023-2024 OHL season.
- Interactive map of TD Civic Centre
- Former names: Brantford and District Civic Centre (1967–2025)
- Location: 79 Market Street South; Brantford, Ontario; N3S 2E4
- Seating type: Bowl
- Capacity: 2,981 (1967–2015); 2,952 (2015–2023) Present 2,952 seated (3,207) including standing room
- Surface: 190' X 85'
- Record attendance: November 2, 2024 vs Sudbury Wolves 3,207

Construction
- Built: 1967
- Renovated: 2015, 2023

Tenants
- Brantford Alexanders Brantford Smoke Brantford Blast Brantford Eagles Brantford Bandits Brantford Bulldogs: 1978–1984; 1991–1998; 2000–present 2002–2011; 2019–2023; 2023–present

Website
- https://www.brantford.ca/en/things-to-do/brantford-and-district-civic-centre.aspx

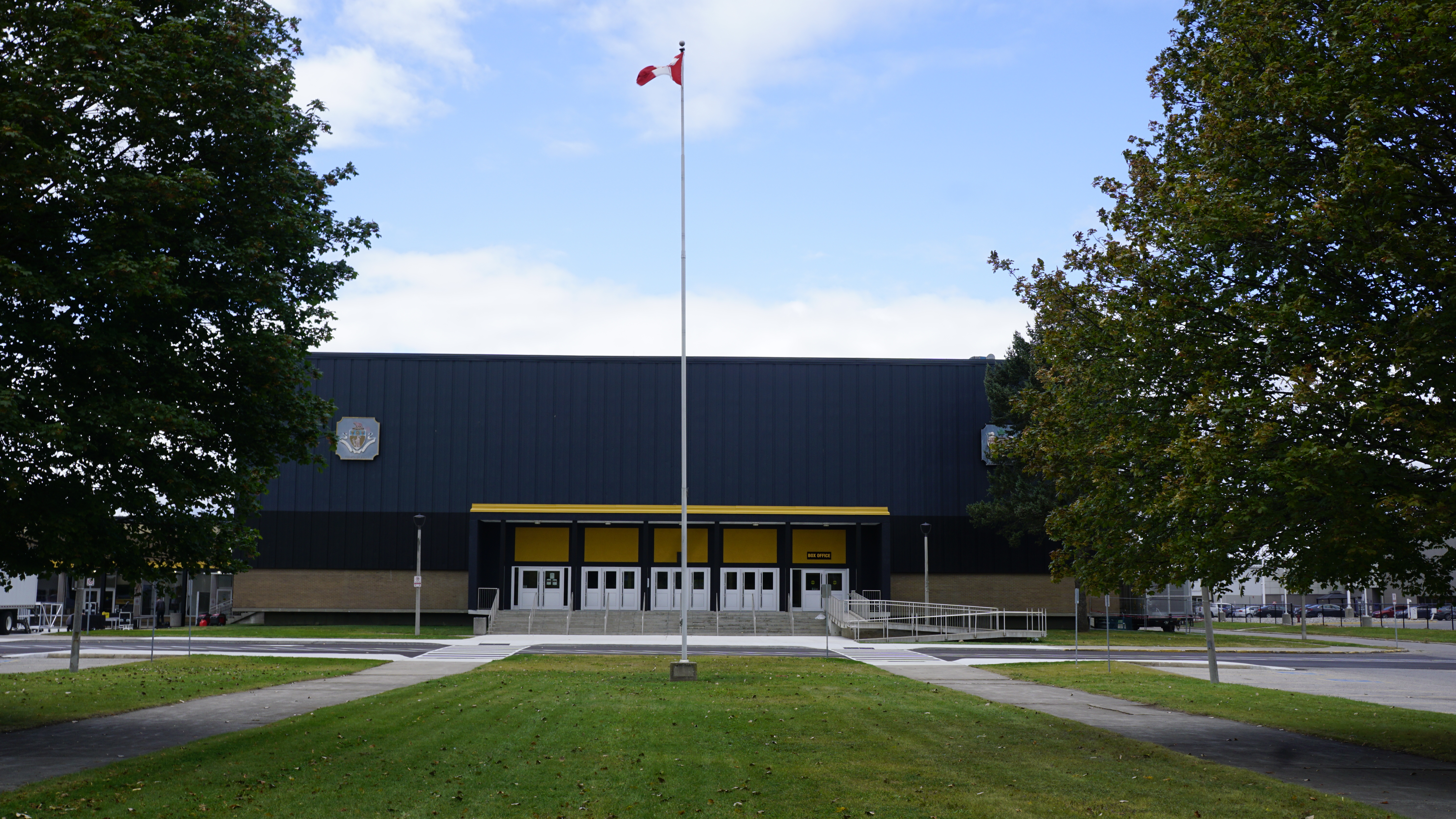
Exterior

The TD Civic Centre (Formerly known as the Brantford and District Civic Centre and more commonly known as simply the Brantford Civic Centre) is a 2,952-seat arena in Brantford, Ontario, Canada. It was built as a Canadian Centennial project in 1967. The Civic Centre is located in the downtown core, adjacent to Elements Casino Brantford. It is currently home to the Brantford Bulldogs of the Ontario Hockey League.

== History ==
The Pittsburgh Penguins used the arena for preseason camp and exhibition games in September, 1967. Previously, the arena hosted the Brantford Alexanders of the Ontario Hockey League from 1978–1984, and the OHL All-Star game in 1982. The Brantford Smoke of the Colonial Hockey League played there from 1991 to 1998. It was the former home to the Brantford Golden Eagles of the Ontario Hockey Association, and was the home to the Brantford Blast of Allan Cup Hockey.

The 2008 Allan Cup was played there from April 14–19, which saw the Blast win the 100th Allan Cup, beating the Bentley Generals 3–1.

In 2015, the building underwent a $400,000 renovation to replace the original wooden seats, and make the building handicap accessible. The seating capacity was reduced from 2,981 to 2,952 as a result.

In February 2023, due to upcoming renovations to the FirstOntario Centre, the Hamilton Bulldogs announced they would be temporarily relocating to the Civic Centre and renaming as the Brantford Bulldogs for at least three seasons, beginning in the 2023-24 OHL season. The Civic Centre will also be undergoing over $9 million in renovations, funded by both the Bulldogs and the City of Brantford.

In September 2025, the arena was renamed to the TD Civic Centre after Toronto-Dominion Bank (TD) bought the naming rights.

== Other events ==
It also served as a venue for live WWE events throughout the 1980s and early 1990s, including Maple Leaf Wrestling television shows on Hamilton station CHCH-TV.
