= St. Clair Saints men's ice hockey =

- University: St. Clair College
- Arena: Windsor, Ontario
- Colors: Green and Gold

Conference Tournament championships
- 1969, 1970, 1973, 1975, 1976, 1977, 1979

Conference regular season championships
- 1968, 1969, 1970, 1972, 1976, 1978, 1979, 1980

The St. Clair Saints men's ice hockey team was an ice hockey team representing the St. Clair College. The team was active from the foundation of the college in 1967 until 1986.

== History ==
Shortly after the founding of the Western Ontario Institute of Technology (WOIT) in 1958, the college began sponsoring ice hockey as a varsity sport. The team helped found the Ontario Training College Conference along with three other small colleges in Southern Ontario. In 1962, Western Ontario Tech left to join the Ontario Intercollegiate Athletic Association as that conference was seeking to promote itself to the senior level of Canadian college hockey. Two years later, the OIAA was invited to participate in the University Cup for the first time.

That May Bill Davis, the Ontario Ministry of Education, submitted Bill 153 to establish twenty new colleges throughout Ontario. Part of the plan included amalgamating small, existing schools into larger institutions and WOIT was one of the colleges selected for that task. Tech continued on for the next two seasons while plans were being finalized and made its last appearance during the 1966–67 season.

WOIT was combined with the Colleges of Applied Arts and Technology to form St. Clair College in 1967. The school iced a hockey team from the start and were members of the Ontario Colleges Athletic Association (OCAA), an Intermediate league. The Saints swiftly became one of the dominant teams in the league, winning eight conference championships over a twelve-year span and the national intermediate championship in 1976. However, in the 1980s, the team slumped and produced as losing seasons as winning ones. The program was suspended in 1986.

At the dawn of the 21st century, students from St. Clair began playing senior hockey under the banner of the Windsor St. Clair Saints.

== Season-by-season results ==
Championship banners (click to enlarge).

Note: GP = Games played, W = Wins, L = Losses, T = Ties, OTL = Overtime Losses, SOL = Shootout Losses, Pts = Points

U Sports Champion	U Sports Semi-finalist	Conference regular season champions	Conference Division Champions	Conference Playoff Champions

Season	Conference	Regular Season													Conference Tournament Results	National Tournament Results
Season	Conference	Conference								Overall					Conference Tournament Results	National Tournament Results
Season	Conference	GP	W	L	T	OTL	SOL	Pts*	Finish	GP	W	L	T	%	Conference Tournament Results	National Tournament Results
1960–61	OTCC	?	?	?	?	?	?	?	?	?	?	?	?	?		
1961–62	OTCC	?	?	?	?	?	?	?	?	?	?	?	?	?		
1962–63	OIAA	?	?	?	?	?	?	?	?	?	?	?	?	?		
1963–64	OIAA	?	?	?	?	?	?	?	N/A ^{†}	?	?	?	?	?		
Promoted to senior hockey
1964–65	OIAA	6	3	3	0	–	–	0	T–4th	6	3	3	0	.500		
1965–66	OIAA	?	?	?	?	?	?	?	?	?	?	?	?	?		
1966–67	OIAA	12	3	8	1	–	–	7	5th	12	3	8	1	.292		
WOIT amalgamated into St. Clair College
Returned to intermediate level
1967–68	OCAA	12	10	0	2	—	—	22	1st	?	?	?	?	?		
1968–69	OCAA	10	9	0	1	—	—	19	1st	?	?	?	?	?	Won Semi-final, 5–4 (Centennial); Won Championship, 5–4 (OT) (Algonquin)	
1969–70	OCAA	10	9	0	1	—	—	19	1st	?	?	?	?	?	Won Semi-final, 8–3 (Cambrian); Won Championship, 5–2 (Algonquin)	
1970–71	OCAA	13	8	4	1	—	—	17	T–4th	?	?	?	?	?		
1971–72	OCAA	20	18	2	0	—	—	36	1st	?	?	?	?	?	Won Quarterfinal, 4–2 (St. Lawrence–Cornwall); Won Semi-final, 4–2 (Northern–Kirkland Lake); Lost Championship, 1–7 (Seneca)	
1972–73	OCAA	17	14	3	0	—	—	28	3rd	?	?	?	?	?	Won Quarterfinal, 5–2 (Canadore); Won Semi-final, 10–6 (Algonquin); Won Championship, 7–1 (Seneca)	
1973–74	OCAA	18	14	4	0	—	—	28	?	?	?	?	?	?	Won Semi-final, 9–5 (Algonquin); Lost Championship, 2–6 (Sheridan)	
1974–75	OCAA	19	17	2	0	—	—	34	2nd	?	?	?	?	?	Won Semi-final, 9–4 (Algonquin); Won Championship, 7–6 (Sheridan)	Won Semi-final, 5–1 (Saint-Laurent); Lost Championship, 2–6 (Camrose Lutheran)
1975–76	OCAA	20	20	0	0	—	—	40	1st	?	?	?	?	?	Won Semi-final, 8–2 (Algonquin); Won Championship, 11–2 (Humber)	Won Semi-final, 10–4 (Cape Breton); Won Championship, 11–2 (Selkirk)
1976–77	OCAA	17	13	1	3	—	—	29	2nd	?	?	?	?	?	Won Semi-final series, 2–0 (Canadore); Won Championship series, 2–0 (Sheridan)	Lost Semi-final, 2–6 (Red Deer); Won Bronze Medal Game, 11–2 (Cape Breton)
1977–78	OCAA	20	17	3	0	—	—	34	1st	?	?	?	?	?	Won Semi-final series, 2–0 (Algonquin); Lost Championship, 0–2 (Humber)	
1978–79	OCAA	18	15	3	0	—	—	30	1st	?	?	?	?	?	Won Semi-final series, 2–0 (Seneca); Won Championship series, 2–0 (Humber)	Won Quarterfinal, 10–3 (Beauce-Appalaches); Lost Semi-final, 4–5 (OT) (SAIT); Won Bronze Medal Game, 9–5 (Cape Breton)
1979–80	OCAA	18	13	5	0	—	—	26	T–1st	?	?	?	?	?	Won Semi-final series, 2–0 (Canadore); Lost Championship series, 0–2 (Seneca)	
1980–81	OCAA	16	13	3	0	—	—	26	2nd	?	?	?	?	?	Won Quarterfinal series, 2–1 (Conestoga); Lost Semi-final Round-robin, 0–3–1 (Humber, Seneca)	
1981–82	OCAA	14	7	7	0	—	—	14	3rd	?	?	?	?	?	Lost Semi-final series, 1–2 (Centennial)	
1982–83	OCAA	24	11	13	0	—	—	22	5th	?	?	?	?	?		
1983–84	OCAA	24	13	10	1	—	—	27	T–2nd	?	?	?	?	?	Lost Semi-final series, 0–2 (Seneca)	
1984–85	OCAA	26	15	11	0	—	—	30	3rd	?	?	?	?	?	Lost First Round, 3–4 (Canadore)	
1985–86	OCAA	24	10	13	1	—	—	21	T–4th	?	?	?	?	?	Lost Semi-final series, 0–2 (Humber)	
program suspended
Totals										GP	W	L	T/SOL	%	Championships	
Regular Season										18	6	11	1	.361	8 OCAA Championships, 8 West Division Titles	
Conference Post-season										0	0	0	0	–	7 OCAA Championships	
U Sports Postseason										0	0	0	0	–	4 Championship Bowl appearances	
Regular Season and Postseason Record										18	6	11	1	.361	1 National Championship	

† season ended early when the league cancelled its remaining schedule in protest.
Note: Totals include senior collegiate play only.
