= Niklas Hjalmarsson =

Swedish ice hockey player (born 1987)

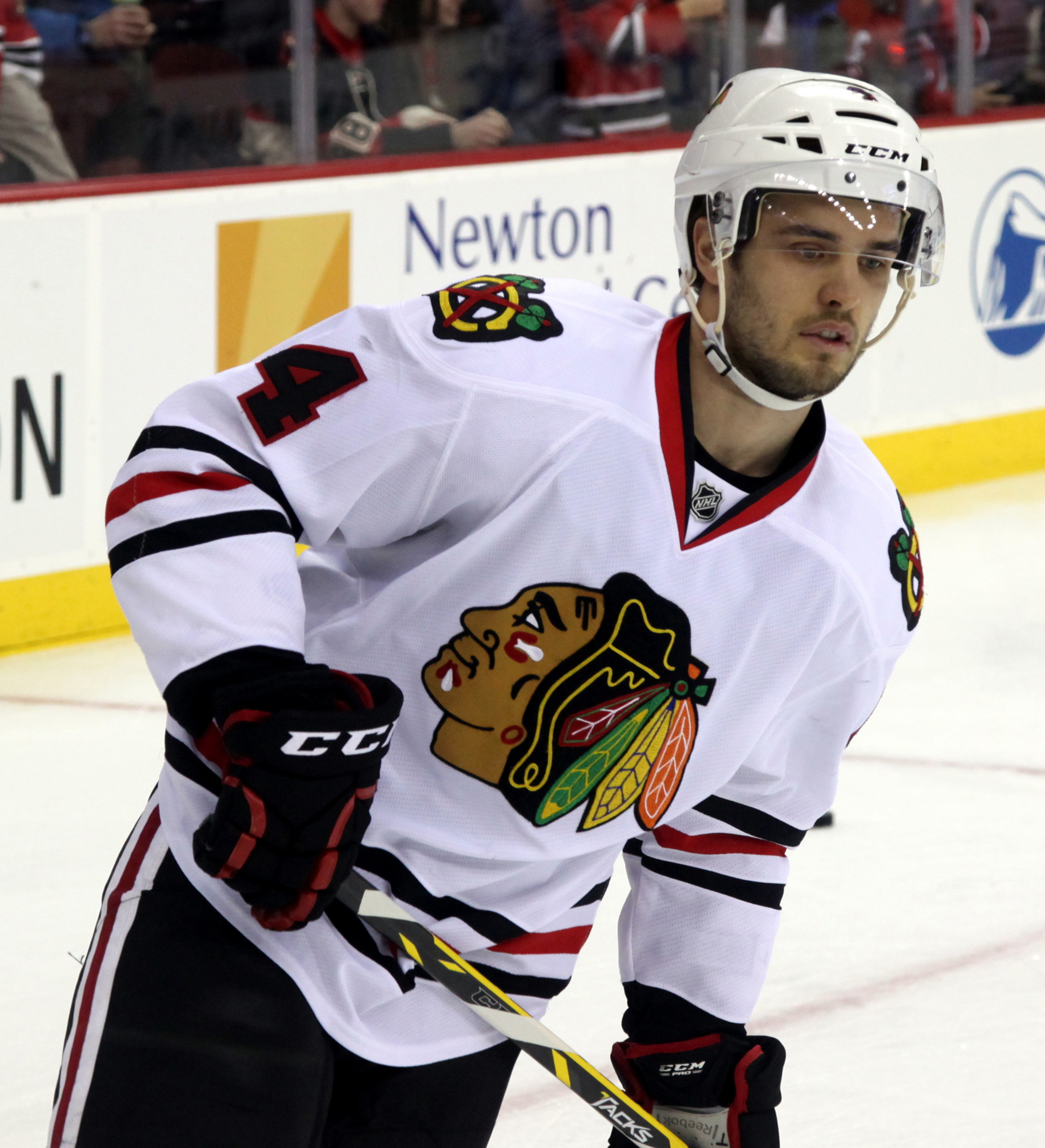
- Hjalmarsson with the Chicago Blackhawks in December 2014
- Born: 6 June 1987 (age 39) Eksjö, Sweden
- Height: 6 ft 3 in (191 cm)
- Weight: 197 lb (89 kg; 14 st 1 lb)
- Position: Defence
- Shot: Left
- Played for: HV71; Chicago Blackhawks; HC Bolzano; Arizona Coyotes
- National team: Sweden
- NHL draft: 108th overall, 2005; Chicago Blackhawks
- Playing career: 2004–2023

Niklas Hjalmarsson (born 6 June 1987) is a Swedish former professional ice hockey defenceman who last played for HV71 of the Swedish Hockey League (SHL).

He previously also played for the Chicago Blackhawks and Arizona Coyotes of the National Hockey League (NHL). Drafted in the fourth round (108th overall) by the Blackhawks in the 2005 NHL entry draft, Hjalmarsson won three Stanley Cups (2010, 2013, and 2015) as well as a silver Olympic medal with Sweden at the 2014 Winter Olympics.

== Playing career ==
=== Chicago Blackhawks ===
Hjalmarsson was drafted 108th overall in the 2005 NHL entry draft by the Chicago Blackhawks. He played professionally for three years in the Elitserien with HV71.

In the 2007–08 season, his first in North America, Hjalmarsson made his NHL debut with the Blackhawks. After spending the majority of the season with the Rockford IceHogs, Chicago's American Hockey League (AHL) affiliate, he procured a regular spot on the roster after defenceman James Wisniewski's trade to the Anaheim Ducks.

Hjalmarsson scored his first career NHL goal against Ty Conklin of the Detroit Red Wings.

Hjalmarsson became a key part of the Blackhawks' lineup late into the 2008–09 season and to begin the 2009–10 season. In 2009–10, he played 77 games in the regular season and all 22 in the Stanley Cup playoffs for the team, averaging over 19 minutes played per game, switching between the second and third defensive pairings. Over that time, he recorded a production value (PROD) of a point roughly every 45 minutes of it, while his season PROD was 89 minutes. During the 2010 Stanley Cup playoffs, a slapshot Hjalmarsson took was redirected by teammate Andrew Ladd to give Chicago a 3–2 lead in game six of the 2010 Stanley Cup Final; the team won the game in overtime, 4–3, and eventually the Stanley Cup.

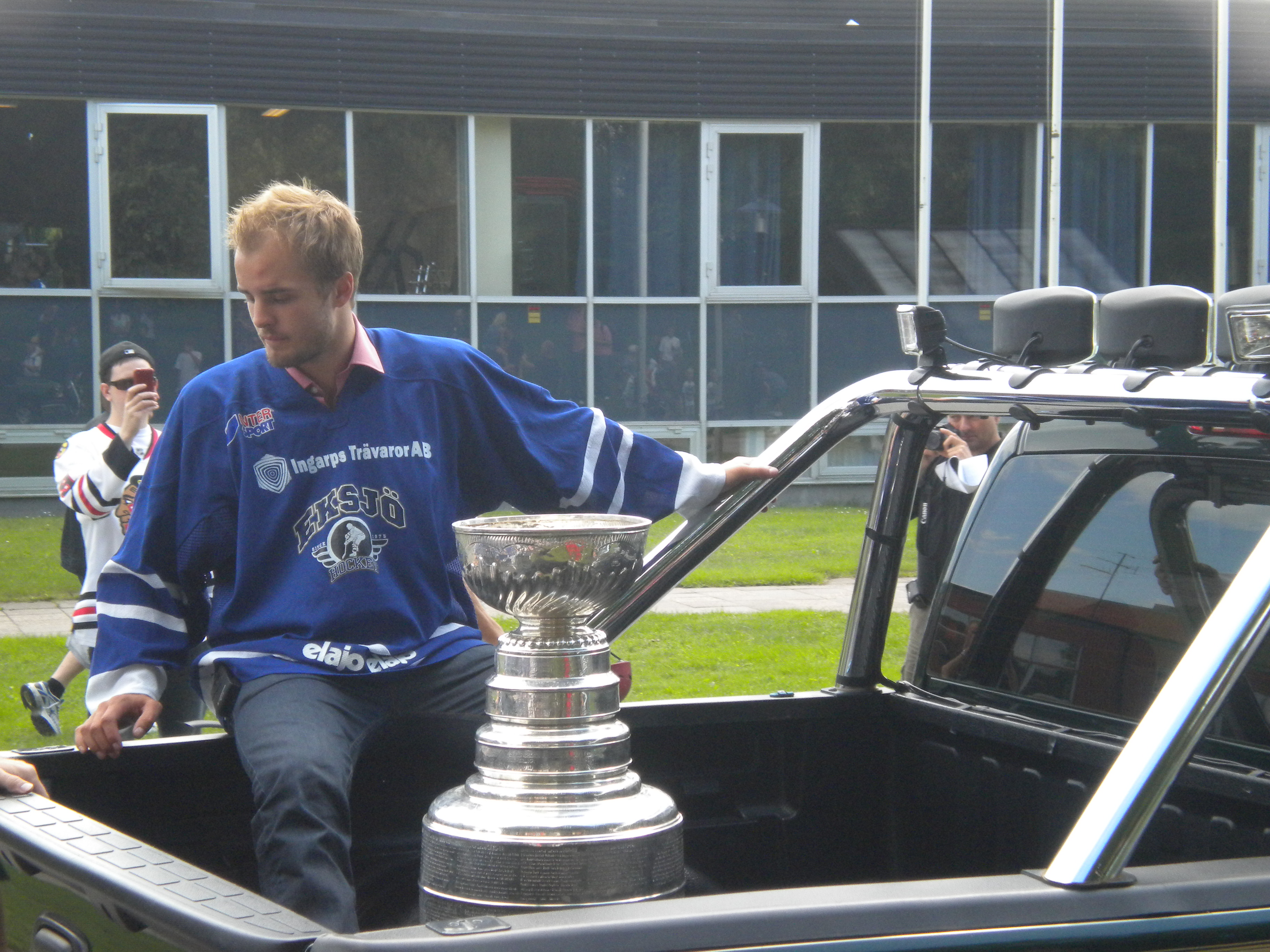
Hjalmarsson brings the Stanley Cup to Eksjö, Sweden, after the Blackhawks won the 2010 Stanley Cup Final

On 9 July 2010, shortly after the end of the season, Hjalmarsson signed a four-year, $14 million offer sheet with the San Jose Sharks. Three days later, however, on 12 July, the Blackhawks announced that they would match the offer sheet. Hjalmarsson became the first NHL defenceman in 13 years to receive an offer sheet as a restricted free agent, and, critically, Chicago's matching of the offer meant that they no longer had enough cap space to re-sign goaltender Antti Niemi, who coincidentally ended up joining the Sharks later that off-season.

During 2012–13 NHL lockout, Hjalmarsson played in Italy's Serie A and in the IIHF Continental Cup with HC Bolzano.

During game seven of the Western Conference's semifinal series against the Detroit Red Wings, with the score tied at 1–1 late in the third period, Hjalmarsson scored what appeared to be a go-ahead goal with 1:47 left in regulation time, but referee Stephen Walkom called offsetting penalties on Detroit's Kyle Quincey and Chicago's Brandon Saad just before the puck went in, so the goal was disallowed. Brent Seabrook went on to score the game-winning goal in overtime, to win the series for the Blackhawks. The Blackhawks won the 2013 Stanley Cup Final. During the 2013 off-season, Hjalmarsson signed a five-year extension with the Blackhawks, at an annual average salary of $4.1 million.

The Blackhawks won the Stanley Cup again in 2015, making Hjalmarsson one of only seven players to be part of the 2010, 2013, and 2015 Stanley Cup victories.

=== Arizona Coyotes and initial retirement ===
After the 2016–17 season, his 10th year with the Blackhawks, Hjalmarsson's tenure with the club came to an end as he was dealt to the Arizona Coyotes in exchange for Connor Murphy and Laurent Dauphin on 23 June 2017. Hjalmarsson was named an alternate captain for the Coyotes to begin the 2017–18 season. On 1 July 2018, Hjalmarsson signed a two-year, $10 million contract extension with the Coyotes.

On 25 July 2021, Hjalmarsson retired from professional ice hockey after 14 seasons in the NHL.

=== Return to HV71 ===
After one season away from professional play, Hjalmarsson came out of retirement to re-sign with HV71 on 10 November 2022. After the 2022–23 season Hjalmarsson retired once again.

== Career statistics ==
=== Regular season and playoffs ===
			Regular season					Playoffs
Season	Team	League	GP	G	A	Pts	PIM	GP	G	A	Pts	PIM
2001–02	Eksjö HC	SWE.5	1	0	0	0	2	—	—	—	—	—
2003–04	HV71	J20	15	1	3	4	14	2	0	0	0	8
2004–05	HV71	J18 Allsv	3	0	2	2	4	—	—	—	—	—
2004–05	HV71	J20	31	4	11	15	87	—	—	—	—	—
2004–05	HV71	SEL	14	0	0	0	0	—	—	—	—	—
2005–06	HV71	J20	7	3	2	5	12	—	—	—	—	—
2005–06	HV71	SEL	4	1	2	3	0	12	0	1	1	4
2006–07	HV71	J20	7	0	2	2	14	—	—	—	—	—
2006–07	IK Oskarshamn	Allsv	8	1	2	3	6	—	—	—	—	—
2006–07	HV71	SEL	37	2	0	2	24	14	1	1	2	0
2007–08	Rockford IceHogs	AHL	47	4	9	13	31	12	0	4	4	8
2007–08	Chicago Blackhawks	NHL	13	0	1	1	13	—	—	—	—	—
2008–09	Rockford IceHogs	AHL	52	2	16	18	53	—	—	—	—	—
2008–09	Chicago Blackhawks	NHL	21	1	2	3	0	17	0	1	1	6
2009–10	Chicago Blackhawks	NHL	77	2	15	17	20	22	1	7	8	6
2010–11	Chicago Blackhawks	NHL	80	3	7	10	39	7	0	2	2	2
2011–12	Chicago Blackhawks	NHL	69	1	14	15	14	6	0	1	1	4
2012–13	HC Bolzano	ITA	16	6	16	22	8	—	—	—	—	—
2012–13	Chicago Blackhawks	NHL	46	2	8	10	22	23	0	5	5	4
2013–14	Chicago Blackhawks	NHL	81	4	22	26	34	19	0	4	4	14
2014–15	Chicago Blackhawks	NHL	82	3	16	19	44	23	1	5	6	8
2015–16	Chicago Blackhawks	NHL	81	2	22	24	32	7	0	1	1	0
2016–17	Chicago Blackhawks	NHL	73	5	13	18	20	4	0	0	0	2
2017–18	Arizona Coyotes	NHL	48	1	8	9	18	—	—	—	—	—
2018–19	Arizona Coyotes	NHL	82	0	10	10	44	—	—	—	—	—
2019–20	Arizona Coyotes	NHL	27	1	4	5	14	9	0	1	1	6
2020–21	Arizona Coyotes	NHL	41	0	5	5	18	—	—	—	—	—
2022–23	HV71	SHL	17	0	3	3	4	—	—	—	—	—
SHL totals			72	3	5	8	28	26	1	2	3	4
NHL totals			821	25	147	172	332	137	2	27	29	52

=== International ===
Medal record

Men's ice hockey

Representing Sweden

Olympic Games
Silver medal – second place	2014 Sochi	

IIHF World U18 Championship
Bronze medal – third place	2005 Plzen	

Year	Team	Event	Result	GP	G	A	Pts	PIM
2005	Sweden	WJC18	3rd place, bronze medalist(s)	7	1	4	5	6
2007	Sweden	WJC	4th	7	2	1	3	4
2012	Sweden	WC	6th	8	0	3	3	2
2014	Sweden	OG	2nd place, silver medalist(s)	6	0	0	0	0
2016	Sweden	WCH	3rd	4	0	0	0	2
Junior totals				14	3	5	8	10
Senior totals				18	0	3	3	4

== See also ==
- List of NHL players who have signed offer sheets
