= Jason Williams (ice hockey) =

Canadian ice hockey player (born 1980)

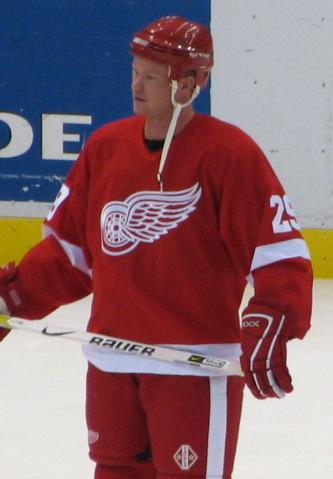
- Williams during his first tenure with the Detroit Red Wings
- Born: August 11, 1980 (age 46) London, Ontario, Canada
- Height: 5 ft 11 in (180 cm)
- Weight: 194 lb (88 kg; 13 st 12 lb)
- Position: Right wing
- Shot: Right
- Played for: Detroit Red Wings; Porin Ässät; Chicago Blackhawks; Atlanta Thrashers; Columbus Blue Jackets; Dallas Stars; Pittsburgh Penguins; HC Ambrì-Piotta; Kölner Haie; Ritten Sport; Nottingham Panthers; Brantford Blast; Dundas Real McCoys
- National team: Canada
- NHL draft: Undrafted
- Playing career: 2000–2017

Jason Williams (born August 11, 1980) is a Canadian former professional ice hockey winger. Despite going undrafted, Williams played with the Detroit Red Wings, Chicago Blackhawks, Atlanta Thrashers, Columbus Blue Jackets, Dallas Stars, and the Pittsburgh Penguins of the National Hockey League (NHL). He was a member of the 2002 Stanley Cup championship Red Wings team. He is currently the head coach of the St. Thomas Stars of the Greater Ontario Hockey League (GOHL).

== Early life ==
Williams was born on August 11, 1980, in London, Ontario, Canada. He attended Regina Mundi High School in London, Ontario, Canada. As a youth, he played in the 1994 Quebec International Pee-Wee Hockey Tournament with a minor ice hockey team from London.

== Playing career ==
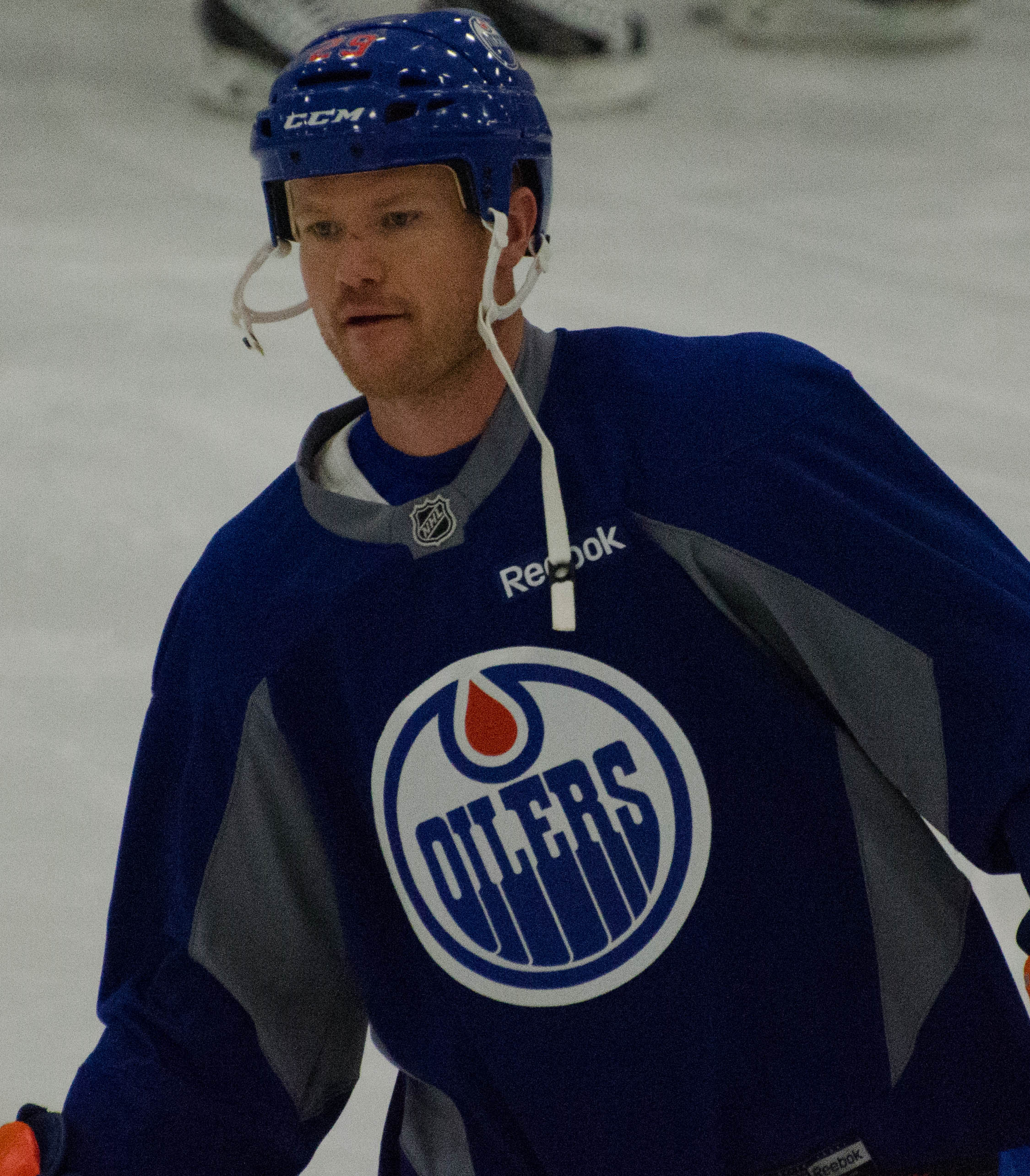
Williams picture during Edmonton Oilers training camp in 2014.

=== Detroit Red Wings ===
Williams was signed as an undrafted free agent by the Detroit Red Wings on September 18, 2000. He played the first few seasons with Detroit's minor league affiliates in the American Hockey League, the Cincinnati Mighty Ducks and the Grand Rapids Griffins. In 2001–02, he played 25 games with the Red Wings and scored his first career NHL goal. Williams would also suit up for the Red Wings in nine playoff games en route to a Stanley Cup championship.

When NHL play was halted due to the 2004–05 NHL lockout, Williams played overseas in the SM-liiga with Porin Ässät. Returning to the Wings in 2005–06 under new head coach Mike Babcock, Williams broke out with 21 goals and 58 points, frequently playing on a line with Steve Yzerman and Robert Lang. On October 22, 2005, Williams notched his first career hat trick in a 6–0 win over the Columbus Blue Jackets. All three goals came in the first period of that game; it was the first time Red Wings player scored three times in a single period since Darren McCarty's hat trick in the third period of game one against the Colorado Avalanche in the 2002 Western Conference Finals.

Following Williams' breakout season, he re-signed with Detroit on a new two-year deal worth $3.2 million. On November 8, 2006, during a game against the Edmonton Oilers, Williams was injured when he was checked from behind the net by Raffi Torres, causing his head to hit the ice. Williams was taken off the ice on a stretcher and taken to Detroit Medical Center. He was released from the hospital on November 9 with facial lacerations and a first-degree concussion. The Red Wings put him on the injured reserve list, causing him to miss a minimum of 10 days. According to the Red Wings, he never lost consciousness.

=== Chicago Blackhawks ===
Later that season, Williams was sent to the Chicago Blackhawks on February 26, 2007, in a three-way trade that also included the Philadelphia Flyers. The Flyers received a third round draft pick and Lasse Kukkonen from the Blackhawks in exchange for Kyle Calder; in turn, the Blackhawks sent Calder to the Red Wings in exchange for Williams. He scored twice in his first return to Joe Louis Arena as a member of the Blackhawks.

=== Atlanta Thrashers/Columbus Blue Jackets ===
After a 36-point season in 43 games with Chicago, Williams became an unrestricted free agent and was signed by the Atlanta Thrashers on July 13, 2008, to a one-year, $2.2 million deal. On January 14, 2009, Williams was traded by the Thrashers to the Columbus Blue Jackets for Clay Wilson and a sixth round draft pick. Williams performed well with Columbus, scoring 12 goals and 17 assists for the remainder of the 2008–09 season as the Blue Jackets qualified for the playoffs for the first time in their history. Williams and the Blue Jackets were swept in the first round by Williams' former team, the Detroit Red Wings.

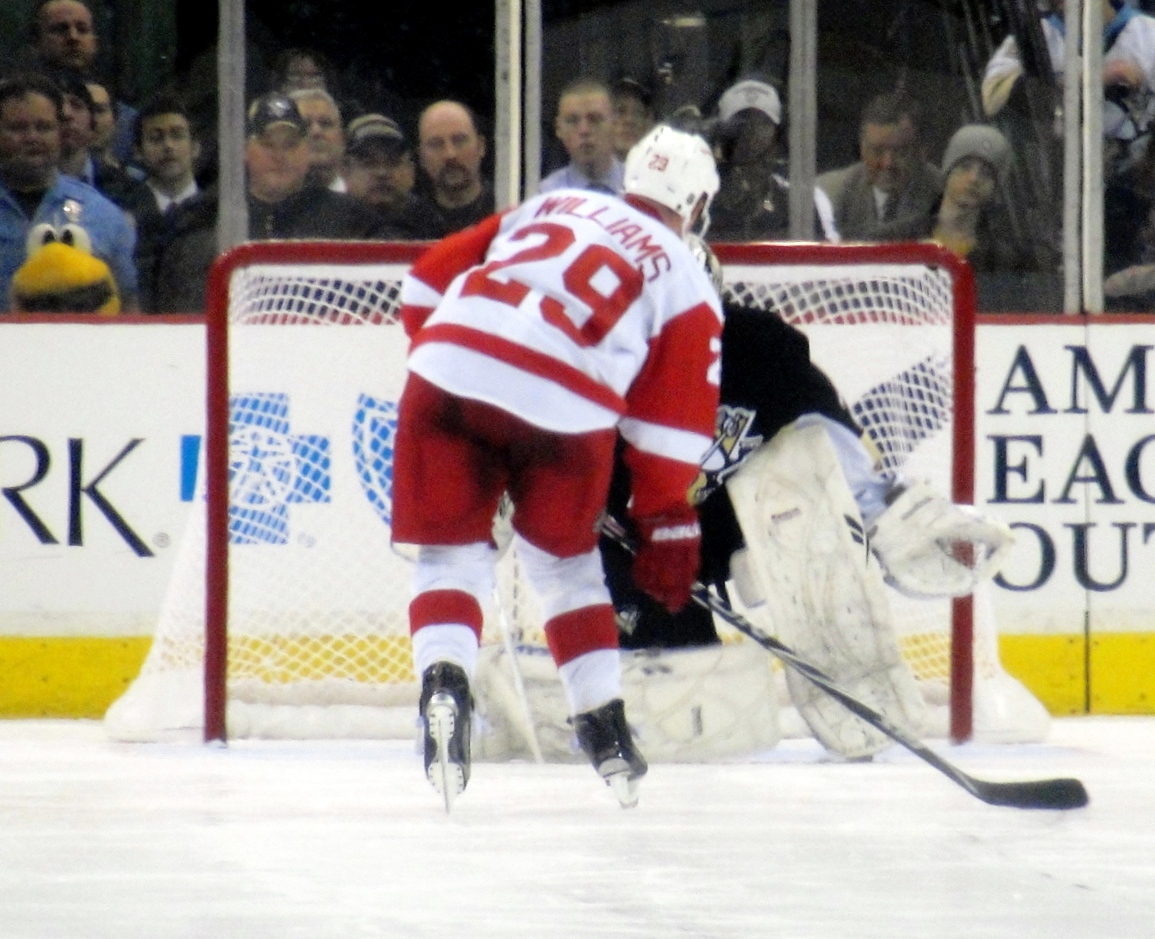
Williams shootout attempt vs Marc-André Fleury, January 2010.

=== Return to Detroit ===
On August 6, 2009, Williams returned as a free agent to the Red Wings after signing a one-year contract. On November 7, 2009 in a game against the Toronto Maple Leafs, Williams suffered a fractured fibula, and missed several weeks with the injury. On January 29, 2010, Williams was activated off of injured reserve from his injury. He scored a powerplay goal in his first game back from injury against the Nashville Predators, a 4-2 Red Wings victory.

=== Remaining professional career ===
On December 27, 2010, Williams was signed as a free agent by the New York Rangers and played for their AHL affiliate, the Connecticut Whale. On February 11, 2011, he was released from his PTO with the Whale. Williams was then signed as a free agent by the Dallas Stars on February 12, 2011, for the remainder of the season.

On July 26, 2011, he signed a one-year, two-way contract worth $600,000 with the Pittsburgh Penguins. Williams was assigned to AHL affiliate, the Wilkes-Barre/Scranton Penguins, for the majority of the 2011–12 season, however was recalled to produce a goal and assist in an eight-game stint with Pittsburgh.

With limited NHL interest in 2012, Williams opted to resume his career in Europe, agreeing to a two-year contract with the Swiss club, HC Ambrì-Piotta of the National League A. Over two seasons, with Ambri, Williams became entrenched in a top scoring line role, contributing with 64 points in 79 games.

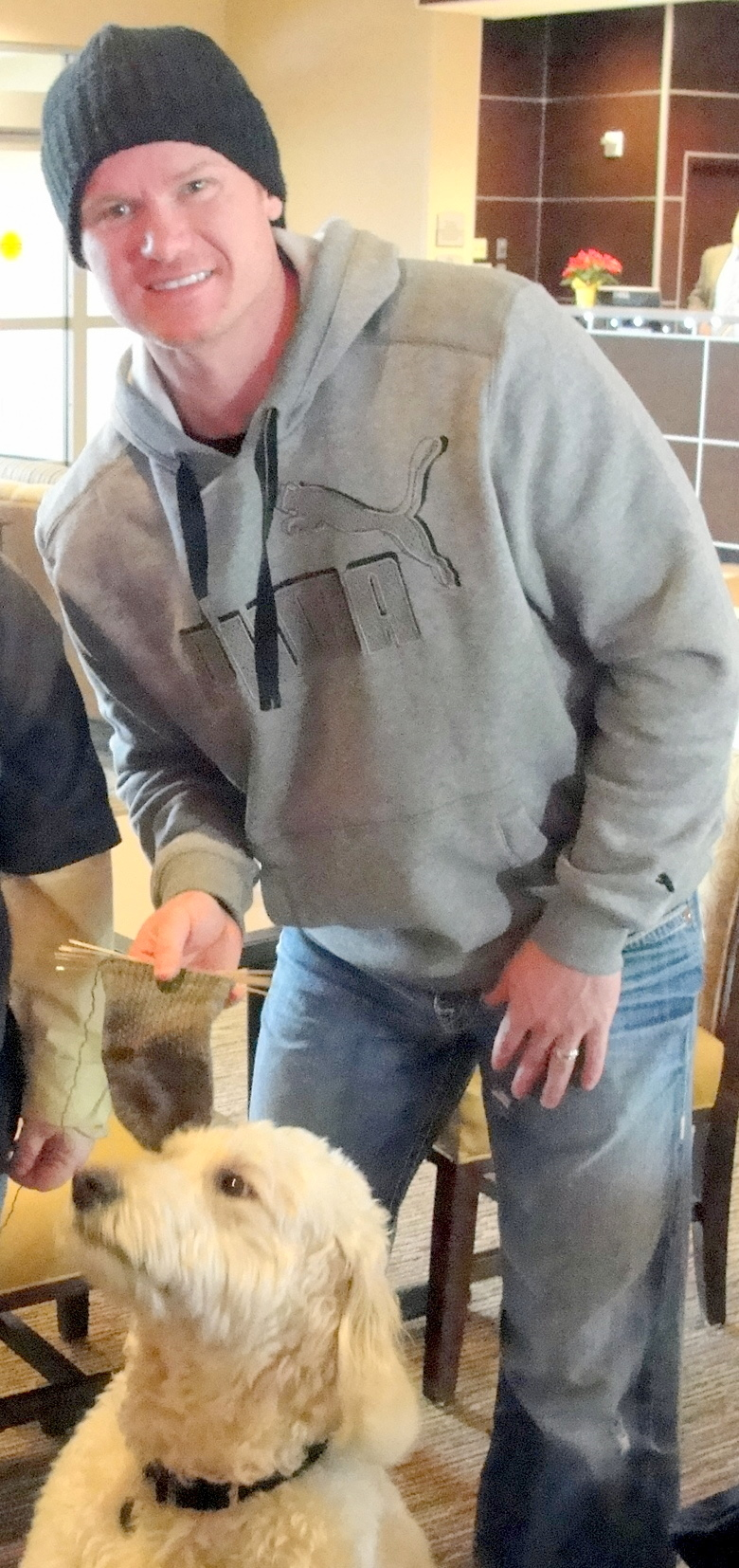
Jason Williams with his dog, Harley. November 2011.

Williams opted to return to North America following the completion of his contract in Switzerland, to sign a one-year free agent contract with the Oklahoma City Barons of the AHL on July 25, 2014. In the 2014–15 season, Williams provided the Barons with a veteran presence and leadership while showing no loss of his offensive touch with 53 points in 72 games.

On July 16, 2015, Williams made another return to Europe in signing with his first German club, Kölner Haie of the DEL, on a one-year deal. He sustained a back injury in pre-season and played only nine games during the 2015–16 season.

In late October 2016, he signed a short-term deal with Italian side Ritten Sport. Williams was instrumental in helping the team reach the IIHF Continental Cup final four, tallying three goals and three assists in three games. He also scored three goals and assisted on one more in two Alps Hockey League contests for Ritten.

In December 2016, Williams moved to the UK to sign for the Nottingham Panthers.

Williams has since had spells with Allan Cup Hockey (ACH) sides Brantford Blast and Dundas Real McCoys.

== Personal life ==
Williams and his wife Julie have two children together.

== Career statistics ==
=== Regular season and playoffs ===
| | | | Regular season | | | | | Playoffs |
| Season | Team | League | GP | G | A | Pts | PIM | GP | G | A | Pts | PIM |
|---|---|---|---|---|---|---|---|---|---|---|---|---|
| 1995–96 | Mount Brydges Bulldogs | SOJHL | 36 | 31 | 28 | 59 | 18 | — | — | — | — | — |
| 1996–97 | Peterborough Petes | OHL | 60 | 4 | 8 | 12 | 8 | 10 | 1 | 0 | 1 | 2 |
| 1997–98 | Peterborough Petes | OHL | 55 | 8 | 27 | 35 | 31 | 4 | 0 | 1 | 1 | 2 |
| 1998–99 | Peterborough Petes | OHL | 68 | 26 | 48 | 74 | 42 | 5 | 1 | 2 | 3 | 2 |
| 1999–00 | Peterborough Petes | OHL | 66 | 36 | 37 | 73 | 64 | 5 | 2 | 1 | 3 | 2 |
| 2000–01 | Cincinnati Mighty Ducks | AHL | 76 | 24 | 45 | 69 | 48 | 1 | 0 | 0 | 0 | 2 |
| 2000–01 | Detroit Red Wings | NHL | 5 | 0 | 3 | 3 | 2 | 2 | 0 | 0 | 0 | 0 |
| 2001–02 | Cincinnati Mighty Ducks | AHL | 52 | 23 | 27 | 50 | 27 | 3 | 0 | 1 | 1 | 6 |
| 2001–02 | Detroit Red Wings | NHL | 25 | 8 | 2 | 10 | 4 | 9 | 0 | 0 | 0 | 2 |
| 2002–03 | Grand Rapids Griffins | AHL | 45 | 23 | 22 | 45 | 18 | 15 | 1 | 7 | 8 | 16 |
| 2002–03 | Detroit Red Wings | NHL | 16 | 3 | 3 | 6 | 2 | — | — | — | — | — |
| 2003–04 | Detroit Red Wings | NHL | 49 | 6 | 7 | 13 | 15 | 3 | 0 | 0 | 0 | 2 |
| 2004–05 | Ässät | SM-l | 43 | 26 | 17 | 43 | 52 | 2 | 1 | 1 | 2 | 4 |
| 2005–06 | Detroit Red Wings | NHL | 80 | 21 | 37 | 58 | 26 | 6 | 1 | 1 | 2 | 6 |
| 2006–07 | Detroit Red Wings | NHL | 58 | 11 | 15 | 26 | 24 | — | — | — | — | — |
| 2006–07 | Chicago Blackhawks | NHL | 20 | 4 | 2 | 6 | 20 | — | — | — | — | — |
| 2007–08 | Chicago Blackhawks | NHL | 43 | 13 | 23 | 36 | 22 | — | — | — | — | — |
| 2008–09 | Atlanta Thrashers | NHL | 41 | 7 | 11 | 18 | 8 | — | — | — | — | — |
| 2008–09 | Columbus Blue Jackets | NHL | 39 | 12 | 17 | 29 | 16 | 4 | 0 | 1 | 1 | 2 |
| 2009–10 | Detroit Red Wings | NHL | 44 | 6 | 9 | 15 | 8 | 3 | 0 | 0 | 0 | 0 |
| 2010–11 | Connecticut Whale | AHL | 17 | 4 | 5 | 9 | 10 | — | — | — | — | — |
| 2010–11 | Dallas Stars | NHL | 27 | 2 | 3 | 5 | 6 | — | — | — | — | — |
| 2011–12 | Wilkes–Barre/Scranton Penguins | AHL | 59 | 13 | 29 | 42 | 32 | 12 | 3 | 10 | 13 | 2 |
| 2011–12 | Pittsburgh Penguins | NHL | 8 | 1 | 1 | 2 | 4 | — | — | — | — | — |
| 2012–13 | HC Ambrì–Piotta | NLA | 47 | 26 | 20 | 46 | 16 | — | — | — | — | — |
| 2013–14 | HC Ambrì–Piotta | NLA | 32 | 8 | 10 | 18 | 12 | 2 | 0 | 1 | 1 | 0 |
| 2014–15 | Oklahoma City Barons | AHL | 72 | 21 | 32 | 53 | 30 | 10 | 0 | 5 | 5 | 6 |
| 2015–16 | Kölner Haie | DEL | 9 | 0 | 3 | 3 | 8 | — | — | — | — | — |
| 2016–17 | Ritten Sport | AlpsHL | 2 | 1 | 3 | 4 | 0 | — | — | — | — | — |
| 2016–17 | Nottingham Panthers | GBR | 11 | 5 | 9 | 14 | 0 | 2 | 0 | 1 | 1 | 0 |
| 2017–18 | Brantford Blast | ACH | 10 | 8 | 7 | 15 | 2 | — | — | — | — | — |
| 2018–19 | Dundas Real McCoys | ACH | 2 | 1 | 4 | 5 | 0 | — | — | — | — | — |
| 2019–20 | Dundas Real McCoys | ACH | 4 | 1 | 3 | 4 | 0 | 4 | 1 | 1 | 2 | 0 |
| AHL totals | | | 321 | 108 | 160 | 268 | 165 | 41 | 4 | 23 | 27 | 32 |
| NHL totals | | | 455 | 94 | 133 | 227 | 157 | 27 | 1 | 2 | 3 | 12 |

=== International ===
| Year | Team | Event | Result | GP | G | A | Pts | PIM |
|---|---|---|---|---|---|---|---|---|
| 2006 | Canada | WC | 4th | 9 | 2 | 5 | 7 | 2 |
| Senior totals | | | | 9 | 2 | 5 | 7 | 2 |

== Awards and achievements ==
- 1999–2000 OHL Third All-Star Team
- 1999–2000 OHL Plus/Minus Award
- 2001–02 NHL Stanley Cup champion (Detroit Red Wings)
- Winner of the 2012 Spengler Cup
