= Windsor St. Clair Saints =

- City: Windsor, Ontario
- League: Major League Hockey
- Operated: 2001-2008
- Home arena: South Windsor Arena
- Colours: Green, Yellow, and White
- General manager: Kevin Hamlin
- Head coach: Kevin Hamlin

Previous franchise history
- 1960-1967: Western Ontario Tech
- 1967-1986: St. Clair Saints

The Windsor St. Clair Saints were a Senior "AAA" ice hockey team based in St. Clair College in Windsor, Ontario, Canada. They joined the Ontario Hockey Association's Major League Hockey in 2006, only to leave in 2008.

== History ==
The St. Clair Saints hockey club first emerged in 1967 as a member of the Ontario Colleges Athletic Association of the Canadian Colleges Athletic Association.

The Saints dominated the OCAA early, winning its first three championships in 1968, 1969, and 1970.

In 1972, the beginnings of a Saints OCAA dynasty was born. The Saints won the 1973 championship. Then in 1975, they won again. In 1976, they won for the third time in four years and then went on to Camrose, Alberta to defeat Selkirk College and win the CCAA National Championship. In 1977, the Saints won the OCAA again and as well in 1979. In seven seasons, the St. Clair Saints won five OCAA championships and a CCAA National Championship. In this span, the Saints also won a national silver medal and two national bronze medals. It seems that the Saints went on hiatus for much of the next two decades. In 2001, the Saints were back on the ice full-time. In 2002 and 2003, the Saints were again OCAA champions, beating Humber College both times, after more than a two decade gap. In 2001, the CCAA announced that there was not enough national interest in national championships anymore, so neither the 2002 or 2003 teams had the opportunity at earning another national championship for St. Clair College. After finishing in first place for the third straight year, the Saints were almost upset by Sir Sandford Fleming College in the semi-final and then were beaten in two straight games by Humber in the final. After losing game one 6–3, the Saints battled hard in game two. With leading scorer Pavel Shtefan out of the lineup, the Saints battled into double overtime to lose on a Humber goal 5:11 into the fifth frame. The Saints were baffled by the Humber goaltender as he stopped 79 of 80 shots to win the game. This would be the Saints final OCAA game.

Championship banners (click to enlarge).

In 2004, the OCAA announced that it was folding due to lack of interest from competitive colleges. The Saints spent the 2004–05 and 2005-06 campaigns playing an independent exhibition schedule against American and Canadian collegiate and senior clubs.

In 2006, the Windsor St. Clair Saints were allowed expansion into the Ontario Hockey Association's Major League Hockey. Now playing at the Senior AAA level, the Saints were eligible to compete for the Allan Cup.

Despite being the only collegiate team in the 5-team MLH (the other four are club teams), the Saints finished first overall in the 2006–07 regular season. In the league semi-finals, the Saints defeated the Tillsonburg Vipers 4-games-to-2. In the league final, the Saints came apart and were swept by the Brantford Blast 4-games-to-none.

The 2007-08 Season had them again as the only collegiate team in the MLH. With a record of 16 wins, 12 losses, and 2 ties, the Saints were in the hunt for a second regular season crown, but fell short finishing in a close third place. Their first round opponents in the league semi-finals were the Brantford Blast. Brantford had stacked their line up with former NHLers at the end of the season, including Brent Gretzky, in preparation to host the 100th Allan Cup this year. Despite the Saints badly outshooting the Blast in every game of the series, the Saints were defeated 4-games-to-none.

On April 21, 2008, it was announced through the Windsor Star that the Saints were to cease operations. As the only college team in the league, the Saints felt the MLH was not a good fit. The Saints operated through signing students from their college to play, while other teams could trade and pursue free agents. The Saints may eventually apply for entry into the National Collegiate Athletic Association.

== Season-by-season standings ==
Note: GP = Games played, W = Wins, L = Losses, T = Ties, OTL = Overtime losses, SOL = Shootout Loses*, Pts = Points, GF = Goals for, GA = Goals against

| Season | GP | W | L | T | OTL | GF | GA | P | Results |
|---|---|---|---|---|---|---|---|---|---|
| 1967-68 | Statistics Not Available | | | | | | | | |
| 1968-69 | 7 | 6 | 0 | 1 | - | 46 | 19 | 13 | 2nd OCAA-W |
| 1969-70 | 7 | 6 | 0 | 1 | - | 47 | 27 | 13 | 2nd OCAA-W |
| 1970-71 | 13 | 8 | 4 | 1 | - | 84 | 60 | 17 | 2nd OCAA-S |
| 1971-72 | 20 | 18 | 2 | 0 | - | 151 | 57 | 36 | 1st OCAA-S |
| 1972-73 | 17 | 14 | 3 | 0 | - | 137 | 48 | 28 | 1st OCAA-W |
| 1973-74 | 18 | 14 | 4 | 0 | - | 113 | 57 | 28 | 1st OCAA-W |
| 1974-75 | 19 | 17 | 2 | 0 | - | 181 | 67 | 34 | 1st OCAA-W |
| 1975-76 | 20 | 20 | 0 | 0 | - | 206 | 45 | 40 | 1st OCAA-W |
| 1976-77 | 17 | 13 | 1 | 3 | - | 149 | 49 | 29 | 2nd OCAA |
| 1977-78 | 20 | 17 | 3 | 0 | - | 123 | 64 | 34 | 1st OCAA |
| 1978-79 | 18 | 15 | 3 | 0 | - | 147 | 45 | 30 | 1st OCAA |
| 1979-80 | 18 | 13 | 5 | 0 | - | 106 | 65 | 26 | 1st OCAA |
| 1980-81 | 16 | 13 | 3 | 0 | - | 112 | 72 | 26 | 2nd OCAA |
| 1981-82 | 14 | 7 | 7 | 0 | - | 87 | 92 | 14 | 3rd OCAA |
| 1982-83 | 24 | 11 | 13 | 0 | - | 110 | 112 | 22 | 5th OCAA |
| 1983-84 | 24 | 13 | 10 | 1 | - | 130 | 115 | 27 | T-2nd OCAA |
| 1984-85 | 26 | 15 | 11 | 0 | - | 153 | 124 | 30 | 3rd OCAA |
| 1985-86 | 24 | 10 | 13 | 1 | - | 121 | 146 | 21 | 4th OCAA |
| 1986-01 | Did Not Participate | | | | | | | | |
| 2001-02 | 13 | 11 | 1 | 1 | - | -- | -- | 23 | 1st OCAA |
| 2002-03 | 15 | 13 | 1 | 1 | 0 | 94 | 28 | 27 | 1st OCAA |
| 2003-04 | 15 | 13 | 2 | 0 | 0 | 115 | 42 | 26 | 1st OCAA |
| 2004-06 | Played Independent Schedule | | | | | | | | |
| 2006-07 | 30 | 19 | 10 | - | 1 | 154 | 116 | 39 | 1st MLH |
| 2007-08 | 30 | 16 | 12 | - | 2 | 122 | 103 | 34 | 3rd MLH |

=== Playoffs ===
- 2002 Won League

St. Clair Saints defeated Conestoga Condors in semi-final
St. Clair Saints defeated Humber Hawks in final

- 2003 Won League

St. Clair Saints defeated Conestoga Condors in semi-final
St. Clair Saints defeated Humber Hawks in final

- 2004 Lost final

St. Clair Saints defeated Sir Sandford Fleming Knights 2-games-to-1 in semi-final
Humber Hawks defeated St. Clair Saints 2-games-to-none in final

- 2007 Lost final

Windsor St. Clair Saints defeated Tillsonburg Vipers 4-games-to-2 in semi-final
Brantford Blast defeated Windsor St. Clair Saints 4-games-to-none in final

- 2008 Lost semi-final

Brantford Blast defeated Windsor St. Clair Saints 4-games-to-none in semi-final

== Notable alumni ==
- Del Hall
- Keith Kokkola
- Dan Newman
