= Steven Rice =

Canadian ice hockey player (born 1971)

- Born: May 26, 1971 (age 55) Kitchener, Ontario, Canada
- Height: 6 ft 1 in (185 cm)
- Weight: 223 lb (101 kg; 15 st 13 lb)
- Position: Right wing
- Shot: Right
- Played for: New York Rangers; Edmonton Oilers; Hartford Whalers; Carolina Hurricanes
- NHL draft: 20th overall, 1989; New York Rangers
- Playing career: 1990–1998; 2002–2007

Steven Rice (born May 26, 1971) is a Canadian former professional ice hockey right winger who played eight seasons in the National Hockey League (NHL) in the 1990s. Rice was born in Kitchener, Ontario.

Rice was drafted 20th overall by the New York Rangers in the 1989 NHL entry draft. Following his outstanding performance at the 1991 World Junior Hockey Championships, in which he captained Canada to the gold medal, he was considered one of the top young power forward prospects in the game. In the summer of 1991, he was sent to the Edmonton Oilers as one of the centerpieces going the other way in the trade of superstar centre Mark Messier.

His results in Edmonton would be mixed - he spent most of his first two seasons there with their AHL affiliate, but established himself as a full-time NHL player in 1993–94 scoring 17 goals. Following that season, he signed free-agent offer sheet with the Hartford Whalers, and joined the Whalers the following season when Edmonton declined to match the offer. In his three years in Hartford, he established himself as a quality role player, scoring a career high 21 goals in 1996–97. However, a nightmare campaign in 1997–98 following the franchise's move to Carolina, in which he scored just 2 goals, effectively ended his NHL career. He retired at the premature age of 27.

Rice came out of retirement in 2002, playing in the Ontario Hockey Association's Major League Hockey, for the Cambridge Hornets until 2006, and then briefly for the Brantford Blast in the same league before retiring for good in 2006.

He played 329 career NHL games, scoring 64 goals and 61 assists for 125 points.

== Career statistics ==
			Regular season					Playoffs
Season	Team	League	GP	G	A	Pts	PIM	GP	G	A	Pts	PIM
1986–87	Waterloo Siskins	MWJHL	7	4	1	5	10	—	—	—	—	—
1987–88	Kitchener Rangers	OHL	59	11	14	25	43	4	0	1	1	0
1988–89	Kitchener Rangers	OHL	64	36	31	67	42	5	2	1	3	8
1989–90	Kitchener Rangers	OHL	58	39	37	76	102	16	4	8	12	24
1990–91	Kitchener Rangers	OHL	29	30	30	60	43	6	5	6	11	2
1990–91	New York Rangers	NHL	11	1	1	2	4	2	2	1	3	6
1990–91	Binghamton Rangers	AHL	8	4	1	5	12	5	2	0	2	2
1991–92	Edmonton Oilers	NHL	3	0	0	0	2	—	—	—	—	—
1991–92	Cape Breton Oilers	AHL	45	32	20	52	38	5	4	4	8	10
1992–93	Edmonton Oilers	NHL	28	2	5	7	28	—	—	—	—	—
1992–93	Cape Breton Oilers	AHL	51	34	28	62	63	14	4	6	10	22
1993–94	Edmonton Oilers	NHL	63	17	15	32	36	—	—	—	—	—
1994–95	Hartford Whalers	NHL	40	11	10	21	61	—	—	—	—	—
1995–96	Hartford Whalers	NHL	59	10	12	22	47	—	—	—	—	—
1996–97	Hartford Whalers	NHL	78	21	14	35	59	—	—	—	—	—
1997–98	Carolina Hurricanes	NHL	47	2	4	6	38	—	—	—	—	—
2002–03	Cambridge Hornets	OHA-Sr.	23	17	20	37	15	6	3	2	5	10
2003–04	Cambridge Hornets	OHA-Sr.	24	18	23	41	24	—	—	—	—	—
2004–05	Cambridge Hornets	OHA-Sr.	29	24	18	42	12	—	—	—	—	—
2005–06	Cambridge Hornets	MLH	24	22	13	35	41	—	—	—	—	—
2006–07	Brantford Blast	MLH	2	2	2	4	12	10	6	7	13	16
2007–08	Brantford Blast	MLH	10	3	6	9	10	10	9	7	16	8
2007–08	Brantford Blast	AC	—	—	—	—	—	5	3	6	9	12
NHL totals			329	64	61	125	275	2	2	1	3	6

Preceded by Jayson More	New York Rangers first-round draft pick 1989	Succeeded by Michael Stewart
