= Thomas Vanek =

Austrian ice hockey player (born 1984)

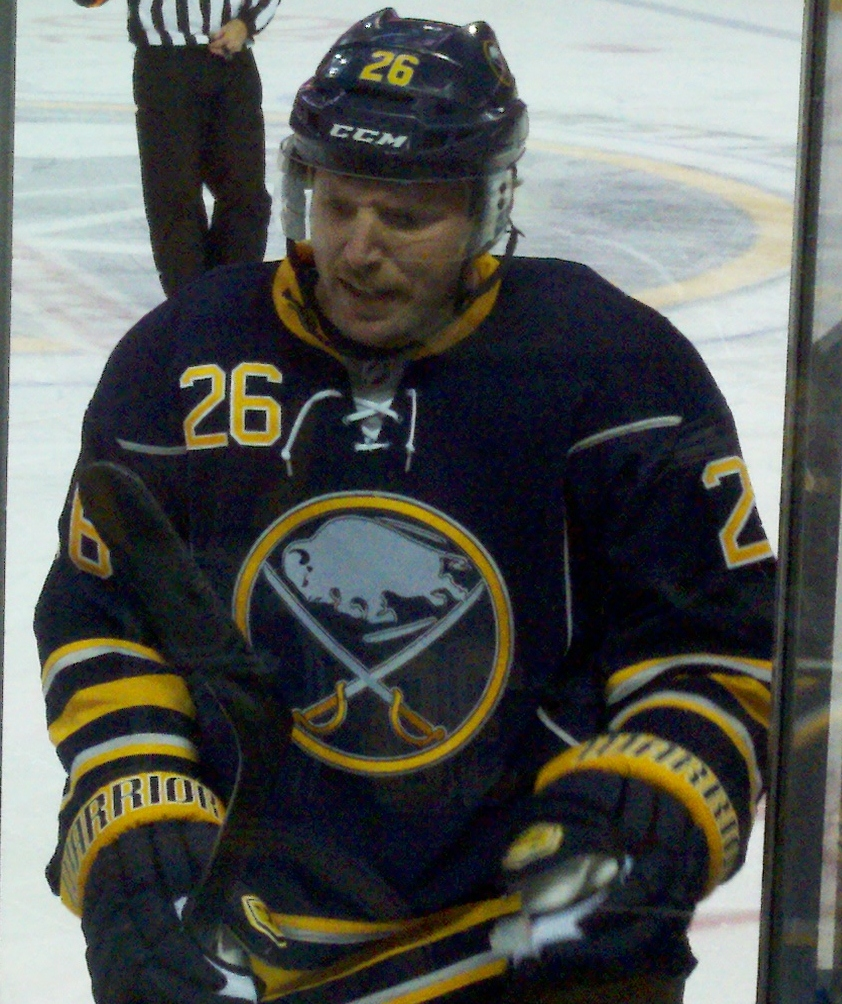
- Vanek with the Buffalo Sabres in 2011
- Born: 19 January 1984 (age 42) Baden bei Wien, Austria
- Height: 6 ft 2 in (188 cm)
- Weight: 218 lb (99 kg; 15 st 8 lb)
- Position: Left wing
- Shot: Right
- Played for: Buffalo Sabres; Graz 99ers New York Islanders; Montreal Canadiens; Minnesota Wild; Detroit Red Wings; Florida Panthers; Vancouver Canucks; Columbus Blue Jackets
- National team: Austria
- NHL draft: 5th overall, 2003; Buffalo Sabres
- Playing career: 2004–2019

Thomas Vanek (born 19 January 1984) is an Austrian former professional ice hockey winger who played fourteen seasons in the National Hockey League (NHL) for the Buffalo Sabres, Columbus Blue Jackets, Detroit Red Wings, Florida Panthers, Minnesota Wild, Montreal Canadiens, New York Islanders, and Vancouver Canucks. Vanek was drafted by the Sabres fifth overall in the 2003 NHL entry draft, making him the highest-drafted Austrian player in NHL history along with David Reinbacher in the 2023 NHL entry draft. He was inducted into the IIHF Hall of Fame in 2026.

== Early life ==
Vanek was born in Baden bei Wien, Austria, to a Slovak mother, Jarmila, and a Czech father, Zdeněk, who emigrated from Czechoslovakia in 1982. He was raised in Zell am See and later in Graz. During his childhood he spent considerable time at ice rinks accompanying his father, who was a professional hockey player and coach in Czechoslovakia and Austria.

As a youth, Vanek competed in the 1997 and 1998 Quebec International Pee-Wee Hockey Tournament with a team from Austria, earning the scoring title and most valuable player honours in 1997. In 1998, Vanek moved to Lacombe, Alberta, to play North American bantam hockey. He advanced to compete in the North Central Midget AA hockey league with the Lacoka Wolves, recording 74 goals and 36 assists for 110 points in 40 games during his only season with the team.

== Playing career ==
=== Pre-NHL years ===
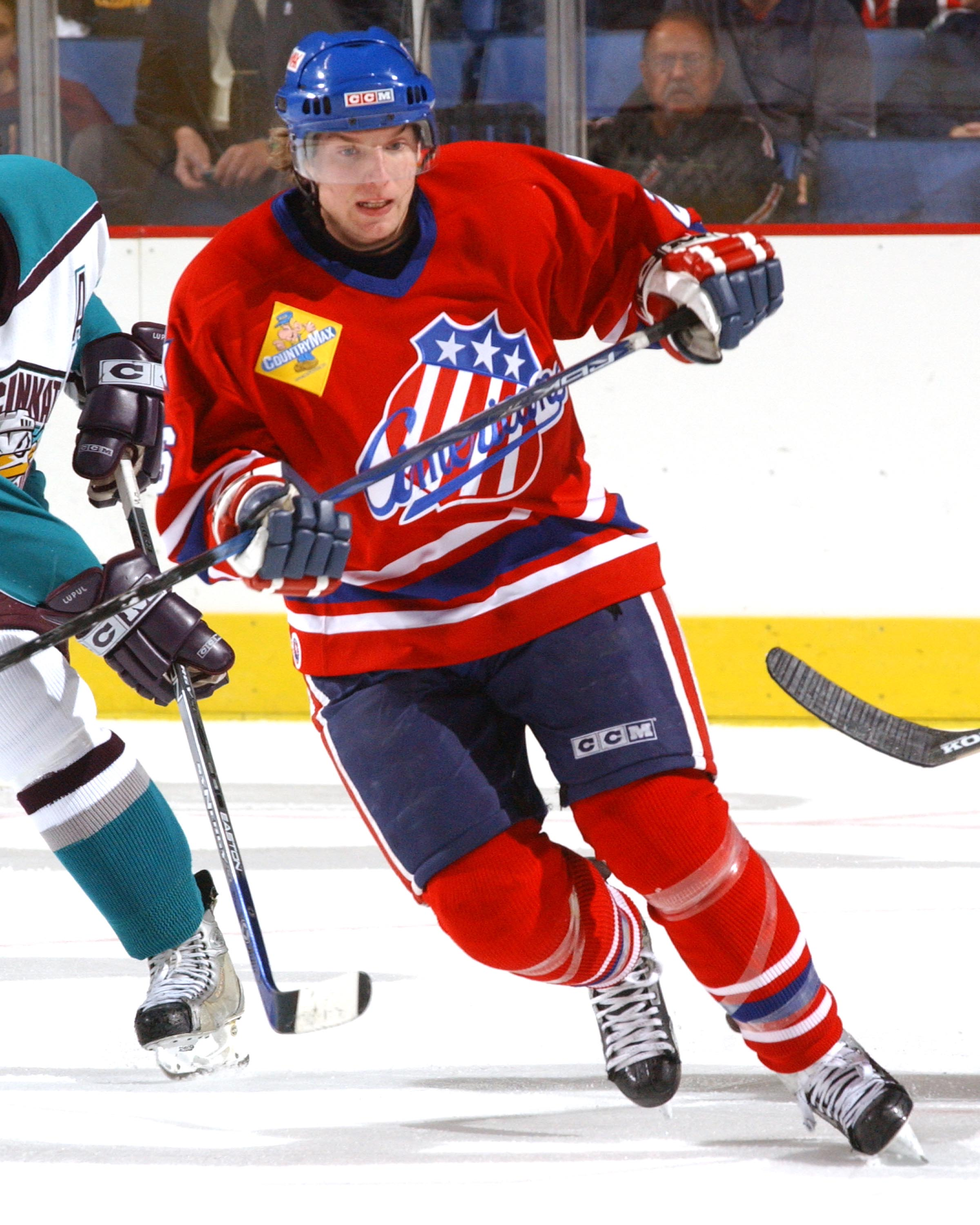
Vanek with the Rochester Americans in 2004

After playing junior hockey for the Sioux Falls Stampede of the United States Hockey League (USHL), Vanek joined the University of Minnesota Golden Gophers, leading the team in goals (31), assists (31) and points (62) in the 2002–03 season. In part due to his prolific scoring touch, the Golden Gophers won the 2003 NCAA National Championship. Vanek was named MVP of the Frozen Four tournament, scoring the game-winning goals in both the semifinal against Michigan in overtime and in the final against New Hampshire. He was also named Minnesota's team MVP for 2003, becoming the first freshman to receive the honor. He scored the most points by a Golden Gopher freshman in 2003 since Aaron Broten who scored 72 total points in 1979–80. He was the first freshman to lead the team in scoring since Mike Antonovich in 1969–70. His 31 goals also led all NCAA freshmen in goal scoring, and was fourth in the entire country. He was also the 2003 WCHA Rookie of the Year, the third Golden Gopher to win the award.

Vanek was a member of the Austrian national team in the 2004 IIHF World Championships, where he collected seven points in six games (two goals and five assists). Vanek led the Golden Gophers in goals (26) and points (51) for the second-straight season and finished fifth in points among Division I leaders with 51. Vanek was the Twin Cities Best College Athlete for 2004.

Vanek spent 2004–05 with the Sabres' American Hockey League (AHL) affiliate, the Rochester Americans, recording 68 points in 74 games and helped Rochester to the best record in the AHL. Vanek finished second on the team in points, 11 points behind Chris Taylor, but led the team in goals with 42 and in power play goals with 25. He finished second among rookies in points and led all rookies in goals scored, the latter of which was second in the league among all players.

=== Buffalo Sabres ===
Vanek signed a three-year deal with Buffalo on 3 September 2004, and began playing for the Sabres in 2005–06 after a season with their AHL affiliate. He had a promising rookie season with 25 goals and 48 points in 81 games for the Sabres. His performance tailed off in the playoffs, managing two goals in ten games.

Vanek recorded his best statistical season, the following year in 2006–07. He played in all 82 regular season games for the Sabres, scoring 43 goals, tied for fifth in the league, and 41 assists. He also finished an NHL best +47, earning the NHL Plus-Minus Award. Upon the expiration of his entry-level contract during the 2007 off-season, Vanek signed a seven-year, $50 million offer sheet from the Edmonton Oilers. The Sabres, having lost Chris Drury and Daniel Brière as free agents that off-season, immediately matched the offer sheet, thus keeping Vanek under contract until at least the end of the 2013–14 season. Despite his lucrative new contract, Vanek's production dipped to 64 points in 2007–08.

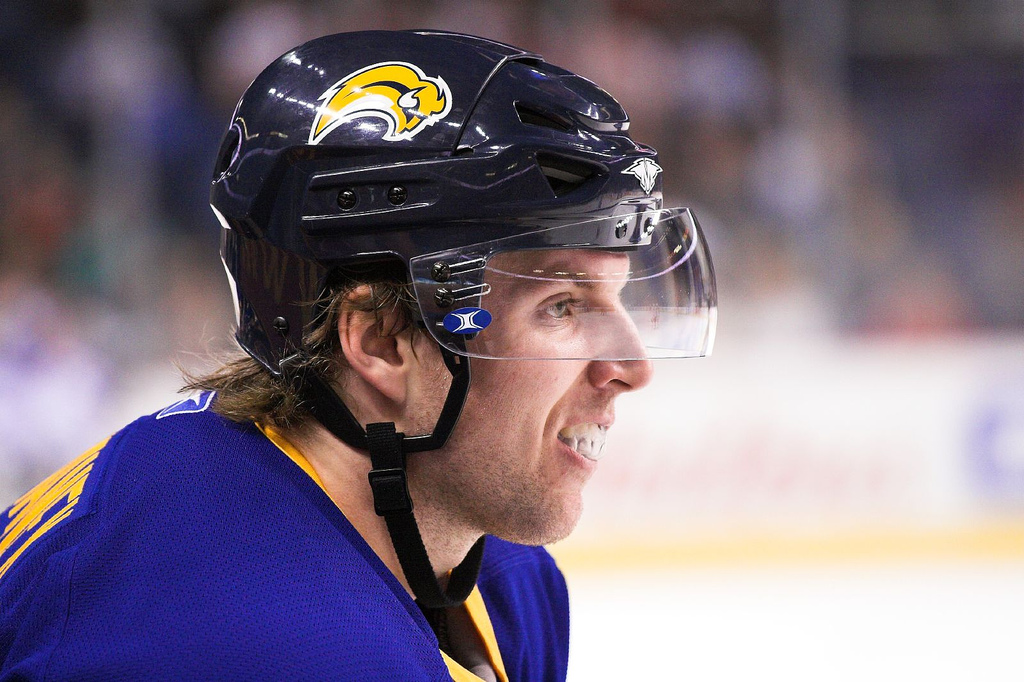
Vanek in October 2006 playing for the Buffalo Sabres

In the midst of a more productive year, however, Vanek was named to his first NHL All-Star Game in 2009 in Montreal. He helped the East to a 12–11 shootout victory over the West. Earlier in the season, on 13 December 2008, Vanek helped the Sabres reach a milestone by scoring the 10,000th goal in franchise history. Following the All-Star Game, on 4 February 2009, Vanek made NHL history by becoming only the second player to score four consecutive natural hat-trick. He recorded his fourth natural hat trick, and fifth overall, in a 5–0 win over the Toronto Maple Leafs in HSBC Arena. It was also Vanek's fourth consecutive natural hat-trick, matching an NHL record set by Cy Denneny between 1923 and 1924 with the old Ottawa Senators. Later that week, on 7 February, Vanek took a slapshot from Anton Volchenkov of the Ottawa Senators, fracturing his jaw. He underwent surgery the next day and was announced to be out of the lineup for three-to-four weeks. At the time of the injury, Vanek was third in the league goal-scoring. At the end of the 2008–09 season, Vanek would score a total of 40 goals with 24 assists, totaling 64 points. He led the NHL in powerplay goals with 20.

The 2009–10 season also started on a sour note, as Vanek sustained an upper body injury after scoring two goals in a 6–2 win against the Detroit Red Wings on 13 October. Vanek had scored three goals in four games up to that point. On 10 April 2010, he scored four goals against Ottawa (one on a penalty shot) in the first two periods.

On 1 October 2012, Vanek signed with the Graz 99ers in Austria to play for them until 4 November 2012, during the 2012–13 NHL lockout.

On 1 October 2013, the Buffalo Sabres named Vanek and Steve Ott captains; Vanek would wear the "C" for home games while Ott would wear the "C" for road games.

=== New York Islanders and Montreal Canadiens ===
On 27 October 2013, Vanek was traded to the New York Islanders for Matt Moulson, a conditional 2014 first-round draft pick and a 2015 second-round draft pick. He immediately joined the team's top line alongside John Tavares and Kyle Okposo, which Vanek said later was the best line he ever played on. On 4 February 2014, Vanek confirmed that he had turned down a contract extension offer from the Islanders. The contract was reportedly for seven years and $50 million, with Vanek stating that the Islanders move to Barclays Center was one of his primary reasons for leaving the team.

On 5 March 2014, Vanek was dealt to the Montreal Canadiens in exchange for Sebastian Collberg and a second-round draft pick. On 19 March 2014, he scored his first three goals for the team – a hat trick in a game against the Colorado Avalanche that they went on to win 6–3. However, Vanek was noted for his lackluster performance during the 2014 Stanley Cup playoffs, including scoring just five even-strength points over 17 games. In late June, Canadiens General Manager Marc Bergevin announced that the team would not be re-signing Vanek, allowing him to become an unrestricted free agent.

=== Minnesota Wild ===
On 1 July 2014, Vanek signed a three-year, $19.5 million contract with the Minnesota Wild with a no-trade clause, turning down a three-year, $21 million offer to return to the Islanders. The signing reunited Vanek with former Sabres teammate Jason Pominville.

With the Wild up against the salary cap and Vanek having endured an unsuccessful stint with the Wild, Vanek's last year of his contract was bought-out by Minnesota on 24 June 2016.

=== Detroit Red Wings ===
On 1 July 2016, Vanek signed a one-year, $2.6 million contract with the Detroit Red Wings reuniting him with Co-Captain Steve Ott when a member with the Sabres.

=== Florida Panthers ===
With the Panthers looking to make a playoff push, on 1 March 2017, Vanek was traded to the Florida Panthers in exchange for Dylan McIlrath and a conditional third-round pick in the 2017 NHL entry draft. Vanek recorded 10 points in 20 games with Florida, but ultimately the Panthers did not qualify for the post-season, which was their goal at the time of the trade.

=== Vancouver Canucks and Columbus Blue Jackets ===
On 1 September 2017 Vanek signed a one-year, $2 million contract with the Vancouver Canucks. On 20 December 2017, Vanek recorded his 10th career hat trick in a loss to the Montreal Canadiens. On 26 February 2018, the day of the trade deadline, Vanek was traded to the Columbus Blue Jackets in exchange for Jussi Jokinen and Tyler Motte. He recorded his 11th career hat trick in the same season on 27 March 2018, in a game against the Edmonton Oilers.

=== Return to Detroit ===
On 1 July 2018, Vanek signed a one-year, $3 million contract for a second stint with the Red Wings. He would tally 16 goals and 20 assists during what would be his final NHL season.

== Personal life ==
Vanek and his wife Ashley have three sons. They live in Stillwater, Minnesota. His son, Blake, was drafted in the third round, 93rd overall, by the Ottawa Senators in the 2025 NHL entry draft.

On 21 July 2014, Vanek's name was listed in records seized from The Marina Restaurant & Bar, a Rochester, New York, facility suspected of running an illegal gambling ring. For his part, Vanek denied all wrongdoing, cooperated with authorities and was not charged with any crime.

== Career statistics ==
=== Regular season and playoffs ===
			Regular season					Playoffs
Season	Team	League	GP	G	A	Pts	PIM	GP	G	A	Pts	PIM
1999–00	Sioux Falls Stampede	USHL	35	15	18	33	12	3	0	1	1	8
2000–01	Sioux Falls Stampede	USHL	20	19	10	29	15	8	5	4	9	2
2001–02	Sioux Falls Stampede	USHL	53	46	45	91	54	3	0	0	0	9
2002–03	Minnesota Golden Gophers	WCHA	45	31	31	62	60	—	—	—	—	—
2003–04	Minnesota Golden Gophers	WCHA	38	26	25	51	72	—	—	—	—	—
2004–05	Rochester Americans	AHL	74	42	26	68	62	5	2	3	5	10
2005–06	Buffalo Sabres	NHL	81	25	23	48	72	10	2	0	2	6
2006–07	Buffalo Sabres	NHL	82	43	41	84	40	16	6	4	10	10
2007–08	Buffalo Sabres	NHL	82	36	28	64	64	—	—	—	—	—
2008–09	Buffalo Sabres	NHL	73	40	24	64	44	—	—	—	—	—
2009–10	Buffalo Sabres	NHL	71	28	25	53	42	3	2	1	3	2
2010–11	Buffalo Sabres	NHL	80	32	41	73	24	7	5	0	5	0
2011–12	Buffalo Sabres	NHL	78	26	35	61	52	—	—	—	—	—
2012–13	Graz 99ers	EBEL	11	5	10	15	4	—	—	—	—	—
2012–13	Buffalo Sabres	NHL	38	20	21	41	20	—	—	—	—	—
2013–14	Buffalo Sabres	NHL	13	4	5	9	4	—	—	—	—	—
2013–14	New York Islanders	NHL	47	17	27	44	34	—	—	—	—	—
2013–14	Montreal Canadiens	NHL	18	6	9	15	8	17	5	5	10	4
2014–15	Minnesota Wild	NHL	80	21	31	52	37	10	0	4	4	2
2015–16	Minnesota Wild	NHL	74	18	23	41	22	—	—	—	—	—
2016–17	Detroit Red Wings	NHL	48	15	23	38	16	—	—	—	—	—
2016–17	Florida Panthers	NHL	20	2	8	10	6	—	—	—	—	—
2017–18	Vancouver Canucks	NHL	61	17	24	41	28	—	—	—	—	—
2017–18	Columbus Blue Jackets	NHL	19	7	8	15	8	6	1	1	2	2
2018–19	Detroit Red Wings	NHL	64	16	20	36	26	—	—	—	—	—
NHL totals			1,029	373	416	789	547	69	21	15	36	26

Medal record

Ice hockey

Representing Austria

IIHF World Championships
Gold medal – first place	2008 Austria	Division I Group A

IIHF World U20 Championships
Gold medal – first place	2003 Slovenia	Division I Group B
Silver medal – second place	2002 Austria	Division I Group A

=== International ===
Year	Team	Event	GP	G	A	Pts	PIM
2002	Austria	WJC D1	5	5	6	11	2
2003	Austria	WJC D1	5	9	4	13	10
2004	Austria	WJC	6	3	1	4	37
2004	Austria	WC	6	2	5	7	0
2008	Austria	WC D1	5	5	5	10	6
2009	Austria	WC	6	1	3	4	2
2013	Austria	WC	7	4	2	6	2
2014	Austria	OLY	4	0	1	1	4
2016	Team Europe	WCH	6	0	1	1	2
Junior totals			16	17	11	28	49
Senior totals			34	12	17	29	16

== Awards and honours ==
Award	Year
College
All-USHL First Team	2001–02
All-WCHA Rookie Team	2002–03
All-WCHA Second Team	2002–03
All-NCAA All-Tournament Team	2003
All-WCHA Second Team	2003–04
AHCA West second-team All-American	2003–04
NHL
NHL YoungStars Game	2006–07
NHL Plus-Minus Award	2006–07
NHL Second All-Star team	2006–07
NHL All-Star Game	2009
International
IIHF Hall of Fame	2026

== See also ==
- List of NHL players who have signed offer sheets

Awards and achievements
Preceded by Brandon Bochenski	WCHA Rookie of the Year; 2002–03	Succeeded by Brady Murray
Preceded by Grant Potulny	NCAA Tournament Most Outstanding Player; 2003	Succeeded by Adam Berkhoel
Preceded by Daniel Paille	Buffalo Sabres first-round draft pick 2003	Succeeded by Drew Stafford
Preceded by Wade Redden and Michal Rozsíval	Winner of the NHL Plus-Minus Award; 2007	Succeeded by Pavel Datsyuk
Preceded by Jason Pominville	Buffalo Sabres captain with Steve Ott; 2013	Succeeded by Steve Ott
