= Brantford Blast =

Canadian senior ice hockey team

- City: Brantford, Ontario
- League: Allan Cup Hockey
- Founded: 2000
- Folded: 2022
- Home arena: Brantford Civic Centre
- Colours: Red, White, and Black
- General manager: Tony Falasca
- Head coach: Bryan Hamm

Franchise history
- 2000-2001: Brantford Prowl
- 2002-2022: Brantford Blast

Brantford Blast were a Canadian senior ice hockey team in the Ontario Hockey Association's Allan Cup Hockey, from Brantford, Ontario. The team was established in 2000, and played their games at the Brantford Civic Centre.

The Blast were the winners of the 2008 Allan Cup as Canadian Senior "AAA" Champions.

== History ==
In 2000, the Ontario Hockey Association allowed for the expansion of the first Brantford team since 1987 into Ontario's top tier of Senior hockey. The Brantford Prowl competed during the 2000-01 Southwestern Senior A Hockey League season and finished in fifth place with a record of 12 wins, 17 losses, and a tie. The team took 2001-02 off, but then re-emerged in 2002 as the Blast.

In 2002, Brantford rejoined the top tier of Ontario senior hockey this time known as the Brantford Blast. At the time, the city had the Brantford Golden Eagles in the Ontario Hockey Association, but had also lost teams, like the Brantford Alexanders of the Ontario Hockey League, who left in 1984 and the Brantford Smoke of the Colonial Hockey League, who left in 1998. The Blast would play their home games at the Brantford Civic Centre as well. The Blast have made it to the post season twice. In the 2005–06 season, when they won the league, but lost in the first round to the Dundas Real McCoys 4 games to 2. In the 2006–07 season, they placed third, defeating the Petrolia Squires 4 games to 3, and the Windsor St. Clair Saints 4 games to none to capture their first MLH Championship after a 4–3 win Monday March 12 in front of the home town crowd in Brantford.

Brantford won the J. Ross Robertson Cup for the league's playoffs championship in 2013 and 2014.

The Blast's was initially withdrawn from the Allan Cup Hockey for the 2022–23 season only. However, the application for the 2023-24 season was not submitted.

=== 2008 Allan Cup ===
The Blast finished the 2007–08 season in second place. They swept the Windsor St. Clair Saints 4-games-to-none in the Major League Hockey semi-final, but were defeated 4-games-to-2 to the Dundas Real McCoys.

The Brantford Blast were the host team of the 2008 Allan Cup, which was held in Brantford from April 14-April 19, 2008. This was also the 100th anniversary for the event, one of the reasons that the Blast wanted to host it.

The Brantford Blast became the first Ontario Hockey Association team since the Brantford Motts Clamatos, in 1987, to win the Allan Cup. As hosts of the 2008 Allan Cup, the Blast failed to win their league and were allowed to bypass the OHA Final against the Whitby Dunlops and the Renwick Cup against the Thunder Bay Hawks. After almost a months rest, the Blast competed at home for the Allan Cup and won the entire thing. After suffering their only loss of the tournament to the Shawinigan Xtreme 3–2 in the first game, the Blast defeated the Bentley Generals 5–3 to clinch second in their division. They defeated the Robertson Cup and EOSHL champion Whitby Dunlops in the quarter-final handily, 7–2. They then knocked off the Major League Hockey and Renwick Cup champion Dundas Real McCoys in the semi-final 3–2 in overtime. They met Bentley again in the final, who defeated the 2007 champions Lloydminster Border Kings and the Shawinigan Xtreme, and defeated them 3–1 to win the Canadian National Senior "AAA" crown.

== Season-by-season record ==
Note: GP = Games played, W = Wins, L = Losses, T = Ties, OTL = Overtime losses, Pts = Points, GF = Goals for, GA = Goals against

Season	GP	W	L	T	OTL	GF	GA	P	Results
2000-01	30	12	17	1	0	--	--	25	5th SWSHL
2001-02	Did Not Participate								
2002-03	31	9	21	1	0	130	189	20	5th OHA Sr. A
2003-04	32	16	11	4	1	162	141	37	5th OHA Sr. A
2004-05	34	8	25	1	0	136	195	17	6th MLH
2005-06	32	18	9	-	5	161	137	41	1st MLH
2006-07	30	15	13	-	2	156	142	32	3rd MLH
2007-08	30	21	9	-	0	131	100	42	2nd MLH
2008-09	28	13	15	-	0	127	120	26	5th MLH
2009-10	Did Not Participate								
2010-11	24	13	11	-	0	133	127	26	2nd MLH
2011-12	28	17	10	-	1	148	131	35	3rd ACH
2012-13	24	20	2	-	2	148	82	42	1st ACH
2013-14	24	16	7	-	1	126	80	33	3rd ACH
2014-15	24	16	6	-	2	136	98	34	2nd ACH, Lost league final
2015-16	24	17	5	-	2	105	86	51	2nd ACH, Lost league final
2016-17	24	12	10	-	2	112	111	51	4th ACH, Lost quarterfinal
2017-18	23	8	15	-	0	103	126	24	5th ACH
2018-19	Did Not Participate								
2019-20	20	11	8	-	1	105	108	31	3rd ACH, Playoffs cancelled during final with team trailing 2-0

== Awards ==
- 2004/2005 - All Star Centre - Paul Polillo
- 2004/2005 - Most Sportsmanlike - Tyler Pelton
- November 2005 - Player of the Month - Adriano Fiacconi
- December 2005 - Player of the Month - Tyler Pelton
- 2005-06 - League All-Star Game players - Tyler Pelton, Adriano Fiacconi, Brett Leggat
- 2005-06 - Season Champions
- 2005-06 - Best Team Goaltending
- 2006-07 - Major League Hockey Champions
- 2007-08 - Allan Cup Champions
- 2011-12 - Allan Cup Hockey - Robertson Cup Champions
- 2011-12 - Best Team Goaltending - Brett Leggat, Anthony Marshall, Ben Thomas
- 2011-12 - League Best player award - Mike Ruberto
- 2011-12 - League Leader Points - Mike Ruberto
- 2011-12 - League Best goaltender award - Brett Leggat
- 2011-12 - League Leader Goaltending - Brett Leggat
- 2012-13 - League Best goaltender award - Brett Leggat
- 2012-13 - League Leader Goltending - Brett Leggat
- 2013-14 - League Best goaltender award - Brett Leggat
- 2013-14 - League Most valuable player - Joel Prpic
- 2013-14 - League Leader Goaltending - Brett Leggat
- 2014-15 - League Best goaltender award - Anthony Marshall
- 2014-15 - League Leader Goltending - Anthony Marshall
- 2015-16 - League Best goaltender award - Brett Leggat
- 2015-16 - League Leader Goaltending - Brett Leggat
- 2017-18 - Most Sportsmanlike - Cameron Sault
- 2019-20 - Most Gentlemanly - Deron Cousens

== Notable alumni ==
- Tyrone Garner
- Brent Gretzky
- Grant Ledyard
- Jeff MacMillan
- Joel Prpic
- Steven Rice
- Jason Williams
