= 2008 Allan Cup =

Canadian senior ice hockey championship

The Allan Cup trophy

The 2008 Allan Cup was the Canadian championship of senior ice hockey, and the 100th year that the Allan Cup has been awarded. The 2008 tournament was hosted by the City of Brantford, Ontario, and the Brantford Blast of the Ontario Hockey Association's Major League Hockey. The tournament began on April 14, 2008, and concluded April 19, 2008.

== Information ==
Ontario was represented by two different teams in the 2008 Allan Cup, not including the hosts. The Whitby Dunlops represented the Ontario Hockey Federation as a whole by winning the Robertson Cup grand championship, played between the winners of Major League Hockey and the Eastern Ontario Senior Hockey League. The other representatives were the Dundas Real McCoys, who despite losing the Robertson Cup to the Dunlops received a second chance at the Allan Cup because they pushed through to the Greater Ontario championship, the Renwick Cup and defeated Hockey Northwestern Ontario's Thunder Bay Hawks. The reason for the second representative being awarded was due to a lack of a Maritime entry in the Senior "AAA" ranks for the season.

== Tournament ==
=== Round Robin ===
Allan Cup Round Robin
Division One
Rank	Team	League	Ticket	W-L-T	GF	GA
1	Dundas Real McCoys	MLH	Renwick Cup	1-0-1	9	6
2	Lloydminster Border Kings	WGHL	Man/Sask	1-1-0	6	8
3	Whitby Dunlops	EOSHL	Robertson Cup	0-1-1	7	8
Division Two
Rank	Team	League	Ticket	W-L-T	GF	GA
1	Shawinigan Xtreme	LCH	Quebec	2-0-0	5	3
2	Brantford Blast	MLH	Host	1-1-0	7	6
3	Bentley Generals	ChHL	McKenzie Cup	0-2-0	4	7

==== Results ====
Round Robin results
Game	Team	Score	Team	Score	Notes
1	Dundas	4	Whitby	4	OT Final - Shots: 47-31 WHI
2	Shawinigan	3	Brantford	2	Final - Shots: 40-30 BRA
3	Lloydminster	2	Dundas	5	Final - Shots: 32-29 LLO
4	Bentley	1	Shawinigan	2	Final - Shots: 43-23 BEN
5	Whitby	3	Lloydminster	4	Final - Shots: 39-32 WHI
6	Brantford	5	Bentley	3	Final - Shots: 37-34 BEN

=== Elimination round ===
Elimination results
Game	Team	Score	Team	Score	Notes
7 - QF	Bentley	5	Lloydminster	3	Final - Shots: 31-30 LLO
8 - QF	Whitby	2	Brantford	7	Final - Shots: 41-32 BRA
9 - SF	Bentley	6	Shawinigan	1	Final - Shots: 33-27 BEN
10 - SF	Brantford	3	Dundas	2	OT Final - Shots: 39-35 BRA

=== Final ===
Allan Cup final: Game / Team / Score / Team / Score / Notes; 11 - F / Brantford / 3 / Bentley / 1 / Final - Shots: 30-23 BEN
