= Ligue Centrale de Hockey =

- Sport: ice hockey
- Founded: N/A
- No. of teams: 10
- Country: Canada
- Most recent champion(s): N/A
- Official website: LCH official site (in French)

The LCH was a Senior AAA league that operated between 1978 and 2008 in Québec, Canada. It was a semi-pro league for ex-professional players and for young players coming out of major junior who had not yet found a spot on a professional team. The LCH also acted as a feeder league for the Ligue Nord-Américaine de Hockey (LNAH). The League used to be strictly amateur but in its last few years of existence it shifted from a senior league to a semi-pro format. Teams played for the Desjardins Cup named after the company that is one of the main sponsors of the LCH. The league champion would advance to the Canadian Senior AAA national championship(Allan Cup). The League took a hiatus for the 2008-09 season hoping to return for 2009-10 but never came back. Three of its teams went to play in the LNAH and two are still there (Rivière-du-Loup & Saguenay).

== Teams ==
The LCH had 10 teams in its last season

- BooMeRang de Charlevoix
- Précision de Pont-Rouge (Used to be le Grand Portneuf de Pont Rouge)
- 98.3 FM de Saguenay (Used to be le PolVin de Saguenay)
- X-Trême Bionest de Shawinigan
- Gilmyr de Montmagny
- CIMT de Rivière-du-Loup
- Poutrelles Delta de Sainte-Marie
- Voyageurs de Cowansville (New team, used to be in the folded LHSP (Ligue de Hockey Senior Promutuel)
- Turmel du Lac Mégantic (New team, used to be in the folded LHSP (Ligue de Hockey Senior Promutuel)
- CHOX-FM de La Pocatière (Taking the 2007-08 season off upon completion of new arena)
