= Cégep de Saint-Laurent =

Public college in Montreal, Quebec

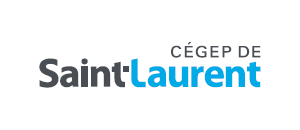
- Motto: Une institution qui a une âme
- Motto in English: An institution with a soul
- Type: CEGEP
- Established: 1968; 58 years ago
- Affiliations: ACCC, CCAA, Fédération Québécoise du Sport Étudiant (FQSE)
- Students: 5000
- Undergraduates: pre-university students; technical
- Location: 625, avenue Sainte-Croix; Montreal, Quebec; H4L 3X7; 45°30′44″N 73°40′20″W
- Campus: Urban
- Language: French
- Colours: Blue and Red
- Nickname: Patriotes (Pats)
- Website: www.cegepsl.qc.ca

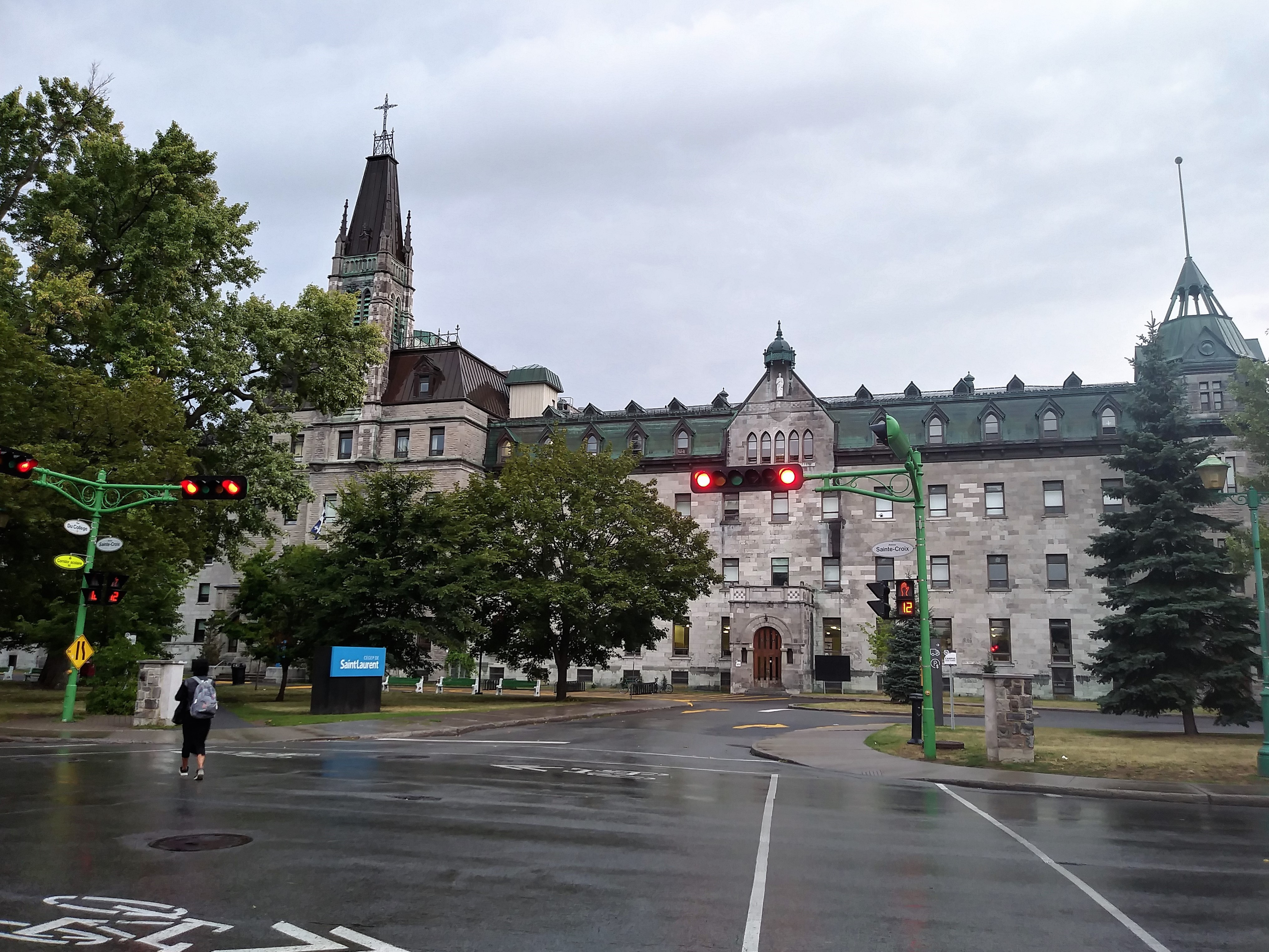
Main building of Cegep de Saint-Laurent

Cégep de Saint-Laurent (French pronunciation: [seʒɛp də sɛ̃ lɔʁɑ̃]) is a public French-language college located in the Saint-Laurent borough in Montreal, Quebec, Canada. It is located just south of the English-language Vanier College. Its best known alumnus is Kent Hughes.

== History ==
The college traces its origins to the merger of several institutions which became public ones in 1967, when the Quebec system of CEGEPs was created.

== Programs ==
The college offers two types of programs: pre-university and technical. The pre-university programs, which take two years to complete, cover the subject matters which roughly correspond to the additional year of high school given elsewhere in Canada in preparation for a chosen field in university. The technical programs, which take three years to complete, applies to students who wish to be career-ready; however, many students choose to pursue a university degree. In addition, the Continuing Education Centre offers a wide variety of credit courses and programs with flexible scheduling.

Pre-university programs:

- Drama arts
- Visual arts
- Cinema and communication
- Dance
- Languages
- Letters
- Music
- Science
  - Health science
  - Pure and applied science
  - Medical biology
- Social science

Usually, pre-university programs require four semesters (two years) to complete.

Double DEC programs:

- Science and visual arts
- Science and music
- Science and dance
- Science and letters
- Social science and visual arts
- Social science and dance
- Social science and music
- Social science and letters
- Music and letters

Usually, Double DEC programs, which are considered special pre-university programs, require six semesters (three years) to complete.

Technical/Career programs:

- Water sanitation technology
- Environment, health, and safety
- Nursing
- Wildlife management technology
- Community recreation technology
- Mechanical engineering technology
- Professional music and song technology
- Architecture technology
- Electronics technology

Usually, technical and career programs require six semesters (three years) to complete.

== Partnerships ==
Vanier College, which instructs students with general and technical programs, is affiliated with the Association of Canadian Community Colleges (ACCC), and Canadian Colleges Athletic Association (CCAA).

== Athletics ==
The college participates in the Canadian Colleges Athletic Association (CCAA) and its athletic teams are known as les Patriotes du cégep de Saint-Laurent, often shortened to Pats. The school maintains intercollegiate teams in men's ice hockey (Division I & II), women's ice hockey, men's and women's flag football, men's and women's soccer, and women's volleyball, men and woman's basket ball which compete in the Réseau du Sport Étudiant du Québec (RSEQ) Collégial.

== See also ==
- List of colleges in Quebec
- Higher education in Quebec
- St. Lawrence College, Ontario
