= Canadore College =

College in Ontario, Canada

Coordinates: 46°20′39.08″N 79°29′30.79″W

Canadore College of Applied Arts and Technology
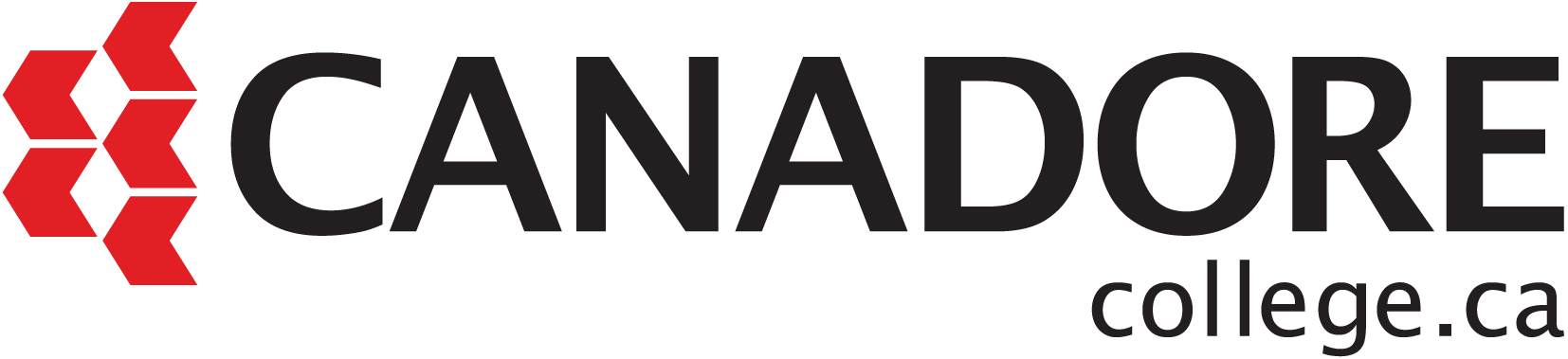
- Motto: Great Things Happen Here
- Type: Public College of Applied Arts and Technology
- Established: 1972
- Affiliations: CCAA, ACCC, AUCC, CBIE, CUP.
- Chair: Todd Wilcox
- President: George Burton
- Vice-president: Ahmed Obaide (Academic), Shawn Chorney (Strategic Infrastructure, Indigenous and Learner Services)
- Students: 6,000 (2025)
- Location: 100 College Drive, P.O. Box 5001, P1B 8K9, North Bay, Ontario, Canada
- Campus: Canadore College has three campuses in North Bay, Ontario: Aviation Technology Campus, Commerce Court Campus, and the Education Centre (Main Campus/College Drive Campus).
- Mascot: Panther
- Website: canadorecollege.ca

Canadore College is a public college of applied arts and technology located in North Bay, Ontario, Canada. It was founded in 1967 as a campus of Sudbury's Cambrian College, and became an independent institution in 1972. Canadore College has three campuses in North Bay.

== Programs ==
Canadore College offers more than 65 full-time post-secondary programs, focused in several key academic sectors: aviation technology; business and management; community justice and police studies; culinary arts; environmental studies and biotechnology; health, human care and wellness; indigenous studies; language, access and preparatory studies; media, design and dramatic arts; sport and recreation; and trades and technology. Part-time studies in business; general interest; geographic information systems; health sciences; hospitality; information technology; languages; law and justice; preparatory studies; recreation and leisure services; trades and technology; and transportation are also offered in the traditional classroom and/or online.

Following comments from North Bay City Councillor describing Canadore as a toxic workplace, Canadore president George Burton filed an ethics complaint. The investigation, in 2024, found no issue with the toxic workplace statement. Canadore had previously faced 2019 allegations from over 50 staff of being a toxic workplace. A subsequent third-party investigation was conducted in 2020 which Canadore refused to release publicly. Following Canadore's failure to release the report, and accounts of reprisal and psychological abuse, unions called for the suspension of Canadore administrators.

== Student life ==
=== Sport and wellness ===
Canadore athletes (Panthers) compete at the OCAA (Ontario Colleges Athletic Association) varsity level in men's and women's volleyball, and men's basketball. The men's and women's hockey and men's and women's indoor soccer teams are at the extramural level.

== Buildings and features ==
Canadore shares its main campus facilities with Nipissing University. Canadore College has three campuses in North Bay, Ontario: Aviation Technology Campus, Commerce Court Campus, and the Education Centre (Main Campus/College Drive Campus).

Canadore had a campus in Parry Sound, Ontario until 2026.

Through its affiliated institution, Canadore at Stanford, Canadore also extends its presence to the Greater Toronto Area with campuses in Brampton, Mississauga, and Scarborough

The Education Centre is situated on a 263-hectare (650-acre) wooded escarpment with over 26 km (16 mi) of wilderness trails.

In 2018, Canadore opened The Village, a new $20 million "health and wellness centre".

In 2022, Canadore and the Province of Ontario announced a joint project to build and staff an addictions treatment centre in North Bay. Following incomplete building renovations in 2024 the cancellation of the project was announced stating "Ontario Health lost confidence in Canadore’s ability to meet the operational and clinical requirements needed to open the 53 addiction recovery beds".

== Residences ==
Canadore College offers apartment-style residences, also referred to as Lower Residence. On September 9, 2023, a group of 50–100 Canadore international students, with no place to stay, erected a tent village. The tents were set up outside Canadore property which they were denied access to. Following the tent village being erected the college promised a solution within three business days.
