= Cup of coffee (sports idiom) =

North American sports idiom

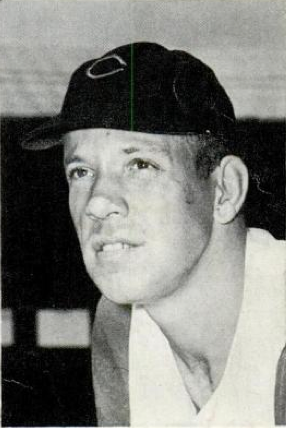
Baseball pitcher Joe Nuxhall made his debut at age 15 via a cup of coffee with the 1944 Cincinnati Reds.

A "cup of coffee" is a North American sports idiom for a short time spent by a minor league player at the major league level. The idea behind the term is that the player was only in the big leagues long enough to have a cup of coffee before being returned to the minors. The term originated in baseball and is extensively used in ice hockey, both of whose professional leagues (MLB and the NHL) utilize extensive farm systems; it is rarely used in basketball or American football since neither the NBA nor NFL have implemented a true farm system.

One example of how this term is used in a sentence was during the 1996 film The Fan, in which Robert De Niro's character, a middle-aged former pitcher, says, "I was in the bigs for a cup of coffee myself until my arm went south."

== Notable baseball cups of coffee ==
=== September call-ups ===
One variant of the cup of coffee is the September call-up, in which major-league clubs call up additional players from their minor-league farm teams late in the season. For many years, this occurred from September 1 through the end of the regular season (typically late September or early October). Before the 2020 season, active major-league rosters expanded from 25 players to 40; however, since 2020, rosters expand only from 26 to 28. Notable players who made their debuts with a late-season "cup of coffee" include:

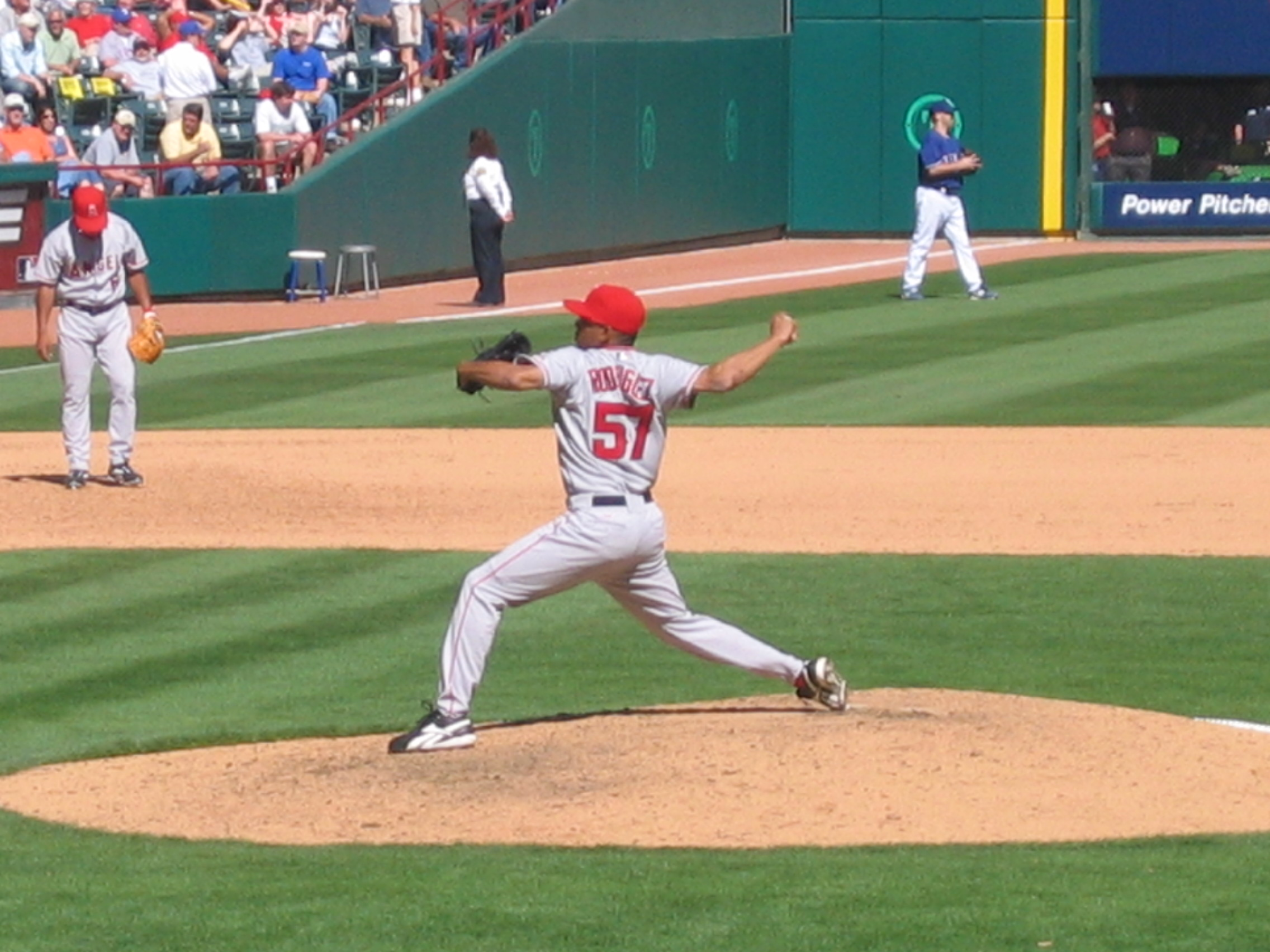
Francisco Rodríguez pitching for the Angels

- Shoeless Joe Jackson, who played five late-season games in 1908, five more in 1909, and 20 in 1910 before finally making the major leagues for good in 1911.
- Bumpus Jones, who made his major-league debut on the last day of the season, October 15, for the 1892 Cincinnati Reds. Jones threw a no-hitter. He pitched in 12 more games in 1893, then never appeared in another major-league game.
- Mike Piazza, who played 21 games for the 1992 Los Angeles Dodgers, and was eventually inducted to the National Baseball Hall of Fame.
- Francisco Rodríguez, who made his major-league debut by pitching 5 2/3 innings in September for the 2002 Anaheim Angels. Included on the Angels' postseason roster as a replacement for an injured player, he was the winning pitcher of five playoff games for Anaheim and helped them to victory in the 2002 World Series, all before he made an Opening Day roster.
- Ryne Sandberg who played 13 games with the 1981 Philadelphia Phillies, and is also a Hall of Fame inductee.

Players listed by Bill James as having had particularly impressive September call-up performances, and who had long careers, were Stan Musial, who hit .426 in 47 at bats for the 1941 St. Louis Cardinals; Fred Lynn, who hit .419 in 43 at bats for the 1974 Boston Red Sox; and J. D. Drew, who hit .417 with 5 home runs, a .972 slugging percentage, and a 1.436 on-base plus slugging percentage in 36 at bats for the 1998 St. Louis Cardinals.

=== One-game players ===
Another variant of the cup-of-coffee in baseball is a player who only appears in a single major-league game. Baseball-Reference.com maintains lists of players who have appeared in only one major-league game; as of April 2024, there are over 1,500 batters and over 700 pitchers listed. Some notable players include:

- Walter Alston. Alston struck out in his only career at-bat for the 1936 St. Louis Cardinals. He later managed the Dodgers for 23 years in Brooklyn and Los Angeles, winning seven pennants and four World Series championships. He entered the Baseball Hall of Fame in 1983.
- Tom Burr. Normally a pitcher, Burr played one inning in center field for the 1914 New York Yankees on April 21. He had no fielding chances and the game was won before he came to bat. In October 1918, Burr died in France while serving in World War I.
- Dutch Fehring. Fehring made a single appearance with the 1934 Chicago White Sox, in a road game against the New York Yankees at Yankee Stadium on July 25, 1934. He struck out in his sole at bat, but tagged out Lou Gehrig, attempting an inside-the-park home run, at the plate. Fehring went on become a longtime college coach, most notably at Stanford University, manager of the United States national baseball team, and president of the United States Baseball Federation.
- Eddie Gaedel. Gaedel, who was three feet, seven inches tall, was put on the roster of the 1951 St. Louis Browns by maverick owner Bill Veeck and sent into a game as a pinch-hitter on August 19. His uniform number was 1/8. The promotional stunt ended when pitcher Bob Cain, throwing at the smallest strike zone of all time, walked Gaedel on four pitches. Major League Baseball voided Gaedel's contract the next day and he never appeared in a game again.

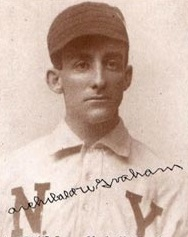
Outfielder Moonlight Graham's cup of coffee with the 1905 New York Giants was made famous by Field of Dreams.

- Moonlight Graham. Graham was an outfielder who played two innings of one game on defense for the New York Giants in the 1905 season, neither making a putout nor getting a chance to bat. He would leave baseball and enjoy a long career as a doctor in Chisholm, Minnesota. His story was made famous when author W.P. Kinsella included it in his novel Shoeless Joe, which was then adapted into the hit movie Field of Dreams. (Graham's story is reported incorrectly in the movie and in other sources. Contrary to the film's assertion that Graham only played one half-inning, the Society for American Baseball Research discovered that he actually played two innings. Also, there was at least one base hit to the outfield while Graham was in the game, so he might have gotten the chance to field a ball in play.)
- Gary Hargis. Normally an infielder, Hargis made his lone MLB appearance as a pinch runner in an extra-innings game for the 1979 Pittsburgh Pirates on the next-to-last day of the season, September 29.
- John LeRoy. LeRoy pitched one game with the Atlanta Braves on September 26, 1997, throwing two scoreless innings, giving up one hit and three walks while striking out three batters and being credited as the winning pitcher against the New York Mets. On November 18, 1997, he was selected by the Tampa Bay Devil Rays in the expansion draft. LeRoy never played for the Devil Rays, and died on June 25, 2001, in Sioux City, Iowa after suffering a heart attack and brain aneurysm.
- John Paciorek. Paciorek played one game with the 1963 Houston Colt .45s on the last day of the season. He came to the plate five times, and did the following: two walks, three singles, three RBI, four runs scored, career batting average and on-base-percentage of 1.000. Of the 27 players in MLB history with batting averages of 1.000, Paciorek is the only one with three at-bats.
- Fred Van Dusen. Van Dusen was a September call-up for the Philadelphia Phillies in 1955. In his first plate appearance as a pinch-hitter, he was hit by the third pitch he saw. He never made it back to the majors. Van Dusen is the only player to be hit by a pitch in his only major-league plate appearance, and to never play the field.
- Ron Wright. Wright appeared in one game for the 2002 Seattle Mariners. In that game he accounted for six outs by striking out, hitting into a double play, and hitting into a triple play.
- Larry Yount. Yount, the brother of Hall of Famer Robin Yount, appeared in a game without ever actively participating in a game. He was summoned from the bullpen to pitch the top of the ninth inning for the Houston Astros on September 15, 1971. Yount hurt his elbow while warming up and was removed from the game before ever throwing a pitch. He never made it back to the major leagues. By official rule, pitchers who leave the game due to injury after being announced are credited with a game appearance; thus Yount is listed as playing in one game despite never actually doing so.

=== Other circumstances ===
Other players, who had cup-of-coffee major-league appearances under unusual circumstances, include:

- St. Paul Saints of 1884. The Union Association began operation in 1884, and is listed in many sources as a third major league. However, the league faced multiple problems, including an uneven distribution of talent (the league champion St. Louis Maroons went 94–19) and poor attendance in a country that suddenly was oversaturated with baseball teams. As the season wore on, teams began to fold, and the league scrounged around for replacements. The last of these replacements were the minor-league Saints (Apostles), an entire team that got a cup of coffee when they were invited into the Union Association. They played exactly nine games, all on the road, at the end of the season. The Saints went 2–6–1. Three other UA teams played 25 games or less, with the Saints playing the fewest. The Union Association folded in January 1885. (Although the league is conventionally listed as a major league, this status has been questioned by a number of modern baseball historians, most notably Bill James in The Bill James Historical Baseball Abstract. James and other baseball historians have noted the league's extreme instability and lack of major-league talent; James has also found that the contemporary Baseball Guides didn't consider the Union Association to be a major league.)

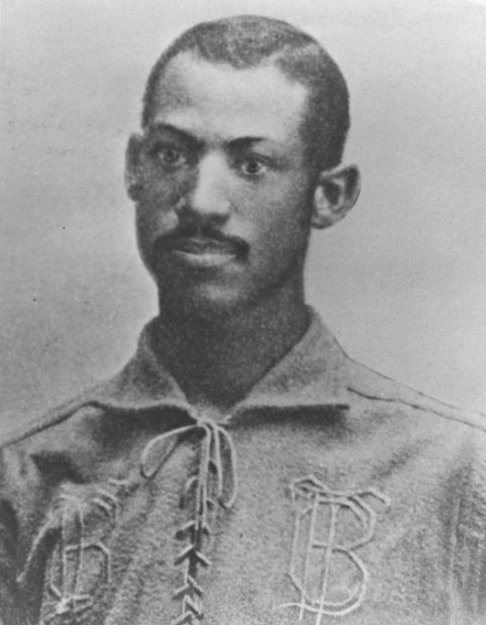
Moses Fleetwood Walker, c. 1884

- Moses Fleetwood Walker and Welday Walker. Moses Walker played 42 games for the 1884 Toledo Blue Stockings. His brother Welday also played for Toledo that year, debuting after Moses and playing for six games. The Walker brothers are the first known black major league baseball players, predating Jackie Robinson by 63 years. The Toledo franchise folded after 1884 and player boycotts (Cap Anson being a ringleader) upheld baseball's color barrier. (Further research indicates that William Edward White, who played one game in 1879, preceded the Walkers as a black major-league ballplayer, although White's ethnicity can't be definitely determined and likely was not known to baseball authorities.)
- 1912 Detroit Tigers replacement team. When Ty Cobb was suspended for fighting a fan in the stands, 16 members of the Tigers voted to go on strike in support of Cobb. Unable to field a team for their May 18 game in Philadelphia, the Tigers scrounged up nine replacement players from around the city. Philadelphia drubbed the replacement Tigers by a score of 24–2. Pitcher Allan Travers went the whole game for Detroit, giving up 24 runs (a modern-day record), 14 of which were earned. Of the nine replacement players, the only one to ever appear in a major-league game again was Billy Maharg, who made it back for one more game in 1916 (and later was one of the fixers behind the Black Sox Scandal). The real Tigers, after being threatened by American League president Ban Johnson with indefinite bans, came back for their next game.
- Joe Nuxhall. Nuxhall appeared in one game for the 1944 Cincinnati Reds at the age of 15, during a time when the manpower requirements of World War II were making it more challenging for professional baseball teams to fill out their rosters. Nuxhall is the youngest player ever to appear in a major-league baseball game. He came back to the majors in 1952 and had a 14-year playing career, and later spent many years as a member of the Reds broadcast team.
- Adam Greenberg. Greenberg was a Chicago Cubs farmhand who got called up in 2005. In his major-league debut, on July 9, Greenberg was hit in the head with the first pitch he ever saw in the majors. Seven years later, and after an online publicity campaign on his behalf, Greenberg got another at-bat as a member of the Miami Marlins. He struck out swinging.
- Mark Kiger. Kiger is the only player to have only appeared in the major-league postseason but never in a regular-season game. He made his debut with the Oakland Athletics during the 2006 American League Championship Series and played in two games at second base as a defensive replacement; he did not have a plate appearance. Adalberto Mondesí made his debut in the 2015 World Series, but later made his regular-season debut on July 26, 2016.

== In ice hockey ==
Players who play only a few games in the National Hockey League and spend the rest of their careers in the American Hockey League or other professional leagues are common in professional hockey.

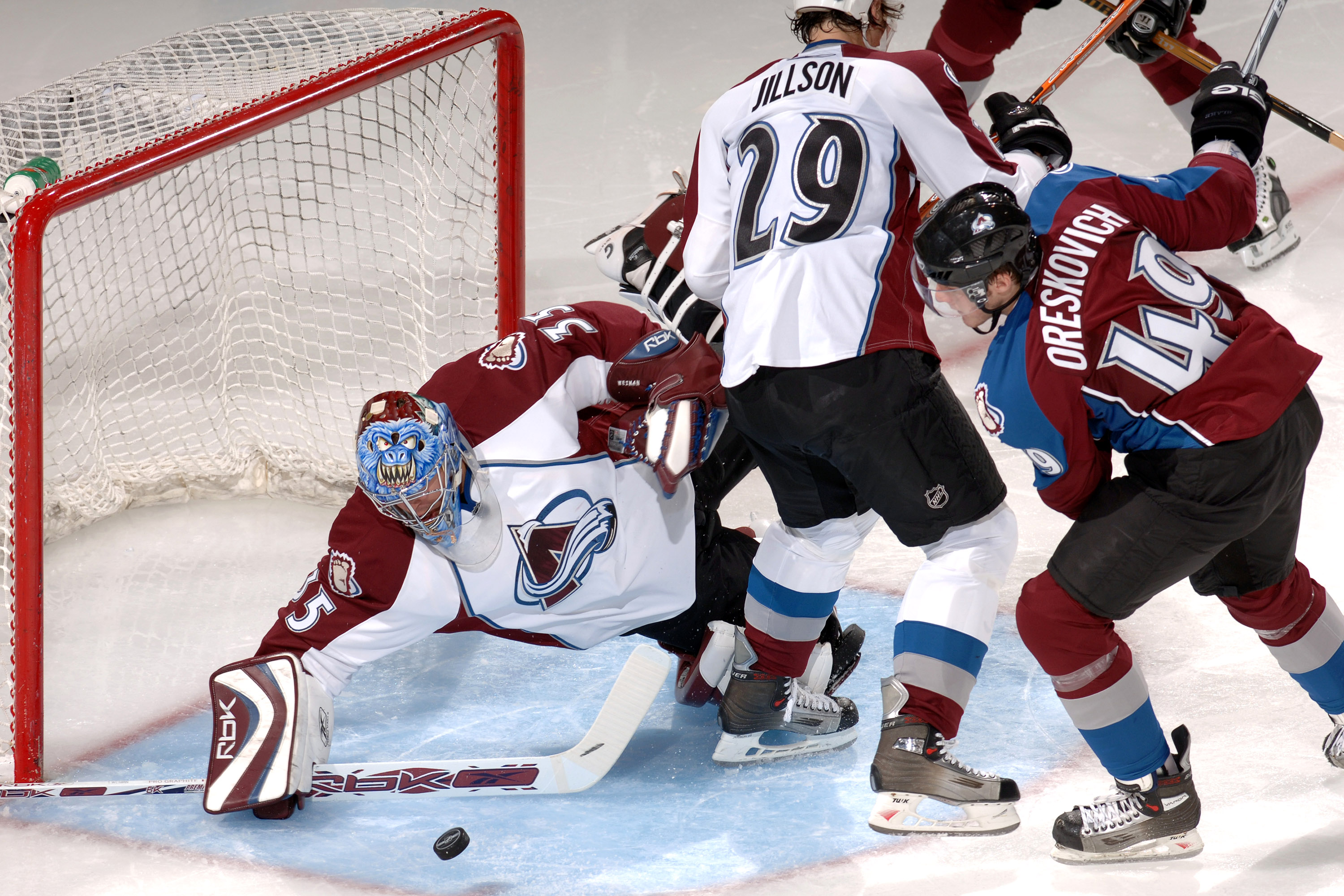
Goaltender Tyler Weiman's cup-of-coffee with the 2007–08 Colorado Avalanche included 16 minutes of playing time.

A special case unique to the NHL is that of the Emergency Backup Goaltender (EBUG). NHL rules dictate that a team carry at least two goaltenders in every game; however, there are sometimes circumstances (such as a short-notice trade or a mid-game injury) when a team only has one goaltender on the roster and does not have time to call up another from the AHL. In such a case, any goaltender 22 years of age or older can be signed as a free agent to a short-term contract to fill the second goaltender position until a more permanent solution can be found. Since the other goaltender is certain to play the game in question and is not likely to be injured during game play, the backup goaltender is likely never to set foot on the ice during game play. Thus, players with little to no experience can sometimes have a short cup of coffee in the NHL.

David Ayres is perhaps the most famous EBUG to play a game in the NHL, and the first to be credited with a win in the NHL. A Canadian former professional ice hockey goaltender and an occasional Zamboni driver, Ayres stepped in to play goalie for the Carolina Hurricanes in their game against the Toronto Maple Leafs on February 22, 2020.

Video technician Ryan Vinz is another such example; he was pulled out of the stands to fill the position for one game for the Buffalo Sabres in 2014 despite not having played goalie since high school. This position is typically held by an older, retired goaltender (Dwayne Roloson, Artūrs Irbe and Bob Essensa, for instance, served in those positions for games in the 2014–15 NHL season).

== See also ==
- One-hit wonder
- Phantom ballplayer
