= Ice hockey contract =

The following are the types of hockey contracts that players may be signed to when they play professional ice hockey.

== NHL contracts ==
=== Two-way contract ===
A two-way contract is a professional sports contract which stipulates that an athlete's salary is dependent upon the league in which the athlete is assigned to play.

=== One-way contract ===
A one-way contract means that the player is paid the same amount of money regardless of whether he plays in the National Hockey League (NHL) or American Hockey League (AHL).

== Standard player contract ==
=== AHL/ECHL ===
This is what a player signs to lay out the terms of their playing status and salary. This is not transferable to the NHL and would require the player to sign a new contract with the NHL team.

== Professional tryout ==
A Professional tryout (PTO) contract exists in the AHL and NHL. In the AHL, this type of contract is limited to 25 games. Teams may sign players to multiple PTOs at any time during the season, provided that after the completion of the PTO, the player has the right to sign a regular AHL contract or a PTO with another AHL team.

== Amateur tryout ==
An Amateur tryout (ATO) contract exists in the NHL, the AHL and the ECHL. This type of contract is for players who are leaving college and attempting to turn professional, are done with college or are graduating from the junior leagues. An ATO is a very common practice near the end of the professional seasons as they go deeper into the year than college or junior schedules. In the NHL, an ATO may only be used for one day on an emergency basis, with no pay or compensation for skaters, per Exhibit 17 of the NHL–NHLPA Collective Bargaining Agreement (CBA). ATOs in the NHL are typically only used for goaltenders since, in practice, teams always retain more than the needed 18 skaters on their NHL rosters, making it highly likely any skater who becomes unavailable for a game on short notice can be replaced by another player who otherwise would have been a "healthy scratch".

For goaltenders and skaters, the ATO may only be used according to section 13-13(m)(ii) of the NHL-NHLPA CBA, when Emergency conditions shall be established when the playing strength of the Loaning Club, by reason of incapacitating injury or illness or by League suspension to its Players is reduced below the level of two (2) goalkeepers, six (6) defensemen and twelve (12) forwards. Proof of the existence of the emergency conditions including the incapacity shall be furnished to the Commissioner of the League upon request made by him.

Every team in the League is required to maintain a list of emergency goaltenders who reside in their respective club's home market. These goaltenders can be signed when needed by either home or visiting teams.

=== Recent ATOs ===
On December 16, 2010, the Phoenix Coyotes signed Tom Fenton to a one-game amateur contract.

Another use of an ATO was when the Minnesota Wild signed 51-year-old Paul Deutsch on November 23, 2011. Deutsch was signed because the Wild were unsure their minor league goaltender, Matt Hackett, would arrive in time for the game. Deutsch wore number 33 and only participated in warm ups, as Hackett arrived just before the game started. Deutsch said the last time that he played organized hockey was in 1978 as a defenseman on his junior varsity high school hockey team. He first played goaltender at age 37 in a "beer league" in Minnesota.

On March 28, 2012, former University of Michigan goaltender Shawn Hunwick was signed to an ATO by the Columbus Blue Jackets after starting goaltender Steve Mason was injured during practice.

On February 28, 2014, the Buffalo Sabres signed their former video scout, Ryan Vinz, to an ATO after starting goaltender Ryan Miller was traded before warm-ups.

On February 15, 2016, the Arizona Coyotes signed emergency goaltender Nathan Schoenfeld, the son of former Coyotes coach and New York Rangers senior vice-president Jim Schoenfeld, to an ATO after backup goaltender Anders Lindbäck was injured in an off-ice activity before warmups.

On December 3, 2016, the Chicago Blackhawks signed emergency goaltender Eric Semborski, a former Temple University club goaltender, to an ATO after starting goaltender Corey Crawford presented acute appendicitis and underwent an appendectomy before a game in Philadelphia.

On December 31, 2016, the Carolina Hurricanes signed emergency goaltender Jorge Alves, who serves as the team's equipment manager, to an ATO after goalie Eddie Läck came down with food poisoning hours before face off for the game in Tampa Bay. Alves replaced starting goalie Cam Ward in net with 7.6 seconds remaining in the game and a faceoff at the other end of the rink, after the Lightning were called for icing the puck.

On March 29, 2018, Chicago Blackhawks signed emergency goalie Scott Foster, a former Western Michigan University goalie, to an ATO after Anton Forsberg injured himself playing soccer during warm up. During that night's game against the Winnipeg Jets, the starting goaltender Collin Delia (who also made his NHL debut that night) was injured early in the third period, and Scott Foster played, becoming the first emergency backup goaltender to be forced to play in the NHL due to injuries. He wore #90 and stopped all seven shots he faced in 14:01 ice time, including one powerplay shot to kill a one-minute power play, and was named the first star of the game.

On April 12, 2018, the San Jose Barracuda signed goaltender Nick Cafreli to an ATO after the San Jose Sharks recalled Antoine Bibeau for an out-of-town playoff game.

On November 14, 2018, the Washington Capitals signed goaltender Gavin McHale to an ATO after Braden Holtby sustained an upper body injury.

On February 22, 2020, the Carolina Hurricanes signed goaltender David Ayres to an ATO after both of the Carolina Hurricanes' goaltenders, James Reimer and Petr Mrázek, were injured during a game against the Maple Leafs.

On October 10, 2021, the Toronto Maple Leafs signed goaltender Alex Bishop to an ATO after Petr Mrázek sustained a lower body injury.

On January 28, 2023, the Edmonton Oilers signed goaltender Matt Berlin of the University of Alberta Golden Bears to an ATO on an emergency basis, after regular goaltender Stuart Skinner was pulled from the lineup before game time due to illness. Berlin served as the backup to Jack Campbell and entered the game for the final 2 minutes in the Oilers' 7-3 win over the Chicago Blackhawks. Berlin made one save on one shot.

On April 8, 2023, the Toronto Maple Leafs signed goaltender Jett Alexander to an ATO. He played 70 seconds at the end of their game against Montreal that day.

On April 12, 2023, the Toronto Maple Leafs signed Mathias Onuska to an ATO as a back up goaltender as Ilya Samsonov and Matt Murray were both injured and unable to play. He plays for the Windsor Spitfires currently.

On December 8, 2024, the Seattle Kraken signed goaltender Michael Matyas to an ATO to back up Philipp Grubauer after Joey Daccord was ruled out for illness earlier that day.

All of the goaltenders listed above served as backups to the team's remaining available goaltender. As of the 2022–23 season, only Scott Foster, Jorge Alves, David Ayres, Matt Berlin, and Jett Alexander have actually played in an NHL game. Ayres entered his game in the second period following an injury to goaltender Petr Mrázek and became the first emergency goaltender to record a win in NHL history.
