= Eric Semborski =

American ice hockey player

- Born: June 1, 1993 (age 33) Bloomsburg, Pennsylvania, U.S.
- Height: 6 ft 0 in (183 cm)
- Weight: 161 lb (73 kg; 11 st 7 lb)
- Position: Goaltender
- Caught: Left
- Played for: Temple Owls
- Playing career: 2016–2017

Eric Semborski (born June 1, 1993) is an American ice hockey player who served as an emergency goaltender for the Chicago Blackhawks and Philadelphia Flyers during the 2016–17 NHL season. He was substituted onto the ice, but the move was disallowed by the referee because the primary goalie was not injured.

== Biography ==
Semborski also served as an emergency backup goalie for the Blackhawks on December 3, 2016 when Corey Crawford needed an emergency appendectomy. Semborski dressed for the game and sat on the Blackhawks' bench but did not make an actual appearance in the game itself. The Blackhawks later thanked Semborski by gifting him a custom goalie mask, personalized Topps trading card, and a brief video tribute at the United Center.

== See also ==
- David Ayres – who in 2020 became the first emergency goalie to record an NHL win
- Scott Foster – emergency goalie who played 14 minutes in relief for the Chicago Blackhawks on March 29, 2018
- Jorge Alves – Carolina Hurricanes equipment manager who played as emergency goalie for his team on December 31, 2016
- Tom Hodges – Backup goalie and life insurance salesman who played for the Anaheim Ducks on April 30, 2022
