= Ryan Vinz =

American video technician and ice hockey player/coach

- Born: August 30, 1985 (age 41) Lancaster, New York, U.S.
- Height: 5 ft 7 in (170 cm)
- Weight: 154 lb (70 kg; 11 st 0 lb)
- Position: Goaltender
- Caught: Left
- NHL draft: Undrafted
- Playing career: 2014–2014

Ryan Vinz (born August 30, 1985) is an American video technician, best known for his one-game "cup of coffee" on the active roster of the Buffalo Sabres of the National Hockey League (NHL). He also served as a goaltending coach for the Buffalo Beauts of the Premier Hockey Federation.

== Background ==
Originally from Lancaster, New York, Vinz last played hockey at a competitive level at Lancaster High School. Vinz attended Clarkson University and attempted to make Clarkson's ice hockey team as a walk-on but failed to make the cut; he spent most of his time as that team's video coordinator. He graduated in 2007 with a degree in communications.

After graduation, the Sabres hired Vinz to serve as a member of the team's scouting department. He was eventually transferred to HarborCenter (a building project managed by Sabres owner Terrence Pegula) as the project's technology director.

== One-game NHL career ==
On February 28, 2014, the Sabres traded starting goaltender Ryan Miller and captain Steve Ott to the St. Louis Blues in exchange for goaltender Jaroslav Halak and two other players. The trade occurred less than two hours before Miller was to play that night's game against the San Jose Sharks. Although the team had backup Jhonas Enroth ready to play, the team by league rules needed a player on the roster to back up Enroth. The team did not have enough time to activate Halak or to call up third-string goalie Matt Hackett from the Rochester Americans.

The Sabres had used two other backup goaltenders in practices a few days prior because of Miller and Enroth's participation in the Olympics, but were also unable to use either of them, since both were under 22 years old and would have had to enter the NHL Draft (something that Vinz, age 28 at the time, was exempt from having to do). The team then found Vinz, who happened to be attending the game that night with his brother, and signed him to an emergency one-day contract. The term of the contract was a one-day unpaid contract, but he was allowed to keep the jersey and game puck.

Vinz wore number 35 with the Sabres in his lone game and did not see any playing time in the game, which the Sabres won 4-2. He became the ninth player in Sabres history to dress for a regular-season game but never take the ice for the team (Halak would become the tenth a few days later). Vinz was one of nine goaltenders to dress for the Sabres during the 2013-14 season, an NHL record.

As of December 2018, Vinz was still on the HarborCenter payroll and was still occasionally being used as a practice goalie.

== See also ==
- David Ayres
- Scott Foster
