= Olie Sundström =

Swedish ice hockey player

- Born: April 24, 1968 (age 58) Änge, Sweden
- Height: 5 ft 11 in (180 cm)
- Weight: 176 lb (80 kg; 12 st 8 lb)
- Position: Goaltender
- Caught: Left
- Played for: 2Bun; Iserlohner EC; AHL; Providence Bruins; ECHL; Columbus Chill; Erie Panthers; Johnstown Chiefs; Nashville Knights; New Orleans Brass; Wheeling Nailers; IHL; Cleveland Lumberjacks; SEL; Leksands IF; UHL; B.C. Icemen; Mohawk Valley Prowlers; New Haven Knights; Port Huron Beacons; WCHL; Anchorage Aces
- NHL draft: undrafted
- Playing career: 1986–2010

Olow "Olie" Sundström (born April 24, 1968) is a retired professional Swedish ice hockey goaltender.

== Career ==
=== Elitserien ===
Sundström spent the first six years of his career playing for the Elitserien team Leksands IF. As a backup, Sundström never appeared in more than nine games during his first four seasons with the team. Sundström assumed the starting duties of Leksands for the 1990–91 SEL season, appearing in 20 of the team's 22 games. After the 1991–92 SEL season, where Sundström again appeared in 20 of the team's 22 games, he moved onto the ECHL.

=== North America ===
Sundström spent the majority of his next nine season in North America, primarily in the ECHL. He split time with the Columbus Chill and Nashville Knights in his rookie season, going a combined 12-10-0 with an .859 save percentage.

Sundström spent his two seasons in the International Hockey League as a member of the Cleveland Lumberjacks. Sundström handled starting the starting duties during the 1993–94 season, appearing in 46 games and going 20-19-4. The following season, he appeared in 23 games, splitting time with Patrick Lalime and Philippe DeRouville, who at the time were both Pittsburgh Penguins goaltending prospects.

Sundström returned to the ECHL in 1995, making stops in Erie, Johnstown, and Wheeling before being recalled by the Providence Bruins in 1998. Sundström spent the next five seasons playing in the low-level minors, primarily in the United Hockey League and the West Coast Hockey League with a brief stop in Europe with Iserlohn Roosters of the 2nd tier Bundesliga.

=== Return To Europe ===
Sundström returned to Europe in 2003, playing in Sweden's Allsvenskan until 2007. He briefly returned to professional hockey at age 41 to play for Uppsala Hockey, a Swedish Division 2 team.

== Scoring A Goal ==
As a member of the Erie Panthers, Sundström became the second goaltender in ECHL history to score a goal on an empty net. Sundström accomplished on December 15, 1995 in a game versus the Wheeling Nailers. With less than two minutes remaining, Sundström launched the puck the length of the ice into the Nailers' empty net. Sundström accomplished the feat almost nine months after Hampton Roads' goaltender Corwin Saurdiff recorded the first goal by a goaltender in ECHL history. Saurdiff scored his goal on March 18, 1995 in a game vs the Charlotte Checkers.

Although scoring a goal is rare, two more ECHL goaltenders also accomplished the same feat during the 1995-96 ECHL season. South Carolina Stingrays goaltender Sean Gauthier scored a goal on December 19, 1995 (four days after Sundström scored his goal), and ECHL Hall Of Fame goaltender Nick Vitucci was credited with a goal on March 6, 1996 as a member of the Charlotte Checkers.
