= Scott Foster (ice hockey) =

Canadian accountant and ice hockey player

- Born: January 17, 1982 (age 44) Sarnia, Ontario, Canada
- Height: 6 ft 0 in (183 cm)
- Weight: 185 lb (84 kg; 13 st 3 lb)
- Position: Goaltender
- Caught: Left
- Played for: Chicago Blackhawks
- NHL draft: Undrafted
- Playing career: 2018–2018

Scott Foster (born January 17, 1982) is a Canadian accountant and amateur ice hockey goaltender. He appeared in one game for the Chicago Blackhawks of the National Hockey League (NHL) near the end of the 2017–18 season as an emergency goaltender following injuries to the team's starting and backup goaltenders.

== Playing career ==
=== College ===
Foster played junior hockey with the Petrolia Jets of the Western Ontario Hockey League in the 2001–02 season. He then moved on to play for Western Michigan University's hockey team in the 2002–03, 2003–04, and 2005–06 Central Collegiate Hockey Association seasons. He played in tandem with Mike Mantua in 2002–03, playing 21 games to Mantua's 26 and recording a 7–8–2 record with a .868 save percentage. His next year was more successful as he served as the team's starting goaltender, playing 33 games and recording an .881 percentage. His final stint with the team was less successful, as he played just one game in 2005–06, allowing three goals on seven shots in just one period of play.

=== Chicago Blackhawks ===
Foster was signed by the Chicago Blackhawks to an amateur tryout contract on the eve of their March 29, 2018, game against the Winnipeg Jets when the presumed starter Anton Forsberg was sidelined by injury. Forsberg himself had become the Blackhawks starting goaltender after Corey Crawford suffered a season-ending concussion. Foster had gone to 15 games as an emergency goaltender prior to this game, but never dressed. Serving as the Blackhawks' emergency backup goaltender for the game, Foster was not expected to play, considering his lack of high-level experience and the fact that only one goaltender of his kind had suited up for NHL action since 2010: Jorge Alves, who made his seven-second Carolina Hurricanes debut at the end of a game in December 2016. By contrast, Collin Delia, whom the Blackhawks started for the game (and who was also making his NHL debut that night), had spent the balance of the season in the Blackhawks' minor league system, having been called up to backup Forsberg following Crawford's concussion.

However, before the mid-way mark of the third period, Delia suffered an apparent lower-body injury, forcing Foster into NHL action for his debut. He saved all seven shots he faced in about 14 minutes of play, becoming the first emergency goaltender to ever stop a shot, and preserving a 6–2 Blackhawks win. Although Delia was credited with the win, Foster was named the game's first star. Asked about his performance following his NHL debut, Foster quipped, "I think I'm just hitting my prime." Assuming Foster does not play again in the NHL, he is one of 18 players since 1982 to record a perfect 1.000 save percentage in the league.

For the game Foster received "just beer league glory", he said. He kept his game-worn jersey and game puck but no other compensation; under the terms of the NHL collective bargaining agreement, players signed to amateur tryout contracts, as Foster was, are unpaid for their services.

Foster appeared at the 2018 NHL Award Ceremony, where he and Jim Belushi presented the Vezina Trophy to Pekka Rinne. Previously, he was voted the "Best NHL First" at the Blackhawks Fan Choice Awards.

During the 2018–19 season, Foster was asked to be an occasional second goalie for the Blackhawks optional morning skate.

== Personal life ==
Foster lives in Oak Park, Illinois, and as of 2018 works as an accountant with Golub Capital. He was previously with Aurora Investment Management. He plays for two beer league hockey teams as a goaltender. After his turn in the NHL, the United States Hockey League’s Chicago Steel offered to hire him as their "emergency accountant" and hoped to host him at their final home game to conduct the ceremonial puck drop. Foster avoided the spotlight in the following months, preferring to "prioritize his family and work following his NHL stint", even as interview requests came from as far away as Turkey. However, he eventually acquiesced and agreed to be interviewed by ESPN in April 2019.

== Career statistics ==
=== Regular season and playoffs ===
			Regular season										Playoffs
Season	Team	League	GP	W	L	T	OTL	MIN	GA	SO	GAA	SV%	GP	W	L	MIN	GA	SO	GAA	SV%
2000–01	Petrolia Jets	WOHL	28	18	10	0	—	1667	63	2	2.27	.928	—	—	—	—	—	—	—	—
2001–02	Petrolia Jets	WOHL	32	18	12	0	—	1810	96	3	3.18	.902	—	—	—	—	—	—	—	—
2002–03	Western Michigan University	CCHA	21	7	8	2	—	1036	65	0	3.77	.868	—	—	—	—	—	—	—	—
2003–04	Western Michigan University	CCHA	33	13	14	4	—	1890	102	0	3.24	.881	—	—	—	—	—	—	—	—
2005–06	Western Michigan University	CCHA	1	0	1	0	—	20	3	0	9.00	.571	—	—	—	—	—	—	—	—
2017–18	Chicago Blackhawks	NHL	1	0	0	—	0	14	0	0	0.00	1.000	—	—	—	—	—	—	—	—
NHL totals			1	0	0	—	0	14	0	0	0.00	1.000	—	—	—	—	—	—	—	—

== See also ==
- David Ayres – Zamboni driver and Carolina Hurricanes emergency goalie who appeared in a 2020 game, becoming the first emergency goalie to record a win in an NHL game
- Tom Hodges – Backup goalie and life insurance salesman who played for the Anaheim Ducks on April 30, 2022
- Lester Patrick – former New York Rangers coach who, at age 44, played in the 1928 Stanley Cup Finals for the team as an emergency goalie
- Eric Semborski – Philadelphia Flyers emergency goalie, whose substitution was attempted in 2017, but was removed by the referee as the primary goalie was not injured
- Jerry Toppazzini – Boston Bruins right winger, who in 1960 was the last position player to substitute as a goalie
- Ryan Vinz – Buffalo Sabres video technician and practice goalie who served as an emergency goalie in 2014 but did not play
- List of players who played only one game in the NHL
