= Tom Hodges (ice hockey) =

British-American ice hockey player (born 1994)

- Born: July 25, 1994 (age 32) Shrewsbury, England, UK
- Height: 5 ft 10 in (178 cm)
- Weight: 170 lb (77 kg; 12 st 2 lb)
- Position: Goaltender
- Caught: Left
- Played for: Anaheim Ducks
- NHL draft: Undrafted
- Playing career: 2016–2016; 2022

Thomas Hodges (born July 25, 1994) is an American life insurance salesman and amateur ice hockey player. He appeared for the Anaheim Ducks of the National Hockey League (NHL) in the team's final game of the 2021–22 season as an emergency goaltender following injuries to both John Gibson and Anthony Stolarz.

== Early life ==
Hodges was born in Shrewsbury, United Kingdom, but emigrated to the Dallas-Fort Worth metroplex, and grew up playing youth ice hockey. Hodges was forced to abandon his aspirations of playing in the National Hockey League after taking an errant puck to the head at age 12, which caused him a decrease of vision in his left eye. He later attended Southern Methodist University and played club hockey there despite his injury, and later became a goalie coach of the Allen Americans of the ECHL. During his time there, he was put into a 2016 game for the Americans, entering with 50 seconds remaining in the game.

== NHL appearance ==
On April 29, 2022, both of the Anaheim Ducks' goaltenders, John Gibson and Anthony Stolarz, were injured during a game against the Dallas Stars. Hodges entered the game during the third period as the emergency backup goaltender, after signing a one-game contract with the NHL. Donning a Stars helmet and pads, and wearing number 68 for the Ducks without a nameplate on the back, he entered the game at 0:54 of the 3rd period with the game tied 2–2. He made two saves on three shots, allowing a goal from Jason Robertson, which wound up being the game winner to help secure a 4–2 win for Dallas. He became the first emergency backup to enter a game in the NHL since David Ayres in 2020. Hodges' performance drew applause from fans and players from both teams.

For his efforts, Hodges earned the third star of the game, and was able to secure his game-worn jersey and a game puck.

== Career statistics ==
=== Regular season ===
			Regular season
Season	Team	League	GP	W	L	OTL	TOI	SA	GA	SO	GAA	SV%
2016–17	Allen Americans	ECHL	1	0	0	0	1	0	0	0	0.00	–
2021–22	Anaheim Ducks	NHL	1	0	1	0	19	3	1	0	3.11	.667
NHL totals			1	0	1	0	19	3	1	0	3.11	.667

== See also ==
- Jorge Alves – Carolina Hurricanes equipment manager who played as a backup goalie for his team on December 31, 2016
- David Ayres - Zamboni driver who played for the Carolina Hurricanes in 2020, becoming the first emergency goalie to record a win in an NHL game
- Matt Berlin - Backup goalie and college student who played for the Edmonton Oilers on January 28, 2023, saving his lone shot faced
- Scott Foster - Backup goalie and accountant who played for the Chicago Blackhawks in 2017 and saved every shot faced
- Lester Patrick – former New York Rangers coach who, at age 44, played in the 1928 Stanley Cup Finals for the team as an emergency goalie
- List of players who played only one game in the NHL
