= Jett Alexander =

- Born: November 8, 1999 (age 26) Bloomfield, Ontario, Canada
- Height: 6 ft 5 in (196 cm)
- Weight: 201 lb (91 kg; 14 st 5 lb)
- Position: Goaltender
- Caught: Left
- Played for: Toronto Maple Leafs
- NHL draft: Undrafted
- Playing career: 2023–2023

Jett Alexander (born November 8, 1999) is a Canadian amateur ice hockey player. He made his National Hockey League debut on April 8, 2023, for the Toronto Maple Leafs after substituting for goaltender Ilya Samsonov with 1:10 remaining in the third period against the Montreal Canadiens. Alexander currently plays for the University of Toronto Varsity Blues men's hockey team.

== Biography ==
Jett Alexander was born in Bloomfield, Ontario on November 8, 1999. He is currently double majoring in English and environmental science at the University of Toronto.

== Playing career ==
=== Early career ===
Alexander began his junior career in the 2015–2016 season with the North York Rangers in the Ontario Junior Hockey League (OHJL). During the 2018–2019 season, his last with the team, he broke a league record for shutouts with ten and finished with a save percentage of .945. Alexander was named the OJHL's top goaltender and most valuable player, and the CJHL's top goaltender. The OJHL also awarded him the Goaltender of the Year Award.

He spent the 2019–2020 season with the Prince George Spruce Kings of the British Columbia Junior Hockey League.

=== U Sports ===
Alexander committed to the University of Toronto Varsity Blues' men's hockey team in May 2020 for the 2020–2021 season, which was ultimately cancelled due to the COVID-19 pandemic.

For the 2021—2022 shortened season, Alexander played as backup for goaltender Alex Bishop. He played in two OUA games, starting in one of them, and overall achieved a .880 save percentage.

The following, 2022–2023 season, Alexander took on the role as starting goaltender, playing in twenty-two regular season games. He achieved a .927 save percentage and earned his team a second-straight playoff berth. During the post-season, he and the Varsity Blues defeated the TMU Bold in the first round 2–1, but succumbed to the Lakehead Thunderwolves 1–2 in round two, earning a .918 save percentage for both rounds.

=== National Hockey League ===
On December 2, 2021, Alexander signed an amateur tryout contract (ATO) with the Colorado Avalanche to serve as an emergency backup for goaltender Jonas Johansson against the Toronto Maple Leafs as starting goaltender Darcy Kuemper was out with an upper-body injury. He held the role for the duration of the first period until Colorado Eagles goaltender Justus Annunen made it to Scotiabank Arena.

On April 8, 2023, Alexander signed an ATO with the Toronto Maple Leafs to back up starting goaltender Ilya Samsonov in their game against the Montreal Canadiens as goaltender Matt Murray could not play due to a head injury. With one minute and ten seconds remaining in the third period, and Toronto leading 7–1, Alexander was substituted in place of Samsonov. He faced zero shots.
