= Jorge Alves (ice hockey) =

American ice hockey player

- Born: January 30, 1979 (age 47) Stoughton, Massachusetts, U.S.
- Height: 5 ft 9 in (175 cm)
- Weight: 185 lb (84 kg; 13 st 3 lb)
- Position: Goaltender
- Caught: Left
- Played for: Carolina Hurricanes
- NHL draft: Undrafted
- Playing career: 2004–2007; 2016

Jorge Alves (pronounced George Ahlves; born January 30, 1979) is an American equipment manager and emergency back-up goaltender for the Carolina Hurricanes of the National Hockey League (NHL) and a 2026 Stanley Cup Champion. He is best known for playing goaltender for the Hurricanes at the very end of one game during the 2016–17 season, only playing for 7.6 seconds, the shortest career for a goalie in NHL history.

== Early life ==
Alves was born in Stoughton, Massachusetts, a twin brother in a Portuguese-American family. He began playing ice hockey at 14 or 15 years old, not having been able to afford it previously. He graduated from Stoughton High School where he played goaltender on the school's hockey team.

He served in the United States Marine Corps from 1997 to 2001. While he was in boot camp, his parents withheld offer letters from junior and college hockey teams, fearing that he would regret his decision to enlist. Alves then attended North Carolina State University, where he was the Wolfpack club's starting goaltender.

== Professional career ==
Alves played professional hockey for the Greenville Grrrowl, South Carolina Stingrays, Charlotte Checkers and Pensacola Ice Pilots of the ECHL and Asheville Aces of the Southern Professional Hockey League (SPHL). He played nine games across the two leagues between 2004 and 2007.

During the 2003–04 season, Alves was hired as an assistant equipment manager of the Carolina Hurricanes of the National Hockey League (NHL). He became a full-time equipment manager for the team during the 2012–13 season.

Alves gained significant attention on December 31, 2016, when he signed a professional try-out contract to serve as a backup goaltender for the Hurricanes in their game later that day, due to the illness of Eddie Läck, who had suffered a concussion. While serving as backup, Alves engaged in his regular duties as equipment manager, such as sharpening skates and taping sticks. With the Hurricanes losing 3–1 to the Tampa Bay Lightning and the Lightning having iced the puck at the end of the game, Hurricanes' coach Bill Peters put Alves in the net in place of starting goalie Cam Ward for the final seconds of the match. He faced no shots in his debut. At age 37, Alves became one of the oldest players in NHL history to make their debut, and with 7.6 seconds of action, Alves achieved the third shortest debut in league history, behind Kellan Lain, who recorded a two-second debut in 2014 and Greg Koehler with a four-second debut in 2000. Additionally, Alves set a record for the shortest debut by a goaltender, surpassing both Robbie Irons and Christian Soucy, who each played for three minutes in their NHL careers.

In 2026, while still working as the Hurricanes' equipment manager, Alves was engraved on the Stanley Cup after Carolina won. Beginning in the 2026–27 NHL season, each NHL team was required to hire a permanent emergency back-up goaltender (EBUG); in addition to continuing his role as a equipment manager, Alves stepped into the role of the Hurricanes' permanent EBUG.

== Personal life ==
Alves speaks Portuguese. He has two children with his wife, Amanda. Alves met his wife at a nightclub in Raleigh, North Carolina which would later become the site of a Hurricanes practice facility.

== Career statistics ==
=== Regular season and playoffs ===
			Regular season										Playoffs
Season	Team	League	GP	W	L	T	OTL	MIN	GA	SO	GAA	SV%	GP	W	L	MIN	GA	SO	GAA	SV%
2002–03	North Carolina State University	ACHA II	—	—	—	—	—	—	—	—	—	—	—	—	—	—	—	—	—	—
2004–05	Asheville Aces	SPHL	2	0	1	0	—	49	8	0	9.75	.680	—	—	—	—	—	—	—	—
2005–06	South Carolina Stingrays	ECHL	1	0	0	—	0	4	0	0	0.00	1.000	—	—	—	—	—	—	—	—
2005–06	Greenville Grrrowl	ECHL	1	0	0	—	0	29	1	0	2.08	.875	—	—	—	—	—	—	—	—
2006–07	South Carolina Stingrays	ECHL	1	0	0	—	0	—	0	0	0.00	1.000	—	—	—	—	—	—	—	—
2006–07	Charlotte Checkers	ECHL	2	0	0	—	0	—	0	0	0.00	1.000	—	—	—	—	—	—	—	—
2006–07	Pensacola Ice Pilots	ECHL	2	0	0	—	0	25	5	0	11.90	.722	—	—	—	—	—	—	—	—
2016–17	Carolina Hurricanes	NHL	1	0	0	—	0	1	0	0	0.00	1.000	—	—	—	—	—	—	—	—
NHL totals			1	0	0	—	0	1	0	0	0.00	1.000	—	—	—	—	—	—	—	—

== See also ==
- David Ayres, who in 2020 became the first emergency goalie to record an NHL win when he subbed in for the Hurricanes
- Scott Foster, NHL emergency goalie who in 2018 played 14 minutes in relief for the Chicago Blackhawks
- Tom Hodges – Backup goalie and life insurance salesman who played for the Anaheim Ducks on April 30, 2022
- Eric Semborski, Philadelphia Flyers emergency goalie, whose substitution was attempted in 2017, but was removed by the referee as the primary goalie was not injured.
