= Goaltender =

Person who tends the goal in ice hockey

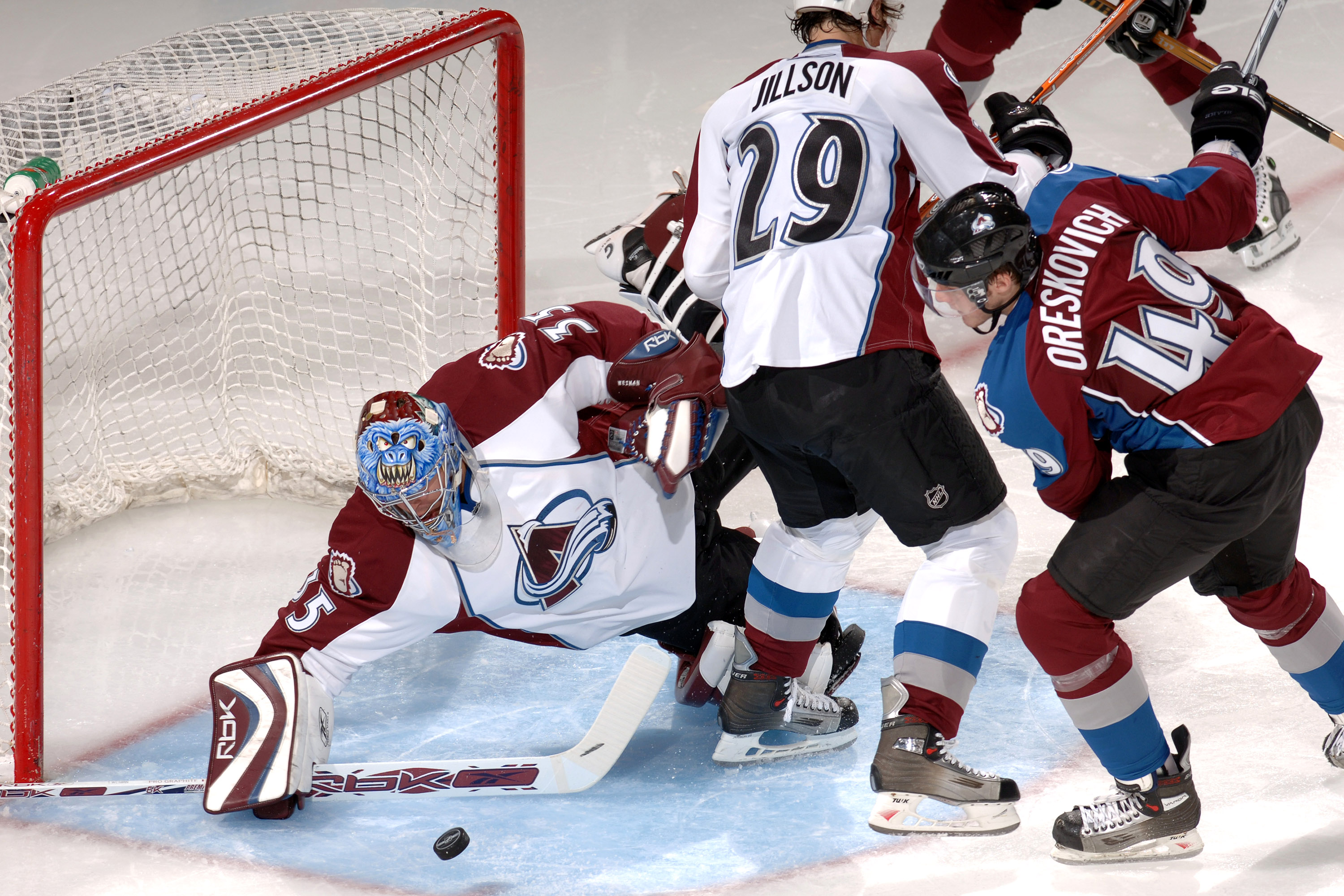
Goaltender Tyler Weiman makes a save with his stick. In casual hockey terms, it may simply be referred to as a stick save.

In ice hockey, the goaltender (commonly referred to as goalie or netminder) is the player responsible for preventing the hockey puck from entering their own team's net, thus preventing the opposing team from scoring. The goaltender mostly plays in or near the area in front of the net, called the goal crease (often referred to simply as the crease). Goaltenders tend to stay at or beyond the top of the crease to cut down on the angle of shots. In the modern age of goaltending there are two common styles, butterfly and hybrid (hybrid is a mix of the traditional stand-up style and butterfly technique). Because of the power of shots, the goaltender wears special equipment to protect the body from direct impact.

Goaltenders are one of the most important players on the ice, as their performance may greatly impact the outcome or score of the game. One-on-one situations, such as breakaways and shootouts, have the tendency to showcase a goaltender's pure skill, or lack thereof. No more than one goaltender per team is permitted to be on the ice at any given time. The rules do not oblige the use of a goaltender and so teams may instead opt to play with an extra skater. However the defensive disadvantage that follows means that this strategy is normally used purely as a desperation maneuver when needing to score late in a game. It may also be used when there is a delayed penalty (should the team to be short-handed touch the puck the play will stop as the penalty is called).

The goaltender is also known as the goalie, goaler, goalkeeper, netminder, GK, tendy, and tender by those involved in the hockey community. In the early days of the sport, the term was spelled with a hyphen as goal-tender. The art of playing the position is called goaltending and there are coaches, usually called the goalie coach, who specialize exclusively in working with goaltenders. The variation goalie is typically used for items associated with the position, such as goalie stick and goalie pads.

Although "goaltender" is by far the more-commonly used term for the position, the official rules of the National Hockey League (NHL) and the International Ice Hockey Federation (IIHF) use the term "goalkeeper".

== Privileges ==
Braden Holtby positions himself in the goal crease in front of the net, attempting to stop an incoming shot from Bryan Rust. The other attacker, Sidney Crosby (#87, far left), is not allowed to enter the crease to interfere with the goaltender

The goaltender has special privileges and training that other players do not. They wear special goaltending equipment that is different from that worn by other players and is subject to specific regulations. Goaltenders may use any part of their bodies to block shots. The goaltender may legally hold (or freeze) the puck with their hands to cause a stoppage of play. If a player from the other team hits the goaltender without making an attempt to get out of their way, the offending player may be penalized. In some leagues (including the NHL), if a goaltender's stick breaks, they can continue playing with a broken stick until the play is stopped, unlike other players, who must drop broken sticks immediately.

The goaltender normally plays in or near the goal crease the entire game, an area marked in front of the net, unlike the other positions where players are on ice for shifts and make frequent line changes. Attackers cannot make contact with the goaltender within the crease, as this interferes with the goaltender's ability to make saves. However, attackers may still enter the crease if they have the opportunity to make a play on a loose puck.

Additionally, if a goaltender acts in such a way that would cause a normal player to be given a penalty, such as slashing or tripping another player, the goaltender cannot be sent to the penalty box. Instead, one of the goaltender's teammates who was on the ice at the time of the infraction is sent to the penalty box in their place; the goaltender will still be credited with the penalty minutes on the scoresheet. However, if the goaltender receives a game misconduct or match penalty, they must immediately leave the ice and be replaced by another goaltender. In such cases, an unpenalized player is required to serve any minutes assessed to the ejected player in the penalty box; this holds true for all hockey positions in the event a player is ejected from the game.

It is common for a coach to substitute a goaltender out if they have allowed several goals in a short period of time. Usually, a substituted goaltender does not return for the rest of the game. Patrick Roy, playing for the Montreal Canadiens at the time, was infamously kept in net during a game in 1995 by head coach Mario Tremblay. Roy perceived this as a means of humiliation, as he had allowed nine goals on 26 shots to that point. Tremblay finally pulled Roy midway through the second period; as he was walking to the locker room, Roy famously leaned toward Canadiens president Ronald Corey and told him that it would be Roy's "last game in Montreal." The Canadiens lost the game, 11–1; Roy was traded to the Colorado Avalanche four days later.

Seventeen goaltenders have scored a goal in NHL games; combined, NHL goaltenders have scored 20 total goals. A goaltender can score by either shooting the puck into the net directly, or being awarded the goal as the last player on their team to touch the puck if an opponent scores an own goal. Of these goals, twelve were scored by shooting the puck and eight were the result of own goals. As of 2023, Ron Hextall and Martin Brodeur are the only goaltenders in NHL history to be credited with multiple goals; Hextall remains the only NHL goaltender to have scored multiple goals by directly shooting the puck. Brodeur is the only goaltender to be credited with three goals, and is the only NHL goaltender to have been credited with a game-winning goal.

A hockey team is not technically required to use a goaltender. At any time in any game, a team may remove its goaltender from the ice in favor of an extra attacker, colloquially known as "pulling the goalie". Using an extra attacker is typically intended to overwhelm the opposing team's defense, and unlike during a power play, the defense cannot legally ice the puck if they are not already shorthanded due to a penalty. This puts the team without a goaltender at a significant advantage on offense, but it also allows an opposing team to score an empty net goal from virtually anywhere on the ice. Teams who pull the goalie do so almost always as a desperation measure late in games where they are trailing, or in the event of a delayed penalty, where play is whistled dead after their opponents take possession of the puck.

NHL rules strongly encourage that teams use goaltenders in overtime; if a team opts for the extra attacker in overtime and an empty-net goal is scored, the game is credited as a regulation loss, worth zero points in the standings, instead of an overtime loss, worth one point. In rare cases, hockey teams have pulled the goalie while tied in regulation time or in overtime, due to the urgent need for the two standings points for a win justifying the risk of earning zero points for a loss.

The rules of the IIHF, NHL and Hockey Canada do not permit goaltenders to be designated as on-ice captains, because of the logistical challenge of having the goaltender relay rules discussions between referees and coaches and then return to the crease. The Vancouver Canucks did name goaltender Roberto Luongo as their team captain during the 2008–09 and 2009–10 seasons, but due to NHL rules, he did not serve as the official on-ice captain. In the NCAA, there is no position-based restriction on the team captain.

== Roster ==
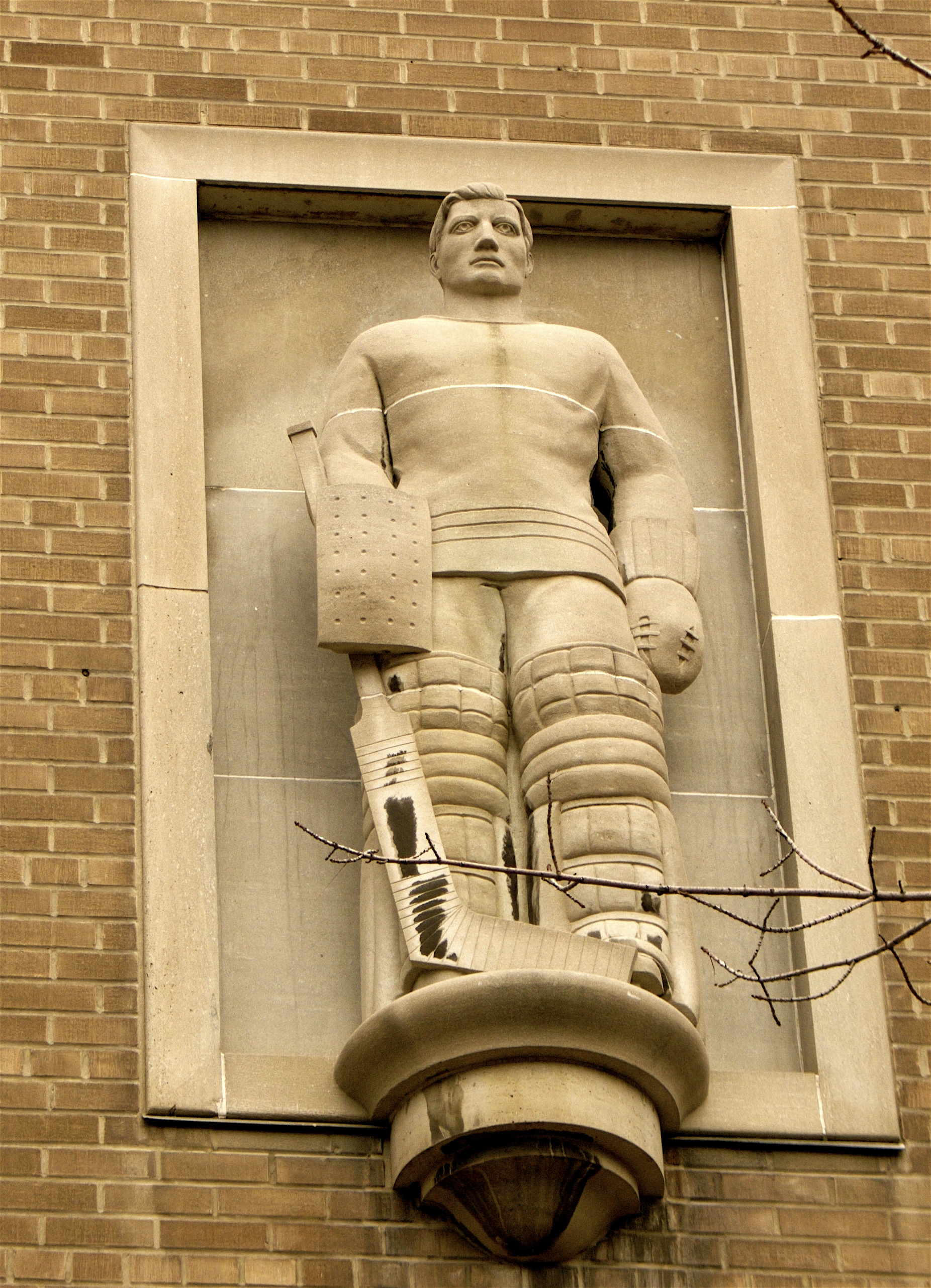
Elizabeth Wyn Wood's high relief of goaltender Turk Broda at Toronto Metropolitan University.

Goaltenders are a specialized position in ice hockey; at higher levels in the game, no goaltenders play other positions and no other players play goaltender. At minor levels and recreational games, goaltenders do occasionally switch with others players who have been taught goaltending; however, most recreational hockey rules are now forbidding position swapping due to an increase in injuries.

A typical ice hockey team has two or three goaltenders on its roster. Most teams typically have a starting goaltender who plays the majority of the regular season games and all of the playoffs, with the backup goaltender only stepping in if the starter is pulled or injured, or in cases where the schedule is too heavy for one goaltender to play every game.

Professional hockey leagues at all levels require each team have a list of "emergency" goaltenders. The list provides goaltender options for both the home and visiting teams. These goaltenders are to be called to a game if a team does not have two goaltenders to start the game, most often in the ECHL where a goaltender can be called up to the American Hockey League (AHL) that afternoon and the team is unable to sign a backup or the scheduled backup is unable to make the game on time after a callup. An "emergency" goaltender may also be called if both roster goaltenders are injured in the same game.

=== Goalie tandem ===
Some teams have used a goaltender tandem where two goaltenders split the regular season playing duties, though often one of them is considered the number one goaltender who gets the start in the playoffs. An example is the 1982–83 New York Islanders with Billy Smith and Roland Melanson; Melanson was named to the NHL second All-Star team for his regular season play while Smith won the Conn Smythe Trophy as the playoff MVP and both players shared the William M. Jennings Trophy for fewest goals allowed. Another instance is the Edmonton Oilers' Andy Moog and Grant Fuhr; both of them earned All-Star Game appearances for the regular season play, with Moog being the starter in the 1983 playoffs and Fuhr for the 1984 playoffs (although Moog started Game 4 and 5 of the 1984 Stanley Cup Final due to Fuhr's injury) and subsequent postseasons.

The Toronto Maple Leafs had Terry Sawchuk and Johnny Bower share goaltending duties in the regular season and games, playoffs, winning the 1964–65 Vezina Trophy (shared) and the 1967 Stanley Cup. The 1996–97 Philadelphia Flyers' Ron Hextall and Garth Snow alternated in the playoffs; Snow started nine of the ten games during the first two rounds, but Hextall took over in game two of conference finals and remained the starting goaltender for the remainder of the playoffs, though Snow started for game two of the Stanley Cup Final.

=== Back-up goaltender ===
In professional ice hockey, the back-up goaltender fills an important team role. Although the back-up will spend most games sitting on the bench, the back-up must be prepared to play every game. A back-up may be forced into duty at any time to relieve the starting goaltender in the event of an injury or poor game performance. The back-up will also be called upon to start some games to give the starter the opportunity to rest from game-play during the season.

==== Emergency goaltender ====
Most professional leagues require each home team to maintain a list of local non-professional goaltenders, available to either team, who can be used in the exceptional case that one or both of a team's normal goaltenders are injured or unavailable (such as a player acquired in a trade or minor league call-up arriving late on short notice); such a goaltender who fulfills that role is known as an emergency back-up goaltender (EBUG). Similar rules are in place for the NHL's minor leagues, where emergency goaltenders are used much more frequently. Those on a team's emergency list are given free attendance to home games they are assigned and may also help out as a practice goalie. Emergency goalies are often called from nearby college teams, adult semi-pro/amateur leagues, or the home team's own coaching/facilities staff. If activated for a game, most emergency goaltenders only dress to sit on the bench, as a team's normal back-up takes over; only six emergency goalies (David Ayres, Scott Foster, Jorge Alves, Thomas Hodges, Matt Berlin, Jett Alexander) have ever seen recorded playing time in an NHL game. Emergency goalies who are activated sign either an amateur or professional tryout contract.

Incidents of Activated EBUGs in the NHL
Emergency Back-up Goalie	Team	Date	Opponent	W	L	OTL	TOI	SA	GA	GAA	SV%
Jett Alexander	Toronto Maple Leafs	April 8, 2023	Montreal Canadiens	0	0	0	01:10	0	0	0.00	1.000
Matt Berlin	Edmonton Oilers	January 23, 2023	Chicago Blackhawks	0	0	0	02:26	1	0	0.00	1.000
Tom Hodges	Anaheim Ducks	April 29, 2022	Dallas Stars	0	1	0	19:06	3	1	3.11	.667
David Ayres	Carolina Hurricanes	February 22, 2020	Toronto Maple Leafs	1	0	0	28:41	10	2	4.18	.800
Scott Foster	Chicago Blackhawks	March 29, 2018	Winnipeg Jets	0	0	0	14:01	7	0	0.00	1.000
Jorge Alves	Carolina Hurricanes	December 31, 2016	Tampa Bay Lightning	0	0	0	00:07	0	0	0.00	1.000

During the Stanley Cup playoffs, roster limits are relaxed and teams routinely recall minor league players (known as "black aces") to act as depth, resulting in playoff EBUGs being minor league professionals rather than local amateurs.

In July 2025, as part of a new four-year collective bargaining agreement to take effect starting with the 2026–27 NHL season, the NHL and NHLPA agreed to reform the rules on EBUGs. Teams will no longer contract local goaltenders to play in case of an emergency; instead, they can now sign a permanent EBUG, who will travel with the team and can perform additional coaching or team duties (similar to a bullpen catcher in baseball). Permanent EBUGs will face restrictions to ensure teams do not hire "ringers"; they must not have played professional hockey at any level in the previous three seasons, cannot have ever played a single game in the NHL under a standard player contract, and cannot have played more than 80 professional games in their careers. If a team signs three or more goaltenders, the team is still required to hire a permanent EBUG but is not required to have their EBUG present for a game. EBUGs will be required to wear 00 as their uniform number. The first team reported to sign a permanent EBUG was the Boston Bruins, who hired Kyle Chauvette. NHL teams still maintain unofficial lists of local amateurs to fill in the emergency role if the EBUG is activated for a game.

== Glossary and techniques ==
- Angle play: The method where, by positioning oneself in a direct line between the puck (not the shooter) and the net, a goaltender covers more of the net than he would otherwise be able to, and often "skulling" slowly, directly towards and closing on the opposing shooter to block more of the net. Two of the most notable angle goaltenders in the 1970s were Gilles Gilbert and Bernie Parent.
- Blocker: The blocker is a rectangular piece of equipment with a glove to hold the stick. The blocker is predominantly worn on the dominant hand of the goaltender. The blocker protects the wrist area and can be used to direct shots away from the net. The blocker should be positioned at one's side, and at a height which allows the goaltender's stick to remain flat on the ice while in their ready stance.
- Trapper: Often simply referred to as the goalie's "glove," the goalie's catching glove was originally shaped in the same fashion as a baseball glove. It has evolved into a highly specific piece of equipment that is designed specifically for catching the puck. Some of the more significant changes are the use of a "string mesh" in the pocket of the trapper and the substantial palm and wrist protection. The pocket is the area between the thumb and first finger of the glove and is where most goaltenders try to catch the puck; catching in the pocket reduces the chance of a rebound falling out of the glove. The trapper must not be more than 18 inches across. The trapper can be held in a variety of positions depending upon the individual goaltender, but the trend among younger goaltenders is to hold the glove with the palm facing towards the shooter, instead of the "shake hands" position that was popular previously. The "Cheater" portion of the glove is the portion of the glove on the outside area of the thumb and the part that covers the wrist of the goaltender.
- Butterfly save: A save utilizing the butterfly technique in which the goaltender drives their knees down to the ice and splays their legs out to the sides while keeping their stick on the ice between their legs to cover the five-hole with their hands on either side of their body above each leg pad. For most modern goaltenders, the butterfly is the default technique around which the rest of their game is built as it theoretically stops any shots along the ice and provides optimal net-coverage.
- Butterfly slide: A technique in which the goaltender moves laterally by pushing with one leg and sliding with the other leg's knee on the ice. Once the push has been completed, the pushing leg's knee is brought back down to the ice to resume the butterfly position for the remainder of the slide. This technique allows for lateral movement while minimizing opportunities for pucks to slide under the goaltender by keeping at least one leg pad flat on the ice throughout.
- Hasek roll: The Hasek roll is a desperation maneuver named after Czech goaltender Dominik Hašek. In the stacked pad stance the lower part of the net is protected very well, but the upper third is completely open. In a last-ditch effort to block an incoming high shot the goaltender can roll around his upper back, flailing his pads through the air and stacking them on the other side. If the timing is right the goalie might get his leg up just in time to make the save.

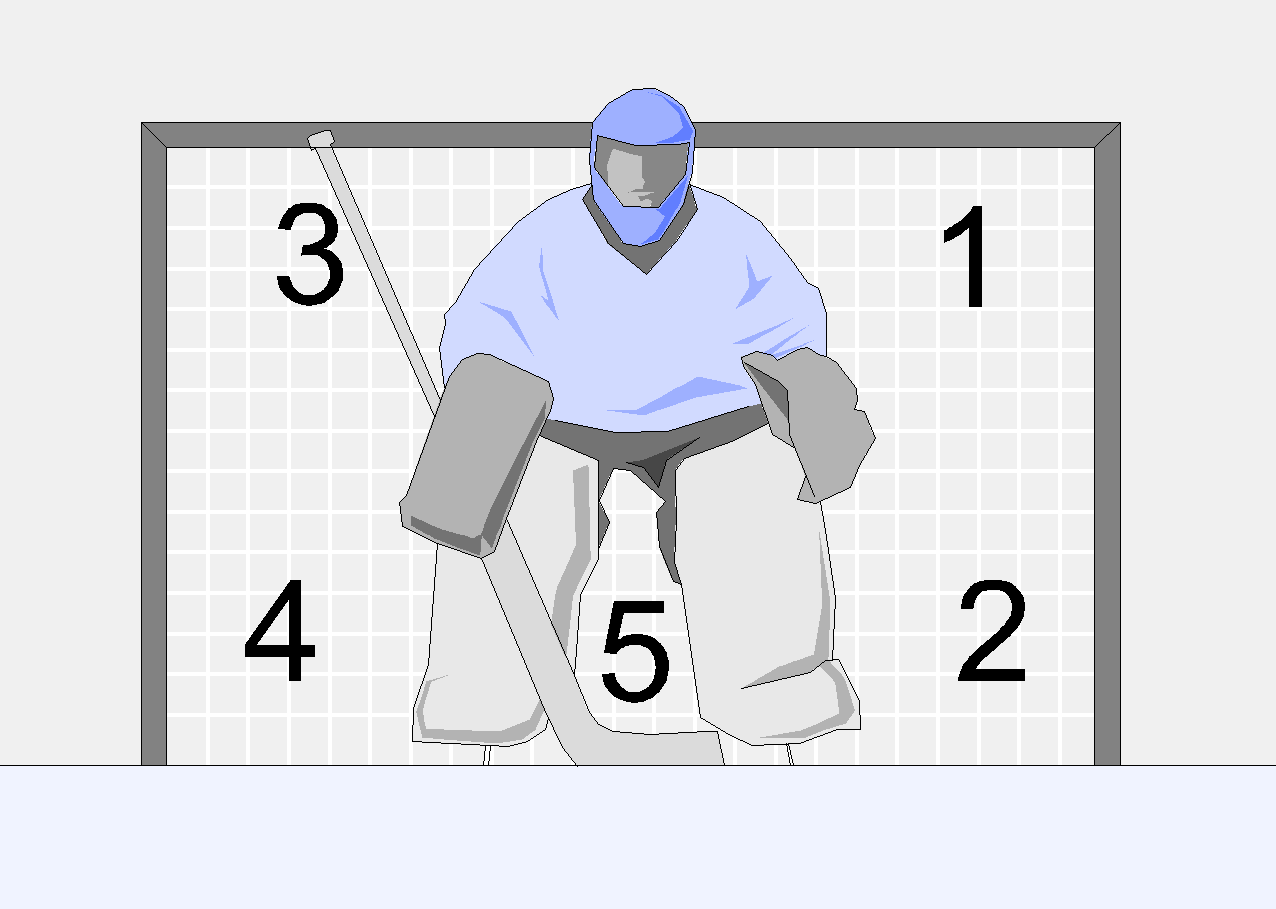
The holes on the goalpost

- Holes one through five: When a goaltender stands in the net in the ready position, there are seven open areas that the goalie must cover. They are:
1. Glove side, high: this area is defined by the goaltender's arm and catcher on the bottom, mask on the inside, and the post and top of the goal on the outside.
2. Glove side, low: this area is defined by the goaltender's arm and catcher on the top, the ice on the bottom, and the outside post of the goal. During a butterfly-style save, this area is closed off completely and the catcher is typically stacked on top of the leg pad as the leg is extended to cover the post.
3. Stick side, high: this area is defined by the goal post, top of the goal, and the goalie's arm and blocker. The top half of the goaltender's stick is held in this area, but is not commonly used for stopping the puck.
4. Stick side, low: this area is the lower half of the stick side, defined by the blocker and arm, the ice, and the outer post of the goal. During a butterfly save this area is also covered by the leg pad with the blocker stacked on top to protect against low shots. When a goaltender is standing, the paddle of their stick is used to cover this area and to deflect the puck away from the net.
5. 'Five Hole': the fifth and final area is between the goalie's leg pads and skates. This area is protected by the blade of the stick at all times, and is closed up by the upper leg pads when the goalie is in the butterfly position.
6. 'Six and Seven Hole': the six and seven holes are relatively new terms to identify the areas under either armpit of the goalie. Goaltenders who hold their trapper high or blocker further out to the side of their body are said to have six and seven holes.
7. 'Six Hole (slang)': The "six hole" is also used as a slang term used when a save is made, but the puck goes into the net, resulting in a goal. The term is used when the goalie is unsure how the puck made it past them.
- Leg pads: Worn on the goaltender's legs to both protect the legs and help stop shots. Current NHL Rules have reduced leg pad width to 11 inches (280 mm); the overall height is restricted based upon an individual proportionally. The leg pads generally come to about three inches above the knee. Due to the popularity of the butterfly style, modern leg pads are now built with a 'landing surface' that sits flat on the ice during the butterfly technique and allows the 'face' of the pad to face outward and offer the most protection to the goalie while presenting the largest blocking surface possible to the shooter.
- (Leg) kick save: Any save made with the leg pad. A kick save often refers to a save in which the goaltender kicks their leg outward to block the puck and/or to more effectively redirect the puck to a desired location.
- Lie: The angle created between the handle (paddle) of a goaltender's stick and the blade. The higher the lie, the closer the stick resembles the capital letter "L". A higher lie number of 15+ is traditionally for goaltenders who tend to stand up more in their stance; A lower lie number of 11 or 12 is for goaltenders who play with a more butterfly stance down on the ice more often.
- Mask: The protective headgear worn by goaltenders. The first goaltender to wear a mask in the National Hockey League was Clint Benedict in 1930 who wore a crude form made of leather. In November 1959, Jacques Plante, wore a self-made fiberglass mask after taking a New York Rangers shot to the face. Following his lead, goaltenders around the world began to don protective headgear, which is now a requirement. Masks have evolved from the flush style introduced by Plante, to the player's helmet/special "birdcage" style best associated with Vladislav Tretiak and Chris Osgood, to the modern hybrid helmet, made of advanced materials such as carbon fiber or Kevlar, increasing in safety as time went on. Especially at higher levels of hockey, many goaltenders have their masks painted to represent their team's colors/imagery, landmarks in the city they play in or personal interests/nicknames. Examples of this include Mike Richter's Statue of Liberty mask, Ed Belfour's Eagle on his mask (Eddie the Eagle nickname), Ryan Miller featuring the words "Matt Man" on his masks in honor of his late cousin, and Craig Anderson honouring his father's National Corvette Museum board service (as a former Corvette racer) by having a Chevrolet Corvette on his masks.
- Paddle: The thick part of the goaltender's stick, not to be confused with the blade. The paddle has a maximum length of 26 inches (660 mm) in the NHL. The blade is the part of the stick that should remain flat on the ice, as compared with the paddle.
- Paddle down: A type of stance by the goaltender when the play is coming from the corner to the front of the net and the puck carrier is carrying the puck in front of the net looking to score. Here the goaltender puts the stick down on the ground, parallel to the ice, with the leg farthest from the post down and the other up and ready to push. This works well against angled rushes or wrap arounds where the skater would normally out–skate the goalie. The skater does have the top part of the net to shoot at, but it is difficult to lift the puck over the goalie from up close. The paddle down stance is also effective against low passes from behind the net to players looking to score from the slot.
- Poke check: When the goaltender wants to poke the puck away from an opposing player, they quickly slides their hand up the stick, thrusting forward towards the puck. An improperly played poke check is a risky play; the goaltender may miss, and the puck-carrier will be left with an unguarded net. In tight situations, a quick, hard jab could be used.
- Pro-fly: This style of play is derived from the butterfly style of play, although most will argue that this is nothing more than a marketing term. Current leg pad design allows for the full face of the pad to be perpendicular to the ice, maximizing blocking area. This is also called "flaring the pad", almost all modern goaltenders play this style. The stance is very wide and low to maximize the amount of body blocking the net. Many of today's great goaltenders have adopted this technique. This forces the shooter to get the puck off the ice to score. The con of this stance is that it is very hard to move quickly. The more efficient users of this style include Henrik Lundqvist of the New York Rangers, Connor Hellebuyck of the Winnipeg Jets, Jonathan Quick of the Los Angeles Kings, and Roberto Luongo of the Florida Panthers. This is still considered a butterfly motion, as the mechanics of making the save are the same, however it is the design of the leg pad that achieves this rotation more than anything.
- Screen shot: Screen shots are blind shots, in which the goalie can not find the location of the puck. Goalies should never anticipate or guess when and where the puck will hit. In the screen shot, another player (usually an opponent, but sometimes the goaltender's own teammate) stands between the shooter and the goaltender, obscuring the goaltender's vision of the shot. On a screen shot, the goaltender must do everything possible to try to see the shot, as dropping to the butterfly stance and thrusting their glove out at the sound of a shot is not the best idea in the modern game. Some goalies, such as Ed Belfour or Ron Hextall, went as far as (illegally) punching players in the head or slashing their legs.
- Shuffle: This may refer two different techniques: A standing shuffle is a technique in which a goaltender, in a standing position, pushes with one skate and slides with the other while keeping both skates facing forward to make small lateral movements. A butterfly shuffle is a technique in which a goaltender in the butterfly position makes small pushes using their knees to make very small lateral movements without compromising the butterfly's net-coverage.
- Skate save: A save made with the goaltender's skate. The goaltender decides which direction the rebound should travel in, and turns their skate in that direction. Then, bending the other leg, they push towards the puck with the off leg, as the bent knee drops to the ice. This move is rarely used since the butterfly method has become popular. A skate save's effectiveness is more limited because of the difficulty in directing a puck compared with using a stick, a blocker, or the pad.
- Stacked Pad Slide: When a goaltender is on the angle, often a sudden pass close to the net will leave the net relatively unguarded. Stacking the pads is a desperation move in which the goaltender slides feet-first, with legs together (and consequently, "stacked"), across the crease, attempting to cover as much space as possible.
- Stance: In a proper stance, the goaltender has the weight on the balls of their feet, the trapper and blocker just above knee-height and slightly out in front so they can be seen in the goalies peripheral vision, and the stick flat on the ice. Stance should also be conformed to the goaltender's style and comfort.
- Stick: The stick, held by the goaltender in their blocker hand, the blade of the stick should remain flat on the ice. Keep notice of the lie on a new stick. A high lie will force a goaltender to play on their heels, offsetting balance, while a low lie places a goaltender lower to the ice, and may affect high saves.
- Stick save: A save made with the goaltender's stick. On stick saves, the goaltender should not keep a tight grip on the stick, instead allowing the shot's momentum to push the stick back into the skates/pads, cushioning the blow.
- Stood on his head: This is a term to describe an outstanding performance by an ice hockey goaltender in a short period of time. Often when a goalie lets out a rebound, the opposition returns the shot quickly, and the goalie has to make a quick save. A goalie often falls on their side and "stacks the pads" and appears to nearly stand on their head. The term may have been derived after NHL President Frank Calder, alluding to the 1918 rules change that permitted goalies to leave their feet to make a save, remarked, "As far as I am concerned, they can stand on their head(s)."
- Skulling: Skulling is a method of moving inward and outward from the goal crease, often used in "angle play". Most often used in setting up prior to the puck entering their zone, especially to "cut down the angle." This technique is accomplished by pointing both toe's of one's skates inward or outward and allowing the skates to separate, then pulling one's skates back together to stop, all without the skates leaving the ice surface. Pointing one's toes inward results in backward movement and pointing them outward results in forward movement. This can also be referred to as telescoping or bubbling.
- T-push: A technique used by goaltenders to move larger distances laterally than can be accomplished by shuffling. The goaltender directs one skate in the desired direction of travel, rotating their body if required, and then uses the other skate to push themselves in that direction. The name "T-push" comes from the how, during the push, the skates are perpendicular to one another forming a T shape.

=== Saves ===
When a goaltender either blocks or stops a shot from going into their goal net, that action is called a save. (Note: "Save" can also be used as a verb: i.e. "The goaltender saved the shot") Goaltenders often use a particular style, but in general they make saves any way they can: catching the puck with their glove hand, deflecting the shot with their stick, blocking it with their leg pads or blocker or another part of their body, or collapsing to butterfly position to block any low shot coming, especially in close proximity. After making a save, the goaltender attempts to control the rebound to avoid a goal scored by an opposing player when the goaltender is out of position ('scoring on a rebound'), or to allow the goaltender's own team to get control of the puck. Goaltenders may catch or hold a puck shot at the net to better control how it re-enters play. If there is immediate pressure from the opposing team, a goaltender may choose to hold on to the puck (for a second or more, with judgment from the referee) to stop play for a face-off. If a goaltender holds on to the puck for too long without any pressure they may be subject to a 2-minute delay of game penalty. In the NHL and AHL, goaltenders are restricted as to where they can play the puck behind the net.

Goaltender equipment, techniques and skills have evolved over the years, dramatically improving their effectiveness altering the dynamics of the game. Goaltenders have added masks, longer pads and are physically bigger. Ken Dryden has called for bigger nets to counter their effectiveness.

== Playing styles ==
=== Stand-up style ===
The oldest playing style is the stand-up style. In this style, goaltenders are to stop the puck from a standing position, not going down. The goaltenders may bend over to stop the puck with their upper body or may kick the puck. Such saves made by kicking are known as kick saves or skate saves. They may also simply use their stick to stop it, known as a stick save. This was the style seen in the early NHL and was most commonly used up until the early 1960s. One of the more notable goaltenders who was last seen using stand up was Bill Ranford, but most of the goaltenders from earlier decades such as Jacques Plante were considered pure stand up goaltenders.

As the name suggests, the stand-up style refers to a style of goaltending in which the goaltender makes the majority of the saves standing up. This style is not as popular in the modern era, with the majority of contemporary goaltenders switching to the butterfly style and the hybrid style. The stand-up style is in contrast to the butterfly style, where goaltenders protect the net against incoming shots by dropping to their knees and shifting their legs out.

The advantage of the stand-up style is in the continued mobility of the goaltender mid save. While standing, a stand-up goaltender can remain square to the puck and adjust his positioning to ensure that he is covering as much of the net as possible at all times. The goaltender is also in a better position to stop pucks that are headed towards the upper part of the net.

The main disadvantage of the stand-up style, however, is a susceptibility to shots travelling along the bottom half of the net. A larger percentage of shots occur in the bottom portion of the net, and a goaltender utilizing the butterfly will cover a larger portion of that area. If there is a screen, however, a stand-up goaltender is generally in a better position to see the slapshot.

=== Butterfly style ===
Another style is the "Butterfly", where goaltenders go down on both pads with their toes pointing outwards and the tops of their pads meeting in the middle, thus closing up the five hole. This results in a "wall" of padding without any holes, lowering the chances of low angle shots getting in. These goaltenders rely on timing and position. Early innovators of this style were goaltending greats Glenn Hall and Tony Esposito, who played 1951–1971 and 1967–1984, respectively. Hall is credited to be among the first to use this style, and both he and Esposito had tremendous success with it. The most successful goaltender to adopt this style was Patrick Roy, who has 550 career wins in the NHL. This is the most widely used style in the NHL today. "Butterfly" goaltenders have developed methods of sliding in the "Butterfly" position in order to move around fast in one-timer situations. As pad size increased, it became a more notable style of goaltending and is still evolving.

=== Hybrid style ===
This style of goaltending is a combination of both stand-up and butterfly style, where the goaltender primarily relies on reaction, save selection, and positioning to make saves. Hybrid goaltenders will usually control rebounds well, deflect low shots with their sticks, will utilize the butterfly, and are generally not as predictable as goaltenders who rely heavily on the butterfly as a save selection. Most players are not pure stand-up or butterfly, but simply tend to prefer stand-up or butterfly over the other. If a player does not have any preferences, he is considered a hybrid goaltender. All modern NHL goaltenders generally use some form of this style. Some goaltenders who do this effectively are Ryan Miller, Jaroslav Halák, Jimmy Howard, Tuukka Rask, Carey Price and formerly Evgeni Nabokov and Martin Brodeur.

== Empty net situations ==
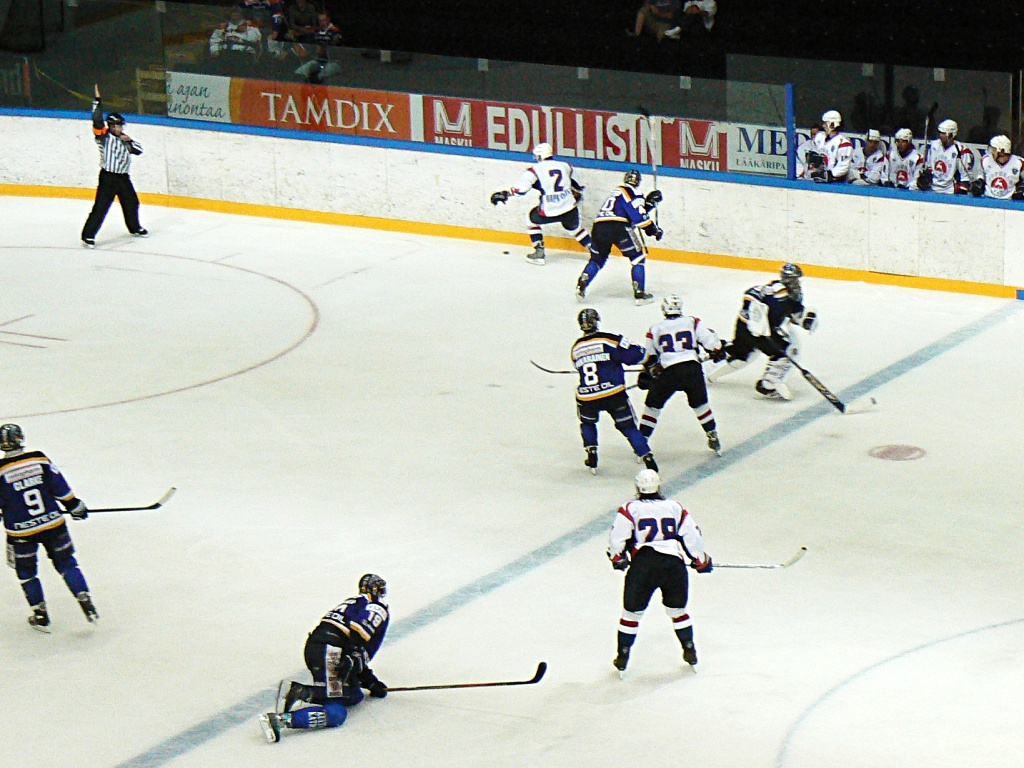
A delayed penalty call situation, in which the referee (top-left) indicates a coming penalty by raising his arm, and prepares to blow the whistle when a player from the team to be penalized (in white) touches the puck. Goaltender Jere Myllyniemi can be seen (right) rushing to the bench to send on an extra attacker.

Normally, the goaltender plays in or near the goal crease the entire game. However, teams may legally pull the goalie by substituting in a normal skater and taking the goaltender off the ice. A team temporarily playing with no goaltender is said to be playing with an empty net. This gives the team an extra attacker, but at significant risk—if the opposing team gains control of the puck, they may easily score a goal. However, shooters that attempt to score on an empty net from the opposite side of the red line face getting called for icing the puck if they miss the net. There are two common situations where a goaltender is generally pulled, as well as two less common situations:

1. The opposing team has a delayed penalty coming against them

The offended team, if in control of the puck, will pull their goaltender for an extra man. This is safe since as soon as a player on the team to be penalized touches the puck, the whistle is called, so they cannot score on the empty net. This effectively increases the one-man disadvantage beyond the standard penalty time. It is possible, however, for a team to accidentally score on their own empty net.

2. A team needs a goal in order to avoid losing (such as trailing in the remaining minute or two of a game)

The 6 on 5 play advantage is very risky, as it is fairly certain that if the opposing team gets control of the puck they will be able to score on the empty net. Sometimes if a team is trailing in the last minutes of regulation, and has a power play advantage, they may pull the goaltender for a 6 on 4 or even 6 on 3 advantage.

3. In the last few seconds of a period with a faceoff in the attacking zone

Because the defending team would likely not have enough time to start an attack even if they win the faceoff, the attacking team may pull the goalie to have a short man advantage.

4. In a tournament that takes goal differential into account, a team may pull the goalie with a significant amount of time left in an effort to create a more advantageous goal differential.

If the team could be eliminated even if they win but could still advance with a loss based on goal differential, the team may decide it has nothing to lose by trying to score with a man advantage, similar to the second situation.

A goal scored in an empty net situation is not recorded as a shot faced or goal against on the personal stats of the goaltender who has left the ice.

== NHL goaltender awards ==
- The Vezina Trophy is awarded each year by the NHL to the league's most outstanding goaltender as voted on by the general managers of the league's 32 teams, from 1981–82 NHL season and onwards.
- The William M. Jennings Trophy is awarded each year by the NHL to the goaltender(s) from the team that allowed the fewest goals during the regular season, from 1981–82 NHL season and onwards.
- The Roger Crozier Saving Grace Award was awarded from 1999–2000 to the 2006–07 seasons by the NHL to the goaltender with the best save percentage during the regular season.
- The Hart Memorial Trophy is awarded to the Most Valuable Player in the NHL.
- The Calder Memorial Trophy is awarded to the Rookie of the Year.
- The Ted Lindsay Award is awarded to the most outstanding player in the regular season as judged by the members of the NHL Players Association.
- Goaltenders are frequently candidates for the Conn Smythe Trophy, awarded to the MVP of the Stanley Cup Playoffs; as of 2026, 17 goaltenders have won the Conn Smythe, the second most common position, after centre, among recipients. Patrick Roy has won a record three times, and four goaltenders have won the Conn Smythe Trophy as part of the losing team in the Final.

== Goaltenders credited with goals ==
=== NHL ===
A goaltender scoring a goal in an NHL game is a very rare feat, having occurred only fifteen times in the history of the NHL, the first time occurring in 1979 after the league had been in existence for six decades. NHL rules forbid goaltenders from participating in play past the center line, so a goal by a goaltender is possible only under unusual circumstances. (If a goaltender does shoot the puck into the net from any location that is past the center line, the goal does not count.)

Eight of those fifteen goals resulted from the goaltender shooting into an empty net. The remaining seven goals were not actually shot into the net by the goaltender; rather the goaltender was awarded the goal because he was the last player on his team to touch the puck before the opposition scored on themselves. Martin Brodeur is the only NHL goaltender to be credited with three career goals (two in the regular season and one in the playoffs), Ron Hextall is the only goaltender who has scored two goals by shooting the puck into an empty net (once in the regular season and once in the playoffs). Damian Rhodes and José Théodore are the only goaltenders in NHL history to score a goal in which they also had a shutout game. Evgeni Nabokov of the San Jose Sharks was the first goaltender to score a power play goal.

=== AHL ===
A chronological list of goals scored in the AHL by goaltenders:

- Darcy Wakaluk, December 5, 1987, Rochester Americans at Utica
- Paul Cohen, March 28, 1992, Springfield Indians vs. Rochester
- Robb Stauber, October 9, 1995, Rochester Americans at Prince Edward Island
- Christian Bronsard, October 30, 1999, Syracuse Crunch at Rochester
- Jean-François Labbé, February 5, 2000, Hartford Wolf Pack at Quebec
- Chris Mason, October 15, 2001, Milwaukee Admirals at Utah
- Antero Niittymäki, April 11, 2004, Philadelphia Phantoms at Hershey
- Seamus Kotyk, April 17, 2005, Milwaukee Admirals at San Antonio
- Drew MacIntyre, February 20, 2008, Manitoba Moose at Chicago (overtime winner)
- Chris Holt, March 19, 2010, Binghamton Senators vs. Rochester
- Reto Berra, January 16, 2015, Lake Erie Monsters at Chicago Wolves
- Alex Nedeljkovic, March 10, 2018, Charlotte Checkers vs. Hartford
- Tristan Jarry, November 14, 2018, Wilkes-Barre/Scranton Penguins at Springfield
- Maxime Lagacé, May 25, 2019, Chicago Wolves at San Diego (first ever goalie goal in Calder Cup Playoffs history)
- Collin Delia, December 17, 2021, Rockford IceHogs at Texas
- Lukáš Dostál, March 2, 2022, San Diego Gulls vs. Colorado
- Joel Hofer, May 12, 2022, Springfield Thunderbirds vs. Wilkes-Barre/Scranton
- Jesper Wallstedt, November 12, 2022, Iowa Wild vs. Chicago
- Alex Nedeljkovic, November 17, 2023, Wilkes-Barre/Scranton Penguins at Providence (first goalie in AHL history to score two career goals)
- Pyotr Kochetkov, March 3, 2023, Chicago Wolves vs. Manitoba
- Strauss Mann, October 18, 2023, Laval Rocket vs. Rochester
- Jaxson Stauber, February 16, 2024, Rockford IceHogs vs. Chicago (first AHL goalie to score a goal and record a shutout in the same game)
- Louis Domingue, April 12, 2024, Hartford vs. Springfield
- Laurent Brossoit, December 12, 2025, Rockford vs. Milwaukee

=== ECHL ===
A chronological list of goals scored in the ECHL by goaltenders:

- Corwin Saurdiff, March 18, 1995, Hampton Roads Admirals versus Charlotte Checkers
- Olie Sundström, December 15, 1995, Erie Panthers versus Wheeling Nailers
- Sean Gauthier, December 19, 1995 at Raleigh IceCaps
- Nick Vitucci, March 6, 1996, Charlotte Checkers versus Louisville RiverFrogs (Vitucci is the only goalie to be credited with a goal on a guarded net)
- Mark Bernard, March 22, 2001, Toledo Storm versus Johnstown Chiefs
- Mike Smith, October 26, 2002, Lexington Men O'War versus Dayton Bombers
- Brian Eklund, December 5, 2003, Pensacola Ice Pilots at Mississippi Sea Wolves
- Trevor Koenig, March 2, 2005, Atlantic City Boardwalk Bullies at Wheeling Nailers
- Jonathan Quick, October 24, 2007, Reading Royals at Pensacola Ice Pilots
- Timo Pielmeier, December 19, 2009, Bakersfield Condors at Utah Grizzlies
- Brian Foster, February 15, 2013, Trenton Titans at Cincinnati Cyclones (Trenton own goal on empty net, Foster last Cyclone to touch puck)
- Alex Nedeljkovic, December 30, 2016, Florida Everblades vs. Atlanta Gladiators
- C.J. Motte, December 15, 2017, Quad City Mallards vs. Wichita Thunder (Wichita own goal on empty net, Motte last Mallard to touch puck)
- Ryan Fanti, March 25, 2023, Fort Wayne Komets vs. Rapid City Rush
- Mitchell Gibson, December 1, 2023, South Carolina Stingrays vs. Savannah Ghost Pirates
- Oskari Salminen, March 29, 2024, Norfolk Admirals vs. Atlanta Gladiators
- Jesper Vikman, January 5, 2025, Tahoe Knight Monsters at Maine Mariners

=== IHL ===
- Ryan Mior, Flint Generals vs. Dayton Gems
- Fred Brathwaite, November 9, 1996, Manitoba Moose, at Long Beach Ice Dogs

=== KHL ===
- Ilya Proskuryakov, January 25, 2009, Metallurg Magnitogorsk at Ak Bars Kazan
- Edgars Masaļskis, January 7, 2010, Dinamo Riga at Amur Khabarovsk

=== CHL ===
The first recorded instance of a professional goaltender scoring a goal occurred on February 21, 1971, in the CHL. In a game between the Oklahoma City Blazers and the Kansas City Blues, the Oklahoma City Blazers were trailing 2-1 and decided to pull their goaltender. Michel Plasse, the goaltender for the Kansas City Blues then scored on an open net.

Subsequently, four goaltenders have scored empty-net goals in the CHL: Phil Groeneveld of the Fort Worth Fire scored against the Thunder in Wichita, Kansas, on November 20, 1995; Bryan McMullen scored for the Austin Ice Bats on February 17, 2002; and Mike Wall of the Arizona Sundogs scored a goal against Corpus Christi on March 16, 2007. Danny Battochio is the most recent vs the Tulsa Oilers on December 31, 2011.

=== SPHL ===
- Josh Boyko, Macon Mayhem vs. Roanoke Rail Yard Dawgs, February 2, 2025

=== NCAA Division I ===
Men

- Having been the last player to touch the puck for his team, Jim Tortorella was credited with a goal while playing for Maine in 1980.
- Having been the last player to touch the puck for his team, Damian Rhodes was credited with a goal while playing for Michigan Tech on January 21, 1989.
- Having been the last player to touch the puck for his team, Andy Allen was credited with a goal while playing for Vermont in 1998.
- Chad Alban scored an empty-net goal for Michigan State against Ferris State on February 28, 1998. Alban is the first goalie in NCAA history to shoot the puck himself and score a goal.
- Mike Mantua scored an empty-net goal for Western Michigan in 2002.
- Having been the last player to touch the puck for his team, Jonathan Quick was credited with a goal for Massachusetts in 2007.
- Having been the last player to touch the puck for his team, Kyle Richter was credited with a goal for Harvard in 2008.
- Mitch Gillam scored an empty-net goal in his NCAA debut for Cornell against Niagara on November 26, 2013.
- Evan Weninger scored an empty-net goal for Nebraska-Omaha against Miami (OH) on January 13, 2018.
- Atte Tolvanen scored an empty-net goal for Northern Michigan against Michigan Tech on December 7, 2018.

Women

- Having been the last player to touch the puck for her team, Shanley Peters was credited with a goal while playing for Wisconsin-Superior women's team, in a game on November 15, 2013 against Wisconsin–Eau Claire.
- Corinne Schroeder was credited with an empty-net goal in her first start with Quinnipiac on September 25, 2021.

=== NCAA Division III ===
- Logan Dyck of Fredonia scored an empty net goal against Buffalo State on January 22, 2022.

=== ACHA ===
- Rocco Bruno, Florida Atlantic University, November 17, 2024, vs. University of Tampa

=== SM-liiga ===
- Mika Järvinen, 3 December 2008, KalPa against Lukko Rauma
- Lassi Lehtinen, 1 December 2018, Lukko Rauma against HC TPS
- Niklas Rubin, 30 December 2023, Porin Ässät against HC TPS (Note: Own goal by HC TPS player Michael Dal Colle, which was awarded to Niklas Rubin as he was the last Ässät player to touch the puck.)
- Juha Jatkola, 6 January 2024, KalPa against HPK

=== 2.GBun ===
- Mike Bales, 30 September 2005, Straubing Tigers at Landshut

=== DEL2 ===
- February 7, 2023, Michael Bitzer of VER Selb scored against Jonas Stettmer of the Ravensburg Towerstars. The latter was having a drink of water during what he thought was a stoppage in play.

=== Italy ===
- Craig Kowalski, December 3, 2009, Hockey Club Valpellice vs Sportivi Ghiaccio Pontebba

=== AL-Bank Ligaen (Denmark) ===
- Brian Greer, January 6, 2004 (SønderjyskE against Aalborg)
- Frederik Andersen, March 13, 2010, Frederikshavn White Hawks at Rødovre Mighty Bulls

=== Norway ===
- Chris-Henrik Nygård, September 30, 2011 (Stjernen II vs Grüner)

=== Erste Bank Eishockey Liga (Austria) ===
- Andrew Verner, January 27, 2006 (Klagenfurter AC vs HC TWK Innsbruck)
- Jaakko Suomalainen, December 30, 2010 (HK Acroni Jesenice vs KHL Medveščak Zagreb)
- Thomas Höneckl, December 21, 2012 (EC VSV vs HC TWK Innsbruck "Die Haie")

=== Australian Ice Hockey League (AIHL) ===
- August 18, 2014: Melbourne Ice goaltender Jaden Pine-Murphy was credited with a shorthanded empty-net goal during a playoff game against the Newcastle North Stars.

=== Junior hockey ===
- January 7, 1987, Chris Clifford of the Kingston Canadians scored an empty-net goal against Toronto, becoming the first OHL goalie to score a goal
- While playing for the Medicine Hat Tigers, Chris Osgood scored an empty-net goal; as well, Olaf Kolzig scored a goal while with the Tri-City Americans
- April 20, 1993, Fred Brathwaite scored a goal while with the Detroit Jr. Red Wings
- February 21, 1997, the Muskoka Bears' Ryan Venturelli became the first Metro Junior Hockey League goalie to score two goals (both empty net) in a hockey game. The goals came in an 11–6 win against the Durham Huskies
- March 30, 2004, Justin Peters, then with the Toronto St. Michael's Majors, scored an empty-net goal during the playoffs against the Sudbury Wolves
- September 25, 2005, Antoine Lafleur of the P.E.I. Rocket was credited with an empty-net powerplay goal against the Halifax Mooseheads
- December 17, 2006, John Faulkner of the Sarnia Blast (currently in the UNO Mavericks) scored a shorthanded, empty-net goal, becoming the only junior B goalie to score a shorthanded goal.
- December 6, 2008, in two separate games, two different QMJHL goalies scored goals; Peter Delmas (Lewiston MAINEiacs) was credited with a goal against the Quebec Remparts and Maxim Gougeon (Rimouski Océanic) scored an empty-netter against the Cape Breton Screaming Eagles.
- June 2009, during a junior B playoff game, Brantford Golden Eagles goaltender Daryl Borden scored an empty-netter.
- April 23, 2012, Mark Visentin of the Niagara IceDogs scored an empty-net shorthanded goal during the playoffs against the Ottawa 67's.
- November 12, 2012, Gabriel Grunwald (Wisconsin Badgers Alumni) of the OJHL Georgetown Raiders became the first goalie in history to score an empty-net shorthanded goal, while also posting a shutout in the exact same game. This game was played against the Mississauga Chargers.
- April 8, 2013, George Sørensen of Denmark's national under-18 hockey team scored an empty-net shorthanded goal against France's national under-18 hockey team.
- During the 2014–15 QMJHL season, François Brassard became the first goaltender in league history to score two goals in one season. He scored his first on December 13, 2014, as a member of the Cape Breton Screaming Eagles, and he scored his second on February 28, 2015, as a member of the Gatineau Olympiques.
- October 9, 2015, Tyler Parsons of the London Knights was credited with an empty-net shorthanded goal against the Sudbury Wolves, which eventually stood as the game winner in a game London won 6–2.
- October 19, 2015, Sean Leahy of the WSHL's Salt Lake City Moose scored an empty net goal.
- March 18, 2016, Stuart Skinner of the Lethbridge Hurricanes scored an empty net goal.
- January 7, 2017, Étienne Montpetit of the Val-d'Or Foreurs scored a shorthanded empty net goal.
- January 14, 2017, Mathieu Bellemare of the Gatineau Olympiques was credited with a goal with the opposing goaltender in the net.
- February 18, 2017, Eric Stewardson of the PJHL's Blenheim Blades scored an empty net goal during the playoffs against the Lakeshore Canadiens.
- April 13, 2017, Dylan Wells of the Peterborough Petes scored an empty net goal during the playoffs against the Kingston Frontenacs.
- November 18, 2017, Mikhail Berdin of the USHL's Sioux Falls Stampede scored an empty net goal.
- December 19, 2017, Dawson Rodin of the WSHL's Utah Outliers scored an empty net goal.
- January 2, 2018, Nolan Hakr of the PJHL's Mooretown Flags scored an empty net goal against the Wallaceburg Lakers.
- January 18, 2018, Tristan Bérubé of the Gatineau Olympiques scored an empty net goal.
- February 15, 2019, Anthony Hurtubise of the GOJHL's St. Thomas Stars scored a double-overtime game-winning goal into an empty net against the Komoka Kings.
- March 10, 2020, Lukáš Pařík of the Spokane Chiefs scored an empty net goal against, as well as shut out, the Kamloops Blazers.
- April 30, 2021, Thomas Sigouin of the Québec Remparts scored an empty net goal in a playoff game against the Drummondville Voltigeurs.
- December 17, 2021, Antoine Coulombe of the Shawinigan Cataractes scored an empty net goal.
- April 6, 2023, Anson Thornton of the Barrie Colts scored an empty net goal in a playoff game against the Hamilton Bulldogs.
- October 20, 2023, Mathis Rousseau of the Halifax Mooseheads scored an empty net goal.
- November 26, 2023, Dawson Cowan of the Spokane Chiefs was credited with a goal against the Portland Winterhawks.
- December 1, 2023, Antoine Keller of the Acadie-Bathurst Titan was credited with a goal against the Chicoutimi Saguenéens after he shot the puck down the ice and it was deflected by a Chicoutimi player into his own net.
- December 1, 2023, Brett Fullerton of the OJHL's Haliburton County Huskies scored against the Wellington Dukes.
- January 26, 2024, Glen Crandall of the OJHL's Milton Menace scored an empty net goal against the Georgetown Raiders.
- November 14, 2024, Carter George of the Owen Sound Attack scored an empty net goal against the Peterborough Petes.
- November 16, 2024, Michael Newlove of the Georgetown Raiders scored an empty net goal against the North York Rangers.
- January 24, 2025, Nolan Lalonde of the Sault Ste. Marie Greyhounds scored an empty net goal against the Flint Firebirds.
- December 3, 2025, Xavier Wendt of the Tri-City Americans scored an empty net goal against, as well as shut out, the Swift Current Broncos.
- January 21, 2026, Carter George (Sault Ste. Marie Greyhounds) scored an empty net goal against the London Knights, becoming the first OHL goalie with two career goals.

== See also ==
- Breakaway (ice hockey)
- Centre
- Defenceman
- Forward
- Rover (ice hockey)
- Winger
- List of NHL players
- D-zone coverage
