= Matt Berlin =

Canadian ice hockey player (born 1998)

- Born: January 20, 1998 (age 27); Edmonton, Alberta, Canada
- Height: 6 ft 3 in (191 cm)
- Weight: 205 lb (93 kg; 14 st 9 lb)
- Position: Goaltender
- Caught: Left
- Played for: Edmonton Oilers
- NHL draft: Undrafted
- Playing career: 2023–2023

Matthew Berlin (born January 20, 1998) is a Canadian amateur ice hockey player. He appeared in one game for the Edmonton Oilers of the National Hockey League (NHL) in the 2022–23 season as an emergency goaltender who was put in a game against the Chicago Blackhawks on January 28, 2023, with 2:26 remaining in the game.

== Playing career ==
Berlin was drafted 148th overall by the Spokane Chiefs in the fifth round of the 2013 WHL Bantam Draft. In January 2016, he was reassigned to the Drayton Valley Thunder of the Alberta Junior Hockey League (AJHL) for the remainder of the 2015–16 season. The Chiefs traded Berlin to the Seattle Thunderbirds in October 2016, where he spent two seasons and amassed a 19–9–4–1 record. Berlin was traded to the Kootenay Ice in January 2018.

In the 2018–19 season, Berlin played as a starter for the AJHL Sherwood Park Crusaders, who had first acquired him from the Drayton Valley Thunder in 2016. After finishing the season with 28 wins in 38 games, he signed with the University of Alberta Golden Bears for the 2019–20 season.

Berlin was an emergency backup goalie for the Colorado Avalanche on April 22, 2022, against the Edmonton Oilers. On January 28, 2023, the Edmonton Oilers signed him to an amateur tryout contract, after regular goaltender Stuart Skinner was pulled from the lineup before game time due to illness. Berlin served as the backup to Jack Campbell and entered the game for the final 2 minutes in the Oilers' 7–3 win over the Chicago Blackhawks, saving his lone shot faced.

== Career statistics ==
=== Regular season and playoffs ===
			Regular season									Playoffs
Season	Team	League	GP	W	L	OTL	MIN	GA	SO	GAA	SV%	GP	W	L	MIN	GA	SO	GAA	SV%
2015–16	Spokane Chiefs	WHL	6	1	1	2	233	17	0	4.38	.851	—	—	—	—	—	—	—	—
2015–16	Drayton Valley Thunder	AJHL	16	5	8	0	816	61	1	4.49	.873	1	0	0	—	—	0	11.54	.615
2016–17	Spokane Chiefs	WHL	1	0	0	0	10	1	0	6.07	.750	—	—	—	—	—	—	—	—
2016–17	Seattle Thunderbirds	WHL	13	7	2	0	702	33	1	2.82	.902	—	—	—	—	—	—	—	—
2016–17	Sherwood Park Crusaders	AJHL	3	2	0	1	182	9	0	2.97	.902	—	—	—	—	—	—	—	—
2017–18	Seattle Thunderbirds	WHL	24	12	7	1	1,359	77	1	3.40	.893	—	—	—	—	—	—	—	—
2017–18	Kootenay Ice	WHL	13	3	8	1	729	44	0	3.62	.875	—	—	—	—	—	—	—	—
2018–19	Sherwood Park Crusaders	AJHL	38	28	9	1	2,267	97	3	2.59	.917	12	6	6	—	—	1	3.11	.911
2019–20	University of Alberta	CIS	15	10	4	0	814	26	3	1.92	.907	2	1	1	118	3	0	1.53	.923
2021–22	University of Alberta	CIS	6	1	2	0	249	9	0	2.17	.917	—	—	—	—	—	—	—	—
2022–23	Edmonton Oilers	NHL	1	0	0	0	3	0	0	0.00	1.000	—	—	—	—	—	—	—	—
2022–23	University of Alberta	CIS	6	4	1	0	319	14	0	2.63	.888	—	—	—	—	—	—	—	—
2023–24	University of Alberta	CIS	16	12	1	2	882	43	0	2.93	.895	—	—	—	—	—	—	—	—
NHL totals			1	0	0	0	3	0	0	0.00	1.000	—	—	—	—	—	—	—	—

== See also ==
- Emergency backup goaltender
- List of players who played only one game in the NHL
