= David Ayres =

Canadian ice hockey player (born 1977)

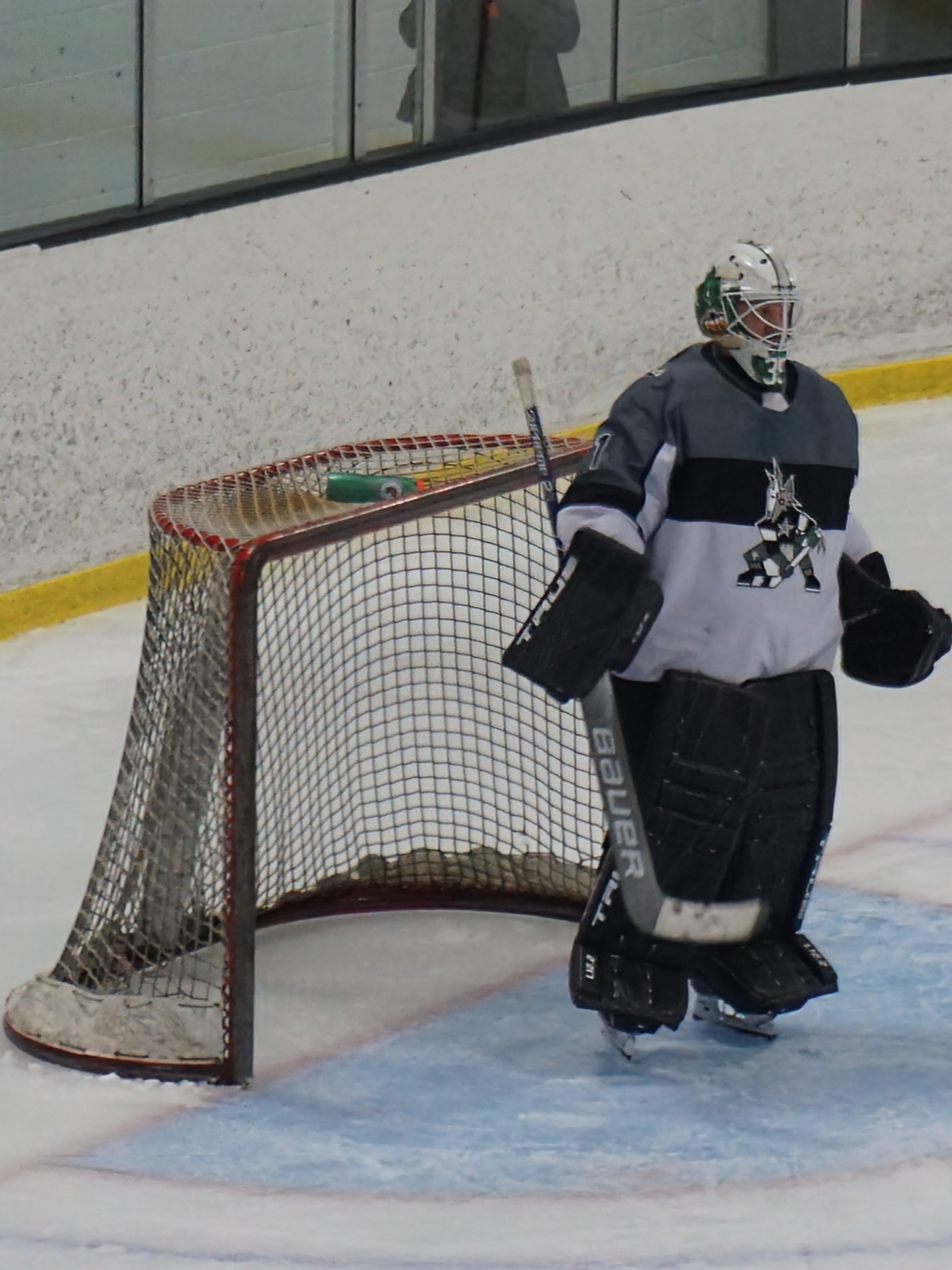
- David Ayres playing for the Richmond Hill Coyotes of the Ontario Super Hockey League.
- Born: August 12, 1977 (age 49) Whitby, Ontario, Canada
- Height: 6 ft 0 in (183 cm)
- Weight: 201 lb (91 kg; 14 st 5 lb)
- Position: Goaltender
- Caught: Left
- Played for: Carolina Hurricanes
- NHL draft: Undrafted
- Playing career: 2014–2015; 2020

David Ayres (/ɛərz/; born August 12, 1977) is a Canadian former professional ice hockey goaltender. He is the first emergency backup goaltender to be credited with a win in the National Hockey League (NHL). At age 42, Ayres is also the oldest NHL goaltender to win his regular season debut.

Ayres played professionally for the Norwood Vipers of Allan Cup Hockey (ACH) from 2014 to 2015 before retiring. While working as a building operator for the Toronto Maple Leafs in 2020, Ayres was named the emergency goaltender for the Carolina Hurricanes against the Maple Leafs and helped Carolina win the game. He later served as the head coach of the Vermilion County Bobcats in the Southern Professional Hockey League (SPHL) in 2022 and the Port Perry Lumberjacks of the Provincial Junior Hockey League (PJHL) from 2022 to 2023.

== Early and personal life ==
Ayres is a native of Whitby, Ontario and played youth ice hockey and attended hockey camps in the town. His late father, Bob, and his brother, Chris, were also goaltenders. He became ill and required a kidney transplant (donated by his mother, Mary) in 2004. In 2017, Ayres married his wife, Sarah. In 2022, Sarah announced that they had separated and she filed for divorce.

Ayres worked as a building operator at Ricoh Coliseum (now Coca-Cola Coliseum) in Toronto, which is the home arena for the Toronto Marlies, the American Hockey League farm team of the Toronto Maple Leafs. As his job responsibilities occasionally included maintenance and operation of an ice resurfacer, he was referenced as a Zamboni driver in news articles about his NHL debut. The Marlies' equipment man learned that Ayres was a goalie and coach, so head coach Sheldon Keefe began playing him as a goaltender at practice when an extra man was needed, as did the Maple Leafs.

== Hockey career ==
Ayres played eight games with the Norwood Vipers of the Allan Cup Hockey League in 2014. As a goaltender, he allowed 58 goals, had a .777 save percentage and posted an 0–8 record. Ayres has served as a backup to both the Toronto Marlies and Charlotte Checkers in the American Hockey League, the primary affiliates of the Toronto Maple Leafs and Carolina Hurricanes, respectively.

=== NHL appearance ===
On February 22, 2020, both of the Carolina Hurricanes' goaltenders, James Reimer and Petr Mrázek, were injured during a game against the Maple Leafs. Ayres entered the game during the second period as the emergency backup goaltender after signing a one-game contract with the NHL. Donning Kasimir Kaskisuo's old Toronto Marlies helmet and pads and wearing a Maple Leafs T-shirt under his equipment, he entered the game at 8:41 left in the second period with a 3–1 lead. He allowed goals on the first two shots that he faced before stopping the next eight shots on goal to help seal a 6–3 win for Carolina. He became the first emergency backup to enter a game in the NHL since Scott Foster had done so in 2018. The Hurricanes celebrated by spraying water on Ayres after the game. He became the oldest goaltender (at 42 years, 194 days) to win his NHL regular-season debut, breaking a record that had been held by Hugh Lehman since 1927, and his game-used goalie stick was sent to the Hockey Hall of Fame.

Ayres was named first star of the game and kept his game-worn jersey and game puck. Had Ayres signed a professional tryout agreement, he would have been paid $500 for the game, but under the terms of his contract, he was not paid. Reimer gave him an autographed goalie stick, and Rod Brind'Amour, Carolina's coach, gave him an autographed bottle of wine. Hurricanes forward Sebastian Aho stated that teammates had pooled a small sum of money for Ayres. Ontario premier Doug Ford phoned Ayres to congratulate him.

Following the game, the Hurricanes announced that they would sell T-shirts with Ayres' name and jersey number 90, with royalties paid to Ayres and a portion of the proceeds donated to a kidney foundation.

Ayres was invited to sound the siren at the start of the Hurricanes' home game on February 25. While in North Carolina, governor Roy Cooper declared Ayres, a Canadian citizen, an honorary citizen of North Carolina, and Raleigh honoured him by naming February 25, 2020 David Ayres Day in the city.

== Post-hockey career ==
On October 5, 2021, it was announced that Ayres had joined the CBD company CaniBrands as a brand ambassador.

On October 26, 2021, the Carolina Hurricanes announced that James Corden's Fulwell 73 production company would create a film based on Ayres’ story that would become a Disney feature film. It was also expected that Ayres would play himself in several scenes, but the film was not produced when the rights to the story expired.

Ayres made his coaching debut as head coach of the SPHL’s Vermilion County Bobcats on April 7, 2022, against the Evansville Thunderbolts at the Ford Center, but was replaced by season's end.

On August 12, 2022, the Port Perry Lumberjacks announced Ayres as their head coach for the 2022–23 season. After posting a 10–28–4 record and being swept in the first round of the playoffs by the Uxbridge Bruins, he was not invited to return for the 2023–24 season.

== Career statistics ==
=== Regular season ===
| | | | Regular season |
| Season | Team | League | GP | W | L | OTL | TOI | SA | GA | SO | GAA | SV% |
|---|---|---|---|---|---|---|---|---|---|---|---|---|
| 2014–15 | Norwood Vipers | ACH | 8 | 0 | 8 | 0 | — | 260 | 58 | 0 | 8.88 | .777 |
| 2019–20 | Carolina Hurricanes | NHL | 1 | 1 | 0 | 0 | 28:41 | 10 | 2 | 0 | 4.18 | .800 |
| NHL totals | | | 1 | 1 | 0 | 0 | 28:41 | 10 | 2 | 0 | 4.18 | .800 |

== See also ==
- Jorge Alves (ice hockey) – Carolina Hurricanes equipment manager who played as a backup goalie in 2016
- Matt Berlin – Backup goalie and college student who played for the Edmonton Oilers in 2023
- Scott Foster (ice hockey) – Backup goalie and accountant who played for the Chicago Blackhawks in 2017
- Tom Hodges (ice hockey) – Backup goalie and life insurance salesman who played for the Anaheim Ducks in 2022
- Lester Patrick – former New York Rangers coach who, at age 44, played in the 1928 Stanley Cup Finals for the team as an emergency goalie
- Steve Dangle - Canadian sports analyst, author, and Maple Leafs super fan, known for his meltdown over Ayres' appearance in aforementioned Hurricanes vs. Maple Leafs game
- List of players who played only one game in the NHL
