= 2025–26 GOHL season =

- League: Greater Ontario Hockey League
- Sport: Hockey
- Games: 575
- Teams: 23
- Total attendance: 245,780
- Streaming partner: FloSports
- Regular Season: Cambridge Redhawks

Playoffs
- Eastern champions: Cambridge Redhawks
- Eastern runners-up: St. Catharines Falcons
- Western champions: St. Marys Lincolns
- Western runners-up: Stratford Warriors

Sutherland Cup
- Champions: Cambridge Redhawks
- Runners-up: St. Marys Lincolns
- Finals MVP: Aidan Hill

GOHL seasons
- ← 2024–25 GOJHL 2026–27 GOHL →

The 2025–26 GOHL season is the 18th season of the Greater Ontario Hockey League. The league began play on September 10, 2025 and concluded on March 8, 2026. The post-season began on March 13, 2026 and concluded on May 2, 2026.

The winner of the playoffs will win the Sutherland Cup. On May 2, 2026, the Cambridge Redhawks defeated the St. Marys Lincolns in five games to win the franchise's first Sutherland Cup.

== Team Changes ==
- The Kitchener-Waterloo Siskins rebrand back to the Waterloo Siskins

== Regular season ==
=== Rebranding and affiliation ===
In September 2025, the GOJHL became the first development league for the Ontario Hockey League (OHL). In the same month, the GOJHL was renamed to the Greater Ontario Hockey League (GOHL) as part of rebranding with the OHL.

=== Expansion ===
On March 5, 2026, the GOHL announced that the league would be adding the Woodstock Navy Vets as an expansion team in the 2026-27 GOHL season.

=== Final standings ===
Note: GP = Games played; W = Wins; L = Losses; OTL = Overtime losses; SL = Shootout losses; GF = Goals for; GA = Goals against; PTS = Points

==== Western Conference ====
Rank	Team	GP	W	L	OTL	T	Pts	GF	GA
1	Chatham Maroons	50	37	8	2	3	79	243	146
2	Elmira Sugar Kings	50	37	10	2	1	77	233	139
3	St. Marys Lincolns	50	36	11	3	0	75	209	120
4	Stratford Warriors	50	30	13	4	3	67	183	133
5	London Nationals	50	32	16	1	1	66	223	169
6	Strathroy Rockets	50	26	21	2	1	55	185	183
7	LaSalle Vipers	50	25	22	3	0	53	188	180
8	St. Thomas Stars	50	24	23	2	1	51	189	189
9	Waterloo Siskins	50	22	22	4	2	50	150	148
10	Listowel Cyclones	50	20	27	2	1	43	146	164
11	Komoka Kings	50	16	31	2	1	35	162	218
12	Sarnia Legionnaires	50	0	50	0	0	0	83	341

==== Eastern Conference ====
Rank	Team	GP	W	L	OTL	T	Pts	GF	GA
1	Cambridge Redhawks	50	45	5	0	0	90	262	117
2	St. Catharines Falcons	50	42	6	2	0	86	218	113
3	Fort Erie Meteors	50	39	9	2	0	80	218	109
4	Pelham Panthers	50	32	17	0	1	65	191	128
5	Port Colborne Sailors	50	27	18	4	1	59	175	145
6	Brantford Titans	50	20	25	3	2	45	170	192
7	Ayr Centennials	50	19	27	2	2	42	164	199
8	Caledonia Corvairs	50	18	27	5	0	41	161	180
9	Hamilton Kilty B's	50	16	28	6	0	38	125	178
10	Welland Jr. Canadians	50	7	40	3	0	17	124	301
11	Caledon Bombers	50	5	45	0	0	10	107	317

== Statistics ==
=== Scoring leaders ===
Note: GP = Games played; G = Goals; A = Assists; Pts = Points; PIM = Penalty minutes

Player	Team	GP	G	A	Pts	PIM
Sam Tonelli	Fort Erie Meteors	50	30	58	88	58
Kyle Morey	Elmira Sugar Kings	50	28	58	86	66
Reid Gammage	Cambridge Redhawks	48	32	50	82	45
Jake Ritson	Strathroy Rockets	47	24	48	72	20
Austen Pomerleau	London Nationals	46	30	41	71	25
Brendan Gerber	Elmira Sugar Kings	50	32	35	67	32
Zachary LeBlanc	Strathroy Rockets	46	29	38	67	28
Cameron Fries	Cambridge Redhawks	49	29	37	66	53
Danny Adamo	Fort Erie Meteors	47	29	34	63	36
Ryan Hodkinson	St. Marys Lincolns	48	16	47	63	76

=== Leading goaltenders ===
Note: GP = Games played; Mins = Minutes played; W = Wins; L = Losses: OTL = Overtime losses;
T = Ties; GA = Goals Allowed; SO = Shutouts; GAA = Goals Against Average

Player	Team	GP	MINS	W	L	OTL	T	GA	SO	Sv%	GAA
Finn Moffett	Fort Erie Meteors	21	1206	15	3	2	0	40	2	0.926	1.99
Aidan Hill	Cambridge Redhawks	23	1362	21	1	0	0	48	2	0.915	2.11
Gage Hurst	Stratford Warriors	20	1123	12	1	3	0	41	1	0.895	2.19
Brogan Colquhoun	St. Marys Lincolns	23	1367	16	6	1	0	50	2	0.927	2.19
Vaughn Barr	St. Marys Lincolns	18	1045	13	3	1	0	39	3	0.924	2.24

== 2026 Sutherland Cup Playoffs ==
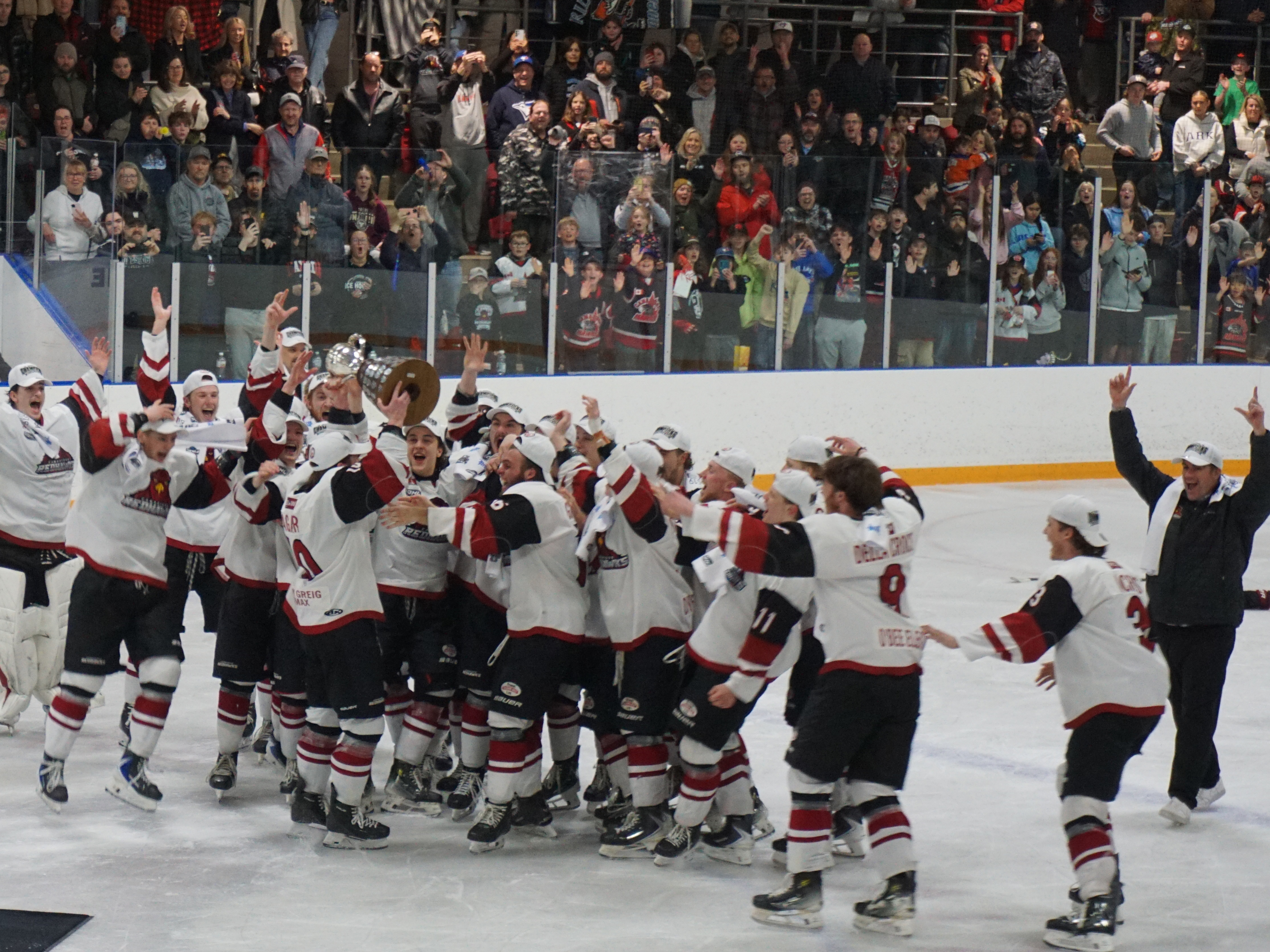
The Cambridge Redhawks winning the 2026 Sutherland Cup at the Galt Arena Gardens in Cambridge, Ontario.

Conference Quarterfinal	Conference Semifinal
1	Chatham	4
8	St. Thomas	0
1	Chatham	1
4	Stratford	4
4	Stratford	4
5	London	3
West
2	Elmira	4
7	LaSalle	2
2	Elmira	2
3	St. Mary's	4
3	St. Mary's	4
6	Strathroy	1
1	Cambridge	4
8	Caledonia	0
1	Cambridge	4
4	Pelham	0
4	Pelham	4
5	Port Colborne	0
East
2	St. Catharines	4
7	Ayr	1
2	St. Catharines	4
3	Fort Erie	3
3	Fort Erie	4
6	Brantford	0

Conference Final
4	Stratford	3
3	St. Mary's	4
1	Cambridge	4
2	St. Catharines	0

Final
3	St. Mary's	1
1	Cambridge	4
