= Brantford Titans =

- City: Brantford, Ontario, Canada
- League: Greater Ontario Hockey League
- Division: Mid-Western
- Founded: 2013
- Home arena: Wayne Gretzky Sports Centre
- Colours: Black, gold, brown and White
- Owners: Jon Clark and Mike Christian
- General manager: Daniel Fitzgerald
- Head coach: Daniel Fitzgerald

Franchise history
- 2013-2019: Brantford 99ers
- 2019-2024: Brantford Bandits
- 2024-Present: Brantford Titans

The Brantford Titans are a Canadian junior ice hockey team based in Brantford, Ontario, Canada. They play in the Eastern Conference of the Greater Ontario Hockey League.

== History ==
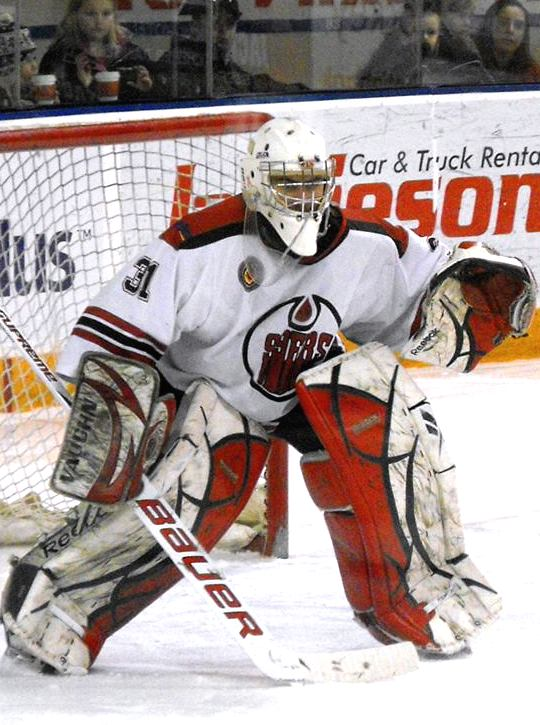
99ers goalie during 2013-14 season.

For years, the Brantford Eagles franchise were not very successful. From 1992 until 2002, the Eagles were only able to surpass ten wins once. Most of that time, the team had been transplanted to Ohsweken, Ontario. In 2002, the team moved back to Brantford and began winning more consistently. By the 2005-06 season, the Eagles made the Mid-Western League final. In 2007, the three Ontario Hockey Association Junior B Leagues merged into the GOJHL. From that point on, the Eagles would win three Mid-Western regular season championships, three Mid-Western Conference playoff championships, and the 2009 Sutherland Cup as Ontario Champions. But the fans did not come. On May 23, 2012, the Eagles were official moved to Caledonia, Ontario and became the Caledonia Corvairs.

In 2012, the GOJHL announced it was recruiting new teams for a new Toronto-based fourth conference for the league. In Spring 2013, the plan would unceremoniously die, but a Brantford group that had decided to apply for entry transferred their request to the Mid-Western Conference. Their request was accepted and the ownership group named themselves the 99'ers in honour of Wayne Gretzky and the Brantford Minor Hockey Association.

On September 6, 2013, the 99ers played their first ever game, on the road, against the Brampton Bombers. Luc Hartholt scored the first goal in franchise history at 2:29 of the first period in a 4-3 win. Andre Keire made 20 saves to pick up the first ever win in net.

The team would announce on their twitter page on May 28, 2019 that they were being renamed the Brantford Bandits, and home games were moved to the Brantford Civic Centre.

In May 2023, the Bandits were purchased by a group of seven beer league buddies. They have moved the team's home games from the Brantford Civic Centre back to the Wayne Gretzky Sports Centre.

April 2024 the Bandit owners acquired ownership of the Cambridge Redhawks. In an offsetting action, Jon Clark and Mike Christian, owners of the Paris Titans purchased the Brantford Bandits and re-branded the team to the Brantford Titans.

== Season-by-season results ==
Season	GP	W	L	T	OTL	GF	GA	P	Results	Playoffs
Brantford 99ers
2013–14	49	7	38	-	4	118	251	18	9th GOJHL-MW	DNQ
2014–15	49	9	39	-	1	128	258	19	9th GOJHL-MW	DNQ
2015–16	50	13	32	3	2	133	204	31	8th of 9-MW; 22nd of 26-GOJHL	Lost Conf. Quarterfinals, 1-4 (Dutchmen)
2016–17	50	11	32	2	5	143	217	29	8th of 9-MW; 22nd of 27-GOJHL	Lost Conf. Quarterfinals, 0-4 (Cyclones)
2017–18	50	13	30	2	5	139	216	33	7th of 8-MW; 20th of 26-GOJHL	Lost Conf. Quarterfinals, 0-4 (Warriors)
2018–19	48	8	34	0	6	114	215	22	8th of 8-MW; 23rd of 25-GOJHL	Lost Conf. Quarterfinals, 0-4 (Cyclones)
Brantford Bandits
2019–20	50	6	39	0	5	90	225	17	8th of 8-MW; 25th of 26-GOJHL	Lost Conf. Quarterfinals, 0-4 (Sugar Kings)
2020-21	Season lost due to covid-19 pandemic									
2021–22	48	8	36	4	0	78	221	20	8th of 8-MW; 24th of 25-GOJHL	Lost Conf. Quarterfinals, 1-4 (Sugar Kings)
2022–23	50	2	45	3	0	78	360	7	8th of 8-MW; 25th of 25-GOJHL	Lost Conf. Quarterfinals, 0-4 (Siskins)
2023–24	50	11	37	2	0	122	223	24	7th of 8-MW; 21st of 23-GOJHL	Lost Conf. Quarterfinals, 1-4 (Warriors)
Brantford Titans
2024–25	50	20	22	7	1	156	171	48	7th of 11-East Conf; 16th of 23-GOJHL	Won Conf. Quarterfinals, 4-3 (Centennials); Lost Conf Semifinal 0-4 (Falcons)
2025–26	50	20	25	3	2	170	192	45	6th of 11-East Conf; 15th of 23-GOJHL	Lost Conf. Quarterfinals, 0-4 (Meteors)

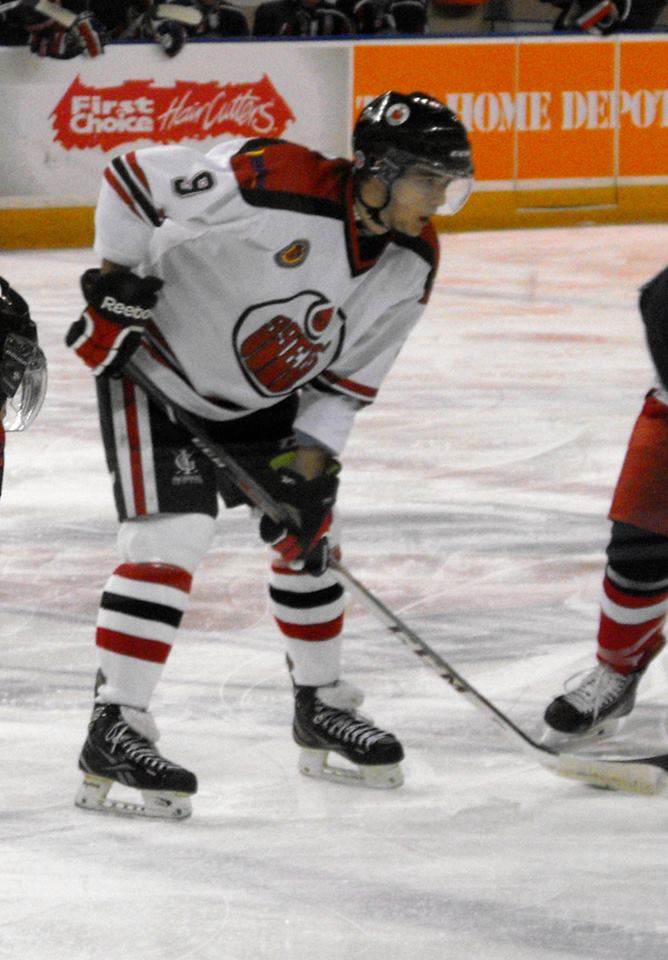
99ers player during 2013-14 season.

== Notable alumni ==
- Nathan Bastian
