= Petrolia Jets =

- City: Petrolia, Ontario, Canada
- League: Great Lakes Junior C Hockey League/ Western Ontario Hockey League/ Greater Ontario Junior Hockey League
- Operated: c. 1960–2008
- Home arena: Petrolia Arena
- Colours: Red, Yellow, and White
- General manager: Brian Sukarukoff
- Head coach: Craig Warwick
- Affiliates: London Knights (OHL); Lambeth Lancers (SOJHL)

Franchise history
- 1960–2008: Petrolia Jets
- 2008-2017: Lambton Shores Predators
- 2017-present: Komoka Kings

The Petrolia Jets were a junior ice hockey team based in Petrolia, Ontario, Canada. They played in the Western division of the Greater Ontario Junior Hockey League, the Western Ontario Hockey League, and the Great Lakes Junior C Hockey League.

== History ==
During the 1960s, the Petrolia Jets participated in a loosely ran Bluewater League that was sometimes classified as a junior league depending on how competitive its teams felt. From 1967, the Jets were permanently a junior hockey club. In 1968 and 1969 made it to the league final, but failed to win. Starting in the 1970, the Jets would win the regional Junior B championship and play for the OHA Sutherland Cup championship.

In 1972, the Great Lakes Junior C Hockey League would revert permanently to Junior C hockey, and the Jets jumped to the more broad and competitive Western Ontario Junior B Hockey League. The Jets would not enjoy much success in the WOHL and returned to the GLJHL in 1984. Despite five great regular seasons in Junior C, the Jets would never even make the GLJHL final and returned to the WOHL in 1989.

Despite winning the WOHL regular season crown in 1995 and the league's playoff title in 2003, the Jets success in the box office dwindled over the years. In the late 2000s on-ice success disappeared, and the team was moved to Forest, Ontario and renamed the Lambton Shores Predators because of competition for fans from the neighbouring Sarnia Sting

== Season-by-season results ==
Season	GP	W	L	T	OTL	GF	GA	P	Results	Playoffs
1967-68	24	11	8	5	-	124	111	27	3rd BWJHL	Lost Jr. C Final
1968-69	31	18	9	4	-	150	101	40	4th BCJHL	Lost Jr. B Final
1969-70	34	26	8	0	-	180	89	52	1st BCJHL	"B" Champions
1970-71	40	31	8	1	-	384	167	63	1st GLJHL	"B" Champions
1971-72	36	32	3	1	-	288	121	65	1st GLJHL	"B" Champions
1972-73	42	18	16	8	-	217	203	44	3rd WOJHL	
1973-74	40	11	25	4	-	156	232	26	4th WOJHL	
1974-75	40	19	17	4	-	196	187	42	3rd WOJHL	
1975-76	39	21	10	8	-	220	172	50	3rd WOJHL	
1976-77	40	16	16	8	-	183	191	40	4th WOJHL	
1977-78	40	22	12	6	-	216	161	50	2nd WOJHL	
1978-79	42	27	11	4	-	295	199	58	3rd WOJHL	
1979-80	41	11	28	2	-	182	259	24	6th WOJHL	
1980-81	42	17	19	6	-	214	210	40	6th WOJHL	
1981-82	42	15	25	2	-	150	210	32	5th WOJHL	
1982-83	42	13	25	4	-	192	231	30	7th WOJHL	
1983-84	48	11	36	1	-	200	360	23	8th WOJHL	
1984-85	39	19	9	11	-	207	135	49	4th GLJHL	
1985-86	40	19	15	6	-	211	181	44	4th GLJHL	
1986-87	39	30	6	1	2	242	137	63	1st GLJHL	
1987-88	39	26	11	1	1	216	149	54	2nd GLJHL	
1988-89	40	30	9	1	0	244	141	61	2nd GLJHL	
1989-90	40	14	19	6	1	173	188	35	7th WOJHL	
1990-91	48	28	18	1	1	231	179	58	5th WOJHL	
1991-92	50	18	25	6	1	196	237	43	4th WOJHL West	
1992-93	52	21	24	3	4	-	-	49	4th WOJHL West	
1993-94	50	24	22	3	1	253	245	52	4th WOJHL West	Lost Final
1994-95	52	39	11	0	2	324	196	80	1st WOJHL West	
1995-96	52	26	20	6	0	225	221	58	3rd WOJHL West	
1996-97	52	32	18	2	0	245	188	66	3rd WOJHL West	
1997-98	52	23	20	5	4	205	193	55	3rd WOJHL West	
1998-99	52	33	14	0	5	241	175	71	3rd WOJHL West	
1999-00	54	23	25	0	6	191	219	52	7th GOHL	
2000-01	54	35	13	2	4	194	132	76	3rd GOHL	
2001-02	54	34	16	1	3	228	169	72	4th WOJHL	
2002-03	48	28	19	0	1	200	156	57	4th WOJHL	Won League
2003-04	48	30	14	1	3	180	148	64	3rd WOJHL	
2004-05	48	12	31	3	2	122	210	29	9th WOJHL	
2005-06	48	26	15	2	5	149	149	59	4th WOJHL	Lost Semi Final
2006-07	48	7	37	-	4	139	302	18	9th WOJHL	DNQ
2007-08	48	7	37	-	4	138	303	18	9th GOJHL-W	DNQ

== Notable alumni ==
- Todd Bidner
- John Van Boxmeer
- Brian Campbell
- Scott Foster
- Bobby Gould
- Brett Graham
- Tim Hrynewich
- Dale Hunter
- Mark Hunter
- Michael Leighton
- Steve Mason
- Pat Verbeek
- Paul Ysebaert
