= Greater Ontario Hockey League =

Canadian junior ice hockey league (founded 2007)

- Current season, competition or edition: 2025-26 GOHL season
- Sport: Ice hockey
- Founded: 2007
- Commissioner: Craig Spada
- No. of teams: 23
- Country: Canada
- Headquarters: London, Ontario
- Most recent champions: Cambridge Redhawks (1st title)
- Most titles: Caledonia Corvairs (4)
- Broadcaster: FloSports
- Website: gojhl.ca

The Greater Ontario Hockey League (GOHL) is a Canadian junior ice hockey league based in Southern Ontario, Canada. The league is sanctioned by the Ontario Hockey Association (OHA), Ontario Hockey Federation, and Hockey Canada. The league is considered Junior B by the OHA despite several attempts to be promoted to Junior A.

Established as the Greater Ontario Junior Hockey League (GOJHL) in 2007, it was created through merging the Western Ontario Hockey League, Mid-Western Junior Hockey League, and Golden Horseshoe Junior Hockey League, to dissuade perceived player raiding from teams in the then-Ontario Provincial Junior A Hockey League. The twenty-three teams of the Greater Ontario Junior Hockey League come from Southwestern Ontario and the Golden Horseshoe.

In September 2025, the GOJHL became the development league for the Ontario Hockey League, and was renamed to the Greater Ontario Hockey League.

== History ==
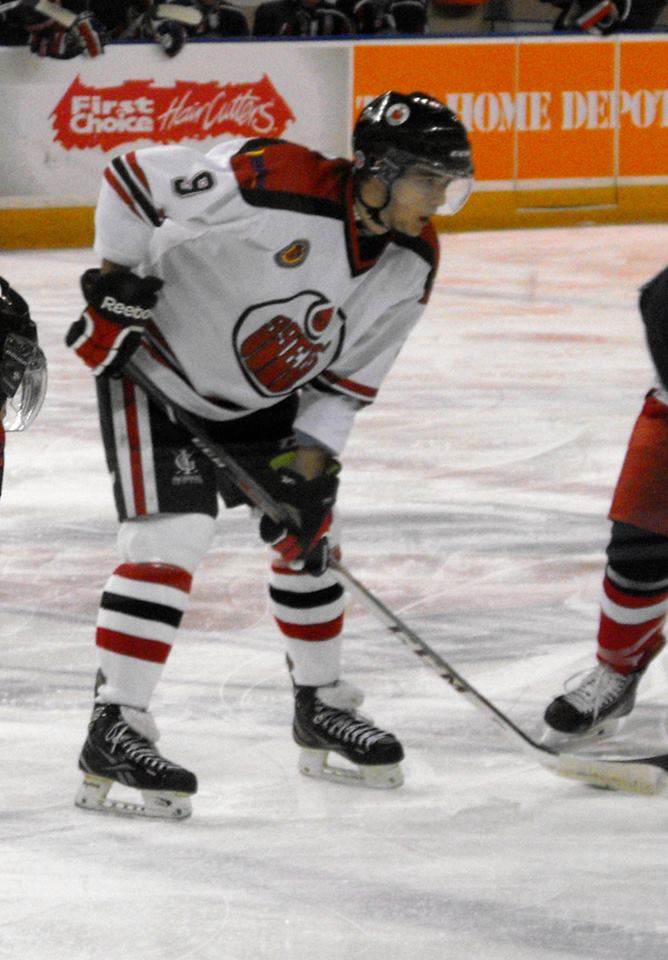
Brantford 99ers player during 2013–14 season.

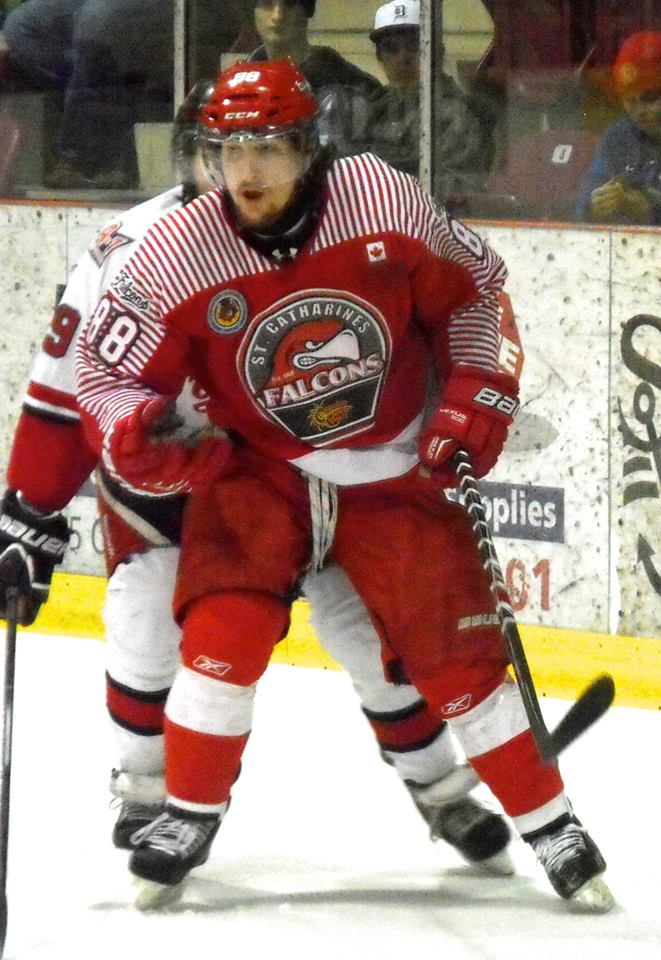
St. Catharines Falcons player 2014 playoffs.

In the late 1990s, the Western Ontario Junior B Hockey League began complaining about their top level players being pulled from their teams at trade deadline time by Ontario Provincial Junior A Hockey League clubs without permission or compensation. A common view in Southern Ontario Junior B circles is that Junior "A" and Junior "B" are approximately the same skill level. In fact the OPJHL was known as the Central Ontario Junior B Hockey League until 1993, as well the Metro Junior A Hockey League which folded in 1998 was a Junior "B" league until 1991.

During the 2006–07 season, the general managers of all Ontario Hockey Association Junior "B" teams came together and voted unanimously to merge and create the Greater Ontario Junior Hockey League (GOJHL) effective for the 2007–08 season. The GOJHL will become the sole competing body of the Sutherland Cup, which had as many as eight leagues competing for it at one time.

The 2007–08 season did not begin as planned. The management of the Mid-Western league resigned and needed to be replaced, and with a lack of organization due to the short time the new management had to get organized, the MWJHL had to opt out of an interlocking schedule. As a result, the entire GOJHL went without an interlocking schedule for 2007–08. The 2008–09 season saw the complete liquidation of all three divisional managements and a single governing body was put in place for the league. Additionally, inter-divisional play would also commence.

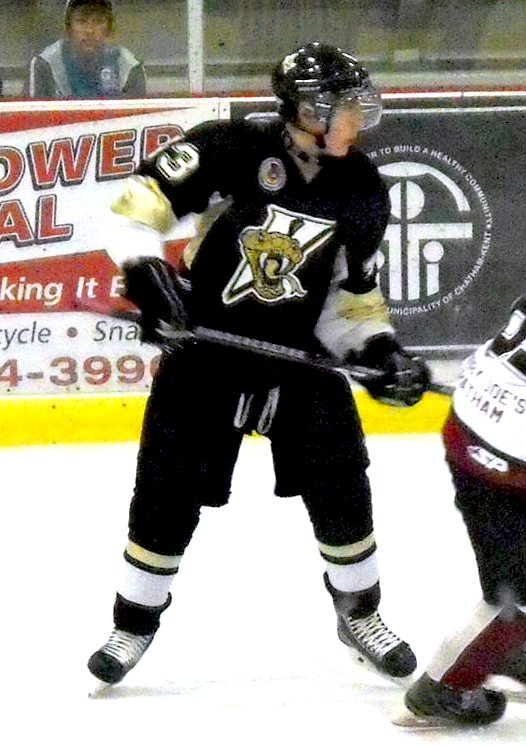
LaSalle Vipers forward on road (October 2013).

In the future, the league has stated that it will pursue club expansion, a reconfiguration that will move the league from three to four divisions, and possibly a move to join the Canadian Junior A Hockey League in future years.

On September 8, 2007, the Cambridge Winterhawks and the Guelph Dominators played the first ever game since the inception of the GOJHL. Despite leading 2–0 and outshooting Guelph, the defending Sutherland Cup Champions allowed five unanswered goals to drop the game 5–2. On May 3, 2008, the Tecumseh Chiefs finished a four-game sweep of the Elmira Sugar Kings to win the first ever GOJHL championship.

On September 24, 2008, the GOJHL hosted its first interdivisional regular season game between the Golden Horseshoe's Wheatfield Jr. Blades and the Western's London Nationals in London, Ontario. The Nationals won the game 6–2.

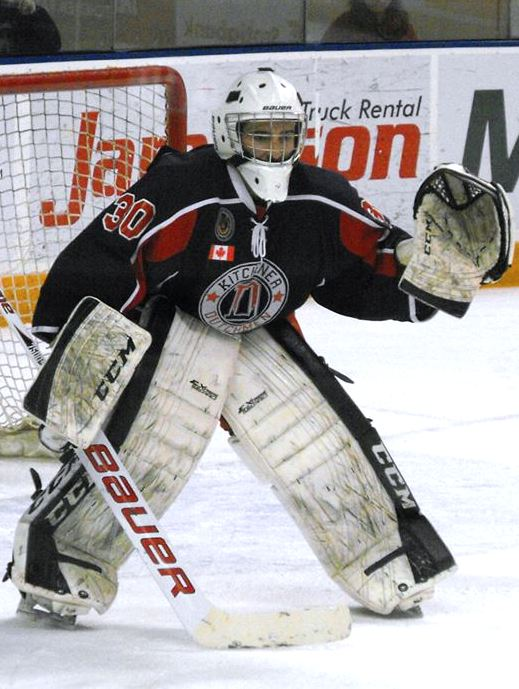
Kitchener Dutchmen goalie during the 2013–14 season.

The LaSalle Vipers, 2010 Sutherland Cup champions, were asked to represent the Ontario Hockey Association and Hockey Canada for "Canada Day" in Mexico. On December 16, 2010, the Vipers played the Mexico Under-20 National Team and defeated them 9–2 in Mexico City. In January 2011, the GOJHL's Golden Horseshoe Conference and Midwestern Conference hosted the Russian Minor Hockey League's "Red Stars" who did not make their Under-20 Team. On January 1, the MHL Red Stars defeated the Golden Horseshoe Conference 7–4 and on January 3, the Red Stars defeated the Midwestern Conference 11–3. The MHL is Russia's top tier Junior league, while each conference of the GOJHL is a third of Southern Ontario's third-tier of Junior hockey.

On October 10, 2012, the OHA announced its intention to expand east of Guelph and form a new fourth conference for the GOJHL. The announcement comes on the heels of the relocation of the Owen Sound Greys to Brampton by their sponsor, leaving the northerly city out of OHA junior hockey for the first time in ninety-nine years (not including wartime). In January 2014, the OHA announced that the plan to expand was on hold due to lack of serious parties. They announced that of eleven applicants, only four were substantial enough to play in the league. A Brantford group applied for expansion none-the-less, while the other three parties are currently in limbo. The Brantford group was approved for membership into the Midwestern Conference as the Brantford 99'ers.

On March 28, 2014, the GOJHL's representatives filed for promotion from Junior B to Junior A with the Ontario Hockey Association. The matter was discussed at the OHA head office on April 5, 2014. A few weeks later, the OHA rejected the promotion and the GOJHL's chairman was dismissed by the OHA. During the 2014–15 season, the Golden Horseshoe Conference held a vote to determine their future with the GOJHL. The teams voted to leave the GOJHL with OHA approval and govern autonomously from the league. In retaliation, the GOJHL invited no players from the Golden Horseshoe to the league's all-star game, forcing the Golden Horseshoe to play their own game in short order late in the season. The GOJHL playoff format remains unchanged for 2015 despite the shuffle. Before the playoffs began in 2015, the GOJHL announced that the Golden Horseshoe had rejoined the fold and that its annexation was averted.

In early May 2017, the Cambridge Winterhawks announced their intentions to sever ties with the OHA, stating that they would not be part of the GOJHL going forward. The GOJHL initial response was to withhold comment until further details could be established.

In June 2024, the GOJHL announced new realigned conferences, moving to an "East/West" format from the long standing 3 conference arrangement.

In September 2025, the GOJHL became the first development league for the Ontario Hockey League (OHL). In the same month, the GOJHL was renamed to the Greater Ontario Hockey League (GOHL) as part of rebranding with the OHL.

== Teams ==
Locations of teams competing in the 2026–27 season
1W Chatham Maroons
1E Ayr Centennials
2W Elmira Sugar Kings
2E Brantford Titans
3E Caledonia Corvairs
3W Komoka Kings
4W LaSalle Vipers
4E Cambridge Redhawks
5W Listowel Cyclones
5E Fort Erie Meteors
6W London Nationals
6E Hamilton Steel
7W Sarnia Legionnaires
7E Pelham Panthers
8W St. Marys Lincolns
8E Port Colborne Sailors
9W St. Thomas Stars
9E St. Catharines Falcons
10E Stoney Creek Generals
10W Stratford Warriors
11E Waterloo Siskins
11W Strathroy Rockets
12W Woodstock Navy-Vets
12E Welland Jr. Canadians

Western Conference
Team	City	Arena	Founded
Chatham Maroons	Chatham, Ontario	Chatham Memorial Arena	1959
Elmira Sugar Kings	Elmira, Ontario	Woolwich Memorial Centre	1987
Komoka Kings	Komoka, Ontario	Komoka Wellness Centre	2017
LaSalle Vipers	LaSalle, Ontario	Vollmer Culture and Recreation Complex	1970
Listowel Cyclones	Listowel, Ontario	Steve Kerr Memorial Complex	1972
London Nationals	London, Ontario	Western Fair District Sports Centre	1950
Sarnia Legionnaires	Sarnia, Ontario	Pat Stapleton Arena	1969
St. Marys Lincolns	St. Marys, Ontario	Pyramid Recreation Complex	1956
St. Thomas Stars	St. Thomas, Ontario	Joe Thornton Community Centre	1961
Stratford Warriors	Stratford, Ontario	William Allman Memorial Arena	1962
Strathroy Rockets	Strathroy, Ontario	West Middlesex Memorial Arena	1965
Woodstock Navy-Vets	Woodstock, Ontario	Woodstock District Community Complex	2026
Eastern Conference
Team	City	Arena	Founded
Ayr Centennials	Ayr, Ontario	North Dumfries Community Complex	2020
Brantford Titans	Brantford, Ontario	Wayne Gretzky Sports Centre	2013
Caledonia Corvairs	Caledonia, Ontario	Haldimand County Caledonia Centre	1970
Cambridge Redhawks	Cambridge, Ontario	Galt Arena Gardens	2018
Fort Erie Meteors	Fort Erie, Ontario	Fort Erie Leisureplex	1957
Hamilton Steel	Hamilton, Ontario	Dave Andreychuk Mountain Arena & Skating Centre	1974
Pelham Panthers	Pelham, Ontario	Meridian Community Centre	2014
Port Colborne Sailors	Port Colborne, Ontario	Vale Centre	1963
St. Catharines Falcons	St. Catharines, Ontario	Seymour-Hannah Sports and Entertainment Centre	1968
Stoney Creek Generals	Stoney Creek, Ontario	Gateway Ice Centre	2026
Waterloo Siskins	Waterloo, Ontario	Waterloo Memorial Recreation Complex	1971
Welland Jr. Canadians	Welland, Ontario	Welland Arena	1975

=== Former teams ===
Future GOJHL/GOHL Teams
Team	City	Arena	Founded	Folded/Moved
Ancaster Avalanche	Ancaster	Morgan Firestone Arena	2014	2019, moved to Hamilton as the Hamilton Kilty B's
Brantford 99ers	Brantford	Brantford Civic Centre	2013	2019, renamed Brantford Bandits
Brantford Bandits	Brantford	Wayne Gretzky Sports Centre	2019	2024, franchise sold to Titan Hockey Group, rebranded as the Brantford Titans
Brampton Bombers	Brampton	Brampton Memorial Arena	2012	2020, moved to Caledon as the Caledon Bombers
Buffalo Blades	Cheektowaga	Buffalo State College Ice Complex	2012	2013, renamed as the Buffalo Regals
Buffalo Regals	Buffalo	Holiday Twin Rinks	2014	2013, moved to Lockport, NY as the Lockport Regals
Caledon Bombers	Caledon		2020	2026, franchise converted to Stoney Creek
Cambridge Winter Hawks	Cambridge	Galt Arena Gardens	1982	2017, withdrew from the OHA
Guelph Hurricanes	Guelph	Sleeman Centre (Guelph)	2009	2018, moved to Cambridge as the Cambridge Redhawks
Kitchener Dutchmen	Kitchener	Kitchener Memorial Auditorium Complex	1988	2020, franchise bought by Ayr Jr C, moved to Ayr as the Ayr Centennials
Lambton Shores Predators	Forest	The Shores Recreation Centre	2008	2017, moved to Komoka as the Komoka Kings
Leamington Flyers	Leamington	Nature Fresh Farms Recreation Centre	1954	2023, moved to OJHL
Lockport Regals	Lockport	Buffalo State College Ice Complex	2019	2020, moved to Cheektowaga, NY as the Buffalo Regals, resign from the GOJHL for 2020 season
Niagara Falls Canucks	Niagara Falls	Gale Centre	1971	2023, moved to OJHL
Petrolia Jets	Petrolia	Petrolia Arena	1960	2008, moved to Forest as the Lambton Shores Predators
Port Colborne Pirates	Port Colborne	Gale Centre	2008	2014, moved to Pelham as the Pelham Pirates
Sarnia Blast	Sarnia	Pat Stapleton Arena	2001	2009, renamed as the Sarnia Legionnaires
Stoney Creek Warriors	Stoney Creek	Morgan Firestone Arena	1974	2014, moved to Ancaster as the Ancaster Avalanche
Tecumseh Chiefs	Tecumseh	Tecumseh Arena	1995	2008, moved to LaSalle as the LaSalle Vipers
Thorold Blackhawks	Thorold	Thorold Community Arena	1963	2022, temporarily to Port Colborne for 2022/23 season, permanently relocate for the 2023/24 season as the Port Colborne Sailors
Wheatfield Jr. Blades	Wheatfield	Hockey Outlet	1987	2012, moved to Cheektowaga as the Buffalo Blades

=== Future teams ===
Future GOHL Teams
Team	City	Arena	Capcity	Founded	Joining
Woodstock Navy-Vets	Woodstock, Ontario	Woodstock District Community Complex	2,000	1966	2026
Stoney Creek Generals	Stoney Creek, Ontario	Gateway Ice Centre	3,000	2026	2026

== Timeline of teams ==
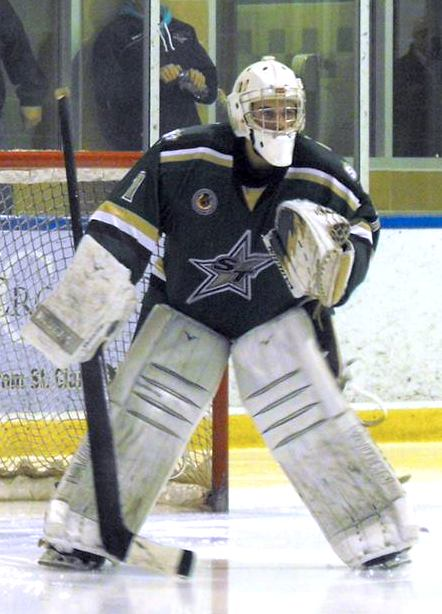
Stars goalie during 2013–14 season.

- 2007 – Mid-Western Junior Hockey League, Western Ontario Hockey League, and Golden Horseshoe Junior Hockey League merge to form GOJHL
- 2008 – Tecumseh Chiefs move and become LaSalle Vipers
- 2008 – Petrolia Jets move and become Lambton Shores Predators
- 2008 – Sarnia Blast become Sarnia Legionnaires
- 2008 – Brantford Golden Eagles become Brantford Eagles
- 2008 – Port Colborne Sailors become Port Colborne Pirates
- 2009 – Guelph Dominators become Guelph Hurricanes
- 2009 – Owen Sound Greys take one-year leave
- 2010 – Owen Sound Greys return to league
- 2011 – Wheatfield Jr. Blades move and become Buffalo Blades
- 2012 – Owen Sound Greys relocate and become Brampton Bombers
- 2012 – Brantford Eagles relocate and become Caledonia Corvairs
- 2013 – Buffalo Blades are renamed Buffalo Regals
- 2013 – Brantford 99'ers are granted expansion
- 2013 – Stoney Creek Warriors relocated and become Ancaster Avalanche
- 2013 – Caledonia Corvairs switch from Mid-Western to Golden Horseshoe Conference
- 2013 – Round Robin eliminated after Conference finals, a Wild Card entry added to league semi-final
- 2014 – Port Colborne Pirates relocate and become Pelham Pirates
- 2014 – Buffalo Regals take one-year leave
- 2014 – Pelham Pirates change name to Pelham Panthers mid-season.
- 2015 – Buffalo Regals take another one-year leave after failing to properly file paperwork for reinstatement
- 2016 – Buffalo Regals return after two-year hiatus
- 2017 – Cambridge Winterhawks withdraw from OHA and therefore GOJHL. Failure to have Tier 1 designated appears to be main reason.
- 2017 – Lambton Shores Predators relocate and become Komoka Kings
- 2018 – Ancaster Avalanche relocate to Hamilton and become Hamilton Kilty B's
- 2018 – Guelph Hurricanes relocate to Cambridge and become Cambridge Redhawks
- 2018 – Caledonia Corvairs take one-year leave
- 2018 – Buffalo Regals relocate to Lockport and become Lockport Regals
- 2019 – Caledonia Corvairs back from leave of absence, Brantford 99ers change name to Brantford Bandits
- 2020 – Ayr Centennials purchase Kitchener Dutchmen franchise, relocate to Ayr, Waterloo Siskins change name to Kitchener-Waterloo Siskins, Brampton Bombers move to Caledon, ON and rename the Caledon Bombers. Buffalo Regals, Welland Jr. Canadians take one-year leave due to COVID-19
- 2021 - Buffalo Regals resign from the GOJHL
- 2023 – Leamington Flyers and Niagara Falls Canucks move to the OJHL, Thorold Blackhawks relocate and become Port Colborne Sailors
- 2024 – Brantford Bandits are sold to Titan Hockey Group, and are rebranded as the Brantford Titans
- 2025 - The Kitchener-Waterloo Siskins rebrand back to the Waterloo Siskins
- 2026 - The Woodstock Navy-Vets join the GOHL, moving up from the PJHL. Stoney Creek announced as new franchise market, with the Stoney Creek Generals, Hamilton Kilty B's rebrand to the Hamilton Steel

== Sutherland Cup ==
As part of the first structural change to the Sutherland Cup playoffs since 1993–94 season, the GOJHL and OHA have thrown out the three-team round robin that had been used for twenty seasons and opted for a more traditional playdown method. The Sutherland Cup semi-final will now have four teams squaring off in a pair of best-of-seven series to determine the finals. The champions of the three Conferences will be joined by the conference runner-up who has the best playoff record to date. This Wild Card team will play the top ranked Champion who they have not already met in the playoffs.

After the league returned from the COVID-19 pandemic, they reverted to the old three-team round robin format for the Sutherland Cup. The Sutherland Cup Finals was a best-of-three series in 2022, but the league went back to a best-of-seven series for 2023 and 2024. When the league re-aligned to two conferences prior to the 2024–25 season, it eliminated the use for a round robin, as the Sutherland Cup Finals would be played between the Eastern and Western Conference champions.

== Regular season champions ==
This is a list of divisional regular season champions and their point totals, bolded are the overall league regular season champions.

**Greater Ontario Junior Hockey League**
Year	Golden Horseshoe	Pts	Midwestern	Pts	Western	Pts
2007–08	Thorold Blackhawks	67	**Elmira Sugar Kings**	**71**	Tecumseh Chiefs	70
2008–09	St. Catharines Falcons	79	**Brantford Eagles**	**86**	Sarnia Legionnaires	78
2009–10	St. Catharines Falcons	81	**Brantford Eagles**	**88**	London Nationals	77
2010–11	**Niagara Falls Canucks**	**80**	Guelph Hurricanes	73	Strathroy Rockets	78
2011–12	St. Catharines Falcons	82	**Brantford Eagles**	**85**	Sarnia Legionnaires	69
2012–13	**St. Catharines Falcons**	**82**	Caledonia Corvairs	73	Chatham Maroons	74
2013–14	**Caledonia Corvairs**	**91**	Kitchener Dutchmen	77	Leamington Flyers	76
2014–15	**Caledonia Corvairs**	**90**	Elmira Sugar Kings	80	Leamington Flyers	78
2015–16	Caledonia Corvairs	89	**Kitchener Dutchmen**	**90**	Leamington Flyers	83
2016–17	**Caledonia Corvairs**	**89**	Listowel Cyclones	83	LaSalle Vipers	78
2017–18	**Caledonia Corvairs**	**91**	Listowel Cyclones	83	London Nationals	73
2018–19	**Niagara Falls Canucks**	**83**	Listowel Cyclones	70	Leamington Flyers	71
2019–20	**Caledonia Corvairs**	**91**	Elmira Sugar Kings	77	London Nationals	87
2020–21	Cancelled due to the COVID-19 pandemic
2021–22	**Hamilton Kilty B's**	**81**	Elmira Sugar Kings	72	Leamington Flyers	72
2022–23	**St. Catharines Falcons**	**82**	Kitchener-Waterloo Siskins	78	Leamington Flyers	74
2023–24	**Caledonia Corvairs**	**80**	Listowel Cyclones	79	London Nationals	75
Year	Eastern Conference	Pts	Western Conference	Pts
2024–25	St. Catharines Falcons	72	**St. Marys Lincolns**	**86**
2025-26	**Cambridge Redhawks**	**90**	Chatham Maroons	79

== Sutherland Cup champions ==
For OHA Junior "B" champions prior to the 2007–08 season, please visit: Sutherland Cup.

Bold denotes Sutherland Cup Champion. Italicized denotes Sutherland Cup finalist.

**Greater Ontario Junior Hockey League**
Year	Golden Horseshoe	Midwestern	Western
2008	Thorold Blackhawks	Elmira Sugar Kings	**Tecumseh Chiefs**
2009	Stoney Creek Warriors	**Brantford Eagles**	Sarnia Legionnaires
2010	Stoney Creek Warriors	Brantford Eagles	**LaSalle Vipers**
2011	Niagara Falls Canucks	**Elmira Sugar Kings**	St. Thomas Stars
2012	**St. Catharines Falcons**	Brantford Eagles	London Nationals
2013	St. Catharines Falcons	Cambridge Winter Hawks	**London Nationals**

Year	Golden Horseshoe	Midwestern	Western	Wild Card
2014	**Caledonia Corvairs**	Waterloo Siskins	Leamington Flyers	St. Catharines Falcons
2015	**Caledonia Corvairs**	Elmira Sugar Kings	Leamington Flyers	LaSalle Vipers
2016	**Caledonia Corvairs**	Stratford Cullitons	London Nationals	Waterloo Siskins
2017	Caledonia Corvairs	Listowel Cyclones	London Nationals	**Elmira Sugar Kings**
2018	Caledonia Corvairs	**Listowel Cyclones**	London Nationals	Elmira Sugar Kings
2019	Niagara Falls Canucks	**Waterloo Siskins**	London Nationals	Listowel Cyclones
2020	Cancelled due to the COVID-19 pandemic
2021	Cancelled due to the COVID-19 pandemic

Year	Golden Horseshoe	Midwestern	Western
2022	**St. Catharines Falcons**	Cambridge Redhawks	Chatham Maroons
2023	Hamilton Kilty B's	Stratford Warriors	**Leamington Flyers**
2024	Fort Erie Meteors	**Listowel Cyclones**	St. Marys Lincolns

Year	Western	Eastern
2025	**Chatham Maroons**	St. Catharines Falcons
2026	St. Marys Lincolns	**Cambridge Redhawks**

=== League championship series ===
Bolded is winner of Sutherland Cup as GOJHL and OHA champion.

**Season**	**Champion**	**Finalist**	**Series** (Best of 7)	**Scores**
2008	**Tecumseh Chiefs**	Elmira Sugar Kings	4–0	**5–4** OT, **3–1**, **2–1** OT, **5–3**
2009	**Brantford Eagles**	Stoney Creek Warriors	4–1	**4–1**, **3–2**, 4–5 OT, **6–1**, **3–2**
2010	**LaSalle Vipers**	Brantford Eagles	4–1	**6–4**, **5–2**, **5–3**, 3–6, **3–2** 2OT
2011	**Elmira Sugar Kings**	Niagara Falls Canucks	4–1	**4–2**, 5–6 OT, **3–1**, **4–3**, **4–0**
2012	**St. Catharines Falcons**	Brantford Eagles	4–2	2–5, 1–4, **3–1**, **3–2** OT, **2–1**, **5–1**
2013	**London Nationals**	Cambridge Winter Hawks	4–3	4–6, 2–3 OT, **6–0**, **4–3**, 1–4, **2–1** OT, **4–2**
2014	**Caledonia Corvairs**	St. Catharines Falcons	4–3	2–7, **4–1**, **3–0**, 2–3 2OT, **3–1**, 2–3 3OT, **3–1**
2015	**Caledonia Corvairs**	LaSalle Vipers	4–2	2–4, **6–4**, **3–2**, **4–3**, 4–5 OT, **4–3**
2016	**Caledonia Corvairs**	London Nationals	4–0	**9–3**, **6–0**, **8–1**, **4–3** OT
2017	**Elmira Sugar Kings**	London Nationals	4–1	**3–0**, **2–0**, **4–1**, 4–6, **4–1**
2018	**Listowel Cyclones**	Caledonia Corvairs	4–0	**4–3**, **6–3**, **2–0**, **4–1**
2019	**Waterloo Siskins**	London Nationals	4–3	**9–4**, **5–4** OT, 2–6, 1–3, **5–3**, 1–5, **3–2** OT
2020	Cancelled due to the COVID-19 pandemic
2021	Cancelled due to the COVID-19 pandemic
2022	**St. Catharines Falcons**	Chatham Maroons	2–0	**6–2**, **8–2**
2023	**Leamington Flyers**	Stratford Warriors	4–3	**4–1**, **4–1**, 2–6, **4–2**, 1–4, 3–4, **4–0**
2024	**Listowel Cyclones**	St. Marys Lincolns	4–1	2–3, **4–1**, **2–1** OT, **4–3**, **4–3** OT
2025	**Chatham Maroons**	St. Catharines Falcons	4–2	**7-3**, 2-5, **7–3**, 5-8, **5-2**, **6-3**
2026	**Cambridge Redhawks**	St. Marys Lincolns	4–1	**2–0**, **4–2**, 3–5, **1–0**, **4–3** OT

== NHL entry draft ==
First round NHL entry draft picks of players straight out of the GOJHL:

- Daultan Leveille: 2008 first round, 29th overall to Atlanta Thrashers (St. Catharines Falcons)
- Tyler Wall: 2016 sixth round, 174th overall to New York Rangers (Leamington Flyers)
- Ryan MacPherson: 2023 sixth round, 172nd overall to Philadelphia Flyers (Leamington Flyers)
