= Ancaster Avalanche =

- City: Ancaster, Ontario, Canada
- League: Greater Ontario Junior Hockey League
- Division: Golden Horseshoe
- Founded: 2013
- Folded: 2018
- Home arena: Morgan Firestone Arena
- Colours: Burgundy, blue, white
- General manager: Steve Hodson
- Head coach: Ken Peroff

Franchise history
- 1993-2001: Stoney Creek Spirit
- 2001-2013: Stoney Creek Warriors
- 2013-2018: Ancaster Avalanche
- 2018-2026: Hamilton Kilty B's
- 2026-: Hamilton Steel

The Ancaster Avalanche were a Canadian junior ice hockey team based in Ancaster, Ontario. They played in the Golden Horseshoe Conference of the Greater Ontario Junior Hockey League. The team was known as the Stoney Creek Warriors prior to 2013. In 2018, they relocated to become the Hamilton Kilty B's.

== History ==
In the Summer of 2013, the team was relocated to Ancaster, Ontario and renamed the Avalanche. On September 7, 2013, hockey officially returned to Ancaster, as the Avalanche hosted the Buffalo Regals in their season opener and defeated them 10-3. In 2015 the Avalanche became an affiliate of the OHL Hamilton Bulldogs.

In April 2018, the team announced that they will be moving to Dave Andreychuk Mountain Arena and will be rebranded as the Hamilton Kilty B's.

== Season-by-season results ==
| Season | GP | W | L | T | OTL | GF | GA | P | Results | Playoffs |
| 2013-14 | 49 | 24 | 19 | - | 6 | 187 | 165 | 54 | 5th GOJHL-GH | Lost Conf. QF |
| 2014-15 | 49 | 29 | 16 | - | 4 | 170 | 144 | 62 | 4th GOJHL-GH | Won Conf. Quarter-finals, 4-0 (Canucks); Lost Conf. Semi-final, 1-4 (Corvairs) |
| 2015-16 | 50 | 28 | 15 | 4 | 3 | 205 | 154 | 63 | 3rd of 8-GH; 10th of 26 GOJHL | Won Conf. Quarter-finals, 4-0 (Blackhawks); Lost Conf. Semi-final, 2-4 (Falcons) |
| 2016-17 | 50 | 30 | 15 | 0 | 5 | 217 | 143 | 65 | 4th of 9-GH; 10th of 27 GOJHL | Won Conf. Quarter-finals, 4-0 (Meteors); Lost Conf. Semifinal, 0-4 (Corvairs) |
| 2017-18 | 50 | 38 | 10 | 1 | 1 | 200 | 123 | 78 | 3rd of 9-GH; 4th of 26 GOJHL | won Conf. Quarter-finals, 4-0 (Jr. Canadians); Lost Conf. Semifinal 3-4 (Falcons) |

== Notable alumni ==
- Nick Caamano
