= Hamilton Steel =

Canadian junior ice hockey team

- City: Hamilton, Ontario, Canada
- League: Greater Ontario Hockey League
- Conference: Golden Horseshoe Conference
- Founded: 1974
- Home arena: Dave Andreychuk Mountain Arena
- Colours: Grey, and black
- General manager: Jordan Tanner
- Head coach: Shawn Dietrich
- Affiliates: Brantford Bulldogs (OHL)
- Website: https://www.hamiltonjrsteel.com/

Franchise history
- 1993–2001: Stoney Creek Spirit
- 2001–2013: Stoney Creek Warriors
- 2013–2018: Ancaster Avalanche
- 2018–2026: Hamilton Kilty B's
- 2026–present: Hamilton Steel

The Hamilton Steel are a Canadian junior ice hockey team based in Hamilton, Ontario. They play in the Eastern Conference of the Greater Ontario Hockey League. The team was known as the Stoney Creek Warriors prior to 2013 and the Ancaster Avalanche until 2018.

== History ==
The Stoney Creek Warriors were formed in 1974 as a member of the Niagara & District Junior C Hockey League. As a Junior C team, the Warriors won four league titles. The Warriors moved up to the Golden Horseshoe Junior B Hockey League in 1994 under the name Spirit.

In the summer of 2013, the team was relocated to Ancaster, Ontario and renamed the Avalanche. On September 7, 2013, hockey officially returned to Ancaster, as the Avalanche hosted the Buffalo Regals in their season opener and defeated them 10–3. In 2016 the Avalanche became an affiliate of the OHL Hamilton Bulldogs.

In April 2018, the team announced they were moving to Hamilton, taking over the Kilty B's moniker, purchased from the ownership of the Markham Royals who were previously located in Hamilton as the Red Wings and Kilty B's.

On March 13, 2026, the team rebranded as the Hamilton Steel.

== Season-by-season results ==
Season	GP	W	L	T	OTL	GF	GA	P	Results	Playoffs
Stoney Creek Warriors (final 5 seasons)
2008–09	52	35	15	-	2	246	173	72	2nd GOJHL-GH	Lost final
2009–10	51	36	11	-	4	248	166	76	2nd GOJHL-GH	Lost semi-final round robin
2010–11	51	26	20	-	5	209	192	57	6th GOJHL-GH	Lost Conf. QF
2011–12	51	15	33	-	3	152	238	33	6th GOJHL-GH	Lost Conf. QF
2012–13	51	18	26	-	7	145	179	43	6th GOJHL-GH	Lost Conf. QF
Ancaster Avalanche
2013–14	49	24	19	-	6	187	165	54	5th GOJHL-GH	Lost Conf. QF
2014–15	49	29	16	-	4	170	144	62	4th GOJHL-GH	Won Conf. Quarter-finals, 4–0 (Canucks); Lost Conf. Semi-final, 1–4 (Corvairs)
2015–16	50	28	15	4	3	205	154	63	3rd of 8-GH; 10th of 26 GOJHL	Won Conf. Quarter-finals, 4–0 (Blackhawks); Lost Conf. Semi-final, 2–4 (Falcons)
2016–17	50	30	15	0	5	217	143	65	4th of 9-GH; 10th of 27 GOJHL	Won Conf. Quarter-finals, 4–0 (Meteors); Lost Conf. Semi-final, 0–4 (Corvairs)
2017–18	50	38	10	1	1	200	123	78	3rd of 9-GH; 4th of 26 GOJHL	won Conf. Quarter-finals, 4–0 (Jr. Canadians); Lost Conf. Semi-final 3–4 (Falcons)
Hamilton Kilty B's
2018–19	48	35	12	0	1	194	110	71	3rd of 8-GH; 3rd of 25 GOJHL	won Conf. Quarter-finals, 4–0 (Jr. Canadians); Lost Conf. Semi-final 3–4 (Falcons)
2019–20	50	31	16	0	3	193	129	65	3rd of 8-GH; 9th of 26 GOJHL	won Conf. Quarter-finals, 4–0 (Blackhawks); Incomplete Conf. Semi-final 0-2 (Corvairs) playoffs cancelled due to COVID-19
2020–21	Season lost due to COVID-19									
2021–22	48	40	7	1	0	203	86	81	1st of 8-GH; 1st of 25 GOJHL	won Conf. Quarter-finals, 4–0 (Canucks); Won Conf. Semi-final 4-3 (Meteors); Lost COnf. Finals 2-4 (Falcons)
2022–23	50	38	7	5	0	204	130	81	2nd of 8-GH; 2nd of 25 GOJHL	won Conf. Quarter-finals, 4–1 (Jr. Canadians); Won Conf. Semi-final 4-1 (Meteors); Won COnf. Finals 4-0 (Corvairs); Round Robin 1-3 (Warriors)(Flyers) eliminated
2023–24	50	24	22	4	0	163	162	52	2nd of 7-GH; 14th of 23 GOJHL	Won Conf. Quarter-finals, 4-3 (Jr. Canadians); Lost Conf Semifinal, 1-4 (Corvairs)
2024–25	50	20	24	5	1	165	192	46	8 of 11-Eaast Conf; 17th of 23 GOJHL	Lost Conf. Quarter-finals, 1-4 (Falcons)
2025–26	50	16	28	6	0	125	178	38	9 of 11-Eaast Conf; 19th of 23 GOJHL	Did Not Qualified
Hamilton Steel

== Sutherland Cup appearances ==
2009: Brantford Eagles defeated Stoney Creek Warriors 4-games-to-1
