= Fort Erie Meteors =

Canadian junior ice hockey team

- City: Fort Erie, Ontario, Canada
- League: Greater Ontario Junior Hockey League
- Division: Golden Horseshoe
- Founded: 1957
- Home arena: Leisureplex Kinsmen Arena
- Colours: Orange, Black, and White
- Owner: Meaghan Passero
- General manager: Nik Passero
- Head coach: Nik Passero

Franchise history
- 1957-1964: Fort Erie Frontiers
- 1964-1971: Fort Erie Autos
- 1971-present: Fort Erie Meteors

The Fort Erie Meteors are a Canadian junior ice hockey team based in Fort Erie, Ontario, Canada. They play in the Eastern conference of the Greater Ontario Hockey League.

== History ==
The Meteors originated in the Niagara District Junior B Hockey League in 1957. The Meteors stuck with the Niagara league until the bitter end, winning the league's final championship in 1979. The next year they entered the Golden Horseshoe Junior Hockey League.

As of 2007, the Meteors are in the Golden Horseshoe Division of the Greater Ontario Junior Hockey League.

On December 31, 2012, owner and general manager Tony Passero pulled the Meteors from the ice and after two minutes the game was forfeited to their opponent, Port Colborne Pirates. Passero had been ejected from the game for his reaction to his son, one of his team's players, being hit from behind by an opponent and the referees only calling a roughing minor. He was suspended from team functions by the Ontario Hockey Association for two seasons as well as the remaining 27 games of the current season. As well, the team was fined $2750.

== Season-by-season results ==
Season	GP	W	L	T	OTL	GF	GA	P	Results	Playoffs
1957-58	15	12	2	1	-	-	-	25	1st NDJBHL	
1958-59	-	-	-	0	-	-	-	-	2nd NDJBHL	
1959-60	24	15	3	6	-	146	98	36	2nd NDJBHL	
1960-61	25	8	15	2	-	99	125	18	5th NDJBHL	
1961-62	18	0	18	0	-	23	172	0	7th NDJBHL	
1962-63	30	2	28	0	-	-	-	4	6th NDJBHL	
1963-64	19*	2	15	2	-	121	210	6	7th NDJBHL	incomplete record
1964-65	30	2	27	1	-	77	220	5	7th NDJBHL	
1965-66	28	2	26	0	-	192	264	4	7th NDJBHL	
1965-66	28	2	26	0	-	192	264	4	7th NDJBHL	
1966-67	-	-	-	-	-	-	-	-	5th NDJBHL	
1967-68	30	10	15	5	-	133	170	25	5th NDJBHL	
1968-69	36	7	27	2	-	134	219	16	7th NDJBHL	
1969-70	36	8	25	3	-	143	207	19	7th NDJBHL	
1970-71	36	4	29	2	-	128	268	10	7th NDJBHL	
1971-72	34	11	21	2	-	152	194	24	7th NDJBHL	
1972-73	34	17	10	7	-	203	170	41	3rd NDJBHL	
1973-74	35	11	22	2	-	158	241	24	6th NDJBHL	
1974-75	37	18	14	3	-	250	191	39	3rd NDJBHL	
1975-76	40	14	18	8	-	196	209	36	4th NDJBHL	
1976-77	40	13	24	2	-	221	249	28	5th NDJBHL	
1977-78	40	20	18	2	-	192	264	44	3rd NDJBHL	Lost Semi-final
1978-79	39	27	8	4	-	315	--	58	2nd NDJBHL	Won League
1979-80	44	13	27	4	-	232	322	30	8th GHJHL	
1980-81	42	7	34	1	-	192	349	15	8th GHJHL	
1981-82	36	15	17	4	-	-	-	34	5th GHJHL	
1982-83	42	24	14	4	-	300	247	52	2nd GHJHL	
1983-84	42	13	27	2	-	194	262	28	7th GHJHL	
1984-85	42	20	16	6	-	218	224	46	3rd GHJHL	
1985-86	39	7	29	3	-	177	308	17	11th GHJHL	
1986-87	42	3	39	0	-	153	372	6	8th GHJHL	
1987-88	42	6	33	3	-	169	360	15	8th GHJHL	
1988-89	42	11	25	6	-	207	238	28	6th GHJHL	
1989-90	48	19	27	1	1	244	313	40	6th GHJHL	
1990-91	42	26	13	3	0	248	217	55	2nd GHJHL	Lost final
1991-92	42	26	15	1	0	282	235	53	3rd GHJHL	
1992-93	42	8	30	3	1	158	312	20	6th GHJHL	
1993-94	40	1	38	1	0	119	421	3	6th GHJHL	
1994-95	42	12	29	1	2	170	261	27	6th GHJHL	
1995-96	50	19	26	3	2	185	264	43	5th GHJHL	
1996-97	42	23	16	3	0	228	206	49	4th GHJHL	
1997-98	49	15	27	5	2	200	273	37	6th GHJHL	
1998-99	48	14	26	5	3	155	229	36	6th GHJHL	
1999-00	48	11	31	4	2	156	207	28	6th GHJHL	
2000-01	48	13	28	3	4	152	213	33	5th GHJHL	
2001-02	48	16	23	7	2	154	206	41	5th GHJHL	
2002-03	48	11	33	4	0	155	286	26	6th GHJHL	
2003-04	48	15	24	3	6	166	211	39	4th GHJHL	
2004-05	48	10	35	2	1	129	220	23	7th GHJHL	
2005-06	49	10	30	5	4	156	245	29	7th GHJHL	Lost quarter-final
2006-07	49	14	31	2	2	211	291	32	6th GHJHL	Lost quarter-final
2007-08	49	27	17	3	2	207	201	59	4th GOJHL-GH	
2008-09	52	21	29	-	2	207	272	44	5th GOJHL-GH	
2009-10	51	14	35	-	2	150	266	30	8th GOJHL-GH	Lost Conf. QF
2010-11	51	7	42	-	2	111	326	16	7th GOJHL-GH	Lost Conf. QF
2011-12	51	12	36	-	3	154	247	27	7th GOJHL-GH	Lost Conf. QF
2012-13	51	17	31	-	3	153	237	37	7th GOJHL-GH	
2013-14	49	13	30	-	6	163	228	32	7th GOJHL-GH	Lost Conf. QF
2014-15	49	15	26	-	8	114	171	38	7th GOJHL-GH	Lost Conf. Quarter-finals, 1-4 (Jr. Canadians)
2015-16	50	25	21	1	3	188	198	54	5th of 8 GH; 15th of 26 GOJHL	Lost Conf. Quarter-finals, 1-4 (Canucks)
2016-17	50	24	26	0	0	167	180	49	5th of 9 GH; 16th of 27 GOJHL	Lost Conf. Quarter-finals, 1-4 (Avalanche)
2017-18	50	10	32	1	7	130	228	28	8th of 9 GH; 24th of 26 GOJHL	Lost Conf. Quarter-finals, 0-4 (Corvairs)
2018-19	48	14	30	0	4	124	207	32	6th of 8 GH; 20th of 25 GOJHL	Lost Conf. Quarter-finals, 0-4 (Kilty B's)
2019-20	50	15	30	0	5	139	212	35	7th of 9 GH; 21st of 26 GOJHL	Lost Conf. Quarter-finals, 1-4 (Canucks)
2020–21	Season lost due to Covid-19									
2021–22	48	26	21	0	1	163	137	53	4th of 8 GH; 12th of 25 GOJHL	Won Conf. QF, 4-0 (Jr. Canadians); Lost Conf. SF, 3-4 (Kilty B's)
2022–23	50	32	13	5	0	163	137	53	3rd of 8 GH; 9th of 25 GOJHL	Won Conf. QF, 4-2 (Canucks); Lost Conf. SF, 1-4 (Kilty B's)
2023–24	50	36	12	2	0	191	118	74	2nd of 7 GH; 4th of 23 GOJHL	Won Conf. QF, 4-0 (Sailors); Won Conf Semifinal, 4-2 (Falcons); Won Conf. Finals 4-3 (Corvairs); 1-3 Dbl Rd Robin (Cyclones) & (Lincolns) eliminated
2024–25	50	33	11	6	0	187	112	72	3rd of 11 East Conf; 5th of 23 GOJHL	Won Conf. QF, 4-2 (Redhawks); Won Conf Semifinal, 4-0 (Corvairs); Lost Conf. Finals 2-4 (Falcons)
2025–26	50	39	9	2	0	218	109	80	3rd of 11 East Conf; 3rd of 23 GOJHL	Won Conf. QF, 4-0 (Brantford Titans); Lost Conf Semifinal, 3-4, (Falcons)

== Notable alumni ==
National Hockey League players:

- Randy Burridge
- Stan Drulia
- Bill Huard
- Mike Lalor
- Jarrod Skalde

Other professional league players:

- Rick Morocco
