= Buffalo Regals =

- City: Cheektowaga, New York, United States
- League: Greater Ontario Junior Hockey League
- Division: Golden Horseshoe
- Founded: 1987
- Folded: 2021
- Home arena: Holiday Twin Rinks
- Colors: Navy, red, white
- General manager: John Evoy (2018–19)
- Head coach: Tyler Casillo (2019–20)
- Affiliates: Buffalo Jr. Sabres (OJHL)

Franchise history
- 1987–2011: Wheatfield Jr. Blades
- 2011–2013: Buffalo Blades
- 2013–2018: Buffalo Regals
- 2018–2019: Lockport Regals
- 2019–2021: Buffalo Regals

The Buffalo Regals were an American junior "B" ice hockey team based in the Buffalo suburb of Cheektowaga, New York. They played in the Greater Ontario Junior Hockey League (GOJHL). The organization also had several youth hockey teams.

== History ==
Founded in 1987, the Wheatfield Jr. Blades played out of the Northeastern Junior Hockey League from 1987 until 1997. In 1997, the Blades jumped to the Tier III Junior B Empire Junior Hockey League (EmJHL). In the 2005–06 season, the Blades elected to field two teams, one to play in the EmJHL and another to play in the Canadian Junior B Golden Horseshoe Junior Hockey League (GHJHL). Each team's primary players were different, but listed the other team's players as affiliates. In the 2006–07 Season, the Blades sold their EmJHL team to the Buffalo Stars.

Before the 2011–12 season, the team was renamed the Buffalo Blades and managed by Jerry Shorthouse and John Bruno. As the Buffalo Blades, the team would only win nine times in 101 games. In 2013, the team was bought by a group with close ties to the local minor hockey association and the team was renamed the Regals.

It was announced on September 2, 2014 that the Regals would not play the 2014–15 season after the OJHL's Buffalo Jr. Sabres ended an agreement to transfer players between the two teams, causing the Regals to lose a valuable source of talent and unable to field a team. Prior to the 2015–16 season, the Regals failed to file the appropriate reinstatement paper work with USA Hockey in order to play the season.

The Regals returned to the GOJHL in time for the 2016–17 season. However, on 21 November, after 24 games, all of which were lost in regulation, the GOJHL announced over social media that the Regals had been removed from the league after the team did not travel to play the Welland Jr. Canadians. One day later, the statement was deleted and the Regals played a home game against the Ancaster Avalanche, which they lost 7–0. GM Mike Answeeney said: "It's back to normal as far as I’m concerned... We're going to show up for every game scheduled."

The team moved to Cornerstone Arena in nearby Lockport, New York, prior to the 2018–19 season and rebranded as the Lockport Regals. The team returned to using the Buffalo name at the start of the 2019–20 season and moved to the Holiday Twin Rinks in Cheektowaga, New York. The 2019–20 postseason was curtailed by the onset of the COVID-19 pandemic and the following GOJHL season never took place due to the pandemic-related restrictions. The Regals were the only GOJHL team not listed to return for the 2021–22 season, and then they later resigned from the GOJHL.

== Season results ==
Season	GP	W	L	T	OTL	GF	GA	Pts	Regular season finish	Playoffs
1987–88	22	14	16	2	—	—	—	30	4th NEJHL	Lost final
1988–89	44	10	33	1	—	—	—	21	5th NEJHL	
1989–90	47	9	35	3	—	—	—	21	5th NEJHL	
1990–91	59	33	23	3	—	—	—	69	2nd NEJHL	Lost final, Won Nationals
1991–92	53	31	19	3	—	—	—	65	2nd NEJHL	Lost final
1992–93	58	32	23	3	—	—	—	67	1st NEJHL	Won League
1993–94	55	36	17	2	—	—	—	74	1st NEJHL	Won League
1994–95	54	34	16	4	—	—	—	72	1st NEJHL	Won League
1995–96	56	30	23	3	—	—	—	63	1st NEJHL	Won League
1995–96	10	3	7	0	0	28	78	—	GHJHL Interleague	
1996–97	—	—	—	—	—	—	—	—	NEJHL	
1996–97	14	0	14	0	0	43	133	—	GHJHL Interleague	
1997–98	33	29	12	2	—	—	—	60	2nd EmJHL	Lost final
1998–99	54	37	14	3	—	—	—	77	1st EmJHL	Won League
1999–00	28	15	12	1	—	—	—	31	4th EmJHL	Won League
2000–01	30	23	7	0	—	163	83	46	1st EmJHL	Won League
2001–02	34	32	1	1	—	—	—	65	1st EmJHL	Lost final
2002–03	32	21	8	3	—	153	91	45	3rd EmJHL	Lost in Round Robin
2003–04	38	31	6	1	—	—	—	63	1st EmJHL	Won League
2004–05	44	31	10	3	—	—	—	—	1st EmJHL-West	
2005–06	42	2	34	3	3	91	212	10	19th EmJHL	
2005–06	49	8	37	3	1	131	301	20	8th GHJHL	Lost quarter-final
2006–07	49	8	39	0	2	184	294	18	8th GHJHL	Lost quarter-final
2007–08	49	5	42	2	0	128	303	12	8th GOJHL-GH	
2008–09	52	19	28	—	5	152	214	43	7th GOJHL-GH	
2009–10	51	13	32	—	6	173	263	32	7th GOJHL-GH	Lost Conference Quarter-final
2010–11	51	4	45	—	2	105	334	10	8th GOJHL-GH	
2011–12	50	8	40	—	2	130	295	18	8th GOJHL-GH	Lost Conference Quarter-final
2012–13	51	1	49	—	1	110	421	3	8th GOJHL-GH	Lost Conference Quarter-final
2013–14	49	4	44	—	1	112	264	9	9th GOJHL-GH	Did not qualify
2014–15	Leave of absence									
2015–16	Leave of absence									
2016–17	50	3	47	0	0	66	536	6	9th GH Conf; 27 of 27 GOJHL	Did not qualify
2017–18	50	2	43	0	5	98	319	9	9th GH Conf; 26 of 26 GOJHL	Did not qualify
2018–19	48	8	38	1	1	120	298	18	8th GH Conf; 25 of 25 GOJHL	Did not qualify
2019–20	50	10	34	2	4	127	225	26	8th GH Conf; 24 of 26 GOJHL	Did not qualify
