= Komoka Kings =

Canadian junior ice hockey team

- City: Komoka, Ontario
- League: Greater Ontario Hockey League
- Conference: Western Conference
- Founded: 1968
- Home arena: Komoka Wellness Centre
- Colours: Purple, yellow, and white
- Owner: Roop Chanderdat
- General manager: Roop Chanderdat
- Head coach: Johnny Warren
- Captain: None
- Affiliates: Elgin Middlesex Canucks
- Website: https://kings.gojhl.hockeytech.com

Franchise history
- 1960-2008: Petrolia Jets
- 2009–2017: Lambton Shores Predators
- 2017-Present: Komoka Kings

The Komoka Kings are a Canadian junior ice hockey team based in Komoka, Ontario, Canada. They play in the Western division of the Greater Ontario Hockey League.

== History ==
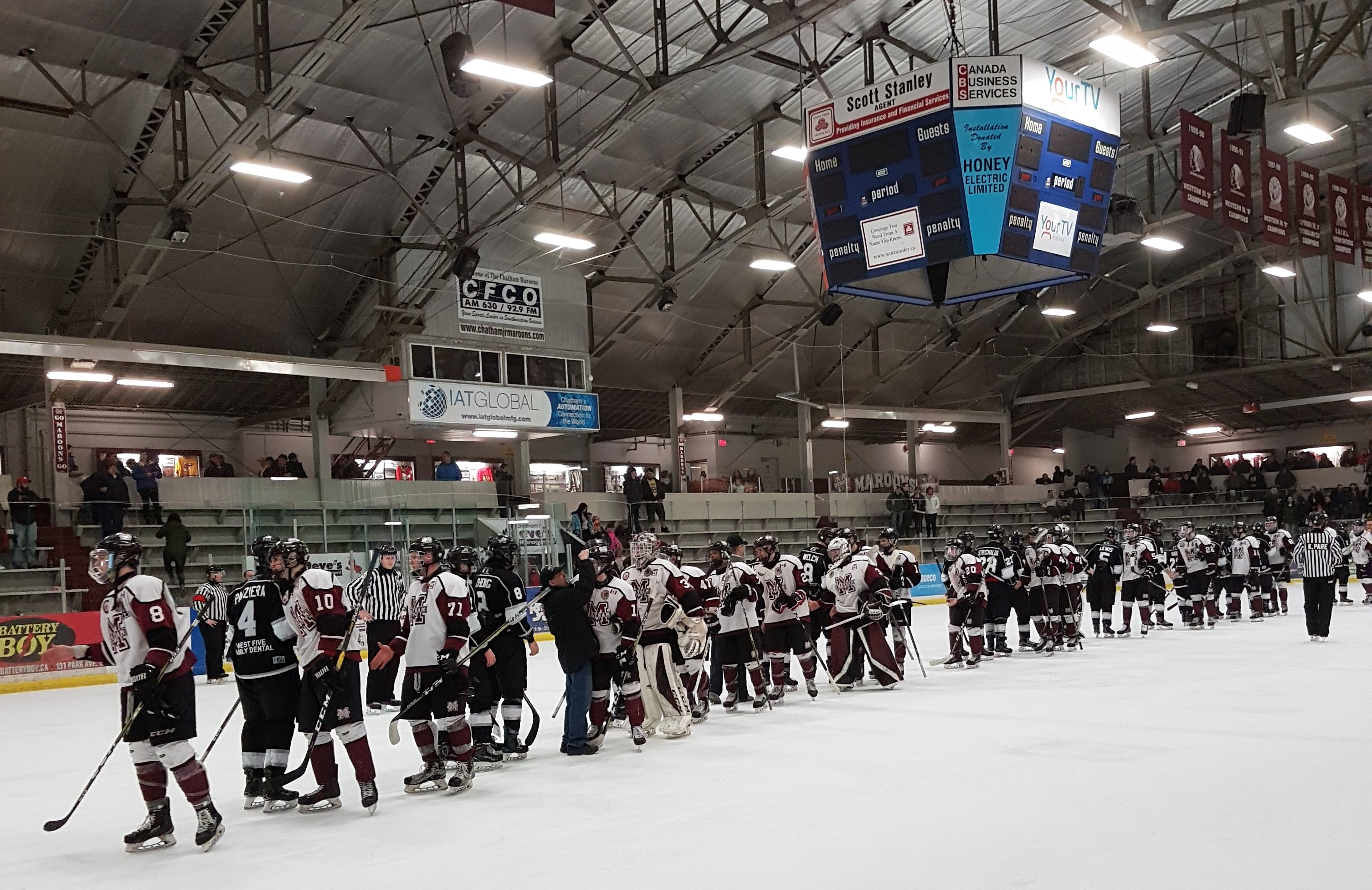
Komoka Kings win 2018-2019 Quarterfinals 4-1 vs. Chatham Maroons

In 1968, the Petrolia Jets joined the Border Cities Junior "B" league. Although not much is known about the league prior to '68, it is thought that the team originated in the "Bluewater Junior "C" Hockey League" by OHA historians. When the BCJCHL became the Great Lakes Junior C Hockey League in 1970, the Jets stayed on board. In 1972, the Jets moved up to Western Junior "B", but were sent back to Junior "C" in 1984. In 1989, the Jets came back to the Western "B".

The Petrolia Jets moved to Forest, Ontario in 2008. Their name was changed to the Lambton Shores Predators, to match the name of the local minor hockey system.

During the summer of 2017, the Predators relocated and became the Komoka Kings and now play out of the Komoka Wellness Centre. The Kings first regular season home game in Komoka was against the Sarnia Legionnaires and ended in a 3-3 2OT tie. Captain Andrew Kim scored 2 goals and Isaac McLean added 1.

In 2024-2025, the Kings rebranded the team's colours and logo to a retro, vintage theme.

== Ownership / Staff ==
- Owner / General Manager - Roop Chanderdat
- Assistant General Manager - Adam Simpson
- Head Coach - Johnny Warren
- Associate Coach - Rich Brown
- Assistant Coach - Bob White
- Goalie Coach - Currently Vacant
- Director, Hockey Administration & Alternate Governor - Ray Giffen
- Hockey Operations Assistant - Brian McAllister
- Trainer - Braiden Procure
- Equipment Manager - Darryl Bond

== Season-by-season results ==
Season	GP	W	L	T	OTL	GF	GA	P	Results	Playoffs
Petrolia Jets (final 5 seasons)
2003-04	48	30	14	1	3	180	148	64	3rd WOJHL	
2004-05	48	12	31	3	2	122	210	29	9th WOJHL	
2005-06	48	26	15	2	5	149	149	59	4th WOJHL	Lost Semi Final
2006-07	48	7	37	-	4	139	302	18	9th WOJHL	DNQ
2007-08	48	7	37	-	4	138	303	18	9th GOJHL-W	DNQ
Lambton Shores Predators
2008-09	52	10	35	-	7	140	268	27	9th GOJHL-W	DNQ
2009-10	50	6	44	-	0	134	338	12	9th GOJHL-W	DNQ
2010-11	51	4	46	-	1	147	415	9	9th GOJHL-W	DNQ
2011-12	51	22	28	-	1	180	212	45	8th GOJHL-W	Lost Conf. QF
2012-13	51	21	24	-	6	172	184	48	8th GOJHL-W	Lost Conf. QF
2013-14	49	6	38	-	5	128	272	17	9th GOJHL-W	DNQ
2014-15	49	14	31	-	4	159	250	32	8th GOJHL-W	Lost Conf Quarter, 0-4 (Flyers)
2015-16	50	8	38	1	3	151	272	20	9th of 9-W; 25th of 26-GOJHL	DNQ
2016-17	50	8	37	0	5	150	290	21	9th of 9-W; 26th of 27-GOJHL	DNQ
Komoka Kings
2017-18	50	12	31	4	3	140	212	31	7th of 9-W; 23rd of 26-GOJHL	Lost Conf Quarterfinal 0-4 (Flyers)
2018-19	48	20	23	3	2	162	172	45	6th of 9-W; 15th of 25-GOJHL	Won Conf Quarterfinal 4-1 (Maroons) Lost Conf Semifinal 3-4 (Flyers)
2019-20	50	17	25	1	7	175	229	42	7th of 9-W; 18th of 25-GOJHL	Lost Conf Quarterfinal 0-4 (Flyers)
2020-21	Season lost due to pandemic									
2021-22	48	22	22	-	4	147	185	48	6th of 9-W; 15th of 25-GOJHL	Lost Conf Quarterfinal 1-4 (Maroons)
2022-23	50	11	36	-	3	145	251	25	9th of 9-W; 22nd of 25-GOJHL	DNQ
2023-24	50	8	42	-	0	98	237	16	8th of 8-W; 22nd of 23-GOJHL	Lost Conf Quarterfinal 1-4 (Nationals)
2024-25	50	5	42	-	3	96	254	13	12th of 12-W; 22nd of 23-GOJHL	DNQ
2025-26	50	16	31	1	2	162	218	35	11th of 12-W; 20nd of 23-GOJHL	DNQ

== Notable alumni ==
- Easton Cowan
