= Caledonia Corvairs =

- City: Caledonia, Ontario, Canada
- League: Greater Ontario Hockey League
- Division: Golden Horseshoe
- Founded: 1970
- Home arena: Haldimand County Caledonia Centre
- Colours: Black and white
- General manager: Jake MacNeil
- Head coach: Jack Mullan

Franchise history
- 1970–1971: Brantford Jets
- 1971–1974: Brantford Gunners
- 1974–1982: Brantford Penguins
- 1982–1986: Brantford Alexander B's
- 1987–1992: Brantford Classics
- 1992–1998: Ohsweken Golden Eagles
- 1998–2002: Brant County Golden Eagles
- 2002–2008: Brantford Golden Eagles
- 2008–2012: Brantford Eagles
- 2012–present: Caledonia Corvairs

The Caledonia Corvairs are a Canadian junior ice hockey team based in Caledonia, Ontario, Canada. They played in the Eastern Conference of the Greater Ontario Hockey League. The team announced it would not participate in the 2018–19 season.

However the team returned to the GOJHL for the 2019–20 season with an entirety new group of players.

On May 23, 2012, the Brantford Eagles were transplanted to Caledonia, Ontario, and renamed the Caledonia Corvairs, the name of the long running Junior C team in the town. The Eagles had been one of the most dominant teams in Junior B for the previous four seasons but lacked crowd support.

== History ==
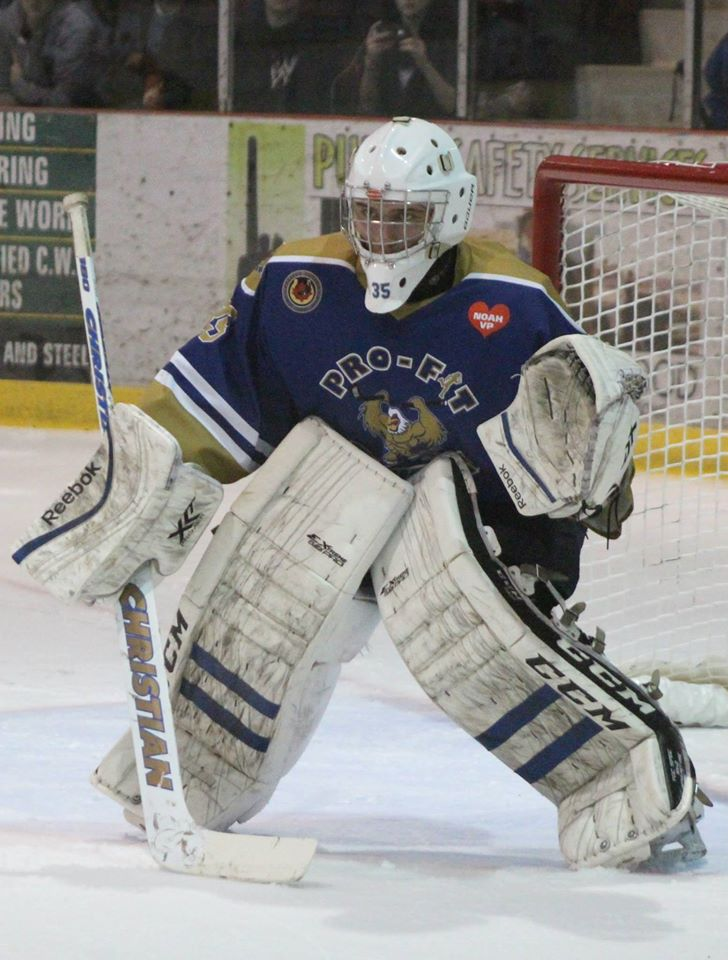
Corvairs goalie during 2015 playoffs.

Prior to the Brantford Eagles, a former Junior C team called the Brantford Penguins joined the Southwestern Junior B Hockey League in 1976. After two seasons, the SWJBHL folded and the Penguins jumped to the Golden Horseshoe Junior Hockey League. In 1984, the Brantford Alexander B's were Golden Horseshoe Champions. In 1986, the Alexander B's were infamously suspended from playing in the 1986–87 season in a crackdown against violence by the Ontario Hockey Association. The team was rebranded the Brantford Classics in 1987 and jumped to the Mid-Western Junior Hockey League. The Classics were very competitive until they relocated to Ohsweken, Ontario, and became the Ohsweken Golden Eagles in 1992. The team would not have another winning season until 2005–06 and missed the playoffs six consecutive years in that time. In 1998, the team was renamed the Brant County Golden Eagles and returned to Brantford in 2002 still as the Golden Eagles. The name was shorted in 2008 to just the Eagles and the team performance turned around. In the newly formed Greater Ontario Junior Hockey League's Mid-Western Conference, the Eagles put up 157 victories in 205 games, three conference titles, and the 2009 Sutherland Cup as OHA and GOJHL Champions.

On May 23, 2012, the team was relocated and renamed the Caledonia Corvairs. After a first-place finish in the 2012–13 in the Mid-Western Conference, the Corvairs applied to transfer to the Golden Horseshoe Conference to play against teams closer to their area.

The Corvairs won the Sutherland Cup from 2014-2016.

== Season-by-season results ==
Season	GP	W	L	T	OTL	GF	GA	Pts	Results	Playoffs
Brantford Eagles (Final 5 Seasons)
2007–08	48	22	22	3	1	189	188	48	5th GOJHL-MW	Lost Conf. QF
2008–09	52	41	7	-	4	281	160	86	1st GOJHL-MW	Won Sutherland Cup, 4-1 (Warriors)
2009–10	51	42	5	-	4	284	141	88	1st GOJHL-MW	Lost Final
2010–11	51	33	14	-	4	228	178	70	3rd GOJHL-MW	Lost Conf. SF
2011–12	51	41	7	-	3	239	139	85	1st GOJHL-MW	Lost Final
Caledonia Corvairs
2012–13	51	34	12	-	5	214	139	73	1st GOJHL-MW	Lost Conf. SF
2013–14	49	45	3	-	1	243	101	91	1st GOJHL-GH	Won Sutherland Cup, 4-3 (Falcons)
2014–15	49	44	3	-	2	242	74	90	1st GOJHL-GH	Won Conf. QF, 4-0 (Panthers); Won Conf. SF, 4-1 (Avalanche); Won Conf. Final, 4-1 (Falcons); Won Sutherland Cup SF, 4-1 (Flyers); Won Sutherland Cup Final, 4-2 (Vipers)
2015–16	50	43	4	1	2	294	98	89	1st of 8 GH; 2nd of 26 GOJHL	Won Conf. QF, 4-0 (Panthers); Won Conf. SF, 4-0 (Canucks); Won Conf. Final, 4-0 (Falcons); Won Sutherland Cup SF, 4-0 (Siskins); Won Sutherland Cup Final, 4-0 (Nationals)
2016–17	50	44	5	1	0	353	99	89	1st of 9 GH; 1st of 27 GOJHL	Bye Conf. QF; Won Conf. SF, 4-0 (Avalanche); Won Conf. Final, 4-2 (Falcons); Lost Sutherland Cup SF 2-4 (Sugar Kings)
2017–18	50	45	4	0	1	309	89	91	1st of 9 GH; 1st of 26 GOJHL	Won Conf. QF, 4-0 (Meteors); Won Conf. SF, 4-1 (Canucks); Won Conf. Final, 4-0 (Falcons); Won Sutherland Cup SF, 4-0 (Sugar Kings); Lost Sutherland Cup Final, 0-4 (Cyclones)
2018–19	Leave of absence									
2019–20	50	45	4	0	1	251	103	91	1st of 9 GH; 1st of 26 GOJHL	Won Conf. QF, 4-0 (Regals); Incomplete Conf. SF, 2-0 (Kilty B's) remaining playoffs cancelled due to COVID-19
2020–21	Season lost due to COVID-19									
2021–22	48	31	13	2	2	164	108	66	3rd of 8 GH; 8th of 25 GOJHL	Won Conf. QF, 4-0 (Blackhawks); Lost Conf. SF, 0-4 (Falcons)
2022–23	50	28	21	0	1	193	175	57	4th of 8 GH; 13th of 25 GOJHL	Won Conf. QF, 4-1 (Blackhawks); Won Conf. SF, 4-3 (Falcons); Lost Conf. Finals 0-4 (Kilty B's)
2024–25	50	29	15	4	2	213	165	64	5th of 11 East Conf; 10th of 23 GOJHL	Won Conf. SF, 4-2 (Sailors); Lost Conf Finals 0-4 (Meteors)
2025–26	50	18	27	5	0	161	180	41	8th of 11 East Conf; 18th of 23 GOJHL	Lost Conf. QF, 0-4 (Redhawks)

== Sutherland Cup appearances ==
2009: Brantford Eagles defeated Stoney Creek Warriors 4-games-to-1
2010: LaSalle Vipers defeated Brantford Eagles 4-games-to-1
2012: St. Catharines Falcons defeated Brantford Eagles 4-games-to-2
2014: Caledonia Corvairs defeated St. Catharines Falcons 4-games-to-3
2015: Caledonia Corvairs defeated LaSalle Vipers 4-games-to-2
2016: Caledonia Corvairs defeated London Nationals 4-games-to-0
2018: Listowel Cyclones defeated Caledonia Corvairs 4-games-to-0

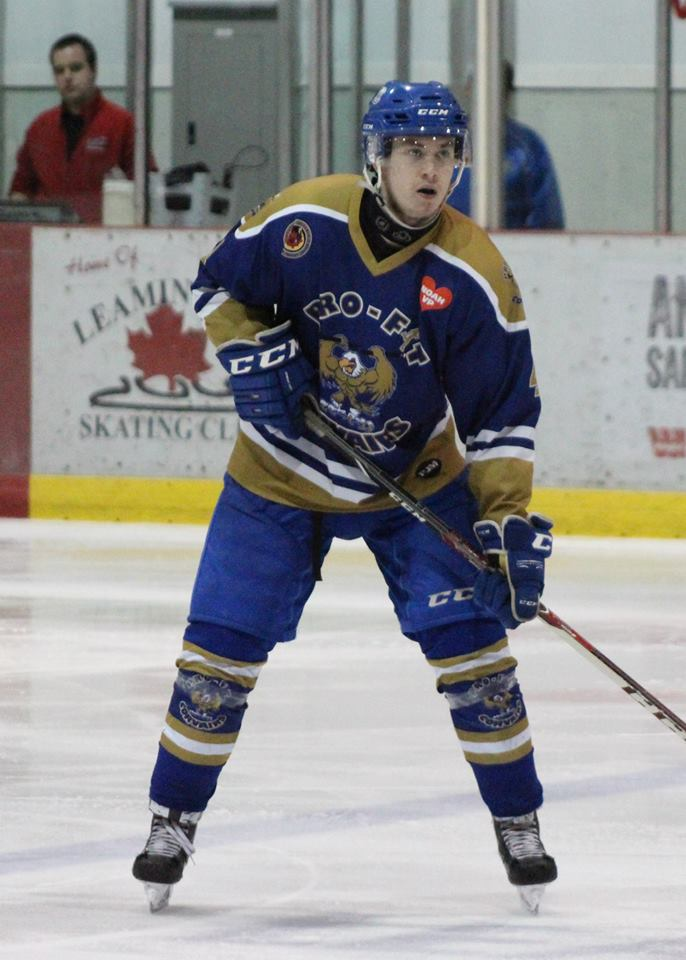
Corvairs player during 2015 playoffs.

== George S. Dudley Trophy Super "C" appearances ==
1976: Woodstock Navy-Vets defeated Brantford Penguins 4-games-to-none

== Notable alumni ==
- Brandon Montour

== See also ==
- Caledonia Corvairs (1961–2012)
