= Stoney Creek Generals (2026) =

- City: Stoney Creek, Ontario, Canada
- League: Greater Ontario Hockey League
- Division: Eastern
- Founded: 1973
- Colours: Black, Yellow, and White
- Owner: Hockey Group
- General manager: Mike Camilleri
- Head coach: Stan Kondrotas
- Affiliates: n/a (OJHL) n/a (PJHL)

Franchise history
- 1973-1976: Owen Sound Salvagemen
- 1976-1977: Owen Sound Steelers
- 1977-1980: Owen Sound Kings
- 1980-1983: Owen Sound Mercurys
- 1983-2000: Owen Sound Greys
- 2000-2006: Owen Sound-Saugeen Shores Greys
- 2006-2012: Owen Sound Greys
- 2012-2020: Brampton Bombers
- 2020-2026: Caledon Bombers
- 2026-Present: Stoney Creek Generals

The Stoney Creek Generals are a Canadian Junior ice hockey club based in Stoney Creek, Ontario. The team was founded as the Owen Sound Salvagemen of the Northern Junior D Hockey League in 1973 but gained prominence as the Owen Sound Greys by winning the 1987 Ontario Junior Hockey League championship. The Greys relocated to Brampton in the Spring of 2012 and then to Caledon in 2020.

On April 1, 2026, the Greater Ontario Hockey League announced that the Caledon Bombers would relocate to Stoney Creek and become the Generals.

== History ==
The history of the Owen Sound Greys dates back to just before World War I. The original Greys won the 1924 Memorial Cup and the 1927 Memorial Cup before falling back to Junior B for much of the next half century. In 1961, the Greys would make their only appearance in the Ontario Junior B final, losing the Sutherland Cup in four-straight-games to the St. Michael's Buzzers. In 1975, the Greys jumped up to Tier II Junior A as members of the Southern Ontario Junior A Hockey League. The league and the team folded in 1977. In the background a team known as the Owen Sound Salvagemen (and briefly the Steelers) were climbing up to replace them. The Salvagemen started off with a season of Junior D and bumped up to the Central Junior C Hockey League for their second season. After both seasons, the Salvagemen entered the Ontario Hockey Association "Super Junior C" playdowns. Both years the Salvagemen would drop the final to the Central Junior C League's Woodstock Navy-Vets.

Owen Sound Kings (after 1977) would spend from 1975 until 1978 in the Mid-Ontario Junior B Hockey League before switching to the Mid-Western Junior B Hockey League. From 1980 until 1983 the team was named the Mercurys for the 1951 Allan Cup champions from Owen Sound. In 1983, the team became the Greys. In 1985, the Greys were promoted to Junior A in an effort to save the failing Ontario Junior Hockey League. In their first year they lost the final, in the second year they won the league, despite falling to the Nickel Centre Power Trains in the next round of the National Junior A Playoffs. In 1987, the Greys were forced to return to Junior B when the OJHL folded.

From 2000 until 2006, the Greys were known as the Owen Sound-Saugeen Shores Greys and split their time in Port Elgin, Ontario. The move was not a hit and attendance dwindled. Back in Owen Sound after 2006, not much changed and the team elected to sit out the 2009–10 season. The Greys would play two more years before team sponsor, David Arsenault, took over the team and moved it to Brampton.

A team naming contest ended May 11, 2012; on June 7, 2012. The name "Brampton Bombers" was announced.

The 2015–16 season saw several technological advancements. The Greater Ontario Junior Hockey League mandated all teams to introduce Internet video broadcast of all home games via FastHockey.com. The Brampton Bombers chose to also introduce Internet radio play-by-play broadcasts via Mixlr.com, thanks to Humber College Radio Broadcast students Nicholas Fiore and Matthew Ahmadzai. Later, the broadcast team introduced their audio broadcast with the FastHockey feed as well, giving fans a choice of free audio or paid audio-video feeds.

In late 2019, the team named Jeff Flanagan as both coach and general manager for the 2019–2020 season.

On April 8, 2020, the Bombers named Chris Taylor as the new head coach.

In 2020, the Bombers announced the move to Caledon, Ontario.

== Season-by-season results ==
Season	GP	W	L	T	OTL	GF	GA	P	Results	Playoffs
Owen Sound Greys (final 5 seasons)
2007-08	48	8	37	2	1	116	219	19	9th GOJHL-MW	DNQ
2008-09	52	6	44	-	2	107	326	14	9th GOJHL-MW	DNQ
2009-10	Did Not Participate									
2010-11	51	4	44	-	3	134	400	11	9th GOJHL-MW	DNQ
2011-12	51	9	39	-	3	150	279	21	9th GOJHL-MW	DNQ
Brampton Bombers
2012-13	51	15	31	-	5	142	217	35	8th GOJHL-MW	Lost Conf. QF
2013-14	49	19	28	-	2	146	174	40	7th GOJHL-MW	Lost Conf. QF
2014-15	49	8	34	-	7	125	254	23	8th GOJHL-MW	Lost Conf. Quarter-final, 0-4 (Sugar Kings)
2015-16	50	14	31	2	3	144	223	31	7th of 9-MW; 21st of 26-GOJHL	Lost Conf. Quarter-final, 0-4 (Cullitons)
2016-17	50	10	33	2	5	123	232	27	9th of 9-MW; 24th of 27-GOJHL	Did not qualify
2017-18	50	16	33	1	0	145	216	33	8th of 8-MW; 19th of 26-GOJHL	Lost Conf. Quarter-final, 0-4 (Sugar Kings)
2018-19	48	8	34	1	5	114	215	22	8th of 8-MW; 23rd of 25-GOJHL	Lost Conf. Quarter-final, 0-4 (Cyclones)
2019-20	50	11	35	0	4	105	232	26	7th of 8-MW; 23rd of 26-GOJHL	Lost Conf. Quarter-final, 1-4 (Dutchmen)
Caledon Bombers
2020-21	Season lost due to COVID-19 pandemic									
2021-22	48	17	28	1	2	135	190	37	7th of 8-MW; 19th of 25-GOJHL	Lost Conf. Quarter-final, 1-4 (Redhawks)
2022-23	50	7	43	0	0	90	282	14	7th of 8-MW; 23rd of 25-GOJHL	Lost Conf. Quarter-final, 0-4 (Warriors)
2023-24	50	5	44	0	1	85	271	11	8th of 8-MW; 23rd of 23-GOJHL	Lost Conf. Quarter-final, 0-4 (Cyclones)
2024-25	50	2	45	2	1	91	291	7	11th of 11-East; 23rd of 23-GOJHL	Did not qualify
2025-26	50	5	45	0	0	107	317	10	11th of 11-East; 22nd of 23-GOJHL	Did not qualify
Stoney Creek Generals
