= Welland Jr. Canadians =

- City: Welland, Ontario, Canada
- League: Greater Ontario Hockey League
- Division: Golden Horseshoe
- Founded: circa 1970
- Home arena: Welland Main Arena
- Colours: Red, Blue, and White
- Owner: Louis Savona
- General manager: Steve Santos
- Head coach: Steve Santos

Franchise history
- 1975-1988: Welland Cougars
- 1988-1991: Welland Aerostars
- 1991-1994: Welland Flames
- 1994-2004: Welland Cougars
- 2004-Present: Welland Jr. Canadians

The Welland Jr. Canadians are a junior ice hockey team based in Welland, Ontario, Canada. They play in the Eastern Conference of the Greater Ontario Hockey League.

== History ==
The Welland franchise, under any of its various names, was formed in 1975 as part of the Niagara District Junior B Hockey League, and joined the Golden Horseshoe "B" in 1979.

For the 1975-76 season, the Cougars (known as the Farr-Learn Bs for their first year) co-existed with the Welland Sabres of the Southern Ontario Junior A Hockey League. They went on to use the monikers of Aerostars - Flames - back to Cougars and in 2004 to the Junior Canadians. The branding they still use now.

Welland have been league champions in the 1977-78, 1979-80, 1982-83, and 1990-91 seasons.

== Season-by-season results ==
| Season | GP | W | L | T | OTL | GF | GA | P | Results | Playoffs |
| 1975-76 | 40 | 26 | 8 | 6 | - | 235 | 142 | 58 | 2nd NDJBHL | |
| 1976-77 | 40 | 31 | 6 | 3 | - | 330 | 144 | 65 | 1st NDJBHL | |
| 1977-78 | 40 | 28 | 11 | 1 | - | 249 | 172 | 57 | 1st NDJBHL | Won League, lost SC QF |
| 1978-79 | 40 | 28 | 10 | 2 | - | -- | -- | 58 | 3rd NDJBHL | Lost semi-final |
| 1979-80 | 44 | 27 | 11 | 6 | - | 314 | 216 | 60 | 3rd GHJHL | Won League |
| 1980-81 | 41 | 22 | 16 | 3 | - | 253 | 228 | 47 | 3rd GHJHL | Lost final |
| 1981-82 | 36 | 18 | 11 | 7 | - | 162 | 137 | 43 | 3rd GHJHL | |
| 1982-83 | 42 | 19 | 19 | 4 | - | 224 | 224 | 42 | 5th GHJHL | Won League |
| 1983-84 | 42 | 14 | 26 | 2 | - | 193 | 229 | 30 | 6th GHJHL | |
| 1984-85 | 42 | 15 | 18 | 9 | - | 221 | 213 | 39 | 7th GHJHL | |
| 1985-86 | 40 | 21 | 14 | 5 | - | 245 | 235 | 47 | 4th GHJHL | |
| 1986-87 | 42 | 27 | 11 | 4 | - | 279 | 192 | 58 | 2nd GHJHL | |
| 1987-88 | 42 | 23 | 15 | 4 | - | 269 | 220 | 50 | 3rd GHJHL | |
| 1988-89 | 42 | 8 | 26 | 8 | - | 188 | 274 | 24 | 8th GHJHL | |
| 1989-90 | 48 | 26 | 20 | 1 | 1 | 336 | 256 | 54 | 5th GHJHL | |
| 1990-91 | 42 | 35 | 4 | 3 | 0 | 273 | 145 | 73 | 1st GHJHL | Won League |
| 1991-92 | 42 | 35 | 4 | 1 | 2 | 308 | 155 | 73 | 1st GHJHL | Lost final |
| 1992-93 | 42 | 28 | 10 | 4 | 0 | 259 | 177 | 60 | 2nd GHJHL | Lost final |
| 1993-94 | 40 | 20 | 16 | 2 | 2 | 234 | 191 | 44 | 4th GHJHL | |
| 1994-95 | 42 | 26 | 14 | 2 | 1 | 226 | 175 | 55 | 2nd GHJHL | |
| 1995-96 | 50 | 16 | 29 | 3 | 2 | 160 | 223 | 37 | 6th GHJHL | |
| 1996-97 | 42 | 18 | 18 | 3 | 3 | 222 | 192 | 42 | 5th GHJHL | |
| 1997-98 | 49 | 27 | 12 | 7 | 3 | 247 | 179 | 64 | 3rd GHJHL | |
| 1998-99 | 47 | 20 | 19 | 6 | 2 | 203 | 184 | 48 | 4th GHJHL | |
| 1999-00 | 48 | 28 | 14 | 4 | 2 | 218 | 159 | 62 | 3rd GHJHL | |
| 2000-01 | 48 | 30 | 14 | 3 | 1 | 196 | 142 | 64 | 3rd GHJHL | |
| 2001-02 | 48 | 18 | 22 | 5 | 3 | 180 | 210 | 44 | 4th GHJHL | |
| 2002-03 | 48 | 28 | 17 | 1 | 2 | 250 | 194 | 59 | 3rd GHJHL | |
| 2003-04 | 48 | 28 | 12 | 7 | 1 | 170 | 118 | 64 | 3rd GHJHL | |
| 2004-05 | 48 | 17 | 25 | 4 | 2 | 171 | 184 | 40 | 6th GHJHL | |
| 2005-06 | 49 | 27 | 16 | 5 | 1 | 218 | 185 | 60 | 4th GHJHL | Lost semi-final |
| 2006-07 | 49 | 26 | 21 | 2 | 0 | 250 | 217 | 54 | 5th GHJHL | Lost quarter-final |
| 2007-08 | 49 | 28 | 19 | 1 | 1 | 257 | 206 | 58 | 5th GOJHL-GH | |
| 2008-09 | 52 | 19 | 28 | - | 5 | 218 | 286 | 43 | 6th GOJHL-GH | |
| 2009-10 | 51 | 18 | 23 | - | 10 | 175 | 207 | 46 | 5th GOJHL-GH | Lost Conf. QF |
| 2010-11 | 51 | 29 | 17 | - | 5 | 232 | 166 | 63 | 4th GOJHL-GH | Lost Conf. QF |
| 2011-12 | 50 | 26 | 22 | - | 2 | 184 | 185 | 54 | 5th GOJHL-GH | Lost Conf. QF |
| 2012-13 | 51 | 35 | 15 | - | 1 | 199 | 134 | 71 | 3rd GOJHL-GH | Lost Conf. Final |
| 2013-14 | 49 | 29 | 15 | - | 5 | 176 | 153 | 63 | 3rd GOJHL-GH | Lost Conf. SF |
| 2014-15 | 49 | 32 | 15 | - | 2 | 181 | 119 | 66 | 3rd GOJHL-GH | Won Conf. Quarter-finals, 4-1 (Meteors); Lost Conf. semi-finals, 4-1 (Falcons) |
| 2015-16 | 50 | 17 | 25 | 4 | 4 | 137 | 175 | 42 | 7th GOJHL-GH | Lost Conf. Quarter-finals, 1-4 (Falcons) |
| 2016-17 | 50 | 22 | 26 | 0 | 2 | 178 | 188 | 46 | 6th GOJHL-GH | Lost Conf. Quarter-finals, 0-4 (Canucks) |
| 2017-18 | 50 | 17 | 28 | 3 | 2 | 128 | 218 | 39 | 6th GOJHL-GH | Lost Conf. Quarter-finals, 0-4 (Avalanche) |
| 2018-19 | 48 | 8 | 36 | 0 | 4 | 117 | 251 | 20 | 7th GOJHL-GH | Lost Conf. Quarter-finals, 0-4 (Falcons) |
| 2019-20 | 50 | 5 | 41 | 0 | 4 | 109 | 267 | 14 | 9th -GH; 26th - GOJHL | did not qualify for post season |
| 2020-21 | Season not played due to the COVID-19 pandemic | | | | | | | | | |
| 2021-22 | 48 | 19 | 26 | 3 | 0 | 124 | 170 | 41 | 5th -GH; 16th - GOJHL | Lost Conf. Quarter-finals, 0-4 (Meteors) |
| 2022-23 | 50 | 13 | 31 | 5 | 1 | 127 | 206 | 32 | 7th -GH; 20th - GOJHL | Lost Conf. Quarter-finals, 1-4 (Kilty B's) |
| 2023-24 | 50 | 15 | 31 | 4 | 0 | 112 | 208 | 34 | 5th of 7 GH; 18th/23 GOJHL | Lost Conf. Quarter-finals, 3-4 (Kilty B's) |
| 2024-25 | 50 | 12 | 35 | 3 | 0 | 135 | 257 | 27 | 6th of 11 East; 21st/23 GOJHL | Did Not Qualify |
| 2025-26 | 50 | 7 | 40 | 3 | 0 | 124 | 301 | 17 | 10th of 11 East; 21st/23 GOJHL | Did Not Qualify |

== Notable alumni ==
- Yvon Corriveau
- Adam Creighton
- Ray Emery
- Wayne Groulx
- Bill Huard
- Matt Johnson
- Bob LaForest
- Mark LaForest
- Lou Nistico
- Krzysztof Oliwa
- Dan Paille
- Bob Sneddon
- Cal Clutterbuck
- Dan Girardi
- Jamie Tardif
- Matt Ellis
- Paul Bissonnette
- Andre Deveaux
