= Listowel Cyclones =

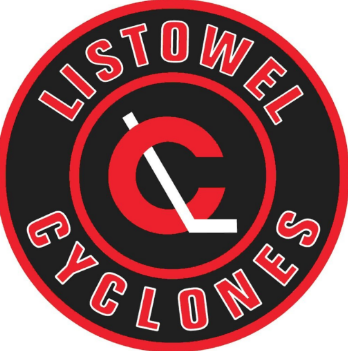
- City: Listowel, Ontario, Canada
- League: Greater Ontario Hockey League
- Division: Mid-Western
- Founded: 1972
- Home arena: Steve Kerr Memorial Complex
- Colours: Black, Red, and White
- General manager: Trent McClement
- Head coach: Jesse Cole
- Affiliates: Wingham Ironmen (PJHL)

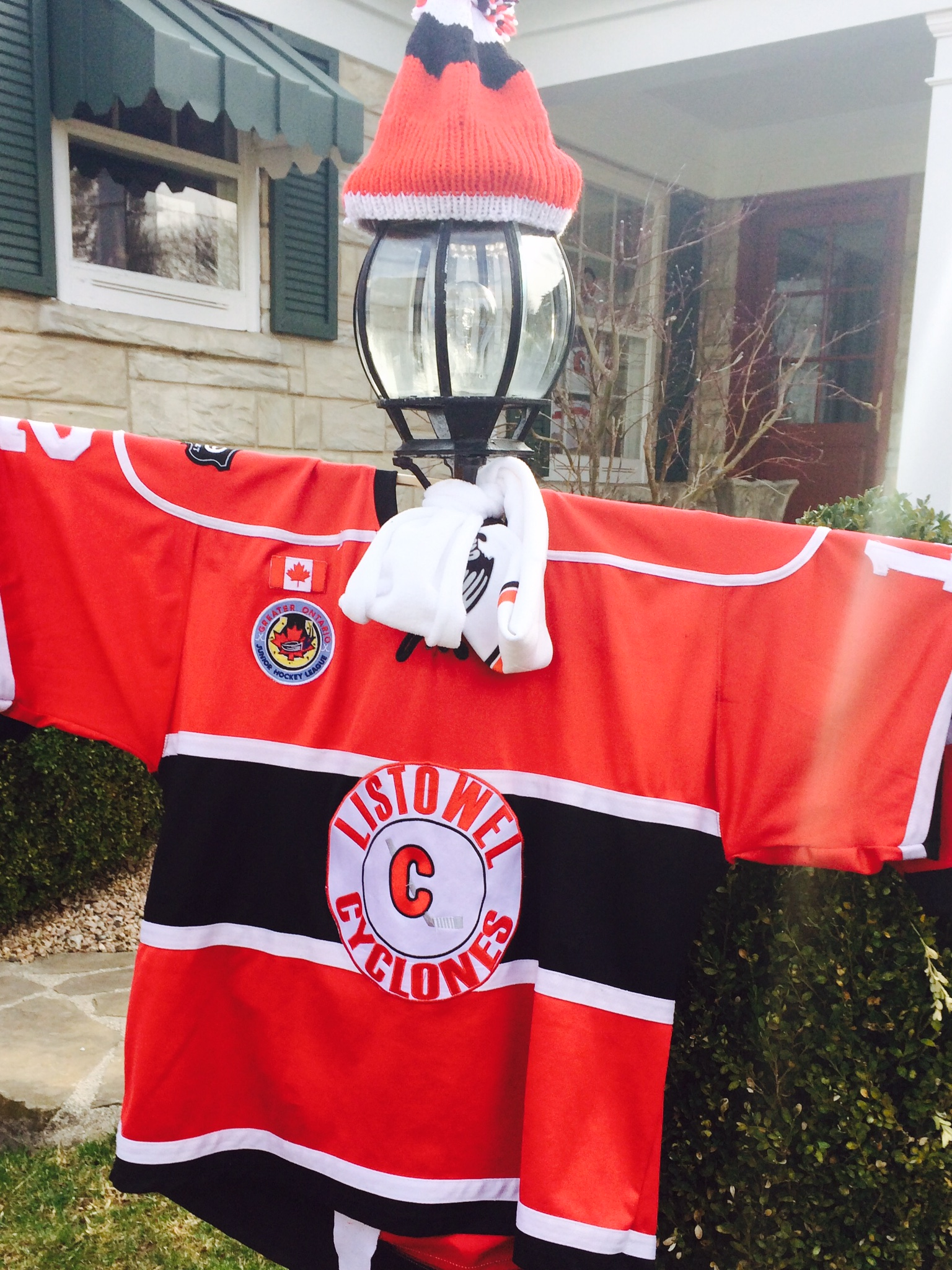
Listowel Cyclones

The Listowel Cyclones are a junior ice hockey team based in Listowel, Ontario, Canada. They play in the Western Division of the Greater Ontario Hockey League. They currently play at the Steve Kerr Memorial Complex.

== History and the early years ==
The Listowel Cyclones were named after famous local professional hockey player Fred "Cyclone" Taylor.

Founded in 1972, the team started out in the Central Junior C Hockey League, but moved up to Midwestern "B" in 1979. The team had horrible results in the '80s, sometimes going for months without a single victory. The '90s were decent to the Cyclones, but by 1999 the team fell into some bad years. The Cyclones had their coming out party in 2005 though, winning the league championship for the first time in history to earn the right to compete for the Sutherland Cup, another team first.

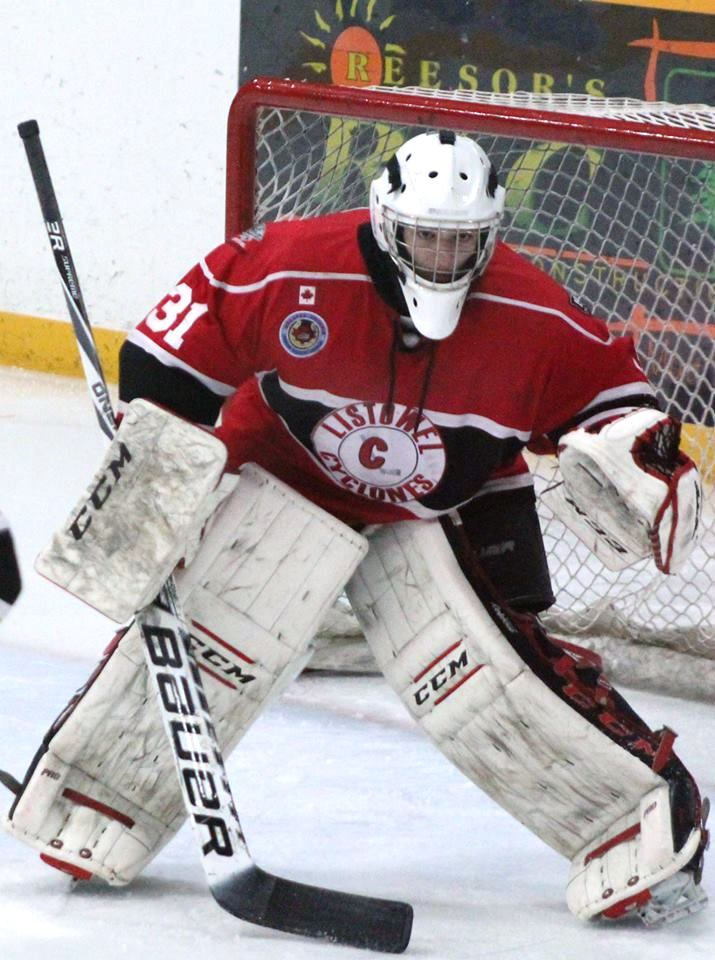
Cyclones goalie Tyler Fassl during 2014–15 season.

The Cyclones hold the record for the worst defeat in Mid-Western "B" history: a 23–3 loss to the Waterloo Siskins on December 11, 1983. They won a league title in 2005 as the 7th seed in the playoffs, setting a record for the lowest entry seed to win the championship in league history. They also came in third in the Sutherland Cup Round Robin, losing out to the Chatham Maroons and the eventual champion Thorold Blackhawks.

== The modern years ==
After a franchise best of 33 wins in 2015–2016 (this record was broken the following year in the 2016-2017 season), the Listowel Cyclones were swept 4–0 by the 6th seed Waterloo Siskins in the GOJHL playoffs. Waterloo went on to upset the Kitchener Dutchmen in the second round but lost in the final of the Cherrey Cup to the Stratford Cullitons.

The 2016–2017 roster was composed of several returning players and OHL training camps invitees including Jackob Lee (11th round, Guelph Storm), Holdyn Lansink (12th round, Erie Otters), Brock Baier (10th round, Windsor Spitfires), Chet Phillips (4th round, Saginaw Spirit), Brendan Cederberg (11th round, Peterborough Petes) and Ben Derrough (Owen Sound Attack). The key losses for the team this year is last year's starting goalie Tyler Fassl and their leading scorer from last year Jamie Huber. Tyler Fassl has moved on to the OJHL's Trenton Goldenhawks, defensemen Kade Landry is now with the OHL's Barrie Colts, Jordan Caskenette is with Walkerton Hawks (Jr.C), defensemen Scott Pederson is now playing in the CIS for Laurentian University and 2015-2016 leading scorer Jamie Huber has moved on to the Prince George Spruce Kings of the BCHL. Other notable losses from the 2015-2016 team that were key players in Listowel's record winning season include Tim Nauta, Ben Shelley, Ray McFalls, Corey Flemington and Austin Huizenga. The 2016–2017 team co-captains are veteran locals Caleb Warren and Blake Nichol. The team will also have alternating away and home assistant captains. Alternate captains include Riley Robertson, Keaton Willis, Brady Anderson and Holdyn Lansink. Midway through the season, the team added former Cyclone Ben VanOotegham from the Pembroke Lumberkings of the CCHL. VanOotegham previously played for the Listowel Cyclones in 2013-2014 and 2014-2015 seasons. Halfway through the 2016-2017 GOJHL season the Cyclones were in 1st place in the Midwestern division and look to break last year's franchise win record with a 20–2–2 start. On December 8, 2016, last year's leading scorer Jamie Huber returned from the BCHL to rejoin the team in their record setting season. Along with Huber, the Cyclones added more offensive power by welcoming 3 year OHL veteran and Exeter native Cullen Mercer to the line up on January 7, 2017.

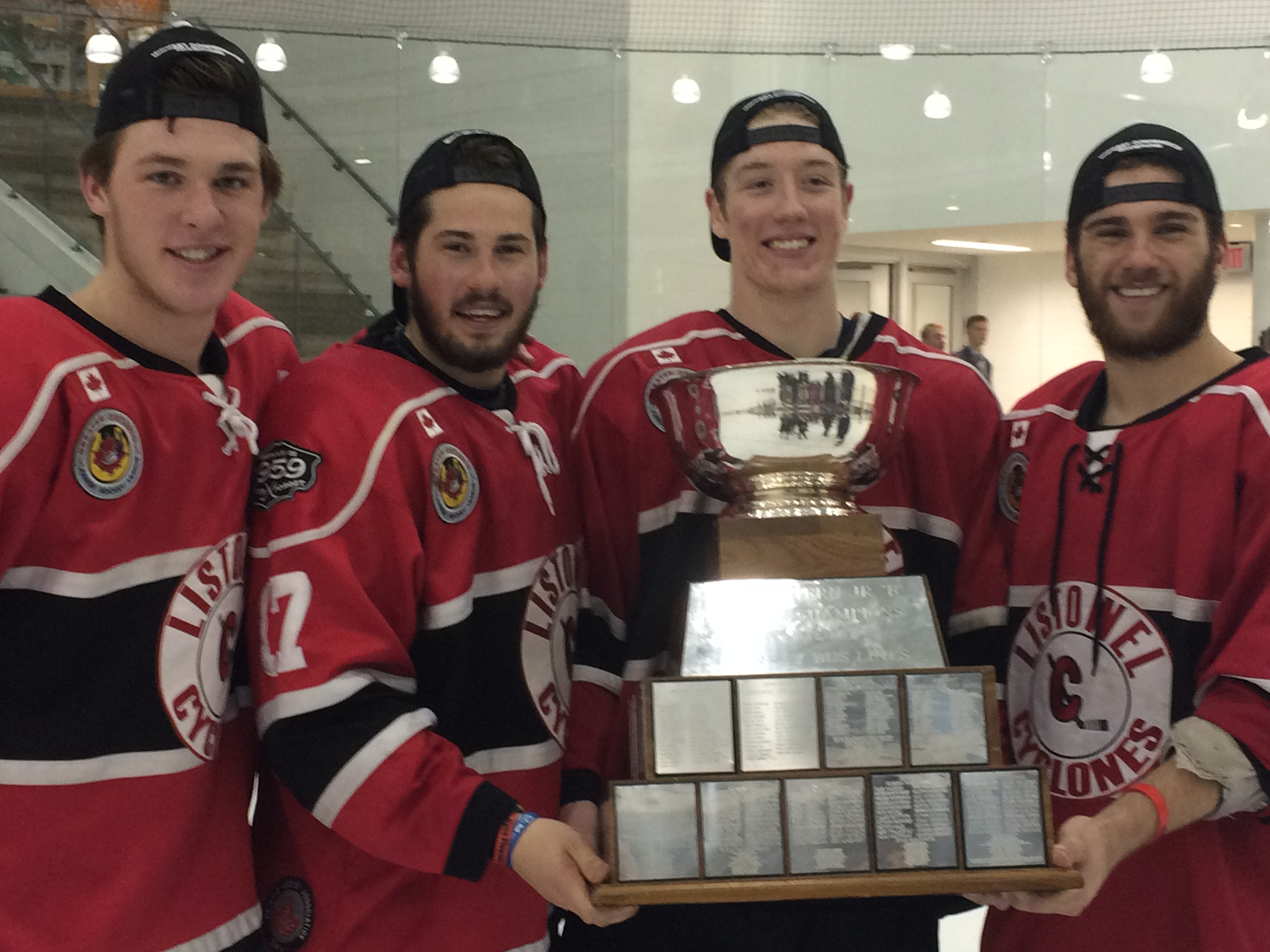
Cyclones forwards Blake Nichol, Jamie Huber, Cullen Mercer and Ben Van Ootegham with the Cherrey Cup

The Listowel Cyclones began the 2017- 2018 season playing at the Listowel Memorial Arena. On Saturday December 9, 2017, the Cyclones played their first game in the new Steve Kerr Memorial Complex against the Statford Warriors. They defeated the Stratford Warriors 7-2 in front of 1,503 fans. Jakob Lee scored the first goal in the new building at 5:18 of the 1st period.

After a tremendous 2016-2017 and 2017-2018 season the Listowel Cyclones experienced many changes. The Cyclones lost several over-age players that played an integral role in the teams Cherrey Cup and Sutherland Cup championship season such as Blake Nichol, Caleb Warren, Cullen Mercer, Ben VanOtegham, Keaton Willis, Brady Anderson, Brett Primeau, Tommy Hoogars and Garrett Russell. Several players also moved up the junior hockey ranks to others teams, including goalie Max Wright (Brooks Bandits, AJHL), Max Coyle (Prince George Spruce Kings, BCHL), Jakob Lee (Brooks Bandits, AJHL), Mitch Deelstra (Alberni Valley Bulldogs, BCHL) and Danny Skinner (Lasalle Vipers, GOJHL).

== Season records ==
On February 12, 2017 the Listowel Cyclones broke their franchise single season wins record with a convincing 34th win over the Elmira Sugar Kings (6-3) and reclaimed sole possession of 1st place in the midwestern conference of the GOJHL. They previously set the single season franchise record last year with 33 wins. What has turned out to be a season of firsts, on February 23, 2017, the Listowel Cyclones defeated the Cambridge Winterhawks 4–0 and are the first Jr. B Listowel Cyclone team in 38 years and franchise history to clinch 1st place in the midwestern conference of the GOJHL

On February 19, 2018, the Cyclones broke their single season record of wins (40) again with a 2-1 win over their rivals the Statford Warriors. They then defeated the Brantford 99ers 4 days later 5-1 and have set the franchise record for season wins at 42.

== 2017 Cherrey Cup champions ==
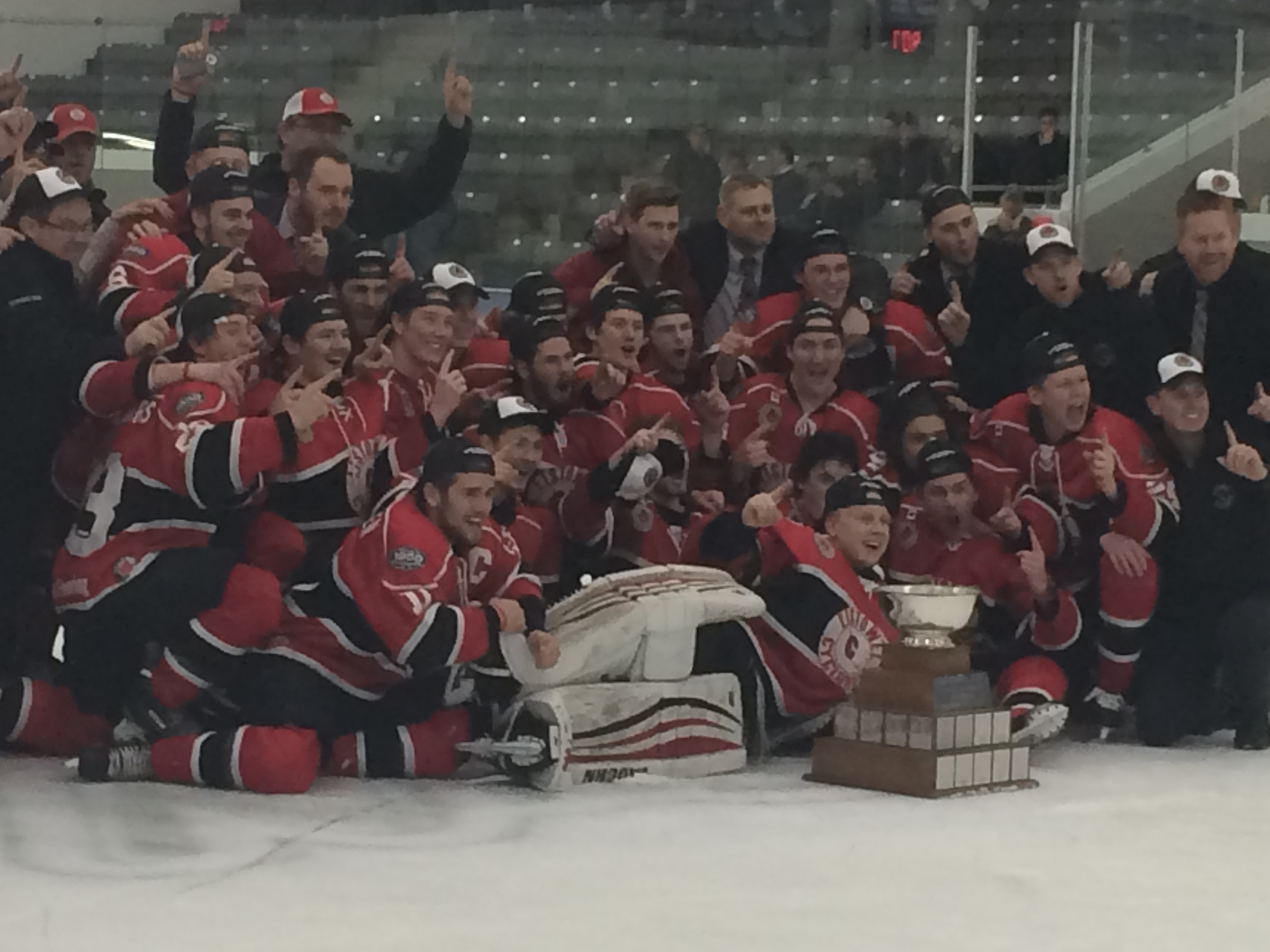
Listowel Cyclones 2017 Cherrey Cup Champions

The Cyclones began the 2017 playoffs by facing the 8th seed the Brantford 99ers in the conference quarterfinals and defeated the 99ers with 4 straight wins to win the series 4–0. In the next round the Cyclones faced off against the Waterloo Siskins. This series was especially sentimental for cyclone players who were part of the team last year that was swept in heart breaking fashion (4–0). The Cyclones won the first 2 games in convincing fashion, 6–0 and 7–1. The Cyclones won game #3 3–2 in overtime with Jamie Huber scoring the overtime winner. [16] On March 22, 2017 the Cyclones defeated the Siskins 6–2 in Waterloo, completing the sweep and won some redemption after last year's sweep in Waterloo on March 9, 2016. The game was marked by Cullen Mercer scoring 4 goals in eight minutes in the second period. [17] CTV news Kitchener referred to Mercer as the "one man cyclone" after his 4 goal performance. The Listowel Cyclones advanced to the Cherrey Cup finals for the first time since 2011. [18]

After losing the first two games of the series to the Elmira Sugar Kings (3–2 OT and 3–2), the Listowel Cyclones rallied back to win 4 straight games and win the Cherrey Cup on April 9, 2017. This was the franchise's second Cherrey Cup win, the other being in 2004–05.

== 2018 Cherrey Cup champions ==
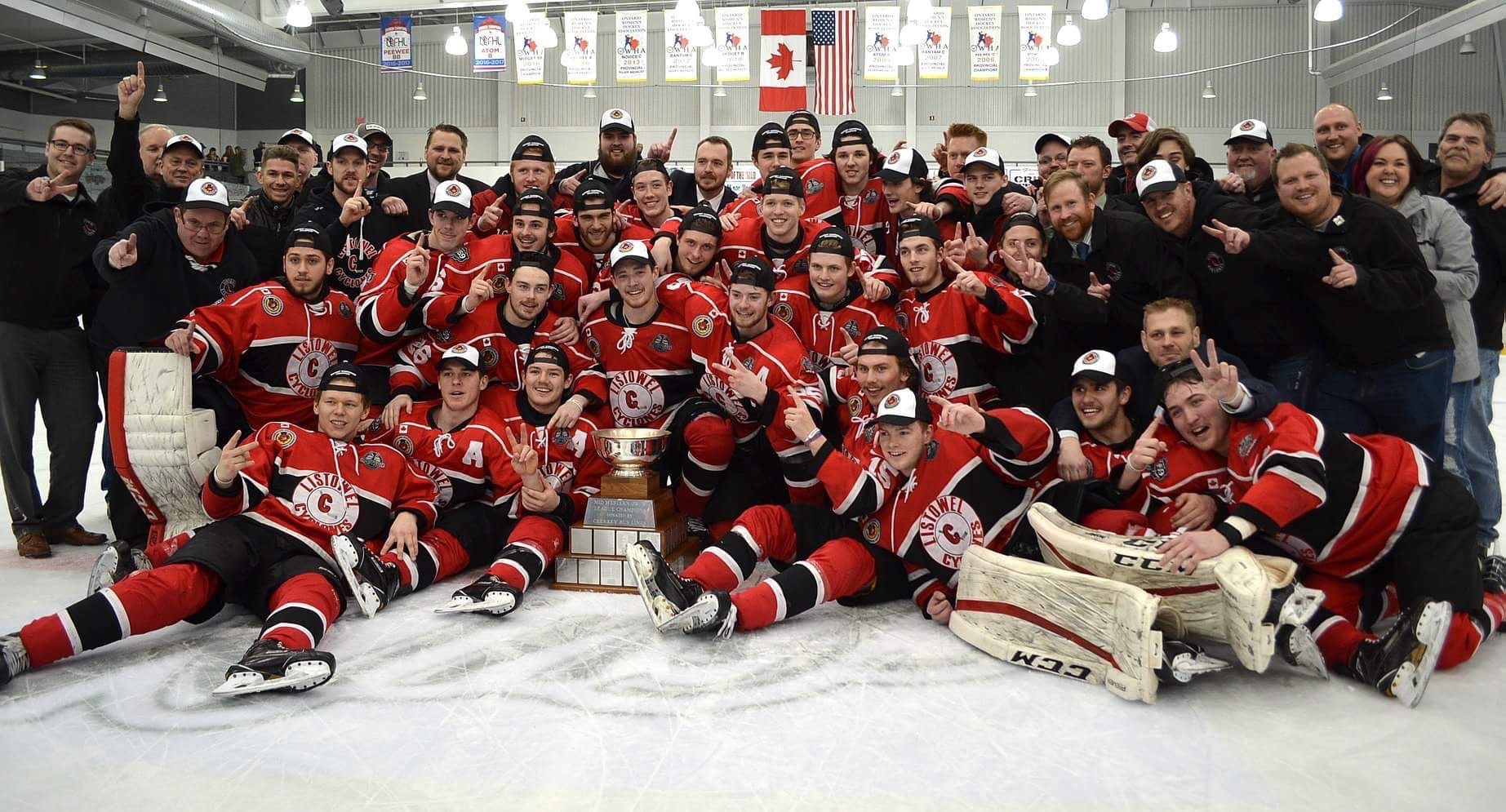
2018 Cherrey Cup Champions

The Cyclones began the 2018 playoffs facing the 8th seed Guelph Hurricanes. The Cyclones swept the Guelph Hurricanes 4-0. The Cyclones then faced the 4th seed Waterloo Siskins in the second round. This series was a true test for the Cyclones that went 7 games with Listowel Cyclones defeating the Waterloo Siskins 4-3 on March 26, 2018 with AP player Trent Verbeek scoring the game winning goal. After defeating the Siskins in dramatic fashion while facing several injuries the Cyclones defended their Cherrey cup championship against the Elmira Sugar Kings; defeating them in the final for the second straight year. The Cyclones rallied around their previous round adversity and defeated the Elmira Sugar Kings 4-0 and won their 3rd franchise Cherrey Cup on April 4, 2018. The Cyclones faced the London Nationals again in the first round of the Sutherland Cup and Elmira clinched the wildcard spot in the Sutherland Cup and played the Caledonia Corvairs; both being repeat 1st round match-ups from last year's Sutherland Cup.

== 2017 Sutherland Cup ==
The Listowel Cyclones who ranked at number one in the list played against the London Nationals, the Western Conference champions, in the semi-finals of the Sutherland Cup. The London Nationals beat the Listowel Cyclones 3-2 in overtime in Game 5 on April 21, 2017, and won the match 4-1. Even after the defeat in the semi-finals, the Listowel Cyclones managed to break some new records for themselves during the 2016-17 season.

== 2018 Sutherland Cup champions ==
The Listowel Cyclones started the Sutherland Cup semi-finals as the 3rd-ranked team and faced the Golden Horseshoe Champions Caledonia Pro Fit Corvairs in the finals after defeating the London Nationals 4-2 in the semi-finals. On Tuesday May 1, 2018, the Listowel Cyclones defeated the Caledonia Pro Fit Corvairs and completed the 4-game sweep (4–3, 6–3, 2–1, 4–1) to earn the organization's first-ever Junior B Sutherland Cup Championship.

== 2018–2019 season ==
After winning the Sutherland Cup and Cherrey Cup in the 2017–2018 and losing a lot of players many thought the 2018–2019 season would be a rebuilding year. The 2018–2019 season was anything but a hangover season as many expected. The Cyclones exceeded expectations with only a handful of returning players from the 2018 championship team. Led by co-captains Holdyn Lansink and Chayse Herrfort the Cyclones completed the 2018–2019 regular season in first place for the third time to retain their regular season championship. However, the Cyclones were not able to retain their Cherrey Cup championship as they lost in the Cherrey Cup final to the Waterloo Siskins 4 games to 2. Luckily after being eliminated the Cyclones qualified as the Wild Card team for the Sutherland but lost to the London Nationals in the semifinal 4 games to 2.

The 2018–2019 season also saw two of their leaders hit the record books. Chayse Herrfort broke Ben Shelley's record (237 games) for most franchise games played with 244 games. Holdyn Lansink also set the franchise record for most points, goals and assists in a single season (48 games- 46 goals- 65 assists- 111 points). Lansink also set the franchise record for all-time goals, assists and points (120 goals- 170 assists-290 points). Lansink's impressive record breaking season also earned the OHA Jr B player of the year award.

The 2018–2019 season was also a special season as it was Jason Brooks' last season as head coach of the Cyclones. Over the 5 years, Brooks has led the team to 170 season wins, 3 Midwestern conference season championships, 3 Cherrey Cup appearances, 2 Cherrey Cup championships, 3 Sutherland Cup appearances and the franchise's first-ever Sutherland Cup Championship in 2018. Brooks is credited for developing the Cyclones program into a reputable Junior B organization. It was announced following the 2018–2019 season that assistant coach Jeese Cole would become the new head coach for the 2019–2020 season.

== Current staff ==
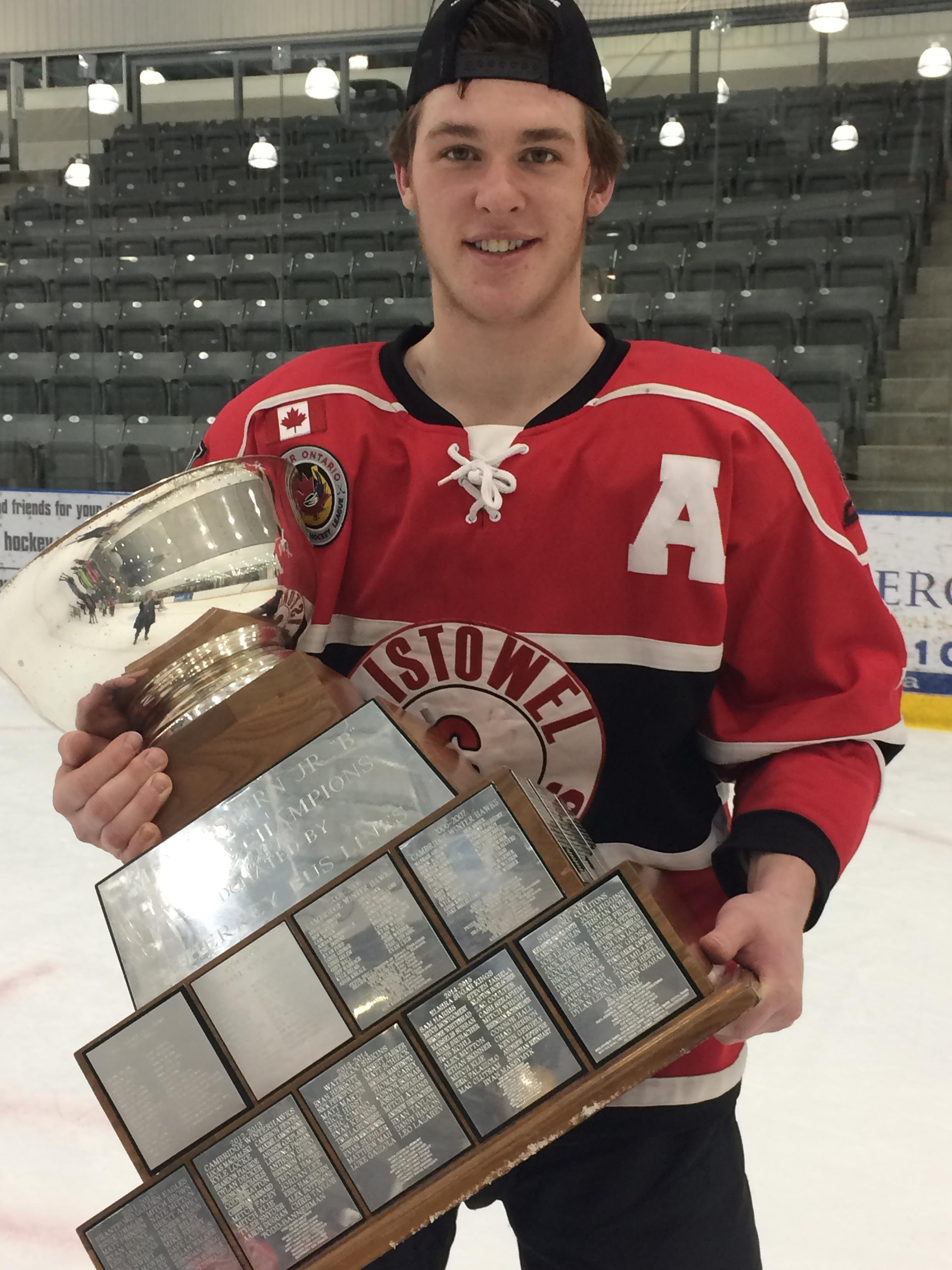
Co-Captain Blake Nichol with the 2017 Cherrey Cup

2019–2020 Staff:

- Jesse Cole: General Manager/Head Coach
- Brett Nichol: Assistant Coach
- Brady Anderson: Assistant Coach
- Jeff Goldie: Assistant Coach
- Dr. Brent Milljour: Trainer/Chiropractor
- Mark Kennedy: Equipment Manager
- Wayne Long: President
- Randy Petrie: Assistant General Manager
- Jason Brooks: Hockey Operations
- Brad Haines: Vice President
- Jenesta Davidson: Vice President
- Matt Fischer: Strength and Conditioning Coach
- Team Chapel Leader: John Farnworth
- Billet Coordinator: Rick Cameron
- Videographers: Nick Townsend

The team also has a group of game-day volunteers, executive members, scouts, and other support staff that play an integral role in the team's day-to-day operations of the hockey club.

== Season-by-season record ==
Season	GP	W	L	T	OTL	GF	GA	P	Results	Playoffs
1972-73	31	19	10	2	-	--	--	40	3rd CJCHL	
1973-74	33	10	17	6	-	133	198	26	5th CJCHL	
1974-75	29	15	12	2	-	159	132	32	4th CJCHL II	
1975-76	30	17	10	3	-	169	162	37	3rd CJCHL II	
1976-77	36	28	7	1	-	359	130	57	1st CJCHL	Won League
1977-78	35	25	8	2	-	237	124	52	1st CJCHL	Won League
1978-79	30	17	10	3	-	165	139	37	3rd CJCHL	
1979-80	42	14	24	4	-	200	268	32	8th MWJBHL	DNQ
1980-81	42	20	22	0	-	187	205	40	5th MWJBHL	Lost semi-final
1981-82	42	23	17	2	-	235	187	48	5th MWJBHL	Lost quarter-final
1982-83	42	17	25	0	-	220	275	34	5th MWJBHL	Lost quarter-final
1983-84	42	4	38	0	-	151	340	8	8th MWJBHL	DNQ
1984-85	42	8	33	1	-	178	337	17	8th MWJBHL	DNQ
1985-86	40	2	38	0	-	119	402	4	6th MWJBHL	DNQ
1986-87	40	13	26	1	-	191	279	27	5th MWJBHL	Lost quarter-final
1987-88	48	20	27	1	-	266	298	41	7th MWJBHL	Lost quarter-final
1988-89	48	23	25	0	-	247	305	46	3rd MWJBHL	Lost quarter-final
1989-90	48	6	42	0	-	171	411	12	9th MWJBHL	DNQ
1990-91	48	7	41	0	-	159	359	14	9th MWJBHL	DNQ
1991-92	48	22	24	2	-	224	207	46	5th MWJBHL	Lost quarter-final
1992-93	48	28	18	2	-	234	192	58	5th MWJBHL	Lost quarter-final
1993-94	48	27	17	4	-	259	176	58	4th MWJBHL	Lost semi-final
1994-95	48	26	20	2	-	260	204	54	6th MWJBHL	Lost quarter-final
1995-96	48	15	29	4	-	165	212	34	8th MWJBHL	Lost quarter-final
1996-97	48	21	22	5	-	254	232	47	6th MWJBHL	Lost quarter-final
1997-98	48	10	34	4	-	156	249	24	8th MWJBHL	Lost quarter-final
1998-99	48	17	27	4	-	173	228	38	8th MWJBHL	Lost quarter-final
1999-00	47	4	40	3	-	115	277	11	10th MWJBHL	DNQ
2000-01	48	9	37	2	-	161	269	20	9th MWJBHL	DNQ
2001-02	48	14	32	2	-	158	237	30	8th MWJBHL	
2002-03	48	17	24	7	2	166	226	43	8th MWJBHL	
2003-04	48	18	25	1	4	169	193	41	7th MWJBHL	
2004-05	48	21	19	5	3	171	156	50	7th MWJBHL	Won League
2005-06	48	23	23	2	-	191	174	48	6th MWJBHL	Lost semi-final
2006-07	48	25	16	5	2	169	148	57	3rd MWJBHL	Lost semi-final
2007-08	48	29	14	4	1	151	126	63	2nd GOJHL-MW	Lost Conf. SF
2008-09	52	30	14	-	8	212	161	68	4th GOJHL-MW	
2009-10	51	27	23	-	1	179	188	55	3rd GOJHL-MW	Lost Conf. QF
2010-11	51	31	16	-	4	231	160	66	5th GOJHL-MW	Lost Conf. Final
2011-12	51	18	30	-	3	176	216	39	6th GOJHL-MW	Lost Conf. QF
2012-13	51	28	20	-	3	206	185	59	6th GOJHL-MW	
2013-14	49	16	25	-	8	143	194	40	8th GOJHL-MW	Lost Conf. QF
2014-15	49	21	26	-	2	131	145	44	7th GOJHL-MW	Lost Conf. QF, 1–4 (Dutchmen)
2015-16	50	33	17	0	0	196	156	66	3rd of 9-MW; 8th of 26-GOJHL	Lost Conf. QF, 0–4 (Siskins)
2016-17	50	40	7	1	2	215	104	83	1st of 9-MW; 3rd of 27-GOJHL	Won Conf. QF, 4–0 (99ers); Won Conf. SF, 4-0 (Siskins); Won Conf. Final, 4–2 (Sugar Kings); Lost Sutherland Cup SF 1–4 (London Nationals)
2017-18	50	43	5	0	2	232	100	88	1st of 8-MW; 2nd of 26-GOJHL	Won Conf. QF, 4–0 (Hurricanes); Won Conf. SF, 4-3 (Siskins); Won Conf. Final, 4-0 (Sugar Kings); Won Sutherland Cup SF, 4-2 (Nationals); Won Sutherland Cup, 4-0 (Corvairs)
2018-19	48	33	11	0	4	188	122	70	1st of 8-MW; 5th of 25-GOJHL	Won Conf. QF, 4–0 (Bombers); Won Conf. SF, 4-1 (Dutchmen); Lost Conf. Final, 2-4 (Siskins) advance as WILD CARD; Lost Sutherland Cup SF, 2-4 (Nationals)
2019-20	50	24	19	0	7	123	131	55	5th of 8-MW; 14th of 26-GOJHL	Lost Conf. QF, 1-4 (Warriors)
2020-21	Season cancelled due to pandemic									
2021-22	48	17	25	5	1	130	162	40	6th of 8-MW; 18th of 25-GOJHL	Lost Conf. QF, 0-4 (Siskins)
2022-23	50	17	25	5	1	130	162	40	6th of 8-MW; 18th of 25-GOJHL	Lost Conf. QF, 0-4 (Siskins)
2023-24	50	38	9	1	2	206	103	79	1st of 8-MW; 2nd of 23-GOJHL	Won Conf. QF, 4-0 (Bombers); Won Conf SF, 4-0 (Centennials); Won Conf Finals 4-1 (Warriors); 3-1 Dbl Rd Robin (Meteors) & (Lincolns); Advance to finals Won Sutherland Cup 4-1 (Lincolns)
2024-25	50	32	14	3	1	199	142	68	4th of 12 West Conf; 7th of 23-GOJHL	Lost Conf. QF, 0-4 (Nationals)
2025-26	50	20	27	2	1	146	164	43	10th of 12 West Conf; 16th of 23-GOJHL	Did Not Qualify for Post Season Play

== Championships ==
- Cherrey Cup Midwestern Champions: 2005, 2017, 2018
- Midwestern Conference Regular Season Champions: 2016-17, 2017–18, 2018-2019
- Sutherland Cup GOJHL Champions: 2018, 2024

== Sutherland Cup appearances ==
2017: Listowel Cyclones lost to London Nationals 4-games-to-1 in Semifinals
2018: Listowel Cyclones defeated London Nationals 4-games-to-2 in Semifinals and defeated Caledonia Corvairs 4-games-to-0 in Sutherland Cup Final
2019: Listowel Cyclones lost to London Nationals 4-games-to-2 in Semifinals
2024: Listowel Cyclones defeated St. Marys Lincolns 4-games-to-1 in Sutherland Cup Final

== Notable alumni ==
- Jeff Bloemberg
- Dwayne Hay
- Brett MacLean
- Tye McGinn
- Nick Spaling
- Jared Keeso
