= Nature Fresh Farms Recreation Centre =

Recreation centre in Leamington, Ontario

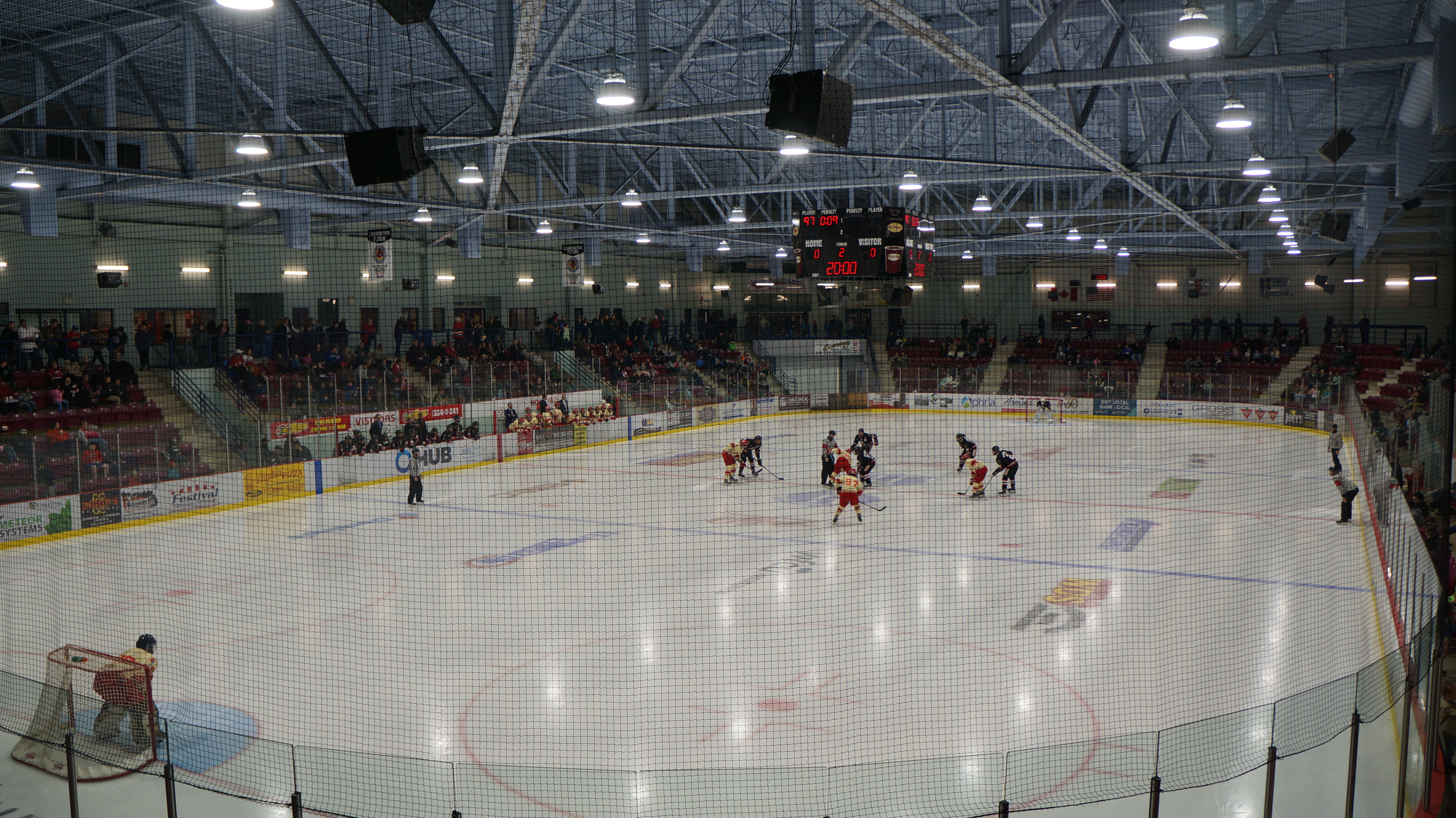
- Interactive map of Nature Fresh Farms Recreation Centre
- Former names: F.T. Sherk Aquatic and Fitness Centre (1985-2000); Leamington Kinsmen Recreation Complex (2000-2020)
- Address: 249 Sherk Street
- Location: Leamington, Ontario, Canada
- Coordinates: 42.0424667°N 082.6060667°W
- Owner: The Corporation of The Municipality of Leamington, Ontario
- Capacity: Highbury Canco Arena: 2,500; Unico Arena: 200

Construction
- Opened: 1985
- Expanded: 2000

Tenant
- Leamington Flyers (Highbury Canco Arena)

Website
- Official Website

The Nature Fresh Farms Recreation Centre, formerly known as the Leamington Kinsmen Recreation Complex, is a recreation centre in Leamington, Ontario, Canada. The facility was opened in 1985 as the F.T. Sherk Aquatic and Fitness Centre.

The complex was expanded in 2000, providing the community with access to two ice pads, and a fitness and aquatic centre.

On May 12, 2020, the Municipality of Leamington announced new sponsorship and naming rights for Leamington’s recreational complex to Nature Fresh Farms Recreation Centre.

== Facilities ==
=== Highbury Canco Arena ===
Added to the complex in 2000 as the Heinz Arena, Highbury Canco Arena is the home of the 2 time defending Western Conference Champion Leamington Flyers of the Ontario Junior Hockey League. The arena has an Olympic (or international) sized ice surface with bowl seating for up to 1,500 people. Highbury Canco Arena is also used by local minor hockey teams and the Leamington Skating Club.

The former Heinz Arena name was changed after the main sponsor of the arena, Heinz, ended Canadian production of its products in Leamington. On August 15, 2015, the Heinz Arena became the Highbury Canco Arena

=== Unico Arena ===
Unico Arena was also added in the renovations done to the complex in 2000. The Unico Arena has an NHL (or North American) sized ice pad with seating for 200 people.

=== The F.T. Sherk Aquatic and Fitness Centre ===
The original portion of the current complex is the F.T. Sherk Aquatic and Fitness Centre. This portion of the complex houses:

- 25 meter indoor saltwater swimming pool
- An indoor walking/jogging track
- Weight training and cardio fitness rooms
- Racquetball and squash courts
- Gym
- A fitness studio
- An indoor cycling studio

The municipality offers gym memberships to the public, and there are currently over 3,000 members.
