= Chatham Maroons =

- City: Chatham, Ontario, Canada
- League: Greater Ontario Hockey League
- Division: Western
- Founded: 1959
- Home arena: Chatham Memorial Arena
- Colours: Maroon, Brown, and White
- Owners: Bill and Karen Szekesy
- General manager: Richard Santos
- Head coach: Richard Santos
- Affiliates: Blenheim Blades (PJHL) Saginaw Spirit (OHL)
- Website: https://www.chathammaroons.com/

Franchise history
- 1959-1976: Chatham Maroons
- 1976-1978: Chatham Maple City Fords
- 1978-1988: Chatham Maroons
- 1988-1995: Chatham MicMac
- 1995-Present: Chatham Maroons

Championships
- Conference titles: 1990, 1991 1998, 1999, 2000, 2001, 2004, 2005, 2006, 2022, 2025
- Playoff championships: 1999, 2025 Sutherland Cup Champions

The Chatham Maroons are a junior ice hockey team based in Chatham, Ontario, Canada. They play in the Western division of the Greater Ontario Hockey League (GOJHL). The Maroons were the 1970 Western Ontario Junior A Champions and 1973 Southern Ontario Junior A Champions. The Maroons have won Twice won the Sutherland Cup as Ontario Hockey Association Junior B Champions in 1999 and 2025. In the 2021-2022 season, the Maroons won the GOJHL Western Conference Championship 4-2 over the Leamington Flyers. The Maroons dedicated their Championship in honour of their longtime equipment manager and team volunteer, Randy DeWael, who died suddenly during the playoffs.

== History ==
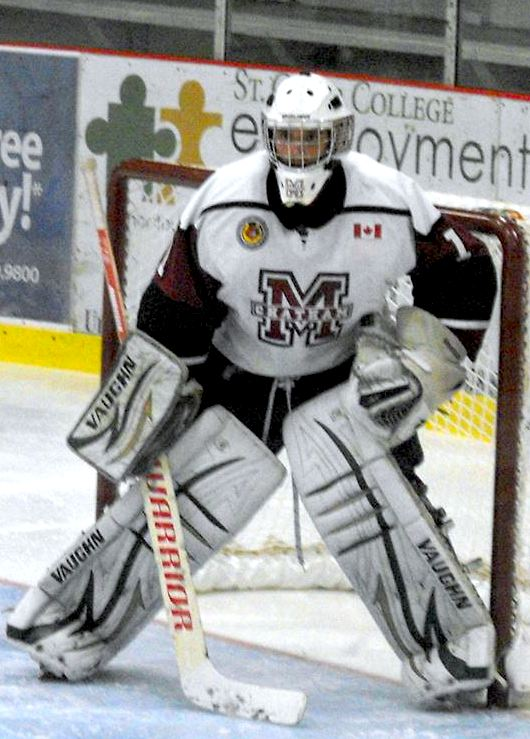
Maroons goalie at home 2013-14.

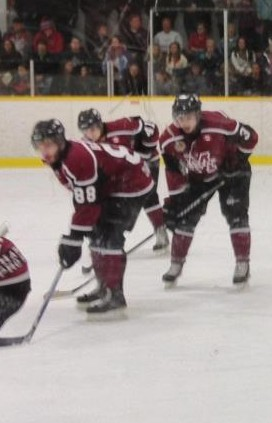
Maroons line up for a draw in 2013 playoffs.

The Maroons originated in the Border Cities Junior B Hockey League in 1959. The team later moved to the stronger Western Junior "B" league in 1964 and continued with the league, even when it became the renegade Southern Ontario Junior A Hockey League in 1970. The Maroons left the league in 1976, became the Maple City Fords and rejoined the current Western Junior "B" league. The Maroons became the MicMacs in 1988, but switched back to their traditional "Maroons" moniker in 1995.

At the 2004 NHL entry draft, Ryan Jones was drafted as a Maroon in the fourth round by the Minnesota Wild, 111th overall. He attended and played for Miami University. After his collegiate career, Minnesota traded Jones to the Nashville Predators.

The Maroons participated in the 2006 Sutherland Cup round robin, but lost out to the Niagara Falls Canucks and the Cambridge Winterhawks with a 1-3 record.

The Maroons began the 2013-14 season slowly and resorted to trading for four of their territorial rival's, the Lambton Shores Predators, top players (Kyle Brothers, Adam Arsenault, Tanner Ferguson, and Connor Annett) in a series of high-profile trades for players and cash. The Maroons also released 2012-13 starting all-star goaltender Darien Ekblad and replaced him with the Cambridge Winter Hawks' goaltender Jacob Keogh while picking up NOJHL Jr. A forward Kyle Rowe. Ekblad would get picked up by the Junior C Essex 73's and tend them to a Great Lakes League championship. Right before the trade deadline, the Maroons picked up forward Charlie Izaguirre from the fizzling Port Colborne Pirates for cash and prospects. On January 28, 2014, the Ontario Hockey Association ruled against the Maroons for exceeding their limit on import players. General Manager Bill Szekesy was suspended for an entire season and the franchise fined $4500. In addition, during the 2014-15 season, the Maroons will be limited to 30 cards instead of the usual 35. On February 19, 2014, the OHA announced that despite a Maroons' appeal, the punishment will stand. In addition, two wins were stripped from their record (versus Leamington Flyers and St. Marys Lincolns). Despite the trades and controversies, the Maroons would sweep the Western Conference quarter-final against the Strathroy Rockets and semi-final against the LaSalle Vipers, before being quashed 4-games-to-1 in the conference final by the Leamington Flyers.

The Maroons have since remained a presence in the ultra competitive Western Conference of the GOJHL. In 2017-18 the Maroons were only able to secure the 6th seed in the playoffs but upset a major rival the Lasalle Vipers in a highly competitive 7 game series in which the Maroons trailed the series 2-0 and 3-2 before prevailing. The Maroons would then battle the 1 seed London Nationals in another highly competitive series. The Maroons took game one in a classic game on a Bryce Yetman double overtime goal. However, the Maroons would not be able to overcome the Nationals high powered offense and suffering defense, and fell in 6 games.

In the off-season the Maroons made many moves to attempt to once again rain supreme over the West acquiring many veterans of various junior leagues highlighted by the acquisition of Nolan Gardiner, a former Ottawa 67, from the Caledonia Corvairs.

In the 2018 - 2019 season, the Maroons placed a competitive 3rd out of the 9 teams in the Western Conference. However, they would fall to the 6th seed Komoka Kings in 5 Games in the first round of the playoffs. The 2019 - 2020 season was cut short due to the onset of the COVID-19 pandemic in March 2020. There was no playoff games played in the 2020 Sutherland Cup, and the entire 2020-2021 season was cancelled.

In the 2021 - 2022 season, the Western Conference remained very competitive with there being only a 7 point difference between the first place Leamington Flyers and the third place Maroons. The Maroons began the Western Conference playoffs on a strong note beating 6th seed Komoka Kings in 5 games. In the second round, they faced frequent rivals, London Nationals without home ice advantage in the series. The Nationals had knocked the Maroons out of the playoffs in 4 of the last eight seasons. After losing a whopping 8-2 in Game 1, the Maroons came back to win 4 in a row and win the series 4-1 in 5 Games. For the first time since 2014, the Maroons appeared in the Western Conference Championship Final against first seed rival Leamington Flyers. After losing Game 1 in Leamington 3-1, the Maroons came back to win 6-1 on home ice in Game 2. Leamington would take Game 3 in overtime, but the Chatham Maroons would come back to win Games 4,5 and 6 to win their first Western Conference Championship in 16 years. The Maroons dedicated their championship to their equipment manager and longtime Maroons staff and volunteer, Randy DeWael who died suddenly following their first round win over Komoka. Chatham faced the Cambridge Redhawks, Champions of the Midwestern Conference and the Golden Horseshoe Conference Champion St Catharines Falcons.

In the 24-25 season the Maroons would feature a league leading offense scoring 246 times in route to a second place conference finish in the newly aligned Western Conference. This finish set a first round playoff matchup with the 7th seeded Elmira Sugar Kings scoring 31 times in a 5 game series victory. This led to a second round matchup with the 3rd seeded Stratford Warriors. The Maroons jump out to a 3-1 series lead but the Warriors fought back to force a Game Seven in Chatham in which the Maroons earned a nail biting 2-1 victory to setup a Western Conference finals matchup with the top seeded St. Marys Lincolns, who themselves survived a Game Seven after leading the London Nationals 3-0 earlier in the series. The much anticipated matchup of the two top regular season teams did not disappoint as the teams battled to another Game Seven. The Maroons earned an epic victory 4-3 to win the Western Conference. The Eastern conference presented a familiar Sutherland Cup final opponent as for the Maroons second straight finals appearance they would meet the St Catharines Falcons. In the highest scoring league finals series in history with a total 56 goals, the Maroons would light the lamp 32 times including a staggering 4 goals in just 3:10 in a series clinching game 6 to lead the Maroons to their 2nd Sutherland Cup Championship

== Season-by-season results ==
Season	GP	W	L	T	OTL	GF	GA	P	Results	Playoffs
1959-60	30	20	7	3	-	184	110	43	2nd BCJBHL	Won League, lost SC SF
1960-61	31	21	10	0	-	189	102	42	2nd BCJBHL	Lost semi-final
1961-62	30	23	7	0	-	179	122	46	1st BCJBHL	
1962-63	35	23	11	1	-	221	114	47	1st BCJBHL	Lost final
1963-64	28	24	4	0	-	179	66	48	1st BCJBHL	Won League, lost SC QF
1964-65	40	31	6	3	-	257	135	65	1st WOJBHL	Lost semi-final
1965-66	40	27	13	0	-	211	174	54	2nd WOJBHL	Lost semi-final
1966-67	40	23	15	2	-	200	173	48	3rd WOJBHL	
1967-68	52	36	12	4	-	289	193	76	2nd WOJBHL	
1968-69	56	26	29	1	-	235	253	53	3rd WOJAHL	Lost semi-final
1969-70	56	43	12	1	-	305	182	87	1st WOJAHL	Won League
1970-71	44	30	9	5	-	254	161	63	1st SOJAHL	Lost semi-final
1971-72	56	33	17	6	-	247	215	72	3rd SOJAHL	Lost semi-final
1972-73	60	33	19	8	-	292	218	74	2nd SOJAHL	Won League, won Buckland Cup
1973-74	62	35	17	10	-	336	230	80	3rd SOJAHL	Lost final
1974-75	60	25	27	8	-	241	246	58	3rd SOJAHL	Lost semi-final
1975-76	60	36	18	6	-	333	229	78	2nd SOJAHL	Lost final
1976-77	40	9	24	7	-	162	236	25	6th WOJHL	
1977-78	39	10	26	3	-	169	224	23	6th WOJHL	
1978-79	42	15	20	7	-	210	226	37	6th WOJHL	
1979-80	42	24	11	7	-	262	163	55	2nd WOJHL	
1980-81	42	26	15	1	-	255	176	53	3rd WOJHL	Lost final
1981-82	42	14	24	4	-	188	244	32	6th WOJHL	
1982-83	42	14	23	5	-	193	222	33	6th WOJHL	
1983-84	48	20	27	1	-	198	223	41	7th WOJHL	
1984-85	48	14	26	8	-	181	232	36	5th WOJHL	
1985-86	42	19	15	8	-	238	209	46	4th WOJHL	Lost final
1986-87	42	15	20	7	-	222	264	37	5th WOJHL	
1987-88	42	33	5	3	1	282	148	70	1st WOJHL	Lost final
1988-89	41	29	9	2	1	290	158	61	2nd WOJHL	Lost final
1989-90	39	33	5	1	0	309	141	67	2nd WOJHL	Won League
1990-91	48	28	17	1	2	246	202	59	4th WOJHL	Won League
1991-92	50	30	15	4	1	248	196	65	2nd WOJHL West	Lost final
1992-93	52	21	24	5	2	-	-	49	3rd WOJHL West	
1993-94	49	28	17	3	1	258	235	60	3rd WOJHL West	
1994-95	52	17	33	0	2	206	288	36	4th WOJHL West	
1995-96	51	6	41	2	2	134	330	16	5th WOJHL West	
1996-97	52	20	23	6	3	223	232	49	4th WOJHL West	
1997-98	52	42	7	1	2	335	163	87	1st WOJHL West	Won League
1998-99	52	36	12	0	4	254	167	76	2nd WOJHL West	Won League, won SC
1999-00	54	47	6	0	1	286	144	95	1st GOHL	Won League
2000-01	54	44	7	1	2	279	155	91	1st GOHL	Won League
2001-02	54	43	9	0	2	307	163	88	1st WOJHL	Lost final
2002-03	48	27	19	0	2	208	166	56	5th WOJHL	
2003-04	48	33	12	0	3	232	150	69	2nd WOJHL	Won League
2004-05	48	40	6	1	1	210	93	82	1st WOJHL	Won League
2005-06	48	32	12	2	2	188	112	68	2nd WOJHL	Won League
2006-07	48	26	20	-	2	225	208	54	5th WOJHL	Lost semi-final
2007-08	48	17	26	-	5	152	202	39	8th GOJHL-W	Lost quarter-final
2008-09	52	26	23	-	3	211	224	55	6th GOJHL-W	Lost quarter-final
2009-10	50	33	15	-	2	199	163	68	3rd GOJHL-W	Lost Conf. SF
2010-11	51	22	23	-	6	213	222	50	8th GOJHL-W	Lost Conf. QF
2011-12	51	19	27	-	5	178	214	43	9th GOJHL-W	DNQ
2012-13	51	34	11	-	6	210	160	74	1st GOJHL-W	Lost Conf. Final, 1-4 (London)
2013-14	49	31	15	-	3	249	176	65	3rd GOJHL-W	Lost Conf. Final, 1-4 (Leamington)
2014-15	49	34	13	-	2	249	163	70	2nd GOJHL-W	Lost Conf Quarter, 2-4 (London)
2015-16	50	32	16	1	1	248	176	66	4th of 9-W; 9th of 26-GOJHL	Won Conf Quarter, 4-1 (St.Thomas); Lost Conf Semifinals 2-4 (Leamington)
2016-17	50	37	12	0	1	251	172	75	2nd of 9-W; 6th of 27-GOJHL	Won Conf Quarter, 4-0 (St.Thomas); Lost Conf Semifinals, 1-4 (London)
2017-18	50	25	22	1	2	202	192	53	6th of 9-W; 14th of 26-GOJHL	Won Conf Quarter, 4-3 (Vipers); Lost Conf Semifinals, 2-4 (London)
2021-22	48	29	12	4	3	202	157	65	5th of 9-W; 9th of 25-GOJHL	Won Conf Quarter, 4-1 (Kings); Won Conf. Semis 4-1 (London); Won Conf Finals 4-2 (Leamington); Round Robin /2-2 (Redhawks}(Falcons} Lost League Finals, 0-2 (Falcons}
2022-23	50	25	21	2	2	191	194	54	3rd of 9-W; 14th of 25-GOJHL	Lost Conf Quarter, 1-4 (Vipers)
2023-24	50	27	20	2	1	195	174	57	5th of 8-W; 13th of 23-GOJHL	Lost Conf Quarter, 2-4 (Vipers)
2024-25	50	35	10	-	5	246	151	75	2nd of 12-W; 2nd of 23-GOJHL	Won Conf. Quarter, 4-1 (Sugar Kings); Won Conf. Semis 4-3 (Warriors); Won Conf. Finals 4-3 (Lincolns); Won Sutherland Cup Finals, 4-2 (Falcons)
2025-26	50	37	8	2	3	243	146	79	1st of 12-West; 4th of 23-GOJHL	Won Conf. Quarter, 4-0 (St.Thomas); Lost Conf. Semis 1-4 (Warriors)

== 2024–2025 executives, coaching and support staff ==
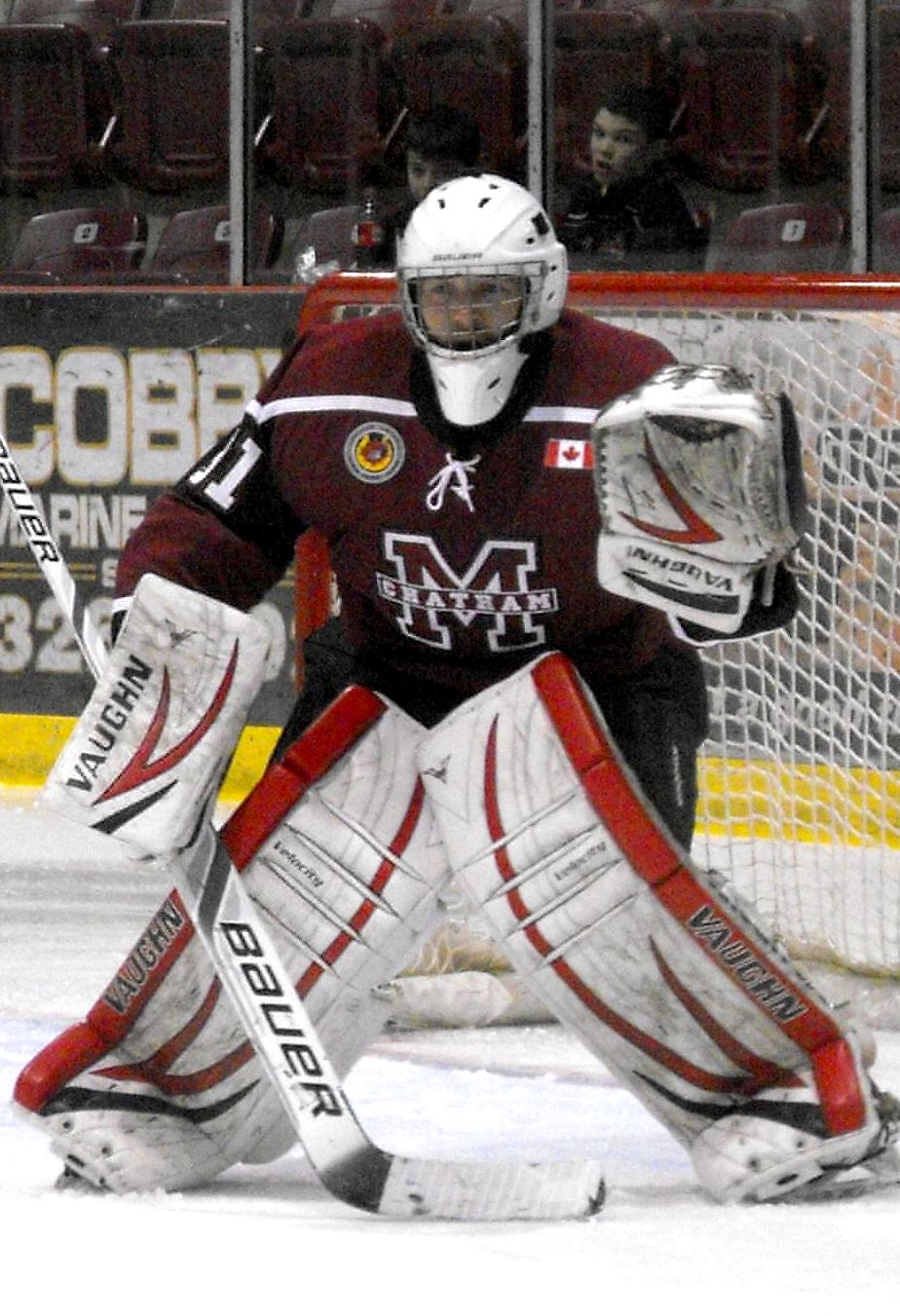
Maroons goalie during the 2024-2025 season in Leamington, Ontario.

- President - Bill Szekesy
- Vice President - Karen Szekesy
- Director of Business Development - Andrew Doran
- Assistant General Manager & Director of Player Development - Shawn Connors
- Head coach & General Manager - Richard Santos
- Assistant coach - Brennan Feasey
- Assistant coach - Shawn Connors
- Goaltending Coach - Bino Pereira
- Head Athletic Trainer- Eric Harvey
- Equipment Manager - Chad Strain
- Equipment Manager - Brayden Jee
- Team Physician - Dr. Anthony Dixon M.D.
- Team Chiropractor - Dr.Jody Anderson D.C.

== Playoffs ==
- 1969 Lost semi-final

St. Thomas Barons defeated Chatham Maroons 4-games-to-2

- 1970 Won League

Chatham Maroons defeated St. Thomas Barons 4-games-to-none
Chatham Maroons defeated Brantford Foresters 5-games-to-2 WOJAHL CHAMPIONS

- 1971 Lost semi-final

Guelph CMC's defeated Chatham Maroons 4-games-to-1 with 1 tie

- 1972 Lost semi-final

Chatham Maroons defeated Windsor Spitfires 4-games-to-1
Detroit Jr. Red Wings defeated Chatham Maroons 4-games-to-3

- 1973 Won League, won OHA Buckland Cup, lost Dudley Hewitt Cup semi-final

Chatham Maroons defeated Welland Sabres 4-games-to-2 with 1 tie
Chatham Maroons defeated Guelph CMC's 4-games-to-3 with 1 tie SOJHL CHAMPIONS
Chatham Maroons defeated Wexford Raiders (OPJHL) 4-games-to-3 BUCKLAND CUP CHAMPIONS
Pembroke Lumber Kings (CJHL) defeated Chatham Maroons 4-games-to-3

- 1974 Lost final

Chatham Maroons defeated Guelph CMC's 4-games-to-none with 1 tie
Chatham Maroons defeated Welland Sabres 4-games-to-2
Windsor Spitfires defeated Chatham Maroons 4-games-to-1

- 1975 Lost semi-final

Chatham Maroons defeated Niagara Falls Flyers 4-games-to-1 with 1 tie
Guelph CMC's defeated Chatham Maroons 3-games-to-2 with 2 ties

- 1976 Lost final

Chatham Maroons defeated Hamilton Mountain A's 4-games-to-3
Guelph Platers defeated Chatham Maroons 4-games-to-none

== Sutherland Cup appearances ==
1999: Chatham Maroons defeated Stratford Cullitons 4-games-to-3
2005: Thorold Blackhawks defeated Chatham Maroons 4-games-to-1
2022: St Catharines Falcons defeated Chatham Maroons 2-games-to-0
2025: Chatham Maroons defeated St Catharines Falcons 4-games-to-2

== Notable alumni ==
- Andy Delmore
- Colton Fretter
- Rick Heinz
- Ken Houston
- Ryan Jones
- Randy MacGregor
- Dennis McCord
- Vern Stenlund
- Peter Sturgeon
- Derek Wilkinson
- Brian Wiseman
- Kevin Westgarth
- Cory Bussing
