= London Nationals =

Canadian junior ice hockey team

- City: London, Ontario
- League: Greater Ontario Hockey League
- Conference: Western Conference
- Founded: 1950
- Home arena: Western Fair District Sports Centre
- Colours: Red, Navy Blue, white, and black
- Owners: Dean and Brenda Pomerleau
- General manager: Ken Beckett
- Head coach: Donny Martin
- Website: https://londonnationals.com/

Franchise history
- 1950–1958: London Lou Ball Juniors
- 1958–1960: London Diamonds
- 1960–1961: London Athletics
- 1961–1965: London Nationals
- 1965–1966: Ingersoll Nationals
- 1966–1967: London Bees
- 1969–1973: London Squires
- 1973–1976: London-Glencoe Squires
- 1976–1991: London Diamonds
- 1991–present: London Nationals

Championships
- Playoff championships: Sutherland Cup Champions: 2013; WOC Champions: 2012, 2013, 2016, 2017, 2018, 2019; WOJHL Champions: 1981,1983,1984,1992; WJBHL Champions: 1964, 1965; Big 10 West Champions: 1952

The London Nationals are a Canadian junior ice hockey team based in London, Ontario, Canada. They play in the Western division of the Greater Ontario Hockey League (GOHL). Donny Martin has been the team's head coach since 2026. The Nationals play their home games at the Western Fair Sports Centre. Established in 1950, the franchise has also used the names Lou Ball Juniors, Diamonds, Athletics, Bees, and Squires. The Nationals won the Sutherland Cup in the 2012–13 season as the league's playoffs champions.

== History ==
=== Early days — 1950 ===
The team's life began in 1950, playing in The Big '10' Western Division out of the Ontario Arena at the Western Fair grounds. They won the Western Division title in 1952 as the London Lou Ball Juniors, after sponsor Lou Ball's clothing store. In 1956 the 'Big 10' was divided, and London became a member of the Western Ontario Junior "B" Hockey League.

Consistent representation of the city of London at the Jr. B level began in 1950 with the London Lou Ball Juniors, playing in The 'Big 10' Western Division out of the Ontario Arena at the Western Fairgrounds. The team was named after Lou Ball Clothes, which were stores owned by coach Lou Ball, and they won the championship the following season. The team was known as the London Collinson Flyers during the 1955–56 season before reverting to Lou Ball Juniors for 2 more seasons. The name changed to London Diamonds in 1958, then to Athletics in 1960. In 1961 the team was renamed again. They were called the Nationals, after sponsor Canadian National Recreation Association, an organization of Canadian National Railways employees.

=== The Maple Leafs — 1963 ===
In 1963 the Toronto Maple Leafs began sponsoring the Nationals. The Maple Leafs traditionally had affiliations with the Toronto Marlboros and St. Michael's Majors, however with the withdrawal of the Majors from the OHA, and the collapse of the Metro Junior A League, the Leafs were left with only one team. They decided to sponsor the junior team in London, which they wanted to play at the new London Gardens and be promoted to the Ontario Hockey Association.

The OHA initially balked at the proposition however, and so the Nationals continued to play in the Junior B league, winning the London Free Press Trophy as league champions in 1964 and 1965. For the 1965–66 season, the team was finally admitted to major junior hockey, and London's Junior B franchise moved to Ingersoll to make room for the Junior A Nationals. The Junior A team was renamed as London Knights in 1968, and the Nationals name disappeared from the London sports landscape.

=== The Bees, Squires and Diamonds — 1966 ===
The Junior B team returned to London under the name Bees for the 1966–1967 season, but then fell dormant for two seasons. The team was revived in 1969 as the Squires, and played under that name until 1976. The team was then known as the Diamonds from 1976–1991, before the Nationals name was revived after a long-lasting sponsorship with a diamond jeweler dissolved.

The team's time under the Diamonds name was successful, as they claimed the Western Ontario Hockey League title in 1981, 1983, and 1984.

=== Nationals Name Returns — 1991 ===
The next change came when Kent Phibbs purchased the team and changed the name back to the London Nationals, and they won the Western Jr. B championship that same year. The team uniforms were once again the blue and white of the Maple Leafs and the team remained at Nichols Arena for a few years.

Mr. Phibbs now moved the team back to the Gardens. In the summer of 1998, the team was sold again, this time to the Doug Tarry Group (London Knights). The team remained playing at the same arena, but the name had changed to the London Ice House. The team colors and logo were changed to eggplant and teal to match the affiliate and the team still played at the London Ice House. The team's most recent championship came in 2019 (4th straight) as Western Conference Champions.

In 2013, the Nationals defeated the Cambridge Winterhawks to win their first-ever Sutherland Cup. The Nationals appeared in back-to-back Sutherland Cups in 2016 & 2017, and again in 2019.

In 2020, the Nationals marked their 70th anniversary as a Jr. B franchise in London.

== Championships ==
Sutherland Cup
GOJHL Champions

- 2012–13 Champions vs. Cambridge Winterhawks

Bill Weir Trophy
GOJHL Western Conference Champions

- 2018–19 Champions vs. Leamington Flyers
- 2017–18 Champions vs. St. Thomas Stars
- 2016–17 Champions vs. Leamington Flyers
- 2015–16 Champions vs. Leamington Flyers
- 2012–13 Champions vs. Chatham Maroons
- 2011–12 Champions vs. Strathroy Rockets

Western Ontario Junior B Champions
Western Ontario Junior Hockey League

- 1991–92 Champions vs. Windsor Bulldogs
- 1983–84 Champions vs. Sarnia Bees
- 1982–83 Champions vs. Sarnia Bees
- 1980–81 Champions vs. Chatham Maroons
- 1974–75 Champions vs. St. Mary's Lincolns

Western Junior B Champions
Western Ontario Junior B Hockey League

- 1964–65 Champions vs. St. Thomas Barons
- 1963–64 Champions vs. St. Thomas Barons
- 1951–52 Champions vs. Sarnia Jr. Sailors

== Season-by-season results ==
Season	GP	W	L	T	OTL	GF	GA	P	Standing	Playoffs
1950–51	14	8	6	0	—	—	—	18	2nd Big '10' Western	
1951–52	16	11	5	0	—	107	68	22	2nd Big '10' Western	Won League
1952–53	18	14	4	0	—	—	—	28	1st Big '10' Western	
1953–54	24	6	18	0	—	119	189	12	4th Big '10' Western	
1954–55	25	5	20	0	—	110	204	10	4th Big '10' Western	
1955–56	27	0	27	0	—	68	249	0	5th Big '10' Western	
1956–57	27	9	18	0	—	126	167	18	5th WJBHL	
1957–58	30	20	10	0	—	—	—	40	2nd WJBHL	
1958–59	36	14	22	0	—	165	224	28	3rd WJBHL	
1959–60	25	1	24	0	—	—	—	2	6th WJBHL	
1960–61	32	0	32	0	—	86	399	0	5th WJBHL	
1961–62	36	10	25	1	—	201	254	21	7th WJBHL	
1962–63	35	3	32	0	—	133	348	6	6th WJBHL	
1963–64	40	28	11	1	—	260	159	57	2nd WJBHL	Won League
1964–65	40	23	17	0	—	213	181	46	3rd WJBHL	Won League
1965–66	40	25	15	0	—	237	178	50	3rd WJBHL	
1966–67	40	5	35	0	—	124	278	10	5th WJBHL	
1967–69	Did not participate									
1969–70	36	16	17	3	—	137	169	35	3rd WOJHL	
1970–71	41	10	29	2	—	139	240	22	4th WOJHL	
1971–72	39	12	18	9	—	173	185	33	5th WOJHL	
1972–73	42	21	15	6	—	224	203	48	2nd WOJHL	
1973–74	40	4	32	4	—	114	239	12	5th WOJHL	
1974–75	40	19	15	6	—	186	172	44	2nd WOJHL	
1975–76	39	11	22	6	—	168	206	28	6th WOJHL	
1976–77	38	13	24	1	—	191	274	27	5th SWJBHL	DNQ
1977–78	40	30	8	2	—	261	171	62	1st SWJBHL	Lost final
1978–79	42	19	18	5	—	227	213	43	5th WOJHL	
1979–80	42	22	12	8	—	182	127	52	5th WOJHL	Lost final
1980–81	42	31	9	2	—	256	147	64	1st WOJHL	Won League
1981–82	42	22	16	4	—	196	180	48	3rd WOJHL	Lost final
1982–83	42	31	7	4	—	263	138	66	1st WOJHL	Won League
1983–84	48	34	7	7	—	297	148	75	1st WOJHL	Won League
1984–85	48	35	13	0	—	285	164	70	1st WOJHL	Lost final
1985–86	42	34	5	3	—	275	150	71	1st WOJHL	
1986–87	42	28	10	4	—	272	162	60	2nd WOJHL	Lost final
1987–88	42	13	24	3	2	190	213	31	7th WOJHL	
1988–89	41	19	16	4	2	197	193	44	5th WOJHL	
1989–90	40	20	18	1	1	205	231	42	4th WOJHL	
1990–91	48	15	30	3	0	170	259	33	8th WOJHL	
1991–92	48	30	13	3	2	274	191	65	1st WOJHL East	Won League
1992–93	52	25	20	5	2	—	—	57	2nd WOJHL East	
1993–94	50	25	21	3	1	273	251	54	2nd WOJHL East	
1994–95	52	16	34	0	2	223	281	34	4th WOJHL East	
1995–96	51	27	17	5	2	208	184	61	3rd WOJHL East	
1996–97	52	23	19	7	3	220	230	56	3rd WOJHL East	
1997–98	52	14	35	0	3	205	307	31	5th WOJHL East	
1998–99	52	19	32	0	1	213	282	39	4th WOJHL East	
1999-00	54	22	27	0	5	189	232	49	8th GOHL	
2000–01	54	39	11	1	3	251	143	82	2nd GOHL	Lost final
2001–02	54	32	21	0	1	251	169	65	6th WOHL	
2002–03	48	31	14	0	3	207	182	65	3rd WOHL	
2003–04	48	27	18	2	1	172	150	57	5th WOHL	Lost final
2004–05	48	22	22	1	3	161	173	48	5th WOHL	
2005–06	48	22	25	1	0	148	165	45	8th WOHL	Lost quarter-final
2006–07	48	21	23	—	4	183	178	46	7th WOHL	Lost quarter-final
2007–08	48	30	14	—	4	214	175	64	3rd GOJHL-W	Lost Conf. Final
2008–09	52	33	10	—	9	221	174	75	2nd GOJHL-W	Lost Conf. Final
2009–10	50	37	10	—	3	244	133	77	1st GOJHL-W	Lost Conf. SF
2010–11	51	34	13	—	4	235	162	72	2nd GOJHL-W	Lost Conf. Final
2011–12	51	28	20	—	3	185	190	59	3rd GOJHL-W	Lost SF Round Robin
2012–13	51	28	17	—	6	196	172	62	4th GOJHL-W	Won League
2013–14	49	29	19	—	1	188	150	59	5th GOJHL-W	Lost Conf. SF
2014–15	49	22	24	—	3	166	166	47	7th GOJHL-W	Lost Conf. SF
2015–16	50	31	14	4	1	212	155	67	2nd of 9-W; 6th of 26-GOJHL	Won Conf. Quarters, 4–1 (Strathroy); Won Conf. Semi-finals 4–2 (Lasalle); Won Conf. Finals 4–2 (Flyers); Won Sutherland Cup Semifinals, 4–2 (Cullitons); Lost Sutherland Cup Finals, 0–4 (Corvairs)
2016–17	50	36	13	1	0	232	131	73	3rd of 9-W; 7th of 27-GOJHL	Won Conf. Quarters 4–1 (Lincolns); Won Conf. Semifinals 4–1 (Maroons); Won Conf. Finals 4–1 (Flyers); Won Sutherland Cup Semis 4–1 (Cyclones); Lost Sutherland Cup Finals 1–4 (Sugar Kings)
2017–18	50	35	12	0	3	217	121	73	1st of 9-W; 6th of 26-GOJHL	Won Conf. Quarters 4–0 (Rockets); Won Conf. Semifinal 4-2 (Maroons); Won Conf. Finals 4-0 (Stars); Lost Sutherland Cup Semis 2-4 (Cyclones)
2018–19	48	33	12	1	3	217	121	73	2nd of 9-W; 4th of 26-GOJHL	Won Conf. Quarters 4–0 (Stars); Won Conf. Semifinal 4-1 (Lasalle); Won Conf. Finals 4-0 (Flyers); Won Sutherland Cup Semis 4–1 (Cyclones); Lost Sutherland Cup Finals 3–4 (Siskins)
2019–1920	50	42	5	1	2	217	121	87	1st of 9-W; 4th2nd of 26-GOJHL	Won Conf. Quarters 4–0 (Legionnaires); Incomplete Conf. Semifinal 1-0 (Lasalle); Playoffs cancelled due to pandemic
2020–2021	Season lost due to pandemic									
2021–22	48	34	11	2	1	187	121	71	2nd of 9-W; 5th of 25-GOJHL	Won Conf. Quarters 4–2 (Stars); Lost Conf. Semifinal 1-4 (Maroons)
2022–23	50	34	11	4	1	228	169	73	2nd of 9-W; 7th of 25-GOJHL	Won Conf. Quarters 4–0 (Stars); Lost Conf. Semifinal 0-4 (Lincolns)
2023–24	50	36	11	1	2	218	136	75	1st of 8-W; 3rd of 23-GOJHL	Won Conf. Quarters 4-1 (Kings); Won Conf Semifinals, 4-1 (Lasalle); Lost Conf. Finals 3-4 (Lincolns)
2024–25	50	30	16	3	1	195	165	64	5th of 12-West Conf; 9th of 23-GOJHL	Won Conf. Quarters 4-0 (Cyclones); Lost Conf Semifinals, 3-4 (Lincolns)
2025–26	50	32	16	1	1	223	169	66	5th of 12-West Conf; 8th of 23-GOJHL	Lost Conf. Quarters 0-4 (Warriors)

=== Playoffs ===
- 1950–51 Lost to Windsor 8–6 (2–3, 6–3)
- 1951–52 Defeated Windsor 3–0 in semi-finals
  Defeated Sarnia 4–0 in finals. BIG '10' WESTERN CHAMPIONS
- 1952–53 Semi-final round robin. London Eliminated.
- 1953–54 Lost to Sarnia 4–0 in semi-finals.
- 1954–55 Lost to Sarnia 3–2 in semi-finals.
- 1955–56 Did not qualify
- 1956–57 Did not qualify
- 1957–58 Defeated Woodstock 3–0 in first round.
  Defeated St. Mary's Lincolns 3–1 in semi-finals.
  Lost to Sarnia Bees 4–1 in final.
- 1958–59 Lost to Sarnia Bees 4–1–1 in semi-finals
- 1959–60 Did not qualify
- 1960–61 Did not qualify
- 1961–62 Did not qualify
- 1962–63 Did not qualify
- 1963–64 Defeated Sarnia Bees 4–2 (7–4, 2–5, 4–2, 5–7, 6–2, 5–3) in semi-finals.
  Defeated St. Thomas Barons 4–2 (7–6, 3–5, 4–2, 5–2, 3–7, 6–1) in finals. WOJHL CHAMPIONS
- 1964–65 Defeated Chatham Maroons 4–1 (4–6, 6–5, 5–3, 5–0, 7–4) in semi-finals.
  Defeated St. Thomas Barons 4–0 (8–4, 6–3, 3–1, 7–5) in finals. WOJHL CHAMPIONS
- 1965–66 Lost to Sarnia Bees 4–1 (4–3, 2–8, 7–2, 3–2, 5–2) in semi-finals.
- 1966–67 Did not qualify
- 1967–68 Did not participate
- 1968–69 Did not participate
- 1970–78 NO RECORDS AVAILABLE
- 1978–79 Defeated Petrolia Jets 7–3 (6-pt series) in first round.
  Lost to Strathroy Blades 8–0 (8-pt series) in second round.
- 1980–80 Defeated Chatham Maroons 3–1 in first round.
  Defeated Strathroy Blades 4–0 in second round.
  Lost to Windsor 4–0 in finals.
- 1980–81 Defeated Windsor 4–0 (London advanced directly to final)
  Defeated Chatham Maroons 4–1 in finals. WOJHL CHAMPIONS
- 1981–82 Defeated Chatham Maroons 3–0 in first round.
  Defeated Petrol Jets 3–0 in second-round.
  Lost to Sarnia 4–3 in finals.
- 1982–83 Defeated St. Thomas Pests 5–2 in first round. (Best 5-of-9; London advanced directly to final)
  Defeated Sarnia Steeplejacks 4–1 in finals. WOJHL CHAMPIONS
- 1983–84 Defeated Windsor 4–0 (London advanced directly to final)
  Defeated Sarnia Steeplejacks 4–0 in finals. WOJHL CHAMPIONS
- 1984–85 Defeated St. Thomas Pests 3–0 (London advanced directly to final)
- 1985–86 Lost to Chatham Maroons 5–4 (Best 5-of-9) in first round.
- 1986–87 Defeated Chatham Maroons 4–0 in first round.
  Second Round (Double Round-Robin): 1st - St. Thomas, 2nd - London, 3rd - Sarnia (eliminated) Final: St. Thomas def. London 4–0
- 1988–89 Did not qualify
- 1989–90 Did not qualify
- 1990–91 Lost to St. Mary's Lincoln's 4–0 in quarter-final.
- 1991–92 Lost to Windsor 4–1 in quarter-final.
- 1992–93 Defeated St. Thomas Stars 4–1 in divisional semi-final.
  Defeated St Mary's Lincolns 4–3 in divisional final.
  Defeated Windsor 4–3 in finals. WOJHL CHAMPIONS
- 1993–94 Defeated St. Thomas Stars 4–1 in divisional semi-final.
  Lost to St Mary's Lincolns 4–0 in divisional final.
- 1994–95 Defeated Aylmer 4–2 in divisional semi-final.
  Lost to St Mary's Lincolns 4–0 in divisional final.
- 1995–96 Lost to St. Thomas Stars 4–0 in divisional semi-finals.
- 1996–97 Lost to St. Thomas Stars 4–0 in divisional semi-finals.
- 1997–98 Lost to St. Thomas Stars 4–1 in divisional semi-finals.
- 1998–99 Did not qualify.
- 1999–00 Lost to St. Thomas Stars 4–0 in divisional semi-finals.
- 2000–01 Did not qualify.
- 2001–02 Defeated Strathroy Rockets 4–2 in first round.
  Defeated Sarnia Blast 4–2 in semi-finals.
  Lost to Chatham 4–2 in finals.
- 2002–03 Lost to Sarnia Blast 4–1 in quarter-finals
- 2003–04 Defeated St. Thomas Stars 4–1 in quarter-finals
  Lost to Sarnia Blast 4–3 in semi-finals.
- 2004–05 Defeated Leamington Flyers 4–2 in first round.
  Defeated Sarnia Blast 4–0 in semi-finals.
  Lost to Chatham 4–2 in finals.
- 2005–06 Defeated St. Mary's Lincolns 4–1 in first round.
  Lost to Chatham Maroons 4–0 in semi-finals.
- 2006–07 Lost to St. Mary's Lincolns 4–3 in quarter-finals.
- 2007–08 Lost to Sarnia Legionairres 4–3 in quarter-finals.
- 2008–09 Defeated Leamington Flyers 4–2 in first round.
  Defeated St. Mary's Lincolns 4–0 in semi-finals.
  Lost to Tecumseh Chiefs 4–1 in final.
- 2009–10 Defeated LaSalle Vipers 4–1 in first round.
  Defeated St. Mary's Lincolns 4–3 in semi-finals.
  Lost to Sarnia Legionaries 4–2 in final.
- 2010–11 Defeated Leamington Flyers 4–0 in first round.
  Lost to St. Thomas Stars 4–2 in semi-finals.
- 2011–12 Defeated Sarnia Legionaries 4–0 in first round.
  Defeated LaSalle Vipers 4–2 in semi-finals.
  Lost to St. Thomas Stars 4–3 in final.
- 2012–13 Defeated LaSalle Vipers 4–1 in first round.
  Defeated St. Mary's Lincolns 4–2 in semi-finals.
  Defeated Strathroy Rockets 4–2 WESTERN CONFERENCE CHAMPIONS
  Defeated Cambridge Winterhawks 4–3 in the championship round. SUTHERLAND CUP CHAMPIONS
- 2013–14 Defeated St. Thomas Stars 4–2 in first round.
  Lost to Leamington Flyers 4–1 in semi-finals.
- 2014–15 Defeated Sarnia Legionnaries 4–3 in first round.
  Lost to Leamington Flyers 4–1 in semi-finals.
- 2015–16 Defeated Strathroy Rockets 4–2 in first round.
  Defeated LaSalle Vipers 4–2 in semi-finals.
  Defeated Leamington Flyers 4-2 WESTERN CONFERENCE CHAMPIONS
  Defeated Stratford Cullitons 4–2
  Lost to Caledonia Corvairs 4–0 in final.
- 2016–17 Defeated St. Mary's Lincolns 4–1 in first round.
  Defeated Chatham Maroons 4–1 in semi-finals.
  Defeated Leamington Flyers 4–1 WESTERN CONFERENCE CHAMPIONS
  Defeated Listowel Cyclones 4–1
  Lost to Elmira Sugar Kings 4–1 in Final.
- 2017–18 Defeated Strathroy Rockets 4–0 in first round.
  Defeated Chatham Maroons 4–2 in semi-finals.
  Defeated St. Thomas Stars 4–0 WESTERN CONFERENCE CHAMPIONS
  Lost to Listowel Cyclones 4–1 in semi-finals
- 2018–19 Defeated St. Thomas Stars 4–0 in first round.
  Defeated LaSalle Vipers 4–1 in semi-finals.
  Defeated Leamington Flyers 4–0 WESTERN CONFERENCE CHAMPIONS
  Defeated Listowel Cyclones 4–1 in semi-finals
  Lost to Waterloo Siskins 4–3 in Final.
- 2019–20 Defeated Sarnia Legionnaries 4–0 in first round.
  Playoffs cancelled due to COVID-19 Pandemic

== Sutherland Cup appearances ==
2013: London Nationals defeated Cambridge Winterhawks 4-games-to-3
2016: Caledonia Corvairs defeated London Nationals 4-games-to-none
2017: Elmira Sugar Kings defeated London Nationals 4-games-to-1
2019: Waterloo Siskins defeated London Nationals 4-games-to-3

== Players ==
=== Retired numbers ===
- 16 – Tom Cardiff
- 22 – Patrick Dobie
- 29 – Taylor Edwards
- 39 – Scott Lombardi
- 61 – Max Vinogradov
- 96 – Aaron Dartch

=== NHL alumni ===
List of alumni who also played in the National Hockey League.

London Nationals Junior B

- Mike Corrigan
- Gerry Desjardins
- Darryl Edestrand
- Logan Mailloux
- Brandon Prust
- Mike Van Ryn

London Diamonds Junior B

- Bill Armstrong
- Neal Coulter
- Jeff Hackett
- Ken Hammond
- Dave Hutchison
- Walt McKechnie
- Dan Quinn
- Craig Simpson
- Scott Thornton

== Awards ==
=== GOJHL Western Conference ===
Stan Moore Award
First Place - Western Conference

- 2017-18
- 2019-20

GOJHL Scoring Champion

- 2019-20 - Cal Davis

Kelly Hearn Award
Volunteer of the Year

- 1992–93 – Bill McCullough
- 2006–07 – Bill Westgate
- 2012–13 – Steve Davidson
- 2013–14 – Bruce Keck

Chester Pegg Memorial Award
Sportsmanship & Ability

- 1991–92 – Bill Weir
- 1995–96 – Craig Watson
- 2000–01 – Matt Meyer
- 2009–10 – Adam McKee
- 2010–11 – Noah Schwartz
- 2012–13 – Noah Schwartz
- 2018–19 – Cal Davis

Roy Bruhlman Memorial Award
Rookie of the Year

- 1989–90 – Keli Corpse
- 1990–91 – Trevor Gallant
- 1997–98 – Scott Dickier
- 2000–01 – Kyle Piwowarczyk
- 2019–20 – Logan Mailloux

Phibbs Incorporated Award
Most Valuable 1st Year Defenseman

- 1991–92 – Dan Brown
- 1992–93 – Chad Palmer
- 1993–94 – Chad Palmer
- 1994–95 – John Barrett
- 1996–97 – Mike Van Ryn
- 2003–04 – Patrick Dobie
- 2008–09 – Jake McClelland
- 2013–14 – Matt Fuller
- 2014–15 – Justin Murray
- 2015-16 - Jordan DiCicco
- 2019–20 – Logan Mailloux

Uni-Fab Award
Top Defenceman

- 2016-17 - Quinn Lenihan
- 2017-18 - Jordan DiCicco

Kevin McIntosh Award
Defensive Forward

- 2017-18 - Kyle Dawson

CHOK Award
Most Valuable Player

- 1992–93 – Chris Legg
- 1993–94 – Shane Johnson
- 2000–01 – Ash Goldie
- 2008–09 – Adam McKee
- 2018–19 – Cal Davis
- 2019–20 – Cal Davis

Hugh McLean Award
Regular Season Scoring Champion

- 1982–83 – Craig Simpson
- 1988–89 – Bill Weir
- 1991–92 – Bill Weir
- 1992–93 – Mike Legg
- 1993–94 – Shane Johnson
- 2007–08 – Glenn McCarron
- 2009–10 – Adam McKee
- 2016–17 – Brenden Trottier
- 2018–19 – Cal Davis
- 2019–20 – Cal Davis

Pat & Jackie Stapleton Award
Playoff Scoring Champion

- 2000–01 – Ashe Goldie

Sharon Williamson Award
Playoff MVP

- 2012–13 – Noah Schwartz

Southland Insurance Award
Top Points - Rookie

- 2019–20 – Logan Mailloux

Smith-Buys Award
Rookie Scoring Champion

- 2000–01 – Kyle Piwowarczyk

Roy Caley Award
Best Team Goals Against Average

- 1979–80 –
- 1980–81 –
- 1982–83 – D. Sceli, Craig Billington
- 1983–84 – Richard McCullough, Rob Nixon
- 1984–85 –
- 1985–86 –
- 1986–87 – Joe Noval, Brian Morris
- 1991–92 – Shawn O'Hagan, Dave Grasso
- 1995–96 – Steve Tutt, Ian Burt
- 2009–10 – Mike Coulter, Taylor Edwards
- 2016–17 – Cameron Zanussi, Trenten McGrail
- 2017–18 – David Ovsjannikov, Zach Springer
- 2019–20 – Shawn Wiranata

=== Team records ===
Team records for a single season
Statistic	Player	Total	Season
Most Goals	Craig Simpson	47	1982–83
Most Assists	Adam McKee	65	2009–10
Most Points	Craig Simpson	111	1982–83
Most Game-Winning Goals	Shuan Furlong	9	2009–10
Most Powerplay Goals	Chris McKay	17	2009–10
Most Shorthanded Goals	Graham Spriel	5	2005–06

Individual player records for a career
Statistic	Player	Total	Career
Most Goals	Aaron Dartch	112	2008–13
Most Assists	Adam McKee	115	2007–10
Most Points	Aaron Dartch	251	2008–13
Most Games Played	Max Vinogradov	234*	2015–20
Most Game-Winning Goals	Noah Schwartz	18	2010–13
Most Powerplay Goals	Aaron Dartch	39	2008–13
Most Shorthanded Goals	Craig Watson	6	1996–97

- As of January 19, 2020

== Arenas ==
=== Ontario Arena, 1950–1963 ===
- Built :
- Capacity : .
- Ice Size : 190' x 85'

Original home of the London Nationals. Built on the property of the Western Fair.

=== London Gardens/London Ice House, 1976–2001 ===
- Built : 1963
- Capacity : 5,075 including standing room.
- Ice Size : 190' x 85'

The London Gardens (see article) was built in 1963 and served as the home of the Nationals from 1963 to its closing in 2001. The building was renamed London Ice House in 1994. The arena is currently home to the Forest City Velodrome.

=== Ray Lanctin Arena (Medway Arena), 2002–2005 ===
- Built : 1967
- Capacity : N/A.
- Ice Size : 100' x 200'

Medway Arena was renovated in 2009 after being built in 1967. Renovations include updates to the community centre, flooring and rink boards. Winter skating programs and events run throughout the winter season, and arena pad is available for lacrosse during the summer season. This facility is also equipped with a hall and kitchenette, perfect for private rentals..

=== Western Fair Sports Centre, 2006–present ===
- Built : 1995
- Capacity : 1,500 including standing room.
- Ice Size : 100' x 200'

The Sports Centre at Western Fair District is a state-of-the-art 160,000 square foot multi-use facility known as a leader amongst the many ice facilities available in London and Ontario.

=== Other arenas ===
- Lambeth Arena
- Earl Nicols Arena
- Ray Lanctin Arena
- Glencoe Arena

== Uniforms and logos ==
The original London Nationals were modelled after their parent club, the Toronto Maple Leafs, up until the affiliation changed to the London Knights. The team’s logo was the same maple leaf used by the parent club at the time, except with “London Nationals” written across the leaf instead of “Toronto Maple Leafs.” Over the years, the team went through numerous logo and uniform changes, with sponsors including Chester Pegg & Phibbs Incorporated influencing the look. In the 1990s, the Nationals adopted the Knights’ eggplant and teal colours to mirror their Jr. A affiliate. When the Knights moved to their modern green, black, and gold look in 2002, the Nationals returned to a familiar blue-and-white design.

In 2015, the Nationals introduced a black alternate jersey featuring the team’s crest logo.

In 2025, the Nationals replaced their long-standing Maple Leafs-style crest with a new train logo.

=== Mascot ===
The Nationals' mascot is now known as "Lou", a tribute to the Lou Ball Juniors, a Jr. B team which played out of the Ontario Arena at the Western Fairgrounds beginning in 1950. The winning name was submitted in a "Name The Mascot" contest. Lou made his first appearance in 2012.
