= Neal Coulter =

Canadian ice hockey player (born 1963)

- Born: January 2, 1963 (age 63) Toronto, Ontario, Canada
- Height: 6 ft 2 in (188 cm)
- Weight: 190 lb (86 kg; 13 st 8 lb)
- Position: Right wing
- Shot: Right
- Played for: New York Islanders
- NHL draft: 63rd overall, 1981; New York Islanders
- Playing career: 1983–1988

Neal M. Coulter (born January 2, 1963) is a Canadian retired ice hockey right winger. He played 26 games in the National Hockey League for the New York Islanders between 1985 and 1988. The rest of his career, which lasted from 1983 to 1988, was spent in various minor leagues.

Coulter was born in Toronto, Ontario. As a youth, he played in the 1976 Quebec International Pee-Wee Hockey Tournament with a minor ice hockey team from London, Ontario.

== Career statistics ==
=== Regular season and playoffs ===
			Regular season					Playoffs
Season	Team	League	GP	G	A	Pts	PIM	GP	G	A	Pts	PIM
1979–80	Oak Ridge Rynes	Mid	60	35	30	65	150	—	—	—	—	—
1980–81	London Diamonds	WOHL	17	13	7	20	38	—	—	—	—	—
1980–81	Toronto Marlboros	OHL	19	4	3	7	22	5	0	3	3	0
1981–82	Toronto Marlboros	OHL	62	14	16	30	79	—	—	—	—	—
1982–83	Toronto Marlboros	OHL	59	13	37	50	60	4	2	1	3	2
1982–83	Indianapolis Checkers	CHL	3	0	1	1	0	1	0	1	1	0
1983–84	Indianapolis Checkers	CHL	58	7	10	17	25	4	2	0	2	0
1983–84	Toledo Goaldiggers	IHL	5	1	3	4	0	—	—	—	—	—
1984–85	Springfield Indians	AHL	2	1	0	1	0	—	—	—	—	—
1984–85	Indianapolis Checkers	IHL	82	31	26	57	95	7	3	1	4	9
1985–86	Springfield Indians	AHL	60	17	9	26	92	—	—	—	—	—
1985–86	New York Islanders	NHL	16	3	4	7	4	—	—	—	—	—
1986–87	Springfield Indians	AHL	47	12	13	25	63	—	—	—	—	—
1986–87	New York Islanders	NHL	9	2	1	3	7	—	—	—	—	—
1987–88	Springfield Indians	AHL	27	11	4	15	33	—	—	—	—	—
1987–88	New York Islanders	NHL	1	0	0	0	0	—	—	—	—	—
AHL totals			136	41	26	67	188	—	—	—	—	—
NHL totals			26	5	5	10	11	—	—	—	—	—
