= Stratford Warriors =

- City: Stratford, Ontario, Canada
- League: Greater Ontario Hockey League
- Division: Mid-Western
- Founded: 1962
- Home arena: William Allman Memorial Arena
- Colours: Red, Navy, and White
- General manager: Nick Parr
- Head coach: David Williams
- Affiliates: Tavistock Braves (PJHL)

Franchise history
- 1962-1967: Stratford Braves
- 1967-1968: Stratford Burtols
- 1968-1975: Stratford Warriors
- 1975-2016: Stratford Cullitons
- 2016-Present: Stratford Warriors

The Stratford Warriors are a junior ice hockey team based in Stratford, Ontario, Canada. They play in the Western division of the Greater Ontario Hockey League. The team was originally named the Warriors but was changed to Cullitons in 1975 in honor of the team sponsor the Culliton brothers. When the sponsorship from the Culliton brothers ended in 2016, the team reverted to its original name, bringing the name "Warriors" back to the city.

== History ==
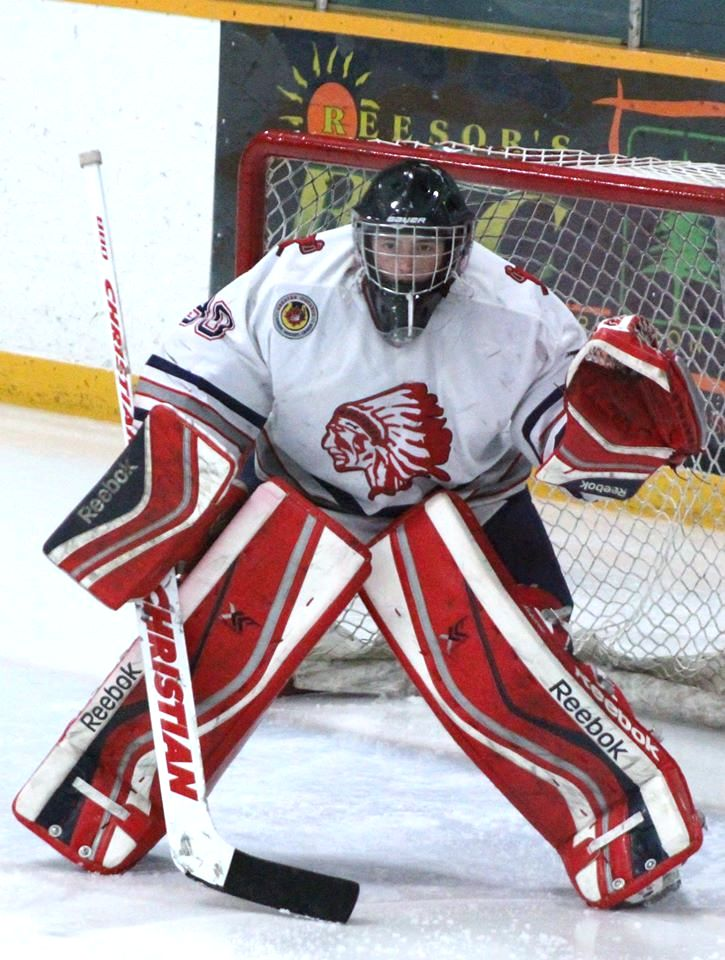
Cullitons goalie during 2014-15 season.

Between the years of 1951 and 1962, not much is known about junior hockey in the town of Stratford-St. Marys District. Prior to 1952, the Stratford Midgets, who became the Kroehlers and Kist Canadians won a Sutherland Cup in the 1940s and competed as Junior A team for the J. Ross Robertson Cup. Stratford played in the Central "B" from 1962 until 1969. When they joined the reformed Western "B" in 1969, they became the Warriors and stayed on board until 1975. In 1975, the team jumped to the precursor to the Mid-Western "B", the "Waterloo-Wellington Junior "B" Hockey League" and changed their name to the Cullitons, finishing first both seasons. They continued their dominance when the league was renamed the Mid-Western, winning eight of the first 13 championships they competed for. They have since won five more league championships. If the Stratford Canadians era is included, the Stratford Junior "B" club has captured eight Sutherland Cup titles, leading the Mid-Western "B" with six since its founding in 1977. The Cullitons have never failed to make the playoffs since joining the Mid-Western "B", a feat matched only by the Waterloo Siskins. Between 1975-76 and 2004–05, the Cullitons never placed lower than third in the league standings.

One thing that sets the Cullitons apart from any other teams in the league, including the Siskins, is that until 2006 the Cullitons have only suffered one losing season. In fact, in their 32-year history the Cullitons have lost more than 10 games only eight times. On three occasions they registered more ties than losses. They have scored more than 300 goals in a season 11 times, and have only allowed more than 200 goals once. The Cullitons have also been regular-season champions 19 times.

== Season-by-season record ==
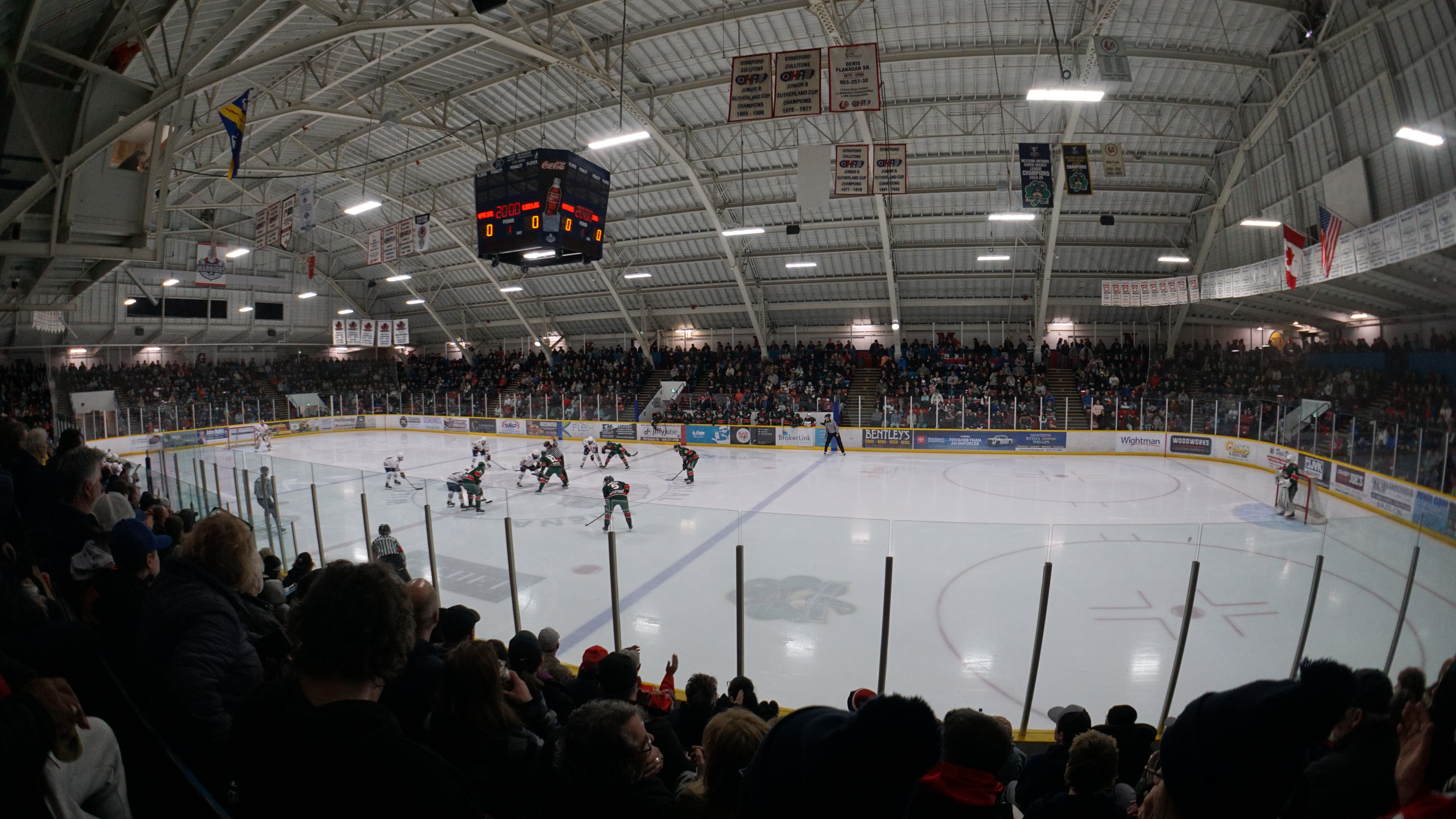
Stratford Warriors playoff game

| Season | GP | W | L | T | OTL | GF | GA | P | Results | Playoffs |
|---|---|---|---|---|---|---|---|---|---|---|
| 1962-63 | 36 | 18 | 17 | 1 | - | 168 | 177 | 37 | 3rd CJBHL | |
| 1963-64 | 36 | 25 | 11 | 0 | - | 241 | 178 | 50 | 1st CJBHL | |
| 1964-65 | 42 | 18 | 20 | 4 | - | 184 | 147 | 40 | 4th CJBHL | |
| 1965-66 | 40 | 22 | 18 | 0 | - | 210 | 184 | 44 | 3rd CJBHL | |
| 1966-67 | 32 | 11 | 18 | 3 | - | 130 | 140 | 25 | 4th CJBHL | |
| 1967-68 | 40 | 17 | 21 | 2 | - | 163 | 194 | 36 | 5th CJBHL | |
| 1968-69 | 36 | 17 | 13 | 6 | - | 188 | 184 | 40 | 3rd CJBHL | |
| 1969-70 | 36 | 24 | 7 | 5 | - | 227 | 162 | 53 | 1st WOJHL | Won League |
| 1970-71 | 42 | 30 | 8 | 4 | - | 302 | 174 | 64 | 2nd WOJHL | Won League |
| 1971-72 | 40 | 19 | 16 | 5 | - | 214 | 212 | 43 | 4th WOJHL | |
| 1972-73 | 42 | 17 | 20 | 5 | - | 241 | 236 | 39 | 6th WOJHL | |
| 1973-74 | 39 | 21 | 17 | 1 | - | 211 | 199 | 43 | 3rd WOJHL | |
| 1974-75 | 40 | 11 | 24 | 5 | - | 181 | 226 | 27 | 6th WOJHL | |
| 1975-76 | 42 | 37 | 5 | 0 | - | 349 | 176 | 74 | 1st WWJBHL | Lost final |
| 1976-77 | 40 | 34 | 3 | 3 | - | 278 | 162 | 71 | 1st WWJBHL | Won League, won SC |
| 1977-78 | 40 | 34 | 2 | 4 | - | 277 | 127 | 72 | 1st MWJBHL | Won League, won SC |
| 1978-79 | 42 | 33 | 4 | 5 | - | 321 | 141 | 71 | 1st MWJBHL | Won League |
| 1979-80 | 42 | 31 | 6 | 5 | - | 251 | 149 | 67 | 1st MWJBHL | Lost final |
| 1980-81 | 42 | 31 | 10 | 1 | - | 240 | 118 | 63 | 1st MWJBHL | Won League |
| 1981-82 | 42 | 35 | 7 | 0 | - | 272 | 140 | 70 | 1st MWJBHL | Won League |
| 1982-83 | 42 | 27 | 13 | 2 | - | 293 | 179 | 56 | 2nd MWJBHL | Won League |
| 1983-84 | 42 | 35 | 6 | 1 | - | 284 | 126 | 71 | 2nd MWJBHL | Lost final |
| 1984-85 | 42 | 25 | 15 | 2 | - | 280 | 185 | 52 | 2nd MWJBHL | Lost final |
| 1985-86 | 40 | 36 | 3 | 1 | - | 333 | 134 | 73 | 1st MWJBHL | Won League, won SC |
| 1986-87 | 42 | 35 | 7 | 0 | - | 345 | 131 | 70 | 1st MWJBHL | Won League |
| 1987-88 | 48 | 35 | 11 | 2 | - | 332 | 172 | 72 | 3rd MWJBHL | Lost semi-final |
| 1988-89 | 48 | 43 | 4 | 1 | - | 398 | 161 | 87 | 1st MWJBHL | Lost final |
| 1989-90 | 48 | 41 | 7 | 0 | - | 396 | 197 | 82 | 1st MWJBHL | Won League, won SC |
| 1990-91 | 48 | 41 | 7 | 0 | - | 367 | 148 | 82 | 1st MWJBHL | Lost final |
| 1991-92 | 48 | 32 | 10 | 6 | - | 299 | 171 | 70 | 3rd MWJBHL | Lost final |
| 1992-93 | 48 | 32 | 15 | 1 | - | 279 | 206 | 65 | 3rd MWJBHL | Lost final |
| 1993-94 | 48 | 39 | 8 | 1 | - | 278 | 127 | 79 | 1st MWJBHL | Lost semi-final |
| 1994-95 | 48 | 41 | 6 | 1 | - | 338 | 125 | 83 | 1st MWJBHL | Won League, won SC |
| 1995-96 | 48 | 38 | 10 | 0 | - | 294 | 140 | 76 | 1st MWJBHL | Won League |
| 1996-97 | 48 | 34 | 8 | 6 | - | 348 | 183 | 74 | 1st MWJBHL | Lost final |
| 1997-98 | 48 | 38 | 9 | 1 | - | 315 | 147 | 77 | 1st MWJBHL | Lost final |
| 1998-99 | 48 | 43 | 5 | 0 | - | 347 | 123 | 86 | 1st MWJBHL | Won League |
| 1999-00 | 48 | 33 | 10 | 5 | - | 231 | 139 | 71 | 1st MWJBHL | Lost semi-final |
| 2000-01 | 48 | 31 | 14 | 3 | - | 263 | 167 | 65 | 2nd MWJBHL | Lost semi-final |
| 2001-02 | 48 | 33 | 7 | 8 | - | 270 | 124 | 74 | 2nd MWJBHL | Lost final |
| 2002-03 | 48 | 38 | 6 | 4 | 2 | 262 | 115 | 82 | 1st MWJBHL | Won League, won SC |
| 2003-04 | 48 | 42 | 4 | 1 | 1 | 294 | 133 | 88 | 1st MWJBHL | Won League, won SC |
| 2004-05 | 48 | 31 | 13 | 3 | 1 | 227 | 133 | 66 | 2nd MWJBHL | Lost quarter-final |
| 2005-06 | 48 | 24 | 22 | 2 | - | 176 | 175 | 50 | 5th MWJBHL | Lost quarter-final |
| 2006-07 | 48 | 19 | 24 | 4 | 1 | 158 | 180 | 43 | 7th MWJBHL | Lost quarter-final |
| 2007-08 | 48 | 22 | 16 | 7 | 3 | 167 | 158 | 54 | 4th GOJHL-MW | |
| 2008-09 | 52 | 28 | 22 | - | 2 | 211 | 177 | 58 | 5th GOJHL-MW | |
| 2009-10 | 51 | 23 | 27 | - | 1 | 183 | 178 | 47 | 5th GOJHL-MW | Lost Conf. Final |
| 2010-11 | 51 | 33 | 16 | - | 2 | 217 | 150 | 68 | 4th GOJHL-MW | Lost Conf. QF |
| 2011-12 | 51 | 41 | 9 | - | 1 | 266 | 139 | 83 | 2nd GOJHL-MW | Lost Conf. Final |
| 2012-13 | 51 | 27 | 18 | - | 6 | 193 | 169 | 60 | 5th GOJHL-MW | Lost Conf. Final |
| 2013-14 | 49 | 28 | 18 | - | 3 | 171 | 140 | 59 | 4th GOJHL-MW | Lost Conf. Final |
| 2014-15 | 49 | 32 | 13 | - | 4 | 212 | 140 | 68 | 3rd GOJHL-MW | Won Conf. Quarter-finals, 4-1 (Winter Hawks); Won Conf. Semi-finals, (Dutchmen); Lost Conf. Finals, 1-4 (Sugar Kings) |
| 2015-16 | 50 | 33 | 10 | 4 | 3 | 223 | 159 | 73 | 2nd of 9-MW; 4th of 26-GOJHL | Won Conf. Quarter-finals, 4-0 (Bombers); Won Conf. Semi-finals, 4-2 (Sugar Kings); Won Conf. Finals, 4-1 (Siskins); Lost semifinals, 2-4 (Nationals) |
Warriors
| 2016-17 | 50 | 24 | 23 | 0 | 3 | 200 | 194 | 51 | 6th of 9-MW; 14th of 27-GOJHL | Lost Conf. Quarter-finals, 1-4 (Dutchmen) |
| 2017-18 | 50 | 37 | 11 | 1 | 1 | 241 | 146 | 76 | 2nd of 9-MW; 5th of 27-GOJHL | Won Conf. Quarter-finals, 4-0 (99ers); Lost Conf Semifinals 2-4 (Sugar Kings) |
| 2018-19 | 47 | 32 | 11 | 1 | 3 | 165 | 117 | 68 | 2nd of 8-MW; 6th of 25-GOJHL | Won Conf. Quarter-finals, 4-1 (99ers); Lost Conf Semifinals 2-4 (Siskins) |
| 2019-20 | 50 | 31 | 16 | 1 | 2 | 185 | 119 | 65 | 4th of 8-MW; 9th of 26-GOJHL | Won Conf. Quarter-finals, 4-1 (Cyclones); Incomplete Conf Semifinals 1-3 (Sugar Kings) remaining playoffs cancelled due to pandemic |
| 2020-21 | Season cancelled due to pandemic | | | | | | | | | |
| 2021-22 | 48 | 29 | 17 | 1 | 1 | 175 | 131 | 60 | 4th of 8-MW; 10th of 25-GOJHL | Won Conf. Quarter-finals, 4-0 (Centennials); Lost Conf Semifinals 2-4 (Sugar Kings) |
| 2022-23 | 50 | 38 | 11 | 1 | 0 | 256 | 126 | 77 | 2nd of 8-MW; 4th of 25-GOJHL | Won Conf. Quarter-finals, 4-0 (Bombers); Won Conf Semifinals 4-0 (redhawks); Won Conf. Finals, 4-2 (Siskins); Round Robin 3-1 (Hamilton)(Leamington); Lost League Finals 3-4 (Leamington) |
| 2024-25 | 50 | 33 | 14 | 3 | 0 | 171 | 107 | 69 | 3rd of 12 West Conf; 6th of 23-GOJHL | Won Conf. Quarter-finals, 4-0 (Vipers); Lost Conf Semifinals, 3-4 (Maroons) |
| 2025-26 | 50 | 30 | 13 | 4 | 3 | 183 | 133 | 67 | 4th of 12 West Conf; 7th of 23-GOJHL | Won Conf. Quarter-finals, 4-3 (Nationals); Won Conf Semifinals, 4-1 (Maroons); Lost Conf. Finals 3-4 (Lincolns) |

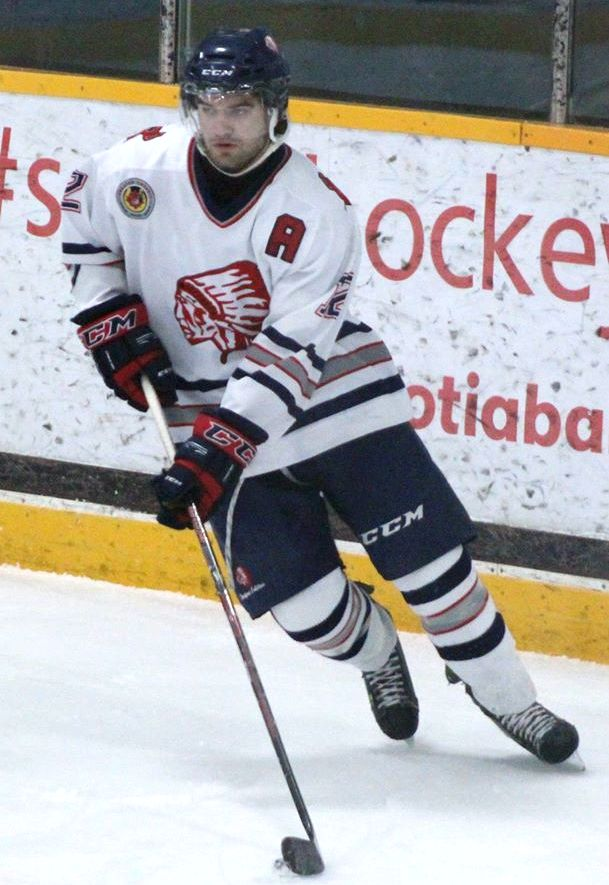
Cullitons player during 2014-15 season.

- 1974-1975
- 1975-1977
- 1977-2002
- 2002–Present

== Sutherland Cup appearances ==
1977: Stratford Cullitons defeated Streetsville Derbys 4-games-to-2
1978: Stratford Cullitons defeated Streetsville Derbys 9-points-to-5
1981: Burlington Cougars defeated Stratford Cullitons 8-points-to-4
1983: Henry Carr Crusaders defeated Stratford Cullitons 4-games-to-none
1986: Stratford Cullitons defeated Streetsville Derbys 4-games-to-none
1990: Stratford Cullitons defeated St. Catharines Falcons 4-games-to-none
1995: Stratford Cullitons defeated St. Thomas Stars 4-games-to-none
1999: Chatham Maroons defeated Stratford Cullitons 4-games-to-3
2003: Stratford Cullitons defeated Thorold Blackhawks 4-games-to-3
2004: Stratford Cullitons defeated Thorold Blackhawks 4-games-to-none
2023: Leamington Flyers defeated Stratford Cullitons 4-games-to-3

== Notable alumni ==
- Mark Bell
- Rob Blake
- Boyd Devereaux
- Greg de Vries
- Nelson Emerson
- Dave Farrish
- Jeff Halpern
- Rem Murray
- Ed Olczyk
- Mike Peluso
- Chris Pronger
- David Shaw
- Bryan Smolinski
- Garth Snow
- Tim Taylor
- Mike Watt
- Zac Dalpe

== More sources ==
- OHA Webpage Sutherland Cup History provided by OHA via Official 2006-07 Handbook
- Official Game Puck Basic Team Name History
