= St. Marys Lincolns =

Junior ice hockey team in Ontario, Canada

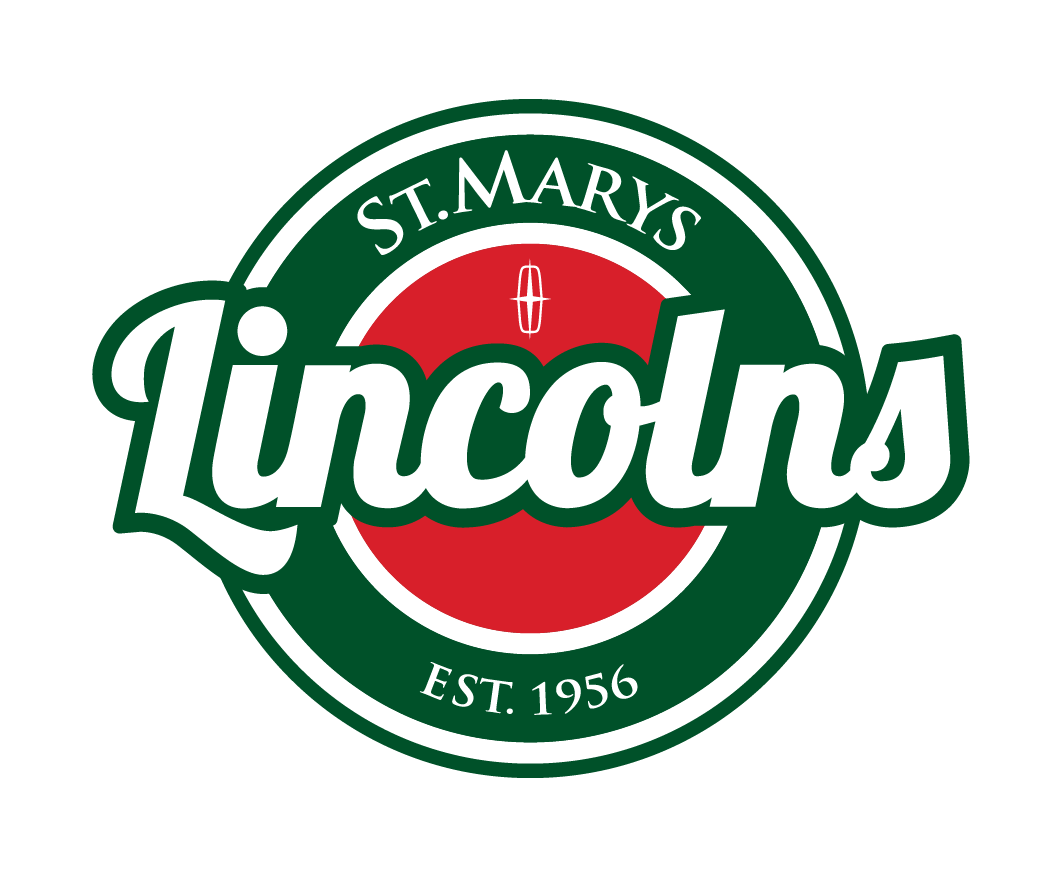
- City: St. Marys, Ontario, Canada
- League: Greater Ontario Hockey League
- Conference: Western Ontario Conference
- Founded: 1956
- Home arena: Pyramid Recreation Complex
- Colours: Green, Red, and White
- General manager: Patrick Powers
- Head coach: Jeff Bradley
- Website: lincs.ca

Franchise history
- 1956–Present: St. Marys Lincolns

Championships
- Conference titles: 2024, 2026
- Playoff championships: Sutherland Cup Champions: 1963, 1976

The St. Marys Lincolns are a junior ice hockey team based in St. Marys, Ontario, Canada. They play in the Western division of the Greater Ontario Hockey League.

== History ==
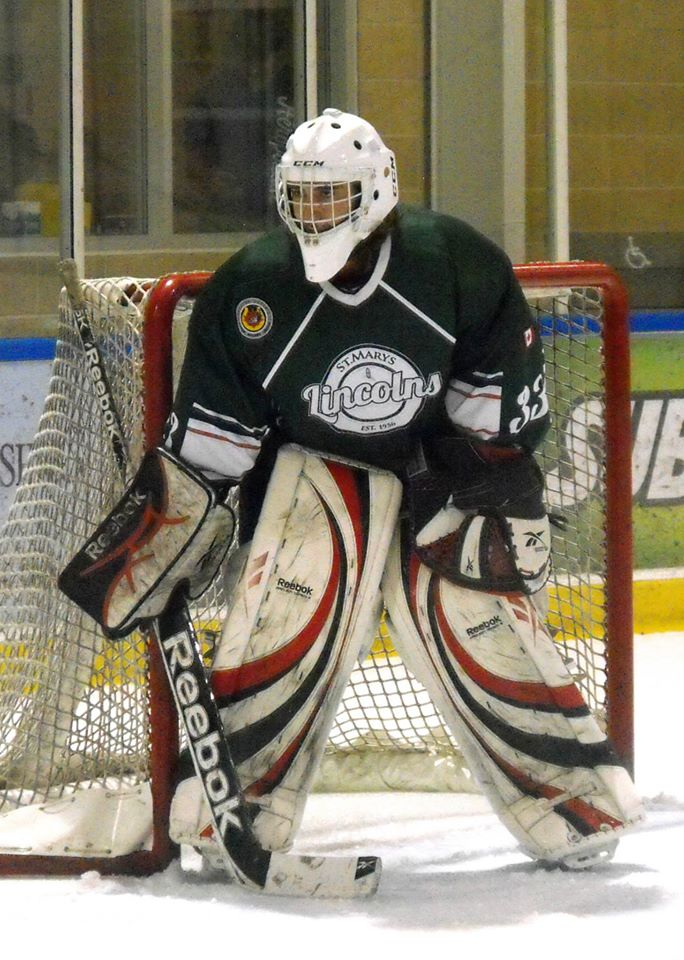
Lincolns goalie in 2014.

Founded in 1956, the Lincolns have never missed a season. The team survived a rather revolutionary era in Ontario hockey. In 1964, they walked away from the old Western Ontario Junior B Hockey League and joined the Central Junior B Hockey League to avoid the eventual jump the Western made to Junior A. The Lincolns joined the current Western Junior "B" league in 1969.

Behind the Waterloo Siskins, the Lincolns are the second oldest Junior "B" team in all of Ontario.

=== Coaching staff ===
- Head Coach / Assistant GM - Jeff Bradley
- Assistant coach - Mike Siddall
- Assistant coach - Mike Herman

== Season-by-season results ==
Season	GP	W	L	T	OTL	GF	GA	P	Results	Playoffs
1956-57	27	9	17	1	-	107	169	19	4th WOJBHL	
1957-58	30	18	11	1	-	--	--	37	3rd WOJBHL	
1958-59	36	18	16	2	-	207	210	38	2nd WOJBHL	
1959-60	30	24	5	1	-	--	--	49	1st WOJBHL	Won league
1960-61	32	27	4	1	-	265	119	55	1st WOJBHL	Won league
1961-62	36	19	15	2	-	187	161	40	3rd WOJBHL	
1962-63	35	28	7	0	-	282	159	56	1st WOJBHL	Won league, won SC
1963-64	40	28	12	0	-	235	194	56	3rd WOJBHL	
1964-65	42	15	25	2	-	181	223	32	7th CJBHL	
1965-66	40	19	20	1	-	200	202	39	4th CJBHL	
1966-67	32	15	12	5	-	166	166	35	3rd CJBHL	
1967-68	40	23	15	2	-	285	186	48	1st CJBHL	
1968-69	36	9	20	7	-	149	176	25	6th CJBHL	
1969-70	36	14	19	3	-	146	162	31	4th WOJHL	
1970-71	40	26	12	2	-	240	201	54	3rd WOJHL	
1971-72	39	27	9	3	-	254	152	57	2nd WOJHL	Won league, lost SC final
1972-73	42	19	19	4	-	233	244	42	4th WOJHL	
1973-74	39	23	10	6	-	206	148	52	2nd WOJHL	
1974-75	40	18	17	5	-	188	171	41	4th WOJHL	
1975-76	40	28	5	7	-	257	136	63	1st WOJHL	Won league, won SC
1976-77	40	21	13	6	-	213	172	48	1st WOJHL	
1977-78	38	14	21	3	-	133	193	31	4th WOJHL	
1978-79	42	8	31	3	-	167	298	19	7th WOJHL	
1979-80	42	8	27	7	-	158	241	23	7th WOJHL	
1980-81	42	2	38	2	-	100	318	6	8th WOJHL	
1981-82	42	12	24	6	-	182	219	30	7th WOJHL	
1982-83	42	8	28	6	-	160	224	22	8th WOJHL	
1983-84	48	28	13	7	-	258	186	63	3rd WOJHL	
1984-85	48	31	11	6	-	271	186	68	2nd WOJHL	Won league
1985-86	42	17	20	5	-	211	247	39	5th WOJHL	
1986-87	42	31	7	4	-	323	212	66	1st WOJHL	
1987-88	42	26	12	1	3	249	212	56	2nd WOJHL	
1988-89	42	16	21	3	2	201	228	37	6th WOJHL	
1989-90	40	17	17	3	3	209	183	40	5th WOJHL	
1990-91	48	16	28	2	2	223	256	36	7th WOJHL	
1991-92	48	21	24	2	1	228	220	45	2nd WOJHL East	
1992-93	52	42	8	2	0	-	-	86	1st WOJHL East	Lost final
1993-94	52	42	8	2	0	310	156	86	1st WOJHL East	Won league
1994-95	52	33	15	0	4	257	174	70	2nd WOJHL East	
1995-96	52	12	37	3	0	172	258	27	5th WOJHL East	
1996-97	51	5	40	6	0	157	314	16	5th WOJHL East	
1997-98	52	15	32	2	3	196	281	35	4th WOJHL East	
1998-99	52	22	25	0	5	266	260	49	3rd WOJHL East	
1999-00	54	9	40	0	5	146	279	23	10th GOHL	
2000-01	54	26	21	3	4	187	186	59	5th GOHL	
2001-02	54	24	26	2	2	224	247	52	7th WOJHL	
2002-03	48	19	25	1	3	158	191	42	7th WOJHL	
2003-04	48	13	32	1	2	127	222	29	8th WOJHL	
2004-05	48	24	19	0	5	157	178	53	4th WOJHL	
2005-06	48	33	13	1	1	155	116	68	1st WOJHL	Lost final
2006-07	48	29	17	-	2	193	154	60	3rd WOJHL	Lost semi-final
2007-08	48	31	12	-	5	193	142	67	2nd GOJHL-W	Lost Conf. SF
2008-09	52	36	15	-	1	213	160	73	3rd GOJHL-W	Lost Conf. SF
2009-10	50	31	15	-	4	201	169	66	4th GOJHL-W	Lost Conf. QF
2010-11	51	28	18	-	5	211	168	61	5th GOJHL-W	Lost Conf. QF
2011-12	51	22	17	-	12	197	196	56	4th GOJHL-W	Lost Conf. SF
2012-13	51	17	32	-	2	157	216	36	9th GOJHL-W	Did not qualify
2013-14	49	9	39	-	1	120	276	19	8th GOJHL-W	Lost Conf. QF
2014-15	49	2	43	-	4	85	265	8	9th GOJHL-W	Did not qualify
2015-16	50	9	36	1	4	136	262	23	8th of 9-W; 24th of 26-GOJHL	Lost Conf. Quarters, 0-4 (Flyers)
2016-17	50	20	28	1	1	162	223	42	6th of 9-W; 18th of 27-GOJHL	Lost Conf. Quarters, 1-4 (Nationals)
2017-18	50	10	33	2	5	129	247	27	9th of 9-W; 25th of 26-GOJHL	Did not qualify
2018-19	48	11	30	3	4	134	201	29	9th of 9-W; 21st of 25-GOJHL	Did not qualify
2019-20	50	30	13	3	4	192	139	67	3rd of 9-W; 9th of 26-GOJHL	Won Conf. Quarters, 4-1 (Rockets); Incomplete Conf. Semifinals 0-1 (Flyers); Playoffs cancelled due to pandemic
2020-21	Season lost due to COVID-19 pandemic									
2021-22	48	26	21	0	1	158	148	53	5th of 9-W; 13th of 25-GOJHL	Won Conf. Quarters, 4-3 (Vipers); Lost Conf. Semifinals 2-4 (Flyers)
2022-23	50	34	13	3	0	202	152	71	3rd of 9-W; 8th of 25-GOJHL	Won Conf. Quarters, 4-0 (Rockets); Won Conf. Semifinals 4-0 (Nationals); Lost Conf. Finals 1-4 (Flyers)
2023-24	50	33	11	5	1	200	130	72	2nd of 8-W; 6th of 23-GOJHL	Won Conf. Quarters, 4-0 (Legionnaires); Won Conf. Semifinals 4-0 (Rockets); Won Conf. Finals 4-3 (Nationals); 2-2 Dbl Rd Robin (Meteors) & (Cyclones); Advance to finals Lost Finals 1-4 (Cyclones)
2024-25	50	42	6	1	1	231	91	86	1st of 12 West Conf; 1st of 23-GOJHL	Won Conf. Quarters, 4-1 (Siskins); Won Conf. Semifinals 4-0 (Nationals); Lost Conf. Finals 3-4 (Maroons)
2025-26	50	36	11	3	0	209	120	75	3rd of 12 West Conf; 6th of 23-GOJHL	Won Conf. Quarters, 4-1 (Rockets); Won Conf. Semifinals 4-2 (Sugar Kings); Won Conf. Finals 4-3 (Warriors); Lost Finals 1-4 Redhawks

== Sutherland Cup appearances ==
1963: St. Marys Lincolns defeated Kingston Frontenacs 4-games-to-1
1972: Markham Waxers defeated St. Marys Lincolns 4-games-to-1
1976: St. Marys Lincolns defeated Collingwood Blues 4-games-to-3
2024: Listowel Cyclones defeated St. Marys Lincolns 4-games-to-1
2026: Cambridge Redhawks defeated St. Marys Lincolns 4-games-to-1

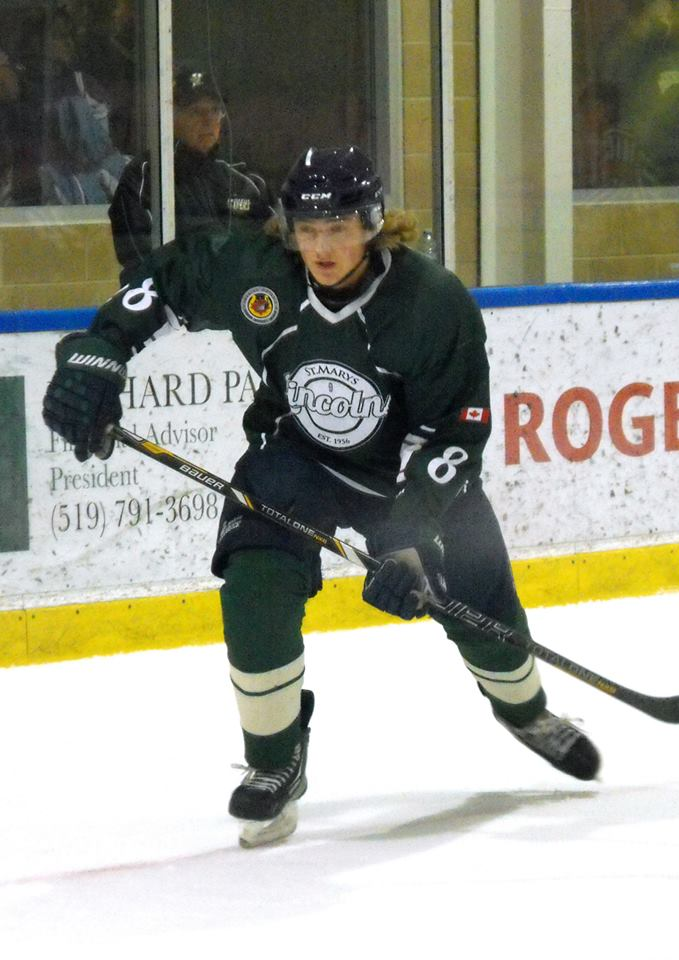
Lincolns player in 2014.

== Notable alumni ==
- Bob Boughner
- Dan Bylsma
- Terry Crisp
- Matt Dalton
- Scott Driscoll (linesman)
- Carter George
- Josh Gratton
- Seth Griffith
- Lonnie Loach
- Don Luce
- Mark Mancari
- Rick McCann
- Steve Miller (linesman)
- Mike Minard
- Cal O'Reilly
- J. P. Parisé
- Nathan Perrott
- Matt Read
- Bryan Rodney
- Steve Shields
- John Tripp
- Jack Valiquette

Coaches with NHL Experience

- Dave MacQueen
- Merlin Malinowski
- Dan Seguin
- Walter Tkaczuk
