= LaSalle Vipers =

- City: LaSalle, Ontario, Canada
- League: Greater Ontario Hockey League
- Division: Western
- Founded: 1970
- Home arena: Vollmer Culture and Recreation Complex
- Colours: Navy Blue, Red, Grey & White
- Owner: John Savage
- General manager: John Nelson
- Head coach: Anthony Iaquinta
- Affiliates: Windsor Spitfires (OHL)

Franchise history
- 1970-1986: Windsor Royals
- 1986-1995: Windsor Bulldogs
- 1995-2001: Tecumseh Bulldogs
- 2001-2008: Tecumseh Chiefs
- 2008-Present: LaSalle Vipers

The LaSalle Vipers are a Canadian junior ice hockey team based in LaSalle, Ontario, Canada. They play in the Western division of the Greater Ontario Hockey League. As a franchise, the Vipers are two-time Sutherland Cup provincial champions, two-time Great Lakes champions and five-time Western Ontario champions.

== History ==
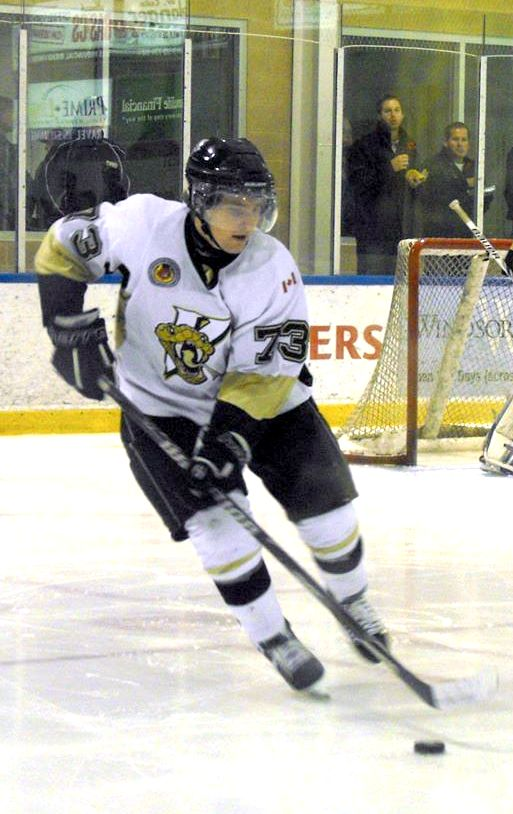
Vipers defenceman Andrew Burns skates during a home game at the Vollmer Centre during the 2013–14 season(October 2013).

=== The Royals ===
The expansion of the Windsor Royals started to circulate in the Windsor Star around July 1970. The Border Cities League had decided to no longer incorporate American teams and was looking to change its name. It also wanted to operate at a Junior B level. The team was based in St. Clair Beach in Tecumseh, Ontario. The team's first ever coach was Cliff Stevens. The Royals played their first ever game as members of the Great Lakes Junior Hockey League at home in St. Clair Beach Arena against the Blenheim Golden Blades on October 11, 1970. The Royals were victorious, crushing the Blades 13–5. Bill Salzer scored the first goal in team history 1:29 into the first period. Salzer added one more goal and three assists, while teammate Rich Bissonnette aided with five assists. At the end of the 1970–71 season, the Royals finished in third place with a record of 23 wins, 13 losses, and 4 ties. As the league had included a pair of Junior C teams in their loop, the Royals acquired the second seed in the league playoffs. In the league semi-final, the Royals drew the winless, last place Tilbury Bluebirds (0–40–0). Things did not improve for the Bluebirds. On February 23, at St. Clair Beach, the Glen Urquhart led the way for the Royals with three goals and two assists in a 14–1 romp of Tilbury. This gave Windsor the first playoff win in their history. Ted Pruyn picked up the win in net. Game two was a different story in Tilbury, as the Bluebirds kept it close but the Royals prevailed 4–3. The Royals ended the Best-of-5 series in game three with a 7–3 win. The victory gave the Royals their first ever playoff series victory. In the league final, the Royals would meet the first place Petrolia Jets (31–8–1). The Royals took game one at home 6–3, but went on the road in Petrolia and dropped game two 4–0. The walls caved in on the Royals in games three and four, losing 12–3 and 9–1 on back-to-back nights to fall behind in the series 3-games-to-1. On March 17, the Royals traveled to Petrolia and again were crushed, 13–2, to end the series and their playoffs.

In their second season, the Royals relocated to the Riverside Arena and finished in third place in the GLJHL (2nd amongst Junior B teams). In the playoffs, the Royals drew the Blenheim Golden Blades in the semi-final and beat them 3-games-to-1 to again meet the Petrolia Jets in the final. Game one in Riverside saw the Royals lose 7–2 to the Jets, despite starting future pro goaltender Tony Piroski (35 saves on the night). Game two in Petrolia did not go much better, as Greg Cecile made 31 saves for the Royals in a 7–4 loss. The Royals were never given the chance to redeem themselves, as the Jets swept them in four games to end their season. The 1971-72 also included future NHLer Ted Bulley

In 1972, the Royals moved, this time to the Windsor Arena in Downtown Windsor. Their rival, the Petrolia Jets, jumped to the Western Ontario Junior B Hockey League, clearing the Royals of their biggest hurdle in the league Junior B playoffs. The Royals would feature future NHL goaltender Rick Heinz during the 1972–73 season. The Royals finished the season in first place with a record of 34 wins, 6 losses, and 2 ties. In the 1973 league semi-final, the Royals faced the last place Sandwich West Thunderbirds of present-day LaSalle. In game one, at the Windsor Arena, the Royals beat the Thunderbirds 8–2. The Royals would take the series in a three-game sweep. In the finals against the Blenheim Golden Blades, the Blades would draw first blood, beating the Royals at home 3–1. At home, the Royals would gain some revenge in game two, beating the Blades 10–2. At home again, the Royals would defeat the Blades 6–3 in game three. Back in Blenheim for game four, the Royals kept the momentum going with a 9–2 win. On March 10, 1973, the Royals defeated the Blades 4–3 to win the series 4-games-to-1 and win their first ever league championship. Fred Gagnon scored the winner for the Royals with only 38 seconds to go in the game. The Leamington Flyers won the Great Lakes Junior C championship and challenged the Royals to a best-of-5 Grand Championship. The two teams finished the league in first with identical records, but the Flyers were awarded first on a better head-to-head record, despite the Royals having a much better Goals For/Against ratio. In Leamington, the Flyers would take game one 7–6. Back at the Windsor Arena, Vince Mullins scored a hat-trick, for the Royals, in game two to even the series with a 6–3 win. At home again for game three, the Royals defeated Leamington 6–2. Leamington came back in game four with a 7–5 win to tie the series. The series remained unresolved, as the Flyers were required to carry on their playoffs by the OHA, while the Royals still waited on their next opponent. The Royals ended up playing the Western Ontario Junior B Hockey League Champion Sarnia Bees in the Sutherland Cup quarter-final. The Bees swept the Royals with scores of 6–5, 6–5, 4–3, and 7–3 to move on to the next round.

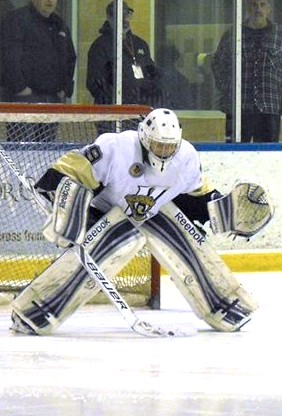
Vipers goalie staring down penalty shot during 2013–14 season.

In the summer of 1973, the Royals and their Tier II Junior A affiliate, the Windsor Spitfires, broke off their affiliation agreement over each other's wishes to apply for expansion into the Ontario Major Junior Hockey League - a deadline that was upcoming to make the move for the start of the 1974–75 season. The Spitfires chose to affiliated with the ill-fated Belle River Bulldogs for 1973–74 instead. The Royals also requested a move to the Western Ontario Junior B Hockey League, a more skillful league than the GLJHL, but were denied.

In the spring of 1974, both the Royals and Southern Ontario Junior A Hockey League's Windsor Spitfires put in rival bids in an attempt to promote one of the two teams to the Major Junior A level. Both bids were rejected due to lack of a suitable arena. A year later, the Ontario Major Junior Hockey League (OHL as of 1980) granted expansion to the Spitfires.

=== The Bulldogs ===
The Royals in 1986 were renamed the Bulldogs and moved up to Junior "B". The team was sold in 1995 and moved out of Windsor, Ontario into the Tecumseh area, and became known as the Chiefs.

In one the franchise's last games in the city of Windsor, the Bulldogs set a league record for futility by suffering the worst loss in Western Ontario Hockey League history. On January 20, 1995, the Leamington Flyers defeated the Bulldogs by a score of 30–3.

=== The Chiefs ===
Tecumseh Chiefs

On February 20, 2008, the Chiefs remembered their former "rookie of the year" Mickey Renaud. Renaud, alumnus and captain of the Windsor Spitfires, died two days earlier after collapsing in his parents home in Tecumseh. After a memorial, the Chiefs announced that Renaud's number, 44, would be retired at the end of the season.

==== 2007–08 championship season ====
The 2007–08 season marked the Chiefs' best season since moving to Tecumseh. The Chiefs, members of the newly formed Greater Ontario Junior Hockey League became their first league regular season champions finishing first overall in their conference with 34 wins, 12 losses, and 2 losses in overtime.

After defeating the London Nationals to win their first Western Ontario crown since 1980, the Chiefs made it known to the press that they are considering a move to LaSalle, Ontario due to a lack of fan support.

The Chiefs entered the 2008 Sutherland Cup against the Thorold Blackhawks and the Elmira Sugar Kings. They finished the round robin in first place with 3 wins and 1 loss. They then faced the Sugar Kings in a best-of-seven series to determine the champion, defeating them in 4 straight games to win their first ever provincial title.

After 13 seasons in the town of Tecumseh and winning the 2008 Sutherland Cup Provincial Championship, the town of Tecumseh announced that the franchise elected not to return to their arena. The team relocated to LaSalle. This marks the third Greater Windsor Area location that the team has called home in 38 seasons.

=== The Vipers ===
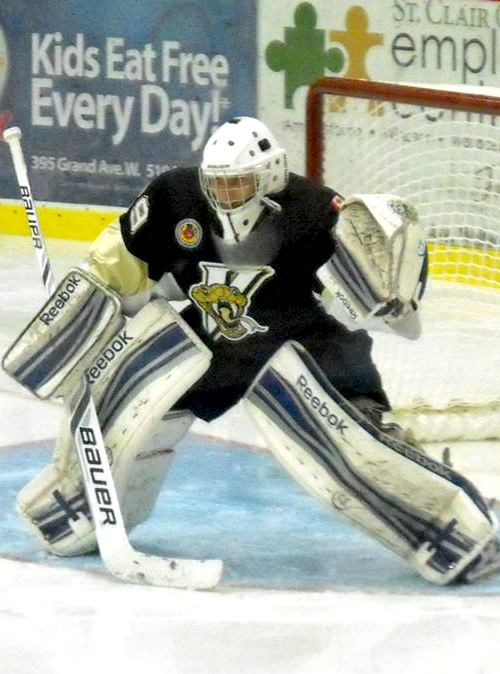
Vipers goalie on road (October 2013).

On July 9, the ownership of the team held a press conference to unveil the LaSalle Vipers and their new logo. On September 10, the Vipers played their first game in LaSalle, losing 4–2 to the Leamington Flyers.

==== 2009–10 championship season ====
After a bit of a rebuilding year in 2008–09 to readjust after moving, the LaSalle Vipers showed themselves to be one of the top teams in the GOJHL during the first half of 2009–10. A mid-season slump put the Vipers near the basement of the Western Conference, but by the end of the season the Vipers had come together and reached the 5th seed of the conference with 30 wins. In the Western quarter-final, the Vipers defeated the fourth seeded St. Marys Lincolns 4-games-to-1. In the semi-final, the Vipers drew third seed and rival Chatham Maroons. A hard-fought battle occurred, with the Vipers winning 4-games-to-2. In an upset, the seventh seeded St. Thomas Stars defeated the first place London Nationals, setting up an unlikely final between the fifth and seventh seeds of the conference. The Vipers would defeat the Stars 4-games-to-2 to take their second Western Championship in three years. The Vipers then moved on to the Sutherland Cup round robin semi-final with the first seed of the Mid-Western Conference Brantford Eagles and the second seed of the Golden Horseshoe Conference Stoney Creek Warriors. All three teams had appeared in the Sutherland Cup finals in the previous two seasons. LaSalle took the round robin with a 3–1 record, second was Brantford with a 2–2 record, and third was Stoney Creek, 1-3 and eliminated. The final was the battle of the 2008 and 2009 Sutherland Cup champions. The Vipers took an early 3-games-to-none lead in the series. Brantford took Game 4. LaSalle played Game 5 at home and took it in double overtime on a goal by DJ Turner.

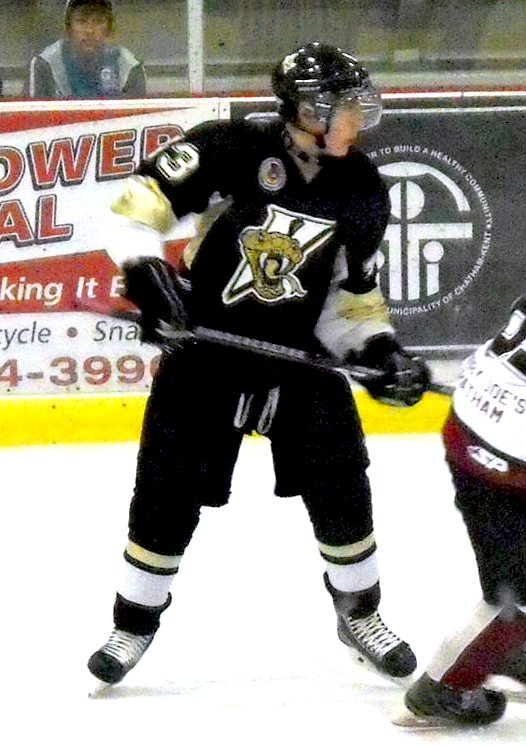
Vipers forward on road (October 2013).

==== 2010 ====
The LaSalle Vipers were invited by Hockey Canada and the Ontario Hockey Association to represent Canada in a pair of exhibition games in Mexico City, Mexico against the Mexico Under-20 World Junior Team. The first game, on December 16, 2010, saw the Vipers win 9–2. Billed as "Canada Night" by Mexico's Ice Hockey Federation, the Vipers' win was nationally televised across Mexico. A second game was to be played, but was cancelled due to poor ice conditions.

==== 2011–12 season ====
On December 12, 2011, the Lasalle Vipers fired head coach John Nelson after a 13–15–2 8th-place start to the season. Nelson had a 92–70–21 record in 3 1/2 seasons behind the Lasalle bench. Notable acquiring's: After an abysmal start to the season, the Vipers Management staff made some transactions throughout the league and also some signings from outside the league. A round of try-outs were held for 8 defensemen as the defense stats were not getting it done for the club with a goals against average (GAA) of 5.23 in the first 30 games of the 2011 season. Only 2 defencemen made the cut, (Ben Mannell - LH/D) of Chatham and the other being a Essex-County local (Lyndon Barnet - RH/D) who played a stretch of exhibition games with the squad in the 2011-2012 season with a stat line of (5 GP- 1G, 3A, +/-(+8) and a notable 27 PMS) Management was content with the 2 young defencemen who actually got to play alongside each other in a couple of games but ultimately (Barnet) broke his hand in his second last fight with the club and (Mannell) was released after 10 games.

==== 2012–13 season ====
The LaSalle Vipers hired Ryan Donally as the team's head coach in April. They finished third in the Western Conference behind the Chatham Maroons and Leamington Flyers with 29 wins and 62 points. They were led offensively by Dylan Denommé's 34 goals and 76 points. Taylor Speed recorded 22 wins.

==== 2013–14 season ====
The LaSalle Vipers hired former NHLer and Windsor Spitfires all-time leading scorer Bill Bowler to be their head coach and general manager. The Vipers started the season with a 14–0–1 stretch that kept them in first place until the season's final month, before ultimately being passed by the Leamington Flyers.

Dylan Denomme led the team in scoring with 72 points in 39 games. Paolo Battisti and Cameron Zanussi each started 26 games, winning 15 and 17 games respectively. Taylor Speed won two games before joining the University of Windsor Lancers.

They finished the season in second place and drew a first round matchup with the St. Thomas Stars, who they defeated in five games. They were swept in the second round of the playoffs by the Chatham Maroons.

Rookie Devon Paliani led the team in playoff scoring with 11 goals and 15 points in nine games. Following the season, Paliani would be signed by the OHL's Sudbury Wolves. Also signed to an OHL contracts was defenceman Austin Hall, while Denomme joined the University of Windsor Lancers.

Paliani was named GOJHL Western Conference Rookie of the Year, while Mark Manchurek earned Top Rookie Scorer honours. Battisti (February) and Zanussi (October) each won Goaltender of the Month honours, while defenceman Brett Langlois (October) won Defenceman of the Month. Denomme was nominated for league MVP and was named to the All-Star team. Andrew Burns was named Most Outstanding First Year Defenceman.

The Vipers bench, led by Bill Bowler, also won coaching staff of the year.

==== 2014–15 season ====
The Vipers signed rookie forwards Manny Silverio and Brett Primeau July 17 after impressive performances in the team's rookie camp.

== Season-by-season results ==
Season	GP	W	L	T	OTL	GF	GA	P	Results	Playoffs
Windsor Royals
1970–71	40	23	13	4	-	296	192	50	3rd of 6 GLJHL	Won semi-final, 3-0 (Bluebirds); Lost final, 1-4 (Jets)
1971–72	36	19	12	5	-	176	130	43	3rd of 7 GLJHL	Won semi-final, 3-1 (Blades); Lost final, 0-4 (Jets)
1972–73	45	34	6	2	-	349	141	70	1st of 8 GLJHL	Won semi-final, 3-0 (Thunderbirds); Won League, 4-1 (Blades); Lost SC QF, 0-4 (Bees)
1973–74	43	31	8	4	-	322	132	66	2nd of 10 GLJHL	Won semi-final, 3-0 (Bluebirds); Won League, 4-1 (Bulldogs); Lost SC QF, 0-4 (Bees)
1974–75	40	17	20	3	-	157	193	37	5th of 6 WOJHL	DNQ
1975–76	38	15	16	7	-	206	221	37	4th of 7 WOJHL	Lost semi-final, 0-4 (Lincolns)
1976–77	40	15	16	9	-	189	178	39	5th of 6 WOJHL	DNQ
1977–78	40	30	6	4	-	260	126	64	1st of 6 WOJHL	Won semi-final, 4-1 (Bees); Won League, 4-1 (Jets); Won SC QF, 4-0 (Canadians); Lost SC SF, 0-4 (Derbys)
1978–79	42	31	7	4	-	314	172	66	1st of 8 WOJHL	Won semi-final, 9-1 pts (Maroons); Won League, 4-0 (Rockets); Won SC QF, 4-2 (Cullitons); Lost SC SF, 1-4 (Falcons)
1979–80	41	30	7	4	-	276	151	64	1st of 8 WOJHL	Won semi-final, 4-1 (Jets); Won League, 4-0 (Nationals); Won SC QF, 4-3 (Siskins); Won SC SF, 4-2 (Canadians); Lost SC Final, 0-4 (Bobcats)
1980–81	42	26	16	0	-	238	176	52	4th of 8 WOJHL	Lost semi-final, 0-4 (Nationals)
1981–82	42	25	13	4	-	252	186	54	2nd of 8 WOJHL	Lost quarter-final, 1-3 (Jets)
1982-83	42	17	20	5	-	190	222	39	5th of 8 WOJHL	Won quarter-final, 2-1 (Rockets); Lost semi-final, 3-4 (Bees)
1983-84	48	24	18	6	-	257	195	54	4th of 9 WOJHL	Lost semi-final, 0-4 (Nationals)
1984-85	48	13	30	5	-	196	246	31	6th of 7 WOJHL	DNQ
1985-86	42	9	30	3	-	185	287	21	7th of 8 WOJHL	DNQ
Windsor Bulldogs
1986-87	42	6	33	3	-	187	291	15	8th of 8 WOJHL	DNQ
1987-88	42	20	15	6	1	192	200	47	4th of 8 WOJHL	Lost quarter-final, 1-4 (Bees)
1988-89	42	24	13	2	3	214	186	53	4th of 8 WOJHL	Lost semi-final, 1-4 (Bees)
1989-90	39	21	17	0	1	197	182	43	3rd of 9 WOJHL	Won quarter-final, 4-2 (Stars); Lost semi-final, 1-4 (Maroons)
1990-91	48	34	11	3	0	266	164	71	1st of 9 WOJHL	Won quarter-final, 4-1 (Nationals); Lost semi-final, 1-4 (Maroons)
1991-92	50	33	16	1	0	279	213	67	1st of 4 West; 1st of 9 WOJHL	Won quarter-final, 4-2 (Jets); Won semi-final, 4-3 (Bees); Lost final, 3-4 (Nationals)
1992-93	52	35	13	3	1	-	-	74	2nd of 5 West; 3rd of 10 WOJHL	Won quarter-final, 4-2 (Maroons); Lost semi-final, 0-4 (Bees)
1993-94	50	14	34	2	0	252	352	30	5th of 5 West; 9th of 10 WOJHL	DNQ
1994-95	52	5	43	0	4	169	328	14	5th of 5 West; 10th of 10 WOJHL	DNQ
Tecumseh Bulldogs
1995–96	52	27	21	3	1	247	235	58	2nd of 4 West; 5th of 10 WOJHL	Lost quarter-final, 0-4 (Jets)
1996–97	52	31	16	3	2	256	221	67	2nd of 5 West; 3rd of 10 WOJHL	Lost quarter-final, 2-4 (Jets)
1997–98	52	19	27	3	3	168	254	44	4th of 5 West; 7th of 10 WOJHL	Lost quarter-final, 1-4 (Maroons)
1998–99	51	23	26	0	2	221	245	48	4th of 5 West; 7th of 10 WOJHL	Lost quarter-final, 1-4 (Flyers)
1999–00	54	25	25	0	4	182	210	54	6th of 10 GOHL	Won quarter-final, 4-3 (Flyers); Lost semi-final, 0-4 (Maroons)
2000–01	54	12	40	0	2	165	314	26	9th of 10 GOHL	DNQ
Tecumseh Chiefs
2001–02	54	18	32	2	2	163	236	40	8th of 10 GOHL	Lost quarter-final, 0-4 (Maroons)
2002–03	48	10	36	1	1	121	261	22	9th of 9 WOHL	DNQ
2003–04	48	20	23	1	4	161	197	45	7th of 9 WOHL	Lost quarter-final, 2-4 (Maroons)
2004–05	48	22	23	2	1	175	179	47	7th of 9 WOHL	Lost quarter-final, 1-4 (Stars)
2005–06	48	24	20	2	2	164	171	52	5th of 9 WOHL	Lost quarter-final, 1-4 (Jets)
2006–07	48	27	17	-	4	223	161	58	4th of 9 WOHL	Lost quarter-final, 0-4 (Maroons)
2007–08	48	34	12	-	2	235	128	70	1st of 9 West; 2nd of 26 GOJHL	Won Conf. QF, 4-0 (Maroons); Won Conf. SF, 4-1 (Rockets); Won Conf. Final, 4-1 (Nationals); First in SF Round Robin (3–1); Won League, 4-0 (Sugar Kings)
LaSalle Vipers
2008–09	52	21	26	-	5	186	197	47	7th of 9 West; 18th of 26 GOJHL	Lost Conf. QF, 1-4 (Nationals)
2009–10	50	30	16	-	4	261	184	64	5th of 9 West; 10th of 25 GOJHL	Won Conf. QF, 4-1 (Lincolns); Won Conf. SF, 4-2 (Maroons); Won Conf. Final, 4-2 (Stars); First in SF Round Robin (3–1); Won League, 4-1 (Eagles)
2010-11	51	28	13	-	10	252	217	66	3rd of 9 West; 11th of 26 GOJHL	Won Conf. QF, 4-3 (Flyers); Lost Conf. SF, 3-4 (Nationals)
2011-12	51	25	23	-	3	188	198	53	6th of 9 West; 15th of 26 GOJHL	Lost Conf. QF, 1-4 (Nationals)
2012-13	51	29	18	-	4	196	171	62	3rd of 9 West; 9th of 26 GOJHL	Lost Conf. QF, 2-4 (Rockets)
2013-14	49	34	10	-	5	229	151	73	2nd of 9 West; T-5th of 27 GOJHL	Won Conf. QF, 4-1 (Stars); Lost Conf. SF, 0-4 (Maroons)
2014-15	49	28	20	-	1	207	174	57	4th of 9 West; 13th of 26 GOJHL	Won Conf. QF, 4-0 (Predators); Won Conf. SF, 4-2 (Nationals); Lost Conf. Final, 2-4 (Flyers); Won SF, 4-3 (Sugar Kings); Lost final, 2-4 (Corvairs)
2015-16	50	31	14	3	2	215	162	67	3rd of 9 West; 7th of 26 GOJHL	Won Conf. QF, 4-3 (Legionnaires); Lost Conf. SF 2-4 (Nationals)
2016-17	50	37	9	0	4	224	136	78	1st of 9 West; 4th of 27 GOJHL	Won Conf. QF, 4-0 (Rockets); Lost Conf. SF, 2-4 (Flyers)
2017–18	50	32	16	1	1	182	141	66	3rd of 9 West; 9th of 26 GOJHL	Lost Conf. QF, 3-4 (Maroons)
2018–19	48	22	20	2	4	181	189	50	5th of 9 West; 14th of 25 GOJHL	Won Conf. QF, 4-0 (Legionnaires); Lost Conf. Semis 1-4 (Nationals)
2019–20	50	25	19	1	5	201	163	56	4th of 9 West; 13th of 26 GOJHL	Won Conf. QF, 4-3 (Maroons); Incomplete Conf. Semis 0-1(Nationals); Playoffs cancelled - covid
2020–21	Season lost due to covid-19 pandemic									
2021–22	48	27	17	3	1	163	140	58	5th of 9 West; 14th of 25 GOJHL	Lost Conf. QF, 3-4 (Lincolns)
2022–23	50	33	15	1	1	200	151	68	4th of 9 West; 10th of 25 GOJHL	Won Conf. QF, 4-1 (Maroons); Lost Conf. Semis 0-4(Flyers)
2023–24	50	30	19	1	0	197	149	61	4th of 8 West; 12th of 23 GOJHL	Won Conf. QF, 4-2 (Maroons); Lost Conf Semifinal, 1-4 (Nationals)
2024–25	50	29	20	1	0	175	181	59	6th of 12 West Conf; 11th of 23 GOJHL	Lost Conf. QF, 0-4 (Warriors)
2025–26	50	25	22	3	0	188	180	53	7th of 12 West Conf; 12th of 23 GOJHL	Lost Conf. QF, 2-4 (Sugar Kings)

== 2022–2023 coaching staff ==
- GM/Head Coach - John Nelson
- Head Coach - Matt Beaudoin
- Assistant Coach - Chad Shepley
- Assistant Coach - Nathan Savage
- Strength/Conditioning Coach - Kyle Bezaire
- Goalie Coach - Derion Ducedre
- Video Coach - Joe Donato
- Trainer - Randy Levac
- Equipment Manager - Barry Galerno

== Sutherland Cup appearances ==
1980: Belleville Bobcats defeated Windsor Royals 4-games-to-none
2008: Tecumseh Chiefs defeated Elmira Sugar Kings 4-games-to-none
2010: LaSalle Vipers defeated Brantford Eagles 4-games-to-1
2015: Caledonia Corvairs defeated LaSalle Vipers 4-games-to-2

== Notable alumni ==
- Russ Adam
- Ted Bulley
- Stubby Clapp
- Tie Domi
- Murray Eaves
- David Gagnon
- Rick Heinz
- Dan Jancevski
- Ed Jovanovski
- Tim Kerr
- Richard Kromm
- Mike Natyshak
- Joel Quenneville
- Mickey Renaud
- D. J. Smith
- Hunter Smith
- Kyle Wellwood
- Derek Wilkinson
- Garrett Wilson
