= Leamington Flyers =

Junior ice hockey team in Ontario, Canada

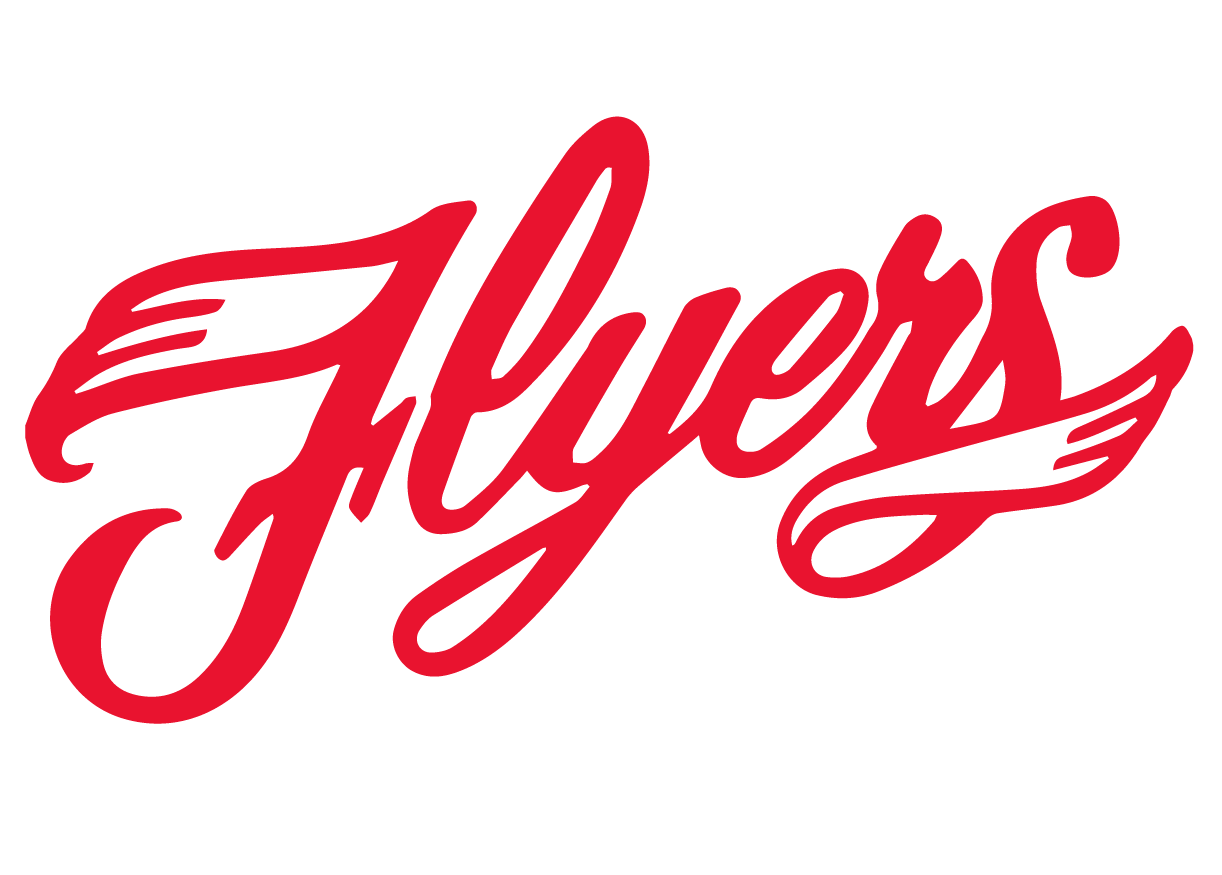
- City: Leamington, Ontario, Canada
- League: Ontario Junior Hockey League
- Founded: 1954
- Home arena: Nature Fresh Farms Recreation Centre
- Colours: Red and White
- Owners: Cam Crowder – Jason Melo – Craig Mahon – Dan Jancevski – David Halliwill
- General manager: Dale Mitchell
- Head coach: Dale Mitchell
- Affiliates: Flint Firebirds (OHL)

Current uniform

The Leamington Flyers are a junior ice hockey team based in Leamington, Ontario, Canada. They play in the Ontario Junior Hockey League. Prior to 2023 they played in the Western division of the Greater Ontario Junior Hockey League. They are an affiliate of the Ontario Hockey League's Flint Firebirds.

== History ==
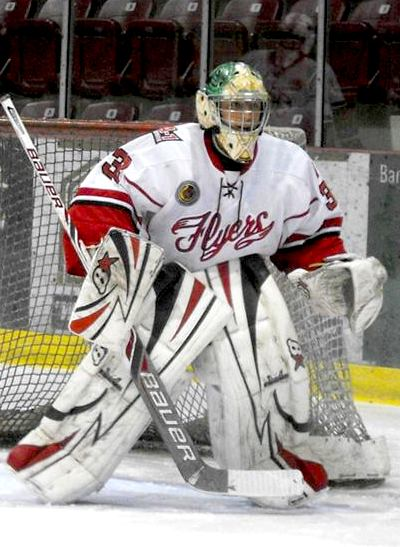
Flyers goalie during 2013–14 season.

Bill Burgess, coach and general manager of the local Intermediate Flyers, formed the Junior Flyers in 1954. They were a Junior B team in the Southwestern League until 1958 when they quit the league.

The Flyers were a part of the BCJBHL 1958 until 1964. When the OHA allowed the Border Cities League to fail in 1964, the town mothballed the junior team and operated a top-notch juvenile team in its stead. In 1966, the team operated as an independent team, playing only in OHA playdowns and exhibition against local all-star, juvenile, and intermediate teams. In 1967, they joined the Western Junior B League. They entered the new Border Cities league in 1968. When the league became the Great Lakes Junior C Hockey League in 1970, the Flyers stayed on board. The Flyers were promoted to the Western Junior "B" league in 1992. After winning the Sutherland Cup in 2023, the Flyers announced they were moving up to Junior A and playing in the Ontario Junior Hockey League

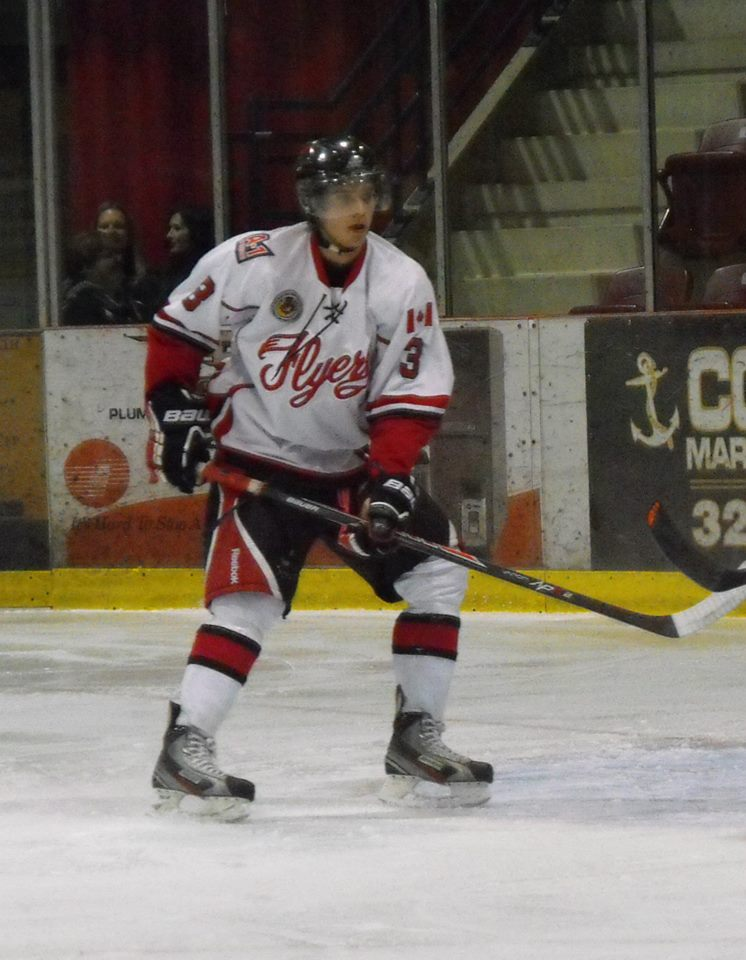
Flyers player during 2013–14 season.

On January 3, 1993, the Leamington Flyers helped set a record for the highest scoring tie in the history of the Western Ontario Hockey League by tying the London Nationals 11–11. The Flyers hold the record for the most lopsided game in the history of the WOHL. On January 20, 1995, the Flyers defeated the Windsor Bulldogs by a score of 30–3. On January 26, 2002, the Flyers set the WOHL record for largest margin in a shutout victory by defeating the Aylmer Aces by a score of 16–0.

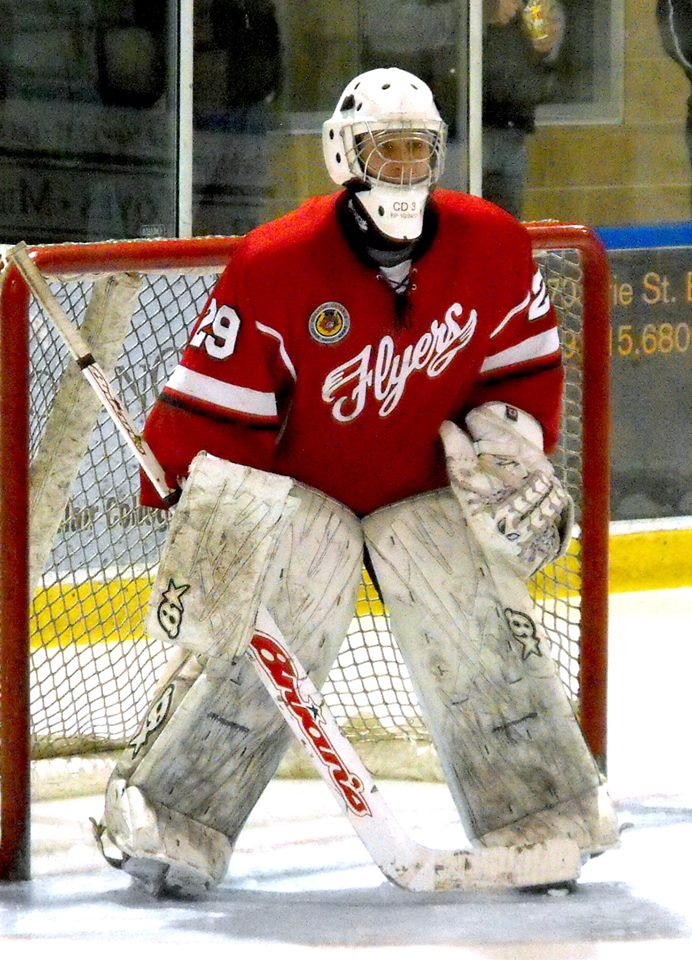
Flyers goalie during 2014–15 season on the road.

On Tuesday March 16, 2010, the Leamington Flyers hired Head Coach Tony Piroski. Previously, as coach of the Essex 73's, Piroski won seven Great Lakes Junior C Hockey League championships and three Clarence Schmalz Cups in nine seasons.

In Piroski's first season the team went from 7 wins to 26 wins, losing Game 7 in overtime to the Lasalle Vipers. In spring 2011 the Flyers brought aboard OHL scout Mike Sadler as the club's general manager.

On May 11, 2015, General Manager Mike Sadler stepped down from the organization. Kevin Hopper takes over as the team General Manager.

April 2, 2018, owner Abe Fehr announced that he had sold the team to five local businessman, Jason Melo, Dan Jancevski, Cam Crowder, David Halliwill & Craig Mahon. Eight-year Head Coach Tony Piroski also announced he would not be returning to the team. In eight seasons under Piroski the Flyers had a record of 262–108–31 (a .692 winning percentage) in 401 regular-season games with the Flyers and took the team to the conference final four-straight years with two titles.

April 10, 2018, Cam Crowder was named head coach of the Leamington Flyers. Starting the season with only 10 returning players, Leamington stumbled out of the gate with a 12–8–1–2 record. Following a shocking trade of their top two scorers Maddux Rychel and Griffin Robinson, Leamington went on to finish the regular season 21–4–1–1 and claim the Western Conference regular season title. Leamington played Strathroy in the first round and clinched the series 4–1. Moving on to the conference semifinals Leamington played a tightly contested playoff series coming back from a 1–3 deficit defeating the Komoka Kings on home ice to clinch the series 4–3. In the Western Conference finals the young Flyers team were out matched by a veteran London Nationals team, and were swept 0–4.

Although the season ended in disappointment, Leamington had a very successful season having multiple award winners. Adam Jeffrey Top Rookie Scorer, Ryan Gagnier Rookie of the year, Levi Tetrault Defenceman of year, Zach Borgiel Goalie of year, and Cam Crowder being named coach of the year.

The current version of the Leamington Flyers led by Cam Crowder and General Manager Justin Solcz, take great pride in competing for the Sutherland cup while developing players for higher levels of hockey. The 2018–19 team moved on two players to major junior (Ryan Gagnier Oshawa Generals and Colton O'Brien Quebec Remparts), and four players to tier II.

The Leamington Flyers and the Ontario Hockey League's Flint Firebirds announced an affiliation agreement in June 2019 prior to the 2019–2020 season.

In the 2022–23 season the Flyers finished the regular season with a record of 35–11–4 for a total of 72 points finishing first in the Western Conference. In the playoffs the Flyers swept the Sarnia Legionnaires and the LaSalle Vipers before defeating the St. Marys Lincolns 4–1 in the Western Conference finals. The Flyers went 2–2 in the Sutherland Cup Round Robin which was enough to advance to the Sutherland Cup Championship Series against the Stratford Warriors. The series went the full seven games and in the seventh and final game on May 9, the Flyers defeated the Warriors 4–0 to capture the franchise's first Sutherland Cup. Following the victory, on May 17 the Flyers announced they would be leaving the GOJHL to join the Junior A level Ontario Junior Hockey League for the 2023–24 season.

== Season-by-season results ==
| Season | GP | W | L | T | OTL | GF | GA | P | Results | Playoffs |
| 1958–59 | 20 | 5 | 14 | 1 | – | 67 | 103 | 11 | 4th BCJBHL | |
| 1959–60 | 29 | 6 | 23 | 0 | – | 109 | 181 | 12 | 6th BCJBHL | |
| 1960–61 | 29 | 7 | 22 | 0 | – | 105 | 223 | 14 | 7th BCJBHL | |
| 1961–62 | 30 | 13 | 17 | 0 | – | 132 | 156 | 26 | 5th BCJBHL | |
| 1962–63 | 36 | 11 | 25 | 0 | – | 134 | 203 | 22 | 6th BCJBHL | |
| 1963–64 | 28 | 16 | 12 | 0 | – | 139 | 147 | 32 | 3rd BCJBHL | |
| 1964–67 | No League, Dropped to Bluewater Juvenile | | | | | | | | | |
| 1967-68 | 51 | 5 | 46 | 0 | – | 160 | 355 | 10 | 5th WOJBHL | |
| 1968–69 | 30 | 21 | 8 | 1 | – | 171 | 119 | 43 | 2nd BCJHL | |
| 1969–70 | 34 | 23 | 9 | 2 | – | 159 | 104 | 48 | 2nd BCJHL | "C" Champions |
| 1970–71 | 40 | 30 | 8 | 2 | – | 247 | 133 | 62 | 2nd GLJHL | |
| 1971–72 | 36 | 20 | 12 | 4 | – | 209 | 169 | 44 | 2nd GLJHL | Won League; Won CSC |
| 1972–73 | 42 | 34 | 6 | 2 | – | 298 | 148 | 70 | 2nd GLJHL | Won League |
| 1973–74 | 43 | 19 | 20 | 4 | – | 184 | 193 | 42 | 6th GLJHL | Won League |
| 1974–75 | 42 | 25 | 9 | 8 | – | 220 | 129 | 58 | 2nd GLJHL | |
| 1975–76 | 42 | 26 | 13 | 3 | – | 235 | 173 | 55 | 3rd GLJHL | |
| 1976–77 | 42 | 22 | 16 | 4 | – | 201 | 166 | 48 | 2nd GLJHL | |
| 1977–78 | 42 | 21 | 16 | 5 | – | 204 | 206 | 47 | 3rd GLJHL | |
| 1978–79 | 40 | 15 | 19 | 6 | – | 226 | 223 | 36 | 6th GLJHL | |
| 1979–80 | 42 | 36 | 4 | 2 | – | 344 | 156 | 74 | 1st GLJHL | Won League; Won CSC |
| 1980–81 | 42 | 28 | 10 | 4 | – | 328 | 180 | 60 | 2nd GLJHL | Won League, lost CSC Semi-final |
| 1981–82 | 39 | 26 | 10 | 3 | – | 264 | 192 | 55 | 2nd GLJHL | |
| 1982–83 | 39 | 29 | 8 | 2 | – | 331 | 154 | 62 | 1st GLJHL | Won League, lost CSC Semi-final |
| 1983–84 | 40 | 19 | 16 | 5 | – | 180 | 170 | 43 | 5th GLJHL | Won League, lost CSC Semi-final |
| 1984–85 | 39 | 15 | 20 | 4 | – | 171 | 202 | 34 | 7th GLJHL | |
| 1985–86 | 40 | 13 | 20 | 7 | – | 205 | 252 | 33 | 7th GLJHL | |
| 1986–87 | 38 | 23 | 12 | 2 | 1 | 240 | 163 | 49 | 4th GLJHL | |
| 1987–88 | 39 | 26 | 10 | 3 | 0 | 247 | 157 | 55 | 1st GLJHL | |
| 1988–89 | 38 | 29 | 8 | 1 | 0 | 259 | 143 | 59 | 4th GLJHL | |
| 1989–90 | 40 | 21 | 13 | 4 | 2 | 194 | 176 | 48 | 4th GLJHL | |
| 1990–91 | 39 | 18 | 21 | 0 | 0 | 157 | 183 | 36 | 8th GLJHL | |
| 1991–92 | 42 | 13 | 25 | 2 | 2 | 163 | 232 | 30 | 10th GLJHL | |
| 1992–93 | 52 | 15 | 27 | 5 | 5 | – | – | 40 | 5th WOJHL West | |
| 1993–94 | 52 | 36 | 14 | 0 | 2 | 293 | 213 | 74 | 1st WOJHL West | |
| 1994–95 | 52 | 37 | 11 | 0 | 4 | 320 | 199 | 78 | 2nd WOJHL West | |
| 1995–96 | 52 | 34 | 10 | 6 | 2 | 303 | 202 | 76 | 1st WOJHL West | Lost final |
| 1996–97 | 52 | 31 | 13 | 3 | 5 | 276 | 198 | 70 | 1st WOJHL West | Lost final |
| 1997–98 | 52 | 29 | 19 | 3 | 1 | 189 | 171 | 62 | 2nd WOJHL West | |
| 1998–99 | 52 | 44 | 5 | 0 | 3 | 276 | 142 | 91 | 1st WOJHL West | |
| 1999–00 | 54 | 36 | 14 | 0 | 4 | 250 | 183 | 76 | 3rd GOHL | |
| 2000–01 | 54 | 24 | 24 | 4 | 2 | 176 | 187 | 54 | 6th GOHL | |
| 2001–02 | 54 | 36 | 15 | 2 | 1 | 276 | 172 | 75 | 2nd WOJHL | |
| 2002–03 | 48 | 37 | 8 | 1 | 2 | 231 | 131 | 77 | 1st WOJHL | |
| 2003–04 | 48 | 28 | 18 | 1 | 1 | 178 | 151 | 58 | 4th WOJHL | |
| 2004–05 | 48 | 20 | 20 | 3 | 5 | 166 | 179 | 48 | 6th WOJHL | |
| 2005–06 | 48 | 10 | 33 | 1 | 4 | 110 | 196 | 25 | 9th WOJHL | DNQ |
| 2006–07 | 48 | 17 | 28 | – | 3 | 159 | 199 | 37 | 8th WOJHL | Lost quarter-final |
| 2007–08 | 48 | 25 | 21 | – | 2 | 187 | 191 | 52 | 6th GOJHL-W | Lost Conf. Quarter-final |
| 2008–09 | 52 | 28 | 19 | – | 5 | 184 | 170 | 61 | 5th GOJHL-W | Lost Conf. Quarter-final |
| 2009–10 | 50 | 7 | 38 | – | 5 | 128 | 276 | 19 | 8th GOJHL-W | Lost Conf. Quarter-final |
| 2010–11 | 51 | 26 | 21 | – | 4 | 183 | 162 | 56 | 6th GOJHL-W | Lost Conf. Quarterfinals, 3–4 (LaSalle) |
| 2011–12 | 51 | 30 | 17 | – | 4 | 214 | 163 | 64 | 2nd GOJHL-W | Lost Conf. Quarterfinals, 2–4 (Strathroy) |
| 2012–13 | 51 | 32 | 16 | – | 3 | 185 | 152 | 67 | 2nd GOJHL-W | Won Conf. Quarterfinals, 4–1 (Sarnia); Lost Conf. Semifinal, 1–4 (London) |
| 2013–14 | 49 | 37 | 10 | – | 2 | 232 | 120 | 76 | 1st GOJHL-W | Won Conf. Quarterfinals, 4–0 (St. Marys); Won Conf. Semifinal, 4–1 (London); Won Conf. Finals, 4–1 (Chatham); Lost Sutherland Cup Semifinals, 1–4 (St. Catharines) |
| 2014–15 | 49 | 38 | 9 | – | 2 | 210 | 130 | 78 | 1st GOJHL-W | Won Conf. Quarterfinals, 4–0 (Lambton Shores); Won Conf. Semifinal, 4–2 (London); Won Conf. Finals, 4–2 (LaSalle); Lost Sutherland Cup Semifinals, 1–4 (Caledonia) |
| 2015–16 | 50 | 41 | 8 | 1 | 0 | 200 | 95 | 83 | 1st of 9-W; 3rd of 26-GOJHL | Won Conf. Quarterfinals, 4–0 (St. Marys); Won Conf. Semifinals 4–2 (Chatham); Lost Conf. Finals 2–4 (London) |
| 2016–17 | 50 | 27 | 16 | 1 | 6 | 163 | 140 | 61 | 4th of 9-W; 12 of 27-GOJHL | Won Conf. Quarterfinals, 4–2 (Sarnia); Won Conf. Semifinals, 4–2 (LaSalle); Lost Conf. Finals, 1–4 (London) |
| 2017–18 | 50 | 31 | 11 | 5 | 3 | 202 | 142 | 70 | 2nd of 9-W; 7th of 26-GOJHL | Won Conf. Quarterfinals, 4–0 (Kings); Lost Conf. Semifinal 3–4 (Stars) |
| 2018–19 | 48 | 33 | 10 | 2 | 3 | 193 | 122 | 71 | 1st of 9 -W; 3rd of 26 GOJHL | Won Conf. Quarterfinals, 4–1 (Strathroy); Won Conf. Semifinals, 4–3 (Kings); Lost Conf Finals, 0–4 (London) |
| 2019–20 | 50 | 38 | 9 | 1 | 2 | 225 | 132 | 79 | 2nd of 9 -W; 3rd of 26 GOJHL | Won Conf. Quarterfinals, 4–0 (Kings); Incomplete Conf. Semifinals, 1–0 (Lincolns) 'Playoffs cancelled due to COVID-19 |
| 2020–21 | Season Lost due to COVID-19 pandemic | | | | | | | | | |
| 2021–22 | 48 | 36 | 12 | 0 | 0 | 194 | 119 | 72 | 1st of 9 -W; 3rd of 25 GOJHL | Won Conf. Quarterfinals, 4–0 (Strathroy); Won Conf. Semifinals, 4–2 (Lincolns); Lost Conf Finals, 2–4 (Chatham) |
| 2022–23 | 50 | 35 | 11 | 4 | 0 | 217 | 121 | 72 | 1st of 9 -W; 6th of 25 GOJHL | Won Conf. Quarterfinals, 4–0 (Sarnia); Won Conf. Semifinals, 4–0 (LaSalle); Won Conf Finals, 4–1 (Lincolns); Round Robin 2–2 (Hamilton)(Stratford) (Advance to finals); Won League Finals, 4–3 (Warriors) |
Ontario Junior Hockey League - Jr "A"
| 2023-24 | 56 | 34 | 14 | 5 | 3 | 209 | 139 | 76 | 3rd of 12-West; 4th of 24-OJHL | Won Conf. Quarterfinals, 4–0 (Raiders); Won Conf. Semifinals, 4–1 (Menace); Lost Conf Finals, 0-4 (Blues) |
| 2024-25 | 56 | 45 | 7 | 3 | 1 | 238 | 93 | 94 | 1st of 12-West; 2nd of 24-OJHL | Won Conf. Quarterfinals, 4–0 (Canucks); Won Conf. Semifinals, 4–0 (Jr. Sabres); Lost Conf Finals, 1-4 (Menace) |

== 2022–23 coaching staff ==
- General Manager: Justin Solcz
- Ass't General Manager: Matt Dumouchelle
- Head coach: Dale Mitchell
- Assistant coach: Kyle Quick
- Assistant coach: Kade McKibbin
- Goalie Coach: Matt Anthony
- Video coach: Garrett Fodor
- Trainer: Donald Mouck

== Sutherland Cup appearances ==
2023: Leamington Flyers defeated Stratford Warriors 4-games-to-3

== Clarence Schmalz Cup appearances ==
1972: Leamington Flyers defeated Cobourg Cougars 4-games-to-1
1980: Leamington Flyers defeated Bradford Blues 4-games-to-none

== Notable alumni ==
- Chris Allen
- Darren Banks
- T.J. Brodie
- Tim Gleason
- Zack Kassian
- Kris Manery
- Steve Ott
- Eric Reitz
- Charlie Stephens
- Tim Hrynewich
- Ryan Gagnier
- Colton O'Brien
- Tyler Wall
