= Steve Bancroft =

Canadian ice hockey player (born 1970)

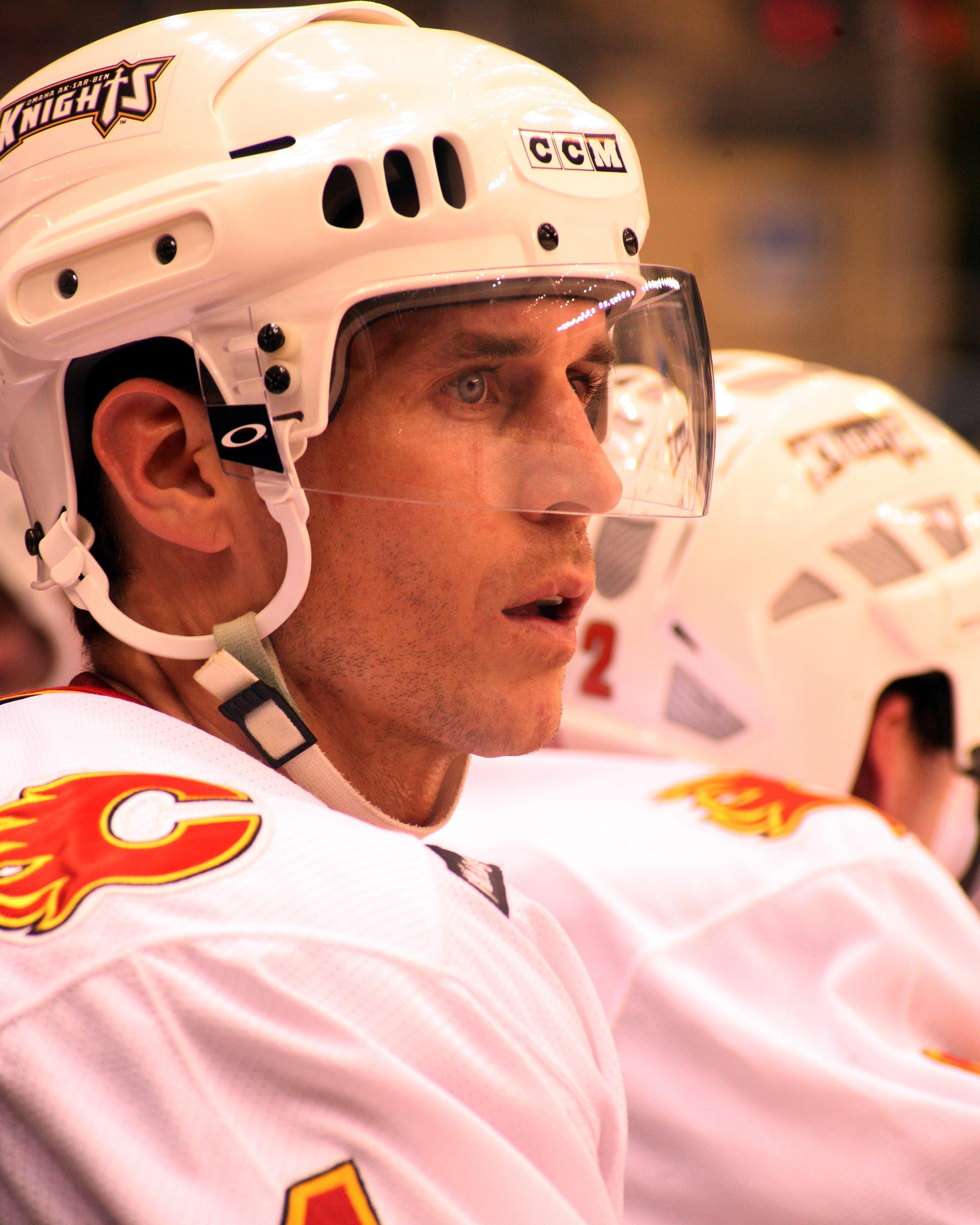
- Bancroft with the Omaha Ak-Sar-Ben Knights in 2006
- Born: October 6, 1970 (age 56) Toronto, Ontario, Canada
- Height: 6 ft 1 in (185 cm)
- Weight: 214 lb (97 kg; 15 st 4 lb)
- Position: Defence
- Shot: Left
- Played for: Chicago Blackhawks; San Jose Sharks
- NHL draft: 21st overall, 1989; Toronto Maple Leafs
- Playing career: 1990–2006

Steve Bancroft (born October 6, 1970) is a Canadian former professional ice hockey player. Selected 21st overall in the 1989 NHL entry draft by the Toronto Maple Leafs, he played in 6 NHL games with the Chicago Blackhawks and San Jose Sharks.

Bancroft grew up in the small Ontario community of Madoc, Ontario playing his minor hockey for the local Madoc Minor Hockey Association clubs from novice to bantam. He competed in several OMHA championship series before elevating to the Jr.C. level with his hometown Madoc Hurricanes in 1985–86. That same season, he also spent time playing at the Jr.B. level with the Trenton Golden Hawks.

The following year, Bancroft moved to St. Catharines, Ontario and played for the St. Catharines Falcons Jr. B team of the Golden Horseshoes League of the OHA.

Bancroft retired from professional hockey in 2006 and is now a real estate agent for Century 21 in Madoc, Ontario.

Bancroft's son, Dalton, played college ice hockey with Cornell.

== Career statistics ==
			Regular season					Playoffs
Season	Team	League	GP	G	A	Pts	PIM	GP	G	A	Pts	PIM
1985–86	Madoc Hurricanes	COJHL	7	1	0	1	21	—	—	—	—	—
1985–86	Trenton Bobcats	MetJHL	16	1	5	6	16	—	—	—	—	—
1986–87	St. Catharines Falcons	GHL	11	5	8	13	20	–	–	–	–	–
1987–88	Belleville Bulls	OHL	56	1	8	9	42	—	—	—	—	—
1988–89	Belleville Bulls	OHL	66	7	30	37	99	5	0	2	2	10
1989–90	Belleville Bulls	OHL	53	10	33	43	135	11	3	9	12	38
1990–91	Newmarket Saints	AHL	9	0	3	3	22	—	—	—	—	—
1990–91	Maine Mariners	AHL	53	2	12	14	46	2	0	0	0	2
1991–92	Indianapolis Ice	IHL	36	8	23	31	49	—	—	—	—	—
1991–92	Maine Mariners	AHL	26	1	3	4	45	—	—	—	—	—
1992–93	Indianapolis Ice	IHL	53	10	35	45	138	—	—	—	—	—
1992–93	Moncton Hawks	AHL	21	3	13	16	16	5	0	0	0	16
1992–93	Chicago Blackhawks	NHL	1	0	0	0	0	—	—	—	—	—
1993–94	Cleveland Lumberjacks	IHL	33	2	12	14	58	—	—	—	—	—
1994–95	Detroit Vipers	IHL	6	1	3	4	0	—	—	—	—	—
1994–95	Fort Wayne Komets	IHL	50	7	17	24	100	—	—	—	—	—
1994–95	St. John's Maple Leafs	AHL	4	2	0	2	2	5	0	3	3	8
1995–96	Los Angeles Ice Dogs	IHL	15	3	10	13	22	—	—	—	—	—
1995–96	Chicago Wolves	IHL	64	9	41	50	91	9	1	7	8	22
1996–97	Chicago Wolves	IHL	39	6	10	16	66	—	—	—	—	—
1996–97	Las Vegas Thunder	IHL	36	9	28	37	64	3	0	0	0	2
1997–98	Las Vegas Thunder	IHL	70	15	44	59	148	—	—	—	—	—
1997–98	Saint John Flames	AHL	9	0	4	4	12	19	2	11	13	30
1998–99	Saint John Flames	AHL	8	1	4	5	22	—	—	—	—	—
1998–99	Providence Bruins	AHL	62	7	34	41	78	15	0	6	6	28
1999–2000	Cincinnati Cyclones	IHL	39	6	14	20	37	—	—	—	—	—
1999–2000	Houston Aeros	IHL	37	2	18	20	47	10	2	6	8	40
2000–01	Kentucky Thoroughblades	AHL	80	23	50	73	162	3	0	2	2	8
2001–02	San Jose Sharks	NHL	5	0	1	1	2	—	—	—	—	—
2001–02	Cleveland Barons	AHL	72	6	38	44	226	—	—	—	—	—
2002–03	Worcester IceCats	AHL	21	4	6	10	32	—	—	—	—	—
2002–03	Binghamton Senators	AHL	29	1	11	12	40	14	0	0	0	12
2003–04	Binghamton Senators	AHL	77	7	16	23	131	2	0	0	0	2
2004–05	Augsburger Panther	DEL	44	4	12	16	103	1	0	0	0	0
2005–06	Omaha Ak-Sar-Ben Knights	AHL	75	3	16	19	114	—	—	—	—	—
AHL totals			546	60	210	270	948	65	2	22	24	106
IHL totals			478	78	255	333	820	22	3	13	16	64
NHL totals			6	0	1	1	2	—	—	—	—	—

Preceded by Rob Pearson	Toronto Maple Leafs first-round draft pick 1989	Succeeded by Drake Berehowsky
