= Strathroy Rockets =

- City: Strathroy, Ontario
- League: Greater Ontario Hockey League
- Conference: Western
- Founded: 1965
- Home arena: West Middlesex Memorial Arena
- Colours: Red, blue and white
- General manager: Andrew Ferlatte
- Head coach: Matt Bowes

Franchise history
- 1965–1972: Strathroy Rockets
- 1972–1975: Strathroy Falcons
- 1975–1994: Strathroy Blades
- 1994–present: Strathroy Rockets

The Strathroy Rockets are a junior ice hockey team based in Strathroy, Ontario, Canada. They play in the Western division of the Greater Ontario Hockey League.

== History ==
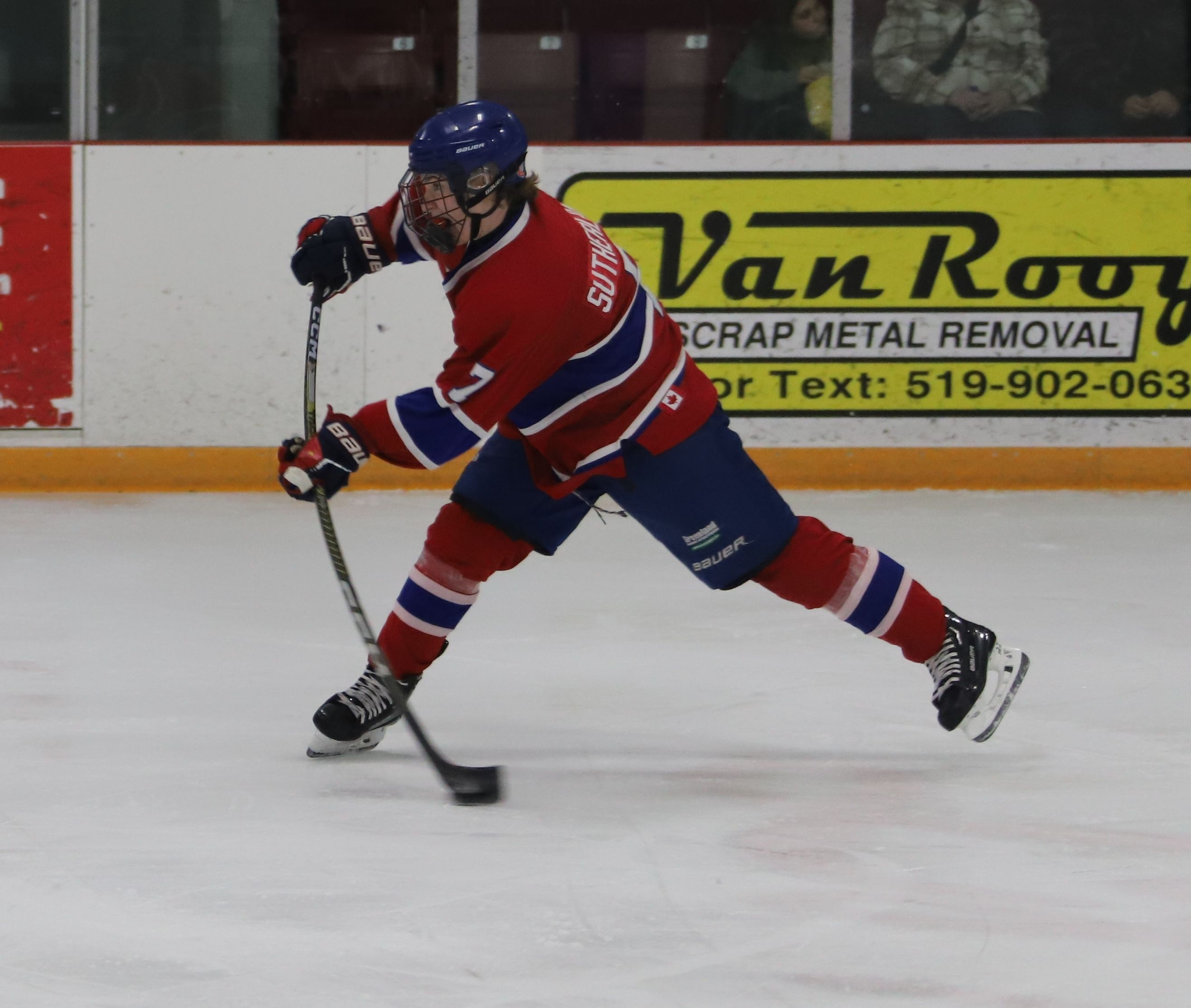
Rockets forward, Jimmy Sutherland (#7) shoot for a goal during 23/24 season.

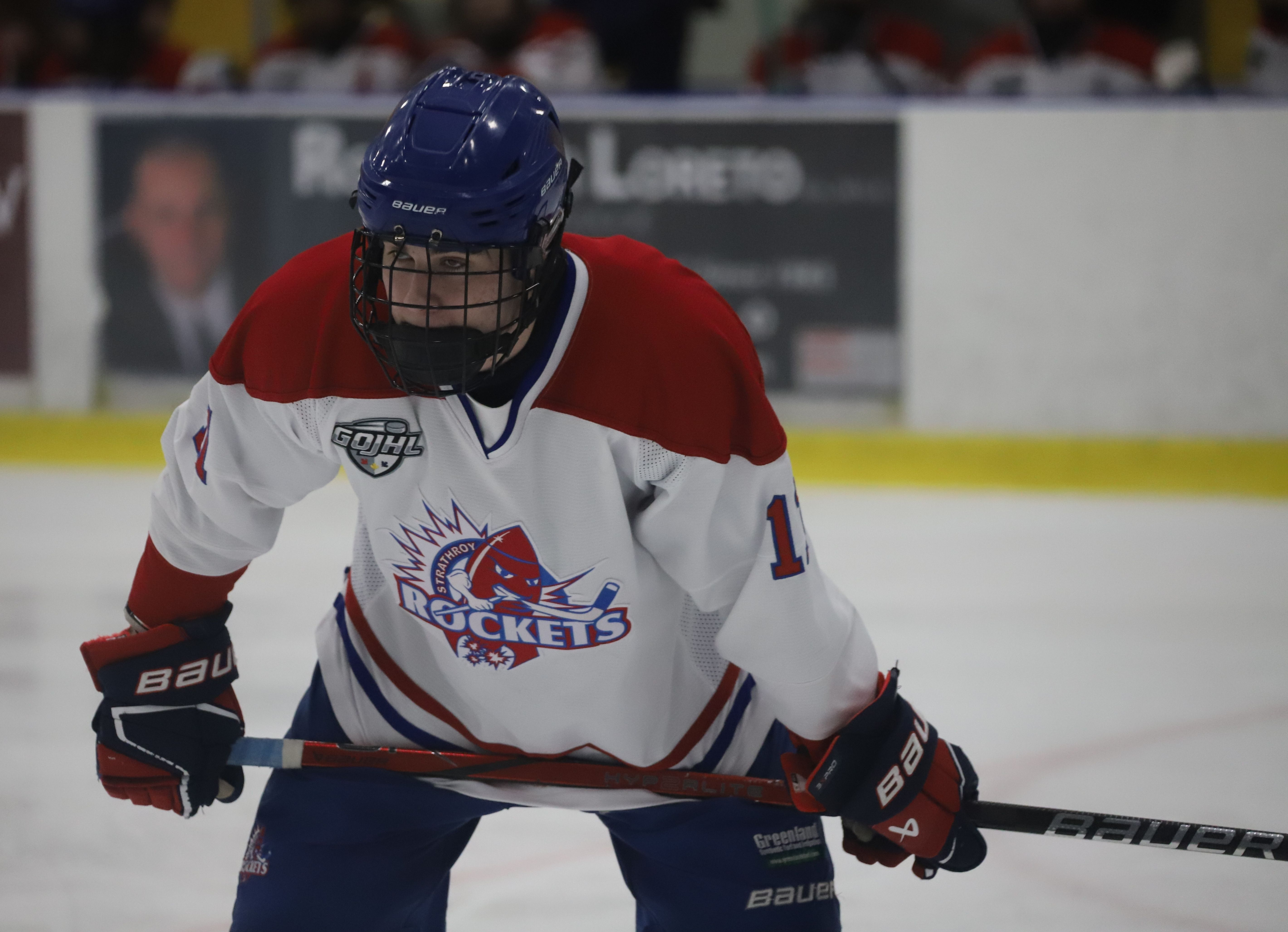
Windsor Spitfires prospect, Kyler Morgan sets up for draw.

In 1965, the Rockets joined the old Western Junior "B" league. When most of the league became the Western Junior A league in 1968, the Rockets were not invited. Instead, the team joined the Central "B" league for a year, before moving to the Western Junior B league in 1969, and ceased operations in 1972. The Falcons replaced the Rockets and moved to the Western Junior "D". The team became the Blades in 1975 rejoined the newly re-formed Western "B" league. In 1994, they once again became the Rockets and stayed in the Western "B" ever since.

The Rockets won the WOJHL title in 2006-07, defeating the Sarnia Blast in seven games. They were then defeated by the Cambridge WinterHawks in the Sutherland Cup final.

The Rockets were purchased by former NHL player Cory Conacher, and negotiated by Andrew Ferlatte. Cory appointed Andrew as the General Manager June 1st, 2024, Andrew became the first ever appointed General Manager of the Rockets in the modern era under private ownership.

The Strathroy Rockets unveiled a new, modern look December 13th 2025 in the GOHL's spotlight game against the Sarnia Legionnaires.

== 2026-27 coaching staff ==
- Owner - Cory Conacher
- General Manager - Andrew Ferlatte
- Head Coach - Matt Bowes
- Assistant Coach - Steven Santos
- Assistant Coach - Parker Smith
- Goalie Coach - Mike Greguol
- Trainer - Mike Brooks

== Season-by-season results ==
| Season | GP | W | L | T | OTL | GF | GA | P | Results | Playoffs |
| 1965-66 | 40 | 12 | 27 | 1 | - | 181 | 238 | 25 | 5th WOJBHL | |
| 1966-67 | 40 | 19 | 19 | 2 | - | 226 | 212 | 40 | 4th WOJBHL | |
| 1967-68 | 52 | 23 | 26 | 3 | - | 236 | 235 | 49 | 4th WOJBHL | |
| 1968-69 | 36 | 21 | 20 | 5 | - | 203 | 163 | 47 | 2nd CJBHL | Won League, Lost SC |
| 1969-70 | 36 | 7 | 25 | 4 | - | 128 | 186 | 18 | 5th WOJHL | |
| 1970-71 | 42 | 6 | 31 | 5 | - | 138 | 276 | 17 | 5th WOJHL | |
| 1971-72 | Statistics Not Available | | | | | | | | | |
| 1972-73 | 32 | 16 | 14 | 2 | - | 205 | 195 | 34 | 4th WJDHL | |
| 1973-74 | 34 | 17 | 13 | 4 | - | 229 | 196 | 38 | 4th WJDHL | |
| 1974-75 | 32 | 7 | 22 | 3 | - | 167 | 255 | 17 | 8th WJDHL | |
| 1975-76 | 40 | 4 | 32 | 4 | - | 112 | 274 | 12 | 7th WOJHL | |
| 1976-77 | 40 | 17 | 15 | 8 | - | 200 | 207 | 42 | 3rd WOJHL | |
| 1977-78 | 39 | 13 | 25 | 1 | - | 167 | 220 | 27 | 5th WOJHL | |
| 1978-79 | 42 | 29 | 10 | 3 | - | 286 | 188 | 61 | 2nd WOJHL | Lost Final |
| 1979-80 | 42 | 27 | 14 | 1 | - | 232 | 163 | 55 | 4th WOJHL | |
| 1980-81 | 42 | 19 | 18 | 5 | - | 219 | 209 | 43 | 5th WOJHL | |
| 1981-82 | 42 | 13 | 18 | 11 | - | 190 | 213 | 37 | 4th WOJHL | |
| 1982-83 | 42 | 25 | 13 | 4 | - | 229 | 203 | 54 | 2nd WOJHL | |
| 1983-84 | 48 | 21 | 21 | 6 | - | 252 | 253 | 48 | 6th WOJHL | |
| 1984-85 | 48 | 8 | 33 | 7 | - | 191 | 314 | 23 | 7th WOJHL | |
| 1985-86 | 42 | 13 | 21 | 8 | - | 201 | 250 | 34 | 6th WOJHL | |
| 1986-87 | 42 | 12 | 26 | 4 | - | 192 | 278 | 28 | 6th WOJHL | |
| 1987-88 | 42 | 16 | 25 | 2 | 0 | 190 | 245 | 34 | 6th WOJHL | |
| 1988-89 | 40 | 26 | 12 | 2 | 0 | 249 | 193 | 54 | 3rd WOJHL | |
| 1989-90 | 40 | 8 | 27 | 3 | 2 | 158 | 287 | 21 | 8th WOJHL | |
| 1990-91 | 48 | 17 | 25 | 2 | 4 | 209 | 250 | 40 | 6th WOJHL | |
| 1991-92 | 48 | 19 | 23 | 2 | 4 | 194 | 228 | 44 | 3rd WOJHL East | |
| 1992-93 | 52 | 4 | 45 | 0 | 3 | - | - | 11 | 5th WOJHL East | |
| 1993-94 | 50 | 13 | 32 | 5 | 0 | 193 | 269 | 31 | 4th WOJHL East | |
| 1994-95 | 52 | 8 | 40 | 0 | 4 | 166 | 358 | 20 | 5th WOJHL East | |
| 1995-96 | 52 | 26 | 21 | 4 | 1 | 252 | 213 | 57 | 4th WOJHL East | |
| 1996-97 | 52 | 34 | 13 | 3 | 2 | 273 | 192 | 73 | 1st WOJHL East | Won League |
| 1997-98 | 52 | 28 | 22 | 1 | 1 | 265 | 224 | 58 | 2nd WOJHL East | |
| 1998-99 | 52 | 26 | 22 | 0 | 4 | 232 | 235 | 56 | 2nd WOJHL East | |
| 1999-00 | 54 | 30 | 20 | 0 | 4 | 269 | 225 | 64 | 5th GOHL | Lost Final |
| 2000-01 | 54 | 21 | 26 | 3 | 4 | 214 | 217 | 49 | 7th GOHL | |
| 2001-02 | 54 | 32 | 18 | 1 | 3 | 269 | 232 | 68 | 5th WOJHL | |
| 2002-03 | 48 | 12 | 33 | 2 | 1 | 146 | 244 | 27 | 8th WOJHL | |
| 2003-04 | 48 | 11 | 34 | 3 | 0 | 130 | 232 | 25 | 9th WOJHL | |
| 2004-05 | 48 | 17 | 30 | 1 | 0 | 140 | 205 | 35 | 8th WOJHL | |
| 2005-06 | 48 | 25 | 10 | 3 | 10 | 165 | 152 | 63 | 3rd WOJHL | |
| 2006-07 | 48 | 33 | 12 | - | 3 | 206 | 153 | 69 | 1st WOJHL | Won League, Lost SC |
| 2007-08 | 48 | 27 | 17 | - | 4 | 206 | 171 | 58 | 4th GOJHL-W | Lost Conf. QF |
| 2008-09 | 52 | 33 | 15 | - | 4 | 225 | 140 | 70 | 4th GOJHL-W | Lost Conf. SF |
| 2009-10 | 50 | 36 | 13 | - | 1 | 244 | 152 | 73 | 2nd GOJHL-W | Lost Conf. QF |
| 2010-11 | 51 | 37 | 10 | - | 4 | 258 | 150 | 78 | 1st GOJHL-W | Lost Conf. SF |
| 2011-12 | 51 | 25 | 23 | - | 3 | 218 | 219 | 53 | 7th GOJHL-W | Lost Conf. Final |
| 2012-13 | 51 | 25 | 22 | - | 4 | 165 | 176 | 54 | 6th GOJHL-W | Lost Conf. SF |
| 2013-14 | 49 | 25 | 18 | - | 6 | 184 | 167 | 56 | 6th GOJHL-W | Lost Conf. QF |
| 2014-15 | 49 | 25 | 22 | - | 2 | 183 | 162 | 52 | 5th GOJHL-W | Lost Conf Quarter, 4-0 (Vipers) |
| 2015-16 | 50 | 12 | 24 | 4 | 10 | 144 | 204 | 38 | 7th of 9-W; 20th of 26 | Lost Conf Quarter, 4-1 (Nationals) |
| 2016-17 | 50 | 16 | 27 | 2 | 5 | 167 | 219 | 39 | 8th of 9-W; 20th of 26 | Lost Conf Quarter, 4-0 (Vipers) |
| 2017-18 | 50 | 11 | 32 | 2 | 5 | 127 | 214 | 29 | 8th of 9-W; 23rd of 26 | Lost Conf Quarter, 4-0 (Nationals) |
| 2018-19 | 48 | 19 | 28 | 1 | 0 | 143 | 262 | 39 | 8th of 9-W; 19th of 26 | Lost Conf Quarter, 4-1 (Flyers) |
| 2019-20 | 50 | 19 | 26 | 3 | 2 | 148 | 182 | 43 | 6th of 9-W; 17th of 25 | Lost Conf Quarter, 1-4 (Lincolns) |
| 2020-21 | Season lost due to covid-19 pandemic | | | | | | | | | |
| 2021-22 | 48 | 13 | 29 | 2 | 4 | 130 | 187 | 32 | 8th of 9-W; 20th of 25 | Lost Conf Quarter, 0-4 (Flyers) |
| 2022-23 | 50 | 22 | 19 | 8 | 1 | 178 | 196 | 53 | 6th of 9-W; 20th of 25 | Lost Conf Quarter, 0-4 (Lincolns) |
| 2023-24 | 50 | 33 | 12 | 3 | 2 | 206 | 145 | 53 | 3rd of 8-W; 20th of 23 | Won Conf Quarter, 4-1 (Stars); Lost Conf Quarter, 0-4 (Lincolns) |
| 2024-25 | 50 | 24 | 20 | 4 | 2 | 152 | 172 | 54 | 9th of 12-West; 15th of 23 | Did Not Qualify for Post Season |
| 2025-26 | 50 | 26 | 21 | 2 | 1 | 185 | 183 | 54 | 6th of 12-West; 11th of 23 | Lost Conf Quarter, 1-4 (Lincolns) |

== Sutherland Cup appearances ==
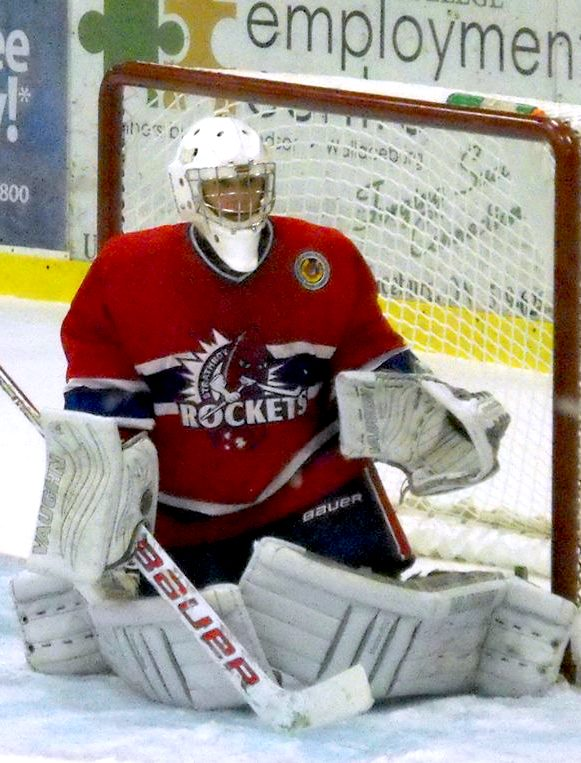
Rockets' goalie 2013-14 season, in road jersey

1969: Markham Waxers defeated Strathroy Rockets 4 games to 2
2007: Cambridge Winterhawks defeated Strathroy Rockets 4 games to none

== Notable alumni ==
- Brian Campbell
- Jeff Carter
- Doug Crossman
- Dale Hunter
- Jared Keeso (actor)
- Craig MacTavish
- Andy McDonald
- Patrick O'Sullivan
- Mike Stapleton
- Don Van Massenhoven
- Jason Williams

== Other ==
- Rockets Webpage
- GOJHL Webpage
