= Niagara Falls Canucks =

- City: Niagara Falls, Ontario, Canada
- League: Ontario Junior Hockey League
- Conference: Western
- Founded: c. 1971
- Home arena: Gale Centre
- Colours: Black, Red, and White
- Owner: Frank Pietrangelo
- General manager: Jim Davidson
- Head coach: Frank Pietrangelo

Franchise history
- 1971–1992: Niagara Falls Canucks
- 1992–1994: Niagara Falls Devils
- 1994-Present: Niagara Falls Canucks

The Niagara Falls Canucks are a junior ice hockey team based in Niagara Falls, Ontario, Canada. They play in the Ontario Junior Hockey League which they joined in 2023. For most of the team's history they had played in the Golden Horseshoe division of the Greater Ontario Junior Hockey League until leaving for the OJHL.

== History ==
The Canucks were the successor to the Stamford Hornets in the Niagara District Junior B Hockey League. Stamford took a leave of absence in 1970-71, and the Canucks commenced play in the 1971-72 season. When the league folded in 1979, the Canucks moved to the Golden Horseshoe "B". For a short time in the 1990s, the teams was known as the Devils.

During the 2006 Playoffs, the Canucks won the GHJHL Championship, but ended up falling to the Midwestern Junior B Hockey League's Cambridge Winterhawks 4-games-to-1 in the Sutherland Cup final. The current captain of the Canucks is Ben Evans.

== Current ==
The Niagara Falls Canucks relocated from Niagara Falls Memorial Arena to the Gale Centre prior to the 2011 season. Niagara Falls native Cam McLean was named captain during the grand opening of the new facility.

== Move to the OJHL ==
On June 26, 2023, it was announced that the Canucks franchise had been approved to join the Junior "A" level Ontario Junior Hockey League as an expansion franchise. As a result the Canucks will leave the GOJHL after over 50 years at the Junior "B" level. The Canucks were the second former GOJHL franchise to join OJHL in 2023 after the Leamington Flyers announced their move to the Junior "A" ranks in May of that year.

== Season-by-season results ==
Season	GP	W	L	T	OTL	GF	GA	P	Results	Playoffs
1971–72	35	13	15	7	-	172	191	33	5th NDJBHL	
1972–73	35	19	11	5	-	231	159	43	2nd NDJBHL	
1973–74	35	17	16	2	-	190	169	36	4th NDJBHL	
1974–75	35	25	6	4	-	262	167	54	1st NDJBHL	won league
1975–76	40	28	9	3	-	225	147	59	1st NDJBHL	won league
1976–77	40	29	8	3	-	337	165	61	2nd NDJBHL	won league
1977–78	40	25	14	1	-	259	193	51	2nd NDJBHL	Lost final
1978–79	39	27	7	5	-	--	--	59	1st NDJBHL	Lost final
1979–80	44	30	11	3	-	257	185	63	2nd GHJHL	
1980–81	42	26	12	4	-	295	206	56	2nd GHJHL	
1981–82	36	20	12	4	-	-	-	44	2nd GHJHL	
1982–83	42	15	18	9	-	215	239	39	6th GHJHL	
1983–84	42	28	9	5	-	296	192	61	1st GHJHL	Lost final
1984–85	42	24	13	5	-	268	208	53	2nd GHJHL	Lost final
1985–86	40	19	16	5	-	236	215	43	5th GHJHL	
1986–87	42	29	8	5	-	322	215	63	1st GHJHL	Won League
1987–88	42	35	5	2	-	394	224	72	1st GHJHL	Won League
1988–89	42	27	10	5	-	279	209	59	1st GHJHL	Won League
1989–90	48	30	17	0	1	309	278	61	3rd GHJHL	
1990–91	42	4	37	1	0	164	307	9	8th GHJHL	
1991–92	42	7	34	1	0	137	303	15	8th GHJHL	
1992–93	42	15	19	2	6	190	207	38	5th GHJHL	
1993–94	40	23	14	2	1	248	210	49	3rd GHJHL	
1994–95	42	34	4	4	1	319	188	73	1st GHJHL	Won League
1995–96	42	33	5	3	1	283	169	70	1st GHJHL	Won League, won Sutherland Cup
1996–97	41	29	7	3	2	298	181	65	2nd GHJHL	
1997–98	49	43	3	1	2	379	165	89	1st GHJHL	Won League, won Sutherland Cup
1998–99	48	40	3	3	2	238	133	85	1st GHJHL	Lost final
1999–00	48	29	17	2	0	219	152	60	4th GHJHL	
2000–01	48	33	9	6	0	254	161	72	1st GHJHL	
2001–02	48	38	10	0	0	234	136	76	1st GHJHL	Won League
2002–03	48	31	12	4	1	232	156	67	2nd GHJHL	Lost final
2003–04	48	36	3	8	1	206	109	81	1st GHJHL	Lost final
2004–05	48	26	16	5	1	206	169	58	2nd GHJHL	Lost final
2005–06	49	36	8	2	3	300	158	77	1st GHJHL	Won League
2006–07	49	37	10	1	1	261	178	76	1st GHJHL	Lost final
2007–08	49	29	15	5	0	207	178	63	2nd GOJHL-GH	Lost semi-final
2008–09	52	25	22	-	5	240	222	55	4th GOJHL-GH	Lost Conf. Final
2009–10	51	28	16	-	7	205	202	63	4th GOJHL-GH	Lost Conf. Semi-final
2010–11	51	38	9	-	4	280	164	80	1st GOJHL-GH	Lost final
2011–12	51	39	8	-	4	231	142	82	2nd GOJHL-GH	
2012–13	51	30	18	-	3	226	175	63	4th GOJHL-GH	Lost Conf. Quarter-final
2013–14	49	26	22	-	1	210	194	53	6th GOJHL-GH	
2014–15	49	24	20	-	5	172	181	53	5th GOJHL-GH	Lost Conf. Quarter-final, 0-4 (Avalanche)
2015-16	50	26	20	2	2	194	176	56	4th of 8-GH; 13th of 26-GOJHL	Won Conf. Quarter-final, 4-1 (Meteors); Lost Conf. Semifinals, 0-4 (Corvairs)
2016-17	50	33	13	0	4	252	131	70	3rd of 9-GH; 8th of 27-GOJHL	Won Conf. Quarter-final, 4-0 (Jr. Canadians); Lost Conf. Semifinals, 2-4 (Falcons)
2017-18	50	32	14	0	4	210	194	68	4th of 9-GH; 8th of 26-GOJHL	Won Conf. Quarter-final, 4-0 (Blackhawks); Lost Conf. Semifinal 1-4 (Corvairs)
2018-19	48	41	6	0	1	282	126	83	1st of 9-GH; 1st of 25-GOJHL	Won Conf. Quarter-final, 4-0 (Regals); Won Conf. Semifinal 4-0 (Panthers); Won Conf Finals 4-3 (Falcons); Conference champions Lost League Semi 2-4 (Siskins
2019-20	50	34	12	0	4	224	146	72	2nd of 9-GH; 6th of 26-GOJHL	Won Conf. Quarter-final, 4-1 (Meteors); Incomplete Conf. Semifinal 2-3 (Falcons)
2020–21	Season lost due to Covid-19									
2021-22	28	7	37	3	1	64	169	18	8 of 8-GH; 25th of 25-GOJHL	Lost Conf. Quarter-final, 0-4 (Kilty B's)
2022-23	50	21	25	3	1	156	156	46	6 of 8-GH; 19th of 25-GOJHL	Lost Conf. Quarter-final, 2-4 (Meteors)
Ontario Junior Hockey League - Jr "A"
2023-24	56	18	37	0	1	170	245	37	10 of 12-West; 19th of 24-OJHL	Did not qualify for Post Season
2024-25	56	23	27	0	6	188	203	52	8th of 12-West; 16th of 24-OJHL	Lost West Conf Quarterfinals 0-4 (Flyers)

== Sutherland Cup appearances ==
1987: St. Thomas Stars defeated Niagara Falls Canucks 4-games-to-none
1989: St. Michael's Buzzers defeated Niagara Falls Canucks 4-games-to-1
1996: Niagara Falls Canucks defeated St. Thomas Stars 4-games-to-2
1998: Niagara Falls Canucks defeated Elmira Sugar Kings 4-games-to-3
2006: Cambridge Winterhawks defeated Niagara Falls Canucks 4-games-to-1
2011: Elmira Sugar Kings defeated Niagara Falls Canucks 4-games-to-1
