= Cambridge Winter Hawks =

- City: Cambridge, Ontario, Canada
- League: Greater Ontario Junior Hockey League
- Division: Mid-Western
- Operated: 1982-2017
- Home arena: Galt Arena Gardens
- Colours: Black, Red, and White
- Owner: Joe Machado
- General manager: vacant
- Head coach: vacant
- Affiliates: Ayr Centennials (PJHL)

The Cambridge Winter Hawks were a Canadian junior ice hockey team based in Cambridge, Ontario, Canada. They played in the Mid-Western division of the Greater Ontario Junior Hockey League.

== History ==
Created in 1982, the team was made to replace the last Cambridge team that was bought out by the Guelph Platers and moved out of town. Their first season was in the OHA Junior "A" League. The Winter Hawks have been a charter member of the Midwestern "B" since 1983, and are currently the 2006 Sutherland Cup Champions, defeating the Niagara Falls Canucks; they also repeated as 2007 Sutherland Cup champions.

The Winter Hawks have applied but were denied to move up to the Junior A Ontario Junior Hockey League for the 2013-14 season.

In 2017 the Cambridge Winter Hawks announced they were parting ways with OHA (but not Hockey Canada) and emphasized that they would no longer be of the GOJHL. Options being explored included finding a Junior A league, creating their own Jr. A league, but are not considering joining an outlaw league (i.e. GMHL).

== Season-by-season record ==
Season	GP	W	L	T	OTL	GF	GA	P	Results	Playoffs
1982-83	48	22	22	4	-	261	261	48	5th OJHL	
1983-84	42	24	18	0	-	210	202	48	3rd MWJBHL	Lost quarter-final
1984-85	42	26	16	0	-	245	224	52	3rd MWJBHL	Lost semi-final
1985-86	40	11	29	0	-	188	279	22	5th MWJBHL	Lost quarter-final
1986-87	42	8	34	0	-	155	341	16	6th MWJBHL	Lost quarter-final
1987-88	48	2	46	0	-	117	352	4	9th MWJBHL	DNQ
1988-89	48	18	29	1	-	196	258	37	7th MWJBHL	Lost quarter-final
1989-90	48	13	33	2	-	232	340	28	7th MWJBHL	Lost quarter-final
1990-91	48	33	15	0	-	248	204	66	2nd MWJBHL	Lost semi-final
1991-92	48	15	29	4	-	179	265	34	6th MWJBHL	Lost quarter-final
1992-93	48	7	40	1	-	179	363	15	9th MWJBHL	DNQ
1993-94	48	32	13	3	-	256	177	67	2nd MWJBHL	Lost final
1994-95	48	28	16	4	-	224	175	60	3rd MWJBHL	Lost semi-final
1995-96	48	28	15	5	-	261	197	61	3rd MWJBHL	Lost quarter-final
1996-97	48	29	15	4	-	248	169	62	4th MWJBHL	Lost quarter-final
1997-98	48	17	27	4	-	170	201	38	7th MWJBHL	Lost quarter-final
1998-99	48	32	14	2	-	229	153	66	2nd MWJBHL	Lost final
1999-00	48	33	10	5	-	248	113	71	2nd MWJBHL	Won League, won Sutherland Cup
2000-01	48	25	17	6	-	210	185	56	5th MWJBHL	Lost final
2001-02	48	32	11	5	-	255	159	69	3rd MWJBHL	
2002-03	48	29	15	4	2	232	159	64	3rd MWJBHL	
2003-04	48	27	17	4	0	216	164	58	4th MWJBHL	
2004-05	48	28	11	4	5	213	141	65	3rd MWJBHL	
2005-06	48	38	9	1	-	259	145	77	1st MWJBHL	Won League, won Sutherland Cup
2006-07	48	36	8	3	1	255	139	76	1st MWJBHL	Won League, won Sutherland Cup
2007-08	48	25	14	7	2	174	144	59	3rd GOJHL-MW	Lost final
2008-09	52	24	22	-	6	207	202	54	6th GOJHL-MW	Lost quarter-final
2009-10	51	25	21	-	5	202	215	55	4th GOJHL-MW	Lost Conf. QF
2010-11	51	20	28	-	3	196	229	43	7th GOJHL-MW	Lost Conf. QF
2011-12	51	30	19	-	2	206	163	62	4th GOJHL-MW	
2012-13	51	33	14	-	4	195	133	70	2nd GOJHL-MW Won Cherrey Cup	Lost Suthy Final
2013-14	49	26	18	-	5	166	148	57	5th GOJHL-MW	Lost Conf. QF
2014-15	49	24	20	-	5	148	147	53	6th GOJHL-MW	Lost Conf. Quarter-final, 1-4 (Cullitons)
2015-16	50	10	35	1	4	129	203	25	9th of 9-MW; 23rd of 26-GOJHL	DNQ
2016-17	50	29	19	0	2	173	149	60	5th of 9-MW; 13th of 27-GOJHL	Lost Conf. Quarters, 2-4 (Siskins)

=== Playoffs ===
OJHL Years

- 1983 Lost quarter-final

North York Rangers defeated Cambridge Winterhawks 4-games-to-none

== Sutherland Cup championships ==
2000: Cambridge Winter Hawks defeated St. Catharines Falcons 4-games-to-none
2006: Cambridge Winter Hawks defeated Niagara Falls Canucks 4-games-to-1
2007: Cambridge Winter Hawks defeated Strathroy Rockets 4-games-to-none
2013: London Nationals defeated Cambridge Winter Hawks 4-games-to-3

== Notable alumni ==
- Tim Brent
- John Cullen
- Jake Dotchin
- Jet Greaves
- Todd Harvey
- Jody Hull
- Bryan Little
- Kirk Maltby
- Marty Turco
- Scott Walker
