= St. Catharines Falcons (1968) =

- City: St. Catharines, Ontario, Canada
- League: Greater Ontario Hockey League
- Division: Golden Horseshoe
- Founded: 1968
- Colours: Red and White
- General manager: Zack Schipper
- Head coach: Tyler Bielby
- Affiliates: Niagara IceDogs (OHL)

Championships
- Playoff championships: 2012 Sutherland Cup 2022 Sutherland Cup

The St. Catharines Falcons are a junior ice hockey team based in St. Catharines, Ontario, Canada. They play in the Eastern conference of the Greater Ontario Hockey League. The Falcons play their home games inside Seymour Hannah 4-pad in Western Hill St. Catharines.

== History ==
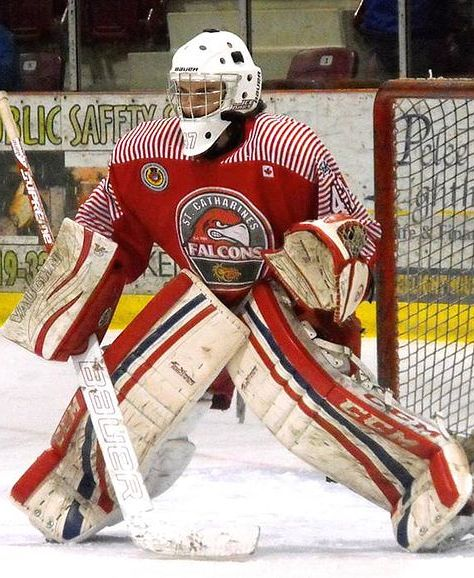
Jon D'Ilario during the 2014 playoffs.

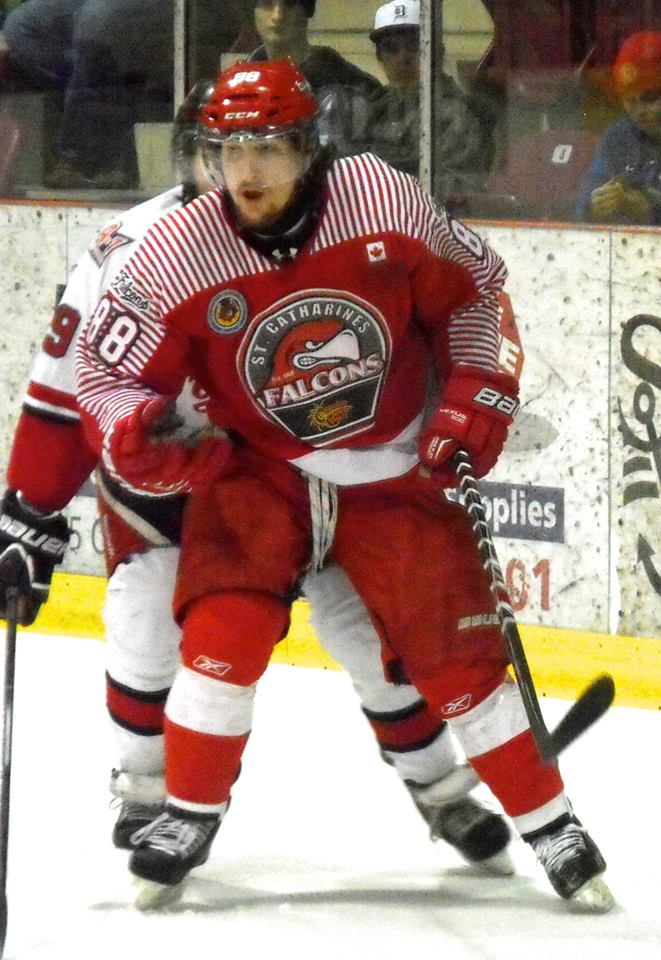
Mark Rodgers during the 2014 playoffs.

The current Falcons franchise originated in 1968. The league entered the Niagara District Junior B Hockey League that same year. The Niagara "B" split with several teams, including St.Catharines, forming the Golden Horseshoe Junior Hockey League in 1974. The Falcons have competed every year in the league since 1968.

In 2012, the Falcons attempted to win the Sutherland Cup for the first time in six tries. They defeated the Brantford Eagles 4-games-to-2 to clinch their first ever OHA Junior B championship.

The 2013-14 Falcons had won the 2013-14 Golden Horseshoe regular season crown with the best record by a Junior B team since the 1980s (45-3-1), but were caught with too many imports against the Caledonia Corvairs and Welland Jr. Canadians. Due to the protest by those two teams to the Ontario Hockey Association, the Falcons were stripped of the two victories, which slipped them back to second place in the standings (43-5-1) and allowed Caledonia a superior record (45-3-1) and playoff seed.

The Falcons won their franchise's second Sutherland Cup in the 2021-22 season after a dominating playoff run. The Falcons swept the first two rounds against the Pelham Panthers and Caledonia Corvairs, outscoring their opponents 40-11 with three consecutive shutouts. In the conference finals the Falcons defeated the Hamilton Kilty B's in a competitive series including a double overtime thriller and a defensive 1-0 battle to close out the series on home ice for the Falcons. The Falcons moved on to the re-vamped Sutherland Cup playoffs to face the Cambridge Redhawks (Midwest Conference) and the Chatham Maroons (Western Conference) in a home-and-home round robin tournament. After defeating Chatham 3-2 (OT) and 5-1 in the first two games, the Falcons lost their third and only game on home ice in the playoffs 4-3 in overtime but bounced back to beat the Redhawks 3-2 to finish the round robin with a 3-0-1 record, good enough for first place. In the Sutherland Cup Final, the Falcons defeated Chatham 6-2 on home ice at the Jack Gatecliff Memorial Arena, which would be the final game played in the historic arena's history. With a chance to win their second Sutherland Cup in franchise history, the Falcons defeated the Maroons 8-2 in front of a sold out crowd of 2300 in the Chatham Memorial Arena and successfully captured the Sutherland Cup.

== Notable games ==
On March 26, 2006, in Game 6 of the semi-finals against the Thorold Blackhawks, the St. Catharines Falcons played a four-overtime game. If the Falcons had won they would have played game 7 on the same day game 6 ended.

On May 4, 2012, the St. Catharines Falcons defeated the Brantford Golden Eagles to capture the franchises 1st Sutherland Cup Championship

On March 23, 2016, the St. Catharines Falcons played the longest game in GOJHL and GOJHL Playoff history against the Ancaster Avalanche. The game included four overtimes and lasted 131 minutes and five seconds. The Avalanche defeated the Falcons 3-2

On May 29, 2022, the St. Catharines Falcons defeated the Chatham Maroons to capture the franchises 2nd Sutherland Cup Championship

== Season-by-season results ==
Season	GP	W	L	T	OTL	GF	GA	P	Results	Playoffs
1968-69	36	15	15	5	-	154	136	35	5th NDJHL	
1969-70	36	9	19	8	-	136	170	26	6th NDJHL	
1970-71	36	28	5	3	-	231	124	59	1st NDJHL	
1971-72	35	28	5	2	-	255	119	56	1st NDJHL	Won League
1972-73	35	18	13	4	-	158	146	40	4th NDJHL	
1973-74	35	22	8	5	-	217	137	49	3rd NDJHL	
1974-75	40	22	14	4	-	248	210	48	4th GHJHL	Lost final
1975-76	40	28	7	5	-	291	209	61	1st GHJHL	Won League
1976-77	32	19	7	6	-	235	147	44	1st GHJHL	Won League
1977-78	40	26	9	5	-	285	167	57	1st GHJHL	Won League
1978-79	42	35	5	2	-	322	155	72	1st GHJHL	Won League
1979-80	44	27	13	4	-	296	234	58	4th GHJHL	Lost final
1980-81	42	36	2	4	-	308	135	76	1st GHJHL	Won League
1981-82	36	20	9	7	-	233	179	47	1st GHJHL	Won League
1982-83	42	26	12	4	-	261	192	56	1st GHJHL	Lost final
1983-84	42	22	11	9	-	246	200	53	3rd GHJHL	
1984-85	42	30	4	8	-	274	154	68	1st GHJHL	Won League
1985-86	40	23	10	7	-	268	188	53	2nd GHJHL	Won League
1986-87	42	25	11	6	-	231	171	56	3rd GHJHL	
1987-88	42	17	20	5	-	241	233	39	4th GHJHL	
1988-89	42	24	14	4	-	231	200	52	3rd GHJHL	
1989-90	48	40	6	0	2	362	188	82	1st GHJHL	Won League
1990-91	42	26	13	2	1	282	186	55	3rd GHJHL	
1991-92	42	27	12	2	1	296	194	57	2nd GHJHL	Won League
1992-93	42	27	13	1	1	272	194	56	3rd GHJHL	
1993-94	40	34	6	0	0	350	153	68	1st GHJHL	Won League
1994-95	42	22	16	4	4	232	194	52	3rd GHJHL	Lost final
1995-96	50	33	14	3	0	224	171	69	3rd GHJHL	Lost final
1996-97	42	30	10	1	1	276	169	62	3rd GHJHL	Won League
1997-98	49	30	13	5	1	248	169	66	2nd GHJHL	Lost final
1998-99	48	31	14	0	3	212	140	65	2nd GHJHL	Won League
1999-00	48	31	12	4	1	215	130	67	2nd GHJHL	Won League
2000-01	48	12	35	1	0	149	266	25	7th GHJHL	
2001-02	47	10	29	3	5	165	248	28	6th GHJHL	
2002-03	48	21	24	3	0	163	187	45	5th GHJHL	
2003-04	48	16	30	2	0	126	179	34	5th GHJHL	
2004-05	48	26	18	3	1	179	139	56	3rd GHJHL	
2005-06	49	33	13	2	1	220	167	69	2nd GHJHL	Lost semi-final
2006-07	49	34	11	2	2	278	183	72	2nd GHJHL	Won League
2007-08	49	28	14	5	2	208	158	63	3rd GOJHL-GH	Lost Conf. Final
2008-09	52	36	9	-	7	261	150	79	1st GOJHL-GH	
2009-10	51	38	8	-	5	280	146	81	1st GOJHL-GH	Lost Conf. Final
2010-11	51	34	13	-	4	218	136	72	3rd GOJHL-GH	Lost Conf. SF
2011-12	51	40	9	-	2	257	117	82	1st GOJHL-GH	Won League
2012-13	51	39	8	-	4	298	131	82	1st GOJHL-GH	Lost Round Robin SF
2013-14	49	43	5	-	1	253	128	87	2nd GOJHL-GH	Lost Conf. Final
2014-15	49	31	13	-	5	222	130	67	2nd GOJHL-GH	Won Conf. Quarter-finals, 4-1 (Blackhawks); Won Conf. Semi-finals, 4-1 (Jr. Canadians); Lost Conf. Finals 1-4 (Corvairs)
2015-16	50	33	12	2	3	212	121	71	2nd of 8-GH; 5th of 26 GOJHL	Won Conf. Quarter-finals, 4-1 (Jr. Canadians); Won Conf. Semi-finals, 4-2 (Avalanche); Lost Conf. Finals 0-4 (Corvairs)
2016-17	50	40	7	0	3	289	101	83	2nd of 9-GH; 3rd of 27 GOJHL	Won Conf. Quarter-finals, 4-0 (Panthers); Won Conf. Semifinals, 4-2 (Canucks); Lost Conf. Finals 2-4 (Corvairs)
2017-18	50	38	8	1	3	227	116	80	2nd of 9-GH; 3rd of 26 GOJHL	Won Conf. Quarter-finals, 4-0 (Panthers); Won Conf. Semifinals 4-3 (Jr. Canadians); Lost Conf. Finals 0-4 (Corvairs)
2018-19	47	39	6	1	1	259	105	80	2nd of 8-GH; 2nd of 25 GOJHL	Won Conf. Quarter-finals, 4-0 (Jr. Canadians); Won Conf. Semifinals 4-2 (Kilty B's); Lost Conf. Finals 3-4 (Canucks)
2019-20	50	33	15	1	1	201	119	68	3rd of 9-GH; 8th of 26 GOJHL	Won Conf. Quarter-finals, 4-0 (Panthers); Incomplete Conf. Semifinals 3-2 (Canucks) remaining playoffs cancelled
2020–21	Season lost due to Covid-19									
2021-22	48	36	10	1	1	178	78	74	2nd of 8-GH; 2nd of 25 GOJHL	Won Conf. Quarter-finals, 4-0 (Panthers); Won Conf. Semifinals 4-0 (Corvairs); Won Conf. Finals 4-2 (Kilty B's); GH Conference Champions; Round Robin 3-1 vs. (Maroons) & (Redhawks} Won League Finals 2-0 (Maroons); Sutherland Cup Champions (2nd)
2022-23	50	38	6	6	0	194	111	82	1st of 8-GH; 1st of 25 GOJHL	Won Conf. Quarter-finals, 4-0 (Panthers); Lost Conf. Semifinals 3-4 (Corvairs)
2023-24	50	36	12	1	1	194	128	74	3rd of 7-GH; 5th of 23 GOJHL	Won Conf. Quarter-finals, 4-1 (Panthers); Lost Conf Semifinals, 2-4 (Meteors)
2024-25	50	35	13	1	1	202	137	72	1st of 11 East Conf; 3rd of 23 GOJHL	Won Conf. Quarter-finals, 4-1 (Kilty B's); Won Conf Semifinals, 4-0 (Titans); Won Conf Final 4-2 (Meteors); Lost Sutherland Cup 2-4 (Maroons)
2025-26	50	42	6	2	0	202	218	113	1st of 11 East Conf; 3rd of 23 GOJHL	Won Conf. Quarter-finals, 4-1 (Kilty B's); Won Conf Semifinals, 4-0 (Titans); Won Conf Final 4-2 (Meteors); Lost Sutherland Cup 2-4 (Maroons)

== Sutherland Cup appearances ==
1979: Streetsville Derbys defeated St. Catharines Falcons 4-games-to-none
1990: Stratford Cullitons defeated St. Catharines Falcons 4-games-to-none
1994: Waterloo Siskins defeated St. Catharines Falcons 4-games-to-2
1997: Elmira Sugar Kings defeated St. Catharines Falcons 4-games-to-3
2000: Cambridge Winterhawks defeated St. Catharines Falcons 4-games-to-none
2012: St. Catharines Falcons defeated Brantford Eagles 4-games-to-2
2014: Caledonia Corvairs defeated St. Catharines Falcons 4-games-to-3
2022: St. Catharines Falcons defeated Chatham Maroons 2-games-to-none

== Notable alumni ==
- Steve Bancroft
- Brian Bellows
- Ryan Christie
- Jeff Greenlaw
- Paul Laus
- Daultan Leveille
- Rob Robinson
- Andy Rymsha
- Steve Rymsha
- Riley Sheahan
- Vic Teal
- Jacques Michaud
- Arber Xhekaj
