= Sutherland Cup =

Canadian Junior ice hockey trophy (1934–)

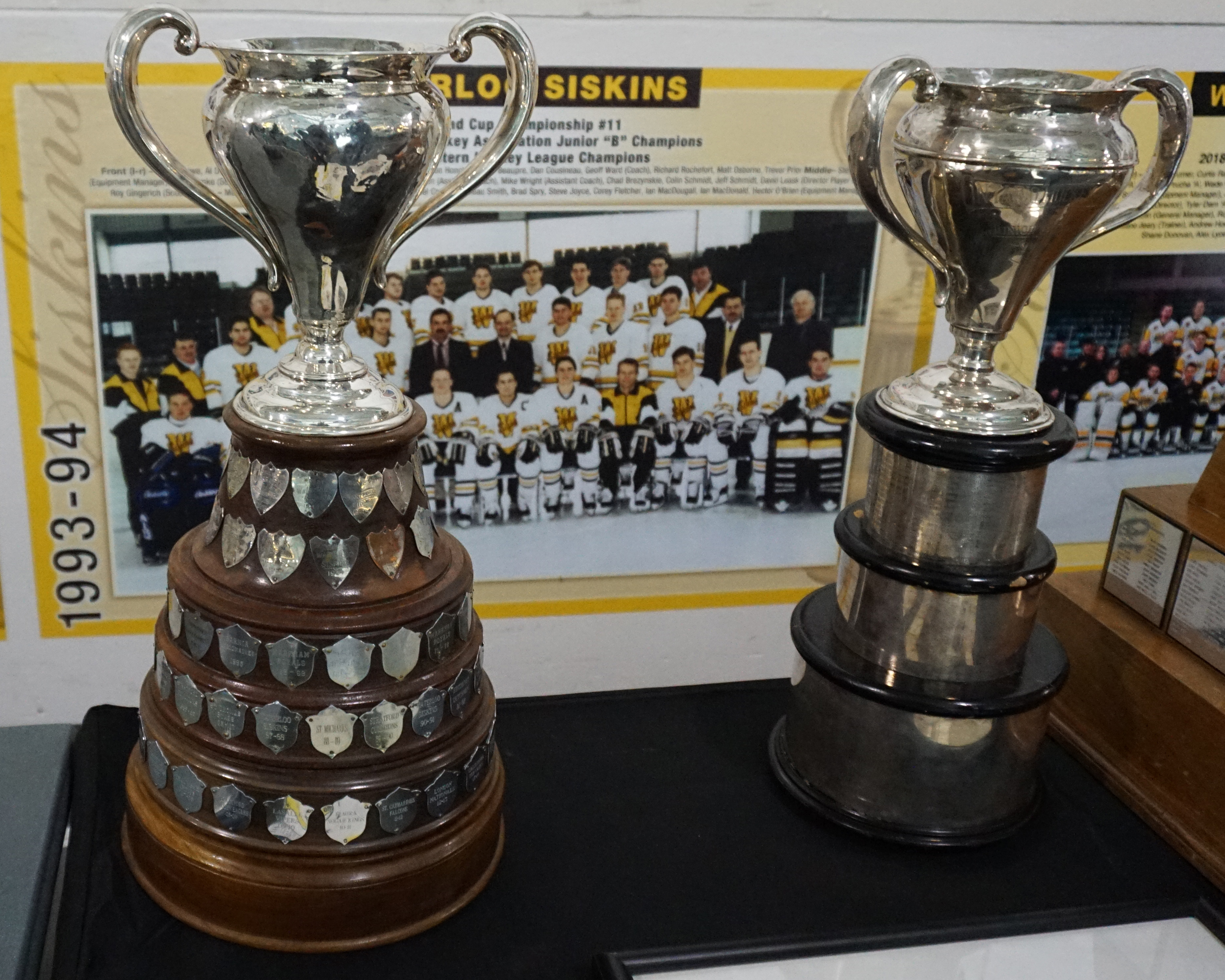
- The Sutherland Cup trophy with the travelling trophy
- Sport: Ice hockey
- Awarded for: Junior "B" Provincial Championship trophy

History
- First award: 1934
- First winner: St. Michael's Buzzers
- Most wins: Waterloo Siskins (12)
- Most recent: Cambridge Redhawks (2026)

The Sutherland Cup is the Ontario ice hockey Junior "B" Provincial Championship trophy. The trophy was first awarded in 1934, and named in honour of former OHA and CAHA president, James T. Sutherland.

The Sutherland Cup is now the championship trophy of the Greater Ontario Hockey League. Until 2007, the Cup served as an interleague provincial championship. From 1976 until 1978, as many as eight leagues competed for the Sutherland Cup in a massive playdown structure that took months to complete.

There is no National Championship for Junior B hockey in Canada, similar championships are held in Western Canada (Keystone Cup), Quebec (Coupe Dodge), Eastern Ontario (Barkley Cup), and Atlantic Canada (Don Johnson Memorial Cup)—leaving five teams at the end of each year with a shared claim to being the best Junior B team in Canada.

== Competing leagues ==
- Greater Ontario Junior Hockey League (GOJHL) 2007 to present

== Past competing leagues ==
- Border Cities Junior B Hockey League (BCJHL) 1958–1964
- Central Junior B Hockey League (CJBHL) 1954–1993
- Eastern Junior B Hockey League (EJBHL) 1955–1972
- Golden Horseshoe Junior Hockey League (GHJHL) 1974–2007
- Metro Junior B Hockey League (MetJHL) 1956–1989
- Mid-Ontario Junior B Hockey League (MOJBHL) 1968–1978
- Mid-Western Junior Hockey League (MWJBHL) 1977–2007

- a.k.a. Southwestern Junior B Hockey League (SJBHL) 1973–1974
- a.k.a. Waterloo-Wellington Junior B Hockey League (WWJHL) 1974–1977

- Niagara District Junior B Hockey League (NJBHL) 1956–1979
- Southwestern Junior B Hockey League (SWJBHL) 1976–1978
- Western Junior B Hockey League (WOJBHL) 1956–1968
- Western Ontario Hockey League (WOHL) 1969–2007

== Sutherland Cup Champions ==
Early Groupings (1933–1950)
Year	Champion	Finalist	Semifinalist(s)
1934	St. Michael's Buzzers (Gr 5)	Preston Riverside (Gr 8)	Hagersville (Gr 10), Peterborough (Gr 2)
1935	Barrie Colts	St. Michael's Buzzers	Niagara Falls, Peterborough
1936	St. Michael's Buzzers	Guelph Maple Leafs	Assumption, Kingston
1937	Northern Vocational	Barrie Colts	Guelph, Niagara Falls
1938	Kingston Indians (Gr 1)	Barrie Colts (Gr 15)	Brantford (Gr 11), Northern (Gr 5)
1939	Niagara Falls Good Cheer (Gr 5)	Kitchener Greenshirts (Gr 6)	Oshawa (Gr 2), Runnymede (Gr 3)
1940	Waterloo Siskins	Owen Sound Greys	Aurora Bears (Gr 5)
1941	Brantford Lions (Gr 5)	Oshawa Bees (Gr 3)	Owen Sound (Gr 8), St. Catharines (Gr 6)
1942	Stratford Canadians (Gr 5)	Hamilton Aerovox (Gr 4)	Owen Sound (Gr 7), U of Toronto (Gr 3)
1943	Port Colborne Recreationists	Milton Tigers (TGr)	U of Toronto (PSG), Windsor
1944	De La Salle Academy	Barrie Colts	Kingston, Kitchener
1945	St. Michael's Buzzers (PSG)	Stratford Kroehlers (Gr 9)	Oshawa, Windsor
1946	De La Salle Academy (Gr 3)	Kitchener Greenshirts (Gr 5)	Scarborough (Gr 2), Waterloo (Gr 6)
1947	De La Salle Academy (TGr3)	Hamilton Aerovox (Gr 6)	Port Colborne (Gr 8), Toronto (TGr2)
1948	Hamilton Aerovox (Gr 7)	St. Michael's Buzzers (TGr4)	Upper Canada College (TGr5)
1949	Kitchener Greenshirts (CGr)	Upper Canada College (PSG)	North Toronto (TGr2), Toronto (TGr1)
1950	Barrie Colts (GB)	Guelph Biltmores (WGr)	Toronto Carwill Transport (T)
Formation of Leagues (1950–1969)
Year	Champion	Finalist	Semifinalist(s)
1951	Sarnia Jr. Sailors (W)	Weston Dukes (Met)	Kingston (E), Kitchener (WGr)
1952	Weston Dukes (Met)	Waterloo Siskins (WGr)	Belleville (E), Hamilton (ND)
1953	Weston Dukes (Met)	Waterloo Siskins (WGr)	Belleville (E), Seaforth (W)
1954	Waterloo Siskins (WGr)	Weston Dukes (Met)	Kingston Vics (E)
1955	Woodstock Warriors (C)	Woodbridge Dodgers (Met)	Peterborough (E), Seaforth (W)
1956	Waterloo Siskins (C)	Brampton Regents (Met)	Kingston Vics (E)
1957	Dixie Beehives (Met)	Sarnia Legionnaires (W)	Burlington (C), Peterborough (E)
1958	Sarnia Legionnaires (W)	Lakeshore Bruins (Met)	Burlington (C), Peterborough (E)
1959	Sarnia Legionnaires (W)	Aurora Bears (Met)	St. Catharines (ND), Waterloo (C)
1960	Waterloo Siskins (C)	Toronto Marlboros (Met)	Chatham (BC), Peterborough (E)
1961	St. Michael's Buzzers (Met)	Owen Sound Greys (C)	Peterborough (E), St. Marys
1962	Waterloo Siskins (C)	St. Thomas Barons (W)	Belleville (E), Chatham (BC)
1963	St. Marys Lincolns (W)	Kingston Frontenacs (E)	Burlington (ND), Detroit (BC)
1964	Waterloo Siskins (C)	Weston Dodgers (Met)	Kingston (E), London (W)
1965	Kitchener Greenshirts (C)	Etobicoke Indians (Met)	Hamilton (ND), London (W)
1966	Sarnia Legionnaires (W)	Westclair York Steelers (Met)	Hamilton (ND), Oshawa (E)
1967	Kitchener Greenshirts (C)	Dixie Beehives (Met)	Peterborough (E), Stamford (ND)
1968	Sarnia Legionnaires (W)	Markham Seal-A-Wax (Met)	Oshawa (E), St. Marys (C)
1969	Markham Seal-A-Wax (Met)	Strathroy Rockets (C)	Hamilton (ND), Oshawa (E)
League Expansion Era (1969–1979)
Year	Champion	Finalist	Semi-finalist(s)
1970	Dixie Beehives (Met)	Hamilton Mountain Bees (ND)	Kingston (E), Stratford (WO)
1971	Dixie Beehives (Met)	Hamilton Mountain Bees (ND)	Peterborough (E), Petrolia (BC)
1972	Markham Waxers (Met)	St. Marys Lincolns (WO)	Peterborough (E), St. Catharines (ND)
1973	Sarnia Bees (WO)	Toronto Nationals (Met)	Hamilton (ND), Owen Sound (MO)
1974	Hamilton Red Wings (ND)	Bramalea Blues (Met)	Owen Sound (MO), Sarnia (WO)
1975	Bramalea Blues (Met)	Oakville Blades (C)	Hamilton (GH), Waterloo (WW)
1976	St. Marys Lincolns (WO)	Collingwood Blues (MO)	Belleville (Met), Streetsville (C)
1977	Stratford Cullitons (WW)	Streetsville Derbys (C)	St. Catharines (GH), Seneca (Met)
1978	Stratford Cullitons (MW)	Streetsville Derbys (C)	Oshawa (Met), Windsor (WO)
1979	Streetsville Derbys (C)	St. Catharines Falcons (GH)	Oshawa (Met), Windsor (WO)
4- and 5-League Eras (1979–1993)
Year	Champion	Finalist	Semifinalist(s)
1980	Belleville Bobcats (Met)	Windsor Royals (WO)	Streetsville Derbys (C)
1981	Burlington Cougars (C)	Stratford Cullitons (MW)	St. Catharines (GH), St. Michael's (Met)
1982	St. Michael's Buzzers (Met)	Sarnia Bees (WO)	Oakville Blades (C)
1983	Henry Carr Crusaders (Met)	Stratford Cullitons (MW)	London (WO), Streetsville (C)
1984	Waterloo Siskins (MW)	Streetsville Derbys (C)	Oshawa Legionaires (Met)
1985	Waterloo Siskins (MW)	Bramalea Blues (Met)	Barrie Colts (C)
1986	Stratford Cullitons (MW)	Streetsville Derbys (C)	Pickering (Met), St. Thomas (WO)
1987	St. Thomas Stars (WO)	Niagara Falls Devils (GH)	Burlington Cougars (C)
1988	Waterloo Siskins (MW)	Bramalea Blues (Met)	Barrie (C), Niagara Falls (GH)
1989	St. Michael's Buzzers (Met)	Niagara Falls Devils (GH)	Barrie (C), Sarnia (WO)
1990	Stratford Cullitons (MW)	St. Catharines Falcons (GH)	Barrie (C), Chatham (WO)
1991	Waterloo Siskins (MW)	Oakville Blades (C)	Chatham (WO), Welland (GH)
1992	Kitchener Dutchmen (MW)	Milton Merchants (C)	London (WO), St. Catharines (GH)
1993	Barrie Colts (C)	Kitchener Dutchmen (MW)	Hamilton (GH), Sarnia (WO)
3-League Era (1993–2007)
Year	Champion	Finalist	RR Finalist
1994	Waterloo Siskins (MW)	St. Catharines Falcons (GH)	St. Marys Lincolns (WO)
1995	Stratford Cullitons (MW)	St. Thomas Stars (WO)	Niagara Falls Canucks (GH)
1996	Niagara Falls Canucks (GH)	St. Thomas Stars (WO)	Stratford Cullitons (MW)
1997	Elmira Sugar Kings (MW)	St. Catharines Falcons (GH)	Strathroy Rockets (WO)
1998	Niagara Falls Canucks (GH)	Elmira Sugar Kings (MW)	Chatham Maroons (WO)
1999	Chatham Maroons (WO)	Stratford Cullitons (MW)	St. Catharines Falcons (GH)
2000	Cambridge Winterhawks (MW)	St. Catharines Falcons (GH)	Chatham Maroons (WO)
2001	Elmira Sugar Kings (MW)	Thorold Blackhawks (GH)	Chatham Maroons (WO)
2002	Sarnia Blast (WO)	Elmira Sugar Kings (MW)	Niagara Falls Canucks (GH)
2003	Stratford Cullitons (MW)	Thorold Blackhawks (GH)	Petrolia Jets (WO)
2004	Stratford Cullitons (MW)	Thorold Blackhawks (GH)	Chatham Maroons (WO)
2005	Thorold Blackhawks (GH)	Chatham Maroons (WO)	Listowel Cyclones (MW)
2006	Cambridge Winterhawks (MW)	Niagara Falls Canucks (GH)	Chatham Maroons (WO)
2007	Cambridge Winterhawks (MW)	Strathroy Rockets (WO)	St. Catharines Falcons (GH)
Greater Ontario Junior Hockey League (2007–Present)
Year	Champion	Finalist	RR Finalist
2008	Tecumseh Chiefs (WOC)	Elmira Sugar Kings (MWC)	Thorold Blackhawks (GHC)
2009	Brantford Eagles (MWC)	Stoney Creek Warriors (GHC)	Sarnia Legionnaires (WOC)
2010	LaSalle Vipers (WOC)	Brantford Eagles (MWC)	Stoney Creek Warriors (GHC)
2011	Elmira Sugar Kings (MWC)	Niagara Falls Canucks (GHC)	St. Thomas Stars (WOC)
2012	St. Catharines Falcons (GHC)	Brantford Eagles (MWC)	London Nationals (WOC)
2013	London Nationals (WOC)	Cambridge Winter Hawks (MWC)	St. Catharines Falcons (GHC)
Year	Champion	Finalist	Semifinalist(s)
2014	Caledonia Corvairs (GHC)	St. Catharines Falcons (GHC)*	Leamington (WOC), Waterloo (MWC)
2015	Caledonia Corvairs (GHC)	LaSalle Vipers (WOC)*	Elmira (MWC), Leamington (WOC)
2016	Caledonia Corvairs (GHC)	London Nationals (WOC)	Stratford (MWC), Waterloo* (MWC)
2017	Elmira Sugar Kings* (MWC)	London Nationals (WOC)	Caledonia (GHC), Listowel (MWC)
2018	Listowel Cyclones (MWC)	Caledonia Corvairs (GHC)	Elmira* (MWC), London (WOC)
2019	Waterloo Siskins (MWC)	London Nationals (WOC)	Listowel* (MWC), Niagara Falls (GHC)
2020 & 2021	Cancelled due to COVID-19 outbreak
Year	Champion	Finalist	RR Finalist
2022	St. Catharines Falcons (GHC)	Chatham Maroons (WOC)	Cambridge Redhawks (MWC)
2023	Leamington Flyers (WOC)	Stratford Warriors (MWC)	Hamilton Kilty B's (GHC)
2024	Listowel Cyclones (MWC)	St. Marys Lincolns (WOC)	Fort Erie Meteors(GHC)
Year	Champion	Finalist
2025	Chatham Maroons (WC)	St. Catharines Falcons (EC)
2026	Cambridge Redhawks (EC)	St. Marys Lincolns (WC)

(*) advanced to championship round as wild card. Lost in conference final, but advanced based on superior record over the other two conference finalists.
