= St. Thomas Stars =

Canadian junior ice hockey team

- City: St. Thomas, Ontario
- League: Greater Ontario Hockey League
- Conference: Western
- Founded: 1961
- Home arena: Joe Thornton Community Centre
- Colours: Green, gold, and black
- General manager: Kevin Linker
- Head coach: Jason Williams
- Affiliates: London Knights (OHL)
- Website: Official website

Franchise history
- 1961–1970: St. Thomas Barons
- 1970–1973: St. Thomas Elgins
- 1973–1980: St. Thomas Colonels
- 1980–1984: St. Thomas Pests
- 1984–present: St. Thomas Stars

Championships
- Playoff championships: Sutherland Cup: 1987; WOC: 1966, 1987, 1995, 1996, 2010; WOJAHL: 1969

The St. Thomas Stars are a Canadian junior ice hockey team based in St. Thomas, Ontario, Canada. The team plays in the Western division of the Greater Ontario Hockey League.

== History ==
Junior ice hockey in St. Thomas began in 1961 with the St. Thomas Barons in the Western Ontario Junior "B" Hockey League.

The Barons won the league championship during the 1968–69 season, then played against the Flin Flon Bombers from the Western Canada Hockey League (WCHL) for the Canadian Hockey Association east-west final, and for the Father Athol Murray Trophy. The series was a best-of-seven format which began in St. Thomas. It was the first Canadian national junior ice hockey championship played which was not under the jurisdiction of the Canadian Amateur Hockey Association.

The Barons withdrew from the championship series during the fourth game, played at the Whitney Forum in Flin Flon on May 5. The team left after an on-ice brawl during the second period. The referee defaulted the game to the Bombers, who were leading by a 4–0 score at the time. The Bombers led the series three games to one after the default win. Game five was scheduled in Flin Flon on May 7, and games six and seven would have been in St. Thomas if necessary. The Barons were escorted from the arena to their hotel by the Royal Canadian Mounted Police due to fear of violence. The Canadian Press described the Barons as being over-matched in the series and were not up to the calibre of the WCHL. The Barons abandoned the series in the interest of player safety, and departed for home on May 6, despite a scheduled game on May 7 in Flin Flon. The team paid its own expenses to get home, with assistance from some of its fans who made the road trip to Manitoba.

Canadian Hockey Association president Ron Butlin awarded the series to Flin Flon, and suspended the St. Thomas Barons from the association. Barons' coach Keith Kewly said the decision was his to abandon the series.

The Barons joined the Southern Ontario Junior A Hockey League in 1970, and switched their name to the Elgins. The Elgins folded in 1973, and were merged into the St. Thomas Colonels in the Central Junior C Hockey League. The team moved into the Southwestern Ontario Junior "B" Hockey League in 1976, and then into the Western Ontario Junior Hockey League in 1978. The Colonels changed their name to the Pests in 1980, and then to the Stars in 1984.

For the 2025–26 GOJHL season, former National Hockey League player Jason Williams became the head coach, replacing David Matsos.

== Season-by-season results ==
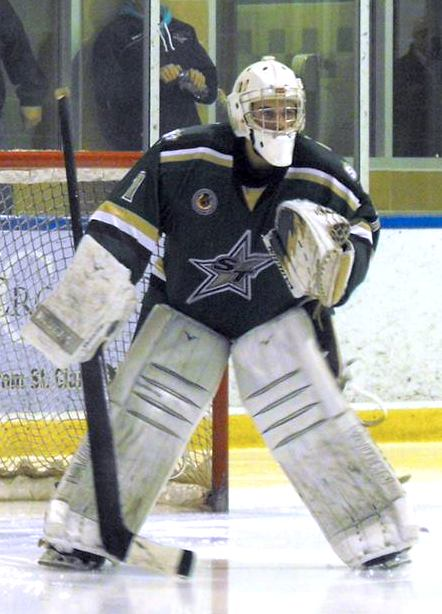
Stars goalie during 2013-14 season.

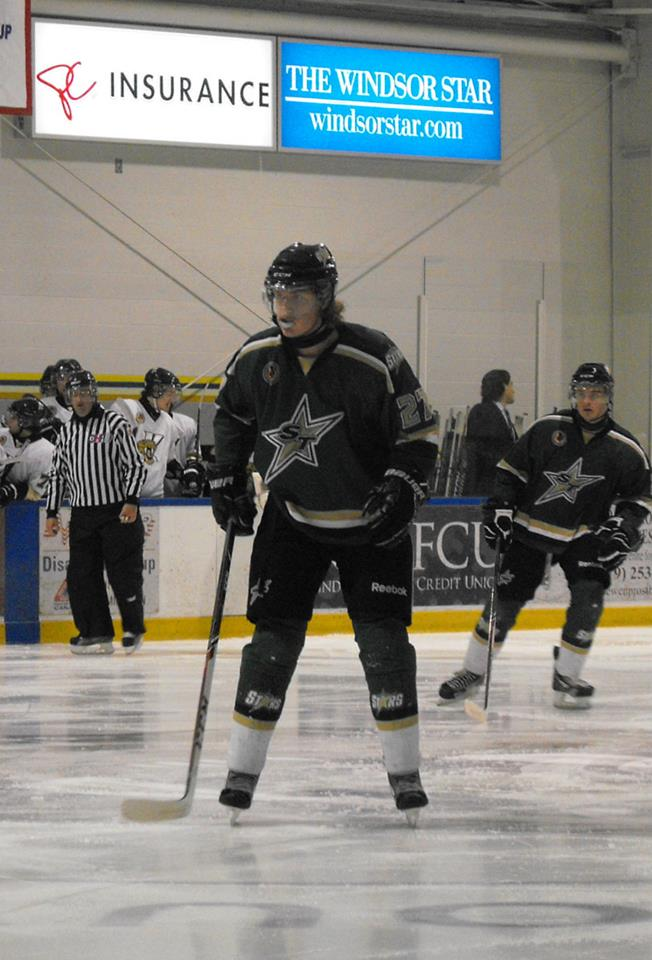
Stars player during 2013-14 season.

Season	GP	W	L	T	OTL	GF	GA	P	Results	Playoffs
1972-73	31	4	26	1	-	--	--	9	8th CJCHL	
1973-74	32	15	13	4	-	179	177	34	4th CJCHL	
1974-75	36	13	17	6	-	248	259	32	4th CJCHL III	
1975-76	27	8	18	1	-	152	182	17	4th CJCHL III	
1976-77	38	11	25	2	-	201	284	24	6th SWJBHL	DNQ
1977-78	40	19	20	1	-	237	223	39	3rd SWJBHL	Lost semi-final
1978-79	42	3	37	2	-	148	330	8	8th WOJHL	
1979-80	42	2	38	2	-	121	388	6	8th WOJHL	
1980-81	42	7	29	6	-	162	274	20	7th WOJHL	
1981-82	42	10	27	5	-	182	248	25	8th WOJHL	
1982-83	42	17	17	8	-	178	193	42	4th WOJHL	
1983-84	48	22	21	5	-	238	233	49	5th WOJHL	
1984-85	48	20	23	5	-	254	292	45	4th WOJHL	
1985-86	42	26	11	5	-	245	169	57	2nd WOJHL	Won League
1986-87	42	24	15	3	-	271	234	51	4th WOJHL	Won League, won SC
1987-88	42	19	20	2	1	213	207	41	5th WOJHL	
1988-89	42	9	30	2	1	195	284	21	7th WOJHL	
1989-90	40	17	19	3	1	173	185	38	6th WOJHL	
1990-91	48	34	11	1	2	234	183	71	2nd WOJHL	
1991-92	48	17	27	3	1	202	227	38	4th WOJHL East	
1992-93	52	23	23	3	3	-	-	52	3rd WOJHL East	
1993-94	51	10	36	2	3	192	307	25	5th WOJHL East	
1994-95	52	36	13	0	3	351	245	75	1st WOJHL East	Won League, lost SC final
1995-96	52	28	18	5	1	272	244	62	2nd WOJHL East	Won League, lost SC final
1996-97	52	30	18	3	1	234	216	64	2nd WOJHL East	
1997-98	52	36	11	5	0	304	210	77	1st WOJHL East	Lost final
1998-99	52	37	11	0	4	301	195	78	1st WOJHL East	Lost final
1999-00	54	31	17	0	6	229	200	68	4th GOHL	
2000-01	54	12	41	0	1	151	298	25	10th GOHL	
2001-02	54	13	37	4	0	183	289	30	9th WOJHL	
2002-03	48	19	25	2	2	142	171	42	6th WOJHL	
2003-04	48	22	19	4	3	154	148	51	6th WOJHL	
2004-05	48	31	15	1	1	184	141	64	2nd WOJHL	Lost final
2005-06	48	21	22	3	2	132	140	47	7th WOJHL	
2006-07	48	25	20	-	3	177	195	53	6th WOJHL	Lost quarter-final
2007-08	48	19	20	-	9	165	187	47	7th GOJHL-W	Lost quarter-final
2008-09	52	12	31	-	9	154	258	33	8th GOJHL-W	Lost quarter-final
2009-10	50	21	25	-	4	173	179	46	7th GOJHL-W	Lost Conf. Final
2010-11	51	30	17	-	4	200	163	64	4th GOJHL-W	Lost SF Round Robin
2011-12	51	26	23	-	2	204	215	54	5th GOJHL-W	Lost Conf. QF
2012-13	51	26	18	-	7	194	209	59	5th GOJHL-W	Lost Conf. QF
2013-14	49	20	26	-	3	168	211	43	7th GOJHL-W	Lost Conf. QF
2014-15	49	22	20	-	7	166	170	49	6th GOJHL-W	Lost Conf Quarter, 2-4 (Sarnia)
2015-16	50	27	19	2	2	200	173	58	5th of 9-W; 12th of 26-GOJHL	Lost Conf Quarter, 1-4 (Chatham)
2016-17	50	19	27	2	2	181	200	32	7th of 9-W; 19th of 27-GOJHL	Lost Conf Quarter, 0-4 (Chatham)
2017-18	50	29	16	3	2	182	154	63	5th of 9-W; 11th of 26-GOJHL	Won Conf Quarter, 4-1 (Sarnia); Won Conf. Semifinals 4-3 (Flyers); Lost Conf. Finals 0-4 (Nationals)
2018-19	48	17	24	3	4	145	176	41	7th of 9-W; 17th of 25-GOJHL	Lost Conf Quarter, 1-4 (Nationals)
2019-20	50	12	32	1	5	146	262	30	9th of 9-W; 21st of 25-GOJHL	Did not qualify for post season
2020-21	Season lost due to pandemic									
2021-22	48	18	26	3	1	149	175	40	7th of 9-W; 18th of 25-GOJHL	Lost Conf Quarter, 2-4 (Nationals)
2022-23	50	21	23	4	2	183	180	48	7th of 9-W; 18th of 25-GOJHL	Lost Conf Quarter, 0-4 (Nationals)
2023-24	50	18	27	3	2	143	204	41	6th of 8-W; 16th of 23-GOJHL	Lost Conf Quarter, 1-4 (Rockets)
2024-25	50	12	34	3	1	96	254	28	11th of 12-West; 20th of 23-GOJHL	Did not qualify for post season
2025-26	50	24	23	2	1	189	189	51	8th of 12-West; 13th of 23-GOJHL	Lost Conf Quarter, 0-4 (Chatham)

== Barons/Elgins season-by-season results ==
St. Thomas Barons
- City: St. Thomas, Ontario, Canada
- League: Southern Ontario Junior A Hockey League; Western Ontario Junior A Hockey League; Western Ontario Junior B Hockey League
- Operated: 1961–1973
- Colors: Green, Yellow, and White

Franchise history
- 1961–1970: St. Thomas Barons
- 1970–1973: St. Thomas Elgins
- 1973: Merged with St. Thomas Colonels

Season	GP	W	L	T	OTL	GF	GA	P	Results	Playoffs
1961-62	36	26	9	1	-	238	180	53	1st WOJBHL	Won League
1962-63	35	24	11	0	-	246	153	48	2nd WOJBHL	
1963-64	40	29	11	0	-	273	185	58	1st WOJBHL	
1964-65	39	20	18	2	-	213	206	42	4th WOJBHL	
1965-66	40	21	17	2	-	227	209	44	4th WOJBHL	
1966-67	40	26	13	1	-	225	165	53	1st WOJBHL	Won League
1967-68	50	25	22	3	-	297	241	53	3rd WOJBHL	
1968-69	56	37	18	1	-	255	178	75	1st WOJAHL	Won League, lost National Final
1969-70	54	31	21	2	-	245	236	64	3rd WOJAHL	
1970-71	44	13	26	5	-	205	270	31	5th SOJAHL	
1971-72	56	20	26	10	-	244	288	50	4th SOJAHL	
1972-73	60	10	45	5	-	209	373	25	7th SOJAHL	

=== Playoffs ===
- 1969 Won League, lost CHA Championship

St. Thomas Barons defeated Chatham Maroons 4-games-to-2
St. Thomas Barons defeated Brantford Foresters 4-games-to-none WOJAHL CHAMPIONS
Flin Flon Bombers (WCHL) defeated St. Thomas Barons 2-games-to-1 and series default

- 1970 Lost semi-final

Chatham Maroons defeated St. Thomas Barons 4-games-to-none

- 1971 DNQ
- 1972 Lost semi-final

Guelph CMC's defeated St. Thomas Barons 4-games-to-none

- 1973 DNQ

== Sutherland Cup appearances ==
1962: Waterloo Siskins defeated St. Thomas Barons 4-games-to-1
1987: St. Thomas Stars defeated Niagara Falls Canucks 4-games-to-none
1995: Stratford Cullitons defeated St. Thomas Stars 4-games-to-none
1996: Niagara Falls Canucks defeated St. Thomas Stars 4-games-to-2

== Notable alumni ==
- Gregory Campbell
- Dan Cloutier
- Logan Couture
- John Cullen
- Rick Foley
- Bo Horvat
- Ken Murray
- Danny Schock
- Joe Thornton
- Brian Willsie
