= Cambridge Redhawks =

- City: Cambridge, Ontario, Canada
- League: Greater Ontario Hockey League
- Division: GOHL East Conference
- Founded: c. 1960
- Home arena: Galt Arena Gardens
- Colours: Maroon, black, and white
- Owners: Rob McIntosh, Eric Boissoneault, Jason Stangl, Troy Futher, JP Boileau, Blake Sicard and Greg Shoniker
- General manager: Kevin Purdie
- Head coach: Todd Bertuzzi

Franchise history
- 1960–1979: Hespeler Shamrocks
- 1979–1982: Cambridge Shamrocks
- 1982–1985: Guelph Holody Platers
- 1986–1991: Guelph B's
- 1991–1996: Guelph Holody Platers
- 1996–2000: Guelph Fire
- 2000–2009: Guelph Dominators
- 2009–2018: Guelph Hurricanes
- 2018–present: Cambridge Redhawks

The Cambridge Redhawks are a Canadian junior ice hockey team based in Cambridge, Ontario, Canada. They compete in the Eastern Conference of the Greater Ontario Hockey League (GOHL). From 1986 to 2018, the franchise played in nearby Guelph under various monikers such as Platers, Fire, Dominators, and Hurricanes.

== History ==
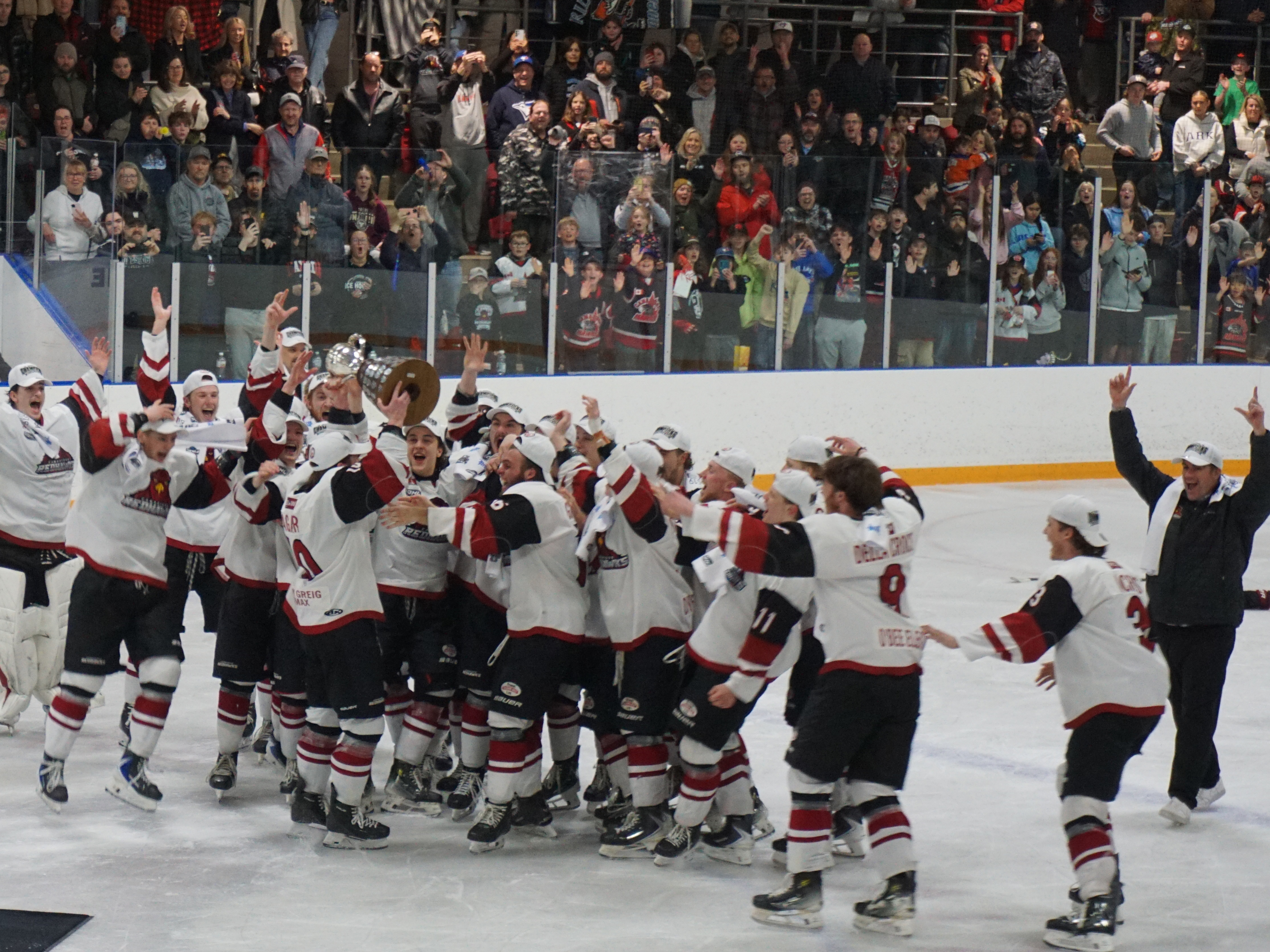
The Cambridge Redhawks winning the 2026 Sutherland Cup at the Galt Arena Gardens in Cambridge, Ontario.

Founded in 1960 as the Hespeler Shamrocks, the team became the Cambridge Shamrocks in 1979 due to a town amalgamation. In 1982, the Shamrocks were purchased by Joe Holody and moved to Guelph to become the farm team to the Guelph Platers (OHL). The team kept the "Platers" moniker until 1996, despite their parent club moving and stranding them to become the Owen Sound Platers in 1989. The team became known as the Fire in 1996 for four seasons before rebranding once again as the Dominators until 2009.

The team first played in the Central Junior C Hockey League, a league now known as the Western Junior C Hockey League. In 1970, they joined the Mid-Ontario Junior B Hockey League, and in 1971 joined the new Central Junior B Hockey League, the precursor to the Ontario Junior Hockey League. In 1974 they moved to the Waterloo-Wellington Junior B League, which, in 1977, became the Midwestern Junior Hockey League and have been there ever since.

During the mid to late 90s the Guelph Platers operated as the "farm team" for the Guelph Storm. They would wear the same colour scheme as the original team (with the classic lightning bolt theme) and played out of Guelph Memorial Gardens. While the team generally did not fare well on the ice during most of this period, they had several players drafted into the OHL, receive walk-on tryouts to Major Junior teams, and US college scholarships. Eventually the Platers would become the Guelph Fire. This lasted just four seasons before the team was purchased by a local pizza shop owner who rebranded the team as the Guelph Dominators. In 2009, the Dominators became the Guelph Hurricanes, calling Sleeman Centre home.

In May 2018, it was announced the Hurricanes were relocating back to Cambridge, taking over the market recently occupied by the Cambridge Winter Hawks who left the league in 2017.

In the 2025-26 season, the Cambridge Redhawks defeated the St. Marys Lincolns in five games to win the franchise's first Sutherland Cup.

== Season-by-season record ==
Season	GP	W	L	T	OTL	Pts	GF	GA	Finish	Playoffs
1961–62	30	9	18	3	—	21	108	147	4th CJCHL	
1962–63	28	20	5	3	—	43	203	114	1st CJCHL	
1963–64	30	25	5	0	—	50	241	101	1st CJCHL	Won League; Won Schmalz Cup
1964–65	32	21	10	1	—	43	187	141	3rd CJCHL	
1965–66	32	4	27	1	—	9	111	204	12th CJCHL	
1966–67	24	8	16	0	—	16	81	138	7th WJCHL	
1967–68	Statistics not available									
1968–69	30	12	16	2	—	26	103	123	5th WJCHL	
1969–70	25	20	4	1	—	41	—	—	1st WJCHL	Won League; Lost Schmalz Cup Final
1970–71	34	18	12	4	—	40	193	139	3rd MOJBHL	
1971–72	42	27	11	4	—	58	237	170	2nd CJBHL	
1972–73	42	15	20	7	—	37	192	199	5th CJBHL	
1973–74	42	12	25	5	—	29	192	232	6th CJBHL	
1974–75	40	23	13	4	—	50	216	187	3rd WWJHL	
1975–76	41	3	37	1	—	7	118	372	7th WWJHL	
1976–77	40	20	19	1	—	41	252	241	4th WWJHL	Lost Semifinals
1977–78	40	18	18	4	—	40	217	195	3rd MWJBHL	Lost Semifinals
1978–79	42	2	36	4	—	8	153	338	7th MWJBHL	Did not qualify
1979–80	42	15	25	2	—	32	183	229	7th MWJBHL	Did not qualify
1980–81	42	16	26	0	—	32	203	236	7th MWJBHL	Did not qualify
1981–82	42	30	11	1	—	61	246	173	2nd MWJBHL	Lost Semifinals
1982–83	42	26	15	1	—	53	253	196	3rd MWJBHL	Lost Semifinals
1983–84	42	11	30	1	—	23	179	289	7th MWJBHL	Did not qualify
1984–85	42	9	32	1	—	19	174	307	7th MWJBHL	Did not qualify
1985–86	Did not participate									
1986–87	41	3	38	0	—	6	128	353	7th MWJBHL	Did not qualify
1987–88	48	11	37	0	—	22	184	327	8th MWJBHL	Lost Quarterfinals
1988–89	48	9	36	3	—	21	175	306	9th MWJBHL	Did not qualify
1989–90	48	13	35	0	—	26	180	347	8th MWJBHL	Lost Quarterfinals
1990–91	48	14	34	0	—	28	188	266	7th MWJBHL	Lost Quarterfinals
1991–92	48	11	36	1	—	23	136	266	8th MWJBHL	Lost Quarterfinals
1992–93	48	20	26	2	—	42	224	253	6th MWJBHL	Lost Quarterfinals
1993–94	48	12	36	0	—	24	201	291	8th MWJBHL	Lost Quarterfinals
1994–95	48	3	45	0	—	6	128	375	10th MWJBHL	Did not qualify
1995–96	48	4	44	0	—	8	158	398	10th MWJBHL	Did not qualify
1996–97	48	7	40	1	—	15	159	314	10th MWJBHL	Did not qualify
1997–98	48	11	35	2	—	24	146	255	9th MWJBHL	Did not qualify
1998–99	48	10	37	1	—	21	79	268	9th MWJBHL	Did not qualify
1999–00	48	10	35	3	—	23	152	259	9th MWJBHL	Did not qualify
2000–01	48	16	31	1	—	33	206	262	8th MWJBHL	Lost Quarterfinals
2001–02	48	21	24	3	—	45	223	207	6th MWJBHL	
2002–03	48	25	19	4	2	56	212	189	4th MWJBHL	
2003–04	48	16	28	3	1	36	156	218	9th MWJBHL	Did not qualify
2004–05	48	7	38	1	2	17	150	258	9th MWJBHL	Did not qualify
2005–06	48	27	20	1	—	55	177	161	3rd MWJBHL	Lost Semifinals
2006–07	48	24	21	2	1	51	192	182	4th MWJBHL	Lost Semifinals
2007–08	48	20	23	4	1	45	145	174	7th GOJHL-MW	
2008–09	52	19	30	—	3	41	168	240	8th GOJHL-MW	Lost Quarterfinals
2009–10	51	16	29	—	6	38	157	231	7th GOJHL-MW	Lost Conf. Quarterfinals
2010–11	51	34	12	—	5	73	259	156	1st GOJHL-MW	Lost Conf. Semifinals
2011–12	51	23	24	—	4	50	183	223	5th GOJHL-MW	Lost Conf. Quarterfinals
2012–13	51	9	42	—	0	18	129	276	9th GOJHL-MW	Did not qualify
2013–14	49	20	24	—	5	45	163	196	6th GOJHL-MW	Lost Conf. Quarterfinals
2014–15	49	28	17	—	4	60	190	163	5th GOJHL-MW	Lost Conf. Quarterfinals, 0–4 (Siskins)
2015–16	50	26	14	3	7	62	185	164	4th of 9 MW; 11th of 26 GOJHL	Lost Conf. Quarterfinals, 1–4 (Sugar Kings)
2016–17	50	14	33	2	1	31	155	209	7th of 9 MW; 21st of 27 GOJHL	Lost Conf. Quarterfinals, 0–4 (Sugar Kings)
2017–18	50	12	30	1	7	32	102	179	8th of 8 MW; 21st of 26 GOJHL	Lost Conf. Quarterfinals, 0–4 (Cyclones)
2018–19	48	19	27	0	2	40	133	178	6th of 8 MW; 18th of 26 GOJHL	Lost Conf. Quarterfinals, 1–4 (Siskins)
2019–20	50	32	13	0	5	69	190	128	3rd of 8 MW; 7th of 26 GOJHL	Won Conf. Quarterfinals, 4-2 (Siskins); Incomplete Conf. Semi 0-1 (Dutchmen) playoffs cancelled due to pandemic
2020–21	Season lost due to pandemic									
2021–22	48	33	12	3	0	69	190	127	2nd of 8 MW; 6th of 25 GOJHL	Won Conf. Quarterfinals, 4-1 (Bombers); Won Conf. Semifinals 4-3 (Siskins); Won Conf. Finals 4-1 (Sugar Kings); Mid-West Conf. Champions; Round Robin 1-3 (Falcons)&(Maroons) eliminated
2022–23	50	34	8	6	2	76	232	130	3rd of 8 MW; 5th of 25 GOJHL	Won Conf. Quarterfinals, 4-1 (Cyclones); Lost Conf. Semifinals 0-4 (Warriors)
2023–24	50	21	25	3	1	46	148	171	6th of 8 MW; 15th of 23 GOJHL	Lost Conf. Quarterfinals, 1-4 (Sugar Kings)
2024–25	50	27	18	4	1	59	186	168	6th of 11 East Conf; 12th of 23 GOJHL	Lost Conf. Quarterfinals, 2-4 (Meteors)
2025-26	50	45	5	0	0	90	262	117	1st of 11 East Conf; 1st of 23 GOHL	Won Conf. Quarterfinals, 4-0 (Corvairs); Won Conf. Semifinals 4-0 (Panthers); Won Conf. Finals 4-0 (Falcons); Won Sutherland Cup Finals 4-1 (Lincolns); Sutherland Cup Champions

== Honours ==
- 1962–63 Central Junior C Hockey League regular season winner
- 1963–64 Central Junior C Hockey League regular season winner; playoff winner; Schmalz Cup winner: defeated Lindsay Lions
- 1969–70 Western Junior C Hockey League regular season winner; playoff winner; Schmalz Cup runner-up: defeated by Newmarket Redmen
- 2010–11 Greater Ontario Junior Hockey League Midwestern Conference regular season winner
- 2021-22 Greater Ontario Junior Hockey League Midwestern Conference playoff winner
- 2025-26 Greater Ontario Hockey League Regular season champions
- 2025-26 Greater Ontario Hockey League Eastern Conference champions
- 2025-26 Greater Ontario Hockey League Sutherland Cup champions

== Sutherland Cup appearances ==
2026: Cambridge Redhawks defeated St. Marys Lincolns 4-games-to-1

== Notable alumni ==
- Kirk Maltby (1988-1989)
- Marty Turco (1993-1994)
- Bryan Little (2002-2003)
- Todd Harvey (1989-1991)
- Jody Hull (1984-1985)
- John Cullen (1982-1983)
- Brian McGrattan (1997–98)
- Matt Moulson (2000–02)
- Rob Zamuner (1986)
- Steve McKenna (1991--92)
- Danny Syvret (2000-2002)
- Cody Bass (2002–03)
- Greg Jacina (1998–99)
- Jet Greaves
- Rumun Ndur (1992–93)
- Mark Versteeg-Lytwyn (2002–03)
- Bob Wren (1989–91)
