= Elmira Sugar Kings =

- City: Elmira, Ontario, Canada
- League: Greater Ontario Hockey League
- Conference: Western Conference
- Founded: 1971
- Home arena: Dan Snyder Arena - Woolwich Memorial Centre (capacity: 1,300)
- Colours: Green, Yellow, and White
- President: Luke Brubacher
- General manager: Ian McAdam
- Head coach: Corey McRae
- Asst. coaches: Zac Coulter; Evan Gowing
- Captain: Brett Warrilow
- Affiliates: Wellesley Applejacks (PJHL), New Hamburg Firebirds (PJHL)

Championships
- Regular season titles: 2 (2001, 2011)
- League champions: 4 (1997, 2001, 2011, 2017)
- Conference titles: 6 (1997, 1998, 2001, 2002, 2008, 2011, 2015)

The Elmira Sugar Kings are a junior hockey team based in Elmira, Ontario, Canada. The Sugar Kings compete as a member of the Western Conference in the Greater Ontario Hockey League (GOHL), which serves as the official development league of the Ontario Hockey League (OHL). They currently play at the Dan Snyder Arena inside the Woolwich Memorial Centre. The Sugar Kings are six-time Cherrey Cup Champions (1997, 1998, 2001, 2002, 2008, 2011, 2015), four-time Sutherland Cup Champions (1997, 2001, 2011, 2017) and two-time Regular Season Champions (2001, 2011).

== History ==
=== Early years ===
The Elmira Sugar Kings have been a part of the sports scene since 1971. This came out of a desire from local sports and business people for skilled hockey players who wanted to play at a greater level than Minor Hockey without leaving town. Their goal was to give local kids a chance to play Junior Hockey at Home. The Elmira Juniors first played at the Junior "C" level during the 1950s and 1960s, winning the Clarence Schmalz Cup in 1962 before rebranding to the Elmira Sugar Kings. The name was chosen as a nod to the "sweet success" of the local Elmira Maple Syrup Festival, which still stands holding the Guinness World Record for the World's Largest Single Day Maple Syrup Festival in the world. The Elmira Sugar Kings' 1st season was in 1971–72, but in 1973, the Sugar Kings entered the Southwestern Junior "B" Hockey League. In that first Junior "B" season, the Sugar Kings won the league championship. In 1974, the league became the Waterloo-Wellington Junior "B" Hockey League, which changed its name to the Midwestern "B" in 1977. Through much of their first 20 years, the Kings were inconsistent—some years finishing with more than 30 wins, some years fewer than 10. But throughout the late 1990s and early 2000s, the Sugar Kings were one of the most dominant teams in Canadian Junior Hockey. In 1997, 1998, 2001, 2002, 2008, 2011 & 2015 the Kings reigned as Mid-Western "B" champions, winning the Sutherland Cup as Ontario Hockey Association Junior B champions in 1997, 2001, 2011 & 2017.

=== Modern era ===
In the decade following their 2011 championship, the Sugar Kings maintained their status as a perennial contender in the Greater Ontario Junior Hockey League (GOJHL). The 2016–17 season marked a significant milestone as the team captured its fourth Sutherland Cup title, defeating the London Nationals in a five-game final series. This victory solidified Elmira as one of the few franchises to win the Provincial Junior B Championship in four different decades, and made them the first team in league history to win entering as a Wild-Card Team.

The 2019–20 Season was statistically one of the strongest in franchise history, with the team setting a record for the highest season Away Winning Percentage (.820) and a record six overtime wins. The organization reached new statistical heights in the mid-2020s. During the 2024–25 season, forward Joey Martin set a (Modern-GOJHL) franchise record for most points in a single season with 85, also earning the Terry Crisp Trophy as the GOJHL scoring champion and Western Conference MVP. On December 14, 2024, Martin set a single-game record with 7 assists in a match against the Komoka Kings. The same season saw defenseman Liam Eveleigh conclude a record-breaking tenure, setting franchise career highs for games played by a defenseman (165) and earning consecutive Conference Top Defenseman honors in 2024 and 2025.

In January 2026, the team celebrated a milestone for Brendan Gerber, who became one of the fastest players in the modern era to reach (100) career points with the franchise.

The Sugar Kings continue to be one of the most competitive teams in the GOHL, having achieved competitive hockey at the Junior Level. Over 185 former Sugar Kings have moved on to play at a higher level of hockey: 50+ players in Junior A, 10 in the NHL, 62 Semi-Pro, 85 in Sports (CIS), 55 in NCAA, 27 in Europe, and 38 as coaches.

== Season-By-Season Record ==
Season	GP	W	L	T	OTL	GF	GA	P	Results	Playoffs
1971-72	39	21	12	6	-	185	166	48	3rd WOJHL	
1972-73	42	19	20	3	-	198	186	41	5th WOJHL	
1973-74	40	20	15	6	-	192	166	46	4th SWJBHL	Won League
1974-75	40	19	15	6	-	189	157	44	4th WWJHL	
1975-76	41	12	20	9	-	181	203	33	6th WWJHL	Lost quarter-final
1976-77	39	13	21	5	-	194	213	31	5th WWJHL	DNQ
1977-78	40	13	20	7	-	162	193	33	4th MWJBHL	Lost semi-final
1978-79	42	30	7	5	-	234	149	65	2nd MWJBHL	Lost final
1979-80	42	16	23	3	-	204	262	35	4th MWJBHL	Lost semi-final
1980-81	42	6	35	1	-	142	286	13	8th MWJBHL	DNQ
1981-82	42	1	40	1	-	118	363	3	8th MWJBHL	DNQ
1982-83	42	7	34	1	-	146	295	15	7th MWJBHL	DNQ
1983-84	42	17	24	1	-	170	198	35	6th MWJBHL	Lost semi-final
1984-85	42	17	24	1	-	179	220	35	6th MWJBHL	Lost quarter-final
1985-86	40	22	17	1	-	206	178	45	3rd MWJBHL	Lost semi-final
1986-87	42	31	11	0	-	292	140	62	3rd MWJBHL	Lost final
1987-88	48	35	11	2	-	286	175	72	2nd MWJBHL	Lost final
1988-89	48	19	24	5	-	241	251	43	6th MWJBHL	Lost semi-final
1989-90	48	26	21	1	-	262	227	53	4th MWJBHL	Lost quarter-final
1990-91	48	8	39	1	-	195	367	17	8th MWJBHL	Lost quarter-final
1991-92	48	6	39	3	-	145	273	15	9th MWJBHL	DNQ
1992-93	48	14	33	1	-	192	283	29	7th MWJBHL	Lost quarter-final
1993-94	48	27	17	4	-	222	174	58	5th MWJBHL	Lost quarter-final
1994-95	48	29	14	5	-	229	169	63	2nd MWJBHL	Lost final
1995-96	48	20	26	2	-	198	214	42	7th MWJBHL	Lost semi-final
1996-97	48	31	11	6	-	257	166	68	2nd MWJBHL	Won League, won SC
1997-98	48	33	12	3	-	259	137	69	2nd MWJBHL	Won League
1998-99	48	29	14	5	-	225	187	63	3rd MWJBHL	Lost semi-final
1999-00	48	33	12	3	-	203	116	69	3rd MWJBHL	Lost semi-final
2000-01	48	28	15	5	-	217	158	61	3rd MWJBHL	Won League, won SC
2001-02	48	38	5	5	-	254	128	81	1st MWJBHL	Won League
2002-03	48	17	28	3	0	178	199	37	9th MWJBHL	DNQ
2003-04	47	20	19	4	4	191	175	48	6th MWJBHL	
2004-05	48	27	13	3	5	199	155	62	6th MWJBHL	
2005-06	48	27	19	2	-	201	150	56	3rd MWJBHL	Lost quarter-final
2006-07	48	36	8	4	0	262	165	76	2nd MWJBHL	Lost final
2007-08	48	30	7	8	3	196	124	71	1st GOJHL-MW	Lost final
2008-09	52	23	24	-	5	207	215	51	7th GOJHL-MW	Lost Conf. QF
2009-10	51	20	26	-	5	163	188	45	6th GOJHL-MW	Lost Conf. SF
2010-11	51	34	15	-	2	219	153	70	2nd GOJHL-MW	Won League, won SC
2011-12	51	40	9	-	2	240	134	82	3rd GOJHL-MW	
2012-13	51	25	21	-	5	180	183	55	7th GOJHL-MW	Lost Conf. QF
2013-14	49	34	10	-	5	187	117	73	2nd GOJHL-MW	Lost Conf. SF
2014-15	49	38	7	-	4	215	127	80	1st GOJHL-MW	Won Conf. Quarters, 4-0 (Bombers); Won Conf. Semis, 4-0 (Siskins); Won Conf. Finals, 4-1 (Cullitons); Lost Sutherland Semifinals, 3-4 (Vipers)
2015-16	50	24	19	2	5	185	177	55	5th of 9-MW; 14th of 26-GOJHL	Won Conf. Quarters, 4-1 (Hurricanes); Lost Conf. Semis, 2-4 (Cullitons)
2016-17	50	38	11	0	1	207	123	77	2nd of 9-MW; 5th of 27-GOJHL	Won Conf. Quarters, 4-0 (Hurricanes); Won Conf. Semifinals, 4-2 (Dutchmen); Lost Conf. Finals, 2-4 (Cyclones) advance as Wild Card; Won Sutherland Cup Semis 4-2 (Corvairs); Won Sutherland Cup Finals 4-1 (Nationals)
2017-18	50	29	21	0	0	181	155	58	3rd of 8-MW; 12th of 26-GOJHL	Won Conf. Quarters, 4-0 (Bombers); Won Conf. Semifinal 4-2 (Warriors); Lost Conf. Finals 0-4 (Cyclones) advance as Wild Card; Lost Sutherland Cup Semis 0-4 (Corvairs)
2018-19	47	26	15	0	6	162	135	58	5th of 8-MW; 11th of 25-GOJHL	Lost Conf. Quarters, 3-4 (Dutchmen)
2019-20	50	36	9	0	5	212	114	77	1st of 8-MW; 114th of 26-GOJHL	Incomplete Conf. Semi, 0-1 (Warriors)
2020-21	Season cancelled due to pandemic									
2021-22	45	35	11	1	1	169	102	72	1st of 8-MW' of 8-MW; 4th of 25-GOJHL	Won Conf. Quarters, 4-0 (Bandits); Won Conf. Semifinal 4-2 (Warriors); Lost Conf. Finals 1-4 (Redhawks)
2022-23	50	29	20	1	0	160	114	59	4 of 9-MW of 8-MW; 11th of 25-GOJHL	Won Conf. Quarters, 4-0 (Centennials); Lost Conf. Semifinal 2-4 (Siskins)
2023-24	50	32	16	0	2	195	151	66	3 of 8-MW of 8-MW; 9th of 23-GOJHL	Won Conf. Quarters, 4-1 (Redhawks); Lost Conf semifinals, 1-4 (Warriors)
2024-25	50	27	19	4	0	194	159	58	7th of 12 West Conf; 13th of 23-GOJHL	Lost Conf. Quarters, 1-4 (Chatham Maroons)
2025-26	50	37	10	2	1	233	139	77	2nd of 12 West Conf; 5th of 23-GOJHL	Won Conf. Quarters, 4-2 (Vipers); Lost Conf. Semifinals, 2-4 (Lincolns)

== Current roster ==
Forwards
#	Name	Pos	DOB	Height	Weight	Shoots	Home town	Draft Info
7	Alex Rossi	F	2007-09-18	6-0	183	R	Wellington, ON	
9	Nolan Shaw	F	2006-04-15	6-1	179	R	Breslau, ON	
10	Ryan Cornfield	F	2006-12-11	5-10	192	R	Kitchener, ON	Barrie (OHL) 2022 Rd: 12 (#233)
11	Brady Schwindt	F	2005-04-14	6-1	180	L	Breslau, ON	Kitchener (OHL) 2021 Rd: 8 (#142)
12	Brendan Gerber	F	2007-02-24	5-9	185	R	New Hamburg, ON	London (OHL) 2023 Rd: 6 (#104)
13	Thomas Chan	F	2006-02-08	5-11	178	L	Waterloo, ON	
14	Ryder Roberson	F	2008-02-18	6-1	210	R	Cambridge, ON	Kitchener (OHL) 2024 Rd: 15 (#297)
15	Benjamin Brunton	F	2008-09-15	5-10	170	L	North Bay, ON	(U18) Guelph (OHL) 2025 Rd: 1 (#2)
17	Nate Gravelle	F	2006-11-17	6-0	187	L	Callander, ON	(U18) North Bay (OHL) 2023 Rd: 1 (#19)
19	Kyle Morey	F	2005-06-27	5-11	175	L	Kitchener, ON	Owen Sound (OHL) 2021 Rd: 5 (#87)
22	Frank Castiglione	F	2006-01-08	6-2	194	L	Richmond Hill, ON	(U18) Guelph (OHL) 2023 Rd: 1 (#12)
23	Brett Warrilow	F	2005-07-05	6-1	200	L	Owen Sound, ON	
28	Sam Ratcliffe	F	2007-05-26	5-8	155	R	Elmira, ON	
Defencemen
#	Name	Pos	DOB	Height	Weight	Shoots	Home town	Draft Info
4	Alex Simioni	D	2006-07-21	5-10	175	R	Kitchener, ON	
6	Elijah Weiss	D	2006-04-02	6-1	210	R	St. Jacobs, ON	
8	Alexander Kyriacou	D	2008-12-05	6-4	200	L	Waterloo, ON	Soo (OHL) 2024 Rd: 13 (#260)
18	Samuel Rivet	D	2008-02-27	6-0	180	L	North Bay, ON	North Bay (OHL) 2024 Rd: 10 (#218)
20	Nolan Battler	D	2008-03-07	6-0	163	R	Guelph, ON	Saginaw (OHL) 2024 Rd: 4 (#70)
21	Tanner Lawson	D	2007-01-17	5-10	160	R	Erin, ON	North Bay (OHL) 2023 Rd: 10 (#201)
25	Lucas Nutting	D	2009-04-05	6-1	165	R	Isleworth, United Kingdom	Flint (OHL) 2025 Rd: 2 (#33)
27	Jackson Young	D	2005-02-08	6-5	215	L	Wasaga Beach, ON	
Goalies
#	Name	Pos	DOB	Height	Weight	Catches	Home town	Draft Info
1	Liam Reid	G	2005-09-24	6-4	205	L	Elora, ON	(U18) Oshawa (OHL) 2022 Rd: 1 (#8)
30	Reed Straus	G	2007-09-24	5-11	180	L	St. Clements, ON	(U18) Oshawa (OHL) 2024 Rd: 2 (#37)

== Current staff ==
- Luke Brubacher: Chair, President
- Kyle Rank: Director of Hockey Operations
- Ian McAdam: General Manager
- Connor Martin: Assistant General Manager
- Cory McRae: Head Coach
- Zac Coulter: Assistant Coach
- Evan Gowing: Assistant Coach
- Matt McGahey: Goalie Coach
- Marissa Lehman: Trainer
- Ian Schnarr: Athletic Trainer
- Lyle Binkley: Equipment Manager
- Eric Stewart: Equipment Assistant
- Mark Erb: Director of Scouting
- Brendan Grant: Scout/Game-Day Presentation
- Matt Thaler: Scout
- Clifton Cope: Scout
- Rick Crease: Scout

The Sugar Kings rely on a group of game-day volunteers, executive members, and support staff for the team's day-to-day operations and hockey club functions.

== Atmosphere ==
=== Facility ===
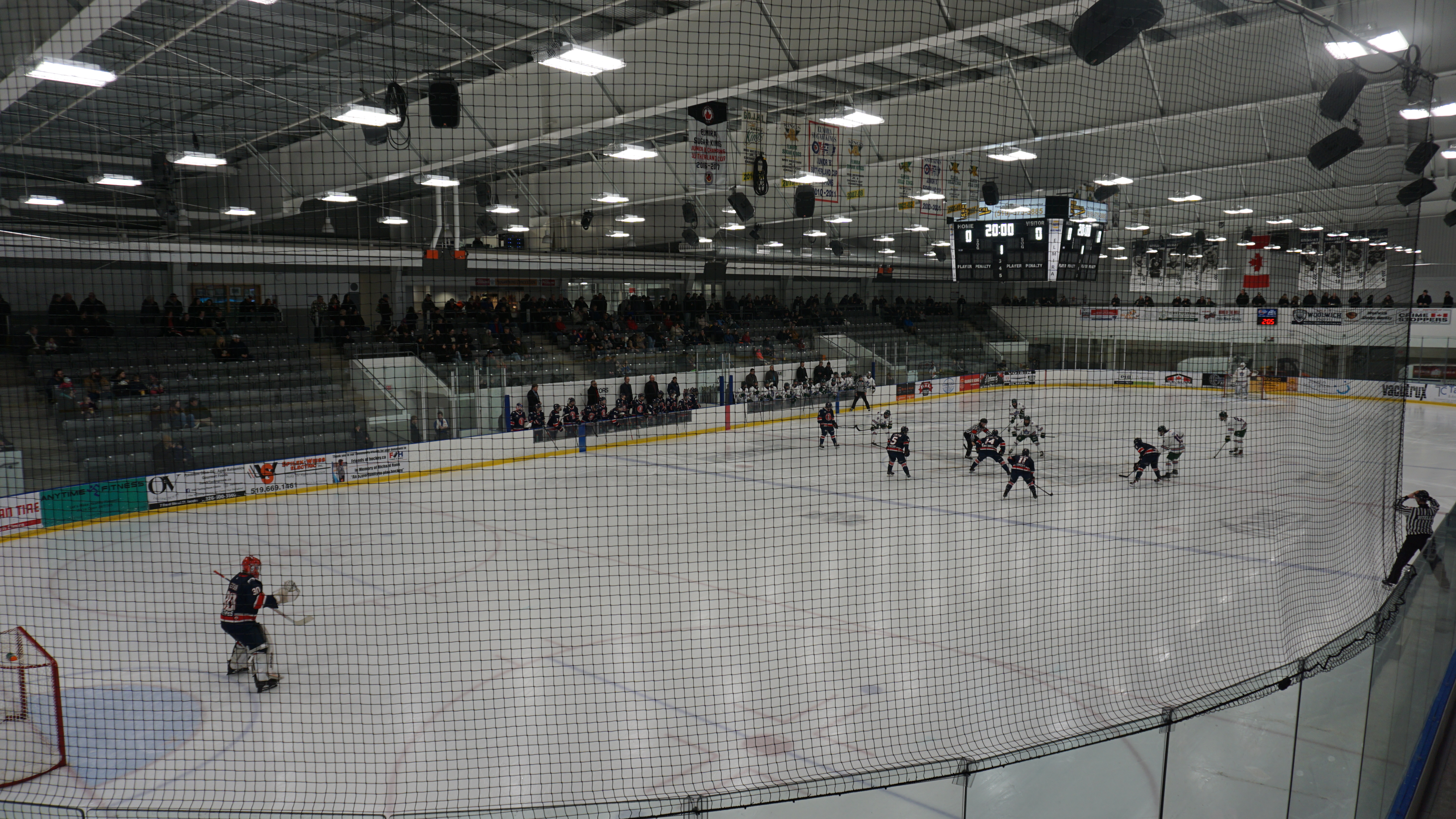
The Dan Snyder Memorial Arena

Since 2009, the Dan Snyder Memorial Arena has been home to the Elmira Sugar Kings, located within the Woolwich Memorial Centre (WMC). Making it one of the newer arena's within the GOHL. The arena was named in honour of Elmira native and NHL player Dan Snyder, who died in 2003.

The facility features an NHL-sized ice surface with a spectator seating capacity of 1,300, expanding to approximately 2,000 including standing-room areas, frequently hosting one of the highest average attendances in the GOHL. The arena's design includes eight rows of stadium seating on both the east and west sides, with an overlooking concourse level that features a walking track.

The Woolwich Memorial Centre maintains a strong connection to Elmira's history through the "hanging of the banners". In recent years, most notably during the team's special ceremony in September 2024, the town honoured its alumni by raising commemorative banners to the rafters, recognizing local hockey stars and former NHL players who graduated from the program. Notable names include Larry Huras, Ric Seiling, Rod Seiling, Darryl Sittler, Dan Snyder, Cam Stewart, Mark Vines, Dennis Wideman & Jamie Wright.

=== Fan experience ===
The game-day experience at the Dan Snyder Memorial Arena is a central component of the Elmira Sugar Kings' identity as a community-owned, non-profit organization. Home games frequently incorporate long-standing local traditions such as the "Chuck-a-Puck" events, often held in conjunction with minor hockey programs. A signature community event is the annual "Charity Jersey Auction," where the team wears specialty uniforms that are auctioned post-game to benefit local initiatives, such as the Woolwich Counselling Centre. Promotional partnerships with local businesses are also a staple of the atmosphere, including a long-running "Free Burger" giveaway sponsored by the Elmira Harvey's location, triggered when the Kings score five or more goals in a home contest. As well as the upper-level concourse area, where fans can purchase alcoholic beverages, including the "Always A King" craft brew produced specifically for the team by the local Rural Roots Brewing Company.

=== Presentation ===
The Elmira Sugar Kings are known for one of the most sophisticated game-day presentations in the GOHL, utilizing technology to create a unique game-day experience. In 2024, the club implemented a high-definition on-ice logo projection system and synchronized spotlights during the pre-game introduction. This sequence includes projecting the team's leaf crest directly onto the ice surface as players enter from the tunnel. The team also introduced a specialized "opening hype montage" titled "Sound the Alarm" which was played prior to player introductions, making them one of the first in the GOHL to implement it into the game-day experience. For the 2025-26 Season, a new Opening Hype Montage was created, titled "Kings Never Die". The Sugar Kings' current "goal song" is "Without Me" by Eminem, "win song" is "Right Back Where We Started From" by Maxime Nightingale, with "Ready or Not" by Mischa Chillak as their "powerplay song".

== Sutherland Cup appearances ==
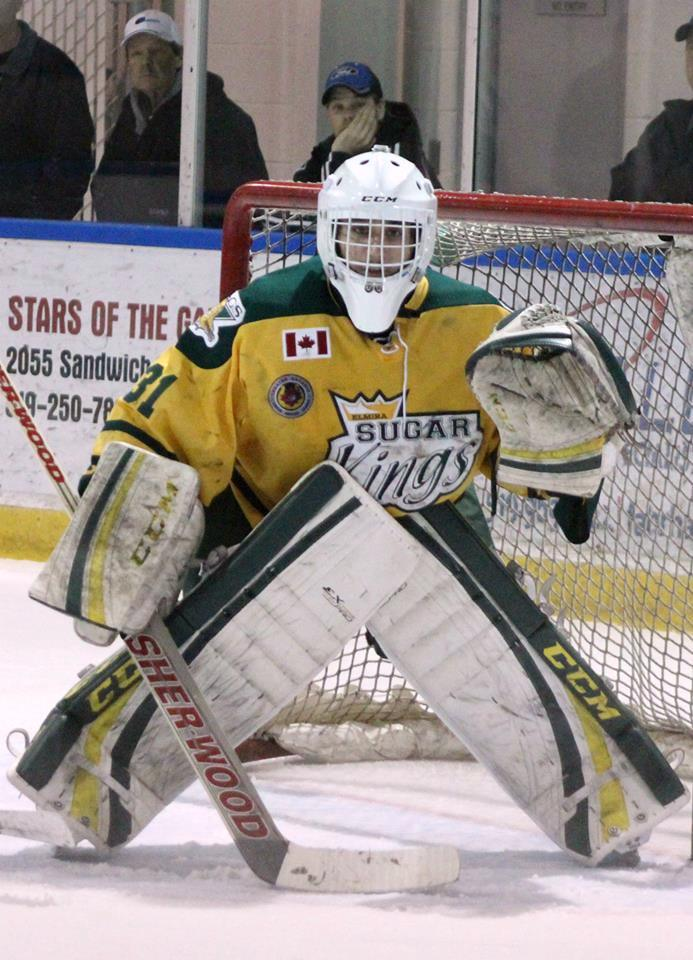
Sugar Kings goalie Jonathan Reinhart during 2015 playoffs

1997: Elmira Sugar Kings defeated St. Catharines Falcons 4-games-to-3
1998: Niagara Falls Canucks defeated Elmira Sugar Kings 4-games-to-3
2001: Elmira Sugar Kings defeated Thorold Blackhawks 4-games-to-2
2002: Sarnia Blast defeated Elmira Sugar Kings 4-games-to-3
2008: Tecumseh Chiefs defeated Elmira Sugar Kings 4-games-to-none
2011: Elmira Sugar Kings defeated Niagara Falls Canucks 4-games-to-1
2017: Elmira Sugar Kings defeated London Nationals 4-games-to-1

== Notable alumni ==
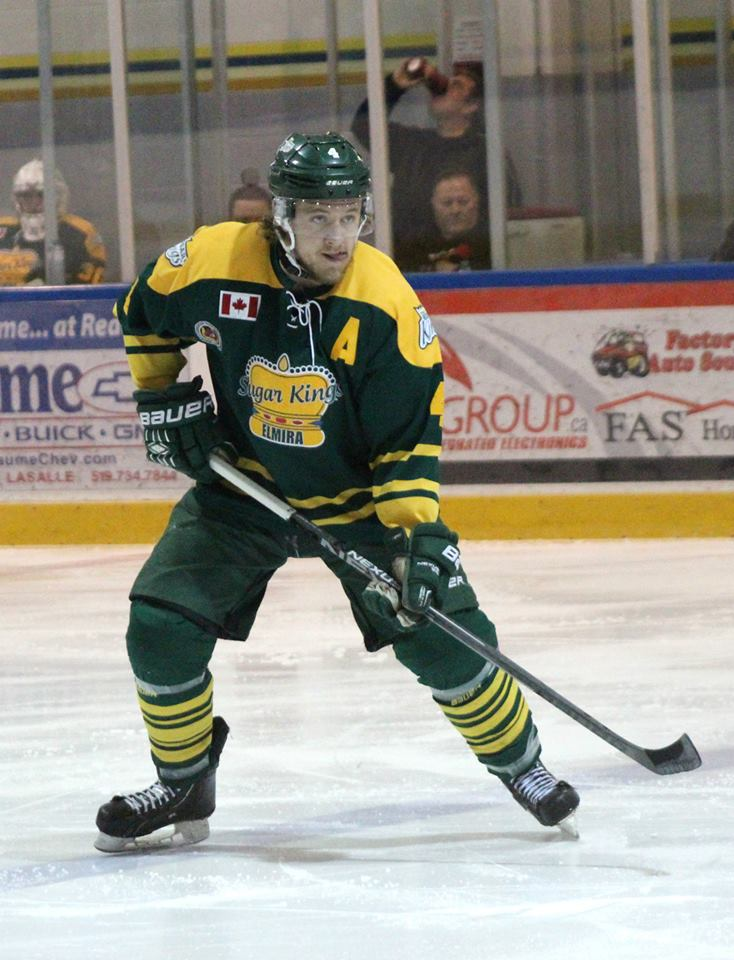
Sugar Kings defenseman Brodie Whitehead during 2015 playoffs

- Darryl Sittler
- Ric Seiling
- Rod Seiling
- Dan Snyder
- Jamie Wright
- Dennis Wideman
- Cam Stewart
- Mackenzie Blackwood
- Kyle Rank
- Garrett Rank
- Tyler Brenner
- Derek Hahn
- Rob Collins
- Jeff Snyder
- Kevin Bloch
- Marc Potvin
- Adam Brubacher
- Mitch Hoelscher
