= Niagara District Junior B Hockey League =

The Niagara District Junior B Hockey League was a Canadian Junior ice hockey league in the Golden Horseshoe of Ontario from 1954 until 1979. The league was a part of the Ontario Hockey Association of the Canadian Amateur Hockey Association and was eligible for the Sutherland Cup.

== History ==
The Niagara District Junior B Hockey League was founded in 1957. In 1974, many teams in the area broke off and formed the Golden Horseshoe Junior Hockey League. The Niagara District League survived until 1979, when it was divided between the Golden Horseshoe League and the Niagara & District Junior C Hockey League.

== Teams ==
- Burlington Mohawks
- Dunnville Terriers
- Fort Erie Meteors
- Hamilton Mountain Bees
- Niagara Falls Canucks
- Niagara-on-the-Lake Lakers
- Port Colborne Sailors
- St. Catharines Falcons
- Simcoe Storm
- Stamford Bruins
- Thorold Paper Bees
- Welland Cougars

== Niagara District Champions ==
- 1958 Welland Brookies
- 1959 St. Catharines Falcons
- 1960 St. Catharines Falcons
- 1961 Welland Brookies
- 1962
- 1963 Burlington Mohawks
- 1964 Burlington Mohawks
- 1965 Hamilton Bees
- 1966 Hamilton Bees
- 1967 Stamford Bruins
- 1968 Thorold Jaycees
- 1969 Hamilton Mountain Bees
- 1970 Hamilton Mountain Bees
- 1971 Hamilton Mountain Bees
- 1972 St. Catharines Falcons
- 1973 Hamilton Mountain Bees
- 1974 Hamilton Red Wings
- 1975 Niagara Falls Canucks
- 1976 Niagara Falls Canucks
- 1977 Niagara Falls Canucks
- 1978 Welland Cougars
- 1979 Fort Erie Meteors
