= Belleville Bobcats =

Canadian junior ice hockey team

- City: Belleville, Ontario
- League: Metro Junior B Hockey League
- Operated: 1972-1989
- Home arena: Trenton Community Gardens
- Colours: Red, Black, and White

Franchise history
- 1946-1950: Belleville Rockets
- 1950-1951: Belleville Snowmen
- 1951-19xx: Belleville Blackhawks
- 19xx-1963: Belleville McFarlands
- 1963-1970: Belleville Mohawks
- 1972-1981: Belleville Bobcats
- 1981-1987: Trenton Bobcats
- 1987-1989: Belleville Bobcats
- 1989-present: Wellington Dukes (merged)

The Belleville Bobcats were a Junior "B" ice hockey team. The Bobcats played in the Metro Junior B Hockey League.

== History ==
The Belleville Bobcats were first formed in 1972 as a member of the Metro Junior "B" league. In 1980 the team won the Metro Championship. With the founding of the OHL's Belleville Bulls, the Bobcats moved west to Trenton, and became the Trenton Bobcats. However, after uneven performance while in Trenton, the team returned to Belleville in 1987. After two seasons, the Bobcats moved to Wellington in 1989 and merged into the Wellington Dukes. The Bobcats were Metro "B" Champions and Sutherland Cup All-Ontario Junior "B" Champions in 1980. This team was owned and operated by Vern Nutley.

== Season-by-season results ==
Season	GP	W	L	T	GF	GA	P	Results	Playoffs
1960-61	20	12	4	4	--	--	28	3rd EJBHL	
1961-62	22	17	5	0	165	80	34	1st EJBHL	
1962-63	19	7	11	1	58	93	15	6th EJBHL	
1963-64	8; 16	0; 7	7; 8	1; 1	18; 84	54; 70	1; 15	3rd EJBHL; 4th EJCHL	
1964-65	7; 15	3; 8	4; 6	0; 1	-- 70	-- 64	6; 17	3rd EJBHL; 4th EJCHL	
1965-66	28	12	16	0	113	145	28	5th EJBHL	
1966-67	Statistics Not Available								
1967-68	32	3	27	2	107	249	8	5th EJBHL	
1968-69	30	4	24	2	--	--	10	6th EJBHL	
1969-70	30	11	16	3	90	169	25	4th EJBHL	
1970-71	30	11	14	5	113	140	27	4th EJBHL	
1971-72	Statistics Not Available								
1972-73	33	14	14	5	168	161	33	5th Metro B	
1973-74	44	28	12	4	269	186	60	3rd Metro B	
1974-75	38	17	18	3	192	222	37	9th Metro B	
1975-76	34	22	9	3	207	157	47	2nd Metro B	
1976-77	34	14	14	6	169	177	34	9th Metro B	
1977-78	36	17	14	5	197	181	39	6th Metro B	
1978-79	44	25	15	4	278	246	54	5th Metro B	
1979-80	42	26	7	9	222	160	59	2nd Metro B	Won League, won SC
1980-81	41	20	15	6	180	157	46	5th Metro B	
1981-82	36	19	9	8	178	150	46	4th Metro B	
1982-83	35	22	9	4	161	126	48	2nd Metro B	
1983-84	42	20	19	3	200	207	43	6th Metro B	
1984-85	36	14	20	2	176	193	30	9th Metro B	DNQ
1985-86	37	6	27	4	153	263	16	12th Metro B	DNQ
1986-87	38	1	33	4	115	264	6	12th Metro B	DNQ
1987-88	37	20	15	2	187	144	42	6th Metro B	Lost quarter-final
1988-89	40	13	19	8	169	197	34	8th Metro B	
1989-90	Merged with Wellington Dukes								

== Sutherland Cup appearances ==
1980: Belleville Bobcats defeated Windsor Bulldogs 4-games-to-none
