= Sarnia Legionnaires (GOJHL) =

- City: Sarnia, Ontario
- League: Greater Ontario Hockey League
- Conference: Western
- Founded: 1969
- Home arena: Pat Stapleton Arena (capacity: 2,200)
- Colours: Black, red and white
- General manager: Tate Philips
- Head coach: Ryan Foster
- Affiliates: Sarnia Sting (OHL)

Franchise history
- 1969-1995: Sarnia Bees
- 1995-1999: Sarnia Steeplejacks
- 1999-2001: Sarnia Steeplejack-Bees
- 2001-2008: Sarnia Blast
- 2008-Present: Sarnia Legionnaires

The Sarnia Legionnaires are a junior ice hockey team based in Sarnia, Ontario, Canada. They play in the Western division of the Greater Ontario Hockey League.

== History ==
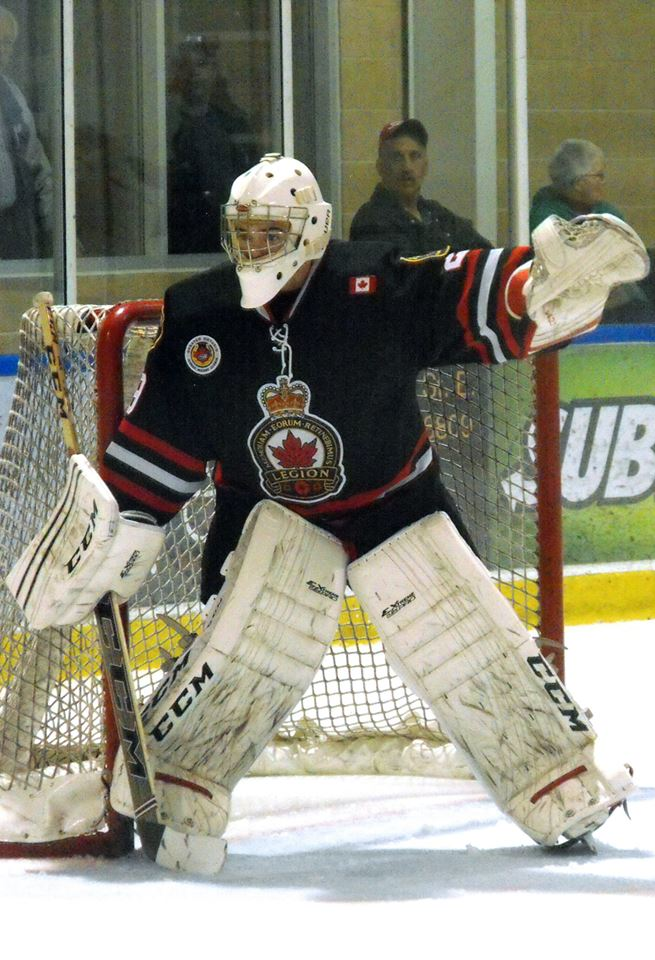
Sarnia goalie in 2014.

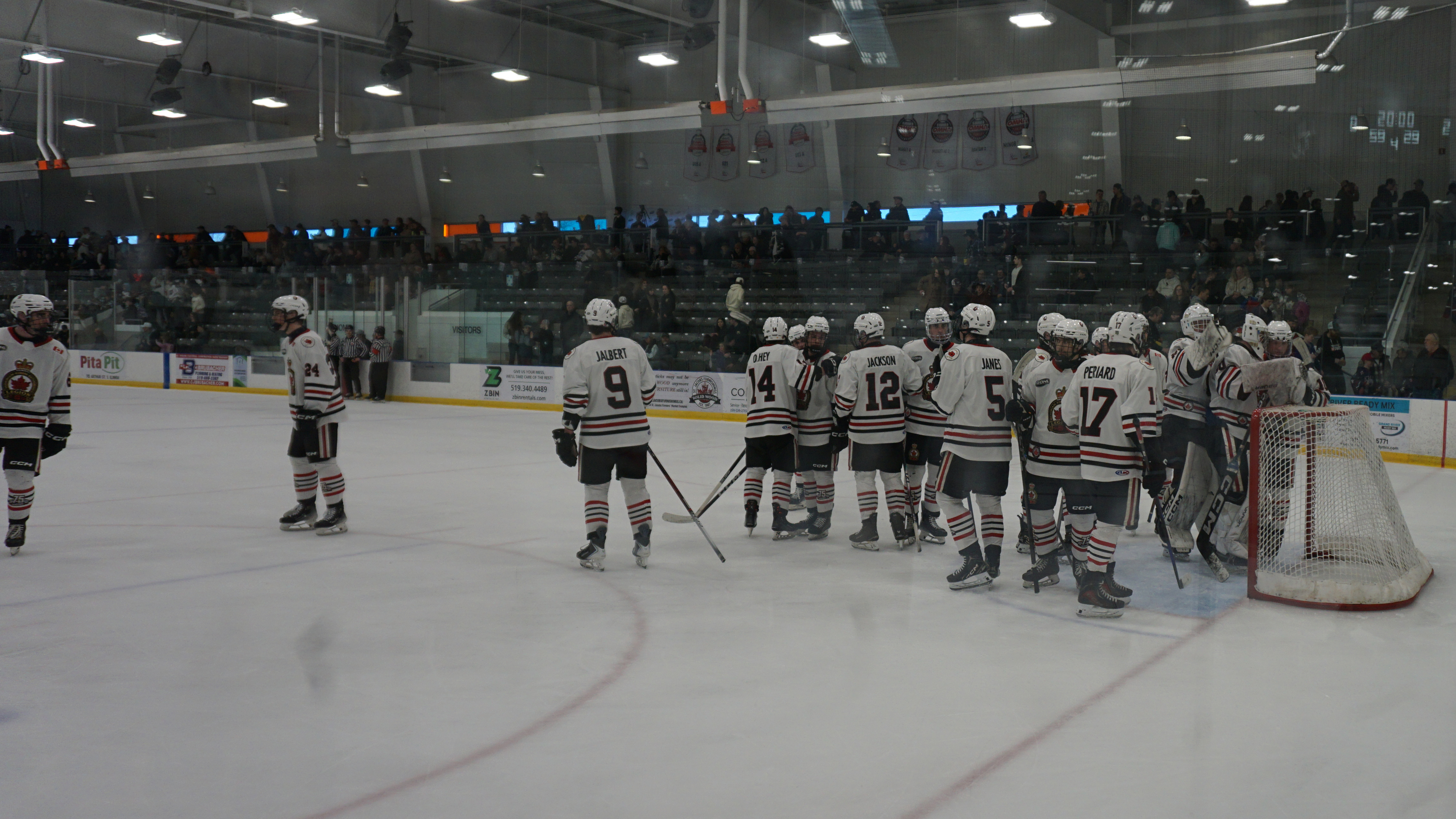
Sarnia Legionnaires after their 0-50 Game

The Sarnia Bees joined the ranks of the current Western Junior "B" league in 1969. The Bees were an upstart team in direct competition with the historic Sarnia Legionnaires of the Western Ontario Junior A Hockey League. By mid-season, the Bees had stolen away most of the Legionnaires fan base and the team was forced to fold.

Over the next quarter century the Bees had some good teams but the club seldom lived up to the legend of the Sarnia Legionnaires.

After dominating the Western Ontario Junior B Hockey League during the 1970–71 season, the Bees elected to jump to the Legionnaires' old league, the Southern Ontario Junior A Hockey League, but the adventure was not overly successful and the Bees returned to the WOJHL the next season. Their experience in Junior A seemingly fueled the Bees during the 1972–73 season as they won the WOJHL championship and went on to defeat the Metro Junior B Hockey League's Toronto Nationals 4-games-to-2 to win Sarnia's first Sutherland Cup since the Sarnia Legionnaires did it in 1968.

In 1983, the Bees were again WOJBHL champions and pushed all the way to the Sutherland Cup finals. In the final, they met the Metro Junior B Hockey League's St. Michael's Buzzers. After a long battle, the Buzzers finished off the Bees in game 7 to deny the franchise of its second Sutherland Cup.

In 1995, it saw the arrival of an Ontario Hockey League known as the Sarnia Sting to the city. To stay out of the shadow of the OHL team, the Bees changed their name to the Steeplejacks. After another couple name changes, the Sarnia franchise became the Sarnia Blast in 2001. The team is a long-standing member of the Western Junior "B" league (WOHL).

In 2002, the Blast won the WOHL championship and qualified for the Sutherland Cup final. In the final they met the Mid-Western Junior B Hockey League's Elmira Sugar Kings. The series went the distance, but the Blast prevailed in game 7 of the series and brought the Sutherland Cup back to Sarnia for the seventh time and the first time in 29 years.

In 2008, the ownership of the Sarnia Blast was transferred to a consortium of local individuals. In memory of the fabled Sarnia Legionnaires of old, the new owners and the local Royal Canadian Legion allowed for the current team to resurrect the name. The new owners said they will put pictures of the original Legionnaires in their dressing room, hoping that will inspire today's young players.

In their first year back under the Legionnaire name after a 38-year absence, the club finished first in the Western Conference of the Greater Ontario Hockey League. In the playoffs, they won the conference championship by eliminating the St. Thomas Stars 4–1 in games, taking out the Strathroy Rockets 4–3 in games and ousting the London Nationals 4–2 in games to win the Weir Cup.

Tyler Cicchini led the way, scoring 18 goals in 22 post season games. That was one more than the record of 17 playoff goals Don Gordon of the original Legionnaires set in the spring of 1968.

The team set a league record in the 2009 playoffs when it scored three goals in 14 seconds in a game against Strathroy.

Sarnia Jr. 'B' hockey teams named the Legionnaires have now won six Western Ontario championships in 17 years of action, along with four Sutherland Cups.

When head coach Brian Irwin departed the Legionnaires before the 2025–26 season, several veteran players followed suit; as a result, the Legionnaires featured 20 rookie players under new head coach Mike Bondy, with many of them 16 or 17 years of age. The team ultimately made dubious history when they finished with a 0–50–0 record, becoming the first team in the GOHL to finish with a winless season since the league's 2007 founding; they also became the worst team ever fielded in Junior B hockey history by surpassing the record for most losses held by the 1997–98 Ohsweken Golden Eagles, who went 0–47–1.

== 2026-27 hockey operations ==
- General Manager - Tate Philips
- Head coach - Ryan Foster
- Associate coach -
- Assistant coach -
- Goalie Coach -
- Equipment Manager - Dave Anger
- Assistant Equipment Manager - Ty Simmons
- Scout - Chris Jones
- Scout - Garry Jordan
- Scout - Tim Coleman

== Season-by-season results ==
Season	GP	W	L	T	OTL	GF	GA	P	Results	Playoffs
1969-70	36	19	12	5	-	199	158	43	2nd WOJHL	
1970-71	42	32	8	2	-	263	143	66	1st WOJHL	
1971-72	56	15	31	10	-	158	200	40	8th SOJAHL	
1972-73	41	34	3	4	-	289	144	72	1st WOJHL	Won League; Won SC
1973-74	40	31	6	3	-	275	144	65	1st WOJHL	Won League
1974-75	40	22	13	5	-	202	161	49	1st WOJHL	
1975-76	40	26	10	4	-	272	183	56	2nd WOJHL	
1976-77	40	19	13	8	-	208	158	46	2nd WOJHL	Won League
1977-78	40	18	17	5	-	213	208	41	3rd WOJHL	
1978-79	42	20	18	4	-	242	266	44	4th WOJHL	
1979-80	42	25	12	5	-	246	163	55	3rd WOJHL	
1980-81	42	26	10	6	-	236	170	58	2nd WOJHL	
1981-82	42	36	4	2	-	290	138	74	1st WOJHL	Won League
1982-83	42	22	14	6	-	204	172	50	3rd WOJHL	Lost final
1983-84	48	32	10	6	-	262	172	70	2nd WOJHL	Lost final
1984-85	48	30	15	3	-	266	211	63	3rd WOJHL	
1985-86	42	25	16	1	-	257	196	51	3rd WOJHL	
1986-87	42	26	11	5	-	268	192	57	3rd WOJHL	
1987-88	42	25	13	4	0	215	158	54	3rd WOJHL	Won League
1988-89	42	34	8	0	0	312	150	68	1st WOJHL	Won League
1989-90	39	34	3	1	1	292	147	70	1st WOJHL	Lost final
1990-91	48	33	14	1	0	255	185	67	3rd WOJHL	Lost final
1991-92	50	27	18	4	1	233	221	59	3rd WOJHL West	
1992-93	52	37	12	3	0	-	-	77	1st WOJHL West	Won League
1993-94	51	30	19	2	0	295	242	62	2nd WOJHL West	
1994-95	52	22	27	0	3	236	237	47	3rd WOJHL West	
1995-96	52	22	23	6	1	229	231	51	4th WOJHL West	
1996-97	52	11	36	1	4	175	281	27	5th WOJHL West	
1997-98	52	18	28	3	3	171	233	42	5th WOJHL West	
1998-99	52	11	35	0	6	144	256	28	5th WOJHL West	
1999-00	54	37	13	0	4	228	161	78	2nd GOHL	
2000-01	54	34	18	1	1	220	172	70	4th GOHL	
2001-02	54	36	15	1	2	274	190	75	3rd WOJHL	Won League; Won SC
2002-03	48	34	12	1	1	250	161	70	2nd WOJHL	Lost final
2003-04	48	32	10	0	6	215	151	70	1st WOJHL	
2004-05	48	28	13	3	4	193	150	63	3rd WOJHL	
2005-06	48	23	22	0	3	171	181	49	6th WOJHL	Lost quarter-final
2006-07	48	31	12	-	5	225	180	67	2nd WOJHL	Lost final
2007-08	48	26	19	-	3	158	149	55	5th GOJHL-W	Lost quarter-final
2008-09	52	37	11	-	4	228	158	78	1st GOJHL-W	Lost semi-final RR
2009-10	50	21	23	-	6	174	176	48	6th GOJHL-W	Lost Conf. QF
2010-11	51	24	24	-	3	198	208	51	7th GOJHL-W	Lost Conf. QF
2011-12	51	32	14	-	5	241	178	69	1st GOJHL-W	Lost Conf. SF
2012-13	51	22	20	-	9	197	195	53	7th GOJHL-W	Lost Conf. QF
2013-14	49	29	18	-	2	217	184	60	4th GOJHL-W	Lost Conf. QF
2014-15	49	33	15	-	1	230	179	67	3rd GOJHL-W	Won Conf. Quarter, 4-2 (St. Thomas); Lost Conf. Semi, 2-4 (Lasalle)
2015-16	50	23	22	2	3	157	186	51	5th of 9-W; 19th of 26	Lost Conf. Quarter, 3-4 (Lasalle)
2016-17	50	22	22	0	6	163	182	50	6th of 9-W; 15th of 27	Lost Conf. Quarter, 2-4 (Leamington)
2017-18	50	29	15	1	5	204	173	64	4th of 9-W; 10th of 26	Lost Conf. Quarter, 1-4 (St. Thomas)
2018-19	48	23	18	2	5	157	168	53	4th of 9-W; 13th of 26	Lost Conf. Quarter, 0-4 (Lasalle)
2019-20	50	19	29	1	3	137	222	42	8th of 9-W; 19th of 26	Lost Conf. Quarter, 0-4 (London)
2020-21	Season cancelled due to pandemic									
2021-22	48	11	35	1	1	122	220	24	9th of 9-W; 23rd of 25	Did not qualify for post season
2022-23	50	11	32	6	1	153	275	29	8th of 9-W; 21st of 25	Lost Conf. Quarter, 0-4 (Leamington)
2023-24	50	17	27	4	2	176	249	40	7th of 8-W; 17th of 23	Lost Conf. Quarter, 0-4 (Lincoln)
2024-25	50	17	29	3	1	183	225	38	10th of 12-West; 19th of 23	Did not qualify for post season
2025-26	50	0	50	0	0	83	341	0	12th of 12-West; 23rd of 23	Did not qualify for post season

=== Playoffs ===
SOJHL Years

- 1972 DNQ

== Sutherland Cup appearances ==
1973: Sarnia Bees defeated Toronto Nationals 4-games-to-2
1982: St. Michael's Buzzers defeated Sarnia Bees 4-games-to-3
2002: Sarnia Blast defeated Elmira Sugar Kings 4-games-to-3

== Professional alumni ==
- Frank Beaton
- Jerry Butler
- Dino Ciccarelli
- Mike Crombeen
- Mike Dark
- Scott Garland
- Matt Martin
- Tony McKegney
- Robbie Moore
- Mike Murray
- Rumun Ndur
- Kraig Nienhuis
