= 1997–98 Alabama–Huntsville Chargers men's ice hockey season =

American college ice hockey team season

1997–98 Alabama–Huntsville Chargers men's ice hockey

NCAA Division II National Champions

NCAA Championship Series, W 6–2, 5–2 vs. Bemidji State
- Conference: Independent
- Record: 24–3–3
- Head coach: Doug Ross (16th season)
- Assistant coach: A. J. Baker, Lance West, Mike Quenneville
- Home stadium: Von Braun Center

The 1997–98 Alabama–Huntsville Chargers ice hockey team represented the University of Alabama in Huntsville in the 1997–98 NCAA Division II men's hockey season, winning the national championship. It was the school's second NCAA national championship, following the 1995–96 season. The team was coached by Doug Ross and played their home games at the Von Braun Center.

The team completed the regular season with 22 wins, 3 losses, and 3 ties. UAH was then invited to play the Bemidji State Beavers in a two-game series to determine the Division II National Championship at Huntsville's Von Braun Center. The Chargers would take the championship after a 6–2 victory on March 13 and a 5–2 victory the following day.

== Roster ==
No.	Nat.	Player	Class	Pos	Height	Weight	DoB	Hometown	Previous team
1		Cédrick Billequey	Junior	G	6' 0" (1.83 m)	170 lb (77 kg)	1975-03-10	Montreal, Quebec
2		Shane Stewart	Sophomore	D	6' 1" (1.85 m)	190 lb (86 kg)	1975-06-17	New Liskeard, Ontario	Stratford (MWJHL)
3		Dave Marcelli	Freshman	D	6' 2" (1.88 m)	205 lb (93 kg)		King City, Ontario	Caledon (MetJHL)
5		Jim Alauria	Junior	D	6' 2" (1.88 m)	210 lb (95 kg)	1975-05-04	Phoenix, Arizona	Illinois–Chicago (NCAA)
6		Tim McAllister	Freshman	D	5' 10" (1.78 m)	180 lb (82 kg)		Kingston, Ontario	SUNY Canton (NJCAA)
7		Marc Lalonde	Sophomore	D	6' 1" (1.85 m)	170 lb (77 kg)		Cambridge, Ontario
8		Ryan Gavigan	Freshman	RW	5' 11" (1.8 m)	180 lb (82 kg)		Sarnia, Ontario	Petrolia (WOHL)
9		Joe Provenzano	Junior	D	6' 1" (1.85 m)	185 lb (84 kg)	1975-03-29	Grosse Pointe, Michigan	Des Moines (USHL)
10		Darren Awender	Senior	C	5' 8" (1.73 m)	170 lb (77 kg)		St. Clair Beach, Ontario	Leamington (WOHL)
11		Nathan Bowen	Sophomore	LW	6' 0" (1.83 m)	190 lb (86 kg)	1975-09-03	London, Ontario	Petrolia (WOHL)
12		Tom Williams	Sophomore	RW	5' 9" (1.75 m)	175 lb (79 kg)		Windsor, Ontario	Leamington (WOHL)
14		Matt Parker	Senior	LW	5' 11" (1.8 m)	180 lb (82 kg)	1975-07-28	Huntsville, Alabama
15		Paul Schloss	Junior	LW	5' 10" (1.78 m)	195 lb (88 kg)		Livonia, Michigan
16		Dwayne Blais	Freshman	C	5' 9" (1.75 m)	175 lb (79 kg)	1977-07-12	London, Ontario	Markham (MetJHL)
17		Jay Woodcroft	Sophomore	C	6' 1" (1.85 m)	180 lb (82 kg)	1976-08-11	Toronto, Ontario	Markham (MetJHL)
18		Mark Motowski	Junior	D	6' 3" (1.91 m)	230 lb (104 kg)	1974-10-13	Dearborn, Michigan	Illinois–Chicago (NCAA)
19		Mike Hamlin	Junior	RW	6' 0" (1.83 m)	180 lb (82 kg)		Flint, Michigan
20		Coiln Schmidt	Freshman	LW	6' 0" (1.83 m)	205 lb (93 kg)	1976-01-15	Stratford, Ontario	Stratford (MWJHL)
21		Ryan McCormack	Freshman	C	6' 0" (1.83 m)	175 lb (79 kg)	1978-03-04	Thunder Bay, Ontario	Portage (MJHL)
22		Jamie Baby	Junior	C	6' 1" (1.85 m)	180 lb (82 kg)		Parry Sound, Ontario	Muskoka (MetJHL)
23		Jason Mucciarone	Senior	D	6' 2" (1.88 m)	188 lb (85 kg)	1974-10-11	Milford, Massachusetts
25		John McCabe	Senior	LW	6' 4" (1.93 m)	220 lb (100 kg)	1974-05-30	Espanola, Ontario
27		Ryan Stewart	Junior	RW	5' 10" (1.78 m)	180 lb (82 kg)		Bowmanville, Ontario	Danville (NAHL)
30		Steve Briere	Sophomore	G	5' 8" (1.73 m)	170 lb (77 kg)	1977-03-25	Winnipeg, Manitoba	Sioux City (USHL)
		Derek Young	Sophomore	D	6' 1" (1.85 m)	204 lb (93 kg)	1976-04-09	Whitby, Ontario	Markham (MetJHL)

== Season ==
=== Schedule ===
Date	Opponent	Site	Result	Attendance	Record
Regular Season
October 24	Oswego State*	Von Braun Center • Huntsville, Alabama	W 5–1	1,899	1–0–0
October 25	Oswego State*	Von Braun Center • Huntsville, Alabama	L 3–5	1,800	1–1–0
November 7	Sacred Heart*	Von Braun Center • Huntsville, Alabama	W 9–1	2,009	2–1–0
November 8	Sacred Heart*	Von Braun Center • Huntsville, Alabama	W 23–4	2,359	3–1–0
November 21	at Findlay*	Clauss Ice Arena • Findlay, Ohio	W 7–2	390	4–1–0
November 22	at Findlay*	Clauss Ice Arena • Findlay, Ohio	W 8–1	315	5–1–0
November 28	Norwich*	Von Braun Center • Huntsville, Alabama	W 11–1	2,046	6–1–0
November 29	Norwich*	Von Braun Center • Huntsville, Alabama	W 8–3	2,009	7–1–0
December 12	Findlay*	Von Braun Center • Huntsville, Alabama	W 3–2	1,847	8–1–0
December 13	Findlay*	Von Braun Center • Huntsville, Alabama	W 6–1	1,020	9–1–0
December 19	RIT*	Von Braun Center • Huntsville, Alabama	T 3–3 ^{OT}	1,533	9–1–1
December 20	RIT*	Von Braun Center • Huntsville, Alabama	W 10–0	1,205	10–1–1
January 2	Connecticut*	Von Braun Center • Huntsville, Alabama	W 5–1	1,533	11–1–1
January 3	Connecticut*	Von Braun Center • Huntsville, Alabama	W 4–1	2,004	12–1–1
January 9	UMass–Dartmouth*	Von Braun Center • Huntsville, Alabama	W 7–3	2,586	13–1–1
January 10	UMass–Dartmouth*	Von Braun Center • Huntsville, Alabama	W 8–2	1,016	14–1–1
January 16	Air Force*	Von Braun Center • Huntsville, Alabama	W 6–1	2,837	15–1–1
January 17	Air Force*	Von Braun Center • Huntsville, Alabama	W 3–0	2,805	16–1–1
January 24	Nebraska–Omaha*	Von Braun Center • Huntsville, Alabama	L 3–5	1,821	16–2–1
January 25	Nebraska–Omaha*	Von Braun Center • Huntsville, Alabama	T 3–3 ^{OT}	1,503	16–2–2
January 30	Bentley*	Von Braun Center • Huntsville, Alabama	W 8–4	2,896	17–2–2
January 31	Bentley*	Von Braun Center • Huntsville, Alabama	W 7–2	1,289	18–2–2
February 7	Concordia (MN)*	Von Braun Center • Huntsville, Alabama	W 4–2	2,001	19–2–2
February 8	Concordia (MN)*	Von Braun Center • Huntsville, Alabama	W 9–1	3,257	20–2–2
February 20	at Nebraska–Omaha*	Omaha Civic Auditorium • Omaha, Nebraska	T 2–2 ^{OT}	8,314	20–2–3
February 20	at Nebraska–Omaha*	Omaha Civic Auditorium • Omaha, Nebraska	L 0–4 ^{OT}	8,314	20–3–3
February 27	Iona*	Von Braun Center • Huntsville, Alabama	W 16–1	2,589	21–3–3
February 28	Iona*	Von Braun Center • Huntsville, Alabama	W 16–1	1,578	22–3–3
NCAA Championship Series
March 13	Bemidji State*	Von Braun Center • Huntsville, Alabama (NCAA Championship Series)	W 6–2	4,103	23–3–3
March 14	Bemidji State*	Von Braun Center • Huntsville, Alabama (NCAA Championship Series)	W 5–2	5,884	24–3–3
*Non-conference game. Sources:

=== Skaters ===
Player	Pos	Yr	GP	G	A	Pts	PIM	PPG	SHG	GWG
Mike Hamlin	RW	Jr	30	27	25	52	34	8	0	4
John McCabe	LW	Sr	30	16	32	48	54	3	0	1
Matt Parker	LW	Sr	30	19	24	43	92	6	2	3
Jay Woodcroft	C	So	30	17	25	42	43	6	0	1
Nathan Bowen	LW	So	29	15	22	37	46	3	0	1
Jamie Baby	C	Jr	27	13	18	31	40	4	1	0
Tom Williams	RW	So	17	13	12	25	41	5	1	3
Shane Stewart	D	So	29	9	16	25	96	1	0	2
Colin Schmidt	LW	Fr	26	13	11	24	16	1	1	2
Ryan McCormack	C	Fr	27	7	16	23	34	1	0	0
Marc Lalonde	D	So	30	6	17	23	26	2	2	1
Jim Aluaria	D	Jr	28	4	17	21	91	2	0	0
Mark Motowski	D	Jr	30	7	12	19	26	2	0	0
Ryan Stewart	RW	Jr	28	10	6	16	14	0	0	3
Joe Provenzano	D	Jr	27	5	9	14	44	2	0	1
Ryan Gavigan	RW	Fr	18	9	4	13	24	0	0	1
Darren Awender	C	Sr	26	4	9	13	34	0	0	1
Paul Schloss	LW	Jr	28	4	9	13	20	0	1	0
Tim McAllister	D	Fr	28	2	10	12	22	0	0	0
Dwayne Blais	C	Fr	11	1	7	8	10	0	0	0
Jason Mucciarone	D	Sr	4	0	3	3	4	0	0	0
Cédrick Billequey	G	Jr	21	0	3	3	10	0	0	0
Derek Young	D	So	4	0	1	1	2	0	0	0
Dave Marcelli	D	Fr	4	0	1	1	0	0	0	0
Steve Briere	G	So	12	0	1	1	2	0	0	0
Team			30	201	310	511	815	46	8	24

==== Goaltenders ====
Player	Yr	GP	TOI	W	L	T	GA	GAA	SV%	SO
Cédrick Billequey	Jr	21	1207:51	17	1	1	36	1.79	.929	0
Steve Briere	So	12	591:09	7	2	2	26	2.64	.885	0
