= 2004–05 Alabama–Huntsville Chargers men's ice hockey season =

American college ice hockey team season

2004–05 Alabama–Huntsville Chargers men's ice hockey
- Conference: College Hockey America
- Record: 18–10–4 (14–5–1 CHA)
- Head coach: Doug Ross (23rd season)
- Captains: Jared Ross; Jeremy Schreiber
- Home stadium: Von Braun Center

The 2004–05 Alabama–Huntsville Chargers ice hockey team represented the University of Alabama in Huntsville in the 2004–05 NCAA Division I men's ice hockey season. The Chargers were coached by Doug Ross who was in his twenty-third season as head coach. The Chargers played their home games in the Von Braun Center and were members of the College Hockey America conference.

== Roster ==
No.	Nat.	Player	Class	Pos	Height	Weight	DoB	Hometown	Previous team
2		Matt Montes	Freshman	D	6' 1" (1.85 m)	195 lb (88 kg)	1983-07-01	Forest Park, Illinois	Springfield (NAHL)
3		Brett McConnachie	Sophomore	RW	5' 11" (1.8 m)	185 lb (84 kg)	1985-03-01	Ajax, Ontario	Wexford (OJHL)
4		Jeremy Schreiber (C)	Junior	D	6' 1" (1.85 m)	200 lb (91 kg)	1981-07-04	Medicine Hat, Alberta	Canmore (AJHL)
5		Ryan Brown	Senior	D	6' 1" (1.85 m)	200 lb (91 kg)	1980-03-26	Chatham, Ontario	Chatham (GOJHL)
6		A.J. Larivee	Sophomore	D	6' 1" (1.85 m)	205 lb (93 kg)	1983-12-19	Dublin, Ontario	St. Marys (WOHL)
7		Jared Ross (C)	Senior	C	5' 9" (1.75 m)	165 lb (75 kg)	1982-09-18	Huntsville, Alabama	Catholic Central HS (USHS–MI)
8		Mike Salekin	Freshman	D	6' 1" (1.85 m)	185 lb (84 kg)	1985-08-17	Castlegar, British Columbia	Merritt (BCHL)
9		Dominik Rozman	Sophomore	LW	5' 11" (1.8 m)	190 lb (86 kg)	1983-03-10	Wallaceburg, Ontario	Sarnia (GOJHL)
10		Doug Watkins	Senior	D	5' 10" (1.78 m)	190 lb (86 kg)	1980-08-20	Kelowna, British Columbia	Weyburn (SJHL)
11		Denny Reagan	Freshman	LW	6' 1" (1.85 m)	200 lb (91 kg)	1983-06-29	St. Louis, Missouri	Texas (NAHL)
12		Tyler Hilbert	Freshman	LW	5' 9" (1.75 m)	185 lb (84 kg)	1984-01-12	Okotoks, Alberta	Olds (AJHL)
13		Bruce Mulherin	Junior	C	6' 1" (1.85 m)	190 lb (86 kg)	1982-02-03	Red Deer, Alberta	Olds (AJHL)
14		Todd Bentley	Junior	LW	5' 10" (1.78 m)	190 lb (86 kg)	1982-01-07	Livonia, Michigan	Cedar Rapids (USHL)
15		Grant Selinger	Sophomore	C	5' 11" (1.8 m)	180 lb (82 kg)	1983-03-22	Regina, Saskatchewan	South Surrey (BCHL)
16		Craig Bushey	Senior	RW	5' 10" (1.78 m)	180 lb (82 kg)	1980-02-27	Ignace, Ontario	Cleveland (NAHL)
18		Steve Canter	Sophomore	RW	6' 1" (1.85 m)	190 lb (86 kg)	1983-06-29	St. Louis, Missouri	Billings (AWHL)
19		Shaun Arvai	Sophomore	D	5' 10" (1.78 m)	170 lb (77 kg)	1982-10-06	West Lorne, Ontario	Petrolia (WOHL)
21		Derek Conter	Freshman	LW	6' 2" (1.88 m)	205 lb (93 kg)	1983-06-10	Toronto, Ontario	Wichita Falls (NAHL)
22		David Nimmo	Sophomore	C	6' 2" (1.88 m)	220 lb (100 kg)	1982-07-25	St. Albert, Alberta	Melfort (SJHL)
23		Keith Rowe	Senior	LW	5' 11" (1.8 m)	190 lb (86 kg)	1981-04-13	Livonia, Michigan	Danville (NAHL)
24		Jeff Winchester	Junior	D	6' 3" (1.91 m)	220 lb (100 kg)	1981-11-06	Dalhousie, New Brunswick	Cornwall (CCHL)
25		Chris Martini	Junior	LW	6' 1" (1.85 m)	185 lb (84 kg)	1982-07-11	Calgary, Alberta	Canmore (AJHL)
26		Luke Flaig	Junior	C	5' 11" (1.8 m)	175 lb (79 kg)	1981-09-18	Eden Prairie, Minnesota	Chicago (USHL)
27		Troy Maney	Sophomore	D	6' 2" (1.88 m)	200 lb (91 kg)	1982-10-04	Huntsville, Alabama	Capital Centre (NAHL)
29		Scott Munroe	Junior	G	6' 2" (1.88 m)	195 lb (88 kg)	1982-01-20	Moose Jaw, Saskatchewan	Notre Dame (SJHL)
30		Paul Gibson	Freshman	G	5' 9" (1.75 m)	170 lb (77 kg)	1986-02-15	St. Thomas, Ontario	St. Thomas (WOHL)
33		Marc Narduzzi	Freshman	G	6' 2" (1.88 m)	190 lb (86 kg)	1982-05-25	Vancouver, British Columbia	South Surrey (BCHL)

== Season ==
=== Schedule ===
Date	Time	Opponent	Site	Decision	Result	Attendance	Record
Exhibition
October 15	7:05 pm	Western Ontario*	Von Braun Center • Huntsville, Alabama	Munroe	W 4–3	1,543	
October 16	7:05 pm	Western Ontario*	Von Braun Center • Huntsville, Alabama	Gibson	L 1–2	1,621	
Regular Season
October 22	7:05 pm	Holy Cross*	Von Braun Center • Huntsville, Alabama	Munroe	L 2–4	1,816	0–1–0
October 23	7:05 pm	Holy Cross*	Von Braun Center • Huntsville, Alabama	Narduzzi	W 4–2	1,563	1–1–0
October 29	6:00 pm	at Yale*	Ingalls Rink • New Haven, Connecticut	Munroe	W 5–2	2,541	2–1–0
October 30	6:00 pm	at Princeton*	Hobey Baker Rink • Princeton, New Jersey	Munroe	T 5–5 ^{OT}	1,087	2–1–1
November 5	5:05 pm	Robert Morris	Von Braun Center • Huntsville, Alabama	Munroe	W 4–1	1,471	3–1–1 (1–0–0)
November 6	4:05 pm	Robert Morris	Von Braun Center • Huntsville, Alabama	Munroe	W 7–2	1,523	4–1–1 (2–0–0)
November 12	8:05 pm	at Air Force	Cadet Ice Arena • Colorado Springs, Colorado	Munroe	W 6–2	1,837	5–1–1 (3–0–0)
November 14	6:05 pm	at Air Force	Cadet Ice Arena • Colorado Springs, Colorado	Munroe	W 4–1	814	6–1–1 (4–0–0)
November 19	7:35 pm	at Minnesota State*	Midwest Wireless Civic Center • Mankato, Minnesota	Munroe	L 2–4	3,103	6–2–1 (4–0–0)
November 20	7:05 pm	at Minnesota State*	Midwest Wireless Civic Center • Mankato, Minnesota	Munroe	T 3–3 ^{OT}	3,457	6–2–2 (4–0–0)
November 27	6:35 pm	at Western Michigan*	Lawson Ice Arena • Kalamazoo, Michigan	Munroe	L 1–5	2,071	6–3–2 (4–0–0)
November 28	2:05 pm	at Western Michigan*	Lawson Ice Arena • Kalamazoo, Michigan	Munroe	L 1–3	1,674	6–4–2 (4–0–0)
December 3	6:05 pm	Niagara	Von Braun Center • Huntsville, Alabama	Munroe	W 5–4	2,876	7–4–2 (5–0–0)
December 4	7:05 pm	Niagara	Von Braun Center • Huntsville, Alabama	Munroe	L 2–3	1,537	7–5–2 (5–1–0)
January 7	5:05 pm	Wayne State	Von Braun Center • Huntsville, Alabama	Munroe	W 3–2	1,503	8–5–2 (6–1–0)
January 8	4:05 pm	Wayne State	Von Braun Center • Huntsville, Alabama	Munroe	T 3–3 ^{OT}	1,711	8–5–3 (6–1–1)
January 14	6:35 pm	at Lake Superior State*	Taffy Abel Arena • Sault Ste. Marie, Michigan	Munroe	T 3–3 ^{OT}	1,692	8–5–4 (6–1–1)
January 15	6:05 pm	at Lake Superior State*	Taffy Abel Arena • Sault Ste. Marie, Michigan	Munroe	W 5–0	2,009	9–5–4 (6–1–1)
January 21	5:05 pm	Bemidji State	Von Braun Center • Huntsville, Alabama	Munroe	L 1–3	1,662	9–6–4 (6–2–1)
January 22	4:05 pm	Bemidji State	Von Braun Center • Huntsville, Alabama	Munroe	W 5–1	1,947	10–6–4 (7–2–1)
February 4	6:05 pm	at Niagara	Dwyer Arena • Lewiston, New York	Munroe	W 4–2	935	11–6–4 (8–2–1)
February 5	6:05 pm	at Niagara	Dwyer Arena • Lewiston, New York	Munroe	W 4–2	1,444	12–6–4 (9–2–1)
February 11	8:05 pm	Air Force	Von Braun Center • Huntsville, Alabama	Munroe	W 3–1	2,484	13–6–4 (10–2–1)
February 12	4:05 pm	Air Force	Von Braun Center • Huntsville, Alabama	Munroe	L 2–3	2,158	13–7–4 (10–3–1)
February 18	7:35 pm	at Bemidji State	John S. Glas Field House • Bemidji, Minnesota	Munroe	W 3–1	1,210	14–7–4 (11–3–1)
February 19	7:05 pm	at Bemidji State	John S. Glas Field House • Bemidji, Minnesota	Munroe	L 2–3	1,399	14–8–4 (11–4–1)
February 25	6:35 pm	at Robert Morris	Island Sports Center • Neville Island, Pennsylvania	Munroe	W 4–0	909	15–8–4 (12–4–1)
February 26	6:35 pm	at Robert Morris	Island Sports Center • Neville Island, Pennsylvania	Munroe	W 3–0	981	16–8–4 (13–4–1)
March 5	2:05 pm	at Wayne State	Compuware Sports Arena • Plymouth, Michigan	Munroe	L 0–4	484	16–9–4 (13–5–1)
March 6	1:05 pm	at Wayne State	Compuware Sports Arena • Plymouth, Michigan	Narduzzi	W 6–5	521	17–9–4 (14–5–1)
CHA Tournament
March 12	3:35 pm	vs. Niagara*	IRA Civic Center • Grand Rapids, Minnesota (CHA Tournament Semifinal)	Munroe	W 4–2	960	18–9–4 (14–5–1)
March 13	7:05 pm	vs. Bemidji State*	IRA Civic Center • Grand Rapids, Minnesota (CHA Tournament Final)	Munroe	L 0–3	1,300	18–10–4 (14–5–1)
*Non-conference game. All times are in Central Time.

=== Standings ===
2004–05 College Hockey America standings
	Conference							Overall					
	GP	W	L	T	PTS	GF	GA	GP	W	L	T	GF	GA
#15 Bemidji State†*	20	16	4	0	32	69	45	37	23	13	1	123	95
Alabama-Huntsville	20	14	5	1	29	71	43	32	18	10	4	106	79
Niagara	20	9	9	2	20	61	62	36	15	19	2	110	114
Wayne State	20	7	9	4	18	55	54	35	14	17	4	107	107
Air Force	20	5	14	1	11	41	64	36	14	19	3	82	107
Robert Morris	20	4	14	2	10	35	64	33	8	21	4	62	107
Championship: Bemidji State † indicates conference regular season champion * indicates conference tournament champion Final rankings: USA Today/USA Hockey Magazine Top 15 Poll

=== Statistics ===
==== Skaters ====
Player	Pos	Yr	GP	G	A	Pts	PIM	PPG	SHG	GWG
Jared Ross	C	Sr	30	22	18	40	53	10	0	4
Bruce Mulherin	C	Jr	31	24	15	39	80	11	4	3
Craig Bushey	RW	Sr	31	12	21	33	54	8	0	0
Jeremy Schreiber	D	Jr	32	2	21	23	59	2	0	0
Jeff Winchester	D	Jr	29	1	20	21	64	0	1	1
Steve Canter	RW	So	30	8	11	19	32	1	2	2
Brett McConnachie	RW	So	32	8	5	13	42	2	0	3
Grant Selinger	C	So	28	4	8	12	51	2	0	1
Keith Rowe	LW	Sr	32	3	9	12	65	1	0	1
Mike Salekin	D	Fr	31	2	8	10	58	1	0	1
Doug Watkins	D	Sr	32	1	9	10	70	0	0	0
Tyler Hilbert	LW	Fr	25	1	7	8	12	0	0	0
Todd Bentley	LW	Jr	32	1	7	8	25	0	1	0
Chris Martini	LW	Jr	27	5	2	7	24	0	0	1
Dominik Rozman	LW	So	29	4	2	6	12	0	0	0
Shaun Arvai	D	So	26	1	5	6	10	0	0	0
Ryan Brown	D	Sr	31	1	5	6	38	1	0	0
David Nimmo	C	So	23	2	3	5	12	0	0	0
Derek Conter	LW	Fr	18	4	0	4	25	1	0	1
Marc Narduzzi	G	Fr	3	0	1	1		0	0	0
Matt Montes	D	Fr	6	0	1	1	16	0	0	0
Denny Reagan	LW	Fr	8	0	1	1	6	0	0	0
A.J. Larivee	D	So	13	0	1	1	8	0	0	0
Scott Munroe	G	Jr	31	0	0	0		0	0	0
Team			32	106	180	286	816	40	8	18

==== Goalies ====
Player	Yr	GP	TOI	W	L	T	GA	GAA	SV	SV%	SO
Scott Munroe	Jr	31	1805	16	10	4	69	2.29	913	0.930	3
Marc Narduzzi	Fr	3	128	2	0	0	8	3.75	79	0.908	0
