= Lucinda Rogers =

English illustrator and artist (born 1966)

Lucinda Rogers (born 1966) is an English illustrator and artist.

== Biography ==
Rogers is widely known as an illustrator of newspaper columns, including Jonathan Meades' "A Sense of Place" in The Times, and the "Weasel" column written by Christopher Hirst, Alexander Chancellor and several others in The Independent from 1993 to 2008. Rogers also drew restaurants and chefs for a column in The Daily Telegraph by Andrew Lloyd Webber called A Matter of Taste from 1996 to 2000. From 1997 to 2001, she drew weekly for the, now defunct, broadsheet Sunday Business.

Books illustrated by Rogers include The Dictionary of Urbanism by Robert Cowan, and Spitalfields Life co-illustrated with other artists. Rogers contributed one hundred drawings to a cookbook by Rowley Leigh called No Place Like Home. Rogers also drew the cover and illustrations for a new translation of Histoires Naturelles by Jules Renard published by Alma Books in 2010 (the first edition of 1896 was illustrated by Henri de Toulouse-Lautrec). Rogers' work for The Guardian includes main features in the Review section.

Rogers is also known for her drawings of cities, particularly London and New York, and as a "reportage" artist, drawing directly from life. She was given special access to draw a group of 33 ink on paper works, and one work in colour, at the World Trade Center site during the cleanup process at Ground Zero in the winter of 2001–2.

A series of Rogers drawings made in Tottenham in 2015 entitled Employment Land Portfolio was exhibited during that year's London Festival of Architecture. On a similar theme, she drew scenes of the specialist printers Baddeley Brothers for their book.

Rogers was a judge at the University of the West of England 'Reportage Awards' In 2015, celebrating achievements in documentary drawing. During May 2016 Rogers exhibited drawings of workspaces in Tottenham and Frome at Rook Lane Chapel in Frome, Somerset. From June 7 through the summer of 2016, Rogers showed 'Restaurant Drawings Historic and Contemporary' at L'Escargot in Soho, London.

Rogers' work is represented in many public collections, including that of the Victoria & Albert Museum. Her drawings of New York and London have been exhibited at the Oxo Tower on London's South Bank.

In 2017 Rogers was commissioned by the House of Illustration, with support from Arts Council England, to document the changing landscape of London, with a focus on Ridley Road Market in Dalston, East London. The exhibition ‘Lucinda Rogers: On Gentrification — Drawings from Ridley Road Market’ ran from 28 October 2017 to 25 March 2018.

An exhibition of Rogers drawings of the Snape Maltings arts centre and surrounding area of Aldeburgh, Suffolk was shown from 8 September to 23 December 2018.

In 2019, Rogers published a curated collection of her reportage drawings of New York, spanning 30 years: 'New York: Drawings 1988-2018', with foreword by Lucy Sante.

== Bibliography ==
=== Books by Lucinda Rogers ===
- Rogers, Lucinda (Author, Artist), 'New York: Drawings 1988-2018', Lucy Sante (Preface), Olivia Ahmad (Editor), Esterson Associates (Designer), West Street Press, 2019. ISBN 191627420X, ISBN 978-1916274204

=== Books Illustrated by Lucinda Rogers ===
- Cowan, Robert, 'The Dictionary of Urbanism', Streetwise Press, 2005. ISBN 0954433009, ISBN 978-0954433000
- Gentle Author, The, 'Spitalfields life : "in the midst of life I woke to find myself living in an old house beside Brick Lane in the East End of London"', illustrations by Mark Hearld, Lucinda Rogers and Rob Ryan, Saltyard Book Co., London, 2013. ISBN 9781444703962
- Leigh, Rowley, 'No place like home', illustrations by Lucinda Rogers, London, Fourth Estate, 2000. ISBN 1857024990
- Renard, Jules, 'Histoires naturelles', translated by Richard Stokes, illustrations by Lucinda Rogers, Oneworld Classics, Richmond, 2010. ISBN 9781847491701, ISBN 1847491707
- Rogers, John, 'The Undelivered Mardle', Darton, Longman & Todd, 2013. ISBN 0232529566, ISBN 978-0232529562
- Townsend, Anne, [compiled by], 'Love and marriage', illustrated by Lucinda Rogers, Collins, London, 1989. ISBN 0002155362

=== Book Cover Illustrations by Lucinda Rogers ===
- The Unexpected Professor by John Carey
- Six novels by Angus Wilson published in paperback by Penguin Books, 1992

=== Other work ===
- December 2018 to present: Illustrations for Dream Palaces in Sight and Sound Magazine
