= Robert Cowan =

Robert Cowan may refer to:

- Robert Cowan (cricketer) (1880–1962), Australian cricketer
- Robert Cowan (governor) (died 1737), Irish MP
- Robert Cowan (ice hockey) (born 1983), Canadian ice hockey defenceman
- Robert E. Cowan (1830–1887), American lawyer and politician
- Rob Cowan (born 1948), English music broadcaster and writer
- Rob Cowan (urbanist) (born 1950), British writer, editor and cartoonist
- Bob Cowan (curler) (Robert A. Cowan) (born c. 1947), Scottish curler, journalist, curling historian, blogger.
- Rob Cowan, British music producer, Tracy-Ann Oberman's husband

== See also ==
- Robert Cowen (born 1930), United States federal judge
