= 2007 CHA men's ice hockey tournament =

2007 CHA Men's ice hockey tournament
- Dates: March 9–11, 2007
- Teams: 5
- Finals site: 95KGGO Arena; Des Moines, Iowa
- Champions: Alabama-Huntsville (1st title)
- Winning coach: Doug Ross (1st title)
- MVP: David Nimmo (Alabama-Huntsville)
- CHA Men's Ice Hockey Tournaments

The 2007 CHA Men's Ice Hockey Tournament was the 8th tournament in conference history and was played between March 9 and March 11, 2007 at the 95KGGO Arena in Des Moines, Iowa. By winning the tournament, Alabama-Huntsville received College Hockey America's automatic bid to the 2007 NCAA Men's Division I Ice Hockey Tournament.

== Format ==
The tournament featured three rounds of play. In the first round, the fourth and fifth ranked seeds, Wayne State and Alabama-Huntsville, played for entry into the semifinals, to which the top three seeds received byes. The winners of the two semifinal games then played for the championship on March 11, 2007, with the winner receiving an automatic bid to the 2007 NCAA Men's Division I Ice Hockey Tournament.

=== Conference standings ===
Note: GP = Games played; W = Wins; L = Losses; T = Ties; PTS = Points; GF = Goals For; GA = Goals Against

2006–07 College Hockey America standings
	Conference							Overall					
	GP	W	L	T	PTS	GF	GA	GP	W	L	T	GF	GA
Niagara†	20	9	5	6	24	70	62	37	18	13	6	126	128
Bemidji State	20	9	6	5	23	56	54	33	14	14	5	97	109
Robert Morris	20	9	10	1	19	67	72	35	14	19	2	110	129
Wayne State	20	8	10	2	18	64	63	35	12	21	2	97	125
Alabama–Huntsville*	20	7	11	2	16	63	69	36	13	20	3	112	137
Championship: Alabama–Huntsville † indicates conference regular season champion * indicates conference tournament champion Final rankings: USA Today/USA Hockey Magazine Top 15 Poll

== Bracket ==
Quarterfinal

March 9, 2007

Semifinals

March 10, 2007

Championship

March 11, 2007

1
Niagara
3

5
Alabama-Huntsville
5

4
Wayne State
3

5
Alabama-Huntsville
4*

3
Robert Morris
4

5
Alabama-Huntsville
5*

2
Bemidji State
5

3
Robert Morris
7

Note: * denotes overtime period(s)

== Tournament awards ==
=== All-Star team ===
- Goaltender: Blake MacNicol (Alabama-Huntsville)
- Defensemen: Rob Cowan (Robert Morris), Mike Salekin (Alabama-Huntsville)
- Forwards: Sean Berkstresser (Robert Morris), Chris Margott (Robert Morris), Kevin Morrison (Alabama-Huntsville)

=== MVP ===
- David Nimmo (Alabama-Huntsville)
