= 2006–07 Alabama–Huntsville Chargers men's ice hockey season =

American college ice hockey team season

2006–07 Alabama–Huntsville Chargers men's ice hockey

CHA tournament champions

NCAA 1st round, L to Notre Dame, 3–2 (2OT)
- Conference: College Hockey America
- Record: 13–20–3 (7–11–2 CHA)
- Head coach: Doug Ross (25th season)
- Assistant coaches: Lance West; John McCabe; Steve Briere
- Captains: Shaun Arvai; Grant Selinger
- Home stadium: Von Braun Center

The 2006–07 Alabama–Huntsville Chargers ice hockey team represented the University of Alabama in Huntsville in Huntsville, Alabama, United States. The Chargers were coached by Doug Ross who was in his twenty-fifth, and final, season as head coach. His assistant coaches were Lance West, John McCabe, and Steve Briere. The Chargers played their home games in the Von Braun Center, and were a member of College Hockey America.

After a 32-game regular season, the Chargers finished with 10 wins, 19 losses, and 3 ties. Despite finishing last in the CHA in the regular season, the team won all 3 of its games in the CHA Tournament to earn an automatic bid to the 2007 NCAA Division I men's ice hockey tournament. At the NCAA tournament, the Chargers played to double overtime with #2 overall seed Notre Dame before falling, 3–2.

== Roster ==
No.	Nat.	Player	Class	Pos	Height	Weight	DoB	Hometown	Previous team
2		Matt Montes	Junior	D	6' 1" (1.85 m)	195 lb (88 kg)	1983-07-01	Forest Park, Illinois	Springfield (NAHL)
3		Brett McConnachie	Senior	RW	5' 11" (1.8 m)	185 lb (84 kg)	1985-03-01	Ajax, Ontario	Wexford (OJHL)
4		Brandon Roshko	Freshman	D	5' 9" (1.75 m)	180 lb (82 kg)	1985-08-22	Hamilton, Ontario	Aurora (OJHL)
5		Scott Kalinchuk	Sophomore	D	6' 1" (1.85 m)	195 lb (88 kg)	1984-11-23	Sylvan Lake, Alberta	Canmore (AJHL)
6		A.J. Larivee	Senior	D	6' 1" (1.85 m)	205 lb (93 kg)	1983-12-19	Dublin, Ontario	St. Marys (WOHL)
8		Mike Salekin	Junior	D	6' 1" (1.85 m)	185 lb (84 kg)	1985-08-17	Castlegar, British Columbia	Merritt (BCHL)
9		Tyler Hilbert	Junior	LW	5' 9" (1.75 m)	185 lb (84 kg)	1984-01-12	Okotoks, Alberta	Olds (AJHL)
10		Dominik Rozman	Senior	LW	5' 11" (1.8 m)	190 lb (86 kg)	1983-03-10	Wallaceburg, Ontario	Sarnia (WOHL)
11		Brennan Barker	Freshman	D	6' 1" (1.85 m)	195 lb (88 kg)	1985-07-19	Long Sault, Ontario	Penticton (OJHL)
12		Josh Murray	Sophomore	RW	5' 11" (1.8 m)	190 lb (86 kg)	1984-11-11	Terrace, British Columbia	Williams Lake (BCHL)
14		Cale Tanaka	Freshman	LW	5' 9" (1.75 m)	180 lb (82 kg)	1986-05-31	Stouffville, Ontario	Aurora (OJHL)
15		Shaun Arvai (C)	Senior	D	5' 10" (1.78 m)	170 lb (77 kg)	1982-10-06	West Lorne, Ontario	Petrolia (WOHL)
16		Tom Train	Freshman	C	6' 1" (1.85 m)	190 lb (86 kg)	1985-02-22	Hurst, Texas	Texas (NAHL)
18		Steve Canter	Senior	RW	6' 1" (1.85 m)	190 lb (86 kg)	1983-06-29	St. Louis, Missouri	Billings (AWHL)
19		Grant Selinger (C)	Senior	C	5' 11" (1.8 m)	180 lb (82 kg)	1983-03-22	Regina, Saskatchewan	South Surrey (BCHL)
20		Joe Federoff	Sophomore	C	6' 2" (1.88 m)	205 lb (93 kg)	1984-08-05	Pittsburgh, Pennsylvania	Robert Morris (NCAA)
21		Derek Conter	Junior	LW	6' 2" (1.88 m)	205 lb (93 kg)	1983-06-10	Toronto, Ontario	Wichita Falls (AWHL)
22		David Nimmo	Senior	C	6' 2" (1.88 m)	220 lb (100 kg)	1982-07-25	St. Albert, Alberta	Melfort (SJHL)
25		Kevin Morrison	Freshman	LW	6' 1" (1.85 m)	190 lb (86 kg)	1986-04-30	Mississauga, Ontario	Milton (OJHL)
26		Kevin Galerno	Sophomore	LW	5' 7" (1.7 m)	160 lb (73 kg)	1984-01-19	Kitchener, Ontario	Kitchener (MWJHL)
27		Troy Maney	Senior	D	6' 2" (1.88 m)	200 lb (91 kg)	1982-10-04	Huntsville, Alabama	Capital Centre (NAHL)
28		Davide Nicoletti	Freshman	D	6' 3" (1.91 m)	210 lb (95 kg)	1986-03-22	Toronto, Ontario	Springfield (NAHL)
29		Blake MacNicol	Freshman	G	5' 10" (1.78 m)	175 lb (79 kg)	1986-12-31	Milan, Ohio	Bay State (EJHL)
30		Jordan Erickson	Sophomore	G	6' 1" (1.85 m)	180 lb (82 kg)	1984-04-18	Port McNeill, British Columbia	Spruce Grove (AJHL)
33		Marc Narduzzi	Junior	G	6' 2" (1.88 m)	190 lb (86 kg)	1982-05-25	Vancouver, British Columbia	South Surrey (BCHL)
55		Matt Sweazey	Sophomore	C	6' 1" (1.85 m)	195 lb (88 kg)	1984-04-11	Toronto, Ontario	Georgetown (OJHL)

== Season ==
=== Schedule ===
Green background indicates win (2 points).
Red background indicates loss (0 points).
Yellow background indicates tie (1 point).

Date	Time	Opponent	Site	Decision	Result	Attendance	Record
Regular season
October 7	8:05 pm	at Colorado College*	Colorado Springs World Arena • Colorado Springs, Colorado	Narduzzi	L 1–8	6,525	0–1–0
October 8	6:05 pm	at Air Force*	Cadet Ice Arena • Colorado Springs, Colorado	Narduzzi	L 3–4	863	0–2–0
October 13	6:35 pm	at #5 Michigan*	Yost Ice Arena • Ann Arbor, Michigan	Narduzzi	L 1–8	5,847	0–3–0
October 15	1:05 pm	at Bowling Green*	BGSU Ice Arena • Bowling Green, Ohio	Erickson	T 5–5 ^{OT}	1,414	0–3–1
October 20	7:05 pm	Wayne State	Von Braun Center • Huntsville, Alabama	Erickson	W 4–2	1,918	1–3–1 (1–0–0)
October 21	7:05 pm	Wayne State	Von Braun Center • Huntsville, Alabama	Narduzzi	L 6–8	1,746	1–4–1 (1–1–0)
October 27	4:05 pm	vs. Air Force*	Tampa Bay Times Forum • Tampa, Florida (Lightning College Hockey Classic Semifinal)	Erickson	L 5–7	6,772	1–5–1 (1–1–0)
October 28	4:05 pm	vs. Army*	Tampa Bay Times Forum • Tampa, Florida (Lightning College Hockey Classic Consolation)	Narduzzi	W 2–1	7,043	2–5–1 (1–1–0)
November 10	6:00 pm	at Niagara	Dwyer Arena • Lewiston, New York	Narduzzi	L 3–7	1,193	2–6–1 (1–2–0)
November 11	6:00 pm	at Niagara	Dwyer Arena • Lewiston, New York	Erickson	L 1–4	1,073	2–7–1 (1–3–0)
November 17	6:35 pm	at Robert Morris	84 Lumber Arena • Neville Island, Pennsylvania	Erickson	L 3–4	657	2–8–1 (1–4–0)
November 18	6:35 pm	at Robert Morris	84 Lumber Arena • Neville Island, Pennsylvania	Narduzzi	W 7–2	498	3–8–1 (2–4–0)
December 1	7:05 pm	Princeton*	Von Braun Center • Huntsville, Alabama	Narduzzi	L 2–4	1,853	3–9–1 (2–4–0)
December 2	7:05 pm	Princeton*	Von Braun Center • Huntsville, Alabama	Narduzzi	W 3–2	1,796	4–9–1 (2–4–0)
December 9	4:05 pm	Robert Morris	Von Braun Center • Huntsville, Alabama	Narduzzi	L 4–5	1,977	4–10–1 (2–5–0)
December 10	2:05 pm	Robert Morris	Von Braun Center • Huntsville, Alabama	Narduzzi	W 4–3	1,104	5–10–1 (3–5–0)
December 15	7:35 pm	at Bemidji State	John S. Glas Field House • Bemidji, Minnesota	Narduzzi	L 2–3	1,546	5–11–1 (3–6–0)
December 16	7:05 pm	at Bemidji State	John S. Glas Field House • Bemidji, Minnesota	Narduzzi	L 2–4	1,532	5–12–1 (3–7–0)
December 29	7:05 pm	at Minnesota*	Mariucci Arena • Minneapolis, Minnesota (Dodge Holiday Classic Semifinal)	Narduzzi	L 1–3	10,015	5–13–1 (3–7–0)
December 30	4:05 pm	vs. UMass*	Mariucci Arena • Minneapolis, Minnesota (Dodge Holiday Classic Consolation)	Narduzzi	W 5–2	10,076	6–13–1 (3–7–0)
January 12	7:05 pm	Robert Morris	Von Braun Center • Huntsville, Alabama	Narduzzi	L 2–3	1,569	6–14–1 (3–8–0)
January 13	4:05 pm	Robert Morris	Von Braun Center • Huntsville, Alabama	Narduzzi	W 3–1	1,469	7–14–1 (4–8–0)
January 26	6:35 pm	at Western Michigan*	Lawson Ice Arena • Kalamazoo, Michigan	Narduzzi	L 0–5	2,144	7–15–1 (4–8–0)
January 27	6:35 pm	at Western Michigan*	Lawson Ice Arena • Kalamazoo, Michigan	Narduzzi	L 5–6 ^{OT}	2,625	7–16–1 (4–8–0)
February 2	7:05 pm	Bemidji State	Von Braun Center • Huntsville, Alabama	Narduzzi	T 5–5 ^{OT}	2,956	7–16–2 (4–8–1)
February 3	7:05 pm	Bemidji State	Von Braun Center • Huntsville, Alabama	Narduzzi	L 1–3	2,212	7–17–2 (4–9–1)
February 9	6:05 pm	at Wayne State	Michigan State Fairgrounds Coliseum • Detroit, Michigan	MacNicol	W 3–1	320	8–17–2 (5–9–1)
February 10	6:05 pm	at Wayne State	Michigan State Fairgrounds Coliseum • Detroit, Michigan	MacNicol	L 1–4	310	8–18–2 (5–10–1)
February 16	7:35 pm	at Bemidji State	John S. Glas Field House • Bemidji, Minnesota	Narduzzi	L 3–4	1,397	8–19–2 (5–11–1)
February 17	7:05 pm	at Bemidji State	John S. Glas Field House • Bemidji, Minnesota	MacNicol	W 4–3	2,263	9–19–2 (6–11–1)
March 2	7:05 pm	Niagara	Von Braun Center • Huntsville, Alabama	MacNicol	W 3–1	1,723	10–19–2 (7–11–1)
March 3	7:35 pm	Niagara	Von Braun Center • Huntsville, Alabama	Narduzzi	T 2–2 ^{OT}	2,144	10–19–3 (7–11–2)
CHA Tournament
March 9	7:00 pm	vs. Wayne State*	95KGGO Arena • Des Moines, Iowa (CHA Tournament Quarterfinal)	Narduzzi	W 4–3 ^{OT}	255	11–19–3 (7–11–2)
March 10	2:00 pm	vs. Niagara*	95KGGO Arena • Des Moines, Iowa (CHA Tournament Semifinal)	Narduzzi	W 5–3	296	12–19–3 (7–11–2)
March 11	2:00 pm	vs. Robert Morris*	95KGGO Arena • Des Moines, Iowa (CHA Tournament Final)	MacNicol	W 5–4 ^{OT}	252	13–19–3 (7–11–2)
NCAA Tournament
March 23	4:00 pm	vs. Notre Dame*	Van Andel Arena • Grand Rapids, Michigan (NCAA Tournament Regional semifinal)	Narduzzi	L 2–3 ^{OT}	5,201	13–20–3 (7–11–2)
*Non-conference game. All times are in Central Time.

=== Standings ===
2006–07 College Hockey America standings
	Conference							Overall					
	GP	W	L	T	PTS	GF	GA	GP	W	L	T	GF	GA
Niagara†	20	9	5	6	24	70	62	37	18	13	6	126	128
Bemidji State	20	9	6	5	23	56	54	33	14	14	5	97	109
Robert Morris	20	9	10	1	19	67	72	35	14	19	2	110	129
Wayne State	20	8	10	2	18	64	63	35	12	21	2	97	125
Alabama–Huntsville*	20	7	11	2	16	63	69	36	13	20	3	112	137
Championship: Alabama–Huntsville † indicates conference regular season champion * indicates conference tournament champion Final rankings: USA Today/USA Hockey Magazine Top 15 Poll

=== Statistics ===
==== Skaters ====
Player	Pos	Yr	GP	G	A	Pts	PIM	PPG	SHG	GWG
David Nimmo	C	Sr	36	14	22	36	56	8	2	2
Grant Selinger	C	Sr	36	17	16	33	63	9	1	3
Brett McConnachie	RW	Sr	35	12	16	28	40	3	1	2
Mike Salekin	D	Jr	34	7	16	23	67	2	0	3
Shaun Arvai	D	Sr	35	2	20	22	43	1	0	0
Steve Canter	RW	Sr	35	12	9	21	38	5	0	0
Scott Kalinchuk	D	So	35	6	10	16	44	5	0	1
Josh Murray	RW	So	35	6	10	16	47	1	0	0
Tyler Hilbert	LW	Jr	33	5	9	14	46	0	2	1
Kevin Morrison	LW	Fr	36	9	4	13	26	2	1	1
Dominik Rozman	LW	Sr	36	6	7	13	22	1	0	0
Brandon Roshko	D	Fr	36	3	8	11	6	1	0	0
Joe Federoff	C	So	20	3	7	10	26	0	0	0
Matt Sweazey	C	So	34	2	8	10	48	2	0	0
Tom Train	C	Fr	30	3	4	7	22	0	0	0
Cale Tanaka	LW	Fr	27	2	3	5	30	0	0	0
Kevin Galerno	LW	So	28	2	2	4	8	0	0	0
Brennan Barker	D	Fr	20	1	2	3	31	0	0	0
Davide Nicoletti	D	Fr	24	0	3	3	24	0	0	0
A.J. Larivee	D	Sr	28	0	2	2	18	0	0	0
Troy Maney	D	Sr	5	0	0	0	17	0	0	0
Blake MacNicol	G	Fr	8	0	0	0	0	0	0	0
Jordan Erickson	G	So	9	0	0	0	2	0	0	0
Matt Montes	D	Jr	10	0	0	0	18	0	0	0
Marc Narduzzi	G	Jr	27	0	0	0	2	0	0	0
Team			36	112	178	290	754	40	7	13

==== Goaltenders ====
Player	Yr	GP	TOI	W	L	T	GA	GAA	SV	SV%	SO
Marc Narduzzi	Jr	27	1480:07	8	16	2	86	3.49	729	0.894	0
Blake MacNicol	Fr	8	351:43	4	1	0	16	2.73	154	0.906	0
Jordan Erickson	So	9	393:30	1	3	1	31	4.73	171	0.847	0
