= 1995–96 Alabama–Huntsville Chargers men's ice hockey season =

American college ice hockey team season

1995–96 Alabama–Huntsville Chargers men's ice hockey

NCAA Division II National Champions

NCAA Championship Series, W 7–1, 3–0 vs. Bemidji State
- Conference: Independent
- Record: 24–0–3
- Head coach: Doug Ross (14th season)
- Home stadium: Von Braun Civic Center

The 1995–96 Alabama–Huntsville Chargers ice hockey team represented the University of Alabama in Huntsville in the 1995–96 NCAA Division II men's hockey season, winning the national championship. It was the school's first NCAA national championship, following club national championships in 1981–82, 1982–83, and 1983–84. The team was coached by Doug Ross, who was in his 14th season as head coach, and played their home games at the Von Braun Civic Center.

The Chargers completed the regular season with 22 wins, zero losses, and 3 ties. They were then invited to play the Bemidji State Beavers in a two-game series to determine the Division II National Championship at Huntsville's Von Braun Civic Center. The Chargers would dominate in both a 7–1 victory on March 8, followed by 3–0 shutout to clinch the championship the following day.

In the weeks following the championship, speculation on plans for a new 4,000-seat arena near the Benton H. Wilcoxon Municipal Iceplex for the Chargers were later abandoned. Additionally, whether or not to move back to Division I became an issue, but UAH would refrain from the jump until 1998.

== Roster ==
No.	Nat.	Player	Class	Pos	Height	Weight	DoB	Hometown	Previous team
1		Cédrick Billequey	Freshman	G	6' 0" (1.83 m)	160 lb (73 kg)	1975-03-10	Montreal, Quebec
3		Scott Usmail	Junior	D	5' 11" (1.8 m)	195 lb (88 kg)	1973-11-08	New Hartford, New York
4		Steve Borko	Senior	D	6' 5" (1.96 m)	200 lb (91 kg)	1971-01-11	Schaumburg, Illinois	Des Moines (USHL)
5		Taso Sofikitis	Senior	D	5' 10" (1.78 m)	195 lb (88 kg)	1971-03-01	Vancouver, British Columbia	Bellingham (BCJHL)
6		Marc Macera	Senior	D	5' 11" (1.8 m)	185 lb (84 kg)	1971-12-20	London, Ontario
7		Brad Dame	Senior	D	6' 0" (1.83 m)	190 lb (86 kg)	1972-01-31	Windsor, Ontario	Windsor (WOHL)
8		Sheldon Wolitski	Senior	D	5' 11" (1.8 m)	188 lb (85 kg)	1972-07-12	St. Albert, Alberta
9		Joe Provenzano	Freshman	D	6' 1" (1.85 m)	195 lb (88 kg)	1975-03-29	Grosse Pointe, Michigan	Des Moines (USHL)
10		Darren Awender	Sophomore	C	5' 8" (1.73 m)	170 lb (77 kg)		St. Clair Beach, Ontario	Leamington (WOHL)
11		John Barrett	Freshman	F				London, Ontario
12		Ryan Wood	Senior	RW	5' 11" (1.8 m)	197 lb (89 kg)	1971-09-28	Morden, Manitoba	Winkler (MJHL)
13		Levi Hall	Freshman	D	6' 3" (1.91 m)	200 lb (91 kg)	1975-06-04	Kenai, Alaska	Wisconsin (USHL)
14		Matt Parker	Sophomore	LW	5' 10" (1.78 m)	170 lb (77 kg)	1975-07-28	Huntsville, Alabama
15		Paul Schloss	Freshman	LW	5' 10" (1.78 m)	180 lb (82 kg)		Livonia, Michigan
16		Tony Guzzo	Junior	C	5' 10" (1.78 m)	175 lb (79 kg)		Canton, Michigan
17		Wade Tulk	Senior	C	5' 10" (1.78 m)	180 lb (82 kg)	1971-09-23	St. Catharines, Ontario	Massena (CJHL)
18		Mario Mazzuca	Senior	LW	6' 0" (1.83 m)	210 lb (95 kg)	1971-11-13	Dearborn, Michigan
19		Mike Hamlin	Freshman	RW	6' 0" (1.83 m)	180 lb (82 kg)		Flint, Michigan
20		Eric Bilyeu	Junior	LW	5' 9" (1.75 m)	170 lb (77 kg)	1973-03-22	St. Joseph, Michigan
21		K. C. Schneider	Junior	RW	5' 11" (1.8 m)	180 lb (82 kg)		Indianapolis, Indiana
22		Jamie Baby	Freshman	C	6' 1" (1.85 m)	180 lb (82 kg)		Parry Sound, Ontario	Muskoka (MetJHL)
24		Chris Price	Freshman	LW	6' 2" (1.88 m)	195 lb (88 kg)		Naperville, Illinois	Springfield (NAHL)
25		John McCabe	Sophomore	LW	6' 4" (1.93 m)	205 lb (93 kg)	1974-05-30	Espanola, Ontario
27		Ryan Stewart	Sophomore	RW	5' 10" (1.78 m)	170 lb (77 kg)		Bowmanville, Ontario	Danville (NAHL)
29		Ryan Gillespie	Freshman	F				Franklin, Tennessee
30		Derek Puppa	Senior	G	5' 9" (1.75 m)	170 lb (77 kg)	1972-02-18	Kirkland Lake, Ontario
35		Mike Zeller	Sophomore	G	6' 0" (1.83 m)	175 lb (79 kg)		Goodrich, Michigan

== Regular season ==
=== Schedule ===
- Green background indicates win.
- Red background indicates loss.
- Yellow background indicates tie.

Date	Opponent	Site	Decision	Result	Attendance	Record
Regular Season
October 27	St. Norbert*	Von Braun Civic Center • Huntsville, Alabama		W 5–4	1,908	1–0–0
October 28	St. Norbert*	Von Braun Civic Center • Huntsville, Alabama		W 4–2	811	2–0–0
November 3	Windsor*	Von Braun Civic Center • Huntsville, Alabama (Exhibition)	Puppa	W 7–1	n/a	2–0–0
November 4	Windsor*	Von Braun Civic Center • Huntsville, Alabama (Exhibition)	Puppa	W 6–5 ^{OT}	n/a	2–0–0
November 17	New Hampshire College*	Von Braun Civic Center • Huntsville, Alabama		W 13–2	3,259	3–0–0
November 18	New Hampshire College*	Von Braun Civic Center • Huntsville, Alabama		W 7–0	923	4–0–0
November 25	RIT*	Von Braun Civic Center • Huntsville, Alabama		W 7–3	1,138	5–0–0
November 26	RIT*	Von Braun Civic Center • Huntsville, Alabama	Puppa	W 3–0	753	6–0–0
December 1	Augsburg*	Von Braun Civic Center • Huntsville, Alabama		W 12–1	2,113	7–0–0
December 2	Augsburg*	Von Braun Civic Center • Huntsville, Alabama		W 13–2	1,001	8–0–0
December 15	St. Scholastica*	Von Braun Civic Center • Huntsville, Alabama	Puppa	W 6–0	1,427	9–0–0
December 16	St. Scholastica*	Von Braun Civic Center • Huntsville, Alabama		W 10–0	916	10–0–0
December 29	St. John's (MN)*	Von Braun Civic Center • Huntsville, Alabama		W 6–3	1,698	11–0–0
December 30	St. John's (MN)*	Von Braun Civic Center • Huntsville, Alabama		W 5–3	1,332	12–0–0
January 5	Salem State*	Von Braun Civic Center • Huntsville, Alabama		W 3–2	2,331	13–0–0
January 6	Salem State*	Von Braun Civic Center • Huntsville, Alabama	Puppa	T 3–3 ^{OT}	1,307	13–0–1
January 12	Curry*	Von Braun Civic Center • Huntsville, Alabama		W 16–0	3,595	14–0–1
January 13	Curry*	Von Braun Civic Center • Huntsville, Alabama		W 20–1	850	15–0–1
January 26	at Mercyhurst*	Mercyhurst Ice Center • Erie, Pennsylvania	Puppa	T 2–2 ^{OT}	950	15–0–2
January 27	at Mercyhurst*	Mercyhurst Ice Center • Erie, Pennsylvania		W 3–2	1,200	16–0–2
January 28	at Elmira*	Murray Athletic Center • Elmira, New York		W 4–2	347	17–0–2
February 10	Minnesota–Crookston*	Von Braun Civic Center • Huntsville, Alabama		W 4–2	1,500	18–0–2
February 11	Minnesota–Crookston*	Von Braun Civic Center • Huntsville, Alabama		W 2–1	1,403	19–0–2
February 16	Mankato State*	Von Braun Civic Center • Huntsville, Alabama		W 4–2	3,756	20–0–2
February 17	Mankato State*	Von Braun Civic Center • Huntsville, Alabama		W 3–1	2,196	21–0–2
March 1	at Mankato State*	Mankato Civic Center • Mankato, Minnesota	Puppa	T 3–3 ^{OT}	2,310	21–0–3
March 2	at Mankato State*	Mankato Civic Center • Mankato, Minnesota		W 4–3	2,674	22–0–3
NCAA Division II Championship Series
March 8	Bemidji State*	Von Braun Civic Center • Huntsville, Alabama	Puppa	W 7–1	6,126	23–0–3
March 9	Bemidji State*	Von Braun Civic Center • Huntsville, Alabama	Puppa	W 3–0	6,291	24–0–3
*Non-conference game. Sources:

== Player stats ==
=== Skaters ===
Player	Pos	Yr	GP	G	A	Pts	PIM	PPG	SHG	GWG
Mario Mazzuca	LW	Sr	27	30	22	52	60	12	2	3
Tony Guzzo	C	Jr	27	13	34	47	8	3	0	6
Ryan Wood	RW	Sr	26	20	25	45	62	9	2	1
Shledon Wolitski	D	Sr	27	11	27	38	42	4	0	1
Taso Sofikitis	D	Sr	27	10	26	36	20	6	0	0
Wade Tulk	C	Sr	26	12	13	25	46	3	0	2
K. C. Schneider	RW	Jr	27	16	7	23	6	1	2	2
Jamie Baby	C	Fr	27	8	14	22	18	0	0	0
Eric Bilyeu	LW	Jr	27	10	10	20	33	0	1	1
Matt Parker	LW	So	26	7	12	19	20	0	0	0
Mike Hamlin	RW	Fr	27	7	10	17	26	2	1	2
John McCabe	LW	So	23	8	6	14	20	2	0	1
Darren Awender	C	So	25	3	11	14	8	0	0	1
Brad Dame	D	Sr	27	2	12	14	24	2	0	0
Mark Macera	D	Sr	26	3	8	11	65	2	0	0
Scott Usmail	D	Sr	26	4	5	9	38	0	0	0
Paul Schloss	LW	Fr	24	5	3	8	10	0	0	1
Chris Price	LW	Fr	2	1	3	4	2	0	0	0
Ryan Stewart	RW	So	7	1	3	4	2	0	0	0
Joe Provenzano	D	Fr	18	0	2	2	8	0	0	0
Team			27	172	261	433	548	46	8	24

=== Goaltenders ===
Player	Yr	GP	TOI	W	L	T	GA	GAA	SV%	SO
Derek Puppa	Sr	25	1316:10	21	0	3	37	1.69	.936	3
Mike Zeller	So	6	229:44	3	0	0	7	1.83	.929	0
Cédrick Billequey	Fr	4	89:06	0	0	0	1	0.67	.964	0
