= 2007–08 NCAA Division I men's ice hockey rankings =

- NCAA tournament: 2008
- NCAA champion: Boston College
- Preseason No. 1 (USA Today): North Dakota
- Preseason No. 1 (USCHO): North Dakota
- NCAA Division I men's ice hockey rankings

Two human polls made up the 2007–08 NCAA Division I men's ice hockey rankings, the USCHO.com/CSTV Division I Men's Poll and the USA TODAY/USA Hockey Magazine Poll. As the 2007–08 season progressed, rankings were updated weekly. There were a total of 34 voters in the USA Today poll and 50 voters in the USCHO.com poll. Each first place vote in the USA Today poll is worth 15 points in the rankings while a first place vote in the USCHO.com poll is worth 20 points with every subsequent vote worth 1 fewer point in either poll.

== Legend ==
	Increase in ranking
	Decrease in ranking
	Not ranked previous week
(Italics)	Number of first place votes
#–#–#	Win–loss–tie record
т	Tied with team above or below also with this symbol

== USA Today/USA Hockey Magazine ==
	Preseason Oct 1	Week 1 Oct 8	Week 2 Oct 15	Week 3 Oct 22	Week 4 Oct 29	Week 5 Nov 5	Week 6 Nov 12	Week 7 Nov 19	Week 8 Nov 26	Week 9 Dec 3	Week 10 Dec 10	Week 11 Dec 17	Week 13 Jan 7	Week 14 Jan 14	Week 15 Jan 21	Week 16 Jan 28	Week 17 Feb 4	Week 18 Feb 11	Week 19 Feb 18	Week 20 Feb 25	Week 21 Mar 3	Week 22 Mar 10	Week 23 Mar 17	Week 24 Mar 24	Week 25 Mar 31	Final Apr 14	
1.	North Dakota (14)	North Dakota (0–0–0) (34)	North Dakota (1–0–0) (46)	North Dakota (2–0–1) (24)	Miami (6–0–0) (30)	Miami (8–0–0) (34)	Michigan (9–1–0) (21)	Miami (11–1–0) (26)	Miami (13–1–0) (24)	Miami (13–1–0) (33)	Michigan (16–2–0) (21)	Michigan (16–2–0) (22)	Michigan (18–2–0) (30)	Michigan (20–2–0) (34)	Michigan (22–2–0) (34)	Miami (25–3–0) (34)	Miami (25–3–0) (34)	Michigan (23–3–4) (33)	Michigan (25–3–4) (34)	Michigan (26–4–4) (28)	North Dakota (23–8–2) (24)	Michigan (27–5–4) (15)	Michigan (29–5–4) (28)	Michigan (31–5–4) (34)	Michigan (33–5–4) (34)	Boston College (25–11–8) (34)	1.
2.	Michigan State (14)	Boston College (0–0–0)	Miami (2–0–0) (3)	Miami (4–0–0) (9)	Michigan (5–1–0)	Michigan (7–1–0)	Miami (9–1–0) (12)	Michigan (11–1–0) (8)	Michigan (13–1–0) (10)	Michigan (14–2–0) (1)	Miami (14–2–0) (10)	Miami (16–2–0) (10)	Denver (16–4–0) (5)	Miami (21–3–0)	Miami (23–3–0) (1)	Michigan (22–3–1)	Michigan (22–3–3)	Miami (25–4–1)	North Dakota (19–8–2)	New Hampshire (21–7–2) (3)	Michigan (27–5–4) (8)	North Dakota (23–8–4) (9)	Colorado College (28–9–1) (4)	Miami (32–7–1)	North Dakota (28–10–4)	Michigan (33–6–4)	2.
3.	Boston College	Michigan State (0–1–0)	Minnesota (2–0–0)	Michigan (3–1–0)	North Dakota (3–1–1) (2)	Michigan State (6–1–0)	Michigan State (8–1–0) (1)	Denver (8–2–0)	Denver (9–3–0)	Colorado College (10–4–0)	Colorado College (10–4–0) (3)	Denver (14–4–0) (2)	Miami (19–3–0) (6)	Colorado College (16–6–0)	Colorado College (18–6–0)	North Dakota (16–8–1)	North Dakota (17–8–2)	North Dakota (17–8–2)	New Hampshire (19–7–2)	North Dakota (21–8–2) (3)	New Hampshire (22–7–3) (2)	Colorado College (26–9–1) (9)	Miami (31–6–1) (2)	North Dakota (26–10–4)	Boston College (23–11–8)	Notre Dame (27–16–4)	3.
4.	Minnesota (3)	Miami (2–0–0)	Boston College (1–1–0)	Colorado College (2–0–0)	New Hampshire (3–0–0) (2)	North Dakota (4–2–1)	Denver (6–2–0)	Colorado College (7–3–0)	Colorado College (8–4–0)	Michigan State (10–3–2)	Denver (12–4–0)	Colorado College (11–5–0)	Colorado College (14–6–0) (1)	Denver (17–5–0)	North Dakota (14–8–1)	Michigan State (17–5–5)	Colorado College (20–7–1)	New Hampshire (18–7–1) (1)	Colorado College (21–8–1)	Colorado College (23–8–1)	Miami (29–6–1)	New Hampshire (23–8–3)	New Hampshire (25–8–3)	New Hampshire (25–9–3)	Miami (33–8–1)	North Dakota (28–11–4)	4.
5.	Miami (2)	New Hampshire (0–0–0)	Denver (2–0–0)	Boston College (1–1–2)	Boston College (3–1–2)	Denver (6–2–0)	North Dakota (5–3–1)	North Dakota (5–3–1)	Michigan State (8–3–2)	Denver (10–4–0)	Michigan State (12–3–2)	Michigan State (12–3–2)	Massachusetts (9–3–5)	New Hampshire (13–6–1)	Michigan State (16–5–4)	Denver (18–6–0)	New Hampshire (16–7–1)	Colorado College (21–8–1)	Miami (25–6–1)	Miami (27–6–1)	Colorado College (24–9–1)	Miami (29–6–1) (1)	North Dakota (25–9–4)	Denver (26–13–1)	Notre Dame (26–15–4)	Miami (33–8–1)	5.
6.	New Hampshire (1)	Minnesota (2–0–0)	Michigan (1–1–0)	New Hampshire (1–0–0) (1)	Michigan State (4–1–0)	Boston College (3–1–3)	New Hampshire (5–1–1)	Michigan State (8–3–0)	New Hampshire (7–2–1)	Notre Dame (14–4–0)	Notre Dame (16–4–0)	Notre Dame (16–4–0)	Notre Dame (18–6–0)	Michigan State (14–5–4)	Denver (18–6–0)	Colorado College (18–7–1)	Michigan State (18–6–5)	Denver (19–8–1)	Michigan State (20–8–5)	Michigan State (21–9–5)	Michigan State (23–9–5)	Michigan State (23–9–5)	Denver (24–13–1)	Colorado College (28–11–1)	New Hampshire (25–10–3)	New Hampshire (25–10–3)	6.
7.	Clarkson	Notre Dame (1–1–0)	Clarkson (2–1–0)	Denver (3–1–0)	Denver (4–2–0)	New Hampshire (4–1–0)	Colorado College (5–3–0)	Clarkson (9–3–0)	Notre Dame (12–4–0)	New Hampshire (8–3–1)	North Dakota (8–6–1)	North Dakota (8–6–1)	Northeastern (10–4–2)	North Dakota (12–8–1)	New Hampshire (13–7–1)	New Hampshire (15–7–1)	Denver (18–8–0)	Boston College (14–6–7)	Boston College (16–6–7)	Denver (21–10–1)	Denver (22–11–1)	Clarkson (20–10–4)	Boston College (19–11–8)	Boston College (21–11–8)	Colorado College (28–12–1)	Michigan State (25–12–5)	7.
8.	Notre Dame	Boston University (0–0–0)	New Hampshire (0–0–0)	Clarkson (3–1–0)	Minnesota (4–2–0)	Clarkson (6–2–0)	Clarkson (7–3–0)	New Hampshire (6–2–1)	North Dakota (6–4–1)	North Dakota (7–5–1)	Clarkson (10–5–0)	Clarkson (10–5–0)	New Hampshire (11–6–1)	Notre Dame (18–7–1)	Boston College (11–5–6)	Notre Dame (20–9–1)	Notre Dame (20–9–1)	Michigan State (18–8–5)	Denver (19–10–1)	Boston College (16–9–7)	Clarkson (20–10–4)	Denver (22–13–1)	St. Cloud State (19–14–5)	St. Cloud State (19–15–5)	Michigan State (25–12–5)	Colorado College (28–12–1)	8.
9.	Boston University	Michigan (0–0–0)	Michigan State (0–1–0)	Michigan State (2–1–0)	Wisconsin (3–1–0)	Colorado College (3–3–0)	Boston College (3–2–4)	Notre Dame (9–4–0)	Clarkson (10–4–0)	Clarkson (10–5–0)	Massachusetts (7–3–5)	Massachusetts (7–3–5) т	Michigan State (13–5–3)	Massachusetts (9–5–5)	Notre Dame (18–9–1)	Boston College (12–5–7)	Boston College (12–6–7)	Notre Dame (20–10–2)	Notre Dame (21–10–3)	Clarkson (18–10–4)	Boston College (16–10–8)	Boston College (17–11–8)	Michigan State (24–11–5)	Michigan State (24–11–5)	Clarkson (22–13–4)	Denver (26–14–1)	9.
10.	Michigan	Denver (0–0–0)	Colorado College (0–0–0)	Minnesota (2–2–0)	Colorado College (2–2–0)	Wisconsin (4–4–0)	Wisconsin (5–3–0)	Massachusetts (5–2–4)	St. Cloud State (7–3–2)	Massachusetts (6–3–5)	New Hampshire (8–4–1)	New Hampshire (9–4–1) т	North Dakota (10–8–1)	Northeastern (11–5–2)	Clarkson (13–7–2)	Clarkson (15–7–2)	Minnesota–Duluth (11–9–6)	Minnesota–Duluth (11–9–6)	Minnesota State (16–11–4)	Minnesota State (16–11–4)	Minnesota State (17–13–4)	St. Cloud State (17–14–5)	Clarkson (21–12–4)	Clarkson (21–12–4)	Denver (26–14–1)	Clarkson (22–13–4)	10.
11.	Colorado College	Colorado College (0–0–0)	Notre Dame (1–1–0)	Wisconsin (3–1–0)	Clarkson (4–2–0)	Maine (4–2–1)	Notre Dame (7–4–0)	St. Cloud State (6–2–2)	Massachusetts (6–3–4)	Wisconsin (7–6–1)	Northeastern (7–4–2)	Northeastern (7–4–2)	Clarkson (11–6–1)	Boston College (10–5–5)	Northeastern (11–6–3)	Wisconsin (11–10–5)	Providence (12–9–3)	Clarkson (16–9–3)	Clarkson (17–10–3)	Notre Dame (21–11–4)	St. Cloud State (17–14–3)	Minnesota State (18–14–4)	Notre Dame (24–13–4)	Minnesota (19–16–9)	St. Cloud State (19–16–5)	Princeton (21–14–0)	11.
12.	Denver	St. Lawrence (1–0–0)	Ohio State (2–0–0)	Notre Dame (2–2–0)	Maine (4–2–0)	Notre Dame (6–3–0)	Minnesota (6–4–0)	Minnesota–Duluth (5–3–2)	Northeastern (6–2–2)	Harvard (6–2–1)	Harvard (6–3–2)	Minnesota (9–8–1)	Boston College (8–5–5)	Clarkson (12–7–1)	Quinnipiac (14–5–3)	Minnesota–Duluth (10–8–6)	Wisconsin (12–11–5)	Wisconsin (13–11–6)	Wisconsin (14–12–6)	Princeton (17–10–0)	Notre Dame (22–12–4)	Notre Dame (22–12–4)	Minnesota (17–15–9)	Notre Dame (24–15–4)	Princeton (21–14–0)	Minnesota (19–17–9)	12.
13.	Maine	Clarkson (0–1–0)	St. Lawrence (2–1–0) т	Maine (2–2–0)	Notre Dame (4–3–0)	Michigan Tech (5–3–0)	St. Cloud State (6–2–2)	Boston College (3–3–5)	Minnesota–Duluth (5–3–2)	Northeastern (7–4–1)	Minnesota (9–8–1)	Wisconsin (7–7–2)	Massachusetts–Lowell (9–4–4)	St. Cloud State (11–10–3)	St. Cloud State (11–10–3)	Providence (11–9–2)	Clarkson (15–9–2)	Minnesota State (15–10–4)	Minnesota–Duluth (12–10–6)	St. Cloud State (16–13–3)	Wisconsin (15–14–7)	Boston University (17–15–4)	Boston University (19–16–4)	Princeton (21–13–0)	Minnesota (19–17–9)	Wisconsin (16–17–7)	13.
14.	Wisconsin	Wisconsin (0–0–0)	Wisconsin (1–1–0) т	Ohio State (2–2–0)	Michigan Tech (4–2–0)	Minnesota (4–4–0)	Massachusetts (4–2–3)	Wisconsin (5–5–0)	Wisconsin (5–6–1)	St. Cloud State (7–5–2)	Wisconsin (7–7–2)	Boston College (6–4–5)	Minnesota (11–9–2)	Quinnipiac (13–5–3)	Massachusetts (9–7–5)	Northeastern (11–8–3)	Northeastern (12–8–3)	Providence (13–10–3)	Providence (13–11–4)	Wisconsin (14–13–7)	Minnesota (14–13–9)	Wisconsin (15–14–7)	Minnesota State (19–16–4)	Minnesota State (19–16–4)	Wisconsin (16–17–7)	St. Cloud State (19–16–5)	14.
15.	Quinnipiac	Maine (0–0–0)	Massachusetts (1–1–0) т Quinnipiac (0–0–0) т	Michigan Tech (3–1–0)	Minnesota–Duluth (4–1–1)	Minnesota–Duluth (4–1–1)	Minnesota–Duluth (4–3–1)	Minnesota (7–5–0)	Harvard (5–2–0)	Minnesota–Duluth (6–5–2)	Boston College (5–4–5)	Harvard (6–4–2)	St. Cloud State (10–10–2)	Massachusetts–Lowell (10–5–4)	Massachusetts–Lowell (11–6–4)	Minnesota (12–11–5)	Minnesota State (13–10–4)	Northeastern (13–9–3)	Princeton (15–10–0)	Minnesota–Duluth (12–12–6)	Providence (14–13–5)	Minnesota (15–14–9)	Princeton (19–13–0)	Boston University (19–17–4)	Minnesota State (19–16–4)	Minnesota State (19–16–4)	15.
	Preseason Oct 1	Week 1 Oct 8	Week 2 Oct 15	Week 3 Oct 22	Week 4 Oct 29	Week 5 Nov 5	Week 6 Nov 12	Week 7 Nov 19	Week 8 Nov 26	Week 9 Dec 3	Week 10 Dec 10	Week 11 Dec 17	Week 13 Jan 7	Week 14 Jan 14	Week 15 Jan 21	Week 16 Jan 28	Week 17 Feb 4	Week 18 Feb 11	Week 19 Feb 18	Week 20 Feb 25	Week 21 Mar 3	Week 22 Mar 10	Week 23 Mar 17	Week 24 Mar 24	Week 25 Mar 31	Final Apr 14	
		Dropped: Quinnipiac	Dropped: Maine	Dropped: Massachusetts; Quinnipiac; St. Lawrence	Dropped: Ohio State	None	Dropped: Maine; Michigan Tech	None	Dropped: Boston College; Minnesota	None	Dropped: Minnesota–Duluth; St. Cloud State	None	Dropped: Harvard; Wisconsin	Dropped: Minnesota	None	Dropped: Massachusetts; Massachusetts–Lowell; Quinnipiac; St. Cloud State	Dropped: Minnesota	None	Dropped: Northeastern	Dropped: Providence	Dropped: Minnesota–Duluth; Princeton	Dropped: Providence	Dropped: Wisconsin	None	Dropped: Boston University	None	

== USCHO.com ==
	Preseason Oct 1	Week 2 Oct 15	Week 3 Oct 22	Week 4 Oct 29	Week 5 Nov 5	Week 6 Nov 12	Week 7 Nov 19	Week 8 Nov 26	Week 10 Dec 10	Week 11 Dec 17	Week 12 Dec 31	Week 13 Jan 7	Week 14 Jan 14	Week 15 Jan 21	Week 16 Jan 28	Week 17 Feb 4	Week 18 Feb 11	Week 19 Feb 18	Week 20 Feb 25	Week 21 Mar 3	Week 22 Mar 10	Week 23 Mar 17	Final Mar 24	
1.	North Dakota (13)	North Dakota (1–0–0) (46)	North Dakota (2–0–1) (42)	Miami (6–0–0) (39)	Miami (8–0–0) (49)	Miami (9–1–0) (26)	Miami (11–1–0) (48)	Miami (13–1–0) (44)	Michigan (16–2–0) (27)	Miami (16–2–0) (23)	Miami (18–2–0) (24)	Michigan (18–2–0) (38)	Michigan (20–2–0) (45)	Michigan (22–2–0) (49)	Miami (25–3–0) (49)	Miami (25–3–0) (50)	Michigan (23–3–4) (48)	Michigan (25–3–4) (48)	Michigan (26–4–4) (35)	North Dakota (23–8–2) (37)	Michigan (27–5–4) (19)	Michigan (29–5–4) (41)	Michigan (31–5–4) (50)	1.
2.	Boston College (3)	Miami (2–0–0) (3)	Miami (4–0–0) (7)	North Dakota (3–1–1) (4)	Michigan (7–1–0)	Michigan (9–1–0) (22)	Michigan (11–1–0) (2)	Michigan (13–1–0) (6)	Miami (14–2–0) (15)	Michigan (16–2–0) (24)	Michigan (18–2–0) (12)	Miami (19–3–0) (6)	Miami (21–3–0) (5)	Miami (23–3–0) (1)	Michigan (22–3–1) (1)	Michigan (22–3–3)	Miami (25–4–1)	North Dakota (19–8–2) (2)	North Dakota (21–8–2) (10)	Michigan (27–5–4) (12)	North Dakota (23–8–4) (20)	Colorado College (28–9–1) (5)	Miami (32–7–1)	2.
3.	Michigan State (11)	Minnesota (2–0–0)	Michigan (3–1–0)	Michigan (5–1–0)	North Dakota (4–2–1)	Michigan State (8–1–0) (2)	Denver (8–2–0)	Denver (9–3–0)	Colorado College (10–4–0) (6)	Denver (14–4–0) (3)	Denver (16–4–0) (2)	Denver (16–4–0) (5)	Colorado College (16–6–0)	Colorado College (18–6–0)	North Dakota (16–8–1)	North Dakota (17–8–2)	North Dakota (17–8–2)	New Hampshire (19–7–2)	New Hampshire (21–7–2) (5)	New Hampshire (22–7–3) (1)	Colorado College (26–9–1) (9)	Miami (31–6–1) (1)	North Dakota (26–10–4)	3.
4.	Miami (1)	Boston College (1–1–0)	Colorado College (2–0–0)	New Hampshire (3–0–0) (3)	Michigan State (6–1–0) (1)	Denver (6–2–0)	Colorado College (7–3–0)	Colorado College (8–4–0)	Denver (12–4–0) (2)	Colorado College (11–5–0)	Colorado College (12–6–0)	Colorado College (14–6–0) (1)	Denver (17–5–0)	North Dakota (14–8–1)	Denver (18–6–0)	Colorado College (20–7–1)	New Hampshire (18–7–1) (2)	Colorado College (21–8–1)	Colorado College (23–8–1)	Miami (29–6–1)	Miami (29–6–1) (2)	North Dakota (25–9–4) (3)	Denver (26–13–1)	4.
5.	Minnesota (1)	Denver (2–0–0)	Boston College (1–1–2)	Boston College (3–1–2)	Denver (6–2–0)	North Dakota (5–3–1)	Michigan State (8–3–0)	Michigan State (8–3–2)	Michigan State (12–3–2)	Michigan State (12–3–2)	Massachusetts (9–3–5)	Massachusetts (9–3–5)	New Hampshire (13–6–1)	Denver (18–6–0)	Michigan State (17–5–5)	New Hampshire (16–7–1)	Colorado College (21–8–1)	Miami (25–6–1)	Miami (27–6–1)	Colorado College (24–9–1)	New Hampshire (23–8–3)	New Hampshire (25–8–3)	New Hampshire (25–9–3)	5.
6.	New Hampshire	Michigan (1–1–0)	Denver (3–1–0)	Michigan State (4–1–0)	New Hampshire (4–1–0)	New Hampshire (5–1–1)	North Dakota (5–3–1)	New Hampshire (7–2–1)	Notre Dame (16–4–0)	Notre Dame (16–4–0)	Notre Dame (17–5–0)	Notre Dame (18–6–0)	North Dakota (12–8–1)	Michigan State (16–5–4)	Colorado College (18–7–1)	Michigan State (18–6–5)	Denver (19–8–1)	Michigan State (20–8–5)	Michigan State (21–9–5)	Michigan State (23–9–5)	Michigan State (23–9–5)	Denver (24–13–1)	Colorado College (28–11–1)	6.
7.	Clarkson	Clarkson (2–1–0)	New Hampshire (1–0–0) (1)	Denver (4–2–0)	Boston College (3–1–3)	Colorado College (5–3–0)	Clarkson (9–3–0)	Notre Dame (12–4–0)	North Dakota (8–6–1)	North Dakota (8–6–1)	New Hampshire (10–5–1)	Northeastern (10–4–2)	Michigan State (14–5–4)	New Hampshire (13–7–1)	New Hampshire (15–7–1)	Denver (18–8–0)	Boston College (14–6–7)	Boston College (16–6–7)	Denver (21–10–1)	Denver (22–11–1)	Clarkson (20–10–4)	St. Cloud State (19–14–5)	Boston College (21–11–8)	7.
8.	Notre Dame	New Hampshire (0–0–0)	Michigan State (2–1–0)	Minnesota (4–2–0)	Clarkson (6–2–0)	Clarkson (7–3–0)	New Hampshire (6–2–1)	North Dakota (6–4–1)	Clarkson (10–5–0)	Clarkson (10–5–0)	North Dakota (9–7–1)	New Hampshire (11–6–1) т	Notre Dame (18–7–1)	Boston College (11–5–6)	Notre Dame (20–9–1)	Notre Dame (20–9–1)	Michigan State (18–8–5)	Denver (19–10–1)	Boston College (16–9–7)	Clarkson (20–10–4)	Denver (22–13–1)	Boston College (19–11–8)	St. Cloud State (19–15–5)	8.
9.	Boston University	Michigan State (0–1–0)	Clarkson (3–1–0)	Colorado College (2–2–0)	Colorado College (3–3–0)	Wisconsin (5–3–0)	Notre Dame (9–4–0)	Clarkson (10–4–0)	Massachusetts (7–3–5)	Massachusetts (7–3–5)	Northeastern (9–4–2)	North Dakota (10–8–1) т	Northeastern (11–5–2)	Notre Dame (18–9–1)	Boston College (12–5–7)	Boston College (12–6–7)	Notre Dame (20–10–2)	Notre Dame (21–10–3)	Minnesota State (16–11–4)	Minnesota State (17–13–4)	St. Cloud State (17–14–5)	Michigan State (24–11–5)	Michigan State (24–11–5)	9.
10.	Michigan	Colorado College (0–0–0)	Minnesota (2–2–0)	Wisconsin (3–1–0)	Wisconsin (4–4–0)	Notre Dame (7–4–0)	Massachusetts (5–2–4) т	St. Cloud State (7–3–2)	New Hampshire (8–4–1)	New Hampshire (9–4–1)	Michigan State (12–5–2)	Michigan State (13–5–3)	Massachusetts (9–5–5)	Clarkson (13–7–2)	Clarkson (15–7–2)	Minnesota–Duluth (11–9–6)	Wisconsin (13–11–6)	Wisconsin (14–12–6)	Clarkson (18–10–4)	Boston College (16–10–8)	Boston College (17–11–8) т	Clarkson (21–12–4)	Minnesota (19–16–9)	10.
11.	Colorado College	Notre Dame (1–1–0)	Wisconsin (3–1–0)	Clarkson (4–2–0)	Maine (4–2–1)	Boston College (3–2–4)	St. Cloud State (6–2–2) т	Massachusetts (6–3–4)	Northeastern (7–4–2)	Northeastern (7–4–2)	Boston College (8–4–5)	Clarkson (11–6–1)	Boston College (10–5–5)	Northeastern (11–6–3)	Wisconsin (11–10–5)	Wisconsin (12–11–5)	Clarkson (16–9–3)	Minnesota State (16–11–4)	Notre Dame (21–11–4)	St. Cloud State (17–14–3)	Minnesota State (18–14–4) т	Notre Dame (24–13–4)	Clarkson (21–12–4)	11.
12.	Maine	Ohio State (2–0–0)	Notre Dame (2–2–0)	Maine (4–2–0)	Notre Dame (6–3–0)	Minnesota (6–4–0)	Wisconsin (5–5–0)	Minnesota–Duluth (5–3–2)	Minnesota (9–8–1)	Minnesota (9–8–1)	Clarkson (10–6–1)	Boston College (8–5–5)	Clarkson (12–7–1)	Quinnipiac (14–5–3)	Minnesota–Duluth (10–8–6)	Providence (12–9–3)	Minnesota–Duluth (11–9–6)	Clarkson (17–10–3)	St. Cloud State (16–13–3)	Notre Dame (22–12–4)	Notre Dame (22–12–4)	Minnesota (17–15–9)	Notre Dame (24–15–4)	12.
13.	Denver	Wisconsin (1–1–0)	Maine (2–2–0)	Michigan Tech (4–2–0)	Michigan Tech (5–3–0)	St. Cloud State (6–2–2)	Minnesota (7–5–0)	Wisconsin (5–6–1)	Wisconsin (7–7–2)	Wisconsin (7–7–2)	Wisconsin (8–7–3)	Massachusetts–Lowell (9–4–4)	St. Cloud State (11–10–3)	St. Cloud State (11–10–3)	Northeastern (11–8–3)	Clarkson (15–9–2)	Minnesota State (15–10–4)	Minnesota–Duluth (12–10–6)	Wisconsin (14–13–7)	Wisconsin (15–14–7)	Wisconsin (15–14–7)	Boston University (19–16–4)	Princeton (21–13–0)	13.
14.	Quinnipiac	Quinnipiac (0–0–0)	Michigan Tech (3–1–0)	Notre Dame (4–3–0)	Minnesota (4–4–0)	Massachusetts (4–2–3)	Boston College (3–3–5)	Minnesota (7–6–1)	Harvard (6–3–2)	Boston College (6–4–5)	Massachusetts–Lowell (9–4–4)	St. Cloud State (10–10–2)	Quinnipiac (13–5–3)	Massachusetts (9–7–5)	Providence (11–9–2)	Northeastern (12–8–3)	Providence (13–10–3)	Northeastern (14–11–3) т	Princeton (17–10–0)	Minnesota (14–13–9)	Boston University (17–15–4)	Minnesota State (19–16–4)	Minnesota State (19–16–4)	14.
15.	Wisconsin	St. Lawrence (2–1–0)	St. Lawrence (2–2–0)	Minnesota–Duluth (4–1–1)	Minnesota–Duluth (4–1–1)	Rensselaer (6–3–2)	Minnesota–Duluth (5–3–2)	Harvard (5–2–0)	Boston College (5–4–5)	Harvard (6–4–2)	St. Cloud State (9–9–2)	Minnesota (11–9–2)	Massachusetts–Lowell (10–5–4)	Massachusetts–Lowell (11–6–4)	Massachusetts (9–8–6)	Minnesota State (13–10–4)	Northeastern (13–9–3)	Providence (13–11–4) т	Minnesota–Duluth (12–12–6)	Princeton (17–12–0)	Minnesota (15–14–9)	Princeton (19–13–0)	Boston University (19–17–4)	15.
16.	St. Lawrence	St. Cloud State (1–0–1)	Massachusetts (2–1–1)	St. Lawrence (3–3–0)	Rensselaer (5–2–2)	Maine (4–4–1)	Rensselaer (6–3–2)	Northeastern (6–4–1)	Rensselaer (8–5–3)	St. Cloud State (8–8–2)	Minnesota (9–9–2) т	Quinnipiac (11–5–3)	Minnesota–Duluth (8–7–5)	Wisconsin (10–10–4)	Massachusetts–Lowell (11–8–4) т	Quinnipiac (15–7–4)	Quinnipiac (17–7–4)	St. Cloud State (14–13–3)	Boston University (14–14–4)	Boston University (15–15–4)	Princeton (17–12–0)	Harvard (16–12–4)	Harvard (17–13–4)	16.
17.	St. Cloud State	Maine (0–2–0)	Minnesota–Duluth (1–1–0)	Rensselaer (5–2–0)	St. Cloud State (4–2–2)	Minnesota–Duluth (4–3–1)	Niagara (8–3–0)	Niagara (8–3–0)	St. Cloud State (7–7–2)	Rensselaer (8–7–3)	Minnesota–Duluth (6–6–4) т	Wisconsin (8–9–3)	Wisconsin (9–10–3)	Minnesota (12–10–4)	Quinnipiac (14–7–3) т	Massachusetts–Lowell (12–9–4)	Princeton (14–9–0)	Princeton (15–10–0)	Minnesota (13–13–8)	Providence (14–13–5)	Harvard (14–11–4)	Wisconsin (15–16–7)	Wisconsin (15–16–7)	17.
18.	Cornell	Boston University (0–1–1)	Cornell (0–0–0)	Niagara (4–1–0)	Princeton (3–0–0)	Michigan Tech (5–5–0)	Harvard (4–2–0)	Rensselaer (6–4–3)	Minnesota–Duluth (6–6–4)	Minnesota–Duluth (6–6–4)	Quinnipiac (10–5–2)	Michigan Tech (9–9–2)	Minnesota (11–10–3)	Princeton (10–8–0)	Minnesota (12–11–5)	Massachusetts (10–9–6)	Massachusetts–Lowell (12–10–4)	Massachusetts–Lowell (13–11–4)	Northeastern (14–13–3)	Minnesota–Duluth (12–14–6)	Minnesota–Duluth (13–15–6)	Vermont (16–14–7)	Vermont (17–15–7)	18.
19.	Ohio State	Cornell (0–0–0)	Ohio State (2–2–0)	St. Cloud State (3–2–1)	Niagara (5–2–0)	Harvard (3–1–0)	Michigan Tech (5–6–1)	Boston College (3–4–5)	Bowling Green (8–6–0)	Bowling Green (8–6–0)	Minnesota State (9–7–3)	Minnesota–Duluth (7–7–4)	Princeton (10–8–0)	Minnesota–Duluth (8–8–6)	Princeton (10–8–0)	Princeton (12–9–0)	St. Cloud State (12–13–3)	Quinnipiac (17–9–4)	Providence (13–13–4)	Harvard (14–11–4)	Vermont (14–13–7)	Niagara (22–10–4)	Niagara (22–10–4)	19.
20.	Vermont	Massachusetts (1–1–0)	Alaska–Anchorage (1–1–0)	Massachusetts (2–2–2)	Massachusetts (3–2–2)	Niagara (6–3–0)	Northeastern (5–4–1)	Michigan Tech (5–6–1)	Massachusetts–Lowell (7–4–4)	Massachusetts–Lowell (7–4–4)	Michigan Tech (7–9–2)	Minnesota State (9–7–3)	Minnesota State (9–8–4)	Air Force (12–8–4)	St. Cloud State (11–12–3)	Minnesota (12–12–6)	Niagara (16–8–3)	Niagara (16–8–4)	Harvard (13–11–3)	Niagara (19–9–4)	Providence (14–15–5)	Cornell (18–13–3)	Air Force (21–11–6)	20.
	Preseason Oct 1	Week 2 Oct 15	Week 3 Oct 22	Week 4 Oct 29	Week 5 Nov 5	Week 6 Nov 12	Week 7 Nov 19	Week 8 Nov 26	Week 10 Dec 10	Week 11 Dec 17	Week 12 Dec 31	Week 13 Jan 7	Week 14 Jan 14	Week 15 Jan 21	Week 16 Jan 28	Week 17 Feb 4	Week 18 Feb 11	Week 19 Feb 18	Week 20 Feb 25	Week 21 Mar 3	Week 22 Mar 10	Week 23 Mar 17	Final Mar 24	
		Dropped: Vermont	Dropped: Boston University; Quinnipiac; St. Cloud State	Dropped: Alaska–Anchorage; Cornell; Ohio State	Dropped: St. Lawrence	Dropped: Princeton	Dropped: Maine	None	Dropped: Michigan Tech; Niagara	None	Dropped: Bowling Green; Harvard; Rensselaer	None	Dropped: Michigan Tech	Dropped: Minnesota State	Dropped: Air Force	Dropped: St. Cloud State	Dropped: Massachusetts; Minnesota	None	Dropped: Massachusetts–Lowell; Niagara; Quinnipiac	Dropped: Northeastern	Dropped: Niagara	Dropped: Minnesota–Duluth; Providence	Dropped: Cornell	
