= Doug Ross (ice hockey) =

American ice hockey player (1951–2022)

Biographical details
- Born: October 9, 1951; Dearborn, Michigan, U.S.
- Died: August 16, 2022 (aged 70); Huntsville, Alabama, U.S.

Playing career
- 1973–1975: Bowling Green
- Position: Right wing

Coaching career (HC unless noted)
- 1976–1977: Ohio
- 1977–1979: Kalamazoo Central High School
- 1979–1981: Kent State
- 1982–2007: Alabama–Huntsville

Head coaching record
- Overall: 506–318–47 (all-time); 394–273–42 (varsity/NCAA)

Accomplishments and honors

Championships
- National Club Championship: 1983, 1984; NCAA Division II: 1996, 1998

Douglas George Ross (October 9, 1951 – August 16, 2022) was an American college ice hockey player, 1976 USA Olympic hockey player and college ice hockey head coach. Ross is most noted as head coach of the University of Alabama in Huntsville ice hockey team from 1982–2007 where he won two national club championships and two NCAA Division II championships. Ross also coached the club hockey program at Ohio University and oversaw the transition of Kent State University hockey from club status to varsity status in 1980.

== Coaching career ==
Ross began his college coaching career at Ohio University where he guided the club team for one season. He spent the next two seasons as head coach at Kalamazoo Central High School in Kalamazoo, Michigan. Ross was then hired at Kent State University on July 1, 1979. At Kent, he guided the Golden Flashes from club status to NCAA Division I independent status with a schedule of independent, Division II, Division III, and NAIA varsity teams, as well as select club programs. Unexpectedly, Ross was fired on April 14, 1981. He was quickly hired on as head coach of Alabama-Huntsville's club ice hockey team on June 8, 1981 where he would coach for the next 26 years. Ross' tenure saw UAH make three straight appearances in the club hockey national Championship final between 1982 and 1985, winning two (1982–83, 1983–84). The club's sustained success saw them make the jump from club to NAIA for the '85-'86 season, NCAA Division II in '86-'87, then finally moving to Division I as an independent university for the first time before the '87-'88 season. The Chargers would compete in Division I until the end of the '91-'92 season after which they would drop down to Division II due to a .446 win/loss ratio over 5 years. UAH would spend the next six seasons in Division II and rediscovered their form; earning a .722 win percentage over a period of six seasons and claiming the Division II National Championship twice and appearing in the finals two other times. The '98-'99 season saw UAH return to Division I as independents but starting the '99-2000 season UAH joined the CHA Conference, winning the Conference Tournament in 06-07 despite finishing the season with a CHA worst 13 wins, 20 losses, and 3 OTL. Doug Ross retired from coaching college hockey the following summer and was succeeded by Danton Cole.

== Awards and honors ==
=== Player ===
Award	Year	
MJCHA Tournament Most Valuable Player	1973	Oakland Community College
All-CCHA All-Conference Honorable Mention	1973–74	
All-CCHA First Team	1974–75	

=== Coach ===
- 1998 State of Alabama Collegiate Coach of the Year (Sington Award).
- 2002–03 College Hockey America Coach of the Year.
- 2007 USA Hockey Distinguished Service Award.

== Head coaching record ==
Season	Head coach	Conference	Level	GP	Overall record (W-L-T)	Conference record (W-L-T, finish)	Postseason results
1976–77	Ohio	—	Club	21	13–8–0	—	—
1979–80	Kent State	—	Club	36	25–9–2	—	—
1980–81	Kent State	Independent	NCAA I	35	17–18–0	—	—
1982–83^{†}	Alabama—Huntsville	Central States Collegiate Hockey League	Club	35	26–7–2	13–0–0 (1st)	Lost in CSCHL Tournament final National Club Champions
1983–84^{†}	Alabama—Huntsville	Central States Collegiate Hockey League	Club	31	27–4–0	18–0–0 (1st)	National Club Champions
1984–85	Alabama—Huntsville	Central States Collegiate Hockey League	Club	29	21–7–1	8–2–0 (1st)	Lost in CSCHL Tournament semifinals Lost in National Club Championship final
1985–86	Alabama—Huntsville	Independent	NAIA	28	14–13–1	—	—
1986–87	Alabama—Huntsville	Independent	NCAA II	30	20–10–0	—	—
1987–88	Alabama—Huntsville	Independent	NCAA I	30	11–18–1	—	—
1988–89	Alabama—Huntsville	Independent	NCAA I	26	15–10–1	—	—
1989–90	Alabama—Huntsville	Independent	NCAA I	35	10–22–3	—	—
1990–91	Alabama—Huntsville	Independent	NCAA I	32	9–21–2	—	—
1991–92	Alabama—Huntsville	Independent	NCAA I	27	16–10–1	—	—
1992–93	Alabama—Huntsville	Independent	NCAA II	28	15–12–1	—	—
1993–94	Alabama—Huntsville	Independent	NCAA II	26	20–5–1	—	Lost in NCAA championship finals
1994–95	Alabama—Huntsville	Independent	NCAA II	27	20–5–2	—	—
1995–96^{†}	Alabama—Huntsville	Independent	NCAA II	29	26–0–3	—	NCAA Division II National Champions
1996–97	Alabama—Huntsville	Independent	NCAA II	28	20–8–0	—	Lost in NCAA championship finals
1997–98^{†}	Alabama—Huntsville	Independent	NCAA II	30	24–3–3	—	NCAA Division II National Champions
1998–99	Alabama—Huntsville	Independent	NCAA II	27	21–5–1	—	—
1999–00	Alabama—Huntsville	College Hockey America	NCAA I	31	17–10–4	12–5–1 (2nd)	Lost in CHA championship
2000–01	Alabama—Huntsville	College Hockey America	NCAA I	34	21–12–1	15–4–1 (1st)	Lost in CHA championship
2001–02	Alabama—Huntsville	College Hockey America	NCAA I	37	18–18–1	10–9–1 (3rd)	Lost in CHA championship
2002–03	Alabama—Huntsville	College Hockey America	NCAA I	35	18–14–3	13–5–2 (1st)	Lost in CHA semifinals
2003–04	Alabama—Huntsville	College Hockey America	NCAA I	31	11–16–4	10–9–1 (3rd)	Lost in CHA quarterfinals
2004–05	Alabama—Huntsville	College Hockey America	NCAA I	32	18–10–4	14–5–1 (2nd)	Lost in CHA championship
2005–06	Alabama—Huntsville	College Hockey America	NCAA I	34	19–13–2	12–7–1 (T-2nd)	Lost in CHA semifinals
2006–07*^	Alabama—Huntsville	College Hockey America	NCAA I	36	13–20–3	7–11–2 (5th)	CHA Tournament Champions; Lost in NCAA Midwest Regional semifinals
All-time record			28 seasons	870	505–318–47		
Varsity/NCAA record			23 seasons	708	393–273–42		

== Personal life and death ==
Ross was the father of former NHL forward Jared Ross. Doug Ross died on August 16, 2022, at the age of 70.

== See also ==
- List of college men's ice hockey coaches with 400 wins

Awards and achievements
Preceded by Bill Wilkinson	CHA Coach of the Year; 2002–03	Succeeded by Tom Serratore
