= Centre for Environmental Studies =

UK think tank

The Centre for Environmental Studies (CES) was an environmental think-tank in the United Kingdom. It was established in 1967 by the second Wilson government as an independent charitable trust for the purpose of advancing education and research in the planning and design of the physical environment. It began with $750,000 funding from the Ford Foundation and grants from the British government.

The first director was A. H. Chilver, Professor of Civil Engineering in the University of London. The centre began to assess the needs for research in planning the environment for human living, and to consider how and where this research could most effectively be undertaken. In 1969 David Donnison took over as Director and remained until 1976. During that time he oversaw the establishment of the Planning Exchange.

Funding for the centre was withdrawn by the Thatcher government in 1979. The centre continued for some years as an independent body, closing in the 1980s.
