= Rob Cowan (urbanist) =

Rob Cowan (born 20 November 1950) is a British urbanist, writer, editor, speaker, consultant, cartoonist, illustrator and lexicographer.

== Career ==
After working in housing research at the Planning Exchange in Glasgow and planning aid at the Town and Country Planning Association in London, Rob Cowan turned to journalism as editor of the TCPA's journal Town and Country Planning in 1982, editor of Roof (the magazine of the housing charity Shelter) from 1983 and at the Architects' Journal in various roles, including as acting editor in 1990.

From 2000 to 2007 Cowan was the first director of the Urban Design Group and since 2007 he has been a director of the consultancy UDS Planning (formerly Urban Design Skills). He was the joint author of the government’s first urban design guidance, By Design: urban design in the planning system (2000). He has originated three influential urban design methods: the Placecheck method of urban design audit (now a web app that he runs with the architect and software developer Chris Sharpe); the skills appraisal method Capacitycheck (which now provides the criteria for the Urban Design Group's recognised practitioner membership category); and the design appraisal method Qualityreviewer.

He has been a senior research fellow in the Department of Architecture, De Montfort University (1995–2003); an external examiner in town planning at the Bartlett School, UCL (2001–03); an external examiner in town planning at the University of Manchester (2002–05); and a teaching fellow (urban design) at the Bartlett School, UCL (2004–06). He was a corporate member of the Royal Town Planning Institute from 1999 to 2023.

Cowan began working on urban lexicography in 2000. The first edition of his acclaimed The Dictionary of Urbanism was published in 2005, and he has been updating and expanding it ever since. The second edition will be illustrated and have more than 12,000 entries.

== Activities ==
In 1973 Cowan founded the Wyndham Lewis Society, devoted to the modernist writer and painter. The society publishes the Journal of Wyndham Lewis Studies and the Lewisletter. Cowan was chairman (1990–92) and a trustee (1992–99) of Vision for London. He has been editor of Context, the journal of the Institute of Historic Building Conservation, since 2000. He was an assessor for the Scottish student urban design awards (2002–05) and a special advisor to the House of Commons ODPM Committee (2004). He was a board member of the Nordic Urban Design Association from 2006 to 2014, and he chaired its first four annual conferences in Norway. Since 2006 Cowan has been a trustee (and secretary from 2006 to 2025) of the Lady Margaret Paterson Osborn Trust (set up by the family of the town planning pioneer Sir Frederic Osborn). He gave the Royal Town Planning Institute's masterclasses on urban design for many years. He was The Planner's cartoonist for 20 years, and his cartoons have been published in Context and the Architects' Journal. He presents the Plandemonium series of online cartoon videos. He has been a member of the judging panel for the Civic Voice Design Awards since 2015.

== Publications ==
- Cowan, R. and Delaney, A. (1993) London After Dark, Phaidon Press, London.
- Cowan, R. (1995) Planning Aid in Practice, Royal Town Planning Institute.
- Cowan, R. (1995) The Cities Design Forgot, Urban Initiatives, London.
- Cowan, R., Henderson, G., and Strelitz, Z. (1996) Making Cities Better: visions and implementation, Vision for Cities, London.
- Cowan, R. (1996) A Matter of Life and Death: mixed-use development, Birmingham City Council, Birmingham.
- Cowan, R. (1997) The Connected City, Urban Initiatives, London, 1997.
- Cowan, R. (1999) The Role of Planning in Local Government, Royal Town Planning Institute, London.
- Cowan, R. (2000, and second edition 2001) Placechecks: a users’ guide, Urban Design Alliance, London.
- Campbell, K. and Cowan, R. (2000) By Design: urban design in the planning system, Thomas Telford for CABE and the Department of Transport, Planning and the Regions, London.
- Cowan, R. (2001) Designing Places (Policy Statement), Scottish Government, Edinburgh.
- Campbell, K. and Cowan, R. (2002) Re:urbanism, Urban Exchange, London.
- Cowan, R. (2002) Urban Design Guidance: urban design frameworks, development briefs and master plans, Thomas Telford, London.
- Cowan, R. (2003) Housing Quality (Planning Advice Note 67), Scottish Government, Edinburgh.
- Cowan, R. with Urban Initiatives (2004) A Councillor’s Guide to Urban Design, CABE, London.
- Cowan, R. (2005) The Dictionary of Urbanism, Streetwise Press, Tisbury.
- Cowan, R. (2008) Capacitycheck, Urban Design Alliance, London.
- Cowan, R. (2008) Masterplanning (Planning Advice Note 93), Scottish Government, Edinburgh.
- Cowan, R. (2008) Design and Access Statements Explained, Thomas Telford, London.
- Cowan, R. (2010) Plandemonium: the best of Cowan’s cartoons on planning and urban design, Streetwise Press, Tilbury.
- Cowan, R., Chapman, D. and Adams, S. (2010) Qualityreviewer, Thomas Telford Publications, London.
- Campbell, K. and Cowan, R. (editor) (2016) The Radical Incrementalist, Massive Small, London.
- Cowan, R. (editor) (2017) The Design Companion for Planning and Placemaking, Urban Design London with RIBA Publishing, London.
- Cowan, R. (2021) Essential Urban Design, RIBA Publishing, London.
