= Alabama–Huntsville Chargers men's ice hockey =

- University: University of Alabama in Huntsville
- First season: 1985–86
- Arena: Von Braun Center; Huntsville, Alabama
- Colors: Blue and white

NCAA tournament champions
- DII: 1996, 1998

NCAA tournament appearances
- DI: 2007, 2010; DII: 1994, 1996, 1997, 1998

National Club champions
- 1982, 1983, 1984

Conference tournament champions
- CHA: 2007, 2010

Conference regular season champions
- CHA: 2001, 2003

The Alabama–Huntsville Chargers ice hockey (commonly referred to as the UAH Chargers) were an NCAA Division I college ice hockey program that represented the University of Alabama in Huntsville. The program was discontinued in 2021 due to funding issues and lack of conference membership.

The Chargers played their home games at Propst Arena at the Von Braun Center. In 1987, Alabama governor George Wallace declared Huntsville to be the "Hockey Capital of the South".

== History ==
=== Founding and club championships ===
Despite being a Southern city that might be considered unfamiliar with a winter sport such as hockey, Huntsville was, beginning in the 1950s, and still is to date, home to a large number of Northern-born (and possibly some Canadian) civilian professionals working in the aerospace and defense industries, and officers and enlisted people in the U.S. Army, who desired a taste of home in their sports allegiances. Even though a similar demographic in the Atlanta market failed to make an NHL team (the Flames) profitable in the 1970s (leading to its 1980 move to Calgary, Alberta), Huntsville proved to be a different case entirely in this regard. UAH, with which a fair number of the transplants had an institutional affiliation, was a convenient forum for their enthusiasm.

The UAH ice hockey program began as a club team in the late 1970s. Joe Ritch organized the inaugural Charger team in 1979, and served as head coach. UAH defeated Emory University 11–4 in its first game on October 26, 1979. UAH dominated opposition in its first three seasons, winning three Southern Collegiate Hockey Association championships. The Chargers won the first of their three National Club Hockey Championships in 1982, defeating Southern Methodist 14–2 in the title game.

For the 1982–83 season, Doug Ross became head coach as the Chargers moved to the Central States Collegiate Hockey League. UAH lost the conference championship game in overtime to Marquette, but the Chargers hosted the U.S. National Collegiate Club Hockey Championships, where they defeated Auburn (16–2), Arizona (7–4), and Penn State (5–4) en route to their second consecutive national championship.

UAH hosted the club national championship tournament again in 1984, and the Chargers claimed a third straight title with wins over Miami University (3–1), Indiana (13–4), and Ohio (12–1). UAH hosted the tournament a third time in 1985, but its bid for a fourth straight championship fell short with a 6–2 loss to North Dakota State.

=== Varsity and Division II championships ===
UAH elevated the hockey program to varsity status for the 1985–86 season as a member of the NAIA. The school became a full NCAA Division II member in 1986. With no NCAA sponsorship of hockey at the Division II level, UAH moved its program to Division I as an independent beginning with the 1987–88 season. The Chargers went 63-81-8 in their five seasons in Division I. UAH finished with a winning season twice in that span: 1988-89 (15–10–1) and the last season, 1991-92 (18–10–1).

UAH returned to Division II hockey in 1992 with the NCAA resuming sponsorship of a national championship. In 1994, the Chargers hosted its first Division II national championship series, but lost to Bemidji State in overtime of a mini-game tiebreaker. After narrowly missing a chance at the title in 1995, the 1995-96 UAH team went undefeated (26–0–3) in the 1995–96 season and beat Bemidji State 7-1 and 3–0 at the Von Braun Center to claim its first NCAA championship in any sport. The Chargers traveled to Bemidji State for the 1997 finals, losing 4-2 and 3–2. The 1997-98 UAH team claimed its second Division II championship in 1998, beating Bemidji again 6-2 and 5–2 in Huntsville to finish 24–3–3.

=== Return to Division I and CHA era ===
UAH moved ice hockey back to Division I for the 1998–99 season as an independent, and the team became a charter member of College Hockey America starting with the 1999–2000 season. The Chargers won CHA regular season championships in 2001 and 2003.

The 2006-07 UAH team earned the school's first CHA tournament title and NCAA Division I tournament bid. The Chargers spotted Robert Morris a 4-0 first-period lead, but rallied to beat the Colonials 5–4 in overtime. At the Midwest Regional in Grand Rapids, Mich., UAH took No. 1 seed Notre Dame to double overtime before losing 3–2 in Doug Ross's final game as head coach before retiring.

Danton Cole became UAH's third head coach in 2007.

In 2009, with the CHA's demise imminent following the announced departures of Niagara, Robert Morris, and Bemidji State, UAH applied for membership to the Central Collegiate Hockey Association. The CCHA denied UAH's application on August 11.

UAH won the final CHA tournament in 2010, beating Niagara 3–2 in overtime for its second berth in the Division I tournament. The Chargers lost to top-ranked Miami 2–1 at the Midwest Regional in Fort Wayne, Ind.

=== Independence and survival ===
Cole left UAH in 2010 to become the head coach of the U.S. National Development Team. Assistant Chris Luongo was promoted to head coach as the Chargers became the lone independent program in Division I. The program struggled as an independent as scheduling and recruiting hurt without a championship to play for. UAH was a combined 6-54-3 in its first two independent seasons from 2010 to 2012.

Early into the 2011–12 season, interim UAH President Malcolm Portera announced that the 2011–12 season would be the school's final season competing at the NCAA Division I level, citing financial reasons. The program would be "realigned" as a club team, and the coaches' jobs would be eliminated. New UAH president Dr. Robert Altenkirch reversed the decision after he and school administrators met with local supporters on December 6, 2011. The school set up a campaign to raise funds for the program and have it join a conference.

Despite the questions about its hockey future, UAH was the host institution for the 2012 Frozen Four in Tampa, Florida.

A week before the start of the 2012–13 season, UAH replaced Luongo and hired Kurt Kleinendorst to become the program's fifth head coach.

On January 17, 2013, after months of discussions with conference officials and league member representatives, UAH formally applied to and was accepted to join the Western Collegiate Hockey Association. The Chargers began conference play in the 2013–14 season.

Kleinendorst resigned on May 29, 2013. UAH named Mike Corbett as its sixth head hockey coach on July 8, 2013.

=== Discontinuation ===
In response to the financial difficulties faced by the university as a result of COVID-19, UAH president Darren Dawson discontinued the men's hockey program, as well as the men's and women's tennis programs.

On May 25, 2020, the university announced the program would be reinstated if the community could raise $750,000 by Friday, May 29. Pledges from alumni reduced the amount needed from the general public to $500,000. On May 29, fundraising efforts surpassed $500,000, and shortly afterwards the university confirmed the program would be restored for the 2020–2021 season.

The program was once again indefinitely discontinued in May 2021 due to the team's lack of conference membership, which was a condition of a significant portion of the funds pledged the previous summer. The university stated it intends to reinstate the program once conference membership is secured.

== All-time coaching records ==
=== NAIA/NCAA ===
As of the completion of the 2020–21 season.

Tenure	Coach	Years	Record	Pct.
1985–2007	Doug Ross	22	376–255–42	.590
2007–2010	Danton Cole	3	23–59–12	.309
2010–2012	Chris Luongo	2	6–54–3	.119
2012–2013	Kurt Kleinendorst	1	3–21–1	.140
2013–2020	Mike Corbett	7	48–181–24	.237
2020–2021	Lance West	1	3–18–1	.159
Totals	5 coaches	36 seasons	459–590–81	.442

=== Club ===
Tenure	Coach	Years	Record	Pct.
1979–1982	Joe Ritch	3	79–4–1	.946
1982–1985	Doug Ross	3	75–17–3	.805
Totals	2 coaches	6 seasons	154–21–4	.872

== Players ==
=== 2019–20 team ===
As of October 14, 2020.

No.	Nat.	Player	Class	Pos	Height	Weight	DoB	Hometown	Previous team	NHL rights
2		Lucas Bahn	Sophomore	D	5' 11" (1.8 m)	175 lb (79 kg)	1999-09-11	Hendersonville, Tennessee	West Kelowna (BCHL)	—
3		Drew Lennon	Junior	D	6' 2" (1.88 m)	185 lb (84 kg)	1998-01-12	Bloomington, Illinois	Lone Star (NAHL)	—
4		Jay Powell	Junior	D	6' 7" (2.01 m)	200 lb (91 kg)	1997-10-01	Nashville, Tennessee	Minnesota Wilderness (NAHL)	—
6		Ayodele Adeniye	Freshman	D	6' 5" (1.96 m)	195 lb (88 kg)	1999-03-24	Columbus, Ohio	Carleton Place (CCHL)	—
7		Bauer Neudecker	Junior	F	5' 8" (1.73 m)	165 lb (75 kg)	1998-06-01	St. Louis Park, Minnesota	Sioux City (USHL)	—
9		Quinn Green	Freshman	F	5' 11" (1.8 m)	170 lb (77 kg)	1999-01-28	West Chicago, Illinois	Topeka (NAHL)	—
11		Peyton Francis	Sophomore	F	6' 1" (1.85 m)	175 lb (79 kg)	1999-04-12	Oakville, Ontario	Carleton Place (CCHL)	—
12		Connor Merkley	Senior	F	6' 1" (1.85 m)	190 lb (86 kg)	1996-09-03	Portland, Ontario	Carleton Place (CCHL)	—
13		Ben Allen	Junior	F	5' 9" (1.75 m)	175 lb (79 kg)	1997-07-31	Allen, Texas	Melfort (SJHL)	—
14		Jonah Alexander	Freshman	F	5' 11" (1.8 m)	185 lb (84 kg)	1999-11-12	Toronto, Ontario	St. Michael's (OJHL)	—
15		Joshua Corrow	Freshman	D	6' 0" (1.83 m)	190 lb (86 kg)	2000-09-21	New Port Richey, Florida	Whitecourt (AJHL)	—
16		Connor Wood	Senior	F	5' 8" (1.73 m)	180 lb (82 kg)	1996-08-09	Buford, Georgia	Odessa (NAHL)	—
18		Tyrone Bronte	Freshman	F	5' 10" (1.78 m)	165 lb (75 kg)	1999-05-07	Melbourne, Australia	Wilkes-Barre/Scranton (NAHL)	—
19		Conor Witherspoon	Freshman	F	5' 11" (1.8 m)	170 lb (77 kg)	1999-08-02	Metamora, Michigan	Shreveport (NAHL)	—
20		Mick Heneghan	Freshman	D	5' 11" (1.8 m)	170 lb (77 kg)	1999-03-02	Niles, Illinois	Northeast (NAHL)	—
21		Frank Vitucci	Freshman	F	6' 0" (1.83 m)	180 lb (82 kg)	1999-08-04	Yardley, Pennsylvania	Wellington (OJHL)	—
22		Dayne Finnson	Junior	D	5' 10" (1.78 m)	175 lb (79 kg)	1997-10-01	Arborg, Manitoba	Victoria (BCHL)	—
23		Nick Michel	Freshman	F	5' 10" (1.78 m)	180 lb (82 kg)	1999-03-16	Waconia, Minnesota	Janesville (NAHL)	—
24		Tyr Thompson	Junior	F	6' 0" (1.83 m)	180 lb (82 kg)	1998-09-26	Sherwood Park, Alberta	Whitecourt (AJHL)	—
26		Bennett Stockdale	Freshman	F	5' 11" (1.8 m)	185 lb (84 kg)	1999-06-02	Ottawa, Ontario	Johnstown (NAHL)	—
27		Brian Scoville	Freshman	D	6' 3" (1.91 m)	215 lb (98 kg)	1999-03-28	Agawam, Massachusetts	Langley (BCHL)	—
28		Noah Finstrom	Freshman	D	5' 10" (1.78 m)	175 lb (79 kg)	1999-09-17	New Baltimore, Michigan	Jamestown (NAHL)	—
30		Derek Krall	Freshman	G	6' 0" (1.83 m)	170 lb (77 kg)	1999-03-04	Crofton, British Columbia	Powell River (BCHL)	—
33		Adrian Danchenko	Sophomore	F	6' 2" (1.88 m)	185 lb (84 kg)	1999-03-29	Palm City, Florida	Wilkes-Barre/Scranton (NAHL)	—
35		George McBey	Sophomore	G	6' 2" (1.88 m)	180 lb (82 kg)	1998-04-20	Dallas, Texas	Brookings (NAHL)	—
41		David Fessenden	Sophomore	G	6' 6" (1.98 m)	230 lb (104 kg)	1998-04-30	Parker, Colorado	Northeast (NAHL)	—

=== Chargers in the NHL ===
- Jared Ross (2001–05) — Center who played for the Philadelphia Flyers of the National Hockey League in the 2008–09 and 2009–10 seasons. Ross, the son of longtime UAH coach Doug Ross, is the first player born and trained in the state of Alabama to play in the NHL.
- Cam Talbot (2007–10) — Goaltender for the Columbus Blue Jackets. Talbot has played 14 seasons in the NHL for nine teams since debuting in 2013–14 with the New York Rangers, and is a two-time NHL All-Star.
- Jay Woodcroft (1996–2000) - assistant coach for the Anaheim Ducks and former head coach of the Edmonton Oilers.
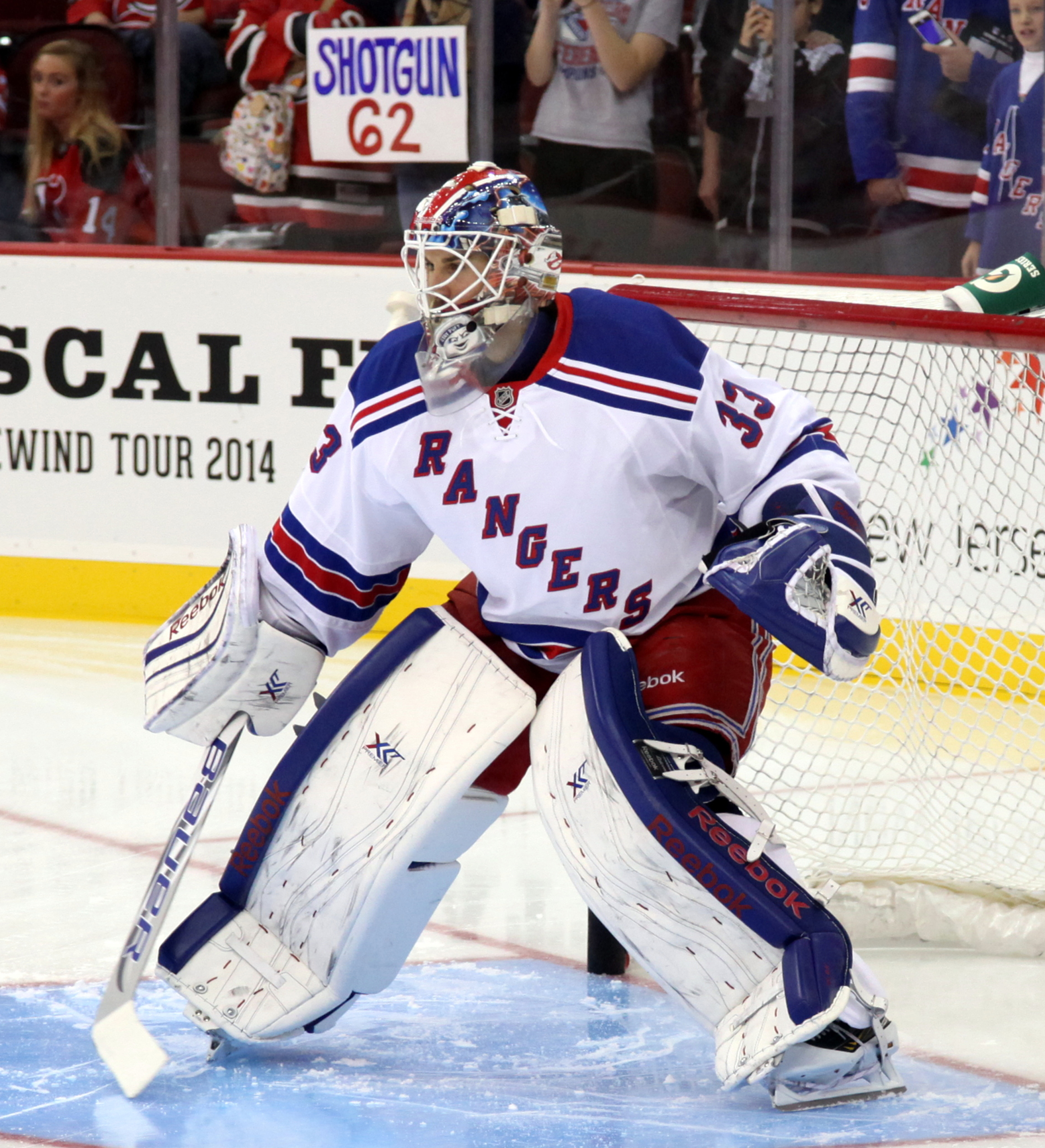
Cam Talbot

== Varsity records ==
Since the 1985–86 season through the 2015–16 season.

=== Career ===
- Most goals: 96 by Mario Mazzuca (1992–96)
- Most assists: 118 by Tony Guzzo (1993–97)
- Most points: 179 by Tony Guzzo (1993–97)
- Most penalty minutes: 467 by Shane Stewart (1996–2000)
- Most goaltending wins: 66 by Derek Puppa (1992–96)
- Lowest goals against average: 2.36 by Cedrick Billequey (1995–98)
- Highest save percentage: .918 by Scott Munroe (2002–06)
- Most shutouts: 8 by Mark Byrne (1999–2003)

=== Season ===
Individual

- Most goals: 35 by Mario Mazzuca (1995–96)
- Most assists: 42 by Shane Bowler (1994–95)
- Most points: 62 by Graham Fair (1993–94)
- Most penalty minutes: 186 by Shane Stewart (1998–99)
- Most goaltending wins: 23 by Derek Puppa (1995–96)
- Lowest goals against average: 1.79 by Cedrick Billequey (1997–98)
- Highest save percentage: .932 by Derek Puppa (1995–96)
- Most shutouts: 6 by Mark Byrne (2000–01)

Team

- Most wins: 26 (1995–96)
- Longest winning streak: 20 (February 1995–January 1996)
- Longest undefeated streak: 34 (February 1995–March 1996)
- Most goals: 201 (1997–98)
- Lowest goals against average: 1.74 (1995–96)
- Highest save percentage: .933 (1995–96)
- Most shutouts: 7 (2000–01)

=== Game ===
Individual

- Most goals: 5 by Mike O'Connor against Queens on February 27, 1988; Logan Lampert against Michigan-Dearborn on October 23, 1992; Mario Mazzuca against Nichols on February 11, 1995
- Most assists: 6 by Jim Spanier against Upsala on February 27, 1987; Stuart Vitue against Michigan-Dearborn on Oct. 23, 1992; Tony Guzzo against New England on December 30, 1996
- Most points: 7 on five occasions
- Most penalty minutes: 31 by Shane Stewart against Bemidji State on February 5, 2000
- Most saves: 76 by Carmine Guerriero against Michigan Tech on March 13, 2015
- Most saves in a shutout: 39 by Derek Puppa against Minnesota State on February 17, 1995; Scott Munroe against Robert Morris on February 26, 2005

Team

- Most goals: 23 against Sacred Heart on November 8, 1997
- Most shots on goal: 91 against Villanova on November 22, 1986
- Fewest shots on goal allowed: 8 against Stonehill on January 15, 1994, and against Southern New Hampshire on November 18, 1995

== See also ==
- Alabama–Huntsville Chargers
