= Rowley Leigh =

British chef, restaurateur and journalist

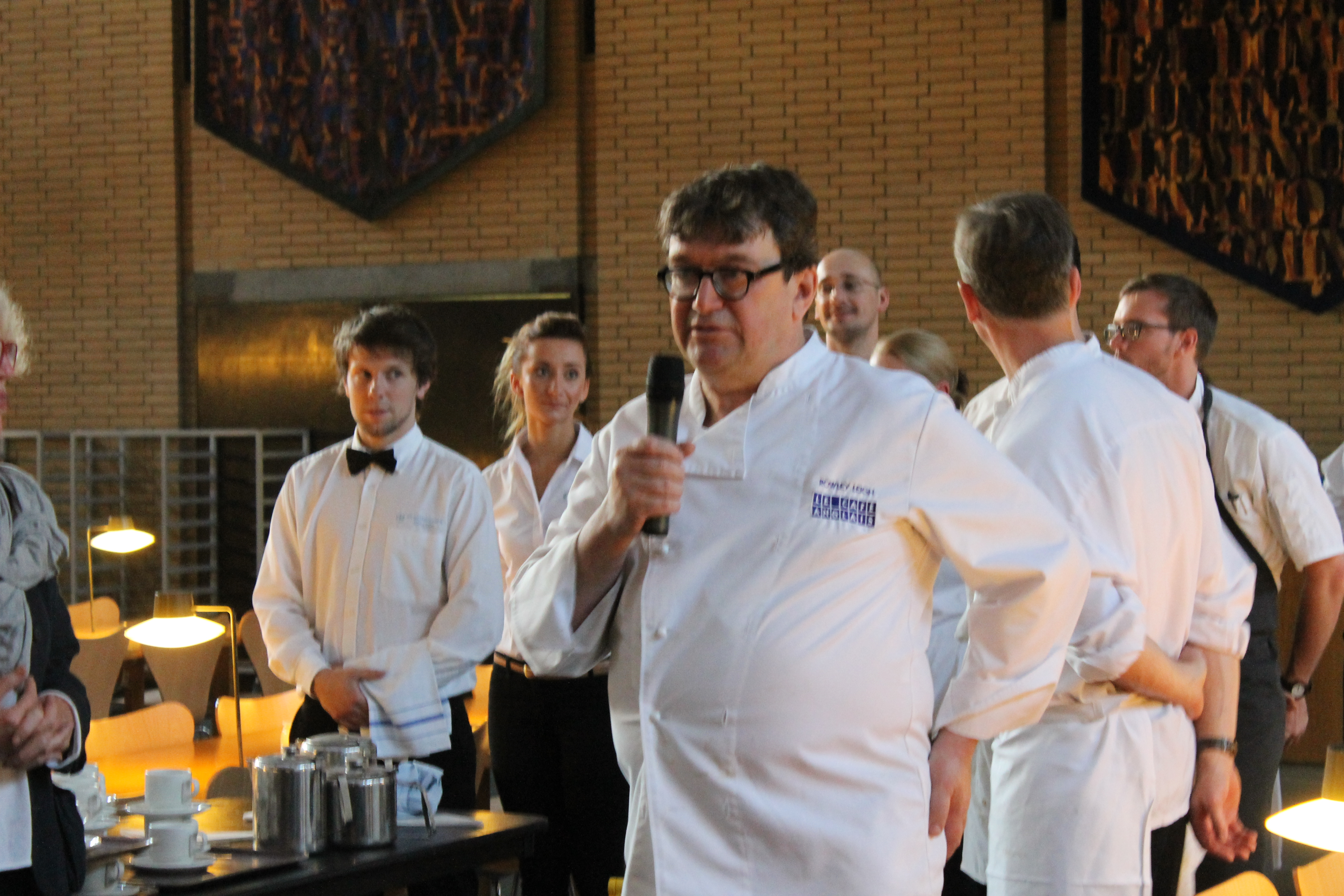
Rowley Leigh at the Oxford Symposium on Food and Cookery, 2012

Richard Rowland Leigh (born 23 April 1950), known commonly as Rowley Leigh, is a British chef, restaurateur and journalist who lives in Shepherd's Bush, London.

Born in Manchester, Leigh attended Rushmoor school in Bedford before going to Clifton College and Christ's College, Cambridge, in 1968. After Cambridge he tried his hand at farming and novel writing before falling into cooking "almost by accident" in 1977.

After a couple of years at the Joe Allen restaurant, Leigh went to work with the Roux brothers at Le Gavroche in 1979. After stints at Le Gavroche and the brothers' pastry laboratory, and, becoming buyer for the group, he took over their Le Poulbot restaurant as head chef in 1984, receiving The Times "Restaurant of the Year" award in 1986.

He opened Kensington Place restaurant with Nick Smallwood and Simon Slater in 1987, and was rewarded with the title of "Bargain Restaurant of the Year" by The Times in 1988.

In the same decade, Leigh started a career as a cookery writer, winning the Glenfiddich award three times with The Guardian, The Sunday Telegraph and the Financial Times.

Leigh left Kensington Place in December 2006 in order to open Le Café Anglais in 2007. He remained cookery correspondent of the Financial Times. His book, No Place Like Home, illustrated by Lucinda Rogers, was published in 2001 by Fourth Estate.

He is currently a consultant chef for Odeon Cinemas flagship Lounge cinema in Whiteley's.
