= 2005 CHA men's ice hockey tournament =

2005 CHA Men's ice hockey tournament
- Dates: March 11–13, 2005
- Teams: 6
- Finals site: IRA Civic Center; Grand Rapids, Minnesota
- Champions: Bemidji State (1st title)
- Winning coach: Tom Serratore (1st title)
- MVP: Matt Climie (Bemidji State)
- CHA Men's Ice Hockey Tournaments

The 2005 CHA Men's Ice Hockey Tournament was the 6th tournament in conference history and was played between March 11 and March 13, 2005, at the IRA Civic Center in Grand Rapids, Minnesota. By winning the tournament, Bemidji State received College Hockey America's automatic bid to the 2005 NCAA Division I Men's Ice Hockey Tournament.

== Format ==
The tournament featured six teams. The top two teams from the regular season received byes to the semifinals where they played the winners from the quarterfinal games. The two semifinal winners met in the championship game on March 13, 2005, with the winner receiving an automatic bid to the 2005 NCAA Division I Men's Ice Hockey Tournament.

=== Conference standings ===
Note: GP = Games played; W = Wins; L = Losses; T = Ties; PTS = Points; GF = Goals For; GA = Goals Against

2004–05 College Hockey America standings
	Conference							Overall					
	GP	W	L	T	PTS	GF	GA	GP	W	L	T	GF	GA
#15 Bemidji State†*	20	16	4	0	32	69	45	37	23	13	1	123	95
Alabama–Huntsville	20	14	5	1	29	71	43	32	18	10	4	106	79
Niagara	20	9	9	2	20	61	62	36	15	19	2	110	114
Wayne State	20	7	9	4	18	55	54	35	14	17	4	107	107
Air Force	20	5	14	1	11	41	64	36	14	19	3	82	107
Robert Morris	20	4	14	2	10	35	64	33	8	21	4	62	107
Championship: Bemidji State † indicates conference regular season champion * indicates conference tournament champion Final rankings: USA Today/USA Hockey Magazine Top 15 Poll

== Bracket ==
Quarterfinal

March 11, 2005

Semifinals

March 12, 2005

Championship

March 13, 2005

1
Bemidji State
6

4
Wayne State
3

5
Air Force
0

5
Air Force
4*

1
Bemidji State
3

2
Alabama-Huntsville
0

2
Alabama-Huntsville
4

3
Niagara
5

3
Niagara
2

6
Robert Morris
1

Note: * denotes overtime period(s)

== Tournament awards ==
=== All-Star team ===
- Goaltender: Scott Munroe (Alabama-Huntsville)
- Defensemen: Brian Gineo (Air Force), Peter Jonsson (Bemidji State)
- Forwards: Brendan Cook (Bemidji State), Brett McConnachie (Alabama-Huntsville), Ryan Miller (Bemidji State)

=== MVP ===
- Matt Climie (Bemidji State)
