= The Planning Exchange =

The Planning Exchange was a nonprofit organization established in Glasgow in 1972 as an offshoot of the Centre for Environmental Studies (CES). Its aim was to provide a source of information and discussion in the regions by bringing together the professions, leaders of civic organisations, and community action groups. Its initial focus with issues around urban and regional planning, but expanded to cover other interests and wider geographical areas.

In 2002, Idox plc acquired the assets of The Planning Exchange.

== History ==
The Planning Exchange was first proposed in 1965 during a three day conference in Churchill College in Cambridge for the Centre for Environmental Studies. Attendees for this event included architects, economists, geographers, politicians, administrative civil servants and building contractors who were aware of the issue. Also in attendance were directors of research organisations in Britain, the US, Netherlands and Japan and officials of the Ford Foundation who financed the conference.

The Planning Exchange was first officially established in Glasgow in 1972 as part of the Centre for Environmental Studies. It would later become a separate company in 1975, and gained charitable status in 1980. The first Director - Professor J.B. Cullingworth, Director of the Centre for Urban and Regional Studies at the University of Birmingham - took up his post on 1 October 1972, and was succeeded in 1975 by Tony Burton.

The Exchange developed a library and information service to carry out research projects and build a database on the development of new towns. A library of official publications, journals, books, and semi-published or grey literature was established using a system devised by Brenda White of the Planning Research Unit at Edinburgh University following her research into information needs in Town and Country Planning.

The Planning Exchange's publications include Scottish Planning and Environmental Law, to serve as a journal of record of Scottish planning. It continues to be one of the leading information sources on environmental legislation and land use planning in Scotland.

To mark the 50th anniversary of the passing of the New Towns Act 1946, the Planning Exchange was commissioned to create an electronic library of the documents, reports and plans connected with the New Towns Programme. Work commenced in 1999 to scan documents and create searchable text. The library was first released on CD and included interviews of local residents and stakeholders and images among its contents.

== Acquisition by Idox ==
In May 2002, the assets of The Planning Exchange were sold to Idox plc, and continued to be The Planning Exchange Foundation. Having no staff or assets other than the proceeds of the sale, the Foundation opted to use these funds to award research grants.

== Official Records ==
Records of the Planning Exchange are held in Glasgow City Archives.

Minute books

1. Minute book: Centre for Environmental Studies Planning Exchange Committee, 1972 – 1975
2. Minute book: Management Committee, 1981 - 1992
3. Minute book: Chairman’s Sub Committee. Also includes minutes for New Committee, 1992 - 1995 & Board Meeting, 1995 - 2000, 1984 – 1992
4. Minute book: Board Meeting, 2000 - 2002
5. Minute book: AGM, 1980

Founding History

- Memorandum and Articles of Association, 1980

Reports

- Reports on its Origin, 1965 -1972

Publications

1. The Planning Exchange: A Personal Account of its Establishment and Early Experience, 1977
2. “Planning Exchange” Article in Scottish Journal of Adult Education, 1977
3. The Planning Exchange - a brief history IN Town & Country Planning Vol 91(3) May-June 2022 pp 178-186
