= Robert Cowan (ice hockey) =

Canadian ice hockey player

- Born: September 5, 1983 (age 42) Calgary, Alberta, Canada
- Height: 6 ft 4 in (193 cm)
- Weight: 233 lb (106 kg; 16 st 9 lb)
- Position: Defence
- Shot: Left
- Played for: Port Huron Icehawks; Rio Grande Valley Killer Bees
- NHL draft: Undrafted
- Playing career: 2007–2011

Robert Cowan (born September 5, 1983) is a Canadian former professional ice hockey defenceman.

== Early life ==
Cowan was born in Calgary. He attended Robert Morris University and played with the Robert Morris Colonials, where he captained the NCAA college hockey team from 2004 to 2008, scoring one goal and 20 assists for 21 points, while earning 197 penalty minutes, in 123 games played.

== Career ==
Cowan played three years of professional hockey, including 133 regular season and 21 playoff games played with the Port Huron Icehawks of the International Hockey League, and 66 regular season games and three playoff games played with the Rio Grande Valley Killer Bees of the Central Hockey League.
