= St. Clair Beach, Ontario =

Human settlement in Ontario, Canada

Coordinates: 42.317°N 82.850°W

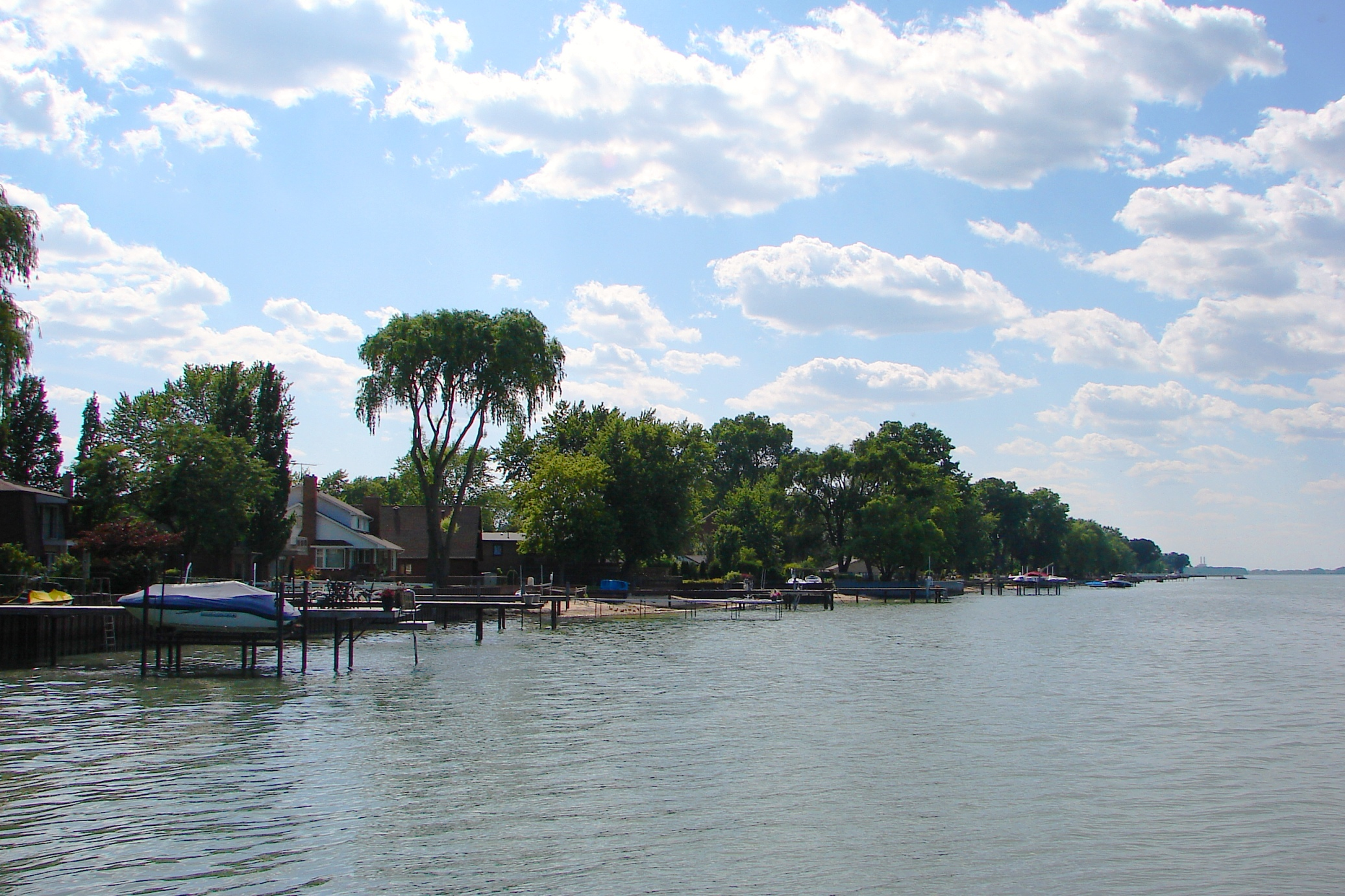
St Clair Beach

St. Clair Beach is a community on Lake Saint Clair in the town of Tecumseh, Ontario, Canada. Until 1998, the village was a separate entity (formerly part of Maidstone Township), but was amalgamated into Tecumseh.

St. Clair Beach is known for its old-fashioned street name signs along Riverside Drive, a large shopping plaza at the corner of Manning Road (Essex County Road 19) and Tecumseh Road (Essex County Road 2), a private golf course Beach Grove Golf and Country Club, scenic bike trails, and even large whiskey cellars where Hiram Walker Distillery stores its Canadian Club spirits to age for a few years (actually in neighbouring Lakeshore).
