= Western Ontario Hockey League =

Former junior ice hockey league in Ontario

- Association: Ontario Hockey Association
- Founded: 1969
- Ceased: 2007
- Last champion(s): Strathroy Rockets (2007)

The Western Ontario Hockey League (WOHL) was a junior ice hockey league in Ontario, Canada, sanctioned by the Ontario Hockey Association from 1969 until 2007. In 2007, the league became a division of the newly formed Greater Ontario Junior Hockey League along with the Mid-Western Junior Hockey League and Golden Horseshoe Junior Hockey League.

== History ==
The Western had been a part of the Big '10' until 1956, when the Eastern and Western conference were split into separate leagues—the Eastern becoming the Central, the Western becoming the Western League.

In 1968, the St. Thomas Barons, Sarnia Legionnaires, Guelph Imperials, Chatham Maroons and Brantford Foresters broke away from the Ontario Hockey Association to form a Junior "A" League known as the Western Ontario Junior A Hockey League. A year later, the OHA pulled together a bunch of local teams (the Waterloo Siskins, Stratford Warriors, Sarnia Bees, St.Marys Lincolns and the London Squires) as well as the return of the Strathroy Rockets (who had joined the Central Junior B league for a season) and formed a new Western Ontario Junior "B" Hockey League.

According to the WOJHL history, a re-organization of Ontario's Jr. B hockey teams occurred prior to the 1978/79 with the folding of the short lived Southwestern Junior B Hockey League and the Mid-Ontario Junior B Hockey League. The realignment meant that the OHA had consolidated the Southern Ontario region from 7 to 5 Junior "B" leagues. Although this marks the birth of the modern Western Ontario Jr. B league, the teams in the league did not change. In 1989, the Metro league went renegade and eventually became a Tier II Junior "A" league. In 1993, the Central league was promoted to Tier II Junior "A" as well. Since then, the OHA has operated with 3 Junior "B" leagues, but due to the talent level of these 3 league there has been a recent push to bring all three leagues to the Tier II Junior "A" level and allow for a new realignment.

From 1999 until 2001, the league changed its name to the Greater Ontario Hockey League in an attempt to drop the "Junior B" designation . The league has since referred to itself as the Western Ontario Hockey League.

In 2007, the WOHL merged with the Mid-Western Junior Hockey League and the Golden Horseshoe Junior Hockey League to become the Greater Ontario Junior Hockey League.

== Final teams ==
These are the teams that were in the league during its final independent season (2006-07).

- Chatham Maroons
- Leamington Flyers
- London Nationals
- Petrolia Jets
- St. Marys Lincolns
- St. Thomas Stars
- Sarnia Blast
- Strathroy Rockets
- Tecumseh Chiefs

== Other former members ==
- Aylmer Aces
- Belle River Bulldogs
- Michigan Americans
- Port Huron Flags
- Stratford Warriors

== Playoff Champions ==
Year	Champion	Finalist	Result in Provincials
1970	Stratford Warriors	Sarnia Bees	Lost SF vs. Dixie (Met)
1971	Stratford Warriors	St. Marys Lincolns	Lost QF vs. Petrolia (GL)
1972	St. Marys Lincolns		Lost Final vs. Markham (Met)
1973	Sarnia Bees	Stratford Warriors	Won SC vs. Toronto (Met)
1974	Sarnia Bees	St. Marys Lincolns	Lost SF vs. Hamilton (ND)
1975	London-Glencoe Squires	St. Marys Lincolns
1976	St. Marys Lincolns	Petrolia Jets	Won SC vs. Collingwood (MO)
1977	Sarnia Bees	St. Marys Lincolns	Lost QF vs. St. Catharines (GH)
1978	Windsor Royals	Petrolia Jets	Lost SF vs. Streetsville (C)
1979	Windsor Royals	Starthroy Blades	Lost SF vs. St. Catharines (GH)
1980	Windsor Royals	London Diamonds	Lost Final vs. Belleville (Met)
1981	London Diamonds	Chatham Maroons
1982	Sarnia Bees	London Diamonds	Lost Final vs. St. Michael's (Met)
1983	London Diamonds	Sarnia Bees	Lost SF vs. Stratford (MW)
1984	London Diamonds	Sarnia Bees
1985	St. Marys Lincolns	London Diamonds	Lost QF vs. St. Catharines (GH)
1986	St. Thomas Stars	Chatham Maroons	Lost SF vs. Stratford (MW)
1987	St. Thomas Stars	London Diamonds	Won SC vs. Niagara Falls (GH)
1988	St. Thomas Stars	Chatham Maroons
1989	Sarnia Bees	Chatham Mic Macs	Lost SF vs. St. Michael's (Met)
1990	Chatham Mic Macs	Sarnia Bees	Lost SF vs. Stratford (MW)
1991	Chatham Mic Macs	Sarnia Bees	Lost SF vs. Waterloo (MW)
1992	London Diamonds	Windsor Bulldogs	Lost SF vs. Kitchener (MW)
1993	Sarnia Bees	St. Marys Lincolns	Lost SF vs. Kitchener (MW)
1994	St. Marys Lincolns	Petrolia Jets	Lost in Round Robin
1995	St. Thomas Stars	Petrolia Jets	Lost Final vs. Stratford (MW)
1996	St. Thomas Stars	Leamington Flyers	Lost Final vs. Niagara Falls (GH)
1997	Strathroy Rockets	Leamington Flyers	Lost in Round Robin
1998	Chatham Maroons	St. Thomas Stars	Lost in Round Robin
1999	Chatham Maroons	St. Thomas Stars	Won SC vs. Stratford (MW)
2000	Chatham Maroons	Strathroy Rockeys	Lost in Round Robin
2001	Chatham Maroons	London Nationals	Lost in Round Robin
2002	Sarnia Blast	Chatham Maroons	Won SC vs. Elmira (MW)
2003	Petrolia Jets	Sarnia Blast	Lost in Round Robin
2004	Chatham Maroons	London Nationals	Lost in Round Robin
2005	Chatham Maroons	St. Thomas Stars	Lost Final vs. Thorold (GH)
2006	Chatham Maroons	St. Marys Lincolns	Lost in Round Robin
2007	Strathroy Rockets	Sarnia Blast	Lost Final vs. Cambridge (MW)

== Records ==
Records taken from Official Website.

- Best record: 1981-82 Sarnia Bees (36-4-2)
- Worst record: 1988-89 Tillsonburg Titans (1-39-2)
- Largest margin of victory: Leamington Flyers 30 - Windsor Bulldogs 3 on January 20, 1995
- Most goals, one season: Bill Lochead (73) -- 1970-71 Sarnia Bees
- Most assists, one season: Brian Wiseman (77) -- 1989-90 Chatham Maroons / Greg Day (77) -- 1996-97 Tecumseh Chiefs
- Most points, one season: Brian Wiseman (147) -- 1989-90 Chatham Maroons
- Most goals, career: Brent Rumble (137) -- 1995-99 Chatham Maroons
- Most assists, career: Brian Wiseman (179) -- 1987-90 Chatham Maroons
- Most points, career: Jason Baclig (324) -- 1998-2003 Leamington Flyers
- Most penalty minutes, season: Shawn Harris (408) -- 1994-95 Sarnia Bees
- Most penalty minutes, career: Tim Lantz (859) -- 1997-2000 Leamington Flyers
- Most wins by goalie, season: Scott Talbot (29) -- 2002-03 Sarnia Blast
- Most shutouts, season: Kyle Funkenhauser (8) -- 2005-06 Chatham Maroons
- Most games played by goalie, career: Paul Gibson (132) -- 2000-07 St. Thomas Stars
- Most wins by goalie, career: Paul Gibson (66) -- 2000-07 St. Thomas Stars
- Most shutouts, career: Kyle Funkenhauser (12) -- 2004-06 Chatham Maroons
