= Georgian Mid-Ontario Junior C Hockey League =

Canadian ice hockey league

Georgian Mid-Ontario Junior "C" Hockey League
- Chairman: John Tomlinson
- Headquarters: Cambridge, Ontario
- Website: GMOHL website

The Georgian Mid Ontario Junior C Hockey League is a former Junior "C" ice hockey league in Ontario, Canada, sanctioned by the Ontario Hockey Association. The Champion of the league competed for the All-Ontario Championship and the Clarence Schmalz Cup.

In the summer of 2016, the GMOHL merged into the Provincial Junior Hockey League and became the Carruthers Division in the Northern Conference.

== History ==
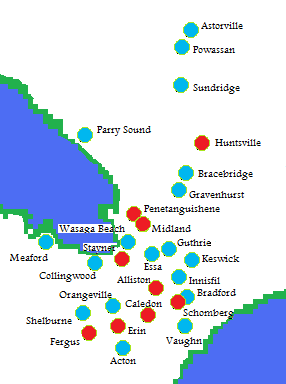
Map of GMOHL, GBJCHL, and MOJCHL teams, red are current, blue are defunct.

Dating back to the late 1940s, the Georgian Bay League featured teams like the Owen Sound Greys, Barrie Colts, and Collingwood Blues. As the top tier teams of the group were promoted to Junior B, teams to the north entered the loop in the 1960s - Powassan North Stars, Bracebridge Bears, Huntsville Blair McCann, Parry Sound Shamrocks, Gravenhurst Indians, and so on. In 1971, the South-Central Junior D Hockey League was formed with teams like the Bradford Blues, Alliston Hornets, Schomberg Cougars, and Stayner Siskins. The South-Central League became Central League Group 1 in 1973. In 1974, Powassan and the Sundridge Beavers dropped out of the Georgian Bay League, so Huntsville and Bracebridge joined the Central League for two seasons until 1977 when they found enough interest from other clubs to restart their League. During this time, the Central League had three playoff championships, Central Junior C, Georgian Bay Junior C, and Central Junior D, all representing the league at the provincial level.

When the South-Central Junior D league was promoted to Junior C, their league champion competed for the Clarence Schmalz Cup, but a second tier champion also competed for the Junior D OHA Cup. In 1974, 1975, 1976, and 1977, the Stayner Siskins competed on behalf of the then Central league for the All-Ontario Junior D title, victorious in 1974 and 1976.

The Georgian Mid-Ontario Junior "C" Hockey League is the result of the 1994 merger of the Mid-Ontario Junior "C" Hockey League and the short-lived Georgian Junior "C" Hockey League. The league began as a Junior "D" league in the early 1970s.

During the 2004-05 season, the GMOHL played an interlocking schedule with the Western Junior C Hockey League. The GMOHL won the series with 44 victories, 32 losses, and 6 ties.

In, May 2010, The OHA confirmed the welcoming of The Caledon Golden Hawks have entered the GMOHL. In March 2012, the GMOHL allowed the Huntsville Otters to join the league after recently retracting from the Ontario Junior Hockey League. With the announcement on April 16, 2015 the league accepted the Collingwood Admirals as the eleventh franchise to the Georgian Bay Mid-Ontario Hockey League. The awarding of the Collingwood franchise was challenged by the Stayner Siskins on the basis that the area did not have enough hockey players to support another franchise. Their appeal was upheld and the expansion Admirals will not participate. The Fergus Devil's announced that they are taking a leave of absence for the 2015-16 season.

== League timeline ==
Black vertical lines denote a Clarence Schmalz Cup championship. Purple vertical lines denote an OHA Cup Jr. D championship.

== The teams ==
Team	Founded	Centre	Arena
Alliston Hornets	1971	Alliston	New Tecumseth Recreation Complex
Caledon Golden Hawks	2010	Caledon	Caledon East Arena
Erin Shamrocks	1971	Erin	Erin Community Centre
Fergus Devils *	1990	Fergus	Fergus & District Community Centre
Huntsville Otters	1990	Huntsville	Canada Summit Centre
Midland Flyers	1978	Midland	North Simcoe Sports & Recreation Centre
Orillia Terriers	2013	Orillia	West Orillia Sports Complex
Penetang Kings	1977	Penetanguishene	Penetanguishene Memorial Community Centre
Schomberg Cougars	1969	Schomberg	Trisan Centre
Stayner Siskins	1972	Stayner	Stayner Memorial Arena

- - inactive for the 2015-16 season.

== 2015-16 Playoffs ==
Winner moves on to the Clarence Schmalz Cup.

Quarter-final
1	Alliston	4
8	Schomberg	0
2	Huntsville	1
7	Erin	4
3	Midland	1
6	Penetang	4
4	Stayner	2
5	Caledon	4

Semi-final
1	Alliston	4
7	Erin	2
5	Caledon	3
6	Penetang	4

Final
1	Alliston	4
6	Penetang	0

== GMO Junior "C" Champions ==
Year	Champion	Finalist	Result in Provincials
1995	Fergus Devils	Penetang Kings	Lost QF to Mount Forest (WO)
1996	Stayner Siskins	Penetang Kings	Lost QF to Mount Forest (WO)
1997	Gravenhurst Cubs	Fergus Devils	Lost QF to Kincardine (WO)
1998	Bradford Bulls	Penetang Kings	Lost QF to Kincardine (WO)
1999	Fergus Devils	Midland Thunder	Lost QF to Kincardine (WO)
2000	Fergus Devils	Stayner Siskins	Lost QF to Kincardine (WO)
2001	Fergus Devils	Stayner Siskins	Lost QF to Hanover (WO)
2002	Stayner Siskins	Erin Shamrocks	Lost QF to Kincardine (WO)
2003	Schomberg Cougars	Stayner Siskins	Lost QF to Hanover (WO)
2004	Stayner Siskins	Erin Shamrocks	Lost QF to Wingham (WO)
2005	Erin Shamrocks	Penetang Kings	Lost QF to Wingham (WO)
2006	Penetang Kings	Fergus Devils	WON CSC vs. Essex (GL)
2007	Penetang Kings	Fergus Devils	WON CSC vs. Essex (GL)
2008	Alliston Hornets	Penetang Kings	WON CSC vs. Essex (GL)
2009	Alliston Hornets	Penetang Kings	Lost Final vs. Essex (GL)
2010	Alliston Hornets	Penetang Kings	WON CSC vs. Belle River (GL)
2011	Alliston Hornets	Stayner Siskins	Lost Final vs. Grimsby (ND)
2012	Alliston Hornets	Stayner Siskins	Lost Final vs. Grimsby (ND)
2013	Alliston Hornets	Midland Flyers	Lost SF to Picton (EB)
2014	Penetang Kings	Alliston Hornets	Lost QF to Wingham (WO)
2015	Alliston Hornets	Schomberg Cougars	Lost SF to Port Hope (EB)
2016	Alliston Hornets	Penetang Kings	Lost SF to Port Hope (EB)

=== Georgian Bay Champions ===
Year	Champion	Finalist	Provincials
1978	Penetang	Bracebridge	Lost QF to Alliston (MO)
1979	Penetang	Oro	Lost SF to Bowmanville (CL)
1980	Penetang	Oro	Lost QF to Bradford (MO)
1981	Gravenhurst	Parry Sound	Lost SF to Bowmanville (CL)
1982	Penetang	Bracebridge	Won Cons. vs. Leamington (GL)
1983	Penetang	Gravenhurst	Lost SF to Lindsay (CL)
1984	Penetang	Parry Sound	WON vs. Woodstock (ND)
1985	Midland	Oro	Lost Final to Belle River (GL)
1986	Midland	Huntsville	Lost QF to Bradford (MO)
1987	Huntsville	Stayner	Lost QF to Bradford (MO)
1988	Stayner	Huntsville	Lost QF to Hanover (WO)
1989	Stayner	Huntsville	Lost QF to Hanover (WO)
1990	Parry Sound	Oro	Lost SF to Belle River (GL)
1991	Parry Sound	Penetang	Lost QF to Hanover (WO)
1992	Stayner	Innisfil	Lost Final to Belle River (GL)
1993	Stayner	Innisfil	Lost QF to Orangeville (MO)
1994	Stayner	Innisfil	Lost QF to Mount Forest (WO)

=== Mid-Ontario Champions ===
Year	Champion	Finalist	Provincials
1978	Alliston	Bradford	Lost SF to Bowmanville (CL)
1979	Alliston	Bradford	Lost QF to Penetang (GB)
1980	Bradford	Schomberg	Lost Final to Leamington (GL)
1981	Bradford	Orangeville	Lost QF to Bracebridge (GB)
1982	Alliston	Angus-Essa	Lost QF to Penetang (GB)
1983	Bradford	Orangeville	Lost QF to Penetang (GB)
1984	Alliston	Keswick	Lost QF to Penetang (GB)
1985	Bradford	Orangeville	Lost QF to Midland (GB)
1986	Bradford		Lost Final to Norwich (ND)
1987	Bradford	Fergus	Lost SF to Lakefield (C)
1988	Orangeville	Bradford	Lost QF to Mooretown (GL)
1989	Bradford	Orangeville	WON vs. Hanover (WO)
1990	Orangeville	Bradford	WON vs. Belle River (GL)
1991	Orangeville	Acton	Lost Final to Hanover (WO)
1992	Orangeville	Schomberg	Lost QF to Stayner (GB)
1993	Orangeville	Erin	Lost SF to Hanover (WO)
1994	Orangeville	Bradford	Lost QF to Rockton (ND)

=== Central League (1973-1976) ===
Year	GB Champion	Finalist	Provincials	MO Champion	Finalist	Provincials
1974				Bradford	Acton	Lost SF to Cobourg (CL)
1975	Bracebridge	Huntsville	Lost QF to Lindsay (CL)	Bradford	Acton	Lost QF to Dunnville (ND)
1976				Alliston	Bradford	Lost QF to Dunnville (ND)
1977				Alliston	Bradford	Lost SF to Bowmanville (CL)

=== Georgian Bay Junior C ===
Year	Champion	Finalist	Provincials
1964	Barrie		Lost SF to Lindsay (CL)
1965	Penetang		Lost SF to Lindsay (CL)
1966	Parry Sound		WON vs. New Hamburg (Int)
1967	Parry Sound		Lost QF to Aurora (Sub)
1968	Huntsville		Lost SF to Georgetown (Sub)
1969	Parry Sound		Lost SF to Oakville (Sub)
1970	Huntsville		Lost SF to Newmarket (Sub)
1971	Huntsville		Lost SF to Bowmanville (CL)
1972	Bracebridge	Powassan	Lost SF to Leamington (GL)
1973	Sundridge	Bracebridge	Lost QF to Gananoque (QSL)
1974	Bracebridge	Sundridge	Lost QF to Bradford (CMO)

=== South-Central Junior D ===
Year	Champion	Finalist	Provincials
1972	Fergus	Alliston	Lost SF to Exeter (W)
1973	Bradford	Fergus	WON vs. Mitchell (W)
Central Jr. D
1974	Stayner	Schomberg	WON vs. Belmont (W)
1975	Stayner	Schomberg	Lost Final to Belmont (W)
1976	Stayner	Schomberg	WON vs. Belmont (W)
1977	Stayner	Schomberg	Lost Final to Exeter (W)

== Regular season champions ==
Season	Georgian Bay	SCJDHL/Central
1971-72		Fergus Green Machine
1972-73	Sundridge Beavers	Fergus Green Machine
1973-74	Bracebridge Bears	Bradford Vasey Juniors
Season	Champion	Record	Points
1974-75	Stayner Siskins	25-5-0-0	50
1975-76	Stayner Siskins	26-4-2-0	54
1976-77	Stayner Siskins	19-4-3-0	41
Season	Georgian Bay	Mid-Ontario
1977-78	Penetang Kings	Alliston Hornets
1978-79	Penetang Kings	Alliston Hornets
1979-80	Penetang Kings	Bradford Blues
1980-81	Gravenhurst Indians	Alliston Hornets
1981-82	Bracebridge Bears	Alliston Hornets
1982-83	Gravenhurst Indians	Bradford Blues
1983-84	Penetang Kings	Orangeville Stonecrushers
1984-85	Penetang Kings	Bradford Blues
1985-86	Midland Centennials	Bradford Blues
1986-87	Stayner Siskins	Bradford Blues
1987-88	Stayner Siskins	Orangeville Crushers
1988-89	Huntsville Blair McCann	Orangeville Crushers
1989-90	Parry Sound Brewers	Orangeville Crushers
1990-91	Stayner Siskins	Orangeville Crushers
1991-92	Stayner Siskins	Orangeville Crushers
1992-93	Stayner Siskins	Orangeville Crushers
1993-94	Stayner Siskins	Orangeville Crushers
Season	Champion	Record	Points
1994-95	Penetang Kings	27-8-1-0	55
1995-96	Stayner Siskins	32-10-2-0	66
1996-97	Erin Shamrocks	24-11-1-0	49
1997-98	Bradford Bulls	24-10-2-0	50
1998-99	Midland Thunder	26-10-0-0	52
1999-00	Fergus Devils	31-5-0-0	62
2000-01	Stayner Siskins	31-5-0-0	62
2001-02	Stayner Siskins	24-11-1-0	49
2002-03	Stayner Siskins	24-9-1-2	51
2003-04	Erin Shamrocks	28-7-1-0	57
2004-05	Alliston Hornets	26-9-5-0	57
2005-06	Penetang Kings	28-8-4-2	62
2006-07	Fergus Devils	29-7-3-2	63
2007-08	Alliston Hornets	36-3-3-0	75
2008-09	Alliston Hornets	40-2-0-0	80
2009-10	Alliston Hornets	38-2-0-2	78
2010-11	Alliston Hornets	32-5-0-3	67
2011-12	Stayner Siskins	32-6-0-2	66
2012-13	Alliston Hornets	35-3-0-2	72
2013-14	Penetang Kings	30-6-0-4	64
2014-15	Alliston Hornets	32-6-0-2	66
2015-16	Alliston Hornets	36-2-3-0	73

== Former member teams ==
- Astorville Flyers, GB 1970s
- Bradford Bulls, GMO 1971-06
- Bracebridge Bears, GB 1974-78
- Caledon Flyers, MO 1976-90
- Collingwood Glassmen, MO 1977-79
- Essa 80's, MO 1980-82, GB 1983-85
- Innisfil Bruins, GB 1985-94
- Grand Valley Harvesters, GMO 1993-96
- Gravenhurst Cubs, GMO 1994-00
- Gravenhurst Indians, GB 1980-87
- Huntsville Blair McCann/Huskies, GB 1983-94
- Keswick Royals, MO 1982-86
- Meaford Monarchs, MO 1975-78
- Orangeville Crushers, MO 1975-94
- Oro 77's, GB 1977-92
- Parry Sound Shamrocks, GB 1983-91
- Powassan North Stars, GB 1970s
- Shelburne Bluebirds, MO 1971-73
- Sundridge Beavers, GB 1970s
- Vaughan Kings/Maple Trappers, MO 1978-81
- Wasaga Beach White Caps, GB 1992-93
- Woodbridge Raiders, MO 1982-84

== Professional alumni ==
National Hockey League

- Perry Anderson (Alliston 1977-78)
- Jason Arnott (Stayner 1989-90)
- Mike Fountain (Huntsville 1988-89)
- Kris King (Gravenhurst 1982-83)
- Manny Legace (Alliston 1987-88)
- John Madden (Alliston 1989-91)
- Darrin Madeley (Bradford 1984-86)
- Sandy McCarthy (Midland 1987-88)
- Brian McReynolds (Penetang 1982-84)
- Darrin Shannon (Alliston 1984-85)
- Darryl Shannon (Alliston 1983-84)
- Jeff Shevalier (Acton 1989-91)
