= Sailor (disambiguation) =

A sailor is part of a crew on a ship or boat.

Sailor may also refer to:

== Entertainment ==
- Sailor (Steve Miller Band album), a 1968 album by the Steve Miller Band
- Sailor (band), a British pop group which peaked in the mid-1970s
  - Sailor (Sailor album), a 1974 debut studio album by Sailor
- Sailor (TV series), a 1970s BBC television series
- "Sailor (Your Home is the Sea)", a 1960 German-language song by Lolita
  - "Sailor" (song), the English-language rendering by Petula Clark
- The Sailor (Mickey Newbury album), 1979
- The Sailor (Rich Brian album), 2019
- Sailor, a song by the Brian Jonestown Massacre on the 2001 album Bravery, Repetition and Noise
- Sailor Steve Costigan, a fictional character created by Robert E. Howard, in an eponymous series of stories
- The Sailor, a 1935 Arabic film by Togo Mizrahi
- The Sailor, a 2021 documentary film by Lucia Kašová

== People ==
- Sailor (surname)

=== Nickname ===
- Sailor Brown (1915–2008), English footballer
- Jimmy Herbert (1897–1968), Canadian National Hockey League player
- John Hunter (footballer, born 1878) (1878–1966), Scottish football player and manager
- Sailor Malan (1910–1963), South African Second World War RAF fighter ace
- Sailor Roberts (1931–1995), American poker player
- Sailor Stroud (1885–1970), American Major League Baseball pitcher
- Sailor Young (1876–1964), English cricketer

=== Ring name ===
- Sailor Burke, ring name of American boxer Charles Presser (1885–1960)
- Sailor Art Thomas (1924–2003), American bodybuilder and professional wrestler
- Sailor White (also Moondog King), ring name of Canadian professional wrestler Edward White (1949–2005)

== Horses ==
- Sailor (horse) (1817–1820), a British Thoroughbred racehorse
- Sailor II (foaled 1952), an American Thoroughbred racehorse

== Other uses ==
- Sailor Creek, Idaho, a tributary of the Snake River
- Sailors Run, a stream in Ohio
- Sailor hat, a type of wide-brimmed, flat-crowned straw hat
- Sailor sandwich, a sandwich popular in Richmond, Virginia
- Sailor, in brickwork terminology, a brick laid vertically on its end with the largest, broad face exposed
- Sailor, a computer network operated by Enoch Pratt Free Library on behalf of the public libraries in the State of Maryland
- Sailor, a fictional toy character in the Wee Sing 1988 video: Grandpa's Magical Toys
- Sailor (pen company), a Japanese fountain pen and ballpoint pen manufacturer founded in 1911

== See also ==
- List of Sailor Moon characters, various fictional characters whose names begin with "Sailor", including principal protagonist Sailor Moon
- Sailer (disambiguation)
- Sailor Song (disambiguation)
- Sailors (disambiguation)
- Saylor
