= Sailors (disambiguation) =

Sailors are people who work aboard a watercraft.

Sailors may also refer to:

- Sailors (film), a 1964 Swedish film
- Ken Sailors (1922-2016), American basketball player

Sports teams

- Erie Sailors, baseball teams in Pennsylvania, USA
- Goderich Sailors, ice hockey team in Ontario, Canada
- Lynn Sailors, baseball teams in Massachusetts, USA
- Port Colorne Sailors, previous name of Port Colborne Pirates, ice hockey team in Ontario, Canada
- Port Dover Sailors, ice hockey team in Ontario, Canada
- Sarnia Sailors, ice hockey team in Ontario, Canada

== See also ==
- Sailor (disambiguation)
- List of sailors
