= Erin Shamrocks =

- City: Erin, Ontario
- League: Georgian Mid-Ontario Junior C Hockey League
- Founded: 1971
- Folded: 2016
- Home arena: Erin Community Centre
- Colours: Green, Yellow, and White
- General manager: Gerry Corrigan
- Head coach: Tim Young

Franchise history
- 1971-1992: Acton Sabres; 1992-2016: Erin Shamrocks

Championships
- League champions: 2005

The Erin Shamrocks were a junior ice hockey team based in Erin, Ontario, Canada. They played in the Georgian Mid-Ontario Junior C Hockey League.

== History ==
The Acton Sabres were founded in 1971 as a member of the South-Central Junior D Hockey League. In 1973, the league was promoted and changed to the Central Ontario Junior C Hockey League. In 1976, the league changed its name to the Mid-Ontario Junior C Hockey League, but the Sabres had bigger ambitions and opted out of the league to join the Central Ontario Junior B Hockey League and compete against their local rival the Georgetown Gemini. The Sabres played in the Central Junior B League until 1984. They sat out the 1984-85 season before moving down to the Mid-Ontario Junior C Hockey League. The Sabres were no slouch in Junior B, more often celebrating winning seasons despite the odd losing season.

In 1992, the Acton Sabres moved from Acton to Erin and changed their name to the Erin Shamrocks.

In 1994, the Mid-Ontario Junior C Hockey League merged with the Georgian Bay Junior C Hockey League to create the Georgian Mid-Ontario Junior C Hockey League. Since 2002, the Shamrocks have been one of the best teams in the entire league. During the 2004-05 season, the Shamrocks pulled together and won their first Georgian Mid-Ontario league championship. This allowed for the Shamrocks to push for the dream of winning the All-Ontario championship, the Clarence Schmalz Cup. They entered the provincial quarter-final against the Western Junior C Hockey League's Wingham Ironmen but ended up losing the series 4-games-to-2. Later, the Ironmen went on to the final and lost to the Niagara Junior C Hockey League's Grimsby Peach Kings.

The 2005-06 season ended with the Shamrocks finishing in fourth place. In the league quarter-final, the Shamrocks drew the fifth seed Schomberg Cougars. The Shamrocks dropped the Cougars 4-games-to-1. Erin then had to compete against the second seeded Fergus Devils in the league semi-final. This time the Shamrocks were on the losing end, 4-games-to-1.

In 2006-07, the Shamrocks again ended the season in fourth place. They entered into the league quarter-final series with the fifth seeded Stayner Siskins and found out that they were too much to handle. The Siskins dropped the Shamrocks 4-game-to-2.

== Season-by-season results ==
Season	GP	W	L	T	OTL	GF	GA	P	Results	Playoffs
Acton Sabres
1971-72	30	14	15	1	-	180	133	29	5th SCJDHL	DNQ
1972-73	25	4	16	5	-	81	153	21	6th SCJDHL	Lost quarter-final
1973-74	30	16	10	4	-	138	111	36	3rd Central G1	Lost final
1974-75	32	17	11	4	-	121	133	38	3rd Central G1	Lost final
1975-76	32	4	22	6	-	105	167	14	9th Central G1	Lost semi-final
1976-77	42	3	37	2	-	--	--	8	8th CJBHL	DNQ
1977-78	42	4	36	2	-	--	--	10	8th CJBHL	
1978-79	43	9	31	3	-	--	--	21	11th CJBHL	
1979-80	44	3	37	4	-	195	379	10	12th CJBHL	
1980-81	44	25	13	6	-	273	228	56	5th CJBHL	
1981-82	40	13	25	2	-	205	268	28	8th CJBHL	
1982-83	42	4	35	3	-	146	349	11	8th CJBHL	
1983-84	40	10	27	3	-	159	262	23	8th CJBHL	
1984-85	Did Not Participate									
1985-86	33	11	22	0	-	200	264	22	7th MOJCHL	
1986-87	33	9	24	0	-	155	296	18	7th MOJCHL	Lost quarter-final
1987-88	36	21	14	1	-	222	130	43	2nd MOJCHL	Lost quarter-final
1988-89	36	7	28	1	-	137	257	15	6th MOJCHL	Lost quarter-final
1989-90	34	11	23	0	-	149	212	22	5th MOJCHL	Lost quarter-final
1990-91	34	21	13	0	-	--	--	42	3rd MOJCHL	Lost final
1991-92	33	14	15	4	-	170	185	32	5th MOJCHL	Lost quarter-final
Erin Shamrocks
1992-93	37	19	16	2	0	145	155	40	4th MOJCHL	
1993-94	40	16	24	0	-	196	213	32	5th MOJCHL	Lost semi-final
1994-95	36	12	23	1	-	--	--	25	8th GMOHL	
1995-96	44	28	15	1	-	242	182	57	2nd GMOHL	
1996-97	36	24	11	1	-	179	152	49	1st GMOHL	
1997-98	36	15	18	3	-	160	172	33	6th GMOHL	
1998-99	36	12	23	1	-	148	165	25	7th GMOHL	
1999-00	36	7	26	3	-	106	192	17	8th GMOHL	
2000-01	36	16	15	3	2	155	150	35	5th GMOHL	
2001-02	36	4	28	1	3	91	210	12	8th GMOHL	
2002-03	36	21	10	3	2	157	124	47	2nd GMOHL	Lost semi-final
2003-04	36	28	7	1	0	168	89	57	1st GMOHL	Lost final
2004-05	40	21	16	3	0	148	114	45	4th GMOHL	Won League
2005-06	41	23	15	3	0	164	121	49	4th GMOHL	Lost semi-final
2006-07	42	24	14	3	1	200	142	52	4th GMOHL	
2007-08	42	17	23	0	2	146	172	36	4th GMOHL	
2008-09	42	27	14	-	1	152	141	55	3rd GMOHL	
2009-10	41	21	18	-	2	150	141	44	4th GMOHL	Lost semi-final
2010-11	40	31	8	-	1	194	104	63	2nd GMOHL	
2011-12	40	26	11	-	3	192	132	55	3rd GMOHL	Lost quarter-final
2012-13	40	20	15	-	5	157	149	45	5th GMOHL	Lost quarter-final
2013-14	39	20	18	-	1	141	169	41	6th GMOHL	Lost quarter-final
2014-15	40	16	21	-	3	155	167	35	9th GMOHL	DNQ
2015-16	40	14	23	3	-	129	192	31	7th of 9 GMOHL	Won quarters 4-1 (Otters); Lost semifinals - 2-4 - (Hornets)
2016-17	Shamrocks granted a one-year leave of absence									

- 1979-1984
- 2000-2004
- 2004–2016

== Notable alumni ==
- Jeff Shevalier

Robert mair- played 2009-2012. Franchise all time leading scorer.
