= Walkerton Capitals (PJHL) =

Canadian junior ice hockey team

- City: Walkerton, Ontario
- League: Provincial Junior Hockey League
- Conference: North
- Division: Pollock
- Founded: 1973
- Home arena: Walkerton Community Centre
- Colours: Black, Red, and White
- General manager: Rory Chappelle (2025)
- Head coach: Kevin Wallace (2025)

Franchise history
- 1973–2000: Walkerton Blackhawks
- 2000–2022: Walkerton Hawks
- 2022–Present: Walkerton Capitals

The Walkerton Capitals are a Junior ice hockey team based in Walkerton, Ontario, Canada. They played in the Western Junior C Hockey League. until the 2016-17 season when the league became a division became the Pollock Division of the Provincial Junior Hockey League.

== History ==
The Walkerton Blackhawks entered the Central Ontario Junior C Hockey League in 1976, jumping up from Junior D. The Hawks finished that season with a moderate 11-24-1 record as an expansion franchise and had their first playoff berth.

In 1980, the Central League became the Grey-Bruce Junior C Hockey League as many of the further reaching teams like the Listowel Cyclones and New Hamburg Hahns left the league to pursue Junior B hockey.

In 1987, the league accepted the expansion of the Mount Forest Patriots and in 1988 renamed itself the Western Ontario Junior C Hockey League. The Walkerton Hawks have been a long running mainstay in this league. They sat out the 2004-05 season to reorganize their franchise, but have come back strong since. During their time off, ownership considered a move to Saugeen Shores, Ontario.

In the 2005-06 season, their first after their short hiatus, the Walkerton Hawks finished in fifth place. They challenged the fourth-seeded Goderich Sailors in the league quarter-final and defeated them 2-games-to-none. In the league semi-final, they competed against the league's top seeded Wingham Ironmen. The Ironmen swept the series 4-games-to-none.

The 2006-07 season saw the Walkerton Hawks step into high gear at the end of the season and push into the third seed over the Hanover Barons. In the league quarter-final, the Hawks played against the sixth seeded Goderich Sailors. Walkerton won the series 3-games-to-1. In the semi-final, the Hawks drew the second seeded Wingham Ironmen. To the dismay of the Ironmen, the Hawks swept them 4-games-to-none. This resulted in Western league final between the Walkerton Hawks and the first seeded Kincardine Bulldogs. This was the end of the road for the Hawks as the Bulldogs came out on top 4-games-to-1.

The playoffs for the 2019-20 season were cancelled due to the COVID-19 pandemic, leading to the team not being able to play a single game.

May 20, 2022 the team announced that they were re-branding the club to the Walkerton Capitals

== Season-by-season standings ==
Season	GP	W	L	T	OTL	GF	GA	P	Results	Playoffs
1973-74	27	15	10	2	-	148	111	34	2nd of 6 NJDHL	Lost semi-final (Eagles)
1974-75	27	3	23	1	-	101	223	7	7th of 7 NJDHL	DNQ
1975-76	28	5	23	0	-	68	156	10	7th of 7 NJDHL	DNQ
1976-77	36	11	24	1	-	165	232	23	6th CJCHL West	
1977-78	35	18	12	5	-	176	154	41	3rd CJCHL West	
1978-79	30	9	17	4	-	109	143	22	6th CJCHL West	
1979-80	30	17	10	3	-	169	130	37	3rd CJCHL West	
1980-81	30	18	7	5	-	165	122	41	1st GBJCHL	
1981-82	30	22	5	3	-	195	109	47	2nd GBJCHL	Won league
1982-83	30	20	8	2	-	144	114	42	2nd GBJCHL	
1983-84	30	6	20	4	-	142	206	16	5th GBJCHL	
1984-85	30	11	15	4	-	152	196	26	3rd GBJCHL	
1985-86	30	14	13	3	-	181	159	31	3rd GBJCHL	
1986-87	26	8	14	4	-	125	154	20	4th GBJCHL	
1987-88	30	11	15	4	-	126	150	26	5th GBJCHL	
1988-89	30	8	18	4	-	125	204	20	5th WJCHL	
1989-90	30	9	14	7	-	174	197	25	5th WJCHL	
1990-91	30	4	25	1	-	127	258	9	7th WJCHL	
1991-92	30	14	13	3	-	169	171	31	4th WJCHL	
1992-93	29	7	18	4	-	109	188	18	6th WJCHL	
1993-94	31	5	21	5	-	--	--	15	5th WJCHL	
1994-95	30	12	10	8	-	140	137	32	4th WJCHL	
1995-96	30	12	15	3	-	153	135	27	5th WJCHL	
1996-97	30	11	14	5	-	143	139	27	5th WJCHL	
1997-98	36	15	14	7	-	141	142	37	4th WJCHL	
1998-99	36	14	21	1	-	138	162	29	4th WJCHL	Won quarter-final 3-2 (Barons); Losy semi-final 4-1 (Ironmen)
1999-00*	35	12	16	7	-	132	160	31	4th WJCHL	Lost semi-final 1-4 (Hawks)
2000-01	38	13	21	4	-	140	174	30	4th WJCHL	Won quarter-final 3-0 (Patriots); Lost semi-final 0-4 (Barons)
2001-02	35	7	24	4	-	106	208	18	5th WJCHL	Lost quarter-final 0-3 (Patriots)
2002-03	35	23	9	-	3	160	125	49	2nd WJCHL	Lost semi-final 1-4 (Barons)
2003-04	34	14	14	3	3	120	123	34	4th WJCHL	Lost quarter-final 2-3 (Patriots)
2004-05	Did not participate									
2005-06	39	11	25	2	1	131	190	25	5th WJCHL	Won quarter-final 2-0 (Sailors); Lost semi-final 0-4 (Ironmen)
2006-07	40	29	10	0	1	196	135	59	3rd WJCHL	Won semi-final 3-1 (Sailors); Won semi-final 4-0 (Ironmen); Lost final 1-4 (Bulldogs)
2007-08	40	28	9	-	3	205	122	59	2nd WJCHL	Won semi-final 4-0 (Ironmen); Won League 4-2 (Bulldogs); Lost CSC QF 2-4 (Hornets)
2008-09	36	32	3	-	1	206	73	65	1st WJCHL	Won semi-final 4-0 (Ironmen); Won League 4-2 (Barons); Lost CSC QF 0-4 (Hornets)
2009-10	36	31	2	-	3	178	98	65	1st WJCHL	Won semi-final 4-1 (Bulldogs); Won League 4-3 (Barons); Lost CSC QF 3-4 (Hornets)
2010-11	35	31	3	-	1	238	99	63	1st WJCHL	Won semi-final 4-1 (Barons); Won League 4-3 (Hawks); Lost CSC QF 1-4 (Hornets)
2011-12	36	28	6	-	2	212	122	58	1st WJCHL	Won quarter-final 4-0 (Sailors); Won semi-final 4-1 (Ironmen); Won League 4-0 (Hawks); Lost CSC QF 1-4 (Hornets)
2012-13	36	28	5	-	3	206	93	59	1st WJCHL	Won quarter-final 4-0 (Sailors); Won semi-final 4-0 (Hawks); Won League 4-0 (Bulldogs); Lost CSC QF 2-4 (Hornets)
2013-14	35	23	6	-	6	177	121	52	2nd WJCHL	Won semi-finals 4-2 (Bulldogs); Lost final 3-4 (Ironmen)
2014-15	36	27	9	0	-	178	90	54	2nd WJCHL	Won quarters 4-1 (Hawks); Won semi-finals, 4-1 (Barons); Won League 4-3 (Ironmen); Lost CSC Quarters 3-4 (Alliston)
2015-16	36	27	8	1	-	176	112	55	1st of 7 WJCHL	Quarters - BYE; Won semi-finals, 4-3 (Hawks); Lost Finals 3-4 (Bulldogs)
2016-17	36	29	6	1	-	188	89	59	1st of 7 Pollock Div-PJHL	Quarters - BYE; Won semi-finals 4-0 (Barons); Lost Finals 3-4 (Patriots)
2017-18	40	25	12	2	1	173	126	53	2nd of 7 Pollock Div-PJHL	Won Quarters 4-1 (Barons); Won semi-final 4-2 (Bulldogs); Lost Finals 2-4 (Patriots)
2018-19	42	13	22	3	4	136	179	33	5th of 7 Pollock Div-PJHL	Won Quarters, 4-2 (Barons); Lost div semi-final 0-4 (Patriots)
2019-20	42	6	33	1	2	90	219	15	7th of 7 Pollock Div-PJHL	Lost Quarters 0-4 (Ironmen)
2020-21	Season Lost due to COVID-19 pandemic									
2021-22	32	5	21	2	4	77	160	16	6th of 7 Pollock Div-PJHL	Lost Quarters 0-4 (Patriots)
WALKERTON CAPITALS
2022-23	42	8	32	1	1	129	205	18	6th of 7 Pollock Div-PJHL	Lost Quarters 0-4 (Barons)
2023-24	42	18	20	2	2	122	133	40	5th of 8 Pollock Div-PJHL	Lost Quarters 0-4 (Whalers)
2024-25	42	11	29	2	0	122	171	24	7th of 8 Pollock Div; 13th of 16 North Conf; 51st of 63-PJHL	Lost Quarters 1-4 (Patriots)
2025-26	42	13	26	2	1	1 111	200	29	5th of 7 Pollock Div; 11th of 15 North Conf; 49th of 61-PJHL	Lost Quarters 2-4 (Bulldogs)

(*) The 1999-00 Season was altered drastically due to the folding of the Lakeshore Pirates. As a disproportionate number of games had been played by each team against Lakeshore, all history of these games was erased.

- 1976–81 & 1982–96
- 1981–82
- 1996–2004
- 2004–present

== Notable alumni ==
- Kevin Czuczman
- Lauchlin Elder (NLL lacrosse player)
- Nathan Perrott
