= Sailer (surname) =

Sailer is a surname. Notable people with the surname include:

- Chris Sailer (born 1977), American football player and trainer
- Friederike Sailer (1920–1994), German soprano
- Johann Michael Sailer (1751–1832), German Jesuit professor of theology and Bishop of Ratisbon
- Martin Sailer (born 1970), German politician
- Sebastian Sailer (1714–1777), German Premonstratensian Baroque preacher and writer
- Steve Sailer (born 1958), American journalist and film critic
- Toni Sailer (1935–2009), Austrian skier
- Verena Sailer (born 1985), German athlete

== See also ==
- Sailer (disambiguation)
- Saylor
