= Sailer =

Sailer may refer to:

- Sailer (surname)
- Sailer butterflies: the butterfly genera Neptis (typical sailers) and Pseudoneptis (blue sailers)

== See also ==
- Seiler
- Sailor (disambiguation)
- Saylor
