= Sailor Song =

Sailor Song may refer to:

- Sailor Song (novel), a 1992 novel by Ken Kesey
- "Sailor Song" (song), a 2024 single by Gigi Perez
- "The Sailor Song", a 1999 single by Toy Box
- "Sailor (Your Home is the Sea)", a 1960 German-language song by Lolita
  - "Sailor" (song), the English-language rendering by Petula Clark
- "Sailor", a song by the Brian Jonestown Massacre from the 2001 album Bravery, Repetition and Noise

== See also ==
- Sailor (disambiguation) § Entertainment
- Sea shanty (disambiguation)
