= Jordan Willis (ice hockey) =

Canadian ice hockey player (born 1975)

- Born: February 28, 1975 (age 51) Kincardine, Ontario, Canada
- Height: 5 ft 9 in (175 cm)
- Weight: 155 lb (70 kg; 11 st 1 lb)
- Position: Goaltender
- Caught: Left
- Played for: Dallas Stars; Nottingham Panthers
- National team: Canada
- NHL draft: 243rd overall, 1993; Dallas Stars
- Playing career: 1995–2002

Jordan Willis (born February 28, 1975) is a Canadian former professional ice hockey goaltender who played in one National Hockey League game for the Dallas Stars during the 1995–96 season, on January 17, 1996 against the Edmonton Oilers. He also played for the Nottingham Panthers in the British Ice Hockey Superleague between 1999 and 2001.

== Career statistics ==
=== Regular season and playoffs ===
| | | | Regular season | | | | | | | | | Playoffs |
| Season | Team | League | GP | W | L | T | MIN | GA | SO | GAA | SV% | GP | W | L | MIN | GA | SO | GAA | SV% |
|---|---|---|---|---|---|---|---|---|---|---|---|---|---|---|---|---|---|---|---|
| 1991–92 | Hanover Barons | WOJCHL | 17 | 11 | 1 | 2 | 906 | 37 | 0 | 2.45 | — | — | — | — | — | — | — | — | — |
| 1992–93 | London Knights | OHL | 26 | 13 | 6 | 3 | 1428 | 101 | 1 | 4.24 | — | 7 | 2 | 4 | 355 | 19 | 0 | 3.21 | — |
| 1993–94 | London Knights | OHL | 44 | 20 | 19 | 2 | 2428 | 158 | 1 | 3.90 | — | 1 | 0 | 0 | 8 | 1 | 0 | 7.50 | — |
| 1994–95 | London Knights | OHL | 53 | 16 | 29 | 3 | 2824 | 202 | 0 | 4.29 | — | 3 | 0 | 3 | 165 | 15 | 0 | 5.45 | — |
| 1995–96 | Dallas Stars | NHL | 1 | 0 | 1 | 0 | 19 | 1 | 0 | 3.20 | .895 | — | — | — | — | — | — | — | — |
| 1995–96 | Michigan K-Wings | IHL | 38 | 17 | 9 | 9 | 2184 | 118 | 1 | 3.24 | .895 | 4 | 1 | 3 | 238 | 17 | 0 | 4.29 | .853 |
| 1996–97 | Canadian National Team | Intl | 15 | 7 | 4 | 2 | 804 | 42 | 0 | 3.13 | — | — | — | — | — | — | — | — | — |
| 1996–97 | Dayton Bombers | ECHL | 8 | 4 | 4 | 0 | 429 | 25 | 0 | 3.50 | .895 | — | — | — | — | — | — | — | — |
| 1996–97 | Michigan K-Wings | IHL | 2 | 0 | 2 | 0 | 102 | 8 | 0 | 4.70 | .890 | — | — | — | — | — | — | — | — |
| 1997–98 | Michigan K-Wings | IHL | 31 | 8 | 18 | 2 | 1584 | 93 | 1 | 3.52 | .879 | — | — | — | — | — | — | — | — |
| 1998–99 | Baton Rouge Kingfish | ECHL | 47 | 19 | 20 | 5 | 2521 | 131 | 4 | 3.12 | .903 | 6 | 3 | 3 | 374 | 18 | 1 | 2.89 | .929 |
| 1999–00 | Nottingham Panthers | BISL | 40 | — | — | — | 2344 | 141 | 0 | 3.61 | .884 | 6 | — | — | — | — | — | 4.31 | .865 |
| 2000–01 | Nottingham Panthers | BISL | 40 | — | — | — | 2300 | 119 | 0 | 3.10 | .903 | 5 | — | — | — | — | — | 2.79 | .915 |
| 2001–02 | Roanoke Express | ECHL | 28 | 11 | 9 | 5 | 1451 | 81 | 0 | 3.35 | .890 | — | — | — | — | — | — | — | — |
| NHL totals | | | 1 | 0 | 1 | 0 | 19 | 1 | 0 | 3.20 | .929 | — | — | — | — | — | — | — | — |

== See also ==
- List of players who played only one game in the NHL
