= Western Ontario Junior C Hockey League =

Western Ontario Junior "C" Hockey League
Head Office	Cambridge, Ontario
Official Website	WJCHL
Convenor	Bill Fisher
Chairman	John Kastner
Operated	1966–2016
Provincial Titles	7

The Western Ontario Junior C Hockey League was a Junior "C" ice hockey league in Ontario, Canada, sanctioned by the Ontario Hockey Association. The Champion of the Western will compete for the All-Ontario Championship and the Clarence Schmalz Cup. The WOJCHL merged into the Provincial Junior Hockey League in the Summer of 2016.

Western Junior "C" Hockey League 1966–1970
Central Junior "C" Hockey League 1970–1980
Grey-Bruce Junior "C" Hockey League 1980–1988
Western Ontario Junior "C" Hockey League 1988–2016

== History ==
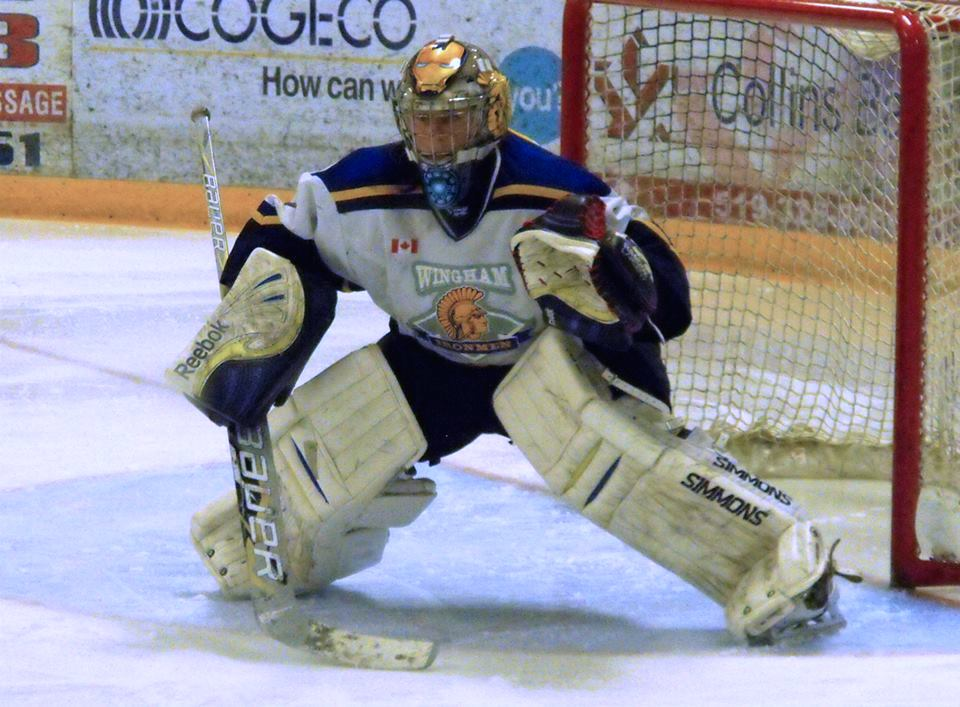
Wingham Ironmen goalie during 2014 Clarence Schmalz Cup playoffs.

The Western Junior C Hockey League was founded in 1966 when the original OHA Central Junior C Hockey League, a large league, was divided up. In 1970, the Western league changed its name to the Central league. A couple years later, another league from the old Central league, the Intercounty Jr. C league merged with the new Central league. Brought into the fold was the Caledonia Corvairs who won the league and the Clarence Schmalz Cup in 1973, then jumped to the Junior B level.

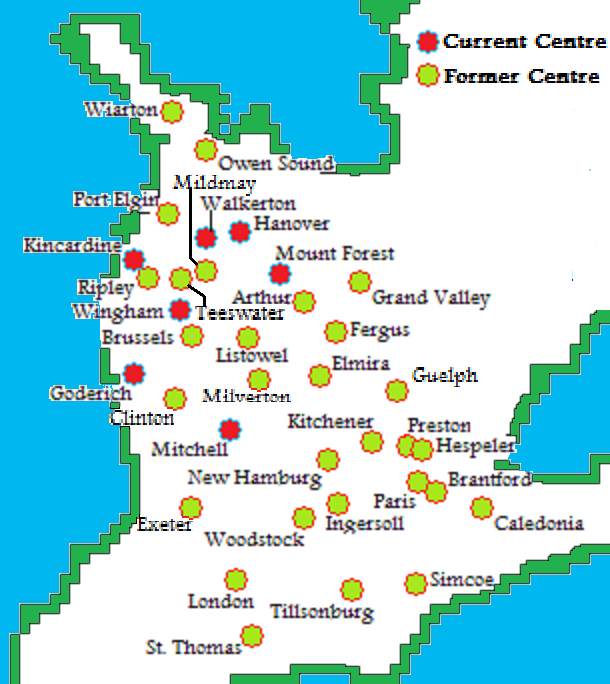
Locations of teams in the Western League.

In 1969, the Hanover Hurricanes made the jump from the Western Junior D Hockey League to the Central Junior "C". Early powerhouses in the league were the Listowel Cyclones, Kincardine Kinucks, and New Hamburg Hahns. The Hanover Barons are the only remaining team that is still a member from the founding of the league in 1966. They won two Clarence Schmalz Cups while playing in the league and dominated in the 1960s. They were promoted to Junior "B" in 1977. The league became one of at least four different leagues in the OHA to be known as the Central Jr. C league since 1960. The league may have changed its name in 1970 to the Grey-Bruce Junior C Hockey League. This lasted until 1988, as the league granted expansion to 2 teams that were not in Grey or Bruce County—in 1987, the Mount Forest Patriots and in 1989, the Brussels Bulls. In 1988, the league donned its present name, the Western Junior "C" Hockey League.

From 1972 until 1976, the Central league (now the Western league) featured a variety of teams from the Niagara region of Ontario. In 1974, the majority of these teams broke away to form the Niagara & District Junior C Hockey League. In 1976, the remainder of these teams walked away to form the Southwestern Junior B Hockey League, which folded in 1978 and the remaining teams went mostly to the Niagara District league to help form a Western division.

In 1987, the Port Elgin Bears withdrew from a playoffs series due to perceived on-ice violence by the Hanover Barons. The OHA investigated the incident, which received national publicity when Port Elgin's coach was supported by Otto Jelinek, the Canadian Minister of State for Fitness and Amateur Sport. Port Elgin team officials were given one-year suspensions when the OHA found no evidence to justify abandoning the series.

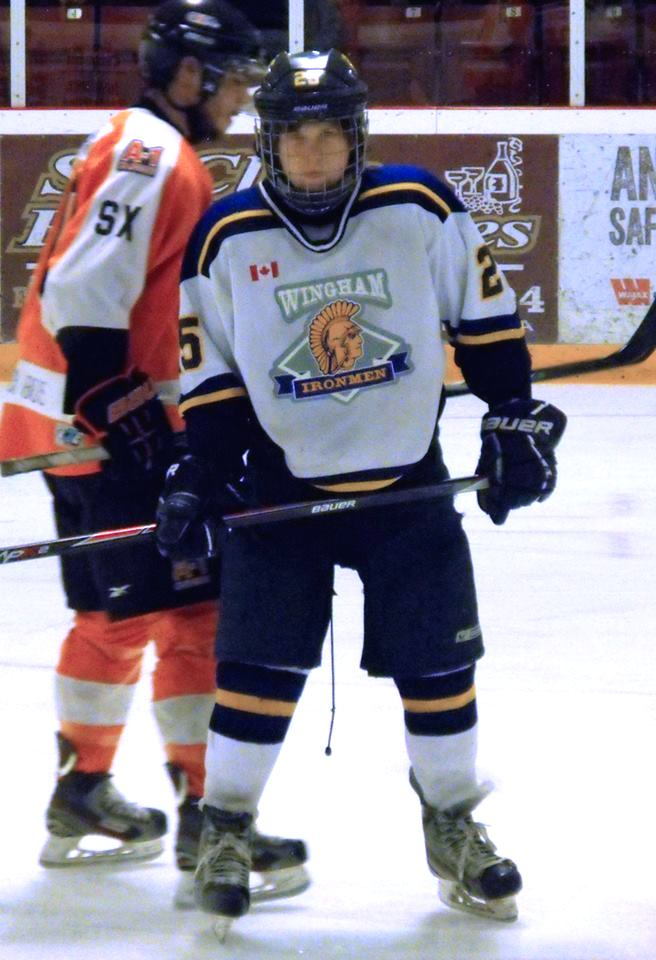
Wingham Ironmen player during 2014 Clarence Schmalz Cup playoffs.

During the 2004-05 season, the WJCHL played an interlocking schedule with the Georgian Mid-Ontario Junior C Hockey League. The WJCHL lost the series with 44 losses, 32 victories, and 6 ties.

On May 29, 2008, the Western league and the Ontario Hockey Association allowed for the Mitchell Hawks to move from the more southerly Southern Ontario Junior Hockey League and into the Western league for the 2008-09 season. This marks the second time the Hawks have been in the loop, the first being the mid-1960s. Also, they share the same name as the Walkerton Hawks, although Walkerton's name is from the raptor (since 1999), while Mitchell's is from the Native Chief.

In 2012, the OHA entered into talks with the Western League and the Southern Ontario Junior Hockey League. If successful, the northern half of the SOJHL would become the "Southern Division" of the WOJCHL, while the original teams would form a "Northern Division". In the Summer of 2013, the OHA opted to realign the SOJHL with the Niagara & District Junior C Hockey League instead. The northern half of the SOJHL remained the SOJHL, while the southern half merged with the NDJCHL. Weeks later the OHA announced that the Eastern Division of the NDJCHL would remain as the Niagara League, while the West would break off and form a new Midwestern Junior C Hockey League.

== The teams ==
Team	Founded	Centre	Arena
Goderich Flyers	2003	Goderich	Goderich & District Community Centre
Hanover Barons	1964	Hanover	P&H Centre
Kincardine Bulldogs	1994	Kincardine	Davidson Centre Arena
Mitchell Hawks	1966	Mitchell	Mitchell & District Arena
Mount Forest Patriots	1987	Mount Forest	Mount Forest & District Community Centre
Walkerton Hawks	1976	Walkerton	Walkerton Community Centre
Wingham Ironmen	1975	Wingham	North Huron Wescast Community Complex

== 2015–16 League Playoffs ==
Quarter-finals
4	Mitchell	4
5	Wingham	2
2	Kincardine	4
7	Goderich	0
3	Mount Forest	4
6	Hanover	3

Semi-finals
1	Walkerton	4
4	Mitchell	0
2	Kincardine	4
3	Mount Forest	3

Finals
1	Walkerton	3
2	Kincardine	4

== Western Junior "C" Champions ==
Year	Champion	Finalist	Result in Provincials
Western League
1967	New Hamburg Hahns	Elmira Lumber Kings	Won OHA Jr. C vs. Aurora (Sub)
1968	New Hamburg Hahns		Lost Final to Georgetown (Sub)
1969	New Hamburg Hahns	Exeter Hawks	Lost SF to Woodstock (IC)
1970	Hespeler Shamrocks		Lost Final to Newmarket (Sub)
Central Group 2/3
1971	Hanover Hurricanes		Lost SF to Dresden (GL)
1972	New Hamburg Hahns		Lost QF to Leamington (GL)
1973	Caledonia Corvairs	New Hamburg Hahns	Won OHA Jr. C vs. Lindsay (CL)
--	Rep. for Super C Playdowns: Woodstock Navy-Vets		Won Super Jr. C vs. Kitchener (WJBHL)
1974	Woodstock Navy-Vets	Simcoe Jets	Won Super Jr. C vs. Owen Sound (NJDHL)
--	Rep. for Jr. C Playdowns: Simcoe Jets		Lost Final to Cobourg (CL)
1975	New Hamburg Hahns		Lost SF to Essex (GL)
--	Rep. for Super C Playdowns: Woodstock Navy-Vets		Won Super Jr. C vs. Owen Sound
1976	Clinton Mustangs	Woodstock Navy-Vets	Lost SF to Essex (GL)
--	Rep. for Super C Playdowns: Woodstock Navy-Vets		Won Super Jr. C vs. Brantford
1977	Listowel Cyclones		Lost SF to Essex (GL)
1978	Listowel Cyclones		Lost QF to Essex (GL)
1979	Kincardine Kinucks		Lost Final to Bowmanville (CL)
1980	Port Elgin Bears		Lost QF to Leamington (GL)
Grey-Bruce League
1981	Wingham Ironmen		Lost QF to Essex (GL)
1982	Walkerton Blackhawks		Lost QF to Leamington (GL)
1983	Kincardine Kinucks		Lost QF to Leamington (GL)
1984	Wingham Ironmen	Port Elgin Bears	Lost QF to Dresden (GL)
1985	Hanover Barons	Port Elgin Bears	Lost QF to Essex (GL)
1986	Hanover Barons	Port Elgin Bears	Lost QF to Essex (GL)
1987	Hanover Barons	Port Elgin Bears	Lost SF to Norwich (ND)
1988	Hanover Barons		Lost SF to Port Perry (C)
Western League
1989	Hanover Barons	Wingham Ironmen	Lost Final to Bradford (MO)
1990	Hanover Barons	Brussels Bulls	Lost QF to Parry Sound (GB)
1991	Hanover Barons	Brussels Bulls	Won OHA Jr. C vs. Orangeville (MO)
1992	Hanover Barons	Brussels Bulls	Lost QF to Belle River (GL)
1993	Hanover Barons	Brussels Bulls	Lost Final to Napanee (EB)
1994	Mount Forest Patriots	Hanover Barons	Lost SF to Belle River (GL)
1995	Mount Forest Patriots	Brussels Bulls	Lost SF to Bowmanville (C)
1996	Mount Forest Patriots		Lost SF to Napanee (EB)
1997	Kincardine Bulldogs		Lost SF to Belle River (GL)
1998	Kincardine Bulldogs	Hanover Barons	Lost Final to Glanbrook (ND)
1999	Kincardine Bulldogs	Wingham Ironmen	Lost SF to Wallaceburg (GL)
2000	Kincardine Bulldogs	Wingham Ironmen	Lost SF to Belle River (GL)
2001	Hanover Barons	Kincardine Bulldogs	Lost SF to Belle River (GL)
2002	Kincardine Bulldogs	Hanover Barons	Lost SF to Uxbridge (CO)
2003	Hanover Barons	Kincardine Bulldogs	Lost SF to Georgina (CO)
2004	Wingham Ironmen	Kincardine Bulldogs	Lost Final to Grimsby (ND)
2005	Wingham Ironmen	Kincardine Bulldogs	Lost SF to Essex (GL)
2006	Kincardine Bulldogs	Wingham Ironmen	Lost QF to Penetang (GMO)
2007	Kincardine Bulldogs	Walkerton Hawks	Lost QF to Penetang (GMO)
2008	Walkerton Hawks	Kincardine Bulldogs	Lost QF to Alliston (GMO)
2009	Walkerton Hawks	Hanover Barons	Lost QF to Alliston (GMO)
2010	Walkerton Hawks	Hanover Barons	Lost QF to Alliston (GMO)
2011	Walkerton Hawks	Mitchell Hawks	Lost QF to Alliston (GMO)
2012	Walkerton Hawks	Mitchell Hawks	Lost QF to Alliston (GMO)
2013	Walkerton Hawks	Kincardine Bulldogs	Lost QF to Alliston (GMO)
2014	Wingham Ironmen	Walkerton Hawks	Lost SF to Essex (GL)
2015	Walkerton Hawks	Wingham Ironmen	Lost QF to Alliston (GMO)
2016	Kincardine Bulldogs	Walkerton Hawks	Lost QF to Alliston (GMO)

- A Red Row indicates a team representing the league in the Super Jr. C Playdowns without being the known league champion.
- A Blue Row indicates a team representing the league in the OHA Jr. C Playdowns without being the known league champion.

== Regular season champions ==
Season	Champion	Record	Points
Western League
1966–67	New Hamburg Hahns	15-6-3-0	33
1967–68
1968–69	New Hamburg Hahns	23-3-4-0	50
1969–70	Hespeler Shamrocks	20-4-1-0	41
Central Group 2/3
1970–71	New Hamburg Hahns	27-3-2-0	56
1971–72
1972–73	Caledonia Corvairs	24-5-3-0	51
1973–74	Woodstock Navy-Vets	26-3-2-0	54
1974–75	Woodstock Navy-Vets	32-2-2-0	66
1975–76	New Hamburg Hahns	26-8-1-0	53
1976–77	Listowel Cyclones	28-7-1-0	57
1977–78	Listowel Cyclones	25-8-2-0	52
1978–79	Kincardine Kinucks	21-5-4-0	46
1979–80	Port Elgin Bears	19-5-6-0	44
Grey-Bruce League
1980–81	Walkerton Blackhawks	18-7-5-0	41
1981–82	Kincardine Kinucks	23-6-1-0	47
1982–83	Kincardine Kinucks	25-3-1-0	51
1983–84	Wingham Ironmen	19-8-3-0	41
1984–85	Hanover Barons	28-0-2-0	58
1985–86	Hanover Barons	24-2-4-0	52
1986–87	Hanover Barons	23-2-0-0	46
1987–88	Hanover Barons	25-2-3-0	53
Western League
1988–89	Hanover Barons	21-6-3-0	45
1989–90	Hanover Barons	22-6-2-0	46
1990–91	Hanover Barons	24-4-2-0	50
1991–92	Hanover Barons	25-2-3-0	53
1992–93	Hanover Barons	26-1-2-0	54
1993–94	Mount Forest Patriots	22-6-4-0	48
1994–95	Mount Forest Patriots	21-3-5-0	47
1995–96	Hanover Barons	22-5-3-0	47
1996–97	Kincardine Bulldogs	21-3-4-0	46
1997–98	Kincardine Bulldogs	28-5-2-0	58
1998–99	Kincardine Bulldogs	30-3-3-0	63
1999-00	Kincardine Bulldogs	30-1-3-0	63
2000-01	Hanover Barons	34-3-2-0	70
2001-02	Kincardine Bulldogs	27-7-1-0	55
2002-03	Kincardine Bulldogs	24-8-0-3	51
2003-04	Wingham Ironmen	25-5-4-0	54
2004-05	Wingham Ironmen	30-4-4-2	66
2005-06	Wingham Ironmen	32-5-2-1	67
2006-07	Kincardine Bulldogs	32-5-0-2	66
2007-08	Kincardine Bulldogs	36-3-0-1	73
2008-09	Walkerton Hawks	32-3-0-1	65
2009-10	Walkerton Hawks	31-2-0-3	65
2010-11	Walkerton Hawks	31-3-0-1	63
2011-12	Walkerton Hawks	28-6-0-2	58
2012–13	Walkerton Hawks	28-5-0-3	59
2013–14	Wingham Ironmen	26-6-0-3	55
2014–15	Wingham Ironmen	29-7-0-0	58
2015–16	Walkerton Hawks	27-8-1-0	55

== Former Member Teams ==
Arthur Eagles (1978–1980)
Brantford Penguins (1974–1976)
Brussels Bulls (1989–1999)
Caledonia Corvairs (1972–1973)
Clinton Mustangs (1974–1985)
Elmira Sugar Kings (1966–1970)
Exeter Hawks (1968–1969)
Fergus Green Machine (1980–1982)
Grand Valley Harvesters (1989–1993)
Hespeler Shamrocks (1966–1970)
Ingersoll Marlands (1973–1976)
New Hamburg Hahns (1966–1977)
Kitchener Flying Dutchmen (19xx-1973)
Listowel Cyclones (1972–1979)
London Optimists (19xx-1976)
Owen Sound Salvagemen (1974–1975)
Paris-Burford Flyers (1972–1974)
Port Elgin Bears (1976–1989)
Preston Raiders (1966–1969)
St. Thomas Colonels (1972–1973)
Simcoe Jets (1972–1974)
Tillsonburg Titans (1974–1976)
Wiarton Wolves (1994–2003)
Woodstock Navy-Vets (1972–1976)

== Professional alumni ==
National Hockey League

- Kevin Czuczman (Walkerton 2008-09)
- Louie DeBrusk (Port Elgin 1986–87)
- Aaron Downey (Grand Valley 1990–91)
- Paul MacDermid (Port Elgin 1979–80)
- Jeff MacMillan (Hanover 1995–96)
- Jim Nahrgang (New Hamburg 1966–67)
- Nathan Perrott (Walkerton 1992–93)
- Kevin Pollock (Hanover)
- Curtis Sanford (Wiarton 1994–95)
- Darryl Sittler (Elmira 1966–67)
- Jordan Willis (Hanover 1991–92)

== See also ==
- Provincial Junior Hockey League for PJHL Pollock Division
