= Wingham Ironmen =

Canadian junior ice hockey team

- City: Wingham, Ontario
- League: Provincial Junior Hockey League
- Conference: North
- Division: Pollock
- Founded: 1973
- Home arena: North Huron Wescast Community Complex
- Colours: Blue, Yellow, and White
- General manager: Chad Haggitt (2024)
- Head coach: Chris Stewart (2024)

The Wingham Ironmen are a Junior ice hockey team based in Wingham, Ontario, Canada. They began play in the Northern Junior D Hockey League and eventually moved up to the Western Junior C Hockey League where they played until the 2016-17 season when the league became part of the Provincial Junior Hockey League (PJHL) as the Pollock Division.

== History ==
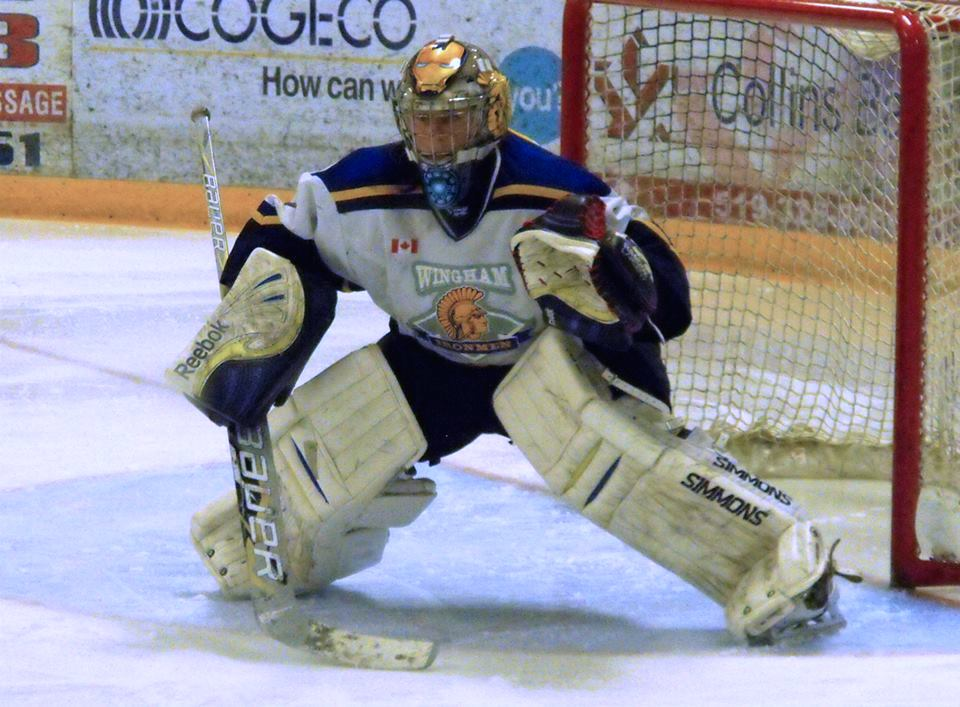
Ironmen goalie during 2014 Clarence Schmalz Cup playoffs.

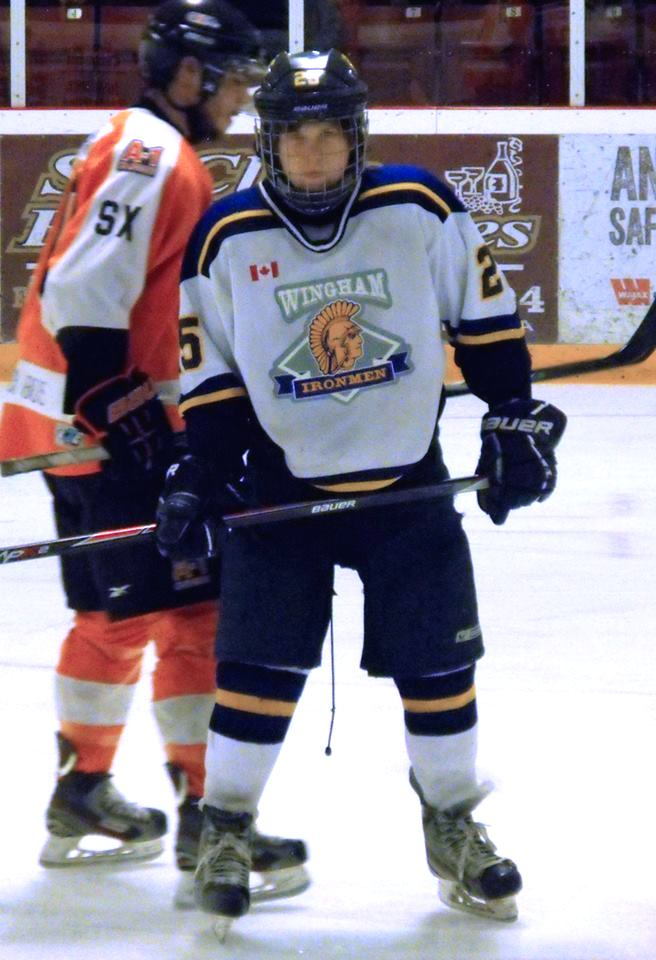
Ironmen player during 2014 Clarence Schmalz Cup playoffs.

Founded in 1973, the Ironmen started out in Northern Junior D Hockey League where they played for six seasons. After some success at the Junior D level, the Ironmen joined the Central Junior C Hockey League in 1979.

In 1980, the league changed its name to the Grey-Bruce Junior C Hockey League to reflect the centralization of the league in Grey-Bruce counties region. The Ironmen won the league playoffs that year and advanced to the Clarence Schmalz Cup playoffs for the first time. Unfortunately, the Ironmen lost to the eventual finalist Essex 73's 4 games-to-1.

After two poor seasons, the Ironmen stormed back to the top of the standings winning the league and advancing to the Schmalz Cup playoffs yet again in 1984. However, the Great Lakes Junior Hockey League's Dresden Kings overwhelmed the Ironmen in four straight games to advance to the semi-finals.

In 1988, the Ironmen had a strong season by finishing second in the regular season standings and advancing to the playoff finals, However, the Ironmen did not participate in league play the following 1989-90 season.

In 2003-04, the Ironmen won the Western league title and went on to compete in the All-Ontario Clarence Schmalz Cup playoffs. In the quarter-final round, the Ironmen defeated the Stayner Siskens of the Georgian Mid-Ontario Junior C Hockey League in a hard fought seven game series. Waiting for them in the semi-finals were the Dresden Kings but the Ironmen were ready. Wingham made quick work of Dresden emerging with a 4-games-to-1 series win. In the finals, their competition was the Niagara Junior C Hockey League's Grimsby Peach Kings who swept the Ironmen to win the provincial title.

The 2004-05 season saw the Ironmen take first place in the league. In the league semi-final, the played against the fourth seeded Goderich Sailors and defeated them 4-games-to-none. In the league final, the Ironmen drew their most common foe, the Kincardine Bulldogs. In a hard-fought battle, the Ironmen found themselves down 3-games-to-2 to the Bulldogs. In Game 6, the Ironmen came to play and defeating the Bulldogs 5-1. The decisive Game 7 ended with a 4–2 victory for Wingham. As Western league champions, the Ironmen found themselves competing for the Schmalz Cup again. In the provincial quarter-final, the Ironmen drew the Georgian Mid-Ontario Junior C Hockey League's Erin Shamrocks. The Ironmen defeated them 4-games-to-2. In the semi-finals, the Ironmen drew the challenging Great Lakes Junior C Hockey League's Essex 73's. The 73's were too much for the Ironmen to handle and they swept Wingham 4-games-to-none.

In 2005-06, the Ironmen finished in first place again. They received a bye to the league semi-final. In the semi-final, the Ironmen were up against the Walkerton Hawks, whom they swept 4-games-to-none. In the league final, the Ironmen mixed it up with the Kincardine Bulldogs but were eliminated 4-games-to-1.

The 2006-07 regular season ended with the Ironmen in second place. They again had a bye to the league semi-final. In the semi-final, the Ironmen ran into the Walkerton Hawks squad who defeated the Ironmen, 4-games-to-none.

== Season-by-season standings ==
| Season | GP | W | L | T | OTL | GF | GA | P | Results | Playoffs |
|---|---|---|---|---|---|---|---|---|---|---|
| 1973-74 | 27 | 15 | 9 | 3 | | 161 | 107 | 33 | 3rd NJDHL | Group Champions |
| 1974-75 | 28 | 18 | 6 | 4 | - | 196 | 114 | 40 | 3rd NJDHL | Won semi-final, 4-3 (Bears); Lost final, 0-4 (Eagles) |
| 1975-76 | 28 | 20 | 5 | 3 | | 171 | 93 | 43 | 1st NJDHL | Group Champions |
| 1976-77 | 24 | 13 | 7 | 4 | | 167 | 100 | 30 | 3rd NJDHL | |
| 1977-78 | 24 | 19 | 5 | 0 | | 155 | 69 | 38 | 1st Jr D Grp #6 | Group Champions |
| 1978-79 | | | | | | | | 1st Jr D Grp #6 | Group Champions | |
| 1979-80 | 29 | 17 | 10 | 2 | - | 172 | 117 | 36 | 4th CJCHL West | |
| 1980-81 | 30 | 18 | 8 | 4 | - | 154 | 182 | 40 | 2nd GBJCHL | Won league, lost CSC QF |
| 1981-82 | 30 | 7 | 23 | 0 | - | 99 | 177 | 14 | 6th GBJCHL | |
| 1982-83 | 30 | 6 | 20 | 4 | - | 119 | 170 | 16 | 6th GBJCHL | |
| 1983-84 | 30 | 19 | 8 | 3 | - | 187 | 123 | 41 | 1st GBJCHL | Won league, lost CSC QF |
| 1984-85 | 30 | 14 | 12 | 4 | - | 152 | 153 | 32 | 2nd GBJCHL | |
| 1985-86 | 30 | 2 | 26 | 2 | - | 126 | 241 | 4 | 6th GBJCHL | |
| 1986-87 | 24 | 9 | 11 | 4 | - | 120 | 150 | 22 | 3rd GBJCHL | |
| 1987-88 | 30 | 13 | 14 | 3 | - | 167 | 171 | 29 | 3rd GBJCHL | |
| 1988-89 | 30 | 20 | 6 | 4 | - | 229 | 138 | 44 | 2nd WJCHL | |
| 1989-90 | Did not participate | | | | | | | | | |
| 1990-91 | 30 | 12 | 14 | 4 | - | 126 | 149 | 28 | 4th WJCHL | |
| 1991-92 | 29 | 7 | 18 | 4 | - | 129 | 173 | 18 | 6th WJCHL | |
| 1992-93 | 30 | 17 | 9 | 4 | - | 180 | 141 | 38 | 3rd WJCHL | |
| 1993-94 | 31 | 18 | 7 | 6 | - | -- | -- | 42 | 2nd WJCHL | |
| 1994-95 | 30 | 13 | 12 | 5 | - | 152 | 135 | 31 | 5th WJCHL | |
| 1995-96 | 29 | 14 | 11 | 4 | - | 162 | 120 | 32 | 4th WJCHL | |
| 1996-97 | 30 | 16 | 9 | 5 | - | 152 | 107 | 37 | 2nd WJCHL | |
| 1997-98 | 35 | 27 | 7 | 1 | - | 164 | 87 | 55 | 2nd WJCHL | |
| 1998-99 | 35 | 28 | 6 | 1 | - | 154 | 78 | 57 | 2nd WJCHL | Won quarter-final 3-0 (Patriots); Won semi-final 4-1 (Patriots); Lost Final 3-4 (Bulldogs) |
| 1999-00* | 35 | 23 | 10 | 2 | - | 182 | 94 | 48 | 2nd WJCHL | Won semi-final 4-3 (Barons); Lost Final 1-4 (Bulldogs) |
| 2000-01 | 39 | 8 | 29 | 2 | - | 100 | 199 | 18 | 5th WJCHL | Lost quarter-final 0-3 (W Hawks) |
| 2001-02 | 35 | 21 | 11 | 3 | - | 152 | 118 | 45 | 3rd WJCHL | Won quarter-final 3-1 (Wolves); Lost semi-final 1-4 (Barons) |
| 2002-03 | 35 | 21 | 11 | - | 3 | 151 | 117 | 45 | 4th WJCHL | Won quarter-final 3-0 (Patriots); Lost semi-final 3-4 (Bulldogs) |
| 2003-04 | 34 | 25 | 5 | 4 | 0 | 177 | 99 | 54 | 1st WJCHL | Won semi-final 4-0 (Patriots); Won League 4-1 (Bulldogs); Won CSC quarter-final 4-3 (siskins); Won CSC semi-final 4-1 (Jr.Kings); Lost CSC Final 0-4 (Peach Kings) |
| 2004-05 | 40 | 30 | 4 | 4 | 2 | 193 | 101 | 66 | 1st WJCHL | Won semi-final 4-0 (Sailors); Won league 4-3 (Bulldogs); Won CSC quarter-final 4-2 (Shamrocks); Lost CSC semi-final 0-4 (73's) |
| 2005-06 | 40 | 32 | 5 | 2 | 1 | 237 | 97 | 67 | 1st WJCHL | Won semi-final 4-0 (W Hawks); Lost final 1-4 (Bulldogs) |
| 2006-07 | 40 | 29 | 8 | 0 | 3 | 204 | 135 | 61 | 2nd WJCHL | Lost semi-final 0-4 (W Hawks) |
| 2007-08 | 40 | 19 | 15 | - | 6 | 196 | 177 | 44 | 4th WJCHL | Won quarter-final 3-0 (Sailors); Lost semi-final 0-4 (Bulldogs) |
| 2008-09 | 36 | 19 | 15 | - | 2 | 141 | 115 | 40 | 4th WJCHL | Won quarter-final 3-2 (M Hawks); Lost semi-final 0-4 (W Hawks) |
| 2009-10 | 36 | 16 | 14 | - | 6 | 105 | 126 | 38 | 5th WJCHL | Lost quarter-final 0-3 (Bulldogs) |
| 2010-11 | 36 | 26 | 9 | - | 1 | 196 | 148 | 53 | 2nd WJCHL | Won quarter-final 3-0 (Sailors); Lost semi-final 1-4 (W Hawks) |
| 2011-12 | 36 | 19 | 13 | - | 4 | 152 | 119 | 42 | 4th WJCHL | Won quarter-final 4-1 (Bulldogs); Lost semi-final 1-4 (W Hawks) |
| 2012-13 | 36 | 22 | 14 | - | 0 | 194 | 142 | 44 | 4th WJCHL | Lost quarter-final 2-4 (Patriots) |
| 2013-14 | 35 | 26 | 6 | - | 3 | 184 | 125 | 55 | 1st WJCHL | Won semi-final 4-0 (Barons); Won League4-3 (W Hawks); Won CSC quarter-final 4-2 (Kings); Lost CSC semi-final 1-4 (73's) |
| 2014-15 | 36 | 29 | 7 | 0 | - | 171 | 94 | 58 | 1st WJCHL | Won, Semi - 4-2 (Bulldogs); Lost, League Final - 3-4 (W Hawks) |
| 2015-16 | 36 | 16 | 19 | 1 | - | 130 | 128 | 33 | 5th of 7 WJCHL | Lost quarters-final, 2-4 (M Hawks) |
| 2016-17 | 36 | 11 | 22 | 3 | - | 87 | 140 | 25 | 6th of 7 Pollock Div-PJHL | Lost Div Quarters, 0-4 (Patriots) |
| 2017-18 | 40 | 22 | 14 | 1 | 3 | 158 | 150 | 48 | 5th of 7 Pollock Div-PJHL | Won Div Quarters, 4-0 (M Hawks); Lost div semi-final, 0-4 (Patriots) |
| 2018-19 | 42 | 31 | 8 | 2 | 1 | 202 | 119 | 65 | 2nd of 7 Pollock Div-PJHL | Won Div Quarters, 4-0 (Flyers); Won Div Semifinal, 4-0 (Bulldogs); Lost Div Final, 2-4 (Patriots) |
| 2019-20 | 42 | 28 | 9 | 0 | 3 | 171 | 107 | 61 | 2nd of 7 Pollock Div-PJHL | Won Div Quarters, 4-0 (W Hawks); Won Div Semifinal, 4-1 (Bulldogs) no decision Div Final, 1-1 (Patriots); Playoffs cancelled due to covid |
| 2020-21 | Season Lost due to COVID-19 pandemic | | | | | | | | | |
| 2021-22 | 32 | 16 | 14 | 1 | 1 | 90 | 77 | 34 | 5th of 7 Pollock Div-PJHL | Won Div Quarters, 4-2 (Bulldogs); Lost div semi-final, 0-4 (Barons) |
| 2022-23 | 42 | 26 | 13 | 2 | 1 | 146 | 109 | 55 | 4th of 7 Pollock Div-PJHL | Won Div Quarters, 4-0 (Bulldogs; Lost div semi-final, 0-4 (Patriots) |
| 2023-24 | 42 | 17 | 21 | 3 | 1 | 102 | 118 | 38 | 6th of 8 Pollock Div-PJHL | lost Div Quarters 3-4 (Bulldogs) |
| 2024-25 | 42 | 20 | 19 | 3 | 0 | 145 | 157 | 43 | 5th of 8 Pollock Div; 10th of 16 North Conf; 36th of 63-PJHL | Lost Div.quarterfinal, 1-4 (Bulldogs) |
| 2025-26 | 42 | 12 | 28 | 2 | 0 | 105 | 185 | 26 | 7th of 7 Pollock Div; 13th of 15 North Conf; 52nd of 61-PJHL | Lost Div.quarterfinal, 0-4 (Barons) |

(*) The 1999-00 Season was altered drastically due to the folding of the Lakeshore Pirates. As a disproportionate number of games had been played by each team against Lakeshore, all history of these games were erased.

- 1979-1981 & 1982-1996
- 1981-1982
- 1996-2004
- 2004–Present

== Clarence Schmalz Cup appearances ==
2004: Grimsby Peach Kings defeated Wingham Ironmen 4-games-to-none
