= Kincardine Bulldogs =

Canadian junior ice hockey team

- City: Kincardine, Ontario
- League: Provincial Junior Hockey League
- Conference: North
- Division: Pollock
- Founded: 1994
- Home arena: Davidson Centre Arena
- Colours: Blue, Red, and White
- General manager: Warren Beisel
- Head coach: Jeff Alcombrack

Previous franchise history
- 1975–86: Kincardine Kinucks
- 1994–present: Kincardine Bulldogs

The Kincardine Bulldogs are a Canadian Junior ice hockey team based in Kincardine, Ontario. They play in the Provincial Junior Hockey League which is an amalgamation of all former junior C leagues in Southern Ontario including the Bulldogs former Western Junior C Hockey League.

== History ==
From 1975 until 1986, the Kincardine Kinucks played in the Central Junior "C" and Grey-Bruce Junior "C" Hockey League. They won the league title in 1979. They made it all the way to the Clarence Schmalz Cup All-Ontario Final where they lost to the Bowmanville Eagles in a four-game sweep. The team folded in 1986.

In 1994, Kincardine came back to the Junior "C" loop, now called the Western Junior "C" Hockey League. After taking three seasons to find their niche in the league, the Bulldogs won the league championship five of the next six seasons. In 1998, the Bulldogs made it all the way to the All-Ontario Championship but lost out to the Glanbrook Rangers 4-games-to-1. The Bulldogs were 2006 and 2007 Western Junior "C" Champions.

In 2004-05, the Bulldogs finished the regular season in second place. Their semi-final match up was against the third seeded Hanover Barons. The Bulldogs defeated the Barons 4-games-to-1. In the league final, the Bulldogs were up against the first seeded Wingham Ironmen. The Ironmen defeated the Bulldogs 4-games-to-3 to win the Western Junior C championship.

The 2005-06 season saw the Bulldogs finish off second in the regular season standings and have a bye through the league quarter-finals. In the semi-final, the Bulldogs locked horns with the third seeded Hanover Barons. The Barons did not prove much of a challenge as the Bulldogs walked through them 4-games-to-none. In the final, the Bulldogs were up against the first seeded Wingham Ironmen. The Bulldogs, despite being the lower seed managed to knock off the Ironmen in 5 games, 4-games-to-1, to win the league and enter into the All-Ontario playdowns for the Clarence Schmalz Cup. In the All-Ontario quarter-final, the Bulldogs ran into the Georgian Mid-Ontario Junior C Hockey League's Penetang Kings. Despite a valiant effort by the Bulldogs, the Kings ended their season 4-games-to-2.

The 2006-07 regular season ended with the Bulldogs atop the Western Junior C standings. With a bye in the quarter-finals, the Bulldogs faced a Hanover Barons squad just fresh off of eliminating the Mount Forest Patriots. The Bulldogs kept it quick and beat the Barons 4-games-to-1. In the final, the Bulldogs met the Walkerton Hawks. The Hawks had just finished their best season in years, and were looking for more. The Bulldogs curtailed the Hawks and beat them 4-games-to-1 for a second straight league title. In the All-Ontario playdowns, the Bulldogs again locked horns with the Georgian Mid-Ontario Junior C Hockey League's Penetang Kings. Everything seemed in hand for the Bulldogs, who by game four were leading the series 3-games-to-1. To the Bulldogs' dismay, the Kings roared back and won three straight to win the series 4-games-to-3.

During the summer of 2016 the eight junior "C" leagues in Southern Ontario came together as the Provincial Junior Hockey League. The former leagues became divisions and assigned to one of four conferences. For the Bulldogs it means they will compete in the Western Conference and the Pollock Division.

== Season-by-season standings ==
Season	GP	W	L	T	OTL	GF	GA	P	Results	Playoffs
1975-76	31	9	20	2	-	156	227	20	4th CJCHL	
1976-77	36	19	16	1	-	258	235	39	4th CJCHL	
1977-78	35	4	27	4	-	91	178	12	6th CJCHL	
1978-79	30	21	5	4	-	224	149	46	1st CJCHL	Won league, lost CSC final
1979-80	29	12	14	3	-	154	152	27	5th CJCHL	
1980-81	29	9	15	5	-	149	172	23	5th GBJCHL	
1981-82	30	23	6	1	-	208	129	47	1st GBJCHL	
1982-83	29	25	3	1	-	202	98	51	1st GBJCHL	
1983-84	30	16	11	3	-	174	156	35	3rd GBJCHL	
1984-85	30	6	19	5	-	140	163	17	6th GBJCHL	
1985-86	30	12	16	2	-	152	184	26	4th GBJCHL	
1986-94	Did not participate									
1994-95	30	3	26	1	-	81	189	7	7th WJCHL	
1995-96	29	17	10	2	-	140	107	36	3rd WJCHL	
1996-97	28	21	3	4	-	169	100	46	1st WJCHL	Won League; Won CSC quarter-final (Cubs); Lost CSC semi-final 2-4 (Canadiens)
1997-98	35	28	5	2	-	199	99	58	1st WJCHL	Won League; Won CSC quarter-final (Bulls); Won CSC semi-final 4-2 (73's); Lost CSC final 1-4 (Rangers)
1998-99	36	30	3	3	-	220	74	63	1st WJCHL	Won semi-final 4-0 (Wolves); Won League 4-3 (Ironmen); Won CSC quarter-final 4-3 (Devils); Lost CSC semi-final 1-4 (Lakers)
1999-00*	34	30	1	3	-	191	73	63	1st WJCHL	Won semi-final 4-1 (Hawks); Won League 4-1 (Ironmen); Won CSC quarter-final 4-3 (Devils); Lost CSC semi-final 0-4 (Canadiens)
2000-01	39	30	6	3	-	224	81	63	2nd WJCHL	Won semi-final 4-0 (Patriots); Lost final 1-4 (Barons)
2001-02	35	27	7	1	-	183	106	55	1st WJCHL	Won semi-final 4-1 (Patriots); Won League 4-1 (Barons); Won CSC quarter-final 4-0 (Siskins); Lost CSC semi-final 1-4 (Bruins)
2002-03	35	24	8	-	3	175	100	51	1st WJCHL	Won semi-final 4-3 (Ironmen); Lost final 1-4 (Barons)
2003-04	33	21	5	6	1	138	81	49	2nd WJCHL	Won semi-final 4-0 (Barons); Lost final 1-4 (Ironmen)
2004-05	40	25	14	1	0	151	114	51	2nd WJCHL	Won semi-final (Barons); Lost final 3-4 (Ironmen)
2005-06	40	32	6	2	0	193	90	66	2nd WJCHL	Won semi-final 4-0 (Barons); Won League 4-1 (Ironmen) lost CSC quarter-final 2-4 (Kings)
2006-07	39	32	5	0	2	246	103	66	1st WJCHL	Won semi-final 4-1 (Barons); Won League 4-1 (Ironmen) lost CSC quarter-final 3-4 (Kings)
2007-08	40	36	3	-	1	240	93	73	1st WJCHL	Won semi-final 3-0 (Ironmen); Lost semi-final 2-4 (Hawks)
2008-09	36	26	8	-	2	203	97	54	2nd WJCHL	Won quarter-final 3-0 (Patriots); Lost semi-final 0-4 (Barons)
2009-10	36	20	13	-	3	112	102	43	4th WJCHL	Won quarter-final 3-0 (Ironmen); Lost semi-final 3-4 (Hawks)
2010-11	36	18	16	-	2	148	150	38	4th WJCHL	Lost quarter-final 1-3 (Barons)
2011-12	36	18	15	-	3	114	126	39	5th WJCHL	Lost quarter-final 1-4 (Ironmen)
2012-13	36	25	10	-	1	176	125	51	2nd WJCHL	Won semi-final 4-0 (Hawks); Lost final 0-4 (Hawks)
2013-14	35	17	16	-	2	146	138	36	4th WJCHL	Won quarter-final 4-1 (Hawks); Lost semi-final 2-4 (Hawks)
2014-15	36	18	15	3	-	124	113	39	4th WJCHL	Won quarter-final 4-2 (Patriots); Lost semi-final 1-4 (Ironmen)
2015-16	36	22	13	1	-	179	135	45	3rd of 7 WJCHL	Won quarter-final 4-0 (Flyers); Won semi-final 4-3 (Patriots); Won League 4-3 (Hawks); Lost CSC quarter-final 1-4 (Alliston)
2016-17	36	16	17	3	-	118	125	35	4th of 7 Pollock Div-PJHL	Lost quarter-final 2-4 - (Barons)
2017-18	40	23	12	3	2	137	103	51	3rd of 7 Pollock Div-PJHL	Won quarter-final 4-0 (Flyers); Lost semi-final 2-4 (Hawks)
2018-19	42	23	16	1	2	153	133	49	3rd of 7 Pollock Div-PJHL	Won quarter-final 4-2 (Hawks); Lost semi-final 1-4 (Hawks)
2019-20	42	24	15	2	3	146	119	51	3rd of 7 Pollock Div-PJHL	Won quarter-final 4-2 (Flyers); Lost semi-final 0-4 (Ironmen)
2020-21	Season Lost due to COVID-19 pandemic									
2021-22	32	16	13	2	1	99	92	35	4th of 7 Pollock Div-PJHL	Lost quarter-final 2-4 (Ironmen)
2022-23	42	18	18	5	1	156	148	42	5th of 7 Pollock Div-PJHL	Lost quarter-final 0-4 (Ironmen)
2023-24	42	23	12	2	5	143	123	53	3rd of 8 Pollock Div-PJHL	Won quarter-final 4-3 (Ironmen); Lost Div. semi-final 1-4 (Patriots)
2024-25	41	22	16	3	0	148	160	47	4th of 8 Pollock Div; 7th of 16 North Conference; 31st of 63 - PJHL	Won quarter-final 4-3 (Ironmen); Lost semi-final 0-4 (Barons)
2025-26	42	18	21	2	1	144	195	39	4th of 7 Pollock Div; 8th of 15 North Conference; 38th of 61 - PJHL	Lost quarter-final 0-4 (Barons)

(*) The 1999–00 Season was altered drastically due to the folding of the Lakeshore Pirates. As a disproportionate number of games had been played by each team against Lakeshore, all history of these games were erased.

- 1974–81, 1982–86, & 1994–96
- 1981–82
- 1996–2004
- 2004–present

== Clarence Schmalz Cup appearances ==
1979: Bowmanville Eagles defeated Kincardine Kinucks 4-games-to-none
1998: Glanbrook Rangers defeated Kincardine Bulldogs 4-games-to-1
