= Mitchell Hawks =

Canadian junior ice hockey team

- City: Mitchell, Ontario
- League: Provincial Junior Hockey League
- Conference: North
- Division: Pollock
- Founded: 1966
- Home arena: Mitchell & District Arena
- Colours: Black, Red, and White
- President: Cory Broughton
- General manager: Cory Broughton
- Head coach: Daryl O’Connell (2024)
- Website: www.mitchellhawks.com

The Mitchell Hawks are a Junior ice hockey team based in Mitchell, Ontario, Canada. They play in the Provincial Junior Hockey League of the Ontario Hockey Association.

== History ==
The Mitchell Hawks were founded in 1966 in one of the many Ontario Hockey Association Junior C leagues. They finished low in the standings and were allowed to compete in the Junior D provincial championships. In the Junior D play downs, the Hawks found their niche and made it all the way to the OHA Cup final against a representative from Madoc, Ontario. The Hawks came up short and lost the series 4-games-to-1.

The following season, the same scenario played out in the Western Junior C league and the Hawks were entered into the Junior D playoffs. The Hawks again made it to the final and defeated a representative from Bobcaygeon, Ontario, 4-games-to-none with one tie to win their first provincial championship in only their second season. After the playoffs concluded, the Hawks dropped down to the Western Ontario Junior D Hockey League.

In 1974, the Hawks won the Western Junior D championship and challenged deep into the OHA championships. Upon reaching the OHA Cup final, they met the South-Central Junior D Hockey League champion Bradford Vasey Juniors. The Vasey Juniors defeated the Hawks 4-games-to-1 to win the provincial championship.

The Hawks fell on hard times in the 1980s and were forced to sit out the 1983–84 season. In 1988, all of Ontario's Junior D was consolidated into one "super league" and in 1991 the league was renamed the OHA Junior Development League.

In 1993, the Hawks came back to prominence and made it all the way to the league final. In the final, the Hawks challenged the Thamesford Trojans and defeated them by 4-games-to-1 to win their second OHA Cup.

The next season, the Hawks finished second overall in league standings with 35 wins and only 3 losses. They battled through the playoffs and met the first place Port Stanley Lakers in the finals. The Hawks defeated the Lakers 4-games-to-none to win their third OHA Cup and second straight OHAJDL championship.

The Mitchell Hawks finished the 2005–06 season first in their conference and fourth overall in the OHAJDL with 23 wins and 9 losses. They entered the conference quarter-final against the eighth seeded West Lorne Lakers. The Lakers created a massive upset and defeated the Hawks 4-games-to-2. The upset helped clear the way for the seventh seeded Lucan Irish to eventually win the title.

In 2006, the OHAJDL disbanded and the Southern Ontario Junior Hockey League was formed. The Hawks finished their first season in the SOJHL in fifth place overall with 26 wins and 12 losses. In the first round of the playoffs, the Hawks drew the Central Elgin Express. The Hawks defeated the Express 4-games-to-none. In the second round, the Hawks came up against the Lambeth Lancers who they promptly swept 4-games-to-none as well. In the conference final, the Hawks found themselves playing the Thamesford Trojans. The Hawks ended up defeating the Trojans 4-games-to-2 to earn a berth to the SOJHL final. Their opponents in the SOJHL final was the Delhi Travellers. The Hawks ended up defeating the Travellers 4-games-to-2 to win their fourth ever OHA Cup and the first ever SOJHL championship.

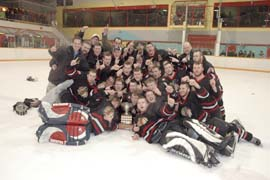
2006-07 SOJHL Champions

On May 29, 2008, Mitchell was granted expansion into the Western Ontario Junior C Hockey League. On September 19, the Hawks played their first modern Western Junior C game. They were defeated on the road by the Kincardine Bulldogs 8–2. The following night, the Hawks made their home debut and defeated the defending league champion Walkerton Hawks 3–1.

During the summer of 2016 the eight junior "C" leagues in Southern Ontario came together as the Provincial Junior Hockey League. The former leagues became divisions and assigned to one of four conferences. For the Hawks it means they will play in the Western Conference and the Pollock Division.

== Season-by-season standings ==
Season	GP	W	L	T	OTL	GF	GA	P	Results	Playoffs
1969-70	30	6	21	3	-	119	185	15	6th WJDHL	
1970-71	34	16	17	1	-	164	167	33	6th WJDHL	
1971-72	30	17	12	1	-	211	186	35	3rd WJDHL	
1972-73	32	18	10	4	-	195	144	40	2nd WJDHL	
1973-74	34	19	13	2	-	186	150	40	3rd WJDHL	Won League
1974-75	32	14	14	4	-	135	143	32	6th WJDHL	
1975-76	27	13	13	1	-	134	115	27	6th WJDHL	
1976-77	32	21	7	4	-	184	113	46	2nd WJDHL	
1977-78	34	22	6	6	-	200	129	50	2nd WJDHL	
1978-79	34	26	4	4	-	208	110	56	1st WJDHL	
1979-80	34	26	6	2	-	228	121	54	2nd WJDHL	
1980-81	34	20	10	4	-	156	129	44	3rd WJDHL	
1981-82	40	18	17	5	-	187	186	41	7th WJDHL	
1982-83	38	10	26	2	-	132	232	22	9th WJDHL	
1983-84	Did Not Participate									
1984-85	34	1	32	1	-	120	286	3	10th WJDHL	
1985-86	41	10	28	3	-	161	263	23	9th WJDHL	
1986-87	40	17	17	6	-	221	216	40	6th WJDHL	
1987-88	36	10	23	3	-	165	213	23	9th WJDHL	
1988-89	36	16	13	7	-	194	178	39	12th WJDHL	
1989-90	35	20	10	5	-	196	155	45	6th WJDHL	
1990-91	39	14	18	4	3	126	147	35	13th WJDHL	
1991-92	40	27	7	4	2	198	130	60	1st OHAJDL	
1992-93	40	32	6	1	1	211	122	66	3rd OHAJDL	Won League
1993-94	40	35	3	2	-	228	103	72	2nd OHAJDL	Won League
1994-95	39	15	23	1	0	142	166	31	14th OHAJDL	
1995-96	37	14	17	5	1	146	161	34	13th OHAJDL	
1996-97	37	18	14	4	1	128	110	41	10th OHAJDL	
1997-98	40	21	17	2	0	149	151	44	9th OHAJDL	
1998-99	40	24	12	1	3	146	112	52	4th OHAJDL	
1999-00	40	17	18	4	1	138	162	39	9th OHAJDL	Won Div. semi-final 4-2 (Hawks); Lost Div. final 2-4 (Irish)
2000-01	40	16	22	2	0	--	--	34	12th OHAJDL	Lost Div. semi-final 1-4 (Trojans)
2001-02	40	14	21	4	1	147	174	33	14th OHAJDL	Lost Div. semi-final 3-4 (Irish)
2002-03	40	13	24	2	1	146	215	29	17th OHAJDL	DNQ
2003-04	40	18	17	5	0	151	142	41	11th OHAJDL	Lost Div. semi-final 1-4 (Irish)
2004-05	39	21	14	4	0	138	121	46	9th OHAJDL	Won Div. semi-final 4-2 (Hawks); Lost Div. final 1-4 (Bulldogs)
2005-06	36	23	9	3	1	175	105	50	4th OHAJDL	Lost Conference quarter-final 2-4 (Lakers)
2006-07	40	26	12	0	2	198	152	54	5th SOJHL	Won Conference quarter-final 4-0 (Express); Won Conference semi-final 4-0 (Lancers); Won Conference final 4-2 (Trojans); Won OHA Cup 4-2 (Travellers)
2007-08	40	18	20	-	2	154	163	38	11th SOJHL	Lost Conference quarter-final 1-4 (Stars)
2008-09	36	19	15	-	2	154	136	40	5th WJCHL	Lost quarter-final 2-3 (Iroonmen)
2009-10	36	24	12	-	0	149	101	48	3rd WJCHL	Won quarters 3-2 (Patriots); Lost semi's 2-4 (Barons)
2010-11	36	19	13	-	4	148	141	42	3rd WJCHL	Won quarters 3-0 (Patriots); Won semi's 4-3 (Ironmen); Lost final 3-4 (Hawks)
2011-12	36	24	10	-	2	142	109	50	2nd WJCHL	quarters BYE; Won semi's 4-2 (Barons); Lost final 0-4 (Hawks)
2012-13	36	21	12	-	3	141	123	45	3rd WJCHL	Won quarters 4-2 (Barons); Lost semi's 0-4 (Bulldogs)
2013-14	35	14	17	-	4	119	148	32	5th WJCHL	Lost quarters 1-4 (Bulldogs)
2014-15	36	5	29	2	-	94	181	12	7th WJCHL	Lost quarters 1-4 (Hawks)
2015-16	36	17	19	0	-	128	134	45	4th of 7 WJCHL	Won quarters 4-2 (Ironmen); Lost semifinals 1-4 (Hawks)
2016-17	36	23	11	1	-	170	94	47	2nd of 7 Pollock Div-PJHL	Won Div Quarters 4-1 (Flyers); Lost div semi-finals 3-4 (Patriots)
2017-18	40	23	15	1	1	148	122	48	4th of 7 Pollock Div-PJHL	Lost Div Quarters 0-4 (Ironmen)
2018-19	42	12	25	2	3	134	197	29	6th of 7 Pollock Div-PJHL	Lost Div Quarters 2-4 (Bulldogs)
2019-20	42	21	14	2	5	165	153	49	5th of 7 Pollock Div-PJHL	Won Div Quarters 4-0 (Barons); Lost div. semi-finals 3-4 (Patriots)
2020-21	Season Lost due to COVID-19 pandemic									
2021-22	32	24	5	0	3	140	49	51	2nd of 7 Pollock Div-PJHL	Won Div Quarters 4-0 (Flyers); Won Div. Semi-finals 4-0 (Patriots); Won Div. Finals 4-3 (Barons); Lost Confer Finals 2-4 (Siskins)
2022-23	42	26	11	3	2	142	101	57	2nd of 7 Pollock Div-PJHL	Won Div Quarters 4-0 (Flyers); Lost div. semi-finals 1-4 (Barons)
2023-24	42	11	26	3	2	108	154	27	7th of 8 Pollock Div-PJHL	Lost Div Quarters 0-4 (Patriots)
2024-25	42	13	25	2	2	133	177	30	7th of 8 Pollock Div; 12th of 16 North Conf; 45th of 63-PJHL	Lost Div Quarters 1-4 (Whalers)
2025-26	42	12	25	3	2	128	194	29	6th of 7 Pollock Div; 12th of 15 North Conf; 50th of 61-PJHL	Lost Div Quarters 2-4 (Patriots)

=== Playoffs ===
- 1967 Lost OHA final

Madoc Juniors defeated Mitchell Hawks 4-games-to-1 in OHA final

- 1968 Won OHA Championship

Mitchell Hawks defeated Bobcaygeon Juniors 4-games-to-none with one tie in OHA final

- 1974 Won League, lost OHA final

Bradford Vasey Juniors defeated Mitchell Hawks 4-games-to-1 in OHA final

- 1993 Won League

Mitchell Hawks defeated Thamesford Trojans 4-games-to-1 in final

- 1994 Won League

Mitchell Hawks defeated Port Stanley Lakers 4-games-to-none in final

- 2006 Lost conference quarter-final

West Lorne Lakers defeated Mitchell Hawks 4-games-to-2 in conf. quarter-final

- 2007 Won League

Mitchell Hawks defeated Central Elgin Express 4-games-to-none in conf. quarter-final
Mitchell Hawks defeated Lambeth Lancers 4-games-to-none in conf. semi-final
Mitchell Hawks defeated Thamesford Trojans 4-games-to-2 in conf. final
Mitchell Hawks defeated Delhi Travellers 4-games-to-2 in final
