= Mount Forest Patriots =

Junior ice hockey team in Ontario, Canada

- City: Mount Forest, Ontario
- League: Provincial Junior Hockey League
- Conference: North
- Division: Pollock
- Founded: 1987
- Home arena: Mount Forest & District Sportsplex
- Colours: Black, Green, Yellow, and White
- General manager: Josh Keil
- Head coach: Tyler Crawford (2025)

The Mount Forest Patriots are a Junior ice hockey team based in Mount Forest, Ontario, Canada. They play in the Provincial Junior Hockey League (PJHL).

== History ==
With their expansion into the Ontario Hockey Association in 1987, the Patriots served as a catalyst for the genesis of the Grey-Bruce Junior "C" Hockey League (GBJHL) into the WJCHL. Until 1987, all teams in the GBJHL were from Grey County and Bruce County. Mount Forest, at the Southern border of Grey County, is actually a part of Wellington County and therefore rendered the GBJHL inadequate. The expansion of the Pats came soon after the folding of the Markdale Mohawks and the Arthur Eagles, two local Junior "D" teams.

Following nine years of WJCHL domination by the Hanover Barons, the Patriots came into their own. The team won three consecutive league titles from 1994 until 1996, but could not surpass the Belle River Canadiens (1994), Bowmanville Eagles (1995), or the Paris Mounties (1996) in the early rounds of the All-Ontario Championship to win the Clarence Schmalz Cup. In 1998, the Patriots were designated the farm team of the Ontario Provincial Junior A Hockey League's Durham Huskies. This relationship resulted in the Patriots fielding the first Russian to play in the WJCHL, Valentine Lidvanov, however the teams' affiliation was severed in 2001 when the Huskies left the OPJHL to join the WJCHL. The Huskies were granted leave from the OPJHL, but were voted out of the WJCHL before they could play a game.

The Pats have struggled to obtain their first winning season since 1998. Nonetheless, the arena is often filled at home games.

The 2004–05 season ended with the Mount Forest Patriots on the outside looking in. At the very end of the season, the upstart Goderich Sailors jumped ahead of the Patriots to take control of the fourth playoff seed and leaving the Patriots eliminated from the playoffs.

In 2005–06, the Patriots finished in last place overall but took advantage of an expanded playoff format introduced that season. The playoffs did not last long though as the Hanover Barons swept the Patriots in the league quarter-final 2-games-to-none.

The 2006–07 season ended with the Patriots back up in the fifth seed. They challenged the Hanover Barons in the league quarter-final and were defeated 3 games to 1.

During the summer of 2016 the eight junior "C" leagues in Southern Ontario came together as the Provincial Junior Hockey League. The former leagues became divisions and assigned to one of four conferences. The Patriots were assigned to the North Conference and the Pollock Division.

The Patriots have seen some success recently after the amalgamation of the Provincial Junior Hockey League. This success has been within their own division (Pollock) after winning the 2016-17 and 2017-18 division championships over the Walkerton Hawks. After defeating the Wingham Ironmen 4-0, they would see the 2nd-seeded Mitchell Hawks in the semi-finals for the Pollock Division. Though Mitchell was, on paper, the better team, and the Hawks jumped out to a quick 3-0 lead, the Patriots would fight back and win the series 4 games to 3. On the road in Game 7, the Patriots took the game 5-2 for their first upset in the Pollock division that year. The second upset was when the Patriots defeated the Walkerton Hawks 4 games to 3 in the division final to win their first league championship in 20 years. After their division win they would face the renowned Alliston Hornets. The Hornets would end up handling the series fairly easily, 4 games to 1.

The Patriots 2017–2018 season was one for the team's history books. After finishing first with a league record of 31-7-2 and one of the most successful seasons in Patriots history, they received a first-round bye. The second round saw them matched up against a familiar adversary: the Wingham Ironmen. The previous year, the Patriots had swept the Ironmen in the quarter-finals. Though the round initially looked to be close, the Patriots took the series 4-0. The Patriots were once again matched against the Walkerton Hawks in the division final. This series was in the Patriots' favor for the second year in a row, with Mount Forest winning their second division title in as many years, 4-2. After their 2nd division win in 2 years, the Patriots faced the newly acclaimed Carruthers Division champions Stayner Siskins. The Siskins won a closely matched series 4-1, before going on to lose to Schmalz Cup Champions the Lakefield Chiefs.

== Season-by-season standings ==
Season	GP	W	L	T	OTL	GF	GA	P	Results	Playoffs
1987-88	30	11	14	5	-	129	132	27	4th of 6 GBJCHL	
1988-89	30	12	13	5	-	149	148	29	4th of 6 WJCHL	Won quarter-final, 3-0 (Bears); Lost semi-final, 0-4 (Ironmen)
1989-90	30	13	15	2	-	156	180	28	4th of 6 WJCHL	Lost semi-final, 0-4 (Barons)
1990-91	30	8	18	4	-	110	126	20	6th of 7 WJCHL	
1991-92	29	9	16	4	-	121	142	22	5th of 7 WJCHL	
1992-93	29	9	17	3	-	138	170	21	5th of 7 WJCHL	
1993-94	32	22	6	4	-	--	--	48	1st of 5 WJCHL	Won League; Won CSC QF, 4-1 (Siskins); Lost CSC SF, 0-4 (Canadiens)
1994-95	29	21	3	5	-	102	74	47	1st of 7 WJCHL	Won League; Won CSC QF (Devils); Lost CSC SF, 3-4 (Eagles)
1995-96	30	22	6	2	-	179	95	46	2nd of 7 WJCHL	Won League; Won CSC QF, 4-1 (Siskins); Lost CSC SF, 0-4 (Raiders)
1996-97	30	15	10	5	-	158	141	35	3rd of 7 WJCHL	
1997-98	36	11	21	4	-	145	164	26	5th of 7 WJCHL	Won quarter-final (Ironmen); Lost semi-final (Barons)
1998-99	36	11	18	7	-	103	134	29	5th of 7 WJCHL	Lost quarter-final, 0-3 (Bulldogs)
1999-00*	34	8	22	4	-	91	157	20	5th of 7 WJCHL	DNQ
2000-01	39	19	17	3	-	152	149	41	3rd of 6 WJCHL	Won quarter-final, 3-1 (Wolves); Lost semi-final, 0-4 (Bulldogs)
2001-02	34	18	13	3	-	126	107	39	4th of 6 WJCHL	Won quarter-final, 3-0 (Walkerton Hawks); Lost semi-final, 1-4 (Bulldogs)
2002-03	35	10	24	-	1	92	168	21	5th of 6 WJCHL	Lost quarter-final, 0-3 (Ironmen)
2003-04	33	10	22	1	0	127	154	21	5th of 6 WJCHL	Won quarter-final, 3-2 (Walkerton Hawks); Lost semi-final, 0-4 (Ironmen)
2004-05	40	8	28	4	0	140	225	20	5th of 5 WJCHL	DNQ
2005-06	38	4	32	2	0	83	232	10	6th of 6 WJCHL	Lost quarter-final, 0-2 (Barons)
2006-07	40	6	32	0	2	126	244	14	5th of 6 WJCHL	Lost quarter-final, 1-3 (Barons)
2007-08	40	4	35	-	1	102	267	9	6th of 6 WJCHL	Lost quarter-final, 0-3 (Barons)
2008-09	36	1	34	-	1	70	265	3	7th of 7 WJCHL	Lost quarter-final, 0-3 (Bulldogs)
2009-10	36	7	27	-	2	98	173	16	6th of 7 WJCHL	Lost quarter-final, 2-3 (Mitchell Hawks)
2010-11	36	10	22	-	4	111	166	24	6th of 7 WJCHL	Lost quarter-final, 0-3 (Mitchell Hawks)
2011-12	36	14	21	-	1	130	156	29	6th of 7 WJCHL	Lost quarter-final, 0-4 (Barons)
2012-13	36	16	17	-	3	162	158	35	5th of 7 WJCHL	Won quarter-final, 4-2 (Ironmen); Lost semi-final, 3-4 (Walkerton Hawks)
2013-14	35	18	14	-	3	157	162	39	3rd of 7 WJCHL	Lost quarter-final, 3-4 (Barons)
2014-15	36	16	20	0	-	160	146	32	5th of 7 WJCHL	Lost quarter-final, 2-4 (Bulldogs)
2015-16	36	22	13	1	-	179	135	45	3rd of 7 WJCHL	Won quarter-final, 4-3 (Barons); Lost semi-finals, 3-4 (Bulldogs)
2016-17	36	17	17	2	-	126	118	36	3rd of 7 Pollock Div. PJHL	Won Div. QF, 4-0 (Ironmen); Won Div. SF, 4-3 (Mitchell Hawks); Won Div. Final, 4-3 (Walkerton Hawks); Lost Conf. Final, 1-4 (Hornets)
2017-18	40	31	7	2	-	199	104	64	1st of 7 Pollock Div. PJHL	Won Div. SF, 4-0 (Ironmen); Won Div. Final, 4-2 (Walkerton Hawks); Lost Conf. Final, 1-4 (Siskins)
2018-19	42	32	9	1	-	186	120	65	1st of 7 Pollock Div. PJHL	Won Div. SF, 4-0 (Walkerton Hawks); Won Div. Final, 4-2 (Ironmen); Lost North Conf., 2-4 (Hornets)
2019-20	42	33	7	1	1	214	109	68	1st of 7 Pollock Div. PJHL	Won Div. SF, 4-3 (M Hawks) n/d, 1-1 (Ironmen); Remaining playoffs cancelled - covid
2020-21	Season Lost due to COVID-19 pandemic									
2021-22	32	18	11	2	1	115	111	39	3rd of 7 Pollock Div. PJHL	Won Div. QF, 4-0 (W Hawks); Lost Div. SF,, 0-4 (M Hawks)
2022-23	42	32	9	0	1	201	130	65	1st of 7 Pollock Div. PJHL	Div. QF, bye Won Div. SF, 4-3 (Ironmen); Won Div. Finals, 4-3 (Barons); Lost North Conf, 2-4 (Siskins)
2023-24	42	32	7	3	0	183	108	67	2nd of 8 Pollock Div. PJHL	Won Div. QF, 4-0 (M Hawks); Won Div SF, 4-1 (Bulldogs); Lost Div Finals, 3-4 (Barons)
2024-25	42	32	7	3	0	183	108	67	2nd of 8 Pollock Div; 4th of 16 North Conf; 11th of 63 - PJHL	Won Div. QF 4-1 (Capitals); Lost Div SF 1-4 (Whalers)
2025-26	42	25	13	4	0	152	135	54	3rd of 8 Pollock Div; 6th of 15 North Conf; 23rd of 61 - PJHL	Won Div. QF 4-2 (M Hawks); Lost Div Semifinal 3-4 (Barons)

(*) The 1999-00 Season was altered drastically due to the folding of the Lakeshore Pirates. As a disproportionate number of games had been played by each team against Lakeshore, all history of these games were erased. If they had been included, the Patriots' record against the Pirates was 4-0-0.

- 1987–1996
- 1996–2004
- 2004–present
