= Sea shanty (disambiguation) =

A sea shanty is a genre of folk song.

Sea Shanty or Sea Shanties may also refer to:

- Sea Shanties (High Tide album), 1969
- Sea Shanties (Spiers and Boden album), 2002
- "Sea Shanty", a song by Quasi from Featuring "Birds" (1998)

== See also ==
- Sailor Song (disambiguation)
- Shanty (disambiguation)
