= Jeff Shevalier =

Canadian ice hockey player (born 1974)

- Born: March 14, 1974 (age 52) Mississauga, Ontario, Canada
- Height: 5 ft 11 in (180 cm)
- Weight: 180 lb (82 kg; 12 st 12 lb)
- Position: Left wing
- Shot: Left
- Played for: Los Angeles Kings; Tampa Bay Lightning; HC La Chaux-de-Fonds
- NHL draft: 111th overall, 1992; Los Angeles Kings
- Playing career: 1994–2003

Jeffrey Shevalier (born March 14, 1974) is a Canadian former professional ice hockey left winger. He played 32 games in the National Hockey League with the Los Angeles Kings and Tampa Bay Lightning between 1995 and 1999. The rest of his career, which lasted from 1994 to 2003, was mainly spent in the minor leagues.

== Biography ==
As a youth, Shevalier played in the 1988 Quebec International Pee-Wee Hockey Tournament with a minor ice hockey team from Erin, Ontario. He was drafted in the fifth round, 111th overall, in the 1992 NHL entry draft by the Los Angeles Kings. He played 32 games in the National Hockey League: 27 with the Kings and five with the Tampa Bay Lightning.

He currently sells real estate in Tempe, Arizona.

== Career statistics ==
=== Regular season and playoffs ===
			Regular season					Playoffs
Season	Team	League	GP	G	A	Pts	PIM	GP	G	A	Pts	PIM
1989–90	Acton Sabres	OHA-C	33	30	34	64	59	—	—	—	—	—
1990–91	Acton Sabres	OHA-C	28	29	31	60	62	—	—	—	—	—
1990–91	Georgetown Raiders	OHA-B	12	11	11	22	8	—	—	—	—	—
1990–91	Oakville Blades	OHA-B	5	1	4	5	0	—	—	—	—	—
1991–92	North Bay Centennials	OHL	64	28	29	57	26	21	5	11	16	25
1992–93	North Bay Centennials	OHL	62	59	54	113	46	2	1	2	3	4
1993–94	North Bay Centennials	OHL	64	52	49	101	52	17	8	14	22	18
1993–94	North Bay Centennials	M-Cup	—	—	—	—	—	1	0	0	0	2
1994–95	Los Angeles Kings	NHL	1	1	0	1	0	—	—	—	—	—
1994–95	Phoenix Roadrunners	IHL	68	31	39	70	44	9	5	4	9	0
1995–96	Phoenix Roadrunners	IHL	79	29	38	67	72	4	2	2	4	2
1996–97	Los Angeles Kings	NHL	26	4	9	13	6	—	—	—	—	—
1996–97	Phoenix Roadrunners	IHL	46	16	21	37	26	—	—	—	—	—
1997–98	Springfield Falcons	AHL	66	23	30	53	38	4	1	1	2	0
1998–99	Cincinnati Cyclones	IHL	76	29	34	63	57	3	1	1	2	0
1999–00	Tampa Bay Lightning	NHL	5	0	0	0	2	—	—	—	—	—
1999–00	Quebec Citadelles	AHL	5	0	2	2	2	—	—	—	—	—
1999–00	Detroit Vipers	IHL	46	11	25	36	42	—	—	—	—	—
1999–00	Grand Rapids Griffins	IHL	2	0	0	0	0	—	—	—	—	—
2000–01	Phoenix Mustangs	WCHL	36	33	33	66	58	—	—	—	—	—
2000–01	Utah Grizzlies	IHL	8	5	3	8	2	—	—	—	—	—
2000–01	Chaux-de-Fonds HC	NLA	5	1	3	4	6	5	4	3	7	6
2000–01	Idaho Steelheads	WCHL	—	—	—	—	—	12	9	12	21	22
2001–02	Idaho Steelheads	WCHL	42	24	32	56	26	—	—	—	—	—
2002–03	Idaho Steelheads	WCHL	17	5	11	16	10	—	—	—	—	—
IHL totals			325	121	160	281	243	16	8	7	15	2
NHL totals			32	5	9	14	8	—	—	—	—	—
