= Trisan Centre =

Recreation centre in Schomberg, Ontario, Canada

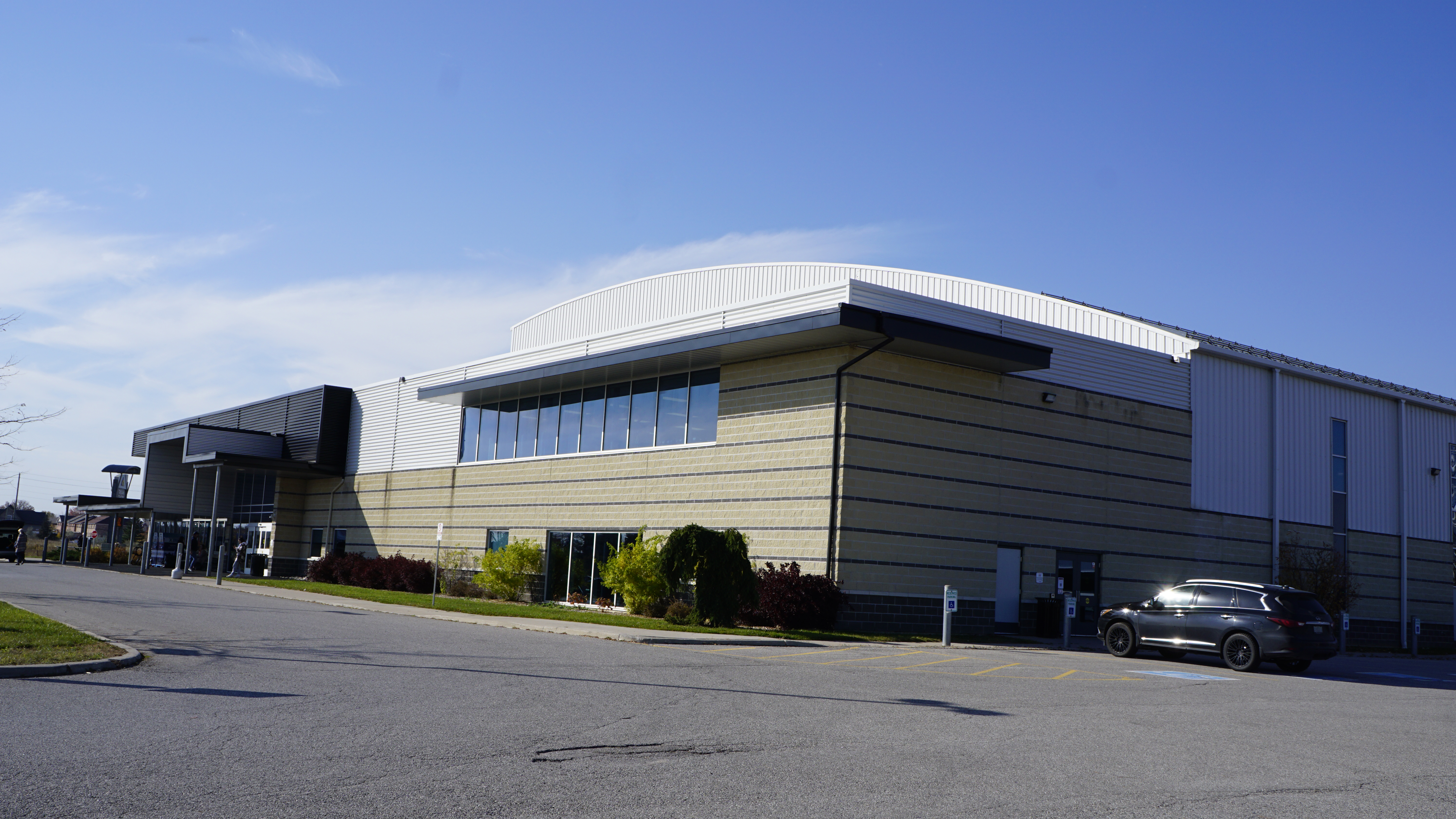
- Interactive map of Trisan Centre
- Location: Schomberg, Ontario, Canada
- Coordinates: 44°00′20″N 79°40′34″W
- Owner: Township of King
- Capacity: 600 - Hockey
- Surface: 200' X 85'

Construction
- Opened: April 29, 2011
- Cost: $14.6 million (est)
- Architect: Brisbin Brook Beynon Architects (BBB Architects)

Tenants
- Schomberg Minor Hockey Association, 2011–present

The Trisan Centre is a community recreation centre in Schomberg, Ontario, Canada located at the intersection of Dillane Drive and York Regional Road 27. It has a fitness centre, and a 600-seat arena that is the home rink of the Schomberg Cougars, an ice hockey team of the Ontario Hockey Association, and the Schomberg Minor Hockey Association of the Simcoe Region Minor Hockey League. The King Curling Club also uses the arena.

Local construction company Trisan Construction purchased the naming rights to the arena for 50 years.

The building was inaugurated on June 27, 2011, by township mayor Steve Pellegrini, the township's six councillors (Bill Cober, Avia Eek, Peter Grandilli, Cleve Mortelliti, Linda Pabst, and Debbie Schaefer), York Regional Council chairman Bill Fisch, provincial representative Helena Jaczek, and federal representative Paul Calandra.

== Construction ==
Construction was done by Maple Reinders Construction Ltd, and the facility has been built in accordance with York's Leadership in Energy and Environmental Design (LEED) Silver standard. Sustainable design features include water-efficient landscaping that will reduce the need for water by 50 per cent; innovative wastewater technologies reducing potable water for sewage conveyance by 50 per cent by capturing rainwater to flush toilets; and a roof designed to keep the building cooler in warm weather. As well, about half of the construction waste was diverted from landfill.

The approximately CA$14.9 million cost of the building was funded by CA$4,720,000 by each of the municipal government of King, the provincial government of Ontario, and the federal government of Canada, and also received CA$700,000 from the regional government of York Region. The centre is also attempting to raise CA$400,000 from community businesses and residents.

== Features ==
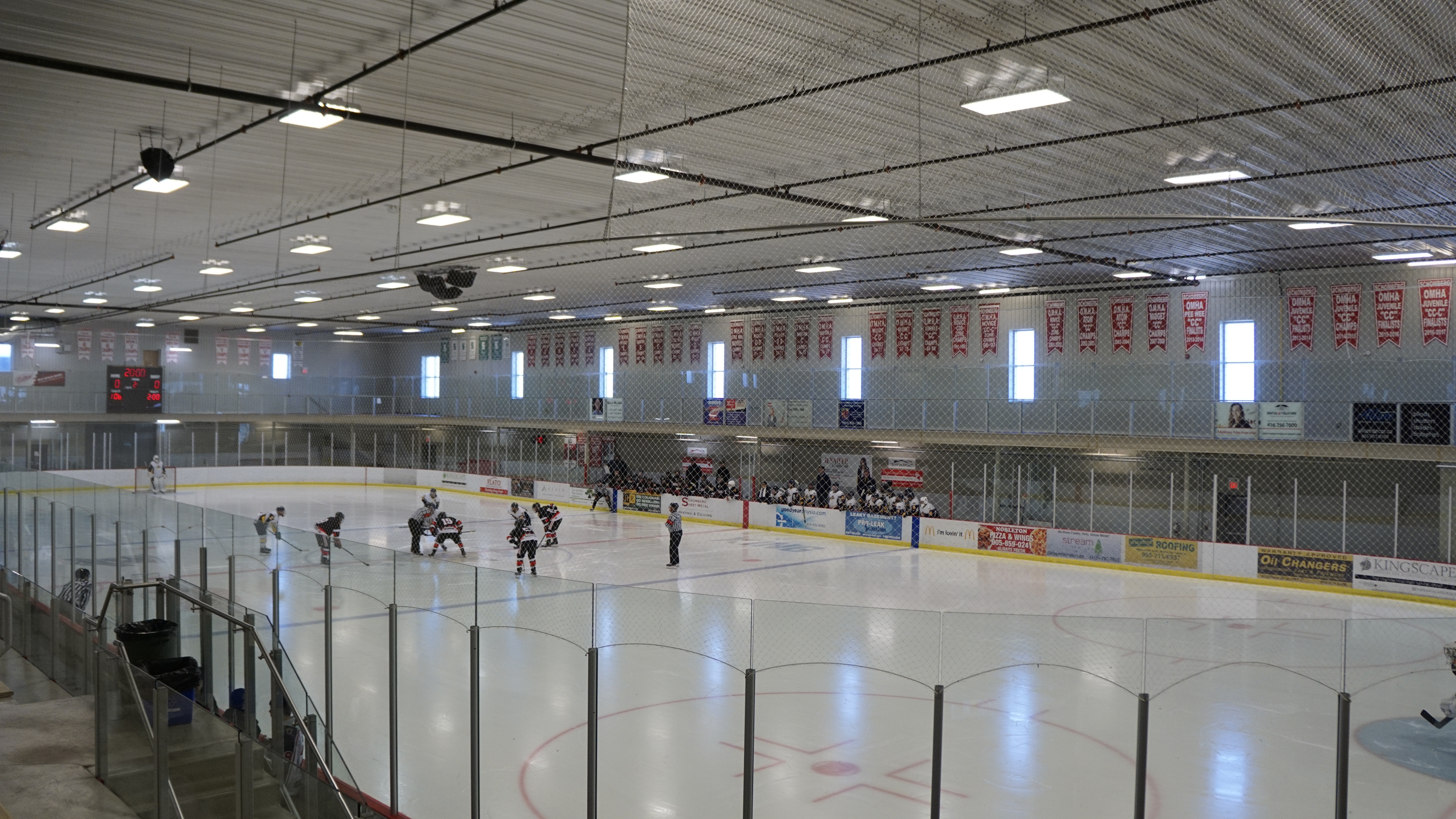
Interior

The facility features one NHL size ice pad with seating for approximately 600, and a four sheet curling facility. It also has a two-lane walking and running track, a fitness centre with strength training, spinning classes, aerobic studio, and cardio machines. Also included in the facility are a snack bar, pro shop, program rooms and meeting space. The regional government of York Region operates a two-bay paramedic response station from the centre. An EMS facility was included with the project, providing York Region with a new two-bay paramedic response station.

== Tenants ==
The King Curling Club meets at the Trisan Centre. Its predecessor organizations in Schomberg and Nobleton had previously curled on the ice hockey sheet of their community arena.

The Schomberg Cougars opened their inaugural season in the new Trisan Centre with a 6–2 win over the Fergus Devils on Thursday, September 15, 2011. The Cougars started the scoring with a shorthanded goal by Kyle Bishop. The 1st star of the game was Cougars' goaltender Charlie Vaccaro, who had 27 saves on the night.

The Toronto Marlies played two exhibition games in 2011 against the Syracuse Crunch, AHL affiliate of the Anaheim Ducks, in preparation for the American Hockey League’s 76th season. The Marlies hosted the Crunch on Sunday, October 2, 2011, at the Trisan Centre for the first of back-to-back games against their Eastern Conference opponent. The visiting Syracuse team defeated Toronto 4–1 in both teams' opening exhibition match. After the game the Marlies held a full-team autograph signing session for fans in attendance.
