= Sailor (surname) =

Sailor is a surname. Notable people with the surname include:

- Ryan Sailor (born 1998), American soccer player
- Walter Ronnie Sailor Jr. (born 1975), American former State Representative and convicted money launderer
- Wendell Sailor (born 1974), Australian rugby footballer
