= Hanover Barons =

Canadian junior ice hockey team

- City: Hanover, Ontario
- League: Provincial Junior Hockey League
- Conference: North
- Division: Pollock
- Founded: Circa 1964
- Home arena: P&H Centre
- Colours: Red, Yellow, and White
- General manager: Pete Irwin
- Head coach: Bobby Kirby

Franchise history
- 1964-1972: Hanover Hurricanes; 1972-Present: Hanover Barons

Championships
- League champions: 1971, 1985, 1986, 1987, 1988, 1989, 1990, 1991, 1992, 1993, 2001, 2003, 2024, 2025
- Clarence Schmalz Cups: 1991, 2025

The Hanover Barons are a junior ice hockey team based in Hanover, Ontario, Canada. They play out of the Provincial Junior Hockey League - Pollock Division. The Barons spent the 2009–10 season in the neighbouring town of Durham, Ontario while their new arena was being built in Hanover.

== History ==
The Hanover Hurricanes originated in the Western Junior C Hockey League in the mid-1960s. In 1968, they made the jump to the Western Junior D Hockey League, only to return not long after.

The Barons had no shortage of tough competition in the 1970s, in the 1976–77 season the Barons were completely winless as the Listowel Cyclones dominated the league and were champions that year. According to the Owen Sound Sun Times, on February 16, 1977, the Barons were defeated by the New Hamburg Hahns by a score of 34-0 and outshot 109 to 13.

In the 1980s, the league became the Grey-Bruce Junior "C" Hockey League. In 1984–85, the Barons came together and had a perfect season. With 28 wins in 30 games and 2 ties, the Barons went on to win their first league title since 1971. In 1985, the Barons took over the league and held them hostage for the next nine seasons. In 1988, the league became the Western Junior "C" Hockey League.

In 1989, the Barons made it to the All-Ontario Final and lost to the Bradford Bulls 4-games-to-2. In 1991, the Barons won their first Clarence Schmalz Cup as All-Ontario Champions, defeating the Orangeville Crushers 4-games-to-3. In 1993, the Barons made it to the Final again and lost out to the Napanee Raiders 4-games-to-2.

In recent years, the Wingham Ironmen and the Kincardine Bulldogs have held the top two positions in the league, while the Barons have placed below them.

In the 2004–05 regular season, the Barons finished in third place. In the playoff semi-final they drew the Kincardine Bulldogs who defeated them 4-games-to-1.

The 2005–06 season saw the Barons finish off in third place, they drew the sixth seeded Mount Forest Patriots in a best-of-3 series for the league quarter-final. The Barons finished off the Patriots 2-games-to-none. In the semi-final, the Barons found themselves against the second seeded Kincardine Bulldogs. The Barons were defeated 4-games-to-none by the eventual league champions.

In 2006–07, the Barons finished the regular season in fourth place as a late season surge by the Walkerton Hawks displaced them from their characteristic third seed. In a best-of-5 quarter-final, the Barons drew the Mount Forest Patriots and defeated them 3-games-to-1. In the semi-final, the Barons were put up against the top seeded Kincardine Bulldogs but lost the series 4-games-to-1.

For the 2009–10 season, the Barons played in neighbouring Durham, Ontario while awaiting the building of their new arena in Hanover.

== Season-by-season standings ==
Season	GP	W	L	T	OTL	GF	GA	P	Results	Playoffs
1964-65	30	7	23	0	-	110	195	14	10th CJCHL	
1965-66	32	18	11	3	-	164	145	39	4th CJCHL	
1966-67	24	12	9	3	-	141	107	27	3rd WJCHL	
1967-70	Statistics Not Available									
1970-71	32	21	9	2	-	--	--	44	2nd WJCHL	Won League, lost CSC SF
1971-72	Statistics Not Available									
1972-73	30	12	17	1	-	--	--	25	7th CJCHL	
1973-74	33	9	19	5	-	140	185	23	6th CJCHL	
1974-75	30	17	8	5	-	162	139	39	2nd CJCHL II	
1975-76	31	2	27	2	-	117	252	6	5th CJCHL II	
1976-77	36	0	35	1	-	70	529	1	7th CJCHL	
1977-78	34	7	26	1	-	114	255	15	5th CJCHL	
1978-79	30	5	22	3	-	112	199	13	7th CJCHL	
1979-80	28	8	18	2	-	121	168	18	6th CJCHL	
1980-81	30	9	17	4	-	157	209	22	7th GBJCHL	
1981-82	30	3	26	1	-	80	178	7	7th GBJCHL	
1982-83	30	14	14	2	-	130	134	30	3rd GBJCHL	
1983-84	30	15	12	3	-	168	138	34	4th GBJCHL	
1984-85	30	28	0	2	-	207	106	58	1st GBJCHL	Won League, lost CSC QF
1985-86	30	24	2	4	-	226	96	52	1st GBJCHL	Won League, lost CSC QF
1986-87	25	23	2	0	-	262	75	46	1st GBJCHL	Won League, lost CSC SF
1987-88	30	25	2	3	-	204	111	53	1st GBJCHL	Won League, lost CSC SF
1988-89	30	21	6	3	-	190	122	45	1st WJCHL	Won League, lost CSC Final
1989-90	30	22	6	2	-	209	100	46	1st WJCHL	Won League, lost CSC QF
1990-91	30	24	4	2	-	205	89	50	1st WJCHL	Won League; Won CSC Final; Schmalz Cup Champions (1st)
1991-92	30	25	2	3	-	202	71	53	1st WJCHL	Won League, lost CSC QF
1992-93	29	26	1	2	-	240	78	54	1st WJCHL	Won League, lost CSC Final
1993-94	32	13	12	7	-	--	--	33	3rd WJCHL	
1994-95	30	18	8	4	-	148	127	40	2nd WJCHL	
1995-96	30	22	5	3	-	163	113	47	1st WJCHL	
1996-97	29	14	9	6	-	142	116	34	4th WJCHL	
1997-98	36	20	14	2	-	164	113	42	3rd WJCHL	Won quarter-final (Blackhawks); Won semi-final (Patriots); Lost final (Bulldogs)
1998-99	36	22	11	3	-	152	94	47	3rd WJCHL	Lost quarter-final 2-3 (Blackhawks)
1999-00*	33	18	14	1	-	134	102	37	3rd WJCHL	Lost semi-final 3-4 (Ironmen)
2000-01	39	34	3	2	-	257	84	70	1st WJCHL	Won semi-final 4-0 (Hawks); Won League4-1 (Bulldogs); Won CSC quarter-final 4-1 (Devils); Lost CSC SF 0-4 (Canadiens)
2001-02	35	26	7	2	-	171	96	54	2nd WJCHL	Won semi-final 4-1 (Ironmen); Lost final 1-4 (Bulldogs)
2002-03	35	22	11	-	2	142	103	48	3rd WJCHL	Won quarter-final 3-0 (Wolves); Won semi-final 4-1 (Hawks); Won League 4-1 (Bulldogs); Won CSC quarter-final 4-0 (Cougars); Lost CSC SF 1-4 (Ice)
2003-04	34	16	16	2	0	112	124	34	3rd WJCHL	Won quarter-final 3-0 (Sailors); Lost semi-final 2-4 (Bulldogs)
2004-05	40	15	22	3	0	164	181	33	3rd WJCHL	Lost semi-final 1-4 (Bulldogs)
2005-06	39	17	15	4	3	163	148	41	3rd WJCHL	Won quarter-final 2-0 (Patriots); Lost semi-final 0-4 (Bulldogs)
2006-07	40	20	18	0	2	160	157	42	4th WJCHL	Won quarter-final 3-1 (Patriots); Lost semi-final 1-4 (Hawks)
2007-08	39	23	12	-	4	210	155	50	3rd WJCHL	Won quarter-final 3-0 (Patriots); Lost semi-final 0-4 (Hawks)
2008-09	36	23	11	-	2	178	116	48	3rd WJCHL	Won quarter-final 3-0 (Sailors); Won semi-final 4-2 (Bulldogs); Lost final 2-4 (Hawks)
2009-10	36	23	7	-	6	155	97	52	2nd WJCHL	Won quarter-final 3-0 (Sailors); Won semi-final 4-2 (Hawks); Lost final 3-4 (Hawks)
2010-11	36	17	16	-	3	178	165	37	5th WJCHL	Won quarter-final 3-1 (Bulldogs); Lost semi-final 2-4 (Hawks)
2011-12	36	21	10	-	5	148	128	47	3rd WJCHL	Won quarter-final 4-0 (Patriots); Lost semi-final 2-4 (Hawks)
2012-13	36	12	22	-	2	147	176	26	6th WJCHL	Lost quarter-final 2-4 (Hawks)
2013-14	35	7	25	-	3	105	194	17	6th WJCHL	Won quarter-final 4-3 (Patriots); Lost semi-final 0-4 (Ironmen)
2014-15	36	19	16	1	-	144	131	39	3rd WJCHL	Won quarter-final 4-0 - (Flyers); Lost semi-final 1-4 - (Hawks)
2015-16	36	14	22	0	-	138	143	28	6th of 7 WJCHL	Lost quarter-final 3-4 (Patriots)
2016-17	36	17	19	0	-	121	147	34	5th of 7 Pollock Div-PJHL	Won Div quarter-final 4-2 (Bulldogs); Lost div semi-final 0-4 (Hawks)
2017-18	40	6	31	3	-	77	190	15	7th of 7 Pollock Div-PJHL	Lost Div quarter-final 1-4 (Hawks)
2018-19	42	15	21	2	4	127	135	36	4th of 7 Pollock Div-PJHL	Lost Div quarter-final 2-4 (Hawks)
2019-20	42	23	16	1	2	156	135	49	4th of 7 Pollock Div-PJHL	Lost Div Quarter-final 0-4 (Hawks)
2020-21	Season Lost due to COVID-19 pandemic									
2021-22	32	25	4	2	1	154	60	53	1st of 7 Pollock Div-PJHL	Won Div semi-final 4-0 (Ironmen); Lost Div Final 3-4 (Hawks)
2022-23	42	26	12	2	2	151	105	56	3rd of 7 Pollock Div-PJHL	Won Div quarter-final 4-0 (Capitals); Won Div semi-final - 4-1 (Hawks); Lost division final 1-4 (Patriots)
2023-24	42	36	4	0	2	208	94	74	1st of 8 Pollock Div-PJHL	Won Div quarter-final 4-0 (Flyers); Won Div semi-final 4-2 (Whalers); Won Div. Final 4-3 (Patriots); Won North Conference Final 4-1 (Hornets); Lost CSC semi final 2-4 (Eagles)
2024-25	42	36	3	2	1	193	97	75	1st of 8 Pollock Div; 2nd of 16 North Conf; 3rd of 35 -PJHL	Won Div quarter-final 4-0 (Flyers); Won Div semi-final 4-0 (Capitals); Won Div. Final 4- 1 (Whalers); Won North Conference 4-1 (Terriers); Won CSC semi-final 4-3 (Raiders); Won CSC Final 4-0 (73's); Schmalz Cup Champions (2nd)
2025-26	42	33	7	1	1	200	81	68	2nd of 7 Pollock Div; 2nd of 15 North Conf; 5th of 61 -PJHL	Won Div quarter-final 4-0 (Ironmen); Won Div semi-final 4-3 (Patriots); Lost Div Finals 1-4 (Whalers)

(*) The 1999–00 Season was altered drastically due to the folding of the Lakeshore Pirates. As a disproportionate number of games had been played by each team against Lakeshore, all history of these games were erased.

- 1974–1981 & 1982–1996
- 1981–1982
- 1996–2004
- 2004–present

== Clarence Schmalz Cup appearances ==
1989: Bradford Bulls defeated Hanover Barons 4-games-to-2
1991: Hanover Barons defeated Orangeville Crushers 4-games-to-3
1993: Napanee Raiders defeated Hanover Barons 4-games-to-2
2025: Hanover Barons defeated Essex 73's 4-games-to-0

== Notable alumni ==
- Jeff MacMillan
- Jordan Willis
- Kevin Pollock (NHL referee)
- Rob Hellyer (NLL Player)
- Kyle Maloney (Professional poker player)
