= Saylor =

Saylor is a given name and a surname of English origin. It might have evolved from an occupational name referring to an acrobat that originated from a French word.

Notable people with this name include:

- Saylor Curda (born 2004), American actress
- Saylor O'Brien (born 2003), American para-alpine skier
- Saylor Poffenbarger (born 2003), American basketball player
- Bill Saylor (?–2020), American TV personality
- Bruce Saylor (born 1946), American composer
- John P. Saylor (1908–1973), American politician
- Lynn Carey Saylor, American musician
- Michael J. Saylor (born 1965), CEO of MicroStrategy
  - The Saylor Foundation, a free online university
- Morgan Saylor, American actress
- Steven Saylor, (born 1956), American author
- Connie Saylor, (1940–1993) American NASCAR driver from Johnson City Tennessee
- William A. Saylor (1843–1887) American politician, lawyer, military officer, businessman

== See also ==
- Sailer (disambiguation)
- Sailor (disambiguation)
- Saylor, Iowa
