= Clinton Radars (2026) =

Canadian Junior ice hockey team

- City: Clinton, Ontario
- League: Provincial Junior Hockey League
- Conference: North
- Division: Pollock
- Founded: 2003
- Home arena: Central Huron Community Complex
- Colours: Blue, Red, White, Grey
- General manager: Ryan Olmstead (2026)
- Head coach: Brandon Merritt (2026)

Franchise history
- 1985-1993: Goderich Sailors; 2003-2013 Goderich Sailors; 2014-2024 Goderich Flyers; 2026-present Clinton Radars

The Clinton Radars are members of the Provincial Junior Hockey Leagur (PHJL). They were previously the Goderich Flyers until the franchise moved and rebranded in 2026.

== History ==
After the failed and short-lived Lakeshore Pirates folded in 1999, the town of Goderich pushed for a new team. They were granted expansion in 2003 after the folding of the Wiarton Wolves. The team was named the Sailors after another Junior C team that had folded in 1993. The Sailors were granted a leave of absence for the 2013-14 season to try and re-organize. On April 17, 2014, the Ontario Hockey Association (OHA) advised the organizing committee under the direction of Doug Cruickshank that they were accepted back into the Western Ontario Junior C Hockey League for the 2014-15 season. In preparation for the new season the team announced a GM a new head coach, and a new name Goderich Flyers Jr. C Hockey Club.

In 2004-05, the Sailors squeezed into the fourth and final playoff spot. With an automatic berth to the Western league semi-final, the Sailors met up with the Wingham Ironmen. The Ironmen swept the Sailors 4-games-to-none.

The 2005-06 season ended with the Goderich Sailors in fourth place. In the playoff quarter-final, the Sailors drew the fifth seeded Walkerton Hawks for a best-of-3 series. The Hawks made quick work of the Sailors and won the series 2-games-to-none.

The 2006-07 season saw the Goderich Sailors end the years in last place, the sixth seed. In the Western league quarter-final they again drew the Walkerton Hawks, but this year in the best-of-5 series. The Hawks, who were coming off of a rather strong regular season, defeated the Sailors 3-games-to-1.

During the summer of 2016 the eight junior "C" leagues in Southern Ontario came together as the Provincial Junior Hockey League. The former leagues became divisions and assigned to one of four conferences. For the Flyers it means they will compete in the Western Conference and the Pollock Division.

Following the 2024-25 season the Goderich Flyers were granted a one-year leave of absence. However, during their leave of absence, the franchise moved to Clinton,Ontario and re-branded as the Clinton Radars.

== Season-by-season standings ==
Season	GP	W	L	T	OTL	GF	GA	P	Results	Playoffs
Goderich Sailors
1985-86	29	9	19	1	-	144	224	19	5th GBJCHL	
1986-87	25	1	20	4	-	86	219	6	5th GBJCHL	
1987-88	29	7	21	1	-	129	161	15	6th GBJCHL	
1988-89	30	4	22	4	-	108	197	12	6th WJCHL	
1989-90	30	13	13	4	-	163	177	30	3rd WJCHL	
1990-91	30	14	14	2	-	149	156	30	3rd WJCHL	
1991-92	27	1	24	2	-	59	220	2	7th WJCHL	
1992-93	29	3	24	2	-	127	269	8	7th WJCHL	
1993-03	Did Not Participate									
Goderich Sailors
2003-04	34	6	24	2	2	89	182	16	6th WJCHL	Lost quarter-final 0-3 (Barons)
2004-05	40	9	26	2	3	112	186	23	4th WJCHL	Lost semi-final 0-4 (Ironmen)
2005-06	38	14	22	2	0	125	175	32	4th WJCHL	Lost quarter-final 0-2 (Hawks)
2006-07	39	3	33	0	3	90	248	9	6th WJCHL	Lost quarter-final 1-3 (Hawks)
2007-08	39	9	29	-	1	100	239	19	5th WJCHL	Lost quarter-final 0-3 (Ironmen)
2008-09	36	6	30	-	0	83	233	12	6th WJCHL	Lost quarter-final 0-3 (Barons)
2009-10	36	5	28	-	3	79	179	13	7th WJCHL	Lost quarter-final 0-3 (Barons)
2010-11	35	4	31	-	0	90	240	8	7th WJCHL	Lost quarter-final 0-3 (Ironmen)
2011-12	36	2	33	-	1	68	206	5	7th WJCHL	Lost quarter-final 0-4 (Hawks)
2012-13	36	1	34	-	1	67	282	3	7th WJCHL	Lost quarter-final 0-4 (Hawks)
2013-14	Did Not Participate									
Goderich Flyers
2014-15	36	9	27	0	-	94	210	18	6th WJCHL	Lost quarter-final - 0-4 - (Barons)
2015-16	36	3	33	0	-	97	234	6	7th of 7 WJCHL	Lost Quarter-final - 0-4 - (Bulldogs)
2016-17	36	5	27	4	-	107	209	14	7th of 7 Pollock Div-PJHL	Lost Div Quarters - 1-4 (Hawks)
2017-18	40	7	29	4	-	117	209	18	6th of 7 Pollock Div-PJHL	Lost Div Quarters - 0-4 (Bulldogs)
2018-19	42	8	29	2	3	144	235	21	6th of 7 Pollock Div-PJHL	Lost Div Quarters - 1-4 (Ironmen)
2019-20	42	8	32	1	1	114	214	18	6th of 7 Pollock Div-PJHL	Lost Div Quarters - 1-4 (Bulldogs)
2020-21	Season Lost due to COVID-19 pandemic									
2021-22	32	3	28	1	0	64	190	7	7th of 7 Pollock Div-PJHL	Lost Div Quarters - 0-4 (Hawks)
2022-23	42	7	33	2	0	114	241	17	7th of 7 Pollock Div-PJHL	Lost Div Quarters - 0-4 (Hawks)
2023-24	42	3	35	2	2	66	224	10	8th of 8 Pollock Div-PJHL	Lost Div Quarters - 0-4 (Barons)
2024-25	41	6	31	1	3	98	198	16	8th of 8 Pollock Div; 15th of 16 North Conf; 58th of 63-PJHL	Lost Div Quarters - 0-4 (Barons)
2025-26	Requested one-year Leave of Absence									

- 1985–93
- 2003–04
- 2004–present
