= Kevin Czuczman =

Canadian ice hockey player (born 1991)

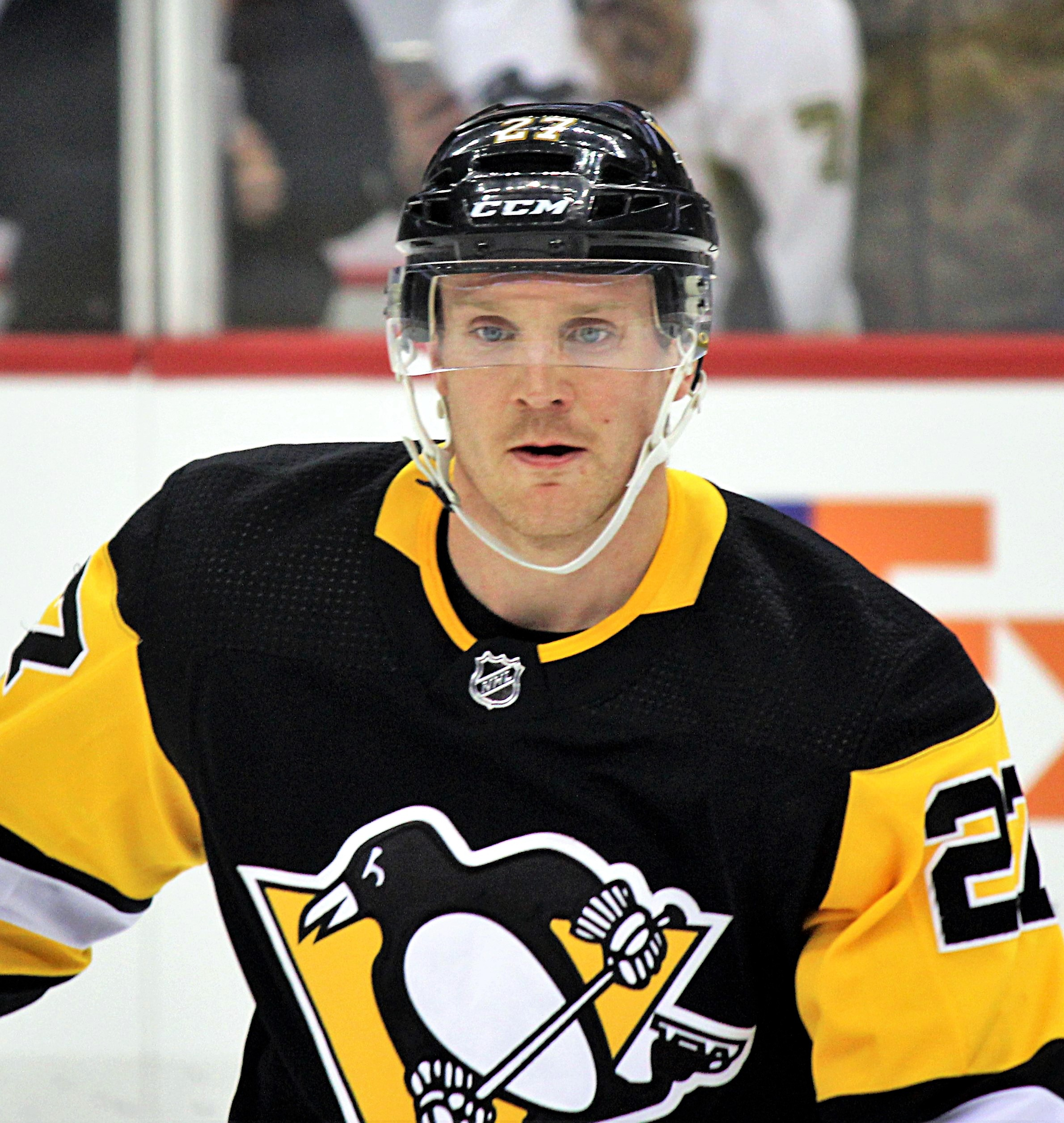
- Czuczman with the Pittsburgh Penguins in 2017
- Born: January 9, 1991 (age 35) London, Ontario, Canada
- Height: 6 ft 3 in (191 cm)
- Weight: 194 lb (88 kg; 13 st 12 lb)
- Position: Defence
- Shoots: Left
- ELH team Former teams: HC Litvínov; New York Islanders; Pittsburgh Penguins; Ilves
- NHL draft: Undrafted
- Playing career: 2014–present

Kevin Czuczman (/ˈtʃɜːrtʃmən/ CHURCH-man) (born January 9, 1991) is a Canadian professional ice hockey defenceman. He is currently playing with HC Litvínov in the Czech Extraliga (ELH).

== Playing career ==
Undrafted, Czuczman attended Lake Superior State University where he played three seasons with the Lake Superior State Lakers men's ice hockey team from 2011 to 2014. He scored his first collegiate goal on November 4, 2011 against Bemidji State. In 2013–14, Czuczman was named to the All-WCHA Second Team.

On March 11, 2014, the New York Islanders signed Czuczman as a free agent to a two-year, entry-level deal, and he made his NHL debut one week later, on March 18, 2014, playing just over 20 minutes in a 6–0 loss to the visiting Minnesota Wild.

At the conclusion of his entry-level contract with the Islanders following the 2015–16 season, Czuczman's rights were not retained by the Islanders, releasing him to free agency. He agreed to a one-year deal to continue in the AHL with the Manitoba Moose, an affiliate to the Winnipeg Jets during the free agency season. With the Moose, Czuczman established himself early to maintain a regular top four role on the blueline for the 2016–17 season. Improving his offensive output and becoming an alternate captain, Czuczman responded with his best professional season in compiling 9 goals and 32 points in 76 games.

On July 3, 2017, Czuczman back in the interest of NHL clubs, agreed to a one-year, two-way contract with the Pittsburgh Penguins. On June 25, 2018, Czuczman re-signed with Pittsburgh on a one-year, two-way contract. On June 26, 2019, Czuczman re-signed with Pittsburgh on two-year contract.

Leaving the Penguins after four seasons within the organization, Czuczman was signed by the Minnesota Wild to a one-year, two-way contract on July 29, 2021.

Having played exclusively in North America for the first nine seasons of his professional career, Czuczman signed his first contract abroad in agreeing to a one-year contract with Finnish club, Ilves of the Liiga, on June 23, 2022.

== Career statistics ==
			Regular season					Playoffs
Season	Team	League	GP	G	A	Pts	PIM	GP	G	A	Pts	PIM
2008–09	Listowel Cyclones	GOJHL	2	0	0	0	0	—	—	—	—	—
2009–10	Waterloo Siskins	GOJHL	51	2	23	25	84	10	1	1	2	15
2010–11	Newmarket Hurricanes	OJHL	47	4	19	23	40	10	1	3	4	13
2011–12	Lake Superior State U.	CCHA	40	2	11	13	26	—	—	—	—	—
2012–13	Lake Superior State U.	CCHA	38	2	9	11	42	—	—	—	—	—
2013–14	Lake Superior State U.	WCHA	36	10	11	21	73	—	—	—	—	—
2013–14	New York Islanders	NHL	13	0	2	2	14	—	—	—	—	—
2014–15	Bridgeport Sound Tigers	AHL	50	1	6	7	56	—	—	—	—	—
2014–15	Florida Everblades	ECHL	9	1	0	1	4	12	0	0	0	6
2015–16	Bridgeport Sound Tigers	AHL	74	4	11	15	95	3	0	0	0	0
2016–17	Manitoba Moose	AHL	76	9	23	32	48	—	—	—	—	—
2017–18	Wilkes-Barre/Scranton Penguins	AHL	71	4	31	35	48	2	0	0	0	2
2018–19	Wilkes-Barre/Scranton Penguins	AHL	65	4	17	21	60	—	—	—	—	—
2019–20	Wilkes-Barre/Scranton Penguins	AHL	38	2	8	10	16	—	—	—	—	—
2020–21	Pittsburgh Penguins	NHL	2	0	0	0	0	—	—	—	—	—
2020–21	Wilkes-Barre/Scranton Penguins	AHL	28	0	4	4	4	—	—	—	—	—
2021–22	Iowa Wild	AHL	48	2	8	10	17	—	—	—	—	—
2022–23	Ilves	Liiga	31	2	4	6	6	—	—	—	—	—
2023–24	HC Litvínov	ELH	52	0	7	7	32	13	0	1	1	2
NHL totals			15	0	2	2	14	—	—	—	—	—

== Awards and honors ==
Award	Year
College
All-WCHA Second Team	2013–14
