= Great Lakes Junior C Hockey League =

Junior league of the Ontario Hockey Association

Great Lakes Junior "C" Hockey League
Head Office	Cambridge, Ontario
Official Web site	GLJC
Director	John Kopinak
Convenors	Richard Allen, Gerry Mallen
Operated	1968-2016

The Great Lakes Junior C Hockey League was a Junior "C" ice hockey league in Ontario, Canada, sanctioned by the Ontario Hockey Association. The champion of the Great Lakes competed for the All-Ontario Championship and the Clarence Schmalz Cup. It is now a division in the Provincial Junior Hockey League.

The league got its start as the Border Cities Junior Hockey League in 1968. It became a Junior B and C league under the Great Lakes name in 1970 before strictly Junior C in 1974.

== History ==
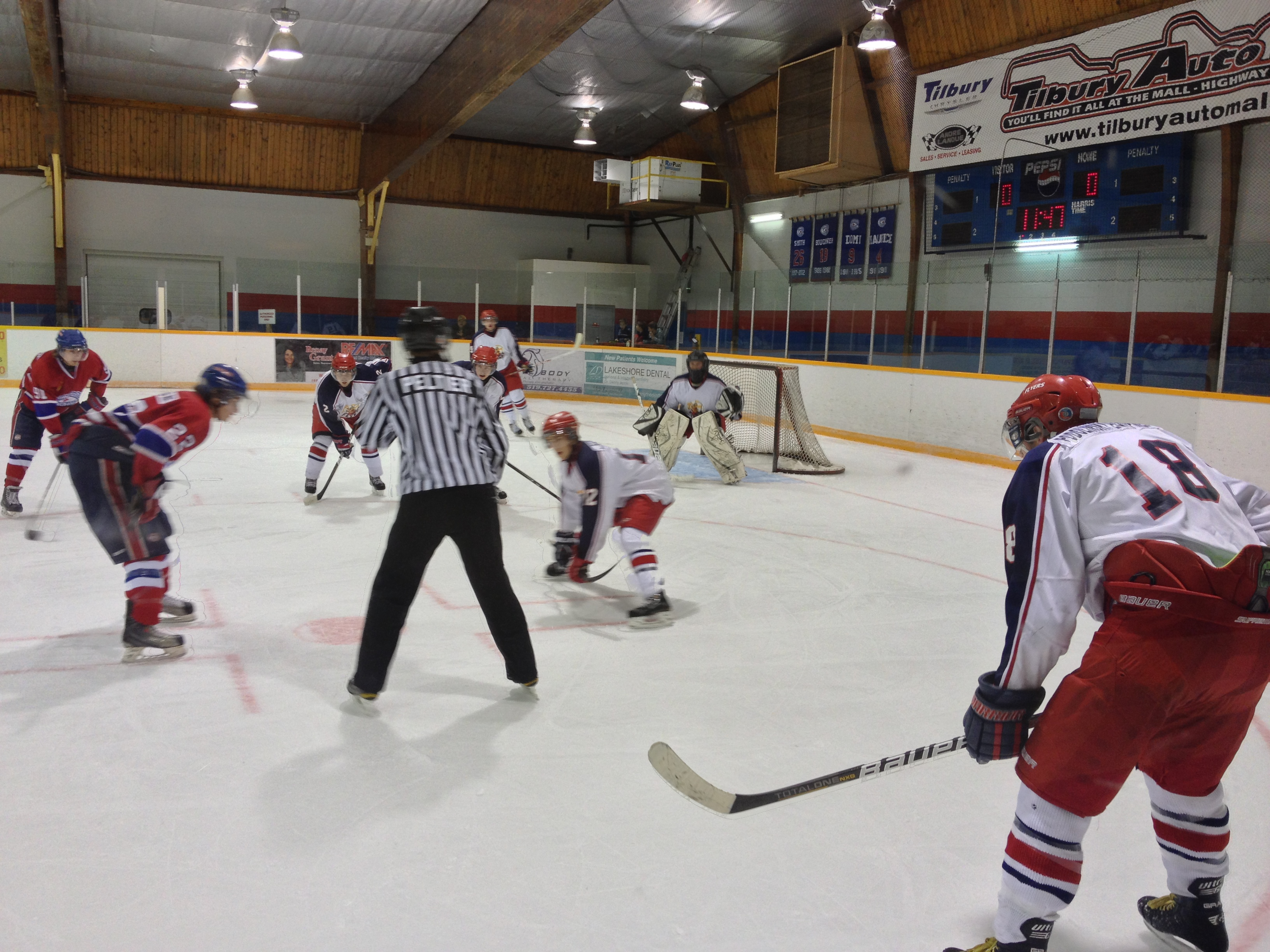
Alvinston Flyers lining up for a face-off in the defensive zone at the Belle River Canadiens' 2013 home opener.

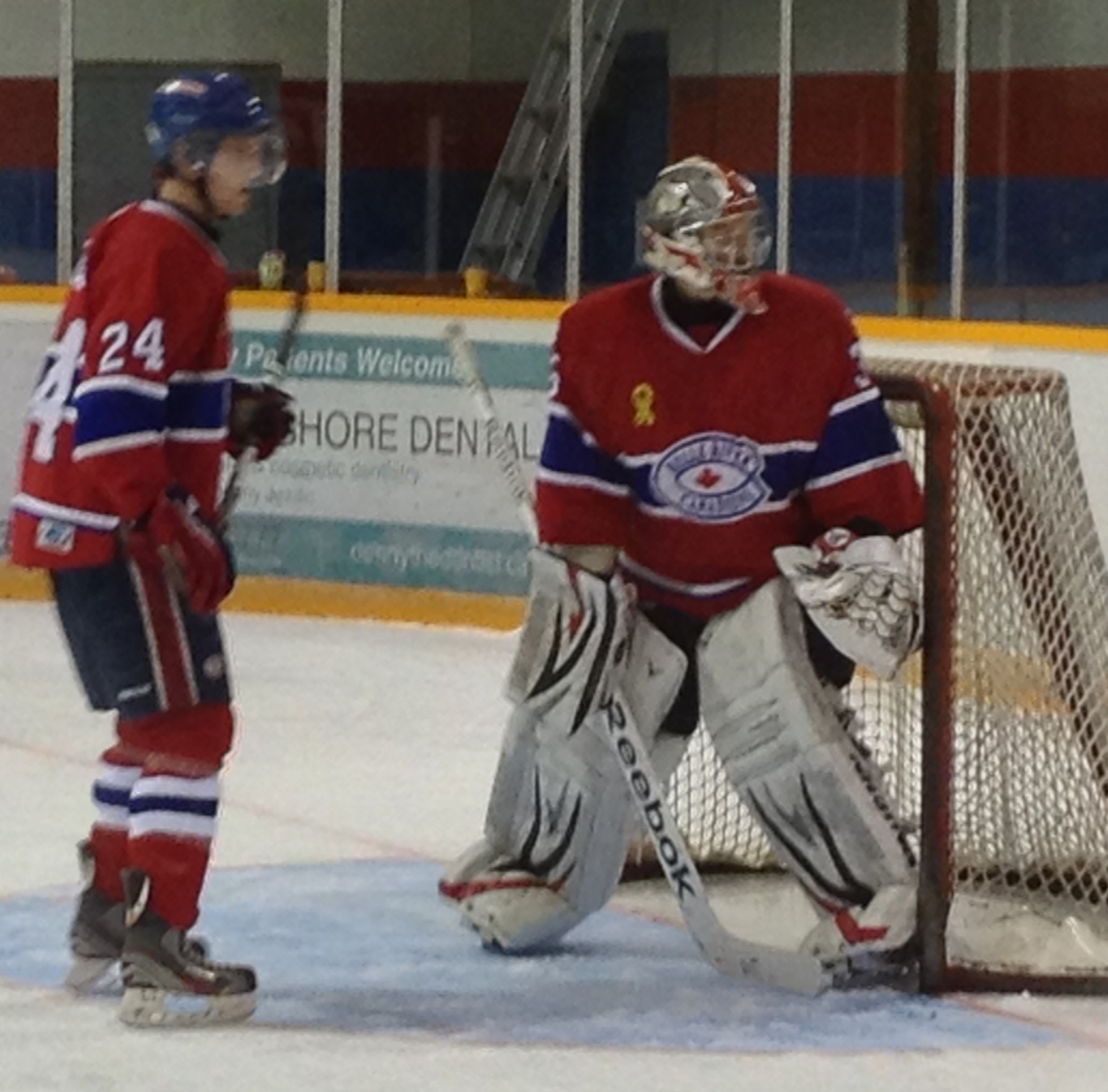
Belle River goalie watches puck behind his net during 2013-14 season.

=== Development ===
Out of the ashes of the old Bluewater Hockey League, a local league that sometimes operated at Junior D and Juvenile levels, came the Border Cities Junior Hockey League in 1968. In 1968-69, the league operated on both sides of the Canada-United States border. The Leamington Flyers joined the league after a lackluster year in the Western Jr. B League, with the Blenheim Golden Blades, Petrolia Jets, and Dresden Jr. Kings on the Canadian side. The American teams did not participate in the OHA playoffs. Blenheim would win the Border Cities Jr. B crown with a 4-games-to-2 series win over Petrolia, while Dresden would beat Leamington 3-games-to-2 with 2 ties for the Junior C crown.

In 1969-70, the league operated as two different, but interlocked, identities - the Border Cities League and the Michigan Junior Hockey League. The Canadian teams stayed with the BCJHL and added a fifth member - the Tilbury Bluebirds. Petrolia was named Junior B champions at the end of the year, uncontested, and went on to the Sutherland Cup playdowns, while Leamington beat Dresden for the Junior C championship, and Blenheim beat Tilbury for a Junior D title.

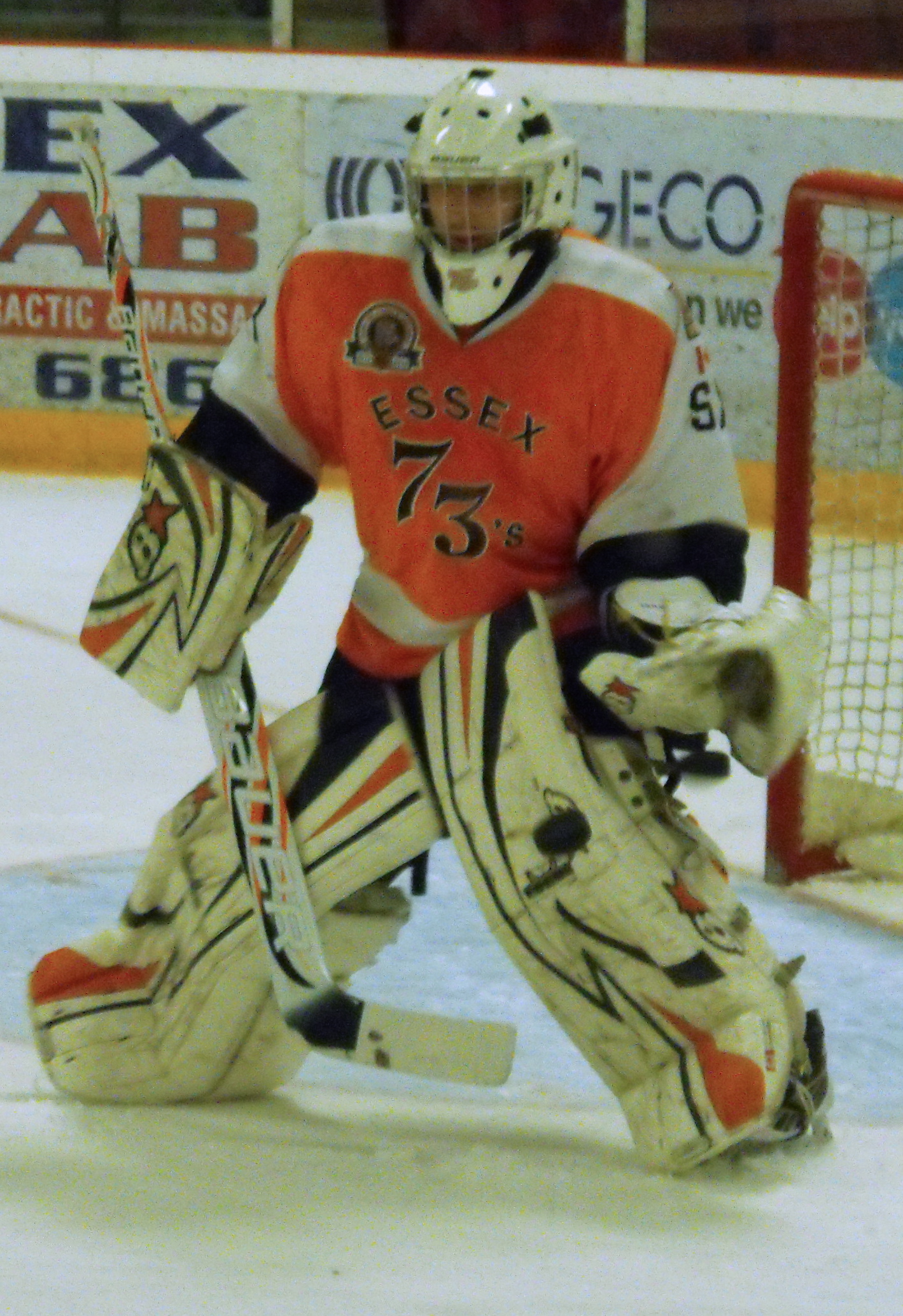
Essex 73's goalie in 40th anniversary commemorative jersey during 2013 Schmalz Cup finals.

During the summer, the league opted to separate from its Michigan brethren, who went on to form their own league. The league received an offer from a new team, the Windsor Royals. In the Fall of 1970, the league renamed itself the Great Lakes Junior Hockey League.

=== Great Lakes ===
The 1970-71 season, the first as the Great Lakes Junior Hockey League, saw the league operating with six teams. Four of the teams in the league had opted for a Junior B designation for the playoffs: Blenheim, Petrolia, Tilbury and Windsor; Dresden and Leamington remained Junior C. Petrolia would take the league Junior B crown with a dominant series victory over the upstart Royals, while the Dresden Jr. Kings went the distance and shocked the Leamington Flyers (who had finished the season with ten more wins). Dresden would go on to defeat the Central Ontario Junior C Hockey League's Champion, Bowmanville Red Eagles to win the league's first ever Provincial Championship.

In the Summer of 1971, the league expanded again with the Mooretown Flags jumping in at the Junior C level. Petrolia would defeat Windsor again at Jr. B, while Leamington gained revenge over Dresden in the Jr. C final. Leamington would manage to duplicate the deeds of the Kings in 1971, winning the 1972 OHA Junior C Championship over the Central Ontario League's Cobourg Cougars.

Before the 1972-73 season, the Petrolia Jets applied to leave the league for the Western Ontario Junior B Hockey League. They were replaced by the Sandwich West Thunderbirds of LaSalle, Ontario at the Jr. B level and the Wallaceburg Lakers in Jr. C. Windsor would win the B loop, while Leamington would again take Jr. C.

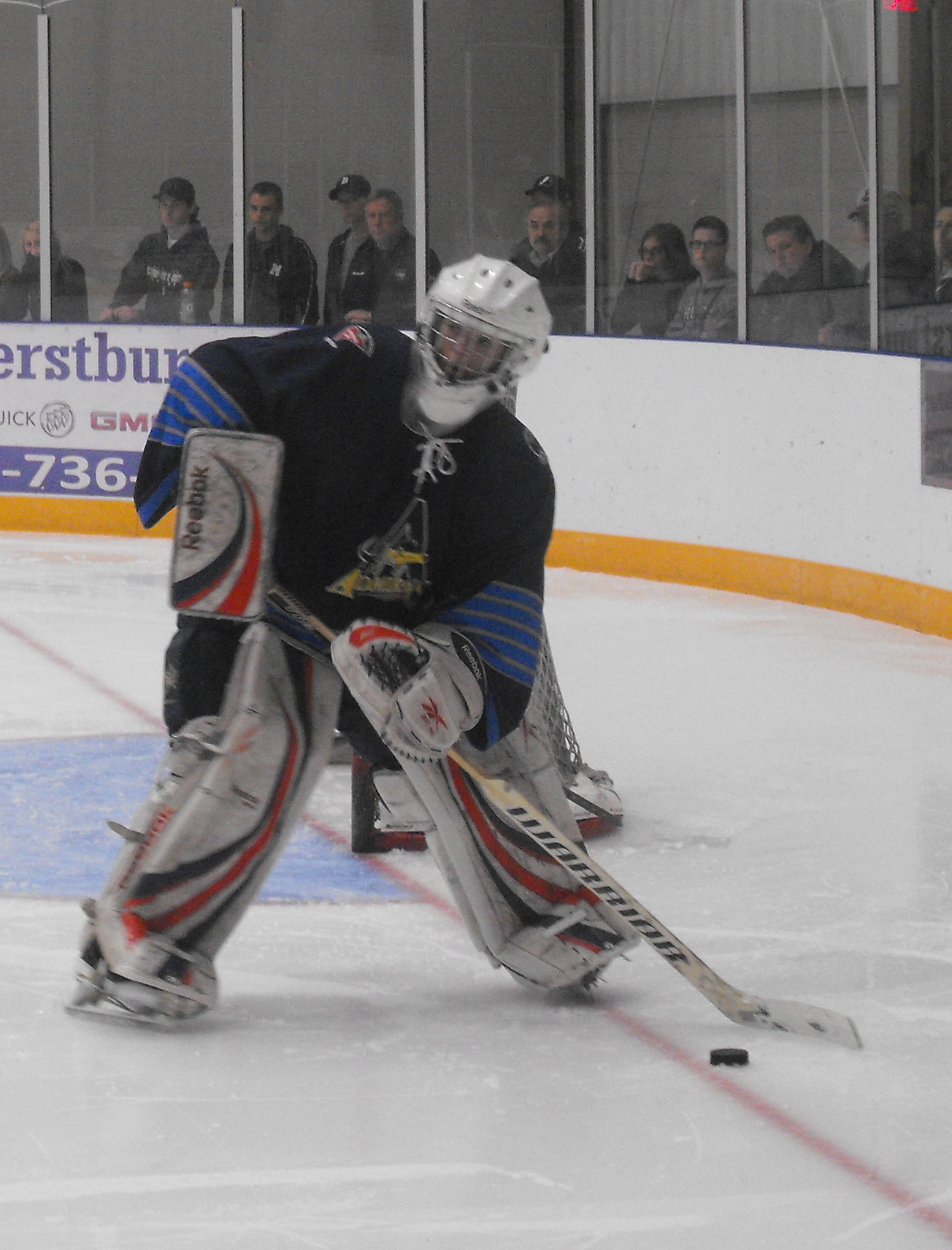
Amherstburg's goalie playing the puck at their 2013 home opener.

The Summer of 1973 brought more expansion. The Royals, disgruntled former affiliates of the Southern Ontario Junior A Hockey League's Windsor Spitfires were having a battle over which team deserved ascension to Major Junior A level. The Spitfires opted to not renew their agreement with the Royals and financially supported the new Belle River Bulldogs. They were joined by the soon-to-be powerhouse Essex 73's and Michigan Yankees of Utica, Michigan. Sandwich West did not return for a second season. Windsor walked through Tilbury and Belle River with no problem to win their second straight Jr. B title. Essex would shock everyone in the league and finish with the best record, but fell in the Jr. C finals to the Leamington Flyers.

In the Summer of 1974, the Royals were relocated to the Western Ontario Junior B Hockey League and the Michigan Yankees ceased operations. With half the teams gone from their already fragile Jr. B loop, the league opted to operate at Junior C from then on.

=== Junior C exclusive ===
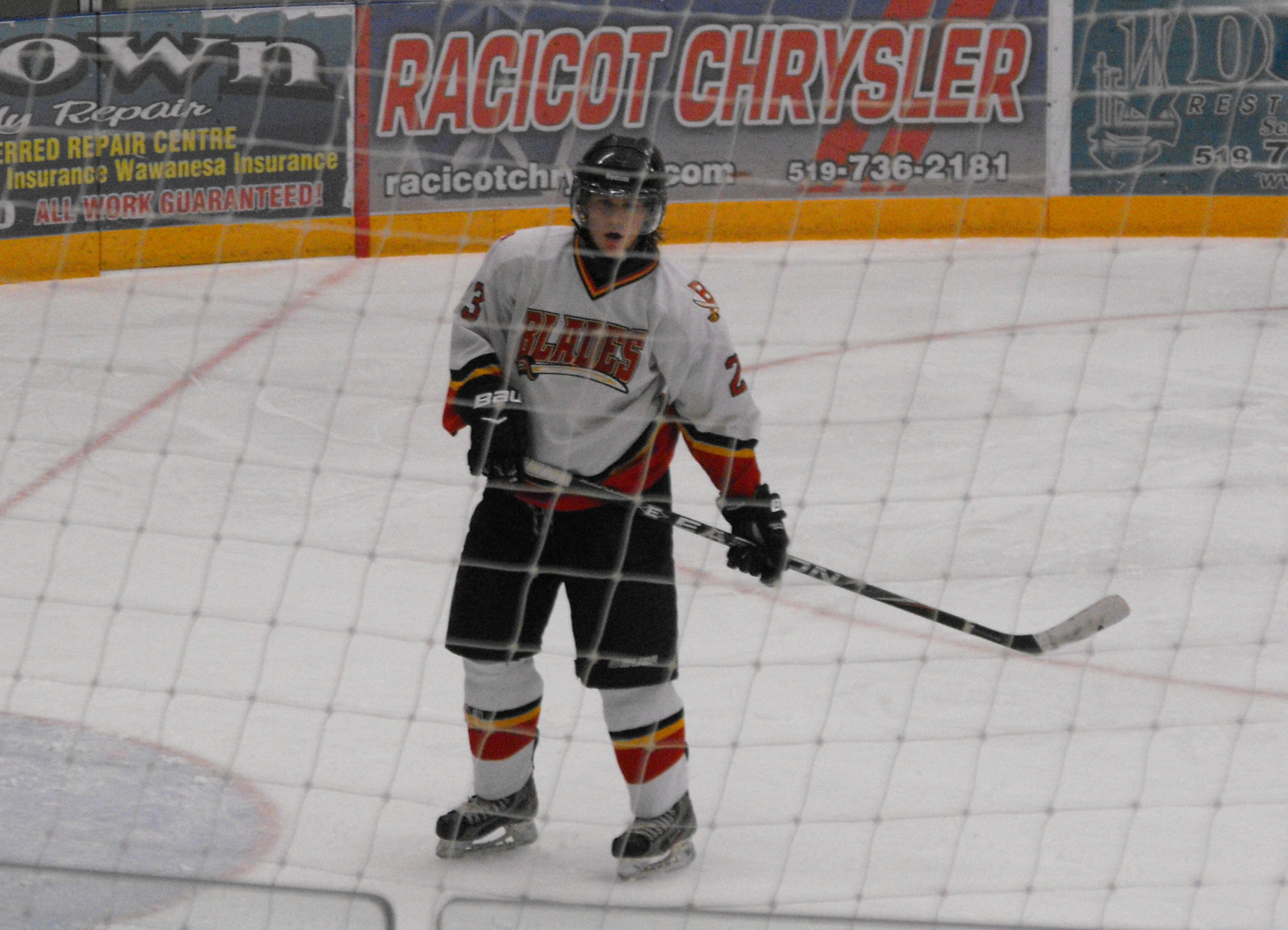
Blades player during 2013-14 season.

After eliminating the Junior B level, the Great Lakes Junior C Hockey League had dropped down to eight teams for 1974-75: Belle River, Blenheim, Dresden, Essex, Leamington, Mooretown, Tilbury, and Wallaceburg. Essex, in only their second year, would win not only the regular season title (33-8-1), the playoff championship by defeating Leamington in four-straight-games, but would march their way to their first (and the GLJCHL's third) OHA Junior C Championship by defeating the Central Ontario League's Lindsay Muskies 4-games-to-3.

In 1975, Belle River Bulldogs left the league after only two seasons. Essex would win the 1975-76 regular season title, their third straight, by beating Dresden in seven games, but would fall to the Niagara & District Junior C Hockey League's Dunnville Terriers 4-games-to-2 in the provincial final.

=== 1994 Tilbury Hawks scandal ===
In 1994, members of the Tilbury Hawks were charged with 135 various criminal violations by the Ontario Provincial Police stemming back to a rookie party in the Fall of 1993. Members of the Hawks organization, who won the league in 1992-93, had engaged in a rookie party at the team owner's house in which various hazing rituals were performed on rookies including forced drinking, group masturbation, shaving of pubic hair, and various sexual acts. Eventually, team trainer Paul Everaert and captain Ed Fiala pleaded guilty to their charges and were fined a total of $6,000. The team was forced out of Tilbury by the end of the 1993-94 season, relocating to Walpole Island and folding in 1999. The team was a part of an investigation and subject matter of an episode of The Fifth Estate.

== Teams ==
Teams
Team	Centre	Founded	Arena
Alvinston Flyers	Alvinston	1988	Brooke, Alvinston, Inwood Community Centre
Amherstburg Admirals	Amherstburg	1987	United Communities Credit Union Complex
Blenheim Blades	Blenheim	1965	Blenheim Community & Recreation Centre
Dresden Jr. Kings	Dresden	1959	Lambton-Kent Memorial Arena
Essex 73's	Essex	1973	Essex Centre Sports Complex
Lakeshore Canadiens	Belle River	1978	Lakeshore MURF Sports Complex
Mooretown Flags	Mooretown	1971	Mooretown Sports Complex
Wallaceburg Lakers	Wallaceburg	1972	Wallaceburg Memorial Arena
Wheatley Sharks	Wheatley	1995	Wheatley Area Arena

== 2015-16 Playoffs ==
Winner moves on to the Clarence Schmalz Cup.

Quarterfinals
1	Essex	4
8	Alvinston	0
4	Mooretown	4
5	Lakeshore	3
2	Blenheim	4
7	Dresden	2
3	Amherstburg	4
6	Wheatley	0

Semifinals
1	Essex	4
4	Mooretown	0
2	Blenheim	2
3	Amherstburg	4

Finals
1	Essex	4
3	Amherstburg	3

== Playoff champions ==
Teams
Year	Champion	Finalist	Result in Provincials
Bluewater League
1968	Jr. C - Dresden Jr. Kings	Petrolia Jets	Lost QF to Georgetown (Sub)
--	Jr. D - Exeter Hawks	Alvinston Flyers	Lost SF to Mitchell (S)
Border Cities League
1969	Jr. B - Blenheim Blades	Petrolia Jets	Lost QF to Hamilton (ND)
--	Jr. C - Dresden Jr. Kings	Leamington Flyers	Lost QF to Woodstock (Int)
1970	Jr. B - Petrolia Jets	Uncontested	Lost QF to Hamilton (ND)
--	Jr. C - Leamington Flyers	Dresden Jr. Kings	Lost SF to Hespeler (CW)
--	Jr. D - Blenheim Blades	Tilbury Bluebirds	Lost QF to Exeter (W)
Great Lakes League
1971	Jr. B - Petrolia Jets	Windsor Royals	Lost SF to Hamilton (ND)
--	Jr. C - Dresden Jr. Kings	Leamington Flyers	WON CSC vs. Bowmanville (CL)
1972	Jr. B - Petrolia Jets	Windsor Royals	Lost QF vs. St. Marys (WO)
--	Jr. C - Leamington Flyers	Dresden Jr. Kings	WON CSC vs. Cobourg (CL)
1973	Jr. B - Windsor Royals	Blenheim Blades	Lost QF to Sarnia (WO)
--	Jr. C - Leamington Flyers	Wallaceburg Lakers	Lost SF to Caledonia (CW)
1974	Jr. B - Windsor Royals	Belle River Bulldogs	Lost QF to Sarnia (WO)
--	Jr. C - Leamington Flyers	Essex 73's	Lost SF to Simcoe (CW)
Great Lakes Jr. C League
1975	Essex 73's	Leamington Flyers	WON CSC vs. Lindsay (CL)
1976	Essex 73's	Dresden Jr. Kings	Lost Final to Dunnville (ND)
1977	Essex 73's	Dresden Jr. Kings	WON CSC vs. Bowmanville (CL)
1978	Essex 73's	Dresden Jr. Kings	WON CSC vs. Bowmanville (CL)
1979	Leamington Flyers	Blenheim Blades	Lost SF to Kincardine (CW)
1980	Leamington Flyers	Essex 73's	WON CSC vs. Bradford (MO)
1981	Essex 73's	Leamington Flyers	Lost Final to Bowmanville (C)
1982	Leamington Flyers	Essex 73's	Lost Cons. to Penetang (GB)
1983	Leamington Flyers	Wallaceburg Lakers	Lost SF to Dunnville (ND)
1984	Dresden Jr. Kings	Belle River Canadiens	Lost SF to Woodstock (ND)
1985	Belle River Canadiens	Essex 73's	WON CSC vs. Midland (MO)
1986	Essex 73's	Mooretown Flags	Lost SF to Norwich (ND)
1987	Essex 73's	Dresden Jr. Kings	Lost QF to Hanover (GB)
1988	Mooretown Flags	Leamington Flyers	WON CSC vs. Port Perry (C)
1989	Belle River Canadiens	Clearwater Steeplejacks	Lost SF to Hanover (WO)
1990	Belle River Canadiens	Walpole Island Hawks	Lost Final to Orangeville (MO)
1991	Belle River Canadiens	Walpole Island Hawks	Lost SF to Hanover (WO)
1992	Belle River Canadiens	Walpole Island Hawks	WON CSC vs. Stayner (GB)
1993	Tilbury Hawks	Mooretown Flags	Lost QF to Hanover (WO)
1994	Belle River Canadiens	Clearwater Steeplejacks	WON CSC vs. Rockton (ND)
1995	Belle River Canadiens	Blenheim Blades	WON CSC vs. Bowmanville (C)
1996	Belle River Canadiens	Walpole Island Hawks	Lost SF to Paris (ND)
1997	Belle River Canadiens	Mooretown Flags	Lost Final to Glanbrook (ND)
1998	Essex 73's	Wallaceburg Lakers	Lost SF to Kincardine (WO)
1999	Wallaceburg Lakers	Belle River Canadiens	Lost Final to Glanbrook (ND)
2000	Belle River Canadiens	Wallaceburg Lakers	Lost Final to Lakefield (C)
2001	Belle River Canadiens	Wallaceburg Lakers	Lost Final to Chippawa (ND)
2002	Essex 73's	Wheatley-Southpoint Sharks	WON CSC vs. Uxbridge (C)
2003	Essex 73's	Wheatley-Southpoint Sharks	Lost SF to Grimsby (ND)
2004	Dresden Jr. Kings	Essex 73's	Lost SF to Wingham (WO)
2005	Essex 73's	Dresden Jr. Kings	WON CSC vs. Grimsby (ND)
2006	Essex 73's	Wheatley-Southpoint Sharks	Lost Final to Penetang (GMO)
2007	Essex 73's	Belle River Canadiens	Lost Final to Penetang (GMO)
2008	Essex 73's	Wallaceburg Lakers	Lost Final to Alliston (GMO)
2009	Essex 73's	Dresden Jr. Kings	WON CSC vs. Alliston (GMO)
2010	Belle River Canadiens	Wallaceburg Lakers	Lost Final to Alliston (GMO)
2011	Belle River Canadiens	Wheatley Sharks	Lost SF to Grimsby (ND)
2012	Essex 73's	Belle River Canadiens	Lost SF to Grimsby (ND)
2013	Essex 73's	Wheatley Sharks	Lost Final to Picton (EB)
2014	Essex 73's	Belle River Canadiens	Lost Final to Lakefield (C)
2015	Essex 73's	Amherstburg Admirals	WON CSC vs. Port Hope (EB)
2016	Essex 73's	Amherstburg Admirals	Lost SF to Ayr (MW)

== Regular season champions ==
Season	Champion	Record	Points
Bluewater League
1967-68	Dresden Jr. Kings	14-6-3-0	31
Border Cities League
1968-69	St. Clair Shores	22-6-4-0	48
1969-70	Petrolia Jets	28-8-0-0	56
Great Lakes League
1970-71	Petrolia Jets	31-8-1-0	63
1971-72	Petrolia Jets	32-3-1-0	65
1972-73	Leamington Flyers*	34-6-2-0	70
1973-74	Essex 73's	34-6-4-0	72
Great Lakes Jr. C League
1974-75	Essex 73's	33-8-1-0	67
1975-76	Essex 73's	30-9-3-0	63
1976-77	Essex 73's	27-11-4-0	58
1977-78	Essex 73's	39-2-1-0	79
1978-79	Blenheim Blades	26-11-3-0	55
1979-80	Leamington Flyers	36-4-2-0	74
1980-81	Essex 73's	32-7-3-0	67
1981-82	Mooretown Flags	27-8-3-0	57
1982-83	Leamington Flyers	29-8-2-0	62
1983-84	Dresden Jr. Kings	28-6-6-0	62
1984-85	Belle River Canadiens	27-9-4-0	58
1985-86	Essex 73's	25-9-6-0	56
1986-87	Petrolia Jets	30-6-1-2	63
1987-88	Leamington Flyers	26-10-3-0	55
1988-89	Belle River Canadiens	30-6-2-0	62
1989-90	Belle River Canadiens	37-1-2-0	76
1990-91	Belle River Canadiens	29-6-3-1	62
1991-92	Belle River Canadiens	35-4-1-0	71
1992-93	Tilbury Hawks	29-8-2-1	61
1993-94	Belle River Canadiens	35-2-3-0	73
1994-95	Belle River Canadiens	38-0-1-1	78
1995-96	Belle River Canadiens	38-2-2-0	78
1996-97	Belle River Canadiens	39-0-1-0	79
1997-98	Belle River Canadiens	34-8-3-0	71
1998-99	Belle River Canadiens	32-6-1-1	66
1999-00	Belle River Canadiens	33-3-3-0	69
2000-01	Belle River Canadiens	32-3-2-3	69
2001-02	Essex 73's	30-8-0-2	62
2002-03	Essex 73's	33-4-3-0	69
2003-04	Essex 73's	33-3-4-0	70
2004-05	Essex 73's	32-5-1-2	67
2005-06	Wheatley-Southpoint Sharks	29-8-1-2	61
2006-07	Essex 73's	32-4-2-2	68
2007-08	Essex 73's	33-3-2-2	70
2008-09	Essex 73's	39-0-0-1	79
2009-10	Belle River Canadiens	31-7-0-2	64
2010-11	Wallaceburg Lakers	30-8-0-2	62
2011-12	Essex 73's	33-6-0-1	67
2012-13	Essex 73's	32-6-0-2	66
2013-14	Essex 73's	34-3-0-3	71
2014-15	Essex 73's	33-5-0-2	68
2015-16	Essex 73's	34-3-1-2	71

(*) Leamington awarded 1972-73 regular season title over Windsor Royals due to winning head-to-head record.

== Former member teams ==
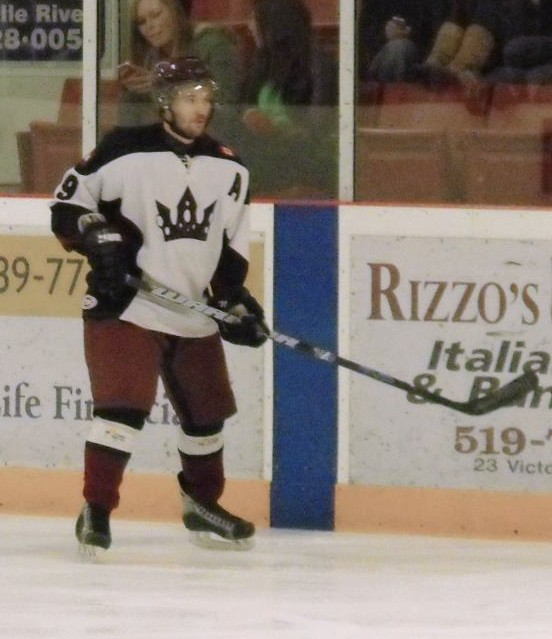
Dresden defenceman lining up for play in 2013 GLJHL Finals in Essex, Ontario.

- Amherstburg Vikings/North Stars
- Clearwater Steeplejacks
- Leamington Flyers
- Michigan Yankees
- Petrolia Jets
- Sandwich West Thunderbirds
- Tilbury Bluebirds/Falcons
- Tilbury Hawks/Walpole Island Hawks
- Windsor Royals

== Professional alumni ==
National Hockey League

- Chris Allen (Blenheim 1992-93)
- Darren Banks (Leamington 1983-84)
- Bob Boughner (Belle River 1986-87)
- Ted Bulley (Windsor 1971-72)
- Bruce Crowder (Essex 1974-75)
- Keith Crowder (Essex 1975-76)
- Brian Dobbin (Mooretown 1980-82)
- Tie Domi (Belle River 1984-85)
- Dave Gagnon (Essex 1984-85; 1985–86)
- Rick Heinz (Windsor 1972-73)
- Dave Kelly (Dresden 1969-70)
- Kris Manery (Leamington 1972-73)
- Matt Martin (Blenheim 2005-06)
- Mike Natyshak (Belle River 1979-82)
- Rumun Ndur (Clearwater 1991-92)
- Warren Rychel (Essex 1983-84)
- D. J. Smith (Belle River, Chippawa 1992-93)
- Alek Stojanov (Belle River, Amherstburg 1988-89)
- John Van Boxmeer (Petrolia 1970-71)
- Todd Warriner (Blenheim 1988-89)
- Derek Wilkinson (Belle River 1989-90)
- Brian Wiseman (Dresden 1986-87)
