= Central Ontario Junior C Hockey League =

Junior ice hockey league

Central Ontario Junior "C" Hockey League
Head Office	Cambridge, Ontario
Official Web site	oha.pointstreaksites
Chairman	Trevor Tinney
Convenors	Jim Orr
Operated	1970-2016

The Central Ontario Junior C Hockey League was a junior ice hockey league in Ontario, Canada, sanctioned by the Ontario Hockey Association. The "Central" played inter-league games with the Empire Junior "C" League. The champion of the Central competed for the All-Ontario Championship and the Clarence Schmalz Cup. The league is now a division in the Provincial Junior Hockey League.

== History ==
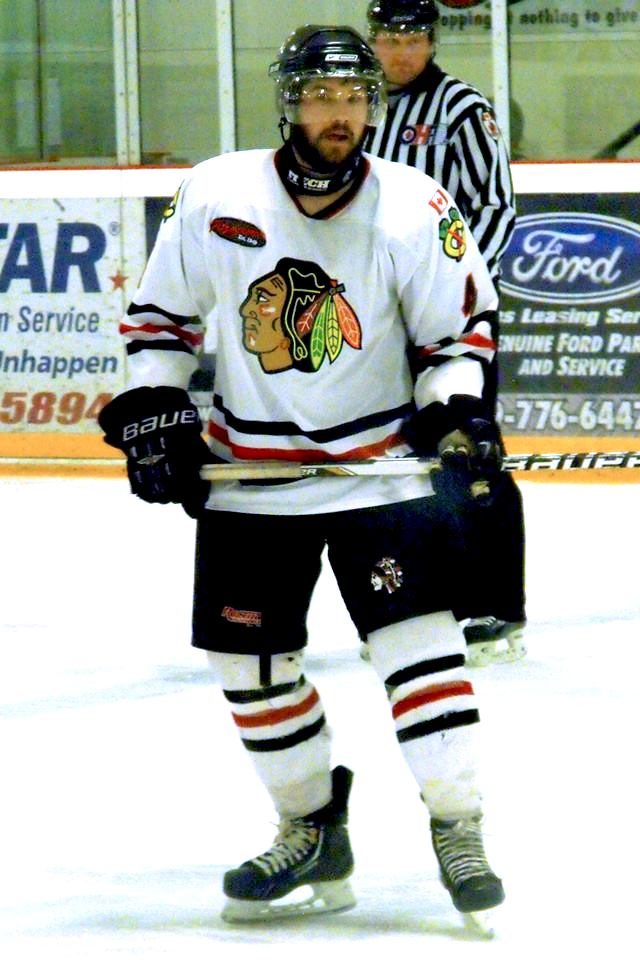
Lakefield Chiefs player during 2014 Schmalz Cup Final.

In 1970, the Suburban Junior C Hockey League divided into two leagues. Most of the westerly teams formed the Mid-Ontario Junior B Hockey League, while most of the easterly teams formed the Central Lakeshore Junior C League. In 1972, the Eastern Junior B Hockey League was also divided up, half to the Metro Junior B Hockey League and the other half to the Central League. With this, the Eastern Junior C Loop became the Quinte-St. Lawrence Junior C Hockey League, the Central League's main territorial rival until 1986.

In 1986, the Quinte-St. Lawrence League folded. The Wellington Dukes fled to the Central League and the Gananoque Islanders joined the Ottawa District Hockey Association's Eastern Ontario Junior B Hockey League.

With a plethora of major towns in the league: Trenton, Ajax, Bowmanville, Port Hope, Lindsay, Cobourg, and the retirement community-backed Wellington Dukes; the Central Junior B Hockey League absorbed many of these franchises over the course of a couple years in their run to Junior A status—obtained in 1993.

Since losing half of their teams, the Central Ontario League has survived with the likes of Georgina, Lakefield, Little Britain, Port Perry, and Uxbridge. A sixth team has failed to stick in most cases, in towns like Bobcaygeon and Madoc. Due to retraction in the Ontario Junior Hockey League, the Bowmanville Eagles have returned in 2011 in the form of the Clarington Eagles but Ajax remains unserviced after their team left Junior A, both having folded in 2010.

Following the 2015-16 seasons the Central Ontario Junior C Hockey League amalgamated with the other southern Ontario junior "C" hockey leagues and became a division within the Provincial Junior Hockey League.

== The teams ==
Team	Founded	Centre	Arena
Clarington Eagles	2011	Clarington	Garnet B. Rickard Recreation Complex
Georgina Ice	1994	Keswick	Georgina Ice Palace
Lakefield Chiefs	1980	Lakefield	Lakefield-Smith Community Centre
Little Britain Merchants	1978	Little Britain	Little Britain Community Centre
North Kawartha Knights	2014	Apsley	North Kawartha Community Centre
Port Perry Mojacks	1972	Port Perry	Scugog Arena
Uxbridge Bruins	1975	Uxbridge	Uxbridge Arena and Recreation Centre

== 2015-2016 league playoffs ==
For the Ontario Hockey Association "All-Ontario Jr. "C" Championship", please go to the Clarence Schmalz Cup.

Quarter-final
1	Clarington	BYE
2	Uxbridge	BYE
3'	Port Perry	4
6	North Kawartha	0
4	Little Britain	0
5	Lakefield	4

Semi-final
1	Clarington	4
5	Lakefield	2
2	Uxbridge	0
4	Port Perry	4

Final
1	Clarington	1
4	Port Perry	4

== Cougar Cup champions ==
Year	Champion	Finalist	Result in Provincials
1971	Bowmanville Eagles		Lost Final to Dresden (GL)
1972	Cobourg Cougars	Lindsay Mercurys	Lost Final to Leamington (GL)
1973	Lindsay Mercurys		Lost Final to Caledonia (W)
1974	Cobourg Cougars		Won CSC vs. Simcoe (W)
1975	Lindsay Muskies		Lost Final to Essex (GL)
1976	Cobourg Cougars		Lost SF to Dunnville (ND)
1977	Bowmanville Eagles		Lost Final to Essex (GL)
1978	Bowmanville Eagles		Lost Final to Essex (GL)
1979	Bowmanville Eagles		Won CSC vs. Kincardine (W)
1980	Lindsay Muskies		Lost QF to Gananoque (QSL)
1981	Bowmanville Eagles	Lindsay Muskies	Won CSC vs. Essex (GL)
1982	Bowmanville Eagles	Lindsay Muskies	Lost Final to Flamborough (ND)
1983	Lindsay Muskies	Bowmanville Eagles	Lost Final to Dunnville (ND)
1984	Bowmanville Eagles	Little Britain Merchants	Lost SF to Penetang (GB)
1985	Bowmanville Eagles	Lakefield Chiefs	Lost SF to Midland (MO)
1986	Lakefield Chiefs	Cobourg Cougars	Lost SF to Bradford (MO)
1987	Lakefield Chiefs	Wellington Dukes	Won CSC vs. Norwich (ND)
1988	Port Perry Mojacks	Wellington Dukes	Lost Final to Mooretown (GL)
1989	Lakefield Chiefs	Wellington Dukes	Lost SF to Bradford (MO)
1990	Port Perry Mojacks		Lost QF to Napanee (EO)
1991	Uxbridge Bruins		Lost SF to Orangeville (MO)
1992	Port Perry Mojacks		Lost SF to Stayner (GB)
1993	Bowmanville Eagles		Lost QF to Napanee (EO)
1994	Bowmanville Eagles		Lost SF to Rockton (ND)
1995	Bowmanville Eagles		Lost Final to Belle River (GL)
1996	Uxbridge Bruins		Lost QF to Napanee (EB)
1997	Lakefield Chiefs		Lost SF to Glanbrook (ND)
1998	Little Britain Merchants		Lost SF to Glanbrook (ND)
1999	Lakefield Chiefs	Uxbridge Bruins	Lost SF to Glanbrook (ND)
2000	Lakefield Chiefs	Georgina Ice	Won CSC vs. Belle River (GL)
2001	Uxbridge Bruins	Lakefield Chiefs	Lost SF to Chippawa (ND)
2002	Uxbridge Bruins	Lakefield Chiefs	Lost Final to Essex (GL)
2003	Georgina Ice	Lakefield Chiefs	Lost Final to Grimsby (ND)
2004	Lakefield Chiefs	Georgina Ice	Lost SF to Grimsby (ND)
2005	Uxbridge Bruins	Port Perry Mojacks	Lost SF to Grimsby (ND)
2006	Port Perry Mojacks	Uxbridge Bruins	Lost SF to Penetang (GMO)
2007	Lakefield Chiefs	Port Perry Mojacks	Lost SF to Penetang (GMO)
2008	Georgina Ice	Lakefield Chiefs	Lost QF to Napanee (EB)
2009	Uxbridge Bruins	Lakefield Chiefs	Lost QF to Amherstview (EB)
2010	Little Britain Merchants	Uxbridge Bruins	Lost QF to Napanee (EB)
2011	Port Perry Mojacks	Uxbridge Bruins	Lost QF to Picton (EB)
2012	Clarington Eagles	Lakefield Chiefs	Lost QF to Campbellford (EB)
2013	Lakefield Chiefs	Uxbridge Bruins	Lost QF to Picton (EB)
2014	Lakefield Chiefs	Uxbridge Bruins	Won CSC vs. Essex (GL)
2015	Clarington Eagles	Uxbridge Bruins	Lost QF to Port Hope (EB)
2016	Port Perry Mojacks	Clarington Eagles	Lost QF to Port Hope (EB)

== Regular season champions ==
Season	Champion	Record	Points
1970-71
1971-72
1972-73
1973-74
1974-75	Port Perry Mojacks	22-11-2-0	46
1975-76	Cobourg Cougars	25-7-4-0	54
1976-77	Port Hope Panthers
1977-78
1978-79
1979-80	Cobourg Cougars	20-6-6-0	46
1980-81
1981-82
1982-83
1983-84	Bowmanville Eagles	27-2-5-0	59
1984-85
1985-86
1986-87
1987-88	Lakefield Chiefs	27-3-2-0	56
1988-89	Lakefield Chiefs	27-7-6-0	60
1989-90	Bowmanville Eagles	27-7-2-0	56
1990-91	Uxbridge Bruins	22-11-3-0	47
1991-92	Port Perry Mojacks	26-6-2-0	54
1992-93	Little Britain Merchants	25-12-2-1	53
1993-94	Bowmanville Eagles	22-7-1-0	45
1994-95	Bowmanville Eagles	31-4-0-1	63
1995-96	Uxbridge Bruins	29-8-3-2	63
1996-97	Uxbridge Bruins	31-6-2-1	65
1997-98	Little Britain Merchants	27-8-4-1	59
1998-99	Lakefield Chiefs	27-9-2-2	58
1999-00	Lakefield Chiefs	38-1-1-0	77
2000-01	Lakefield Chiefs	29-7-2-2	62
2001-02	Uxbridge Bruins	31-5-3-3	68
2002-03	Georgina Ice	22-10-6-0	50
2003-04	Georgina Ice	22-10-4-2	50
2004-05	Uxbridge Bruins	27-7-4-2	60
2005-06	Port Perry Mojacks	32-8-0-2	66
2006-07	Port Perry Mojacks	22-14-3-1	48
2007-08	Lakefield Chiefs	27-13-0-0	54
2008-09	Uxbridge Bruins	24-9-7-0	55
2009-10	Uxbridge Bruins	31-7-0-2	64
2010-11	Uxbridge Bruins	28-11-0-1	57
2011-12	Lakefield Chiefs	27-10-0-3	57
2012-13	Uxbridge Bruins	30-7-0-3	63
2013-14	Lakefield Chiefs	35-4-0-1	71
2014-15	Uxbridge Bruins	30-9-0-3	63
2015-16	Clarington Eagles	36-3-2-1	75

== Former member teams ==
- Ajax Axemen
- Bobcaygeon Bullets
- Bowmanville Eagles
- Brighton Bruins
- Cobourg Cougars
- Lindsay Muskies
- Madoc Hurricanes
- Port Hope Panthers
- Stouffville Clippers
- Trenton Golden Hawks
- Wellington Dukes

== See also ==
- Provincial Junior Hockey League, for the PJHL Orr Division
- Clarence Schmalz Cup, for the Ontario Hockey Association All-Ontario Jr. "C" Championship
