= Lakefield Chiefs =

Canadian junior ice hockey team

- City: Lakefield, Ontario
- League: Provincial Junior Hockey League
- Conference: East
- Division: Tod
- Founded: Circa 1980
- Home arena: Lakefield-Smith Community Centre
- Colours: Red, Yellow, and White
- General manager: Nick O'Brien
- Head coach: Jamie Arcand

Championships
- League champions: EJDHL: 1978 and 1979; CJCHL: 1987, 1989, 1997, 1999, 2000, 2004, 2007, 2013, 2014, 2017, 2018, 2026
- Clarence Schmalz Cups: 1987, 2000, 2014, 2018
- OHA Cups: 1978, 1979

The Lakefield Chiefs are a Canadian Junior ice hockey team based in Lakefield, Ontario, Canada. They played in the Central Ontario Junior C Hockey League of the Ontario Hockey Association until the 2016–17 season when this league became the Orr Division of the Provincial Junior Hockey League

== History ==
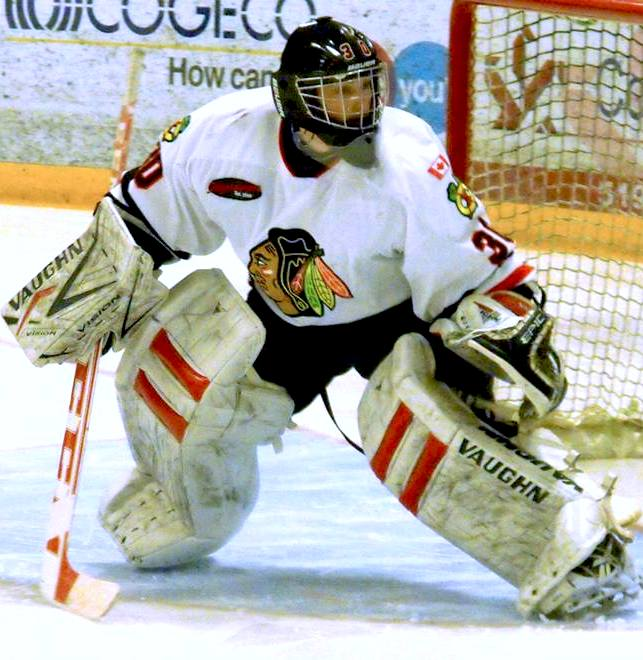
Lakefield's goalie during 2014 Schmalz Cup final.

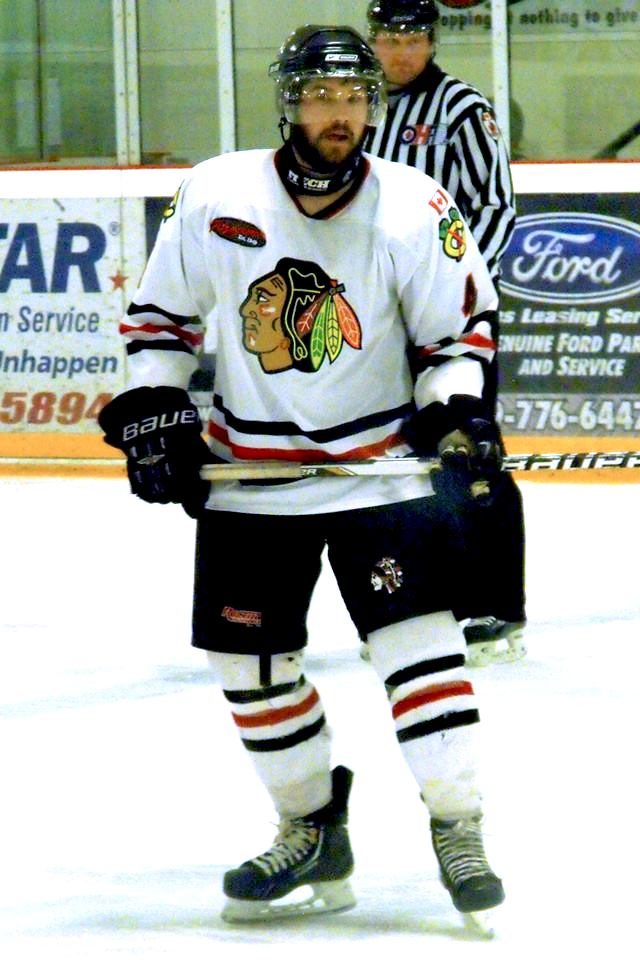
Lakefield player during 2014 Schmalz Cup final.

The Lakefield Chiefs emerged in the late 1970s as members of the Eastern Junior D Hockey League.

In the 1977–78 season, the Chiefs were Eastern league champions and faced off against the Western Ontario Junior D Hockey League Champions the Exeter Hawks. In a long and tight series, the Chiefs won game 7 and the series 4-games-to-3 to win their first OHA Cup as provincial champions.

A year later, the Chiefs were again the Eastern league champions. The Chiefs defeated the Western Ontario league's St. George Dukes 4-games-to-2 to clinch their second straight OHA Cup as Ontario Junior "D" Champions.

In 1980, the Lakefield Chiefs were promoted to join the Central Lakeshore Junior C Hockey League. Around 1986, the league merged with the Quinte-St. Lawrence Junior C Hockey League and became the Central Ontario Junior C Hockey League. That same year, the Chiefs won the Central Lakeshore championship.

In 1987, the Chiefs won the Central Ontario league championship. They moved on to the provincial championships and found themselves in the Clarence Schmalz Cup final against the Niagara & District Junior C Hockey League's Norwich Merchants. The Chiefs came out victorious, winning the series 4-games-to-2 to win their first Clarence Schmalz Cup.

Over the next eleven seasons, the Chiefs won three league titles. They won in 1989, 1997, and 1999. In 2000, the Lakefield Chiefs won their third league championship in four years. This year was different. They pushed deep into provincial playdowns and found themselves again in the Clarence Schmalz Cup finals. Their opponent ended up being the Great Lakes Junior C Hockey League's Belle River Canadiens. The Chiefs defeated them to win their second All-Ontario title at the Junior "C" level 4-games-to-2.

The Chiefs won their league again in 2004.

In 2005–06, the Chiefs finished the season in fourth place. In the league quarter-final, the Chiefs defeated the Georgina Ice 3-games-to-none. In the league semi-final, the Chiefs ran into the top seeded Port Perry Mojacks. The Mojacks defeated the Chiefs 4-games-to-1 to move on to the league final.

The 2006–07 season, the Chiefs won the regular season crown to earn the top seed in the playoffs. In the league semi-final, the Chiefs played against the Uxbridge Bruins and swept them 4-games-to-none. In the league final, the Chiefs also swept the Port Perry Mojacks 4-games-to-none to win the league championship. They moved on to the provincial quarter-finals where they were pitted against the Empire B Junior C Hockey League's Amherstview Jets. The Chiefs beat the Jets 4-games-to-2 to advance further. In the provincial semi-final, the Chiefs ran into the Georgian Mid-Ontario Junior C Hockey League's Penetang Kings. The Chiefs were swept 4-games-to-none by the Kings.

On February 8, 2024, the PJHL announced a conference realignment that would take place starting the 2024-25 season. Lakefield, along with North Kawartha would move from the Orr division into the Tod division.

== Season-by-season results ==
Season	GP	W	L	T	OTL	GF	GA	P	Results	Playoffs
1978-79	Statistics unavailable									Won League; Won OHA Cup, 4-3 (Hawks)
1979-80	24	15	9	0	-	--	--	30	1st of 4 CJDHL	Won League; Won OHA Cup, 4-2 (Dukes)
1980-81	36	12	21	3	-	165	217	27	7th of 10 COJCHL	
1981-83	Statistics unavailable									
1983-84	34	20	8	6	-	--	--	46	3rd of 9 COJCHL	
1984-85	Statistics unavailable									Lost final (Eagles)
1986-87	Statistics unavailable									Won League (Cougars); Lost CSC SF, 0-4 (Bulls)
1986-87	Statistics unavailable									Won League (Dukes); Won CSC SF, 4-3 (Bulls); Won CSC Final, 4-2 (Merchants)
1987-88	32	27	3	2	-	271	114	56	1st of 11 COJCHL	
1988-89	40	27	7	6	-	293	182	60	1st of 11 COJCHL	Won League, 4-2 (Dukes); Lost CSC SF, 2-4 (Bulls)
1989-90	36	12	22	2	-	177	243	26	6th of 7 COJCHL	
1990-91	36	19	17	0	-	142	161	38	4th of 7 COJCHL	
1991-92	34	5	26	0	3	130	193	13	6th of 6 COJCHL	
1992-93	40	22	15	2	1	236	180	47	4th of 6 COJCHL	
1993-94	29	13	13	1	2	137	135	29	4th of 6 COJCHL	
1994-95	36	16	16	1	3	158	174	36	5th of 7 COJCHL	
1995-96	42	12	27	3	0	162	252	27	5th of 6 COJCHL	
1996-97	40	22	12	3	3	182	136	50	2nd of 6 COJCHL	Won League; Won CSC QF (Rebels); Lost CSC SF, 0-4 (Rangers)
1997-98	40	25	12	3	1	241	167	52	2nd of 6 COJCHL	
1998-99	40	27	9	2	2	218	136	58	1st of 6 COJCHL	Won semi-final, 4-0 (Merchants); Won League, 4-2 (Bruins); Won CSC QF, 4-1 (Pirates); Lost CSC SF, 1-4 (Rangers)
1999-00	40	38	1	1	0	303	102	77	1st of 6 COJCHL	Won semi-final, 4-0 (Bruins); Won League, 4-0 (Ice); Won CSC QF, 4-0 (Rebels); Won CSC SF, 4-2 (Riverhawks); Won CSC Final, 4-2 (Canadiens)
2000-01	40	29	7	2	2	183	118	62	1st of 6 COJCHL	Won semi-final, 4-0 (Mojacks); Lost final, 2-4 (Bruins)
2001-02	42	23	14	5	0	182	119	51	3rd of 6 COJCHL	Won semi-final, 4-0 (Mojacks); Lost final, 2-4 (Bruins)
2002-03	38	17	16	4	1	147	119	39	3rd of 5 COJCHL	Won semi-final, 4-2 (Bruins); Lost final, 3-4 (Ice)
2003-04	38	21	9	7	1	157	130	50	2nd of 5 COJCHL	Won semi-final, 4-3 (Bruins); Won League, 4-3 (Ice); Won CSC QF, 4-2 (Rebels); Lost CSC SF, 1-4 (Peach Kings)
2004-05	40	26	12	2	0	163	103	54	2nd of 5 COJCHL	Lost semi-final, 2-4 (Mojacks)
2005-06	42	20	22	0	0	148	171	40	4th of 5 COJCHL	Won quarter-final, 3-0 (Ice); Lost semi-final, 1-4 (Mojacks)
2006-07	40	21	13	4	2	169	150	48	1st of 5 COJCHL	Won semi-final, 4-0 (Bruins); Won League, 4-0 (Mojacks); Won CSC QF, 4-2 (Jets); Lost CSC SF, 0-4 (Kings)
2007-08	40	27	13	0	0	160	111	54	1st of 5 COJCHL	Won semi-final, 4-0 (Bruins); Lost final, 0-4 (Ice)
2008-09	40	19	16	3	2	171	173	43	3rd of 5 COJCHL	Won semi-final, 4-0 (Mojacks); Lost final, 0-4 (Bruins)
2009-10	40	10	29	-	1	154	203	21	5th of 5 COJCHL	Won quarter-final, 3-0 (Ice); Lost semi-final, 2-4 (Bruins)
2010-11	40	16	21	-	3	178	211	35	5th of 5 COJCHL	Lost quarter-final, 2-3 (Merchants)
2011-12	40	27	10	-	3	208	141	57	1st of 6 COJCHL	Won semi-final, 4-1 (Ice); Lost final, 2-4 (Eagles)
2012-13	40	28	8	-	4	184	102	60	2nd of 6 COJCHL	Won semi-final, 4-0 (Eagles); Won League, 4-1 (Bruins); Lost CSC QF, 3-4 (Pirates)
2013-14	40	35	4	-	1	217	99	71	1st of 6 COJCHL	Won semi-final, 4-0 (Mojacks); Won League, 4-1 (Bruins); Won CSC QF, 4-3 (Pirates); Won CSC SF, 4-0 (Peach Kings); Won CSC Final, 4-0 (73's)
2014-15	42	29	12	-	1	193	123	59	2nd of 7 COJCHL	Lost semi-final, 0-4 (Eagles)
2015-16	42	21	18	3	0	151	133	45	5th of 7 COJCHL	Won quarter-final, 4-0 (Merchants); Lost semi-final, 2-4 (Eagles)
2016-17	41	32	7	2	-	188	108	66	1st of 7 Orr Div. PJHL	Won Div. SF, 4-2 (Pirates); Won Div. Final, 4-0 (Eagles); Lost Conf. Final, 2-4 (Panthers)
2017-18	41	33	4	1	3	225	98	70	1st of 7 Orr Div. PJHL	Won Div SF, 4-0 (Knights); Won Div. Final, 4-1 (Mojacks); Won Conf. Finals, 4-3 (Panthers); Won League Semifinal 4-3 (Siskins); Won League Final, 4-1 (Rangers); Clarence Schmalz Cup Champions
2018-19	42	30	8	1	3	184	95	64	2nd of 7 Orr Div. PJHL	Lost Div Semis, 3-4 (Knights)
2019-20	42	25	13	2	2	176	84	54	3rd of 7 Orr Div. PJHL	Lost Div Semis, 3-4 (Knights)
2020-21	Season Lost due to COVID-19 pandemic									
2021-22	32	12	15	4	1	95	119	29	6th of 7 Orr Div. PJHL	Won Div Quarters, 4-2 (Bruins); L Div Semis 2-4 (Merchants)
2022-23	42	10	30	2	0	96	179	22	7th of 7 Orr Div. PJHL	Lost Div Quarters, 1-4 (Ice)
2023-24	42	20	18	3	1	160	176	44	4th of 7 Orr Div. PJHL	Won Div Quarters, 4-0 (Lumberjacks); Lost Div Semifinals, 1-4 (Eagles)
2024-25	42	25	16	1	1	199	129	51	5th of 8 Tod Div; 7th of 15 East Conf; 25th of 63 - PJHL	Won Div Quarters, 4-0 (Pirates); Lost Div Semifinals, 3-4 (Huskies)
2025-26	42	30	10	1	1	208	127	62	1st of 7 Tod Div; 3rd of 14 East Conf; 11th of 61 - PJHL	bye Quarters, 0-0; Won Div Semifinals, 4-0 (Pirates); Lost Div Finals 1-4 (Huskies)(ll

== Schmalz Cup Finals appearances ==
1987: Lakefield Chiefs defeated Norwich Merchants 4-games-to-2
2000: Lakefield Chiefs defeated Belle River Canadiens 4-games-to-2
2014: Lakefield Chiefs defeated Essex 73's 4-games-to-none
2018: Lakefield Chiefs defeated Glanbrook Rangers 4-games-to-1

== OHA Cup Finals appearances ==
1978: Lakefield Chiefs defeated Exeter Hawks 4-games-to-3
1979: Lakefield Chiefs defeated St. George Dukes 4-games-to-2

== 2017–18 team staff ==
- President - Don Dunford
- General Manager - Tyler Revoy
- Head Coach - Jamie Arcand
- Assistant Coach - Shawn Dunbar
- Assistant Coach - Jason Hinze
- Assistant Coach - Nick O'Brien
- Trainer - Blair Nelson / Jared Ellis

== Notable alumni ==
- Kevin Evans
- Sean Hill
