= Uxbridge Bruins =

Canadian junior ice hockey team

- City: Uxbridge, Ontario
- League: Provincial Junior Hockey League
- Conference: East
- Division: Orr
- Founded: 1976
- Home arena: Uxbridge Arena and Recreation Centre
- Colours: Black, Yellow, and White
- General manager: Trevor Cox (2024)
- Head coach: Dan West
- Affiliates: North Durham Warriors, Central Ontario Wolves, Brock Wild

Championships
- League champions: 1991, 1996, 2001, 2002, 2005, 2009, 2019, 2026

The Uxbridge Bruins are a Junior ice hockey team based in Uxbridge, Ontario, Canada. They play in the PJHL Provincial Junior Hockey League.

== History ==
The Uxbridge Bruins joined the Central Ontario Junior C Hockey League in 1975. The Bruins entered into an era where the league was made very competitive by future Junior "A" teams like the Bowmanville Eagles and Lindsay Muskies. For the 2016-17 season the COJCHL became the Orr Division of the Provincial Junior Hockey League.

The early years were not kind to the Bruins, but the tide began to turn in the 1990s.

The 1990-91 season saw the Bruins finish with a record of twenty-two wins, eleven losses, and three ties. That record clinched them their first regular season crown. The Bruins went on to win their first ever league championship.

In 1995-96, the Bruins once again came to life. With a record of twenty-nine wins, eight losses, three ties, and two overtime losses, Uxbridge found themselves on top of the pile again. The Bruins went on to win their second league championship, but again failed to make a dent in provincials. A season later, the Bruins had an even better record but failed to win their league.

The 2001-02 season proved to be a special one. The Uxbridge Bruins won the regular season crown with thirty-one wins and went on to win the league championship. Their third championship launched them deep into the All-Ontario playoffs for the Clarence Schmalz Cup. They made it to the provincial finals just to find one team in their path: the Great Lakes Junior C Hockey League's Essex 73's. The series was long and was fought hard, as well it went the distance. The Bruins, one game away from their first Clarence Schmalz Cup, just could not do it in Game 7 losing 2-1 and the series 4-games-to-3.

In 2004-05, the Bruins won the regular season crown and their fourth league championship. Upon reaching the provincial championship they met the Empire B Junior C Hockey League's Amherstview Jets in the All-Ontario quarter-final. The Bruins made quick work of them, sweeping them 4-games-to-none. In the provincial semi-final, the Bruins drew the Niagara & District Junior C Hockey League's Grimsby Peach Kings. The Peach Kings proved to be a dominant opponent and went on to win the series 4-games-to-1 and then later the Clarence Schmalz Cup as provincial champions.

The Bruins finished the 2005-06 season in third place. In the league semi-final, the Bruins challenged the second seeded Little Britain Merchants. The series went the distance, with Uxbridge coming out on top in Game 7 and winning the series 4-games-to-3. In the league finals, the Bruins met the first seeded Port Perry Mojacks. The Mojacks defeated Uxbridge 4-games-to-2.

The 2006-07 was somewhat dismal for the Uxbridge Bruins. After finishing in fourth place, the Bruins were forced to play a quarter-final series against the last place Georgina Ice. The Bruins squeaked out of that series with a 3-games-to-2 series win. In the league semi-final, the Bruins then ran into the first seeded Lakefield Chiefs. The Chiefs made quick work of the Bruins, sweeping them 4-games-to-none.

== Season-by-season results ==
Season	GP	W	L	T	OTL	GF	GA	P	Results	Playoffs
1987-88	32	10	21	1	-	162	188	21	9th COJCHL	
1988-89	40	16	20	4	-	223	191	36	8th COJCHL	
1989-90	36	17	15	4	-	184	162	38	3rd COJCHL	
1990-91	36	22	11	3	-	188	142	47	1st COJCHL	Won League, lost CSC SF
1991-92	34	8	24	1	1	137	218	18	5th COJCHL	
1992-93	40	18	17	2	3	238	203	41	5th COJCHL	
1993-94	30	17	10	3	0	137	119	37	3rd COJCHL	
1994-95	36	19	15	1	1	181	161	40	4th COJCHL	
1995-96	42	29	8	3	2	241	156	63	1st COJCHL	Won League, lost CSC QF
1996-97	40	31	6	2	1	254	134	65	1st COJCHL	
1997-98	40	17	20	1	2	187	196	37	3rd COJCHL	
1998-99	40	28	12	0	0	192	117	56	2nd COJCHL	Won semi-final 4-3 (Ice); Lost final 2-4 (Chiefs)
1999-00	40	19	17	4	0	186	147	42	4th COJCHL	Lost semi-final 0-4 (Chiefs)
2000-01	40	25	12	2	1	211	134	53	3rd COJCHL	Won semi-final 4-2 (Ice); Won League 4-2 (Chiefs); Won CSC quarter-final 4-2 (Raiders); Lost CSC semi-final 1-4 (Riverhawks)
2001-02	42	31	5	3	3	240	115	68	1st COJCHL	Won semi-final 4-0 (Ice); Won League 4-2 (Chiefs); Won CSC quarter-final 4-0 (Flyers); Won CSC semi-final 4-1 (Bulldogs); Lost CSC Final 3-4 (73's)
2002-03	38	21	12	3	2	159	134	47	2nd COJCHL	Lost semi-final 2-4 (Chiefs)
2003-04	38	20	8	8	2	168	130	50	3rd COJCHL	Lost semi-final 3-4 (Chiefs)
2004-05	40	27	7	4	2	150	86	60	1st COJCHL	Won semi-final 4-3 (Merchants); Won League 4-2 (Mojacks); Won CSC quarter-final 4-0 (Jets); Lost CSC semi-final 1-4 (Peach Kings)
2005-06	42	23	16	0	3	169	121	49	3rd COJCHL	Won semi-final 4-3 (Merchants); Lost final 2-4 (Mojacks)
2006-07	40	19	17	1	3	180	179	42	4th COJCHL	Won quarter-final 3-2 (Ice); Lost semi-final 0-4 (Chiefs)
2007-08	40	16	17	2	5	109	125	39	4th COJCHL	Won quarter-final 3-1 (Mojacks); Lost semi-final 0-4 (Chiefs)
2008-09	40	24	9	7	0	193	137	55	1st COJCHL	Won semi-final 4-1 (Merchants); Won League 4-0 (Chiefs); Lost CSC quarter-final 2-4 (Jets)
2009-10	40	31	7	-	2	165	118	64	1st COJCHL	Won semi-final 4-2 (Chiefs); Lost final 1-4 (Merchants)
2010-11	40	28	11	-	1	198	145	57	1st COJCHL	Won semi-final 4-0 (Merchants); Lost final 3-4 (Mojacks)
2011-12	40	16	20	-	4	175	205	36	5th COJCHL	Lost quarter-final 0-3 (Eagles)
2012-13	40	30	7	-	3	164	96	63	1st COJCHL	Won semi-final 4-0 (Mojacks); Lost final 1-4 (Chiefs)
2013-14	40	21	14	-	5	138	146	47	3rd COJCHL	Won semi-final 4-3 (Eagles); Lost final 1-4 (Chiefs)
2014-15	42	30	9	-	3	168	103	63	1st COJCHL	Won semi-final 4-0 (Merchants); Lost final 0-4 (Eagles)
2015-16	42	23	12	2	5	154	115	53	2nd of 7 COJCHL	Quarter-final - BYE; Lost semi-final 0-4 - (Mojacks)
2016-17	42	15	25	2	-	130	156	32	5th of 7 Orr Division-PJHL	Won quarter-final 4-3 (Knights); Lost semi-finals 2-4 (Chiefs)
2017-18	41	24	15	0	2	159	124	50	4th of 7 Orr Division-PJHL	Quarter-finals bye Lost semi-final 1-4 (Mojacks)
2018-19	42	33	7	0	2	212	96	68	1st of 7 Orr Division-PJHL	Won semi-final 4-0 (Mojacks); Won League 4-1 (Knights); Lost East Conference final 0-4 (Raiders)
2019-20	42	18	22	1	1	178	187	38	5th of 7 Orr Division-PJHL	Won Prelim Rd 2-1 (Merchants); Lost semi-final 2-4 (Eagles)
2020-21	Season Lost due to COVID-19 pandemic									
2021-22	32	15	16	0	1	104	114	31	4th of 7 Orr Division-PJHL	Lost quarter-final 2-4 (Chiefs)
2022-23	42	27	9	5	0	154	120	59	2nd of 7 Orr Division-PJHL	Won quarter-final 4-0 (Lumberjacks); Won semi-final 4-2 (Merchants); Lost final 0-4 (Eagles)
2023-24	42	23	18	1	0	161	162	47	3rd of 7 Orr Division-PJHL	Quarter-final bye Lost semi-final 0-4 (Ice)
2024-25	42	20	19	3	0	157	150	43	4th of 7 Orr Div; 9th of 15 East Conf; 35th of 63-PJHL	Lost quarter-final 3-4 (Lumberjacks)
2025-26	42	35	6	0	1	206	72	71	1st of 7 Orr Div; 1st of 14 East Conf; 2nd of 61-PJHL	Won quarter-final 4-0 (Caledon Golden Hawks); Won Div Semifinal 4-1 (Lumberjacks); Won Div Finals 4-2 (Eagles); Lost East Conf 2-4 (Huskies)

== Schmalz Cup Finals appearances ==
2002: Essex 73's defeated Uxbridge Bruins 4-games-to-3
