= Georgina Ice =

Canadian junior ice hockey team

- City: Keswick, Ontario
- League: Provincial Junior Hockey League
- Conference: East
- Division: Orr
- Founded: 1994
- Home arena: Georgina Ice Palace
- Colours: Royal Blue, White
- President: Joseph Cornacchia
- Affiliate: None

Championships
- League champions: 2003 and 2008

The Georgina Ice are a Junior ice hockey team based in Keswick, Ontario, Canada. Starting with the 2016-17 season they play in the Provincial Junior Hockey League. Their prior league, the Central Ontario Junior C Hockey League of the Ontario Hockey Association amalgamated with the other Southern Ontario junior hockey leagues. It then became the Orr Division in the East conference.

== History ==
The Ice were founded in 1994. They have always played in the Central "C" league until the re-organization of junior "C" hockey in 2016-17 when the Ice became part of the Provincial Junior Hockey League (PJHL). The Ice play most of their home games at the Georgina Ice Palace in Keswick. Each year they play a handful of games in Sutton at the Sutton Arena.

The Georgina Ice have developed many young junior players that have risen to higher levels of hockey including Junior, College and professional leagues including the National Hockey League. The inaugural team saw players such as Jason Robinson, Jimmy Wilson and Todd Hamblin go on to play for the Stouffville Spirit of the Ontario Provincial Junior A Hockey League.

In the second year the franchise was affiliated with Stouffville Spirit over the course of their 13-year existence the Ice have also been affiliated with the 2002–03 Dudley Hewitt Cup and Royal Bank Cup winning Aurora Tigers. The Ice reformed their affiliation with the Newmarket Hurricanes in 2006.

Trevor Sedore

In 2002–03 The Ice made the ultimate journey advancing to the Clarence Schmalz Cup. The Ice lost the series in 4 games to the Grimsby Peach Kings. Grimsby was making their first of two consecutive runs at the Ontario Championship.

2006 saw Ice alumnus David McIntyre drafted by the Dallas Stars in the 5th round of the NHL Entry Draft. Kyle Orr, also an Ice alumnus signed a pro contract with the Arizona Sundogs of the Central Hockey League. Justin Soryal, who played for the Ice in 2003–04, now plays for the Connecticut Whale in the American Hockey League.

In 2004, The Ice retired Jersey No. 94 in honor of all time Ice leading scorer Trevor Sedore who finished his junior career after 240 games with 179 goals and 172 assists for 351 points. Sedore was named league MVP 3 times in 7 seasons.

Steve Sedore

Also in 2004 the Georgina Ice honored longtime head coach Steve Sedore for his 25 years of coaching. He has been a constant fixture with the Ice over their 13 years. He was the head coach in the first season and has held various positions since. Steve is the longest serving and winningest coach in Ice History and has held coaching positions with the Stouffville Spirit, Couchiching Terriers and the Newmarket Hurricanes. He has also been involved in minor hockey with Georgina and York Simcoe.

Aside from Steve the Ice have been led by Mike Sedore, Paul Sinclair and Peter Hughes. Mike returned to the Ice in 2006 after Pete stepped down to assume the assistant coaching role. Mike last served as head coach in 1995–96 taking over for Steve when he took on the head coaching duties with the Spirit.

Heading into the 2006–07 Season the Ice have compiled a regular season record of 236-204-30-18. Since entering the league in 1994 they have played regular season games against the Port Perry Mojacks, Uxbridge Bruins, Lakefield Chiefs and Little Britain Merchants all of which remain in the league today. The Bowmanville Eagles left the COJCHL in 1995 and the Bobcaygeon Bullets left shortly after. For a period of time The Central League also played crossover games with the Empire B Junior C League.

In 2008 The Ice took home the coveted Cougar beating the No. 1 ranked Lakefield Chiefs 4 games to none to capture their second COJCHL title.

In 2019-2020 notable changes came to the ICE program, namely new ownership under Joseph Cornacchia, former Head Coach and General Manager of the U18 AAA Markham Waxers and OJHL Markham Waxers. Joe was able to assemble a management group and coaching staff in Keswick that prioritized local players from Georgina and the York Simcoe Area. While immediate success on the ice took time, momentum off the ice was significant. The staff aimed to put together the best show in Keswick on Friday nights.

The 2020-2021 season had early promise with strong player signings and an increased buzz around town that the ICE were committed to putting a skilled team together. In the end, the puck never dropped as Covid-19 cancelled the season.

2021-2022 saw a new roster joining the club from the U18 AAA York Simcoe Express program. Player signings like Cameron McClachrie, Austin Paulmert and Justin Diliso showed enhanced confidence from the community in the ICE’s ability to develop players. One notable signing was 17 year old OHL Sarnia Sting drafted goaltender, Nicholas Surzycia. Nick chose to play the ’21-’22 season with the ICE where he posted a .935 save%, won the PJHL Rookie Of The Year Award and brought the ICE to the playoffs where they won their first playoff game in 11 seasons. As well as the won games Joe also built a new player dressing room; a state-of-the-art change room to show his commitment to the players and community. To this day, the room is the crown jewel to the ICE and it’s shared with Upper York Admirals, Georgina Blaze and Georgina Golden Hawks teams.

2022-2023 was Head Coach/General Manager Darren Price’s sophomore season behind the bench. Price quickly announced big player signings such as Captain, Mike McCullough, Jack Mayo and local AAA all-star, Ronnie Wiersema who went on the win PJHL Rookie Of The Year with 42 PTS and 72 PIMS. The ’22-’23 season also saw the return of Steve Sedore as an Assistant, bringing many years of experience in the PJHL and OJHL. The ICE continued to see local confidence with the program as another Sarnia Sting OHL drafted player, 16 year old ‘AP’ Michael Denney signed with the team. Denney assisted the ICE in defeating the North Kawartha Knights in the first round, 4 games to 1. The ICE went on to lose 4 straight games to the mighty, Clarington Eagles who went on to appear in the Schmalz Cup Finals. Friday night home games for the ICE have seen increased attendance, averaging over 600 people due to team success and an established social media presence online.

2023-2024 was a year of success as a club with great individual accolades as well. The ICE saw over 14,000 fans during their 21 home games, averaging over 660 fans per game. A vision Director of Hockey & Business Operations, Michael Cornacchia had in 2019 when taking over the club. On the ice, Georgina set a single-season club record for regular season wins with 30. In addition, Captain Mike McCullough set the ICE single season scoring record with 82 points. Georgina made the largest player acquisition in club history by trading for hometown forward Ryan Cutler from the OJHL Trenton Golden Hawks. Ryan's impact was significant recording 56 points in 26 regular season games and adding 24 points in 12 playoff games. Come playoffs, Georgina won two playoff rounds where they swept the Little Britain Merchants in the division quarter finals, then moved on to sweep the Uxbridge Bruins in the division semi-finals and once again met the Clarington Eagles in the East Orr division finals. In Game 1 the Eagles won 6-5. In Game 2 the Eagles won 3-0. In Game 3 the Eagles won 4-2 and in Game 4 the Eagles won 2-0.

2024-2025 saw more regular season success as the club experienced a 20-0-0-1 winning streak. Co-Captains Ronnie Wiersema and Austin Paulmert led the club to the Division Finals where the post season came to an abrupt end as the Eagles, for the second year in a row, swept the ICE in four games in the East Orr Division Finals. It was an exciting series nonetheless, with all four games being decided by just one goal. Many had Georgina heavily favored, as the ICE boasted 14 players with over 20 regular-season points, including Kirou (67), Ursomarzo (55), Lonsdale (55), McKee (46), and Paulmert (55). However, it was Clarington’s coaching that ultimately proved to be the ICE’s downfall.

In the wake of the defeat, the ICE parted ways with GM and Head Coach Darren Price, along with Assistant Coaches Terry O’Brien and Steve Sedore, seeking a fresh perspective. We thank them for their contributions during their time with the team.

2025-2026 The ICE made a confident move by naming Jon Perrin as the new Head Coach. Perrin, with his experience coaching the Lindsay Muskies in the OJHL and his extensive involvement in Lindsay Minor Hockey, was seen as the right fit for the role. He appointed Dave Runge and Joey Abbott as Assistant Coaches, bringing a mix of expertise and fresh leadership to the team.

With a group of returning players, combined with experienced coaches and a proven management team, expectations for the 2025-2026 regular season remained high. The ICE have their sights set on another division final and the Cougar Cup.

The ICE also announced that the rookie Sebastien Ferris recorded 75 points in 37 regular-season games. Additionally, goalie Adien Lindsay completed his sophomore season, posting a 13-3 record with a 2.03 GAA and a .939 save percentage.

== Captains ==
- 2025-2026: Co-Captains, Austin Paulmert & Seth Kirou
- 2024-2025: Co-Captains, Ronnie Wiersma & Austin Paulmert
- 2023-2024: Mike McCullough
- 2022-2023: Mike McCullough
- 2021-2022: Blake Gowan
- 2020-2021: No Captain - Season lost to Covid
- 2019-2020: Jesse King-Norris
- 2018-2019: Josh Lemmon
- 2017-2018: Justin Wain
- 2016-2017: Justin Wain
- 2015-2016: Bradley Boudreau
- 2014-2015: Brett Theissen
- 2013-2014: Luke Vanderkooy
- 2012-2013: Scott Sandercock
- 2011-2012: Scott Sedore
- 2010-2011: Braedon Collins
- 2009-2010: Brendan Berryman
- 2008-2009: Brock Van Der Gulik
- 2007-2008: Andrew Lamoureux

== Season-by-season results ==
Season	GP	W	L	T	OTL	GF	GA	P	Results	Playoffs
1994–95	36	19	13	2	2	167	154	42	3rd COJCHL	Lost semi-final
1995–96	42	16	23	2	1	174	199	42	4th COJCHL	Lost semi-final
1996–97	40	19	14	3	4	183	164	45	3rd COJCHL	
1997–98	40	15	22	3	0	177	203	33	5th COJCHL	
1998–99	40	22	14	2	2	185	130	48	3rd COJCHL	Lost semi-final 3-4 (Bruins)
1999–00	40	20	16	2	2	172	167	44	3rd COJCHL	Won semi-final 4-0 (Mojacks); Lost final 0-4 (Chiefs)
2000–01	40	27	12	1	0	195	143	55	2nd COJCHL	Lost semi-final 2-4 (Bruins)
2001–02	42	24	15	3	0	193	152	51	2nd COJCHL	Lost semi-final 0-4 (Bruins)
2002–03	38	22	10	6	0	162	137	50	1st COJCHL	Won semi-final 4-3 (Mojacks); Won League 4-3 (Chiefs); Won CSC quarter-final 4-1 (Rebels); Won CSC semi-final 4-1 (Barons); Lost CSC Final 0-4 (Peach Kings)
2003–04	38	22	10	4	2	170	134	50	1st COJCHL	Won semi-final 4-2 (Mojacks); Lost final 3-4 (Chiefs)
2004–05	40	10	26	1	3	116	181	24	5th COJCHL	Lost quarter-final 0-3 (Merchants)
2005–06	42	10	29	1	2	133	230	23	5th COJCHL	Lost quarter-final 0-3 (Chiefs)
2006-07	40	10	25	4	1	158	213	25	5th COJCHL	Lost quarter-final 2-3 (Bruins)
2007-08	40	24	13	3	0	168	127	51	2nd COJCHL	Won semi-final 4-1 (Merchants); Won League 4-0 (Chiefs); Lost CSC quarter-final 3-4 (Chiefs)
2008-09	40	15	20	4	1	183	197	35	4th COJCHL	Lost quarter-final 1-3 (Merchants)
2009-10	40	19	16	-	5	170	175	43	4th COJCHL	Lost quarter-final 0-3 (Chiefs)
2010-11	40	19	17	-	4	163	156	42	3rd COJCHL	Lost semi-final 3-4 (Mojacks)
2011-12	40	14	24	-	2	141	183	30	6th COJCHL	Lost semi-final 1-4 (Chiefs)
2012-13	40	11	26	-	3	124	221	25	6th COJCHL	Lost quarter-final 1-3 (Eagles)
2013-14	40	8	28	-	4	95	211	20	6th COJCHL	DNQ
2014-15	42	8	32	-	2	113	246	18	6th COJCHL	DNQ
2015-16	42	0	40	1	1	71	288	2	7th of 7 COJCHL	DNQ
2016-17	42	3	39	0	-	115	280	6	7th of 7 Orr Div-PJHL	DNQ
2017-18	41	10	28	1	2	120	245	23	6th of 7 Orr Div-PJHL	Lost quarter-finals, 0-4 (Mojacks)
2018-19	41	9	30	2	-	109	247	20	7th of 7 Orr Div-PJHL	DNQ
2019-20	42	2	38	1	1	103	286	6	7th of 7 Orr Div-PJHL	DNQ
2020-21	Season Lost due to COVID-19 pandemic									
2021-22	32	8	23	0	1	68	133	17	7th of 7 Orr Div-PJHL	Lost quarter-final 1-4 (Merchants)
2022-23	40	22	15	3	0	144	141	47	4th of 7 Orr Div-PJHL	Won quarter-final 4-1 (Knights); Lost semi-final 0-4 (Eagles}
2023-24	42	30	12	0	0	220	118	60	2nd of 7 Orr Div-PJHL	Won quarter-final 4-0 (Merchants); Won semi-final 4-0 (Bruins); Lost final 0-4 (Eagles)
2024-25	42	34	5	2	1	235	113	71	2nd of 7 Orr Div; 2nd of 15 East Conf; 7th of 63 - PJHL	Won quarter-final 4-1 (Merchants); Won semi-final 4-0 (Cougars); Lost final 0-4 (Eagles)
2025-26	42	31	9	2	1	201	105	64	2nd of 7 Orr Div; 2nd of 14 East Conf; 8th of 61 - PJHL	Won quarter-final 4-0 (Cougars); Lost semi-final 3-4 (Eagles)

== Schmalz Cup Finals appearances ==
2003: Grimsby Peach Kings defeated Georgina Ice 4-games-to-0

== 2017–2018 Team Staff ==
- General Manager - Steve Sedore
- Assistant Manager -
- Head Coach - Steve Sedore
- Assistant Coach - Steve Knispel
- Assistant Coach - Mark Watson
- Assistant Coach -
- Trainer - Amy Collett
- Assistant Trainer -

== 2019–20 Team Staff ==
- President & General Manager - Joseph Cornacchia
- Director of Hockey & Business Operations - Michael Cornacchia
- Assistant General Manager - Padraig Kenny
- Head Coach - Mark Watson
- Assistant Coach - Scott Sandercock
- Equipment Manager - Brad Sedore
- Trainer - Donna Giancola

== 2020–21 Team Staff ==
- President - Joseph Cornacchia
- Director of Hockey & Business Operations - Michael Cornacchia
- General Manager - Paul Dossey
- Assistant General Manager/Asst. Coach - Padraig Kenny
- Head Coach - Mark Watson
- Assistant Coach - Scott Sandercock
- Equipment Manager - Brad Sedore
- Trainer - Donna Giancola

== 2021–22 Team Staff ==
- President - Joseph Cornacchia
- Director of Hockey & Business Operations - Michael Cornacchia
- Assistant General Manager - Padraig Kenny
- Head Coach - Darren Price
- Assistant Coach - Terry O'Brien
- Goalie Coach - Matt Kostiw
- Equipment Manager - Dave Mullett

== 2022–23 Team Staff ==
- President - Joseph Cornacchia
- Director of Hockey & Business Operations - Michael Cornacchia
- Advisor - Padraig Kenny
- Head Coach & General Manager - Darren Price
- Assistant Coach - Terry O'Brien
- Assistant Coach - Steve Sedore
- Goalie Coach - Matt Kostiw

== 2023–24 Team Staff ==
- President - Joseph Cornacchia
- Director of Hockey & Business Operations - Michael Cornacchia
- Advisor - Padraig Kenny
- Head Coach & General Manager - Darren Price
- Assistant Coach - Terry O'Brien
- Assistant Coach - Steve Sedore
- Goalie Coach - Matt Kostiw

== 2024–25 Team Staff ==
- President - Joseph Cornacchia
- Director of Hockey & Business Operations - Michael Cornacchia
- Director & Advisor - Padraig Kenny
- Director - Ryan Eccleshall
- Head Coach & General Manager - Darren Price
- Assistant Coach - Terry O'Brien
- Assistant Coach - Steve Sedore
- Goalie Coach - Matt Kostiw
- Equipment Manager - Brad Quigg
- Athletic Therapist - Ruth Y

== 2025–26 Team Staff ==
- President & General Manager - Joseph Cornacchia
- Director of Hockey & Business Operations - Michael Cornacchia
- Director & Advisor - Padraig Kenny
- Director - Ryan Eccleshall
- Head Coach - Jon Perrin
- Assistant Coach - Joey Abbott
- Assistant Coach - Thomas Lonsdale
- Equipment Manager - Brad Quigg
- Athletic Therapist - Ruth Y

== Home arena ==
The Georgina Ice Palace in Keswick has been the main home of the Georgina Ice since 1996–97 season. Prior to that the Ice played the bulk of their games at the Sutton Arena where they continue to play a handful of games each season.

The Ice Palace is located at 90 Wexford Drive just west of Woodbine Avenue in Keswick. It has a twin ice pad and also has a library, multi-use facility and a skatepark.

== Notable alumni ==
- David McIntyre - Dallas Star Draft Pick - Minnesota Wild - Colgate (NCAA DI)
- Sean Walker - Los Angeles Kings - Bowling Green State University (NCAA DI)
- Justin Soryal - New York Rangers
- Joel Hanley - Dallas Stars - UMASS (Amherst) (NCAA DI)
- Brad Fogal - Adrian College (NCAA DIII) - ECHL - WPHL - AHL
- Taylor McCloy - Adrian College (NCAA DIII) - Norfolk Admirals - ECHL - SPHL
- Nicholas Surzycia - Goaltender, Sarnia Sting (O.H.L.)
- Jonathan Lush - Misericordia University (NCAA DIII) -
