= Little Britain Merchants =

Canadian junior ice hockey team

- City: Little Britain, Ontario
- League: Provincial Junior Hockey League
- Conference: East
- Division: Orr
- Founded: 1978
- Home arena: Little Britain Community Centre
- Colours: Red and White
- Head coach: Mathew Muir
- Affiliate: Lindsay Muskies

Championships
- League champions: 1998, 2010

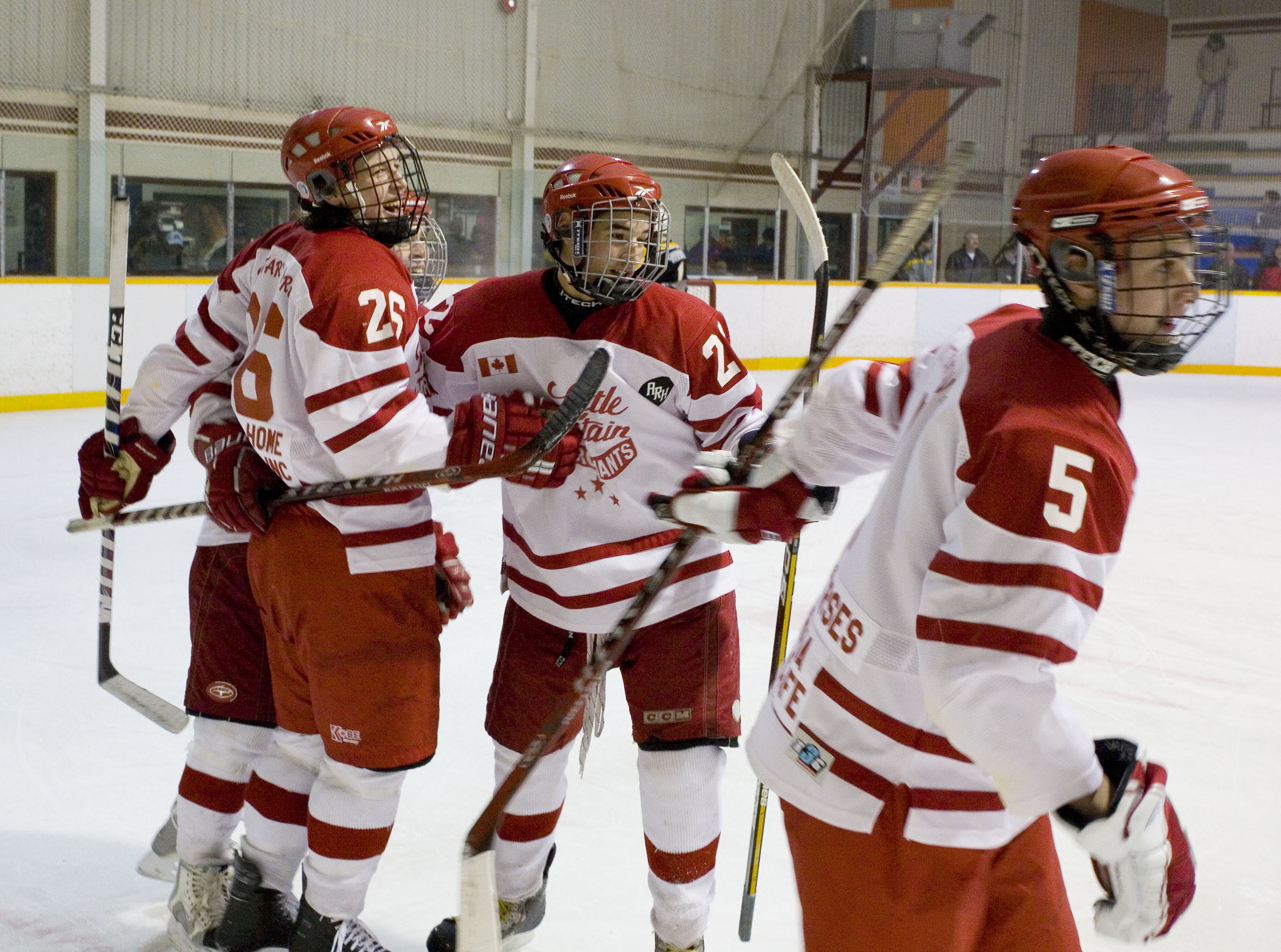
Little Britain Merchants players celebrate the third goal of the game in 2011

The Little Britain Merchants are a junior C ice hockey team based in Little Britain, Ontario, Canada. They played in the Central Ontario Junior C Hockey League of the Ontario Hockey Association until the 2016–17 season when the league became the Orr Division of the Provincial Junior Hockey League.

== History ==
The Little Britain Merchants were founded in 1978 as members of the Southern Counties Junior D Hockey League.

In 1984, the Merchants move to the Central Lakeshore Junior C Hockey League. Two year later, the league merged with the Quinte-St. Lawrence Junior C Hockey League and formed the Central Ontario Junior C Hockey League. The expansion of the Merchants was to fill the void left by the folding of the Stouffville Clippers. The Merchants advanced to the Central Lakeshore Final that season where they would be swept by the Bowmanville Eagles who went on to the Clarence Schmalz Cup semifinals.

In the 1997–98 season, the Merchants finished first overall in the Central Ontario league regular season with 27 wins in 40 games. The Merchants won their first league championship that season and advanced to the Clarence Schmalz Cup semifinals where they were defeated by the eventual Schmalz Cup Champions Glanbrook Rangers of the Niagara District League.

The Merchants finished the 2005–06 regular season in second place overall. In the league semi-final, the Merchants drew the third seeded Uxbridge Bruins where the series went the full seven games with the Bruins taking the series 4-games-to-3. The 2006–07 regular season ended with the Merchants finishing in third place overall. Their semi-final opponent was the second seeded Port Perry Mojacks, which again went to a game seven before the Merchants were elimated.

Little Britain won their second league championship in 2009–10 when they upset the defending champion Uxbridge Bruins. The Merchants advanced to the Clarence Schmalz Cup quarterfinals against the Empire B champion Napanee Raiders. The series featured each team winning at home with the Raiders advancing in seven games.

== Season-by-season results ==
Season	GP	W	L	T	OTL	GF	GA	Pts	Results	Playoffs
1987–88	32	15	15	2	—	148	162	32	5th COJCHL	
1988–89	40	20	14	6	—	181	161	46	5th COJCHL	
1989–90	36	9	23	4	—	163	218	22	7th COJCHL	
1990–91	36	18	17	1	—	192	156	37	5th COJCHL	
1991–92	34	20	10	0	4	196	164	44	2nd COJCHL	
1992–93	40	25	12	2	1	240	178	53	1st COJCHL	
1993–94	30	10	16	3	1	122	136	24	5th COJCHL	
1994–95	36	13	20	1	2	146	163	29	6th COJCHL	
1995–96	42	29	11	1	1	207	159	60	3rd COJCHL	
1996–97	40	19	16	5	0	177	172	43	4th COJCHL	
1997–98	40	27	8	4	1	208	158	59	1st COJCHL	Won League; Won CSC semi-final (Rebels); Lost CSC semi-final 1-4 (Rangers)
1998–99	40	19	19	2	0	181	213	41	4th COJCHL	Lost semi-final 0-4 (Chiefs)
1999–00	40	14	23	1	2	150	231	31	5th COJCHL	DNQ
2000–01	40	12	26	1	1	161	202	27	5th COJCHL	DNQ
2001–02	42	12	24	2	4	147	204	30	5th COJCHL	DNQ
2002–03	38	12	21	3	2	131	177	29	5th COJCHL	Lost quarter-final 0-2 (Mojacks)
2003–04	38	10	20	5	3	129	174	28	4th COJCHL	Lost quarter-final 0-2 (Mojacks)
2004–05	40	17	21	1	1	123	161	36	4th COJCHL	Won quarter-final 3-0 (Ice); Lost semi-final 3-4 (Bruins)
2005–06	42	28	13	1	0	191	144	57	2nd COJCHL	Lost semi-final 3-4 (Bruins)
2006–07	40	19	12	6	3	175	154	47	3rd COJCHL	Lost semi-final 3-4 (Mojacks)
2007–08	40	20	14	4	2	137	152	46	3rd COJCHL	Lost semi-final 1-4 (Ice)
2008–09	40	9	27	3	1	159	219	22	5th COJCHL	Won quarter-final 3-1 (Ice); Lost semi-final 1-4 (Bruins)
2009–10	40	21	17	—	2	153	158	44	3rd COJCHL	Won semi-final 4-0 (Mojacks); Won League 4-1 (Bruins); Lost CSC quarter-final 3-4 (Raiders)
2010–11	40	16	20	—	4	143	174	36	4th COJCHL	Won quarter-final 3-2 (Chiefs); Lost semi-final 0-4 (Bruins)
2011–12	40	24	13	—	3	158	146	51	2nd COJCHL	Lost semi-final 1-4 (Chiefs)
2012–13	40	13	24	—	3	113	156	29	5th COJCHL	Lost quarter-final 1-3 (Mojacks)
2013–14	40	13	22	—	5	122	176	31	5th COJCHL	DNQ
2014–15	42	21	17	—	4	175	157	46	5th COJCHL	Won Play-in 3–1 (Mojacks); Lost semi-final 0–4 (Bruins)
2015–16	42	25	15	—	2	192	142	52	3rd of 7, COJCHL	Lost quarter-final 0–4 (Chiefs)
2016–17	42	13	28	1	—	140	193	27	6th of 7 Orr Division-PJHL	Lost quarter-final 0–4 (Eagles)
2017–18	40	0	38	1	1	62	268	2	7th of 7 Orr Division-PJHL	Did not finish season
2018–19	42	13	24	2	3	163	184	31	6th of 7 Orr Division-PJHL	DNQ
2019–20	42	21	18	1	2	144	149	45	4th of 7 Orr Division-PJHL	Lost Preliminary Round 1-2 (Bruins)
2020-21	Season Lost due to COVID-19 pandemic									
2021–22	32	25	6	0	1	146	85	51	2nd of 7 Orr Division-PJHL	Won quarter-final 4-1 (Ice); Won semi-final 4-2 (Bruins); Lost final 0-4 (Eagles)
2022–23	42	23	12	6	1	142	119	53	3rd of 7 Orr Division-PJHL	quarter-final - bye Lost semi-final 2-4 (Bruins)
2023–24	42	12	26	4	0	113	188	28	6th of 7 Orr Division-PJHL	Lost quarter-final 0-4 (Ice)
2024–25	42	14	27	0	1	105	184	29	6th of 7 Orr Div; 11th of 15 East Conf; 46th of 63-PJHL	Lost quarter-final 1-4 (Ice)
2025–26	42	16	24	2	0	119	149	34	5th of 7 Orr Div; 10th of 14 East Conf; 44th of 61-PJHL	Lost quarter-final 0-4 (Lumberjacks)
