= Clarence Schmalz Cup =

Canadian junior ice hockey trophy

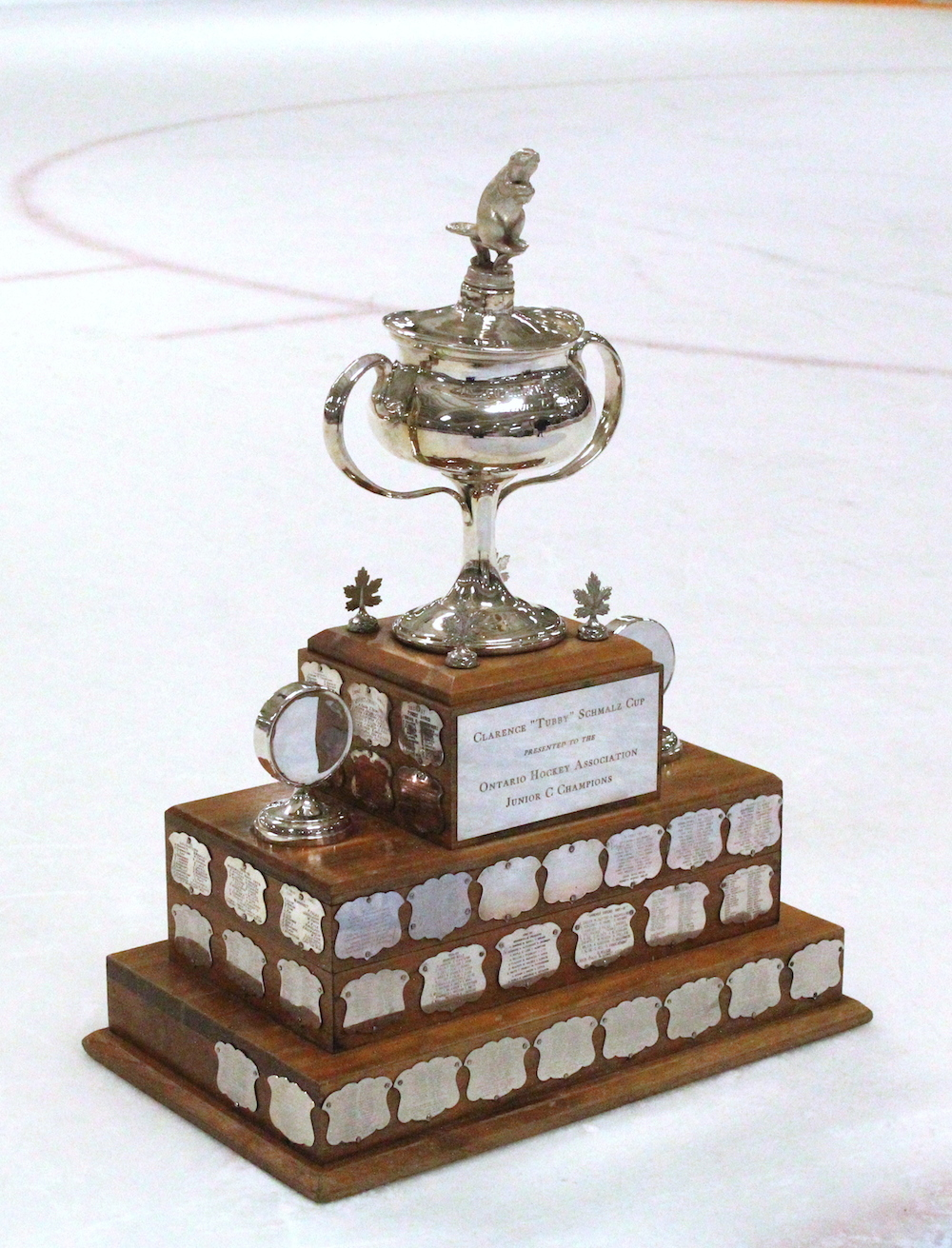
- Sport: Ice hockey
- Awarded for: Junior C champion of the Ontario Hockey Association

History
- First award: 1938
- First winner: Orangeville
- Most wins: Essex 73's (7 titles)
- Most recent: Fergus Whalers (2025–26)

The Clarence Schmalz Cup is the Ontario Hockey Association's Junior "C" ice hockey championship and championship trophy. The champions of the Provincial Junior Hockey League (PJHL) are awarded the Cup. The PJHL was formed in 2016 from the former eight provincial leagues that previously competed in a tournament, commonly called the All-Ontario Championships, to determine the winner of the Cup.

== Tubby Schmalz ==
The trophy was named in honour of Clarence "Tubby" Schmalz, an administrator from Walkerton, Ontario. He served as the Ontario Hockey Association president from 1969 to 1972. In 1974, the Major Junior A program began operating independently of the association as the Ontario Major Junior Hockey League; Schmalz became the league's first commissioner, a post he held until 1978. He served as vice-chairman of the Canadian Amateur Hockey Association from 1979 to 1981, and as chairman in 1981. The association renamed the OHA Junior C Cup in his memory in 1982, then collaborated with Schmalz's family in the creation of a commemorative trophy case in the lobby of the Walkerton Community Centre.

== Competing leagues ==
- Provincial Junior Hockey League (PJHL) 2016 to Present

=== Former competing leagues ===
- Central Ontario Junior C Hockey League (COJCHL) 1986-2016
  - formerly Central Lakeshore Junior C Hockey League (CLJHL) 1965-1986
  - formerly Quinte-St. Lawrence Junior C Hockey League (QSLJHL) 1965-1986
- Empire B Junior C Hockey League (EBJCHL) 1996-2016
  - formerly Eastern Ontario Junior C Hockey League (EOJCHL) 1989-1996
- Georgian Mid-Ontario Junior C Hockey League (GMOHL) 1994-2016
  - formerly Georgian Bay Junior C Hockey League (GBJCHL) 1970-1994
  - formerly Mid-Ontario Junior C Hockey League (MOJCHL) 1976-1994
  - formerly Central Junior C Hockey League (CJCHL GMO) 1973-1976
- Great Lakes Junior C Hockey League (GLJHL) 1970-2016
  - formerly Border Cities Junior Hockey League (BCJHL) 1968-1970
  - formerly Bluewater Junior C Hockey League (BJCHL) 1964-1968
- Intercounty Junior C Hockey League (IJCHL) 1966-1970
- Midwestern Junior C Hockey League (MWJCHL) 2013-2016
- Niagara & District Junior C Hockey League (NJCHL) 1974-2016
- Southern Ontario Junior Hockey League (SOJHL) 2012-2016
- Suburban Junior C Hockey League (SJCHL) 1961-1970
- Western Ontario Junior C Hockey League (WJCHL) 1988-2016
  - formerly Grey-Bruce Junior C Hockey League (GBJCHL) 1980-1988
  - formerly Central Junior C Hockey League (CJCHL Western) 1967-1980
  - formerly Western Junior C Hockey League (IntJCHL) 1966-1970

== Clarence Schmalz Cup champions ==
OHA Junior C champions
Year	Champion	Finalist	Semifinalists
1938	Orangeville	Aurora Bears	Lindsay, Simcoe
1939	Aurora Bears	Milton Bricktowners	Lindsay, New Hamburg
1940	Grimsby Peach Kings	Markham Jets	Bolton, Sundridge
1941	Markham Jets	Bolton	Parry Sound, Thorold
1942	Milton Bricks Tigers	Preston	Parry Sound
1943–1945 — suspended due to World War II
1946	Whitby	Port Colborne	Goderich, Stirling-Marmora
1947	Goderich	Stouffville	Gananoque, Orangeville
1948	Thorold	Gananoque	Aurora, Goderich
1949	Weston	Midland Red Wings	Lindsay, Stamford
1950	Collingwood Greenshirts	Aurora Black Hawks	Simcoe, Wallaceburg
1951	Collingwood Greenshirts	Port Hope Panthers	Milton, Paris
1952	Collingwood Greenshirts	Ingersoll Reems	Aurora, Dunnville
1953	Collingwood Greenshirts	Ingersoll Reems	Aurora, Thorold
1954	Midland Red Wings	Ingersoll Reems	Thorold, Whitby
1955	Ingersoll Reems	Collingwood Belaires
1956	Newmarket Smoke Rings (Sub)	Stamford	Goderich, Parry Sound
1957	Parry Sound Brunswicks	Brooklin Cyclones (Sub)	Welland-Crowland
1958	Newmarket Smoke Rings (Sub)	Fort Erie	Brooklin (Sub), Georgetown (Sub)
1959	Newmarket Smoke Rings (Sub)	Fort Erie	Harriston
1960	Whitby Hillcrests (Sub)	Stratford Braves	Picton, Wallaceburg
1961	Stratford Braves	Gananoque Islanders (CL)	Simcoe (Int), Warsaw (E)
1962	Elmira Sugar Kings (C)	Newmarket Redmen (Sub)	Dresden (BC), Napanee (E)
1963	New Hamburg Hahns (IC)	Napanee Red Wings (E)	Hespeler (C), Orangeville (Sub)
1964	Hespeler Shamrocks (C)	Lindsay Lions (CL)	Barrie (N), Wallaceburg
1965	Simcoe Blades (C)	Lindsay Merchants (CL)	Penetang, Point Edward
1966	Parry Sound Brunswicks (GB)	New Hamburg Hahns (C)	Napanee (QSL), Port Huron
1967	New Hamburg Hahns (W)	Aurora Tigers (Sub)	Exeter (BW), Napanee (QSL)
1968	Georgetown Raiders (Sub)	New Hamburg Hahns (W)	Huntsville (GB), Paris (IC)
1969	Woodstock Navy-Vets (IC)	Oakville Blades (Sub)	New Hamburg (W), Parry Sound (GB)
1970	Newmarket Redmen (Sub)	Hespeler Shamrocks (W)	Huntsville (GB), Leamington (BW)
1971	Dresden Jr. Kings (GL)	Bowmanville Eagles (CL)	Huntsville (GB), Hanover (CW)
1972	Leamington Flyers (GL)	Cobourg Cougars (CL)	Bracebridge (GB), Gananoque (QSL)
1973	Caledonia Corvairs (CW)	Lindsay Mercurys (CL)	Gananoque (QSL), Leamington (GL)
1974	Cobourg Cougars (CL)	Simcoe Jets (CW)	Bradford (MO), Leamington (GL)
1975	Essex 73's (GL)	Lindsay Muskies (CL)	Dunnville (ND), New Hamburg (CW)
1976	Dunnville Terriers (ND)	Essex 73's (GL)	Clinton (CW), Cobourg (CL)
1977	Essex 73's (GL)	Bowmanville Eagles (CL)	Alliston (MO), Listowel (CW)
1978	Essex 73's (GL)	Bowmanville Eagles (CL)	Alliston (MO), Flamborough (ND)
1979	Bowmanville Eagles (CL)	Kincardine Kinucks (CW)	Leamington (GL), Penetang (GB)
1980	Leamington Flyers (GL)	Bradford Blues (MO)	Flamborough (ND), Gananoque (QSL)
1981	Bowmanville Eagles (C)	Essex 73's (GL)	Gravenhurst (GB), Woodstock (ND)
1982	Flamborough Colts (ND)	Bowmanville Eagles (C)	3rd Penetang (GB), 4th Leamington (GL)
1983	Dunnville Terriers (ND)	Lindsay Muskies (C)	Leamington (GL), Penetang (GB)
1984	Penetang Kings (GB)	Woodstock Navy-Vets (ND)	Bowmanville (C), Dresden (GL)
1985	Belle River Canadiens (GL)	Midland Centennials (GB)	Bowmanville (C), Stoney Creek (ND)
1986	Norwich Merchants (C)	Bradford Blues (MO)	Essex (GL), Lakefield (C)
1987	Lakefield Chiefs (C)	Norwich Merchants (ND)	Bradford (MO), Hanover (W)
1988	Mooretown Flags (GL)	Port Perry Mojacks (C)	Hanover (W), Stoney Creek (ND)
1989	Bradford Bulls (MO)	Hanover Barons (W)	Belle River (GL), Lakefield (C)
1990	Orangeville Crushers (MO)	Belle River Canadiens (GL)	Napanee (EO), Parry Sound (GB)
1991	Hanover Barons (W)	Orangeville Crushers (MO)	Belle River (GL), Uxbridge (C)
1992	Belle River Canadiens (GL)	Stayner Siskins (MO)	Dundas (ND), Port Perry (C)
1993	Napanee Raiders (EB)	Hanover Barons (W)	Dundas (ND), Orangeville (MO)
1994	Belle River Canadiens (GL)	Rockton Real McCoys (ND)	Bowmanville (C), Mount Forest (W)
1995	Belle River Canadiens (GL)	Bowmanville Eagles (C)	Mount Forest (W), Woodstock (ND)
1996	Paris Mounties (ND)	Napanee Raiders (EB)	Belle River (GL), Mount Forest (W)
1997	Glanbrook Rangers (ND)	Belle River Canadiens (GL)	Kincardine (W), Lakefield (C)
1998	Glanbrook Rangers (ND)	Kincardine Bulldogs (W)	Essex (GL), Little Britain (C)
1999	Glanbrook Rangers (ND)	Wallaceburg Lakers (GL)	Kincardine (W), Lakefield (C)
2000	Lakefield Chiefs (C)	Belle River Canadiens (GL)	Chippawa (ND), Kincardine (W)
2001	Chippawa Riverhawks (ND)	Belle River Canadiens (GL)	Hanover (W), Uxbridge (C)
2002	Essex 73's (GL)	Uxbridge Bruins (C)	Kincardine (W), Woodstock (ND)
2003	Grimsby Peach Kings (ND)	Georgina Ice (C)	Essex (GL), Hanover (W)
2004	Grimsby Peach Kings (ND)	Wingham Ironmen (W)	Dresden (GL), Lakefield (C)
2005	Essex 73's (GL)	Grimsby Peach Kings (ND)	Uxbridge (C), Wingham (W)
2006	Penetang Kings (GMO)	Essex 73's (GL)	Port Perry (C), Simcoe (ND)
2007	Penetang Kings (GMO)	Essex 73's (GL)	Grimsby (ND), Lakefield (C)
2008	Alliston Hornets (GMO)	Essex 73's (GL)	Grimsby (ND), Napanee (EB)
2009	Essex 73's (GL)	Alliston Hornets (GMO)	Amherstview (EB), Norwich (ND)
2010	Alliston Hornets (GMO)	Belle River Canadiens (GL)	Grimsby (ND), Napanee (EB)
2011	Grimsby Peach Kings (ND)	Alliston Hornets (GMO)	Belle River (GL), Picton (EB)
2012	Grimsby Peach Kings (ND)	Alliston Hornets (GMO)	Campbellford (EB), Essex (GL)
2013	Picton Pirates (EB)	Essex 73's (GL)	Alliston (GMO), Grimsby (ND)
2014	Lakefield Chiefs (C)	Essex 73's (GL)	Grimsby (ND), Wingham (W)
2015	Essex 73's (GL)	Port Hope Panthers (EB)	Alliston (GMO), Ayr (MW)
2016	Ayr Centennials (MW)	Port Hope Panthers (EB)	Alliston (GMO), Essex (GL)
Provincial Junior Hockey League champions
Year	Champion	Finalist	Semifinalists
2017	Ayr Centennials	Port Hope Panthers	Alliston, Essex
2018	Lakefield Chiefs	Glanbrook Rangers	Lambeth, Stayner
2019	Napanee Raiders	Grimsby Peach Kings	Alliston, Exeter
2020 and 2021 — cancelled due to COVID-19 pandemic.
2022	Lakeshore Canadiens	Clarington Eagles	Grimsby, Stayner
2023	Wellesley Applejacks	Clarington Eagles	Lakeshore, Stayner
2024	Lakeshore Canadiens	Clarington Eagles	Hanover, New Hamburg
2025	Hanover Barons	Essex 73's	Napanee, New Hamburg
2026	Fergus Whalers	Tavistock Braves	Lakeshore, Frankford

The Junior "C" Challenge Cup, given to the best Junior "C" team in the Ontario Hockey Federation along with the Schmalz Cup.

== Championship series ==
Bolded is winner of Clarence Schmalz Cup as PJHL and OHA champion.

Season	Eastern finalist	Western finalist	Series (best-of-7)	Scores
2000	**Lakefield Chiefs** (C)	Belle River Canadiens (GL)	4-2	**4-3**, **2-1** OT, **4-3**, 2-3 2OT, 0-3, **3-2**
2001	**Chippawa Riverhawks** (ND)	Belle River Canadiens (GL)	4-1	**2-1**, 1-2, **7-2**, **2-1**, **6-3**
2002	Uxbridge Bruins (C)	**Essex 73's** (GL)	3-4	**5-6**, **2-5**, 5-4 OT, 5-3, **0-4**, 4-3, **1-2**
2003	Georgina Ice (EB)	**Grimsby Peach Kings** (ND)	0-4	**3-8**, **2-5**, **2-4**, **1-5**
2004	**Grimsby Peach Kings** (ND)	Wingham Ironmen (W)	4-0	**5-2**, **3-2**, **4-1**, **7-1**
2005	Grimsby Peach Kings (ND)	**Essex 73's** (GL)	3-4	5-3, **1-3**, 10-3, **2-3**, 3-1, **2-5**, **0-5**
2006	**Penetang Kings** (GMO)	Essex 73's (GL)	4-1	**1-0**, **3-1**, 1-3, **2-0**, **1-0**
2007	**Penetang Kings** (GMO)	Essex 73's (GL)	4-1	3-4, **3-1**, **4-3** OT, **5-2**, **3-1**
2008	**Alliston Hornets** (GMO)	Essex 73's (GL)	4-3	**4-1**, **4-2**, 2-3, 2-4, **5-1**, 0-2, **3-2**
2009	Alliston Hornets (GMO)	**Essex 73's** (GL)	0-4	**2-4**, **2-3**, **0-6**, **0-7**
2010	**Alliston Hornets** (GMO)	Belle River Canadiens (GL)	4-2	2-5, **7-6** OT, **5-4** OT, 1-5, **7-3**, **4-3**
2011	Alliston Hornets (GMO)	**Grimsby Peach Kings** (ND)	1-4	2-1 OT, **3-4** 2OT, **2-3**, **4-6**, **1-3**
2012	Alliston Hornets (GMO)	**Grimsby Peach Kings** (ND)	1-4	**3-5**, **1-2** OT, 2-1 OT, **2-3**, **4-5** OT
2013	**Picton Pirates** (EB)	Essex 73's (GL)	4-1	**4-3** OT, 2-3, **3-1**, **6-3**, **3-2**
2014	**Lakefield Chiefs** (C)	Essex 73's (GL)	4-0	**5-0**, **5-1**, **4-3** OT, **6-2**
2015	Port Hope Panthers (EB)	**Essex 73's** (GL)	3-4	**0-2**, **1-2**, **3-4**, 4-0, 5-4, 4-1, **0-1**
2016	Port Hope Panthers (EB)	**Ayr Centennials** (MW)	0-4	**3-6**, **2-3**, **2-5**, **2-5**
Season	PJHL North/East champion	PJHL South/West champion	Series (best-of-7)	Scores
2017	Port Hope Panthers	**Ayr Centennials**	2-4	8-1, 4-1, **2-4**, **1-3**, **1-4**, **3-6**
2018	**Lakefield Chiefs**	Glanbrook Rangers	4-1	**2-1** OT, 2-3, **4-3** OT, **5-2**, **4-0**
2019	**Napanee Raiders**	Grimsby Peach Kings	4-1	**2-0**, 2-3, **3-1**, **4-1**, **3-1**
2020 and 2021 Championship cancelled due to COVID-19 pandemic
**Championship tournament**
Season	Champion	Finalist	Score	Location
2022	**Lakeshore Canadiens**	Clarington Eagles	3-2 OT	Guelph, Ontario
2023	**Wellesley Applejacks**	Clarington Eagles	3-2	Woodstock, Ontario
Season	PJHL South/West champion	PJHL North/East champion	Series (best-of-7)	Scores
2024	**Lakeshore Canadiens**	Clarington Eagles	4-1	0-1, **2-1**, **3-2**, **4-2**, **5-4**
2025	Essex 73's	**Hanover Barons**	0-4	**1-6**, **1-2**, **0-4**, **4-5** OT
2026	Tavistock Braves	**Fergus Whalers**	1-4	**1-2**OT, **3-2**OT, **4-7**, **5-6**, **3-4** OT

== Clarence Schmalz Cup tournament results ==
Year	Round robin	Standings	Consolation game	Championship game
1982; Bracebridge, ON	Penetang def. Leamington 5-3; Flamborough def. Bowmanville 7-3; Flamborough def. Penetang 7-5 OT; Bowmanville def. Leamington 6-1; Leamington def. Flamborough 5-3; Bowmanville def. Penetang 4-2	Flamborough (2-1); Bowmanville (2-1); Penetang (1-2); Leamington (1-2)	Penetang def. Leamington; 7-4	Flamborough def. Bowmanville; 7-1
Year	Round robin	Standings	Semifinal games	Championship game
2022; Guelph, ON	Stayner def. Clarington 3-0; Lakeshore def. Grimsby 3-2; Clarington def. Grimsby 2-1 OT; Lakeshore def. Stayner 5-1; Clarington def. Lakeshore 4-1; Stayner def. Grimsby 3-2 OT	Lakeshore (2-1); Stayner (2-1); Clarington (2-1); Grimsby (0-3)	Lakeshore def. Grimsby; 5-0; Clarington def. Stayner; 4-1	Lakeshore def. Clarington; 3-2 OT
2023; Woodstock, ON	Wellesley def. Clarington 7-5; Lakeshore def. Wellesley 4-1; Clarington def. Stayner 4-1; Stayner def. Lakeshore 4-2; Wellesley def. Stayner 5-3; Clarington def. Lakeshore 4-0	Wellesley (2-1); Clarington (2-1); Stayner (1-2); Lakeshore (1-2)	Wellesley def. Lakeshore; 3-2 OT; Clarington def. Stayner; 2-1	Wellesley def. Clarington; 3-2

== Most championships by team ==
7

- Essex 73's (2015, 2009, 2005, 2002, 1978, 1977, 1975)

6

- Lakeshore Canadiens (2024, 2022, 1995, 1994, 1992, 1985)

5

- Grimsby Peach Kings (2012, 2011, 2004, 2003, 1940)

4

- Collingwood Greenshirts (1953, 1952, 1951, 1950)
- Lakefield Chiefs (2018, 2014, 2000, 1987)
- Newmarket Redmen (1970, 1959, 1958, 1956)

3

- Glanbrook Rangers (1999, 1998, 1997)
- Penetang Kings (2007, 2006, 1984)

2

- Alliston Hornets (2008, 2010)
- Ayr Centennials (2017, 2016)
- Bowmanville Eagles (1981, 1979)
- Dunnville Terriers (1983, 1976)
- Hanover Barons (1991, 2025)
- Leamington Flyers (1980, 1972)
- Napanee Raiders (2019, 1993)
- New Hamburg Firebirds (1967, 1963)
- Orangeville Crushers (1990, 1938)
- Parry Sound Brunswicks (1957, 1966)
- Whitby Jr. Dunlops (1960, 1946)

== George S. Dudley Trophy Super "C" champions ==
This trophy was awarded during the 1970s to a new class of junior hockey known as Super "C". The teams that competed were deemed to be from centres too small for Junior "B" but yet too big for Junior "C". The cities that competed for it: Barrie, Woodstock, Kitchener, Owen Sound, and Brantford; struggled throughout that decade to find Junior "B" leagues that suited their needs. While waiting, these teams generally played "down" in the Junior "C" or "D" level and awaited the Super "C" playoffs. The class was disbanded by 1976 as the only teams eligible for the championship had found homes in Junior "B".

OHA Super C Champions
Year	Champion	Finalist	Semi-finalist(s)
1970	Barrie Colts	Woodstock Navy-Vets	Oakville Blades
1971	Woodstock Navy-Vets	Kitchener Ranger B's	London Gems
No competition in 1972
1973	Woodstock Navy-Vets	Kitchener Ranger B's
1974	Woodstock Navy-Vets	Owen Sound Salvagemen
1975	Woodstock Navy-Vets	Owen Sound Salvagemen	Brantford Gunners
1976	Woodstock Navy-Vets	Brantford Penguins
