= Clarington Eagles =

Canadian junior ice hockey team

- City: Bowmanville, Ontario
- League: Provincial Junior Hockey League
- Division: Orr
- Founded: 2011
- Home arena: Garnet B. Rickard Recreation Complex
- Colours: Black, red, and white
- General manager: Dean Baumhauer
- Head coach: Dean Baumhauer

Championships
- League champions: (16x) 1971, 1977, 1978, 1979, 1981, 1982, 1984, 1985, 1993, 1994, 1995, 2012, 2015, 2022, 2023, 2024
- Clarence Schmalz Cups: (2x) 1979, 1981

The Clarington Eagles are a Canadian junior ice hockey team based in Bowmanville, Ontario. They play in the Orr Division of the Provincial Junior Hockey League.

== History ==
The Eagles were founded in 2011 to leave the gap in their community left by the folding of the Junior A Bowmanville Eagles. Bowmanville originated in Junior C from 1968 until 1995 and was promoted to Junior A. The team folded in 2010.

The Eagles played their first game on September 23, 2011, in Uxbridge, Ontario. They dropped a 6-4 decision to the Uxbridge Bruins. Their first home game was on September 25, 2011, a 6–3 loss to the Bruins. On October 2, 2011, the Eagles won their first game, at home, 3–2 against the Little Britain Merchants.

The Eagles' first season back in Junior C ended with a winning 19-18-3 record. In their first playoffs, the Eagles first met the Uxbridge Bruins in the quarter-finals. The Eagles swept the best-of-5 series 3-games-to-none. In the semi-finals, the Eagles faced the second seeded Little Britain Merchants. Clarington came back from a 3-games-to-2 deficit to win the series in seven games, the winning goal scored with 16.8 seconds left in the third period of game seven. In the finals, the Eagles faced the first place Lakefield Chiefs. The Chiefs took the first game, but the Eagles came back to win the next three straight. Lakefield made the series interesting by winning game five, but the Ealges smoked the Chiefs 8–1 in game six to take the series and win their first league championship and the Cougar Cup and berth into the Clarence Schmalz Cup playoffs.

== 2024–25 team staff ==
- Governor: Nick Dennis
- Alternate governor / head trainer: Craig Wilcox
- General manager / head coach: Dean Baumhauer
- Assistant general manager: Craig Wilcox
- Assistant coaches: Dave Fairey, Jamie Showers, Neil Taylor
- Goalie coach: Dan Wilcox

== Season-by-season standings ==
Season	GP	W	L	T	OTL	GF	GA	P	Results	Playoffs
2011-12	40	19	18	-	3	170	163	41	4th COJCHL	Won quarter-finals, 3-0 (Bruins); Won semi-finals, 4-3 (Merchants); Won finals, 4-2 (Chiefs)
2012-13	40	20	15	-	5	126	122	45	3rd COJCHL	Won quarter-finals, 3-1 (Ice); Lost semi-finals, 0-4 (Chiefs)
2013-14	40	25	12	-	3	151	111	53	2nd COJCHL	Lost semi-final, 3-4 (Bruins)
2014-15	42	27	13	-	2	187	124	56	3rd COJCHL	Won semi-final, 4-0 (Chiefs); Won league finals, 4-0 (Bruins); Lost CSC quarters, 2-4 (Port Hope)
2015-16	42	36	3	2	1	216	92	75	1st of 7 COJCHL	Quarter-finals BYE; Won semi-final, 4-2 (Chiefs); Lost league finals, 1-4 (Mojacks)
2016-17	41	30	10	1	-	187	94	61	3rd of 7 Orr Div-PJHL	Won div. quarter-finals, 4-0 (Merchants); Won div. semi-finals, 4-2 (Mojacks); Lost div. finals, 0-4 (Chiefs)
2017-18	41	25	15	1	-	145	107	51	4th of 7 Orr Div-PJHL	Lost div. quarter-finals, 2-4 (Knights)
2018-19	42	18	20	2	2	141	149	40	4th of 7 Orr Div-PJHL	Lost div. quarter-finals, 1-2 (Mojacks)
2019-20	42	28	9	1	4	180	112	61	1st of 7 Orr Div-PJHL	Won div. quarter-finals, 4-2 (Bruins); Incomplete semi-finals (Knights); COVID-19 ended playoffs early
2020-21	Season lost due to COVID-19 pandemic									
2021-22	31	23	6	0	2	131	58	48	2nd of 7 Orr Div-PJHL	Won div. quarter-finals, 4-0 (Mojacks); Won div. semi-finals, 4-1 (Knights); Won div. finals 4-0 (Merchants); Won Conf Finals 4-1 (Raiders); Advanced to CSC finals (see below)
2022-23	41	34	5	1	1	220	70	70	1st of 7 Orr Div-PJHL	Won div. quarter-finals, 4-0 (Chiefs); Won div. semi-finals, 4-0 (Ice); Won div. finals 4-0 Bruins; Won East Conf. 4-0 (Panthers); Advanced to CSC finals (see below)
2023-24	42	36	6	0	0	238	86	70	1st of 7 Orr Div-PJHL	Won div. quarter-finals, 4-0 (Knights); Won div. semi-finals, 4-1 (Chiefs); Won div. finals 4-0 (Ice); Won East Conf 4-2 (Raiders); Won league semi-finals 4-2 (Barons); Lost league finals 1-4 (Canadiens)
2024-25	42	35	6	0	1	220	74	71	1st of 7 Orr Div; 1st of 15 East Conf; 4th of 63 - PJHL	Won div. quarter-finals, 4-0 (Golden Hawks); Won div. semi-finals 4-0 (Lumberjacks); Won div. finals 4-0 (Ice); Lost East Conf final 0-4 (Raiders)
2025-26	42	26	12	4	0	168	98	56	3rd of 7 Orr Div; 7th of 14 East Conf; 19th of 61 - PJHL	Won div. quarter-finals, bye Won div. semi-finals 4-3 (Ice); Lost div. finals 2-4 (Bruins)

== Clarence Schmalz Cup Championships ==
Year	Round robin	Record	Standing	Semi-final	Championship game
2022	L, Stayner Siskins 0-3; OTW, Grimsby Peach Kings 2-1; W, Lakeshore Canadiens 4-1	2-1-0-0	2nd of 4	W, Stayner Siskins 4-1	L, Lakeshore Canadiens 2-3
2023	W, Stayner Siskins 4-1; L, Wellesley Applejacks 5-7; W, Lakeshore Canadiens 4-0	2-1-0	2nd of 4	W, Stayner Siskins 2-1-1	L, Wellesley Applejacks 2-3
