= Port Perry Lumberjacks =

Canadian junior ice hockey team

Port Perry LumberJacks
- City: Port Perry, Ontario
- League: Provincial Junior Hockey League
- Founded: 1972
- Home arena: Scugog Community Recreation Centre
- Colours: Green, yellow, black and white
- General manager: Tom Parish
- Head coach: Doug Parkin
- Affiliates: Haliburton County Huskies; Oshawa Generals

Franchise history
- 1972–80: Port Perry Flamingos; 1980–2022: Port Perry MoJacks; 2022–present: Port Perry LumberJacks

Championships
- League champions: 1988, 1992, 2006, 2011, and 2016

The Port Perry LumberJacks are a Junior ice hockey team that play in the Provincial Junior Hockey League and based in Port Perry, Ontario, Canada.

== History ==
The Port Perry LumberJacks joined the Central Lakeshore Junior C Hockey League in 1972 as the Port Perry Flamingos named after their sponsor, Flamingo Tarts. Prior to the 1980–1981 season the team's nickname was changed to MoJacks to coincide with Mother Jackson's Open Kitchens. Over the next thirteen seasons the MoJacks celebrated 8 winning seasons, but failed to win any regular season or playoff crowns.

Despite finishing fourth in the 1987-88 regular season, the MoJacks won the Central Ontario Junior "C" championship led by head coach George Burnett. From that point, they entered the Clarence Schmalz Cup All-Ontario championships. The MoJacks made it to the provincial final, but lost to the Great Lakes Junior C Hockey League's Mooretown Flags 4-games-to-1.

In 1991–1992, four seasons later, the MoJacks finished in first place overall in the league's regular season. They finished the season with twenty-six wins, six losses, and two ties. The MoJacks went on to win their second league title, but failed to advance in provincials.

In 2005–2006, the MoJacks took over the Central Ontario league. Port Perry finished the regular season with thirty-two wins, eight losses, and two overtime losses to win the regular season crown. In the league semi-finals, the MoJacks drew the Lakefield Chiefs. The MoJacks defeated the Chiefs 4-games-to-1. In the league final, the MoJacks challenged the third seed Uxbridge Bruins for the league title. The MoJacks came out on top and won their third league championship 4-games-to-2. In the All-Ontario playdown quarter-finals, the MoJacks first ran into the Empire B Junior C Hockey League's Napanee Raiders. The Raiders did not pose much of a threat as Port Perry swept them 4-games-to-none. The MoJacks came into the provincial semi-finals against the Georgian Mid-Ontario Junior C Hockey League powerhouse Penetang Kings. The MoJacks made a run at the eventual Clarence Schmalz Cup champions, but fell to the Kings 4-games-to-2.

The 2006–2007 season saw the Port Perry MoJacks finish in second place with twenty-two wins, right behind the Lakefield Chiefs. In the league semi-finals, the MoJacks challenged a resilient Little Britain Merchants squad. The series went the distance, but the MoJacks won game seven and the series 4-games-to-3 to earn a berth into the league finals. The finals saw the Mojacks enter against the top seeded Lakefield Chiefs. The Chiefs were on a role and showed the MoJacks why they finished in first place, sweeping the series 4-games-to-none.

The 2010–2011 season saw the MoJacks win another Central Ontario League title. The team however had a short run in the provincials dropping the quarter final round to the Empire B Champions Picton Pirates 4 games - 1.

Following the 2015–2016 season the seven junior c hockey leagues in Southern Ontario amalgamated under the Provincial Junior Hockey League banner and the Central Ontario Junior C Hockey League became the Orr Division of the East Conference in the new organization.

At the end of the 2021–2022 season the MoJacks renamed their team to the LumberJacks, after their new sponsor Lake Scugog Lumber.

== Season-by-season results ==
Season	GP	W	L	T	OTL	GF	GA	P	Results	Playoffs
1987-88	32	21	7		-	229	119	46	4th COJCHL	Won League
1988-89	40	21	14	5	-	212	196	47	4th COJCHL	
1989-90	36	20	8	8	-	201	141	48	2nd COJCHL	
1990-91	36	21	12	3	-	179	141	45	2nd COJCHL	
1991-92	34	26	6	2	0	225	153	54	1st COJCHL	Won League, lost CSC SF
1992-93	40	23	14	3	0	224	183	49	3rd COJCHL	
1993-94	30	18	10	2	0	150	105	38	2nd COJCHL	
1994-95	36	19	12	3	2	160	126	43	2nd COJCHL	
1995-96	42	28	9	5	0	224	125	61	2nd COJCHL	
1996-97	40	20	17	2	1	176	169	43	5th COJCHL	
1997-98	40	16	21	1	2	197	201	35	4th COJCHL	
1998-99	40	14	21	1	4	147	181	33	5th COJCHL	DNQ
1999-00	40	22	15	1	2	154	165	47	2nd COJCHL	Lost semi-final 0-4 (Ice)
2000-01	40	16	21	1	2	195	230	35	4th COJCHL	Lost semi-final 0-4 (Chiefs)
2001-02	42	22	13	6	1	170	131	51	4th COJCHL	Lost semi-final 0-4 (Chiefs)
2002-03	38	13	17	8	0	147	169	34	4th COJCHL	Lost semi-final 3-4 (Ice)
2003-04	38	8	28	2	0	120	177	18	5th COJCHL	Won quarter-final 2-0 (Merchants); Lost semi-final 0-4 (Ice)
2004-05	40	22	14	2	2	155	128	48	3rd COJCHL	Won semi-final 4-2 (Chiefs); Lost final 2-4 (Bruins)
2005-06	42	32	8	0	2	199	109	66	1st COJCHL	Won semi-final 4-1 (Chiefs); Won League 4-2 (Bruins); Won CSC semi-final 4-0 (Raiders); Lost CSC semi-final 2-4 (Kings)
2006-07	40	22	14	3	1	153	139	48	2nd COJCHL	Won semi-final 4-3 (Merchants); Lost final 0-4 (Chiefs)
2007-08	40	6	29	5	0	105	164	17	5th COJCHL	Lost quarter-final 1-3 (Bruins)
2008-09	40	23	13	3	1	160	140	50	2nd COJCHL	Lost semi-final 0-4 (Chiefs)
2009-10	40	19	14	-	7	171	159	45	2nd COJCHL	Lost semi-final 0-4 (Merchants)
2010-11	40	21	17	-	2	165	161	44	2nd COJCHL	Won semi-final 4-3 (Ice); Won League 4-3 (Bruins); Lost CSC quarter-final 1-4 (Pirates)
2011-12	40	20	18	-	2	149	163	42	3rd COJCHL	Lost quarter-final 1-3 (Ice)
2012-13	40	18	18	-	4	131	145	40	4th COJCHL	Won quarter-final 3-1 (Merchants); Lost semi-final 0-4 (Bruins)
2013-14	40	18	18	-	4	142	122	40	4th COJCHL	Lost semi-final 0-4 (Chiefs)
2014-15	42	26	14	-	2	172	125	54	4th COJCHL	Lost Play in 1-3 (Merchants)
2015-16	42	25	15	1	1	178	113	52	4th of 7 COJCHL	Won quarter-final 4-0 (Knights); Won semi-final 4-0 - (Bruins); Won League 4-1 (Eagles); Lost CSC quarter-final 1-4 (Port Hope)
2016-17	42	32	10	0	-	207	122	64	2nd of 7 Orr Division-PJHL	Quarterfinal - bye Lost semi-final 2-4 (Eagles)
2017-18	41	30	8	1	2	234	110	63	2nd of 7 Orr Division-PJHL	Won quarter-final 4-0 (Ice); Won semi-final 4-1 (Bruins); Lost final 1-4 (Chiefs)
2018-19	42	16	23	0	3	160	159	35	5th of 7 Orr Division-PJHL	Won quarter-final 2-1 (Eagles); Lost semi-final 0-4 (Bruins)
2019-20	42	17	23	0	2	171	194	36	6th of 7 Orr Division-PJHL	DNQ
2020-21	Season Lost due to COVID-19 pandemic									
2021-22	31	8	18	5	0	69	116	21	6th of 7 Orr Division-PJHL	Lost quarter-final 0-4 (Eagles)
Port Perry Lumberjacks
2022-23	42	10	28	4	0	105	197	24	6th of 7 Orr Division-PJHL	Lost quarter-final 0-4 (Bruins)
2023-24	42	19	22	1	0	155	166	24	5th of 7 Orr Division-PJHL	Lost quarter-final 0-4 (Chiefs)
2024-25	42	19	21	2	0	169	190	40	5th of 7 Orr Division; 9th of 15 North Conf; 40th of 63-PJHL	Won quarter-final 4-3 (Bruins); Lost semi-final 0-4 (Eagles)
2025-26	42	26	15	1	0	203	141	53	4th of 7 Orr Division; 7th of 14 North Conf; 24th of 63-PJHL	Won quarter-final 4-0 (Merchants); Lost semi-final 1-4 (Bruins)

== Schmalz Cup Finals appearances ==
1988: Mooretown Flags defeated Port Perry Mojacks 4-games-to-1

== 2024-25 team staff ==
- President - Brian Painter
- Governor/ General Manager - Tom Parish
- Director of Business and Hockey Operations - Brad Bricknell
- Head Coach - Ryan Connolly
- Assistant Coach/ Assistant GM - Doug Parkin
