= North Kawartha Knights =

Canadian junior ice hockey team

- City: Apsley, Ontario
- League: Provincial Junior Hockey League
- Division: Tod
- Founded: 2014
- Home arena: North Kawartha Community Centre
- Colours: Black, orange, and white
- General manager: Mark Savery
- Head coach: Cameron Medland and Shawn Tucker (2024)

The North Kawartha Knights are a Canadian junior ice hockey team based in Apsley, Ontario. They play in the Orr Division of the Provincial Junior Hockey League.

== History ==
The North Kawartha Knights joined the Central Ontario Junior C. Hockey League in the 2014–15 season under the leadership of owner Gord Mackenzie-Crowe and GM Gary Geraldi. The team has since been sold to current owners Josh Perks, John Trotter Sr., John Trotter Jr., Ed Whitmore and Duane Wiltshire.

On February 8, 2024, the PJHL announced a conference realignment that would take place starting in the 2024–25 season. North Kawartha, along with Lakefield, moved from the Orr Division into the Tod Division.

== Season-by-season standings ==
Season	GP	W	L	T	OTL	GF	GA	P	Results	Playoffs
2014-15	42	6	34	0	2	104	234	14	7th of 7 COJCHL	Did not qualify
2015-16	42	12	26	1	3	117	196	28	6th of 7 COJCHL	Lost quarter-finals 0-4 (Mojacks)
2016-17	42	18	24	0	0	152	166	36	4th of 7 Orr Div-PJHL	Lost div. quarter-finals, 3-4 (Bruins)
2017-18	42	18	21	1	2	168	171	39	5th of 7 Orr Div-PJHL	Won div. quarter-finals, 4-2 (Eagles) Lost div. semi-finals 0-4 99 (Chiefs)
2018-19	42	30	8	1	3	202	122	64	3rd of 7 Orr Div-PJHL	Won div. semi-finals, 4-3 (Chiefs) Lost div. finals 1-4 (Bruins)
2019-20	42	30	11	0	1	184	104	61	1st of 7 Orr Div-PJHL	Won div. quarter-finals, 4-3 (Chiefs); Incomplete semi-finals, (Eagles); COVID-19 ended playoffs early
2020-21	Season lost due to COVID-19 pandemic									
2021-22	32	17	12	0	3	95	119	29	5th of 7 Orr Div-PJHL	Lost div. semi-finals, 1-4 (Eagles)
2022-23	42	18	21	3	0	119	154	39	5th of 7 Orr Div-PJHL	Lost div. quarter-finals, 1-4 (Ice)
2023-24	42	6	35	0	1	100	251	13	7th of 7 Orr Div-PJHL	Lost div. quarter-finals, 0-4 (Eagles)
2024-25	42	3	37	1	1	81	309	8	8th of 8 Tod Division; 14th of 15 East Conf; 62nd of 63-PJHL	Lost div. quarter-finals, 0-4 (Huskies)
