= Little Britain, Ontario =

Little Britain
- Compact rural community
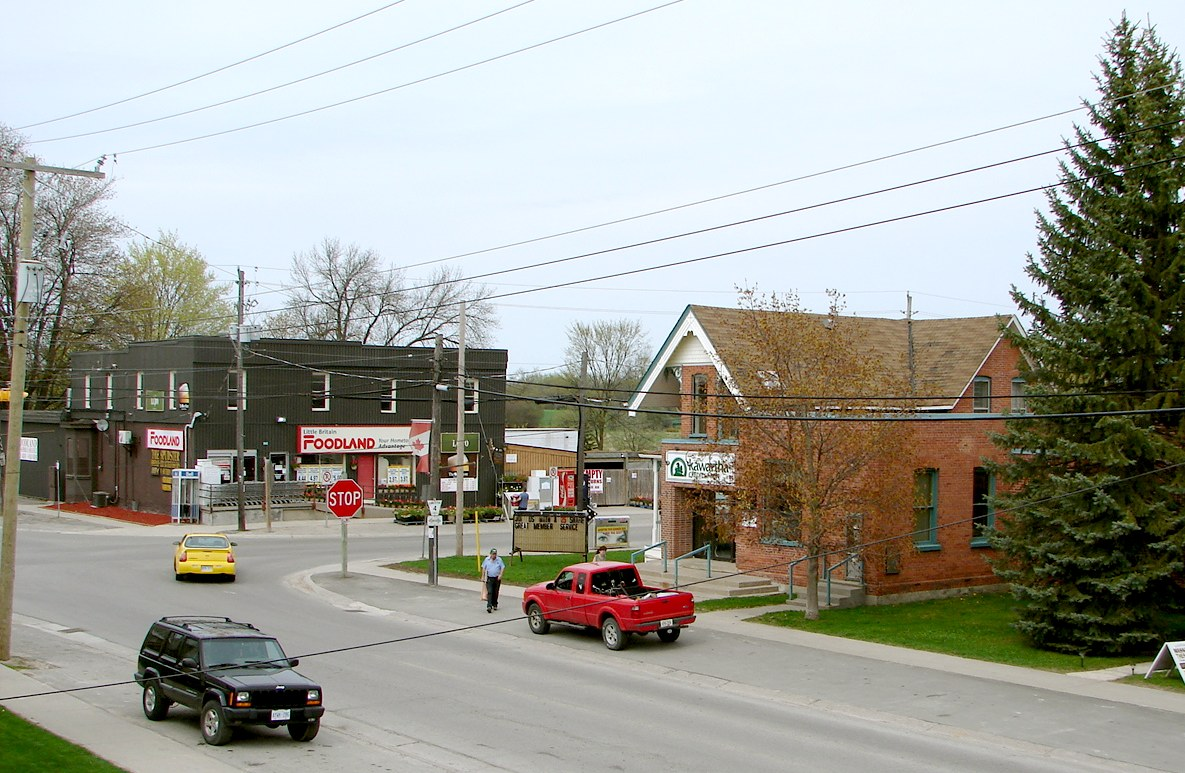
- Etymology: named after Little Britain, Pennsylvania
- Motto: 'Sports Capital of the Kawarthas'
- Location in southern Ontario
- Coordinates: 44°17′08″N 78°51′37″W
- Country: Canada
- Province: Ontario
- Municipality: Kawartha Lakes
- Ward: Ward 4
- Established: 1834
- Elevation: 256 m (840 ft)

Population
  - Total: approx. 1,100
- Time zone: UTC-5 (Eastern Time Zone)
  - Summer (DST): UTC-4 (Eastern Time Zone)
- Postal code: K0M 2C0
- Area codes: 705, 249

Little Britain is a compact rural community in the City of Kawartha Lakes, Ontario, Canada. It is located 15 kilometres (9.3 mi) southwest of Lindsay. Formerly a part of Mariposa Township and Victoria County, Little Britain is now part of Ward 4, City of Kawartha Lakes.

== History ==
Little Britain was established in 1834 by Harrison Haight who built the first mill in 1837. This mill, which stood until 1910, took nearly the whole countryside to build. At the time, there was no road that led from Little Britain to Oakwood, located 5 kilometres (3.1 mi) to the north. The first church was built in 1850, followed by the Bible Church in 1852. The Post Office came in 1853.

Names suggested for the town were Margaretville, after Margaret Metherell, and Elm Grove, proposed by the first postmaster, Robert Fergusson Whiteside. The latter was rejected by the post office because of duplication, so Whiteside named it after his place of origin, Little Britain, Pennsylvania.

Prominent members of the time included Joseph Maunder's carriage and blacksmithing works, W.M Burden's carriage shop, Edwin Mark's foundry, Isaac Finley's steam roller flour mill, Dr George Wesley Hall MD and the Davidson's flour mill. The railway was brought into Lindsay around the turn of the century. This however, did little to advance Little Britain's economic output. In fact the population of Mariposa Township declined sharply between 1871–1920 from 3,132 to 2,231.

== Today ==
Today, Little Britain is still a primarily agricultural town. It also has a fairly significant tourist presence from the influx of cottagers on nearby Lake Scugog and from those who use Little Britain Road as a means to bypass heavy cottager summer traffic on Ontario Highway 7. Little Britain offers a number of comfortable amenities including a restaurant, bakery, bank, library, grocery store, post office, park, arena and a country gift store as well as many other services. There is a gas bar, two auto repair shops, a drugstore and a medical office.
