= Bowmanville Eagles =

- City: Bowmanville, Ontario, Canada
- League: Ontario Junior Hockey League; Central Ontario Junior C Hockey League
- Operated: 1968-2010
- Home arena: G.B. Rickard Arena Complex
- Colours: Orange, Black, and White
- General manager: Curtis Hodgins
- Head coach: Curtis Hodgins
- Affiliates: Port Perry Mojacks (COJCHL); Clarington Toros (OMHA)

Franchise history
- 2010: Merged w/ Cobourg Cougars

The Bowmanville Eagles were a Junior "A" ice hockey team from Bowmanville, Ontario, Canada. They were a part of the Central Canadian Hockey League. The Eagles left the OHA in 2010 when they merged with the Cobourg Cougars and left Bowmanville.

== History ==
The team has been known as the Bowmanville Eagles since 1978. Prior to this they were known as the Bowmanville Red Eagles. The team was a member of the Central Ontario Junior C Hockey League early on. The Eagles won the Clarence Schmalz Cup as Ontario Hockey Association Junior "C" Champions in 1981. Past 1987, the Eagles enjoyed 8 straight winning seasons and 4 league championships. After their 3rd straight league title in 1995, the Eagles under the guidance of Mike Laing, the General Manager and eventual owner during the winning years of the 1990s, made the jump to the OPJHL. The team was sold by Mike Laing mid season in 1998 to Peter Neal and Scott Mackie from Whitby, Ontario.

From 1995 until 2003, the Eagles achieved moderate results, never pushing much further than a barely winning record. Since 2003, the Eagles have put together 4 straight dominant seasons.

The Eagles were the picture of consistency over the past eight years, posting six 30+ win seasons and winning the CCHL East Division in 2010.

It is being reported that the Eagles will close its doors before the 2010–11 season.

In 2011–12, the Eagles were resurrected as the Clarington Eagles as members of the Central Ontario Junior C Hockey League.

== Season-by-season results ==
Season	GP	W	L	T	OTL	GF	GA	P	Results	Playoffs
1987-88	32	27	4	1	-	242	122	55	2nd COJCHL	
1988-89	40	21	12	7	-	206	152	49	3rd COJCHL	
1989-90	36	27	7	2	-	241	136	56	1st COJCHL	Won League
1990-91	36	18	14	4	-	168	165	40	3rd COJCHL	
1991-92	34	20	11	2	1	184	165	43	3rd COJCHL	
1992-93	40	25	13	1	1	242	173	52	2nd COJCHL	Won League
1993-94	30	22	7	1	0	160	103	45	1st COJCHL	Won League
1994-95	36	31	4	0	1	220	116	63	1st COJCHL	Won League
1995-96	50	23	23	4	-	200	212	53	2nd OPJHL-R	
1996-97	51	15	31	5	-	215	285	37	4th OPJHL-R	
1997-98	51	27	19	5	0	210	178	59	3rd OPJHL-R	
1998-99	51	18	23	6	4	188	206	46	9th OPJHL-E	
1999-00	49	19	24	6	0	188	208	44	6th OPJHL-E	
2000-01	49	19	21	7	2	187	181	47	7th OPJHL-E	
2001-02	49	15	23	7	4	159	174	41	7th OPJHL-E	
2002-03	49	19	24	5	1	163	178	44	7th OPJHL-E	
2003-04	49	31	10	4	4	218	147	70	2nd OPJHL-E	
2004-05	49	34	12	3	0	159	97	71	3rd OPJHL-E	
2005-06	49	39	5	5	0	255	95	83	1st OPJHL-E	Lost League SF
2006-07	49	39	6	3	1	248	125	82	1st OPJHL-E	Lost Conf. SF
2007-08	49	21	18	-	10	135	145	52	5th OPJHL-E	
2008-09	49	24	20	-	5	162	160	53	4th OJHL-R	
2009-10	50	32	13	-	5	181	132	69	1st CCHL-E	Lost Final

== Clarence Schmalz Cup appearances ==
1971: Dresden Jr. Kings defeated Bowmanville Red Eagles 4-games-to-3
1977: Essex 73's defeated Bowmanville Red Eagles 4-games-to-2
1978: Essex 73's defeated Bowmanville Red Eagles 4-games-to-1
1979: Bowmanville Eagles defeated Kincardine Kinucks 4-games-to-none
1981: Bowmanville Eagles defeated Essex 73's 4-games-to-2
1982: Flamborough Colts defeated Bowmanville Eagles 7-1 in round robin final
1995: Belle River Canadiens defeated Bowmanville Eagles 4-games-to-none

== Notable alumni ==
- Kevin McClelland
- Adam Munro
- James Neal
