= 2023–24 PJHL season =

- League: Provincial Junior Hockey League
- Sport: Hockey
- Teams: 61
- Finals champions: Lakeshore Canadiens

PJHL seasons
- 2022–23 PJHL 2024–25 PJHL

The 2023–24 season was the 9th season for the Provincial Junior Hockey League.

== Team changes ==
- The Fergus Whalers were introduced as an expansion team after folding as the Fergus Devils after the 2014-15 season.
- The Paris Titans were renamed from the Paris Mounties after the team was sold.
- The Wallaceburg Thunderhawks relocated to Walpole Island and were renamed the Walpole Island Wild.

== Standings ==
Note: GP = Games played; W = Wins; L = Losses; OTL = Overtime losses; SL = Shootout losses; GF = Goals for; GA = Goals against; PTS = Points

=== East Orr Division ===
Rank	Team	GP	W	L	OTL	T	Pts	GF	GA
1	Clarington Eagles	42	36	6	0	0	72	238	86
2	Georgina Ice	42	30	12	0	0	60	220	118
3	Uxbridge Bruins	42	23	18	1	0	47	161	162
4	Lakefield Chiefs	42	20	18	3	1	44	160	176
5	Port Perry Lumberjacks	42	19	22	1	0	39	155	166
6	Little Britain Merchants	42	12	26	4	0	28	113	188
7	North Kawartha Knights	42	6	35	0	1	13	100	251

=== East Tod Division ===
Rank	Team	GP	W	L	OTL	T	Pts	GF	GA
1	Frankford Huskies	42	30	8	4	0	64	219	116
2	Amherstview Jets	42	27	14	1	0	55	215	147
3	Port Hope Panthers	42	24	13	4	1	53	176	140
4	Napanee Raiders	42	25	15	0	2	52	192	123
5	Picton Pirates	42	17	22	1	2	37	143	167
6	Campbellford Rebels	42	0	40	1	1	2	61	313

=== North Carruthers Division ===
Rank	Team	GP	W	L	OTL	T	Pts	GF	GA
1	Alliston Hornets	42	36	6	0	0	72	233	83
2	Stayner Siskins	42	33	9	0	0	66	211	109
3	Orillia Terriers	42	29	10	1	2	61	183	93
4	Schomberg Cougars	42	27	12	2	1	57	161	117
5	Penetang Kings	42	18	20	1	3	40	145	167
6	Huntsville Otters	42	17	23	1	1	36	121	150
7	Caledon Golden Hawks	42	13	25	1	3	30	98	139
8	Innisfil Spartans	42	7	31	2	2	18	97	195
9	Midland Flyers	42	3	37	2	0	8	68	264

=== North Pollock Division ===
Rank	Team	GP	W	L	OTL	T	Pts	GF	GA
1	Hanover Barons	42	36	4	0	2	74	208	94
2	Mount Forest Patriots	42	32	7	3	0	67	183	103
3	Kincardine Bulldogs	42	23	12	2	5	53	143	123
4	Fergus Whalers	42	20	17	3	2	45	152	135
5	Walkerton Capitals	42	18	20	2	2	40	122	133
6	Wingham Ironmen	42	17	21	3	1	38	102	118
7	Mitchell Hawks	42	11	26	3	2	27	108	154
8	Goderich Flyers	42	3	35	2	2	10	66	224

=== South Bloomfield Division ===
Rank	Team	GP	W	L	OTL	T	Pts	GF	GA
1	Grimsby Peach Kings	42	32	7	2	1	67	203	98
2	Dundas Blues	42	28	13	1	0	57	195	141
3	Glanbrook Rangers	42	25	14	2	1	53	177	127
4	Niagara Riverhawks	42	23	14	4	1	51	168	147
5	Hagersville Hawks	42	17	19	4	2	40	139	159
6	Dunnville Jr. Mudcats	42	10	27	3	2	25	103	186
7	Port Dover Sailors	42	8	33	0	1	17	88	215

=== South Doherty Division ===
Rank	Team	GP	W	L	OTL	T	Pts	GF	GA
1	New Hamburg Firebirds	42	33	7	2	0	68	187	106
2	Woodstock Navy-Vets	42	31	8	3	0	65	167	109
3	Tavistock Braves	42	23	16	1	2	49	142	114
4	Norwich Merchants	42	19	17	5	1	44	141	144
5	Wellesley Applejacks	42	19	22	1	0	39	121	137
6	Hespeler Shamrocks	42	12	28	2	0	26	124	176
7	Paris Titans	42	8	31	2	1	19	97	193

=== West Stobbs Division ===
Rank	Team	GP	W	L	OTL	T	Pts	GF	GA
1	Lakeshore Canadiens	42	37	5	0	0	74	241	70
2	Essex 73's	42	35	4	1	2	73	245	85
3	Blenheim Blades	42	28	12	1	1	58	184	134
4	Wheatley Sharks	42	25	14	2	1	53	180	108
5	Mooretown Flags	42	18	17	5	2	43	152	162
6	Amherstburg Admirals	42	10	32	0	0	20	109	219
7	Dresden Jr. Kings	42	6	34	2	0	14	75	232
8	Walpole Island Wild	42	6	36	0	0	12	73	249

=== West Yeck Division ===
Rank	Team	GP	W	L	OTL	T	Pts	GF	GA
1	Thamesford Trojans	42	30	9	0	1	61	171	89
2	Mount Brydges Bulldogs	42	29	9	1	1	60	199	129
3	North Middlesex Stars	42	28	9	1	2	59	213	117
4	Dorchester Dolphins	42	26	9	4	1	57	159	116
5	Exeter Hawks	42	17	19	4	0	38	128	153
6	Petrolia Flyers	42	15	20	2	3	35	122	148
7	Port Stanley Sailors	42	14	22	3	1	32	106	157
8	Lucan Irish	42	9	28	3	0	21	113	192
9	Aylmer Spitfires	42	7	32	0	1	15	74	184

== Statistics ==
=== Scoring leaders ===
Note: GP = Games played; G = Goals; A = Assists; Pts = Points; PIM = Penalty minutes

Player	Team	GP	G	A	Pts	PIM
Brody Leblanc	Mount Forest Patriots	40	51	50	101	32
Ethan Tichenoff	North Middlesex Stars	37	42	50	92	20
Mike McCullough	Georgina Ice	38	37	45	82	74
Cole Turcotte	Alliston Hornets	42	38	43	81	50
Dylan Dupuis	Mooretown Flags	42	33	46	79	76
Nolan Griffiths	Mount Brydges Bulldogs	38	27	49	76	48
Craig Spence	Blenheim Blades	36	25	49	74	65
Ryan Burke	Glanbrook Rangers	41	31	40	71	26
Trevor Urquhart	Clarington Eagles	42	22	49	71	36
Kyle Maloney	Hanover Barons	30	15	53	68	46

=== Leading goaltenders ===
Note: GP = Games played; Mins = Minutes played; W = Wins; L = Losses: OTL = Overtime losses;
T = Ties; GA = Goals Allowed; SO = Shutouts; GAA = Goals against average

Player	Team	GP	MINS	W	L	OTL	T	GA	SO	Sv%	GAA
Boe Piroski	Lakeshore Canadiens	21	1258	19	2	0	0	31	5	0.937	1.48
Jaxon Drysdale	Wheatley Sharks	17	920	15	2	0	0	25	5	0.926	1.63
Jude Rondina	Clarington Eagles	28	1673	20	7	1	0	48	5	0.940	1.72
Nicholas Bolton	Lakeshore Canadiens	21	1260	18	3	0	0	38	5	0.924	1.81
Rod Lewis	Alliston Hornets	24	1430	21	2	0	0	44	4	0.929	1.85

== 2024 Schmalz Cup Playoffs ==
Division Quarterfinal
O1	Clarington	4
O7	North Kawartha	0
O4	Lakefield	4
O5	Port Perry	0
O3	Uxbridge	bye
O2	Georgina	4
O6	Little Britain	0
T1	Frankford	bye
T4	Napanee	4
T5	Picton	2
T3	Port Hope	4
T6	Campbellford	0
T2	Amhsertview	bye
C1	Alliston	4
C8	Innisfil	0
C4	Schomberg	4
C5	Penetang	3
C3	Orillia	4
C6	Huntsville	0
C2	Stayner	4
C7	Caledon	0
P1	Hanover	4
P8	Goderich	0
P4	Fergus	4
P5	Walkerton	0
P3	Kincardine	4
P6	Wingham	3
P2	Mount Forest	4
P7	Mitchell	0
B1	Grimsby	bye
B4	Niagara	4
B5	Hagersville	2
B3	Glanbrook	4
B6	Dunnville	0
B2	Dundas	4
B7	Port Dover	0
D1	New Hamburg	4
D8	Hespeler	0
D4	Norwich	4
D5	Wellesley	3
D3	Tavistock	3
D6	Hespeler	4
D2	Woodstock	4
D7	Paris	1
S1	Lakeshore	4
S8	Walpole Island	0
S4	Wheatley	4
S5	Mooretown	1
S3	Blenheim	4
S6	Amherstburg	1
S2	Essex	4
S7	Dresden	0
Y1	Thamesford	4
Y8	Lucan	1
Y4	Dorchester	3
Y5	Exeter	4
Y3	North Middlesex	4
Y6	Petrolia	0
Y2	Mount Brydges	4
Y7	Port Stanley	0

Division Semifinal
O1	Clarington	4
O4	Lakefield	1
O2	Georgina	4
O3	Uxbridge	0
T1	Frankford	2
T4	Napanee	4
T2	Amherstview	2
T3	Port Hope	4
C1	Alliston	4
C4	Schomberg	1
C2	Stayner	4
C3	Orillia	0
P1	Hanover	4
P4	Fergus	2
P2	Mount Forest	4
P3	Kincardine	1
B1	Grimsby	4
B4	Niagara	0
B2	Dundas	4
B3	Glanbrook	3
D1	New Hamburg	4
D6	Hespeler	1
D2	Woodstock	4
D4	Norwich	1
S1	Lakeshore	4
S4	Wheatley	0
S2	Essex	4
S3	Blenheim	0
Y1	Thamesford	4
Y5	Exeter	0
Y2	Mount Brydges	4
Y3	North Middlesex	2

Division Final
O1	Clarington	4
O2	Georgina	0
T3	Port Hope	0
T4	Napanee	4
C1	Alliston	4
C2	Stayner	0
P1	Hanover	4
P2	Mount Forest	3
B1	Grimsby	4
B2	Dundas	1
D1	New Hamburg	4
D2	Woodstock	1
S1	Lakeshore	4
S2	Essex	3
Y1	Thamesford	4
Y2	Mount Brydges	1

Conference Final
O1	Clarington	4
T4	Napanee	2
C1	Alliston	1
P1	Hanover	4
B1	Grimsby	1
D1	New Hamburg	4
S1	Lakeshore	4
Y1	Thamesford	0

League Semifinal
O1	Clarington	4
P1	Hanover	2
D1	New Hamburg	2
S1	Lakeshore	4

Schmalz Cup Final
O1	Clarington	1
S1	Lakeshore	4
