= 2022–23 PJHL season =

- League: Provincial Junior Hockey League
- Sport: Hockey
- Teams: 60
- Finals champions: Wellesley Applejacks

PJHL seasons
- 2021–22 PJHL 2023–24 PJHL

The 2022–23 season was the 8th season for the Provincial Junior Hockey League.

== Team changes ==
After a one-year leave of absence during the 2021–22 season, the Paris Mounties returned to the league for the 2022–23 season.

== Standings ==
Note: GP = Games played; W = Wins; L = Losses; OTL = Overtime losses; SL = Shootout losses; GF = Goals for; GA = Goals against; PTS = Points

=== East Orr Division ===
Rank	Team	GP	W	L	OTL	T	Pts	GF	GA	GD
1	Clarington Eagles	41	34	5	1	1	70	220	70	+150
2	Uxbridge Bruins	41	27	9	5	0	59	154	120	+34
3	Little Britain Merchants	42	23	12	6	1	53	142	119	+23
4	Georgina Ice	40	22	15	3	0	47	144	141	+3
5	North Kawartha Knights	42	18	21	3	0	39	119	154	-35
6	Port Perry Lumberjacks	42	10	28	4	0	24	105	197	-92
7	Lakefield Chiefs	42	10	30	2	0	22	96	179	-83

=== East Tod Division ===
Rank	Team	GP	W	L	OTL	T	Pts	GF	GA	GD
1	Napanee Raiders	41	35	5	1	0	71	218	113	+105
2	Amherstview Jets	42	26	13	3	0	55	176	144	+32
3	Picton Pirates	42	23	15	3	1	50	152	119	+33
4	Port Hope Panthers	42	22	17	3	0	47	144	133	+11
5	Frankford Huskies	42	15	24	3	0	33	152	189	-37
6	Campbellford Rebels	41	3	35	2	1	9	91	235	-144

=== North Carruthers Division ===
Rank	Team	GP	W	L	OTL	T	Pts	GF	GA	GD
1	Stayner Siskins	40	36	4	0	0	72	212	74	+138
2	Alliston Hornets	40	30	7	2	1	63	203	118	+85
3	Schomberg Cougars	40	28	9	2	1	59	196	114	+82
4	Innisfil Spartans	40	20	17	2	1	43	151	161	-10
5	Orillia Terriers	40	19	18	1	2	41	139	151	-12
6	Huntsville Otters	40	17	21	1	1	36	132	159	-27
7	Midland Flyers	41	9	27	4	1	23	126	198	-72
8	Caledon Golden Hawks	41	9	28	3	1	22	111	196	-85
9	Penetang Kings	40	8	26	4	2	22	110	209	-99

=== North Pollock Division ===
Rank	Team	GP	W	L	OTL	T	Pts	GF	GA	GD
1	Mount Forest Patriots	42	32	9	0	1	65	201	130	+71
2	Mitchell Hawks	42	26	11	3	2	57	142	101	+41
3	Hanover Barons	42	26	12	2	2	56	151	105	+46
4	Wingham Ironmen	42	26	13	2	1	55	146	109	+37
5	Kincardine Bulldogs	42	18	18	5	1	42	156	148	+8
6	Wingham Ironmen	42	8	32	1	1	18	129	205	-76
7	Goderich Flyers	42	7	33	2	0	16	114	241	-127

=== South Bloomfield Division ===
Rank	Team	GP	W	L	OTL	T	Pts	GF	GA	GD
1	Glanbrook Rangers	42	35	3	3	1	74	210	94	+116
2	Grimsby Peach Kings	42	32	10	0	0	64	168	105	+63
3	Port Dover Sailors	42	21	15	5	1	48	148	153	-5
4	Niagara Riverhawks	42	21	16	5	0	47	161	167	-6
5	Dundas Blues	42	15	19	5	3	38	133	148	-15
6	Dunnville Jr. Mudcats	42	13	25	2	2	30	111	170	-59
7	Hagersville Hawks	42	6	31	4	1	17	95	189	-94

=== South Doherty Division ===
Rank	Team	GP	W	L	OTL	T	Pts	GF	GA	GD
1	New Hamburg Firebirds	42	31	6	3	2	67	194	91	+103
2	Wellesley Applejacks	42	31	7	2	2	66	185	110	+75
3	Norwich Merchants	42	29	12	1	0	59	190	122	+68
4	Tavistock Braves	41	21	15	3	2	47	142	121	+21
5	Woodstock Navy-Vets	41	18	21	1	1	38	140	171	-31
6	Paris Mounties	41	5	32	2	2	14	88	202	-114
7	Hespeler Shamrocks	41	5	32	3	1	14	83	205	-122

=== West Stobbs Division ===
Rank	Team	GP	W	L	OTL	T	Pts	GF	GA	GD
1	Essex 73's	42	36	4	2	0	74	200	66	+134
2	Lakeshore Canadiens	41	32	7	1	1	66	182	82	+100
3	Wheatley Sharks	42	27	11	3	1	58	165	99	+66
4	Blenheim Blades	42	24	14	4	0	52	166	112	+54
5	Mooretown Flags	41	21	19	1	0	43	145	143	+2
6	Amherstburg Admirals	42	13	26	3	0	29	117	186	-69
7	Dresden Jr. Kings	42	9	31	2	0	20	105	221	-116
8	Wallaceburg Thunderhawks	42	4	35	3	0	11	91	262	-171

=== West Yeck Division ===
Rank	Team	GP	W	L	OTL	T	Pts	GF	GA	GD
1	Mount Brydges Bulldogs	40	29	7	3	1	62	169	105	+64
2	North Middlesex Stars	40	27	8	2	3	59	203	104	+99
3	Thamesford Trojans	39	25	9	4	1	55	162	104	+58
4	Exeter Hawks	39	23	11	3	2	51	141	111	+30
5	Dorchester Dolphins	39	20	15	3	1	44	148	135	+13
6	Lucan Irish	40	18	19	2	1	39	146	143	+3
7	Port Stanley Sailors	40	14	20	3	3	34	136	155	-19
8	Petrolia Flyers	40	10	26	1	3	24	82	158	-76
9	Aylmer Spitfires	39	4	34	0	1	9	77	249	-172

== Statistics ==
=== Scoring leaders ===
Note: GP = Games played; G = Goals; A = Assists; Pts = Points; PIM = Penalty minutes

Player	Team	GP	G	A	Pts	PIM
Jake Weston	North Middlesex Stars	39	32	49	81	4
Elijah Brahaney	Mount Forest Patriots	41	36	41	77	38
Cameron Kokelj	Schomberg Cougars	36	30	47	77	24
Dawson Manning	Clarington Eagles	39	21	54	75	18
Damen Boose	Stayner Siskins	40	36	35	71	12
Luke Miehm	Schomberg Cougars	38	27	44	71	68
Cole Turcotte	Alliston Hornets	34	33	35	68	37
Christopher Prucha	Stayner Siskins	37	30	38	68	42
Sean Golebiowski	Glanbrook Rangers	37	31	36	67	138
Caleb Cribbin	Mount Forest Patriots	37	30	37	67	26

=== Leading goaltenders ===
Note: GP = Games played; Mins = Minutes played; W = Wins; L = Losses: OTL = Overtime losses;
T = Ties; GA = Goals allowed; SO = Shutouts; GAA = Goals against average

Player	Team	GP	MINS	W	L	OTL	T	GA	SO	Sv%	GAA
Nick Ciccarelli	Stayner Siskins	19	1142	16	3	0	0	26	6	0.945	1.37
Adrian McBride	Essex 73's	25	1503	21	3	1	0	38	6	0.937	1.52
Cavan McCabe	Essex 73's	17	1016	15	1	1	0	27	4	0.942	1.59
Blake Richard	New Hamburg Firebirds	23	1302	16	5	1	0	36	5	0.930	1.66
Romano Liburdi	Lakeshore Canadiens	25	1432	19	4	1	0	42	5	0.930	1.76

== 2023 Schmalz Cup Playoffs ==
Division quarterfinal	Division semifinal
O1	Clarington	4
O7	Lakefield	0
O1	Clarington	4
O4	Georgina	0
O4	Georgina	4
O5	North Kawartha	1
East - Orr
O3	Little Britain	bye
O2	Uxbridge	4
O3	Little Britain	2
O2	Uxbridge	4
O6	Port Perry	0
T1	Napanee	bye
T1	Napanee	2
T4	Port Hope	4
T4	Port Hope	4
T5	Frankford	1
East - Tod
T3	Picton	4
T6	Campbellford	0
T2	Amherstview	2
T3	Picton	4
T2	Amhsertview	bye

Division final
O1	Clarington	4
O2	Uxbridge	0
T3	Picton	1
T4	Port Hope	4

Conference final
O1	Clarington	4
T4	Port Hope	0

Division quarterfinal	Division semifinal
C1	Stayner	4
C7	Midland	0
C1	Stayner	4
C5	Orillia	0
C4	Innisfil	1
C5	Orillia	4
North - Carruthers
C3	Schomberg	4
C6	Huntsville	0
C2	Alliston	4
C3	Schomberg	3
C2	Alliston	4
C9	Penetang	0
P1	Mount Forest	bye
P1	Mount Forest	4
P4	Wingham	3
P4	Wingham	4
P5	Kincardine	1
North - Pollock
P3	Hanover	4
P6	Walkerton	0
P2	Mitchell	1
P3	Hanover	4
P2	Mitchell	4
P7	Goderich	0

Division final
C1	Stayner	4
C2	Alliston	1
P1	Mount Forest	4
P3	Hanover	1

Conference final
C1	Stayner	4
P1	Mount Forest	2

Division quarterfinal	Division semifinal
B1	Glanbrook	bye
B1	Glanbrook	4
B4	Niagara	1
B4	Niagara	4
B5	Dundas	3
South - Bloomfield
B3	Port Dover	4
B6	Dunnville	0
B2	Grimsby	4
B3	Port Dover	1
B2	Grimsby	4
B7	Hagersville	0
D1	New Hamburg	bye
D1	New Hamburg	4
D4	Tavistock	0
D4	Tavistock	4
D5	Woodstock	3
South - Doherty
D3	Norwich	4
D6	Paris	1
D2	Wellesley	4
D3	Norwich	1
D2	Wellesley	4
D7	Hespeler	0

Division final
B1	Glanbrook	4
B2	Grimsby	1
D1	New Hamburg	2
D2	Wellesley	4

Conference final
B1	Glanbrook	1
D2	Wellesley	4

Division quarterfinal	Division semifinal
S1	Essex	4
S8	Wallaceburg	0
S1	Essex	4
S5	Mooretown	2
S4	Blenheim	2
S5	Mooretown	4
West - Stobbs
S3	Wheatley	4
S6	Amherstburg	0
S2	Lakeshore	4
S3	Wheatley	2
S2	Lakeshore	4
S7	Dresden	0
Y1	Mount Brydges	4
Y8	Petrolia	0
Y1	Mount Brydges	4
Y4	Exeter	0
Y4	Exeter	4
Y5	Dorchester	2
West - Yeck
Y3	Thamesford	4
Y6	Lucan	0
Y2	North Middlesex	0
Y3	Thamesford	4
Y2	North Middlesex	4
Y7	Port Stanley	1

Division final
S1	Essex	1
S2	Lakeshore	4
Y1	Mount Brydges	3
Y3	Thamesford	4

Conference final
S2	Lakeshore	4
Y3	Thamesford	0

=== Round robin ===
May 5	Clarington Eagles	5-7	Wellesley Applejacks	Woolwich Memorial Centre	Recap
Owen Manarin - 5:14; Ryan Hall - 10:14		First period	3:34 - Tristan Romany; 15:57 - Curtis Butler
Dawson Manning - 2:32; Brady Darrach - 3:20; Jordan Shaw - 14:15		Second period	10:26 - Eric Lacey; 16:22 - Carson Wickie; 17:49 - Jake Clemmer
No scoring		Third period	12:12 - Carson Wickie; 16:05 - Isiah Katsube
Jude Rondina (24 saves / 29 shots); Marc-Oliver Robert (9 saves / 11 shots)		Goalie stats	Noah Bender (36 saves / 41 shots)

May 6	Wellesley Applejacks	1-4	Lakeshore Canadiens	Atlas Tube Centre	Recap
No scoring		First period	18:53 - Liam Sinasac; 19:31 - Marco Sladoje
No scoring		Second period	13:50 - Marco Sladoje
Evan Silveira - 14:03		Third period	19:36 - Bryce Scarlett
Noah Bender (31 saves / 34 shots)		Goalie stats	Romano Liburdi (24 saves / 25 shots)

May 6	Stayner Siskins	1-4	Clarington Eagles	Garnet B. Rickard Recreation Complex	Recap
No scoring		First period	5:34 - Jordan Shaw
Ty Roberts - 3:36		Second period	0:51 - Dawson Manning; 9:21 - Dawson Manning
No scoring		Third period	12:54 - Mitchell Davies
Derek Hartley (38 saves / 42 shots)		Goalie stats	Marc-Oliver Robert (47 saves / 48 shots)

May 7	Lakeshore Canadiens	2-4	Stayner Siskins	Stayner Memorial Arena	Recap
Spencer Higginbottom - 6:44		First period	13:04 - Gavin Mikaczo; 19:53 - Ethan Allair
Matthew Herniman - 8:58		Second period	No scoring
No scoring		Third period	10:32 - Ty Roberts; 19:30 - Gavin Mikaczo
Nicholas Bolton (25 saves / 29 shots)		Goalie stats	Derek Hartley (29 saves / 31 shots)

May 12	Wellesley Applejacks	5-3	Stayner Siskins	Woodstock District Community Complex	Recap
Curtis Butler - 3:08; Connor Doerbecker - 17:52; Kyle Baker - 18:18		First period	6:48 - Damen Boose
Isiah Katsube - 7:17		Second period	20:00 - Christopher Prucha
Kyle Baker - 0:33		Third period	5:27 - Deandres DeJesus
Noah Bender (23 saves / 26 shots)		Goalie stats	Derek Hartley (25 saves / 30 shots)

May 12	Clarington Eagles	4-0	Lakeshore Canadiens	Woodstock District Community Complex	Recap
Jordan Shaw - 20:00		First period	No scoring
Mitchell Davies - 6:46; Mitchell Davies - 15:33		Second period	No scoring
Hayes Bell - 16:20		Third period	No scoring
Jude Rondina (12 saves / 12 shots)		Goalie stats	Nicholas Bolton (30 saves / 34 shots)

=== Round-robin standings ===
Rank	Team	GP	W	L	Pts	GF	GA
1	Wellesley Applejacks	3	2	1	4	13	12
2	Clarington Eagles	3	2	1	4	13	8
3	Stayner Siskins	3	1	2	2	8	11
4	Lakeshore Canadiens	3	1	2	2	6	9

=== 2023 Schmalz Cup Finals ===
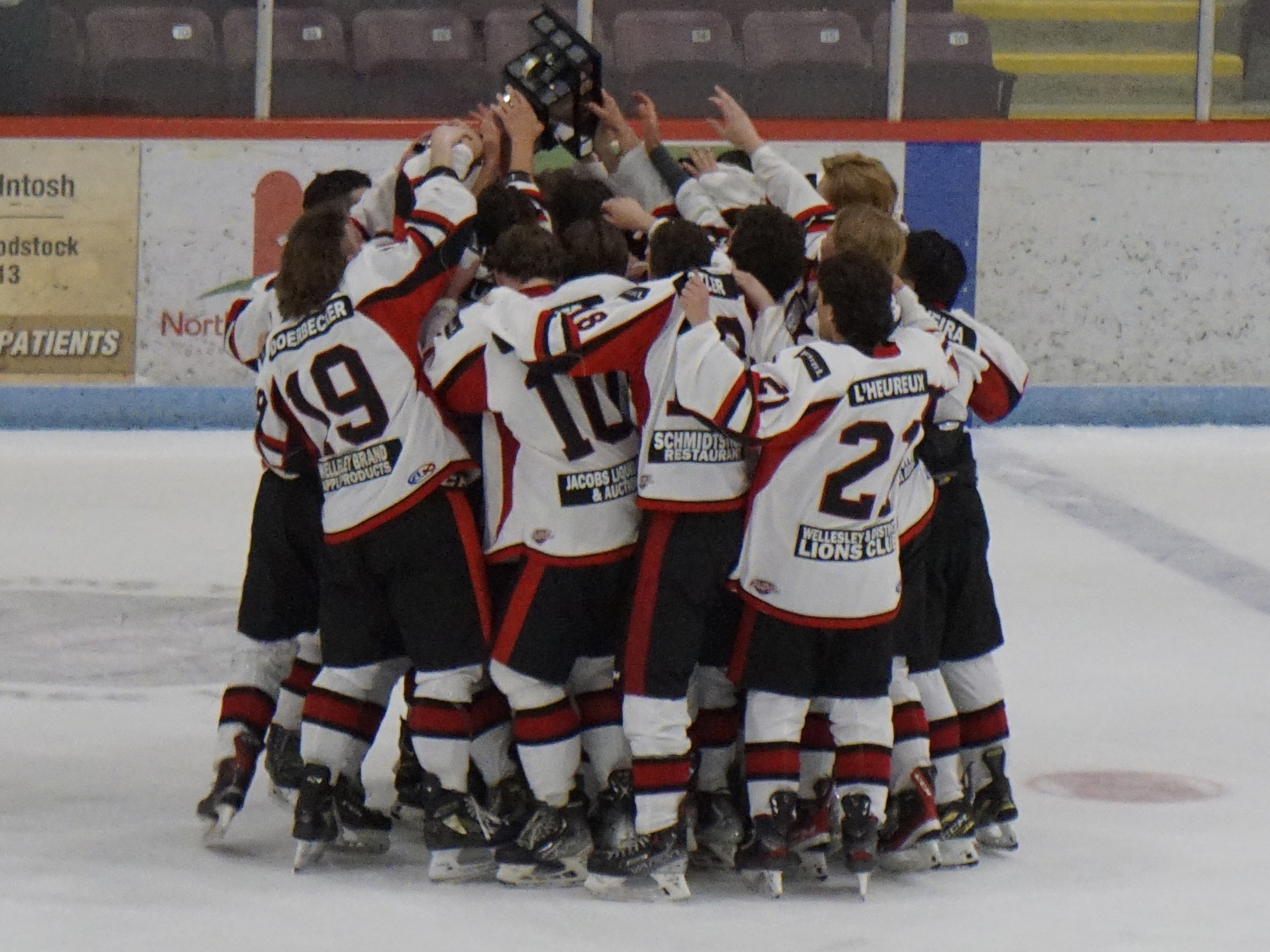
The Wellesley Applejacks winning the 2023 Schmalz Cup

Semi-final
1	Wellesley	3
4	Lakeshore	2
2	Clarington	2
3	Stayner	1

Final
1	Wellesley	3
2	Clarington	2

=== Semifinals ===
May 13	Lakeshore Canadiens	2-3	OT	Wellesley Applejacks	Woodstock District Community Complex	Recap
No scoring		First period		16:59 - Isiah Katsube
Matthew Herniman - 6:42		Second period		No scoring
Eric Bisson - 5:49		Third period		13:30 - Adam Hoff
No scoring		First overtime period		3:59 - Koby Seiling
Romano Liburdi (28 saves / 31 shots)		Goalie stats		Noah Bender (19 saves / 21 shots)

May 13	Stayner Siskins	1-2	Clarington Eagles	Woodstock District Community Complex	Recap
No scoring		First period	No scoring
Damen Boose - 3:42		Second period	No scoring
No scoring		Third period	6:43 - Mitchell Davies; 16:31 - Jordan Shaw
Derek Hartley (36 saves / 38 shots)		Goalie stats	Marc-Oliver Robert (25 saves / 26 shots)

=== Championship ===
May 14	Clarington Eagles	2-3	Wellesley Applejacks	Woodstock District Community Complex	Recap
No scoring		First period	No scoring
Adam Klaas - 15:24		Second period	1:24 - Isiah Katsube; 18:03 - Carson Wickie
Owen Manarin - 13:26		Third period	2:38 - Connor Doerbecker
Marc-Oliver Robert (21 saves / 24 shots)		Goalie stats	Noah Bender (26 saves / 28 shots)
