= Darrin Shannon =

Canadian ice hockey player

- Born: December 8, 1969 (age 56) Barrie, Ontario, Canada
- Height: 6 ft 2 in (188 cm)
- Weight: 205 lb (93 kg; 14 st 9 lb)
- Position: Left wing
- Shot: Left
- Played for: Buffalo Sabres; Winnipeg Jets; Phoenix Coyotes
- NHL draft: 4th overall, 1988; Pittsburgh Penguins
- Playing career: 1989–2000

Darrin Arthur Shannon (born December 8, 1969) is a Canadian former professional ice hockey player who played for the Buffalo Sabres and the Winnipeg Jets/Phoenix Coyotes.

Shannon was drafted fourth overall in the 1988 NHL entry draft. He recorded 87 goals and 163 assists for 250 points in 506 career NHL games.

== Personal life ==
Shannon is the younger brother of longtime NHL defenseman Darryl Shannon.

Shannon resides in Alliston, Ontario with his wife and three daughters, where he works as an investment manager.

== Awards and achievements ==
- Canadian Major Junior Scholastic Player of the Year (1988)
- Memorial Cup Tournament All-Star Team (1988)

== Career statistics ==
=== Regular season and playoffs ===
			Regular season					Playoffs
Season	Team	League	GP	G	A	Pts	PIM	GP	G	A	Pts	PIM
1984–85	Alliston Hornets	GMOHL	36	28	33	61	2	—	—	—	—	—
1985–86	Barrie Colts	CJHL	40	13	22	35	21	—	—	—	—	—
1986–87	Windsor Compuware Spitfires	OHL	60	17	41	58	31	14	4	6	10	8
1987–88	Windsor Compuware Spitfires	OHL	43	33	41	74	49	12	6	12	18	9
1988–89	Windsor Compuware Spitfires	OHL	54	33	48	81	47	4	1	6	7	2
1988–89	Buffalo Sabres	NHL	3	0	0	0	0	2	0	0	0	0
1989–90	Rochester Americans	AHL	50	20	23	43	25	9	4	1	5	2
1989–90	Buffalo Sabres	NHL	17	2	7	9	4	6	0	1	1	4
1990–91	Rochester Americans	AHL	49	26	34	60	56	10	3	5	8	22
1990–91	Buffalo Sabres	NHL	34	8	6	14	12	6	1	2	3	4
1991–92	Buffalo Sabres	NHL	1	0	1	1	0	—	—	—	—	—
1991–92	Winnipeg Jets	NHL	68	13	26	39	41	7	0	1	1	10
1992–93	Winnipeg Jets	NHL	84	20	40	60	91	6	2	4	6	6
1993–94	Winnipeg Jets	NHL	77	21	37	58	87	—	—	—	—	—
1994–95	Winnipeg Jets	NHL	19	5	3	8	14	—	—	—	—	—
1995–96	Winnipeg Jets	NHL	63	5	18	23	28	6	1	0	1	6
1996–97	Phoenix Coyotes	NHL	82	11	13	24	41	7	3	1	4	4
1997–98	Phoenix Coyotes	NHL	58	2	12	14	26	5	0	1	1	4
1998–99	Grand Rapids Griffins	IHL	10	1	5	6	12	—	—	—	—	—
1999–2000	St. John's Maple Leafs	AHL	8	2	0	2	2	—	—	—	—	—
1999–2000	Chicago Wolves	IHL	9	1	3	4	6	—	—	—	—	—
NHL totals			506	87	163	250	344	45	7	10	17	38
AHL totals			107	48	57	105	83	19	7	6	13	24

=== International ===
Year	Team	Event	GP	G	A	Pts	PIM
1989	Canada	WJC	7	1	3	4	10

Preceded by Chris Joseph	Pittsburgh Penguins first-round draft pick 1988	Succeeded by Jamie Heward
