= Sandy McCarthy =

- Born: June 15, 1972 (age 54) Toronto, Ontario, Canada
- Height: 6 ft 3 in (191 cm)
- Weight: 235 lb (107 kg; 16 st 11 lb)
- Position: Right wing
- Shot: Right
- Played for: Calgary Flames; Tampa Bay Lightning; Philadelphia Flyers; Carolina Hurricanes; New York Rangers; Boston Bruins
- NHL draft: 52nd overall, 1991; Calgary Flames
- Playing career: 1992–2004

Sandy McCarthy (born June 15, 1972) is a Canadian former professional ice hockey right winger who played 11 seasons in the National Hockey League (NHL) with the Calgary Flames, Tampa Bay Lightning, Philadelphia Flyers, Carolina Hurricanes, New York Rangers and Boston Bruins. During his career, he was known as an enforcer.

== Playing career ==
McCarthy grew up playing minor hockey in the Barrie Minor Hockey Association with the Flyers rep program. He began playing hockey in the Georgian Bay Junior C Hockey League with the Midland Centennials and the Central Junior A Hockey League for the Hawkesbury Hawks.

In May 1989, McCarthy was selected by the Niagara Falls Thunder in the 11th round (163rd overall) of the OHL Priority Selection. After not being signed by the Thunder, McCarthy's rights were waived to QMJHL Laval Titan where as a power forward, starred for 3 years - including a trip to the Memorial Cup in Hamilton in 1990.

McCarthy was selected by the Calgary Flames in the third round (52nd overall) of the 1991 NHL entry draft. Following his junior career, his next stop was during the 1992–93 season for the IHL's Salt Lake Golden Eagles. Throughout his career with the Flames he played the role as the enforcer, with many major fights.

While playing in the NHL, McCarthy became well known for incidents surrounding racial slurs. In the year 1998, McCarthy was accused of racial insensitivity in the form of gestures against Black-Canadian player Peter Worrell. Along with teammate Darcy Tucker, allegations were denied and the victim, Worrell, also confirmed he had not seen or heard any racial insults made towards him from either of the Tampa Bay players. McCarthy stated that growing up half aboriginal and half black, he would "never go there" because he had to go through racial taunts growing up. This alleged incident occurred during a game against the Florida Panthers while McCarthy was with Tampa Bay Lightning in 1998.

The following season in 1999, McCarthy was playing for the Philadelphia Flyers when he stated that Toronto Maple Leafs player Tie Domi made racial slurs towards him. Domi insisted this was a false accusation against him and went on to say he had no respect for McCarthy and would never partake in a fight with him. An NHL investigation was also conducted that reinforced Domi's denial.

As his time in the NHL progressed, he switched from his role as a power forward in junior hockey to more of a pressure player, offensively as well as defensively.

McCarthy played in Calgary for five years before being traded, in 1998, to the Tampa Bay Lightning, for a short stay. His next stop was with the Philadelphia Flyers for the next two seasons then a brief stint for the Carolina Hurricanes. McCarthy then moved on to the New York Rangers in August 2000 where he scored a career high 11 goals. The next season, he scored a career high in points with 23.

One of his more infamous fights happened while a member of the New York Rangers. In a game on November 8, 2001, against the New York Islanders, McCarthy challenged defenceman Eric Cairns to a fight which Cairns refused. Later in the shift, McCarthy scored and as McCarthy celebrated, Cairns gave him a jab to the jaw, which led to a fight between Cairns and Steve McKenna. While Cairns was in the penalty box, he was called chicken by Theoren Fleury who flapped his arms like a chicken to suggest that Cairns was afraid to fight McCarthy, who flexed his biceps and looked at Cairns. The next time the two teams played against each other on December 21, 2001 Cairns fought McCarthy and beat him.

McCarthy signed with the Boston Bruins during the summer of 2003 then was claimed off waivers at the 2004 trade deadline by the Rangers.

In 2012, McCarthy was inducted into the Barrie Sports Hall of Fame in Barrie, Ontario.

In his 735 games, 15 season NHL career, McCarthy recorded 72 goals, 76 assists and 1554 penalty minutes. In his 11 seasons in the NHL he made just over 7 million dollars, increasing his yearly amount each year he played.

== Coaching career ==
After 15 seasons in the NHL, McCarthy changed his focus from professional hockey to becoming an assistant head coach with the Woodstock Slammers, a Junior A team in New Brunswick. Andrew McCain, President of the Junior A team stated McCarthy was a "motivator who had strong beliefs in detection and discipline" which would help the team reach their goal of making it to the Royal Bank cup. In 2015, McCarthy became a part of the coaching staff of the team and later became the head coach.

== Personal life ==
Born in Toronto, McCarthy moved to Barrie, Ontario as a young boy and lived across the street from the rink in Allandale. He now lives in Woodstock, New Brunswick. He was previously the head coach of the Campbellton Tigers of the Maritime Hockey League but left in September 2021 to focus on his personal health. He was replaced as Head Coach by Charles Leblanc.

== Career statistics ==
			Regular season					Playoffs
Season	Team	League	GP	G	A	Pts	PIM	GP	G	A	Pts	PIM
1987–88	Midland Centennials	GBJHL	18	2	1	3	70	—	—	—	—	—
1988–89	Hawkesbury Hawks	CJHL	42	4	11	15	139	—	—	—	—	—
1989–90	Laval Titan	QMJHL	65	10	11	21	269	14	3	3	6	60
1990–91	Laval Titan	QMJHL	68	21	19	40	297	13	6	5	11	67
1991–92	Laval Titan	QMJHL	62	39	51	90	326	8	4	5	9	81
1992–93	Salt Lake Golden Eagles	IHL	77	18	20	38	220	—	—	—	—	—
1993–94	Calgary Flames	NHL	79	5	5	10	173	7	0	0	0	34
1994–95	Calgary Flames	NHL	37	5	3	8	101	6	0	1	1	17
1995–96	Calgary Flames	NHL	75	9	7	16	173	4	0	0	0	10
1996–97	Calgary Flames	NHL	33	3	5	8	113	—	—	—	—	—
1997–98	Calgary Flames	NHL	52	8	5	13	170	—	—	—	—	—
1997–98	Tampa Bay Lightning	NHL	14	0	5	5	71	—	—	—	—	—
1998–99	Tampa Bay Lightning	NHL	67	5	7	12	135	—	—	—	—	—
1998–99	Philadelphia Flyers	NHL	13	0	1	1	25	6	0	1	1	0
1999–2000	Philadelphia Flyers	NHL	58	6	5	11	111	—	—	—	—	—
1999–2000	Carolina Hurricanes	NHL	13	0	0	0	9	—	—	—	—	—
2000–01	New York Rangers	NHL	81	11	10	21	171	—	—	—	—	—
2001–02	New York Rangers	NHL	82	10	13	23	171	—	—	—	—	—
2002–03	New York Rangers	NHL	82	6	9	15	81	—	—	—	—	—
2003–04	Boston Bruins	NHL	37	3	1	4	28	—	—	—	—	—
2003–04	New York Rangers	NHL	13	1	0	1	2	—	—	—	—	—
NHL totals			736	72	76	148	1534	23	0	2	2	61

== Transactions ==
- March 24, 1998 – Traded by the Calgary Flames, along with Calgary's 1998 3rd and 5th round draft choices, to the Tampa Bay Lightning in exchange for Jason Wiemer.
- March 20, 1999 – Traded by the Tampa Bay Lightning, along with Mikael Andersson, to the Philadelphia Flyers in exchange for Colin Forbes and Philadelphia's 1999 4th round draft choice.
- March 14, 2000 – Traded by the Philadelphia Flyers to the Carolina Hurricanes in exchange for Kent Manderville.
- August 4, 2000 – Traded by the Carolina Hurricanes, along with Carolina's 2001 4th round draft choice, to the New York Rangers in exchange for Darren Langdon and Rob DiMaio.
- August 12, 2003 – Signed as a free agent with the Boston Bruins.
- March 9, 2004 – Claimed off waivers by the New York Rangers from the Boston Bruins.

Preceded by Adam Graves	Steven McDonald Extra Effort Award Winner; 2000–01 NHL season through 2001–02 NHL season	Succeeded by Matthew Barnaby
