= Huntsville Otters =

Canadian junior ice hockey team

- City: Huntsville, Ontario, Canada
- League: Provincial Junior Hockey League
- Conference: Northern
- Division: Carruthers
- Operated: 1990–present
- Home arena: Canada Summit Centre
- Colours: Blue, Yellow, and White
- General manager: Brian Crozier
- Head coach: Jason Farnsworth “Farmer”

Franchise history
- 1990–1997: Muskoka Bears
- 1997–2004: Huntsville Wildcats
- 2004–2007: Huntsville-Muskoka Otters
- 2007–present: Huntsville Otters

The Huntsville Otters are a Canadian Junior ice hockey team from Huntsville, Ontario. Starting from the 2016-17 season the Otters are members of the Provincial Junior Hockey League. Prior to this change they were members of the Georgian Mid-Ontario Junior C Hockey League after resigning from the Ontario Junior Hockey League in the Spring of 2012.

== History ==
Joining the ranks of Junior hockey in 1990, the Muskoka Bears were a member of the Metro Junior A Hockey League. Prior to this, the team had played Junior C hockey.

The team made hockey history on February 21, 1997 when their goalie, Ryan Venturelli, became the first goaltender to score two goals (both empty-net) in a hockey game against the Durham Huskies during the Metro Junior A Hockey League 1996–97 regular season.

From 1997 until 2004, the franchise was called the Huntsville Wildcats. The team never truly found their groove, and folded halfway through the 2003–04 season after 23 straight loses and a goals-against average of roughly 10.

For the 2004–05 Season, the team reformed as the Huntsville-Muskoka Otters after Sherwood Bassin, Ray Irwin and Tom McCarthy took ownership.

In 2007, the team was sold to local businessmen Kris House and Jason Armstrong, who shortened the team's name to the Huntsville Otters.

The town of Huntsville hosted the 2011 Ontario Junior A Dudley Hewitt Cup on the weekend of April 18–23, 2011 at the Don Lough Arena, Canada Summit Centre. The Otters went 3-0, and received a bye to the final but lost the championship to the Wellington Dukes 5-3.

In March 2012, it was announced that the Huntsville Otters were to be contracted from the Ontario Junior Hockey League when a local group successfully applied to bring the team to the Georgian Mid-Ontario Junior C Hockey League.

== Season-by-season results ==
Season	GP	W	L	T	OTL	GF	GA	P	Results	Playoffs
1990-91	44	5	39	0	-	116	356	10	12th Metro B	DNQ
1991-92	44	23	19	2	-	224	233	48	4th Metro A	Won quarter-final 4-3 (Buzzers); Lost semi-final 0-4 (Blues)
1992-93	48	27	17	4	-	251	223	58	3rd Metro A	Won quarter-final 4-2 (Eagles); Lost final 0-4 (Buzzers)
1993-94	50	28	14	8	-	246	183	64	3rd Metro A	Won quarter-final 4-2 (Buzzers); Lost semi-final 2-4 (Canadiens)
1994-95	50	23	26	1	-	256	223	47	8th Metro A	DNQ
1995-96	52	21	26	5	-	237	229	47	8th Metro A	Lost quarter-final 2-4 (Canadiens)
1996-97	50	14	34	2	-	200	298	30	11th Metro A	Lost Div semi-final 0-4 (Canadiens)
1997-98	50	18	28	4	-	157	209	40	12th Metro A	Lost Preliminary Round 1-3 (Rattlers
1998-99	51	9	37	4	1	142	323	23	12th OPJHL-C	
1999-00	49	21	20	6	2	181	198	50	6th OPJHL-N	Lost Div quarter-final 3-4 (Blues)
2000-01	49	9	35	2	3	121	290	23	7th OPJHL-N	Lost Div quarter-final 0-4 (Rattlers
2001-02	49	7	39	2	1	121	289	17	8th OPJHL-N	Lost Div quarter-final 0-4 (Hurricanes
2002-03	49	2	46	0	1	121	406	5	6th OPJHL-N	DNQ
2003-04	23	0	23	0	0	42	209	0	6th OPJHL-N	Folded
2004-05	49	23	23	2	1	177	207	49	4th OPJHL-N	Won Div quarter-final 4-1 (Blues); Lost Div semi-final 2-4 (Tigers)
2005-06	48	12	28	5	3	135	219	32	7th OPJHL-N	Lost Div quarter-final 1-4 (Hurricanes)
2006-07	48	20	21	4	3	182	186	47	4th OPJHL-N	Lost Div quarter-final 1-4 (Hurricanes)
2007-08	49	42	7	-	0	218	92	84	1st OPJHL-N	Lost Div semi-final 3-4 (Spirit)
2008-09	49	38	7	-	4	224	125	80	2nd OJHL-P	Won Div quarter-final 3-0 (Beehives); Won Div semi-final 4-2 (Tigers); Won Div final 4-1 (Crushers); Lost semi-final 1-4 (Voyageurs)
2009-10	56	22	31	-	3	229	236	47	11th OJAHL	DNQ
2010-11	50	25	17	-	8	175	144	58	4th OJHL-N	Lost Qualifier 0-2 (Flyers)
2011-12	49	18	26	-	5	175	205	41	5th OJHL-N	Lost Division quarter-final 0-3 (Waxers)
2012-13	40	8	30	-	2	122	260	18	9th GMOHL	Won Qualifier - 2-1 - (Devils); Lost quarter-final 0-4 (Hornets)
2013-14	40	8	29	-	3	96	186	19	9th GMOHL	Lost Qualifier, 0-2 (Devils)
2014-15	40	24	14	-	2	176	149	50	3rd GMOHL	Lost quarter-final 2-4 (Cougars)
2015-16	40	20	16	4	-	156	134	44	2nd of 9 GMOHL	Lost quarter-final 1-4 (Shamrocks)
2016-17	42	16	26	0	-	149	197	32	6th of 8-PJHL; Carruthers Div	Lost quarter-final 2-4 (Flyers)
2017-18	42	16	24	1	1	154	212	34	6th of 8-PJHL; Carruthers Div	Lost quarter-final 3-4 (Golden Hawks)
2018-19	42	15	24	2	1	138	191	33	7th of 8-PJHL; Carruthers Div	Lost quarter-final 0-4 (Hornets)
2019-20	42	11	30	1	0	113	208	23	8th of 8-PJHL; Carruthers Div	Lost quarter-final 0-4 (Hornets)
2020-21	Season Lost due too COVID-19 pandemic									
2021-22	30	2	27	0	1	52	166	5	8th of 8-PJHL; Carruthers Div	Lost quarter-final 0-4 (Siskins)
2022-23	40	17	21	1	1	132	159	36	6th of 9-PJHL; Carruthers Div	Lost quarter-final 0-4 (Cougars)
2023-24	42	17	23	1	1	121	150	36	6th of 9-PJHL; Carruthers Div	Lost quarter-final 0-4 (Terriers)
2024-25	42	16	24	2	0	127	203	34	5th of 8 Carruthers Div; 10th of 16 North Conf; 42nd of 63 - PJHL	Lost Div quarter-final 3-4 (Kings)
2025-26	42	12	28	2	0	104	192	26	7th of 8 Carruthers Div; 14th of 15 North Conf; 83rd of 61 - PJHL	Lost Div quarter-final 0-4 (Hornets)

=== Playoffs ===
Old Bears Logo

Old Wildcats Logo

Old Otters Logo

MetJHL Years

- 1991 DNQ
- 1992 Lost semi-final

Muskoka Bears defeated St. Michael's Buzzers 4-games-to-3
Bramalea Blues defeated Muskoka Bears 4-games-to-none

- 1993 Lost semi-final

Muskoka Bears defeated Aurora Eagles 4-games-to-2
St. Michael's Buzzers defeated Muskoka Bears 4-games-to-none

- 1994 Lost semi-final

Muskoka Bears defeated St. Michael's Buzzers 4-games-to-2
Caledon Canadians defeated Muskoka Bears 4-games-to-2

- 1995 DNQ
- 1996 Lost quarter-final

Caledon Canadians defeated Muskoka Bears 4-games-to-2

- 1997 Lost Preliminary

Caledon Canadians defeated Muskoka Bears 4-games-to-none

- 1998 Lost Preliminary

Thornhill Rattlers defeated Huntsville Wildcats 3-games-to-1

OJHL Years

- 1999 DNQ
- 2000 Lost Division Quarter-final

Collingwood Blues defeated Huntsville Wildcats 4-games-to-3

- 2001 Lost Division Quarter-final

Thornhill Rattlers defeated Huntsville Wildcats 4-games-to-none

- 2002 Lost Division Quarter-final

Newmarket Hurricanes defeated Huntsville Wildcats 4-games-to-none

- 2003 DNQ
- 2004 Did Not Finish Season
- 2005 Lost Division Semi-final

Huntsville-Muskoka Otters defeated Collingwood Blues 4-games-to-1
Aurora Tigers defeated Huntsville-Muskoka Otters 4-games-to-2

- 2006 Lost Division Quarter-final

Newmarket Hurricanes defeated Huntsville-Muskoka Otters 4-games-to-1

- 2007 Lost Division Quarter-final

Newmarket Hurricanes defeated Huntsville-Muskoka Otters 4-games-to-1

- 2008 Lost Division Semi-final

Stouffville Spirit defeated Huntsville Otters 4-games-to-3

- 2009 Lost Conference Final

Huntsville Otters defeated Toronto Dixie Beehives 3-games-to-none
Huntsville Otters defeated Aurora Tigers 4-games-to-2
Huntsville Otters defeated Orangeville Crushers 4-games-to-1
Kingston Voyageurs defeated Huntsville Otters 4-games-to-1

- 2010 DNQ OJAHL Playoffs
- 2011 Lost Qualifier, Hosted and Lost Dudley Hewitt Cup Final

Orangeville Flyers defeated Huntsville Otters 2-games-to-none
First in Dudley Hewitt Cup round robin (3-0)
Wellington Dukes defeated Huntsville Otters 5-3 in final

- 2012 Lost Division Quarter-final

Markham Waxers defeated Huntsville Otters 3-games-to-none
