= Darryl Shannon =

Canadian ice hockey player

- Born: June 21, 1968 (age 57) Barrie, Ontario, Canada
- Height: 6 ft 2 in (188 cm)
- Weight: 205 lb (93 kg; 14 st 9 lb)
- Position: Defence
- Shot: Left
- Played for: Toronto Maple Leafs; Winnipeg Jets; Buffalo Sabres; Atlanta Thrashers; Calgary Flames; Montreal Canadiens
- NHL draft: 36th overall, 1986; Toronto Maple Leafs
- Playing career: 1988–2004

Darryl Jackson Shannon (born June 21, 1968) is a Canadian former professional ice hockey player. He was drafted 36th overall by the Toronto Maple Leafs in the 1986 NHL entry draft and as well as the Leafs, he played for the Winnipeg Jets, Buffalo Sabres, Atlanta Thrashers, Calgary Flames, and the Montreal Canadiens. Despite a serious illness, he played a total of 544 regular season games in the National Hockey League, scoring 28 goals and 111 assists for 139 points and collecting 523 penalty minutes. He also played 29 playoff games, all with the Buffalo Sabres, scoring 4 goals and 7 assists for 11 points, collecting 16 minutes. He moved to Germany in 2001 to play in the Deutsche Eishockey Liga for the Krefeld Pinguine and the Eisbären Berlin. He is the older brother of fellow former NHLer Darrin Shannon who played together while with the Winnipeg Jets.

Following his retirement, he lives in Buffalo, New York where he is an active member of the Sabres Alumni Association.

== Career statistics ==
=== Regular season and playoffs ===
			Regular season					Playoffs
Season	Team	League	GP	G	A	Pts	PIM	GP	G	A	Pts	PIM
1983–84	Alliston Hornets	COJCHL	30	18	22	40	70	—	—	—	—	—
1984–85	Richmond Hill Dynes	OJHL	1	0	0	0	0	—	—	—	—	—
1984–85	Barrie Colts	COJHL	39	5	23	28	50	—	—	—	—	—
1985–86	Windsor Compuware Spitfires	OHL	57	6	21	27	52	16	5	6	11	22
1986–87	Windsor Compuware Spitfires	OHL	64	23	27	50	83	14	4	8	12	18
1987–88	Windsor Compuware Spitfires	OHL	60	16	70	86	116	12	3	8	11	17
1988–89	Toronto Maple Leafs	NHL	14	1	3	4	6	—	—	—	—	—
1988–89	Newmarket Saints	AHL	61	5	24	29	37	5	0	3	3	10
1989–90	Toronto Maple Leafs	NHL	10	0	1	1	12	—	—	—	—	—
1989–90	Newmarket Saints	AHL	47	4	15	19	58	—	—	—	—	—
1990–91	Toronto Maple Leafs	NHL	10	0	1	1	0	—	—	—	—	—
1990–91	Newmarket Saints	AHL	47	2	14	16	51	—	—	—	—	—
1991–92	Toronto Maple Leafs	NHL	48	2	8	10	23	—	—	—	—	—
1992–93	Toronto Maple Leafs	NHL	16	0	0	0	11	—	—	—	—	—
1992–93	St. John's Maple Leafs	AHL	7	1	1	2	4	—	—	—	—	—
1993–94	Winnipeg Jets	NHL	20	0	4	4	18	—	—	—	—	—
1993–94	Moncton Hawks	AHL	37	1	10	11	62	20	1	7	8	32
1994–95	Winnipeg Jets	NHL	40	5	9	14	48	—	—	—	—	—
1995–96	Winnipeg Jets	NHL	48	2	7	9	72	—	—	—	—	—
1995–96	Buffalo Sabres	NHL	26	2	6	8	20	—	—	—	—	—
1996–97	Buffalo Sabres	NHL	82	4	19	23	112	12	2	3	5	8
1997–98	Buffalo Sabres	NHL	76	3	19	22	56	—	—	—	—	—
1998–99	Buffalo Sabres	NHL	71	3	12	15	52	2	0	0	0	0
1999–00	Atlanta Thrashers	NHL	49	5	13	18	65	—	—	—	—	—
1999–00	Calgary Flames	NHL	27	1	8	9	22	—	—	—	—	—
2000–01	Montreal Canadiens	NHL	7	0	1	1	6	—	—	—	—	—
2000–01	Quebec Citadelles	AHL	4	0	1	1	4	—	—	—	—	—
2001–02	Krefeld Pinguine	DEL	38	1	18	19	49	3	1	1	2	0
2002–03	Krefel Pinguine	DEL	52	3	9	12	56	14	3	4	7	20
2003–04	Eisbären Berlin	DEL	48	6	7	13	26	11	1	3	4	8
NHL totals			544	28	111	139	523	29	4	7	11	16
