= Stayner Siskins =

Canadian junior ice hockey team

- City: Stayner, Ontario
- League: Provincial Junior Hockey League
- Founded: 1972
- Home arena: Stayner Memorial Arena
- Colours: Green, Yellow, and White
- General manager: Henry Barton 2025-26
- Head coach: Dave Kelly 2025-26
- Parent club: Collingwood Blues

The Stayner Siskins are a Canadian Junior ice hockey team based in Stayner, Ontario. They were members of the Georgian Mid-Ontario Junior C Hockey League until 2016 when it merged into the Provincial Junior Hockey League.

== History ==
The Stayner Siskins began their journey in 1972 as a member of the South-Central Junior D Hockey League. The next year, the league was promoted and became the Central Ontario Junior C Hockey League. In these early years, the Siskins were not overly successful in their league, but during the playoff were sent out to represent the league in the All-Ontario Junior "D" playdowns for the Ontario Hockey Association Cup.

The Siskins first appearance in the All-Ontario Junior D championship came during the 1973-74 season. This year saw the beginning of a three-year rivalry with the Belmont Bombers of the Western Ontario Junior D Hockey League. In the 1974 final, the Siskins, led by veteran captain Kevin McInnis, dropped the Bombers 4-games-to-2 to win their first OHA Cup.

The next year saw the Siskins make their second appearance. Again the Belmont Bombers were in town, but they were ready this time. The Bombers dispatched the Stayner Siskins 4-games-to-1.

In 1975-76, the Stayner Siskins and Belmont Bombers met for the third and final time. The Siskins and Bombers both came out to win, as the series went the distance the Siskins took the decisive game 7 and the series 4-games-to-3. It is doubtful that these two franchises have ever met since outside of tournament or exhibition play.

In 1976, the Central Ontario Junior C Hockey League became the Mid-Ontario Junior C Hockey League. The 1976-77 playoffs saw Stayner reach the Ontario Hockey Association Cup final again, but this time against the Western league's Exeter Hawks. The Hawks proved too much for the Siskins to handle as they swept Stayner 4-games-to-none.

In 1992, the Stayner Siskins won the Mid-Ontario Junior C Hockey League championship. They entered the All-Ontario playdowns and made it all the way to the Clarence Schmalz Cup final but lost to the Great Lakes Junior C Hockey League's powerhouse Belle River Canadiens. The Siskins won the last Mid-Ontario league championship in 1994, but did not advance to the All-Ontario final.

In 1994, the Mid-Ontario league merged with Georgian Bay Junior C Hockey League to create the Georgian Mid-Ontario Junior C Hockey League. It took Stayner until the 2001-02 to win the title of this new league and they won it again in 2003-04. They were not able to reach the Clarence Schmalz Cup on either campaign.

The 2005-06 season saw the Siskins finish sixth place at the end of the regular season. The Siskins drew the third seeded Alliston Hornets. The Siskins played spoiler in a huge way. The Hornets were heavily favoured to win the series and had built up a 3-games-to-none lead. Out of nowhere, the Siskins won games 4, 5, 6, and finally game 7 to pull the ultimate upset and advance to the league semi-finals. The Siskins fell to the eventual provincial champions, the Penetang Kings managed to defeat them 4-games-to-1.

The 2006-07 season had the Siskins finish fifth place in the league and draw the fourth seeded Erin Shamrocks in the league quarter-finals. The Siskins upset the Shamrocks and won the series 4-games-to-2. They then ran into the first seeded Fergus Devils and fell to the Devils 4-games-to-1.

== Season-by-season standings ==
Season	GP	W	L	T	OTL	GF	GA	P	Results	Playoffs
1972-73	27	13	9	5	-	130	96	37	3rd SCJDHL	Lost semi-final
1973-74	30	19	8	3	-	186	123	41	2nd Central G1	Jr. D Champions, won OHA Cup
1974-75	30	25	5	0	-	168	92	50	1st Central G1	Jr. D Champions, lost OHA Cup Final
1975-76	32	26	4	2	-	176	95	54	1st Central G1	Jr. D Champions, won OHA Cup
1976-77	26	19	4	3	-	227	100	41	1st MOJCHL	Jr. D Champions, lost OHA Cup Final
1977-78	32	13	14	5	-	153	145	31	6th MOJCHL	
1978-79	32	10	18	4	-	--	--	24	6th MOJCHL	
1979-80	Statistics missing									
1980-81	27	19	6	2	-	192	126	40	1st NJDHL	
1981-82	Statistics missing									
1982-83	34	24	9	1	-	--	--	49	3rd GBJCHL	Lost quarter-final
1983-84	32	11	15	6	-	--	--	28	7th GBJCHL	Lost quarter-final
1984-85	31	11	19	1	-	162	216	23	6th GBJCHL	Lost quarter-final
1985-86	32	17	10	3	2	185	166	39	3rd GBJCHL	Lost semi-final
1986-87	32	27	2	1	2	266	128	57	1st GBJCHL	Lost final
1987-88	30	27	2	0	1	238	96	55	1st GBJCHL	Won semi-final (Bruins); Won League (Blair McCann); Lost CSC quarter-final (Barons)
1988-89	36	21	14	1	0	224	178	43	3rd GBJCHL	Won semi-final 4-0 (Centennials); Won League; Lost CSC quarter-final 2-4 (Barons)
1989-90	36	19	14	2	1	172	163	41	4th GBJCHL	Lost semi-final 0-4 (Brewers)
1990-91	30	24	5	1	0	163	93	49	1st GBJCHL	Lost semi-final 1-4 (Kings)
1991-92	36	32	4	0	0	--	--	64	1st GBJCHL	Won semi-final 5-0 (Huskies); Won LeagueWon CSC quarter-final 4-0 (Crushers); Won CSC semi-final 4-1 (Mojacks); Lost CSC Final 2-4 (Canadiens)
1992-93	35	28	5	1	1	--	--	58	1st GBJCHL	Won semi-final 4-1 (Kings); Won League 4-1 (Bruins); Lost CSC quarter-final 1-4 (Crushers)
1993-94	37	31	3	1	2	--	--	65	1st GBJCHL	Won quarter-final 4-0 (Centennials) 'Won League 4-0 (Bruins); Lost CSC quarter-final 1-4 (Patriots)
1994-95	36	21	15	0	-	--	--	42	4th GMOHL	Lost quarter-final 0-4 (Bulls)
1995-96	44	32	10	2	-	247	149	66	1st GMOHL	Won semi-final 4-0 (Cubs); Won League 4-0 (Kings); Lost CSC quarter-final 1-4 (Patriots)
1996-97	36	23	13	0	-	206	154	46	2nd GMOHL	Lost quarter-final 0-3 (Devils)
1997-98	36	20	16	0	-	166	149	40	3rd GMOHL	Lost quarter-final 1-3 (Shamrocks)
1998-99	36	24	10	2	-	173	149	50	1st GMOHL	Won quarter-final 4-0 (Hornets); Lost semi-final 0-4 (Devils)
1999-00	36	25	10	1	-	169	104	51	2nd GMOHL	Won quarter-final 4-0 (Hornets); Won semi-final 4-2 (Bulls); Lost final 0-4 (Devils)
2000-01	36	31	5	0	0	189	64	62	1st GMOHL	Won quarter-final 4-0 (Shamrocks); Won semi-final 4-3 (Kings); Lost final 2-4 (Devils)
2001-02	36	24	11	1	0	169	109	49	1st GMOHL	Won quarter-final 4-0 (Bulls); Won semi-final 4-0 (Kings); Won League 4-0 (Shamrocks); Lost CSC quarter-final 0-4 (Bulldogs)
2002-03	36	24	9	1	2	175	106	51	1st GMOHL	Won quarter-final 4-1 (Flyers); Won semi-final 4-2 (Kings); Lost final 2-4 (Cougars)
2003-04	36	22	10	2	2	163	105	48	2nd GMOHL	Won quarter-final 4-0 (Hornets); Won semi-final 4-0 (Kings); Won League 4-3 (Shamrocks); Lost CSC quarter-final 3-4 (Ironmen)
2004-05	40	19	16	4	1	116	105	43	6th GMOHL	Lost quarter-final 2-4 (Kings)
2005-06	41	15	17	8	1	156	144	39	6th GMOHL	Won quarter-final 4-3 (Hornets); Lost semi-final 1-4 (Kings)
2006-07	42	21	16	5	0	164	170	47	5th GMOHL	Won quarter-final 4-2 (Shamrocks); Lost semi-final 1-4 (Devils)
2007-08	42	8	33	0	1	114	236	17	6th GMOHL	Lost quarter-final 1-4 (Devils)
2008-09	42	15	24	-	3	131	201	33	4th GMOHL	Won quarter-final 4-3 (Cougars); Lost semi-final 0-4 (Hornets)
2009-10	41	26	10	-	5	178	119	57	3rd GMOHL	Won quarter-final 4-0 (Flyers); Lost semi-final 3-4 (Kings)
2010-11	40	30	10	-	0	196	108	60	3rd GMOHL	Won quarter-final 4-0 (Cougars); Won semi-final 4-1 (Shamrocks); Lost final 3-4 (Hornets)
2011-12	40	32	6	-	2	219	112	66	1st GMOHL	Won quarter-final 4-0 (Devils); Won semi-final 4-0 (Flyers); Lost final 0-4 (Hornets)
2012-13	40	26	11	-	3	182	135	55	2nd GMOHL	Won quarter-final 4-0 (Cougars); Lost semi-final - 1-4 - (Flyers)
2013-14	40	26	10	-	4	186	113	56	3rd GMOHL	Won quarter-final 4-3 (Shamrocks); Lost semi-final - 0-4 - (Hornets)
2014-15	40	28	6	-	6	184	137	62	2nd GMOHL	Lost quarter-final 2-4 (Terriers)
2015-16	40	18	17	5	-	146	158	41	4th of 9 GMOHL	Lost quarter-final 2-4 (Golden Hawks)
2016-17	42	39	3	0	-	282	146	102	1st of 8-PJHL; Carruthers Div	Won quarter-final 1-4 (Golden Hawks); Won semi-final 4-0 (Flyers); Lost final 0-4 (Hornets)
2017-18	42	40	2	0	-	299	81	80	1st of 8-PJHL; Carruthers Div	Won quarter-final 4-0 (Terriers); Won semi-final 4-2 (Kings); Won Final 4-1 (Hornets); Won North Conference Final 4-1 (Patriots); Lost CSC semi-final 3-4 (Chiefs)
2018-19	42	31	7	2	2	229	137	66	1st of 8-PJHL; Carruthers Div	Won quarter-final 4-1 (Cougars); Lost div semi-final 0-4 (Kings)
2019-20	42	28	14	0	0	193	163	56	2nd of 8-PJHL; Carruthers Div	Won quarter-final 4-1 (Flyers) won semi-final 4-3 (Kings) incomplete 0-1 (Hornets) remaining playoffs cancelled covid
2020-21	Season Lost due to COVID-19 pandemic									
2021-22	30	25	4	0	1	195	72	51	1st of 8-PJHL; Carruthers Div	Won quarter-final 0-3 (Otters); Won semi-final 4-3 (Hornets); Won League 4-0 (Cougars); Won North Conference Final 4-2 (Hawks); Advance to CSC finals (see below)
2022-23	40	36	4	0	0	212	74	72	1st of 9-PJHL; Carruthers Div	Won quarter-final 4-0 (Kings); Won semi-final 4-0 (Terriers); Won League 4-1 (Hornets); Won North Conference 4-2 (Patriots) (Advance to Schmalz Cup Finals)
2023-24	42	33	9	0	0	211	109	66	2nd of 9-PJHL; Carruthers Div	Won quarter-final 4-0 (Golden Hawks); Won semi-final 4-0 (Terriers); Lost final 0-4 (Hornets)
2024-25	42	29	12	0	1	215	123	59	3rd of 8 Carruthers Div; 5th of 16 North Conf; 16th of 63 PJHL	Won quarter-final 4-1 (Spartans); Lost semi-final 1-4 (Terriers)
2025-26	42	32	9	1	0	204	122	65	1st of 8 Carruthers Div; 3rd of 15 North Conf; 6th of 61 PJHL	Won quarter-final 4-0 (Spartans); Won semi-final 4-0 (Flyers); Won Div Finals 4-2 (Hornets); Lost N Conf final 0-4 (Whalers)

== Clarence Schmalz Cup appearances ==
1992: Belle River Canadiens defeated Stayner Siskins 4-games-to-2

== Clarence Schmalz Cup Championships ==
Year	Round Robin	Record	Standing	Semifinal	Gold Medal Game
2022	W, Clarington Eagles 3-0; L, Lakeshore Canadiens 1-5; OTW, Grimsby Peach Kings 3-2	2-1-0-0	3rd of 4	L, Clarington Eagles 1-4	n/a
2023	L, Clarington Eagles 1-4; W, Lakeshore Canadiens 4-2; L, Wellesley Applejacks 3-5	1-2-0-0	3rd of 4	L, Clarington Eagles 1-2	n/a

== Notable alumni ==
- Jason Arnott
- Steve Walker
