= Fergus Whalers =

Canadian junior ice hockey team

- City: Fergus, Ontario
- League: Provincial Junior Hockey League
- Division: Pollock (North Conf)
- Home arena: Centre Wellington Community Sportsplex
- Colours: green, Royalblue, and White
- General manager: Craig Dool
- Head coach: Ryan Black

Franchise history
- 1971-1987: Fergus Green Machine
- 1990-2015: Fergus Devils
- 2023-Present: Fergus Whalers

Championships
- League champions: NJDHL: 1980; GMOHL: 1995, 1999, 2000, and 2001
- Clarence Schmalz Cups: 2026

The Fergus Whalers are a Junior ice hockey team based in Fergus, Ontario, Canada. They played in the PJHL, joining the league as an expansion franchise prior to the 2023-24. The team will play in the Pollock Division of the North Conference.

The Whalers will be a continuation of Fergus involvement in junior hockey taking the place of the Fergus Devils who were a Junior ice hockey team that played in the former Georgian Mid-Ontario Junior C Hockey League (now a part of the PJHL). They took a leave of absence for the 2015/16 season and have not returned.

== History ==
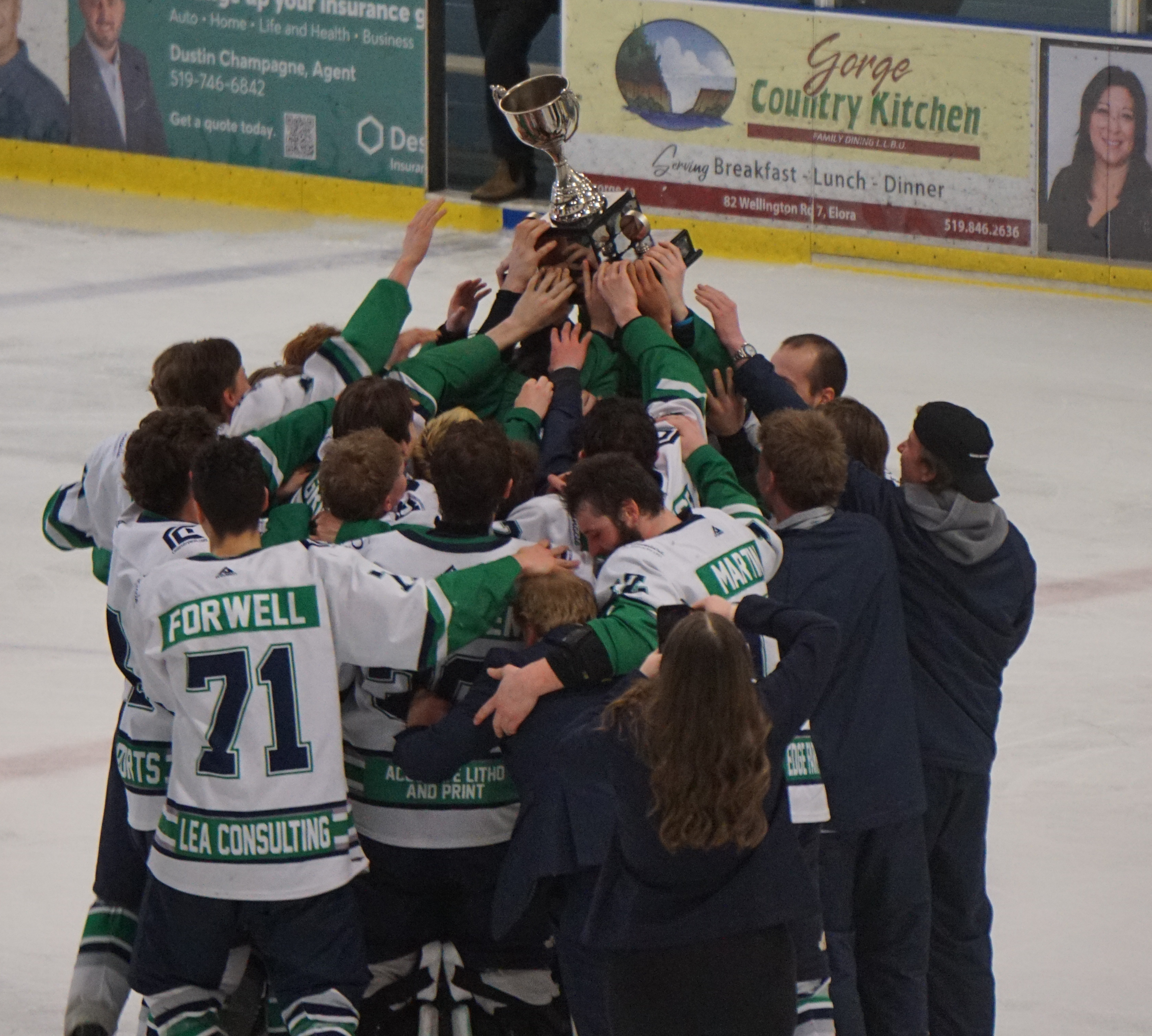
The Fergus Whalers winning the 2026 Schmalz Cup at the Centre Wellington Community Sportsplex in Fergus, Ontario.

The Fergus Green Machine were founded in 1971 in the South-Central Junior D Hockey League. In 1973, the league was promoted to the Central Ontario Junior C Hockey League. In 1974, the team seemed to have dropped off the map, but it turns out they had probably dropped to the fairly local Northern Junior D Hockey League. In 1979-80, while in the Northern, the Green Machine picked up a 16-year-old Scottish defenseman named James Stephen Smith. Smith led the team to a league championship, and all the way to the Ontario Hockey Association Cup final against the Belmont Bombers of the Western Ontario Junior D Hockey League. The Bombers knocked off the Machine 2-games-to-none in a best-of-3 series to win the All-Ontario championship. Smith went on to play three seasons of Ontario Hockey League hockey with the London Knights before eventually winning three Stanley Cups with the National Hockey League's Edmonton Oilers.

In 1983, the Green Machine returned to their old Junior "C" loop, now known as the Mid-Ontario Junior C Hockey League. The Northern Junior D Hockey League folded two seasons later without the Fergus franchise. In 1987 the Green Machine folded.

In 1990, the town of Fergus resurrected the team as the Fergus Devils. Still in the Mid-Ontario Junior C Hockey League, the Devils played two seasons of interlock with the Western Junior C Hockey League. Two years later, the Mid-Ontario merged with the Georgian Bay Junior C Hockey League to form the Georgian Mid-Ontario Junior C Hockey League. It is unknown if the Devils won any Mid-Ontario championships. The Devils found their niche in the new league and won the league title in 1995, 1999, 2000, and 2001. The Devils have never reached the Clarence Schmalz Cup finals.

The 2005-06 season saw the Devils finish in second play in the Georgian Mid-Ontario. In the league quarter-final, the Devils laid out the seventh-seeded Bradford Bulls 4 games to none. With a head of steam, the Devils played the fourth seeded Erin Shamrocks in the semi-final. The result was a 4-games-to-1 series win for the Devils. In the finals, the Devils locked horns with the first seed Penetang Kings. The Devils were no match for the Kings as Penetang swept the series 4-games-to-none to win the league championship. The Kings went on to win the Clarence Schmalz Cup.

In 2006-07, a late season surge saw the Fergus Devils surpass the Alliston Hornets and Penetang Kings to gain the top seed in the league. As the Bradford Bulls had left the league to try their chances on an Independent Junior A league, the Devils received a bye in the league quarter-finals. The well rested Devils took on the fifth seeded Stayner Siskins in the league semi-final and beat them 4-games-to-1. Again in the finals, the Devils again faced the Penetang Kings. The Kings went up 2-games-to-none on the Devils with a pair of double overtime victories. The Devils came back ane won game 3 and 4 just to lose game 5 and 6. For the second straight year the Penetang Kings beat the Devils for the league title and again went on to win the Clarence Schmalz Cup.

The Devils folded following the 2014/15 season.

Prior to the start of the 2023-24 Provincial Junior Hockey League season, Jason Baier secured a new franchise and introduced the Fergus Whalers. The team competed in the North Conference and the Pollock Division.

== Season-by-season standings ==
Season	GP	W	L	T	OTL	GF	GA	P	Results	Playoffs
1971-72	30	21	6	3	-	215	107	45	1st SCJDHL	Won league, lost OHA Cup SF
1972-73	29	21	3	5	-	214	132	49	1st SCJDHL	Lost final
1973-74	30	2	25	3	-	114	239	7	7th Central G1	DNQ
1974-75	28	10	15	3	-	158	164	25	5th of 7 NJDHL	DNQ
1975-76	28	16	9	3	-	162	133	35	4th of 8 NJDHL	Lost semi-final, 1-4 (Ironmen)
1976-77	24	14	6	4	-	164	129	32	2nd of 5 NJDHL	Won semi-final, 4-1 (Ironmen)
1977-78										
1978-79	34	22	8	4	-	230	155	48	2nd NJDHL	
1979-80										
1980-81	30	12	15	3	-	158	198	27	4th WOJCHL	
1981-82	30	13	14	3	-	168	164	29	5th WOJCHL	
1982-83	Did not participate									
1983-84	34	12	21	1	-	166	202	25	6th MOJCHL	Lost quarter-final 1-3 (Hornets)
1984-85	36	23	12	1	-	224	135	45	2nd MOJCHL	Lost quarter-final 0-3 (Crushers)
1985-86	34	20	14	0	-	183	178	40	3rd MOJCHL	
1986-87	33	21	11	1	-	235	166	43	2nd MOJCHL	Won quarter-final 4-0 (Harvesters); Won semi-final 4-1 (Crushers); Lost final 0-4 (Blues)
1987-90	Did not participate									
1990-91	34	3	31	0	-	--	--	6	6th MOJCHL	Lost quarter-final 1-4 (Sabres)
1991-92	34	7	24	3	-	136	220	17	6th MOJCHL	Won quarter-final 4-1 (Hornets); Lost semi-final 0-4 (Crushers)
1992-93	38	19	14	4	1	200	187	43	2nd MOJCHL	no data
1993-94	40	18	21	1	-	233	248	37	4th MOJCHL	Lost quarter-final (Shamrocks)
1994-95	36	21	14	1	-	--	--	43	3rd GMOHL	Won quarter-final 4-0 (Shamrocks); Won semi-final 4-3 (Hornets); Won League 4-0 (Kings); Lost CSC quarter-final (Patriots)
1995-96	44	18	24	2	-	204	226	38	7th GMOHL	DNQ
1996-97	36	16	20	0	-	171	162	32	7th GMOHL	Won quarter-final 3-0 (Siskins); Won semi-final 4-1 (Bulls); Lost final 3-4 (Cubs)
1997-98	36	22	14	0	-	159	123	44	2nd GMOHL	Won quarter-final 3-2 (Cubs); Lost semi-final 2-4 (Bulls)
1998-99	36	25	9	2	-	178	130	52	2nd GMOHL	Won quarter-final 4-1 (Shamrocks); Won semi-final 4-0 (Siskins); Won League 4-2 (Flyers); Lost CSC quarter-final 3-4 (Bulldogs)
1999-00	36	31	5	0	-	226	123	62	1st GMOHL	Won quarter-final 4-0 (Hornets); Won semi-final 4-1 (Cubs); Won League 4-0 (Siskins); Lost CSC quarter-final 3-4 (Bulldogs)
2000-01	36	22	11	1	2	185	140	45	2nd GMOHL	Won quarter-final 4-0 (Hornets); Won semi-final 4-3 (Flyers); Won League 4-2 (Siskins); Lost CSC quarter-final 1-4 (Barons)
2001-02	36	21	11	2	2	165	135	46	3rd GMOHL	Won quarter-final 4-3 (Cougars); Lost semi-final 0-4 (Shamrocks)
2002-03	36	17	18	1	0	126	130	35	6th GMOHL	Lost quarter-final 1-4 (Cougars)
2003-04	36	16	17	1	2	165	178	35	5th GMOHL	Lost quarter-final 1-4 (Kings)
2004-05	40	25	10	4	1	160	117	55	2nd GMOHL	Won quarter-final 4-2 (Cougars); Lost semi-final 2-4 (Kings)
2005-06	42	25	9	5	3	170	128	58	2nd GMOHL	Won quarter-final 4-0 (Hornets); Won semi-final 4-1 (Shamrocks); Lost final 0-4 (Kings)
2006-07	41	29	7	3	2	220	104	63	1st GMOHL	Quarter-final BYE; Won semi-final 4-1 (Siskins); Lost final 2-4 (Kings)
2007-08	42	27	11	1	3	208	147	58	3rd GMOHL	Won quarter-final 4-1 (Siskins); Lost semi-final 2-4 (Kings)
2008-09	42	14	27	-	1	134	202	29	6th GMOHL	Lost quarter-final 0-4 (Shamrocks)
2009-10	42	13	26	-	3	133	219	29	5th GMOHL	Lost quarter-final 3-4 (Shamrocks)
2010-11	40	13	25	-	2	132	174	28	7th GMOHL	Lost quarter-final 1-4 (Shamrocks)
2011-12	40	2	38	-	0	79	267	4	8th GMOHL	Lost quarter-final 0-4 (Siskins)
2012-13	40	12	27	-	1	89	165	25	8th GMOHL	DNQ
2013-14	40	17	19	-	4	143	170	38	8th GMOHL	Lost quarter-final 0-4 (Hornets)
2014-15	40	16	20	-	4	130	169	36	8th GMOHL	Lost quarter-final 0-4 (Hornets)
2015-16	LEAVE OF ABSENCE									
2016-17	Assumed to have folded the franchise									
Fergus Whalers
2023-24	42	20	17	3	2	152	135	45	4th of 8 Pollock Div-PJHL	Won Div.quarterfinal, 4-0 (Capitals); Lost Div Semifinals, 2-4 (Barons)
2024-25	42	27	10	3	2	176	116	59	3rd of 8 Pollock Div; 6th of 15 North Conf; 18th of 63-PJHL	Won Div.quarterfinal, 4-1 (Hawks); Won Div Semifinals 4-1 (Patriots); Lost Div Final 1-4 (Barons)
2025-26	42	34	7	1	0	253	103	69	1st of 8 Pollock Div; 1st of 15 North Conf; 3rd of 61-PJHL	bye Div.quarterfinal, 0-0; Won Div Semifinals 4-0 (Bulldogs); Won Div Finals 4-1 (Barons); Won N Conf Finals 4-0 (Siskins); Won Schmalz Cup Semi-Finals 4-1 (Huskies); Won Schmalz Cup Finals 4-1 (Braves)

== Clarence Schmalz Cup appearances ==
2026: Fergus Whalers defeated Tavistock Braves 4-games-to-1

== Notable alumni ==
- James Stephen Smith
- Chris Driscoll (NLL Pro lacrosse player)
- Greg Jacina
