= Orillia Terriers (2013–present) =

Canadian junior ice hockey team

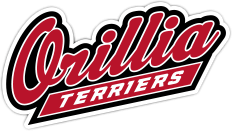
- City: Orillia, Ontario
- League: Provincial Junior Hockey League
- Conference: North
- Division: Carruthers
- Founded: 2013
- Home arena: West Orillia Sports Complex
- Colours: Black, red, and white
- General manager: Dallyn Telford (20??)
- Head coach: Dallyn Telford (2018–19)

The Orillia Terriers are a Canadian junior ice hockey team based in Orillia, Ontario. They played in the Georgian Mid-Ontario Junior C Hockey League until 2016 when the league merged into the Provincial Junior Hockey League.

== History ==
The Orillia Terriers are the first junior hockey club in Orillia since the Orillia Terriers of the Ontario Provincial Junior A Hockey League moved to Rama, Ontario in 1997.

On September 13, 2013, the Terriers travelled to Penetanguishene, Ontario to play their first-ever league game. The Penetang Kings won the game 4-0, when Gordie Weiss played his first game in net. The next night, the Terriers hosted the Huntsville Otters in their first home game. At 12:38 of the first period, Josh Allan scored the first goal in team history. Marty Lawlor scored a hat-trick (including the game winner), and Weiss played the entire game in net to clinch the franchise's first ever victory.

The Terriers finished their first season in seventh place out of ten teams with a record of 17 wins, 19 losses, and four regulation ties.

On February 1, 2014, the Terriers played their first playoff game, losing 3-2 in overtime to the Midland Flyers. Weiss played the entire game, and Daniel Lee scored the first playoff marker in team history.

== Season-by-season standings ==
| Season | GP | W | L | T | OTL | GF | GA | P | Results | Playoffs |
| 2013-14 | 40 | 17 | 19 | - | 4 | 135 | 160 | 38 | 7th GMOHL | Lost preliminary, 0-2 (Flyers) |
| 2014-15 | 40 | 17 | 20 | - | 3 | 149 | 173 | 37 | 7th GMOHL | Won quarterfinals, 4-2 (Siskins); Lost semifinals, 1-4 (Hornets) |
| 2015-16 | 40 | 12 | 26 | 2 | - | 109 | 159 | 26 | 9th of 9 GMOHL | Did not qualify |
| 2016-17 | 42 | 15 | 27 | 0 | - | 136 | 227 | 30 | 6th of 8-PJHL; Carruthers Div | Lost div. quarterfinals, 3-4 (Kings) |
| 2017-18 | 42 | 4 | 38 | 0 | - | 97 | 332 | 8 | 8th of 8-PJHL; Carruthers Div | Lost div. quarterfinals, 0-4 (Siskins) |
| 2018-19 | 42 | 19 | 19 | 1 | 3 | 137 | 141 | 42 | 5th of 8-PJHL; Carruthers Div | Lost div. quarterfinals, 2-4 (Kings) |
| 2019-20 | 42 | 25 | 14 | 0 | 3 | 200 | 145 | 53 | 3rd of 8-PJHL; Carruthers Div | Won div. quarterfinals, 4-3 (Cougars); Lost div. semifinals, 2-4 (Siskins) |
| 2020-21 | Season lost due to COVID-19 pandemic | | | | | | | | | |
| 2021-22 | 30 | 21 | 8 | 1 | 0 | 134 | 97 | 43 | 3rd of 8-PJHL; Carruthers Div | Won div. quarterfinals, 4-0 (Flyers); Lost div. semifinals, 3-4 (Cougars) |
| 2022-23 | 40 | 19 | 18 | 1 | 2 | 139 | 151 | 41 | 5th of 9-PJHL; Carruthers Div | Won div. quarterfinals, 4-1 (Spartans); Lost div. semifinals, 0-4 (Siskins) |
| 2023-24 | 42 | 29 | 10 | 1 | 2 | 183 | 93 | 61 | 3rd of 9-PJHL; Carruthers Div | Won div. quarterfinals, 4-0 (Otters); Lost div. semifinals 0-4 (Siskins) |
| 2024-25 | 42 | 35 | 6 | 1 | 0 | 232 | 118 | 71 | 2nd of 8 Carruthers Div; 3rd of 16 North Conf; 5th of 63 - PJHL | Won div. quarterfinals, 4-0 (Flyers); Won div. semifinals 4-1 (Siskins); Won div. final 4-1 (Hornets); Lost North Conference final 1-4 (Barons) |
| 2025-26 | 42 | 28 | 12 | 1 | 1 | 162 | 119 | 58 | 3rd of 8 Carruthers Div; 5th of 15 North Conf; 16th of 61 - PJHL | Won div. quarterfinals, 4-0 (Bears); Lost div. semifinals 0-4 (Hornets) |
