= Alliston Hornets =

Canadian junior ice hockey team

- City: Alliston, Ontario
- League: Provincial Junior Hockey League
- Conference: North
- Division: Carruthers
- Founded: 1971
- Home arena: New Tecumseth Recreation Complex
- Colours: Green, yellow, black, and white
- General manager: Travis Chapman
- Head coach: Dan Schaly (2025-26)

Championships
- League champions: 1976, 1977, 1978, 1979, 1982, 1984, 2008, 2009, 2010, 2011, 2012, 2013, 2015, 2016, 2017, 2019, 2024
- Clarence Schmalz Cups: 2008, 2010

The Alliston Hornets are a Canadian junior ice hockey team based in Alliston, Ontario. Starting with the 2016-17 hockey season, the Hornets were members of the Provincial Junior Hockey League. Prior to the change, they played in the Georgian Mid-Ontario Junior C Hockey League.

== History ==
The Alliston Hornets were founded in 1971 as a member of the South-Central Junior D Hockey League. In 1973, that league was promoted and renamed the Central Ontario Junior C Hockey League, and then the Mid-Ontario Junior C Hockey League in 1976.

Despite training multiple National Hockey League alumni, the Hornets were in tough in the Mid-Ontario Junior C Hockey League with teams like the Bradford Bulls and the Orangeville Crushers. The Hornets won the Mid-Ontario Junior C Hockey League crown six times, but never got past the Clarence Schmalz Cup semi-final in the All-Ontario championships.

In 1994, the Mid-Ontario Junior C Hockey League merged with the Georgian Bay Junior C Hockey League to create the Georgian Mid-Ontario Junior C Hockey League. From 1994 until 2007, the Hornets have failed to win a league title. Other than a blip in the radar in 2001–02 that resulted in a 2nd place league finish but no playoff glory, since 1994 the Hornets were not up to par with their competition. In 2004, something changed. Since 2004, the Hornets have been putting up excellent winning seasons with a first-place finish and two third-place finishes.

The 2005–06 season saw the Hornets finish in third place. In the league quarter-final they drew the sixth seeded Stayner Siskins. In what many thought would be a cakewalk, the Siskins had another shocking conclusion in mind. The Hornets went up on the Siskins 3-0 with little problem. Game 4 saw the Siskins avoid the sweep with a win. The Siskins had gained enough momentum to take game 5 as well. Eventually, in the end, the Siskins won four straight games to make the ultimate comeback and take the series 4-3 over the Alliston Hornets.

The 2006–07 season saw the Hornets leading the standing for the first half of the season and then fall away to both the Fergus Devils and Penetang Kings. Finishing with the third seed, the Hornets battled the Schomberg Cougars and made quick work of them with a 4-0 sweep of the series. In the semi-final, the Hornets drew the Goliath Clarence Schmalz Cup (CSC) defending Champion Penetang Kings. The second seeded Kings won the series 4-2 in a drawn out seesaw battle. The Kings went on to win their second straight league and provincial title.

== Glory years (2007–present) ==
Since the beginning of the 2007–08 season, the Alliston Hornets finished the Penetang Kings successful run of two straight GMOHL titles and two Clarence Schmalz Cups with six consecutive GMOHL titles and two Schmalz Cups of their own. In six regular seasons (2007–08 to the end of 2012–13), the Hornets have amassed a record of 213 wins, 23 losses, three ties, and seven losses in overtime to win five GMOHL regular season banners. In each of these six years, the Hornets have managed to win the GMOHL playoff championship and advance into the Ontario Hockey Association playdowns.

=== Success versus Walkerton ===
The OHA has pinned up the winner of the GMOHL against the Champion of the Western Ontario Junior C Hockey League every year in the provincial quarter-final since the GMOHL was formed in 1994. From the 1995 playoffs until 2004, the Western League champion never failed in defeating the GMOHL champion. In their twelfth year of competition, the Penetang Kings snapped that steak against the Kincardine Bulldogs and did it again in 2007 against the same team. In the Western League, a new power was rising - the Walkerton Hawks, for years a basement dweller, had surged in recent years and took over the reins from the Bulldogs and like the Hornets won the Western League for six consecutive years. The Hawks and Hornets would meet in the quarter-final of the OHA in each of those six years and it would prove to be a disaster for the Hawks. Despite fielding competitive teams, the Hornets would win every series against the Hawks, with a combined record of 24 wins and nine losses.

=== Success versus the Empire B League ===
The OHA chooses semi-final opponents based on closest proximity to each other. From 2008 until 2013, the Empire B Junior C Hockey League's champion has defeated the Central Ontario Junior C Hockey League's champion and has been inline to face the Hornets. From 2008 until 2012 the Hornets did not lose a series to the Empire B League champion. In 2008, the Hornets defeated the Napanee Raiders in five games, in 2009 the Amherstview Jets in five games, in 2010 the Raiders in six games, in 2011 the Picton Pirates in four games, and in 2012 the Hornets came back from a 3-0 deficit to defeat the Campbellford Rebels in seven games. In five years, the Hornets recorded a record of 20 wins and seven losses against the champions of the Empire B League.

In 2013, the tides changed, as the Picton Pirates returned to the Schmalz Cup semi-final. The Pirates would sweep the Hornets in four straight games to end Alliston's reign of dominance over the Empire B League.

== Season-by-season standings ==
Season	GP	W	L	T	OTL	GF	GA	P	Results	Playoffs
1971-72	29	16	10	3	-	132	111	35	2nd SCJDHL	Lost final
1972-73	29	12	12	6	-	136	117	31	4th SCJDHL	Lost semi-final
1973-74	30	13	14	3	-	141	147	29	4th Central G1	Lost semi-final
1974-75	32	16	16	0	-	145	146	32	4th Central G1	Lost semi-final
1975-76	32	22	9	1	-	183	124	45	2nd Central G1	Won League, lost CSC QF
1976-77	30	20	9	1	-	199	149	41	2nd Central G1	Won League, lost CSC SF
1977-78	32	20	5	7	-	209	110	47	1st MOJCHL	Won League, lost CSC SF
1978-79	31	27	1	3	-	--	--	57	1st MOJCHL	Won League, lost CSC QF
1979-80	40	26	13	1	-	214	169	53	2nd MOJCHL	Lost semi-final
1980-81	36	27	9	0	-	208	134	54	1st MOJCHL	Lost semi-final
1981-82	40	34	5	1	-	292	163	69	1st MOJCHL	Won League, lost CSC QF
1982-83	36	22	14	0	-	231	193	44	2nd MOJCHL	Lost semi-final
1983-84	34	20	12	2	-	209	158	42	3rd MOJCHL	Won League, lost CSC QF
1984-85	36	21	13	2	-	250	188	44	3rd MOJCHL	Lost semi-final
1985-86	34	7	27	0	-	139	277	14	9th MOJCHL	Lost quarter-final
1986-87	34	17	16	1	-	183	156	35	5th MOJCHL	Lost semi-final
1987-88	34	10	23	1	-	150	194	21	6th MOJCHL	Lost quarter-final
1988-89	36	12	23	1	-	135	224	25	5th MOJCHL	Lost quarter-final
1989-90	34	10	24	0	-	146	211	20	6th MOJCHL	Lost semi-final
1990-91	34	13	21	0	-	--	--	26	5th MOJCHL	Lost quarter-final
1991-92	34	17	13	4	-	184	171	38	3rd MOJCHL	Lost quarter-final
1992-93	39	14	22	2	1	183	210	31	6th MOJCHL	
1993-94	40	15	24	1	-	217	239	31	6th MOJCHL	
1994-95	36	16	17	3	-	--	--	35	7th GMOHL	Won quarter-final 4-2 (Cougars); Lost semi-final 3-4 (Shamrocks)
1995-96	44	24	20	0	-	215	207	48	4th GMOHL	Won quarter-final 3-2 (Bulls); Lost semi-final 1-3 (Kings)
1996-97	36	13	22	1	-	164	192	27	8th GMOHL	Won quarter-final 3-0 (Shamrocks); Lost semi-final 1-4 (Cubs)
1997-98	36	12	23	1	-	145	191	25	9th GMOHL	DNQ
1998-99	36	16	20	0	-	177	196	32	6th GMOHL	Lost quarter-final 0-4 (Siskins)
1999-00	36	10	24	2	-	136	198	22	7th GMOHL	Lost quarter-final 0-4 (Siskins)
2000-01	36	7	27	2	0	98	227	16	7th GMOHL	Lost quarter-final 0-4 (Devils)
2001-02	36	23	12	0	1	134	129	47	2nd GMOHL	Lost quarter-final 3-4 (Kings)
2002-03	36	10	24	1	1	117	178	22	7th GMOHL	Lost quarter-final 1-4 (Shamrocks)
2003-04	36	9	25	1	1	115	181	20	7th GMOHL	Lost quarter-final 0-4 (Siskins)
2004-05	40	26	9	5	0	170	114	57	1st GMOHL	Won quarter-final 4-0 (Flyers); Lost semi-final 0-4 (Shamrocks)
2005-06	42	26	12	4	0	215	141	56	3rd GMOHL	Lost quarter-final 0-4 (Devils)
2006-07	42	27	13	1	1	198	131	56	3rd GMOHL	Won quarter-final 4-0 (Cougars); Lost semi-final 2-4 (Kings)
2007-08	42	36	3	3	0	255	98	75	1st GMOHL	Won semi-final 4-0 (Shamrocks); Won League 4-1 (Kings); Won CSC quarter-final 4-2 (Hawks); Won CSC semi-final 4-1 (Raiders); Won CSC final 4-3 (73's)
2008-09	42	40	2	-	0	310	71	80	1st GMOHL	Won semi-final 4-0 (Siskins); Won League 4-2 (Kings); Won CSC quarter-final 4-0 (Hawks); Won CSC semi-final 4-2 (Jets); Lost CSC final 0-4 (73's)
2009-10	42	38	2	-	2	239	98	78	1st GMOHL	Won semi-final 4-2 (Shamrocks); Won League 4-3 (Kings); Won CSC quarter-final 4-1 (Hawks); Won CSC semi-final 4-1 (Raiders); Won CSC 4-2 (Canadiens)
2010-11	40	32	5	-	3	234	102	67	1st GMOHL	Won quarter-final 4-0 (Golden Hawks); Won semi-final 4-2 (Kings); Won League 4-3 (Siskins); Won CSC quarter-final 4-1 (Hawks); Won CSC semi-final 4-0 (Picton Pirates); Lost CSC final 1-4 (Peach Kings)
2011-12	40	32	8	-	0	236	113	64	2nd GMOHL	Won quarter-final 4-0 (Golden Hawks); Won semi-final 4-2 (Kings); Won League 4-0 (Siskins); Won CSC quarter-final 4-1 (Hawks); Won CSC semi-final 4-3 (Rebels); Lost CSC final 1-4 (Peach Kings)
2012-13	40	35	3	-	2	256	89	72	1st GMOHL	Won quarter-final 4-0 (Otters); Won semi-final 4-1 (Kings); Won League 4-1 (Flyers); Won CSC quarter-final 4-2 (Walkerton); Lost CSC semi-final 0-4 (Picton)
2013-14	40	30	9	-	1	156	93	61	2nd GMOHL	Won quarter-final 4-0 (Devils); Won semi-final 4-0 (Siskins); Lost final 2-4 (Kings)
2014-15	40	32	6	-	2	203	100	66	1st GMOHL	Won quarter-final 4-0 (Devils); Won semi-final 4-1 (Terriers); Won League 4-0 (Cougars); Won CSC quarter-final 4-3 (Walkerton); Lost CSC semi-final 0-4 (Panthers)
2015-16	40	35	2	3	-	206	60	73	1st of 9 GMOHL	Won quarter-final 4-0 (Cougars); Won semi-final 4-2 (Shamrocks); Won League 4-0 (Kings); Won CSC quarter-final 4-1 (Bulldogs); Lost CSC semi-final 2-4 (Panthers)
2016-17	42	36	5	1	-	248	109	73	2nd of 8 Carruthers Div-PJHL	Won div. quarter-final 4-1 (Cougars); Won div. semi-final 4-1 (Kings); Won div. final 4-0 (Siskins); Won conf. final 4-1 (Patriots); Lost Schmalz Cup semi-final 1-4 (Panthers)
2017-18	42	31	10	1	-	257	137	63	2nd of 8 Carruthers Div-PJHL	Won div. quarter-final 4-0 (Cougars); Won div. semi-final 4-2 (Golden Hawks); Lost div. final 1-4 (Siskins)
2018-19	42	29	9	2	2	191	133	62	2nd of 8 Carruthers Div-PJHL	Won div. quarter-final 4-0 (Otters); Won div. semi-final 4-1 (Golden Hawks); Won div. final 4-0 (Kings); Won North Conf. final 4-2 (Patriots); Lost league semi-final 0-4 (Raiders)
2019-20	42	34	4	1	3	198	114	72	1st of 8 Carruthers Div-PJHL	Won div. quarter-final 4-0 (Otters); Won div. semi-final 4-3 (Kings); 1-0 (Siskins); Due to COVID, playoffs cancelled
2020-21	Season lost due to COVID-19 pandemic									
2021-22	30	20	8	1	1	155	85	42	4th of 8 Carruthers Div-PJHL	Won div. quarter-final 4-0 (Kings); Lost, div. semi-final 3-4 (Siskins)
2022-23	40	30	7	2	1	203	118	63	2nd of 9 Carruthers Div-PJHL	Won div. quarter-final 4-0 (Flyers); Lost semi-final 0-4 (Cougars)
2023-24	42	36	6	0	0	233	83	72	1st of 9 Carruthers Div-PJHL	Won div. quarter-final 4-0 (Spartans); Won div. semi-final 4-1 (Cougars); Won League 4-0 (Siskins); Lost conf. final 1-4 (Barons)
2025-26	42	32	10	0	0	218	102	64	2nd of 8 Carruthers Div; 4th of 15 North Conf; 7th of 61-PJHL	Won div. quarter-final 4-0 (Otters); Won div. semi-final 4-0 (Terriers); Lost div. final 2-4 (Siskins)

- 2000-2004
- 2004–present

== Clarence Schmalz Cup appearances ==
2008: Alliston Hornets defeated Essex 73's 4-3.
2009: Essex 73's defeated Alliston Hornets 4-0.
2010: Alliston Hornets defeated Belle River Canadiens 4-2.
2011: Grimsby Peach Kings defeated Alliston Hornets 4-1.
2012: Grimsby Peach Kings defeated Alliston Hornets 4-1.

== Notable alumni ==
- Perry Anderson
- Manny Legace
- John Madden
- Darrin Shannon
- Darryl Shannon
