= Caledon Golden Hawks =

Canadian junior ice hockey team

- City: Caledon, Ontario
- League: Provincial Junior Hockey League
- Conference: Northern
- Division: Carruthers
- Founded: 2010
- Home arena: Mayfield Arena
- Colours: Maroon, Yellow and White
- General manager: Robin Inscoe
- Head coach: Jim Vitale
- Affiliates: Caledon Admirals (OJHL); Caledon Bombers (GOJHL)

The Caledon Golden Hawks are a Canadian junior ice hockey team based in Caledon, Ontario, Canada. They are a member of the Provincial Junior Hockey League. Formerly they played in the Georgian Mid-Ontario Junior C Hockey League.

== History ==
The Caledon Golden Hawks were founded in 2010 as members of the Georgian Mid-Ontario Junior C Hockey League. The Golden Hawks are the first junior team in Caledon since the Caledon Canadians of the Metro Junior A Hockey League and Ontario Provincial Junior A Hockey League left due to a disagreement with the city in 1999. In their first season in the GBMOJHL, the Golden Hawks leading scorer was Domenic Calabrigo with 48 points, along with 114 PIMs in 40 games.

The PJHL did a minor realignment of several teams in the hopes of creating a more balanced league. Part of this exercise saw the Golden Hawks moved to the Orr Division in the East Conference.

== Season-by-season standings ==
Season	GP	W	L	T	OTL	GF	GA	P	Results	Playoffs
2010-11	40	4	33	-	3	105	287	11	8th GMOHL	Lost Quarters - 0-4 - (Hornets)
2011-12	40	14	25	-	1	161	233	29	7th GMOHL	Lost Quarters - 0-4 - (Hornets)
2012-13	40	19	19	-	2	119	161	40	6th GMOHL	Lost Quarters - 1-4 - (Flyers)
2013-14	40	21	14	-	5	151	142	47	5th GMOHL	Lost Quarters 1-4, (Cougars)
2014-15	40	18	18	-	4	142	158	40	5th GMOHL	Lost Quarters 0-4, (Kings)
2015-16	40	17	20	3	-	140	143	37	5th of 9 GMOHL	Won Quarters, 4-2 (Siskins); Lost Semifinals, 3-4 (Kings)
2016-17	42	11	29	2	-	136	172	24	8th of 8-PJHL; Carruthers Div	Lost Div. Quarters, 1-4 (Siskins)
2017-18	42	23	17	2	-	192	153	48	3rd of 8-PJHL; Carruthers Div	Won Div. Quarters, 4-3 (Otters); Lost Div Semifinals, 2-4 (Hornets)
2018-19	42	24	15	2	1	173	141	51	3rd of 8-PJHL; Carruthers Div	Won Div. Quarters, 4-2 (Flyers); Lost Div Semifinals, 1-4 (Hornets)
2019-20	42	17	22	1	2	147	164	37	5th of 8-PJHL; Carruthers Div	Lost Div. Quarters, 0-4 (Kings)
2020-21	Season Lost due too COVID-19 pandemic									
2021-22	30	9	19	0	2	78	141	20	6th of 8-PJHL; Carruthers Div	Lost Div. Quarters, 2-4 (Cougars)
2022-23	40	9	28	2	1	108	192	21	8th of 9-PJHL; Carruthers Div	Lost Play in Game (Kings)
2023-24	42	13	25	1	3	98	139	30	7th of 9-PJHL; Carruthers Div	Lost Div. Quarters, 0-4 (Siskins)
2024-25	42	2	38	2	0	101	316	6	7th of 7 Orr Division; 15th of 15 East Conf; 63rd of 63-PJHL	Lost Div. Quarters, 0-4 (Eagles)
2025-26	42	3	38	1	0	69	321	7	7th of 7 Orr Division; 14th of 14 East Conf; 60th of 61-PJHL	Lost Div. Quarters, 0-4 (Bruins)
