= Innisfil Spartans =

- City: Innisfil, Ontario, Canada
- League: Provincial Junior Hockey League
- Division: Carruthers
- Home arena: Innisfil Regional Complex
- Colours: Red, Black, and Gold
- General manager: Ed Garinger (2026)
- Head coach: Graham Pickard (2026)

Franchise history
- 2007-2010: Innisfil Lakers (GMHL)
- 2022–present: Innisfil Spartans

The Innisfil Spartans are a Junior ice hockey team based in Innisfil, Ontario, Canada. They played in the Provincial Junior Hockey League.

== History ==
The Lakers are one of six expansion teams for the 2007-08 GMHL season.

On September 6, 2007, the Innisfil Lakers played their first ever game in franchise history against the Douro Dukes in Ennismore, Ontario. The game resulted in a 2–0 loss for the Lakers. The next night, the Lakers played the South Muskoka Shield in Gravenhurst, Ontario and picked up their first win 6–4.

On November 30, 2007, the Lakers played their long-awaited first home game. The sixteenth game of the season, the delay was over the late finish of construction on Innisfil's new arena which is the Home of the Lakers. Their opponent was the Richmond Hill Rams, which the Lakers defeated by a score of 4–2.

On December 29, 2007, the Lakers hosted the Moscow Selects All-star team in an exhibition game. The Selects won the game by a score of 7–3. This was the first game of seven that the Moscow team played against different GMJHL clubs.

Despite getting a first round bye, the Lakers found themselves in a battle in the 2008 playoffs. In the first round, they met the 2007 semi-finalist Richmond Hill Rams. The series went the distance with the Lakers taking game seven to win the series. In the league semi-final, the Lakers met the 2nd seed Temiscaming Royals. In a tough fought series, the Lakers came out winning 4-games-to-2. In the final, the Lakers found themselves pitted against the defending 2007 Russell Cup champion Bradford Rattlers. The Lakers challenged the Rattlers in each game, but Bradford was not to be denied. The Rattlers won with a four-game-sweep.

On January 4, 2009, the Lakers played Kazakhstan's Torpedo UST-Kamenogorsk Under-18 team. Innisfil, the third team in the GMHL to play Torpedo, defeated them 5–3.

On Friday Feb. 20 The Lakers defeated Bradford to clinch the franchise's 1st regular season division title and the top seed in the South division. In the South Division quarter-final, the Lakers would knock off the Ontario Lightning Rams 3-games-to-1. They elected to take a bye through to the division final. The Lakers met the Deseronto Storm in South final, only to lose 4-games-to-2.

Innisfil took a leave of absence for the 2010–11 season to restructure the organization, but ceased operations permanently during that season.

=== Spartans ===
In August 2021 the Innisfil Sports Group announced the return of junior hockey in the form of the Innisfil Spartans. The Spartans will play in the Provincial Junior Hockey League, affiliated with the Ontario Hockey Association. The team will compete in the Carruthers Division of the North Conference. Their first season was a solid 4th-place finish out of the 9 division teams.

== Season-by-season standings ==
Season	GP	W	L	T	OTL	GF	GA	P	Results	
2008-09	43	36	6	-	1	286	130	73	2nd GMJHL	Won Div quarter-final 3-1 (Rams); Div semi-final BYE; Lost Div final 2-4 (Storm)
2009-10	42	26	14	-	2	213	191	54	5th GMJHL	Lost quarter-final 0-3 (Storm)
3 Seasons	127	91	30	-	6	727	450	--	0.740	
Innisfil Spartans
Season	GP	W	L	T	OTL	GF	GA	P	Results	Playoffs
2022-23	40	20	17	2	1	151	161	43	4th of 9-PJHL; Carruthers Div	Lost Div Quarter, 1-4 (Terriers)
2023-24	40	7	31	2	2	97	195	18	8th of 9-PJHL; Carruthers Div	Lost Div Quarter, 0-4 (Hornets)
2024-25	42	16	25	0	1	127	156	33	6th of 8 Carruthers Div; 11th of 16 North Conf; 43rd of 63 PJHL	Lost Div Quarters 1-4 (Siskins)
2025-26	42	10	31	0	1	85	183	21	8th of 8 Carruthers Div; 15th of 15 North Conf; 56rd of 61 PJHL	Lost Div Quarters 0-4 (Siskins)

=== Playoffs ===
- 2008 Lost final

Innisfil Lakers defeated Richmond Hill Rams 4-games-to-3 in quarter-final
Innisfil Lakers defeated Temiscaming Royals 4-games-to-2 in semi-final
Bradford Rattlers defeated Innisfil Lakers 4-games-to-none in final

- 2009 Lost division final

Innisfil Lakers defeated Ontario Lightning Rams 3-games-to-1 in division quarter-final
Received bye through division semi-final.
Deseronto Storm defeated Innisfil Lakers 4-games-to-2 in division final

- 2010 Lost quarter-final

Deseronto Storm defeated Innisfil Lakers 3-games-to-none in quarter-final
