= Midland Flyers =

Canadian junior ice hockey team

- City: Midland, Ontario
- League: Provincial Junior Hockey League
- Conference: North
- Division: Carruthers
- Founded: 1978
- Home arena: North Simcoe Sports & Recreation Centre
- Colours: Black, orange, and white
- President: Stuart Connolly 2025–present
- General manager: Johnny Hewson (2025)
- Head coach: Andrew Priest (2025)

Franchise history
- 1978–1994: Midland Centennials
- 1994–1999: Midland Flyers
- 1999–2002: Midland Thunder
- 2002–Present: Midland Flyers

The Midland Flyers are a Canadian junior ice hockey team based in Midland, Ontario. They play in the Provincial Junior Hockey League and are former members of the Georgian Mid-Ontario Junior C Hockey League.

== History ==
In 1985, the Centennials won the Georgian Bay championship and went through to the Clarence Schmalz Cup final, where they ran into the Great Lakes Junior C Hockey League's Belle River Canadiens. The Canadiens took the All-Ontario final 4-games-to-1.

In 1994, the Georgian Bay Junior C Hockey League merged with the Mid-Ontario Junior C Hockey League to create the Georgian Mid-Ontario Junior C Hockey League. That same year, the Midland Centennials decided to change their name to the Midland Flyers.

In 1999, the team chose to change its name to the Midland Thunder. The team was very competitive. Despite not winning any league championships, the Thunder maintained a winning record and kept near the top of the league.

In 2002, the Midland Thunder again became the Midland Flyers. 2002 was also when the franchise's winning ways seemed to disappear. In the five seasons since Midland became the Flyers, the team has not won ten games in one season.

The 2005–06 season saw the team bottom out with a completely winless season. The eighth seeded Flyers drew the wrath of the first seed Penetang Kings, who swept the Flyers in their first of six rounds of playoffs to win the Clarence Schmalz Cup as All-Ontario Champions.

The 2006–07 season was a mild improvement. For the second year in a row, the Flyers drew the Penetang Kings in the first round of the playoffs, where Kings beat the Flyers 4-games-to-none to win the league quarter-final. The Kings went on to win the league and another Clarence Schmalz Cup.

== 2012–13 season ==
In the 2013 GMOJHL playoffs, the Flyers defeated the Caledon Golden Hawks in five games and the Stayner Siskins in five games, to reach their first league final since 1986. Midland faced the five-time consecutive champion Alliston Hornets in the final.

The Flyers lost their team president, general manager and head coach when Dave Gillespie died following the 2024–25 season. He was only 56.

== Season-by-season standings ==
Season	GP	W	L	T	OTL	GF	GA	P	Results	Playoffs
1973-74	40	15	19	6	-	171	189	36	4th MOJBHL	Lost final
1974-75	40	21	11	8	-	193	161	50	3rd MOJBHL	Lost semi-final
1975-76	36	16	14	6	-	149	162	38	4th MOJBHL	
1976-77	40	10	24	6	-	158	231	26	6th MOJBHL	DNQ
1977-78	Did not participate									
1978-79	36	6	25	5	-	168	248	17	7th GBJCHL	DNQ
1979-80	30	0	29	1	-	--	--	1	7th GBJCHL	DNQ
1980-81	34	14	18	2	-	191	211	30	5th GBJCHL	Lost semi-final
1981-82	40	13	24	3	-	--	--	29	7th GBJCHL	DNQ
1982-83	34	17	15	2	-	--	--	36	6th GBJCHL	Lost quarter-final
1983-84	32	14	10	8	-	--	--	36	3rd GBJCHL	Lost semi-final
1984-85	32	19	11	2	-	215	164	40	3rd GBJCHL	Won league, lost CSC Final
1985-86	32	25	5	2	0	265	144	52	1st GBJCHL	Won league, lost CSC QF
1986-87	32	19	9	3	1	186	168	42	2nd GBJCHL	Lost semi-final
1987-88	30	10	18	0	2	142	194	22	5th GBJCHL	Lost quarter-final 0-3 (Blair McCann)
1988-89	36	25	9	0	2	221	137	52	2nd GBJCHL	Won quarter-final 4-0 (Bruins); Lost semi-final 0-4 (Siskins)
1989-90	36	24	10	1	1	181	121	50	3rd GBJCHL	Won quarter-final 4-0 (Huskies); Lost semi-final 2-4 (77's)
1990-91	30	4	24	1	1	100	188	10	6th GBJCHL	Lost quarter-final 1-4 (77's)
1991-92	36	14	18	2	2	--	--	32	5th GBJCHL	Lost quarter-final 1-4 (77's)
1992-93	35	13	17	2	3	--	--	31	4th GBJCHL	Lost quarter-final 1-3 (Kings)
1993-94	38	17	19	0	2	--	--	36	4th GBJCHL	Lost semi-final 0-4 (Siskins)
1994-95	36	21	15	0	-	--	--	42	5th GMOHL	Won preliminary round 2-0 (Cubs); Lost quarter-final 2-4 (Kings)
1995-96	43	15	26	2	-	164	209	32	8th GMOHL	DNQ
1996-97	36	19	16	1	-	172	195	39	5th GMOHL	Lost quarter-final 0-3 (Cubs)
1997-98	36	18	15	3	-	185	177	39	4th GMOHL	Lost quarter-final 0-3 (Kings)
1998-99	36	26	10	0	-	216	151	52	1st GMOHL	Won quarter-final 4-0 (Cubs); Won semi-final 4-0 (Bulls); Lost final 2-4 (Devils)
1999-00	36	20	14	2	-	201	160	42	4th GMOHL	Lost quarter-final 1-4 (Cubs)
2000-01	36	20	12	3	1	174	119	43	3rd GMOHL	Won quarter-final 4-0 (Cougars); Lost semi-final 3-4 (Devils)
2001-02	36	19	12	4	1	149	125	43	4th GMOHL	Lost quarter-final 2-4 (Shamrocks)
2002-03	36	7	27	1	1	146	230	16	8th GMOHL	Lost quarter-final 1-4 (Siskins)
2003-04	36	4	27	3	2	107	245	13	8th GMOHL	Lost quarter-final 0-4 (Shamrocks)
2004-05	40	6	31	1	2	102	212	15	8th GMOHL	Lost quarter-final 0-4 (Hornets)
2005-06	42	0	37	1	4	93	269	5	8th GMOHL	Lost quarter-final 0-4 (Kings)
2006-07	41	3	35	1	2	91	237	9	7th GMOHL	Lost quarter-final 0-4 (Kings)
2007-08	42	15	21	3	3	121	179	36	5th GMOHL	Lost quarter-final 1-4 (Shamrocks)
2008-09	42	6	31	-	5	96	215	17	7th GMOHL	Lost quarter-final 0-4 (Kings)
2009-10	42	10	27	-	5	102	201	25	6th GMOHL	Lost quarter-final 0-4 (Siskins)
2010-11	40	15	22	-	3	132	187	33	5th GMOHL	Lost quarter-final 2-4 (Kings)
2011-12	40	16	22	-	2	144	167	34	6th GMOHL	Won quarter-final 4-0 (Shamrocks); Lost semi-final 0-4 (Siskins)
2012-13	40	25	14	-	1	203	146	51	3rd GMOHL	Won quarter-final 4-1 (Hawks); Won semi-final 4-1 (Siskins); Lost final 1-4 (Hornets)
2013-14	39	5	29	-	5	111	233	15	10th GMOHL	Won preliminary round 2-0 (Terriers); Lost quarter-final 0-4 (Kings)
2014-15	40	11	24	-	5	131	194	27	10th GMOHL	DNQ
2015-16	40	19	16	5	-	152	148	43	3rd of 9 GMOHL	Lost quarter-final 1-4 (Kings)
2016-17	42	17	25	0	-	154	205	34	4th of 8-PJHL; Carruthers Div	Won quarter-final 4-2 (Otters) Lost semi-final, 0-4 (Siskins)
2017-18	42	17	23	2	-	173	227	36	5th of 8-PJHL; Carruthers Div	Lost quarter-final 2-4 (Kings)
2018-19	42	17	20	2	3	141	184	39	7th of 8-PJHL; Carruthers Div	Lost quarter-final 2-4 (Golden Hawks)
2019-20	42	14	25	0	3	129	180	31	7th of 8-PJHL; Carruthers Div	Lost quarter-final 1-4 (Stayner Siskins)
2020-21	Season lost due to COVID-19 pandemic									
2021-22	30	8	21	0	1	74	195	17	7th of 8-PJHL; Carruthers Div	Lost quarter-final 0-4 (Terriers)
2022-23	40	8	27	4	1	122	195	21	9th of 9-PJHL; Carruthers Div	Lost quarter-final 1-4 (Hornets)
2023-24	42	3	37	2	0	68	264	8	9th of 9-PJHL; Carruthers Div	DNQ
2024-25	42	9	31	2	0	92	227	20	7th of 8 Carruthers; 14th of 16 North Conf; 54th of 63-PJHL	Lost quarter-final 0-4 (Terriers)
2025-26	42	17	22	2	1	92	153	37	5th of 8 Carruthers; 11th of 15 North Conf; 39th of 61-PJHL	Won quarter-final 4-3 (Terriers); Lost 0-4 div. semi-final (Stayner Siskins)

- 1973–1977
- 2000–2004
- 2004–present

== 2013 offseason ==
Midland Flyers announced that head coach Ed Garinger had resigned his current position with the Midland Flyers and had joined the Alliston Hornets as head coach. Midland Flyers hired Luke Dubbin as head coach along with Kyle Horzempa as assistant coach. Gerry Asselin returned as general manager and team president.

== 2014 offseason ==
Midland Flyers announced that head coach Luke Dubbin was stepping down and that they had hired Dave Steele as their new head coach. Steele was an assistant coach with the Waterloo Siskins of the Greater Ontario Junior (B) Hockey League the previous season. Waterloo had won their Midwestern Conference Championship (their first in 20 years). Gerry Asselin remained as general manager and president.

== Clarence Schmalz Cup appearances ==
- 1985: Belle River Canadiens defeated Midland Centennials 4-games-to-1.

== Notable alumni ==
- Sandy McCarthy
