= Penetang Kings =

Canadian junior ice hockey team

- City: Penetanguishene, Ontario
- League: Provincial Junior Hockey League
- Conference: North
- Division: Carruthers
- Founded: 1977
- Home arena: Penetanguishene Memorial Community Centre
- Colours: Purple, Black, and White
- General manager: Scott Simon
- Head coach: Scott Simon

Franchise history
- 1973–1975: Penetang Hurons
- 1977–present: Penetang Kings

The Penetang Kings are a junior ice hockey team based in Penetanguishene, Ontario, Canada. They play in the Provincial Junior Hockey League (PJHL) in the Carruthers division in the Ontario Hockey Association.

== History ==
The first chapter of current Penetanguishene junior hockey history came in 1973. The Penetang Hurons joined up with the Central Ontario Junior C Hockey League, a league recently promoted from the Junior D level. The Hurons lasted only two seasons before folding.

In 1977, two years after the demise of the Hurons. The Penetang Kings were created as members of the Georgian Bay Junior C Hockey League.

In 1983-84, the Penetang won the Georgian Bay league championship to move into the All-Ontario playdowns. They made it all the way to the Clarence Schmalz Cup finals, where they played against the Niagara Junior C Hockey League champions, the Woodstock Navy-Vets. The Kings brushed them off with a 4-game-sweep to clinch their first ever provincial championship. The Kings were led to the Cup by local player and future National Hockey Leaguer Brian McReynolds, who the next year won the Manitoba Centennial Cup National Junior A Championship with the Orillia Travelways of the OHA Junior A Hockey League.

In 1994, the Georgian Bay league merged with the Mid-Ontario Junior C Hockey League to create the Georgian Mid-Ontario Junior C Hockey League. Although the Kings were rather competitive in the league, success has not come until recently.

The 2005-06 season saw the Kings finish the regular season in first place. In the league quarter-finals, the Kings were placed against the eighth place Midland Flyers and swept them 4-games-to-none. The semi-final was against the sixth seeded Stayner Siskins. The Kings dispatched them 4-games-to-1 to move on to the Georgian Mid-Ontario finals. The Kings were up against the powerhouse Fergus Devils, but it in surprising fashion swept the second seeded Devils 4-games-to-none to win their first ever Georgian Mid-Ontario championship. The Kings found themselves in the All-Ontario playdowns for the first time possibly twenty-two years. Their quarter-final match up was against the Kincardine Bulldogs of the Western Junior C Hockey League. In their hardest challenge yet, they bested the Bulldogs 4-games-to-2. In the semi-finals, the Kings ran into the Central Junior C Hockey League's Port Perry Mojacks. The Kings dispatched the Mojacks 4-games-to-2 to reach their first Clarence Schmalz Cup final in twenty-two years. The Kings were up against a heavily favoured Essex 73's squad. The 73's had torn up the Great Lakes Junior C Hockey League and swept the Niagara Junior C Hockey League's Simcoe Storm to reach the final. Penetang's goalie, Dan Earles, took over and post three 1-0 shutouts in a 4-games-to-1 series victory over the 73's.

The 2006-07 season was more of a challenge than ever. After coming in second place in the regular season to the Fergus Devils, the Kings again had to face the Midland Flyers in the quarter-finals and again swept them 4-games-to-none. In the semi-final, the Kings were challenged by a tough Alliston Hornets squad. After going up 3-games-to-none in the series, the Hornets battled back to make the series 3-games-to-2 before the Kings finally won a tight game 6 and kill the Hornet surge thanks to 2 late game points. This set up a rematch of the 2006-07 GMO Final. Fergus came out tough, but were beaten in the first two games both in double overtime, both times by a 3-2 score. The Devils came back and won game 3 and game 4 just to have the Kings win game 5 and then game 6 4-3 in overtime. Four of the six games played in the Final were finished in overtime. In the semi-final, the Kings again ran into the Kincardine Bulldogs of the Western Junior C Hockey League. By game 4, the Bulldogs had the Kings against the wall with a 3-games-to-1 series lead. To the Bulldogs dismay, the Kings won game 5 2-1, game 6 3-1, and then game 7 with a crushing 5-0 victory. In the semi-final, the Kings drew the Central Junior C Hockey League's Lakefield Chiefs and in an extremely close series, swept the Chiefs 4-games-to-none to reach the All-Ontario Final for the second straight year. Again, their opponent was the Great Lakes Junior C Hockey League's Essex 73's. In the Final, the 73's got the one-up on the Kings in game 1, taking it 4-3. From that point on, with again excellent backstopping from Dan Earles, the Kings dismantled the 73's. They won the next 4 games straight to win the series 4-games-to-1 and clinch their second straight Clarence Schmalz Cup.

== Season-by-season standings ==
Season	GP	W	L	T	OTL	GF	GA	P	Results	Playoffs
1973-74	30	9	17	4	-	138	176	22	6th CJCHL	Lost MO Semi-final
1974-75	31	4	25	2	-	84	191	10	7th CJCHL	Lost MO Semi-final
1975-77	Did Not Participate									
1977-78	32	21	8	3	-	262	170	45	1st GBJCHL	Won League, lost CSC QF
1978-79	35	31	3	1	-	255	144	63	1st GBJCHL	Won League, lost CSC SF
1979-80	30	23	7	0	-	--	--	46	1st GBJCHL	Won League, lost CSC QF
1980-81	32	19	9	4	-	211	149	42	4th GBJCHL	Lost quarter-final
1981-82	40	26	11	3	-	--	--	55	2nd GBJCHL	Won League, Bronze in OHA
1982-83	34	20	10	4	-	--	--	44	4th GBJCHL	Won League, lost CSC SF
1983-84	32	24	6	2	-	--	--	50	1st GBJCHL	Won quarter-final 4-1 (Siskins); Won semi-final 4-0 (Centennials); Won League4-1 (Shamrocks); Won CSC quarter-final 4-1 (Hornets)); Won CSC semi-final 4-3 (Eagles); Won CSC final 4-0 (Navy Vets)
1984-85	32	19	8	5	-	185	136	43	1st GBJCHL	Won quarter-final 4-0 (80's); Lost semi-final 3-4 (77's)
1985-86	32	16	16	0	0	204	175	32	5th GBJCHL	Lost quarter-final 2-4 (Bruins)
1986-87	32	11	18	2	1	166	221	25	6th GBJCHL	Lost quarter-final 0-4 (Blair McCann)
1987-88	30	12	18	0	0	143	159	24	4th GBJCHL	Lost quarter-final 0-3 (77's)
1988-89	36	2	32	2	0	131	259	6	7th GBJCHL	Lost quarter-final 0-4 (Blair McCann)
1989-90	36	9	26	1	0	121	219	19	5th GBJCHL	Lost quarter-final 1-4 (Siskins)
1990-91	30	15	12	2	1	146	124	33	4th GBJCHL	Won quarter-final 4-1 (Bruins); Won semi-final 4-1 (Siskins); Lost final 0-4 (Brewers)
1991-92	36	21	14	1	0	--	--	43	4th GBJCHL	Lost quarter-final 1-4 (Bruins)
1992-93	35	14	20	0	1	--	--	29	5th GBJCHL	Won quarter-final 3-1 (Centennials); Lost semi-final 1-4 (Siskins)
1993-94	38	17	19	0	2	--	--	36	3rd GBJCHL	Lost semi-final 1-4 (Bruins)
1994-95	36	27	8	1	-	--	--	55	1st GMOHL	Won quarter-final 4-2 (Flyers); Won semi-final 4-3 (Bulls); Lost final 0-4 (Devils)
1995-96	44	23	20	1	-	217	204	47	5th GMOHL	Won quarter-final 3-2 (Shamrocks); Won semi-final 3-1 (Hornets); Lost final 0-4 (Siskins)
1996-97	35	17	17	1	-	164	149	35	6th GMOHL	Lost quarter-final 0-3 (Cubs)
1997-98	36	17	18	1	-	158	177	35	5th GMOHL	Won quarter-final 3-0 (Thunder); Won semi-final 4-1 (Shamrocks); Lost final 0-4 (Bulls)
1998-99	36	16	18	2	-	178	173	34	5th GMOHL	Lost quarter-final 3-4 (Bulls)
1999-00	36	13	21	2	-	172	184	28	6th GMOHL	Lost quarter-final 2-4 (Bulls)
2000-01	36	20	14	1	1	155	138	41	4th GMOHL	Won quarter-final 4-1 (Bulls); Lost semi-final 3-4 (Siskins)
2001-02	36	14	19	1	2	144	160	31	7th GMOHL	Won quarter-final 4-3 (Hornets); Lost semi-final 0-4 (Siskins)
2002-03	36	17	17	1	1	157	146	36	5th GMOHL	Won quarter-final 4-3 (Bulls); Lost semi-final 2-4 (Siskins)
2003-04	36	19	11	5	1	159	127	44	4th GMOHL	Won quarter-final 4-1 (Devils); Lost semi-final 0-4 (Siskins)
2004-05	40	23	9	6	2	157	124	54	3rd GMOHL	Won quarter-final 4-2 (Siskins); Won semi-final 4-2 (Devils); Lost final 0-4 (Shamrocks)
2005-06	42	28	8	4	2	170	109	62	1st GMOHL	Won quarter-final 4-0 (Flyers); Won semi-final 4-1 (Siskins); Won League 4-0 (Devils); Won CSC quarter-final 4-2 (Bulldogs); Won CSC semi-final 4-2 (Mojacks); Won CSC final 4-1 (73's)
2006-07	42	27	9	3	3	190	127	60	2nd GMOHL	Won quarter-final 4-0 (Flyers); Won semi-final 4-2 (Hornets); Won League 4-2 (Devils); Won CSC quarter-final 4-3 (Bulldogs); Won CSC semi-final 4-0 (Chiefs); Won CSC final 4-1 (73's)
2007-08	42	35	6	0	1	222	91	71	2nd GMOHL	Won quarter-final 4-0 (Cougars); Won semi-final 4-2 (Devils); Lost final 1-4 (Hornets)
2008-09	42	30	10	-	2	194	121	62	2nd GMOHL	Won quarter-final 4-0 (Flyers); Won semi-final 4-2 (Shamrocks); Lost final 2-4 (Hornets)
2009-10	42	32	8	-	2	206	104	66	2nd GMOHL	Won quarter-final 4-0 (Cougars); Won semi-final 4-3 (Siskins); Lost final 3-4 (Hornets)
2010-11	40	21	12	-	7	168	146	49	5th GMOHL	Won quarter-final 4-2 (Flyers); Lost semi-final 0-4 (Hornets)
2011-12	40	21	18	-	1	168	152	43	4th GMOHL	Won quarters - 4-0 - (Cougars); Lost semi's - 2-4 - (Hornets)
2012-13	40	21	15	-	4	200	181	46	4th GMOHL	Won quarters - 4-1 - (Shamrocks); Lost semi's - 1-4 - (Hornets)
2013-14	40	30	6	-	4	217	133	64	1st GMOHL	Won quarters - 4-0 - (Flyers); Won semi's - 4-2 - (Cougars); Won League - 4-2 - (Hornets); Lost CSC QF - 2-4 - (Wingham)
2014-15	40	20	15	-	5	141	147	45	4th GMOHL	Won quarters - 4-0 - (Golden Hawks); Lost semi's - 0-4 - (Cougars)
2015-16	40	17	23	2	-	143	164	36	6th of 9 GMOHL	Won quarters - 4-1 - (Flyers); Won semifinals - 4-3 - (Golden Hawks); Lost finals, 0-4 (Hornets)
2016-17	42	17	21	2	-	159	213	36	6th of 8-PJHL; Carruthers Div	Won Div Quarters - 4-3 - (Terriers); Lost div semi-final, 1-4 (Hornets)
2017-18	42	21	18	3	-	185	166	45	4th of 8-PJHL; Carruthers Div	Won Div Quarters - 4-2 - (Flyers); Lost div semi-final, 2.4 (Siskins)
2018-19	42	20	19	1	2	168	170	43	4th of 8-PJHL; Carruthers Div	Won Div Quarters - 4-2 - (Terriers); Won Div Semifinal, 4-0 (Siskins); Lost Div. Finals 0-4 (Hornets)
2019-20	42	20	21	0	1	184	181	41	4th of 8-PJHL; Carruthers Div	Won Div Quarters - 4-0 (Golden Hawks); Lost div semi-final, 3-4 (Hornets)
2020-21	Season Lost due too COVID-19 pandemic									
2021-22	42	20	19	1	2	168	170	43	4th of 8-PJHL; Carruthers Div	LOST Div Quarters - 0-4 (Hornets)
2022-23	40	8	26	4	2	110	209	22	9th of 9-PJHL; Carruthers Div	Lost Div Quarters - 0-4 (Siskins)
2023-24	42	18	20	1	3	145	167	40	5th of 9-PJHL; Carruthers Div	Lost Div Quarters - 0-4 (Cougars)
2024-25	42	17	20	4	1	150	169	39	4th of 8 Carruthers Div; 9th of 18 North Conf; 41 of 63 PJHL	Won Div Quarters - 4-3 (Otters); Lost Div semi final, 0-4 (Hornets)
2025-26	42	24	13	4	1	148	111	53	4th of 8 Carruthers Div; 8th of 15 North Conf; 27 of 61 PJHL	Lost Div Quarters - 3-4 (Flyers)

(*) Standings Incomplete.

- 2000–04
- 2004–present

== Clarence Schmalz Cup appearances ==
1984: Penetang Kings defeated Woodstock Navy-Vets 4-games-to-none
2006: Penetang Kings defeated Essex 73's 4-games-to-1
2007: Penetang Kings defeated Essex 73's 4-games-to-1

== Notable alumni ==
- Brian McReynolds
- Andre Benoit
