= Schomberg Cougars =

Canadian junior ice hockey team

- City: Schomberg, Ontario
- League: Provincial Junior Hockey League
- Founded: 1969
- Home arena: Trisan Centre
- Colours: Black, red, and white
- General manager: Drew Laskoski
- Head coach: Stan Kondrotas
- Parent club: Aurora Tigers

The Schomberg Cougars are a junior ice hockey team based in Schomberg, Ontario, Canada. They played in the Georgian Mid-Ontario Junior C Hockey League until 2016 when the league merged into the Provincial Junior Hockey League.

== History ==
The Schomberg Cougars Hockey Club was founded in 1969 as a member of the Eastern Junior D League, but moved to the South-Central Junior D Hockey League in 1971. The founders were John Archibald, George Crane, Geoff Hogan, and Len Taylor. There had been a Junior team from the Metro Junior B Hockey League playing for a few years in the early 1960s. In 1971 Archibald visited eight adjoining municipalities to encourage them to enter junior teams and from that Alliston, Bradford, Keswick, and Orangeville came on board. Len Taylor coached the team for six years and carried out the duties of president at the same time. John Archibald was secretary-treasurer for 15 years as well as team manager for a few years. Geoff Hogan acted as vice-president before moving to Calgary in 1973. George Crane was a director for three years and managed the team in its inaugural year.

In 1973, the Cougars and their league were promoted, as the league became the Central Ontario Junior C Hockey League. Three seasons later, the league became the Mid-Ontario Junior C Hockey League.

In 1994, the Mid-Ontario Junior C Hockey League merged with the Georgian Bay Junior C Hockey League. The Cougars continued as members, but the league was dominated by teams like the Stayner Siskins and the Fergus Devils.

The year-to-year play of the Cougars could be considered as inconsistent, but in 2002-03 the Cougars finished the regular season in a three-way tie for second place. They went on to win their first and only Georgian Mid-Ontario Junior C championship that year, after defeating Erin in seven games in the semi-finals, as well as Stayner (first place team) in six games. That year the Cougars had the three top scorers in the league. The Cougars did not manage to reach the Clarence Schmalz Cup finals after losing in four straight games to the Hanover Barons of the Western Ontario Junior C Hockey League.

The 2005-06 season saw the Cougars finish in fifth place in the Georgian Mid-Ontario League. They entered the playoffs against the fourth seeded Erin Shamrocks. The Shamrocks made quick work of the Cougars, finishing the series four games to one.

The 2006-07 season had the Cougars finishing in sixth place. In the league quarter-finals, the Cougars faced the Alliston Hornets, losing four games to none.

Following the 2023-24 season the PJHL did some re-organization to better balance the divisions (7 of 8 have 8 teams and 7 teams in the other division) resulted in the Cougars moving from the Carruthers Division in the North Conference to now compete in the Orr Division of the East Conference.

== Season-by-season standings ==
Season	GP	W	L	T	OTL	GF	GA	P	Results	Playoffs
1971-72	30	16	11	3	-	161	129	35	3rd SCJDHL	Lost semi-final
1972-73	27	6	15	6	-	111	145	24	5th SCJDHL	Lost quarter-final
1973-74	30	10	15	5	-	132	155	25	5th Central G1	Lost "D" final
1974-75	31	2	27	2	-	112	211	6	8th Central G1	Lost "D" final
1975-76	32	9	20	3	-	126	220	21	7th Central G1	Lost "D" final
1976-77	26	8	16	2	-	136	201	18	8th Central G1	Lost "D" final
1977-78	32	20	10	2	-	188	167	42	2nd MOJCHL	
1978-79	33	14	15	4	-	--	--	32	4th MOJCHL	
1979-80	40	24	14	2	-	238	202	50	3rd MOJCHL	Lost final
1980-81	36	20	16	0	-	201	215	40	3rd MOJCHL	Lost semi-final
1981-82	40	11	28	1	-	204	264	23	4th MOJCHL	Lost semi-final
1982-83	36	13	23	0	-	200	234	26	6th MOJCHL	Lost quarter-final
1983-84	34	11	22	1	-	161	223	23	7th MOJCHL	DNQ
1984-85	35	4	31	0	-	108	346	8	7th MOJCHL	DNQ
1985-86	34	14	20	0	-	218	246	28	5th MOJCHL	
1986-87	34	17	14	3	-	185	157	37	4th MOJCHL	Lost quarter-final 0-4 (Hornets)
1987-88	36	19	17	0	-	194	194	38	4th MOJCHL	Lost quarter-final 2-4 (Blues)
1988-89	36	19	17	0	-	209	195	38	4th MOJCHL	2nd of 3 in quarter-final round robin Lost semi-final 0-4 (Crushers)
1989-90	34	17	17	0	-	169	177	34	3rd MOJCHL	Lost quarter-final 1-3 (Hornets)
1990-91	34	22	11	1	-	--	--	45	2nd MOJCHL	Lost semi-final 2-4 (Sabres)
1991-92	34	23	8	3	-	148	126	49	2nd MOJCHL	Won semi-final 4-1 (Bulls); Lost final 0-4 (Crushers)
1992-93	38	17	15	6	0	164	171	40	5th MOJCHL	
1993-94	40	23	17	0	-	260	222	46	3rd MOJCHL	Lost semi-final 0-3 (Bulls)
1994-95	36	19	17	0	-	--	--	38	6th GMOHL	Lost quarter-final 2-4 (Hornets)
1995-96	44	16	28	0	-	226	283	32	9th GMOHL	DNQ
1996-97	36	5	30	1	-	177	250	11	9th GMOHL	DNQ
1997-98	36	13	22	1	-	161	193	27	8th GMOHL	Lost quarter-final 0-3 (Bulls)
1998-99	36	9	27	0	-	137	189	18	8th GMOHL	DNQ
1999-00	36	8	28	0	-	120	126	16	9th GMOHL	DNQ
2000-01	36	14	18	3	1	135	161	31	6th GMOHL	Lost quarter-final 0-4 (Flyers)
2001-02	36	15	20	0	1	152	157	31	6th GMOHL	Lost quarter-final 3-4 (Devils)
2002-03	36	23	12	0	1	183	153	47	3rd GMOHL	Won quarter-final 4-1 (Devils); Won semi-final 4-3 (Shamrocks); Won league 4-2 (Siskins) lost CSC QF 0-4 (Hanover)
2003-04	36	22	12	2	0	188	136	46	3rd GMOHL	Lost quarter-final 3-4 (Bulls)
2004-05	40	10	21	6	3	132	169	29	7th GMOHL	Lost quarter-final 2-4 (Devils)
2005-06	42	21	19	2	0	187	186	44	5th GMOHL	Lost quarter-final 1-4 (Shamrocks)
2006-07	42	6	34	2	0	124	276	14	6th GMOHL	Lost quarter-final 0-4 (Hornets)
2007-08	42	5	36	1	0	111	254	11	7th GMOHL	Lost quarter-final 0-4 (Kings)
2008-09	42	15	25	-	2	164	230	32	5th GMOHL	Lost quarter-final 3-4 (Siskins)
2009-10	42	6	33	-	3	109	235	15	7th GMOHL	Lost quarter-final 0-4 (Kings)
2010-11	40	14	25	-	1	129	182	29	6th GMOHL	Lost quarter-final 0-4 (Siskins)
2011-12	40	17	21	-	2	134	157	36	5th GMOHL	Lost quarter-final 0-4 (Kings)
2012-13	40	14	20	-	6	139	181	34	7th GMOHL	Lost quarter-final 0-4 (Siskins)
2013-14	40	25	10	-	5	194	131	55	4th GMOHL	Won quarter-final 4-1 (Golden Hawks); Lost semi-final 2-4 (Kings)
2014-15	40	18	19	-	3	152	169	39	6th GMOHL	Won quarter-final 4-2 (Otters); Won semi's 4-0 (Kings); Lost final 0-4 (Hornets)
2015-16	40	13	24	3	-	133	156	29	8th of 9GMOHL	Lost quarter-final 0-4 (Hornets)
2016-17	42	14	27	1	-	151	190	29	7th of 8 Carruthers Div-PJHL	Lost quarter-final 1-4 (Hornets)
2017-18	42	15	24	1	2	154	207	33	7th of 8 Carruthers Div-PJHL	Lost quarter-final 0-4 (Hornets)
2018-19	42	12	23	3	4	139	183	31	8th of 8 Carruthers Div-PJHL	Lost quarter-final 1-4 (Siskins)
2019-20	42	17	22	1	2	171	180	37	6th of 8 Carruthers Div-PJHL	Lost quarter-final 3-4 (Terriers)
2020-21	Season Lost due to COVID-19 pandemic									
2021-22	30	21	8	1	0	168	103	43	3rd of 8 Carruthers Div-PJHL	Won quarter-final 4-2 (Golden Hawks); Won semi-final 4-3 (Terriers); Lost final 0-4 (Siskins)
2022-23	40	28	9	2	1	196	114	59	3rd of 9 Carruthers Div-PJHL	Won quarter-final 4-0 (Otters); Lost Div semi-final 3-4 (Hornets)
2023-24	42	27	12	2	1	161	117	57	4th of 9 Carruthers Div-PJHL	Won quarter-final 4-0 (Kings); Lost Div semi-final 1-4 (Hornets)
2024-25	42	23	15	3	1	157	127	50	3rd of 7 Orr Div; 8th of 15 East Conf; 27th of 63-PJHL	quarter-final bye Lost Div semi-final 0-4 (Ice)
2025-26	42	10	29	3	0	107	187	23	6th of 7 Orr Div; 12th of 14 East Conf; 55th of 61-PJHL	Lost quarter-final 0-4 (Ice)

- 2000–04
- 2004–present
