= Orangeville Crushers =

- City: Orangeville, Ontario, Canada
- League: Ontario Junior Hockey League; Midwestern Junior B Hockey League; Mid-Ontario Junior C Hockey League; Central Ontario Junior C Hockey League
- Operated: 1975-2011
- Home arena: Alder Street Recreation Facility
- Colours: Orange, Black, and White
- General manager: Robin Inscoe
- Head coach: Dale Hawerchuk
- Affiliates: Barrie Colts (OHL); Schomberg Cougars (GMOHL)

Franchise history
- 1975-1987: Orangeville Stone Crushers
- 1987-2000: Orangeville Crushers
- 2001-2005: Orangeville Thunder
- 2005-2010: Orangeville Crushers
- 2010-2011: Orangeville Flyers

The Orangeville Crushers were a Canadian Junior "A" ice hockey team from Orangeville, Ontario. They played in the Ontario Junior Hockey League, Midwestern Junior B Hockey League, and Mid-Ontario Junior C Hockey League.

== History ==
Founded in 1975, the Stonecrushers sat out the 1978-79 season. The owners of the team opted to attempt to field a team in the Georgian Bay Intermediate A Hockey League by the name of the Orangeville Cougars. The Cougars only won twice in all of 1978-79 and the Stonecrushers were brought back for 1979-80.

The team originated in the Central Ontario Junior C Hockey League, after one season in the league it became the Mid-Ontario Junior C Hockey League. In the late 1980s and early 1990s, the Crushers played in the Mid-Ontario Junior C Hockey League and won two straight league championships. They won the Clarence Schmalz Cup in 1990 as All-Ontario Champions. In the Clarence Schmalz Cup Finals, the Crushers came back from a 3-0 deficit in games to defeat the Belle River Canadiens of the Great Lakes Junior C Hockey League 4-3. The 1991 Clarence Schmalz Cup Final pitted the Crushers against a bound and determined Hanover Barons of the Western Junior C Hockey League. The Crushers again went down 3-0 in games and again forced a seventh and deciding contest but came out on the losing end, dropping the final game and the series 4-3.

=== Junior B ===
In 1994, the Crushers were accepted into the Midwestern Junior B Hockey League and stayed there until 2006. Orangeville had been accepted to play in the Ontario Provincial Junior A Hockey League for the start of the 2006-07 Season. A vote was concocted by the OPJHL teams, where the Crushers were voted in by a 33-3 vote. The Crushers would play out of the North Division. The team's head coach for the beginning of 2006-07 would be Steve Chelios, brother of National Hockey League great Chris Chelios . Chelios was let go in late October. The President of the team is another former NHLer, Dale Hawerchuk.

=== Junior A ===
The Crushers' first Junior "A" game took place on September 15, 2006 against Vaughan Vipers in Orangeville. The game resulted in a 6-3 loss. The Crushers' first ever Junior "A" goal was scored by Trevor Branning at 1:17 into the first period. Anthony Ferrante started the game in net.

The Crushers' first ever Junior "A" win was against the Stouffville Spirit on September 28, 2006 in Stouffville, Ontario. The final score was 3-2, with goaltender Michael Hutchinson picking up the win in net. Hutchinson stopped 35 of 37 shots, as the Crushers were badly outshot. Hutchinson also held the Spirit scoreless for the first 48:13 of the game, coming within less than 12 minutes of the shutout. The Crushers' Wil Munson of Corona, California scored the eventual game winner.

The Crushers finished the season one point out of the final playoff spot. With three games to go in the season, Orangeville either had to win or tie to clinch a spot or the Buffalo Jr. Sabres had to tie or lose—neither happened.

Team owner and National Hockey League Hockey Hall of Famer Dale Hawerchuk took over as head coach. In 2010, the changed its name to the Flyers.

On April 3, 2011, despite three consecutive .500 or more seasons, the franchise ceased operations. A week later, the owner of the Villanova Knights announced that he was moving the Knights to Orangeville and renaming them the "Orangeville Flyers".

== Season-by-season results ==
Season	GP	W	L	T	OTL	GF	GA	P	Results	Playoffs
1975-76	32	10	11	11	-	156	145	31	5th CJCHL	Lost "C" Semi-final
1976-77	30	15	15	0	-	176	187	30	5th CJCHL	Lost "C" Semi-final
1977-78	32	13	12	7	-	155	152	33	4th MOJCHL	Lost semi-final
1978-79	Did Not Participate									
1979-80	39	12	27	0	-	201	253	24	5th MOJCHL	DNQ
1980-81	36	15	21	0	-	182	188	30	4th MOJCHL	Lost final
1981-82	40	7	32	1	-	190	311	15	6th MOJCHL	DNQ
1982-83	36	20	15	1	-	201	162	41	3rd MOJCHL	Lost final
1983-84	34	26	6	2	-	232	132	54	1st MOJCHL	Lost semi-final
1984-85	36	20	16	0	-	254	174	40	5th MOJCHL	Lost final
1985-86	34	17	16	1	-	235	196	35	4th MOJCHL	
1986-87	34	21	13	0	-	246	161	42	3rd MOJCHL	Lost semi-final
1987-88	36	32	4	0	-	297	148	64	1st MOJCHL	Won League, lost CSC QF
1988-89	36	32	4	0	-	366	121	64	1st MOJCHL	Lost final
1989-90	35	30	5	0	-	294	138	60	1st MOJCHL	Won League, won CSC
1990-91	34	31	3	0	-	265	101	62	1st MOJCHL	Won League, lost CSC Final
1991-92	34	25	7	2	-	205	124	52	1st MOJCHL	Won League, lost CSC QF
1992-93	38	23	13	2	0	193	160	48	1st MOJCHL	Won League
1993-94	40	35	5	0	-	303	126	70	1st MOJCHL	Won League, lost CSC QF
1994-95	48	26	19	3	-	190	168	55	5th MWJBHL	Lost quarter-final
1995-96	48	29	17	2	-	219	171	60	4th MWJBHL	Lost quarter-final
1996-97	48	17	25	6	-	162	189	40	7th MWJBHL	Lost quarter-final
1997-98	48	29	18	1	-	202	152	59	5th MWJBHL	Lost semi-final
1998-99	48	24	21	3	-	214	203	51	5th MWJBHL	Lost semi-final
1999-00	48	17	29	2	-	169	215	36	7th MWJBHL	Lost quarter-final
2000-01	48	8	40	0	-	159	299	16	10th MWJBHL	DNQ
2001-02	48	8	38	2	-	131	280	18	9th MWJBHL	DNQ
2002-03	48	3	44	1	0	101	351	7	10th MWJBHL	DNQ
2003-04	48	2	44	0	2	84	282	6	10th MWJBHL	DNQ
2004-05	48	4	43	1	0	89	346	9	10th MWJBHL	DNQ
2005-06	48	5	42	1	-	104	303	11	10th MWJBHL	DNQ
2006-07	49	9	36	3	1	131	213	22	7th OPJHL-N	DNQ
2007-08	49	17	29	-	3	138	197	37	6th OPJHL-N	Lost Division QF
2008-09	49	33	15	-	1	212	159	67	4th OJHL-P	Lost Division F
2009-10	50	29	16	-	5	215	184	63	4th CCHL-W	Lost Preliminary
2010-11	50	24	24	-	2	173	176	50	5th OJHL-N	Lost Round of 16

== Clarence Schmalz Cup appearances ==
1990: Orangeville Crushers defeated Belle River Canadiens 4-games-to-3
1991: Hanover Barons defeated Orangeville Crushers 4-games-to-3

== Notable alumni ==
- Darryl Bootland
- Dan Ellis
- Michael Hutchinson
- Chris Neil
- Gary Sabourin
