= 2025–26 PJHL season =

- League: Provincial Junior Hockey League
- Sport: Hockey
- Teams: 61
- Finals champions: Fergus Whalers

PJHL seasons
- 2024–25 PJHL 2026–27 PJHL

The 2025–26 PJHL season is the 9th season of the Provincial Junior Hockey League. The league began play on September 10, 2025 and concluded on February 17, 2026. The post-season began on February 183, 2026 and will conclude in May 2026.

The winner of the playoffs will win the Clarence Schmalz Cup.

== Team Changes ==
- The Goderich Flyers take a year long leave of absence.
- The North Kawartha Knights take a year long leave of absence.

== Standings ==
Note: GP = Games played; W = Wins; L = Losses; OTL = Overtime losses; SL = Shootout losses; GF = Goals for; GA = Goals against; PTS = Points

=== East Orr Division ===
Rank	Team	GP	W	L	OTL	T	Pts	GF	GA
1	Uxbridge Bruins	42	35	6	0	1	71	206	72
2	Georgina Ice	42	31	9	2	0	64	201	105
3	Clarington Eagles	42	26	12	4	0	56	168	98
4	Port Perry Lumberjacks	42	26	15	1	0	53	203	141
5	Little Britain Merchants	42	16	24	2	0	34	119	149
6	Schomberg Cougars	42	10	29	3	0	23	107	187
7	Caledon Golden Hawks	42	3	38	1	0	7	69	321

=== East Tod Division ===
Rank	Team	GP	W	L	OTL	T	Pts	GF	GA
1	Lakefield Chiefs	42	30	10	1	1	62	208	127
2	Frankford Huskies	42	30	11	0	1	61	175	114
3	Napanee Raiders	42	27	12	2	1	57	147	99
4	Amherstview Jets	42	22	17	1	2	47	176	147
5	Picton Pirates	42	18	18	6	0	42	132	152
6	Port Hope Panthers	42	13	28	1	0	27	107	170
7	Trent Hills Thunder	42	7	31	3	1	18	99	235

=== North Carruthers Division ===
Rank	Team	GP	W	L	OTL	T	Pts	GF	GA
1	Stayner Siskins	42	32	9	1	0	65	204	122
2	Alliston Hornets	42	32	10	0	0	64	218	102
3	Orillia Terriers	42	28	12	1	1	58	162	119
4	Penetang Kings	42	24	13	4	1	53	148	111
5	Midland Flyers	42	17	22	2	1	37	130	153
6	Muskoka Bears	42	13	26	3	0	29	118	181
7	Huntsville Otters	42	12	28	2	0	26	104	198
8	Innisfil Spartans	42	10	31	0	1	21	85	183

=== North Pollock Division ===
Rank	Team	GP	W	L	OTL	T	Pts	GF	GA
1	Fergus Whalers	42	34	7	1	0	69	253	103
2	Hanover Barons	42	33	7	1	1	68	200	81
3	Mount Forest Patriots	42	25	13	4	0	54	152	135
4	Kincardine Bulldogs	42	18	21	2	1	39	144	195
5	Walkerton Capitals	42	13	26	2	1	29	111	200
6	Mitchell Hawks	42	12	25	3	2	29	128	194
7	Wingham Ironmen	42	12	28	2	0	26	105	185

=== South Bloomfield Division ===
Rank	Team	GP	W	L	OTL	T	Pts	GF	GA
1	Dundas Blues	42	34	7	1	0	69	242	138
2	Grimsby Peach Kings	42	31	9	2	0	64	198	115
3	Niagara Riverhawks	42	27	14	1	0	55	191	151
4	Glanbrook Rangers	42	21	16	4	1	47	216	190
5	Streetsville Derbys	42	21	20	1	0	43	217	219
6	Dunnville Jr. Mudcats	42	17	23	1	1	36	162	224
7	Port Dover Sailors	42	13	23	5	1	32	146	202
8	Hagersville Hawks	42	4	34	4	0	12	114	247

=== South Doherty Division ===
Rank	Team	GP	W	L	OTL	T	Pts	GF	GA
1	Woodstock Navy-Vets	42	29	8	4	1	63	171	102
2	Tavistock Braves	42	28	11	2	1	59	182	130
3	Wellesley Applejacks	42	27	14	1	0	55	160	138
4	New Hamburg Firebirds	42	24	13	4	1	53	154	135
5	Norwich Merchants	42	23	14	2	3	51	155	146
6	Hespeler Shamrocks	42	14	24	4	0	32	96	164
7	Paris Titans	42	13	26	3	0	29	148	198
8	Dorchester Dolphins	42	10	26	4	2	26	129	182

=== West Stobbs Division ===
Rank	Team	GP	W	L	OTL	T	Pts	GF	GA
1	Essex 73's	42	37	4	1	0	75	202	83
2	Lakeshore Canadiens	42	30	10	2	0	62	191	95
3	Blenheim Blades	42	30	10	2	0	62	160	111
4	Mooretown Flags	42	22	19	1	0	45	166	130
5	Amherstburg Admirals	42	15	21	6	0	36	131	151
6	Wheatley Sharks	42	17	24	1	0	35	121	148
7	Dresden Jr. Kings	42	15	22	4	1	35	171	192
8	Walpole Island Wild	42	2	39	1	0	5	64	296

=== West Yeck Division ===
Rank	Team	GP	W	L	OTL	T	Pts	GF	GA
1	Exeter Hawks	42	27	12	3	0	57	184	130
2	Thamesford Trojans	42	26	12	4	0	56	184	147
3	North Middlesex Stars	42	25	14	3	0	53	167	143
4	Petrolia Flyers	42	24	13	4	1	53	206	159
5	Mount Brydges Bulldogs	42	24	14	4	0	52	173	133
6	Port Stanley Sailors	42	20	18	3	1	44	167	168
7	Aylmer Spitfires	42	18	21	3	0	39	147	181
8	Lucan Irish	42	4	36	2	0	10	104	271

== Statistics ==
=== Scoring leaders ===
Note: GP = Games played; G = Goals; A = Assists; Pts = Points; PIM = Penalty minutes

Player	Team	GP	G	A	Pts	PIM
Cameron Graham	Dresden Jr. Kings	42	43	39	82	14
Joey Martin	Fergus Whalers	40	28	54	82	118
Joshua Cacciola	Glanbrook Rangers	37	23	59	82	54
Aidan Russell	Streetsville Derbys	41	35	44	79	69
Braedon Mitchell	Streetsville Derbys	38	27	52	79	45
Alex McGillivray	Hanover Barons	38	32	45	77	32
Spencer Gendall	Dundas Blues	41	29	47	76	65
Michael Colavecchia	Niagara Riverhawks	41	37	38	75	28
Owen Ireton	Woodstock Navy-Vets	42	36	39	75	14
Sebastien Ferris	Georgina Ice	37	34	41	75	30

=== Leading goaltenders ===
Note: GP = Games played; Mins = Minutes played; W = Wins; L = Losses: OTL = Overtime losses;
T = Ties; GA = Goals Allowed; SO = Shutouts; GAA = Goals Against Average

Player	Team	GP	MINS	W	L	OTL	T	GA	SO	Sv%	GAA
Robby DiMaria	Uxbridge Bruins	24	1338	19	4	0	0	31	6	0.943	1.39
Jairus Ford	Clarington Eagles	21	1074	13	4	0	0	32	2	0.931	1.79
Birk Cassels	Essex 73's	22	1316	20	1	1	0	41	3	0.916	1.87
Kevin Halloran	Uxbridge Bruins	20	1151	16	2	0	0	37	3	0.926	1.93
Derek Hartley	Hanover Barons	31	1812	23	6	1	0	60	5	0.928	1.99

== 2026 Schmalz Cup Playoffs ==
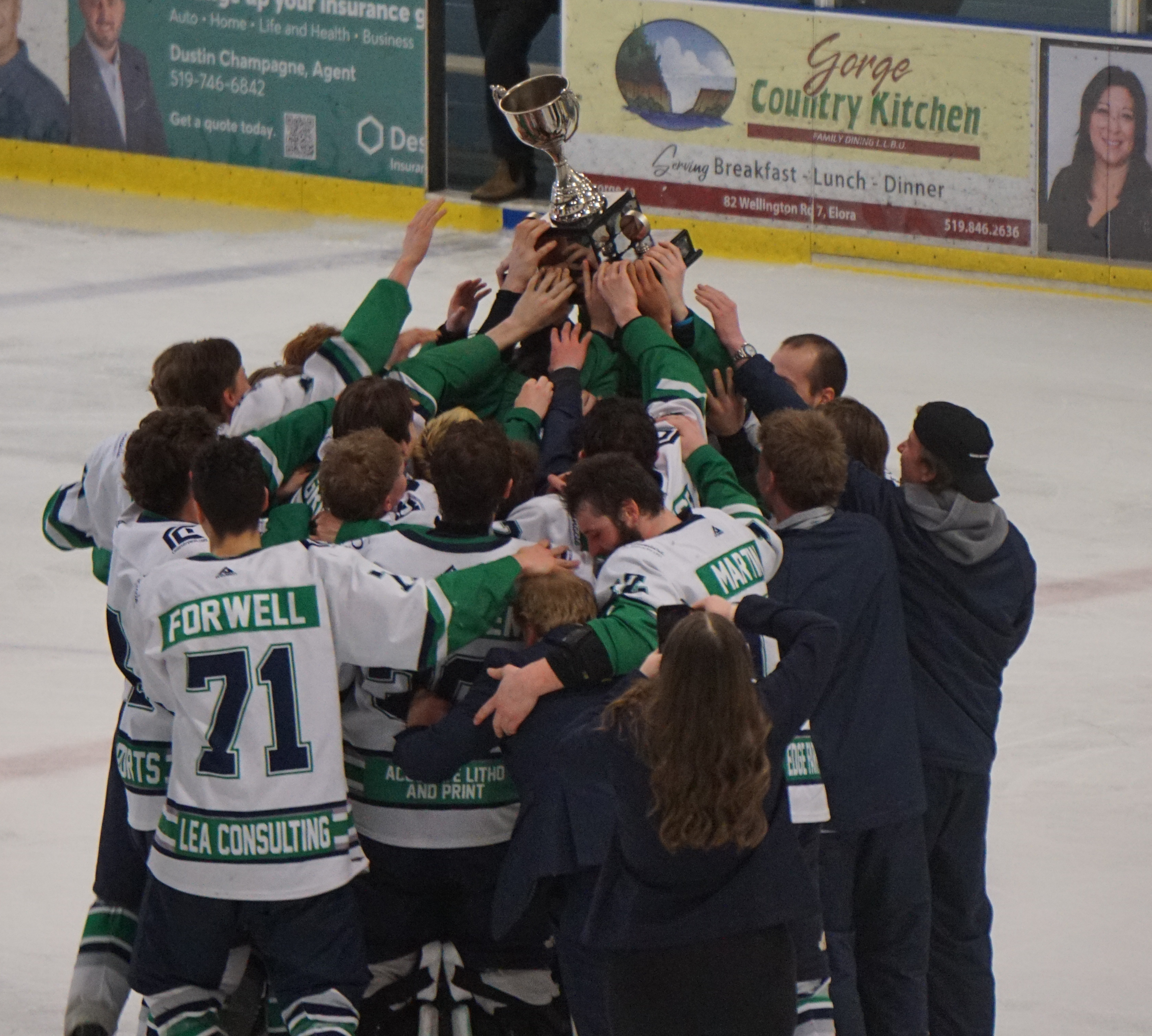
The Fergus Whalers winning the 2026 Schmalz Cup at the Centre Wellington Community Sportsplex in Fergus, Ontario.

Division Quarterfinal
O1	Uxbridge	4
O7	Caledon	0
O2	Georgina	4
O6	Schomberg	0
O3	Clarington	bye
O4	Port Perry	4
O5	Little Britain	0
T1	Lakefield	bye
T2	Frankford	4
T7	Trent Hills	0
T3	Napanee	4
T6	Port Hope	0
T4	Amherstview	3
T5	Picton	4
C1	Stayner	4
C8	Innisfil	0
C2	Alliston	4
C7	Huntsville	0
C3	Orillia	4
C6	Muskoka	0
C4	Penetang	3
C5	Midland	4
P1	Fergus	bye
P2	Hanover	4
P7	Wingham	0
P3	Mount Forest	4
P6	Mitchell	2
P4	Kincardine	4
P5	Walkerton	2
B1	Dundas	4
B8	Hagersville	0
B2	Grimsby	4
B7	Port Dover	3
B3	Niagara	4
B6	Dunnville	0
B4	Glanbrook	4
B5	Streetsville	2
D1	Woodstock	4
D8	Dorchester	0
D2	Tavistock	4
D7	Paris	0
D3	Wellesley	4
D6	Hespeler	0
D4	New Hamburg	1
D5	Norwich	4
S1	Essex	4
S8	Walpole Island	0
S2	Lakeshore	4
S7	Dresden	0
S3	Blenheim	4
S6	Wheatley	0
S4	Mooretown	2
S5	Amherstburg	4
Y1	Exeter	4
Y8	Lucan	0
Y2	Thamesford	4
Y7	Aylmer	0
Y3	North Middlesex	4
Y6	Port Stanley	2
Y4	Petrolia	1
Y5	Mount Brydges	4

Division Semifinal
O1	Uxbridge	4
O4	Port Perry	0
O2	Georgina	3
O3	Clarington	4
T1	Lakefield	4
T5	Picton	0
T2	Frankford	4
T3	Napanee	0
C1	Stayner	4
C5	Midland	0
C2	Alliston	4
C3	Orillia	0
P1	Fergus	4
P4	Kincardine	0
P2	Hanover	4
P3	Mount Forest	3
B1	Dundas	4
B4	Glanbrook	1
B2	Grimsby	1
B3	Niagara	4
D1	Woodstock	4
D5	Norwich	2
D2	Tavistock	4
D3	Wellesley	0
S1	Essex	4
S5	Amherstburg	1
S2	Lakeshore	4
S3	Blenheim	3
Y1	Exeter	2
Y5	Mount Brydges	4
Y2	Thamesford	1
Y3	North Middlesex	4

Division Final
O1	Uxbridge	4
O3	Clarington	2
T1	Lakefield	1
T2	Frankford	4
C1	Stayner	4
C2	Alliston	2
P1	Fergus	4
P2	Hanover	1
B1	Dundas	4
B3	Niagara	1
D1	Woodstock	3
D2	Tavistock	4
S1	Essex	3
S2	Lakeshore	4
Y5	Mount Brydges	4
Y3	North Middlesex	3

Conference Final
O1	Uxbridge	2
T2	Frankford	4
C1	Stayner	0
P1	Fergus	4
B1	Dundas	1
D2	Tavistock	4
S2	Lakeshore	4
Y5	Mount Brydges	0

League Semifinal
T2	Frankford	1
P1	Fergus	4
D2	Tavistock	4
S2	Lakeshore	2

Schmalz Cup Final
P1	Fergus	4
D2	Tavistock	1
