= Empire B Junior C Hockey League =

Empire B Junior "C" Hockey League
Head Office	Cambridge, Ontario
Official website	EBJCHL
Chairmen	Dick Woods
Convenor	Corrie Abrams
Operated	1989; 37 years ago - 2016; 10 years ago

The Empire B Junior C Hockey League is a former Junior "C" ice hockey league in Ontario, Canada, sanctioned by the Ontario Hockey Association. The league was merged into the Provincial Junior Hockey League as the Tod Division in the summer of 2016.

The league was known as the Eastern Ontario Junior "C" Hockey League from 1989–1996 and as the Empire B Junior "C" Hockey League from 1996–2016.

== History ==
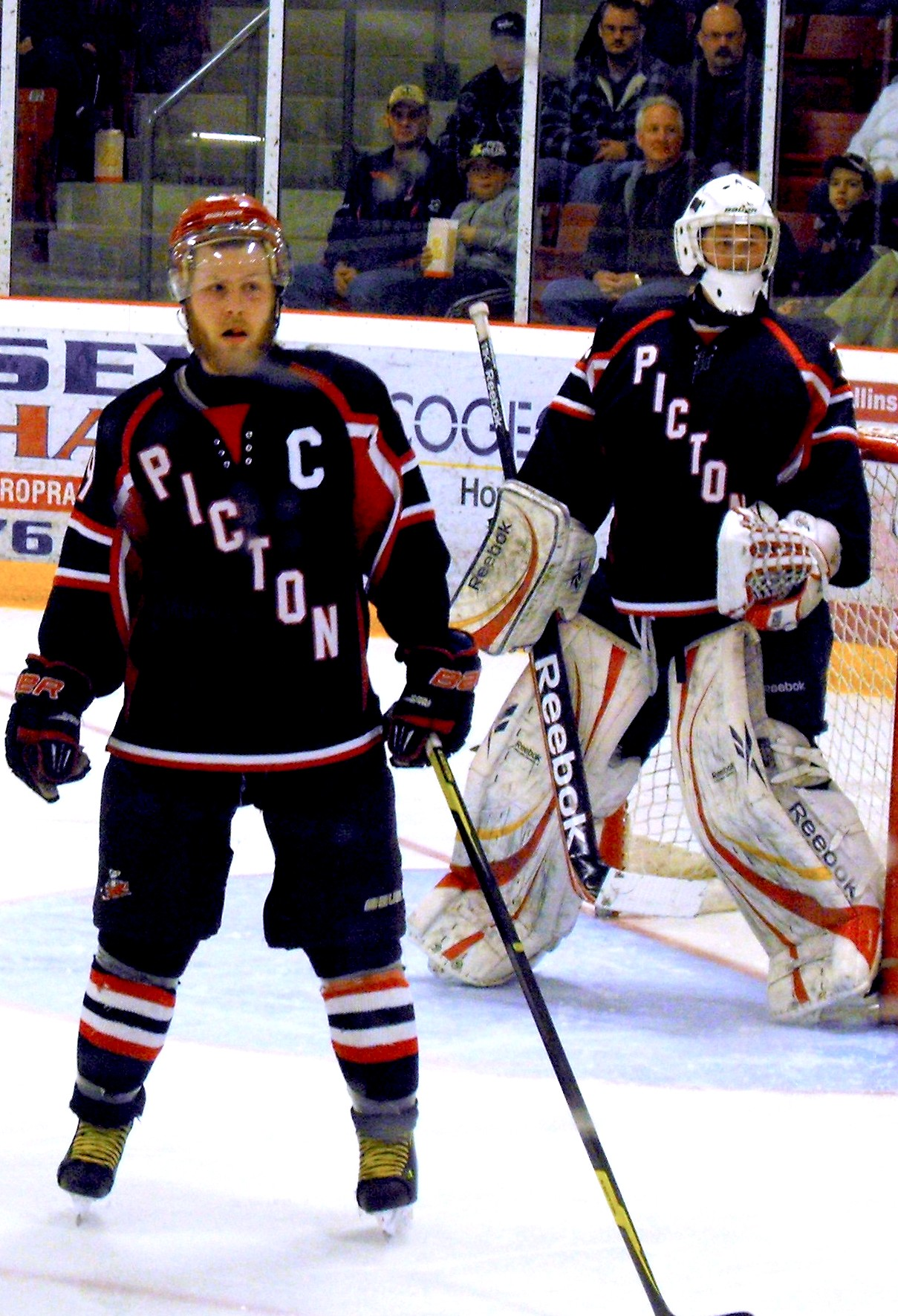
Pirates' Captain and goalie in 2013 Schmalz Cup finals in Essex, Ontario.

Formed in 1989 as the Eastern Ontario Junior C Hockey League, the league had to change its name in 1995 to avoid ongoing confusion with the neighbouring Ottawa District Hockey Association's long running Eastern Ontario Junior C Hockey League. The forerunner of the EBJCHL was the Quinte-St. Lawrence Junior C Hockey League, which merged into the Central Junior C Hockey League in 1986.

The league features six franchises, which are located through Central-eastern Ontario in Amherstview, Campbellford, Gananoque, Napanee, Port Hope, and Picton. The Port Hope Panthers is the new name of the transferred Colborne Cobras franchise.

The teams play a 40-game regular season, with four home and away dates against each of the other Empire B teams. The top four teams make the playoffs — two rounds of best-of-seven play. The Empire playoff champions advance to the OHA quarterfinals against the Central champions and compete for an All-Ontario Championship and the Clarence Schmalz Cup. In its 20-year history, two Empire B teams have won the Schmalz Cup. Napanee Raiders were the first in 1993. On May 1, 2013, the Picton Pirates became the second team in Empire league history to win the Clarence Schmalz Cup as OHA Junior C champions, defeating the Essex 73's of the Great Lakes Junior C Hockey League 4-games-to-1.

The Empire league has had a number of winners of the OHA Junior C Player of the Year award. Most recently, Napanee's Pete Sergeant took the honours in 2008-2009. Among the previous winners are Jason Sutton (Napanee), Adam Walsh (Picton), Joe Curry (Campbellford), and Ryan Zufelt (Amherstview).

At the conclusion of the 2014-15 hockey season the Eastern Ontario Junior B Hockey League announced a re-organization which saw them remove six teams from the league. One of those teams, the Gananoque Islanders immediately petitioned and was accepted into the Empire B Junior C League.

Following the 2015-16 seasons the Empire B Junior C Hockey League amalgamated with the other southern Ontario junior "C" hockey leagues and became a division within the Provincial Junior Hockey League.

== Teams ==
Team	Centre	Founded
Amherstview Jets	Amherstview	1989
Campbellford Rebels	Campbellford	1992
Gananoque Islanders	Gananoque	1972
Napanee Raiders	Napanee	1989
Picton Pirates	Picton	1989
Port Hope Panthers	Port Hope	2004

== 2015-2016 League Playoffs ==
For the Ontario Hockey Association "All-Ontario Jr. "C" Championship", please go to the Clarence Schmalz Cup.

Semi-final
1	Port Hope	4
4	Gananoque	0
2	Napanee	4
4	Amherstview	1

League Final
1	Port Hope	4
2	Napanee	0

== Tod Trophy Playoff Champions ==
Year	Champion	Finalist	Result in Provincials
Eastern Ontario League
1959	Picton Merchants		Lost CSC QF vs. Fort Erie
1960	Picton Merchants	Lindsay Muskies	Lost CSC SF vs. Whitby
1961	Gananoque Islanders		Lost CSC Final vs. Stratford (C)
1962	Napanee Red Wings	Picton Merchants	Lost CSC SF vs. Newmarket (Sub)
1963	Napanee Red Wings	Picton Merchants	Lost CSC Final vs. New Hamburg (C)
1964	Picton Merchants	Napanee Red Wings	Lost CSC QF vs. Lindsay (Sub)
1965	Gananoque Islanders	Picton Merchants	Lost CSC QF vs. Lindsay (Sub)
1966	Napanee Warriors		Lost CSC SF vs. Parry Sound (GB)
1967	Napanee Warriors		Lost CSC SF vs. Aurora (Sub)
1968	Napanee Warriors		Lost CSC QF vs. Huntsville (GB)
1969	Napanee Warriors	Gananoque Islanders	Lost CSC QF vs. Parry Sound (GB)
1970	Gananoque Islanders		Lost CSC QF vs. Huntsville (GB)
1971
1972	Gananoque G-Men		Lost CSC SF vs. Cobourg (CO)
Quinte-St. Lawrence League
1973	Gananoque G-Men		Lost SF to Lindsay (CO)
1974
1975
1976
1977
1978	Gananoque G-Men		Lost CSC QF vs. Bowmanville (CO)
1979	Gananoque G-Men		Lost CSC QF vs. Bowmanville (CO)
1980	Gananoque G-Men		Lost CSC SF vs. Bradford (MO)
1981	Ernestown Jets		Lost CSC QF vs. Bowmanvile (CO)
1982	Ernestown Jets		Lost CSC QF vs. Bowmanville (CO)
1983	Wellington Dukes		Lost CSC QF vs. Lindsay (CO)
1984	Frankford Huskies		Lost CSC QF vs. Bowmanville (CO)
1985	Gananoque G-Men		Lost CSC QF vs. Bowmanville (CO)
1986	Wellington Dukes		Lost CSC QF vs. Lakefield (CO)
Eastern Ontario League
1990	Napanee Raiders		Lost CSC SF vs. Orangeville (MO)
1991	Frontenac Flyers		Lost CSC QF vs. Uxbridge (CO)
1992	Ernestown Jets		Lost CSC QF vs. Port Perry (CO)
1993	Napanee Raiders		Won CSC vs. Hanover (WO)
1994	Napanee Raiders		Lost CSC QF vs. Bowmanville (CO)
1995	Napanee Raiders		Lost CSC QF vs. Bowmanville (CO)
1996	Napanee Raiders		Lost CSC Final vs. Paris (ND)
Empire B League
1997	Campbellford Rebels		Lost CSC QF vs. Lakefield (CO)
1998	Campbellford Rebels		Lost CSC QF vs. Little Britain (CO)
1999	Picton Pirates	Campbellford Rebels	Lost CSC QF vs. Lakefield (CO)
2000	Campbellford Rebels	Picton Pirates	Lost CSC QF vs. Lakefield (CO)
2001	Napanee Raiders	Campbellford Rebels	Lost CSC QF vs. Uxbridge (CO)
2002	Frontenac Flyers	Napanee Raiders	Lost CSC QF vs. Uxbridge (CO)
2003	Campbellford Rebels	Napanee Raiders	Lost CSC QF vs. Georgina (CO)
2004	Campbellford Rebels	Amherstview Jets	Lost CSC QF vs. Lakefield (CO)
2005	Amherstview Jets	Campbellford Rebels	Lost CSC QF vs. Uxbridge (CO)
2006	Napanee Raiders	Amherstview Jets	Lost CSC QF vs. Port Perry (CO)
2007	Amherstview Jets	Colborne Cobras	Lost CSC QF vs. Lakefield (CO)
2008	Napanee Raiders	Amherstview Jets	Lost CSC SF vs. Alliston (GMO)
2009	Amherstview Jets	Napanee Raiders	Lost CSC SF vs. Alliston (GMO)
2010	Napanee Raiders	Port Hope Panthers	Lost CSC SF vs. Alliston (GMO)
2011	Picton Pirates	Napanee Raiders	Lost CSC SF vs. Alliston (GMO)
2012	Campbellford Rebels	Picton Pirates	Lost CSC SF vs. Alliston (GMO)
2013	Picton Pirates	Port Hope Panthers	Won CSC vs. Essex (GL)
2014	Picton Pirates	Amherstview Jets	Lost CSC QF vs. Lakefield (CO)
2015	Port Hope Panthers	Napanee Raiders	Lost CSC Final vs. Essex (GL)
2016	Port Hope Panthers	Napanee Raiders	Lost CSC Final vs Ayr (MW)

== Regular season champions ==
Season	Champion	Record	Points
Eastern Ontario League
1958-59
1959-60
1960-61
1961-62	Gananoque Islanders*	15-7-0-0	30
1962-63	Napanee Red Wings*	12-7-0-0	24
1963-64	Napanee Red Wings	14-8-0-0	28
1964-65	Gananoque Islanders	13-6-2-0	28
1965-66
1966-67	Napanee Tiremen	12-7-3-0	27
1967-68
1968-69	Napanee Tiremen	14-0-2-0	30
1969-70
1970-71
1971-72
Quinte-St. Lawrence League
1972-73
1973-74
1974-75
1975-76
1976-77
1977-78	Wellington Dukes	21-10-1-0	43
1978-79
1979-80	Gananoque G-Men	22-10-0-0	44
1980-81	Campbellford GMC's	21-9-4-0	46
1981-82	Ernestown Jets	22-9-3-0	47
1982-83	Wellington Dukes	23-6-5-0	51
1983-84
1984-85	Gananoque G-Men	23-6-1-0	47
1985-86
Eastern Ontario League
1989-90	Napanee Raiders	25-4-1-0	51
1990-91	Napanee Raiders	22-7-1-0	45
1991-92	Napanee Raiders	27-0-3-0	57
1992-93	Napanee Raiders	32-2-1-0	67
1993-94	Napanee Raiders	24-9-3-0	51
1994-95	Napanee Raiders	29-7-4-0	62
1995-96	Napanee Raiders	28-12-2-0	58
Empire B League
1996-97	Napanee Raiders	31-9-2-0	64
1997-98	Picton Pirates	26-6-4-0	56
1998-99	Campbellford Rebels	30-4-2-0	62
1999-00	Picton Pirates	24-11-1-0	49
2000-01	Napanee Raiders	21-8-3-2	47
2001-02	Napanee Raiders	20-14-0-2	42
2002-03	Amherstview Jets	20-12-1-1	42
2003-04	Campbellford Rebels	23-10-1-0	47
2004-05	Napanee Raiders	23-8-1-2	49
2005-06	Napanee Raiders	24-6-4-0	52
2006-07	Colborne Cobras	32-6-1-0	65
2007-08	Amherstview Jets	34-5-0-1	69
2008-09	Napanee Raiders	37-3-0-0	74
2009-10	Napanee Raiders	29-7-0-4	62
2010-11	Napanee Raiders	22-16-0-2	46
2011-12	Picton Pirates	27-12-0-1	55
2012-13	Picton Pirates	34-4-0-2	70
2013-14	Picton Pirates	36-2-1-1	74
2014-15	Port Hope Panthers	31-8-1-0	63
2015-16	Port Hope Panthers	32-4-1-0	65

(*) At times in the 1960s, the Junior B and C leagues in Eastern Ontario played as a single league. In those years, listed is the best Junior C team in the joint standings.

== Former teams ==
- Brighton Buzz
- Frontenac Flyers
- Deseronto Storm
- Madoc Wildcats
- Trenton Golden Hawks

=== Quinte-St. Lawrence teams ===
- Bancroft Juniors
- Brighton Bruins
- Campbellford Merchants
- Clayton Thunderbirds
- Ernestown Dynamiters
- Frankford Huskies
- Gananoque G-Men
- Madoc Hurricanes
- Napanee Warriors
- Wellington Dukes

== Professional alumni ==
The league has had a few graduates make it to the NHL. In 2006, Carolina's Justin Williams became the league's first graduate to hoist the Stanley Cup. He played with the former Colborne/Brighton franchise. Former Amherstview Jets defencemen Jay McKee (Pittsburgh Penguins), Bryan Allen (Florida Panthers), and Kip Brennan (New York Islanders) have also skated in the pro league.

National Hockey League

- Bryan Allen (Ernestown 1995-96)
- Steve Bancroft (Madoc 1985-86)
- Jay McKee (Ernestown 1992-93)
- Justin Williams (Colborne 1997-98)

National Lacrosse League

- Nick Weiss (Port Hope 2012-13)
