= Port Hope Panthers =

Canadian junior ice hockey team

Port Hope Panthrs
- City: Port Hope, Ontario
- League: Provincial Junior Hockey League
- Conference: East
- Division: Tod
- Founded: 2004
- Home arena: Jack Burger Sports Complex
- Colours: White, Blue, Red
- General manager: Corey Beer (2025)
- Head coach: Corey Beer

Franchise history
- 2004–09: Colborne Cobras; 2009–present: Port Hope Panthers

The Port Hope Panthers are a junior hockey team based in Port Hope, Ontario, Canada. They play in the Provincial Junior Hockey League of the Ontario Hockey Association.

== History ==
In 1995, the Trenton Sting made the jump from the Eastern Ontario Junior C Hockey League to the Ontario Provincial Junior A Hockey League. In their wake, they formed a feeder team that was to be known as the Brighton Buzz. The Junior C league changed its name to the Empire B Junior C Hockey League just prior to the 1995-96 season to avoid confusion with the Ottawa District Hockey Association's Eastern Ontario Junior C Hockey League. After two seasons, in 1997 the Brighton Buzz moved and became the Colborne Blackhawks. The Blackhawks folded mid-season in 1999. The Sting's feeder team had been an utter disaster as it had only won 16 games in 140 contests over four seasons.

In 2004, Junior hockey came back to the Town of Colborne. The Empire B league expanded and formed the Colborne Cobras. Their first season was all about survival as the team finished in dead last.

The 2005-06 season saw the Cobras show some staying power with thirteen wins, despite a fifth-place finish. They made the playoffs, and in the league quarter-final the Cobras drew the Picton Pirates. The Cobras defeated the Pirates 3-games-to-2 to win the team's first ever playoff series. In the league semi-final, the Cobras were swamped by the eventual champion Napanee Raiders 4-games-to-none.

The 2006-07 season was a breakout season for the Colborne Cobras. With thirty-two wins in thirty-nine games, the Cobras finished in first place overall in the regular season. In the league semi-final, the Cobras drew the fourth seeded Campbellford Rebels. The Cobras dispatched the Rebels with a 4-games-to-none sweep. In the team's first ever league final, the Cobras found themselves up against the Amherstview Jets. After a long and hard-fought battle, the Jets had enough fuel left to win game 7 and the series 4-games-to-3.

On May 28, 2009, it was announced the Colborne Cobras would move to Port Hope to fill the void left by the OJHL's Port Hope Predators moving to Trenton and became the Port Hope Panthers.

The Panthers were the league champions for the 2014/15 season and came up short against the Essex 73's during the Clarence Schmalz finals. In 2015/16 they repeated as the league champion and repeated their run to the CSC finals only to have Ayr Centennials claim the title. This made the Panthers the final Empire B Junior C champions. On 2016/17 the league became members of the Provincial Junior Hockey League. In the first season of the PJHL the Panthers were the Tod Division Champions and made a playoff run the league finals. The finals was a rematch with Ayr Centennials who defended their CSC title.

== Season-by-season results ==
Season	GP	W	L	T	OTL	GF	GA	P	Results	Playoffs
Colborne Cobras
2004-05	34	3	27	2	2	74	167	10	6th of 6 EBJCHL	5th of 6 in Qualifier (2-8)
2005-06	34	13	21	0	0	120	156	26	5th of 6 EBJCHL	Won quarter-final, 3-2 (Pirates); Lost semi-final, 0-4 (Raiders)
2006-07	39	32	6	1	0	201	117	65	1st of 6 EBJCHL	Won semi-final, 4-2 (Raiders); Lost final, 3-4 (Jets)
2007-08	40	16	21	-	3	165	222	35	4th of 6 EBJCHL	Lost semi-final, 0-4 (Jets)
2008-09	40	9	26	-	5	128	224	23	6th of 6 EBJCHL	DNQ
Port Hope Panthers
2009-10	40	24	11	-	5	199	134	53	3rd of 6 EBJCHL	Won semi-final, 4-0 (Jets); Lost final, 1-4 (Raiders)
2010-11	40	17	18	-	5	137	161	39	5th of 5 EBJCHL	Won quarter-final, 3-2 (Rebels); Lost semi-final, 0-4 (Raiders)
2011-12	40	12	19	-	9	129	168	33	5th of 5 EBJCHL	Won quarter-final, 3-2 (Raiders); Lost semi-final, 0-4 (Pirates)
2012-13	40	25	14	-	1	184	154	51	2nd of 6 EBJCHL	Won semi-final, 4-1 (Rebels); Lost final, 1-4 (Pirates)
2013-14	40	20	15	-	5	145	130	45	3rd of 6 EBJCHL	Lost semi-final, 0-4 (Jets)
2014-15	40	31	8	1	-	210	93	63	1st of 6 EBJCHL	Won semi-final, 4-1 (Pirates); Won final, 4-0 (Raiders); Won CSC QF, 4-2 (Eagles); Won CSC SF, 4-0 (Hornets); Lost CSC Final, 3-4 (73's)
2015-16	40	34	5	1	-	223	72	69	1st of 6 EBJCHL	Won semi-final, 4-0 (Islanders); Won final, 4-0 (Raiders); Won CSC QF, 4-1 (Mojacks); Won CSC SF, 4-2 (Hornets); Lost CSC Final, 0-4 (Centennials)
2016-17	39	35	3	1	-	227	74	71	1st of 6 Tod Div. PJHL	Won Div. SF, 4-0 (Pirates); Won Div. Final, 4-0 (Raiders); Won Conf. Final, 4-2 (Chiefs); Won CSC Semi-final 4-1 (Hornets); Lost CSC Final, 2-4 (Centennials)
2017-18	37	27	9	1	-	240	89	55	2nd of 6 Tod Div. PJHL	Won Div. SF, 4-0 (Pirates); Won Div. Final, 4-1 (Jets); Lost Conf. Final, 3-4 (Chiefs)
2018-19	44	15	26	1	2	145	195	33	4th of 6 Tod Div. PJHL	Lost Div. SF, 0-4 (Raiders)
2019-20	44	21	16	3	4	170	152	49	5th of 6 Tod Div. PJHL	Did not qualify
2020-21	Season Lost due to COVID-19 pandemic									
2021-22	30	14	11	3	2	109	85	33	4th of 6 Tod Div. PJHL	Won Div. Quarters 4-1 (Rebels); Lost Div. SF, 0-4 (Jets)
2022-23	42	22	17	3	0	144	133	47	4th of 6 Tod Div. PJHL	Won Div. Quarters 4-1 (Huskies); Won Div. SF, 4-2 (Raiders); Won Div Final 4-1 (Pirates); Lost East Conf 0-4 (Eagles)
2023-24	42	23	14	4	1	176	140	51	3rd of 6 Tod Div. PJHL	Won Div. Quarters 4-0 (Rebels); Won Div Semifinals, 4-2 (Jets); Lost Div. Finals, 0-4 (Raiders)
2024-25	42	13	28	1	0	131	211	27	6th of 8 Tod Div; 12th of 15 East Conf; 47th of 63-PJHL	Lost Div. Quarters 0-4 (Jets)
2025-26	42	13	28	1	0	107	170	27	6th of 7 Tod Div; 11th of 14 East Conf; 51st of 61-PJHL	Lost Div. Quarters 0-4 (Raiders)

== Clarence Schmalz Cup appearances ==
2015: Essex 73's defeated Port Hope Panthers 4-games-to-3
2016: Ayr Centennials defeated Port Hope Panthers 4-games-to-none
2017: Ayr Centennials defeated Port Hope Panthers 4-games-to-2

== Notable alumni ==
- Justin Williams
- Nick Weiss
