= Napanee Raiders =

Canadian junior ice hockey team

- City: Napanee, Ontario
- League: Provincial Junior Hockey League
- Conference: East
- Division: Tod
- Founded: 1989
- Home arena: Strathcona Paper Centre
- Colours: Black, silver, and white
- General manager: Adam Bramburger
- Head coach: Ben Hagerman

Previous franchise history
- 1960–63: Napanee Red Wings
- 1964–65: Napanee Legion
- 1966–80: Napanee Kelly Tiremen
- 1980–86: Napanee Warriors
- 1989–now: Napanee Raiders

The Napanee Raiders are a junior ice hockey team based in Napanee, Ontario, Canada. They play in the Provincial Junior Hockey League of the Ontario Hockey Association.

== History ==
The current Napanee Junior C hockey team began in the 1960s as a member of the Eastern Junior C Hockey League, first known as the Napanee Red Wings and later the Napanee Legion. In 1966, the team changed its name to the Napanee Kelly Tiremen, a name they kept until the 1980 season. Napanee made several appearances in the Clarence Schmalz Cup playoffs during this era, advancing to the cup final in 1963, semi-finals in 1966 and 1967, and the quarter-finals in 1968. In 1980, the Kelly Tiremen became the Napanee Warriors. By this time, the Eastern League had become the Quinte-St. Lawrence Junior C Hockey league. The league was floundering, and in 1986 merged with the more western Central Ontario Junior C Hockey League. This left the Napanee Warriors without a local league and forced them to go on hiatus.

Alumni include Blair Jarmin, Jason Hoagle, Aaron Uens, Mike Cassleman, Dylan Bliss, Jon Hull, Scott Bradley, Todd Demerah, John Cranston, Brian Marisson, Andrew Box, Paul Butler, Ben White, Ben Carter, Isaac Brown, Scott Myers, Andrew Hamilton, Jesse Wansborough, and Brian Lyman.

== Raiders era ==
After three seasons with no junior hockey, the Eastern Ontario Junior C Hockey League was re-formed. The Napanee Raiders were its first regular-season and playoff champions in 1990.

In 1993, the Napanee Raiders forced the Ontario Hockey Association to take the far-east upstart league seriously. The Raiders finished first in the regular season with 32 wins in 35 games played. They won the league playoffs and entered the Clarence Schmalz Cup provincial playdowns. They made it to the provincial final, where they faced the Western Ontario Junior C Hockey League's Hanover Barons for Ontario's crown. The Raiders came out on top with a 4-2 series win. This marked both the Raiders' and the new league's first provincial championship.

The Raiders won the Eastern Ontario Junior C League title again in 1994 and 1995. After the 1995 championship, the league announced that they were changing their name from the Eastern Ontario Junior C Hockey League to the Empire B Junior C Hockey League. The name change was to end confusion between the league and the neighbouring Ottawa District Hockey Association's long-running Eastern Ontario Junior C Hockey League.

In 1995–96, the Napanee Raiders won their fourth straight league championship. Unlike the previous two years, the Raiders made it through to the Clarence Schmalz Cup final Their opponents were the Paris Mounties of the Niagara & District Junior C Hockey League. However, unlike the 1993 finals, the Raiders fell short of their bid for a second provincial crown, losing in the championship series, 4-1.

In the 2000-01 season, the Raiders won their sixth Empire B Junior C Hockey League championship.

In 2005-06, the Raiders finished the regular season in first place overall. They received a bye through the league quarter-finals and ended up against the second year Colborne Cobras in the league semi-final. The Raiders proved too much for the Cobras and crushed them 4-0. In the league final, the Raiders met up with the Amherstview Jets. In a long and tough series, the Raiders prevailed in game 7, winning the series 4-3. In the provincial semi-final, the Raiders ran into the Central Ontario Junior C Hockey League's Port Perry Mojacks. The Mojacks swept the Empire B champions 4-0.

The 2006-07 season saw the Napanee Raiders slip to third place overall in the regular season standings. The Raiders met the Amherstview Jets in the league semi-final. The Jets were set on avenging the 2006 finals loss to the Raiders and defeated them 4-2 to move on to the league final. During the 2006-07 season, the Raiders invited the local Canada World Youth branch along with a large contingent of Peruvians from "La Brigada de Voluntarios Bolivarianos del Peru" to attend the game The Raiders defeated the Picton Pirates 6-3 in front of their guests.

The 2007-08 season saw the Raiders win the Empire B Championship and for the first time since 1996 they defeated the Central Ontario League Champion (Georgina Ice) in the CSC QF. The Raiders fell to the Alliston Hornets (eventual CSC Champs) in five games in the CSC SF

The Raiders finished the 2008-09 season with a 20-0 home record.

The Raiders regained their league championship in 2009-10, but had similar results in the CSC playdowns. They defeated the Little Britain Merchants (Central Ontario League) in seven games but fell again to the Alliston Hornets (Georgian Mid Ontario), this time pushing them to six games.

After failing to make the playoffs for the first time in 2012-2013, the Raiders showed signs of improvement over the next three seasons under head coach Michael Hartwick. The team missed the playoffs by one point in 2013–2014, then reached the Empire B Junior C Hockey League final in two seasons, ultimately losing to Port Hope both years. The team improved its wins and points records in both seasons also.

After the 2015-16 season, the Empire B Junior C Hockey League merged with seven other leagues from Southern Ontario to form the Provincial Junior Hockey League. The former league became the Tod Division of the East conference.

The Raiders won their second Schmaltz Cup in 2019, defeating the Grimsby Peach Kings in five games.

== Season-by-season results ==
| Season | GP | W | L | T | OTL | GF | GA | P | Results | Playoffs |
|---|---|---|---|---|---|---|---|---|---|---|
| 1989-90 | 30 | 25 | 4 | 1 | - | 255 | 100 | 51 | 1st EOJCHL | Won League |
| 1990-91 | 30 | 22 | 7 | 1 | - | 191 | 123 | 45 | 1st EOJCHL | |
| 1991-92 | 30 | 27 | 0 | 3 | - | 192 | 78 | 57 | 1st EOJCHL | |
| 1992-93 | 35 | 32 | 2 | 1 | - | 282 | 97 | 67 | 1st EOJCHL | Won League, won CSC |
| 1993-94 | 36 | 24 | 9 | 3 | - | 212 | 166 | 51 | 1st EOJCHL | Won League |
| 1994-95 | 40 | 29 | 7 | - | 4 | 264 | 147 | 62 | 1st EOJCHL | Won League |
| 1995-96 | 42 | 28 | 12 | 2 | 0 | 249 | 164 | 58 | 1st EBJCHL | Won League, lost CSC final |
| 1996-97 | 42 | 31 | 9 | 2 | - | 207 | 134 | 64 | 1st EBJCHL | |
| 1997-98 | 36 | 17 | 18 | 1 | - | 144 | 157 | 35 | 4th EBJCHL | |
| 1998-99 | 36 | 13 | 18 | 3 | 2 | 142 | 155 | 31 | 3rd EBJCHL | Lost semi-final 1-4 (Pirates) |
| 1999-00 | 36 | 17 | 17 | 1 | 1 | 136 | 152 | 36 | 2nd EBJCHL | Lost semi-final 3-4 (Rebels) |
| 2000-01 | 34 | 21 | 8 | 3 | 2 | 176 | 126 | 47 | 1st EBJCHL | Won quarter-final 4-2 (Flyers); Won League 4-3 (Rebels); Lost CSC quarter-final 2-4 (Bruins) |
| 2001-02 | 36 | 20 | 14 | 0 | 2 | 150 | 149 | 42 | 1st EBJCHL | Won semi-final 4-2 (Rebels); Lost final 3-4 (Flyers) |
| 2002-03 | 34 | 11 | 19 | 1 | 3 | 150 | 191 | 26 | 3rd EBJCHL | Won semi-final 4-1 (Jets); Lost final 0-4 (Rebels) |
| 2003-04 | 34 | 19 | 12 | 2 | 1 | 172 | 147 | 41 | 2nd EBJCHL | Lost semi-final 2-4 (Jets) |
| 2004-05 | 34 | 23 | 8 | 1 | 2 | 149 | 127 | 49 | 1st EBJCHL | Lost semi-final 2-4 (Rebels) |
| 2005-06 | 34 | 24 | 6 | 4 | 0 | 206 | 112 | 52 | 1st EBJCHL | Won semi-final 4-0 (Cobras); Won League 4-3 (Jets); Lost CSC quarter-final 0-4 (Mojacks) |
| 2006-07 | 40 | 22 | 16 | 2 | 1 | 192 | 146 | 47 | 3rd EBJCHL | Lost semi-final 2-4 (Jets) |
| 2007-08 | 40 | 28 | 8 | - | 4 | 253 | 156 | 60 | 2nd EBJCHL | Won semi-final 4-0 (Rebels); Won League 4-0 (Jets); Won CSC quarter-final 4-3 (Ice); Lost CSC semi-final 1-4 (Hornets) |
| 2008-09 | 40 | 37 | 3 | - | 0 | 276 | 113 | 74 | 1st EBJCHL | Won semi-final 4-0 (Pirates); Lost finals 1-4 (Jets) |
| 2009-10 | 40 | 29 | 7 | - | 4 | 218 | 130 | 62 | 1st EBJCHL | Won semi-final 4-0 (Pirates); Won League 4-1 (Panthers); Won CSC quarter-final 4-3 (Merchants); Lost CSC semi-final 2-4 (Hornets) |
| 2010-11 | 40 | 22 | 16 | - | 2 | 171 | 149 | 46 | 1st EBJCHL | Won semi-final 4-0 (Panthers); Lost final 2-4 (Pirates) |
| 2011-12 | 40 | 16 | 18 | - | 6 | 156 | 173 | 38 | 4th EBJCHL | Lost quarter-final 2-3 (Panthers) |
| 2012-13 | 40 | 10 | 27 | - | 3 | 121 | 197 | 23 | 5th EBJCHL | DNQ |
| 2013-14 | 40 | 20 | 17 | - | 3 | 182 | 148 | 43 | 5th EBJCHL | DNQ |
| 2014-15 | 40 | 22 | 17 | 1 | - | 182 | 117 | 45 | 2nd EBJCHL | Won semi-final 4-1 (Rebels); Lost final 0-4 (Panthers) |
| 2015-16 | 40 | 24 | 12 | 4 | - | 163 | 129 | 52 | 2nd of 6 EBJCHL | Won semi-final 4-1 (Jets); Lost final 0-4 (Panthers) |
| 2016-17 | 39 | 26 | 12 | 1 | - | 199 | 94 | 53 | 2nd of 6 Tod Div-PJHL | Won semi-final 4-1 (Islanders); Lost final 0-4 (Panthers) |
| 2017-18 | 40 | 37 | 2 | 1 | - | 302 | 70 | 75 | 1st of 6 Tod Div-PJHL | Lost semi-final 3-4 (Jets) |
| 2018-19 | 44 | 38 | 4 | 1 | 1 | 264 | 71 | 78 | 1st of 6 Tod Div-PJHL | Won semi-final 4-0 (Panthers); Won League 4-0 (Pirates); Won East Conference 4-0 (Bruins); Won CSC semi-final 4-0 (Hornets); Won CSC final 4-1 (Peach Kings); PJHL Champions |
| 2019-20 | 44 | 36 | 5 | 1 | 2 | 240 | 92 | 78 | 1st of 6 Tod Div-PJHL | Won semi-final 4-0 (Islanders) incomplete final 2-0 (Pirates); Playoffs cancelled due to COVID-19 |
| 2020-21 | Season lost due to COVID-19 pandemic | | | | | | | | | |
| 2021-22 | 30 | 22 | 4 | 0 | 4 | 125 | 57 | 48 | 2nd of 6 Tod Div-PJHL | Won semi-final 4-1 (Pirates); Won final 4-3 (Jets); Lost CSC quarter-final 1-4 (Eagles) |
| 2022-23 | 41 | 35 | 5 | 1 | 0 | 218 | 113 | 71 | 1st of 6 Tod Div-PJHL | quarter-final, bye Lost semi-final 2-4 (Panthers) |
| 2023-24 | 42 | 25 | 15 | 0 | 2 | 192 | 123 | 52 | 4th of 6 Tod Div-PJHL | Won quarter-final 4-2 (Pirates); Won semi-final 4-2 (Huskies); Won League 4-0 (Panthers); Lost East Conference 2-4 (Eagles) |
| 2024-25 | 42 | 32 | 8 | 1 | 1 | 220 | 94 | 66 | 2nd of 8 Tod Div-PJHL | Won quarter-final 4-2 (Thunder); Won semi-final 4-2 (Jets); Won League 4-2 (Huskies); Won East Conference 4-0 (Eagles); Lost CSC semi-final 3-4 (Barons) |
| 2025-26 | 42 | 27 | 12 | 2 | 1 | 147 | 99 | 57 | 3rd of 7 Tod Div; 5th of 14 East Conf; 18th of 61 - PJHL | Won quarter-final 4-0 (Panthers); Lost semi-final 0-4 (Huskies) |

== Schmalz Cup Finals appearances ==
1963: New Hamburg Hahns defeated Napanee Red Wings 4-0.
1993: Napanee Raiders defeated Hanover Barons 4-2.
1996: Paris Mounties defeated Napanee Raiders 4-1.
2019: Napanee Raiders defeated Grimsby Peach Kings 4-1.
