= Picton Pirates =

Canadian junior ice hockey team

- City: Picton, Ontario, Canada
- League: Provincial Junior Hockey League
- Conference: East
- Division: Tod
- Founded: 1989
- Home arena: Prince Edward Community Centre
- Colours: Red, black, and white
- General manager: Lucas Hulton
- Head coach: Rick VanVlack

The Picton Pirates are a Junior ice hockey team based in Picton, Ontario, Canada. They play in the Tod Division of the Provincial Junior Hockey League.

== League history ==
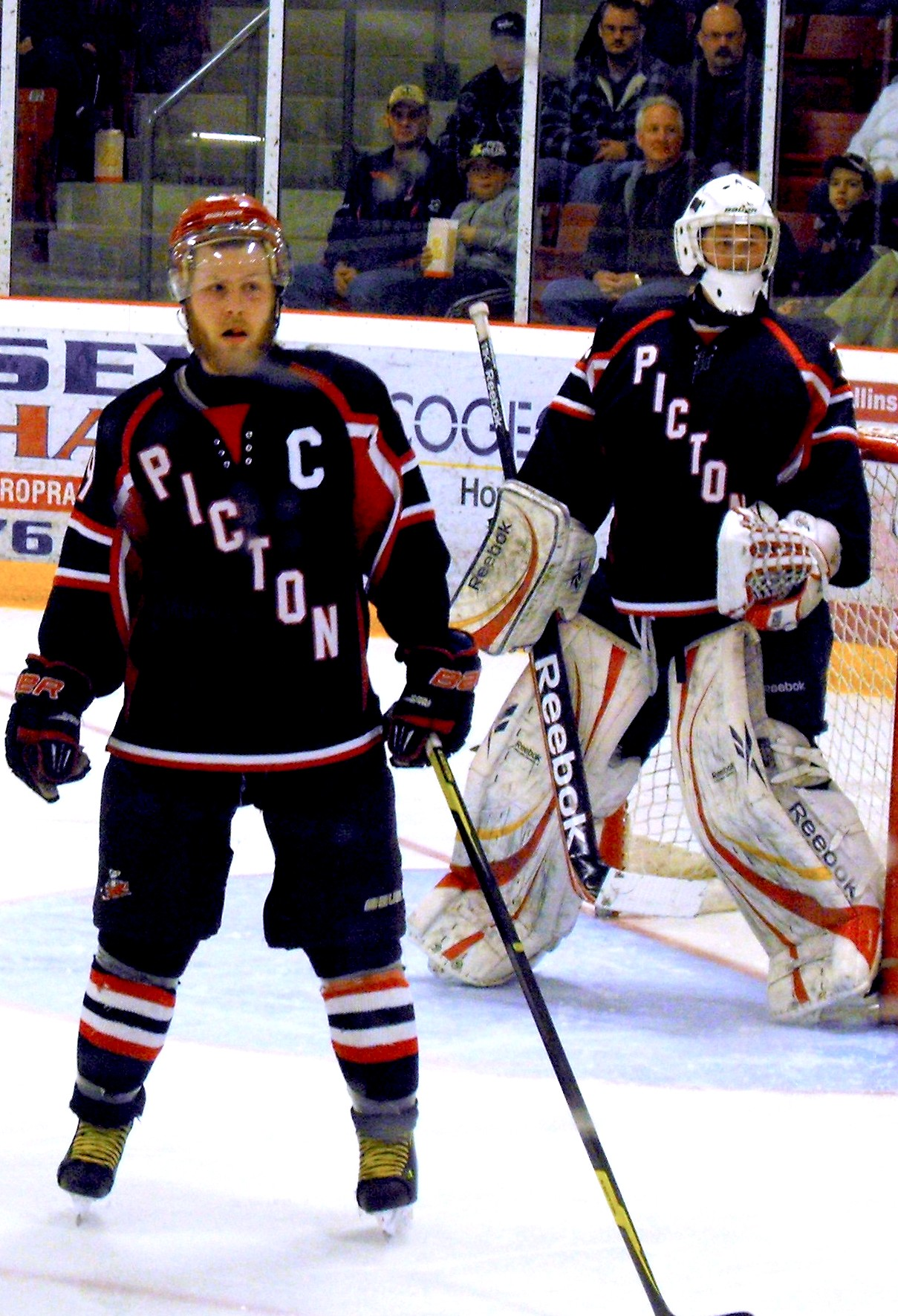
Pirates' Captain and goalie in 2013 Schmalz Cup finals in Essex, Ontario.

Nicknamed the "Patcheyes", the Picton Pirates were founded in 1989 as members of the Eastern Ontario Junior C Hockey League. In 1995, the Eastern Ontario Junior C Hockey League changed its name to the Empire B Junior C Hockey League to avoid further confusion with the rather local Ottawa District Hockey Association's Eastern Ontario Junior C Hockey League.

In 2016, the Empire B Junior C Hockey League became the Tod division of the Provincial Junior Hockey League, an amalgamation of the Southern Ontario junior 'C' leagues under a single banner.

== Team history ==
Picton Pirates 2013 Schmalz Cup Champions

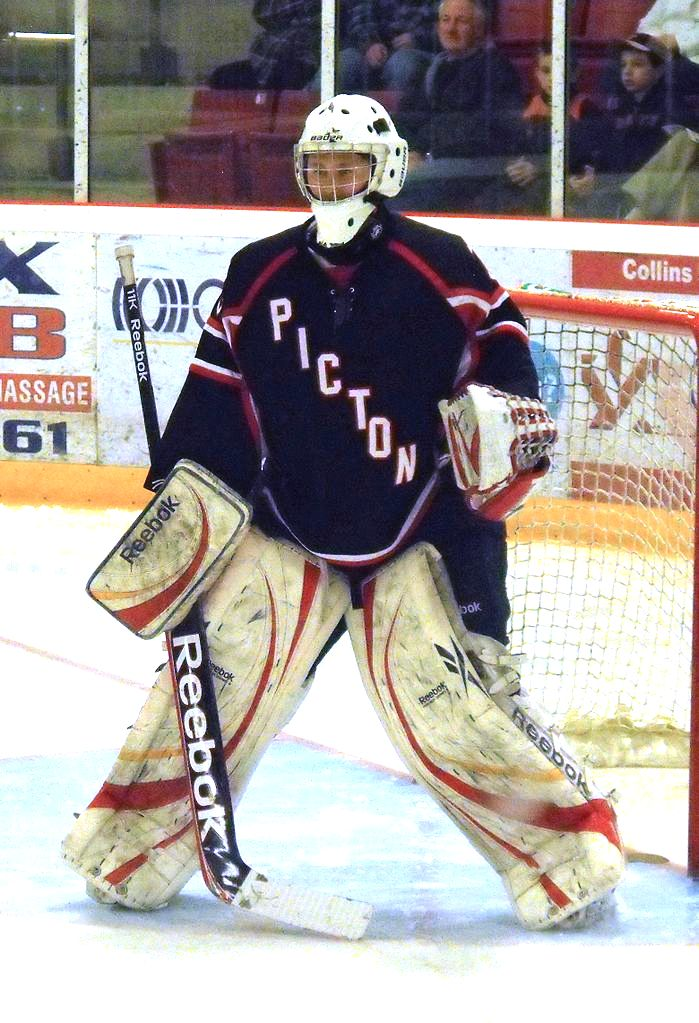
Pirates' goalie lining up for a face-off during 2013 Schmalz Cup finals.

The Pirates' first three seasons were disastrous. With nine wins in three seasons, including a winless 1991–92 season, the Pirates did not have a lot to cheer about in the early going. Finally, in the fourth season of operation, the Pirates came to life. The Pirates celebrating winning seasons for the next ten years. They capped off this strong run with their only league championship in the 1998–99 season. The Pirates were also regular season champions in 1998 and 2000.

In recent years, the Pirates' records have been up and down.

In 2005–06, the Pirates finished the regular season in fourth place. In the playoff quarter-final, the Pirates drew the upstart Colborne Cobras. The series ended up being an upset as it went the distance and the Pirates were defeated 3-games-to-2 in a best-of-five.

The 2006–07 season was not good to the Picton Pirates. They finished in fifth place, just barely outside the playoff picture.

The 2007–08 season was much of the same for the Picton Pirates. They finished in fifth place, again just barely outside the playoff picture.

The 2008–09 season was different the Picton Pirates finished fourth but was swept by the Napanee Raiders in the first round of the playoffs

The 2009–10 season was the same as the 08-09 pirates ended in fourth and again was swept by the Napanee Raiders in round 1 of the playoffs.

The 2010–11 season was a year of redemption for the 3rd place Picton Pirates and faced off with the 2nd place Amherstview Jets in round 1 beating them in 7 games 4–3, The Pirates then moved on to face the 1st place Napanee Raiders who swept the Pirates 2 years in a row, but the Pirates had other plans for the Raiders taking the first 3 games to lead the series 3–0 the Raiders would claw back with the next 2 wins making it 3–2 but the Pirates were not to be denied in Game 6 at home in front of a packed house the pirates got out to an early 4–0 lead in the first and never looked back winning game 6 5–2 and the Empire Championship series 4–2.

On May 1, 2013, the Pirates became the second team in Empire League history to win the Clarence Schmalz Cup as OHA Junior C champions, defeating the Essex 73's of the Great Lakes Junior C Hockey League 4-games-to-1.

== Season-by-season results ==
Season	GP	W	L	T	OTL	GF	GA	P	Results	Playoffs
1989-90	30	2	27	1	-	116	312	5	6th EOJCHL	
1990-91	30	7	23	0	-	141	206	14	6th EOJCHL	
1991-92	30	0	28	2	-	85	223	2	6th EOJCHL	
1992-93	35	15	15	5	-	184	181	35	3rd EOJCHL	
1993-94	36	19	12	5	-	214	159	43	2nd EOJCHL	
1994-95	40	23	15	-	2	221	177	48	3rd EOJCHL	
1995-96	42	23	14	0	5	214	173	51	4th EBJCHL	
1996-97	42	26	15	1	-	211	158	53	2nd EBJCHL	
1997-98	36	26	6	4	-	193	124	56	1st EBJCHL	
1998-99	36	23	11	1	1	172	116	48	2nd EBJCHL	Won semi-final 4-1 (Raiders); Won League 4-3 (Rebels); Lost CSC quarter-final 1-4 (Chiefs)
1999-00	36	24	11	1	0	199	140	49	1st EBJCHL	Won semi-final 4-3 (Flyers); Lost final 3-4 (Rebels)
2000-01	34	17	15	1	1	127	134	36	3rd EBJCHL	Lost semi-final 0-4 (Rebels)
2001-02	36	18	12	3	3	164	156	42	3rd EBJCHL	Lost semi-final 1-4 (Flyers)
2002-03	34	8	23	1	2	137	187	19	5th EBJCHL	Won quarter-final 2-0 (Flyers); Lost semi-final 0-4 (Rebels)
2003-04	34	18	15	0	1	145	154	37	4th EBJCHL	Won quarter-final 2-1 (Flyers); Lost semi-final 2-4 (Rebels)
2004-05	34	18	7	6	2	142	100	45	2nd EBJCHL	Lost semi-final 0-4 (Jets)
2005-06	34	13	20	1	0	129	132	27	4th EBJCHL	Lost quarter-final 2-3 (Cobras)
2006-07	40	13	27	0	3	153	211	29	5th EBJCHL	DNQ
2007-08	40	15	23	-	2	163	218	32	5th EBJCHL	DNQ
2008-09	40	15	23	-	2	151	216	32	4th EBJCHL	Lost semi-final 0-4 (Raiders)
2009-10	40	22	17	-	1	185	139	45	4th EBJCHL	Lost semi-final 0-4 (Raiders)
2010-11	40	20	16	-	4	156	150	44	3rd EBJCHL	Won semi-final 4-3 (Jets); Won League 4-2 (Raiders); Won CSC quarter-final 4-1 (Mojacks); Lost CSC semi-final 0-4 (Hornets)
2011-12	40	27	12	-	1	189	121	55	1st EBJCHL	Won semi-final 4-0 (Panthers); Lost final 4-1 (Rebels)
2012-13	40	34	4	-	2	250	80	70	1st EBJCHL	Won semi-final 4-0 (Jets); Won League 4-1 (Panthers); Won CSC quarter-final 4-3 (Chiefs); Won CSC semi-final 4-0 (Hornets); Won CSC final 4-1 (73's)
2013-14	40	36	2	-	2	230	62	74	1st EBJCHL	Won semi-final 4-2 (Rebels); Won League 4-1 (Jets); Lost CSC quarter-final 3-4 (Chiefs)
2014-15	40	21	18	1	-	173	131	43	4th EBJCHL	Lost semi-final - 1-4 - (Panthers)
2015-16	40	12	27	1	-	128	193	25	5th of 6 EBJCHL	DNQ
2016-17	40	20	19	1	-	158	143	41	4th of 6 Tod Div-PJHL	Lost div semi-final 0-4 (Panthers)
2017-18	39	24	14	1	-	200	129	49	3rd of 6 Tod Div-PJHL	Lost semi-final 0-4 (Panthers)
2018-19	44	30	12	1	1	194	123	62	2nd of 6 Tod Div-PJHL	Won semi-final 4-1 (Jets); Lost Div Finals, 0-4 (Raiders)
2019-20	44	27	15	1	1	194	130	56	2nd of 6 Tod Div-PJHL	Won semi-final, 4-0 (Jets) incomplete Div Final 0-2 (Raiders); Playoffs cancelled - COVID-19
2020-21	Season Lost due to COVID-19 pandemic									
2021-22	30	16	12	0	2	125	99	34	3rd of 6 Tod Div-PJHL	Won quarter-final 4-1 (Huskies); Lost semi-final, 1-4 (Raiders)
2022-23	42	23	15	3	1	152	119	50	3rd of 6 Tod Div-PJHL	Won quarter-final 4-0 (Rebels); Won semi-final 4-2 (Jets); Lost final 1-4 (Panthers)
2023-24	42	17	22	1	2	143	163	37	5th of 6 Tod Div-PJHL	Lost quarter-final 2-4 (Raiders)
2024-25	42	26	13	2	0	169	108	55	4th of 8 Tod Div; 6th of 15 East Conf; 23rd of 63 PJHL	Lost quarter-final 0-4 (Chiefs)
2025-26	42	18	18	6	0	132	152	42	5th of 7 Tod Div; 11th of 14 East Conf; 36th of 61 PJHL	Won quarter-final 4-3 (Jets); Lost semi-final, 0-4 (Chiefs)

== Schmalz Cup Finals appearances ==
2013: Picton Pirates defeated Essex 73's 4-games-to-1
