= Provincial Junior Hockey League =

League in Ontario

- Regions: Southern Ontario; Central Ontario
- Former names: list: Central Ontario Junior C Hockey League (1970-2016); Empire B Junior C Hockey League (1989-2016); Georgian Mid-Ontario Junior C Hockey League (1994-2016); Great Lakes Junior C Hockey League (1968-2016); Midwestern Junior C Hockey League (2013-2016); Niagara & District Junior C Hockey League (1974-2016); Southern Ontario Junior Hockey League (1960-2016); Western Ontario Junior C Hockey League (1966-2016)
- Founded: 2016
- No. of teams: 61
- Associated title: Clarence Schmalz Cup
- Recent champions: Fergus Whalers (1st) (2025-26)
- Headquarters: Cambridge, Ontario
- Website: PJHL

The Provincial Junior Hockey League (PJHL) is a Canadian junior ice hockey league spanning parts of Southern Ontario. The PJHL is the third tier of the Ontario Hockey Association and is sanctioned by the Ontario Hockey Federation and Hockey Canada. The league was formed in 2016 with the merging of eight Junior C leagues. PJHL teams compete for the Clarence Schmalz Cup.

== History ==
In the works since 2014, it was announced in the spring of 2016 that the eight Junior C leagues of the Ontario Hockey Association would merge for the 2016-17 season to create the Provincial Junior Hockey League. The union was in an effort to streamline rules across the classification and to promote growth and development.

The leagues that make up the PJHL are the former Central, Empire B, Georgian Mid-Ontario, Great Lakes, Midwestern, Niagara & District, Southern, and Western. leagues that are now the eight divisions split into four conferences.

The first game in PJHL history was played on September 9, 2016 as the Walkerton Hawks hosted the Hanover Barons in Pollock Division action. Walkerton won the game 6-2.

== Teams ==
Locations of teams competing in the 2025–26 PJHL season in Southern Ontario
C1 Alliston Hornets
O1 Clarington Eagles
S1 Amherstburg Admirals
T1 Amherstview Jets
Y1 Aylmer Spitfires
B1 Dundas Blues
D1 Dorchester Dolphins
P1 Clinton Raiders
Y2 Exeter Hawks
P2 Fergus Whalers
O2 Georgina Ice
S2 Blenheim Blades
D2 Hespeler Shamrocks
C2 Huntsville Otters
T2 Frankford Huskies
B2 Dunnville Jr. Mudcats
D3 New Hamburg Firebirds
B3 Glanbrook Rangers
P3 Hanover Barons
T3 Lakefield Chiefs
O3 Little Britain Merchants
Y3 Lucan Irish
C3 Innisfil Spartans
S3 Dresden Jr. Kings
S4 Essex 73's
D4 Norwich Merchants
B4 Grimsby Peach Kings
C4 Midland Flyers
P4 Kincardine Bulldogs
O4 Port Perry Lumberjacks
Y4 Mount Brydges Bulldogs
T4 Napanee Raiders
S5 Lakeshore Canadiens
B5 Hagersville Hawks
T5 Picton Pirates
P5 Mitchell Hawks
D5 Paris Titans
Y5 North Middlesex Stars
O5 Scarborough Knights
C5 Muskoka Bears
Y6 Petrolia Flyers
P6 Mount Forest Patriots
C6 Orillia Terriers
O6 Schomberg Cougars
D6 Tavistock Braves
B6 Niagara Riverhawks
T6 Port Hope Panthers
S6 Mooretown Flags
Y7 Port Stanley Sailors
O7 Uxbridge Bruins
S7 Walpole Island Wild
C7 Penetang Kings
B7 Port Dover Sailors
T7 Trent Hills Thunder
P7 Walkerton Capitals
D7 Wellesley Applejacks
B8 Streetsville Derbys
P8 Wingham Ironmen
C8 Stayner Siskins
S8 Wheatley Sharks
Y8 Thamesford Trojans

North Conference
Carruthers Division
Team	Centre	Founded	Arena
Alliston Hornets	Alliston	1971	New Tecumseth Recreation Complex
Huntsville Otters	Huntsville	1990	Canada Summit Centre
Innisfil Spartans	Innisfil	2022	Innisfil Recreation Complex
Midland Flyers	Midland	1978	North Simcoe Sports & Recreation Centre
Muskoka Bears	Bracebridge	2024	Muskoka Lumber Community Centre
Orillia Terriers	Orillia	2013	West Orillia Sports Complex
Penetang Kings	Penetanguishene	1977	Penetanguishene Memorial Community Centre
Stayner Siskins	Stayner	1972	Stayner Memorial Arena
Pollock Division
Team	Centre	Founded	Arena
Clinton Radars	Clinton	2026	Central Huron Community Complex
Fergus Whalers	Fergus	2023	Centre Wellington Community Sportsplex
Hanover Barons	Hanover	1964	P&H Centre
Kincardine Bulldogs	Kincardine	1994	Davidson Centre Arena
Mitchell Hawks	Mitchell	1966	Mitchell & District Arena
Mount Forest Patriots	Mount Forest	1987	Mount Forest & District Community Centre
Walkerton Capitals	Walkerton	1976	Walkerton Community Centre
Wingham Ironmen	Wingham	1975	North Huron Wescast Community Complex
South Conference
Doherty Division
Team	Centre	Founded	Arena
Dorchester Dolphins	Dorchester	2012	The Flight Exec Centre
Hespeler Shamrocks	Hespeler	1959	Hespeler Memorial Arena
New Hamburg Firebirds	New Hamburg	1953	Wilmot Township Arena
Norwich Merchants	Norwich	1968	Norwich Community Centre
Paris Titans	Paris	1985	Brant Sports Complex
Tavistock Braves	Tavistock	1970	Tavistock & District Recreation Centre
Wellesley Applejacks	Wellesley	1987	Wellesley Arena
Bloomfield Division
Team	Centre	Founded	Arena
Dundas Blues	Dundas	1963	J.L.Grightmire Arena
Dunnville Jr. Mudcats	Dunnville	1974	Dunnville Memorial Arena
Glanbrook Rangers	Glanbrook	1975	Glanbrook Arena
Grimsby Peach Kings	Grimsby	1922	Peach King Centre
Hagersville Hawks	Hagersville	1992	Hagersville Memorial Arena
Niagara Riverhawks	Chippawa	1987	Gale Centre
Port Dover Sailors	Port Dover	1988	Port Dover & Area Arena
Streetsville Derbys	Streetsville	2024	Vic Johnston Community Centre
East Conference
Orr Division
Team	Centre	Founded	Arena
Caledon Golden Hawks	Caledon	2010	Caledon East Arena
Clarington Eagles	Bowmanville	2011	Garnet B. Rickard Recreation Complex
Georgina Ice	Keswick	1994	Georgina Ice Palace
Little Britain Merchants	Little Britain	1978	Little Britain Community Centre
Port Perry Lumberjacks	Port Perry	1972	Scugog Community Recreation Centre
Schomberg Cougars	Schomberg	1969	Trisan Centre
Uxbridge Bruins	Uxbridge	1975	Uxbridge Arena and Recreation Centre
Tod Division
Team	Centre	Founded	Arena
Amherstview Jets	Amherstview	1989	W J Henderson Recreation Centre
Frankford Huskies	Frankford	2021	Frankford Arena
Lakefield Chiefs	Lakefield	1980	Lakefield-Smith Community Centre
Napanee Raiders	Napanee	1989	Strathcona Paper Centre
Picton Pirates	Picton	1989	Prince Edward Community Centre
Port Hope Panthers	Port Hope	2004	Jack Burger Sports Complex
Trent Hills Thunder	Campbellford	1992	Campbellford-Seymour Arena
West Conference
Stobbs Division
Team	Centre	Founded	Arena
Amherstburg Admirals	Amherstburg	1987	Libro Centre
Blenheim Blades	Blenheim	1968	Blenheim Community & Recreation Centre
Dresden Jr. Kings	Dresden	1959	Lambton-Kent Memorial Arena
Essex 73's	Essex	1973	Essex Centre Sports Complex
Lakeshore Canadiens	Belle River	1978	Atlas Tube Centre
Mooretown Flags	Mooretown	1971	Mooretown Sports Complex
Walpole Island Wild	Walpole Island	1972	Walpole Island Sports Complex
Wheatley Sharks	Wheatley	1995	Wheatley Area Arena
Yeck Division
Team	Centre	Founded	Arena
Aylmer Spitfires	Aylmer	1974	East Elgin Community Complex
Exeter Hawks	Exeter	1961	South Huron Recreation Centre
Lucan Irish	Lucan	1968	Lucan Community Memorial Centre
Mount Brydges Bulldogs	Mount Brydges	1975	Tri-Township Arena
North Middlesex Stars	Parkhill	1993	North Middlesex Arena
Petrolia Flyers	Petrolia	1988	Greenwood Recreation Centre
Port Stanley Sailors	Port Stanley	1969	Port Stanley Arena
Thamesford Trojans	Thamesford	1976	Thamesford Area Recreation Centre

== Regular season champions ==
Bolded is overall PJHL season champion based on win percentage.

	East				North				South				West			
Season	Orr	Pct	Tod	Pct	Carruthers	Pct	Pollock	Pct	Bloomfield	Pct	Doherty	Pct	Stobbs	Pct	Yeck	Pct
2016-17	Lakefield	.805	Port Hope	.910	Stayner	.917	Walkerton	.819	Grimsby	.869	Ayr	.925	Lakeshore	.788	**Dorchester**	**.988**
2017-18	Lakefield	.857	Napanee	.938	**Stayner**	**.952**	Mount Forest	.800	Glanbrook	.905	Ayr	.825	Lakeshore	.738	Lambeth	.872
2018-19	Uxbridge	.810	**Napanee**	**.886**	Stayner	.786	Mount Forest	.774	Glanbrook	.881	Tavistock	.838	Essex	.788	Dorchester	.775
2019-20	Clarington	.726	Napanee	.852	Alliston	.857	Mount Forest	.810	Grimsby	.774	Tavistock	.800	**Lakeshore**	**.900**	Thamesford	.714
2020-21	Cancelled due to the COVID-19 pandemic															
2021-22	Little Britain	.797	Amherstview	.833	Stayner	.850	Hanover	.828	Grimsby	.700	Woodstock	.792	**Lakeshore**	**.906**	Exeter	.783
2022-23	Clarington	.854	Napanee	.866	**Stayner**	**.900**	Mount Forest	.774	Glanbrook	.881	New Hamburg	.798	Essex	.881	Mount Brydges	.775
2023-24	Clarington	.857	Frankford	.762	Alliston	.857	**Hanover**	**.881**	Grimsby	.798	New Hamburg	.810	**Lakeshore**	**.881**	Thamesford	.763
2024-25	Clarington	.845	Frankford	.810	**Alliston**	**.976**	Hanover	.893	Dundas	.845	Norwich	.810	Essex	.893	Petrolia	.702
2025-26	Uxbridge	.845	Lakefield	.738	Stayner	.774	Fergus	.821	Dundas	.821	Woodstock	.750	**Essex**	**.893**	Exeter	.679

== Playoffs division and conference champions ==
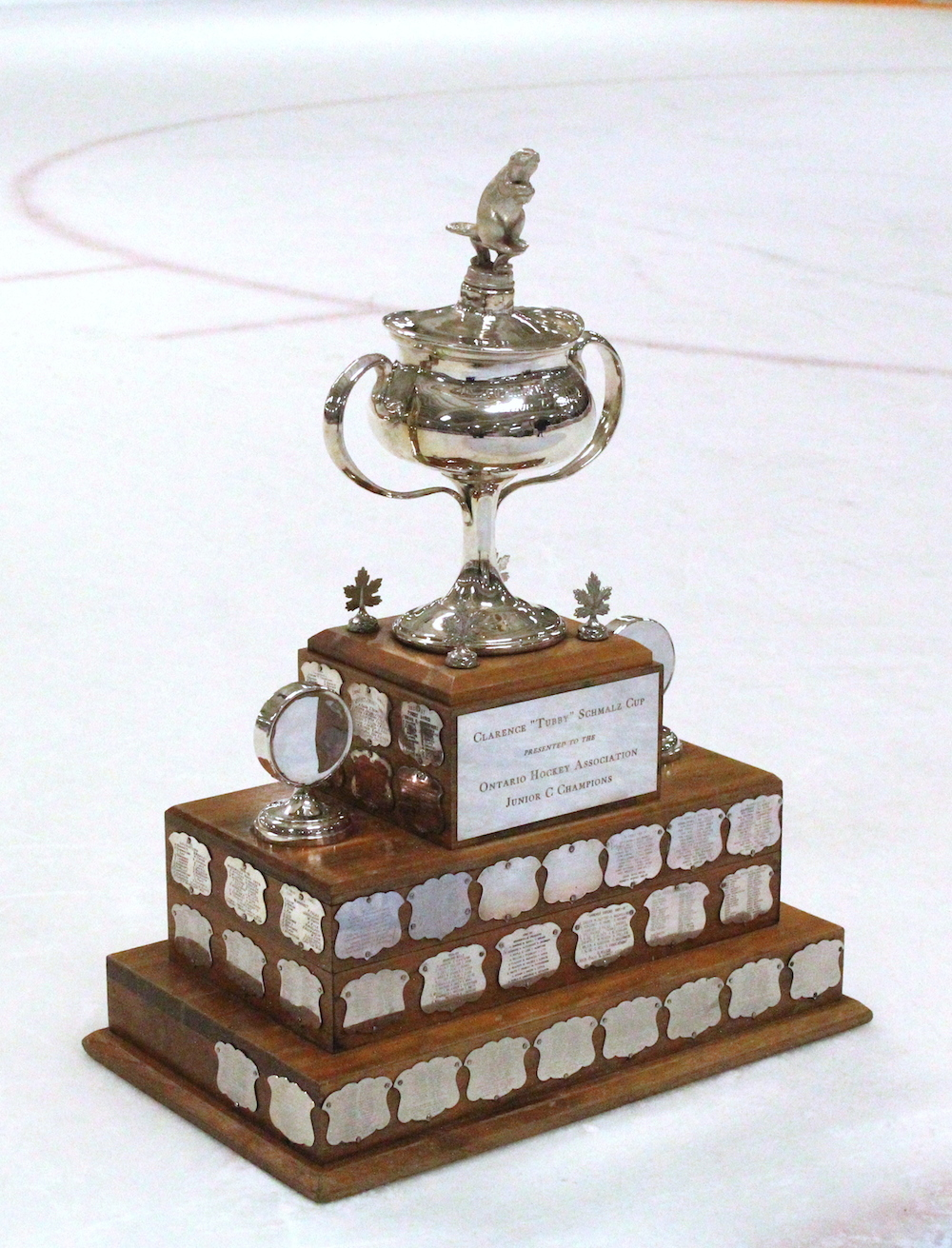
Clarence Schmalz Cup, emblematic of the Junior C championship of the Ontario Hockey Association and the PJHL.

Listed are Division playoff champions. Bolded are also Conference playoff champions.

	East		North		South		West	
Season	Orr	Tod	Carruthers	Pollock	Doherty	Bloomfield	Stobbs	Yeck
2017	Lakefield	**Port Hope**	**Alliston**	Mount Forest	**Ayr**	Grimsby	**Essex**	Dorchester
2018	**Lakefield**	Port Hope	**Stayner**	Mount Forest	Tavistock	**Glanbrook**	Lakeshore	**Lambeth**
2019	Uxbridge	**Napanee**	**Alliston**	Mount Forest	Wellesley	**Grimsby**	Lakeshore	**Exeter**
2020	Cancelled due to the COVID-19 pandemic							
2021	Cancelled due to the COVID-19 pandemic							
2022	**Clarington**	Napanee	**Stayner**	Mitchell	New Hamburg	**Grimsby**	**Lakeshore**	North Middlesex
2023	**Clarington**	Port Hope	**Stayner**	Mount Forest	**Wellesley**	Glanbrook	**Lakeshore**	Thamesford
2024	**Clarington**	Napanee	Alliston	**Hanover**	**New Hamburg**	Grimsby	**Lakeshore**	Thamesford
2025	Clarington	**Napanee**	Orillia	**Hanover**	**New Hamburg**	Grimsby	**Essex**	Petrolia
2026	Uxbridge	**Frankford**	Stayner	**Fergus**	**Tavistock**	Dundas	**Lakeshore**	Mount Brydges

== League championship series ==
Bolded is winner of Clarence Schmalz Cup as PJHL and OHA champion.

Season	North/East champion	South/West champion	Series (Best of 7)	Scores
2017	Port Hope Panthers	**Ayr Centennials** {1st}	2-4	8-1, 4-1, **2-4**, **1-3**, **1-4**, **3-6**
2018	**Lakefield Chiefs** {1st}	Glanbrook Rangers	4-1	**2-1** OT, 2-3, **4-3** OT, **5-2**, **4-0**
2019	**Napanee Raiders** {1st}	Grimsby Peach Kings	4-1	**2-0**, 2-3, **3-1**, **4-1**, **3-1**
2020	Cancelled due to the COVID-19 pandemic.			
2021	Cancelled due to the COVID-19 pandemic.			
**Championship Tournament**
Season	Champion	Finalist	Score	Location
2022	**Lakeshore Canadiens** {1st}	Clarington Eagles	3-2 OT	Guelph, Ontario
2023	**Wellesley Applejacks** {1st}	Clarington Eagles	3-2	Woodstock, Ontario
Season	North/East champion	South/West champion	Series (Best of 7)	Scores
2024	Clarington Eagles	**Lakeshore Canadiens** {2nd}	1-4	1-0, **1-2**, **2-3**, **2-4**, **4-5**
2025	**Hanover Barons** (1st)	Essex 73's	4-0	**6-1**, **2-1**, **4-0**, **5-4** OT
2026	**Fergus Whalers** (1st)	Tavistock Braves	4-1	**2-1** OT, 2-3 OT, **7-4**, **6-5**, **4-3** OT
