= Jay McKee =

Canadian ice hockey player (born 1977)

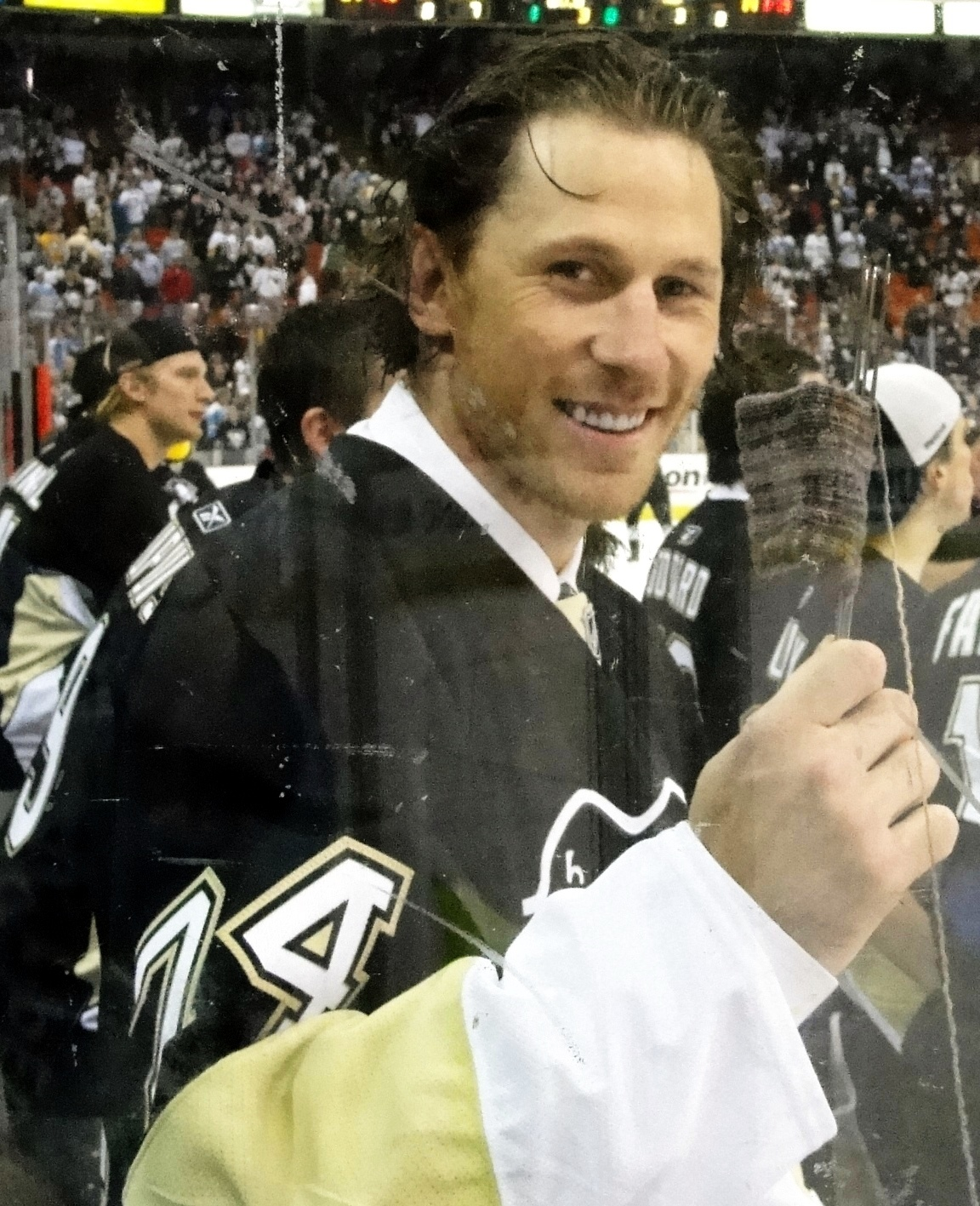
- McKee with the Pittsburgh Penguins in 2010.
- Born: September 8, 1977 (age 48) Kingston, Ontario, Canada
- Height: 6 ft 3 in (191 cm)
- Weight: 199 lb (90 kg; 14 st 3 lb)
- Position: Defence
- Shot: Left
- Played for: Buffalo Sabres; St. Louis Blues; Pittsburgh Penguins
- Current AHL coach: Hamilton Hammers
- Coached for: Rochester Americans; Erie Otters; Kitchener Rangers; Hamilton/Brantford Bulldogs
- NHL draft: 14th overall, 1995; Buffalo Sabres
- Playing career: 1993–2010

Jay McKee (born September 8, 1977) is a Canadian coach of the Hamilton Hammers of the American Hockey League and former professional ice hockey defenceman. He spent the majority of his career with the Buffalo Sabres of the National Hockey League (NHL), and has also played for the St. Louis Blues and Pittsburgh Penguins. Throughout his career, he has been noted among the NHL's best shot-blockers. McKee was born in Kingston, Ontario, but grew up in Loyalist, Ontario.

After his retirement from playing, he has served as an assistant coach for the NCAA's Niagara Purple Eagles, AHL's Rochester Americans, the Ontario Hockey League's (OHL) Erie Otters and the OHL's Kitchener Rangers. After one season in Kitchener, he was promoted to head coach of the Rangers, where he served for three-and-a-half seasons. He was then named the head coach of the OHL's Hamilton Bulldogs in 2021. He remained with the Bulldogs as they relocated and became the Brantford Bulldogs until 2026. On May 29, 2026, the New York Islanders named McKee the head coach of their new AHL affiliate, the Hamilton Hammers.

== Playing career ==
=== Junior hockey ===
==== Sudbury Wolves (1993–1995) ====
McKee was drafted by the Sudbury Wolves of the Ontario Hockey League in the first round, tenth overall, at the 1993 OHL Priority Selection. In his rookie season with the Wolves during the 1993–94 season, McKee recorded 1 assist in 51 games while accumulating 51 penalty minutes. In three playoff games, McKee was held to no points.

He began the 1994–95 season in Sudbury, as McKee saw his offensive game develop. In 39 games with the Wolves, McKee scored 6 goals and 12 points while earning 91 penalty minutes. Midway through the season, McKee was traded to the Niagara Falls Thunder in a deal that sent Ethan Moreau and Jason Bonsignore to Sudbury.

==== Niagara Falls Thunder (1994–1996) ====
McKee concluded the 1994–95 season with the Niagara Falls Thunder. In 26 games with the Thunder, McKee scored 3 goals and 16 points. Combined with his Sudbury stats, McKee appeared in 65 games, scoring 9 goals and 28 points, a significant improvement from his rookie season. In the playoffs, McKee scored two goals and five points in six games.

McKee played the 1995–96 season with the Thunder, during which he scored 5 goals and 46 points in 64 games, the second-highest point total by a defenseman on the team, while earning 129 penalty minutes. In the playoffs, McKee had one goal and six points in ten games. Following the season, McKee was named as an OHL Second Team All-Star.

=== Professional career ===
==== Buffalo Sabres (1995–2006) ====
McKee was drafted by the Buffalo Sabres in the first round, 14th overall, at the 1995 NHL entry draft held at the Edmonton Coliseum in Edmonton. The pick used to select McKee was acquired in the July 8, 1995 trade that sent Alexander Mogilny to the Vancouver Canucks. Vancouver also received a 5th round pick (Todd Norman), while Buffalo received Michael Peca and Michael Wilson.

The Sabres assigned McKee to his junior club, the Niagara Falls Thunder, for the 1995–96 season. After the Thunder were eliminated from the playoffs, McKee appeared in four games with the Rochester Americans, the Sabres' American Hockey League (AHL) affiliate, during the 1995–96 season. McKee earned an assist with Rochester. McKee also made his NHL debut on April 10, 1996, and earned one assist on a goal scored by Dane Jackson, as the Sabres defeated the Ottawa Senators 5–2. This would be McKee's only NHL game during the 1995–96 season.

McKee played seven games with the Americans during the 1996–97 season, scoring two goals and seven points. He spent a majority of the 1996–97 season with Buffalo, and on November 11, 1996, McKee recorded his first career multi-point game with two assists in a 3–2 win over the Florida Panthers. On March 22, McKee earned his first career NHL goal, scoring against John Vanbiesbrouck of the Florida Panthers in a 3–2 loss. Overall, in 43 games with the Sabres, McKee scored one goal and ten points. On April 19, 1997, McKee made his NHL playoff debut in a 3–1 loss to the Ottawa Senators. McKee would eventually play in three playoff games and earned no points.

In the 1997–98 season, McKee played 13 games with Rochester, scoring a goal and eight points. McKee spent most of the season with the Sabres, scoring 1 goal and 14 points in 56 games. McKee appeared in one playoff game with Buffalo, earning no points.

For the first time in his career, McKee spent the entire season in the NHL during the 1998–99 season. In 72 games with the Sabres, McKee earned six assists while registering 75 penalty minutes, helping Buffalo reach the playoffs. On May 9, 1999, McKee earned his first playoff point, an assist on a goal scored by Dixon Ward, as the Sabres defeated the Boston Bruins 4–1. In 21 playoff games, McKee recorded three assists while leading the NHL with a +13 rating as the Sabres reached the 1999 Stanley Cup Finals, where they were defeated by the Dallas Stars in six games.

In the 1999–2000 season, McKee played in 78 games with the Sabres, scoring a career-high 5 goals and 17 points. A late season injury limited McKee's playing time in the 2000 playoffs, appearing in only one game and getting no points.

McKee continued his solid defensive play during the 2000–01 season. In 74 games, he scored 1 goal and 11 points while setting a career-high with 76 penalty minutes. On April 14, 2001, McKee scored his first career playoff goal, as he scored the overtime winner against Roman Čechmánek of the Philadelphia Flyers in a 4–3 victory. Overall, in eight playoff games, McKee finished with the one goal. Injuries limited McKee's playing time, as he missed the final five playoff games after a collision with Mario Lemeiux of the Pittsburgh Penguins.

During the 2001–02 season, McKee played in a career high 81 games. McKee scored 2 goals and 13 points while finishing with a team-best +18 rating. However, the Sabres failed to qualify for the 2002 playoffs.

McKee battled injuries during the 2002–03 season and was limited to 59 games, in which he recorded five assists. The Sabres once again finished out of the playoffs. Injuries continued to plague McKee during the 2003–04 season and played in only 43 games, scoring two goals and five points. Buffalo missed the playoffs for the third consecutive season.

McKee did not playing during the 2004–05 season due to the 2004–05 NHL lock-out that cancelled the entire season.

In 2005–06, when NHL play resumed, McKee was named an alternate captain for the Sabres. He played in 75 games, tying his career high with five goals, while earning 16 points, as the Sabres reached the playoffs for the first time since 2001. In the playoffs, McKee scored two goals and five points, which set career highs, in 17 games before the Sabres lost to the Carolina Hurricanes in the Eastern Conference finals. McKee missed the seventh and final game of the Eastern Conference finals as he was sidelined with a severe infection in his leg reportedly caused by a cut or bruise sustained from blocking a shot in an earlier round of the playoffs. McKee revealed in 2020 that the infection was so severe that his leg would have been amputated had it worsened.

Following the season, McKee became a free agent.

==== St. Louis Blues (2006–2009) ====
On July 1, 2006, McKee signed a four-year, $16 million contract with the St. Louis Blues. An early season injury delayed McKee's debut with St. Louis until his first game with the team on October 20, 2006, where McKee played only 1:15 in a 3–2 overtime loss to the Vancouver Canucks. Injuries continued to plague McKee during the 2006–07 season as he suffered various injuries including a knee injury, a broken finger, and two lower body injuries. In 23 games with St. Louis, McKee did not record any points.

McKee rebounded in the 2007–08 season, scoring two goals and nine points in 66 games. On October 23, 2007, McKee recorded his first point with the Blues in an assist on a goal scored by Keith Tkachuk during a 4–2 win over the Anaheim Ducks. On November 1, McKee scored his first goal as a member of the team, scoring the game-winning third period goal against Josh Harding of the Minnesota Wild in a 3–2 victory. McKee finished the season with two goals and nine points and the Blues did not qualify for the post-season.

In 2008–09, McKee played in 69 games, his highest total since 2005–06, and scored a goal and eight points helping St. Louis reach the post-season for the first time since 2004. On April 15, 2009, McKee skated in his first playoff game with the Blues in a 2–1 loss to the Vancouver Canucks. In four playoff games, McKee had no points.

Following the 2008–09 season, the Blues bought out the final year of McKee's contract, making him a free agent.

==== Pittsburgh Penguins (2009–2010) ====
On July 9, 2009, McKee signed a one-year, $800,000 contract with the defending Stanley Cup champions, the Pittsburgh Penguins. On October 2, 2009, McKee made his Penguins debut, as he was held to no points in a 3–2 win over the New York Rangers. Ten days later, on October 12, McKee earned his first point as a member of the Penguins, an assist on a goal by Tyler Kennedy, in a 4–1 win over the Ottawa Senators. On November 14, McKee scored his first goal with Pittsburgh as he scored the opening goal in the first period against Tim Thomas of the Boston Bruins, as Pittsburgh won the game 6–5 in overtime. In 62 games with the Penguins, McKee scored a goal and ten points, his highest point total since the 2005–06 season with the Sabres. McKee made his post-season debut with the Penguins on April 18, 2010, in a 4-2 win over the Ottawa Senators. McKee finished the playoffs appearing in five games and earning no points.

Following the season, McKee became a free agent. McKee went unsigned during the 2010 off-season, in which he announced he would volunteer as a coach with the Niagara Purple Eagles men's ice hockey, while not ruling out a return to the NHL.

==== Dundas Real McCoys (2012–2014) ====
McKee returned to playing hockey and signed with the Senior "AAA" team, the Dundas Real McCoys of the Allan Cup Hockey league. In the 2012–13 season, McKee appeared in four games, earning an assist. In the playoffs, McKee earned seven assists in ten games for Dundas.

In the 2013–14 season, McKee became a player-coach for the club. In eight games during the regular season, McKee scored a goal and five points. In three playoff games, McKee had a goal and two points, as the team reached the Allan Cup. McKee appeared in four games in the Allan Cup, earning no points, however, the club won the championship.

Following the season, McKee announced his retirement from playing.

== Career statistics ==
			Regular season					Playoffs
Season	Team	League	GP	G	A	Pts	PIM	GP	G	A	Pts	PIM
1992–93	Ernestown Jets	EOJHL	36	0	17	17	37	—	—	—	—	—
1992–93	Kingston Voyageurs	MetJHL	1	0	0	0	0	—	—	—	—	—
1993–94	Sudbury Wolves	OHL	51	0	1	1	51	3	0	0	0	0
1994–95	Sudbury Wolves	OHL	39	6	6	12	91	—	—	—	—	—
1994–95	Niagara Falls Thunder	OHL	26	3	13	16	60	6	2	3	5	10
1995–96	Niagara Falls Thunder	OHL	64	5	41	46	129	10	1	5	6	16
1995–96	Rochester Americans	AHL	4	0	1	1	15	—	—	—	—	—
1995–96	Buffalo Sabres	NHL	1	0	1	1	2	—	—	—	—	—
1996–97	Rochester Americans	AHL	7	2	5	7	4	—	—	—	—	—
1996–97	Buffalo Sabres	NHL	43	1	9	10	35	3	0	0	0	0
1997–98	Rochester Americans	AHL	13	1	7	8	11	—	—	—	—	—
1997–98	Buffalo Sabres	NHL	56	1	13	14	42	1	0	0	0	0
1998–99	Buffalo Sabres	NHL	72	0	6	6	75	21	0	3	3	24
1999–2000	Buffalo Sabres	NHL	78	5	12	17	50	1	0	0	0	0
2000–01	Buffalo Sabres	NHL	74	1	10	11	76	8	1	0	1	6
2001–02	Buffalo Sabres	NHL	81	2	11	13	43	—	—	—	—	—
2002–03	Buffalo Sabres	NHL	59	0	5	5	49	—	—	—	—	—
2003–04	Buffalo Sabres	NHL	43	2	3	5	41	—	—	—	—	—
2005–06	Buffalo Sabres	NHL	75	5	11	16	57	17	2	3	5	30
2006–07	St. Louis Blues	NHL	23	0	0	0	12	—	—	—	—	—
2007–08	St. Louis Blues	NHL	66	2	7	9	42	—	—	—	—	—
2008–09	St. Louis Blues	NHL	69	1	7	8	44	4	0	0	0	4
2009–10	Pittsburgh Penguins	NHL	62	1	9	10	54	5	0	0	0	2
2012–13	Dundas Real McCoys	ACH	4	0	1	1	2	10	0	7	7	5
2013–14	Dundas Real McCoys	ACH	8	1	4	5	0	3	1	1	2	0
2013–14	Dundas Real McCoys	AC	—	—	—	—	—	4	0	0	0	4
NHL totals			802	21	104	125	622	60	3	6	9	66

== Coaching career ==
=== Rochester Americans (2011–2012) ===
On August 31, 2011, McKee was hired as an assistant coach of the Rochester Americans, the American Hockey League affiliate of the Buffalo Sabres. In the 2011–12 season, the Americans finished second in the North Division with a 36–26–10–4 record, earning 86 points. In the post-season, the Americans were swept by the Toronto Marlies in three games. Following the season, McKee left the club to spend more time with his family, and joined the Senior "AAA" Dundas Real McCoys of the Allan Cup Hockey league.

=== Erie Otters (2014–2015) ===
On June 13, 2014, McKee with hired to be an assistant coach with the Erie Otters of the Ontario Hockey League (OHL). In the 2014–15 season, the Otters, led by Connor McDavid, earned a record of 50–14–4, as the team accumulated 104 points and had the best record in the Midwest Division. In the post-season, Erie lost to the Oshawa Generals in the J. Ross Robertson Cup finals in five games. Following the season, McKee left his job with the Otters, as the Kitchener Rangers hired him as an associate coach.

=== Kitchener Rangers (2015–2019) ===
McKee joined the OHL's Kitchener Rangers as an associate coach for the 2015–16 season. In his first season with the club, McKee helped Kitchener to a 44–17–7 record, earning 95 points, and fourth place in the Western Conference. In the post-season, the Rangers were swept by the London Knights in the second round. Following the season, Rangers head coach Mike Van Ryn stepped down as head coach of the team. On May 12, 2016, McKee was named the new head coach of the Rangers.

McKee made his head coaching debut on September 23, 2016, as he guided the Rangers to a 4–2 victory over the Flint Firebirds for his first career OHL victory. The Rangers finished the 2016–17 season with a 36–27–5 record, earning 77 points and sixth place in the Western Conference. On March 24, 2017, McKee coached his first career playoff game, where Kitchener lost to the Owen Sound Attack 9–1. The next night, McKee earned his first career playoff win as the Rangers defeated the Attack 2–1. The Rangers then lost to Owen Sound in five games in their first round series.

Kitchener had a very strong season in 2017–18 as the club finished in first place in the Midwest Division with a 43–21–4 record, earning 90 points and finished in second place in the Western Conference. This was the first time since 2008 that the Rangers finished in first place in their division. In the post-season, Kitchener defeated the Guelph Storm and Sarnia Sting to face the Sault Ste. Marie Greyhounds in the Western Conference finals. The two teams played a full seven game series, where the Greyhounds defeated the Rangers in double overtime in the seventh game.

The Rangers slid down the standings in the 2018–19 season as the club finished the season with a 34–30–4 record, earning 72 points and fifth place in the Western Conference. The team was swept by the Guelph Storm in the first round of the post-season.

McKee returned to Kitchener for the 2019–20 season, but was fired on November 25, 2019, after a 7–10–4 start to the season with the Rangers were in last place in the Western Conference.

=== Hamilton/Brantford Bulldogs (2021–2026) ===
On July 6, 2021, McKee was hired as the head coach of the OHL's Hamilton Bulldogs. In his first season with the Bulldogs in 2021-22, McKee led Hamilton to a 51-12-3-2 record, earning 107 points and winning the Hamilton Spectator Trophy as the team had the best record in the league. In the post-season, the Bulldogs swept the Peterborough Petes, Mississauga Steelheads and North Bay Battalion to earn a berth in the OHL finals. In the final round, Hamilton defeated the Windsor Spitfires in seven games to win the J. Ross Robertson Cup and qualified for the 2022 Memorial Cup. At the Memorial Cup, the Bulldogs finished in third place in the round-robin with a 1-0-0-2 record, earning three points. In the semi-final game, Hamilton defeated the Shawinigan Cataractes 4-3 in overtime. In the final game, Hamilton lost to the Saint John Sea Dogs 6-3 to finish in second place.

The Bulldogs underwent a rebuilding season in 2022-23, trading away some top ranked players for draft picks and prospects. The club finished the year with a 33-30-5-0 record, earning 71 points and sixth place in the Eastern Conference. In the post-season, the Bulldogs lost to the Barrie Colts in six games in the conference quarter-finals. During the season, the Bulldogs announced they were moving to Brantford, Ontario beginning in the 2023-24 season.

In their first season in Brantford, McKee remained the head coach of the Bulldogs. In the 2023-24 season, the Bulldogs finished third in the Eastern Conference with a 37-20-9-2 record, earning 85 points. In the playoffs, Brantford was upset by the sixth seeded Ottawa 67's in six games in the conference quarter-finals.

The Bulldogs improved in the 2024-25 season, finishing the season in first place in the Eastern Conference with a 44-19-5-0 record, earning 93 points. In the post-season, the Bulldogs defeated the North Bay Battalion in five games in the conference quarter-finals before falling to the Oshawa Generals in six games in the conference semi-finals.

Brantford had an excellent 2025-26 season, winning the Hamilton Spectator Trophy as the club finished with the best record in the league at 48-10-10, earning 106 points. In the playoffs, the Bulldogs swept the Sudbury Wolves and North Bay Battalion in the conference quarter-finals and semi-finals respectively, however, Brantford was upset by the Barrie Colts in the conference finals, losing in seven games.

=== Hamilton Hammers (2026-pres) ===
On May 29, 2026, McKee was named the head coach of the Hamilton Hammers of the American Hockey League.

=== Coaching ===
Season	Team	League	Regular season						Postseason
Season	Team	League	G	W	L	OTL	Pts	Division rank	Result
2016–17	Kitchener Rangers	OHL	68	36	27	5	77	4th, Midwest Division	Lost in conference quarter-finals (1–4 vs. OS)
2017–18	Kitchener Rangers	OHL	68	43	21	4	90	1st, Midwest Division	Won in conference quarter-finals (4–2 vs. GUE); Won in conference semi-finals (4–2 vs. SAR); Lost in conference finals (3–4 vs. SSM)
2018–19	Kitchener Rangers	OHL	68	34	30	4	72	3rd, Midwest Division	Lost in conference quarter-finals (0–4 vs. GUE)
2019–20	Kitchener Rangers	OHL	21	7	10	4	18	5th, Midwest Division	Fired
2021–22	Hamilton Bulldogs	OHL	68	51	12	5	107	1st, East Division	Won in conference quarter-finals (4-0 vs. PBO); Won in conference semi-finals (4-0 vs. MIS); Won in conference finals (4-0 vs. NB); Won J. Ross Robertson Cup (4-3 vs. WSR); Finished 3rd at 2022 Memorial Cup (1-2); Won 2022 Memorial Cup semi-final (4-3 vs. SHA); Lost 2022 Memorial Cup final (3-6 vs. SJS)
2022–23	Hamilton Bulldogs	OHL	68	33	30	5	71	3rd, East Division	Lost in conference quarter-finals (2-4 vs. BAR)
2023–24	Brantford Bulldogs	OHL	68	37	20	11	85	2nd, East Division	Lost in conference quarter-finals (2-4 vs. OTT)
2024–25	Brantford Bulldogs	OHL	68	44	19	5	93	1st, East Division	Won in conference quarter-finals (4-1 vs. NB); Lost in conference semi-finals (2-4 vs. OSH)
2025–26	Brantford Bulldogs	OHL	68	48	10	10	106	1st, East Division	Won in conference quarter-finals (4-0 vs. SBY); Won in conference semi-finals (4-0 vs. NB); Lost in conference finals (3-4 vs. BAR)
Kitchener Rangers totals			225	120	88	17	257	1 division title	12–16 (0.429) - 0 J. Ross Robertson Cups
Hamilton/Brantford Bulldogs totals			340	213	91	36	462	3 division titles	37–20 (0.649) - 1 J. Ross Robertson Cup 2-3 (0.400) - 0 Memorial Cups
OHL totals			565	333	179	53	719	4 division titles	49–36 (0.557) - 1 J. Ross Robertson Cup 2-3 (0.400) - 0 Memorial Cups

Preceded by Wayne Primeau	Buffalo Sabres first-round draft pick 1995	Succeeded by Martin Biron
