= Amherstview Jets =

Canadian junior ice hockey team

- City: Amherstview, Ontario
- League: Provincial Junior Hockey League
- Conference: East
- Division: Tod
- Founded: 1989
- Home arena: Henderson Recreation Centre
- Colours: Green, Black, Yellow, and White
- President: Tracy Platt-Barr
- General manager: Evan Robinson
- Head coach: Evan Robinson

Franchise history
- 1989–99: Ernestown Jets; 1999–pres: Amherstview Jets

Previous franchise history
- 1970s–82: Ernestown Jets; 1982–84: Ernestown Dynamiters

Championships
- League champions: 1992, 2005, 2007 and 2009

The Amherstview Jets are a Canadian Junior ice hockey team based in Amherstview, Ontario, Canada. As of the 2016–17 hockey season they play in the Provincial Junior Hockey League of the Ontario Hockey Association. Prior to that they were members of the Empire B Junior C Hockey League. This league became the Tod Division (East Conference) of the Provincial Junior Hockey League.

== History ==
The Amherstview Jets originated in the 1970s as the Ernestown Jets, in the Township of Ernestown, Ontario, now known as the Township of Loyalist, Ontario. Amherstview is a community within Loyalist Township. The Jets originated as a member of the Quinte-St. Lawrence Junior C Hockey League.

In 1982, the Ernestown Jets changed their names to the Ernestown Dynamiters. In 1984, as the Quinte-St. Lawrence league was in decline, the Ernestown franchise went on hiatus. The Quinte-St. Lawrence league fell apart in 1986 and merged with the Central Ontario Junior C Hockey League to the West and left the franchise without a local league to join.

In 1989, the Eastern Ontario Junior C Hockey League was founded. The Ernestown Jets were resurrected and joined the upstart league that season.

The first two seasons for the Jets were both losing seasons, but the 1991-92 season saw Ernestown finish the season in second place with seventeen wins in a thirty-game season. The Jets went on to win the league championship under the guidance of Coach Randy Stewart.

In 1995, the Eastern Ontario Junior C Hockey League became the Empire B Junior C Hockey League to avoid further confusion with Ottawa District Hockey Association's Eastern Ontario Junior C Hockey League.

In 1999, after ten seasons as the Ernestown Jets, the Jets changed their name to become the Amherstview Jets.

The 2004-05 season ended with the Amherstview Jets in third place, in the end they were league champions. They moved on to the Clarence Schmalz Cup provincial quarter-final. Their opponent in the quarter-final was the Central Ontario Junior C Hockey League's Uxbridge Bruins. The Bruins swept the Jets 4-games-to-none.

In 2005-06, the Jets finished the regular season in second place. In the league quarter-final, the Jets were put up against the winless Frontenac Flyers, whom they swept 3-games-to-none. In the league semi-final, the Jets drew the Campbellford Rebels. In the end, the Jets were victorious winning the series 4-games-to-1. In the league final, the Jets came up against the top seeded Napanee Raiders. After a long, hard-fought series, the Raiders won game 7 to win the series and the league championship 4-games-to-3.

In 2006-07, the Jets again finished in second place. With no quarter-final round this year, the Jets were automatically placed in the semi-final. The Jets drew the Napanee Raiders and gained some measure of revenge over them for the result of the previous years final with a 4-games-to-2 series win. In the Final, the Jets drew the Colborne Cobras, that season's top rated team. The series went the distance with the Jets coming out victorious in the end with a 4-games-to-3 series victory (The Jets rallied from a 3-games-to-0 deficit). In the provincial quarter-final, the Jets came up against the Central Ontario Junior C Hockey League's Lakefield Chiefs. The Chiefs proved to be too much as the Jets lost the series 4-games-to-2.

== Season-by-season results ==
Season	GP	W	L	T	OTL	GF	GA	P	Results	Playoffs
1989-90	30	9	18	3	-	128	165	21	4th EOJCHL	
1990-91	30	11	18	1	-	137	177	23	5th EOJCHL	
1991-92	30	17	11	2	-	163	121	36	2nd EOJCHL	Won League
1992-93	36	23	8	5	-	218	135	51	2nd EOJCHL	
1993-94	36	19	14	3	-	164	148	41	3rd EOJCHL	
1994-95	40	27	10	-	3	232	175	57	2nd EOJCHL	
1995-96	42	24	10	5	3	226	165	56	2nd EBJCHL	
1996-97	42	19	20	3	-	187	178	41	5th EBJCHL	
1997-98	36	17	17	2	-	174	160	36	3rd EBJCHL	
1998-99	36	10	21	4	1	116	152	25	5th EBJCHL	DNQ
1999-00	36	12	21	2	1	145	153	27	5th EBJCHL	DNQ
2000-01	34	11	19	3	1	129	158	26	4th EBJCHL	Lost quarter-final 0-2 (Flyers)
2001-02	36	17	17	1	1	146	162	36	5th EBJCHL	Lost quarter-final 0-2 (Rebels)
2002-03	34	20	12	1	1	147	127	42	1st EBJCHL	Lost semi-final 1-4 (Raiders)
2003-04	34	17	13	2	2	135	120	38	3rd EBJCHL	Won semi-final 4-2 (Raiders); Lost final 1-4 (Rebels)
2004-05	34	18	14	1	1	144	137	38	3rd EBJCHL	Won semi-final 4-0 (Pirates); Won League 4-0 (Rebels); Lost CSC quarter-final 0-4 (Bruins)
2005-06	34	22	8	3	1	211	126	48	2nd EBJCHL	Won quarter-final 3-0 (Flyers); Won semi-final 3-1 (Rebels); Lost final 3-4 (Raiders)
2006-07	39	29	9	1	0	234	138	59	2nd EBJCHL	Won semi-final 4-2 (Raiders); Won League 4-3 (Cobras); Lost CSC quarter-final 2-4 (Chiefs)
2007-08	40	34	5	-	1	285	137	69	1st EBJCHL	Won semi-final 4-0 (Cobras); Lost final 0-4 (Raiders)
2008-09	40	29	8	-	3	283	153	61	2nd EBJCHL	Won semi-final 4-0 (Flyers); Won League4-1 (Raiders); Won CSC quarter-final 4-2 (Bruins); Lost CSC semi-final 1-4 (Hornets)
2009-10	40	27	12	-	1	256	139	55	2nd EBJCHL	Lost semi-final 0-4 (Panthers)
2010-11	40	22	17	-	1	163	160	45	2nd EOJCHL	Lost semi-final 3-4 (Pirates)
2011-12	40	19	19	-	2	136	183	40	3rd EBJCHL	Lost semi-final 3-4 (Rebels)
2012-13	40	22	14	-	2	174	142	46	4th EBJCHL	Lost semi-final 0-4 (Pirates)
2013-14	40	21	16	-	3	145	134	45	2nd EBJCHL	Won semi-final 4-0 (Panthers); Lost final 1-4 (Pirates)
2014-15	40	21	19	0	-	158	140	42	5th EBJCHL	DNQ
2015-16	40	22	14	4	-	203	170	48	3rd of 6 EBJCHL	Lost semi-final 1-4 (Raiders)
2016-17	38	12	25	1	-	116	182	25	5th of 6 Tod Div-PJHL	DNQ
2017-18	38	18	19	1	-	184	158	37	5th of 6 Tod Div-PJHL	Won semi-final, 4-3 (Raiders); Lost final 1-4 (Panthers)
2018-19	44	23	19	2	0	174	174	48	3rd of 6 Tod Div-PJHL	Lost semi-final 4-3 (Pirates)
2019-20	44	24	16	2	2	185	127	52	3rd of 6 Tod Div-PJHL	Lost semi-final 0-4 (Pirates)
2020-21	Season Lost due to COVID-19 pandemic									
2021-22	30	24	4	1	1	151	71	52	3rd of 6 Tod Div-PJHL	Won semi-final 4-0 (Panthers); Lost final 3-4 (Raiders)
2022-23	42	26	13	3	0	166	144	55	2nd of 6 Tod Div-PJHL	quarterfinal, bye Lost semi-final 2-4 (Pirates)
2023-24	42	27	14	1	0	215	147	55	2nd of 6 Tod Div-PJHL	quarter-final, bye Lost semi-final 2-4 (Panthers)
2024-25	42	28	14	0	0	208	124	56	3rd of 8 Tod Div; 5th of 15 East Conf; 22nd of 63 - PJHL	Won quarter-final 4-0 (Panthers); Lost semi-final 2-4 (Raiders)
2025-26	42	22	17	2	1	176	147	47	4th of 7 Tod Div; 8th of 14 East Conf; 31st of 61 - PJHL	Lost quarter-final 3-4 (Pirates)

== Notable alumni ==
- Bryan Allen
- Jay McKee
