= Trenton Sting =

- City: Trenton, Ontario, Canada
- League: Ontario Junior Hockey League; Eastern Ontario Junior C Hockey League; Central Ontario Junior C Hockey League; Eastern Junior B Hockey League
- Operated: 1987-2009
- Home arena: Trenton Community Gardens
- Colours: Yellow, Black, and White
- Affiliates: Campbellford Rebels (EBJCHL)

Franchise history
- 1987-1995: Trenton Golden Hawks
- 1995-2007: Trenton Sting
- 2007-2008: Quinte West Pack
- 2008-2009: Trenton Hercs

The Trenton Sting were a Junior "A" ice hockey team from Trenton, Ontario, Canada. They were a part of the Ontario Junior Hockey League.

== History ==
In 1981, the Belleville Bobcats of the Metro Junior B Hockey League moved to Trenton. In 1987, the Bobcats moved back to Belleville, but Trenton was granted a Junior C franchise in the Central Ontario Junior C Hockey League.

In 1989, the team moved over to the Eastern Ontario Junior C Hockey League that season, in which they stayed until 1995. In 1995, the ownership of the team was granted the rights to a Junior "A" team, and renamed the Sting.

Hercs logo

To fill the void in the Junior "C" loop, the Sting created a farm team known as the Brighton Buzz. After two seasons, the Buzz became the Colborne Blackhawks. Two seasons later, the team folded.

Pack logo

The Sting were sold to a private group and changed their name to the Quinte West Pack. After the name change, the Pack played the franchises' worst season since 1996-97. On April 10, 2008, the franchise was renamed the Trenton Hercs.

Effective noon January 8, 2009, the Trenton Hercs folded for the remainder of the 2008-09 season. After 37 games, the Hercs record was 14 wins, 20 losses, and 3 overtime losses. It was confirmed shortly after that the franchise is officially defunct.

== Season-by-season results ==
Season	GP	W	L	T	OTL	GF	GA	P	Results	Playoffs
1987-88	32	5	23	4	-	131	240	14	10th COJCHL	
1988-89	40	18	12	10	-	198	188	46	6th COJCHL	
1989-90	30	18	11	1	-	175	143	37	3rd EOJCHL	
1990-91	30	16	11	3	-	165	145	35	2nd EOJCHL	
1991-92	30	13	16	1	-	120	138	27	5th EOJCHL	
1992-93	36	14	21	1	-	189	222	29	5th EOJCHL	
1993-94	36	17	15	4	-	176	156	38	5th EOJCHL	
1994-95	40	7	32	-	1	146	271	15	6th EOJCHL	
1995-96	50	23	23	4	-	243	252	50	3rd OPJHL-R	
1996-97	51	16	32	3	-	192	278	36	5th OPJHL-R	
1997-98	51	28	17	6	0	237	193	62	2nd OPJHL-R	Lost final
1998-99	51	33	13	3	2	265	184	71	2nd OPJHL-E	
1999-00	49	30	15	3	1	242	179	64	3rd OPJHL-E	
2000-01	49	29	13	4	3	210	148	65	3rd OPJHL-E	Lost semi-final
2001-02	49	32	11	5	1	207	128	70	3rd OPJHL-E	
2002-03	49	32	14	2	1	235	144	67	2nd OPJHL-E	Lost Conf. Final
2003-04	49	22	21	1	5	192	190	50	5th OPJHL-E	
2004-05	49	23	20	4	2	184	151	52	6th OPJHL-E	Lost Conf. Semi-final
2005-06	49	17	26	4	2	143	196	40	7th OPJHL-E	Lost Conf. Quarter-final
2006-07	49	17	26	2	4	169	213	40	7th OPJHL-E	Lost Conf. QF
2007-08	49	17	30	-	2	135	205	36	7th OPJHL-E	
2008-09	37	14	20	-	3	129	153	31	9th OJHL-R	Folded

=== Farm Team ===
Brighton Buzz
- City: Brighton, Ontario, Canada (1995-1997); Colborne, Ontario, Canada (1997-1999)
- League: Empire B Junior C Hockey League
- Operated: 1995-1999
- Affiliates: Trenton Sting (OPJHL)

Franchise history
- 1995-1997: Brighton Buzz
- 1997-1999: Colborne Blackhawks

When the Sting jumped from Junior C to Junior A, they formed a team in the area as a feeder, this team quickly fizzled out in four years. From 1995 until 1997 they were known as the Brighton Buzz, from 1997 until 1999 they were known as the Colborne Blackhawks. Their entire existence was in the Empire B Junior C Hockey League.

Season	GP	W	L	T	OTL	GF	GA	P	Results	Playoffs
1995-96	42	1	42	1	0	96	326	3	6th EBJCHL	
1996-97	42	0	41	1	-	113	373	1	6th EBJCHL	
1997-98	36	9	24	3	-	144	241	21	6th EBJCHL	
1998-99	20	6	14	0	0	61	128	12	6th EBJCHL	

== Notable alumni ==
- Corey Ignas - UHL (Flint Generals) (Knoxville Speed)
- Kurtis McLean - AHL (Wilkes-Barre/Scranton Penguins) NHL (Pittsburgh Penguins) (New York Islanders)
- Mat Goody - AHL (Providence Bruins) SPHL (Richmond Renegades)
- Drew MacIntyre - AHL (Manitoba Moose) (Drafted by Detroit Red Wings - 4th Rnd in 2001 NHL Entry Draft)
- Kevin Baker - AHL (Toronto Marlies) (Milwaukee Admirals) (Saint John Flames) (Lowell Lock Monsters) ECHL (Texas Wildcatters) (Drafted by Los Angeles Kings - 7th Rnd in 1999 NHL Entry Draft) OHL (Belleville Bulls)
- Anthony Tapper - OHL (Toronto St. Michael's Majors)(Mississauga St. Michael's Majors)
- Dustin Walsh - OHL (Ottawa 67's)
