= Frontenac Flyers =

- City: Verona, Ontario
- League: Empire B Junior C Hockey League
- Founded: 1989
- Folded: 2010
- Home arena: North Frontenac Community Centre
- Colours: Orange, black, and white

Franchise history
- 1989-1993: Frontenac Flyers; 1993-2004: North Frontenac Flyers; 2004-2010: Frontenac Flyers

Championships
- League champions: 1991, 2002

The Frontenac Flyers were a junior ice hockey team based in Verona, Ontario, Canada. They played in the Empire B Junior C Hockey League of the Ontario Hockey Association.

== History ==
The Frontenac Flyers were founded in 1989 as members of the Eastern Ontario Junior C Hockey League. They get their name from the county in which Verona is located, Frontenac County, Ontario.

The Flyers' first season proved to be an excellent one. In thirty regular season games, the Flyers finished in second place overall, with a record of twenty-three wins and only seven losses. In just their second season in the league, the Frontenac Flyers won their league title.

In 1993, the Frontenac Flyers renamed themselves the North Frontenac Flyers. The reason for the name change is not clear. Two seasons later, the Eastern Ontario Junior C Hockey League changed its name to the Empire B Junior C Hockey League to avoid confusion with the Ottawa District Hockey Association's Eastern Ontario Junior C Hockey League.

In 2002, the Flyers won their second ever league title. From that point on, the Flyers suffered in the Empire B league.

In 2004, the team changed their name back to just the "Frontenac Flyers".

The 2005–06 season proved to be a low point in the Flyers' history. The team finished the regular season in dead-last place and posted a winless record of no wins, 34 losses, and no ties. This marked the worst season in team history, just two years after their 2004 league championship. Due to the rules of the season, the Flyers still made the playoffs. In the league quarter-final, they drew the Amherstview Jets, who squashed them 3-0.

The 2006–07 season showed minor improvement, but the Flyers still finished in last place. They rebuilt the club with 15 rookies and added new staff to the front office. With only three wins in the season, the Flyers failed to make the league playoffs. As of 2007, the team had yet to win the regular season top seed, but had won two playoff championships.

In July 2010, the Flyers executives folded the club.

== Season-by-season results ==
| Season | GP | W | L | T | OTL | GF | GA | P | Results | Playoffs |
| 1989-90 | 30 | 23 | 7 | 0 | - | 230 | 138 | 46 | 2nd EOJCHL | |
| 1990-91 | 30 | 16 | 11 | 3 | - | 195 | 170 | 35 | 3rd EOJCHL | Won League |
| 1991-92 | 30 | 13 | 12 | 5 | - | 142 | 116 | 31 | 3rd EOJCHL | |
| 1992-93 | 36 | 11 | 20 | 5 | - | 182 | 204 | 27 | 6th EOJCHL | |
| 1993-94 | 36 | 12 | 20 | 4 | - | 145 | 148 | 28 | 6th EOJCHL | |
| 1994-95 | 40 | 13 | 27 | - | 0 | 151 | 254 | 26 | 5th EOJCHL | |
| 1995-96 | 42 | 22 | 16 | 2 | 2 | 216 | 186 | 48 | 5th EBJCHL | |
| 1996-97 | 42 | 24 | 13 | 5 | - | 219 | 182 | 53 | 3rd EBJCHL | |
| 1997-98 | 36 | 12 | 21 | 3 | - | 136 | 167 | 27 | 5th EBJCHL | |
| 1998-99 | 36 | 13 | 22 | 0 | 1 | 146 | 184 | 27 | 4th EBJCHL | |
| 1999-00 | 36 | 14 | 19 | 2 | 1 | 137 | 180 | 31 | 4th EBJCHL | |
| 2000-01 | 34 | 11 | 19 | 2 | 2 | 116 | 148 | 26 | 5th EBJCHL | |
| 2001-02 | 36 | 19 | 13 | 1 | 3 | 181 | 157 | 42 | 2nd EBJCHL | Won League |
| 2002-03 | 34 | 10 | 22 | 0 | 2 | 131 | 193 | 22 | 4th EBJCHL | |
| 2003-04 | 34 | 5 | 27 | 2 | 0 | 112 | 207 | 12 | 5th EBJCHL | |
| 2004-05 | 34 | 4 | 27 | 1 | 2 | 82 | 208 | 11 | 5th EBJCHL | |
| 2005-06 | 34 | 0 | 34 | 0 | 0 | 64 | 346 | 0 | 6th EBJCHL | Lost quarter-final |
| 2006-07 | 40 | 3 | 36 | 1 | 0 | 141 | 289 | 7 | 6th EBJCHL | DNQ |
| 2007-08 | 40 | 4 | 32 | - | 4 | 145 | 324 | 12 | 6th EBJCHL | |
| 2008-09 | 40 | 19 | 21 | - | 0 | 126 | 165 | 38 | 3rd EBJCHL | |
| 2009-10 | 40 | 0 | 40 | - | 0 | 66 | 388 | 0 | 6th EBJCHL | DNQ |
