= Trent Hills Thunder =

Canadian junior ice hockey team

- City: campbellford, Ontario
- League: Provincial Junior Hockey League
- Division: Tod (East Conf)
- Founded: 1992
- Home arena: Sunny Life Wellness Centre
- Colours: Lime, Grey, and Black
- General manager: Bryce Ellis (2024)
- Head coach: Doug Mathew (2025)

Franchise history
- 1980–86: Campbellford Merchants; 1986-1992: hiatus 1992-2024: Campbellford Rebels; 2024-current: Trent Hills Thunder

Championships
- League champions: 1997, 1998, 2000, 2003, 2004, 2012

logo of the trent hills thunder

The Trent Hills Thunder is the 2024 re-branding of the Campbellford Rebels a Canadian Junior ice hockey team based in Campbellford, Ontario, Canada. They play in the Tod Division of the Provincial Junior Hockey League, and were formerly members of the Empire B Junior C Hockey League of the Ontario Hockey Association.

== History ==
Campbellford's junior hockey history began in 1980. The Campbellford Merchants joined the Quinte-St. Lawrence Junior C Hockey League.

In 1986, the Quinte-St. Lawrence league was falling apart and merged with the more western Central Ontario Junior C Hockey League. The Merchants and most of the other local teams, like the Frankford Huskies, were forced into hiatus.

In 1989, The Eastern Ontario Junior C Hockey League was formed in the same region as the Quinte-St. Lawrence League. In 1992, the Campbellford Rebels were formed to compete in the new league. The first goal in Rebels history was scored by Marc Emmons on October 7, 1992. In 1995, the Eastern Ontario Junior C Hockey League became the Empire B Junior C Hockey League to stifle confusion between the league and the neighbouring Ottawa District Hockey Association's Eastern Ontario Junior C Hockey League.

Success for the Rebels began in 1996. The Rebels won the 1997, 1998, and 2000 league championships. After disappointment in 2001 and 2002, the Rebels were again victorious in 2003 and 2004. With five league championships in eight years, the Rebels have yet to win the Clarence Schmalz Cup as All-Ontario Champions.

The Rebels finished third overall in the 2005-06 regular season. Because of a new divisionary system in the league, despite finishing the season with a losing record, the Rebels finished first in their division and received a bye to the league semi-final. In the semi-final, the Rebels drew the Amherstview Jets who beat Campbellford 4-games-to-1.

The Rebels ended up in fourth place in the 2006-07 final standings. Barely sneaking in on the final playoff spot, the Rebels came up against the top seeded Colborne Cobras who polished off Campbellford 4-games-to-none to move on to the league final.

Campbellford had a great 2011-12 season and ended up in the league final vs the defending champions Picton Pirates. The Rebels upset the Pirates to win the Empire B Championship. In the provincials they advanced for the first time past the QF defeating the Clarington Eagles of the Central Ontario League in seven games. Then the Rebels surprised everyone by winning the first three games of their SF vs the powerful Alliston Hornets of the Georgian Bay Mid Ontario League. The Hornets sting came out in game 4 and the Rebels epi pen couldn't save them after that. Alliston came back to win the series in 7 games.

The playoffs for the 2019-20 season were cancelled due to the COVID-19 pandemic, leading to the team not being able to play a single game.

== Season-by-season results ==
Season	GP	W	L	T	OTL	GF	GA	P	Results	Playoffs
1992-93	34	5	28	1	-	131	278	11	7th EOJCHL	
1993-94	36	18	14	4	-	188	175	40	4th EOJCHL	
1994-95	40	21	15	-	4	203	193	46	4th EOJCHL	
1995-96	42	24	15	1	2	229	191	51	3rd EBJCHL	
1996-97	42	22	20	0	-	270	223	44	4th EBJCHL	Won League; Lost CSC quarter-final (Chiefs)
1997-98	36	25	11	0	-	189	149	50	2nd EBJCHL	Won League; Lost CSC quarter-final (Chiefs)
1998-99	36	30	4	2	0	200	102	62	1st EBJCHL	Won semi-final 4-0 (Flyers); Lost final 3-4 (Pirates)
1999-00	36	15	19	1	1	150	163	32	3rd EBJCHL	Won semi-final 4-3 (Raiders); Won League 4-3 (Pirates); Lost CSC quarter-final 0-4 (Chiefs)
2000-01	34	19	10	4	1	151	135	43	2nd EBJCHL	Won semi-final 4-0 (Pirates); Lost final 3-4 (Raiders)
2001-02	36	18	15	2	1	155	169	39	4th EBJCHL	Won quarter-final 2-0 (Jets); Lost semi-final 2-4 (Raiders)
2002-03	34	20	12	0	2	160	141	42	2nd EBJCHL	Won semi-final 4-0 (Pirates); Won League 4-0 (Raiders); Lost CSC quarter-final 1-4 (Ice)
2003-04	34	23	10	1	0	175	136	47	1st EBJCHL	Won semi-final 4-2 (Pirates); Won League 4-1 (Jets); Lost CSC quarter-final 2-4 (Chiefs)
2004-05	34	16	15	1	2	159	143	35	4th EBJCHL	Won semi-final 4-2 (Raiders); Lost final 0-4 (Jets)
2005-06	34	15	18	0	1	155	172	31	3rd EBJCHL	Lost semi-final 1-3 (Jets)
2006-07	40	17	22	1	0	170	190	35	4th EBJCHL	Lost semi-final 0-4 (Cobras)
2007-08	40	23	16	-	1	206	160	47	3rd EBJCHL	Lost semi-final 0-4 (Raiders)
2008-09	40	11	25	-	4	144	237	26	5th EBJCHL	DNQ
2009-10	40	18	19	-	3	195	189	39	5th EBJCHL	DNQ
2010-11	40	19	19	-	2	148	155	40	4th EBJCHL	Lost quarter-final 2-3 (Panthers)
2011-12	40	26	13	-	1	181	146	53	2nd EBJCHL	Won semi-final 4-3 (Jets); Won League 4-1 (Pirates); Won CSC quarter-final 4-3 (Eagles); Lost CSC semi-final 4-3 (Hornets)
2012-13	40	24	13	-	3	192	138	51	3rd EBJCHL	Lost semi-final 1-4 (Panthers)
2013-14	40	20	16	-	4	167	125	44	4th EBJCHL	Lost semi-final 2-4 (Pirates)
2014-15	40	22	17	1	-	151	147	45	3rd EBJCHL	Lost semi-final 1-4 (Raiders)
2015-16	40	9	30	1	-	107	225	19	3rd EBJCHL	DNQ
2016-17	38	0	37	1	-	52	275	1	6th of 6 Tod Div-PJHL	DNQ
2017-18	39	1	38	0	-	62	396	2	6th of 6 Tod Div-PJHL	DNQ
2018-19	44	1	41	1	1	83	375	4	6th of 6 Tod Div-PJHL	DNQ
2019-20	44	1	41	0	2	81	343	4	6th of 6 Tod Div-PJHL	DNQ
2020-21	Season Lost due to COVID-19 pandemic									
2021-22	30	8	21	0	1	83	156	17	5th of 6 Tod Div-PJHL	Lost quarter-final 1-4 (Panthers}
2022-23	41	3	35	2	1	91	235	9	6th of 6 Tod Div-PJHL	Lost quarter-final 0-4 (Pirates}
2023-24	42	0	40	1	1	61	313	5	6th of 6 Tod Div-PJHL	Lost quarter-final 0-4 (Panthers)
Trent Hills Thunder
2024-25	42	7	33	2	0	83	246	16	7th of 8 Tod Div; 13th of 15 East Conf; 57th of 63-PJHL	Lost quarter-final 0-4 (Raiders)
2025-26	42	7	31	3	1	99	235	17	7th of 7 Tod Div; 13th of 14 East Conf; 57th of 63-PJHL	Lost quarter-final 0-4 (Huskies)
