= Strathcona Paper Centre =

Sports and entertainment facility in Napanee, Ontario, Canada

Coordinates: 44.25980°N 76.97274°W

The Strathcona Paper Centre (SPC) is a sports and entertainment facility located on 16 McPherson Drive in Napanee, Ontario, Canada. The facility hosts national and provincial ice hockey championships, curling, concerts and trade fairs. The SPC is the home arena of the Napanee Raiders, a Junior ice hockey team.

On March 15, 2021, Napanee's first public COVID-19 vaccination clinic opened in the Strathcona Paper Centre.
