= Frankford Huskies =

- City: Frankford, Ontario
- League: Provincial Junior Hockey League
- Operated: 2004-2009 (senior); 2021- (junior)
- Home arena: Frankford Arena
- Colours: Black, Yellow, White
- General manager: Ian Green
- Head coach: Matt Goody (2025)

Franchise history
- 2004-2008: Frankford Huskies
- 2008-2009: Baltimore Clippers
- 2021-present: Frankford Huskies

The Frankford Huskies are a Canadian Junior C ice hockey team based in Frankford, Ontario, Canada. They play in the Provincial Junior Hockey League.

== History ==
The Frankford Huskies joined the Eastern Ontario Senior Hockey League in 2004. They were named after their old junior hockey club that played in the Quinte-St. Lawrence Junior C Hockey League for many years. The relocated Baltimore Clippers were named after the long time American Hockey League team previously located in Baltimore, Maryland.

After four years in the EOSHL, the remaining four EOSHL teams merged with the two remaining Western senior teams to form the new Ontario Major Hockey "AAA" League to be known as Major League Hockey. In 2008, the Baltimore Clippers will begin their first season in the MLH with the Whitby Dunlops, the Norwood Vipers, the Coldwater Tundras, the Brantford Blast and the Dundas Real McCoys. In the summer of 2009, the Clippers left Major League Hockey.

== Junior C History ==
The Frankford Huskies are a Junior C team based out of the Frankford Arena in Frankford, Ontario playing in the Provincial Junior Hockey League (OHA). The team started play with the 2021-22 season. They are part of the East Conference and the Tod Division.

The franchise was formed out of the sale of the Kitchener Dutchmen and the elevation of the Ayr Centennials to Junior B. The PJHL franchise rights were used to form the Frankford Huskies franchise.

== Season-by-season record ==
Note: GP = Games played, W = Wins, L = Losses, T = Ties, OTL = Overtime losses, Pts = Points, GF = Goals for, GA = Goals against

Season	GP	W	L	T	OTL	GF	GA	P	Results	
2004-05	32	5	25	-	2	--	--	12	7th EOSHL	
2005-06	30	5	24	-	1	100	236	11	5th EOSHL	
2006-07	27	14	11	-	2	169	160	30	2nd EOSHL	
2007-08	28	15	11	-	2	149	150	32	3rd EOSHL	
2008-09	28	15	12	-	1	141	153	31	4th MLH	
Frankford Huskies
2021-22	30	1	27	0	2	45	170	4	6th of 6-PJHL; Tod Div	Lost semi-final 1-4 (Picton)
2022-23	42	15	24	3	0	152	189	33	5th of 6-PJHL; Tod Div	Lost semi-final 1-4 (Panthers)
2023-24	42	30	8	4	0	219	116	64	1st of 6-PJHL; Tod Div	quarter-final - bye Lost semi-final 2-4 (Raiders)
2024-25	42	34	8	0	0	225	95	68	1st of 8 Tod Div; 3rd of 15 East Conf; 9th of 63 - PJHL	Won quarter-final 4-0 (Knights); Won semi-final 4-3 (Chiefs); Lost final 2-4 (Raiders)
2025-26	42	30	11	0	1	175	114	61	2nd of 7 Tod Div; 2nd of 14 East Conf; 14th of 61 - PJHL	Won quarter-final 4-0 (Thunder); Won semi-final 4-0 (Raiders); Won East final 4-2 (Bruins); Lost League Semifinals 1-4 (Whalers}
