= Hockey Eastern Ontario =

Canadian ice hockey governing body

- Sport: Ice Hockey
- Jurisdiction: Eastern Ontario
- Abbreviation: HEO
- Founded: December 24, 1920
- Headquarters: Ottawa, Ontario
- Replaced: Central Canada Hockey Association (CCHA)
- (founded): November 20, 1916

Official website
- hockeyeasternontario.ca

Hockey Eastern Ontario (HEO), formerly the Ottawa District Hockey Association (ODHA) and the Ottawa and District Amateur Hockey Association (ODAHA), is the governing body of a variety of ice hockey Junior leagues and a minor hockey system based out of the Greater Ottawa area and Southwestern Quebec. It is one of thirteen regional branches of Hockey Canada. The ODHA became HEO in the Summer of 2013.

== History ==
The roots of Hockey Eastern Ontario date back to the 1890s. In 1890, the Ontario Hockey Association was organized and a senior league was formed. At the same time, the Ottawa City Hockey League was organized. In 1894, the Ottawa Hockey Association, owners of the senior Ottawa Hockey Club and organizer of the OCHL resigned from the OHA over a dispute over the Cosby Cup. Several organizations came and went over the next twenty years, such as the Eastern Ontario Hockey Association, and the Central Canada Hockey Association for teams in Eastern Ontario. Teams also played in leagues with Quebec teams. In 1920, the Ottawa and Valley branch of the Amateur Athletic Union of Canada was formed. It eventually became the Ottawa District Hockey Association with the Canadian Amateur Hockey Association.

== Jurisdiction ==
Under the jurisdiction of Hockey Canada, Hockey Eastern Ontario controls all senior and junior hockey in the part of Ontario east of and including Lanark County, Renfrew County, and Leeds County, but not including the town of Gananoque which is under the jurisdiction of the Ontario Hockey Association.

== Leagues ==
- Central Canada Hockey League
- Eastern Ontario Junior Hockey League
- National Capital Junior Hockey League
- HEO Minor Hockey League

== Notable people ==
- Bill Beagan, ice hockey referee and later commissioner of four different leagues
- Cecil Duncan, ODHA executive board member for 51 years, Canadian Amateur Hockey Association president and Ligue Internationale de Hockey sur Glace vice-president
- W. B. George, ODHA executive board member for 25 years, Canadian Amateur Hockey Association president
- Silver Quilty, founding member of the ODHA and president of the Canadian Amateur Hockey Association

== See also ==
- List of ice hockey teams in Ontario
- List of ice hockey leagues
- Canadian Junior A Hockey League
