= Jeff Zehr =

Canadian professional ice hockey winger (born 1978)

- Born: December 10, 1978 (age 47) Woodstock, Ontario, Canada
- Height: 6 ft 3 in (191 cm)
- Weight: 195 lb (88 kg; 13 st 13 lb)
- Position: Left wing
- Shot: Left
- Played for: Boston Bruins
- NHL draft: 31st overall, 1997; New York Islanders
- Playing career: 1999–2009

Jeff Zehr (born December 10, 1978) is a Canadian professional ice hockey winger who last played for the Flint Generals of the International Hockey League. Zehr was drafted 31st overall by the New York Islanders in the 1997 NHL entry draft. He signed with the Boston Bruins as a free agent in 1999, but missed most of 1999–2000 season after suffering a knee injury during practice and only managed to play four games in all for Boston. He moved to the ECHL afterwards, suiting up for five different teams during a four-year spell. He later purchased the London Lakers, later relocating them to Plattsville, Ontario, which has since become the Woodstock Lakers.

== Career statistics ==
=== Regular season and playoffs ===
			Regular season					Playoffs
Season	Team	League	GP	G	A	Pts	PIM	GP	G	A	Pts	PIM
1993–94	Tavistock Braves	SOJHL	6	2	1	3	6	—	—	—	—	—
1994–95	Stratford Cullitons	MWJHL	44	26	32	58	143	—	—	—	—	—
1995–96	Windsor Spitfires	OHL	56	4	21	25	103	7	0	1	1	2
1996–97	Windsor Spitfires	OHL	57	27	32	59	196	5	2	1	3	4
1997–98	Windsor Spitfires	OHL	20	12	18	30	67	—	—	—	—	—
1997–98	Erie Otters	OHL	32	15	24	39	91	5	0	3	3	24
1998–99	Erie Otters	OHL	28	20	23	43	78	—	—	—	—	—
1998–99	Sarnia Sting	OHL	14	4	10	14	43	6	3	4	7	27
1999–00	Providence Bruins	AHL	12	3	3	6	37	—	—	—	—	—
1999–00	Boston Bruins	NHL	4	0	0	0	2	—	—	—	—	—
2000–01	Greenville Grrrowl	ECHL	23	2	1	3	76	—	—	—	—	—
2001–02	Cincinnati Cyclones	ECHL	16	3	5	8	53	—	—	—	—	—
2001–02	Greensboro Generals	ECHL	39	17	16	33	222	—	—	—	—	—
2002–03	Columbus Cottonmouths	ECHL	58	23	35	58	229	—	—	—	—	—
2003–04	Peoria Rivermen	ECHL	9	2	0	2	57	—	—	—	—	—
2003–04	Greenville Grrrowl	ECHL	32	4	21	25	118	—	—	—	—	—
2003–04	Johnstown Chiefs	ECHL	22	7	14	21	72	1	0	1	1	0
2004–05	Aylmer Blues	OHA-Sr.	30	14	41	55	69	—	—	—	—	—
2006–07	Flint Generals	UHL	64	30	35	65	93	5	1	1	2	19
2007–08	Port Huron Icehawks	IHL	71	33	33	66	128	11	7	1	8	39
2008–09	Port Huron Icehawks	IHL	49	16	27	43	86	—	—	—	—	—
2008–09	Flint Generals	IHL	22	5	12	17	89	—	—	—	—	—
ECHL totals			199	58	92	150	827	1	0	1	1	0
NHL totals			4	0	0	0	2	—	—	—	—	—
