= Delhi Travellers =

Canadian junior ice hockey team

- City: Delhi, Ontario
- League: Provincial Junior Hockey League
- Division: Central / Pat Doherty
- Founded: Circa 1960
- Folded: 2020
- Home arena: Delhi Community Arena
- Colours: Blue, Silver, and White
- General manager: Chris Longthorne (2016-17)
- Head coach: Rob Hutchison (2016-17)

Franchise history
- Circa 1960–72: Delhi Rockets; 1972–91: Delhi Flames; 1991–98: Delhi Leafs; 1998–2020: Delhi Travellers

Championships
- League champions: 1981, 1986
- OHA Cups: None

The Delhi Travellers were a junior hockey team based in Delhi, Ontario, Canada. The Travellers play in the Provincial Junior Hockey League of the Ontario Hockey Association.

== History ==
Prior to 1966, the Delhi franchise was a member of the Shamrock Junior D Hockey League. In 1966, they jumped to the Southern Counties Junior D Hockey League. In 1972, the team changed their name from the Rockets to the Flames.

The 1980–81 season saw the Flames raise to the heights of provincial recognition. They finished second overall in the Southern league standings with 21 wins, seven losses, and six ties, a fair distance behind the first place St. George Dukes. Once in the playoffs, the Flames took the Southern league by storm and won their first ever league championship. The victory launched the Flames into the provincial final in competition for the OHA Cup. Their opponents were the Belmont Bombers, the champions of the Western Junior D Hockey League. The Bombers made quick work of the Flames, sweeping the series 4-games-to-none.

In the 1986 playoffs, the Flames once again took the Southern league crown. The victory brought them into line for another crack at the OHA Cup. Once in the provincial final, they found them against the Western league champions Seaforth Centenaires. The Centenaires were battle-hardened from their play in the North Division of the 12-team Western league and kept the Flames at bay for a 4-games-to-1 series victory.

In 1988, Delhi's Southern league folded and merged with the Western league to create a province-wide 18-team super-league. In 1991, the Western league was dropped in favour of the OHA Junior Development League.

From their point of entry into the Western league in 1988, the Delhi Flames found themselves in vast trouble. In 1991, the team changed their names to the Delhi Leafs to honour the towns former Intermediate league representative. The Leafs suffered horrible losing season from 1991 all the way until they opted to change their team name to the Delhi Travellers in 1998. After one season under the Travellers moniker, and one of their worst seasons in franchise history, the team took a leave of absence from the OHAJDL.

In 2000–01, the Travellers were back and finished in thirteenth place overall in the OHAJDL. This marked their best finish since entering the league in 1988. A year later they had a winning record. In fact, as of 2007, every season from 2000-on the Travellers at least matched their previous seasons performance if not bettered it.

After the 2005–06 season, the Travellers found themselves in second place overall in the OHAJDL with 29 wins. In the opening round of the playoffs, the Travellers challenged and defeated the Burford Bulldogs 4-games-to-2. In the conference semi-final, the Travellers then met the Hagersville Hawks and beat them 4-games-to-3. Then Delhi challenged the Tavistock Braves and swept them 4-games-to-none to win their first ever birth into the league final since joining the league eighteen years before. They met the underdog Lucan Irish, a seventh seed berth from the other conference who defied all odds to make it this far. The Irish were not to be denied of the Cinderella story, as they defeated the Travellers 4-games-to-2 to win the OHA Cup.

After 2006, the OHAJDL was disbanded and replaced by the Southern Ontario Junior Hockey League. In its first season, the Travellers finished in second place despite winning 32 games—three more than the previous season. In the first round of the playoffs, the Travellers challenged the Port Dover Sailors. The Travellers had no problem with the Sailors and swept them 4-games-to-none. The next round had Delhi faced off against the St. George Dukes. The longtime rivals went to six games with Delhi win the series 4-games-to-2. The next round had the Travellers trying for their second straight conference title against the Tavistock Braves. The series went the distance and the Travellers came out on top in Game 7 winning the series 4-games-to-3. In their second straight final, the Travellers met a tough foe in the Mitchell Hawks. The Hawks and Travellers fought, but the Hawks won Game 6 and took the series 4-games-to-2 to take away Delhi's second straight chance at the OHA Cup.

In the Summer of 2013, after much uncertainty, the Travellers ended up in the new Midwestern Junior C Hockey League. In 2014–15, the team finished an Imperfect Season, losing all 40 games played.

For the 2016–17 season the eight Junior "C" hockey leagues in Southern Ontario amalgamated into one league, the Provincial Junior Hockey League. The Midwestern League were placed in the Central Conference and re-branded the Pat Doherty division.

The playoffs for the 2019–20 season were cancelled due to the COVID-19 pandemic, leading to the team not being able to play a single game.

== Season-by-season record ==
Season	GP	W	L	T	OTL	GF	GA	P	Results	Playoffs
1966-67	24	16	8	0	-	118	95	32	1st SCJDHL	
1967-68	24	17	7	0	-	147	104	34	2nd SCJDHL	
1968-69	30	20	9	1	-	196	132	41	2nd SCJDHL	
1969-70	30	15	12	3	-	156	146	33	3rd SCJDHL	
1970-71	30	13	17	0	-	146	155	26	5th SCJDHL	
1971-72	28	11	15	2	-	122	133	24	6th SCJDHL	
1972-73	30	17	13	0	-	133	122	34	4th SCJDHL	
1973-74	29	16	13	0	-	164	156	32	3rd SCJDHL	
1974-75	30	17	13	0	-	190	172	34	2nd SCJDHL	
1975-76	35	23	9	3	-	--	--	49	2nd SCJDHL	
1976-77	28	9	18	1	-	--	--	19	8th SCJDHL	
1977-78	34	4	29	1	-	129	261	9	8th SJDHL	
1978-79	32	14	18	0	-	158	187	28	5th SJDHL	
1979-80	32	14	16	2	-	160	169	30	6th SJDHL	
1980-81	34	21	7	6	-	213	115	48	2nd SJDHL	
1981-82	36	20	14	2	-	--	--	42	4th SJDHL	
1982-83	36	16	15	5	-	--	--	37	4th SJDHL	
1983-84	36	22	11	3	-	--	--	47	2nd SJDHL	
1984-85	35	17	14	4	-	--	--	38	2nd SJDHL	
1985-86	32	21	6	5	-	--	--	47	1st SJDHL	
1986-87	40	14	20	6	-	--	--	34	5th SJDHL	
1987-88	31	12	16	3	-	--	--	27	4th SJDHL	
1988-89	35	6	22	7	-	137	246	19	17th WJDHL	
1989-90	35	5	27	3	-	165	255	13	17th WJDHL	
1990-91	40	9	30	1	0	156	248	19	18th WJDHL	
1991-92	33	1	31	1	0	117	296	3	17th OHAJDL	
1992-93	40	10	26	1	3	130	239	24	16th OHAJDL	
1993-94	40	5	33	2	-	112	283	12	17th OHAJDL	
1994-95	39	5	31	2	1	122	270	13	18th OHAJDL	
1995-96	40	14	25	1	0	168	229	29	16th OHAJDL	
1996-97	39	13	22	2	2	163	216	30	14th OHAJDL	
1997-98	37	14	19	3	1	160	192	32	14th OHAJDL	
1998-99	38	5	29	1	3	86	207	14	18th OHAJDL	
1999-00	Did Not Participate									
2000-01	40	13	25	0	2	--	--	28	13th OHAJDL	
2001-02	40	19	17	1	3	148	147	42	10th OHAJDL	
2002-03	40	18	17	1	4	156	175	41	11th OHAJDL	
2003-04	40	18	12	7	3	161	146	46	5th OHAJDL	
2004-05	40	27	11	0	2	163	114	56	3rd OHAJDL	
2005-06	38	29	6	3	0	176	92	61	2nd OHAJDL	
2006-07	42	32	9	0	1	198	120	65	2nd SOJHL	
2007-08	42	30	6	-	6	183	126	66	2nd SOJHL	
2008-09	40	31	6	-	3	202	122	65	2nd SOJHL	
2009-10	36	28	6	-	2	214	119	58	2nd SOJHL	
2010-11	35	20	14	-	1	155	136	41	8th SOJHL	
2011-12	35	26	8	-	1	180	136	53	2nd SOJHL	
Southern Ontario Junior Hockey League - Jr "C"
2012-13	38	17	19	-	2	167	183	36	6th SOJHL-Mc	
2013-14	39	6	31	-	2	106	194	14	8th MWJCHL	Lost Quarters - 1-4 - (Mounties)
2014-15	40	0	40	0	-	52	273	0	9th MWJCHL	DNQ
2015-16	40	4	35	1	-	92	225	9	9th of 9 MWJCHL	DNQ
2016-17	40	1	39	0	-	71	304	2	9th of 9-PJHL; Doughery Div	DNQ
2017-18	40	1	39	0	-	55	274	2	9th of 9-PJHL; Doughery Div	DNQ
2018-19	40	4	36	0	-	52	298	8	8th of 9-PJHL; Doughery Div	Lost Quarters, 0-4 - (Braves)
2019-20	40	0	40	0	-	47	532	0	9th of 9-PJHL; Doughery Div	did not Qualify
2020-21	Season Lost due to COVID-19 pandemic									
2021-22	Requested leave of absence 2020–21 season Did not return for current season									

=== Playoffs ===
- 1981 Won league, Lost OHA final

Belmont Bombers defeated Delhi Flames 4-games-to-none in OHA final

- 1986 Won league, Lost OHA final

Seaforth Centenaires defeated Delhi Flames 4-games-to-1 in OHA final

- 2006 Lost final

Delhi Travellers defeated Burford Bulldogs 4-games-to-2 in conf. quarter-final
Delhi Travellers defeated Hagersville Hawks 4-games-to-3 in conf. semi-final
Delhi Travellers defeated Tavistock Braves 4-games-to-none in conf. final
Lucan Irish defeated Delhi Travellers 4-games-to-2 in final

- 2007 Lost final

Delhi Travellers defeated Port Dover Sailors 4-games-to-none in conf. quarter-final
Delhi Travellers defeated St. George Dukes 4-games-to-2 in conf. semi-final
Delhi Travellers defeated Tavistock Braves 4-games-to-3 in conf. final
Mitchell Hawks defeated Delhi Travellers 4-games-to-2 in final

- 2009 Lost final

Delhi Travellers defeated Burford Bulldogs 4-games-to-none in conf. semi final
Delhi Travellers defeated Hagersville Hawks 4-games-to-none in conf. final
Delhi Travellers competed against North Middlesex Stars and Thamesford Trojans in semi-final round robin
Delhi Travellers advanced to finals against North Middlesex Stars
North Middlesex Stars defeated Delhi Travellers 4-games-to-3 in final

- 2010 Lost semi-final

Delhi Travellers defeated St. George Dukes 4-games-to-1 in conf. semi final
Delhi Travellers defeated Hagersville Hawks 4-games-to-1 in conf. final
Exeter Hawks and Thamesford Trojans defeated Delhi Travellers in semi-final round robin

== Notable alumni ==
- Ryan Vandenbussche
