= Port Stanley Sailors =

Canadian junior ice hockey team

- City: Port Stanley, Ontario
- League: Provincial Junior Hockey League
- Division: Yeck Division
- Founded: 1969
- Home arena: Port Stanley Arena & Community Centre
- Colours: Red, Black, White
- Owners: Dale Howard, Harold Lang
- President: Doug Eaton
- General manager: Scott Nugent
- Head coach: Scott Nugent

Franchise history
- 1969–75: Belmont Sunsets; 1975–86: Belmont Bombers; 1986–88: Belmont Pests; 1988–2006: Belmont Bombers; 2006–08: Central Elgin Express; 2009–present: Port Stanley Sailors

Championships
- League champions: 1974, 1975, 1976, 1980, 1981
- OHA Cups: 1975, 1980, 1981

The Port Stanley Sailors are a Canadian Junior ice hockey team based in Port Stanley, Ontario. They play in the Provincial Junior Hockey League.

== History ==
The Sailors were formerly known as the Belmont Bombers, playing their last season as the Bombers in 05–06. Prior to the 06–07 season, they changed their name to the Central Elgin Express. This was done as the team was going to be splitting their home games between Belmont and Port Stanley. During the 07–08 season, the Express played all their home games in Port Stanley, which was formerly home to the Port Stanley Lakers, which became the West Lorne Lakers before leaving the OHA.

During the summer of 2008, it was announced that The Central Elgin Express had been sold by Peter North and Bill Walters to a group of four equal owners led by St. Thomas resident Dale J. Howard. The other three owners are Harold Lang, Matt Stolk and Mike Carson. The Sailors were not able to play in 08-09 because the OHA schedule had already been finalized. So the Sailors began play in 09–10.

The Express were affiliated with the St Thomas Stars of the Jr B Greater Ontario Hockey League from the 07–08 to the 09–10 seasons.

The majority of playoffs for the 2019'20 season were cancelled due to the COVID-19 pandemic. The Sailors were swept in the first round.

== Season-by-season standings ==
Season	GP	W	L	T	OTL	GF	GA	P	Results	Playoffs
1969-70	30	16	10	4	-	161	125	38	2nd WJDHL	
1970-71	34	16	16	2	-	159	167	34	5th WJDHL	
1971-72	30	19	9	2	-	156	123	40	2nd WJDHL	
1972-73	32	18	12	2	-	156	110	38	3rd WJDHL	
1973-74	33	26	5	2	-	230	111	54	1st WJDHL	
1974-75	32	28	2	2	-	262	93	58	1st WJDHL	
1975-76	27	19	3	5	-	153	90	43	1st WJDHL	
1976-77	30	15	10	5	-	146	113	35	4th WJDHL	
1977-78	34	21	7	6	-	235	156	48	4th WJDHL	
1978-79	33	22	8	3	-	208	131	47	2nd WJDHL	
1979-80	34	33	1	0	-	292	85	66	1st WJDHL	
1980-81	33	32	1	0	-	314	103	64	1st WJDHL	
1981-82	36	21	10	5	-	218	157	47	4th WJDHL	
1982-83	36	20	10	6	-	169	129	46	2nd WJDHL	
1983-84	34	15	14	5	-	219	208	35	4th WJDHL	
1984-85	34	26	6	2	-	265	137	54	1st WJDHL	
1985-86	42	28	11	3	-	269	163	59	3rd WJDHL	
1986-87	42	25	13	4	-	241	179	54	2nd WJDHL	
1987-88	40	21	17	2	-	204	208	44	5th WJDHL	
1988-89	35	22	11	2	-	197	150	46	5th WJDHL	
1989-90	35	25	8	2	-	173	101	52	2nd WJDHL	
1990-91	40	18	17	4	1	162	160	41	9th WJDHL	
1991-92	40	12	23	1	4	161	207	29	14th OHAJDL	
1992-93	40	10	26	2	2	163	255	24	15th OHAJDL	
1993-94	40	5	35	0	-	127	302	10	18th OHAJDL	
1994-95	40	18	19	1	2	193	196	39	13th OHAJDL	
1995-96	38	12	25	0	1	142	193	25	17th OHAJDL	
1996-97	39	11	26	1	1	130	216	24	17th OHAJDL	
1997-98	40	18	17	4	1	146	148	41	11th OHAJDL	
1998-99	40	24	11	3	2	163	137	53	3rd OHAJDL	
1999-00	40	10	27	1	2	145	232	23	16th OHAJDL	DNQ
2000-01	40	9	28	3	0	--	--	21	17th OHAJDL	DNQ
2001-02	40	7	30	1	2	157	246	17	18th OHAJDL	DNQ
2002-03	40	14	22	3	1	164	198	32	15th OHAJDL	Lost Div. semi-final 0-4 (Irish)
2003-04	40	7	26	3	4	157	240	21	17th OHAJDL	DNQ
2004-05	36	6	26	2	2	101	197	16	17th OHAJDL	DNQ
2005-06	37	1	36	0	0	71	283	2	18th OHAJDL	DNQ
2006-07	40	14	23	0	3	150	210	31	13th SOJHL	Lost Conference quarter-final 0-4 (Hawks)
2007-08	40	4	34	-	2	101	242	10	17th SOJHL	DNQ
2008-09	Did Not Participate									
2009-10	36	17	14	-	5	163	155	39	7th SOJHL	Lost quarter-final 3-4 (Trojans)
2010-11	36	17	15	-	4	142	137	38	11th SOJHL	Lost quarter- finals 3-4 (Stars)
2011-12	36	7	25	-	4	117	204	18	14th SOJHL	DNQ
Southern Ontario Junior Hockey League - Jr "C"
2012-13	37	22	13	-	2	164	141	46	3rd SOJHL-Yk	Won First Round 4-3 (Irish); Lost quarter-finals 0-4 (Dolphins)
2013-14	40	25	13	-	2	174	131	52	4th SOJHL	Won quarter-finals 4-3 (Irish); Lost semi-final 0-4 (Lancers)
2014-15	40	14	22	-	4	162	238	32	7th SOJHL	Lost quarter-finals 0-4 (Bulldogs)
2015-16	40	11	28	1	-	172	234	23	7th of 9 SOJHL	Lost quarter-finals 0-4 (Hawks)
2016-17	40	18	22	0	-	157	189	36	6th of 9 Yeck Div - PJHL	Lost Div Quarters 0-4 (Spitfires)
2017-18	40	12	24	0	4	142	165	28	7th of 9 Yeck Div - PJHL	Lost Div Quarters 2-4 (Hawks)
2018-19	40	4	32	0	4	84	212	12	9th of 9 Yeck Div - PJHL	DNQ
2019-20	42	1	41	0	0	49	333	2	8th of 8 Yeck Div - PJHL	Lost Div Quarters 0-4 (Trojans)
2020-21	Season Lost due to COVID-19 pandemic									
2022-23	40	14	20	3	3	136	155	34	6th of 9 Yeck Div - PJHL	Lost Div Quarters 1-4 (Stars)
2023-24	40	14	22	3	1	106	157	32	7th of 9 Yeck Div - PJHL	Lost Div Quarters 2-4 (Bulldogs)
2024-25	42	26	11	4	1	179	127	57	3rd of 8 Yeck Div; 5th of 16 West Conf; 21st of 63 - PJHL	Won Div Quarters 4-2 (Trojans); Lost Div Semi's 3-4 (Hawks)
2025-26	42	20	18	3	1	167	168	44	6th of 8 Yeck Div; 10th of 16 West Conf; 34th of 61 - PJHL	Lost Div Quarters 2-4 (Stars)

== Notable alumni ==
- Rumun Ndur
- Joe Thornton

Brandon Garner
