= Thamesford Trojans =

Canadian junior ice hockey team

- City: Thamesford, Ontario
- League: Provincial Junior Hockey League
- Division: Bauer
- Founded: 1976
- Home arena: Thamesford Area Recreation Centre
- Colours: Green, Yellow, and White
- General manager: Brad Underwood
- Head coach: John Caldarozzi

Championships
- League champions: 1990, 1991, 1992, 1995, 2003, 2008, 2010, 2011, 2012
- OHA Cups: 1990, 1991, 1992, 1995, 2003, 2008, 2010, 2011, 2012

The Thamesford Trojans are a Junior ice hockey team based in Thamesford, Ontario, Canada. They play in the Provincial Junior Hockey League of the Ontario Hockey Association.

== History ==
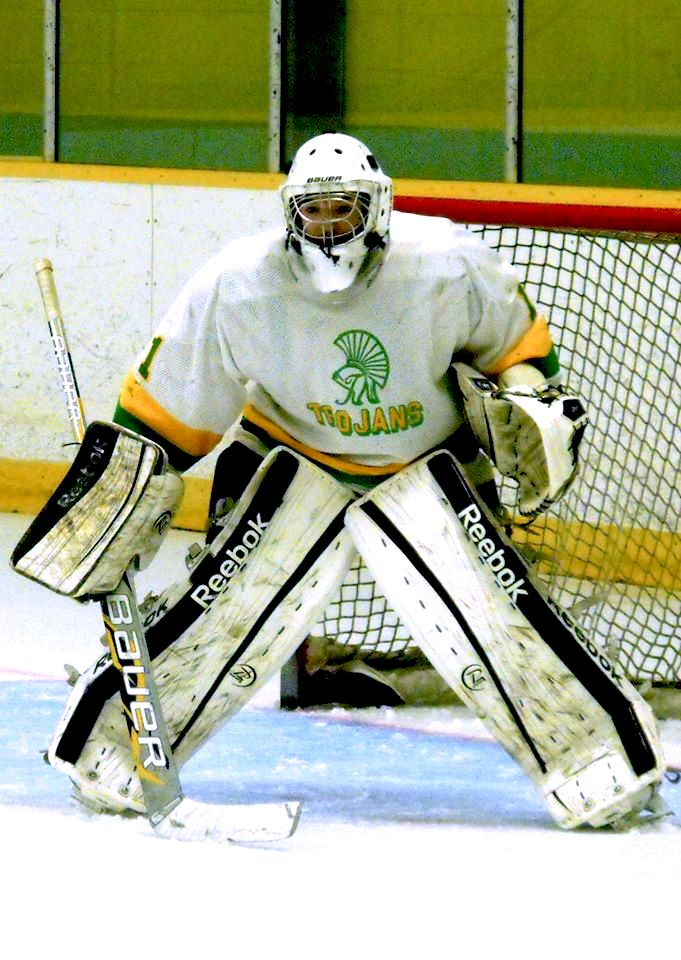
Trojans goalie Alex Hutcheson 2014.

The Thamesford Trojans were founded in 1976 as members of the Western Ontario Junior D Hockey League. In 1988, the league absorbed its competitor leagues and create a large "super league" that was renamed the OHA Junior Development League in 1991.

The Trojans from the 1989–90 until the 1991–92 season won three straight OHA Cups, the provincial championship.

In 1990, the Trojans fought all the way to the league finals. In the finals they met the Lucan Irish. After a hard-fought battle, the Trojans came out on top to win the series 4-games-to-2 and win their first ever OHA Cup.

The 1991 playoffs saw them reach the OHAJDL finals as well. Their opponents again were the Lucan Irish. The Trojans improved on the 1990 finals by defeating the Irish 4-games-to-1 to win their second straight OHA Cup.

The 1992 playoffs again saw the Trojans reach the championship series of the OHAJDL, which was once again against the Lucan Irish. This time the Trojans completely dominated and swept the series 4-games-to-none to win a third straight OHA Cup. The victory marked the first time since the award was first presented in 1948 that a team had won it three consecutive years.

In 1993, they made the OHAJDL finals once again, but ran into a team other than Lucan. The Mitchell Hawks had won the other conference and were challenging for the OHA Cup for the first time since 1973. The Hawks were not to be denied as they won the series 4-games-to-1 and broke the Trojan dynasty.

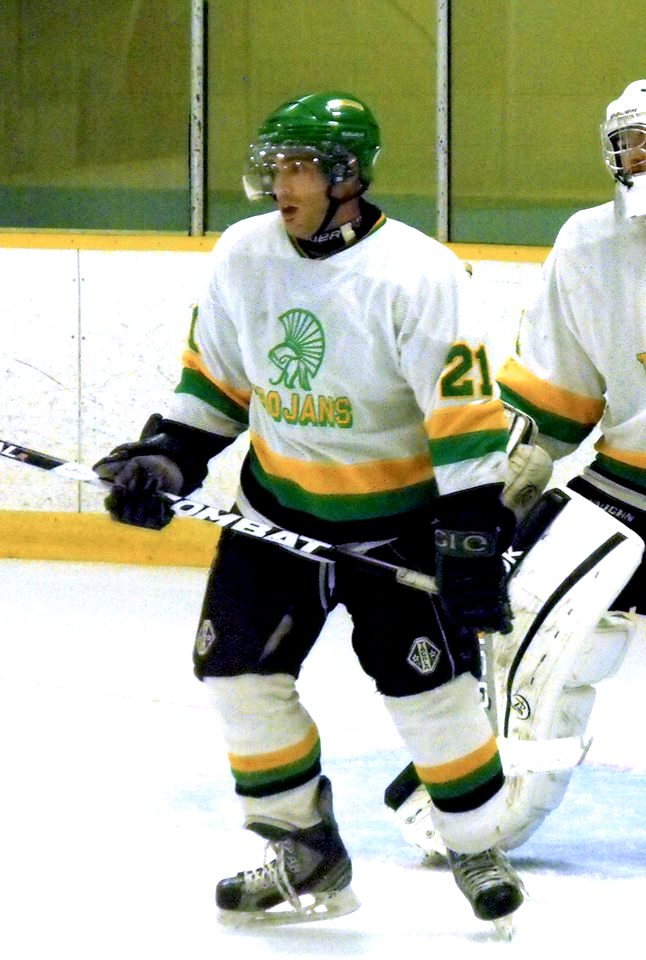
Trojans player in 2014.

The Trojans finished the 1994–95 season in first place with 34 wins and only 2 losses on the entire season. They pushed through to the OHAJDL finals and met the Port Stanley Lakers. The Trojans defeated the Lakers 4-games-to-2 to clinch their fourth OHA Cup.

In 2003, the Trojans finished tenth overall in the OHAJDL. In the playoffs, the Trojans baffled their competitors and made it all the way to the OHA Cup final. Their opponent, another team that was unexpected, the eighth-seeded Wellesley Applejacks, were standing between the Trojans and a fifth OHA Cup. The Trojans could not be stopped as they swept the Applejacks 4-games-to-none to win another league title.

After a strong winning season, the Trojans started out the 2006 playoffs against the Mount Brydges Bulldogs. The Bulldogs fell to the Trojans 4-games-to-1. In the second round of the playoffs, the Trojans drew the West Lorne Lakers, whom they swept 4-games-to-none. In the conference final, the Trojans found themselves up against a Cinderella-story Lucan Irish. The Irish upset the Trojans 4-games-to-1 to bounce them from the playoffs and went on to win the OHA Cup.

In 2006, the OHAJDL was disbanded and replaced with the Southern Ontario Junior Hockey League. Again in 2007, the Trojans finished off the season with an excellent record. In the first round of the playoffs, the Trojans drew the Lucan Irish and were able to exact revenge for the 2006 upset by defeating them 4-games-to-1. In the second round, the Trojans were pitted against the North Middlesex Stars. The Trojans beat the Stars 4-games-to-1 as well. In the conference final, Thamesford ran into the eventual league champion for the second consecutive year as they fell to the Mitchell Hawks 4-games-to-2.

== Season-by-season standings ==
Season	GP	W	L	T	OTL	GF	GA	P	Results	Playoffs
1976-77	32	11	16	5	-	151	188	27	6th WJDHL	
1977-78	34	12	20	2	-	171	222	26	6th WJDHL	
1978-79	33	19	11	3	-	151	129	41	5th WJDHL	
1979-80	34	17	17	0	-	182	172	34	4th WJDHL	
1980-81	34	16	15	3	-	183	156	35	5th WJDHL	
1981-82	36	21	12	3	-	203	165	45	5th WJDHL	
1982-83	35	12	17	5	-	158	171	29	8th WJDHL	
1983-84	34	13	16	5	-	147	166	31	6th WJDHL	
1984-85	33	6	24	3	-	117	195	15	9th WJDHL	
1985-86	41	18	18	5	-	233	210	41	7th WJDHL	
1986-87	42	21	14	7	-	246	192	49	4th WJDHL	
1987-88	40	20	12	8	-	247	191	48	4th WJDHL	
1988-89	35	21	12	2	-	232	176	44	6th WJDHL	
1989-90	35	25	9	1	-	228	129	51	3rd WJDHL	
1990-91	39	34	1	2	2	348	169	72	1st WJDHL	
1991-92	35	26	7	1	1	235	115	54	3rd OHAJDL	
1992-93	40	32	4	4	0	281	151	68	2nd OHAJDL	
1993-94	40	26	11	3	-	224	165	55	3rd OHAJDL	
1994-95	39	34	2	3	0	279	104	71	1st OHAJDL	
1995-96	38	21	13	4	0	184	122	46	6th OHAJDL	
1996-97	38	22	12	1	3	185	140	48	6th OHAJDL	
1997-98	40	25	11	0	4	196	155	54	4th OHAJDL	
1998-99	40	22	13	1	4	179	156	49	6th OHAJDL	
1999-00	40	27	9	4	0	230	143	58	3rd OHAJDL	Won Div. semi-final 4-1 (Bulldogs); Lost Div. final 0-4 (Lakers)
2000-01	40	27	10	2	1	--	--	57	4th OHAJDL	Won Div. semi-final 4-1 (Hawks); Lost Div. final 3-4 (Bulldogs)
2001-02	40	28	12	0	0	205	147	56	4th OHAJDL	Won Div. semi-final 4-1 (Lancers); Won Div. final 4-2 (Lakers); Lost Conference final 2-4 (Hawks)
2002-03	40	18	17	2	3	176	160	41	10th OHAJDL	Won Div. semi-final 4-0 (Lakers); Won Div. final 4-2 (Lancers); Won Conference Final 4-3 (Hawks); Won OHA Cup 4-0 (Applejacks)
2003-04	40	18	15	4	3	172	174	43	8th OHAJDL	Lost Conference quarter-final 0-4 (Lakers)
2004-05	39	20	14	3	2	162	135	45	10th OHAJDL	Lost Div semi-final 1-4 (Bulldogs)
2005-06	36	21	11	3	1	167	131	46	8th OHAJDL	Won Conference quarter-final 4-1 (Bulldogs); Won Conference semi-final 4-0 (Lakers); Lost Conference Final 2-4 (Irish)
2006-07	40	22	15	0	3	187	161	47	8th SOJHL	Won Conference quarter-final 4-1 (Irish); Won Conference semi-final 4-1 (Stars); Lost Conference Final 2-4 (Hawks)
2007-08	40	27	11	-	2	211	148	56	3rd SOJHL	Won Conference quarter-final 4-3 (Irish); Won Conference semi-final 4-3 (Stars); Won Conference Final 4-0 (Bulldogs); Won OHA Cup 4-0 (Braves)
2008-09	40	32	8	-	0	197	139	64	3rd SOJHL	Won Conference semi-final 4-0 (Applejacks); Won Conference final 4-1 (Braves); 3rd in round robin and eliminated (Stars) & (Travellers)
2009-10	36	26	8	-	2	191	141	54	4th SOJHL	Won Conference semi-final 4-3 (Sailors); Won Conference final 4-3 (Braves); 2nd in round robin (Hawks) & (Travellers); Won OHA Cup 4-3 (Hawks)
2010-11	36	23	9	-	4	178	149	50	3rd SOJHL	Won Conference semi-final 4-0 (Lancers); Won Conference final 4-1 (Stars); Won OHA Cup 4-0 (Ayr Centennials)
2011-12	36	26	6	-	4	176	114	56	1st SOJHL	Won Div. semi-final 4-3 (Bulldogs); Won Div. final 4-0 (Lancers); Won OHA Cup 4-0 (Hawks)
Southern Ontario Junior Hockey League - Jr "C"
2012-13	37	18	17	-	2	179	177	38	5th SOJHL-Yk	Won Conference quarter-final 4-0 (Hawks); Lost Conference Semi-final 0-4 (Lancers)
2013-14	40	30	8	-	2	200	143	62	2nd SOJHL	Won quarter-final 4-2 (Hawks); Lost Semi-final 0-4 (Dolphins)
2014-15	40	14	21	-	5	156	200	33	6th SOJHL	Lost Quarter - 1-4 - (Hawks)
2015-16	40	20	20	0	-	209	198	40	6th of 9 SOJHL	Lost Quarter - 0-4 - (Spitfires)
2016-17	40	11	27	2	-	149	188	24	7th of 9 Yeck Div - PJHL	Lost Div. Quarter, 1-4 (Hawks)
2017-18	40	20	20	0	0	150	180	40	5th of 9 Yeck Div - PJHL	Lost Div. Quarter, 2-4 (Stars)
2018-19	40	24	13	2	1	169	134	51	5th of 9 Yeck Div - PJHL	Won Div. Quarter, 4-0 (Stars); Lost Div. Semis 0-4 (Dolphins)
2019-20	42	28	10	3	1	189	108	60	1st of 8 Yeck Div - PJHL	Won Div. Quarter, 4-0 (Sailors); Won Div. Semis 4-1 (Dolphins) incomplete Div. Final 0-0 (Hawks) playoffs cancelled due to COVID-19 pandemic.
2020-21	Season Lost due to COVID-19 pandemic									
2021-22	30	14	12	3	1	96	86	32	1st of 8 Yeck Div - PJHL	Won Div. Quarter, 4-2 (Dolphins); Won Div. Semis 4-3 (Hawks); Lost Div. Final 0-4 (Stars)
2022-23	39	25	9	4	1	162	104	55	3rd of 9 Yeck Div - PJHL	Won Div. Quarter, 4-0 (Irish); Won Div. Semis 4-0 (Stars); Won Div. Final 4-3 (Bulldogs); Lost Conference Final 0-4 (Canadiens)
2023-24	40	30	9	0	1	171	89	61	1st of 9 Yeck Div - PJHL	Won Div. Quarter, 4-1 (Irish); Won Div. Semis 4-0 (Hawks); Won Div. Final 4-1 (Bulldogs); Lost Conference Final 0-4 (Canadiens)
2024-25	42	20	19	1	2	149	139	43	6th of 8 Yeck Div; 10th of 16 West Conf; 34th of 63 - PJHL	Lost Div. Quarter, 2-4 (Sailors)
2025-26	42	26	12	4	0	184	147	56	2nd of 8 Yeck Div; 5th of 16 West Conf; 20th of 61 - PJHL	Won Div. Quarter, 4-0 (Spitfires); Lost Div.Semifinal 0-4 (Stars)

=== Playoffs ===
- 1990 Won League

Thamesford Trojans defeated Lucan Irish 4-games-to-2 in final

- 1991 Won League

Thamesford Trojans defeated Lucan Irish 4-games-to-1 in final

- 1992 Won League

Thamesford Trojans defeated Lucan Irish 4-games-to-none in final

- 1993 Lost final

Mitchell Hawks defeated Thamesford Trojans 4-games-to-1 in final

- 1995 Won League

Thamesford Trojans defeated Port Stanley Lakers 4-games-to-2 in final

- 2003 Won League

Thamesford Trojans defeated Wellesley Applejacks 4-games-to-none in final

- 2006 Lost conference final

Thamesford Trojans defeated Mount Brydges Bulldogs 4-games-to-1 in conf. quarter-final
Thamesford Trojans defeated West Lorne Lakers 4-games-to-none in conf. semi-final
Lucan Irish defeated Thamesford Trojans 4-games-to-1 in conf. final

- 2007 Lost conference final

Thamesford Trojans defeated Lucan Irish 4-games-to-1 in conf. quarter-final
Thamesford Trojans defeated North Middlesex Stars 4-games-to-1 in conf. semi-final
Mitchell Hawks defeated Thamesford Trojans 4-games-to-2 in conf. final

- 2008 Won League

Thamesford Trojans defeated Lucan Irish 4-games-to-3 in conf. quarter-final
Thamesford Trojans defeated North Middlesex Stars 4-games-to-3 in conf. semi-final
Thamesford Trojans defeated Mount Brydges Bulldogs 4-games-to-0 in conf. final
Thamesford Trojans defeated Tavistock Braves 4-games-to-0 in final

- 2009 Lost round robin

Thamesford Trojans defeated Wellesley Applejacks 4-games-to-0 in conf. semi-final
Thamesford Trojans defeated Tavistock Braves 4-games-to-1 in conf. final
Thamesford Trojans defeated by North Middlesex Stars and Delhi Travellers in semi-final round robin

- 2010 Won League, won OHA Cup

Thamesford Trojans defeated Port Stanley Sailors 4-games-to-3 in conf. semi-final
Thamesford Trojans defeated Tavistock Braves 4-games-to-3 in conf. final
Thamesford Trojans and Exeter Hawks defeated Delhi Travellers in semi-final round robin
Thamesford Trojans defeated Exeter Hawks 4-games-to-3 in final

- 2011 Won league, won OHA Cup

Thamesford Trojans received first-round bye.
Thamesford Trojans defeated Lambeth Lancers 4-games-to-0 in conf. semifinal.
Thamesford Trojans defeated North Middlesex Stars 4-games-to-1 in conf. final.
Thamesford Trojans defeated Ayr Centennials 4-games-to-1 in OHA Cup final.

- 2012 Won league, won OHA Cup

Thamesford Trojans received first-round bye.
Thamesford Trojans defeated Mount Brydges Bulldogs 4-games-to-3 in conf. semifinal.
Thamesford Trojans defeated Lambeth Lancers 4-games-to-0 in conf. final.
Thamesford Trojans defeated Exeter Hawks 4-games-to-0 in OHA Cup final.

- 2013 Lost semifinals

Thamesford Trojans defeated Exeter Hawks 4-games-to-0 in quarter-finals.
Lambeth Lancers defeated Thamesford Trojans 4-games-to-0 in semifinals.

- 2014 Lost semifinals

Thamesford Trojans defeated Exeter Hawks 4-games-to-2 in quarter-finals
Dorchester Dolphins defeated Thamesford Trojans 4-games-to-0 in semifinals

== Notable alumni ==
- Steve Rucchin
