= Mount Brydges Bulldogs =

Canadian junior ice hockey team

- City: Mount Brydges, Ontario
- League: Provincial Junior Hockey League
- Founded: 1975
- Home arena: Tri-Township Arena
- Colours: Black, red, yellow, and white
- President: Andy Friyia
- General manager: Brian Griffiths
- Head coach: Paul Hopkins

Championships
- League champions: 1984, 1997, 2001, 2005
- OHA Cups: 1984, 1997, 2001

The Mount Brydges Bulldogs are a junior ice hockey team based in Mount Brydges, Ontario, Canada. They play in the Provincial Junior Hockey League and are three-time provincial champions.

== History ==
The Mount Brydges Bulldogs were founded in 1975 as members of the Western Junior D Hockey League.

The 1983–84 season saw the Bulldogs pull off a 22–7–5 record. They won their first Western league championship, despite competition from the Exeter Hawks, who only suffered a total of two losses during the regular season. In the provincial final, the Bulldogs met the Grand Valley Harvesters of the Northern Junior D Hockey League, winning their first series 4-2.

The Bulldogs were a tough team until the mid-1980s. In 1988, the Western league absorbed the Southern league and became an 18-team super-league. From then into the mid-1990s, the Bulldogs struggled. In 1991, the Western League was disbanded and replaced with the OHA Junior Development League.

The 1996–97 season proved to be one of the best ever for the Bulldogs. At the end of the regular season, they were at the top of the league with 34 wins and only three losses. They battled through three rounds of playoffs to meet the Wellesley Applejacks at the OHAJDL finals. The Bulldogs earned their second OHA Cup with a 4-0 sweep.

The Bulldogs finished the 2000–01 season in eighth place overall, with a record of 23 wins and 14 losses. They defeated their competition in the first three rounds of the playoffs to win their conference title. In the provincial championship final, they met the Wellesley Applejacks, who were caught flat-footed and defeated 4-1. This marked the Bulldogs' third provincial championship.

The 2004–05 season was a strong one for the Bulldogs, who finished sixth place overall in the OHAJDL. They again battled through the first three rounds of the playoffs, winning their conference. In the end, they met the Hagersville Hawks, an opponent who was not to be denied an OHA Cup. The Bulldogs lost the series 4-1.

The Bulldogs finished the 2005-06 season with a .500 record and ranked eleventh place overall. In the first round of the playoffs, they pulled off a major upset, knocking off the number one-ranked Mitchell Hawks 4-2. In round 2, they met the Thamesford Trojans, who defeated the Bulldogs 4-1.

Mount Brydges pulled off a 21-win season in 2006-07, and finished in tenth place overall. In the first round of the playoffs, they lost 4-1.

2007–2008 proved to be their best regular season in franchise history. With 36 wins and only three losses, the Bulldogs were number one in the league, with 73 points. They swept their way through the first two rounds of the playoffs before meeting the perennial powerhouse Thamesford Trojans in the Yeck Conference finals. Thamesford powered past Mount Brydges 4-0, en route to their 2008 championship.

The 2008–2009 season was another great season in the history of the franchise, with 33 wins and only six losses, finishing first overall. The Bulldogs again swept their way to the Conference Final before losing to the eventual league champions North Middlesex Stars 4-1.

The 2009–2010 season brought changes within the organization, resulting in a third-place finish for the regular season and first-round knockout in the playoffs.

During the 2017–2018 season, the Bulldogs and North Middlesex Stars engaged in the inaugural season series titled the Battle of Highway 81. The Bulldogs won the series on the final day of the regular season and beat the Stars by a 3-2 season tally.

Battle of Highway 81 Series scores 2017–18:

- Game 1: Stars 4-2 Bulldogs
- Game 2: Bulldogs 3-1 Stars
- Game 3: Stars 5-2 Bulldogs
- Game 4: Bulldogs 5-2 Stars
- Game 5: Bulldogs 4-1 Stars

== Season-by-season standings ==
Season	GP	W	L	T	OTL	GF	GA	P	Results	Playoffs
1975-76	27	1	23	3	-	106	251	5	8th WJDHL	
1976-77	32	15	14	3	-	207	183	33	5th WJDHL	
1977-78	34	21	7	6	-	235	156	48	4th WJDHL	
1978-79	32	3	29	0	-	92	242	6	10th WJDHL	
1979-80	34	3	30	1	-	130	313	7	10th WJDHL	
1980-81	32	0	32	0	-	84	387	0	10th WJDHL	
1981-82	35	11	20	4	-	129	164	26	9th WJDHL	
1982-83	36	20	10	6	-	169	129	46	2nd WJDHL	
1983-84	34	22	7	5	-	187	115	49	2nd WJDHL	Won League, won OHA Championship
1984-85	33	22	9	2	-	169	140	46	4th WJDHL	
1985-86	42	27	11	4	-	223	130	58	4th WJDHL	
1986-87	41	23	14	4	-	204	179	50	3rd WJDHL	
1987-88	39	15	21	3	-	172	207	33	8th WJDHL	
1988-89	35	19	15	1	-	190	156	39	9th WJDHL	
1989-90	35	14	17	4	-	133	137	32	10th WJDHL	
1990-91	40	12	23	4	1	139	188	29	15th WJDHL	
1991-92	40	11	24	3	2	132	196	27	15th OHAJDL	
1992-93	38	14	18	4	2	150	182	34	13th OHAJDL	
1993-94	40	22	17	1	-	234	185	45	8th OHAJDL	
1994-95	39	11	22	2	4	143	194	28	15th OHAJDL	
1995-96	38	21	10	5	2	190	142	49	5th OHAJDL	
1996-97	38	34	3	0	1	236	102	69	1st OHAJDL	Won League, won OHA Championship
1997-98	39	13	24	1	1	136	152	28	15th OHAJDL	
1998-99	40	19	18	2	1	154	155	41	9th OHAJDL	
1999-00	40	28	10	2	0	217	139	58	2nd OHAJDL	Lost div. semi-final 1-4 (Trojans)
2000-01	40	23	14	2	1	--	--	49	8th OHAJDL	Won div. semi-final 4-0 (Hawks); Won div. final 4-3 (Trojans); Won conference final 4-0 (Centenaires); Won OHA Cup 4-1 (Applejacks)
2001-02	40	25	14	1	0	211	144	51	5th OHAJDL	Lost div. semi-final 3-4 (Lakers)
2002-03	40	15	24	1	0	129	166	31	16th OHAJDL	Lost div. semi-final 0-4 (Hawks)
2003-04	40	14	21	2	3	142	177	33	15th OHAJDL	Lost div. semi-final 2-4 (Lancers)
2004-05	40	24	12	3	1	166	135	52	6th OHAJDL	Won div. semi-final 4-1 (Trojans); Won div. final 4-1 (Hawks); Won conference final 4-3 (Lakers); Lost final 1-4 (Hawks)
2005-06	38	16	16	5	1	155	145	38	11th OHAJDL	Lost conference quarter-final 1-4 (Trojans)
2006-07	40	21	18	0	1	165	186	43	10th SOJHL	Lost conference quarter-final 1-4 (Lancers)
2007-08	40	36	3	-	1	222	121	73	1st SOJHL	Won conference quarter-final 4-0 (Hawks); Won conference semi-final 4-0 (Lakers); Lost conference final 0-4 (Trojans)
2008-09	40	33	6	-	1	185	129	67	1st SOJHL	Won conference semi-final 4-0 (Hawks); Lost conference final 1-4 (Stars)
2009-10	36	26	7	-	3	197	115	55	3rd SOJHL	Lost conference semi-final 1-4 (Hawks)
2010-11	36	21	12	-	3	166	151	45	6th SOJHL	Won quarter-final 4-3 (Irish); Lost semi-final 2-4 (Stars)
2011-12	36	21	15	-	0	159	129	42	8th SOJHL	Lost quarter-final 0-4 (Hawks)
Southern Ontario Junior Hockey League - Jr "C"
2012-13	37	14	17	-	6	128	162	34	7th SOJHL	Lost first round 2-4 (Braves)
2013-14	40	8	31	-	1	100	195	17	8th SOJHL	Lost quarter-final 0-4 (Lancers)
2014-15	40	28	9	-	3	199	134	59	2nd SOJHL	Won quarter-final 4-0 (Sailors); Lost semi-final 0-4 (Hawks)
2015-16	40	21	19	0	-	206	173	42	4th of 9 SOJHL	Won quarter-final, 4-1 (Lucan Irish); Lost semi-final 0-4 (Dolphins)
2016-17	40	18	20	2	-	153	175	38	5th of 9 Yeck Div -PJHL	Lost div. quarter-final 3-4 (Lancers)
2017-18	40	16	21	0	3	127	166	35	6th of 9 Yeck Div -PJHL	Lost div. quarter-final 1-4 (Dolphins)
2018-19	40	9	28	3	0	108	158	21	8th of 9 Yeck Div -PJHL	Lost div. quarter-final 1-4 (Dolphins)
2019-20	42	28	12	1	1	198	118	58	3rd of 8 Yeck Div -PJHL	Won div. quarter-final 4-1 (Spitfires); Lost div. semi-final 1-4 (Hawks)
2020-21	Season lost due to COVID-19 pandemic									
2021-22	30	18	9	1	2	101	79	39	2nd of 7 Yeck Div -PJHL	Won div. quarter-final 4-0 (Sailors); Lost div. semi-final 1-4 (Stars)
2022-23	40	29	7	3	1	169	105	62	1st of 8 Yeck Div -PJHL	Won div. quarter-final 4-0 (Flyers); Won div. semi-final 4-0 (Hawks); Lost div. final 3-4 (Trojans)
2023-24	40	29	9	1	1	199	129	60	2nd of 8 Yeck Div -PJHL	Won div. quarter-final 4-2 (Sailors); Won div. semi-final 4-2 (Stars); Lost div. final,1-4 (Trojans)
2024-25	42	25	12	3	2	159	128	55	4th of 8 Yeck Div; 6th of 16 West Conf; 24th of 63 -PJHL	Won div. quarter-final 4-2 (Stars); Lost div. semi-final 2-4 (Flyers)
2025-26	42	24	14	4	0	173	133	52	5th of 8 Yeck Div; 7th of 16 West Conf; 29th of 61 -PJHL	Won div. quarter-final 4-1 (Flyers); Won div. semi-final 4-2 (Hawks); Won Yeck finals 4-3 (Stars); Lost West Conf 0-4 (Canadiens)

=== Playoffs ===
- 1984 Won league, won OHA Championship

Mount Brydges Bulldogs defeated Grand Valley Harvesters 4-2 in OHA final

- 1997 Won league

Mount Brydges Bulldogs defeated Wellesley Applejacks 4-0 in final

- 2001 Won league, won OHA Championship

Mount Brydges Bulldogs defeated Wellesley Applejacks 4-1 in final

- 2005 Won League, lost OHA Championship

Hagersville Hawks defeated Mount Brydges Bulldogs 4-1 in final

- 2006 Lost conference semi-final

Thamesford Trojans defeated Mount Brydges Bulldogs 4-1 in conf. semi-final

- 2008 Lost conference final

Mount Brydges Bulldogs defeated Exeter Hawks 4-0 in conf. quarter-final
Mount Brydges Bulldogs defeated West Lorne Lakers 4-0 in conf. semi-final
Thamesford Trojans defeated Mount Brydges Bulldogs 4-0 in conf. final

- 2009 Lost conference final

Mount Brydges Bulldogs defeated Exeter Hawks 4-0 in conf. quarter-final
Mount Brydges Bulldogs defeated Port Stanley Sailors 4-0 in conf. semi-final
North Middlesex Stars defeated Mount Brydges Bulldogs 4-1 in conf. final

- 2010 Lost quarter-final
- 2011 Lost semi-final

Mount Brydges Bulldogs defeated Lucan Irish 4-3 in quarter-final
Thamesford Trojans defeated Mount Brydges Bulldogs 4-0 in semi-final

== Notable alumni ==
- Jason Williams
