= Exeter Hawks =

Canadian junior ice hockey team

- City: Exeter, Ontario
- League: Provincial Junior Hockey League
- Division: Yeck
- Founded: 1961
- Home arena: South Huron Recreation Centre
- Colours: Black, yellow, and white
- General manager: Mark Livermore (2022–present)
- Head coach: Assistant coach: Dan Schiedel Assistant coach: Brendon Merritt Goalie coach: Devyn Clark

Championships
- League champions: 1971, 1972, 1977, 1978, 1996, 2002, 2004, 2015, 2019, 2026
- OHA Cups: 1972, 1977, 1996, 2002, 2004, 2015

The Exeter Hawks are a junior ice hockey team based in Exeter, Ontario, Canada. They play in the Provincial Junior Hockey League of the Ontario Hockey Association.

== History ==
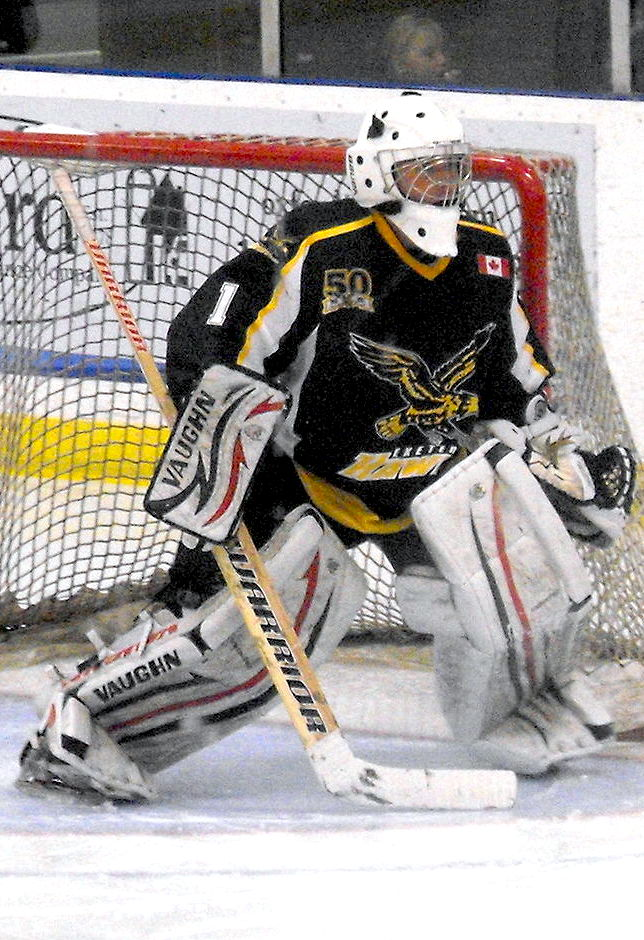
Hawks goalie readies for a shot early in the 2013–14 season.

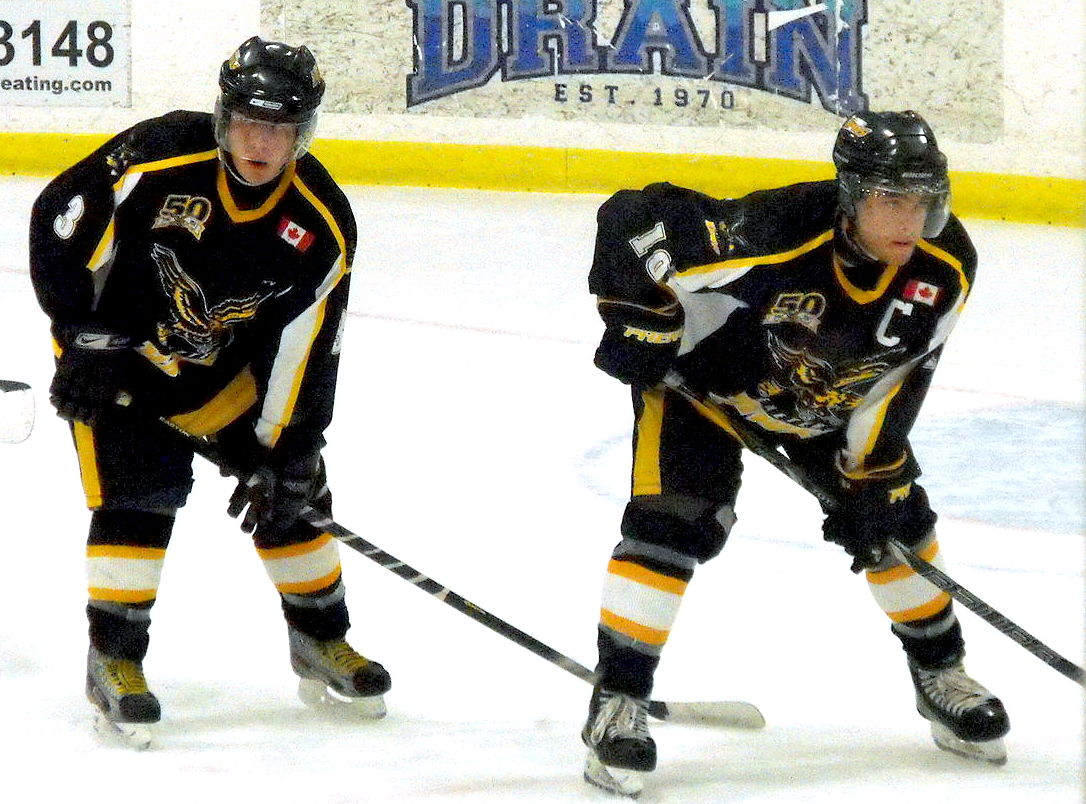
Hawks line up for a draw early in the 2013–14 season.

The Exeter Hawks were founded in 1961 as members of the Shamrock Junior D Hockey League. In the late sixties, the Hawks jumped to the Bluewater Junior Hockey League for a short stint. In 1969, the Shamrock league changed its name to the Western Junior D Hockey League.

In 1970–71, the Hawks won the Western League and made it all the way to the OHA provincial championship. They met another junior team from Haliburton, Ontario from the South Central Junior D Hockey League. Haliburton defeated the Hawks 4-3.

A season later, the Hawks again won the Western League and found themselves against an Eastern Ontario representative from Bancroft, Ontario in the provincial final. This year, the Hawks swept Bancroft 4-0 to win the OHA Cup for the first time.

In 1977, the Hawks won their third Western League title and advanced to the provincial championship. Their opponents were the Stayner Siskins, which they defeated 4-0 to win their second provincial championship.

The next year, the Hawks again won the Western League and ran into the Lakefield Chiefs in the OHA Cup final. The Chiefs overpowered the Hawks in the end, defeating Exeter in Game 7 of the series to claim the OHA Cup 4-3.

The playoffs for the 2019–20 season were cancelled due to the COVID-19 pandemic, leading to the team not being able to play a single game.

== Season-by-season standings ==
Season	GP	W	L	T	OTL	GF	GA	P	Results	Playoffs
1967-68	24	13	9	2	-	124	95	28	2nd BWJHL	Won BW Jr. D, lost OHA Cup SF
1968-69	30	17	10	3	-	161	132	37	2nd WOJCHL	Lost final
1969-70	30	19	6	5	-	159	110	43	1st WJDHL	Won League, lost OHA Cup SF
1970-71	34	26	4	4	-	216	103	56	1st WJDHL	Won League, lost OHA Cup F
1971-72	29	20	8	1	-	178	114	41	1st WJDHL	Won League, won OHA Cup
1972-73	31	23	5	3	-	175	109	49	1st WJDHL	
1973-74	34	12	18	4	-	149	172	28	6th WJDHL	
1974-75	32	15	14	3	-	174	158	33	5th WJDHL	
1975-76	28	13	13	2	-	138	126	28	5th WJDHL	
1976-77	31	23	6	2	-	214	103	48	1st WJDHL	
1977-78	34	24	7	3	-	231	129	51	1st WJDHL	
1978-79	34	21	11	2	-	199	140	44	3rd WJDHL	
1979-80	34	12	19	3	-	140	199	27	6th WJDHL	
1980-81	33	13	14	6	-	178	173	32	7th WJDHL	
1981-82	39	27	11	1	-	228	134	55	2nd WJDHL	
1982-83	38	16	20	2	-	167	204	34	5th WJDHL	
1983-84	34	29	2	3	-	240	124	61	1st WJDHL	
1984-85	34	16	13	5	-	190	186	37	6th WJDHL	
1985-86	42	5	35	2	-	152	350	12	12th WJDHL	
1986-87	40	16	16	8	-	200	188	40	8th WJDHL	
1987-88	35	25	7	3	-	229	136	53	1st WJDHL	
1988-89	36	17	13	6	-	189	171	40	8th WJDHL	
1989-90	35	20	13	2	-	183	134	42	8th WJDHL	
1990-91	39	27	8	3	1	196	129	58	3rd WJDHL	
1991-92	40	19	17	4	0	214	190	42	7th OHAJDL	
1992-93	40	20	15	5	0	248	187	45	8th OHAJDL	
1993-94	40	23	14	3	-	235	169	49	6th OHAJDL	
1994-95	39	21	14	3	1	216	165	46	6th OHAJDL	
1995-96	38	30	4	4	0	196	110	64	1st OHAJDL	
1996-97	37	27	6	2	2	183	116	58	3rd OHAJDL	
1997-98	39	23	14	1	1	157	144	48	6th OHAJDL	
1998-99	40	11	24	3	2	114	155	27	16th OHAJDL	
1999-00	40	17	22	1	0	161	181	35	11th OHAJDL	Lost div. semi-final 2-4 (Hawks)
2000-01	40	18	20	2	0	--	--	38	11th OHAJDL	Lost div. semi-final 0-4 (Mount Brydges Bulldogs)
2001-02	40	30	6	3	1	209	138	64	1st OHAJDL	Won div. semi-final 4-1 (Stars); Won div. final 4-1 (Irish); Won conference final 4-2 (Trojans); Won OHA Cup 4-0 (Braves)
2002-03	40	29	8	3	0	198	119	61	1st OHAJDL	Won div. semi-final 4-0 (Bulldogs); Won div. final 4-0 (Irish); Lost conference final 3-4 (Trojans)
2003-04	40	28	7	3	2	188	126	61	3rd OHAJDL	Won div. semi-final 4-0 (Stars); Won div. final 4-2 (Irish); Won conference final 4-0 (Lakers); Won OHA Cup 4-2 (Braves)
2004-05	40	23	14	2	1	162	132	49	7th OHAJDL	Lost conference quarter-final 2-4 (Hawks)
2005-06	38	23	12	2	1	169	112	49	6th OHAJDL	Lost conference quarter-final 0-4 (Irish)
2006-07	40	8	31	0	1	145	232	17	4th SOJHL-Mor	DNQ
2007-08	40	12	27	-	1	156	228	25	4th SOJHL-Mor	Lost conference quarter-final 0-4 (Bulldogs)
2008-09	40	17	21	-	2	167	206	36	4th SOJHL-Yk	Lost conference semi-final 0-4 (Bulldogs)
2009-10	36	24	11	-	1	167	120	49	3rd SOJHL-Yk	Won conference semi-final 4-1 (Mount Brydges Bulldogs); Won conference final 4-1 (Stars); 1st in round robin (Trojans & Travellers); Lost final 3-4 (Trojans)
2010-11	36	22	12	-	2	129	111	46	2nd SOJHL-Yk	Lost div. quarter-final 2-4 (Lancers)
2011-12	36	24	7	-	5	154	113	53	3rd SOJHL-Yk	Won div. quarter-final 4-1 (Stars); Lost div. semi-final 2-4 (Lancers)
Southern Ontario Junior Hockey League - Jr "C"
2012-13	37	18	16	-	3	128	140	39	4th SOJHL-Yk	Lost quarter-final 0-4 (Trojans)
2013-14	40	12	26	-	2	108	161	26	7th SOJHL	Lost quarter-final 2-4 (Trojans)
2014-15	40	28	11	-	1	212	152	57	3rd SOJHL	Won quarter-final 4-1 (Trojans); Won semi-final 4-0 (Bulldogs); Won League 4-0 (Dolphins); Lost CSC quarter-final 0-4 (Essex)
2015-16	40	32	8	0	-	255	150	64	2nd of 9 SOJHL	Won quarter-final 4-0 (Sailors); Won semi-final 4-0 (Spitfires); Lost League final 3-4 (Dolphins)
2016-17	40	26	14	0	-	255	150	26	2nd of 9 Yeck Div; PJHL	Won quarter-final 4-1 (Trojans); Lost semi-final 0-4 (Spitfires)
2017-18	39	29	8	0	2	151	86	60	2nd of 9 Yeck Div; PJHL	Won quarter-final 4-2 (Sailors); Lost semi-final 0-4 (Dolphins)
2018-19	40	29	8	0	3	186	126	61	2nd of 9 Yeck Div; PJHL	Won quarter-final 4-0 (Spitfires); Won semi-final, 4-1 (Lancers); Won div. finals, 4-1 (Dolphins); Won West Conference final 4-3 (Canadiens); Lost CSC semi-final 2-4 (Peach Kings)
2019-20	42	28	11	2	1	191	107	59	2nd of 9 Yeck Div; PJHL	Won quarter-final 4-0 (Irish); Won semi-final 4-1 (Bulldogs); Incomplete League final 0-0 (Trojans); Playoffs cancelled due to COVID-19
2020-21	Season lost due to COVID-19 pandemic									
2021-22	30	22	5	2	1	102	77	47	1st of 7 Yeck Div; PJHL	Lost quarter-final 3-4 (Trojans)
2022-23	39	23	11	3	2	141	111	51	5th of 9 Yeck Div; PJHL	Won quarter-final 4-2 (Dolphins); Lost semi-final 0-4 (Bulldogs)
2023-24	40	15	20	2	3	122	148	35	6th of 9 Yeck	Lost quarter-final 0-4 (Stars); Lost semi-final 0-4 (Trojans)
2024-25	42	26	10	2	4	172	123	58	2nd of 8 Yeck; 4th of 16 West Conf; 20th of 63 - PJHL	Won quarter-final 4-0 (Spitfires); Won semi-final 4-3 (Sailors); Lost final 2-4 (Flyers)
2025-26	42	27	12	3	0	184	130	57	1st of 8 Yeck; 4th of 16 West Conf; 17th of 61 - PJHL	Won quarter-final 4-0 (Irish); Lost semi-final 2-4 (Bulldogs)

=== Playoffs ===
- 1971 Won League, lost OHA final

Haliburton Juniors defeated Exeter Hawks 4-3 in OHA final

- 1972 Won League, won OHA championship

Exeter Hawks defeated Bancroft Juniors 4-0 in OHA final

- 1977 Won League, won OHA championship

Exeter Hawks defeated Stayner Siskins 4-0 in OHA final

- 1978 Won League, lost OHA final

Lakefield Chiefs defeated Exeter Hawks 4-3 in OHA final

- 1988 Lost OHA and League final

Lambeth Lancers defeated Exeter Hawks 4-2 in OHA final

- 1996 Won League

Exeter Hawks defeated Wellesley Applejacks 4-3 in final

- 1998 Lost final

Wellesley Applejacks defeated Exeter Hawks 4-3 in final

- 2002 Won League

Exeter Hawks defeated Tavistock Braves 4-0 in final

- 2004 Won League

Exeter Hawks defeated Tavistock Braves 4-2 in final

- 2006 Lost conference quarter-final

Lucan Irish defeated Exeter Hawks 4-0 in conf. quarter-final

- 2015 Won League

Exeter Hawks defeated Dorchester Dolphins 4-0 in final
