= North Middlesex Stars =

Canadian junior ice hockey team

- City: Parkhill, Ontario
- League: Provincial Junior Hockey League
- Founded: 1992
- Home arena: North Middlesex & District Arena
- Colours: Red, White and Black
- General manager: Kory Green (2022-Present)
- Head coach: Kory Green (2021-Present)
- Captain: Brayden Heessels (2024-2025)

Franchise history
- 1992–93: Parkhill Stars; 1993–present: North Middlesex Stars

Championships
- League champions: 2009
- OHA Cups: 2009

The North Middlesex Stars are a Junior ice hockey team based in Parkhill, Ontario, Canada. They play in the Provincial Junior Hockey League of the Ontario Hockey Association.

== History ==
The team was founded in 1992 as the Parkhill Stars. After only one season, the team name was changed to the North Middlesex Stars.

The early years were rough on the North Middlesex Stars. In the team's first thirteen seasons, only 2 years did they have winning records.

In the summer of 2005, the team was on the verge of implosion. The community came together and saved the team. In the 2005–06 season, they celebrated their third ever winning record. In the summer of 2006, the OHA Junior Development League dissolved and was replaced by the Southern Ontario Junior Hockey League(SOJHL). Since the formation of the SOJHL, the Stars have been a standout team. In 2006-07, they finished 3rd overall with 30 victories. In 2007-08, they finished 4th overall with 27 victories.

In 2008-09, the Stars celebrated their fourth consecutive winning season with 25 victories and a 4th-place finish in the regular season. They would end up winning their conference and also win the OHA Cup, defeating the Dehli Travellers in 7 games.

In 2012, the Ontario Hockey Association approved the SOJHL's jump from Junior "D" to Junior "C". In 2016, the SOJHL would be merged into the Provincial Junior Hockey League (PJHL) and the Stars would play in the Yeck division. The Stars won the division in 2022, but would be swept by the Lakeshore Canadiens in the West Conference Finals.

== Season-by-season standings ==
Season	GP	W	L	T	OTL	GF	GA	P	Results	Playoffs
1992-93	39	8	30	0	1	135	273	17	18th OHAJDL	
1993-94	40	7	31	2	-	136	232	16	16th OHAJDL	
1994-95	38	10	24	1	3	132	205	24	16th OHAJDL	
1995-96	37	14	14	4	5	152	159	37	10th OHAJDL	
1996-97	38	18	17	1	2	167	167	39	11th OHAJDL	
1997-98	40	7	31	1	1	123	222	16	18th OHAJDL	
1998-99	40	11	24	2	3	116	162	27	17th OHAJDL	
1999-00	39	8	29	1	1	106	189	18	17th OHAJDL	Lost Div. semi-final 0-4 (Irish)
2000-01	40	12	22	4	2	--	--	28	14th OHAJDL	Lost Div. semi-final 0-4 (Lakers)
2001-02	40	14	23	2	1	141	179	31	15th OHAJDL	Lost Div. semi-final 0-4 (Hawks)
2002-03	40	18	16	4	2	162	165	42	9th OHAJDL	Lost Div. semi-final 1-4 (Irish)
2003-04	40	14	18	3	5	147	153	36	13th OHAJDL	Lost Div. semi-final 0-4 (Hawks)
2004-05	39	4	32	2	1	106	213	11	18th OHAJDL	DNQ
2005-06	38	19	17	1	1	165	147	40	10th OHAJDL	Won Conference quarter-final 4-1 (Lancers); Lost Conference semi-final 0-4 (Irish)
2006-07	40	30	6	0	4	193	123	64	3rd SOJHL	Won Conference quarter-final 4-2 (Lakers); Lost Conference semi-final 1-4 (Trojans)
2007-08	40	27	11	-	2	177	109	56	4th SOJHL	Won Conference quarter-final 4-1 (Hawks); Lost Conference semi-final 3-4 (Trojans)
2008-09	40	25	11	-	4	189	138	54	4th SOJHL	Won Conference semi-final 4-2 (Irish); Won Conference final 4-1 (Bulldogs); 1st in round robin (Travellers) & (Trojans); Won OHA Cup 4-3 (Travellers)
2009-10	36	30	4	-	2	166	102	62	1st SOJHL	Won Conference semi-final4-3 (Lancers); Lost Conference final 1-4 (Hawks)
2010-11	36	21	13	-	2	167	138	44	7th SOJHL	Won Conference quarter-final 4-3 (Sailors); Won Conference semi-final 4-2 (Bulldogs); Lost Conference final 1-4 (Trojans)
2011-12	36	11	24	-	1	118	176	23	13th SOJHL	Lost Conference quarter-final 1-4 (Hawks)
Southern Ontario Junior Hockey League - Jr "C"
2012-13	37	2	33	-	2	103	243	6	8th SOJHL-Yk	Lost Conference quarter-final 0-4 (Lancers)
2013-14	40	3	36	-	1	71	251	7	9th SOJHL	DNQ
2014-15	40	2	35	-	3	100	262	7	9th SOJHL	DNQ
2015-16	40	4	36	0	-	108	318	8	9th of 9 SOJHL	DNQ
2016-17	40	10	28	2	-	121	178	22	8th of 9 Yeck Div - PJHL	Lost Div quarterfinal, 1-4 (Dolphins)
2017-18	40	24	14	0	2	169	119	50	4th of 9 Yeck Div - PJHL	Won Div quarterfinal, 4-2 (Trojans); Lost Div Semifinal, 1-4 (Lancers
2018-19	40	24	12	1	3	155	119	52	4th of 9 Yeck Div - PJHL	Lost Div quarterfinal, 0-4 (Trojans)
2019-20	41	21	16	2	2	172	137	46	5th of 8 Yeck Div - PJHL	Lost Div quarterfinal, 0-4 (Dolphins)
2020-21	Season Lost due to COVID-19 pandemic									
2021-22	30	15	9	5	1	104	95	36	3rd of 7 Yeck Div - PJHL	Won Div quarterfinal, 4-0 (Irish); Won Div semifinals 4-1 (Bulldogs); Won Div Finals 4-0 (Dolphins); Lost Confer Finals 0-4 (Canadiens)
2022-23	40	27	8	2	3	203	104	59	2nd of 8 Yeck Div - PJHL	Won Div quarterfinal, 4-1 (Sailors); Lost Div semifinals 0-4 (Trojans)
2023-24	40	28	9	1	2	203	104	59	3rd of 8 Yeck Div - PJHL	Won Div quarterfinal, 4-1(Flyers); Lost Div Semifinals, 2-4 (Bulldogs)
2024-25	42	23	15	3	1	167	156	50	5th of 8 Yeck Div; 7th of 16 West Conf; 28th of 63 - PJHL	Lost Div quarterfinal, 2-4 (Bulldogs)
2025-26	42	25	14	3	0	167	143	53	3rd of 8 Yeck Div; 6th of 16 West Conf; 25th of 61 - PJHL	Won Div quarterfinal, 4-2(Sailors); Won div Semifinals 4-1 (Trojans); Lost Yeck Finals 3-4 (Bulldogs)
