= Lambeth Lancers =

Canadian junior ice hockey team

- City: Lambeth, Ontario
- League: Provincial Junior Hockey League
- Division: Yeck
- Founded: 1987
- Folded: 2019
- Home arena: Lambeth Arena
- Colours: Blue, Red, and White
- Owners: Flandscape; Terry Graham and Josh Flanagan
- General manager: Tony Mandarelli(2015-16)
- Head coach: Dylan Thomas (2017-18)
- Affiliate: London Nationals (GOJHL)

Championships
- League champions: 1988, 1989, 2018
- Clarence Schmalz Cups: None
- OHA Cups: 1988, 1989

The Lambeth Lancers were a Junior ice hockey team based in Lambeth, Ontario, Canada. They played in the Provincial Junior Hockey League of the Ontario Hockey Association.

== History ==
The Lambeth Lancers were founded in 1987 as members of the Western Ontario Junior D Hockey League. The Lancers were created in the tradition of the Lambeth Flyers who were members of the same league from 1968 until 1975.

In the 1988 playoffs, the Lancers won the Western league title in their first season. They challenged the Exeter Hawks of the Southern Counties Junior D Hockey League in the final and defeated them 4-games-to-2 to win their first ever OHA Cup.

The next season, the Western and Southern Counties leagues merged to create a "super league". The Lancers won the league's championship by defeating the Lucan Irish 4-games-to-none to win their second straight OHA Cup.

In 1991, the Western Junior D league became the OHA Junior Development League.

In 2000, the Lambeth Lancers ceased operations due to financial problems. The team was put on the shelf and their rights were put on sale. After a year of waiting, the team was bought and resurrected by the Western Ontario Hockey League's London Nationals who were looking for a farm team.

2001 saw the resurrection and the Lancers and them making the playoffs in their first year, thanks to the likes of an offensive prowess in Jay Mocszelt and Josh Ryan who came over from the Port Stanley Lakers club. Mike Borrows and his brother Jeff (15 at the time) and a collection of other young talent being groomed for a transition to the Jr. B London Nationals team. Coach Dan Dolbear led the team during these years with few players that moved on to bigger and better things. Standouts included defenseman Brad Meagher, who led all defencemen in the league in points in his rookie season and logged a considerable amount of ice-time for the team. He went on to acquire the best defenseman trophy in the Yeck conference each year he played as well as leading defenseman scoring in those years. Jeff Borrows (5'8") went on to play Jr. B and then on to semi-pro in the US. Mike Borrows went on to become the GM of the London Nationals from 2013 to 2016, winning 2 Western Conference Championships and a Sutherland Cup. Notable team matchups during the 2001-2005 era were the Thamesford Trojans, Exeter Hawks, Mount Brydges Bulldogs and West Lorne (and former Port Stanley) Lakers.

The 2005–06 season saw the Lancers finish in ninth place overall. They entered the conference quarter-final against the North Middlesex Stars and were defeated 4-games-to-1.

The 2006–07 season ended with the Lancers finishing in fifth place overall in the league. The OHAJDL disbanded at the end of the 2005–06 season and was replaced by the Southern Ontario Junior Hockey League. In the first round of the playoffs, the Lancers drew the Mount Brydges Bulldogs. The Lancers defeated the Bulldogs 4-games-to-1 to advance to the conference semi-final. The second round of the playoffs pitted the Lancers against the red-hot Mitchell Hawks. The Hawks swept the Lancers 4-games-to-none and eventually went on to win the OHA Cup as SOJHL champions.

The 2010–2011 season was one of the worst in Lancers history. The Lancers ended the season with 16 winless games, two losses coming in overtime. The Lancers weren't expected to make any impact during the SOJHL playoffs. However, when facing the 2nd-place Exeter Hawks in the first round, the Lancers took part of SOJHL history by defeating the Hawks in 6 games in what would go down as one of the biggest upsets in the SOJHL playoffs. The "puck stopped there" as the Lancers went on to face the eventual OHA Jr. D champions, Thamseford Trojans, dropping 4 straight in the Conference Semi-final.

== Season-by-season standings ==
Season	GP	W	L	T	OTL	GF	GA	P	Results	Playoffs
1987-88	39	24	8	7	-	248	143	55	1st of 6 South Div. 2nd of 11 WJDHL	Won League; Won OHA Cup, 4-2 (Hawks)
1988-89	35	25	7	3	-	215	112	53	1st of 6 Central Div. 3rd of 19 WJDHL	Won League, 4-0 (Irish)
1989-90	35	19	10	6	-	151	120	44	3rd of 6 Central Div. 7th of 18 WJDHL	
1990-91	40	19	17	2	2	173	162	42	4th of 9 Western Div. 7th of 18 WJDHL	
1991-92	40	19	17	4	0	175	184	42	5th of 9 Western Div. 9th of 17 OHAJDL	
1992-93	40	17	20	2	1	211	202	37	5th of 9 Western Div. 10th of 18 OHAJDL	
1993-94	40	20	15	5	-	179	177	45	5th of 9 Western Div. 9th of 18 OHAJDL	Won Div. QF, 4-3 (Hawks); Won Div. SF, 4-3 (Hawks); Lost Div. Final, 3-4 (Lakers)
1994-95	40	26	12	2	0	183	148	54	2nd of 9 Western Div. 3rd of 18 OHAJDL	Won Div. QF, 4-2 (Lakers); Lost Div. SF, 0-4 (Trojans)
1995-96	38	15	19	2	2	137	165	34	4th of 5 Thomas Div. 8th of 10 Yeck Conf. 12th of 18 OHAJDL	Won Div. SF, 4-2 (Lakers)
1996-97	38	12	19	3	4	133	172	31	4th of 5 Thomas Div. 9th of 10 Yeck Conf. 13th of 18 OHAJDL	
1997-98	38	15	18	3	2	127	144	35	4th of 5 Thomas Div. 8th of 10 Yeck Conf. 13th of 18 OHAJDL	Lost Div. SF, 1-4 (Lakers)
1998-99	40	14	19	6	1	139	173	35	5th of 5 Thomas Div. 7th of 10 Yeck Conf. 12th of 18 OHAJDL	
1999-00	39	19	17	2	1	172	160	41	4th of 5 Thomas Div. 5th of 10 Yeck Conf. 8th of 18 OHAJDL	Lost Div. SF, 2-4 (Lakers)
2000-01	Did Not Participate									
2001-02	40	22	17	1	0	180	170	45	4th of 5 Thomas Div. 5th of 9 Yeck Conf. 7th of 19 OHAJDL	Lost Div. SF, 1-4 (Trojans)
2002-03	40	24	9	5	2	205	152	55	1st of 5 Thomas Div. 2nd of 9 Yeck Conf. 3rd of 19 OHAJDL	Won Div. SF, 4-1 (Bombers); Lost Div. Final, 2-4 (Trojans)
2003-04	40	21	16	2	1	158	149	45	1st of 5 Thomas Div. 3rd of 9 Yeck Conf. T-6th of 18 OHAJDL	Won Div. SF, 4-2 (Bulldogs); Lost Div. Final, 2-4 (Lakers)
2004-05	40	24	11	2	3	189	135	53	1st of 5 Thomas Div. 2nd of 9 Yeck Conf. 5th of 18 OHAJDL	Lost Conf. QF, 3-4 (Lakers)
2005-06	37	20	12	5	0	174	142	45	2nd of 5 Thomas Div. 4th of 9 Yeck Div. 9th of 18 OHAJDL	Lost Conf. QF, 0-4 (Stars)
2006-07	40	22	12	0	6	192	144	50	1st of 5 Thomas Div. 3rd of 9 Yeck Conf. 6th of 17 SOJHL	Won Conf. QF, 4-1 (Bulldogs); Lost Conf. SF, 0-4 (Hawks)
2007-08	40	20	17	-	3	182	147	43	3rd of 5 Thomas Div. 4th of 9 Yeck Conf. 9th of 17 SOJHL	Lost Conf. QF, 1-4 (Lakers)
2008-09	40	12	22	-	6	133	169	30	5th of 5 Yeck Div. 13th of 14 SOJHL	DNQ
2009-10	36	18	18	-	0	156	166	36	4th of 5 Yeck Div. 10th of 15 SOJHL	Lost Div. SF, 3-4 (Stars)
2010-11	36	7	26	-	3	120	187	17	7th of 7 Yeck Div. 14th of 15 SOJHL	Won Div. QF, 4-2 (Hawks); Lost Div. SF, 0-4 (Trojans)
2011-12	36	26	9	-	1	174	124	53	2nd of 7 Yeck Div. 3rd of 15 SOJHL	Won Div. QF, 4-1 (Sailors); Won Div. SF, 4-2 (Hawks); Lost Div. Final, 0-4 (Trojans)
Southern Ontario Junior Hockey League - Jr "C"
2012-13	37	29	5	-	3	187	93	61	1st Yeck Div. 1st SOJHL	Won Div. QF, 4-0 (Stars); Won Div. SF, 4-0 (Trojans); Won Div. Final, 4-3 (Dolphins); Lost final, 0-4 (Centennials)
2013-14	40	31	8	-	1	193	91	63	1st of 9 SOJHL	Won quarter-final, 4-0 (Bulldogs); Won semi-final, 4-0 (Sailors); Lost final, 0-4 (Dolphins)
2014-15	40	31	7	-	2	213	112	64	1st of 9 SOJHL	Won quarter-final, 4-3 (Spitfires); Lost semi-final, 1-4 (Dolphins)
2015-16	40	10	30	0	-	171	260	20	8th of 9 SOJHL	Lost quarter-final, 0-4 (Dolphins)
2016-17	40	18	19	3	-	181	149	39	4th of 9 Yeck Div. PJHL	Won Div. QF, 4-3 (Bulldogs); Lost Div. SF, 0-4 (Dolphins)
2017-18	39	34	5	0	0	218	89	68	1st of 9 Yeck Div. PJHL	Won Div. QF, 4-0 (Spitfires); Won Div. SF, 4-1 (Stars); Won Div. Final, 4-1 (Dolphins); Won Conf. Final, 4-3 (Canadiens); Lost semi-final, 2-4 (Rangers)
2018-19	40	25	12	1	2	176	121	53	3rd of 9 Yeck Div. PJHL	Won Div. QF, 4-2 (Irish); Lost Div. SF, 1-4 (Hawks)
