= Lucan Irish =

Junior ice hockey team based in Lucan Biddulph, Ontario

Lucan Irish Six
- City: Lucan Biddulph, Ontario
- League: Provincial Junior Hockey League
- Division: Yeck
- Founded: 1968
- Home arena: Lucan Community Memorial Centre
- Colours: Kelly Green, Black, and White, 4th colour Goldenrod
- General manager: Sandra Neubauer
- Head coach: Mark Muscutt, John Fletcher, Brandon Lamoureux

Championships
- League champions: 1982, 1987, 1999, 2006
- OHA Cups: 1982, 1987, 1999, 2006

The Lucan Irish are a Junior ice hockey team based in Lucan Biddulph, Ontario. They play in the Provincial Junior Hockey League of the Ontario Hockey Association.

== History ==
The Irish were founded in 1968 as the Lucan Irish Six and played their first season in 1969-70.

In 1982, the Irish won the Western Ontario Junior D Hockey League's championship. They went on to defeat the Langton Thunderbirds of the Southern Counties Junior D Hockey League 4-games-to-1 to win the OHA Cup as provincial champions.

In 1987, the Irish again won the Western Junior D's playoff title. They defeated the Tavistock Braves of the Southern Counties Junior D league 4-games-to-3 to win the OHA Cup for the second time as provincial champions.

In 1988, all remaining Junior D leagues were consolidated into the Western Junior league. In 1991, the league dropped the Junior D label and became the OHA Junior Development League. Starting in 1988, the Irish set out to prove they were the "cream of the crop" in this new league. After the 1988-89 season, the Irish made it all the way to the league finals, but were thwarted by the Lambeth Lancers. In 1990, 1991, and 1992, the same scenario repeated over and over again. The Irish would finish highly ranked in their league, would make it all the way to the finals and three years in a row they would meet the Thamesford Trojans who beat them each time.

In 1999, after finishing second overall in the league standings the Irish fought all the way back to the league final. The Irish defeated the Wellesley Applejacks 4-games-to-3 to win their third ever OHA Cup.

In 2006, the Irish twelfth overall in the OHAJDL standings. As low seed in the standings, the Irish were figured to lose out in the early rounds of the league playoffs. They entered the conference quarter-final against the Exeter Hawks and walked right through them with a 4-game-sweep. The conference semi-final had the same result against the North Middlesex Stars. The conference final was against their rivals, the Thamesford Trojans, whom they defeated in five games to enter into the league finals for the first time in seven seasons. In the final, they met the Delhi Travellers. A tight series, the Irish were not to be denied as they defeated the Travellers 4-games-to-2 to win their fourth OHA Cup.

After the 2006-07 season, the OHAJDL was disbanded and the Southern Ontario Junior Hockey League was formed. In the 2006-07 season, they finished seventh overall in the league. In the league's conference quarter-finals, the Irish met their match in the Thamesford Trojans who defeated them 4-games-to-1.

In 2016, the SOJHL combined with 7 other leagues to form the Provincial Junior Hockey League. The SOJHL because the Yeck Division of the Western Conference.

On March 17, 2026, the team's board of directors announced via Instagram that the team would renew their membership in the league. However, later that day, the league announced that a new ownership, board of directors, and auxiliary group will be formed and that the team will stay in Lucan.

== Season-by-season standings ==
Season	GP	W	L	T	OTL	GF	GA	P	Results	Playoffs
1969-70	30	16	12	2	-	171	141	34	3rd WJDHL	
1970-71	34	18	15	1	-	184	177	37	3rd WJDHL	
1971-72	30	11	18	1	-	155	184	23	6th WJDHL	
1972-73	34	11	17	6	-	169	202	28	6th WJDHL	
1973-74	34	15	16	3	-	211	210	33	5th WJDHL	
1974-75	32	17	14	1	-	184	163	35	3rd WJDHL	
1975-76	27	17	7	3	-	149	98	37	2nd WJDHL	
1976-77	32	9	19	4	-	141	181	22	7th WJDHL	
1977-78	34	22	7	5	-	161	123	49	3rd WJDHL	
1978-79	33	12	13	8	-	185	160	32	6th WJDHL	
1979-80	34	23	9	2	-	198	132	48	3rd WJDHL	
1980-81	34	21	10	3	-	212	132	45	2nd WJDHL	
1981-82	40	21	17	2	-	205	171	44	6th WJDHL	
1982-83	38	21	14	3	-	200	155	45	3rd WJDHL	
1983-84	34	16	15	3	-	176	170	35	3rd WJDHL	
1984-85	34	16	13	5	-	184	168	37	5th WJDHL	
1985-86	42	31	6	5	-	281	132	67	1st WJDHL	
1986-87	42	28	7	7	-	274	168	63	1st WJDHL	
1987-88	40	16	16	8	-	207	175	40	7th WJDHL	
1988-89	36	30	6	0	-	248	146	60	1st WJDHL	
1989-90	35	25	4	6	-	218	129	56	1st WJDHL	
1990-91	40	30	4	4	2	222	108	66	2nd WJDHL	
1991-92	40	27	8	5	0	208	147	59	2nd OHAJDL	
1992-93	39	33	3	2	1	252	110	69	1st OHAJDL	
1993-94	40	27	11	2	-	225	147	56	3rd OHAJDL	
1994-95	40	21	17	1	1	190	173	44	9th OHAJDL	
1995-96	38	23	12	3	0	179	133	49	4th OHAJDL	
1996-97	38	19	15	3	1	168	145	42	8th OHAJDL	
1997-98	40	25	11	2	2	182	133	54	3rd OHAJDL	
1998-99	40	28	11	0	1	177	126	57	2nd OHAJDL	Won OHA Cup 4-3 (Applejacks)
1999-00	40	27	11	2	0	185	129	56	6th OHAJDL	Won Div semi-final 4-0 (Stars); Won Div final 4-2 (MHawks); Lost Conference Final 1-4 (Lakers)
2000-01	40	19	16	2	3	--	--	43	9th OHAJDL	Lost Div semi-final 3-4 (Centenaires)
2001-02	40	15	21	3	1	151	175	34	13th OHAJDL	Won Div semi-final 4-3 (MHawks); Lost Div final 1-4 (EHawks
2002-03	40	21	16	3	0	182	152	45	7th OHAJDL	Won Div semi-final 4-1 (Stars); Lost Div final 0-4 (EHawks
2003-04	40	26	8	4	2	187	132	58	4th OHAJDL	Won Div semi-final 4-1 (MHawks); Lost Div final 3-4 (EHawks
2004-05	40	26	12	2	0	178	139	54	4th OHAJDL	Won Div semi-final 4-0 (Bombers); Lost Div final 3-4 (Lakers)
2005-06	38	16	16	4	2	160	145	38	12th OHAJDL	Won Conference quarter-final 4-0 (Hawks); Won Conference semi-final 4-0 (Stars); Won Conference final 4-1 (Trojans); Won OHA Cup 4-2 (Travellers)
2006-07	40	24	15	0	1	175	152	49	7th SOJHL	Lost Conference quarter-final 1-4 (Trojans)
2007-08	40	17	22	-	1	151	174	35	12th SOJHL	Lost Conference quarter-final 3-4 (Trojans)
2008-09	40	18	19	-	3	140	140	39	8th SOJHL	Lost Conference semi-final 2-4 (Stars)
2009-10	36	10	22	-	4	132	194	24	13th SOJHL	DNQ
2010-11	36	15	16	-	5	128	157	35	12th SOJHL	Lost Conference quarter-final 3-4 (Bulldogs)
2011-12	36	11	23	-	2	127	171	24	12th SOJHL	Lost Div quarter-final 1-4 (Bulldogs)
Southern Ontario Junior Hockey League - Jr "C"
2012-13	37	16	17	-	4	153	171	36	6th SOJHL-Yk	Lost quarter-final 3-4 (Sailors)
2013-14	40	23	14	-	3	184	151	49	5th SOJHL	Lost quarter-final 3-4 (Sailors)
2014-15	40	28	12	-	0	217	161	56	4th SOJHL	Lost quarter - 1-4 - (Dolphins)
2015-16	40	20	19	1	0	182	199	41	5th of 9 SOJHL	Lost quarter - 1-4 - (Bulldogs)
2016-17	40	8	30	2	-	112	218	18	9th of 9 Yeck Div - PJHL	did not qualify for playoffs
2017-18	40	6	31	0	3	116	230	15	9th of 9 Yeck Div - PJHL	did not qualify for playoffs
2018-19	40	14	21	3	2	150	189	33	6th of 9 Yeck Div - PJHL	Lost quarters, 2-4 (Lancers)
2019-20	41	9	29	0	3	109	183	21	7th of 8 Yeck Div - PJHL	Lost quarters, 0-4 (Exeter Hawks)
2020-21	Season Lost due to COVID-19 pandemic									
2021-22	30	9	16	2	3	81	95	23	7th of 8 Yeck Div - PJHL	Lost quarters, 0-4 (Stars)
2022-23	40	18	19	2	1	146	143	39	6th of 9 Yeck Div - PJHL	Lost quarters, 0-4 (Trojans)
2023-24	40	9	28	3	0	113	192	21	8th of 9 Yeck Div - PJHL	Lost quarters, 1-4 (Trojans)
2024-25	42	8	32	1	1	104	229	18	8th of 8 Yeck Div; 15th of 16 West Conf; 56th of 63 - PJHL	Lost quarters, 0-4 (Flyers)
2025-26	42	4	36	2	0	104	271	10	8th of 8 Yeck Div; 15th of 16 West Conf; 59th of 61 - PJHL	Lost quarters, 0-4 (Hawks)

=== Playoffs ===
- 1982 Won league, won OHA championship

Lucan Irish defeated Langton Thunderbirds 4-games-to-1 in OHA championship

- 1987 Won league, won OHA championship

Lucan Irish defeated Tavistock Braves 4-games-to-3 in OHA championship

- 1989 Lost final

Lambeth Lancers defeated Lucan Irish 4-games-to-1 in final

- 1990 Lost final

Thamesford Trojans defeated Lucan Irish 4-games-to-2 in final

- 1991 Lost final

Thamesford Trojans defeated Lucan Irish 4-games-to-1 in final

- 1992 Lost final

Thamesford Trojans defeated Lucan Irish 4-games-to-0 in final

- 1999 Won League

Lucan Irish defeated Wellesley Applejacks 4-games-to-3 in final

- 2006 Won League

Lucan Irish defeated Exeter Hawks 4-games-to-none in conf. quarter-final
Lucan Irish defeated North Middlesex Stars 4-games-to-none in conf. semi-final
Lucan Irish defeated Thamesford Trojans 4-games-to-1 in conf. final
Lucan Irish defeated Delhi Travellers 4-games-to-2 in final

- 2007 Lost Conference quarter-final

Thamesford Trojans defeated Lucan Irish 4-games-to-1 in conf. quarter-final

- 2008 Lost Conference quarter-final

Thamesford Trojans defeated Lucan Irish 4-games-to-3 in conf. quarter-final

== Notable alumni ==
- Matt Read
