= Aylmer Spitfires =

- City: Aylmer, Ontario
- League: Provincial Junior Hockey League
- Conference: Western Conference
- Division: Yeck
- Founded: 1974
- Home arena: East Elgin Community Complex
- Colours: Gold, Red, white, and black
- President: Bradley Roloson
- General manager: Jamie Harwood/Vance Stark
- Head coach: Terry Walters
- Website: https://aylmerspitfires.pjhlon.hockeytech.com//

Franchise history
- 1974–1985: Tillsonburg Mavericks
- 1985–1991: Tillsonburg Titans
- 1991–2002: Aylmer Aces
- 2003–present: Aylmer Spitfires

The Aylmer Spitfires are a Canadian junior hockey team based in Aylmer, Ontario, Canada. They play in the Provincial Junior Hockey League.

== History ==
The franchise began in Tillsonburg as a Junior B team in 1974, first known as the Mavericks, then as the Titans from 1985 to 1991. In 1991, the franchise was moved to Aylmer and was named the Aylmer Aces. In 2003, the team dropped to Junior C as the Aylmer Spitfires.

In 2013, the Niagara & District Junior C Hockey League and the Southern Ontario Junior Hockey League realigned, sending the Spitfires into the SOJHL.

For the 2016/17 season the eight southern Ontario junior "C" hockey leagues combined to become the Provincial Junior Hockey League. Each league rebranded and became a division in the new organization. The SOJHL became the Yeck Division of the West Conference.

The playoffs for the 2019-20 season were cancelled due to the COVID-19 pandemic, leading to the team not being able to play a single game.

== Season-by-season record ==
Note: GP = Games Played, W = Wins, L = Losses, T = Ties, OTL = Overtime Losses, GF = Goals for, GA = Goals against

Season	GP	W	L	T	OTL	GF	GA	Points	Finish	Playoffs
1976-77	38	23	15	0	-	226	208	46	2nd SWJBHL	
1977-78	40	7	32	1	-	129	268	15	6th SWJBHL	DNQ
1978-79	42	8	30	4	-	199	287	20	8th GHJHL	
1979-80	41	16	16	9	-	--	--	41	3rd NJC-W	
1980-81	32	5	21	6	-	--	--	16	8th NJC-W	
1981-82	32	8	23	1	-	--	--	17	4th NJC-W	
1982-83	36	8	25	3	-	--	--	19	6th NJC-W	
1983-84	30	7	18	5	-	--	--	19	5th NJC-W	
1984-85	32	9	18	3	-	118	153	21	4th SWJCHL	
1985-86	42	7	32	3	-	155	260	17	8th WOJHL	DNQ
1986-87	42	9	29	4	-	177	279	22	7th WOJHL	DNQ
1987-88	42	6	32	1	3	157	305	16	8th WOJHL	DNQ
1988-89	42	1	39	1	1	100	384	4	8th WOJHL	DNQ
1989-90	39	4	32	2	1	132	294	11	9th WOJHL	DNQ
1990-91	48	3	42	2	1	135	294	9	9th WOJHL	DNQ
1991-92	48	12	33	1	2	137	254	27	5th WOJHL East	DNQ
1992-93	52	21	25	3	3	--	--	48	4th WOJHL East	Lost quarter-final
1993-94	51	19	29	2	1	211	260	41	3rd WOJHL East	Lost quarter-final
1994-95	52	32	18	0	2	296	223	66	3rd WOJHL East	Lost semi-final
1995-96	50	30	17	2	1	274	204	63	1st WOJHL East	Lost quarter-final
1996-97	51	24	22	2	3	220	221	53	4th WOJHL East	Lost quarter-final
1997-98	52	24	26	1	1	244	259	50	3rd WOJHL East	Lost quarter-final
1998-99	51	8	41	0	2	152	344	18	5th WOJHL East	Lost semi-final
1999-00	54	10	36	0	8	154	271	28	9th GOHL	DNQ
2000-01	54	23	30	0	1	195	228	47	8th GOHL	Lost quarter-final 2-4 (Maroons)
2001-02	54	2	51	1	0	100	408	5	10th GOHL	DNQ
2002-03	Did not participate									
2003-04	36	12	19	2	2	116	142	28	8th NJCHL	Lost Div semi-final 2-4 (Merchants)
2004-05	36	19	14	2	1	133	112	41	5th NJCHL	Lost Div semi-final 2-4 (Merchants)
2005-06	36	20	14	2	0	155	135	42	5th NJCHL	Lost quarter-final 2-4 (Merchants)
2006-07	36	23	10	2	1	166	129	49	5th NJCHL	Lost quarter-final 2-4 (Merchants)
2007-08	36	23	10	1	2	197	132	49	1st NJCHL	Won Quarter-final 4-0 (Firebirds); Lost semi-final 1-4 (Merchants)
2008-09	36	21	12	-	3	154	127	45	5th NJCHL	Lost quarter-final 1-4 (Storm)
2009-10	36	12	20	-	4	124	158	28	10th NJCHL	Lost quarter-final 3-4 (Firebirds)
2010-11	36	18	12	-	6	130	114	42	7th NJCHL	Won quarter-final 4-2 (Mounties); Lost semi-final 2-4 (Marchants)
2011-12	36	15	15	-	6	142	136	36	6th NJCHL	Lost semi-final 1-4 (Firebirds)
2012-13	38	12	22	-	4	125	179	28	5th NJC-W	Lost quarter-final 3-4 (Storm)
2013-14	40	20	20	-	0	148	167	40	6th SOJHL	Lost quarter-final 0-4 (Dolphins)
2014-15	40	10	28	-	2	128	184	22	8th SOJHL	Lost quarter - 3-4 - (Lancers)
2015-16	40	26	14	0	-	176	133	52	3rd of 9 SOJHL	Won quarter - 4-0 - (Trojans); Lost semifinals 0-4 (Hawks)
2016-17	40	25	13	2	-	163	142	52	3rd of 9 Yeck Div - PJHL	Won Div. Quarter, 4-0 (Sailors); Won Div Semifinal, 4-0 (Hawks); Lost Div Final, 3-4 Dolphins)
2017-18	40	11	28	0	1	129	190	23	8th of 9 Yeck Div - PJHL	Lost Div. Quarter, 0-4 (Lancers)
2018-19	40	15	24	0	1	120	171	31	7th of 9 Yeck Div - PJHL	Lost Div. Quarter, 0-4 (Hawks)
2018-19	40	15	24	0	1	120	171	31	7th of 9 Yeck Div - PJHL	Lost Div. Quarter, 0-4 (Hawks)
2019-20	42	21	21	0	0	146	158	42	6th of 8 Yeck Div - PJHL	Lost Div. Quarter, 1-4 (Bulldogs)
2020-21	Season Lost due to COVID-19 pandemic									
2021-22	Idle for this season									
2022-23	39	4	34	0	1	77	249	9	9th of 9 Yeck Div - PJHL	Did not qualify for post season play
2023-24	40	7	32	0	1	74	184	15	9th of 9 Yeck Div - PJHL	Did not qualify for post season play
2024-25	42	12	27	3	0	119	198	27	7th of 8 Yeck; 13th of 16 South Conf; 48th of 63 -PJHL	Lost Div. Quarter, 0-4 (Hawks)
2025-26	42	18	21	3	0	147	181	39	7th of 8 Yeck; 11th of 16 South Conf; 37th of 61 - PJHL	Lost Div. Quarter, 0-4 (Trojans)
