= Woodstock Lakers =

- City: Woodstock, Ontario
- League: Western Ontario Super Hockey League
- Founded: 1989
- Home arena: Southwood Arena
- Colours: Red, black, and white
- Owner: Jeff Zehr
- General manager: Jeff Zehr (2015–16)
- Head coach: Stephen Tulloch (2026-2027)

Franchise history
- 1989–2004: Port Stanley Lakers
- 2004–2011: West Lorne Lakers
- 2011–2015: Inactive
- 2015–2020: London Lakers
- 2020–2023: Plattsville Lakers
- 2023–Present: Woodstock Lakers

The Woodstock Lakers are a Semi-Pro ice hockey team based in the city of Woodstock, Ontario, Canada. The Lakers joined the Western Ontario Super Hockey League in 2022, after being a part of the Greater Metro Junior A Hockey League from 2015 to 2022. They were originally located in Port Stanley, Ontario, and then in West Lorne, Ontario, and London, Ontario, and Platteville, Ontario. They also formerly played in the Southern Ontario Junior Hockey League of the Ontario Hockey Association (OHA). The Lakers left the OHA in 2008 and played as an independent team.

== History ==
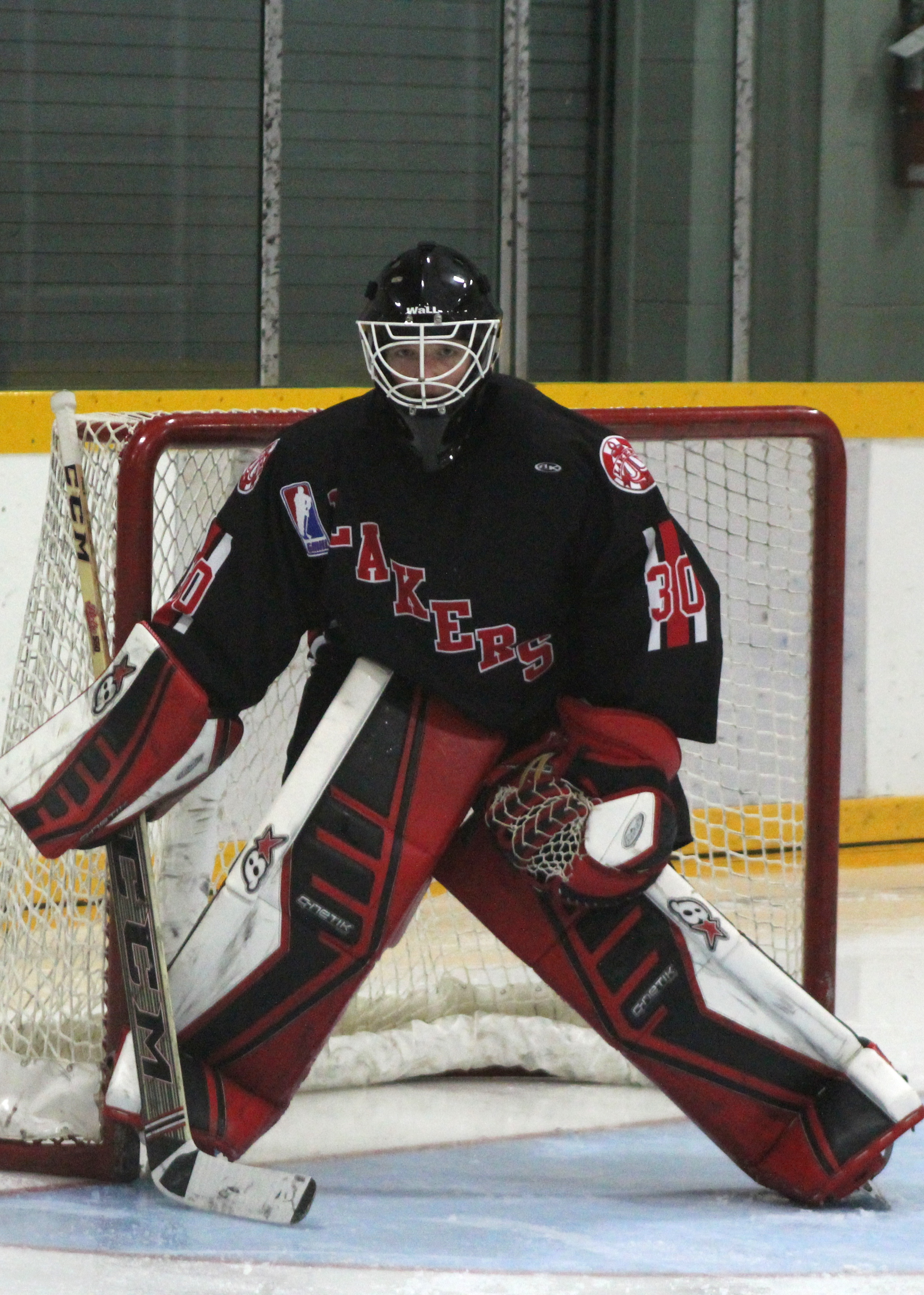
Lakers goalie during 2015–16 season.

The Port Stanley Lakers were founded in 1989 as members of the Western Ontario Junior D Hockey League. A large league comprising the remnants of multiple other Southern Ontario Junior leagues. In 1991, this league renamed itself the OHA Junior Development League.

In 1994, the Lakers finished first amongst all OHAJDL teams in the regular season with a stellar record of 36 wins, 2 losses, and 2 ties. They made it all the way to the league finals in the playoffs and found themselves nose-to-nose with the Mitchell Hawks. The Hawks were not to be denied as they swept the Lakers aside 4-games-to-none to win the OHA Cup as league champions.

The 1995 season saw the Lakers pull off a solid performance, finishing second overall. They pushed all the way to the OHAJDL finals once again. Their opponents this time around were the Thamesford Trojans. The Trojans defeated the Lakers 4-games-to-2 to win the OHA Cup.

The next season, the Lakers entered the playoffs and met the Lambeth Lancers in the first round. The Lancers meant business and defeated the Lakers 4-games-to-2 to put them out of the playoffs.

The Lakers finished the 1996–97 season in fifth place overall. In the first round of the playoffs, they met the Thamesford Trojans. They defeated the Trojans 4-games-to-none. In the second round, the Lakers were defeated by the Mount Brydges Bulldogs 4-games-to-2.

The Lakers showed great promise in the 1997–98 season, finishing second overall. They entered the playoffs against the Lambeth Lancers, whom they defeated 4-games-to-1. In the second round, the Lakers were up against the Thamesford Trojans who they also beat in five games. In the conference final, Port Stanley ran into the Exeter Hawks. In a drawn out series, the Hawks bested the Lakers in the seventh game to win the series 4-games-to-3 and deny the Lakers a chance at the OHA Cup.

The 1999–00 proved to be one for the ages for the Port Stanley Lakers. After finishing first overall in the OHAJDL with a record of 31 wins and 9 losses, the Lakers pushed deep into the playoffs. Their first opponents were the Lambeth Lancers, who the Lakers defeat 4-games-to-2. In the second round, the Lakers came up against the Thamesford Trojans and swept them 4-games-to-none. The conference finals were next and the Lakers were up against a tough Lucan Irish squad. The Irish couldn't handle the Lakers, as Port Stanley took the series 4-games-to-1. This earned the Lakers their first OHAJDL final since 1995. The Lakers challenged the Burford Bulldogs and defeated them 4-games-to-2 to win their franchises first ever OHA Cup.

The 2000–01 season marked the end of an era of domination for the Lakers. This was the last season for many that they would ride amongst the top teams in the standings. After finishing first overall in the league, the Lakers entered the playoffs against the North Middlesex Stars. The Lakers swept the Stars 4-games-to-none. In the second round of the playoffs, the Lakers met the Seaforth Centenaires. The underdog Centenaires took the Lakers to game seven and defeated them in an upset.

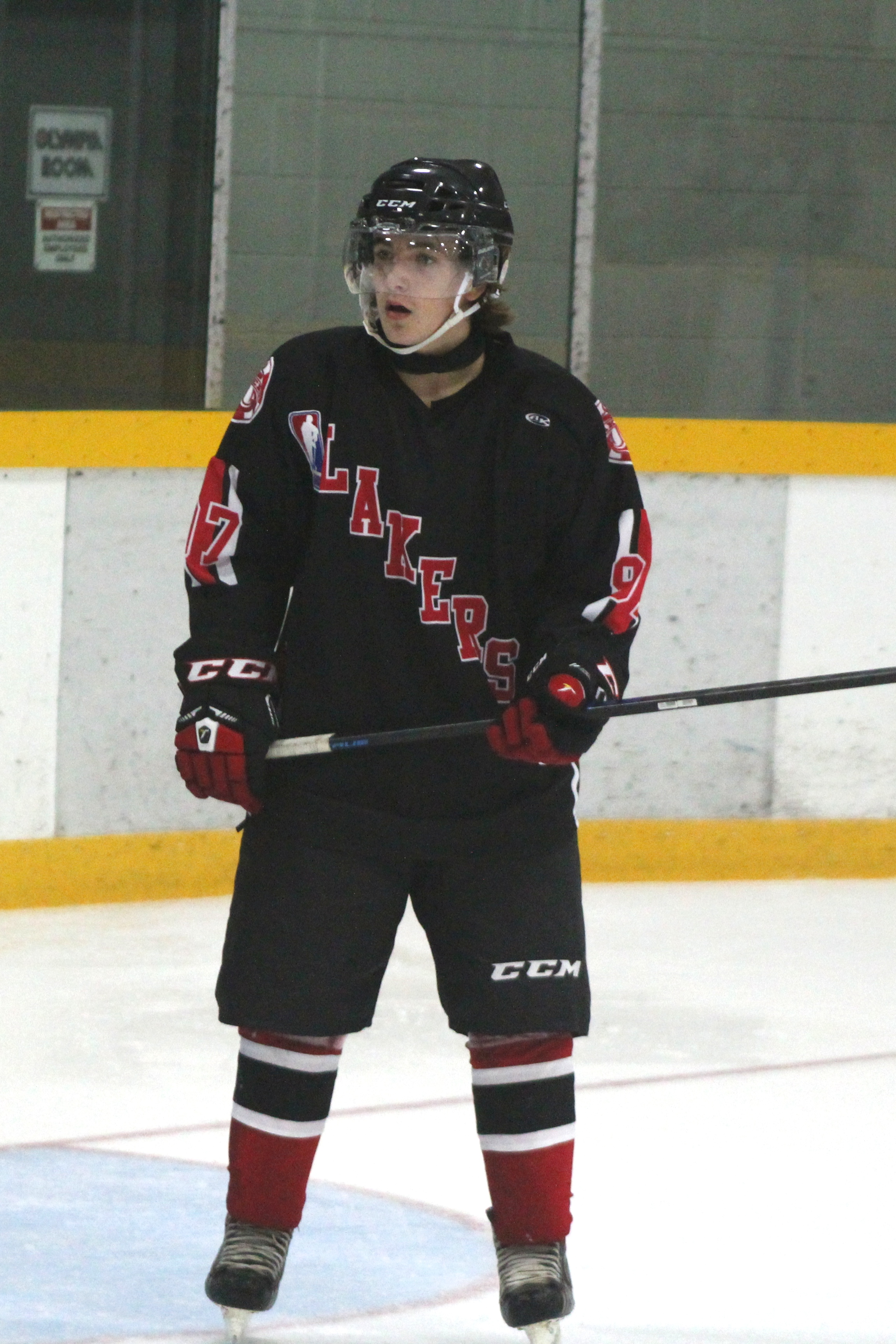
Lakers player during 2015–16 season.

In 2004, the Lakers met Thamesford in the first round of the playoffs and defeated them 4-games-to-none. In the second round, they met Lambeth and defeated them 4-games-to-2. In the conference final, the Lakers met the Exeter Hawks and were swept in four games.

During the off-season, the Lakers moved to West Elgin and became the West Lorne Lakers. In 2005, the Lakers met Lambeth in the first round of the playoffs and defeated them in seven games. They then met the Lucan Irish and again won the series in seven games. In the conference final, it appeared that the Lakers might do it again in game seven to the Mount Brydges Bulldogs. This time, the opponents prevailed and the Bulldogs won the series in seven games.

In 2006, the Lakers met the Exeter Hawks in the first round of the playoffs. The Hawks fell to the Lakers 4-games-to-2. In the second round of the playoffs, the Lakers fell to Thamesford 4-games-to-none.

In the off-season, the OHAJDL disbanded and the Southern Ontario Junior Hockey League was formed in its place. West Lorne finished low in the standings but still made the playoffs. They met the Lambeth Lancers in the first round and defeated them 4-games-to-2. In the second round of the playoffs, the Lakers lost to the North Middlesex Stars 4-games-to-2.

West Elgin Arena

Beginning in the 2008–09 season, the Lakers joined the local men's recreational league in London, posing a 19–1–0 record in their first year and winning their league in 2009, 2010, and 2011. The organization then went dormant in 2011.

=== Move to London ===
After nineteen seasons in the Ontario Hockey Association, the Lakers franchise announced that they will be leaving the OHA. "The Lakers will continue play in various forms at other venues outside the OHA," said team President Wayne Bedford. The team joined the GMHL in January 2015.

Beginning in 2015, the Lakers joined the Greater Metro Junior A Hockey League.

The Lakers gained international attention due to a video recorded during a road game against the Kingsville Kings on November 20, 2015. A brawl broke out when a London player struck Kingsville's goalie Jan Pechek. During the fight, a linesman struck a London player and then was attacked by a member of the London Lakers' bench staff.

The team left London in 2020 and re-located to Plattsville. At the end of the 21–22 season the GMHL announced that franchise has been suspended from the league, ownership then announced they were re-classifying to Semi-Pro and joining the WOSHL.

Following the 2022–2023 season, the Lakers re-located to Woodstock, Ontario and play their home games at Southwood Arena.

== Season-by-season records ==
Season	GP	W	L	T	OTL	GF	GA	Pts	Regular season finish	Playoffs
1989–90	35	5	27	3	—	113	214	13	18th WJDHL	
1990–91	40	23	12	5	0	174	152	51	5th WJDHL	
1991–92	40	19	15	3	3	146	161	44	6th OHAJDL	
1992–93	39	22	12	5	0	214	158	49	5th OHAJDL	
1993–94	40	36	2	2	—	331	126	74	1st OHAJDL	Lost Finals
1994–95	40	29	7	2	2	237	162	62	2nd OHAJDL	Lost Finals
1995–96	38	26	11	1	0	181	139	53	3rd OHAJDL	Lost Con. Quarter-finals
1996–97	38	23	12	1	2	217	141	49	5th OHAJDL	Lost Conf. Semi-finals
1997–98	39	28	8	1	2	194	114	57	2nd OHAJDL	Lost Conf. Finals
1998–99	40	20	15	4	1	188	153	45	8th OHAJDL	
1999–00	40	31	9	0	0	242	114	62	1st OHAJDL	Won League
2000–01	40	29	8	1	2	—	—	61	1st OHAJDL	Lost Conf. Semi-finals
2001–02	40	22	13	3	2	190	176	49	6th OHAJDL	
2002–03	40	16	22	1	1	167	202	34	13th OHAJDL	
2003–04	40	20	18	2	0	189	199	42	9th OHAJDL	Lost Conf. Finals
2004–05	38	16	18	4	0	177	188	36	12th OHAJDL	Lost Conf. Finals
2005–06	38	16	17	3	2	155	183	37	13th OHAJDL	Lost Conf. Semi-finals
2006–07	40	13	24	0	3	184	229	29	14th SOJHL	Lost Conf. Quarter-finals
2007–08	40	19	19	—	2	137	159	40	10th SOJHL	Lost Conf. Semi-finals
2008–2011: Played independent schedule
2011–2015: Inactive
London Lakers
2015–16	42	19	22	0	1	183	219	39	7th of 10, South Div. 19th of 30, GMHL	Lost Div. Quarter-finals, 0–3 (Toronto Attack)
2016–17	42	26	12	0	4	221	175	56	5th of 11, South Div. 9th of 21, GMHL	Lost Div. Quarter-finals, 1–3 (North York Renegades)
2017–18	42	3	38	0	1	136	450	7	12th of 12, South Div. 21st of 21, GMHL	Lost Elimination Game, 3–5 (Toronto Predators)
2018–19	42	3	36	0	3	107	356	9	12th of 12, South Div. 22nd of 22, GMHL	Lost Elimination Game, 1–3 (Northumberland Stars)
2019–20	42	20	22	0	0	216	242	40	6th of 10, South Div. 15th of 23, GMHL	Lost Div. Quarter-finals, 0–2 (North York Renegades)
Plattsville Lakers
2020–21	Season lost due to COVID-19 pandemic									
2021–22	38	12	25	0	1	128	172	25	6th of 9, South Div. 12th of 19, GMHL	Lost Div. Quarter-finals, 0–2 (Predators)
2022–23	24	6	15	0	3	88	157	13	8th of 9, WOSHL	Lost Quarter-finals, 0–3 (Tilbury Bluebirds)
