= Dorchester Dolphins =

Canadian junior ice hockey team

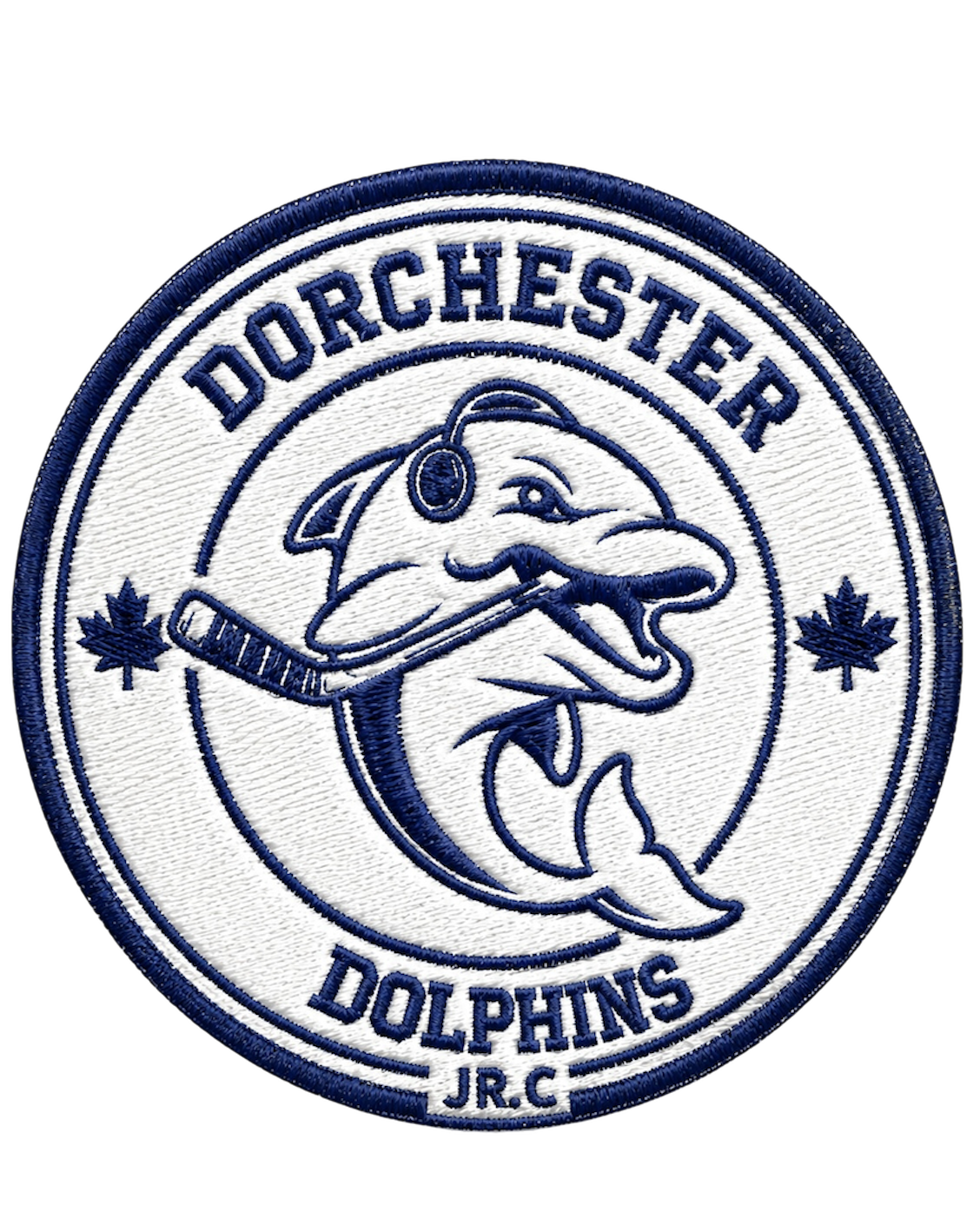
- City: Dorchester, Ontario, Canada
- League: Provincial Junior Hockey League
- Conference: South
- Division: Doherty
- Founded: 2012
- Home arena: Flight Exec Centre (capacity: 1,500)
- Colours: Royal Blue, White
- General manager: Bobby Raine
- Head coach: Jordan Fuller
- Asst. coaches: Lucas Mastroianni; Kody Tremblay
- Captain: Mavin Smith
- Media: https://www.instagram.com/dorchesterdolphinshockey/#
- Website: https://dorchesterdolphins.pjhlon.hockeytech.com/

Championships
- Regular season titles: 2015-2016, 2016-2017, 2018-2019
- Division titles: 2013-2014, 2015-2016, 2016-2017

Current uniform
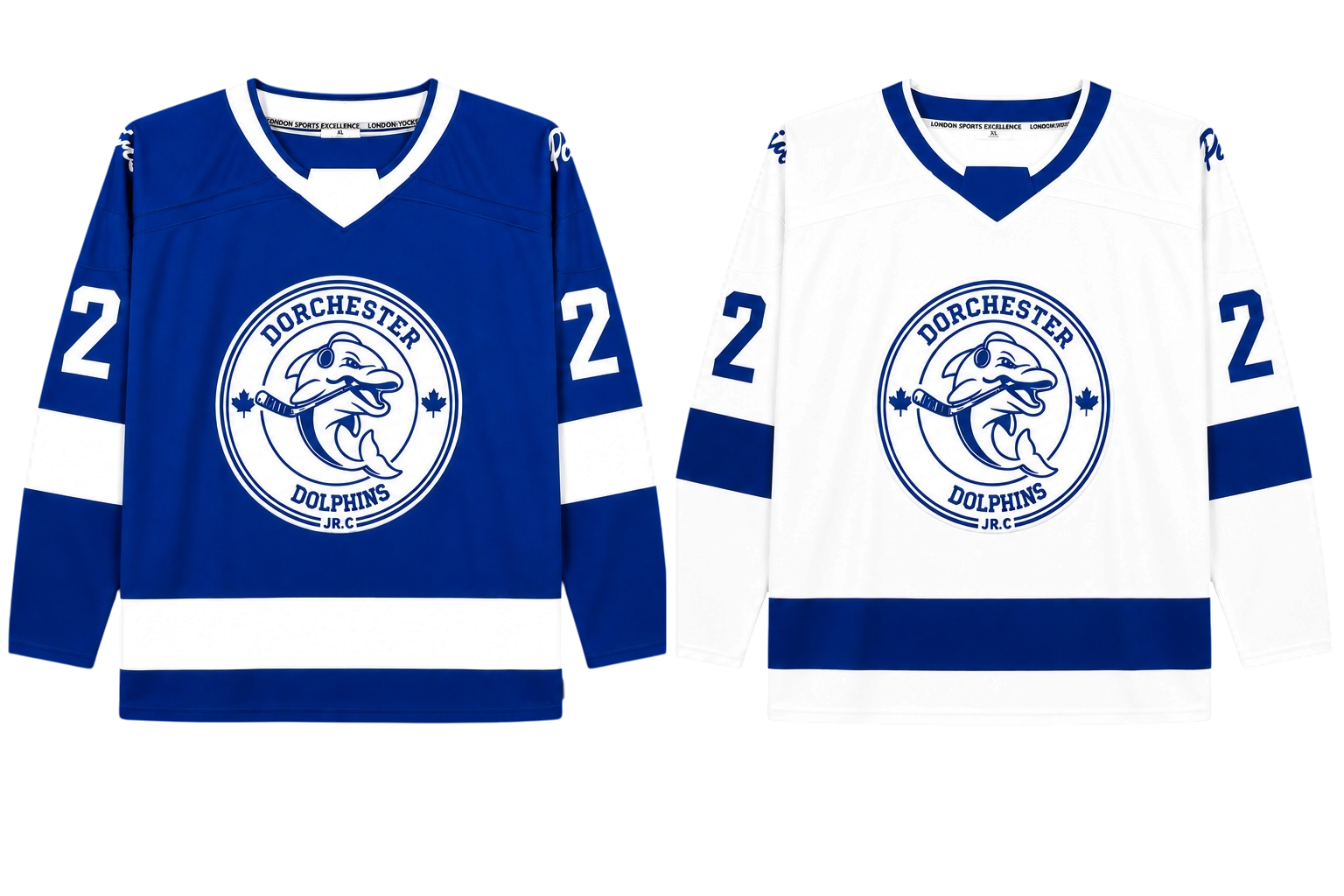

The Dorchester Dolphins are a Canadian junior ice hockey team based in Dorchester, Ontario, Canada. They play in the Provincial Junior Hockey League.

== History ==
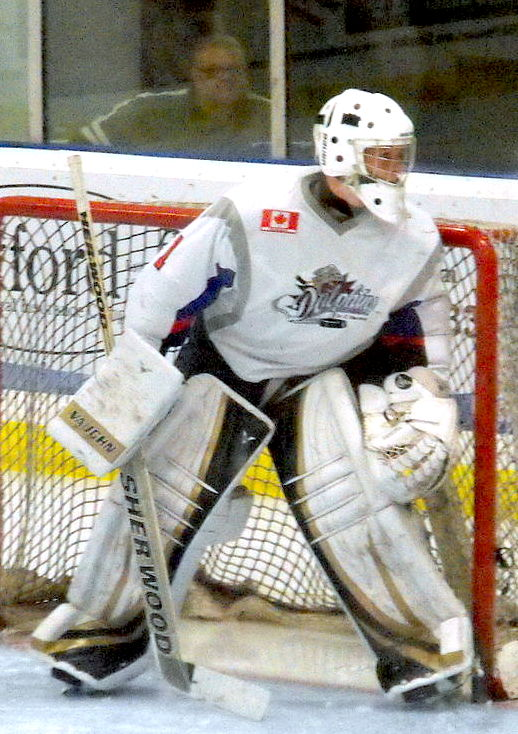
Dolphins goalie watches puck behind the net early in the 2013–14 season.

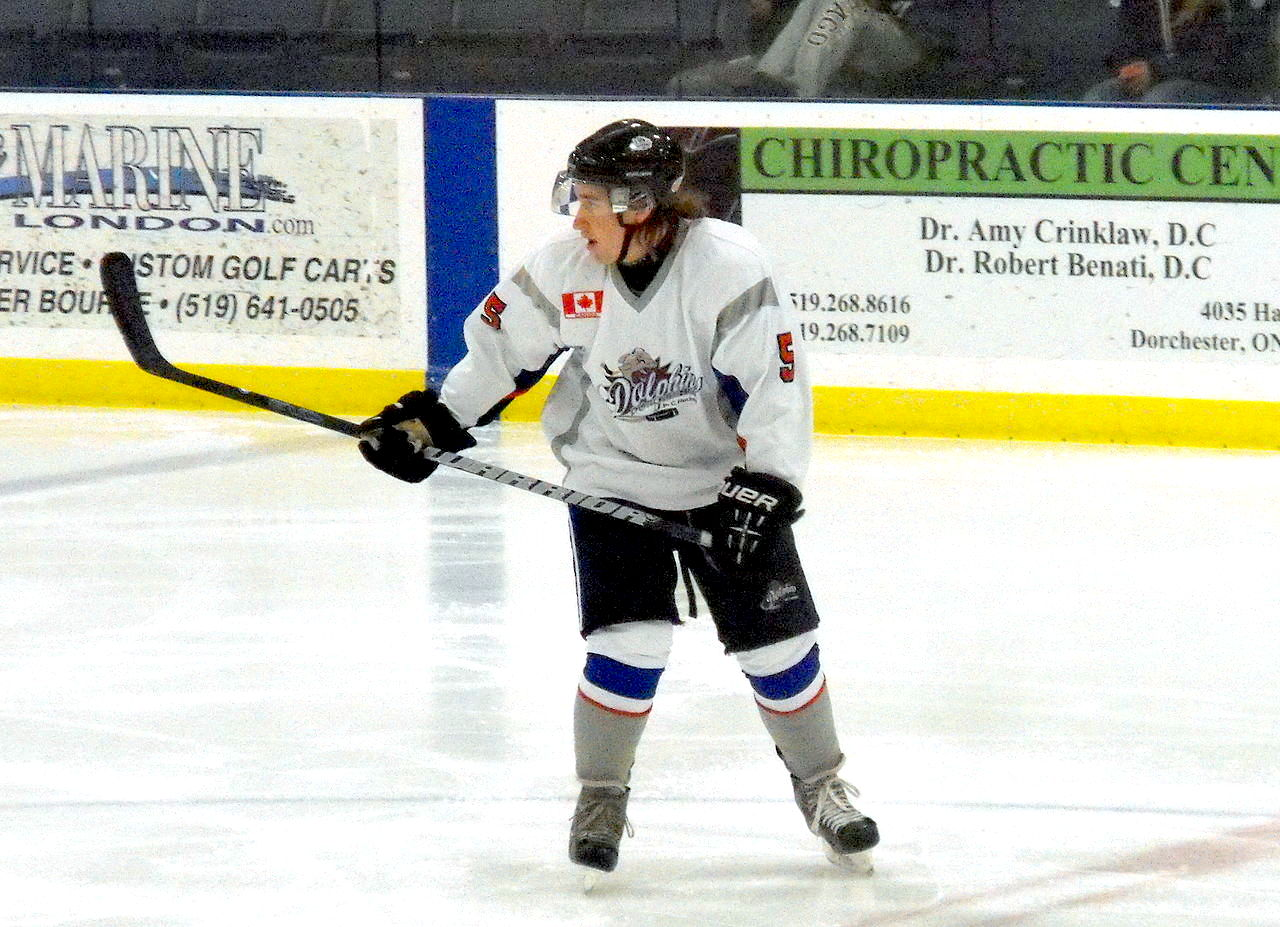
Dolphins Defenseman comes back to block rush early in the 2013–14 season.

The Dolphins are the namesake of the town's long running tradition in intermediate and senior hockey.

The Dolphins played their first ever hockey game on September 14, 2012, at home against the Lucan Irish. The Dolphins were victorious, 6–5. Brendon O'Shaughnessy scored both the first and second goals in team history for the Dolphins against the Irish and Alex Hutcheson made 31 saves on 36 shots to pick up the first ever win.

The Dolphins would finish their first ever season in second place in their division and lose in the seventh game of the division final against the Lambeth Lancers to finish their season.

During the 2013–14 season, the Dolphins would finish third in a three-way footrace for the regular season championship. The lack of a season banner did not deter them in the playoffs as they would beat both the Lambeth Lancers and Thamesford Trojans (the two teams who outpointed them) in the playoff's final two rounds to take home their first even SOJHL playoff championship. By winning the title, the Dolphins also earned the league's second ever berth into the Clarence Schmalz Cup playdowns (Ayr Centennials being the first in 2013). On March 21, 2014, in the second game of their quarter-final series against the Great Lakes Junior C Hockey League's Essex 73's, the Dolphins became the first SOJHL team to win a Junior C playoff game against a team from another league with a 6–5 overtime victory at home.

The 2016–17 season marked an historic run for the dolphins who finished the regular season undefeated with one tie, missing the perfect season by one point. This regular season record brings them to a tie with Belle River who also had the same record, as the best season in Jr. C.

Prior to the 2024–25 season the PJHL re-organized teams. As a result, the Dolphins were moved to the South Conference and assigned to the Doherty Division.

During the 2026 off-season, the Dolphins underwent a rebrand moving away from the logo that has been there since the team's inception and transitioning to a new look of just royal blue and white that tips a cap to the previous Dolphins of the Sr. A days.

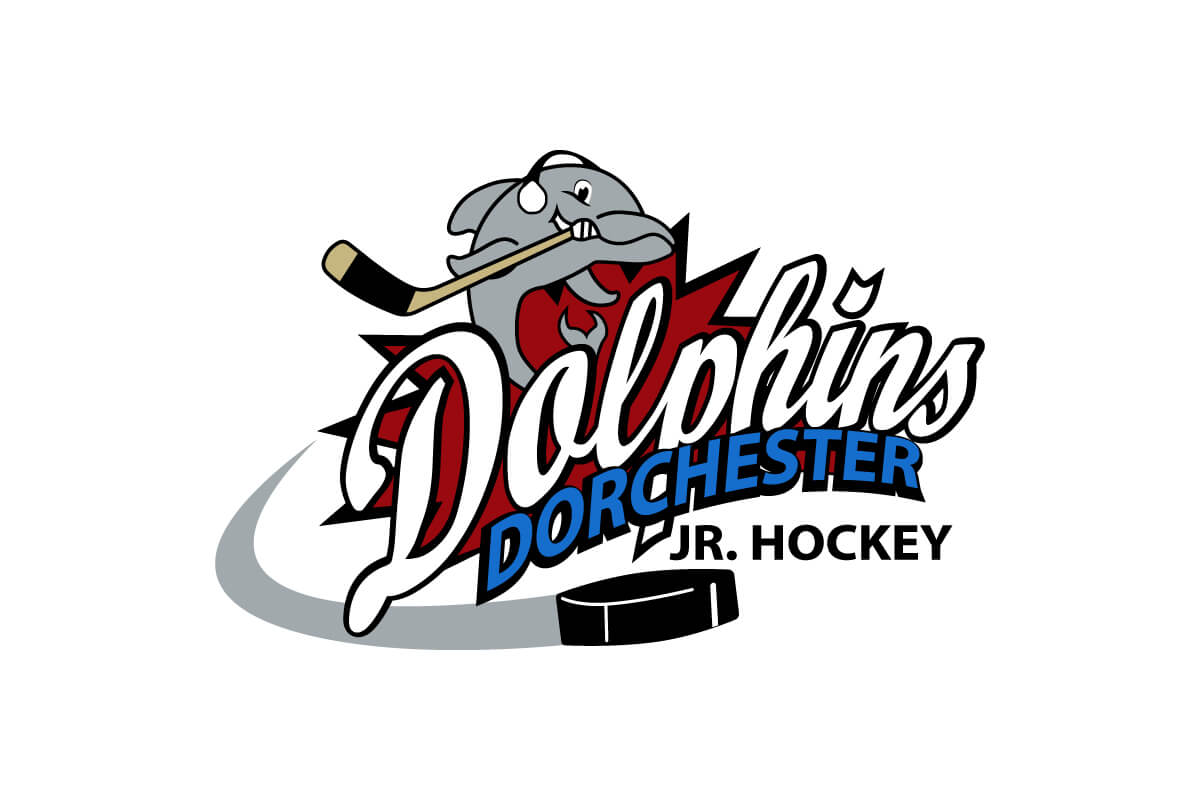
Dorchester Dolphins Logo from 2012-2026

== Season-by-season standings ==
| Season | GP | W | L | T | OTL | GF | GA | P | Results | Playoffs |
| 2012-13 | 37 | 28 | 5 | - | 4 | 177 | 107 | 60 | 2nd SOJHL-Yk | Lost Conf. Final |
| 2013-14 | 40 | 28 | 9 | - | 3 | 210 | 98 | 59 | 3rd SOJHL | Won League, Lost CSC QF |
| 2014-15 | 40 | 25 | 14 | - | 1 | 209 | 153 | 51 | 5th SOJHL | Won Quarter - 4-1 - (Irish); Won Semi's - 4-1 - (Lancers); Lost League Finals - 0-4 - (Hawks) |
| 2015-16 | 40 | 35 | 5 | 0 | - | 284 | 98 | 70 | 1st of 9 SOJHL | Won Quarter - 4-0 - (Lancers); Won Semifinals - 4-0 - (Bulldogs); Won League Finals - 4-3 (Hawks); Lost CSC Quarterfinals 0-4 (Essex) |
| 2016-17 | 40 | 39 | 0 | 1 | - | 246 | 84 | 79 | 1st of 9 Yeck Div - PJHL | Won Div. Quarter, 4-1 (Stars); Won Div. Semifinals 4-0 (Lancers); Won Div Final, 4-3 (Spitfires); Lost Conf. Finals, 1-4 (Essex) |
| 2017-18 | 40 | 27 | 11 | 0 | 2 | 173 | 009 | 56 | 3rd of 9 Yeck Div - PJHL | Won Div. Quarter, 4-1 (Bulldogs); Won Div. Semifinals 4-0 (Hawks); Lost Div. Finals, 1-4 (Lancers) |
| 2018-19 | 40 | 31 | 9 | 0 | 0 | 197 | 115 | 62 | 1st of 9 Yeck Div - PJHL | Won Div. Quarter, 4-1 (Bulldogs); Won Div. Semifinals 4-0 (Trojans); Lost Div. Finals, 1-4 (Hawks) |
| 2019-20 | 42 | 28 | 14 | 0 | 0 | 208 | 118 | 56 | 4th of 8 Yeck Div - PJHL | Won Div. Quarter, 4-0 (Stars); Lost Div. Semifinals 1-4 (Trojans) |
| 2020-21 | Season Lost due to COVID-19 pandemic | | | | | | | | | |
| 2021-22 | 30 | 16 | 11 | 2 | 1 | 109 | 102 | 35 | 4th of 7 Yeck Div - PJHL | Won Div. Quarter, 4-2 (Trojans); Won Div Semi 4-3 (Hawks); Lost Div Finals 0-4 (Stars) |
| 2022-23 | 39 | 20 | 15 | 3 | 1 | 148 | 135 | 44 | 5th of 9 Yeck Div - PJHL | Lost Div. Quarter, 2-4 (Hawks) |
| 2023-24 | 40 | 26 | 9 | 4 | 1 | 159 | 116 | 57 | 4h of 9 Yeck Div - PJHL | Lost Div. Quarter, 3-4 (Hawks) |
| 2024-25 | 42 | 19 | 19 | 2 | 2 | 119 | 133 | 42 | 5th of 8 Doherty; 10th of 16 South Conf; 39th of 63 - PJHL | Lost Div. Quarter, 0-4 (Applejacks) |
| 2025-26 | 42 | 10 | 26 | 4 | 2 | 129 | 182 | 26 | 8th of 8 Doherty; 15th of 16 South Conf; 54th of 61 - PJHL | Lost Div. Quarter, 0-4 (Navy Vets) |

== Season-by-season Breakdown ==
=== 2012–13 Season Recap ===
- Regular Season: 28-5-4 (2nd in SOJHL Yeck Division)
- Playoffs: Quarterfinal vs Mt. Brydges (4-1 W) After a surprising 2–0 loss at home to open the series, Dorchester responded emphatically, winning four straight. The Game 2 shootout (8–5) sparked the offense, and the team outscored Mt. Brydges 22–9 in the final four games, including a 4–0 shutout in Game 4. Semifinal vs Port Stanley (4-0 W) A clinical sweep. Dorchester dominated every game, outscoring the Sailors 23–5. The defense was airtight and goaltending near flawless in Games 1 and 4. Final vs Lambeth (3-4 L) This series was a heavyweight clash. Dorchester dropped Game 1 in a close battle, then erupted for back-to-back wins in Games 2 and 3. However, Lambeth took Games 4 and 5 (the latter in OT), putting Dorchester on the ropes. The Dolphins forced Game 7 with a 6–4 win, but fell just short in a thrilling 4–3 finale.

Summary: A season that ended one goal shy of a title. The Dolphins battled through 18 playoff games, showcasing depth and resilience.

=== 2013–14 Season Recap ===
- Regular Season: 28-9-3 (3rd in SOJHL)
- Playoffs: Quarterfinal vs Aylmer (4-0 W) Dorchester took care of business with a balanced effort. They won two tight road games and controlled play at home, closing out Aylmer with consistent defensive play. Semifinal vs Thamesford (4-0 W) The Dolphins were explosive, especially in Games 3 and 4 (combined 15 goals). Game 4 was a wild 8–7 OT win that saw Dorchester erase multiple deficits. Final vs Lambeth (4-0 W) A dominant statement. Each win was by at least two goals. Lambeth couldn't match Dorchester's offensive rhythm or physical pace. CSC Quarterfinal vs Essex (3-4 L) Dorchester started flat in Game 1 (0–7), but rebounded with OT wins in Games 2 and 4. A stunning 11–3 loss in Game 5 was a blow, but the Dolphins answered again in Game 6. Ultimately, Essex flexed its depth in Game 7, ending Dorchester's run.

Summary: Three straight playoff sweeps captured the SOJHL title in spectacular fashion. The Dolphins pushed provincial powerhouse Essex to the limit in the CSC but fell in Game 7.

=== 2014–15 Season Recap ===
- Regular Season: 25-14-1 (5th in SOJHL)
- Playoffs: Quarterfinal vs Lucan (4-1 W) After a humbling 9–3 loss to start the series, Dorchester roared back with four straight wins, including a tight OT victory in Game 4. Semifinal vs Lambeth (4-1 W) Dorchester won the first two and responded strongly after an 8–2 loss in Game 3. They closed out the series with back-to-back multi-goal wins. Final vs Exeter (0-4 L) The magic ran out as Exeter overwhelmed Dorchester. After a heartbreaking OT loss in Game 1, the series turned into a rout — Exeter outscored Dorchester 34–9 over the next three games, including a 9–1 blowout.

Summary: A strong playoff effort and back-to-back series wins couldn't overcome a juggernaut Exeter team in the final. Still, Dorchester showed they could punch above their seed.

=== 2015–16 Season Recap ===
- Regular Season: 35-5-0 (1st in SOJHL, 9 teams)
- Playoffs: Quarterfinal vs Lambeth (4-0 W) Dorchester rolled through the Lancers in dominant fashion, scoring a staggering 35 goals in four games. Highlighted by a 10–3 road win and a 10–6 barnburner at home, this series was never in doubt. Semifinal vs Mt. Brydges (4-0 W) The Bulldogs put up more of a fight, but the Dolphins proved too deep. Three of the four games were decided by just one or two goals, including a clutch 4–3 OT win in Game 4 to complete the sweep. Final vs Exeter (4-3 W) An absolute classic of a series. After dropping Game 1 6–2, Dorchester responded with three straight wins, including a tight 3–2 battle in Game 3 and a 6–4 win in Game 4. Exeter stormed back with emphatic wins in Games 5 (5–2) and 6 (9–1), forcing a dramatic Game 7. In front of a home crowd, Dorchester slammed the door with a 4–0 shutout to claim the league title. CSC Quarterfinal vs Essex (0-4 L) The momentum ran out at the provincial stage. Dorchester couldn't get traction against perennial powerhouse Essex, getting swept while being outscored 24–3. A tough ending to an otherwise magical season.

Summary: One of the most dominant and memorable runs in franchise history. A 70-point regular season, back-to-back sweeps, and a gritty seven-game final cemented this team's legacy — even if the Schmaltz Cup journey ended early.

=== 2016–17 Season Recap ===
- Regular Season: 39-0-1 (1st in PJHL Yeck Division – 9 teams)
- Playoffs: Quarterfinal vs North Middlesex (4-1 W) The undefeated Dolphins started playoffs with a convincing series win over the Stars. A minor hiccup in Game 4 (a 3–2 loss) was the only blemish, but Dorchester responded decisively in Game 5 to close it out. Semifinal vs Lambeth (4-0 W) Dorchester returned to form with a sweep, dominating in every facet. They allowed just eight total goals, including a 6–0 shutout in Game 3. Offense rolled with 24 goals in four games. Final vs Aylmer (4-3 W) One of the tightest series of the era. The Dolphins and Spitfires traded wins all the way to Game 7. After a 5–4 loss in Game 6, Dorchester slammed the door with a 5–0 shutout in the decisive game, showing big-game poise when it mattered most. Schmaltz Cup Quarterfinal vs Essex (1-4 L) The Dolphins were tested heavily by the battle-hardened 73's. Despite a Game 3 win at home (4–3), Dorchester was outgunned in the other four, including a 4–1 loss in the series finale.

Summary: A near-perfect regular season — undefeated in regulation — capped by a dramatic league championship. While the Schmaltz Cup run fell short, this team's consistency, depth, and resilience made it one of the most formidable rosters in team history.

=== 2017–18 Season Recap ===
- Regular Season: 27-11-2 (3rd in PJHL Yeck Division)
- Playoffs: Quarterfinal vs Mt. Brydges (4-1 W) Dorchester's offense was on full display, racking up 30 goals over the five-game set. A hiccup in Game 3 (a 5–4 OT loss) kept the series from being a sweep, but the Dolphins responded with a commanding 9–5 win in Game 5. Semifinal vs Exeter (4-0 W) A mature, disciplined sweep. Dorchester controlled all four games, capped by back-to-back shutouts in Games 3 and 4. The blueline was rock solid, and goaltending was lights out. Final vs Lambeth (1-4 L) The Dolphins never quite found their rhythm against a strong Lambeth squad. After dropping the first two games, they answered in Game 3 with a 5–2 win, but fell hard in the next two, including a 5–0 shutout to end the series.

Summary: Another strong playoff showing, with 8 wins in the first 9 games. A return to the final was well earned, but the team came up short against a physical and opportunistic Lambeth side.

=== 2018–19 Season Recap ===
- Regular Season: 31-9-0 (1st in PJHL Yeck Division)
- Playoffs: Quarterfinal vs Mt. Brydges (4-1 W) Dorchester struck first and never really looked back. Despite a Game 4 OT loss, the Dolphins outscored the Bulldogs 24–12 overall, including a pair of six-goal games. Semifinal vs Thamesford (4-0 W) A clinical sweep. Dorchester allowed just four total goals over four games and blanked the Trojans twice. Their defensive structure looked playoff-tested. Final vs Exeter (1-4 L) This one stung. Dorchester lost a 5–4 heartbreaker in Game 1, then fell in OT again in Game 2. A 7–1 blowout win in Game 3 seemed to turn the tide, but the Dolphins were shut down in Games 4 and 5.

Summary: A Presidents’ Trophy season that looked poised for a deeper run. Despite 8 dominant wins to start the postseason, Exeter slammed the door in the final — again.

=== 2019–20 Season Recap ===
- Regular Season: 28-14-0 (4th in PJHL Yeck Division)
- Playoffs: Quarterfinal vs North Middlesex (4-0 W) A confident sweep. Dorchester limited the Stars to just 7 total goals and rolled to multi-goal wins in every game. Their special teams and forecheck were sharp. Semifinal vs Thamesford (1-4 L) Dorchester stole Game 2 with a 5–2 win, but it was all Trojans from there. Three straight losses to close the series, including a 7–4 shootout in Game 3 and a 2–0 shutdown in Game 5.

Summary: Another promising start undone by inconsistency against a grinding, opportunistic Thamesford squad. Still, Dorchester notched another playoff sweep and valuable postseason experience.

=== 20–21 Season Recap ===
- Regular Season: Canceled due to COVID-19

Summary: A lost season during the pandemic halted momentum. No games were played.

=== 2021–22 Season Recap ===
- Regular Season: 16-11-2-1 (4th in PJHL Yeck Division)
- Playoffs: Quarterfinal vs Thamesford (4-2 W) Tight, physical series. Four of the six games were decided by one goal. Dorchester grabbed early wins, dropped three straight, then responded under pressure with a 3–2 road win in Game 6 to advance. Semifinal vs Exeter (4-3 W) This one was a war. Dorchester won Games 1, 2, and 4 — Exeter answered with 6–4 and 3–2 wins to force a Game 7. In front of a loud home crowd, the Dolphins delivered a 2–0 shutout to punch their ticket to the finals. Final vs North Middlesex (0-4 L) The run ended abruptly as Dorchester was swept by the Stars. A 3–0 loss in Game 2 was particularly deflating. They battled hard but couldn't break through offensively.

Summary: A thrilling playoff ride with a pair of Game 7s and gutsy performances. While the final series was one-sided, Dorchester showed grit and tenacity.

=== 2022–23 Season Recap ===
- Regular Season: 20-15-3-1 (5th in PJHL Yeck Division)
- Playoffs: Quarterfinal vs Exeter (2-4 L) A frustrating exit in a series that could’ve gone either way. Dorchester delivered a 9–0 beatdown in Game 2 and a solid win in Game 5, but dropped three one-goal games — including an OT loss in the finale.

Summary: Competitive, but snakebitten. The Dolphins proved they could dominate on any given night, but inconsistency and close-game woes were the story.

=== 2023–24 Season Recap ===
- Regular Season: 26-9-4-1 (4th in PJHL Yeck Division)
- Playoffs: Quarterfinal vs Exeter (3-4 L) Dorchester led the series 3–1 after four games — including a shutout in Game 3 and a gutsy OT win in Game 4. But the Dolphins couldn't close it out, dropping three straight including back-to-back one-goal heartbreakers in Games 6 and 7.

Summary: One that got away. A 3–1 series lead slipped through their hands as Exeter mounted a stunning comeback. Dorchester played well enough to win the series — but couldn't finish.

=== 2024–25 Season Recap ===
- Regular Season: 19-19-2-2 (5th in Doherty Division, 10th in South Conference)
- Playoffs: Quarterfinal vs Wellesley (0-4 L) A tough matchup against a top-seeded Wellesley squad. Dorchester competed hard in Games 2 and 4, but couldn't generate enough offense — just five total goals across four games. The OT loss in Game 4 ended the season.

Summary: A transition year in a new division, capped by a quick playoff exit. The Dolphins had flashes of potential but couldn't match the intensity of a deep Applejacks team.

== Current Team ==
=== Current roster ===
Updated 7 July 2025.

| No. | Nat | Player | Pos | S/G | Age | Acquired | Birthplace |
|---|---|---|---|---|---|---|---|
| 7 | (Canada) | Liam Brulotte | F | L | 20 | 2023 | Dorchester, Ontario |
| 8 | (Canada) | Jarrett Humphries (A) | F | R | 22 | 2021 | London, Ontario |
| 9 | (Canada) | Lucas Wilson | F | L | 20 | 2023 | Dorchester, Ontario |
| 10 | (Canada) | David Johnston | F | L | 20 | 2022 | Dorchester, Ontario |
| 16 | (Canada) | Owen Stoddard | F | R | 20 | 2024 | Fort Erie, Ontario |
| 12 | (Canada) | Damian Pancino | F | R | 22 | 2025 | London, Ontario |
| 18 | (Canada) | Cooper Kilbourne | F | L | 21 | 2022 | London, Ontario |
| 20 | (Canada) | Cole Shoup | F | R | 18 | 2024 | Springfield, Ontario |
| 30 | (Canada) | Sam Willsie | F | L | 19 | 2024 | Dorchester, Ontario |
| 22 | (Canada) | Nolan Candy | F | L | 20 | 2024 | Dorchester, Ontario |
| 4 | (Canada) | TJ Cleminson | D | L | 19 | 2024 | Kitchener, Ontario |
| 5 | (Canada) | Matt Sturgeon (A) | D | L | 22 | 2023 | London, Ontario |
| 15 | (Canada) | Cody Torraville | D | L | 20 | 2024 | Erin, Ontario |
| 26 | (Canada) | Wyatt Adkins | D | L | 22 | 2024 | Ingersoll, Ontario |
| 27 | (Canada) | Mavin Smith (C) | D | L | 19 | 2023 | Dorchester, Ontario |
| 1 | (Canada) | Jeremy Hardeman | G | L | 21 | 2024 | Dorchester, Ontario |

=== Staff ===
Updated February 27, 2019

| Title | Staff Member |
|---|---|
| General Manager | Bobby Raine |
| Head Coach | Jordan Fuller |
| Assistant Coach | Kody Tremblay |
| Assistant Coach | Lucas Mastroianni |
| Goalie Coach | Connor Latchford |
| Trainer | Mark Somers |
| Equipment Manager | Curtis Gartly |
