= Midwestern Junior C Hockey League =

Midwestern Junior C Hockey League
Head Office	Cambridge, Ontario
Official Website	MWJCHL
Operated	2013-2016
League Convenor	Bob Zehr

The Midwestern Junior C Hockey League (MWJCHL) was a Canadian Junior ice hockey league in Southwestern Ontario. The MWJCHL was a member of the Ontario Hockey Association and Hockey Canada. Its champion competed for the Clarence Schmalz Cup, the OHA Junior C championship.

In the summer of 2016, the MWJCHL joined the Provincial Junior Hockey League.

== History ==
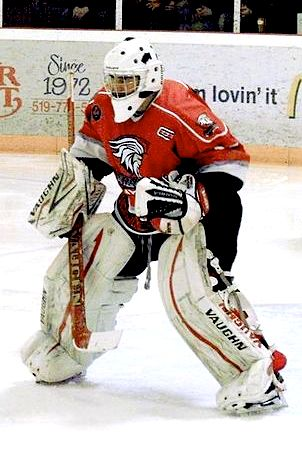
Centennials' goaltender during 2013 Clarence Schmalz Cup playoffs.

The Midwestern Junior C Hockey League formed in the summer of 2013 due to the realignment of the severely overlapping Southern Ontario Junior Hockey League and Niagara & District Junior C Hockey League. Originally the NDJCHL was going to proceed with 18 teams, but the decision was made to divide the league into two leagues based on divisional lines. The MWJCHL was what was to be the Western Division of the NDJCHL in 2013–14. Of the nine current members of the league, in 2012-13 the Ayr Centennials, Burford Bulldogs, Delhi Travellers, Tavistock Braves, and Wellesley Applejacks were all members of the Southern Ontario Junior Hockey League, while the New Hamburg Firebirds, Norwich Merchants, Paris Mounties, and Woodstock Navy-Vets came from the Niagara League.

On September 13, 2013, the Wellesley Applejacks traveled to New Hamburg, Ontario to face the New Hamburg Firebirds in the first game in MWJCHL history. New Hamburg's Matt Yantzi scored 2:19 into the first period to tally the league's first ever goal. The Applejacks would win the game 6–3, with their own Taylor Doering scoring the league's first ever game-winning-goal and Josh Heer making 32 saves for the first ever victory.

On March 13, 2014, regular season champion Paris Mounties defeated 2nd place Ayr Centennials to win the first MWJCHL championship.

== The teams ==
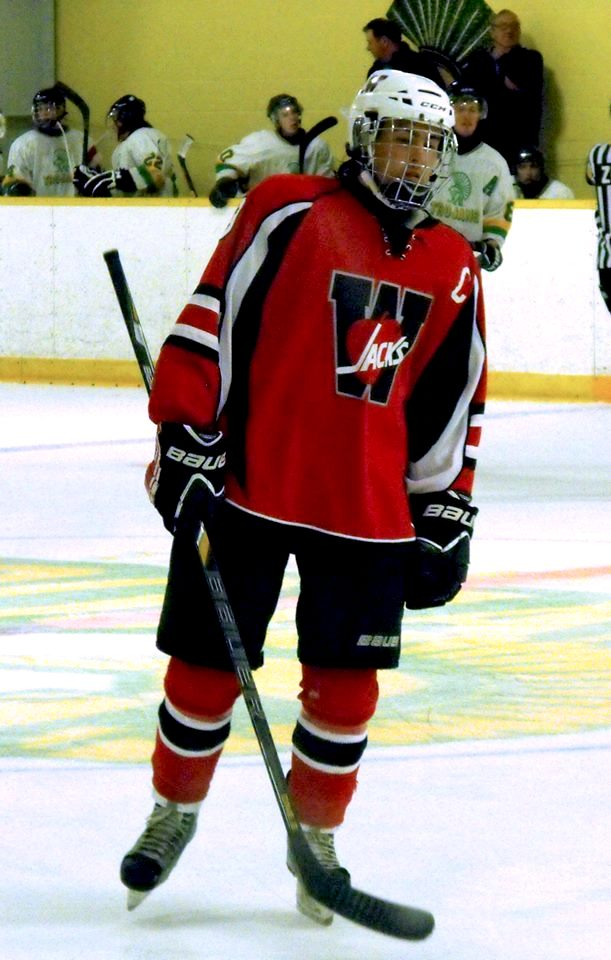
Wellesley Applejacks player in 2014.

Team	Centre	Founded
Ayr Centennials	Ayr	1983
Burford Bulldogs	Burford	1988
Delhi Travellers	Delhi	1967
New Hamburg Firebirds	New Hamburg	1953
Norwich Merchants	Norwich	1968
Paris Mounties	Paris	1985
Tavistock Braves	Tavistock	1970
Wellesley Applejacks	Wellesley	1987
Woodstock Navy-Vets	Woodstock	1966

== 2015-16 Playoffs ==
Winner moves on to the Clarence Schmalz Cup.

Quarter-final
1	Ayr	4
8	Burford	1
4	Wellesley	4
5	Tavistock	1
2	New Hamburg	4
7	Norwich	0
3	Paris	4
6	Woodstock	2

Semi-final
1	Ayr	4
4	Wellesley	0
2	New Hamburg	4
3	Paris	1

Final
1	Ayr	4
2	New Hamburg	1

== Champions ==
Year	Champions	Finalists	Result in Provincials
2014	Paris Mounties	Ayr Centennials	Lost QF to Grimsby (ND)
2015	Ayr Centennials	Norwich Merchants	Lost SF to Essex 73's (GL)
2016	Ayr Centennials	New Hamburg Firebirds	Won CSC vs. Port Hope (Emp)

== Regular Season Champions ==
Season	Champion	Record	Points
2013-14	Paris Mounties	32-6-0-2	66
2014-15	Ayr Centennials	32-8-0-0	64
2015-16	Ayr Centennials	33-6-1-0	67
