= Paris Mounties =

Canadian junior ice hockey team

- City: Paris, Ontario
- League: Provincial Junior Hockey League
- Conference: Central
- Division: Pat Doherty
- Founded: 1985
- Home arena: Brant Sports Complex
- Colours: Red, Black, Gold, & White
- Owner: Mike Christian
- General manager: Richard Towle (2024)
- Head coach: Dave Ferris (2025)
- Affiliates: Ayr Centennials
- Website: Official website

Franchise history
- 1985–2023: Paris Mounties; 2023–2026: Paris Titans; 2026–present: Paris Mounties

The Paris Mounties are a junior hockey team based in Paris, Ontario, Canada. The team was founded in 1985 as the Paris Mounties, they were members of the Midwestern Junior C Hockey League of the Ontario Hockey Association until the 2016–17 season when it became the Pat Dougherty Division of the Central Conference of the Provincial Junior Hockey League. In 2023, follow a sale of the team, they were renamed the Titans.

== History ==
The Mounties came about in the wake of the folding of the Intermediate "B" Paris '29ers.

After twenty-one seasons in the Niagara & District Junior C Hockey League, the Ontario Hockey Association realigned and they were placed in the Midwestern Junior C Hockey League.

Summer of 2016 the eight junior "C" hockey leagues in Southern Ontario amalgamated into a single Provincial Junior Hockey League with the individual leagues becoming divisions. The Midwestern Junior league re-branded to the Pat Doherty Division.

The playoffs for the 2019–20 season were cancelled due to the COVID-19 pandemic, leading to the team not being able to play a single game.

During the 2023 off-season, the franchise was sold to new owners and the team was re-branded as the Paris Titans. In April 2026, the team announced they will returning to the Mounties name.

== Season-by-season record ==
Note: GP = Games Played, W = Wins, L = Losses, T = Ties, OTL = Overtime Losses, GF = Goals for, GA = Goals against

Season	GP	W	L	T	OTL	GF	GA	Points	Finish	Playoffs
1985-86	36	20	11	5	-	--	--	45	3rd NJC-W	
1986-87	34	13	16	5	-	--	--	31	4th NJC-W	
1987-88	Did Not Participate									
1988-89	35	26	5	4	-	245	152	56	2nd WJDHL	
1989-90	35	21	9	5	-	215	142	47	5th WJDHL	
1990-91	39	19	17	2	1	239	222	41	8th WJDHL	
1991-92	34	18	12	3	1	178	186	40	6th OHAJDL	
1992-93	36	22	10	4	-	208	165	48	2nd NJC-W	
1993-94	36	25	5	6	-	268	138	56	1st NJC-W	
1994-95	36	24	9	3	-	233	135	51	2nd NJC-W	
1995-96	40	22	10	8	-	251	164	52	3rd NJC-W	Won League; Won CSC
1996-97	40	30	7	3	0	231	115	63	2nd NJC-W	
1997-98	39	31	5	3	0	238	132	65	1st NJC-W	
1998-99	34	16	17	-	1	--	--	33	4th NJCHL-W	
1999-00	36	4	30	-	2	--	--	10	5th NJCHL-W	DNQ
2000-01	36	12	21	1	2	--	--	27	5th NJCHL-W	DNQ
2001-02	36	8	23	3	2	--	--	21	5th NJCHL-W	DNQ
2002-03	36	6	24	2	4	106	165	18	11th NJCHL	DNQ
2003-04	36	9	21	2	4	124	167	24	10th NJCHL	DNQ
2004-05	36	12	20	1	3	101	118	28	10th NJCHL	DNQ
2005-06	36	10	23	2	1	98	186	23	11th NJCHL	DNQ
2006-07	36	0	34	1	1	84	284	2	12th NJCHL	DNQ
2007-08	36	3	29	1	3	86	238	10	11th NJCHL	Lost Preliminary Round 0-4 (Storm)
2008-09	36	9	23	-	4	101	182	22	11th NJCHL	DNQ
2009-10	36	10	23	-	3	126	174	23	11th NJCHL	Lost quarter-final 0-4 (Merchants)
2010-11	36	10	23	-	3	121	168	23	9th NJCHL	Lost Div quarter-final 2-4 (Spitfires)
2011-12	36	13	23	-	0	143	186	26	10th NJCHL	Lost Div quarter-final 2-4 (Merchants)
2012-13	38	18	16	-	4	130	159	40	3rd NJC-W	Won Div quarter-final 4-0 (Navy-Vets); Lost div. semi-final 1-4 (Merchants)
2013-14	40	32	6	-	2	181	106	66	1st MWJCHL	Won quarter-final 4-1 (Travellers); Won semi-final 4-0 (Merchants); Won League 4-2 (Centennials); Lost CSC QF 0-4 (Peach Kings)
2014-15	40	22	18	0	-	160	120	44	4th MWJCHL	Won quarter-final 4-3 (Navy-Vets); Lost semi-final 0-4 (Centennials)
2015-16	40	25	15	0	-	187	135	50	3rd of 9 MWJCHL	Won quarter-final 4-2 (Navy-Vets); Lost semi-final 1-4 (Firebirds)
2016-17	40	27	12	1	-	184	123	55	2nd of 9 - PJHL; Dougherty Div	Won Div quarter-final 4-3 (Braves); Won Div. semi-final 4-2 (Applejacks); Lost DivFinals, 0-4 (Centennials)
2017-18	40	26	12	0	2	210	125	54	4th of 9 - PJHL; Dougherty Div	Won Div quarter-final 4-0 (Applejacks); Lost div semi-final 3-4 (Centennials)
2018-19	40	24	11	3	2	169	94	53	4th of 9 - PJHL; Dougherty Div	Won Div quarter-final 4-2 (Merchants); Lost div semi-final 3-4 (Braves)
2019-20	40	22	15	2	1	155	94	47	5th of 9 - PJHL; Dougherty Div	Lost Div quarter-final 3-4 (Navy-Vets)
2020-21	Season Lost due to COVID-19 pandemic									
2021-22	Inactive this season									
2022-23	41	5	32	2	2	88	202	14	6th of 7- PJHL; Dougherty Div	lost Div quarter-final 1-4 (Merchants)
PARIS TITANS
2023-24	42	8	31	2	1	97	193	19	7th of 7- PJHL; Dougherty Div	Lost Div quarter-final 1-4 (Navy-Vets)
2024-25	42	13	25	3	1	120	158	30	6th of 8 Dougherty; 11th of 16 South Conf; 44th of 63 - PJHL	Lost Div quarter-final 1-4 (Navy-Vets)
2025-26	42	13	26	3	0	148	198	29	7th of 8 Dougherty; 14th of 16 South Conf; 47th of 61 - PJHL	Lost Div quarter-final 0-4 (Braves)

== Clarence Schmalz Cup appearances ==
1996: Paris Mounties defeated Napanee Raiders 4-games-to-1
