= Wellesley Applejacks =

Canadian junior ice hockey team

Wellesley Apple Jacks
- City: Wellesley, Ontario
- League: Provincial Junior Hockey League
- Conference: South
- Division: Doherty
- Founded: 1987
- Home arena: Wellesley Arena
- Colours: Black, Red, White
- Head coach: Derek Lebold
- Affiliate: Elmira Sugar Kings (GOJHL)

Championships
- League champions: 1998, 2023
- OHA Cups: 1998

The Wellesley Apple Jacks are a Canadian Junior ice hockey team based in Wellesley, Ontario. They play in the Provincial Junior Hockey League of the Ontario Hockey Association.

== History ==
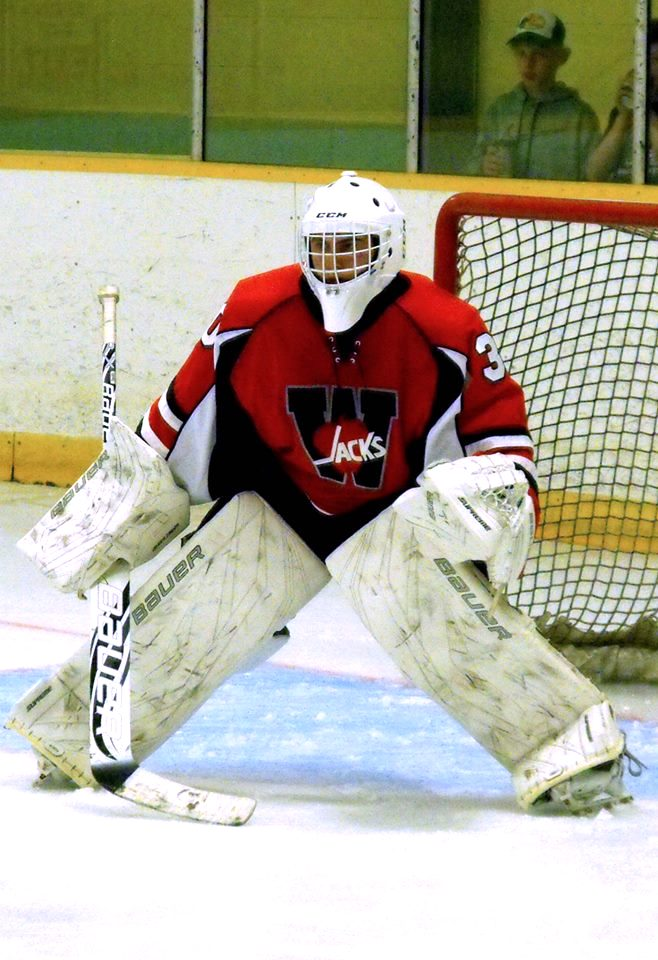
Goalie Jesse Bender in 2014.

The Wellesley Apple Jacks joined the Western Junior D Hockey League in 1987. A year later, the Western League absorbed the Southern Junior D Hockey League. They operated under the Western moniker for three more years.

In 1991, the Western League was dissolved and the OHA Junior Development League was created. At this time, the Apple Jacks turned into a team to reckon with.

In the early years of the OHAJDL, the league was dominated by the Thamesford Trojans and Lucan Irish, but come the 1995–96 season the Apple Jacks made their first finals appearance of what would be four consecutive years.

In the 1996 OHA Cup Finals, the Apple Jacks fell to the Exeter Hawks 4-games-to-3. This came after finishing 2nd place in the entire league with 27 wins.

The 1996–97 season had the Apple Jacks finish second again with 28 wins, but lose in the OHA Cup final 4-games-to-none to the Mount Brydges Bulldogs.

The 1997–98 season was one for the ages for the Apple Jacks. They finished first in the OHAJDL with 28 wins and made it all the way to the league final for the third straight year. They defeated the Exeter Hawks 4-games-to-3 to win their first OHA Cup.

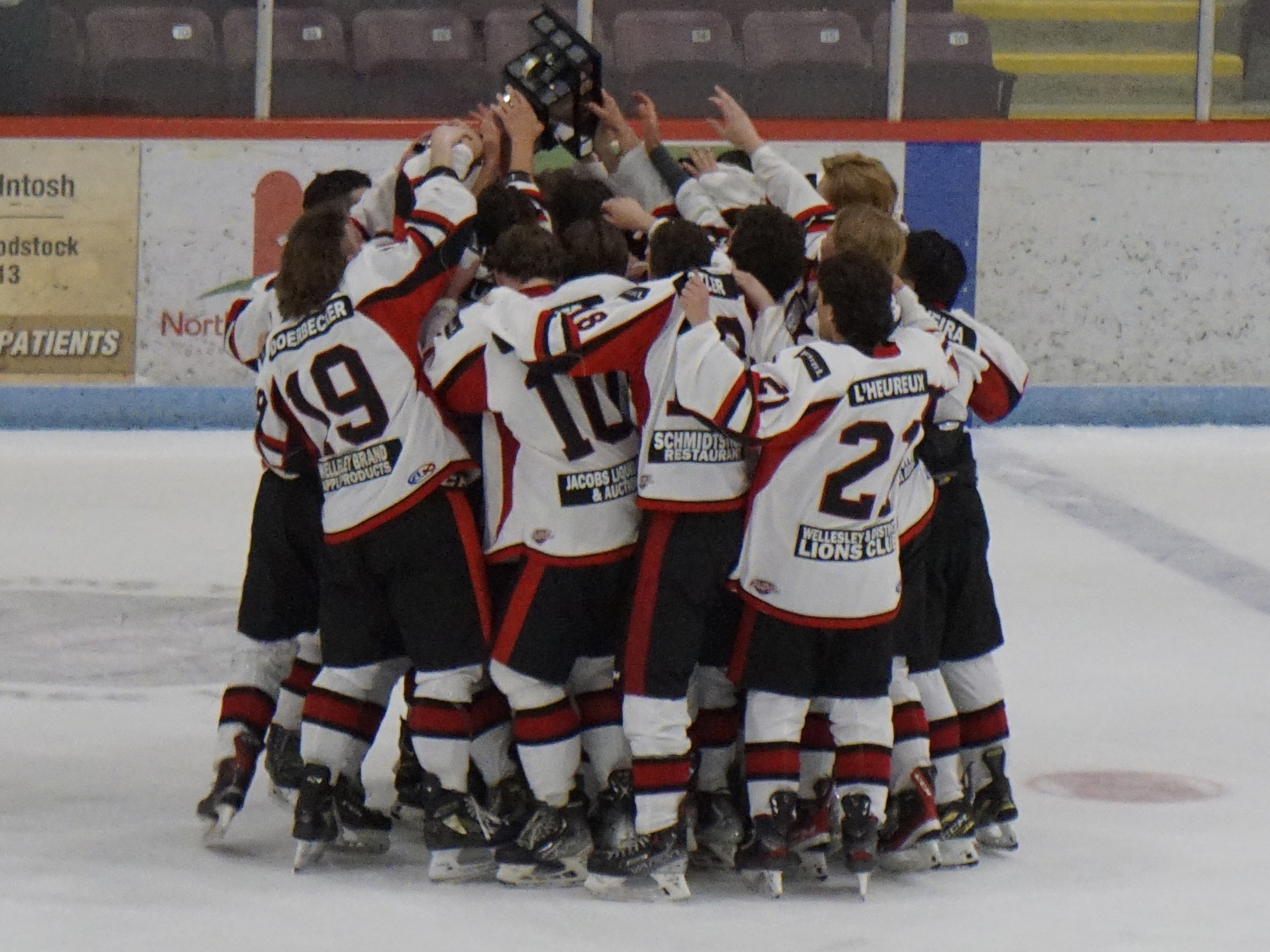
The Wellesley Applejacks winning the 2023 Schmalz Cup.

The 1998–99 season, the Applejacks again finished first in the league with 30 wins. In the playoff they made it to the league final for the fourth straight year only to lose 4-games-to-3 to the Lucan Irish.

In 2000–01, the Wellesley Apple Jacks found their footing again. They finished fifth in the OHAJDL with 25 wins and made it to the OHA Cup final again. This time they lost 4-games-to-1 to the Mount Brydges Bulldogs.

In 2002–03, the Apple Jacks finished the season in 8th place with 19 wins. They surprised the league and made it to the league finals again. Wellesley ended up getting swept by the Thamesford Trojans 4-games-to-none.

In 2006, the OHAJDL was dissolved and the Apple Jacks joined the Southern Ontario Junior Hockey League—which was promoted to Junior C officially in 2012.

In the Summer of 2013, the Ontario Hockey Association realigned the leagues and the Apple Jacks ended up in the new Midwestern Junior C Hockey League. The summer of 2016 brought more league changes to the Applejacks. The eight southern Ontario junior "C" hockey leagues amalgamated into one league dubbed the Provincial Junior Hockey League. The Midwestern league became the Doherty division in the South Conference.

== Season-by-season record ==
Season	GP	W	L	T	OTL	GF	GA	P	Results	Playoffs
1987-88	35	23	11	1	-	241	188	47	3rd WJDHL	
1988-89	36	10	22	4	-	154	186	24	16th WJDHL	
1989-90	35	12	19	4	-	147	187	28	13th WJDHL	
1990-91	40	16	18	4	2	179	188	38	11th WJDHL	
1991-92	34	20	10	2	2	187	144	44	5th OHAJDL	
1992-93	40	21	13	3	3	199	170	48	6th OHAJDL	
1993-94	40	25	10	5	-	225	157	55	5th OHAJDL	
1994-95	39	23	13	0	3	215	166	49	4th OHAJDL	
1995-96	40	27	9	0	4	195	157	58	2nd OHAJDL	
1996-97	39	28	7	1	3	203	117	60	2nd OHAJDL	
1997-98	37	28	7	1	1	157	77	58	1st OHAJDL	
1998-99	38	30	7	1	0	165	75	61	1st OHAJDL	
1999-00	38	28	9	0	1	170	92	57	3rd OHAJDL	Won Div semi-final 4-0 (Dukes); Lost Div. final 2-4 (Braves)
2000-01	40	25	11	3	1	--	--	54	5th OHAJDL	Won Div semi-final 4-2 (Centennials); Won Div. final 4-3 (Braves); Won Conference final 4-3 (Bulldogs); Lost final 1-4 (Bulldogs)
2001-02	40	28	9	2	1	190	109	59	3rd OHAJDL	Won Div semi-final 4-1 (Centennials); Won Div. final 4-0 (Hawks); Lost Conference final 1-4 (Braves)
2002-03	40	19	17	4	0	189	152	42	8th OHAJDL	Won Div semi-final 4-2 (Dukes); Won Div. final 4-2 (Braves); Won Conference final 4-1 (Hawks); Lost final 0-4 (Trojans)
2003-04	40	21	16	2	1	143	140	45	7th OHAJDL	Won Div semi-final 4-1 (Dukes); Lost Div. final 1-4 (Braves)
2004-05	39	17	13	6	3	142	130	43	11th OHAJDL	Lost Div. semi-final 3-4 (Sailors)
2005-06	39	29	6	2	2	179	110	62	1st OHAJDL	Won Conference quarter-final 4-1 (Thunderbirds); Lost Conference semi-final 1-4 (Braves)
2006-07	42	19	19	0	4	191	162	42	12th SOJHL	Lost Conference quarter-final 3-4 (Dukes)
2007-08	42	23	15	-	4	176	164	50	8th SOJHL	Lost Conference quarter-final 3-4 (Bulldogs)
2008-09	40	9	23	-	8	130	187	26	14th SOJHL	Lost Conference semi-final 0-4 (Trojans)
2009-10	36	7	23	-	6	104	177	20	14th SOJHL	DNQ
2010-11	35	17	14	-	4	138	140	38	10th SOJHL	Lost Conference quarter-final 1-4 (Centennials)
2011-12	35	19	14	-	2	134	120	40	9th SOJHL	Lost Conference quarter-final 1-4 (Centennials)
Southern Ontario Junior Hockey League - Jr "C"
2012-13	38	23	13	-	2	172	132	48	3rd SOJHL-Mc	Won Conference quarter-final 4-1 (Travellers); Lost Conference semi-final 3-4 (Hawks)
2013-14	39	19	17	-	3	197	148	41	5th MWJCHL	Lost quarter-final 3-4 (Merchants)
2014-15	40	13	27	0	-	117	166	26	8th MWJCHL	Lost quarter-final 0-4 (Centennials)
2015-16	40	21	17	2	-	149	152	44	4th of 8 MWJCHL	Won quarter-final 4-1 (Braves); Lost semi-final 0-4 (Centennials)
2016-17	40	24	14	2	-	205	130	50	2nd of 9- PJHL; Doherty Div	Won Div quarter-final 4-2(Navy-Vets); Lost Div semi-final 2-4(Mounties)
2017-18	40	22	16	1	1	178	119	46	5th of 9- PJHL; Doherty Div	Lost Div quarter-final 0-4 (Mounties)
2018-19	40	27	8	2	3	225	105	59	3rd of 9- PJHL; Doherty Div	Won Div quarter-final 4-0 (Centennials); Won Div semi-final 4-2 (Firebirds); Won Division Finals 4-1 (Braves); Lost South Conf. 2-4 (Peach Kings)
2019-20	40	28	6	2	4	249	112	62	2nd of 9- PJHL; Doherty Div	Won Div quarter-final 4-2 (Firebirds); Won Div semi-final 4-2 (Centennials) no dec - Division Finals 2-2 (Braves) playoffs cancelled - covid
2020-21	Season Lost due to COVID-19 pandemic									
2021-22	36	26	7	1	2	149	70	55	3rd of 7- PJHL; Doherty Div	Won Div quarter-final 4-0 (Shamrocks); Lost Div semi-final 2-4 (Braves)
2022-23	42	31	7	2	2	185	110	66	2nd of 7- PJHL; Doherty Div	Won Div quarter-final 4-0 (Shamrocks); Won Div semi-final 4-1 (Merchants); Won Div Finals 4-3 (Firebirds); Won South Conf Finals, 4-1 (Rangers) (Advance to Schmulz Cup Finals)
2023-24	42	19	22	1	0	121	137	39	5th of 8- PJHL; Doherty Div	Lost Div quarter-final 3-4 (Merchants)
2024-25	42	23	17	1	1	131	117	48	4th of 8 Doherty Div; 9th of 16 South Conf; 30th of 63 PJHL	Won Div quarter-final 4-0 (Dolphins); Won Div semi-final 4-3 (Merchants); Lost Div Final 1-4 (Firebirds)
2025-26	42	27	14	1	0	168	130	55	3rd of 8 Doherty Div; 6th of 16 South Conf; 22nd of 61 PJHL	Won Div quarter-final 4-0 (Shamrocks); Lost Div semi-final 0-4 (Braves)

== Clarence Schmalz Cup Championships ==
Year	Round Robin	Record	Standing	SemiFinal	Gold Medal Game
2023	L, Lakeshore Canadiens 1-4; W, Stayner Siskins 5-3; W, Clarington Eagles 7-5	2-1-0-0	1st of 4	OTW, Lakeshore Canadiens 3-2	W, Clarington Eagles 7-5; Schmaltz Cup Winner; PJHL CHAMPIONS
