= Waterloo Siskins =

Junior ice hockey team

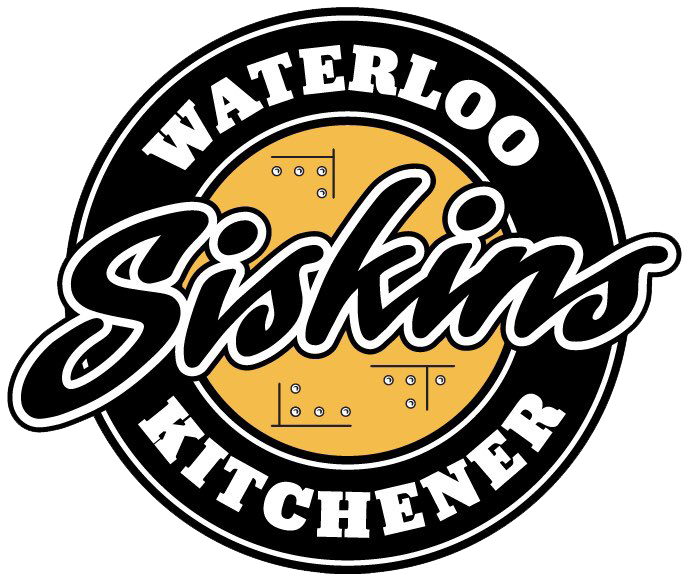
- City: Waterloo, Ontario, Canada
- League: Greater Ontario Hockey League
- Conference: Western
- Founded: 1934
- Home arena: Waterloo Memorial Recreation Complex
- Colours: Black, Yellow, and White
- General manager: Brian Huddle
- Head coach: Matt Doyle

Franchise history
- 1934–1947: Waterloo Tiger Cubs; Waterloo Orphans; Waterloo Kents
- 1947–2020: Waterloo Siskins
- 2020–2025: Kitchener-Waterloo Siskins
- 2025–present: Waterloo Siskins

The Waterloo Siskins are a junior ice hockey team based in Waterloo, Ontario, Canada. They play in the Western conference of the Greater Ontario Hockey League.

== History ==
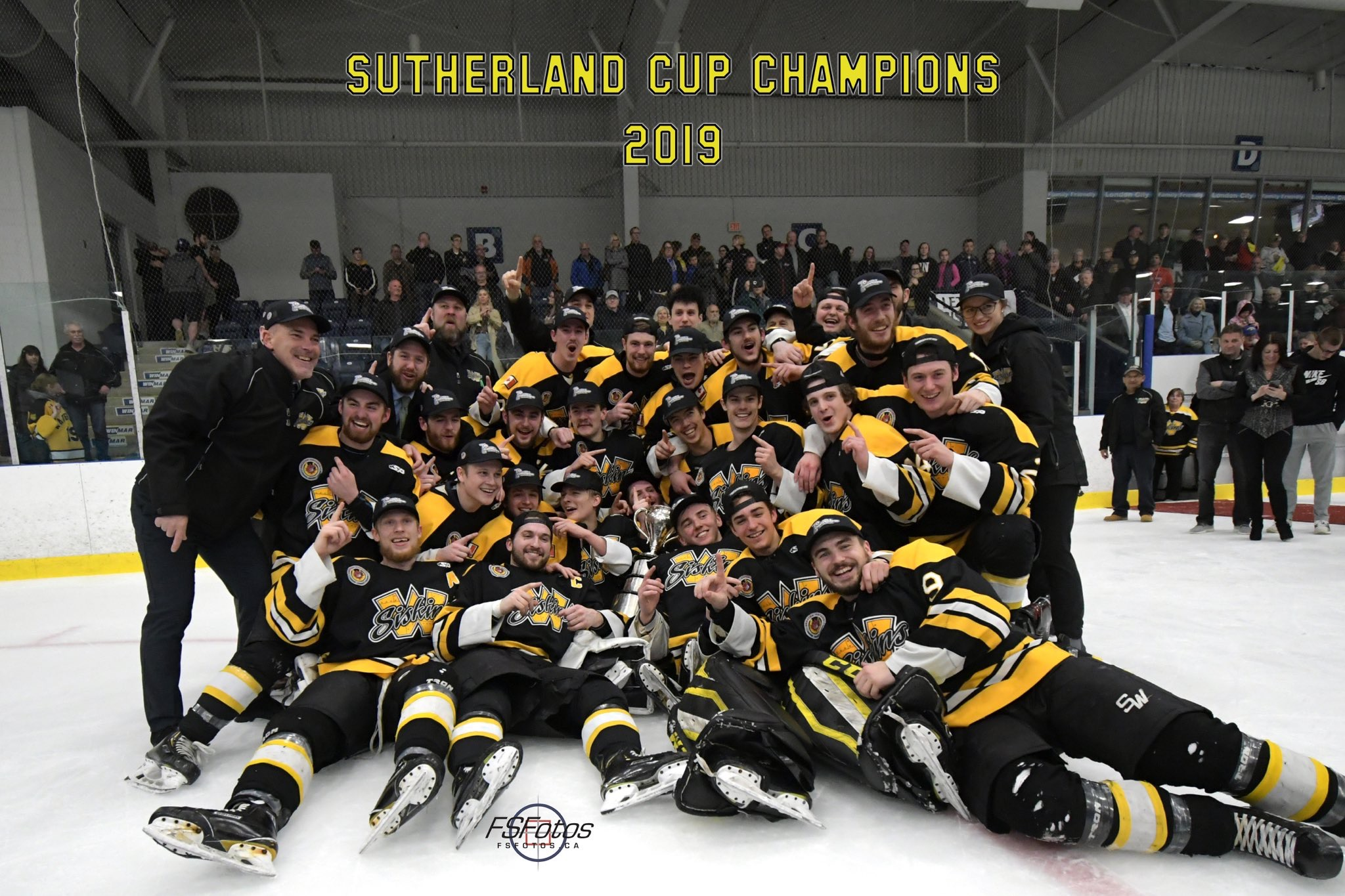
Waterloo Siskins Winning The 2019 Sutherland Cup on May 8, 2019.

Founded in 1934, the Siskins are one of the longest running Junior teams in hockey history. The team took a short hiatus in World War II. In the 1950s, the team was a part of what was then known as the "Big 10", and in 1956 was allocated in the Central "B". As part of the 1971 geographic realignment, the Siskins moved to the Western Junior B league. In 1973, the Siskins joined the Southwestern "B", which became the Waterloo-Wellington "B" in 1974, and the Midwestern "B" in 1977. The Siskins have always been a competitive team, and together with the Stratford Cullitons dominated the league for much of its first 20 years. The Siskins still operate in the Midwestern "B" to this day.

Since 1977, the Siskins have won 8 league championships and 6 Sutherland Cups as Ontario Hockey Association Junior "B" Champions. They have only had four losing records and have been regular season champions 4 times. Prior to 1977, the Siskins had won 6 Sutherland Cups for a total of 12, a record.

In 2019, the Siskins faced off against the London Nationals for the Sutherland Cup. The Siskins would go on to beat the London Nationals in game seven on an overtime goal scored by Alec Tiley giving the Siskins their 12th Sutherland Cup in team history. It was the first time in 25 years that the team had become Sutherland Cup Champions.

In 2020 after the Departure of the Kitchener Dutchmen from the area, the team changed its name to the KW Siskins.

In May of 2025, the team announced a return to the original Waterloo Siskins name.

== Season-by-season record ==
Season	GP	W	L	T	OTL	GF	GA	Pts	Results	Playoffs
1938-39	9	7	2	0	-	--	--	14	2nd OHA Gr.	
1940-41	10	3	7	0	-	40	60	6	4th OHA Gr.	
1941-42	14	6	8	0	-	56	50	12	2nd OHA Gr.	
1944-45	12	6	5	1	-	45	43	13	2nd OHA Gr.	
1945-46	11	9	2	0	-	72	37	18	1st OHA Gr.	Won League
1946-47	12	1	10	1	-	25	58	3	8th OHA Gr.	
1947-48	12	6	6	0	-	61	61	12	5th OHA Gr.	
1948-49	16	10	5	1	-	99	85	21	4th OHA Gr.	Lost final
1949-50	20	4	15	1	-	101	128	9	7th OHA Gr.	
1950-51	15	6	8	1	-	70	85	13	4th OHA Gr.	
1951-52	20	17	3	0	-	179	83	34	1st OHA Gr.	Won League
1952-53	19	14	3	2	-	119	61	30	1st OHA Gr.	Won League
1953-54	32	28	2	2	-	236	104	58	1st OHA Gr.	Won League, won SC
1954-55	30	22	8	0	-	194	123	44	2nd CJBHL	
1955-56	27	22	5	0	-	205	90	44	1st CJBHL	Won League, won SC
1956-57	27	16	10	1	-	135	122	33	3rd CJBHL	
1957-58	28	12	16	0	-	147	161	24	5th CJBHL	
1958-59	30	22	8	0	-	287	129	44	1st CJBHL	Won League, won SC
1959-60	31	17	13	1	-	170	159	35	3rd CJBHL	Won League
1960-61	30	18	10	2	-	210	175	38	2nd CJBHL	
1961-62	30	23	6	1	-	231	127	47	2nd CJBHL	Won League, won SC
1962-63	36	22	13	1	-	185	167	45	2nd CJBHL	Won League
1963-64	35	23	11	1	-	202	152	47	2nd CJBHL	Won League, won SC
1964-65	42	22	19	1	-	196	179	45	2nd CJBHL	
1965-66	39	14	24	1	-	198	235	29	5th CJBHL	
1966-67	32	20	12	0	-	218	165	40	2nd CJBHL	
1967-68	39	21	17	1	-	234	222	43	2nd CJBHL	
1968-69	36	16	16	4	-	156	174	36	5th CJBHL	
1969-70	40	14	23	3	-	157	188	31	4th CJBHL	
1970-71	41	3	35	3	-	124	338	9	5th CJBHL	
1971-72	40	11	21	8	-	150	205	30	6th WOJHL	
1972-73	42	6	31	5	-	179	303	17	8th WOJHL	
1973-74	40	23	12	5	-	224	168	51	1st SWJBHL	
1974-75	40	26	9	5	-	247	171	57	1st WWJHL	Won League
1975-76	42	27	10	5	-	298	200	59	2nd WWJHL	Won League
1976-77	40	21	16	3	-	227	195	45	2nd WWJHL	
1977-78	40	23	8	9	-	203	148	55	2nd MWJBHL	Lost final
1978-79	42	22	18	2	-	227	210	46	3rd MWJBHL	Lost semi-final
1979-80	42	32	8	2	-	313	159	66	2nd MWJBHL	Won League
1980-81	42	29	11	2	-	234	159	60	2nd MWJBHL	Lost semi-final
1981-82	42	26	16	0	-	229	162	52	4th MWJBHL	Lost semi-final
1982-83	42	28	10	4	-	236	156	60	1st MWJBHL	Lost final
1983-84	42	37	4	1	-	336	129	75	1st MWJBHL	Won League, won SC
1984-85	42	34	8	0	-	269	139	68	1st MWJBHL	Won League, won SC
1985-86	40	29	11	0	-	271	147	58	2nd MWJBHL	Lost final
1986-87	42	31	9	2	-	242	125	64	2nd MWJBHL	Lost semi-final
1987-88	48	40	7	1	-	329	147	81	1st MWJBHL	Won League, won SC
1988-89	48	43	5	0	-	345	130	86	2nd MWJBHL	Won League
1989-90	48	33	12	3	-	258	140	69	3rd MWJBHL	Lost final
1990-91	48	32	16	0	-	257	162	64	3rd MWJBHL	Won League, won SC
1991-92	48	34	12	2	-	242	146	70	2nd MWJBHL	Lost semi-final
1992-93	48	29	19	0	-	263	210	58	4th MWJBHL	Lost semi-final
1993-94	48	30	17	1	-	256	155	61	3rd MWJBHL	Won League, won SC
1994-95	48	26	17	5	-	194	154	57	4th MWJBHL	Lost quarter-final
1995-96	48	33	12	3	-	258	156	69	2nd MWJBHL	Lost quarter-final
1996-97	48	28	15	5	-	189	162	61	5th MWJBHL	Lost semi-final
1997-98	48	32	11	5	-	252	143	69	3rd MWJBHL	Lost semi-final
1998-99	48	27	18	3	-	213	161	57	4th MWJBHL	Lost quarter-final
1999-00	47	25	20	2	-	178	134	52	6th MWJBHL	Lost quarter-final
2000-01	48	28	15	5	-	193	159	61	4th MWJBHL	Lost quarter-final
2001-02	48	24	19	5	-	181	165	53	5th MWJBHL	
2002-03	48	17	25	6	4	180	167	44	7th MWJBHL	
2003-04	48	26	18	3	1	203	194	56	5th MWJBHL	
2004-05	48	28	11	6	3	216	151	65	4th MWJBHL	
2005-06	48	15	29	4	-	143	183	34	8th MWJBHL	Lost quarter-final
2006-07	48	16	26	4	2	148	184	38	8th MWJBHL	Lost quarter-final
2007-08	48	17	21	8	2	172	181	44	8th GOJHL-MW	Lost Conf. QF
2008-09	52	33	15	-	4	214	154	70	3rd GOJHL-MW	Lost Conf. SF
2009-10	51	43	7	-	1	221	116	87	2nd GOJHL-MW	Lost Conf. SF
2010-11	51	15	31	-	5	143	229	35	8th GOJHL-MW	Lost Conf. QF
2011-12	51	17	30	-	4	155	243	38	7th GOJHL-MW	Lost Conf. QF
2012-13	51	27	18	-	6	211	171	60	4th GOJHL-MW	
2013-14	49	34	12	-	3	175	129	71	3rd GOJHL-MW	Won Conf. Quarter-final, 4-1 (Hurricanes); Won Conf. Semi-final, 4-3 (Sugar Kings); Won Conf. Final, 4-2 (Cullitons); Cherrey Cup Champions; Lost Sutherland Semifinals, 1-4 (Corvairs)
2014-15	49	31	12	-	6	208	142	38	4th GOJHL-MW	Won Conf. Quarter-final, 4-0 (Hurricanes); Lost Conf. Semi-final, 0-4 (Sugar Kings)
2015-16	50	20	27	0	3	148	198	43	6th of 9-MW; 18th of 26-GOJHL	Won Conf. Quarter-final, 4-0 (Cyclones); Won Conf. Semi-final, 4-1 (Dutchmen); Lost Conf. Finals, 1-4 (Cullitons); Wildcard advance Lost Sutherland Semifinals, 0-4 (Corvairs)
2016-17	50	28	17	1	4	183	160	61	4th of 9-MW; 11th of 27-GOJHL	Won Conf. Quarter-final, 4-2 (Winter Hawks); Lost Conf. Semi-finals, 0-4 (Cyclones)
2017-18	50	25	21	1	3	190	187	54	4th of 8-MW; 13th of 26-GOJHL	Won Conf. Quarter-final, 4-3 (Dutchmen); Lost Conf. Semifinal 3-4 (Cyclones)
2018-19	48	32	13	0	3	219	143	67	3rd of 8-MW; 8th of 26-GOJHL	Won Conf. Quarter-final, 4-1 (Redhawks); Won Conf. Semifinal 4-2 (Warriors); Won Conf. Final 4-2 (Cyclones); Cherrey Cup Champions; Won Sutherland Cup Semifinals, 4-2 (Canucks); Won Sutherland Cup Final, 4-3 (Nationals); Sutherland Cup Champions
2019-20	50	21	26	0	3	132	148	45	6th of 8-MW; 16th of 26-GOJHL	Lost Conf. Quarter-final, 2-4 (Redhawks)
2020-21	Season cancelled due to covid-19 pandemic									
2021-22	48	31	15	5	0	185	129	67	3rd of 8-MW; 7th of 25-GOJHL	Won Conf. Quarter-final, 4-0 (Cyclones); Lost Conf. Semifinals, 3-4 (Redhawks)
2022-23	50	38	10	0	2	251	112	78	1st of 8-MW; 3rd of 25-GOJHL	Won Conf. Quarter-final, 4-0 (Bandits); Won Conf. Semifinals, 4-2 (Sugar Kings); Lost Conf. Finals, 2-4 (Warriors)
2023-24	50	29	13	4	4	204	134	66	4th of 8-MW; 10th of 23-GOJHL	Lost Conf. Quarter-final, 2-4 (Centennials)
2024-25	50	25	19	5	2	148	154	56	8th of 12-West Conf; 14th of 23-GOJHL	Lost Conf. Quarter-final, 1-4 (Lincolns)
2025-26	50	22	22	4	2	150	148	50	9th of 12-West Conf; 14th of 23-GOJHL	Did Not Qualify

== Sutherland Cup appearances ==
1940: Waterloo Siskins defeated Owen Sound Greys 3-games-to-1
1952: Weston Dukes defeated Waterloo Siskins 4-games-to-1
1953: Weston Dukes defeated Waterloo Siskins 4-games-to-3 with 2 ties
1954: Waterloo Siskins defeated Weston Dukes 4-games-to-3
1956: Waterloo Siskins defeated Brampton Regents 4-games-to-1 with 1 tie
1960: Waterloo Siskins defeated Toronto Marlboros 4-games-to-2 with 1 tie
1962: Waterloo Siskins defeated St. Thomas Barons 4-games-to-1
1964: Waterloo Siskins defeated Weston Dodgers 4-games-to-1
1984: Waterloo Siskins defeated Streetsville Derbys 4-games-to-3
1985: Waterloo Siskins defeated Bramalea Blues 4-games-to-1
1988: Waterloo Siskins defeated Bramalea Blues 4-games-to-1
1991: Waterloo Siskins defeated Oakville Blades 4-games-to-none
1994: Waterloo Siskins defeated St. Catharines Falcons 4-games-to-2
2019: Waterloo Siskins defeated London Nationals 4-games-to-3

== Notable alumni ==
- Jamie Allison
- Don Awrey
- Don Beaupre
- Kevin Brown
- Eric Calder
- Larry Courville
- Cole Jarrett
- Larry Johnston
- Jim Lorentz
- George Martin
- Gerry Ouellette
- Rosaire Paiement
- Ryan Parent
- Tanner Pearson
- Joel Prpic
- Steven Rice
- John Mitchell
- George Hainsworth
- Duanne Moeser
