= Tavistock Braves =

Canadian junior ice hockey team

- City: Tavistock, Ontario
- League: Provincial Junior Hockey League - Doherty Division (formerly Midwestern Junior C Hockey League)
- Founded: 1970
- Home arena: Tavistock & District Recreation Centre
- Colours: Gold, Black, and White
- General manager: Brent Lange (2024)
- Head coach: Zac Berg (2024)
- Website: Braves Webpage

Championships
- OHA Cups: 1983

The Tavistock Braves are a Junior ice hockey team based in Tavistock, Ontario, Canada. They currently play in the Provincial Junior Hockey League of the Ontario Hockey Association.

== History ==
During the 1981-82 season Tavistock finished first overall in regular season league play for the first time in franchise history. In 1982-83 the feat was repeated and was upstaged with the first and only OHA Cup in franchise history. In 1986-87 and 1987-88 Tavistock would once again post back-to-back first overall regular season finishes. However, in both seasons they would fall short of the OHA Cup.

After suffering relative mediocrity through the 1990s Tavistock would return as a power in the 2000s. In the early 2000s Tavistock was consistently held just short of a championship by a pair of Hawks. Both Exeter and Hagersville took turns ending Tavistock's postseason runs a little earlier than expected.

As the decade progressed Tavistock would encounter a new rival. In the spring of 2006 the Delhi Travellers would be responsible for eliminating the Braves in the conference finals in four games. In 2006-07 Tavistock finished first place overall during the regular season. The league's top two scorers, Jeff Roes and Joe Voll played for the Tavistock Braves during the 06-07 season, Voll set a team and conference record tallying 122 points in 42 games. However come playoff time the Braves again found themselves in a battle for the conference title with Delhi. This time falling short in a dramatic game seven double overtime loss. In 2007-08 Tavistock would again meet the rival Travellers in the McConnell Conference final, however unlike the previous two years the Braves managed to come back from a 3-1 series deficit to take the Conference title. Twenty-five years after their previous OHA Cup Championship the Braves were unable to duplicate the accomplishment and fell to a strong Thamesford Trojans team in four games.

With the restructuring of the Southern Ontario Junior Hockey League for the 2008-09 season Tavistock found themselves in a conference with longtime local rivals the Ayr Centennials and Wellesley Applejacks as well as a newly formed foe in Thamesford. Due to an imbalanced schedule Tavistock and Thamesford would play each other eight times during the regular season. The two heavy weights of the division battled it out for the conference title until January when Thamesford began to pull away. As expected the two teams breezed through their first rounds and met up in the conference finals. Tavistock came out with the short end of the stick losing an extremely close series four games to one with no games were decided by more than a goal.

In the Summer of 2013, the Ontario Hockey Association realigned and the Braves ended up in the Midwestern Junior C Hockey League.

For the 2016-17 season the eight Ontario Junior "C" hockey leagues amalgamated into one league, the Provincial Junior Hockey League. The Midwestern League was placed in the South Conference and re-branded the Pat Doherty division.

== Announcement of the Jr. Braves ==
Ahead of the 2024-2025 season, Tavistock Minor Hockey announced that the U18 Rep Team would be re-branded to the Tavistock Jr. Braves.

== Season-by-season standings ==
Season	GP	W	L	T	OTL	GF	GA	P	Results	Playoffs
1970-71	34	17	12	5	-	210	177	39	2nd WJDHL	
1971-72	30	7	22	1	-	138	210	15	7th WJDHL	
1972-73	29	4	22	3	-	114	202	11	8th WJDHL	
1973-74	34	6	27	1	-	141	269	13	8th WJDHL	
1974-75	32	12	18	2	-	168	198	28	7th WJDHL	
1975-76	28	16	8	4	-	173	131	36	3rd WJDHL	
1976-77	31	21	8	2	-	216	150	44	3rd WJDHL	
1977-78	34	8	25	1	-	149	239	17	8th WJDHL	
1978-79	34	9	21	4	-	158	236	21	8th WJDHL	
1979-80	33	10	19	4	-	148	182	24	8th WJDHL	
1980-81	34	19	10	5	-	217	150	43	4th WJDHL	
1981-82	38	27	7	4	-	260	165	58	1st WJDHL	
1982-83	38	31	5	2	-	278	147	64	1st WJDHL	
1983-84	34	15	17	2	-	220	186	32	5th WJDHL	
1984-85	34	23	9	2	-	230	158	48	2nd of 5 North Div. 3rd of 10 WJDHL	
1985-86	42	20	15	7	-	206	195	47	3rd of 6 North Div. 5th of 12 WJDHL	
1986-87	40	28	8	4	-	--	--	60	1st of 6 SJDHL	Won League; Lost OHA Cup Final, 3-4 (Irish)
1987-88	31	24	4	3	-	--	--	51	1st of 5 SJDHL	
1988-89	36	19	16	1	-	238	194	39	4th of 7 North Div. 10th of 19 WJDHL	
1989-90	35	9	21	5	-	133	183	23	5th of 6 North Div. 14th of 18 WJDHL	
1990-91	40	16	21	3	0	181	209	35	7th of 9 Eastern Div. 12th of 18 WJDHL	
1991-92	34	16	16	2	0	162	172	34	5th of 8 Eastern Div. 12th of 17 OHAJDL	
1992-93	39	13	17	7	2	141	164	35	7th of 9 Eastern Div. 12th of 18 OHAJDL	
1993-94	40	12	22	6	-	179	225	30	6th of 9 Eastern Div. 12th of 18 OHAJDL	
1994-95	39	21	11	3	4	189	172	49	3rd of 9 Eastern Div. 5th of 18 OHAJDL	
1995-96	40	17	21	0	2	181	198	36	3rd of 4 Bauer Div. 4th of 8 McConnell Conf. 11th of 18 OHAJDL	
1996-97	39	20	16	1	2	196	176	43	2nd of 4 Bauer Div. 3rd of 8 McConnell Conf. 7th of 18 OHAJDL	
1997-98	37	8	28	1	2	115	168	17	4th of 4 Bauer Div. 6th of 8 McConnell Conf. 14th of 18 OHAJDL	
1998-99	37	15	20	1	1	126	148	32	3rd of 4 Bauer Div. 5th of 8 McConnell Conf. 14th of 18 OHAJDL	
1999-00	38	15	21	1	1	145	188	32	3rd of 4 Bauer Div. 5th of 8 McConnell Conf. 12th of 18 OHAJDL	Won Div. SF, 4-3 (Centennials); Won Div. Final, 4-2 (Wellesley); Lost Conf. Final, 1-4 (Bulldogs)
2000-01	40	29	9	2	0	--	--	60	1st of 4 Bauer Div. 1st of 9 McConnell Conf. 2nd of 18 OHAJDL	Won Div. SF, 4-0 (Dukes); Lost Div. Final, 3-4 (Applejacks)
2001-02	40	28	7	4	1	213	112	61	1st of 4 Bauer Div. 1st of 9 McConnell Conf. 2nd of 19 OHAJDL	Won Conf. QF, 4-0 (Dukes); Won Conf. SF, 4-0 (Travellers); Won Conf. Final, 4-1 (Applejacks); Lost OHA Cup Final, 0-4 (E. Hawks)
2002-03	40	21	15	2	2	158	145	46	3rd of 4 Bauer Div. 4th of 9 McConnell Conf. 6th of 18 OHAJDL	Won Conf. QF, 4-3 (Centennials); Lost Conf. SF, 2-4 (Applejacks)
2003-04	40	30	9	1	0	187	116	61	1st of 4 Bauer Div. 2nd of 9 McConnell Conf. 2nd of 18 OHAJDL	Won Conf. QF, 4-0 (Centennials); Won Conf. SF, 4-1 (Applejacks); Won Conf. Final, 4-2 (H. Hawks); Lost OHA Cup Final, 2-4 (E. Hawks)
2004-05	39	27	9	3	0	174	126	57	1st of 4 Bauer Div. 2nd of 9 McConnell Conf. 2nd of 18 OHAJDL	Won Conf. QF, 4-0 (Bulldogs); Won Conf. SF, 4-1 (Travellers); Lost Conf. Final, 2-4 (H. Hawks)
2005-06	37	21	10	5	1	191	126	48	3rd of 4 Bauer Div. 5th of 9 McConnell Conf. 7th of 18 OHAJDL	Won Conf. QF, 4-2 (Dukes); Won Conf. SF, 4-1 (Applejacks); Lost Conf. Final, 0-4 (Travellers)
2006-07	42	34	7	0	1	243	116	69	1st of 4 Bauer Div. 1st of 8 McConnell Conf. 1st of 19 SOJHL	Won Conf. QF, 4-0 (Centennials); Won Conf. SF, 4-2 (H. Hawks); Lost Conf. Final, 3-4 (Travellers)
2007-08	42	26	14	-	2	169	115	54	2nd of 4 Bauer Div. 3rd of 8 McConnell Conf. 6th of 16 SOJHL	Won Conf. QF, 4-0 (H. Hawks); Won Conf. SF, 4-1 (Dukes); Won Conf. Final, 4-3 (Travellers); Lost OHA Cup Final, 0-4 (Trojans)
2008-09	40	19	17	-	4	131	137	42	2nd of 4 Bauer Div. 6th of 14 SOJHL	Won Div. SF, 4-1 (Centennials); Lost Div. Final, 1-4 (Trojans)
2009-10	36	17	14	-	5	136	136	39	4th of 5 Bauer Div. 8th of 15 SOJHL	Won Div. SF, 4-1 (Centennials); Lost Div. Final, 3-4 (Trojans)
2010-11	35	26	6	-	3	160	91	55	1st of 8 McConnell Div. 1st of 15 SOJHL	Won Div. QF, 4-0 (Sailors); Won Div. SF, 4-3 (Travellers); Lost Div. Final, 2-4 (Centennials)
2011-12	35	21	11	-	3	141	97	45	3rd of 8 McConnell Div. 6th of 15 SOJHL	Lost div. quarter-final, 3-4 (Dukes)
Southern Ontario Junior Hockey League - Jr "C"
2012-13	38	17	18	-	3	151	129	37	5th of 7 McConnell Div. 10th of 15 SOJHL	Won Div. QF, 4-2 (Bulldogs); Lost Div. SF, 1-4 (Centennials)
2013-14	40	16	22	-	2	110	160	34	6th of 9 MWJCHL	Lost quarter-final, 2-4 (Firebirds)
2014-15	40	17	21	2	-	117	127	36	7th of 9 MWJCHL	Lost quarter-final, 1-4 (Firebirds)
2015-16	40	19	20	1	-	131	151	39	5th of 9 MWJCHL	Lost quarter-final, 1-4 (Applejacks)
2016-17	40	18	22	0	-	153	153	36	7th of 9 Doherty Div. PJHL	Lost Div. QF, 3-4 (Mounties)
2017-18	40	29	6	2	3	215	115	63	2nd of 9 Doherty Div. PJHL	Won Div. QF, 4-1 (Firebirds); Won Div. SF, 4-0 (Navy-Vets); Won Div. Final, 4-3 (Centennials); Lost Conf. Final, 0-4 (Rangers)
2018-19	40	32	5	1	2	209	79	67	1st of 9 Doherty Div. PJHL	Won Div. QF, 4-0 (Travellers); Won Div. SF, 4-3 (Mounties); Lost Div. Final, 1-4 (Applejacks)
2019-20	40	30	6	3	1	240	92	64	1st of 9 Doherty Div. PJHL	Won Div. QF, 4-0 (Bulldogs); Won Div. SF, 4-0 (Navy-Vets); Incomplete Div. Final 1-1 (Applejacks); Remaining playoffs suspended COVID-19
2020-21	Season Lost due to COVID-19 pandemic									
2021-22	36	26	6	2	2	172	82	56	2nd of 7 Doherty Div. PJHL	Won Div. SF, 4-2 (Applejacks); Lost Div. Final 2-4, (Firebirds)
2022-23	41	21	15	3	2	142	121	47	4th of 7 Doherty Div. PJHL	Won Div. QF, 4-3 (Navy-Vets); Lost Div. Final 0-4, (Firebirds)
2023-24	42	23	16	1	2	142	114	49	3rd of 7 Doherty Div. PJHL	Lost Div. QF, 3-4 (Shamrocks)
2024-25	42	12	28	2	1	128	187	26	7th of 8 Doherty Div. PJHL	Lost Div. QF, 3-4 (Firebirds)
2025-26	42	28	11	2	1	182	130	59	2nd of 8 Doherty Div. 4th of 16 South Conf; 15th of 61 PJHL	Won Div. QF, 4-0 (Titans); Won Div Semifinal 4-0 (Applejacks); Won Div Finals 4-3 (Navy-Vets); Won S.Conf Finals 4-1 (Blues); Won League Semi Finals 4-2 (Canadiens); Lost Schmalz Cup Finals 4-1 (Whalers)

=== Playoffs ===
- 1983 Won league, won OHA Championship

Tavistock Braves defeated St. George Dukes 4-games-to-2 in OHA final

== Clarence Schmalz Cup appearances ==
2026: Fergus Whalers defeated Tavistock Braves 4-games-to-1

== Notable alumni ==
Jeff Zehr played for the Tavistock Braves during the 1993–94 season.
