= New Hamburg Firebirds =

Canadian junior ice hockey team

- City: New Hamburg, Ontario
- League: Provincial Junior Hockey League
- Division: Dougherty
- Founded: 1953
- Home arena: Wilmot Recreation Complex
- Colours: Red, Yellow, Blue, and White
- General manager: Shane Gerber
- Head coach: Shane Gerber (2015-16)
- Website: Firebirds Website

Franchise history
- 1953–1960: New Hamburg CL Roth's
- 1960–1983: New Hamburg Hahns
- 1983–1997: New Hamburg Spirit 83's
- 1997–present: New Hamburg Firebirds

Championships
- Playoff championships: 1963, 1967, 1968, 1969, 1990, 1991, 2024
- Clarence Schmalz Cups: 1963, 1967

The New Hamburg Firebirds are a Junior ice hockey team based in New Hamburg, Ontario, Canada. They are members of the Provincial Junior Hockey League of the Ontario Hockey Association.

== History ==
The Hahns started out in the Interbrew Junior "C" Hockey League, and later joined the Central Junior C Hockey League. They made the jump up to the Midwestern Junior B Hockey League in 1977 and stayed there until 1982 when they returned to Junior "C" in the NJCHL.

While in the Central Jr. C league (now known as the Western Jr. C league), the Hahns won two Clarence Schmalz Cups as All-Ontario champions - 1963 and 1967.

After some uncertainty in the Summer of 2013, the Firebirds ended up in the new Midwestern Junior C Hockey League. In 2016 the eight Junior 'C' hockey leagues in Southern Ontario amalgamated under one banner as the Provincial Junior Hockey League. The Midwestern Junior C Hockey League became the Doherty Division and were aligned in the Southern Conference with the Bloomfield division.

== Season-by-season standings ==
Season	GP	W	L	T	OTL	GF	GA	P	Results	Playoffs
1962-63	Statistics Not Available									Won League, won CSC
1963-64	29	15	14	0	-	141	122	30	3rd CJCHL	
1964-65	31	21	8	2	-	170	128	44	2nd CJCHL	
1965-66	31	26	5	0	-	194	112	52	2nd CJCHL	Won League
1966-67	24	15	6	3	-	127	86	33	1st WJCHL	Won League, won CSC
1967-68	Statistics Not Available									
1968-69	30	23	3	4	-	157	58	50	1st WJCHL	Won League
1969-70	Statistics Not Available									
1970-71	32	27	3	2	-	--	--	56	1st CJCHL	
1971-72	Statistics Not Available									
1972-73	31	21	9	1	-	--	--	43	2nd CJCHL	
1973-74	32	22	6	4	-	182	109	48	2nd CJCHL	
1974-75	30	20	9	1	-	211	127	41	1st CJCHL II	
1975-76	35	26	8	1	-	253	157	53	1st CJCHL II	
1976-77	36	24	8	4	-	258	128	52	3rd CJCHL	
1977-78	40	8	29	3	-	163	267	19	6th MWJBHL	DNQ
1978-79	42	17	21	4	-	206	199	38	4th MWJBHL	Lost semi-final
1979-80	42	15	23	4	-	189	234	34	5th MWJBHL	Lost quarter-final
1980-81	42	15	24	3	-	183	220	33	6th MWJBHL	Lost quarter-final
1981-82	42	9	32	1	-	167	279	19	7th MWJBHL	DNQ
1982-83	36	9	21	6	-	--	--	24	5th NJC-W	
1983-84	30	18	9	3	-	--	--	39	3rd NJC-W	
1984-85	32	17	12	3	-	180	135	37	3rd SWJCHL	
1985-86	36	25	7	4	-	--	--	54	1st NJC-W	
1986-87	34	18	10	6	-	--	--	42	2nd NJC-W	
1987-88	36	20	14	2	-	--	--	42	3rd NJC-W	
1988-89	35	22	8	5	-	--	--	49	2nd NJC-W	
1989-90	36	20	8	8	-	--	--	48	3rd NJC-W	
1990-91	34	21	10	3	-	--	--	45	2nd NJC-W	
1991-92	33	20	10	3	-	175	129	43	2nd NJC-W	
1992-93	36	11	23	2	-	167	217	24	7th NJC-W	
1993-94	36	9	25	2	-	151	252	20	7th NJC-W	
1994-95	36	14	18	4	-	163	169	32	5th NJC-W	
1995-96	40	10	26	4	-	148	210	24	5th NJC-W	
1996-97	40	11	27	1	1	150	196	24	5th NJC-W	DNQ
1997-98	39	16	22	1	0	173	186	33	5th NJC-W	DNQ
1998-99	35	19	16	-	0	--	--	38	3rd NJC-W	
1999-00	36	27	8	-	1	--	--	55	1st NJC-W	Won Div quarter-final 4-0 (Storm); Lost Div final 2-4 (Merchants)
2000-01	36	17	17	1	1	--	--	36	3rd NJC-W	Lost Div semi-final 1-4 (Navy Vets)
2001-02	36	11	21	2	2	--	--	26	4th NJC-W	Lost Div semi-final 2-4 (Navy Vets)
2002-03	36	8	21	3	4	102	158	23	10th NJCHL	Lost Div semi-final 2-4 (Merchants)
2003-04	36	20	12	2	2	163	142	44	5th NJCHL	Lost Div semi-final 1-4 (Storm)
2004-05	36	13	18	2	3	145	163	31	9th NJCHL	DNQ
2005-06	36	6	25	3	2	91	162	17	12th NJCHL	DNQ
2006-07	36	10	25	0	1	123	189	21	10th NJCHL	DNQ
2007-08	36	21	15	0	0	138	136	42	6th NJCHL	Won Preliminary Round 4-2 (Renegades); Lost quarter-final 0-4 (Spitfires)
2008-09	36	16	18	-	2	114	118	34	9th NJCHL	DNQ
2009-10	36	15	19	-	2	125	155	32	4th NJC-W	Won Div quarter-final 4-3 (Spitfires); Lost Div semi-final 2-4 (Storm)
2010-11	36	24	10	-	2	157	113	50	2nd NJC-W	Lost Div semi-final 2-4 (Storm)
2011-12	36	27	6	-	3	172	106	57	1st NJC-W	Won Div quarter-final 4-0 (Navy Vets); Won Div semi-final 4-1 (Spitfires); Won NJC-W 4-1 (Merchants); Lost final 0-4 (Peach Kings)
2012-13	38	32	4	-	2	221	93	66	1st NJC-W	Won Div. semi-final 4-1 (Storm); Won NJC-W 4-2 (Merchants); Lost final 2-4 (Peach Kings)
2013-14	40	30	8	-	2	208	130	62	3rd MWJCHL	Won quarter-final 4-2 (Braves); Lost semi-final 3-4 (Centennials)
2014-15	40	29	10	1	-	174	103	59	2nd MWJCHL	Won quarter-final 4-1 (Braves); Lost semi-final 3-4 (Merchants)
2015-16	40	31	8	1	-	187	107	63	2nd of 9 MWJCHL	Won quarter-final, 4-0 (Merchants); Won semifinal 4-1 (Mounties); Lost finals, 1-4 (Centennials)
2016-17	40	22	18	0	-	152	149	44	4th of 9, PJHL; Doherty Div	Lost Div quarter-final 1-4 (Merchants)
2017-18	40	15	19	3	3	125	142	36	7th of 9, PJHL; Doherty Div	Lost Div quarter-final 1-4 (Braves)
2018-19	40	29	9	0	2	175	88	60	2nd of 9, PJHL; Doherty Div	Won Div quarter-final 4-2 (Navy-Vets); Lost Div semi-final 2-4 (Applejacks)
2019-20	40	17	17	3	3	182	122	40	7th of 9, PJHL; Doherty Div	Lost Div quarter-final 2-4 (Applejacks)
2020-21	Season Lost due to COVID-19 pandemic									
2021-22	36	23	9	1	3	136	84	50	4th of 8, PJHL; Doherty Div	Won Div quarter-final 4-1 (Merchants); Won Div semi-final 4-3 (Navy-Vets); Won Div. Finals 4-2 (Braves); Lost Confer Finals 2-4 (Peach Kings)
2022-23	42	31	6	3	2	194	91	67	1st of 8, PJHL; Doherty Div	Div quarter-final bye Won Div semi-final 4-0 (Braves); Lost Div Finals 3-4 (Applejacks)
2023-24	42	33	7	2	0	187	106	68	1st of 7, PJHL; Doherty Div	Div quarter-final bye Won Div Semi finals 4-1 (Shamrocks); Won League 4-1 (Navy-Vets); Won South Conference 4-1 (Peach Kings); Lost CSC semi-final 2-4 (Canadiens}
2024-25	42	32	8	0	2	171	112	66	2nd of 8, PJHL; Doherty Div	Won Div quarter-final 4-3 (Braves); Won Div semi-finals 4-1 (Navy-Vets); Won League 4-1 (Applejacks); Won South Conference 4-3 (Peach Kings); Lost CSC semi-final 1-4 (73's)
2025-26	42	24	13	4	1	154	135	53	4th of 8, Doherty; 7th of 16 SOuth Conf; 28th of 61 PJHL	Lost Div quarter-final 1-4 (Merchants)

- 1963–73
- 1973–77
- 1977–82
- 1982–2002
- 2002–09

== Notable alumni ==
- Jim Nahrgang
- John Tanner
