= Norwich Merchants =

Canadian junior ice hockey team

- City: Norwich, Ontario
- League: Provincial Junior Hockey League
- Conference: South
- Division: Pat Doherty
- Founded: 1968
- Home arena: Nor-Del Arena
- Colours: Red, Black, and White
- General manager: Darren House
- Head coach: Derek Partlo (2024)
- Website: norwichjrcmerchants.com

The Norwich Merchants are a junior hockey team based in Norwich, Ontario, Canada. They are members of the Provincial Junior Hockey League of the Ontario Hockey Association.

== History ==
Founded in 1968, the Merchants won the Southern Counties Junior D Hockey League championship the next season, then went on to win the OHA Cup as provincial champions by defeating the Haliburton Huskies of the Central League.

In 1980, the Merchants were promoted to Junior C and joined the Niagara & District Junior C Hockey League. In 1986, the Merchants were Niagara League champions. They went on to defeat the Bradford Blues of the Mid-Ontario Junior Hockey League to win the Clarence Schmalz Cup as OHA Junior C champions. In 1987, they were again Niagara League champions. They again made it to the provincial final, but this time lost to the Lakefield Chiefs of the Central Ontario Junior C Hockey League.

In November 2011, the Merchants were sanctioned by the Ontario Hockey Association for the overpayment of a former player during his time with the team. Although the team claimed the money was for education purposes, the OHA fined the team $25,000, suspended three board members for the rest of the season and three additional seasons, their 2011-12 roster was frozen for the rest of the season, and they were barred from signing imports for three following seasons. The Merchants appealed the decision to the Ontario Hockey Federation. The OHF overturned the roster freeze and import restrictions saying that it was not within the OHA's constitution to wield those powers. Both sides then appealed to Hockey Canada who sided with neither party, which left the fine and suspensions in place.

After thirty-three years as members of the Niagara & District Junior C Hockey League, the Ontario Hockey Association realigned and the Merchants ended up in the new Midwestern Junior C Hockey League. Three years later the eight Southern Ontario junior "C" hockey leagues amalgamated into one league, the Provincial Junior Hockey League. This means that they are now competing in the Pat Doherty Division of the Central Conference.

The playoffs for the 2019-20 season were cancelled due to the COVID-19 pandemic, leading to the team not being able to play a single game.

== Season-by-season record ==
Note: GP = Games Played, W = Wins, L = Losses, T = Ties, OTL = Overtime Losses, GF = Goals for, GA = Goals against

Season	GP	W	L	T	OTL	GF	GA	Points	Finish	Playoffs
1968-69	30	15	14	1	-	170	145	31	4th SCJDHL	
1969-70	30	15	14	1	-	157	127	31	4th SCJDHL	Won League, Won OHA Cup
1970-71	30	18	10	2	-	160	138	38	2nd SCJDHL	
1971-72	28	12	13	3	-	129	120	27	4th SCJDHL	
1972-73	30	18	10	2	-	200	147	38	3rd SCJDHL	
1973-74	28	14	14	0	-	163	162	28	4th SCJDHL	
1974-75	30	15	15	0	-	172	159	30	3rd SCJDHL	
1975-76	35	21	13	1	-	--	--	43	4th SCJDHL	
1976-77	28	15	12	1	-	--	--	31	3rd SCJDHL	
1977-78	35	9	22	4	-	155	226	22	7th SJDHL	
1978-79	32	12	20	0	-	157	189	22	8th SJDHL	
1979-80	34	18	15	1	-	204	186	37	4th SJDHL	
1980-81	32	15	13	4	-	--	--	34	4th NJC-W	
1981-82	32	26	5	1	-	--	--	53	1st NJC-W	
1982-83	36	24	8	4	-	--	--	52	2nd NJC-W	
1983-84	30	21	7	2	-	--	--	44	1st NJC-W	
1984-85	32	28	4	0	-	230	101	56	1st SWJCHL	
1985-86	36	24	6	6	-	--	--	54	2nd NJC-W	Won League, Won CSC
1986-87	34	20	10	4	-	--	--	44	1st NJC-W	Won League, Lost CSC Final
1987-88	36	27	5	4	-	--	--	58	1st NJC-W	
1988-89	35	13	21	1	-	--	--	27	6th NJC-W	
1989-90	36	25	7	4	-	--	--	54	1st NJC-W	
1990-91	34	20	12	2	-	--	--	42	3rd NJC-W	
1991-92	35	16	14	5	-	190	165	37	4th NJC-W	
1992-93	36	12	19	5	-	195	244	29	5th NJC-W	
1993-94	36	13	15	8	-	145	145	34	4th NJC-W	
1994-95	36	21	11	4	-	198	135	46	3rd NJC-W	
1995-96	40	25	12	3	-	222	151	53	2nd NJC-W	
1996-97	40	23	14	2	1	202	153	49	3rd NJC-W	
1997-98	40	26	13	1	0	232	160	53	2nd NJC-W	Won Division, Lost Final
1998-99	35	24	10	-	1	--	--	49	2nd NJC-W	Lost Div. Final
1999-00	36	23	10	-	3	--	--	49	2nd NJC-W	Won Div semi-final 4-0 (Navy Vets); Won Div final 4-2 (Firebirds); Lost final 3-4 (Riverhawks)
2000-01	36	24	9	1	2	--	--	51	1st NJC-W	Won Div semi-final 4-1 (Storm); Won Div final 4-0 (Navy Vets); Lost final 0-4 (Riverhawks)
2001-02	36	19	13	2	2	--	--	42	2nd NJC-W	Won Div semi-final 4-1 (Storm); Lost Div final 1-4 (Navy Vets)
2002-03	36	23	10	1	2	150	117	49	3rd NJCHL	Won quarter-final 4-2 (Firebirds); Won semi-final 4-1 (Storm); Lost final 0-4 (Peach Kings)
2003-04	36	25	6	1	4	160	96	55	2nd NJCHL	Won quarter-final 4-2 (Spitfires); Lost semi-final 0-4 (Storm)
2004-05	36	18	13	2	3	136	126	41	4th NJCHL	Won quarter-final 4-2 (Spitfires); Lost semi-final 0-4 (Storm)
2005-06	36	27	6	2	1	185	118	57	3rd NJCHL	Won quarter-final 4-2 (Spitfires); Lost semi-final 1-4 (Storm)
2006-07	36	24	9	2	1	183	120	51	3rd NJCHL	Won quarter-final 4-2 (Spitfires); Won semi-final 4-1 (Navy Vets); Lost Final 2-4 (Peach Kings)
2007-08	36	22	11	1	2	158	88	47	3rd NJCHL	Won quarter-final 4-1 (Storm); Won semi-final 4-1 (Spitfires); Lost Final 2-4 (Peach Kings)
2008-09	36	24	7	-	5	168	105	53	2nd NJCHL	Won quarter-final 4-2 (Renegades); Won Div final 4-1 (Storm); Won League 1-4 (Peach Kings); Lost CSC semi-final 1-4 (73's)
2009-10	36	27	7	-	2	162	93	56	2nd NJCHL	Won Div quarter-final 4-0 (Mounties); Won Div semi-final 4-0 (Renegades); Won Div final 4-1 (Storm); Lost Final 2-4 (Peach Kings)
2010-11	36	32	2	-	2	187	83	66	1st NJCHL	Won Div quarter-final 4-2 (Navy Vets); Won Div semi-final 4-2 (Spitfires); Won Div final 4-1 (Storm); Lost Final 3-4 (Peach Kings)
2011-12	36	24	9	-	3	144	101	51	4th NJCHL	Won Div quarter-final (Mounties); Lost Div. Final 1-4 (Firebirds)
2012-13	38	29	7	-	2	164	80	60	2nd NJC-W	Won Div semi-final 4-1 (Mounties); Lost Div. Final 2-4 (Firebirds)
2013-14	40	27	11	-	2	170	115	56	4th MWJCHL	Won Quarters, 4-3 (Applejacks); Lost Semi's, 0-4 (Mounties)
2014-15	40	24	15	1	-	145	120	49	3rd MWJCHL	Won Quarters, 4-2 (Bulldogs); Won Semi's, 4-3 (Firebirds) lost League Finals, 0-4 (Centennials)
2015-16	40	15	23	2	-	129	161	32	7th of 9 MWJCHL	Lost Quarters, 0-4 (Firebirds)
2016-17	40	22	18	0	-	181	153	44	5th of 9, PJHL; Doherty Div	Won Div Quarters, 4-1 (Firebirds); Lost Div. Semifinals, 0-4 (Centennials)
2017-18	40	17	18	3	2	176	150	39	6th of 9, PJHL; Doherty Div	Lost Div Quarters, 1-4 (Navy-Vets)
2018-19	40	21	16	0	3	176	138	45	5th of 9, PJHL; Doherty Div	Lost Div Quarters, 2-4 (Mounties)
2019-20	40	21	17	2	0	208	141	44	5th of 9, PJHL; Doherty Div	Lost Div Quarters, 1-4 (Centennials)
2020-21	Season Lost due to COVID-19 pandemic									
2021-22	36	10	19	4	3	114	161	27	5th of 7, PJHL; Doherty Div	Lost Div Quarters, 1-4 (Firebirds)
2022-23	42	29	12	1	0	190	122	59	3rd of 7, PJHL; Doherty Div	Won Div Quarters, 4-1 (Mounties); Lost Div Semis 1-4 (Applejacks)
2023-24	42	19	17	5	1	141	144	44	4th of 8, PJHL; Doherty Div	Won Div Quarters, 4-3 (Applejacks); Lost Div. Semifinals, 1-4 (Navy-Vets)
2024-25	42	34	8	0	0	183	99	68	1st of 8 Doherty Div; 2nd of 16 South Conf; 10th of 63 - PJHL	Won Div Quarters, 4-0 (Shamrocks); Lost Div. Semifinals, 3-4 (Applejacks)
2025-26	42	23	14	2	1	155	146	51	5th of 8 Doherty Div; 8th of 16 South Conf; 30th of 61 - PJHL	Won Div Quarters, 4-1 (Firebirds); Lost Div. Semifinals, 2-4 (Navy-Vets)

== Clarence Schmalz Cup Final appearances ==
1986: Norwich Merchants defeated Bradford Blues 4-games-to-3
1987: Lakefield Chiefs defeated Norwich Merchants 4-games-to-2
