= Kitchener Dutchmen =

- City: Kitchener, Ontario, Canada
- League: Greater Ontario Junior Hockey League
- Division: Mid-Western
- Founded: 1956
- Folded: 2020
- Home arena: Kitchener Memorial Auditorium Complex
- Colours: Blue, red, and white
- General manager: Jeff Grimwood
- Head coach: Greg Bignell (2015)
- Affiliates: Kitchener Rangers (OHL)

Franchise history
- 1956–1969: Kitchener Greenshirts
- 1969–1988: Kitchener Ranger B's
- 1988–2020: Kitchener Dutchmen

The Kitchener Dutchmen were a Canadian junior ice hockey team based in Kitchener, Ontario, Canada. They played in the Mid-Western division of the Greater Ontario Junior Hockey League. The Dutchmen turned into the Ayr Centennials.

== History ==
The Kitchener Dutchmen franchise was founded in 1956 when the Junior A Kitchener Canucks were moved to become the Peterborough Petes. With the Canucks gone, the new Kitchener Greenshirts were founded as members of the Central Junior B Hockey League to fill the void left by their Junior A counterparts.

The Greenshirts changed their name to the "Ranger B's" in 1969 to better reflect their relationship with their parent club, the Kitchener Rangers who entered the market in 1963. The team started in the Central Junior B league, but as part of the 1971 geographic realignment, moved to the Western Junior B league. In 1973, the team joined the "Southwestern Junior "B" Hockey League", which became the "Waterloo-Wellington Junior "B" Hockey League" and then the Midwestern "B" in 1977. The team was a long-standing member of the league but relocated to Ayr in 2020.

An original charter member team, in 1992 the franchise became the first team in Mid-Western "B" history, other than the Waterloo Siskins and the Stratford Cullitons, to win the league and the Sutherland Cup. They won a second consecutive league title in 1993, but failed to come away with another Ontario Hockey Association title. The team did not miss the playoffs from 1979 until they relocated. The Dutchmen were a long time farm team for the Kitchener Rangers of the Ontario Hockey League.

On April 26, 2020, it was announced that the OHA had given approval for the Ayr Centennials to purchase the Dutchmen and move them to Ayr in order to promote the Centennials from Junior C to Junior B, effective starting in the 2020-21 season. This thus brought an end to the 63 years of Dutchmen hockey in Kitchener.

== Season-by-season record ==
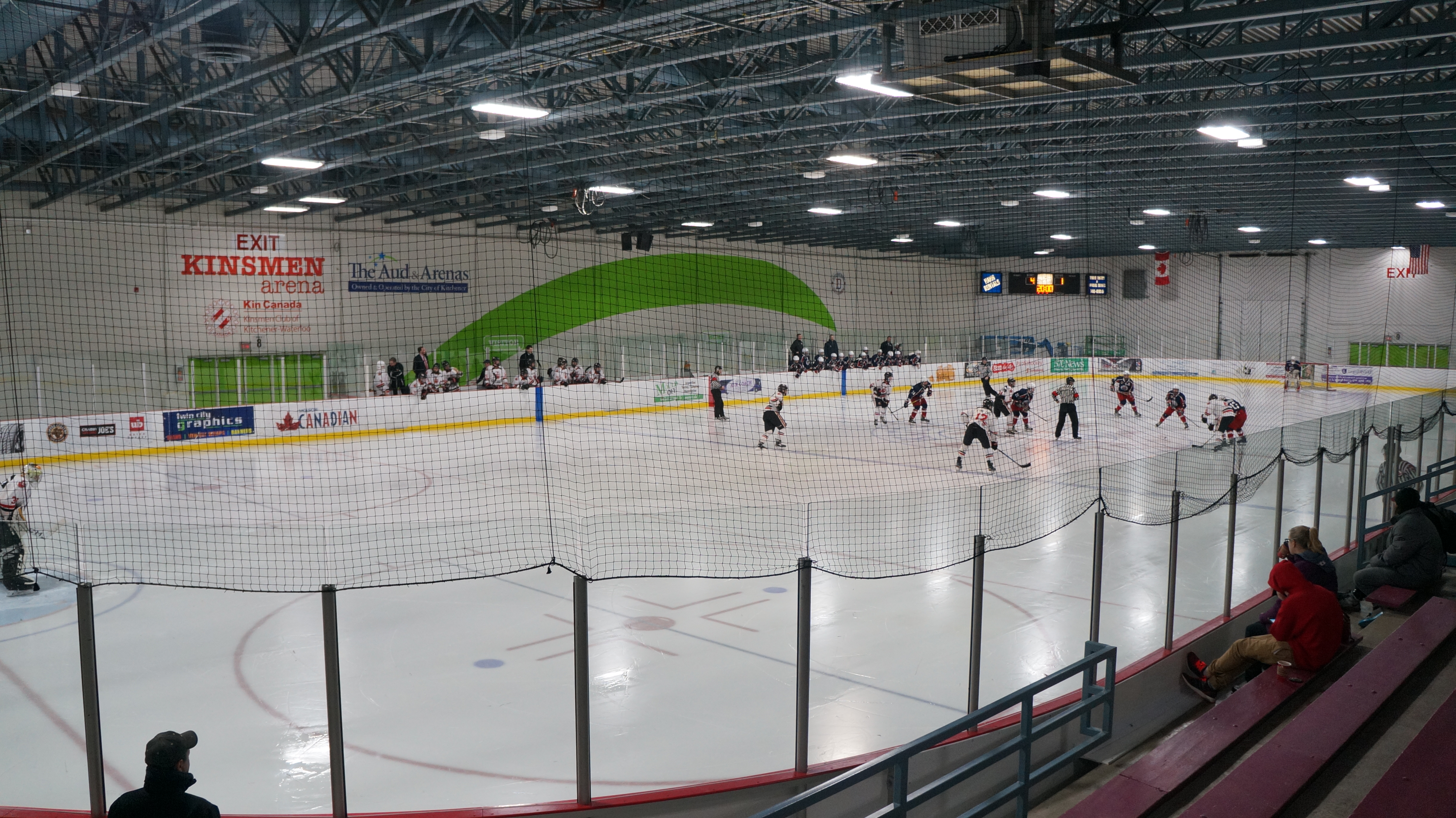
A Kitchener Dutchmen home game

Season	GP	W	L	T	OTL	GF	GA	Pts	Results	Playoffs
1956–57	27	11	14	2	—	77	97	24	4th CJBHL	
1957–58	30	20	10	0	—	148	109	40	2nd CJBHL	
1958–59	30	7	23	0	—	83	175	14	6th CJBHL	
1959–60	30	4	25	1	—	—	—	9	5th CJBHL	
1960–61	30	15	15	0	—	168	175	30	3rd CJBHL	
1961–62	30	25	4	1	—	231	121	51	1st CJBHL	
1962–63	36	14	22	0	—	144	184	28	4th CJBHL	
1963–64	34	13	20	1	—	146	170	27	4th CJBHL	
1964–65	42	31	11	0	—	236	138	62	1st CJBHL	Won League, won Sutherland Cup
1965–66	38	30	8	0	—	281	149	60	1st CJBHL	Won League
1966–67	32	26	5	1	—	230	114	53	1st CJBHL	Won League, won Sutherland Cup
1967–68	40	19	17	4	—	197	186	42	3rd CJBHL	Won League
1968–69	36	24	7	5	—	246	130	53	1st CJBHL	
1969–70	40	23	13	4	—	243	191	50	2nd CJBHL	
1970–71	42	20	18	4	—	229	184	44	3rd CJBHL	
1971–72	40	28	8	4	—	242	158	60	1st WOJHL	
1972–73	41	12	22	7	—	191	235	31	7th WOJHL	
1973–74	40	23	13	4	—	242	172	50	2nd SWJBHL	
1974–75	40	25	11	4	—	264	176	54	2nd WWJHL	
1975–76	42	17	20	5	—	252	233	39	4th WWJHL	Lost semi-final
1976–77	40	20	17	3	—	216	207	43	3rd WWJHL	
1977–78	40	9	28	3	—	159	251	21	5th MWJBHL	Did not qualify
1978–79	42	12	23	7	—	167	229	31	6th MWJBHL	Did not qualify
1979–80	42	15	20	7	—	186	219	37	3rd MWJBHL	Lost semi-final
1980–81	42	21	20	1	—	217	206	43	4th MWJBHL	Lost final
1981–82	42	29	13	0	—	266	177	58	3rd MWJBHL	Lost final
1982–83	42	23	19	0	—	257	228	46	4th MWJBHL	Lost semi-final
1983–84	42	18	25	0	—	200	223	36	5th MWJBHL	Lost quarter-final
1984–85	42	22	18	2	—	202	192	44	5th MWJBHL	Lost quarter-final
1985–86	40	18	20	2	—	229	206	38	4th MWJBHL	Lost semi-final
1986–87	41	22	18	1	—	222	206	45	4th MWJBHL	Lost semi-final
1987–88	48	23	24	1	—	236	249	47	5th MWJBHL	Lost quarter-final
1988–89	48	11	35	2	—	184	290	24	8th MWJBHL	Lost quarter-final
1989–90	48	21	26	1	—	225	224	43	6th MWJBHL	Lost quarter-final
1990–91	48	24	23	1	—	190	200	49	6th MWJBHL	Lost quarter-final
1991–92	48	39	6	3	—	270	134	81	1st MWJBHL	Won League, won Sutherland Cup
1992–93	48	41	7	0	—	339	168	82	1st MWJBHL	Won League
1993–94	48	17	29	2	—	178	220	36	7th MWJBHL	Lost quarter-final
1994–95	48	17	27	4	—	203	229	38	8th MWJBHL	Lost semi-final
1995–96	48	28	16	4	—	269	178	60	5th MWJBHL	Lost semi-final
1996–97	48	30	13	5	—	256	165	65	3rd MWJBHL	Lost semi-final
1997–98	48	30	15	3	—	259	128	63	4th MWJBHL	Lost quarter-final
1998–99	48	20	22	6	—	216	219	46	6th MWJBHL	Lost quarter-final
1999–00	48	27	20	1	—	218	185	55	5th MWJBHL	Lost quarter-final
2000–01	48	26	19	3	—	235	179	55	6th MWJBHL	Lost quarter-final
2001–02	48	17	28	3	—	160	178	37	7th MWJBHL	
2002–03	48	29	14	5	2	231	148	65	2nd MWJBHL	Lost final
2003–04	48	31	12	3	2	188	153	67	2nd MWJBHL	Lost final
2004–05	48	31	13	2	2	178	118	66	1st MWJBHL	
2005–06	48	24	24	0	—	169	161	48	7th MWJBHL	Lost quarter-final
2006–07	48	21	23	2	2	158	162	46	5th MWJBHL	Lost quarter-final
2007–08	48	21	21	1	5	167	163	48	6th GOJHL-MW	Lost Conf. Quarter-final
2008–09	52	34	14	—	4	240	172	72	2nd GOJHL-MW	Lost Conf. Final
2009–10	51	16	34	—	1	153	231	33	8th GOJHL-MW	Lost Conf. Quarter-final
2010–11	51	25	24	—	2	179	164	52	6th GOJHL-MW	
2011–12	51	10	33	—	8	148	223	28	8th GOJHL-MW	Lost Conf. Quarter-final
2012–13	51	28	19	—	4	175	172	60	3rd GOJHL-MW	Lost Conf. Semi-final
2013–14	49	36	8	—	5	180	103	77	1st GOJHL-MW	Lost Conf. Semi-final
2014–15	49	34	11	—	4	201	157	72	2nd GOJHL-MW	Won Conf. Quarters, 4–1 (Cyclones); Lost Conf. Semis, 1–4 (Cullitons)
2015–16	50	44	4	1	1	244	123	90	1st of 9-MW; 1st of 26-GOJHL	Won Conf. Quarters, 4–1 (99ers); Lost Conf. Semis, 1–4 (Siskins)
2016–17	50	30	15	2	3	196	155	65	3rd of 9-MW; 9th of 27-GOJHL	Won Conf. Quarters, 4–1 (Cullitons); Lost Conf. Semis, 2–4 (Sugar Kings)
2017–18	50	24	23	1	2	160	163	51	5th of 8-MW; 15th of 26 GOJHL	Lost Conf. Quarters, 3-4 (Siskins)

== Sutherland Cup appearances ==
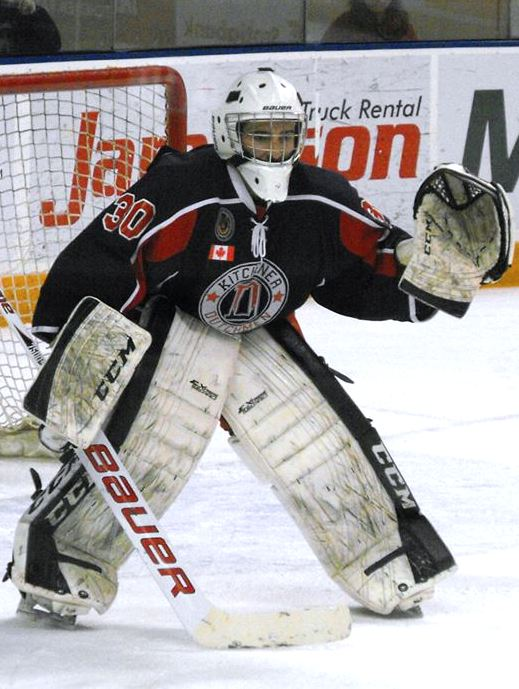
Dutchmen goalie 2013-14 season.

1965: Kitchener Greenshirts defeated Etobicoke Indians 4-games-to-2
1967: Kitchener Greenshirts defeated Dixie Beehives 4-games-to-2
1992: Kitchener Dutchmen defeated Milton Merchants 4-games-to-1
1993: Barrie Colts defeated Kitchener Dutchmen 4-games-to-none

== George S. Dudley Trophy Super "C" appearances ==
1971: Woodstock Navy-Vets defeated Kitchener Ranger B's 4-games-to-2
1973: Woodstock Navy-Vets defeated Kitchener Ranger B's 4-games-to-3 with 1 tie

== Notable alumni ==
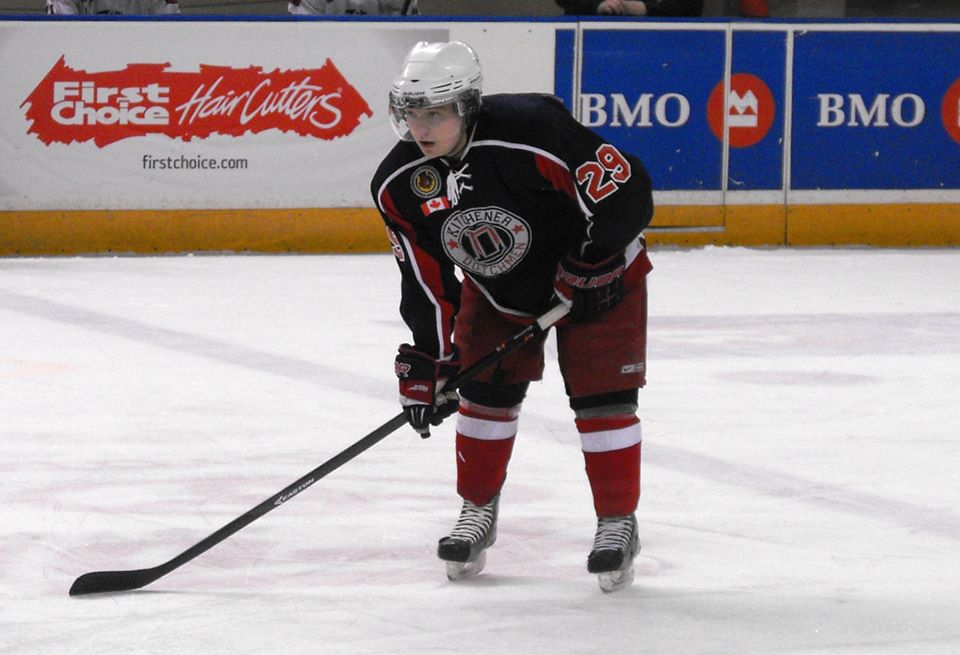
Dutchmen player 2013-14 season.

Dutchmen Logo until 2009.

- Chris Ahrens
- Braeden Bowman
- Jerry Byers
- Jonathan Cheechoo
- Dave Cressman
- Jack Egers
- Mike Hoffman
- Jim Krulicki
- Gary Kurt
- Don Maloney
- Joe McDonnell
- Rich Peverley
- Mike Robitaille
- Mark Scheifele
- Dan Seguin
- Scott Stevens
- Walt Tkaczuk
- Scott Walker
- Bennett Wolf
