= Ayr Centennials =

Canadian junior ice hockey team

- City: Ayr, Ontario
- League: Greater Ontario Hockey League
- Conference: Mid-Western
- Founded: 1982
- Home arena: North Dumfries Community Complex
- Colours: Red, Black, Silver, White
- General manager: Jeff Grimwood
- Head coach: Cody Hall

Franchise history
- 2020: Purchased Kitchener Dutchmen Franchise

Championships
- League champions: 2013, 2015, 2016, 2017
- Clarence Schmalz Cups: 2016, 2017

The Ayr Centennials are a Canadian Junior ice hockey team based in Ayr, Ontario. They play in the Greater Ontario Hockey League of the Ontario Hockey Association.

== History ==
The Ayr Centennials were founded in 1982 as members of the Southern Junior D Hockey League. Clarence Eby, whose son and grandson would become heavily involved with the team, was a founding member of the club in 1982. In 1985, Eby's son Don started volunteering with the club. Don's legacy with the team began when son Scott started playing for the team at the age of 15, but Don's wife Julie waited a few years before joining her husband, taking over for her father-in-law Clarence as treasurer. Working in many capacities with the team, the pair ran the Cens' operations through most of the 1990s, which included paying the team's bills.

In 1988, the Southern League merged with the Western Junior D Hockey League. In 1991, the Junior D rank was vacated and the league was replaced with the OHA Junior Development League. This league lasted up until 2006 when it was vacated and the Southern Ontario Junior Hockey League was created.

The Centennials had success in the Southern League but failed to win any league titles.

In the bloated Western League and Development League, the Centennials did exceptionally well but still failed to make a dent. In fact, despite finishing in the top ten teams of the league ten times in nineteen years, the Centennials never made the superleague's final once.

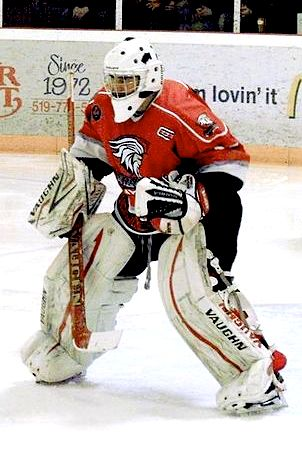
Centennials goalie in 2013.

=== Early 2000s struggles ===
In the early-2000s, the Centennials lost their touch for winning. In the last year of the OHAJDL in 2005-06, they had their worst season ever, winning only 2 games in 36 tries and finishing dead last. In three seasons, from 2005 to 2007, they only won 17 games. The team was at that point where it was ready to fold.

=== Return to prominence ===
Since joining the SOJHL in 2006, the Centennials have improved every season. In 2006-07 they finished 17th with 6 wins. In 2008-09 they finished 15th with 11 wins. In 2008-09 they really came together and had their best season in years, winning 18 games and finishing 7th. In 2009-10 the Centennials continued to improve with a 21-11-4 record, solidifying 3rd overall in the SOJHL.

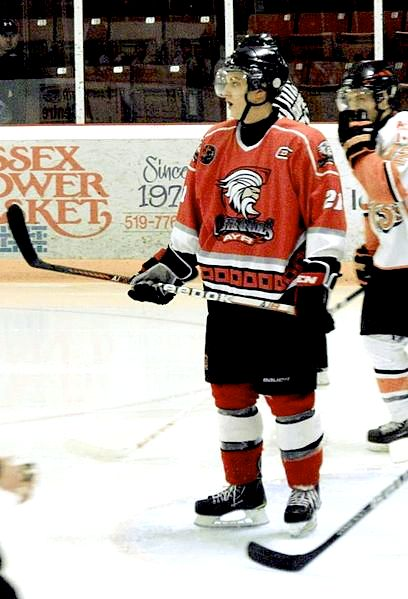
Michael Wilkins in 2013.

In the summer of 2010, the Bauer conference dissolved, leaving Thamesford, Ayr, Tavistock, Port Stanley and Wellesley to disperse into the remaining McConnell and Yeck Conferences. The 2010-11 season saw the Centennials best season since 1983-84. Finishing 4th overall in the SOJHL, the Centennials were the McConnell Conference Champions and advanced to the OHA Cup versus Thamesford, eventually losing in 4 games.

In 2011-12 the Centennials finished 4th in the McConnell Conference and 7th overall in the SOJHL, and lost to the eventual OHA Cup Finalists, The Hagersville Hawks, in 5 games of the second round of playoffs.

=== Promotion to Junior C and Schmalz Cup ===
In the summer of 2012, the Centennials and the SOJHL were promoted to Junior C to compete for the Schmalz Cup. On March 12, 2013, the Centennials won the first ever SOJHL Jr. C championship with a 4-game-sweep over the Lambeth Lancers.

In the Spring of 2013, the Centennials were moved over to the Niagara & District Junior C Hockey League in a major realignment. They were realigned again weeks after and ended up in the Midwestern Junior C Hockey League. Just three seasons removed from their jump to Junior C, the team won their first Schmalz Cup in 2016 by sweeping the Empire B Junior C Hockey League champion Port Hope Panthers in four games on the shoulders of starting goalie, Mitch Figueiredo.

In June 2016, Don and Julie Eby were awarded the OHA's highest award for volunteering, the golden stick. The team's home at the North Dumfries Community Complex sits on what used to be 30 acres of their farmland. It was back in 2009 that a former city councillor approached them about giving up the back lot of their land to build the NDCC, forever tying them to the team that they have given 30 years of service. The couple has been the ambassadors for the Centennials in that time, holding several positions on the executive – Don was assistant general manager and general manager, while Julie was treasurer – and, during the 2016 playoffs, were operating the ticket sales and door. Their son Scott was the team's head coach.

For the 2016-17 season the eight Junior "C" hockey leagues in Southern Ontario amalgamated into one league, the Provincial Junior Hockey League. The Midwestern League were placed in the Central Conference and re-branded the Pat Doherty division.

=== Purchase of Kitchener Dutchmen and promotion to Junior B ===
In April 2020, it was announced that the Centennials had purchased the Kitchener Dutchmen with the intention of acquiring their place in the Greater Ontario Junior Hockey League, thus promoting the team to Junior B status.

== Season-by-season record ==
Season	GP	W	L	T	OTL	GF	GA	P	Results	Playoffs
1982-83	36	21	12	3	-	--	--	45	2nd SJDHL	
1983-84	36	22	10	4	-	--	--	48	1st SJDHL	
1984-85	35	10	22	3	-	--	--	23	6th SJDHL	
1985-86	32	17	11	4	-	--	--	28	3rd SJDHL	
1986-87	40	22	14	4	-	--	--	48	2nd SJDHL	
1987-88	30	15	9	6	-	--	--	36	2nd SJDHL	
1988-89	35	15	15	5	-	213	178	35	12th WJDHL	
1989-90	35	21	8	6	-	220	181	48	4th WJDHL	
1990-91	39	26	11	1	1	233	210	54	4th WJDHL	
1991-92	35	14	18	0	3	195	222	31	11th OHAJDL	
1992-93	40	23	12	5	0	245	162	51	4th OHAJDL	
1993-94	40	21	14	5	-	233	170	47	7th OHAJDL	
1994-95	39	19	18	1	1	217	209	40	10th OHAJDL	
1995-96	40	20	18	2	0	192	182	42	8th OHAJDL	
1996-97	40	18	19	2	1	164	183	39	12th OHAJDL	
1997-98	36	19	10	6	1	165	126	45	7th OHAJDL	
1998-99	38	22	12	4	0	222	141	48	6th OHAJDL	
1999-00	38	26	10	1	1	200	125	54	6th OHAJDL	
2000-01	40	25	13	2	0	--	--	52	7th OHAJDL	
2001-02	40	16	18	6	0	181	182	38	12th OHAJDL	
2002-03	40	22	14	2	2	175	151	48	5th OHAJDL	
2003-04	40	12	22	4	2	138	171	30	16th OHAJDL	
2004-05	39	9	25	1	4	140	195	23	15th OHAJDL	
2005-06	36	2	32	1	1	100	252	6	17th OHAJDL	
2006-07	42	6	31	0	5	113	241	17	17th SOJHL	
2007-08	42	11	26	-	5	127	215	27	15th SOJHL	
2008-09	40	18	17	-	5	151	161	41	7th SOJHL	
2009-10	36	21	11	-	4	181	143	46	6th SOJHL	
2010-11	35	22	11	-	2	168	134	46	4th SOJHL	
2011-12	35	20	10	-	5	191	123	45	7th SOJHL	
Southern Ontario Junior Hockey League - Jr "C"
2012-13	38	29	7	-	2	220	119	60	1st SOJHL-Mc	Won League, Lost CSC QF
2013-14	40	31	6	-	3	182	99	65	2nd MWJCHL	Won Quarters - 4-0 - (Bulldogs); Won Semi's - 4-3 - (Firebirds); Lost Finals - 2-4 - (Mounties)
2014-15	40	32	8	0	-	229	92	64	1st MWJCHL	Won Quarters - 4-0 - (Applejacks); Won Semi's - 4-0 - (Mounties); Won League Finals - 4-0 (Merchants); Won CSC Quarter-finals, 4-2 (Grimsby); Lost CSC Semi-finals, 1-4 (Essex)
2015-16	40	33	6	1	-	229	92	64	1st of 9 MWJCHL	Won Quarters - 4-1 - (Bulldogs); Won Semifinals, 4-0 (Applejacks); Won League Finals 4-1 (Firebirds); Won CSC Quarter-finals, 4-1 (Grimsby); Won CSC Semifinals, 4-0 (Essex); Won CSC Finals, 4-0 (Port Hope)
2016-17	40	37	3	0	-	302	98	74	1st of 9-PJHL; Dougherty Div	Won Div. Quarters - 4-0 - (Bulldogs); Won Div. Semifinals -4-0 (Merchants); Won Div. Finals, 4-0 (Mounties); Won Conf. Finals, 4-0 (Grimsby); Won Schmalz Cup Semifinals, 4-3 Essex; Won Schmalz Cup Finals, 4-2 (Port Hope)
2017-18	40	31	5	1	3	218	98	66	1st of 9-PJHL; Dougherty Div	Won Div. Quarters, 4-0,(Bulldogs); Won Div. Semifinal, 4-3 (Mounties); Lost Div. Final, 3-4 (Braves)
2018-19	40	19	19	2	0	158	140	40	6th of 9-PJHL; Dougherty Div	Lost Div. Quarters, 0-4,(Applejacks)
2019-20	40	25	13	1	1	240	129	52	3rd of 9-PJHL; Dougherty Div	Won Div. Quarters, 4-1,(Merchants); Lost Div. Semis, 2-4 (Applejacks)
move to JR "B" - GREATER ONTARIO JUNIOR HOCKEY LEAGUE
2020-21	Season Lost due to COVID-19 pandemic									
2021-22	48	22	19	3	4	151	151	51	5th of 8-MWC; 14th of 25 GOJHL	Lost Quarters 0-4 (Warriors)
2022-23	50	28	19	2	1	177	149	59	5th of 8-MWC; 9th of 25 GOJHL	Lost Quarters 2-4 (Sugar Kings)
2023-24	50	30	19	0	1	188	150	61	5th of 8-MWC; 13th of 23 GOJHL	Won Quarters 4-2 (Siskins); Lost Conf Semifinals, 0-4 (Cyclones)
2024-25	50	35	13	0	2	213	147	72	2nd of 11 East Conf; 4th of 23 GOJHL	Lost Quarters 3-4 (Titans)
2025-26	50	19	27	2	2	164	199	42	7th of 11 East Conf; 17th of 23 GOJHL	Lost Quarters 1-4 (Falcons)

== Clarence Schmalz Cup appearances ==
Junior "C" Southern Ontario Championships

2016: Ayr Centennials defeated Port Hope Panthers 4-games-to-none
2017: Ayr Centennials defeated Port Hope Panthers 4-games-to-2
