= Burford Bulldogs =

Canadian junior ice hockey team

- City: Burford, Ontario
- League: Provincial Junior Hockey League
- Conference: South
- Division: Pat Doherty
- Founded: 1988
- Folded: 2022
- Home arena: Burford Arena & Community Centre
- Colours: Orange, Black, White
- President: Terry Chant
- General manager: Vacant
- Affiliate: None

Championships
- League champions: None
- OHA Cups: None

The Burford Bulldogs were a Canadian Junior Hockey team based in Burford, Ontario, Canada. They played in the Provincial Junior Hockey League.

== History ==
The Burford Bulldogs were founded in 1988 after a long layoff of junior hockey in the town of Burford. The previous team to play in Burford was the Burford Knights in the mid to late 1970s.

As members of the new Southern Ontario merger Western Junior D Hockey League, the Bulldogs found themselves sandwiched in with 17 other teams. In only their second season, 1989–90, the Bulldogs celebrated their first winning season with 19 wins and 12 losses with 4 ties. A season later they did the same with 22 wins, 15, losses, and 3 extra points. In 1991-92 they had their best season ever with 25 wins and 10 losses, finishing 4th overall.

In 2006-07, the OHA Junior Development League was disbanded and the Southern Ontario Junior Hockey League was created in its place.

After significant restructuring in the Summer of 2013, the Bulldogs found themselves in the Midwestern Junior C Hockey League.

As of 2016-17 season, the eight Junior "C" hockey leagues in Ontario amalgamated into one league, the Provincial Junior Hockey League. The teams formerly occupying the Midwestern League were placed in the South Conference and re-branded the Pat Doherty division.

As a result of the COVID-19 pandemic and poor support, the Bulldogs surrendered their playoff position, and folded at the end of the 2021-2022 season. The Bulldogs were winless within this season.

== Season-by-season results ==
Season	GP	W	L	T	OTL	GF	GA	P	Results	Playoffs
1988-89	35	14	20	1	-	184	208	29	13th WJDHL	
1989-90	35	19	12	4	-	217	177	42	9th WJDHL	
1990-91	40	22	15	2	1	248	226	47	6th WJDHL	
1991-92	35	25	10	0	0	262	166	50	4th OHAJDL	
1992-93	40	15	20	4	1	160	181	35	11th OHAJDL	
1993-94	40	14	24	2	-	188	240	30	11th OHAJDL	
1994-95	40	19	19	1	1	176	208	40	11th OHAJDL	
1995-96	40	19	17	1	3	202	200	42	9th OHAJDL	
1996-97	39	11	25	0	3	177	270	25	15th OHAJDL	
1997-98	37	21	14	2	0	198	167	44	8th OHAJDL	
1998-99	38	14	24	0	0	148	192	28	15th OHAJDL	
1999-00	38	16	15	2	5	181	172	39	10th OHAJDL	
2000-01	40	25	12	2	1	--	--	53	6th OHAJDL	
2001-02	40	19	16	3	2	160	147	43	9th OHAJDL	
2002-03	40	16	20	2	2	141	172	36	12th OHAJDL	
2003-04	40	16	18	5	1	133	159	38	12th OHAJDL	
2004-05	40	11	21	4	4	126	147	30	15th OHAJDL	
2005-06	38	10	22	4	2	150	182	26	15th OHAJDL	
2006-07	42	22	17	0	3	193	199	47	8th SOJHL	
2007-08	42	24	14	-	4	187	152	52	7th SOJHL	
2008-09	40	12	21	-	7	152	182	31	11th SOJHL	
2009-10	36	13	21	-	2	131	170	28	11th SOJHL	
2010-11	35	12	21	-	2	123	161	26	13th SOJHL	
2011-12	35	11	21	-	3	125	171	27	11th SOJHL	
Southern Ontario Junior Hockey League - Jr "C"
2012-13	38	19	16	-	3	180	162	41	4th SOJHL-Mc	Lost Quarter - 2-4 Braves
2013-14	40	13	26	-	1	130	219	27	7th MWJCHL	Lost Quarter - 0-4 - (Centennials)
2014-15	40	20	20	0	-	133	158	40	6th MWJCHL	Lost Quarter - 2-4 - (Merchants)
2015-16	40	9	31	0	-	128	200	18	8th of 8 MWJCHL	Lost Quarter - 1-4 - (Centennials)
2016-17	40	6	33	1	-	115	279	13	8th of 9 Dougherty Div-PJHL	Lost Div. Quarter, 0-4 (Centennials)
2017-18	40	4	36	-	-	76	318	8	8th of 9 Dougherty Div-PJHL	Lost Div. Quarter, 0-4 (Centennials)
2018-19	40	2	37	-	1	59	290	9	9th of 9 Dougherty Div-PJHL	Did not qualify
2019-20	40	5	33	1	1	87	284	12	8th of 9 Dougherty Div-PJHL	Lost Quarter, 0-4 (Braves)
2019-20	Season cancelled due to the COVID-19 pandemic									
2021-22	36	0	33	1	2	67	232	3	7th of 7 Dougherty Div-PJHL	Forfeit Playoffs

== Notable alumni ==
- Jay Wells
