= Woodstock Navy Vets =

Canadian junior ice hockey team

Woodstock Navy-Vets
- City: Woodstock, Ontario
- League: Greater Ontario Hockey League
- Conference: West
- Founded: 1966
- Home arena: Woodstock District Community Complex
- Colours: Navy blue and white
- Owner: Community Board of Directors - Devon Young (President)
- General manager: Darren Young
- Head coach: Andy Bathgate (2026-27)
- Website: www.woodstocknavyvets.ca

Franchise history
- 1966–2007: Woodstock Navy Vets
- 2007–2010: Woodstock Renegades
- 2010–present: Woodstock Navy Vets

The Woodstock Navy Vets are a junior hockey team based in Woodstock, Ontario, Canada. They are members of the Greater Ontario Hockey League of the Ontario Hockey Association.

The team was known as the Woodstock Renegades for three seasons from 2007–08 to 2009–10.

The team was preceded by the Woodstock Warriors who were an OHA Junior B team in the Central and Western leagues from 1951–52 to 1961–62, winning the Sutherland Cup emblematic of Provincial Junior B Champions in the 1954–55 season with a team that included future NHL player and Hall of Famer Bobby Hull as well as famed hockey father Walter Gretzky.

== History ==
The Woodstock Navy Vets were founded in 1966 and played in the OHA-C Group III (Intercounty Junior C Hockey League - IJCHL). In 1971–72 the Navy Vets became a member of the Western Junior B Hockey League when the IJCHL disbanded before moving the following season to the Central Junior C Hockey League. In 1976–77 the Navy Vets became a charter member of the new Southwestern Junior B Hockey League along with the London Diamonds, St. Thomas Colonels, Tillsonburg Mavericks, Simcoe Jets, and Brantford Penguins. The SWJBHL folded after two seasons and the Navy Vets joined the Niagara & District Junior C Hockey League for the 1978–79 season where they played until 2012–13. The OHA realigned the NDJHL and SOJHL Junior C leagues in the summer of 2013 and forming a new MWJCHL. The Navy Vets were a member of the new league along with Norwich, New Hamburg, and Paris from the NDJHL West along with Ayr, Burford, Delhi, Tavistock and Wellesley from the SOJHL. In the summer of 2016 with the eight leagues from Southern Ontario joining to create the single Provincial Junior Hockey League, the former leagues became divisions of the PJHL. The Midwestern League re-branded as the Doherty Division and became members of the South Conference.

=== 1969: Championship season ===
The Navy Vets won their only OHA Junior C championship in the 1968–69 season, eliminating Dresden 4 games-to-0 in the quarter-final and New Hamburg 4 games-to-1 in the semi-final before beating Oakville Blades in seven games in the final.

=== 1984 ===
After finishing in fourth place in the 1983–84 NDJCHL West regular season with a record of 13 wins, 9 losses, and 8 ties, the Navy Vets played sixty-five games that season and six rounds of playoffs. In the division quarter-finals, the Navy-Vets drew the New Hamburg Spirit 83's. The best-of-5 series went the distance, Woodstock taking it in the end 3-games-to-2. In the division semi-final, the Navy-Vets then took on the Dundas Blues. The Blues were tough early, but the Navy-Vets had all the momentum and took the series 4-games-to-2. They next played the well rested and top ranked Norwich Merchants in the division final. The Merchants, like the Blues, were tough early in the series but the Navy-Vets were tougher winning 4-games-to-2. They next had to play the Stoney Creek Warriors in the Niagara District championship. The Warriors were tough and dominated much of the play. The series went back and forth, and ended up going to a final and deciding seventh game. Woodstock fought hard and took Stoney Creek into overtime. Early in the second overtime, Woodstock would break the hearts of the Stoney Creek faithful in their own arena and win 6–5. From this point on, the Woodstock Sentinel-Review referred to the 1983–84 edition of this team as "The Cardiac Kids". With the win, the Navy-Vets were catapulted into the OHA Junior C semi-finals. Their opponents would be the Dresden Jr. Kings of the Great Lakes Junior C Hockey League. Dresden took game one big, 10–4. Game two went to Woodstock in double overtime (4–3) and game three in single overtime (8–6). Dresden came back and put Woodstock's backs against the wall with 4–2 and 7–2 victories, leaving the Cardiac Kids in a do-or-die situation. Woodstock responded and won 6–5 and 6–2 to win the series. They then moved on to face the Penetang Kings of the Georgian Bay Junior C Hockey League in the provincial final. Penetang had just knocked off the Bowmanville Eagles 4-games-to-3. Unfortunately for the Cardiac Kids, the Kings had no intention of losing, taking the series in four games: 8–7 in overtime, 6–5, 9–6, and 9–1. The fairy tale run was over for the Navy Vets, as they walked away Niagara West champions, Niagara & District champions, and OHA Junior C finalists.

=== 2002: OHA semi-finalists ===
The 2001–02 Navy Vets won 25 games and had 52 points to finish in 1st place in the West Division during the regular season by 10 points over rival Norwich Merchants. They beat New Hamburg Firebirds in 6 games in the West Division Semi-Finals and then knocked off Norwich in 5 games to win the West Division title. They then upset the East Division champ Chippawa Riverhawks, who had an identical season record as the Vets, in 6 games to win the Niagara District Junior C Hockey League championships and move on to the OHA Semi-Finals against the Great Lakes Junior C Hockey League champion Essex. The series was hard-fought with the Navy Vets finally succumbing in 4 games. The team captured the enthusiasm of the city during their late season heroics with fan support building in numbers and noise with each playoff victory to a peak in the 2 games at Southwood Arena for the OHA SF that saw over 2000 fans at each game. The Navy Vets were led up front by the trio of Jeremy Demarest, Chad Paton, and Matt Carey. Demarest won the West Division scoring title with 62 points and a division-high 40 assists. Demarest also was named Most Sportsmanlike in the West Division. Forward Taylor Winkler was among the league leaders in hits. The blueline was anchored by Chris Corriveau, Scott Roode, and Sean McLaren. The goaltending tandem of Mike Matika & Matt Richardson provided stellar goaltending all season finishing 2nd in the West Division in Goals Against. The team was led by West Division Coach of the Year Scott Brooks.

Renegades logo

=== 2007: Renegades ===
On April 27, 2007, new team owner Bill McLeod announced that the team would be changing its name to the 'Woodstock Renegades', effective the start of the 2007–2008 season, ending a 41-year relationship with the Oxford County Naval Veterans Association. The team played its first game as the Woodstock Renegades in September 2007.

Navy Vets logo

=== 2010: Navy Vets return ===
On March 31, 2010, team owner Bill McLeod announced that the team would be adopting the Navy Vets moniker once again effective the start of the 2010–2011 season. Along with the name change would be a new look, including a new logo (pictured on the right). However, on August 16, 2010, it was announced that the new logo would not be adopted and that the team would be using the original Navy Vets logo.

On August 17, 2010, it was announced that Bill McLeod had stepped down as team owner & GM/Head Coach and Jeff Morrison would take over as Director of Hockey Operations/GM/Head Coach. In addition, it was announced that a process had begun to turn the team into a non-profit organization, returning the hockey team to its roots as a community-owned team.

=== 2012: Coaching changes ===
On December 10, 2012, Jeff Morrison resigned as GM-head coach of the Navy Vets for personal reasons. Assistant Coach Mark Jones assumed the head coach position, but then resigned at the end of the month. Frank Mueller took over as GM-head coach in January 2013.

=== 2013: Organizational changes ===
On April 15, 2013, a local group of Woodstock community members represented the Navy Vets as its board of directors. On December 19, 2013, there was a coaching staff change with former Navy Vet Adam Wallace being named head coach replacing Frank Mueller and Bill Wallace and Geoff Killing being named assistant coaches replacing Rob Hutchison.

=== 2015 ===
The Navy Vets in the 2014–15 season had a 16-win improvement. Mike Gillespie led the team in scoring for the 2nd straight season and finished in 6th place in league scoring with 45 points on 26 goals. He was named the MWJCHL Most Valuable Player. Head Coach Adam Wallace was named the MWJCHL Coach of the Year for leading the team to its season. Goalie Michael Roefs tied a team record with 3 shutouts and combined with rookie Jackson Swindells and AP North Davies for a team record total of 6 shutouts. Captain Jake Schneider, Dylan Wettlaufer, and Justin Elms also finished in the league's top 25 scorers. The team had an 8-game winning streak in November. They finished in 5th place and took 4th place defending champion Paris Mounties to 7 games in the quarterfinals before their turn-around season came to an end. Over 10000 fans came through the gate to watch the team for 23 games (20 reg.season & 3 playoff) this season - an average of 448 well over that of any season in the last decade.

=== 2015–16: 50th anniversary season ===
The Navy Vets unveiled a new logo and jerseys for their 50th anniversary season. The team held an Alumni night in December with many former Navy Vets returning for a celebration. Woodstock also hosted the MWJCHL Showcase in January, with a Navy Vets Alumni Team playing a MWJCHL All-Star Team prior to the MWJCHL Prospects Game.

=== 2016–17 ===
The Navy Vets 16-yr old Andrew Bruder was named PJHL Doherty Division Rookie of the Year.

=== 2017–18 ===
The Navy Vets won 30 games for only the 4th time in their history. Their season attendance total was 10504 for a 525 AVG during 40-game reg.season most in Doherty Division and 2nd in PJHL (only 3rd OHA Jr C team to reach 10000). They also advanced to the semi-finals for the 1st time since 2010.

=== 2019–20 ===
The playoffs finals for the 2019–20 season were cancelled due to the COVID-19 pandemic, after the Vets had been eliminated in the semi-finals.

=== 2021–22 ===
The Navy Vets won the Doherty Division Regular Season Title for the 1st time in 20 years. Captain Kyle Baker won the Doherty Scoring Title with 75 points (the most by a Vet since 1998) with a PJHL league-leading 50 assists and was named Doherty Division MVP. Patrick Klazer led the division in scoring by a defenceman with 11 goals and 40 points, and Nolan Brett led all division rookies in scoring with 38 points, while Caden Bower (2nd) and Christian Pelley (9th) also finished in the Top-10 scorers. Veteran overage goalie Keaghan Brett led the division with 17 wins. The team passed the 10000 total attendance mark (500+ per game average) for the 4th straight season and 6th time in last 7 years) which was 2nd best in the PJHL. But the promising season came to a disappointing end when they lost to New Hamburg in Game#7 of the semi-finals at home.

=== 2023–24 ===
The Navy Vets won 31 games for the 1st time since 1997 and only 4th time in team history. Davin Gray won the Doherty Scoring Title with 63 points with a Doherty division-leading 47 assists. Tyler Bouck led the division with a 2.45 GAA, a .927 SV%, 5 shutouts, and was 2nd with 19 wins. Nolan Brett finished runner-up in scoring including 29 goals (only the 2nd time since Mike Stevenson had 30 in 1999 - Kyle Walker also had 29 in 2018) while Ethan Szabo was 8th. The team had a PJHL league total attendance (reg.season & playoffs) record of 21866 (754 per game average) and passed the 10000 mark for the 6th straight season and 8th time in last 9 years. But the terrific season came to a disappointing end when they lost to New Hamburg in 5 games in their 1st trip to the division finals since 2007.

=== 2025–26 ===
The Navy Vets won 29 games to win the Doherty Division Regular Season Pennant for the 2nd time in 4 seasons. Owen Ireton won the Doherty Scoring title with 75 points tied for the division lead with 36 goals. Rookie Kobe Nadalin Tyler Bouck led the division with a 2.04 GAA and a .945 SV%, while overage teammate Tyler Bouck led the division with 17 wins and 5 shutouts. Charlie Barnes led all defencemen in scoring with 22 goals and 36 assists for 58 points. Cooper Vickerman also had 33 goals. The team finished 3rd in PJHL league total attendance (reg.season & playoffs) with 19228 to pass the 10000 mark for the 8th straight season. But the terrific season came to a heart-breaking end with a 4-3 loss to Tavistock Braves in game#7 of the Doherty Division Championship Series. The Vets won 6 awards - Owen Ireton MVP & Leading Scorer, Charley Barnes Top Defenceman, Tyler Bouck Top Goalie, Kobe Nadalin Top Rookie, and Bouck & Nadalin combined for Best Team Goaltending (GAA).

It was announced on March 4, 2026 that the Navy Vets will be joining the Greater Ontario Hockey League (GOHL) as an expansion team for the 2026-27 season.

== Jr. Vets ==
The logo for the "Jr. Vets" used by the Woodstock Minor Hockey Association teams was designed by Woodstock-based Graphic Designer, Bill Bowman.

== Season-by-season record ==
Note: GP = Games Played, W = Wins, L = Losses, T = Ties, OTL = Overtime Losses, GF = Goals for, GA = Goals against

Season	GP	W	L	T	OTL	GF	GA	Points	Finish	Playoffs
1966–67	30	20	7	3	-	146	89	41	2nd ICJCHL	Won League, Lost OHA QF
1967–68	31	25	5	1	-	145	68	51	1st ICJCHL	Lost Final
1968–69	22	16	3	3	-	--	--	35	1st ICJCHL	Won League, Won CSC
1969–70	30	18	8	4	-	191	144	40	2nd ICJCHL	Lost Final, Lost Super C Final
1970–71	23	17	2	4	-	142	82	38	1st ICJCHL	Won League, Won Super C Final
1971–72	39	11	23	5	-	156	209	27	7th WJBHL	DNQ
1972–73	32	16	11	5	-	--	--	37	4th CJCHL	Lost SF, Won Super C Final
1973–74	31	26	3	2	-	246	87	54	1st CJCHL	Won League, Won Super C Final
1974–75	36	32	2	2	-	315	99	66	1st CJCHL III	Lost SF, Won Super C Final
1975–76	31	20	7	4	-	235	117	44	2nd CJCHL III	Lost Final, Won Super C Final
1976–77	38	17	18	3	-	215	200	37	3rd SWJBHL	Lost SF to Brantford 4-3
1977–78	40	15	23	2	-	192	215	32	5th SWJBHL	DNQ
1978–79	38	13	19	6	-	--	--	32	4th NJC-W	
1979–80	41	9	31	1	-	--	--	19	6th NJC-W	DNQ
1980–81	32	23	6	3	-	--	--	49	1st NJC-W	Won League, Lost OHA SF
1981–82	31	19	10	2	-	--	--	40	2nd NJC-W	
1982–83	36	26	7	3	-	--	--	55	1st NJC-W	Won Division. Lost Final
1983–84	30	13	9	8	-	--	--	33	4th NJC-W	Won League, Lost OHA F
1984–85	30	17	10	3	-	170	126	37	2nd SWJCHL	Won Division, Lost Final
1985–86	36	10	17	9	-	--	--	29	4th NJC-W	
1986–87	33	15	14	4	-	--	--	34	3rd NJC-W	
1987–88	36	25	6	4	-	--	--	55	2nd NJC-W	Won Division, Lost Final
1988–89	36	19	10	7	-	--	--	45	3rd NJC-W	Won Division, Lost Final
1989–90	36	14	14	8	-	--	--	36	4th NJC-W	
1990–91	34	7	22	5	-	--	--	19	6th NJC-W	DNQ
1991–92	35	13	18	4	-	162	158	30	5th NJC-W	
1992–93	36	29	2	5	-	247	121	63	1st NJC-W	Won Division, Lost Final
1993–94	36	18	12	6	-	177	146	42	3rd NJC-W	Won Division, Lost OHA QF
1994–95	36	28	5	3	-	243	112	59	1st NJC-W	Won League, Lost OHA SF
1995–96	40	33	4	3	-	258	102	69	1st NJC-W	Lost Division F
1996–97	40	32	4	3	1	214	93	68	1st NJC-W	
1997–98	39	22	13	4	0	187	157	48	3rd NJC-W	
1998–99	35	28	6	-	1	--	--	57	1st NJC-W	Won Division, Lost Final
1999–00	36	18	17	-	1	--	--	37	3rd NJC-W	Lost Div semi-final 0-4 (Merchants)
2000–01	36	18	16	1	1	--	--	38	2nd NJC-W	Won Div semi-final 4-1 (Firebirds); Lost Di final 0-4 (Merchants)
2001–02	36	25	9	1	1	--	--	52	1st NJC-W	Won Div semi-final 4-2 (Firebirds); Won Div final 4-1 (Merchants); Won League 4-2 (Riverhawks); Lost CSC semi-final 0-4 (73's)
2002–03	36	15	15	4	2	116	125	36	3rd NJC-W	Lost Division semi-final 0-4 (Storm)
2003–04	36	9	24	1	2	93	145	21	6th NJC-W	DNQ
2004–05	36	15	19	0	2	98	148	32	4th NJC-W	Lost Division semi-final 0-4 (Storm)
2005–06	36	11	20	2	3	104	148	27	4th NJC-W	Lost Division semi-final 0-4 (Storm)
2006–07	36	21	13	1	1	185	141	44	4th NJC-W	Won quarter-final 4-3 (Storm); Lost semi-final 1-4 (Merchants)
2007–08	36	15	18	2	1	155	125	33	5th NJC-W	Lost Preliminary Round 0-4 (Firebirds)
2008–09	36	20	13	-	3	119	103	43	4th NJC-W	Lost Division semi-final 2-4 (Merchants)
2009–10	36	19	13	-	4	138	123	42	3rd NJC-W	Lost Division semi-final 0-4 (Merchants)
2010–11	36	7	25	-	4	102	199	18	6th NJC-W	Lost Division quarter-final 0-4 (Merchants)
2011–12	36	8	27	-	1	107	192	17	6th NJC-W	Lost Division quarter-final 0-4 (Firebirds)
2012–13	38	6	32	-	0	89	218	12	6th NJC-W	Lost Division quarter-final 0-4 (Mounties)
2013–14	40	5	33	-	2	94	207	12	9th MWJCHL	DNQ
2014–15	40	21	19	0	-	137	105	42	5th MWJCHL	Lost quarter-final 3-4 (Mounties)
2015–16	40	17	19	4	-	119	115	38	6th of 9 MWJCHL	Lost quarter-final 2-4 (Mounties)
2016–17	40	20	18	2	-	152	136	42	6th of 9- PJHL; Doherty Div	Lost Div quarter-final 2-4 (Applejacks)
2017–18	40	30	9	0	1	200	112	61	3rd of 9- PJHL; Doherty Div	Won Div quarter-final 4-1 (Merchants); Lost Div semi-final 0-4 (Braves)
2018–19	40	17	17	2	6	145	136	40	7th of 9- PJHL; Doherty Div	Lost Div quarter-final 2-4 (Firebirds)
2019–20	40	24	12	2	2	214	119	52	4th of 9- PJHL; Doherty Div	Won Div quarter-final 4-3 (Mounties); Lost Div semi-final 0-4 (Braves)
2020-21	Season Lost due to COVID-19 pandemic									
2021–22	36	27	6	3	0	183	98	57	1st of 7 - PJHL; Doherty Div	Lost Div semi-final 3-4 (Firebirds)
2022–23	41	18	21	1	1	140	171	38	5th of 7 - PJHL; Doherty Div	Lost Div quarter-final 3-4 (Braves)
2023–24	42	31	8	3	0	167	109	65	2nd of 7 - PJHL; Doherty Div	Won Div quarter-final 4-1 (Titans); Won Div semi-final 4-1 (Merchants); Lost Div. final 1-4 (Firebirds)
2024–25	42	27	11	2	2	155	122	58	3rd of 8 Doherty Div; 6th of 16 South Conf; 19th of 63 PJHL	Won Div quarter-final 4-1 (Titans); Lost Div. semi-final 1-4 (Firebirds)
2025–26	42	29	8	4	1	171	102	63	1st of 8 Doherty Div; 3rd of 16 South Conf; 10th of 61 PJHL	Won Div quarter-final 4-0 (Dolphins); Won Div. semi-final 4-2 (Merchants); Lost Div. final 3-4 (Braves)
Expansion to GREATER ONTARIO HOCKEY LEAGUE (GOHL)

=== Playoffs ===
- 2005 Lost in West Division semifinals

Simcoe Storm defeated Woodstock Navy Vets in 4-games-to-0 West Division semifinals.

- 2006 Lost in West Division semifinals

Simcoe Storm defeated Woodstock Navy Vets 4-games-to-0 in West Division semifinals.

- 2007 Lost in West Division finals

Woodstock Navy Vets defeated Simcoe Storm 4-games-to-3 in West Division semifinals.
Norwich Merchants defeated Woodstock Navy Vets 4-games-to-1 in West Division finals.

- 2008 Lost in West Division semifinals

New Hamburg Firebirds defeated Woodstock Navy Vets 4-games-to-2 in West Division semifinals.

- 2009 Lost in West Division finals

Woodstock Navy Vets defeated New Hamburg Firebirds 4-games-to-1 in West Division semifinals.
Norwich Merchants defeated Woodstock Navy Vets 4-games-to-2 in West Division finals.

- 2010 Lost in West Division semifinals

Woodstock Navy Vets received first-round bye.
Norwich Merchants defeated Woodstock Navy Vets 4-games-to-0 in West Division semifinals.

- 2011 Lost in West Division quarter-finals

Norwich Merchants defeated Woodstock Navy Vets 4-games-to-0 in West Division quarter-finals.

- 2012 Lost in West Division quarter-finals

New Hamburg Firebirds defeated Woodstock Navy Vets 4-games-to-0 in West Division quarter-finals.

- 2013 Lost in West Division quarter-finals

Paris Mounties defeated Woodstock Navy Vets 4-games-to-0 in West Division quarter-finals.

- 2015 Lost in MWJCHL quarter-finals

Paris Mounties defeated Woodstock Navy Vets 4-games-to-3 in MWJCHL quarter-finals.

- 2016 Lost in MWJCHL quarter-finals

Paris Mounties defeated Woodstock Navy Vets 4-games-to-2 in MWJCHL quarter-finals.

- 2017 Lost in PJHL Doherty Division quarter-finals

Wellesley Applejacks defeated Woodstock Navy Vets 4-games-to-2 in PJHL Doherty Division quarter-finals.

- 2018 Lost in PJHL Doherty Division semi-finals

Woodstock Navy Vets defeated Norwich Merchants 4-games-to-1 in PJHL Doherty Division quarter-finals.
Tavistock Braves defeated Woodstock Navy Vets 4-games-to-0 in PJHL Doherty Division semi-finals.

- 2022 Lost in PJHL Doherty Division semi-finals

New Hamburg Firebirds defeated Woodstock Navy Vets 4-games-to-3 in PJHL Doherty Division semi-finals.

- 2023 Lost in PJHL Doherty Division quarter-finals

Tavistock Braves defeated Woodstock Navy Vets 4-games-to-3 in PJHL Doherty Division quarter-finals.

- 2024 Lost in PJHL Doherty Division finals

Woodstock Navy Vets defeated Paris Titans 4-games-to-1 in PJHL Doherty Division quarter-finals.
Woodstock Navy Vets defeated Norwich Merchants 4-games-to-1 in PJHL Doherty Division semi-finals.
New Hamburg Firebirds defeated Woodstock Navy Vets 4-games-to-1 in PJHL Doherty Division finals.

- 2025 Lost in PJHL Doherty Division semi-finals

Woodstock Navy Vets defeated Paris Titans 4-games-to-1 in PJHL Doherty Division quarter-finals.
New Hamburg Firebirds defeated Woodstock Navy Vets 4-games-to-1 in PJHL Doherty Division semi-finals.

- 2026 Lost in PJHL Doherty Division finals

Woodstock Navy Vets defeated Dorchester Dolphins 4-games-to-0 in PJHL Doherty Division quarter-finals.
Woodstock Navy Vets defeated Norwich Merchants 4-games-to-2 in PJHL Doherty Division semi-finals.
Tavistock Braves defeated Woodstock Navy Vets 4-games-to-3 in PJHL Doherty Division finals.

== Clarence Schmalz Cup appearances ==
1969: Woodstock Navy-Vets defeated Oakville Blades 4-games-to-3
1984: Penetang Kings defeated Woodstock Navy-Vets 4-games-to-none

== George S. Dudley Trophy Super "C" appearances ==
1970: Barrie Colts defeated Woodstock Navy-Vets 4-games-to-2
1971: Woodstock Navy-Vets defeated Kitchener Ranger B's 4-games-to-2
1973: Woodstock Navy-Vets defeated Kitchener Ranger B's 4-games-to-3 with 1 tie
1974: Woodstock Navy-Vets defeated Owen Sound Salvagemen 4-games-to-none
1975: Woodstock Navy-Vets defeated Owen Sound Salvagemen 3-games-to-none
1976: Woodstock Navy-Vets defeated Brantford Penguins 4-games-to-none

== Notable alumni ==
- Bernie Nicholls
- Len Hachborn
- Mike Craig
- Ted Long (WHA)
- Bob Langdon (former NHL referee)
- Brad Kovachik (former NHL linesman)
- Brian Paton
- Dave MacQueen
- Adam Wallace

== Woodstock born players (who never played for Navy Vets) ==
- Larry Mavety (WHA)
- Doug Shelton (NHL)
- Jake Muzzin (Former NHL player)
