= Hespeler Shamrocks =

Canadian junior ice hockey team

- Nickname: Shammies
- City: Hespeler, Ontario, Canada
- League: Provincial Junior Hockey League
- Conference: South
- Division: Doherty
- Founded: 1959
- Home arena: Hespeler Memorial Arena
- Colours: Black, Green, Yellow, and White
- General manager: Ken Brown
- Head coach: Cole Cummings
- Website: Club Website

Franchise history
- 1959–1960: Simcoe Juniors
- 1960–1962: Simcoe Pacers
- 1962–1969: Simcoe Blades
- 1969–1972: Simcoe Chargers
- 1972–1982: Simcoe Jets
- 1983–1985: Simcoe Penguins
- 1985–1988: Simcoe Rams
- 1989–2017: Simcoe Storm
- 2017–2018: Simcoe Shamrocks
- 2018–present: Hespeler Shamrocks

The Hespeler Shamrocks are a junior ice hockey team based in Hespeler, Ontario, Canada. They are currently members of the Provincial Junior Hockey League. The team was known as the Simcoe Storm from 1989-2017 and had played in Simcoe, Ontario since 1959 before relocating in 2018.

== History ==
The Simcoe Juniors were founded in 1959 as members of the Niagara District Junior B Hockey League. A season later, they took the name "Pacers".

In 1961, the Simcoe Pacers jumped to the Central Junior C Hockey League. They soon changed their names to the Simcoe Blades.

=== 1965: Championship Run ===
The Simcoe Blades finished their sixth season, fourth in the Central Jr. C league, with a record of 26 wins and only five losses. With first place clinched, the Blades met the pesky Hespeler Shamrocks in the Central League quarter-final. The Shamrocks battled hard and at one point even led in the series, but the Blades rebounded and won the series 4-games-to-2. In the league semi-final, the Blades drew the Preston Pals. The Pals were "out of their league" and were swept in three games in a best-of-five series. They then drew the Milton Merchants in the league final and defeated them four games straight to win the Central League Crown. With their league out of the way, they then moved into the Provincial play-downs. Their provincial semi-final opponent would end-up being the Point Edward Redmen, who had defeated the Port Huron junior team to advance this far. The best-of-five series was hard-fought. In game one, the Blades led 9-1 after two periods. In the third, a vicious line-brawl broke out involving all ten skaters and one goalie. Game one was one by the Blades 11-5. Game two saw the Blades come from behind to defeat the Redmen 5-2. The third game had the Blades show the Redmen exactly how good they were, as they crushed them 13-3 to take the series. In the other provincial semi-final, the Lindsay Merchants took out the Penetang Hurons 4-games-to-1 to meet the Blades in the final. The All-Ontario final took place in late April and early May 1965 between Simcoe and Lindsay. Simcoe took the first three games: 7-2, 5-1, and 3-1. Each game got closer as Lindsay grew stronger. Game four in Lindsay had the Merchants prove why they made the final, taking the game 6-5 with a huge surge in the second period. Game five was back in Simcoe on May 3. Lindsay made a game of it, leading 3-2 after the second frame. In the next period, the Blades scored the equalizer halfway through, before Doug Macaulay scored the winner with 3:34 remaining in the third in front of an estimated 1,400 fans. After only six years of existence, the Simcoe junior team won its first provincial championship.

The 1966-67 season has the Central league divide up into the Inter-county Junior C Hockey League and the Western Junior C Hockey League. The Blades went to the Inter-county league.

In 1969, the Blades folded less than 20 games into the 1968-69 Inter-county Junior C season. Their final game saw them take a 14-0 drubbing against the Ingersoll Marlands. With only nine skaters and a goalie at the game, the goaltender for the Blades quit the team at the end of the second period. Ingersoll's back up goalie played the remainder for the Blades. It would be the last game the "Blades" would ever play.

The next season, the team returned as the Simcoe Chargers.

In 1972, the team became the Jets and they joined the Central Junior C Hockey League. That season they would lose a nail-biting series to the Caledonia Corvairs, 3-games-to-2 in the league quarter-finals. The Corvairs would go on to win both the league and the OHA Junior C championship.

=== 1974: Two-time Finalists ===
The 1973-74 proved to be a strange year for the Simcoe Jets. The Jets finished the 1973-74 season in third place with 20 wins, 10 losses, and only two ties. They entered the league quarter-finals against the Hanover Barons. The series proved to be a 3-games-to-none sweep for the Jets. In the semi-final, the Jets drew the New Hamburg Hahns. The usually powerful Hahns were not up to the challenge provided by the Jets, as Simcoe won 3-games-to-1. This entered the Jets into the Central Junior C League's finals against the Woodstock Navy-Vets. The Vets took game one 3-1, the Jets took back game two 4-2. The Vets won game three 4-1, while the Jets returned the favour in the overtime of game four, 3-2. The Jets then put on the "jets" and took their first series lead with a game five 2-0 victory. Woodstock, with their backs to the wall, came back and won both games six and seven (6-4, 3-1) to win the Central league crown. But the Jets were not out, not because they won but because Woodstock was technically too big of a town to play in the OHA Junior C playdowns. Woodstock moved on to play the Owen Sound Salvagemen in the OHA Super C finals (Woodstock won 4-games-to-none) and Simcoe gained a berth to the OHA Junior C semi-finals. In the semi-finals they were greeted by the Leamington Flyers of the Great Lakes Junior C Hockey League. Simcoe lost game one, 4-2, but took the next four straight 6-5, 4-1, 11-7, and 5-3 to earn a berth into the OHA Finals. The other finalists were the Cobourg Cougars, and the Jets had a good start against them with a 5-4 victory. Game two was won 6-5 in overtime by Cobourg. Game two was won 4-3 in double overtime, but was marred by a bench clearing brawl at the end of the first overtime period. Cobourg took game four in regulation 2-1 and then crushed a defeated Jets squad 9-6 in the fifth and final game. The Jets would be two-time finalists, but not champions.

In 1974, they joined the newly formed Niagara & District Junior C Hockey League. Then in 1976, they took another crack at Junior B with the Southwestern Junior B Hockey League. After two seasons with the SWJBHL, they then jumped to the Golden Horseshoe Junior B Hockey League.

=== 1976–1980: Back in Junior B ===
In 1976, the Simcoe Jets took their franchise's second attempt at Junior B Hockey. Stepping on the ice with the Southwestern Junior B Hockey League, the Jets were promoted with the Brantford Penguins, Tillsonburg Mavericks, Woodstock Navy-Vets, London Diamonds, St. Thomas Colonels. The Jets finished the 1976-77 season with a 16-21-2 record. In the league's second and final season, the Jets finished with a near-identical record of 16-22-2. The SWJBHL was divided up, and the Jets found themselves in the Golden Horseshoe Junior B Hockey League. In their first season in the GHJHL, the Jets finished in sixth place with 13 wins, and in their second season, they finished seventh with 14 wins. After four losing seasons, the Jets elected to return to the Niagara & District Junior C Hockey League in 1980.

They were now known as the Storm and Stable, dating back to 1989. Prior to 1989, Simcoe had suffered almost annual financial strife. On top of folding in 1969, the franchise sat out the 1982-83 season as well as the 1988-89 season.

=== 2006: Niagara Champions ===
After finishing second overall in the Niagara District Junior C league regular season standings with 28 wins, six losses, and two losses in overtime, the Simcoe Storm seemed destined for great things in the 2006 playoffs. In the Western Division semi-final, the Storm drew the Woodstock Navy-Vets. The Storm crushed the Vets in four straight games. In the Western Division final, the Storm then were challenged by the Norwich Merchants. The Storm took them out, winning the series 4-games-to-1, taking the Western Division crown. Next they took on the top ranked and annual Clarence Schmalz Cup contending Grimsby Peach Kings. The Storm shocked the Peach Kings by defeating them handily, 4-games-to-1, to win the Niagara League championship and gain a berth into the provincial semi-finals. In them semi-finals, the Storm drew the defending Schmalz Cup champion Essex 73's. The 73's knocked the Storm out, sweeping them in four games.

=== 50 Years Anniversary ===
The 2008-09 season marked the 50th year since the founding of the franchise in 1959. The 2008-09 also marked the 20th anniversary of the "Storm" moniker. However, in 2017 the Storms quietly changed their name to the Shamrocks revealing green and gold uniforms at their season opener.

=== Junior C Re-Organization ===
Prior to the start of the 2016-17 season the Southern Ontario Junior C leagues amalgamated under the Provincial Junior Hockey League. All the leagues remained intact but were group into conferences (two leagues to a conference) and all leagues received a new identity. For the Storm it meant that the Niagara & District Junior C Hockey League was now the Bloomfield Division of the South Conference.

=== COVID-19 Pandemic ===
The playoffs for the 2019-20 season were cancelled due to the COVID-19 pandemic, leading to the team not being able to play a single game.

== Season-by-season results ==
Season	GP	W	L	T	OTL	GF	GA	P	Results	Playoffs
1959-60	23	6	17	0	-	80	117	12	6th NDJBHL	
1960-61	25	13	9	3	-	135	124	29	3rd NDJBHL	
1961-62	30	23	6	1	-	149	110	47	2nd CJCHL	
1962-63	30	6	16	8	-	128	194	20	5th CJCHL	
1963-64	30	23	7	0	-	164	99	46	2nd CJCHL	
1964-65	31	26	5	0	-	223	92	52	1st CJCHL	Won League, won CSC
1965-66	32	17	14	1	-	154	147	35	5th CJCHL	
1966-67	30	4	25	1	-	119	180	9	6th ICJCHL	
1967-68	31	7	23	1	-	132	182	15	5th ICJCHL	
1968-69	18	3	15	0	-	--	--	6	5th ICJCHL	Folded
1969-70	30	3	27	0	-	98	275	6	6th SCJDHL	
1970-71	30	16	14	0	-	155	163	32	3rd SCJDHL	
1971-72	28	12	15	1	-	127	120	25	5th SCJDHL	
1972-73	32	16	13	3	-	--	--	35	5th CJCHL	
1973-74	32	20	10	2	-	208	124	42	3rd CJCHL	Lost League CSC Final
1974-75	30	23	3	4	-	--	--	50	2nd NJCHL	
1975-76	36	20	14	2	-	--	--	42	3rd NJCHL	
1976-77	39	16	21	2	-	231	250	34	4th SWJBHL	
1977-78	40	16	22	2	-	212	248	34	4th SWJBHL	Lost semi-final
1978-79	42	13	23	6	-	227	275	32	6th GHJHL	
1979-80	43	14	23	6	-	220	262	34	7th GHJHL	
1980-81	32	16	13	3	-	--	--	35	3rd NJCHL	
1981-82	32	13	18	1	-	--	--	27	3rd NJC-W	
1982-83	Did Not Participate									
1983-84	40	7	31	2	-	--	--	16	5th NJC-E	
1984-85	30	1	28	1	-	81	263	3	5th SWJCHL	
1985-86	36	5	29	2	-	--	--	12	5th NJC-W	
1986-87	32	6	22	4	-	--	--	16	4th NJC-C	
1987-88	36	8	22	6	-	--	--	22	5th NJC-W	
1988-89	Did Not Participate									
1989-90	40	4	34	2	-	--	--	10	6th NJC-E	
1990-91	36	9	22	5	-	142	246	23	6th NJC-E	
1991-92	36	17	14	5	-	167	162	39	4th NJC-E	
1992-93	36	12	18	6	-	176	184	30	4th NJC-W	
1993-94	36	9	24	3	-	132	214	21	6th NJC-W	
1994-95	36	5	30	1	-	96	277	11	7th NJC-W	
1995-96	40	5	33	2	-	147	330	12	6th NJC-W	
1996-97	40	18	21	1	0	149	180	37	4th NJC-W	
1997-98	38	15	18	1	4	188	210	35	4th NJC-W	
1998-99	34	13	20	-	1	--	--	27	5th NJC-W	DNQ
1999-00	36	10	26	-	0	--	--	20	4th NJC-W	Won Div semi-final 4-1 (Firebirds)
2000-01	36	12	20	0	4	--	--	28	4th NJC-W	Lost Div semi-final 1-4 (Merchants)
2001-02	36	13	19	2	2	--	--	30	3rd NJC-W	Lost Div semi-final 1-4 (Merchants)
2002-03	36	20	12	0	3	157	132	43	4th NJCHL	Won Div semi-final 4-3 (Navy Vets); Lost Div final 1-4 (Merchants)
2003-04	36	24	9	0	3	166	110	51	3rd NJCHL	Won Div semi-final 4-1 (Firebirds); Won final 4-0 (Merchants); Lost final 0-4 (Peach Kings)
2004-05	36	26	9	0	1	146	90	53	2nd NJCHL	Won Div semi-final 4-0 (Navy Vets); Won final 4-0 (Merchants); Lost final 1-4 (Peach Kings)
2005-06	36	28	6	0	2	216	124	58	2nd NJCHL	Won quarter-final 4-0 (Navy Vets); Won semi-final 4-1 (Merchants); Won League 4-1 (Peach Kings); Lost CSC semi-final 1-4 (73's)
2006-07	36	25	7	1	3	236	135	54	2nd NJCHL	Lost quarter-final 3-4 (Navy Vets)
2007-08	36	21	12	2	1	155	123	45	4th NJCHL	Won Preliminary Round 4-0 (Mounties); Lost quarter-final 1-4 (Merchants)
2008-09	36	22	11	-	3	178	153	47	4th NJCHL	Won quarter-final 4-3 (Spitfires); Lost semi-final 1-4 (Merchants)
2009-10	36	29	5	-	2	206	115	60	1st NJCHL	Won Div quarter-final 4-2 (Firebirds); Lost Div semi-final 1-4 (Merchants)
2010-11	36	20	13	-	3	159	154	43	6th NJCHL	Won Div quarter-final 4-3 (Firebirds); Lost Div semi-final 1-4 (Merchants)
2011-12	36	17	17	-	2	143	160	36	5th NJCHL	Lost Div semi-final 1-4 (Merchants)
2012-13	38	15	20	-	3	149	166	33	4th NJC-W	Won Div quarter-final 4-3 (Spitfires); Lost Div semi-final 1-4 (Firebirds)
2013-14	35	13	22	-	0	115	169	26	7th NJCHL	Lost quarter-final 1-4 (Hawks)
2014-15	42	4	37	-	1	119	278	9	8th NJCHL	quarter-final 0-4 (Peach Kings)
2015-16	42	0	39	1	2	75	286	3	8th of 8 NJCHL	Lost quarter-final 0-4 (Rangers)
2016-17	42	3	39	0	-	87	274	6	8th of 8 Bloomfield Div-PHHL	Lost Div quarter-final 0-4 (Peach Kings)
2017-18	42	3	35	1	3	81	236	10	8th of 8 Bloomfield Div-PHHL	Lost Div quarter-final 0-4 (Rangers)
Hespeler Shamrocks
2018-19	42	7	32	1	2	68	193	17	8th of 8-PJHL; Bloomfield Div	Lost Div quarter-final 0-4 (Rangers)
2019-20	42	15	19	5	3	111	133	38	5th of 8-PJHL; Bloomfield Div	Lost Div semi-final 0-4 (Peach Kings)
2020-21	Season Lost due to COVID-19 pandemic									
2021-22	36	9	25	1	1	83	177	20	6th of 7-PJHL; Dougherty Div	Lost Div Semi-final 0-4 (Applejacks)
2022-23	41	5	32	3	2	83	205	14	7th of 7-PJHL; Dougherty Div	Lost Div semi-final 0-4 (Applejacks)
2023-24	42	12	28	2	0	124	176	26	7th of 7-PJHL; Dougherty Div	Won Div quarter-final 4-3 (Braves); Lost Div semi-final 1-4 (Firebirds)
2024-25	42	8	30	2	2	100	179	20	8th of 8 Dougherty Div; 15th of 16 South Conf; 55th of 63 PJHL	Lost Div quarter-final 0-4 (Merchants)
2025-26	42	14	24	4	0	96	164	32	6th of 8 Dougherty Div; 12th of 16 South Conf; 45th of 61 PJHL	Lost Div quarter-final 0-4 (Applejacks)

Key:

NDJBHL - Niagara District Junior B Hockey League
CJCHL - Central Junior C Hockey League
ICJCHL - Intercounty Junior C Hockey League
SCJDHL - Southern Counties Junior D Hockey League
NJCHL - Niagara & District Junior C Hockey League
SWJBHL - Southwestern Junior B Hockey League
GHJHL - Golden Horseshoe Junior B Hockey League
SWJCHL - Southwestern Junior C Hockey League
PJHL - Provincial Junior Hockey League

== Clarence Schmalz Cup appearances ==
1965: Simcoe Blades defeated Lindsay Muskies 4-games-to-1
1974: Cobourg Cougars defeated Simcoe Jets 4-games-to-1

== Notable alumni ==
- Rick Wamsley
- Dwayne Roloson
- Jassen Cullimore
- Kirk Maltby
- Tim Brent
