= Niagara & District Junior C Hockey League =

Niagara & District Junior "C" Hockey League
Head Office	Cambridge, Ontario
Official Website	NDJCHL
Operated	1974-2016

The Niagara & District Junior C Hockey League is a former Junior "C" ice hockey league in Ontario, Canada, sanctioned by the Ontario Hockey Association. The Champion of the Niagara competed for the All-Ontario Championship and the Clarence Schmalz Cup.

In the summer of 2016, the NDJCHL merged into the Provincial Junior Hockey League.

== History ==
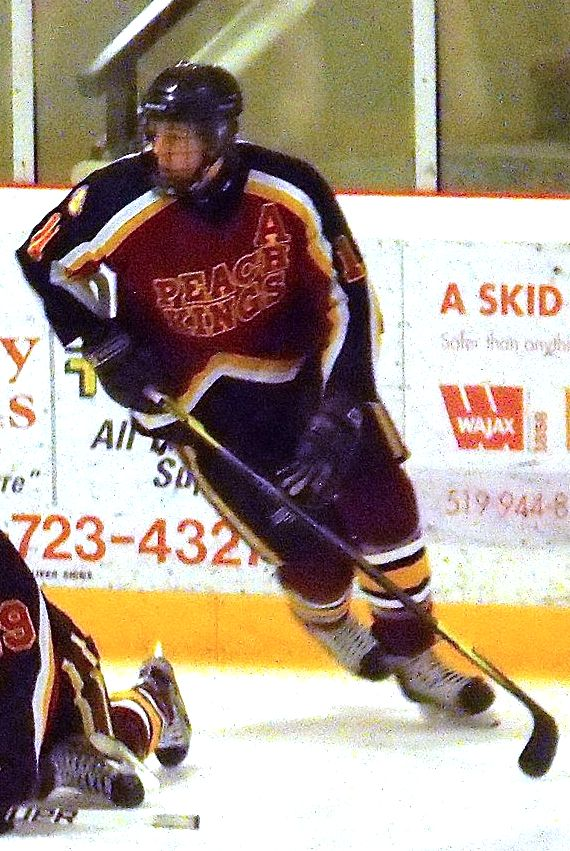
Grimsby player warming up during 2012 Schmalz Cup in Essex, Ontario.

The Niagara & District Junior C Hockey League was formed in 1974. Although corresponding with the founding of the Golden Horseshoe Junior Hockey League, the Niagara District league was actually founded by removing the Niagara-area teams from the Central Junior C Hockey League and placing them in the new Niagara District league. The Central league is now known as the Western Ontario Junior C Hockey League.

In 1984, the entire Western Division of the league broke away and formed the Southwestern Junior C Hockey League. The league only lasted one year before it was reabsorbed by the Niagara & District League. The Southwestern league comprised teams from Norwich, Woodstock, Tillsonburg, Simcoe, and New Hamburg. Local publications, like the Simcoe Reformer, did not recognize the Southwestern League as anything but the Western Division of the Niagara District league.

In the Spring of 2013, Junior C hockey in Ontario had its first major realignment since the creation of the Georgian Mid-Ontario Junior C Hockey League in 1994. The 27 teams between the Niagara & District League and the Southern Ontario Junior Hockey League were reshuffled. The Niagara & District League jumped from 12 to 18 teams, losing the Aylmer Spitfires, but gaining the Ayr Centennials, Burford Bulldogs, Delhi Travellers, Hagersville Hawks, Norfolk Rebels (Port Dover), Tavistock Braves, and Wellesley Applejacks. Not long after, the OHA split off the Western Division of the Niagara League to form the new Midwestern Junior C Hockey League, taking long time Niagara League members the Woodstock Navy-Vets, New Hamburg Firebirds, Norwich Merchants, and Paris Mounties with them.

== Teams ==
Team	Centre	Founded
Dundas Blues	Dundas	1963
Dunnville Jr. Mudcats	Dunnville	1974
Glanbrook Rangers	Glanbrook	1975
Grimsby Peach Kings	Grimsby	1922
Hagersville Hawks	Hagersville	1992
Niagara Riverhawks	Niagara Falls	1987
Port Dover Sailors	Port Dover	1988
Simcoe Storm	Simcoe	1959

On hiatus:

- St. George Dukes

== 2015-16 Playoffs ==
Winner moves on to the Clarence Schmalz Cup.

Quarter-final
1	Glanbrook	4
8	Simcoe	0
4	Hagersville	4
5	Niagara	1
2	Grimsby	4
7	Port Dover	2
6	Dunnville	0
3	Dundas	4

Semi-final
1	Glanbrook	4
4	Hagersville	1
2	Grimsby	4
3	Dundas	3

Final
1	Glanbrook	3
2	Grimsby	4

== Niagara Junior "C" champions ==
Niagara District Junior C Champions are bolded. In a year that there is no bolded champion, there seems to have not been an overall Niagara District Champion and both division entered teams against different opponents at the provincial level. In 1985, the Western Division was known as the "Southwestern Junior C Hockey League".

**Year**	**Champions**	**Finalists**	**Result in Provincials**
1975	**Dunnville Terriers**		Lost semi-final vs. Lindsay (C)
1976	**Dunnville Terriers**		**Won Championship** vs. Essex (GL)
1977	**Stoney Creek Warriors**
1978	**Flamborough Sabres**	Glanbrook Rangers	Lost semi-final vs. Essex (GL)

**Year**	**East Champion**	**West Champion**	**Result in Provincials**
1979	**Stoney Creek Warriors**
1980		**Flamborough Colts**	Lost semi-final vs. Leamington (GL)
1981	Dunnville Terriers	**Woodstock Navy-Vets**	Lost semi-final vs. Essex (GL)

**Year**	**Can-Am Champion**	**Central Champion**	**West Champion**	**Result in Provincials**
1982	Team Port Colborne	**Flamborough Colts**	Norwich Merchants	**Won Championship** vs. Bowmanville (C)

**Year**	**East Champion**	**West Champion**	**Result in Provincials**
1983	**Dunnville Terriers**	Woodstock Navy-Vets	**Won Championship** vs. Lindsay (C)
1984	Stoney Creek Warriors	**Woodstock Navy-Vets**	Lost final vs. Penetang (GB)
1985	**Stoney Creek Warriors**	Woodstock Navy-Vets	Lost semi-final vs. Belle River (GL)
1986	Stoney Creek Warriors	**Norwich Merchants**	**Won Championship** vs. Bradford (MO)

**Year**	**East Champion**	**Central Champion**	**West Champion**	**Result in Provincials**
1987	Dundas Blues		**Norwich Merchants**	Lost final vs. Lakefield (C)

**Year**	**East Champion**	**West Champion**	**Result in Provincials**
1988	**Stoney Creek Warriors**	Woodstock Navy-Vets	Lost semi-final vs. Mooretown (GL)
1989	Caledonia Corvairs	Dundas Blues	Caledonia Lost quarter-final vs. Bradford (MO); Dundas Lost quarter-final vs. Belle River (GL)
1990	Port Dover Clippers	New Hamburg Spirit 83's	Port Dover Lost quarter-final vs. Orangeville (MO); New Hamburg Lost quarter-final vs. Belle River (GL)
1991	Port Dover Clippers	New Hamburg Spirit 83's	Port Dover Lost quarter-final vs. Orangeville (MO); New Hamburg Lost quarter-final vs. Belle River (GL)
1992	Chippawa Merchants	**Dundas Blues**	Lost semi-final vs. Belle River (GL)
1993	**Dundas Blues**	Woodstock Navy-Vets	Lost semi-final vs. Napanee Raiders (E)
1994	Rockton Real McCoys	Woodstock Navy-Vets	Rockton Lost final vs. Belle River (GL); Woodstock Lost quarter-final vs. Belle River (GL)
1995	Chippawa Merchants	**Woodstock Navy-Vets**	Lost semi-final vs. Belle River (GL)
1996	Glanbrook Rangers	**Paris Mounties**	**Won Championship** vs. Napanee (E)
1997	**Glanbrook Rangers**	Paris Mounties	**Won Championship** vs. Belle River (GL)
1998	**Glanbrook Rangers**	Norwich Merchants	**Won Championship** vs. Kincardine (W)
1999	**Glanbrook Rangers**	Woodstock Navy-Vets	**Won Championship** vs. Wallaceburg (GL)
2000	**Chippawa Riverhawks**	Norwich Merchants	Lost semi-final vs. Lakefield (C)
2001	**Chippawa Riverhawks**	Norwich Merchants	**Won Championship** vs. Belle River (GL)
2002	Chippawa Riverhawks	**Woodstock Navy-Vets**	Lost semi-final vs. Essex (GL)
2003	**Grimsby Peach Kings**	Norwich Merchants	**Won Championship** vs. Georgina (C)
2004	**Grimsby Peach Kings**	Simcoe Storm	**Won Championship** vs. Wingham (W)
2005	**Grimsby Peach Kings**	Simcoe Storm	Lost final vs. Essex (GL)
2006	Grimsby Peach Kings	**Simcoe Storm**	Lost semi-final vs. Essex (GL)
2007	**Grimsby Peach Kings**	Norwich Merchants	Lost semi-final vs. Essex (GL)
2008	**Grimsby Peach Kings**	Norwich Merchants	Lost semi-final vs. Essex (GL)
2009	Grimsby Peach Kings	**Norwich Merchants**	Lost semi-final vs. Essex (GL)
2010	**Grimsby Peach Kings**	Norwich Merchants	Lost semi-final vs. Belle River (GL)
2011	**Grimsby Peach Kings**	Norwich Merchants	**Won Championship** vs. Alliston (GMO)
2012	**Grimsby Peach Kings**	New Hamburg Firebirds	**Won Championship** vs. Alliston (GMO)
2013	**Grimsby Peach Kings**	New Hamburg Firebirds	Lost semi-final vs. Essex (GL)

**Year**	**Champion**	**Finalist**	**Result in Provincials**
2014	**Grimsby Peach Kings**	Dunnville Jr. Mudcats	Lost semi-final vs. Lakefield (C)
2015	**Grimsby Peach Kings**	Dundas Blues	Lost quarter-final vs. Ayr (MW)
2016	**Grimsby Peach Kings**	Glanbrook Rangers	Lost quarter-final vs. Ayr (MW)

== Regular season champions ==
Season	Champion	Record	Points
1974-75	Dunnville Terriers	24-3-3-0	51
1975-76	Dunnville Terriers	29-3-4-0	62
1976-77	Hagersville Flyers	21-4-5-0	47
1977-78	Flamborough Sabres	23-9-4-0	50
1978-79	Hagersville Flyers	26-11-3-0	55
1979-80	Stoney Creek Warriors	30-4-1-0	61
1980-81	Stoney Creek Warriors	30-7-3-0	63
1981-82	Norwich Merchants	26-5-1-0	53
1982-83	Dunnville Terriers	24-6-2-0	50
1983-84	Port Colborne Sailors	30-7-3-0	63
1984-85	Stoney Creek Warriors	26-7-1-0	53
1985-86	Stoney Creek Warriors	28-6-2-0	58
1986-87	Dundas Blues	25-6-3-0	53
1987-88	Norwich Merchants	27-5-4-0	58
1988-89	Dundas Blues	27-6-3-0	57
1989-90	Norwich Merchants	25-7-4-0	54
1990-91	Dundas Blues	26-5-3-0	55
1991-92	Flamborough Gamblers	27-5-1-0	55
1992-93	Woodstock Navy-Vets	29-2-5-0	63
1993-94	Paris Mounties	25-5-6-0	56
1994-95	Chippawa Merchants	31-2-2-0	64
1995-96	Glanbrook Rangers	32-3-1-0	65
1996-97	Woodstock Navy-Vets	32-4-3-1	68
1997-98	Glanbrook Rangers	37-1-4-0	78
1998-99	Glanbrook Rangers	33-2-1-0	67
1999-00	Chippawa Riverhawks	32-4-0-0	64
2000-01	Chippawa Riverhawks	31-0-4-1	67
2001-02	Woodstock Navy-Vets & Chippawa Riverhawks	25-9-1-1	52 (tie)
2002-03	Grimsby Peach Kings	30-2-3-1	64
2003-04	Grimsby Peach Kings	28-5-2-1	59
2004-05	Grimsby Peach Kings	28-5-3-0	59
2005-06	Grimsby Peach Kings	33-3-0-0	66
2006-07	Grimsby Peach Kings	28-7-0-1	57
2007-08	Grimsby Peach Kings	32-2-2-0	66
2008-09	Grimsby Peach Kings	26-8-0-2	54
2009-10	Simcoe Storm	29-5-0-2	60
2010-11	Norwich Merchants	32-2-0-2	66
2011-12	Grimsby Peach Kings	32-4-0-0	64
2012-13	New Hamburg Firebirds	32-4-0-2	66
2013-14	Grimsby Peach Kings	26-8-0-1	53
2014-15	Grimsby Peach Kings	31-7-0-4	66
2015-16	Glanbrook Rangers	31-10-0-1	63

Please note: Through much of the 1980s and 1990s, the divisions of the league were semi-autonomous and would often have different numbers of games in their schedules. The winners, in that case, are chosen by winning percentage. The 2001-02 ended up with the two division leaders with exact records, therefore a tie.

== Former teams ==
- Ancaster Shamrocks
- Aylmer Spitfires
- Beamsville-Lincoln Blades
- Buffalo Trojans
- Caledonia Corvairs
- Flamborough Colts
- Hagersville Flyers
- Merritton Centennials
- Niagara-on-the-Lake Bicentennials
- Port Colborne Sailors
- Port Dover Clippers
- Rockton Real McCoys
- Stoney Creek Warriors
- Thorold Paper C's
