= St. George Dukes =

- City: St. George, Ontario
- League: Niagara & District Junior C Hockey League
- Division: Eastern
- Founded: 1994
- Folded: 2013
- Home arena: South Dumfries Community Centre
- Colours: Blue, Yellow, and White
- General manager: Brian Shouldice
- Head coach: Rick Wrobel

The St. George Dukes were a junior ice hockey team based in St. George, Ontario, Canada. They played in the Niagara & District Junior C Hockey League of the Ontario Hockey Association.

== History ==
The Dukes were founded in 1994 as members of the OHA Junior Development League.

In 2006, the OHAJDL was dissolved and the Dukes joined the Southern Ontario Junior Hockey League.

The Dukes have been working with the Cambridge Winter Hawks Jr. B club for many years. Due to this the Dukes have brought in former Winter Hawk players such as Chris Vasile, Shawn Little, and Andrew Swaniga.

In the summer of 2012, the Dukes, as members of the SOJHL, were promoted to Junior C official by the OHA. Instead of staying with their long time league, the Dukes switched from the SOJHL to the Niagara & District Junior C Hockey League to replace the departed Caledonia Corvairs.

On September 27, 2012, the Dukes played their first official regular season Junior C game, losing 10-3 on the road against the Chippawa Riverhawks. On September 28, 2012, the Dukes picked up their first ever Junior C victory, a 6-2 road win against the Woodstock Navy-Vets. On September 29, 2012, the Dukes hosted their first ever home Junior C game, dropping a 6-1 decision to the Grimsby Peach Kings, two-time defending Clarence Schmalz Cup provincial champions, three-time defending Niagara District champions, and ten-time defending Niagara East champions.

The Dukes have elected to sit out the 2013-14 season. They were also unable to put a team together for the 2014-15 season.

== Season-by-season standings ==
| Season | GP | W | L | T | OTL | GF | GA | P | Results | Playoffs |
|---|---|---|---|---|---|---|---|---|---|---|
| 1994-95 | 40 | 9 | 29 | 0 | 2 | 157 | 241 | 20 | 17th OHAJDL | |
| 1995-96 | 40 | 9 | 28 | 1 | 2 | 133 | 238 | 21 | 18th OHAJDL | |
| 1996-97 | 40 | 5 | 32 | 2 | 1 | 128 | 276 | 13 | 18th OHAJDL | |
| 1997-98 | 37 | 20 | 15 | 1 | 1 | 147 | 130 | 42 | 9th OHAJDL | |
| 1998-99 | 37 | 16 | 17 | 2 | 2 | 129 | 153 | 36 | 11th OHAJDL | |
| 1999-00 | 38 | 12 | 22 | 1 | 3 | 117 | 161 | 28 | 14th OHAJDL | |
| 2000-01 | 40 | 6 | 30 | 1 | 3 | -- | -- | 16 | 18th OHAJDL | |
| 2001-02 | 40 | 11 | 25 | 1 | 3 | 148 | 211 | 26 | 17th OHAJDL | |
| 2002-03 | 40 | 21 | 11 | 5 | 3 | 177 | 150 | 50 | 4th OHAJDL | |
| 2003-04 | 40 | 17 | 15 | 4 | 4 | 161 | 146 | 42 | 10th OHAJDL | |
| 2004-05 | 38 | 13 | 21 | 1 | 3 | 134 | 172 | 30 | 13th OHAJDL | |
| 2005-06 | 38 | 23 | 12 | 3 | 0 | 154 | 123 | 49 | 5th OHAJDL | |
| 2006-07 | 42 | 27 | 14 | 0 | 1 | 180 | 142 | 55 | 4th SOJHL | |
| 2007-08 | 42 | 27 | 11 | - | 4 | 203 | 130 | 58 | 3rd SOJHL | |
| 2008-09 | 40 | 26 | 13 | - | 1 | 187 | 157 | 53 | 5th SOJHL | |
| 2009-10 | 36 | 11 | 23 | - | 2 | 137 | 200 | 24 | 12th SOJHL | |
| 2010-11 | 35 | 18 | 14 | - | 3 | 154 | 143 | 39 | 9th SOJHL | |
| 2011-12 | 35 | 17 | 15 | - | 3 | 150 | 136 | 37 | 10th SOJHL | |
| 2012-13 | 38 | 5 | 32 | - | 1 | 86 | 193 | 11 | 6th NJC-E | |
