= Stoney Creek Warriors =

- City: Stoney Creek, Ontario, Canada
- League: Greater Ontario Junior Hockey League
- Division: Golden Horseshoe
- Operated: 1974-2013
- Home arena: Valley Park Arena; Stoney Creek Arena; Market Street Arena
- Colours: Black, Yellow, and White
- General manager: Ryan Kuwabara
- Head coach: Ric Nattress
- Affiliates: Dundas Blues (NDJCHL)

Franchise history
- 1974-1992: Stoney Creek Warriors
- 1993-2001: Stoney Creek Spirit
- 2001-2013: Stoney Creek Warriors
- 2013-2018: Ancaster Avalanche
- 2018 to present: Hamilton Kilty B's

The Stoney Creek Warriors were a Canadian junior ice hockey team based in Stoney Creek, Ontario, Canada. They play in the Golden Horseshoe division of the Greater Ontario Junior Hockey League as well as the Golden Horseshoe Junior B Hockey League and the Niagara & District Junior C Hockey League. As of 2013, the team was relocated to Ancaster, Ontario and renamed the Ancaster Avalanche.

== History ==
The Warriors were first formed in 1974 as a member of the Niagara & District Junior C Hockey League. The Warriors won four Niagara Junior C championships in their time with the league.

The team moved up to the Golden Horseshoe Junior B in 1989. In 1993, the team changed their name to the Spirit. In 2001, the team changed their name back to the traditional "Warriors" moniker.

After 20 years, they won the 2009 Golden Horseshoe Championship against the Niagara Falls Canucks.

In 2009, the Warriors made their only appearance in a Sutherland Cup final, losing to the Brantford Eagles of the Mid-Western Conference.

In the Summer of 2013, the team was sold to a group in Ancaster, Ontario and relocated. The franchise is become known as the Ancaster Avalanche.

In April 2018, the team announced they were moving to Hamilton, taking over the Kilty B's moniker, purchased from the ownership of the Markham Royals who were previously located in Hamilton as the Red Wings and Kilty B's.

== Season-by-season results ==
Season	GP	W	L	T	OTL	GF	GA	P	Results	Playoffs
1974-75	27	4	23	0	-	--	--	8	6th NJCHL	
1975-76	36	15	18	3	-	--	--	33	5th NJCHL	
1976-77	30	19	5	6	-	--	--	44	2nd NJCHL	Won League, lost CSC QF
1977-78	36	18	17	1	-	--	--	37	5th NJCHL	
1978-79	40	22	9	9	-	264	165	53	1st NJC-E	Won League, lost CSC QF
1979-80	35	30	4	1	-	266	135	61	1st NJC-E	
1980-81	40	30	7	3	-	297	136	63	1st NJC-E	Lost semi-final
1981-82	32	10	18	4	-	--	--	24	5th NJC-C	
1982-83	28	15	8	5	-	--	--	35	2nd NJC-E	Lost semi-final
1983-84	40	26	10	4	-	--	--	56	2nd NJC-E	Lost final
1984-85	34	26	7	1	-	245	120	53	1st NJC-E	Won League, lost CSC SF
1985-86	36	28	6	2	-	--	--	58	1st NJC-E	
1986-87	34	22	10	2	-	--	--	46	2nd NJC-E	
1987-88	37	22	11	4	-	215	161	48	1st NJC-E	Won League, lost CSC SF
1988-89	40	17	16	7	-	--	--	41	5th NJC-E	
1989-90	48	5	42	0	1	183	363	11	9th GHJHL	
1990-91	42	11	26	3	2	163	239	27	6th GHJHL	
1991-92	42	15	25	2	0	188	255	32	5th GHJHL	
1992-93	Did Not Participate									
1993-94	41	15	22	4	-	193	245	34	6th NJC-E	
1994-95	42	7	31	4	2	182	256	20	7th GHJHL	
1995-96	50	29	19	1	1	176	201	60	4th GHJHL	
1996-97	42	11	29	1	1	138	189	24	7th GHJHL	
1997-98	49	14	29	6	0	187	261	34	7th GHJHL	
1998-99	48	8	38	2	0	141	296	18	7th GHJHL	
1999-00	48	2	44	2	0	110	383	6	7th GHJHL	
2000-01	48	12	31	5	0	150	249	29	6th GHJHL	
2001-02	47	10	33	2	2	132	236	24	7th GHJHL	
2002-03	48	6	36	3	3	148	292	18	7th GHJHL	
2003-04	48	11	31	5	1	128	182	28	6th GHJHL	
2004-05	48	15	22	9	2	134	184	41	5th GHJHL	
2005-06	49	25	18	3	3	177	138	56	5th GHJHL	Lost quarter-final
2006-07	49	11	35	2	1	157	263	25	7th GHJHL	Lost quarter-final
2007-08	49	23	22	1	3	212	211	50	6th GOJHL-GH	
2008-09	52	35	15	-	2	246	173	72	2nd GOJHL-GH	Lost final
2009-10	51	36	11	-	4	248	166	76	2nd GOJHL-GH	Lost semi-final round robin
2010-11	51	26	20	-	5	209	192	57	6th GOJHL-GH	Lost Conf. QF
2011-12	51	15	33	-	3	152	238	33	6th GOJHL-GH	Lost Conf. QF
2012-13	51	18	26	-	7	145	179	43	6th GOJHL-GH	

== Sutherland Cup appearances ==
2009: Brantford Eagles defeated Stoney Creek Warriors 4-games-to-1
