= Steve Mason (ice hockey) =

Canadian ice hockey player (born 1988)

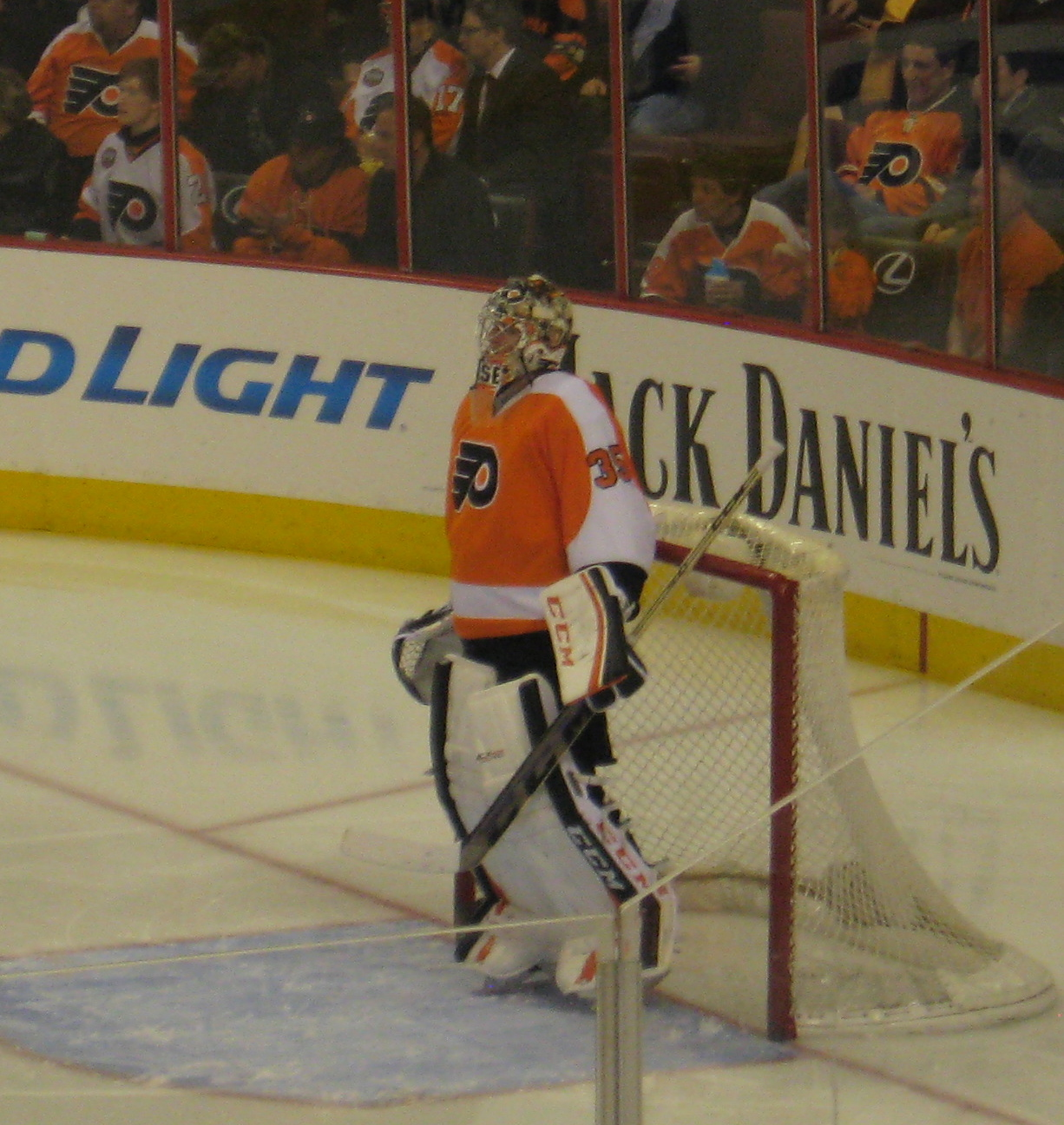
- Mason with the Philadelphia Flyers in 2014
- Born: May 29, 1988 (age 38) Oakville, Ontario, Canada
- Height: 6 ft 4 in (193 cm)
- Weight: 223 lb (101 kg; 15 st 13 lb)
- Position: Goaltender
- Caught: Right
- Played for: Columbus Blue Jackets; Philadelphia Flyers; Winnipeg Jets
- NHL draft: 69th overall, 2006; Columbus Blue Jackets
- Playing career: 2008–2018

Steve Mason (born May 29, 1988) is a Canadian former professional ice hockey goaltender. During his National Hockey League (NHL) career, he played for the Columbus Blue Jackets, Philadelphia Flyers and Winnipeg Jets.

He was selected in the third round, 69th overall, in the 2006 NHL entry draft by the Blue Jackets. Playing major junior in the Ontario Hockey League (OHL), Mason spent three seasons with the London Knights and Kitchener Rangers. In the 2006–07 season, he was named OHL Goaltender of the Year. He joined the Blue Jackets in 2008–09 and won the Calder Memorial Trophy as rookie of the year.

Internationally, he won a gold medal with Team Canada at the 2008 World Junior Championships while earning tournament MVP and Best Goaltender honours.

== Playing career ==
Mason grew up in Oakville, Ontario, playing mostly A hockey until his Bantam year, when he moved up to the AAA level with the Oakville Rangers of the OMHA's South Central AAA League. He was drafted after his minor midget season with Oakville by the London Knights of the OHL in the 11th round of the 2004 OHL Priority Selection.

In 2004–05, while attending Abbey Park High School, he led the Grimsby Peach Kings club to the OHA Jr.C. title in 2004–05 and in 2005–06 was assigned to the Petrolia Jets Jr.B. club when his playing time was limited with London. Despite this, Mason was selected by the Columbus Blue Jackets in the third round, 69th overall, in the 2006 NHL entry draft. He started the 2007–08 season with the Blue Jackets, but was returned to London after being a healthy scratch for Columbus' first two games of the season. While competing for Team Canada at the 2008 World Junior Championships, he was traded by the Knights to the Kitchener Rangers on January 4, 2008, hours before the semi-final game.

Upon returning from the World Junior Championships with a gold medal, Mason was briefly recalled by the Blue Jackets on an emergency basis in February, but did not appear in a game and was quickly returned. Mason suffered a knee injury towards the end of the regular season, but with the playoffs approaching, he tried to play through it for several weeks. After defeating the Plymouth Whalers in the first round, Mason was pulled out of the line-up and underwent arthroscopic knee surgery on April 18, forcing him to miss the remainder of the OHL playoffs, as well as the 2008 Memorial Cup. Kitchener won the OHL championship without Mason, but lost 4–1 in the Memorial Cup final against the Spokane Chiefs of the Western Hockey League (WHL).

=== Columbus Blue Jackets (2008–2013) ===
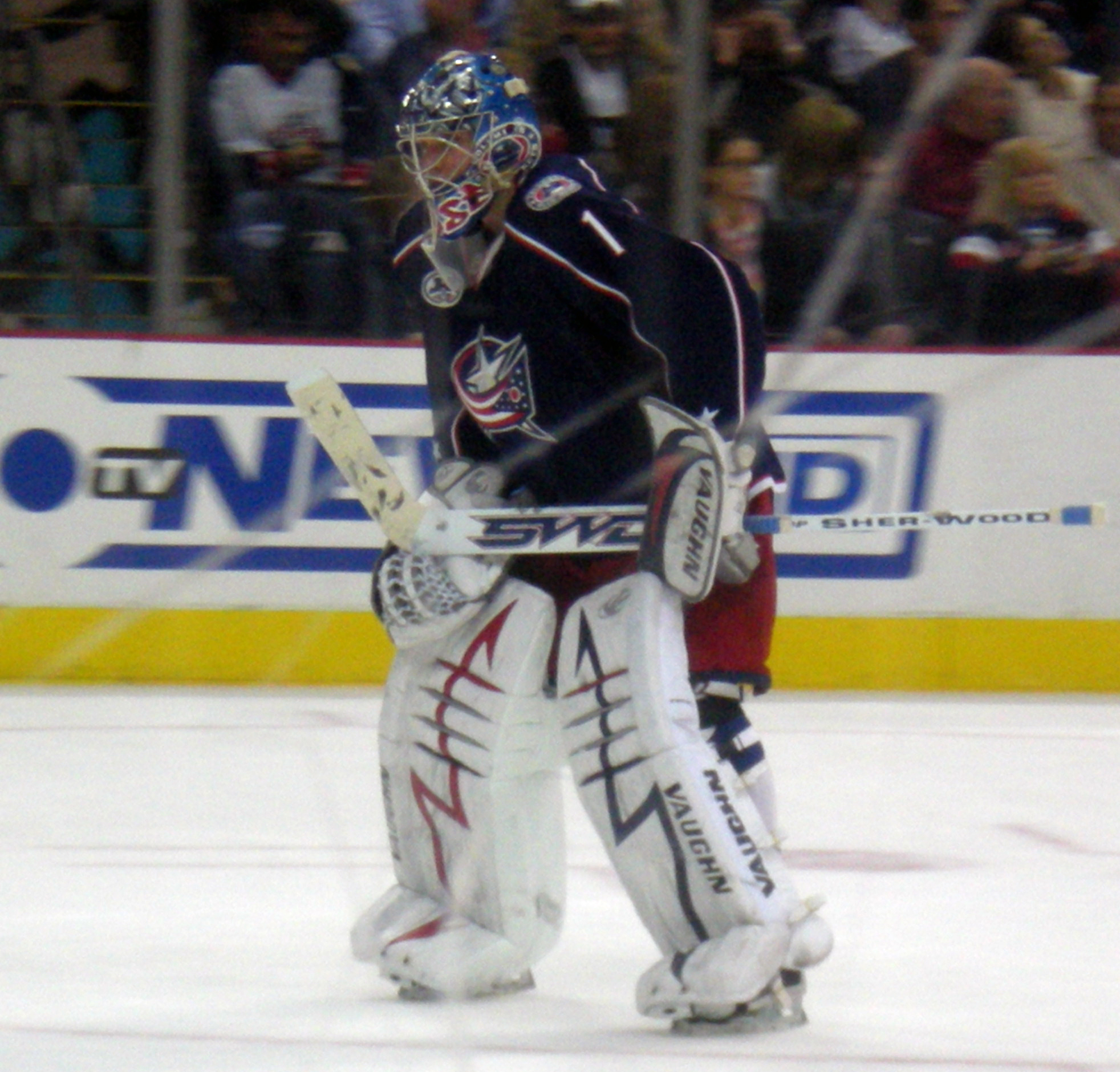
Mason in 2009 with the Blue Jackets

Before his first professional season, Mason underwent an additional knee surgery in September, causing him to miss the first month of play in the American Hockey League (AHL) with the Blue Jackets' minor league affiliate, the Syracuse Crunch. Shortly after recovering and joining the Crunch's line-up, Mason was called up by the Blue Jackets on November 4, 2008, in the absence of injured starter Pascal Leclaire. He made his NHL debut on November 5, starting against, and defeating, the Edmonton Oilers 5–4. He recorded his first NHL shutout several games later on November 22, making 15 saves in a 2–0 win against the Atlanta Thrashers.

Mason continued to start games upon Leclaire's return from injury and was named NHL Rookie of the Month for November after posting a 5–2–1 record, including three straight wins and two shutouts. In the midst of shutout streak, having not allowed a goal against the Philadelphia Flyers, Los Angeles Kings and Anaheim Ducks, he was named Rookie of the Month for a second-straight month in December. Along with Mason's three straight shutouts, he posted a 7–5–0 record, 1.41 goals against average (GAA) and .950 save percentage for the month. Chosen to play for the rookies at the 2009 NHL YoungStars Game, he opted, however, to skip the competition. It was later revealed on January 30, 2009, by Blue Jackets General Manager Scott Howson that Mason had been suffering from mononucleosis for the previous three-to-four weeks. After three more starts, on February 8, Mason was put on the injured reserve. He returned to the line-up on February 13 against the Detroit Red Wings in a 3–2 Columbus victory. Mason finished the season with a 33–20–7 record, 2.29 GAA and .916 save percentage. For his season's performances, he was awarded the 2009 Calder Memorial Trophy for rookie of the year honours, edging out Kris Versteeg of the Chicago Blackhawks and Bobby Ryan of the Anaheim Ducks in the process; as of 2023, he is the most recent goaltender to win the award. Additionally, on April 27, 2009, the NHL announced that Mason was nominated for the Vezina Trophy as the NHL's top goaltender, along with Tim Thomas of the Boston Bruins and Niklas Bäckström of the Minnesota Wild. Thomas was eventually awarded the trophy.

The next three seasons were a disappointment for Mason, however, as he was unable to duplicate the play of his rookie year, and the Blue Jackets failed to make another playoff appearance.

=== Philadelphia Flyers (2013–2017) ===
Mason was traded on April 3, 2013, to the Philadelphia Flyers for goaltender Michael Leighton and a 2015 third round draft pick. On April 8, Mason signed a one-year contract extension worth $1.5 million. Mason had four wins and two losses in Philadelphia and posted an impressive 1.90 GAA and a .944 save percentage, leading to speculation that Mason would replace Ilya Bryzgalov as the starter for Philadelphia. In the off-season, on June 25, 2013, Bryzgalov was bought out by the Flyers, where the team subsequently signed goaltender Ray Emery, effectively promoting Mason to the starter's role. On November 12, 2013, Mason recorded his first shutout for Philadelphia against the Ottawa Senators in a 5–0 win. On January 18, 2014, Mason signed a three-year contract extension with the Flyers worth $12.3 million for an annual average of $4.1 million. Mason finished the 2013-14 season with a 33-18-7 record and a .917 save percentage, which was enough to bring the Flyers to the playoffs. In the playoffs, Mason started 4 games and played in 5, going 2-2 with a 1.97 GAA and a .939 save percentage, but the Flyers were eliminated by the New York Rangers in 7 games.

=== Winnipeg Jets (2017–2018) ===
On July 1, 2017, Mason signed a two-year deal with the Winnipeg Jets for $4.1 million per year. The plan was for Mason to split the time with young Connor Hellebuyck, but Mason's season was derailed by injuries and inconsistent performance, causing him to ultimately lose the starting job to Hellebuyck..

On June 30, 2018, Mason was traded to the Montreal Canadiens along with forward Joel Armia and a few draft picks; the Canadiens put him on waivers in order to buy out his contract. Mason's contract was not picked up by another team, thus making him an unrestricted free agent.

After a lack of interest in the free agent market, Mason retired from playing and returned to his hometown of Oakville to serve as the director of goalie development for the Oakville Rangers, a youth team in Oakville.

== International play ==
Medal record

Representing Canada

Ice hockey

World Junior Championships
Gold medal – first place	2008 Czech Republic	

Mason first competed for Team Canada at the under-20 level in the eight-game 2007 Super Series against Russia. He then led Team Canada to a gold medal at the 2008 IIHF World Junior Hockey Championships in Pardubice, Czech Republic. Prior to the semi-final game against Team USA, Mason was traded within the OHL from the London Knights to the Kitchener Rangers. After defeating Team Sweden 3–2 in overtime of the gold medal game, he was named as the player of the game, as he was in the semi-finals. Mason was undefeated in five games with a tournament-best .951 save percentage and 1.19 GAA. He was named to the tournament all-star team, received top goaltender honours, and was named tournament MVP.

Following his rookie NHL season, Mason was named to Team Canada's summer orientation camp for the 2010 Winter Olympics in Vancouver. He was not named to the final roster, but he was reported to have been designated an injury replacement, along with St. Louis Blues goaltender Chris Mason.

== Career statistics ==
=== Regular season and playoffs ===
			Regular season									Playoffs
Season	Team	League	GP	W	L	T/OT	MIN	GA	SO	GAA	SV%	GP	W	L	MIN	GA	SO	GAA	SV%
2003–04	Oakville Rangers Min. Midget AAA	OMHA	27	22	4	1	1215	41	5	1.58	—	—	—	—	—	—	—	—	—
2004–05	Grimsby Peach Kings	NDJCHL	23	16	5	2	1239	61	2	2.96	—	—	—	—	—	—	—	—	—
2005–06	London Knights	OHL	12	5	3	0	497	22	0	2.66	.931	4	0	1	150	7	0	2.80	.911
2005–06	Petrolia Jets	WOHL	9	6	3	1	522	22	0	2.53	.931	—	—	—	—	—	—	—	—
2006–07	London Knights	OHL	62	45	13	4	3733	199	2	3.20	.914	16	9	7	931	54	0	3.48	.910
2007–08	London Knights	OHL	26	19	4	3	1569	73	2	2.79	.916	—	—	—	—	—	—	—	—
2007–08	Kitchener Rangers	OHL	16	13	3	0	961	33	1	2.06	.915	5	5	0	313	10	1	1.92	.946
2008–09	Syracuse Crunch	AHL	3	2	1	0	184	5	0	1.63	.937	—	—	—	—	—	—	—	—
2008–09	Columbus Blue Jackets	NHL	61	33	20	7	3664	140	10	2.29	.916	4	0	4	239	17	0	4.27	.878
2009–10	Columbus Blue Jackets	NHL	58	20	26	9	3201	163	5	3.05	.901	—	—	—	—	—	—	—	—
2010–11	Columbus Blue Jackets	NHL	54	24	21	7	3027	153	3	3.03	.901	—	—	—	—	—	—	—	—
2011–12	Columbus Blue Jackets	NHL	46	16	26	3	2534	143	1	3.39	.894	—	—	—	—	—	—	—	—
2012–13	Columbus Blue Jackets	NHL	13	3	6	1	712	35	0	2.95	.899	—	—	—	—	—	—	—	—
2012–13	Philadelphia Flyers	NHL	7	4	2	0	378	12	0	1.90	.944	—	—	—	—	—	—	—	—
2013–14	Philadelphia Flyers	NHL	61	33	18	7	3486	145	4	2.50	.917	5	2	2	244	8	0	1.97	.939
2014–15	Philadelphia Flyers	NHL	51	18	18	11	2885	108	3	2.25	.928	—	—	—	—	—	—	—	—
2015–16	Philadelphia Flyers	NHL	54	23	19	10	3150	132	4	2.51	.918	3	0	3	176	12	0	4.09	.852
2016–17	Philadelphia Flyers	NHL	58	26	21	8	3225	143	3	2.66	.908	—	—	—	—	—	—	—	—
2017–18	Winnipeg Jets	NHL	13	5	6	1	685	37	1	3.24	.906	1	0	0	20	0	0	0.00	1.000
2017–18	Manitoba Moose	AHL	1	1	0	0	64	4	0	3.73	.818	—	—	—	—	—	—	—	—
NHL totals			476	205	183	64	26,947	1,211	34	2.70	.911	13	2	9	680	37	0	3.27	.897

=== International ===
Year	Team	Event	Result	GP	W	L	T	MIN	GA	SO	GAA	SV%
2008	Canada	WJC	1st place, gold medalist(s)	5	5	0	0	303	6	1	1.19	.951
Junior totals				5	5	0	0	303	6	1	1.19	.951

== Awards ==
Junior

- Named OHL Goaltender of the Year in 2007.

NHL

- Named Rookie of the Month for November and December 2008.
- The Sporting News Rookie of the Year 2009.
- Named to the NHL second All-Star team in 2009.
- Calder Memorial Trophy winner in 2009.

International

- Named Player of the game in the semi-final (against Team USA) and gold medal game (against Sweden) at the 2008 World Junior Championships.
- Named to the World Junior all-star team in 2008.
- IIHF Best Player Award at the goaltender position at the World Juniors in 2008.
- Tournament MVP at the World Juniors in 2008.

Other

- Glove save on Craig Adams of the Pittsburgh Penguins voted by Flyers fans as the team's "Highlight of the Year" during the 2014–15 season.

== Records ==
- Set the OHL record for regular season wins with 45 in 2006–07 (broken by Andrew Engelage of the Windsor Spitfires with 46 wins in 2008–09)
- Set the CHL record for assists by a goaltender with 8 in 2007.

Awards and achievements
Preceded by Patrick Kane	Winner of the Calder Memorial Trophy; 2009	Succeeded by Tyler Myers
