= Corvair =

Corvair may refer to:

- Caledonia Corvairs, a Canadian junior ice hockey team based in Caledonia, Ontario
- Caledonia Corvairs (1961–2012), a Canadian junior hockey team based in Caledonia, Ontario
- Chevrolet Corvair, a compact car manufactured by Chevrolet for model years 1960–1969
- Chevrolet Corvair Monza GT, a mid-engined experimental prototype automobile built in 1962
