= Caledonia Corvairs (1961–2012) =

- City: Caledonia, Ontario
- League: Niagara & District Junior C Hockey League; Golden Horseshoe Junior Hockey League; Southwestern Junior B Hockey League; Central Junior C Hockey League; Southern Counties Junior D Hockey League
- Division: Eastern
- Operated: 1961-2012
- Home arena: Haldimand County Caledonia Centre
- Colors: Blue and White
- General manager: Scott Miller
- Head coach: Dan Brown

The Caledonia Corvairs were a Canadian junior hockey team based in Caledonia, Ontario, Canada. They were playing in the Niagara & District Junior C Hockey League.

On May 23, 2012, the Brantford Eagles relocated and became the Junior B Caledonia Corvairs. The Junior C team went on hiatus to make room for them.

== History ==
Founded in 1961, the Corvairs first played in the Southern Ontario Junior Hockey League. In 1969, they won the OHA Cup as provincial champions. In 1972, the team moved to the Western Junior C Hockey League. That year they won the Clarence Schmalz Cup as OHA Jr. C champions. In 1973, they were promoted to the Midwestern Junior B Hockey League. A year later they were moved to the Golden Horseshoe Junior B Hockey League.

=== 1973 Championship Season ===
Early in the 1972-73 season, the club's first year as a Junior C club, a second year player for the team named Tom Spratt was killed after a game in an automobile accident. The team had focus after losing their teammate and friend and won first-place finish in the Central Junior C Hockey League with a record of 23 wins, six losses, and three ties. They entered the playoffs against successful Simcoe Jets squad in the league quarter-finals. The Corvairs defeating them three-games-to-two. In the second round, the Corvairs drew the Listowel Cyclones. The Cyclones started the series strong, winning 3-2 in the first game and 9-2 in the second. The Corvairs won the next three games (5-2, 3-2, 6-1) to win the semi-final series. In the finals, the Corvairs met the New Hamburg Hahns. The Hans took game one 2-1, and the Corvairs won the next two games 4-2 and 3-2 in overtime. Game four was won by the Hahns 4-3, to force a game five. The Corvairs won the game (4-2), the series, and the Central league championship. In the provincial semi-final, the Corvairs drew the Leamington Flyers of the Great Lakes Junior C Hockey League. The Corvairs won game one 4-3 but lost games two and three (4-2, 3-2) to go down 2-games-to-1. They won game four 7-2, but then lost the game five 5-2. The Corvairs won games six and seven (5-4, 8-2) to gain entry into the provincial final. In the final they drew the Lindsay Mercurys who defeated the Gananoque Islanders to make the final. Caledonia won game one and two by scores of 4-3 and 10-3. They lost game three 2-1, but won games four and five (2-0, 5-2) to take the series and OHA championship. In the end they dedicated the victory to Tom Spratt.

The Corvairs were defeated in the 2005-06 playoffs by the Glanbrook Rangers 4-games-to-3 in the preliminary round.

== Season-by-season results ==
Season	GP	W	L	T	OTL	GF	GA	P	Results	Playoffs
1966-67	24	15	8	1	-	115	73	31	2nd SCJDHL	
1967-68	24	15	7	2	-	147	106	32	2nd SCJDHL	Won League
1968-69	30	23	7	0	-	176	114	46	1st SCJDHL	Won League, Won OHA Cup
1969-70	30	22	8	0	-	193	103	44	1st SCJDHL	
1970-71	30	22	7	1	-	172	106	45	1st SCJDHL	
1971-72	28	24	2	2	-	155	54	50	1st SCJDHL	
1972-73	32	24	5	3	-	--	--	51	1st CJCHL	Won League, Won CSC
1973-74	40	15	18	7	-	188	206	37	5th SWJBHL	
1974-75	40	25	7	8	-	246	152	58	1st GHJHL	
1975-76	40	18	20	2	-	197	201	38	4th GHJHL	
1976-77	32	17	11	4	-	168	159	38	2nd GHJHL	
1977-78	40	25	9	6	-	264	175	56	2nd GHJHL	
1978-79	42	15	25	2	-	254	203	32	5th GHJHL	
1979-80	44	11	29	4	-	232	282	26	9th GHJHL	
1980-81	32	13	15	4	-	--	--	30	6th NJC-E	
1981-82	32	17	14	1	-	--	--	35	3rd NJC-C	
1982-83	30	14	12	4	-	--	--	32	3rd NJC-E	
1983-84	40	26	11	3	-	--	--	55	3rd NJC-E	
1984-85	34	21	11	2	-	185	151	44	3rd NJCHL	
1985-86	36	14	19	3	-	--	--	31	2nd NJC-E	
1986-87	34	15	17	2	-	--	--	32	2nd NJC-C	
1987-88	37	14	18	5	-	150	168	33	5th NJC-E	
1988-89	40	22	14	4	-	--	--	48	2nd NJC-E	Won East League
1989-90	40	26	10	4	-	--	--	56	2nd NJC-E	
1990-91	36	19	12	5	-	183	151	43	2nd NJC-E	
1991-92	36	15	15	6	-	135	126	36	5th NJC-E	
1992-93	36	10	20	6	-	150	180	26	6th NJC-W	
1993-94	36	13	18	5	-	176	185	31	5th NJC-W	
1994-95	36	5	29	2	-	102	236	12	6th NJC-W	
1995-96	36	3	29	4	-	95	218	10	7th NJC-E	
1996-97	36	3	27	4	2	115	208	12	7th NJC-E	
1997-98	42	14	26	2	0	153	178	30	5th NJC-E	
1998-99	35	10	25	0	0	111	151	20	6th NJC-E	
1999-00	35	16	15	-	4	115	132	36	4th NJC-E	
2000-01	36	6	23	4	3	121	174	19	5th NJC-E	
2001-02	36	15	19	1	1	129	148	32	5th NJC-E	
2002-03	36	13	20	2	1	132	185	29	9th NJCHL	
2003-04	36	10	22	3	1	137	219	24	9th NJCHL	
2004-05	36	6	27	2	1	81	210	15	12th NJCHL	
2005-06	36	11	22	2	1	115	159	25	10th NJCHL	Lost Preliminary
2006-07	36	24	9	1	2	163	123	51	4th NJCHL	
2007-08	35	16	16	2	1	121	120	35	8th NJCHL	Lost Quarter Final
2008-09	36	13	22	-	1	112	137	27	10th NJCHL	Lost Quarter Final
2009-10	36	15	13	-	8	125	140	38	7th NJCHL	Lost Quarter Final
2010-11	36	10	25	-	1	117	163	21	10th NJCHL	Lost Semi Final
2011-12	36	16	18	-	2	101	125	34	7th NJCHL	Lost Semi Final

== Clarence Schmalz Cup Appearances ==
1973: Caledonia Corvairs defeated Lindsay Muskies 4-games-to-1
