= Hagersville Hawks =

Canadian junior ice hockey team

- City: Hagersville, Ontario
- League: Provincial Junior Hockey League
- Conference: South
- Division: Bloomfield
- Founded: 1992
- Home arena: Hagersville Memorial Arena
- Colours: Red, black, white
- General manager: Todd DeMille
- Head coach: Avery Hartwick

Championships
- League champions: 2005
- OHA Cups: 2005

The Hagersville Hawks are a junior ice hockey team from Hagersville, Ontario, Canada. They are members of the Provincial Junior Hockey League in the Ontario Hockey Association.

== History ==
The Hagersville Hawks were founded in 1992. The town was previously represented by the Hagersville Flyers of the Niagara & District Junior C Hockey League. The Hawks won the OHA Cup as league and provincial Junior "D" champions in 2005.

In 2013, the Hawks were moved to the Niagara & District Junior C Hockey League from the Southern Ontario Junior Hockey League as the OHA eliminated Jr. "D" hockey.

Following the 2015–16 season, all the junior "C" hockey leagues united under the Provincial Junior Hockey League. The Hawks' former league stayed together as the Bloomfield Division of the South Conference in the new league.

The playoffs for the 2019-20 season were cancelled due to the COVID-19 pandemic, leading to the team not being able to play a single game.

== Season-by-season record ==
| Season | GP | W | L | T | OTL | GF | GA | P | Results | Playoffs |
| 1992-93 | 40 | 17 | 20 | 3 | 0 | 183 | 212 | 37 | 9th OHAJDL | |
| 1993-94 | 40 | 13 | 25 | 2 | - | 156 | 230 | 28 | 14th OHAJDL | |
| 1994-95 | 39 | 19 | 12 | 3 | 5 | 170 | 167 | 46 | 7th OHAJDL | |
| 1995-96 | 40 | 13 | 21 | 4 | 2 | 167 | 217 | 32 | 15th OHAJDL | |
| 1996-97 | 40 | 22 | 11 | 6 | 1 | 185 | 165 | 51 | 4th OHAJDL | |
| 1997-98 | 38 | 23 | 13 | 2 | 0 | 196 | 157 | 48 | 5th OHAJDL | |
| 1998-99 | 38 | 24 | 11 | 2 | 1 | 183 | 121 | 51 | 5th OHAJDL | |
| 1999-00 | 38 | 27 | 7 | 2 | 2 | 171 | 113 | 58 | 3rd OHAJDL | Won div. semi-final 4-0 (Sailors); Lost div. final 1-4 (Bulldogs) |
| 2000-01 | 40 | 28 | 8 | 4 | 0 | -- | -- | 60 | 3rd OHAJDL | Won div. semi-final 4-0 (Thunderbirds); Lost div. final 2-4 (Bulldogs) |
| 2001-02 | 40 | 20 | 16 | 3 | 1 | 138 | 142 | 44 | 8th OHAJDL | Won div. semi-final 4-1 (Thunderbirds); Lost div. final 0-4 (Applejacks) |
| 2002-03 | 40 | 26 | 10 | 3 | 1 | 181 | 131 | 56 | 2nd OHAJDL | Won div. semi-final 4-1 (Thunderbirds); Won div. final 4-0 (Bulldogs); Lost conference final 1-4 (Applejacks) |
| 2003-04 | 40 | 28 | 4 | 3 | 5 | 202 | 129 | 64 | 1st OHAJDL | Won div. semi-final 4-1 (Sailors); Won div. final 4-0 (Bulldogs); Lost conference final 2-4 (Braves) |
| 2004-05 | 40 | 31 | 7 | 2 | 0 | 212 | 134 | 64 | 1st OHAJDL | Won div. semi-final 4-0 (Thunderbirds); Won div. final 4-1 (Sailors); Won conference final 4-2 (Braves); Won OHA Cup 4-1 (Bulldogs) |
| 2005-06 | 37 | 22 | 8 | 4 | 3 | 179 | 132 | 51 | 3rd OHAJDL | Won conference quarter-final 4-1 (Sailors); Lost conference semi-final 3-4 (Travellers) |
| 2006-07 | 42 | 20 | 20 | 0 | 2 | 191 | 193 | 42 | 11th SOJHL | Won conference quarter-final 4-2 (Bulldogs); Lost conference semi-final 2-4 (Braves) |
| 2007-08 | 42 | 15 | 24 | - | 3 | 132 | 172 | 33 | 13th SOJHL | Lost conference quarter-final 0-4 (Braves) |
| 2008-09 | 40 | 17 | 23 | - | 0 | 133 | 165 | 34 | 10th SOJHL | Won conference semi-final 4-2 (Dukes); Lost conference final 0-4 (Travellers) |
| 2009-10 | 36 | 19 | 17 | - | 0 | 140 | 145 | 38 | 9th SOJHL | Won conference semi-final 4-0 (Bulldogs); Lost conference final 1-4 (Travellers) |
| 2010-11 | 35 | 24 | 9 | - | 2 | 167 | 114 | 50 | 2nd SOJHL | Won conference semi-final 4-1 (Bulldogs); Lost conference final 1-4 (Centennials) |
| 2011-12 | 35 | 24 | 9 | - | 2 | 168 | 125 | 50 | 5th SOJHL | Won div. quarter-final 4-0 (Bulldogs); Won conference final 4-1 (Centennials); Won div. final 4-1 (Travellers); Lost final 0-4 (Trojans) |
Southern Ontario Junior Hockey League - Jr "C"
| 2012-13 | 38 | 26 | 10 | - | 2 | 187 | 140 | 54 | 2nd SOJHL-Mc | Conference quarter-final bye Won conference semi-final 4-3 (Applejacks); Lost conference final 3-4 (Centennials) |
| 2013-14 | 35 | 25 | 8 | - | 2 | 175 | 122 | 52 | 2nd NJCHL | Won quarter-final 4-1 (Simcoe Storm); Lost semi-final 3-4 (Jr. Mudcats) |
| 2014-15 | 42 | 21 | 18 | - | 3 | 162 | 149 | 45 | 5th NJCHL | Won quarter-final - 4-3 - (Rangers); Lost semi's - 1-4 - (Peach Kings) |
| 2015-16 | 42 | 26 | 16 | 1 | 0 | 181 | 132 | 53 | 4th of 8 NJCHL | Lost quarter-final - 0-4 (Riverhawks); Lost semi-final 3-4 (Rangers) |
| 2016-17 | 42 | 24 | 17 | 1 | - | 189 | 120 | 49 | 3rd of 8-PJHL; Bloomfield div. | Lost div. quarter-final, 3-4 (Jr. Mudcats) |
| 2017-18 | 42 | 15 | 24 | 2 | 1 | 143 | 175 | 33 | 5th of 8-PJHL; Bloomfield div. | Lost div. quarter-final, 2-4 (Blues) |
| 2018-19 | 42 | 21 | 15 | 3 | 3 | 139 | 99 | 48 | 3rd of 8-PJHL; Bloomfield div. | Won div. quarter-final, 4-0 (Sailors); Lost div. semi-final, 0-4 (Peach Kings) |
| 2019-20 | 42 | 29 | 9 | 3 | 2 | 162 | 103 | 63 | 2nd of 8-PJHL; Bloomfield div. | Won div. quarter-final, 4-0 (Sailors); Lost div. semi-final, 0-4 (Rangers) |
| 2020-21 | Season lost due to COVID-19 pandemic | | | | | | | | | |
| 2021-22 | 30 | 8 | 18 | 2 | 2 | 73 | 118 | 20 | 6th of 7-PJHL; Bloomfield div. | Lost div. quarter-final, 2-4 (Rangers) |
| 2022-23 | 42 | 6 | 31 | 4 | 1 | 95 | 189 | 17 | 7th of 7-PJHL; Bloomfield div. | Lost div. quarter-final, 0-4 (Peach Kings) |
| 2023-24 | 42 | 17 | 19 | 4 | 2 | 139 | 159 | 40 | 5th of 7-PJHL; Bloomfield div. | Lost div. quarter-final, 2-4 (Riverhawks) |
| 2024-25 | 42 | 24 | 16 | 0 | 2 | 177 | 147 | 50 | 4th of 8 Bloomfield Div; 7th of 16 South Conf; 26th of 63 PJHL | Won div. quarter-final, 4-2 (Rangers); Lost div. semi-final, 0-4 (Blues) |
| 2025-26 | 42 | 4 | 34 | 4 | 0 | 114 | 247 | 12 | 8th of 8 Bloomfield Div; 16th of 16 South Conf; 58th of 61 PJHL | Lost div. quarter-final, 0-4 (Blues) |
