= Dunnville Jr. Mudcats =

Canadian junior ice hockey team

- City: Dunnville, Ontario
- League: Provincial Junior Hockey League
- Conference: South
- Division: Bloomfield
- Founded: 1974
- Home arena: Dunnville Memorial Arena
- Colours: Blue, yellow, and white
- General manager: Curtis Longland (2021–present)
- Head coach: Ryan Ricker (2023–present)

Franchise history
- 1974–2010: Dunnville Terriers; 2010–present: Dunnville Jr. Mudcats

Championships
- League champions: 1975, 1976, and 1983
- Clarence Schmalz Cups: 1976 and 1983

The Dunnville Jr. Mudcats are a junior ice hockey team based in Dunnville, Ontario, Canada. They are playing in the Provincial Junior Hockey League.

Prior to the 2016–17 season the Mudcats competed in the Niagara & District Junior C Hockey League.

== History ==
Before joining the Niagara "C", the Terriers played in the Golden Horseshoe Junior B Hockey League.

The Terriers' logo originally had a silhouette of a Scottish Terrier on it up until the early 1980s. Since then, despite the name of the team, the logo has shown an image of an English Bulldog.

In the summer of 2010, the "Terriers" changed their name to the Dunnville Jr. Mudcats. The Mudcats are the namesake of the former Senior B team from town called the Dunnville Mudcats.

== Season-by-season results ==
Season	GP	W	L	T	OTL	GF	GA	P	Results	Playoffs
1974-75	30	24	3	3	-	--	--	51	1st NJCHL	Won League, lost CSC SF
1975-76	36	29	3	4	-	--	--	62	1st NJCHL	Won League, won CSC
1976-77	32	17	12	3	-	172	164	37	3rd GHJHL	
1977-78	40	14	22	4	-	194	252	32	5th GHJHL	
1978-79	40								6th NDJBHL	
1979-80	39	20	14	5	-	171	141	45	2nd NJC-E	Lost quarter-final
1980-81	40	19	17	4	-	223	191	42	4th NJC-E	Lost final
1981-82	35	23	7	5	-	--	--	51	2nd NJC-CA	Lost div. final
1982-83	32	24	6	2	-	--	--	50	1st NJC-E	Won League, won CSC
1983-84	40	14	20	6	-	--	--	34	4th NJC-E	
1984-85	34	20	11	3	-	188	122	43	4th NJCHL	Lost semi-final
1985-86	39	18	19	2	-	205	190	38	7th GHJHL	
1986-87	34	16	13	5	-	--	--	37	1st NJC-C	
1987-88	40	19	16	5	-	186	196	43	2nd NJC-E	Lost quarter-final
1988-89	40	4	31	5	-	--	--	13	6th NJC-E	
1989-90	40	17	20	3	-	--	--	37	4th NJC-E	
1990-91	36	8	24	4	-	134	198	20	7th NJC-E	
1991-92	36	3	31	2	-	112	245	8	7th NJC-E	
1992-93	42	9	27	6	-	144	265	24	7th NJC-E	
1993-94	41	4	35	2	-	134	291	10	8th NJC-E	
1994-95	36	7	26	3	-	118	236	17	6th NJC-E	
1995-96	36	9	23	4	-	104	189	22	6th NJC-E	
1996-97	36	9	24	2	1	118	222	21	6th NJC-E	
1997-98	42	6	35	1	0	104	314	13	7th NJC-E	
1998-99	35	5	29	0	1	98	223	11	7th NJC-E	
1999-00	36	6	29	-	1	124	216	13	6th NJC-E	Lost div. semi-final 0-4 (Riverhawks)
2000-01	36	4	30	1	1	101	226	10	6th NJC-E	Lost div. semi-final 0-4 (Riverhawks)
2001-02	36	7	25	1	3	104	188	18	6th NJC-E	Lost div. semi-final 0-4 (Riverhawks)
2002-03	36	14	19	1	2	161	164	31	8th NJCHL	Won div. quarter-final 4-2 (Rangers); Lost div. semi-final 0-4 (Peach Kings)
2003-04	36	10	23	2	0	120	176	22	11th NJCHL	Lost div. quarter-final 2-4 (Riverhawks)
2004-05	36	9	26	1	0	117	203	19	11th NJCHL	Lost div. quarter-final 0-4 (Rangers)
2005-06	36	12	18	3	3	126	152	30	7th NJCHL	DNQ
2006-07	36	4	27	1	4	136	266	13	11th NJCHL	DNQ
2007-08	36	0	35	0	1	74	316	1	12th NJCHL	Lost preliminary round 0-4 (Blues)
2008-09	36	2	33	-	1	69	256	5	12th NJCHL	Lost preliminary round 0-4 (Rangers)
2009-10	36	6	29	-	1	118	200	13	12th NJCHL	Lost div. quarter-final 1-4 (Blues)
2010-11	36	19	15	-	2	156	169	40	8th NJCHL	Lost div. quarter-final 2-4 (Corvairs)
2011-12	36	7	27	-	2	117	185	16	12th NJCHL	Lost div. quarter-final 3-4 (Corvairs)
2012-13	38	21	15	-	2	131	133	44	3rd NJC-E	Won div. quarter-final 4-0 (Dukes); Lost 2-4 (Peach Kings)
2013-14	35	22	12	-	1	148	104	45	3rd NJCHL	Won quarter-final 4-1 (Rangers); Won semi-final 4-3 (Hawks); Lost final 0-4 (Peach Kings)
2014-15	42	27	12	-	3	184	129	57	3rd NJCHL	Won quarter-final 4-0 (Riverhawks); Lost semi-final 0-4 - (Blues)
2015-16	42	16	24	1	1	161	172	34	6th of 8 NJCHL	Lost quarter-final 0-4 (Blues)
2016-17	42	16	25	1	-	139	170	33	6th of 8-PJHL; Bloomfield Div	Won div. quarter-final 4-3 (Hawks); Lost div. semi-final 0-4 (Peach Kings)
2017-18	42	13	25	3	1	115	186	30	7th of 8-PJHL; Bloomfield Div	Lost div. quarter-final 0-4 (Peach Kings)
2018-19	42	9	29	1	3	99	231	22	7th of 8-PJHL; Bloomfield Div	Lost div. quarter-final 1-4 (Peach Kings)
2019-20	42	11	28	1	2	100	177	25	8th of 8-PJHL; Bloomfield Div	Lost div. quarter-final 0-4 (Peach Kings)
2020-21	Season lost due to COVID-19 pandemic									
2021-22	30	8	19	3	0	69	113	19	7th of 7-PJHL; Bloomfield Div	Lost div. quarter-final 0-4 (Peach Kings)
2022-23	42	13	25	2	2	111	170	30	6th of 7-PJHL; Bloomfield Div	Lost div. quarter-final 0-4 (Sailors)
2023-24	42	10	27	3	2	103	186	25	6th of 7-PJHL; Bloomfield Div	Lost div. quarter-final 0-4 (Rangers)
2024-25	42	10	28	4	0	132	218	24	7th of 8 Bloomfield; 14th of 16 South Conf; 53rd of 63 PJHL	Lost div. quarter-final 0-4 (Peach Kings)
2025-26	42	17	23	1	1	116	224	36	6th of 8 Bloomfield; 11th of 16 South Conf; 40th of 61 PJHL	Lost div. quarter-final 0-4 (Riverhawks)

== Clarence Schmalz Cup appearances ==
1976: Dunnville Terriers defeated Essex 73's 4-2.
1983: Dunnville Terriers defeated Lindsay Muskies 4-2.

== Notable alumni ==
- Pete DeBoer (1983–85, as the Dunnville Terriers)
- Ray Emery (1998–99, as the Dunnville Terriers)
- Mark Osborne
