= Niagara Riverhawks =

Canadian junior ice hockey team

Niagara RiverHawks
- City: Niagara Falls, Ontario
- League: Provincial Junior Hockey League
- Conference: South
- Division: South Bloomfield
- Founded: 1987
- Home arena: Gale Centre
- Colours: Red Black White Gray Silver
- General manager: Fred Sacco
- Head coach: Frank Girhiny
- Asst. coaches: Rick Girhiny; Chris Sacco

Franchise history
- 1987–1999: Chippawa Merchants; 1999–2014: Chippawa RiverHawks; 2014–present: Niagara RiverHawks

Championships
- League champions: 2000 and 2001
- Clarence Schmalz Cups: 2001

The Niagara RiverHawks are a junior ice hockey team based in Niagara Falls, Ontario, Canada. They play in the Provincial Junior Hockey League .

== History ==
In 1987, the Chippawa Merchants were granted an OHA Junior C franchise and were based in the Chippawa Willoughby Arena.

In 1999, the Chippawa Merchants changed their team name to the RiverHawks.

In 2001, the RiverHawks defeated the Belle River Canadiens of the Great Lakes Junior C Hockey League 4-games-to-1 to win the Clarence Schmalz Cup as Ontario Hockey Association provincial Junior C champions.

In 2010, the RiverHawks left the Chippawa Willoughby Arena for the brand new Gale Centre, located in Niagara Falls. As a part of the move the team changed colours from their original red, white and black scheme to teal, gray and white with orange trim.

In 2014, the RiverHawks were granted a name change to the Niagara RiverHawks to reflect their use of the Gale Centre in Niagara Falls as their home arena, and their at-large status by not being affiliated with a specific Junior B hockey club.

For the 2016-17 season the Riverhawks became part of the Junior C hockey re-structure in Southern Ontario. All junior C leagues joined under one umbrella as the Provincial Junior Hockey League. The former Niagara & District Junior C Hockey League became the Bloomfield Division of the South Conference.

The playoffs for the 2019-20 season were cancelled due to the COVID-19 pandemic, leading to the team not being able to play a single game.

In the 2023-2024 season, The Riverhawks were acquired by a new ownership team, Although still playing at the Gale Centre, this would see the team return to the original colour scheme, being Red, Black, White, Grey with a Silver Trim

== Season-by-season record ==
Note: GP = Games Played, W = Wins, L = Losses, T = Ties, OTL = Overtime Losses, GF = Goals for, GA = Goals against

Season	GP	W	L	T	OTL	GF	GA	Points	Finish	Playoffs
1987-88	39	13	21	5	-	185	226	31	6th NJC-E	
1988-89	40	23	14	3	-	--	--	49	1st NJC-E	
1989-90	40	16	22	2	-	--	--	34	5th NJC-E	
1990-91	36	11	19	6	-	174	211	28	4th NJC-E	
1991-92	36	19	15	2	-	189	152	40	3rd NJC-E	Lost final
1992-93	42	27	9	6	-	265	140	60	2nd NJC-E	
1993-94	41	26	11	4	-	240	158	56	3rd NJC-E	
1994-95	35	31	2	2	-	223	87	64	1st NJC-E	
1995-96	36	17	10	9	-	148	136	43	3rd NJC-E	
1996-97	36	25	10	1	0	191	133	51	3rd NJC-E	
1997-98	42	25	14	2	1	214	145	53	3rd NJC-E	
1998-99	36	22	12	2	0	153	107	46	3rd NJC-E	
1999-00	36	32	4	-	0	220	98	64	1st NJC-E	Won Div. semi-final 4-0 (Terriers); Won Div. final 4-0 (Corvairs); Won League 4-3 (Merchants); Lost CSC semi-final 2-4 (Chiefs)
2000-01	36	31	0	4	1	202	79	67	1st NJC-E	Won Div. semi-final 4-0 (Terriers); Won Div final 4-3 (Peach Kings); Won League 4-0 (Merchants); Won CSC semi-final 4-0 (Bruins); Won CSC final 4-1 (Canadiens)
2001-02	36	25	9	1	1	173	110	52	1st NJC-E	Won Div. semi-final 4-0 (Terriers); Won Div final 4-2 (Peach Kings); Lost final 2-4 (Navy Vets)
2002-03	36	15	12	6	1	109	93	37	5th NJCHL	Won Div. quarter-final 4-2 (Corvairs); Lost Div. semi-final 1-4 (Jr. Blues)
2003-04	36	18	16	2	0	140	159	38	6th NJCHL	Won Div. quarter-final 4-2 (Terriers); Lost Div. semi-final 0-4 (Jr. Blues)
2004-05	36	18	15	2	1	136	127	39	6th NJCHL	Won Div. quarter-final 4-1 (Corvairs); Lost Div. semi-final 0-4 (Jr. Blues)
2005-06	36	11	19	3	3	135	177	28	8th NJCHL	Lost quarter-final 0-4 (Peach Kings)
2006-07	36	13	21	1	1	147	190	28	9th NJCHL	Lost quarter-final 0-4 (Peach Kings)
2007-08	36	14	18	2	2	161	166	32	10th NJCHL	Lost Preliminary Round 0-4 (Corvairs)
2008-09	36	19	14	-	3	171	150	41	8th NJCHL	Won Preliminary Round 4-0 (Corvairs); Lost quarter-final 0-4 (Peach Kings)
2009-10	36	20	13	-	3	155	151	43	4th NJCHL	Lost Div. semi-final 1-4 (Jr. Blues)
2010-11	36	9	26	-	1	110	196	19	11th NJCHL	Lost Div. quarter-final 0-4 (Jr. Blues)
2011-12	36	15	18	-	3	119	129	33	9th NJCHL	Won Div. quarter-final 4-3 (Jr. Blues); Lost Div. semi-final 0-4 (Peach Kings)
2012-13	38	19	15	-	4	139	125	42	4th NJC-E	Lost Div. quarter-final 2-4 (Jr. Blues)
2013-14	35	17	10	-	8	124	115	42	4th NJCHL	Lost quarter-final 2-4 (Jr. Blues)
2014-15	42	21	20	-	1	146	143	43	6th NJCHL	Lost quarter-final 0-4 (Jr. Mudcats)
2015-16	42	20	19	1	2	160	171	43	5th of 8 NJCHL	Lost quarter-final 1-4 (Hawks)
2016-17	42	13	28	1	-	140	188	27	7th of 8-PJHL; Bloomfield Div	Lost Div quarter-final 1-4 (Rangers)
2017-18	42	12	23	3	4	158	210	31	6th of 8-PJHL; Bloomfield Div	Lost Div quarter-final 3-4 (Sailors)
2018-19	42	20	17	0	5	143	181	45	5th of 8-PJHL; Bloomfield Div	Lost Div quarter-final 2-4 (Jr. Blues)
2019-20	43	15	24	0	3	134	167	33	6th of 8-PJHL; Bloomfield Div	Lost Div quarter-final 1-4 (Rangers)
2020-21	Season Lost due to COVID-19 pandemic									
2021-22	30	17	12	1	0	109	79	35	4th of 7-PJHL; Bloomfield Div	Won Div quarter-final 4-1 (Sailors); Lost Div. semi-final 1-4 (Peach Kings)
2022-23	42	21	16	5	0	161	167	47	4th of 7-PJHL; Bloomfield Div	Won Div quarter-final 4-2 (Jr. Blues); Lost Div semi-final 1-4 (Rangers)
2023-24	42	23	14	4	1	168	147	51	4th of 7-PJHL; Bloomfield Div	Won Div quarter-final 4-2 (Hawks); Lost Div. semi-final, 0-4 (Peach Kings)
2024-25	42	28	9	3	2	170	116	61	3rd of 8 Bloomfield Div; 5th of 16 South Conference; 15th of 63 - PJHL	Won Div quarter-final 4-1 (Derbys); Lost Div semi-final 2-4 (Peach Kings)
2025-26	42	27	14	0	1	191	151	55	3rd of 8 Bloomfield Div; 5th of 16 South Conference; 21st of 61 - PJHL	Won Div Quarter-Final 4-0 (Jr. Mudcats); Won Div Semi-Final 4-1 (Peach Kings); Lost Div Finals 1-4 (Jr. Blues)

== Clarence Schmalz Cup appearances ==
2001: Chippawa Riverhawks defeated Belle River Canadiens 4-games-to-1
