= Port Dover Sailors =

Canadian junior ice hockey team

- City: Port Dover, Ontario
- League: Provincial Junior Hockey League
- Conference: South
- Division: Bloomfield
- Founded: 1988
- Home arena: Port Dover Arena
- Colours: Blue, red, and white
- Owner: John Lennox
- General manager: Mike Walker(2020-present)
- Head coach: Mike Walker

Franchise history
- 1988–1999: Port Dover Clippers; 1999–2011: Port Dover Sailors; 2011–2013: Norfolk Rebels; 2013–present: Port Dover Sailors

Championships
- League champions: None

The Port Dover Sailors are a junior hockey team based in Port Dover, Ontario, Canada. They play in the Niagara & District Junior C Hockey League of the Ontario Hockey Association until the 2016-17 season when the league joined the Provincial Junior Hockey League and placed under the Bloomfield Division of the new league.

== History ==
The Port Dover Clippers were founded in 1988 as members of the Niagara & District Junior C Hockey League. The Clippers were 1990 and 1991 Niagara East champions and Niagara co-champions. In 1990, the Clippers would fall to the Orangeville Crushers of the Mid-Ontario Junior C Hockey League 4-games-to-1 in the Clarence Schmalz Cup OHA provincial quarter-final. Their western co-champions, the New Hamburg Spirit 83's would fare no better, dropping one of the other quarter-finals in four-straight games to the Great Lakes Junior C Hockey League champion Belle River Canadiens. The next year was more of the same, as Port Dover and New Hamburg were the co-champions, New Hamburg lost the provincial quarter-final to Belle River again (this time in six games), and Port Dover fell to Orangeville again in five.

In 1999, the Clippers took leave of the Niagara District league. Clippers changed their name to the Port Dover Sailors and applied for membership in the Ontario Hockey Association Junior Development League.

In 2006, the OHAJDL changed its name to the Southern Ontario Junior Hockey League; the Sailors competed in this league until 2013.

For the 2011―2012 season, the team was rebranded as the Norfolk Rebels and split time between Port Dover and Waterford, Ontario. The 2012―2013 season saw the Rebels have a winless season.

In 2013, the team was renamed the Port Dover Sailors. Along with the rename, the Sailors were moved to the Niagara & District Junior C Hockey League from the Southern Ontario Junior Hockey League as the OHA eliminated Jr. "D" hockey.

The playoffs for the 2019-20 season were cancelled due to the COVID-19 pandemic, leading to the team not being able to play a single game.

In 2022-23 The Sailors created a record breaking season led by Captain Benjamin Mason. Assistant Captain Nick D’Agostino set a new record for Points in a Season and won Most Sportsmanlike Player. Goaltender Finn Wilson won Rookie of the Year, also, head coach Mike Walker won Coach of the Year.

The team went into playoffs as the 3rd ranked team. Completing their first franchise sweep over the Dunnville Mudcats 4-0, and also won there first 2nd round series game (Jr.C) dating back to the 1990-91 season.

== Season-by-season record ==
Season	GP	W	L	T	OTL	GF	GA	P	Results	Playoffs
1988-89	40	19	13	8	-	--	--	46	3rd NJC-E	
1989-90	40	24	10	2	-	--	--	50	1st NJC-E	Won East, lost CSC QF
1990-91	36	22	10	4	-	237	152	48	1st NJC-E	Won East, lost CSC QF
1991-92	36	23	8	5	-	195	145	51	2nd NJC-E	
1992-93	36	12	16	8	-	157	181	32	3rd NJC-W	
1993-94	36	21	11	4	-	176	144	46	2nd NJC-W	
1994-95	36	19	14	3	-	195	171	41	4th NJC-W	
1995-96	40	13	23	4	-	163	237	30	4th NJC-W	
1996-97	40	1	37	0	2	78	287	4	6th NJC-W	
1997-98	38	2	35	0	1	106	239	5	6th NJC-W	
1998-99	35	4	30	-	1	--	--	9	6th NJC-W	
1999-00	38	10	25	1	2	140	242	23	15th OHAJDL	Lost Div semi-final 0-4 (Hawks)
2000-01	40	10	26	0	4	--	--	24	16th OHAJDL	DNQ
2001-02	40	8	27	4	1	100	212	21	18th OHAJDL	DNQ
2002-03	40	11	27	1	1	126	187	24	18th OHAJDL	DNQ
2003-04	40	16	22	1	1	127	148	34	14th OHAJDL	Lost Div semi-final 1-4 (Hawks)
2004-05	40	21	13	3	3	135	129	48	8th OHAJDL	Won Div semi-final 4-3 (Applejacks); Lost Div final 1-4 (Hawks)
2005-06	37	10	21	4	2	127	167	26	14th OHAJDL	Lost Conference Quarter-final 1-4 (Hawks)
2006-07	42	8	30	0	4	96	232	20	4th SOJHL-BM	Lost Conference Quarter-final 1-4 (Hawks)
2007-08	42	12	27	-	3	115	218	27	4th SOJHL-BM	Lost Conference Quarter-final 0-4 (Travellers)
2008-09	40	11	20	-	9	107	172	31	5th SOJHL-Mc	DNQ
2009-10	36	3	32	-	1	91	223	7	5th SOJHL-Mc	DNQ
2010-11	35	1	31	-	3	83	229	5	8th SOJHL-Mc	Lost Conference quarter-final 0-4 (Braves)
2011-12	35	2	30	-	3	103	284	7	8th SOJHL-Mc	DNQ
2012-13	38	0	36	-	2	78	319	2	7th SOJHL-Mc	Won Conference quarter-final 4-3 (Irish); Lost Conference semi-final 0-4 (Dolphins)
2013-14	35	5	28	-	2	89	184	12	8th NJCHL	Lost quarter-final 0-4 (Peach Kings)
2014-15	42	13	29	-	0	140	223	26	7th NJCHL	Lost quarter-final 1-4 (Blues)
2015-16	42	13	26	1	2	149	194	29	7th of 8 NJCHL	Lost quarter-final 2–4 (Peach Kings)
2016-17	42	22	20	0	-	161	165	40	4th of 8- PJHL; Bloomfield	Lost Div quarter-final 2-4 (Blues)
2017-18	42	23	17	1	1	152	167	48	3rd of 8- PJHL; Bloomfield	Won Div quarter-final 4-3 (Riverhawks); Lost div semi-final 0-4 (Peach Kings)
2018-19	42	13	24	2	3	110	166	31	7th of 8- PJHL; Bloomfield	Lost Div quarter-final 0-4 (Hawks)
2019-20	43	13	27	2	1	137	170	29	7th of 8- PJHL; Bloomfield	Lost Div quarter-final 0-4 (Hawks)
2020-21	Season Lost due to COVID-19 pandemic									
2021-22	30	15	11	4	0	121	125	34	5th of 7- PJHL; Bloomfield	Lost Div quarter-final 2-4 (Riverhawks)
2022-23	42	27	9	5	1	168	123	60	3rd of 7- PJHL; Bloomfield	Won Div quarter-final 4-0 (Mudcats); Lost Div semi-final 3-4 (Peach Kings)
2023-24	42	8	33	0	1	88	215	17	7th of 7- PJHL; Bloomfield	Lost Div quarter-final 0-4 (Blues)
2024-25	42	6	32	4	0	113	242	16	8th of 8 Bloomfield; 16th of 16 South Conf; 59th of 63 PJHL	Lost Div quarter-final 0-4 (Blues)
2025-26	42	13	23	5	1	146	202	32	7th of 8 Bloomfield; 13th of 16 South Conf; 46th of 61 PJHL	Lost Div quarter-final 3-4 (Peach Kings)
