= Southern Ontario Junior Hockey League =

Southern Ontario Junior Hockey League
Head Office	Cambridge, Ontario
Official Website	SOJHL
Convenor	Wayne Smith
Chairman	John Simmons
Operated	1960-2016

The Southern Ontario Junior Hockey League (SOJHL) is a former Canadian Junior ice hockey league sanctioned by the Ontario Hockey Association based out of Southwestern Ontario. Prior to the 2012-13 season, the SOJHL was promoted to the Junior C level.

In the summer of 2016, the SOJHL was merged into the Provincial Junior Hockey League.

== History ==
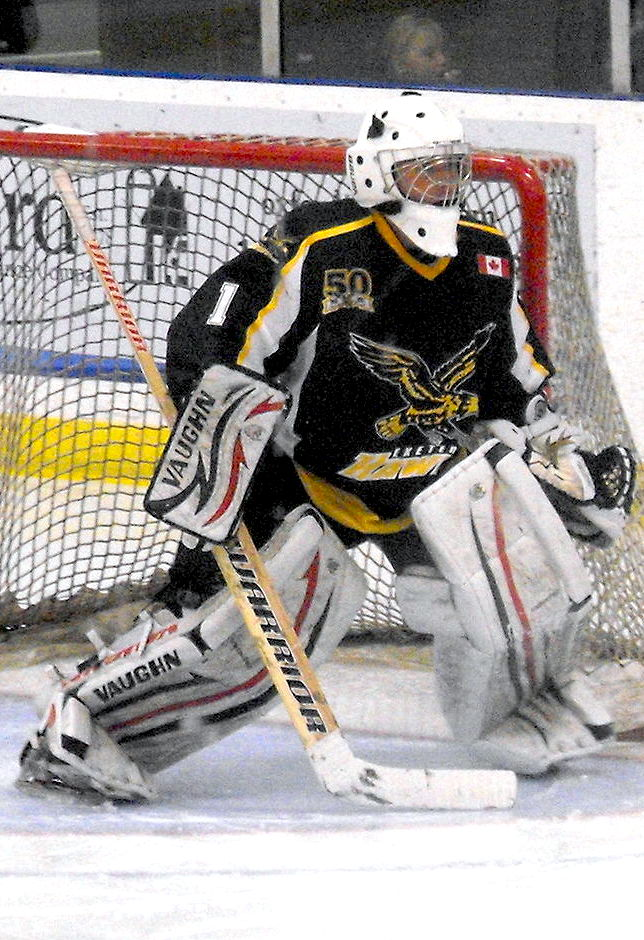
Exeter Hawks goalie readies for a shot in Dorchester, Ontario during the 2013-14 season.

What would become known as the SOJHL was founded in the 1960s as the Shamrock Junior D Hockey League. In 1969, the League would change its name to the Western Junior D Hockey League and its champion would go on to win eleven of the next nineteen provincial championships. In the Summer of 1985, the North Junior D Hockey League would fold, leaving the Western League and the Southern Counties Junior D Hockey League. In 1988, the SCJDHL would fold and its remaining teams joined the Western League. Bloated to nineteen teams, the league would continue on as the only Junior D league in Ontario. In 1991, the league became the OHA Junior Development League. In 2006, in an attempt to gain promotion to Junior C, the league dropped any reference of Junior D or Development and renamed itself the Southern Ontario Junior Hockey League.

Junior Development Hockey League

During the summer of 2006, the Yeck Conference applied to break off from the league and start their own Junior C league, but were turned down by the OHA. The SOJHL has a long-standing tradition of the OHA in the Southwestern Ontario region.

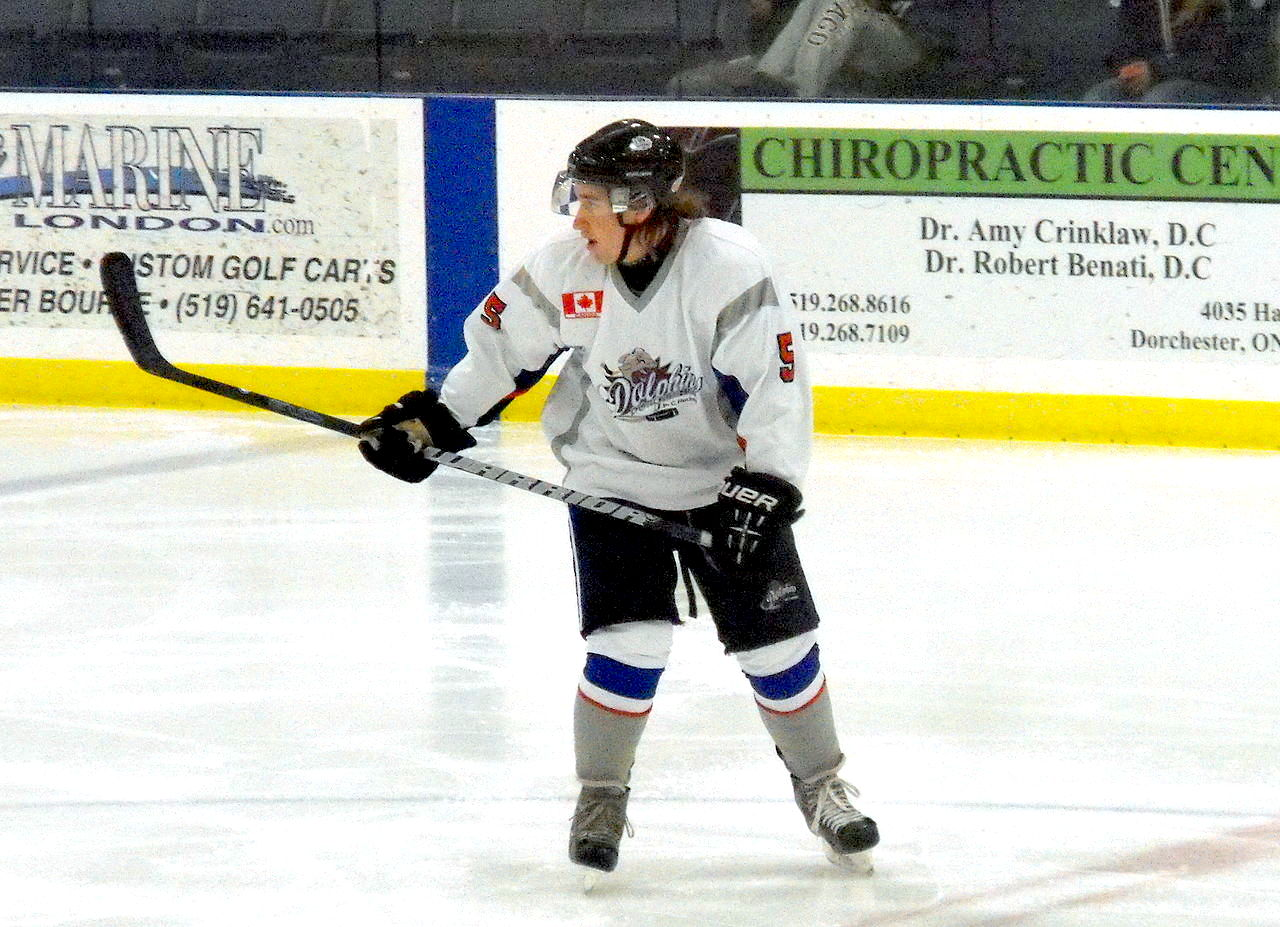
Dorchester Dolphins defenseman rushes back to defend against rush during 2013-14 season.

The SOJHL downsized extensively for the 2008-09 season, losing Mitchell, West Lorne, and Central Elgin. The league also reformatted into three divisions.

The SOJHL saw the Central Elgin franchise return, this time as the Port Stanley Sailors, for the 2009-2010 season.

As of 2012, the SOJHL is in talks with the OHA as to the future of the league. The 2012-13 season will be played at the Junior C level and the league will be folded and divided up into other leagues in the summer of 2013.

In the Spring of 2013, Junior C hockey in Ontario had its first major realignment since the creation of the Georgian Mid-Ontario Junior C Hockey League in 1994. The 27 teams between the Niagara & District Junior C Hockey League and the Southern Ontario Junior Hockey League were reshuffled. The SOJHL went from 15 to 9 teams, gaining the Aylmer Spitfires, but losing their reigning champion Ayr Centennials, the Burford Bulldogs, Delhi Travellers, Hagersville Hawks, Norfolk Rebels, Tavistock Braves, and Wellesley Applejacks. That summer the Niagara League would divide in half, forming the Midwestern Junior C Hockey League with its former Western Division.

== The Teams ==
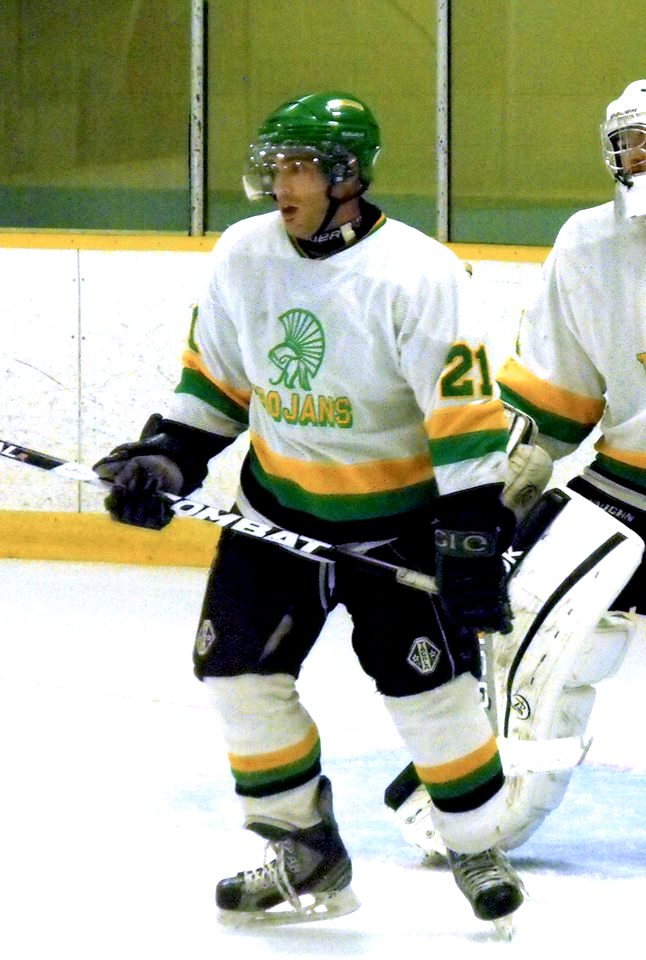
Thamesford Trojans player in 2014.

Team	Centre	Founded
Aylmer Spitfires	Aylmer	1974
Dorchester Dolphins	Dorchester	2012
Exeter Hawks	Exeter	1961
Lambeth Lancers	Lambeth	1987
Lucan Irish	Lucan	1968
Mount Brydges Bulldogs	Mount Brydges	1975
North Middlesex Stars	Parkhill	1993
Port Stanley Sailors	Port Stanley	2009
Thamesford Trojans	Thamesford	1976

== 2015-16 Playoffs ==
Winner moves on to the Clarence Schmalz Cup.

Quarter-final
1	Dorchester	4
8	Lambeth	0
4	Mount Brydges	4
5	Lucan	1
2	Exeter	4
7	Port Stanley	0
3	Aylmer	4
6	Thamesford	0

Semi-final
1	Dorchester	4
4	Mount Brydges	0
2	Exeter	4
3	Aylmer	0

Final
1	Dorchester	4
2	Exeter	3

== Champions ==
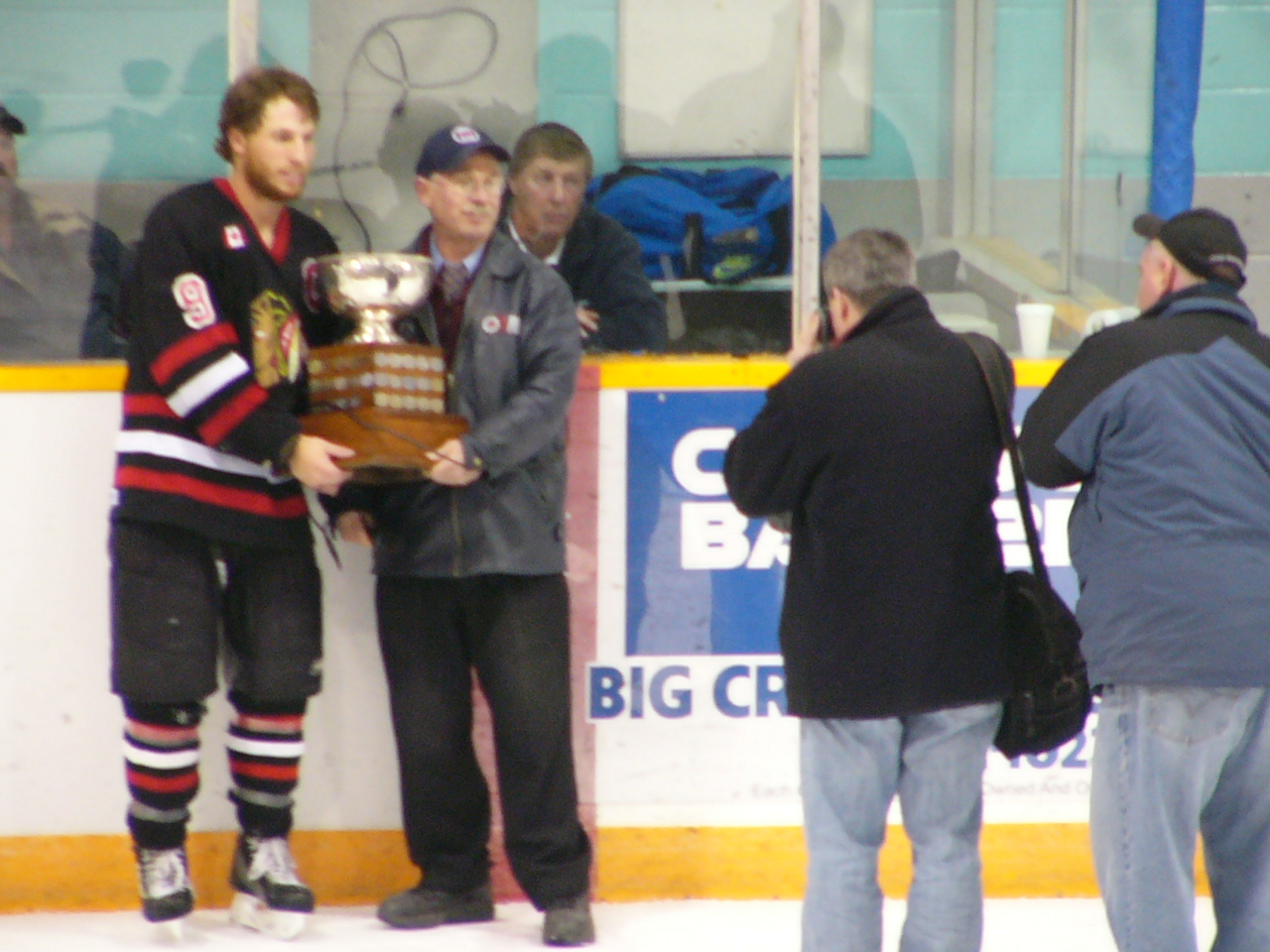
Mitchell Hawks Captain accepting OHA Cup as 2006-07 Playoff Champion.

=== League Title ===
From 1989 on, the winner of the league was also provincial champions and was awarded the OHA Cup. Bolded are league champions, italicized are runners-up in years with three divisions.

**Year**	**Champion**	**Finalist**	**Result in Provincials**
**Shamrock Jr. D**
1963	**Strathroy Rockets**	Forest Lakesides	**Won OHA Cup** vs. Uxbridge (E)
1964	**Hensall-Zurich Flyers**		**Won OHA Cup** vs. Stouffville (E)
1965
1966	**Belmont Sunsets**		Lost SF vs. Blenheim (BW)
1967	**Mitchell Hawks**		Lost Final vs. Tweed-Madoc (E)
1968	**Mitchell Hawks**		**Won OHA Cup** vs. Bobcaygeon (E)
1969	**Lambeth Flyers**		Lost SF vs. Caledonia (SC)
**Western Jr. D**
1970	**Exeter Hawks**	Zurich Dominions	Lost SF vs. Norwich (SC)
1971	**Exeter Hawks**	Belmont Sunsets	Lost Final vs. Haliburton (C)
1972	**Exeter Hawks**		**Won OHA Cup** vs. Bancroft (E)
1973	**Mitchell Hawks**		Lost Final vs. Bradford (SCL)
1974	**Belmont Bombers**		Lost Final vs. Stayner (SCL)
1975	**Belmont Bombers**		**Won OHA Cup** vs. Stayner (SCL)
1976	**Belmont Bombers**		Lost Final vs. Stayner (SCL)
1977	**Exeter Hawks**		**Won OHA Cup** vs. Stayner (MO)
**Year**	**North**	**South**	**Result in Provincials**
1978	**Exeter Hawks**		Lost Final vs. Lakefield (C)
1979
1980		**Belmont Bombers**	**Won OHA Cup** vs. Fergus (N)
1981		**Belmont Bombers**	**Won OHA Cup** vs. Delhi (SC)
1982	**Lucan Irish**		**Won OHA Cup** vs. Langton (SC)
1983	**Tavistock Braves**		**Won OHA Cup** vs. St. George (SC)
1984	Exeter Hawks	**Mount Brydges Bulldogs**	**Won OHA Cup** vs. Grand Valley (N)
1985
1986	**Seaforth Centenaires**		**Won OHA Cup** vs. Delhi (SC)
1987		**Lucan Irish**	**Won OHA Cup** vs. Tavistock (SC)
1988	Exeter Hawks	**Lambeth Lancers**	**Won OHA Cup** vs. Exeter

**Year**	**North**	**Central**	**South**
1989	Lucan Irish	**Lambeth Lancers**	Paris Mounties
1990	Lucan Irish	**Thamesford Trojans**	Ayr Centennials

**Year**	**Eastern**	**Western**
1991	**Thamesford Trojans**	Lucan Irish
**OHA Jr. Development League**
1992	**Thamesford Trojans**	Lucan Irish
1993	Thamesford Trojans	**Mitchell Hawks**
1994	Port Stanley Sailors	**Mitchell Hawks**
1995	**Thamesford Trojans**	Port Stanley Lakers
**Year**	**McConnell**	**Yeck**
1996	Wellesley Applejacks	**Exeter Hawks**
1997	Wellesley Applejacks	**Mount Brydges Bulldogs**
1998	**Wellesley Applejacks**	Exeter Hawks
1999	Wellesley Applejacks	**Lucan Irish**
2000	Burford Bulldogs	**Port Stanley Lakers**
2001	Wellesley Applejacks	**Mount Brydges Bulldogs**
2002	Tavistock Braves	**Exeter Hawks**
2003	Wellesley Applejacks	**Thamesford Trojans**
2004	Tavistock Braves	**Exeter Hawks**
2005	**Hagersville Hawks**	Mount Brydges Bulldogs
**Southern Ontario Jr. D**
2006	Delhi Travellers	**Lucan Irish**
2007	Delhi Travellers	**Mitchell Hawks**
2008	Tavistock Braves	**Thamesford Trojans**

**Year**	**McConnell**	**Bauer**	**Yeck**
2009	Delhi Travellers	Thamesford Trojans	**North Middlesex Stars**
2010	Delhi Travellers	**Thamesford Trojans**	Exeter Hawks

**Year**	**McConnell**	**Yeck**
2011	Ayr Centennials	**Thamesford Trojans**
2012	Hagersville Hawks	**Thamesford Trojans**

**Southern Ontario Jr. C**
**Year**	**McConnell**	**Yeck**	**Result in Provincials**
2013	**Ayr Centennials**	Lambeth Lancers	Lost CSC QF vs. Essex (GL)
**Year**	**Champion**	**Finalist**	**Result in Provincials**
2014	**Dorchester Dolphins**	Lambeth Lancers	Lost CSC QF vs. Essex (GL)
2015	**Exeter Hawks**	Dorchester Dolphins	Lost CSC QF vs. Essex (GL)
2016	**Dorchester Dolphins**	Exeter Hawks	Lost CSC QF vs. Essex (GL)

== Regular season champions ==
This chart starts at the unification of the Junior D leagues, through the SOJHL's ascension to Junior C, until its merger into the Provincial Junior Hockey League in 2016.

Season	Champion	Record	Points
Western Jr. D League
1988-89	Lucan Irish	30-6-0-0	60
1989-90	Lucan Irish	25-4-6-0	56
1990-91	Thamesford Trojans	34-1-2-2	72
OHA Junior Development League
1991-92	Thamesford Trojans	26-7-1-1	54
1992-93	Lucan Irish	33-3-2-1	69
1993-94	Port Stanley Lakers	36-2-2-0	74
1994-95	Thamesford Trojans	34-2-3-0	71
1995-96	Exeter Hawks	30-4-4-0	64
1996-97	Mount Brydges Bulldogs	34-3-0-1	69
1997-98	Wellesley Applejacks	28-7-1-1	58
1998-99	Wellesley Applejacks	30-7-1-0	61
1999-00	Port Stanley Lakers	31-9-0-0	62
2000-01	Port Stanley Lakers	29-8-1-2	61
2001-02	Exeter Hawks	30-6-3-1	64
2002-03	Exeter Hawks	29-8-3-0	61
2003-04	Hagersville Hawks	28-4-3-5	64
2004-05	Hagersville Hawks	31-7-2-0	64
2005-06	Delhi Travellers	29-6-3-0	61
Southern Ontario Jr. D League
2006-07	Tavistock Braves	34-7-0-1	69
2007-08	Mount Brydges Bulldogs	36-3-0-1	73
2008-09	Mount Brydges Bulldogs	33-6-0-1	67
2009-10	North Middlesex Stars	30-4-0-2	62
2010-11	Tavistock Braves	26-6-0-3	55
2011-12	Thamesford Trojans	26-6-0-4	56
Southern Ontario Jr. C League
2012-13	Lambeth Lancers	29-5-0-3	61
2013-14	Lambeth Lancers	31-8-0-1	63
2014-15	Lambeth Lancers	31-7-0-2	64
2015-16	Dorchester Dolphins	35-5-0-0	70

== Former Member Teams ==
- Alvinston Flyers
- Ayr Centennials
- Bothwell Barons
- Burford Bulldogs
- Delhi Travellers
- Hagersville Hawks
- Hanover Hurricanes
- Hensall-Zurich Combines
- Lambeth Flyers
- Langton Thunderbirds
- Mitchell Hawks
- Ohsweken Golden Eagles
- Paris Mounties
- Port Dover Sailors
- St. George Dukes
- Seaforth Centenaires
- Strathroy Falcons
- Tavistock Braves
- Thedford Browns
- Wellesley Applejacks
- West Lorne Lakers
- Zurich Dominions
