= Golden Horseshoe Junior Hockey League =

Junior ice hockey league in Ontario

- Association: Ontario Hockey Association
- Founded: 1974
- Ceased: 2007
- Last champion: St. Catharines Falcons (2007)

The Golden Horseshoe Junior Hockey League (GHL) was a junior ice hockey league in Ontario, Canada, sanctioned by the Ontario Hockey Association from 1974 until 2007. In 2007, the league became a division of the newly formed Greater Ontario Junior Hockey League along with the Mid-Western Junior Hockey League and Western Ontario Hockey League.

== History ==
The year 1974 saw the founding of the Golden Horseshoe Junior B Hockey League. The league consisted mostly of "inner ring" teams from the Niagara District Junior B Hockey League. The "outer ring" teams maintained with the Niagara league. In 1978, the Golden Horseshoe league jumped from six to nine teams by swallowing the majority of the short-lived Southwestern Junior B Hockey League. A season later, the Niagara District league folded and their final champion, the Fort Erie Meteors, came aboard as the GHL's tenth team.

In 1995-96 and 1996–97, the GHL played an interlocking schedule with USA Hockey's North Eastern Junior Hockey League. In 1997-98, the league even allowed the expansion of one of the NEJHL's teams, the Rochester Jr. Americans for a single season.

In 2005-06, the GHL allowed another former NEJHL team, the Wheatfield Jr. Blades, to participate in the league.

In 2007, the league merged with the Western Ontario Hockey League and the Mid-Western Junior Hockey League to form the Greater Ontario Junior Hockey League.

== 2007-08 season ==
For information on the 2007-08 season, please see: Greater Ontario Junior Hockey League.

== Final teams ==
These are the teams that were in the league during its final independent season (2006-07).

- Fort Erie Meteors
- Niagara Falls Canucks
- Port Colborne Sailors
- St. Catharines Falcons
- Stoney Creek Warriors
- Thorold Blackhawks
- Welland Jr. Canadians
- Wheatfield Jr. Blades

== Other former members ==
- Brantford Classics
- Buffalo Jr. Sabres
- Caledonia Corvairs
- Dundas Blues
- Dunnville Terriers
- Grimsby Peach Kings
- Hamilton Mountain Bees
- Hamilton Red Wings
- Simcoe Jets
- Tillsonburg Mavericks

== Former interleague opponents ==
- Pittsburgh Renegades
- Rochester Jr. Americans
- Springfield Jr. Indians

== Playoff Champions ==
Year	Champion	Finalist	Result in Provincials
1975	Hamilton Red Wings		Lost SF vs. Oakville (C)
1976	St. Catharines Falcons		Lost QF vs. St. Marys (WO)
1977	St. Catharines Falcons		Lost SF vs. Streetsville (C)
1978	St. Catharines Falcons		Lost QF vs. Windsor (WO)
1979	St. Catharines Falcons		Lost Final vs. Streetsville (C)
1980	Welland Cougars		Lost SF vs. Windsor (WO)
1981	St. Catharines Falcons		Lost SF vs. Stratford (MW)
1982	St. Catharines Falcons		Lost QF vs. Sarnia (WO)
1983	Welland Cougars
1984	Brantford Alexander B's
1985	St. Catharines Falcons
1986	St. Catharines Falcons
1987	Niagara Falls Canucks		Lost Final vs. St. Thomas (WO)
1988	Niagara Falls Canucks		Lost SF vs. Bramalea (Met)
1989	Niagara Falls Canucks		Lost Final vs. St. Michael's (Met)
1990	St. Catharines Falcons		Lost Final vs. Stratford (MW)
1991	Welland Aerostars		Lost SF vs. Oakville (C)
1992	St. Catharines Falcons		Lost SF vs. Milton (C)
1993	Hamilton Kilty B's		Lost SF vs. Barrie (C)
1994	St. Catharines Falcons		Lost Final vs. Waterloo (MW)
1995	Niagara Falls Canucks		Lost in Round Robin
1996	Niagara Falls Canucks		Won SC vs. St. Thomas (WO)
1997	St. Catharines Falcons		Lost Final vs. Elmira (MW)
1998	Niagara Falls Canucks		Won SC vs. Elmira (MW)
1999	St. Catharines Falcons	Niagara Falls Canucks	Lost in Round Robin
2000	St. Catharines Falcons	Thorold Blackhawks	Lost Final vs. Cambridge (MW)
2001	Thorold Blackhawks	Port Colborne Sailors	Lost Final vs. Elmira (MW)
2002	Niagara Falls Canucks	Thorold Blackhawks	Lost in Round Robin
2003	Thorold Blackhawks	Niagara Falls Canucks	Lost Final vs. Stratford (MW)
2004	Thorold Blackhawks	Niagara Falls Canucks	Lost Final vs. Stratford (MW)
2005	Thorold Blackhawks	Niagara Falls Canucks	Won SC vs. Chatham (WO)
2006	Niagara Falls Canucks	Thorold Blackhawks	Lost Final vs. Cambridge (MW)
2007	St. Catharines Falcons	Niagara Falls Canucks	Lost in Round Robin

== Records ==
Records taken from Official Website.

- Best record: 1997-98 Niagara Falls Canucks (43-3-3)
- Worst record: 1993-94 Fort Erie Meteors (1-38-1)
