= Dundas Blues =

Canadian junior ice hockey team

- City: Dundas, Ontario
- League: Provincial Junior Hockey League
- Conference: South
- Division: Bloomfield
- Founded: 1959
- Home arena: J.L. Grightmire Arena
- Colours: Blue, Yellow, and White
- Owner: Community (Steve Aglor - president)
- General manager: Steve Aglor
- Head coach: Dane O’Neill
- Website: Dundas Blues

Franchise history
- 1959 to present: Dundas Blues

Championships
- Playoff championships: 1992, 1993,2026

The Dundas Blues are a junior ice hockey team based in Dundas, Ontario, Canada. They are members of the Bloomfield Division (South Conference) of the Provincial Junior Hockey League of the Ontario Hockey Association.

== History ==
The team was founded in 1959 as the Dundas Merchants. The Merchants played in the massive Central Junior C Hockey League. In 1966, the league was divided up and the Merchants began playing in the Intercounty Junior C Hockey League.

In 1971, the team was promoted to the newly aligned Central Junior B Hockey League. With the new league, the team was re-dubbed the Dundas Blues.

The Blues jumped to the newly formed Golden Horseshoe Junior B Hockey League in 1974. They were members of this league until 1981.

The 1981 season saw them join the Niagara & District Junior C Hockey League. A league that they stayed in until the end of the 2015–16 season. In the summer of 2016 the eight Southern Ontario Junior "C" leagues agreed to amalgamate and each league become a division in the Provincial Junior Hockey League. Two divisions also grouped into Conferences and the Niagara & District renamed the Bloomfield Division and aligned in the South Conference.

== Season-by-season results ==
Season	GP	W	L	T	OTL	GF	GA	P	Results	Playoffs
1959-60	23	7	15	1	-	58	81	15	5th NDJBHL	
1960-61	17	3	10	4	-	57	83	10	6th NDJBHL	Folded
1961-62	30	10	20	0	-	101	132	20	5th CJCHL	
1962-63	26	4	19	3	-	109	181	11	6th CJCHL	
1963-64	29	10	16	3	-	135	164	23	5th CJCHL	
1964-65	31	15	16	0	-	135	165	30	6th CJCHL	
1965-66	31	7	22	2	-	112	211	16	11th CJCHL	
1966-67	30	24	6	0	-	193	89	48	1st ICJCHL	
1967-68	32	12	17	3	-	129	136	27	4th ICJCHL	
1968-69	18	11	6	1	-	--	--	23	4th ICJCHL	Lost final
1969-70	30	17	12	1	-	174	115	35	4th ICJCHL	
1970-71	22	4	13	5	-	65	98	13	4th ICJCHL	
1971-72	42	9	29	4	-	147	236	22	8th CJBHL	
1972-73	42	9	30	3	-	178	259	21	8th CJBHL	
1973-74	42	8	30	4	-	174	264	20	7th CBJHL	
1974-75	40	8	27	5	-	171	271	21	5th GHJHL	
1975-76	40	17	18	5	-	243	242	39	3rd GHJHL	
1976-77	32	7	20	5	-	158	216	19	5th GHJHL	
1977-78	40	2	34	4	-	171	374	8	6th GHJHL	
1978-79	42	10	29	3	-	168	338	23	7th GHJHL	
1979-80	44	6	35	3	-	193	350	15	10th GHJHL	
1980-81	42	11	29	2	-	187	298	24	7th GHJHL	
1981-82	32	8	19	5	-	--	--	21	7th NJC-C	
1982-83	36	6	23	7	-	--	--	19	7th NJC-W	
1983-84	30	18	7	5	-	--	--	41	2nd NJC-W	
1984-85	34	13	19	2	-	172	192	28	6th NJCHL	
1985-86	36	10	20	6	-	--	--	26	4th NJC-E	
1986-87	34	25	6	3	-	--	--	53	1st NJC-E	
1987-88	36	18	14	4	-	--	--	40	4th NJC-W	
1988-89	36	27	6	3	-	--	--	57	1st NJC-W	
1989-90	36	13	14	9	-	--	--	35	5th NJC-W	
1990-91	34	26	5	3	-	--	--	55	1st NJC-W	
1991-92	34	18	9	7	-	182	150	43	3rd NJC-W	Won League
1992-93	42	27	11	4	-	312	193	58	3rd NJC-E	Won League, lost CSC SF
1993-94	42	27	11	4	-	277	210	58	2nd NJC-E	
1994-95	36	19	13	4	-	204	175	42	3rd NJC-E	
1995-96	36	12	17	7	-	162	159	31	5th NJC-E	
1996-97	36	16	18	0	2	176	177	34	4th NJC-E	
1997-98	42	18	17	6	1	162	161	43	4th NJC-E	
1998-99	35	12	20	1	2	137	213	27	5th NJC-E	
1999-00	35	15	17	-	3	170	173	33	5th NJC-E	Won Preliminary round 4-3 (Peach Kings); Lost Div. quarter-final 2-4 (Corvairs)
2000-01	36	23	12	1	0	188	167	47	2nd NJC-E	Won Div. quarter-final 4-3 (Corvairs); Lost semi-final 1-4 (Peach Kings)
2001-02	36	23	9	2	2	151	123	50	3rd NJC-E	Won Div. quarter-final 4-1 (Corvairs); Lost semi-final 3-4 (Peach Kings)
2002-03	36	22	8	3	3	167	126	50	2nd NJCHL	Won Div. semi-final 4-1 (Riverhawks); Lost Div. final 2-4 (Peach Kings)
2003-04	36	23	12	1	0	167	139	47	4th NJCHL	Won Div. semi-final 4-0 (Riverhawks); Lost Div. final 1-4 (Peach Kings)
2004-05	36	24	10	2	0	162	100	50	3rd NJCHL	Won Div. semi-final 4-0 (Riverhawks); Lost Div. final 0-4 (Peach Kings)
2005-06	36	20	13	2	1	159	125	43	4th NJCHL	Won quarter-final 4-0 (Rangers); Lost semi-final 0-4 (Peach Kings)
2006-07	36	21	12	1	2	193	147	45	6th NJCHL	Won quarter-final 4-0 (Corvairs); Lost semi-final 1-4 (Peach Kings)
2007-08	35	19	12	3	1	167	122	42	7th NJCHL	Won preliminary round 4-0 (Terriers); Lost quarter-final 3-4 (Rangers)
2008-09	36	24	8	-	4	172	119	52	3rd NJCHL	Won quarter-final 4-0 (Rangers); Lost semi-final 2-4 (Peach Kings)
2009-10	36	21	15	-	0	144	133	42	5th NCJHL	Won Div. quarter-final 4-1 (Terriers); Won Div. semi-final 4-1 (Riverhawks); Lost Div. Final 2-4 (Peach Kings)
2010-11	36	20	13	-	3	154	141	43	5th NJCHL	Won Div. quarter-final 4-0 (Riverhawks); Lost Div. semi-final 2-4 (Rangers)
2011-12	36	16	19	-	1	116	153	33	8th NJCHL	Won Div. quarter-final 3-4 (Riverhawks)
2012-13	38	18	16	-	4	154	139	40	5th NJC-E	Won Div. quarter-final 4-2 (Riverhawks); Lost Div. semi-final 0-4 (Rangers)
2013-14	35	19	15	-	1	130	113	39	5th NJCHL	Won quarter-final 4-2 (Riverhawks); Lost semi-final 4-1 (Peach Kings)
2014-15	42	28	10	-	4	193	106	60	2nd NJCHL	Won quarter-final 4-1 (Sailors); Won semi-final 4-0 Jr. Mudcats); Lost League Final 1-4 (Peach Kings)
2015-16	42	29	11	1	1	183	116	60	3rd of 8 NJCHL	Won quarters - 4-0 - (Jr. Mudcats); Lost semifinals 3-4 (Peach Kings)
2016-17	42	21	19	2	-	155	152	44	5th of 8-PJHL; Bloomfield Div	Won Div Quarters - 4–2 (Sailors); Lost div semi-finals 1-4 (Rangers)
2017-18	42	21	19	2	-	141	155	44	4th of 8-PJHL; Bloomfield Div	Won Div Quarters 4-2 (Hawks); Lost div semi-finals 0-4 (Rangers)
Dundas Blues
2019-20	42	18	19	4	1	139	164	41	4th of 8-PJHL; Bloomfield Div	Lost Div quarter-final 1-4 (Shamrocks)
2020-21	Season Lost due to COVID-19 pandemic									
2021-22	30	18	9	0	3	101	78	39	4th of 8-PJHL; Bloomfield Div	Lost Div quarter-final 2-4 (Rangers)
2022-23	42	15	19	5	3	133	148	38	5th of 8-PJHL; Bloomfield Div	Lost Div quarter-final 3-4 (Riverhawks)
2023-24	42	28	13	1	0	195	141	57	2nd of 7-PJHL; Bloomfield Div	Won Div quarter-final 4-0 (Sailors); Won Div semi-final 4-3 (Rangers); Lost Div. Final 1-4 (Peach Kings)
2024-25	42	35	6	0	1	199	110	71	1st of 8 Bloomfield Div; 1st 0f 16 South Conf; 6th of 63 - PJHL	Won Div quarter-final 4-0 (Sailors); Won Div semi-final 4-0 (Hawks); Lost Div. Final 0-4 (Peach Kings)
2025-26	42	34	7	1	0	242	138	69	1st of 8 Bloomfield Div; 1st 0f 16 South Conf; 4th of 61 - PJHL	Won Div quarter-final 4-0 (Hawks); Won Div semi-final 4-1 (Rangers); Won Div. Final 4-1 (Riverhawks); Lost S. Conf 1-4 (Braves)
