= Gale Centre =

Arena in Niagara Falls, Ontario

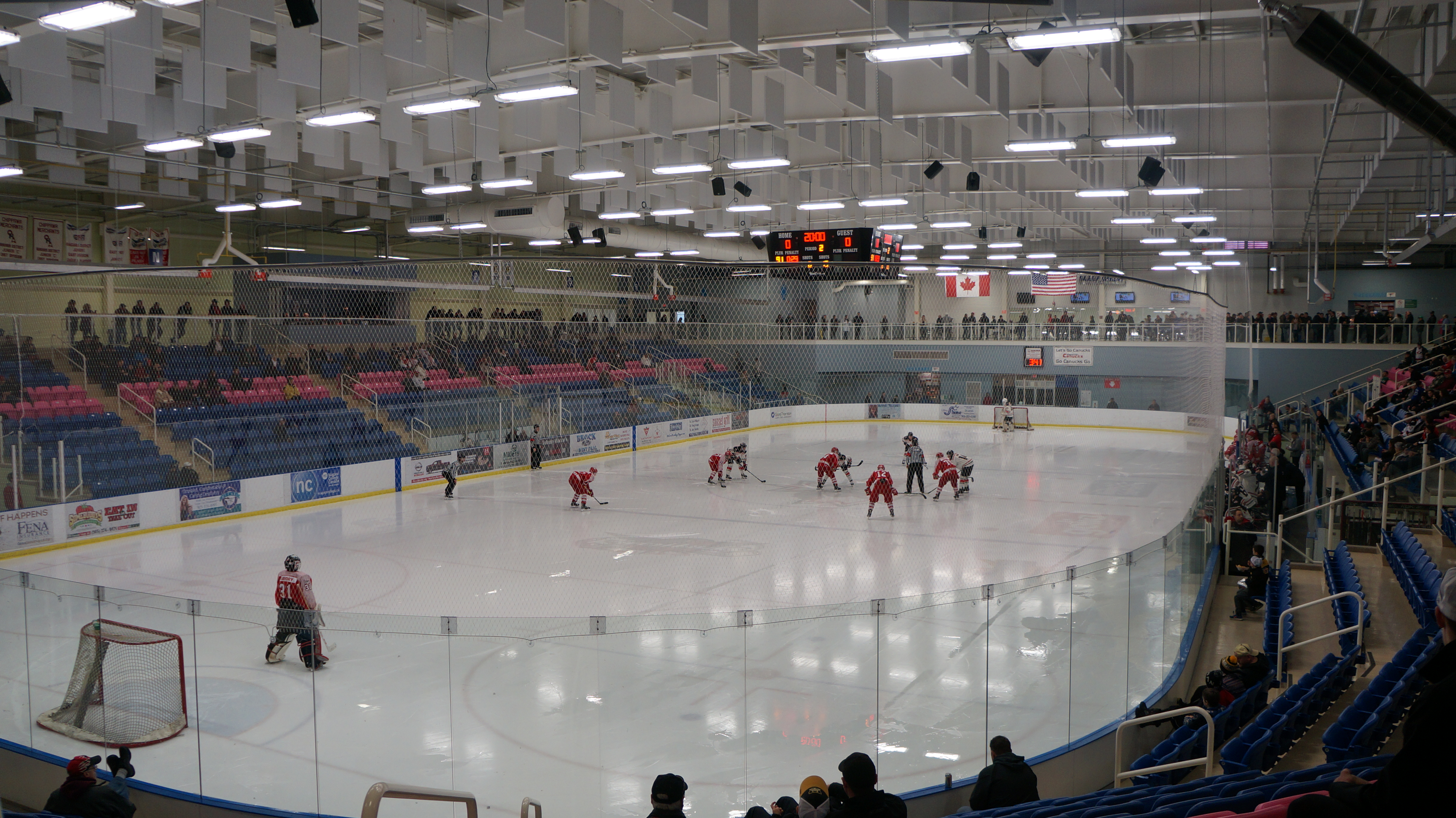
- Interactive map of Gale Centre
- Coordinates: 43°6′49″N 79°4′50″W
- Owner: Niagara Falls, Ontario
- Capacity: 2,170

Gale Centre is a four rink ice complex containing a 2,170 seat arena located in Niagara Falls, Ontario. It was built on the site of the demolished Cyanamid Niagara plant.
