= Glanbrook Rangers =

Canadian junior ice hockey team

- City: Glanbrook, Ontario
- League: Provincial Junior Hockey League
- Conference: South
- Division: Bloomfield
- Founded: 1975
- Home arena: Glanbrook Arena
- Colours: Red, Blue, and White
- General manager: Brian Cleary (202?-present)
- Head coach: Stu Wright (2025-present)
- Website: https://glanbrookrangers.pjhlon.hockeytech.com

Championships
- League champions: 1997, 1998, 1999, 2018, 2023
- Clarence Schmalz Cups: 1997, 1998, 1999

The Glanbrook Rangers are a Junior ice hockey team based in Glanbrook, Ontario, Canada. They are playing in the Provincial Junior Hockey League. The Rangers are only the second Ontario Hockey Association team to have claimed three consecutive Clarence Schmalz Cups as Junior C champions, winning in 1997, 1998, and 1999. The Rangers are members of the Bloomfield Division in the Southern Conference.

== History ==
The Rangers reigned over their league and the Ontario Hockey Association from the 1996-97 season until 1999 with three consecutive Clarence Schmalz Cups as the best Junior C hockey team in Ontario.

== Season-by-season record ==
Note: GP = Games Played, W = Wins, L = Losses, T = Ties, OTL = Overtime Losses, GF = Goals for, GA = Goals against

Season	GP	W	L	T	OTL	GF	GA	Points	Finish	Playoffs
1975-76	36	8	23	5	-	--	--	21	6th NJCHL	
1976-77	30	18	8	4	-	--	--	40	3rd NJCHL	
1977-78	36	18	14	4	-	--	--	40	3rd NJCHL	Lost final
1978-79	39	20	14	5	-	244	177	45	2nd NJC-E	
1979-80	41	16	22	3	-	214	240	35	5th NJC-W	
1980-81	32	16	11	5	-	--	--	37	2nd NJC-W	
1981-82	31	15	9	7	-	--	--	37	2nd NCJ-C	
1982-83	29	13	15	1	-	--	--	27	5th NCJ-E	
1983-84	40	5	29	6	-	--	--	16	6th NJC-E	
1984-85	34	2	27	5	-	100	236	9	8th NJCHL	
1985-86	36	12	21	3	-	--	--	27	3rd NJC-E	
1986-87	32	13	17	2	-	--	--	28	3rd NJC-C	
1987-88	37	14	18	5	-	172	164	33	3rd NJC-E	
1988-89	40	17	14	9	-	--	--	43	4th NJC-E	
1989-90	40	19	17	4	-	--	--	42	3rd NJC-E	
1990-91	36	15	18	3	-	188	209	33	3rd NJC-E	
1991-92	36	11	20	5	-	136	199	26	6th NJC-E	
1992-93	42	12	26	4	-	191	272	28	6th NJC-E	
1993-94	41	28	10	3	-	230	162	59	1st NJC-E	
1994-95	36	16	14	6	-	159	134	38	4th NJC-E	
1995-96	36	32	3	1	-	252	86	65	1st NJC-E	Won Semi-Final 4-3 (McCoys); Lost final 1-4 (Mounties)
1996-97	36	28	5	2	1	196	103	59	2nd NJC-E	Won League, won CSC Semi-Final 4-0 (Chiefs); Won CSC Final 4-2 (Canadiens)
1997-98	42	37	1	4	0	295	73	78	1st NJC-E	Won League, won CSC Semi-Final 4-1 (Merchants); Won CSC Final 4-1 (Bulldogs)
1998-99	36	33	2	1	0	209	68	67	1st NJC-E	Won League, won CSC Semi-Final 4-1 (Chiefs); Won CSC Final 4-0 (Lakers)
1999-00	36	19	13	-	4	129	125	42	3rd NJC-E	Lost Division Quarter-Final 3-4 (Corvairs)
2000-01	36	21	13	2	0	187	145	44	4th NJC-E	Lost Division Quarter-Final 2-4 (Peach Kings)
2001-02	36	18	14	2	2	135	131	40	4th NJC-E	Lost Division Quarter-Final 3-4 (Peach Kings)
2002-03	36	13	17	4	2	132	149	32	7th NJCHL	Lost Division Quarter-Final 2-4 (Terriers)
2003-04	36	11	17	5	3	118	148	30	7th NJCHL	Won Division Quarter-Final 4-0 (Corvairs); Lost Quarter-Final 0-4 (Peach Kings)
2004-05	36	17	15	3	1	169	139	38	7th NJCHL	Won preliminary round 4-0 (Terriers); Lost Quarter-Final 0-4 (Peach Kings)
2005-06	36	15	15	3	3	139	149	36	6th NJCHL	Lost Quarter-Final 0-4 (Blues)
2006-07	36	17	17	1	1	200	196	36	8th NJCHL	
2007-08	36	20	11	2	3	172	136	45	5th NJCHL	Won Quarter-Final 4-3 (Blues); Lost Semi-Final 0-4 (Peach Kings)
2008-09	36	20	13	-	3	153	133	43	6th NJCHL	Won preliminary round 4-0 (Terriers); Lost Quarter-Final 0-4 (Blues)
2009-10	36	15	16	-	5	146	170	35	8th NJCHL	Won Division Quarter-Final 4-1 (Corvairs); Lost Division Semi-Final 0-4 (Peach Kings)
2010-11	36	20	13	-	3	157	133	43	4th NJCHL	Won Division Semi-Final 4-2 (Blues); Lost Division Final 1-4 (Peach Kings)
2011-12	36	26	7	-	3	175	104	55	3rd NJCHL	Won Division Semi-Final 4-1 (Corvairs); Lost Division Final 0-4 (Peach Kings)
2012-13	38	28	10	-	0	152	105	56	1st NJC-E	Won Division Semi-Final 4-0 (Blues); Lost Division Final 2-4 (Peach Kings)
2013-14	35	13	18	-	4	116	153	30	6th NJCHL	Lost quarter-final 1-4 (Mudcats)
2014-15	42	23	17	-	2	171	150	48	4th NJCHL	Lost quarter-final, 3-4 (Hawks)
2015-16	42	31	10	-	1	213	121	63	1st of 8 NJCHL	Won quarter-final, 4-0 (Storm); Won semi-final, 4-3 (Hawks); Lost final, 3-4 (Peach Kings)
2016-17	42	29	11	2	-	213	125	60	2nd of 8 PJHL, Bloomfield Div.	Won Div. QF, 4-1 (Riverhawks); Won Div. SF, 4-1 (Blues); Lost Div. Final, 2-4 (Peach Kings)
2017-18	42	38	3	0	1	283	111	77	1st of 8 PJHL, Bloomfield Div.	Won Div. QF, 4-0 (Storm); Won Div. SF, 4-0 (Blues); Won Div. Final, 4-3 (Peach Kings); Won South Conf. Final 4-0 (Braves); Won CSC Semifinals 4-2 (Lancers); Lost CSC Final, 1-4 (Chiefs)
2018-19	42	36	4	0	2	236	81	74	2nd of 8 PJHL, Bloomfield Div.	Won Div. QF, 4-0 (Shamrocks); Won Div. SF, 4-0 (Jr Blues); Lost Div. Final, 3-4 (Peach Kings)
2019-20	42	28	10	3	1	160	87	60	3rd of 9 PJHL, Bloomfield Div.	Won Div. QF, 4-1 (Riverhawks); Won Div. SF, 4-0 (Hawks) incomplete Div. Final, 1-1(Peach Kings); Playoffs cancelled due to covid
2020-21	Season Lost due to COVID-19 pandemic									
2021-22	30	16	8	4	2	85	49	38	3rd of 9 PJHL, Bloomfield Div.	Won Div. QF, 4-2 (Hawks); Won Div. SF, 4-2 (Blues); Lost Div. Finals, 2-4 (Peach Kings)
2022-23	42	35	3	3	1	210	94	74	1st of 7 PJHL, Bloomfield Div.	Div. QF, bye tbd Div. SF, 4-1 (Riverhawks); Won Div. Finals, 4-1 (Peach Kings); L South Conf Finals, 1-4 (Applejacks)
2023-24	42	25	14	2	1	177	127	53	3rd of 7 PJHL, Bloomfield Div.	Won Div. QF, 4-0 (Mudcats); Lost Div Semifinal, 3-4 (Blues)
2024-25	42	23	16	0	3	165	143	49	5th of 8 Bloomfield Div; 8th of 16 South Conf; 29th of 63 PJHL	Lost Div. QF, 4-2 (Hawks)
2025-26	42	21	16	4	1	216	190	47	4th of 8 Bloomfield Div; 9th of 16 South Conf; 32nd of 61 PJHL	Won Div. QF, 4-2 (Streetsville Derbys); Lost Div Semifinals 1-4 (Dundas Blues)

== Clarence Schmalz Cup appearances ==
1997: Glanbrook Rangers defeated Belle River Canadiens 4-games-to-2
1998: Glanbrook Rangers defeated Kincardine Bulldogs 4-games-to-1
1999: Glanbrook Rangers defeated Wallaceburg Lakers 4-games-to-none
2018: Lakefield Chiefs defeated Glanbrook Rangers 4-games-to-1
