= Grimsby Peach Kings =

Canadian junior ice hockey team

- City: Grimsby, Ontario
- League: Provincial Junior Hockey League
- Conference: PJHL South
- Division: Bloomfield
- Founded: 1922
- Home arena: Peach King Centre
- Colours: Maroon, white, and gold
- Owner: Simon Duong
- General manager: Simon Duong
- Head coach: Dave Brownridge

Championships
- League champions: 2003, 2004, 2005, 2007, 2008, 2010, 2011, 2012, 2013, 2014, 2015, 2016, 2018, 2019, 2022, 2024, 2025
- Clarence Schmalz Cups: 1940, 2003, 2004, 2011, 2012

The Grimsby Peach Kings are a Canadian junior ice hockey team from Grimsby, Ontario and play in the Provincial Junior Hockey League.

== History ==
One of the oldest hockey clubs in Ontario, the Peach Kings officially joined the Ontario Hockey Association in 1922. However, the "Peach Kings" moniker had been used for local sports teams for several decades prior. The name refers to Grimsby's unique ability to cultivate peaches, a fruit that cannot be farmed without proper conditions. Grimsby's location between Lake Ontario and the Niagara Escarpment plus soil types allow for this.

In the early 1920s, Col. Roberts had built a large cold storage facility for fruit in the summer that had ample capacity to make ice in the winter. In turn, work began on an arena in the summer of 1921. When the arena opened in January 1922, it was one of only eight arenas in the world and the Montreal Canadiens soon took advantage of it for their training camp. Shortly after, the professional Saskatoon Sheiks (who were later sold to New York to become the Rangers) also held training camps in Grimsby, and the town became an overnight hockey hotspot.

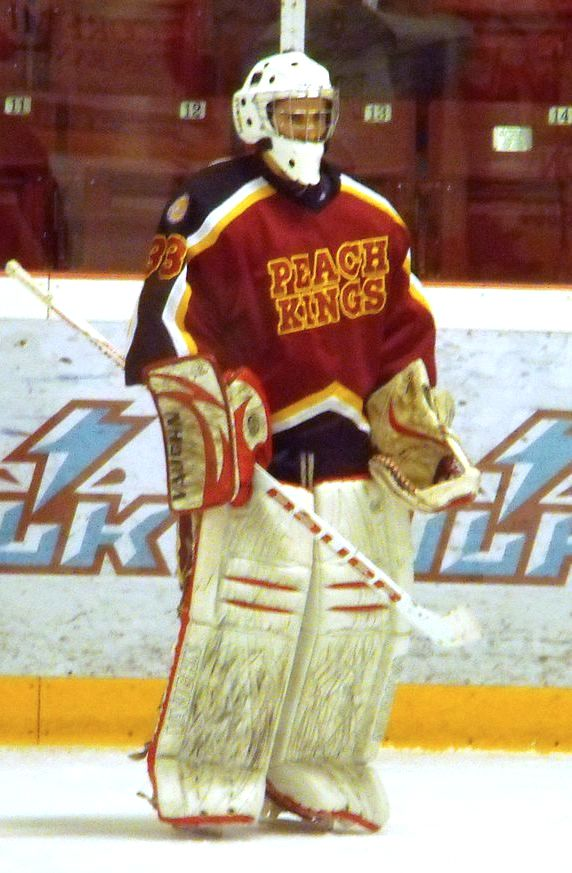
Grimsby goalie in warm-ups in 2012 playoffs

For the 1924-25 season, sponsors got involved and began scouring Ontario for the best hockey players to play for the Peach Kings. When this squad took to the ice in the fall of 1924, they skated on the same ice as Hall of Famers Howie Morenz, Georges Vézina, and Aurel Joliat skated on for training camp with the Canadiens. With Pud Reid as their captain, they took the league title that year, playing against Brantford, Niagara Falls, Welland, Port Colborne, and Dunnville. In the OHA Intermediate A playoffs, the Peach Kings eliminated Paris, Toronto, and New Hamburg on their way to the finals. They beat Kingston in a two-game series to take the OHA championship.

In accordance with the custom of the time, the Intermediate champions would play the previous year's Allan Cup champions, the top senior amateur team in Canada. What was supposed to be a decisive victory for the famous Sault Ste. Marie Greyhounds over Grimsby turned out differently. With only 1,000 fans watching at Toronto's Mutual St. Arena (the precursor to Maple Leaf Gardens) what was expected to a blowout, the Grimsby upstarts led 3-0 after two periods. The Greyhounds scored twice in the 3rd, but it was not enough as Grimsby held on. This marked the only time in history the Allan Cup titleholders lost to the Intermediates.

Several players from the team would turn to play professionally: Gerry Carson went on to play for the Montreal Canadiens; Shorty Horne played for the Toronto Maple Leafs; and Pop McVicar, Artie Clark, and Pud Reid all played for the Chicago Cardinals of the American Association.

In 1939-40, the Peach Kings won the OHA Jr. C final. Featuring Ralph Reid, Mush Miller, and Red Mason, the Peach Kings defeated Bolton to face Markham in the provincial final. Games were held in Grimsby and the famed Maple Leaf Gardens. They brought home a second provincial championship and won the Clarence Schmalz Cup (though it was yet to be named that).

Returning to Intermediate hockey after World War II, the Peach Kings had more good years. They won their local Fruitbelt League in 1946 and 1947, but lost to Owen Sound in the OHA playoffs in 1946. In 1947, they made it to the OHA finals to play the Markham Millionaires in a best of five series. With the Peach Kings leading the series 2-1, the series shifted to Grimsby ice. Fans lined up all afternoon to get into the tiny arena, and eventually over 2,000 packed the rink to watch a 3-3 tie after 60 minutes. The 10-minute overtime period was not sudden death like it is today, and Markham scored early. With less than 2 minutes remaining, Grimsby rookie Barry Blanchard wound up behind his own net, carried the puck down the ice, and dropped it to Norman Warner who evened the score. With 39 seconds remaining, William Hutchison put the puck past the Markham goalie to win the Provincial Championship. Ralph Reid was the captain of the 1947 champions; he is the son of Harry 'Pud' Reid, the captain of the 1925 Intermediate champions.

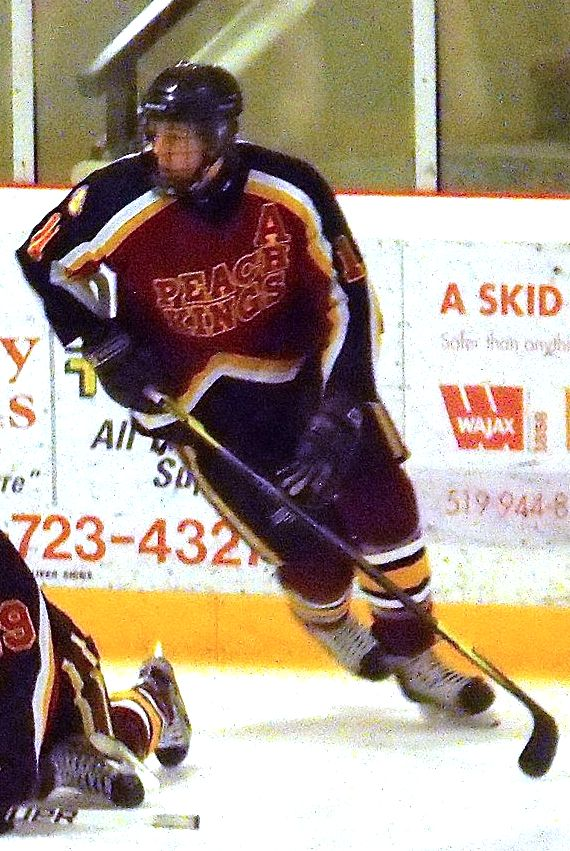
Grimsby players warm up in 2012 playoffs.

The Peach Kings struggled through the 50s, 60s, 70s, and 80s, but almost always retained a team wearing the Peach Kings sweater. Fortunes reversed,, however when the team was purchased in the mid-1990s and re-emerged as a Junior "C" team. By 2001, the team was strong, claiming 1st place in the league for the 2002-03 season. In the playoffs, they dismissed Dunnville, Dundas, Norwich and the defending Ontario champion Essex 73's on the way to the OHA finals. Led by captain Dean Davidson and stars Matt Hodges, Kyle Hodges, Biff Fuller, Don Forbes, Ryan Toth, and Josh Horley, the Peach Kings beat Georgina in four games to claim the Provincial "C" Championship for the first time since 1940.

The following year with many of the same players, as well as new ones such as Jay Anderson, Derek Nichols and Steve Foster playing a larger role, the Peach Kings won again, this time over Wingham in the finals. These were the first back-to-back championships in team history. The following year, 2004–05, the Peach Kings made a run for the finals again, led by Hodges, Fuller, Toth, Nichols, Anderson, and Foster, with newcomers like star goalie Steve Mason, Dan Ellis, Joel Bristo, Joel Agnew, and returnee Scott Clark. The Peach Kings played to the finals again, looking to win for a third straight time. Taking a 3-2 series lead over the Essex 73's into the Grimsby Arena, it looked like Grimsby would win again, having not lost at home all season. Essex, making their first of five straight Clarence Schmalz Cup finals appearances, fought back, won Game 6 and Game 7 in Essex, and reclaimed the provincial title which Grimsby had held for the previous two years.

At the 2008 IIHF World Junior Hockey Championships, former Peach King goaltender Steve Mason led the Canadian National Team to a fourth straight gold medal. He went 5-0 with a .951 save percentage at the tournament and won various awards: First Team All-Star, Top Goalie in the tournament, and MVP of the Tournament.

Grimsby claimed eight straight Niagara East division titles from 2003 to 2010, and finished in the final eight teams in Ontario over this time, only twice (2006 and 2009) not making the semi-finals (final four teams). In the 2010-2011 season, the Peach Kings won their fourth Provincial title, defeating the Belle River Canadiens in the semi-finals and the defending Ontario Champion Alliston Hornets in the Provincial Finals.

The playoffs for the 2019–20 season were cancelled due to the COVID-19 pandemic, leading to the team not being able to play a single game.

== Season-by-season results ==
Season	GP	W	L	T	OTL	GF	GA	P	Results	Playoffs
1959-60	24	4	19	1	-	89	193	9	6th NDJBHL	
1960-68	Statistics not available									
1968-69	19	12	6	1	-	--	--	25	3rd IJCHL	Lost semi-final
1969-70	30	20	8	2	-	200	148	42	1st IJCHL	Won League, lost CSC QF
1970-71	36	18	16	2	-	211	182	38	3rd GHJHL	
1971-72	Statistics not available									
1975-76	40	10	25	5	-	201	257	25	6th GHJHL	
1976-77	32	8	18	6	-	173	220	22	4th GHJHL	
1977-78	40	23	12	5	-	273	209	51	3rd GHJHL	
1978-79	42	21	18	3	-	254	220	45	4th GHJHL	
1979-80	44	17	22	5	-	267	274	39	6th GHJHL	
1980-81	42	14	25	3	-	218	263	31	6th GHJHL	
1981-82	35	10	21	4	-	-	-	24	6th GHJHL	Lost final
1982-83	42	11	30	1	-	223	295	23	8th GHJHL	
1983-84	42	12	23	7	-	193	261	31	5th GHJHL	
1984-85	42	17	19	6	-	252	280	40	5th GHJHL	
1985-86	40	12	26	2	-	160	232	26	10th GHJHL	
1986-87	42	14	25	3	-	206	238	31	7th GHJHL	
1987-88	42	12	24	6	-	209	272	30	6th GHJHL	
1988-89	42	10	28	4	-	154	234	24	7th GHJHL	
1989-90	48	5	42	0	1	183	363	11	9th GHJHL	
1990-91	36	11	19	6	-	166	218	28	5th NJC-E	
1991-92	36	23	8	5	-	228	135	51	1st NJC-E	
1992-93	42	24	16	2	-	239	175	50	4th NJC-E	
1993-94	42	10	28	4	-	165	227	24	7th NJC-E	
1994-95	36	1	34	1	-	95	284	3	7th NJC-E	
1995-96	36	11	20	5	-	130	189	27	5th NJC-E	
1996-97	36	10	23	2	1	159	239	23	5th NJC-E	
1997-98	42	12	27	3	0	149	272	27	6th NJC-E	
1998-99	35	16	17	1	1	145	141	34	4th NJC-E	
1999-00	36	27	6	-	3	164	114	57	2nd NJC-E	Lost preliminary round 3-4 (Blues)
2000-01	36	20	11	4	1	154	114	45	3rd NJC-E	Won division quarter-final 4-3 (Corvairs); Won division semi-final 4-1 (Blues); Lost division final 3-4 (Riverhawks)
2001-02	36	24	9	3	0	161	110	51	2nd NJC-E	Won division semi-final 4-3 (Blues); Lost division final 2-4 (Riverhawks)
2002-03	36	30	2	3	1	176	95	64	1st NJCHL	Won division semi-final 4-0 (Terriers); Won division final 4-2 (Blues); Won League 4-0 (Merchants; Won CSC semi-final 4-2 (73's); Won CSC final 4-0 (Ice)
2003-04	36	28	5	2	1	216	77	59	1st NJCHL	Won division semi-final 4-0 (Rangers); Won division final 4-1 (Blues); Won League 4-0 (Storm); Won CSC semi-final 4-1 (Chiefs); Won CSC final 4-0 (Ironmen)
2004-05	36	28	5	3	0	202	83	59	1st NJCHL	Won division semi-final 4-0 (Rangers); Won division final 4-0 (Blues); Won League 4-1 (Storm); Won CSC semi-final 4-1 (Bruins); Lost CSC final 3-4 (73's)
2005-06	36	33	3	0	0	194	82	66	1st NJCHL	Won quarter-final 4-1 (Riverhawks); Won semi-final 4-0 (Blues); Lost final 1-4 (Storm)
2006-07	36	28	7	0	1	207	103	57	1st NJCHL	Won semi-final 4-1 (Blues); Won League 4-2 (Merchants); Lost CSC semi-final 0-4 (73's)
2007-08	36	32	2	2	0	213	62	66	1st NJCHL	Won quarter-final 4-1 (Riverhawks); Won semi-final 4-0 (Rangers); Won League 4-2 (Merchants); Lost CSC semi-final 1-4 (73's)
2008-09	36	26	8	-	2	150	78	54	1st NJCHL	Won division semi-final 4-0 (Riverhawks); Won division final 4-2 (Blues); Lost final 1-4 (Merchants)
2009-10	36	27	9	-	0	135	92	54	3rd NJCHL	Won division semi-final 4-0 (Rangers); Won division final 4-2 (Blues); Won League 4-2 (Merchants); Lost CSC semi-final 1-4 (Canadiens)
2010-11	36	27	7	-	2	182	99	56	2nd NJCHL	Won division semi-final 4-2 (Corvairs); Won division final 4-1 (Rangers); Won League 4-3 (Merchants); Won CSC semi-final 4-1 (Canadiens); Won CSC final 4-1 (Hornets)
2011-12	36	32	4	-	0	171	73	54	1st NJCHL	Won division semi-final 4-0 (Riverhawks; Won division final 4-1 (Rangers; Won League 4-0 (Firebirds); Won CSC semi-final 4-1 (73's); Won CSC final 4-1 (Hornets)
2012-13	38	26	9	-	3	173	90	55	2nd NJC-E	Won division semi-final 4-2 (Mudcats); Won division final 4-2 (Rangers); Won League 4-2 (Firebirds); Lost CSC semi-final 1-4 (73's)
2013-14	35	26	8	-	1	140	77	53	1st NJCHL	Won quarter-final 4-0 (Sailors); Won semi-final 4-1 (Blues); Won final 4-0 (Mudcats); Won CSC quarter-final 4-0 (Mounties); Lost CSC semi-final 0-4 (Chiefs)
2014-15	42	31	7	-	4	162	99	66	1st NJCHL	Won quarters, 4-0 (Storm); Won semi-final 4-1 (Hawks); Won League finals 4-1 (Blues); Lost CSC quarter-finals 2-4 (Ayr)
2015-16	42	29	10	2	1	181	111	61	2nd of 8 NJCHL	Won quarter-final 4-2 (Sailors); Won semi-final 4-3 (Blues); Won League final 4-3 (Rangers); Lost CSC quarter-final, 1-4 (Ayr)
2016-17	42	36	5	1	-	201	91	73	1st of 8-PJHL; Bloomfield Div	Won quarter-final 4-0 (Storm); Won semi-final 4-0 (Jr. Mudcats); Won League 4-2 (Rangers); Lost Conference final 0-4 (Ayr)
2017-18	42	37	3	0	2	256	89	76	2nd of 8-PJHL; Bloomfield Div	Won quarter-final 4-0 (Jr. Mudcats); Won semi-final 4-0 (Sailors); Lost final 3-4 (Rangers)
2018-19	42	36	4	1	1	194	72	74	1st of 8-PJHL; Bloomfield Div	Won quarter-final 4-1 (Jr. Mudcats); Won semi-final 4-0 (Hawks); Won League, 4-2 (Rangers); Won South Conference final, 4-2 (Applejacks); Won CSC semi-final 4-2 (Hawks); Lost CSC final 1-4 (Raiders)
2019-20	42	31	8	0	3	138	80	65	1st of 8-PJHL; Bloomfield Div	Won quarter-final 4-0 (Jr. Mudcats); Won semi-finals 4-0 (Shamrocks) incomplete, 1-1 (Rangers); Playoffs cancelled due to COVID
2020-21	Season lost due to COVID-19 pandemic									
2021-22	30	19	7	3	1	101	67	42	1st of 7-PJHL; Bloomfield Div	Won quarter-final 4-0 (Jr. Mudcats); Won semi-final 4-0 (Riverhawks); Won League, 4-2 (Rangers); Won Conference 4-2 (Firebirds); Advance to CSC Championships (see below)
2022-23	42	32	10	0	0	168	105	64	2nd of 7 -PJHL; Bloomfield Div	Won quarter-final 4-0 (Hawks); Won semi-final 4-1 (Sailors); Lost final 1-4 (Rangers)
2023-24	42	32	7	2	1	203	98	67	1st of 7 -PJHL; Bloomfield Div	Div quarter-final bye Won semi-final 4-0 (Riverhawks); Won division 4-1 (Blues); Lost South Conference final 1-4 (Firebirds)
2024-25	42	31	10	1	0	196	106	63	2nd of 8 Bloomfield Div; 4th of 16 South Conf. 14th of 63 PJHL	Won quarter-final 4-0 (Mudcats); Won semi-final 4-2 (Riverhawks); Won division 4-0 (Blues); Lost South Conference final 3-4 (Firebirds)
2025-26	42	31	9	2	0	198	115	64	2nd of 8 Bloomfield Div; 2nd of 16 South Conf. 9th of 61 PJHL	Won quarter-final 4-3 (Sailors); Lost semi-final 1-4 (Riverhawks)

== Clarence Schmalz Cup appearances ==
1940: Grimsby Peach Kings defeated Markham Millionaires 3-2.
2003: Grimsby Peach Kings defeated Georgina Ice 4-0.
2004: Grimsby Peach Kings defeated Wingham Ironmen 4-0.
2005: Essex 73's defeated Grimsby Peach Kings 4-3.
2011: Grimsby Peach Kings defeated Alliston Hornets 4-1.
2012: Grimsby Peach Kings defeated Alliston Hornets 4-1.
2019: Napanee Raiders defeated Grimsby Peach Kings 4-1.

== Championship playoffs 2022 ==
Clarence Schmalz Cup Championships

Year	Round robin	Record	Standing	Semifinal	Gold medal game
2022	L, Lakeshore Canadiens 2-3; OTL, Clarington Eagles 1-2; OTL, Stayner Siskins 2-3	0-1-0-2	4th of 4	L, Lakeshore Canadiens 0-5	n/a

== Notable alumni ==
- Paul Beraldo
- Bill Berg
- Bill Carson
- Gerry Carson
- George Horne
- Steve Mason
- Jack McVicar
- John Scott
- Dennis Ververgaert
