= Dorchester High School =

Dorchester High School may refer to:

- Dorchester High School (Massachusetts) (1852–2003) in the Dorchester neighborhood of Boston, Massachusetts, United States
- Dorchester High School for Girls (1925–1953) in the Dorchester neighborhood of Boston, Massachusetts, United States
- Dorchester High School (Nebraska) in Dorchester, Nebraska, United States
- Lord Dorchester Secondary School in Dorchester, Ontario, Canada

== See also ==
- Dorchester (disambiguation)
