= Lord of Dorchester =

Lord of Dorchester or Lord Dorchester may refer to:

== Titles ==
- Lord Sheriff of Dorchester, a.k.a. Lord High Sheriff of Dorset
- Lord Lieutenant of Dorchester, a.k.a. Lord Lieutenant of Dorsetshire
- Baron Dorchester
- Baroness Dorchester
- Viscount Dorchester
- Countess of Dorchester
- Earl of Dorchester
- Marquess of Dorchester

== Organizations ==
- Lord Dorchester Secondary School, Dorchester, Ontario, Canada

== See also ==
- The Duke of Dorchester, professional wrestler
- Dorchester (disambiguation)
