= Dorchester =

Dorchester may refer to:

== Geography ==
=== England ===
- Dorchester, Dorset, the county town of Dorset
  - Dorchester (UK Parliament constituency), a former parliamentary constituency in Dorset
  - HM Prison Dorchester, a men's prison located in Dorchester in Dorset, England closed in December 2013
- Dorchester on Thames, Oxfordshire, a village
- The Dorchester, a luxury hotel in London

=== Canada ===
- Dorchester, New Brunswick, shire town of Westmorland County
  - Dorchester Penitentiary, a medium-security federal prison in New Brunswick
  - Dorchester Parish, New Brunswick
- Dorchester, Ontario, a rural community in Middlesex County
- Saint-Prosper-de-Dorchester, a municipality in Quebec
  - Dorchester (federal electoral district), a former federal electoral district
  - Dorchester (provincial electoral district), a former provincial electoral district
  - Dorchester (Province of Canada electoral district), a former electoral district
  - Dorchester Boulevard, former name of part of René Lévesque Boulevard in Montreal, Quebec

=== United States ===
- Dorchester, Illinois
- Dorchester, Iowa
- Dorchester, Boston, Massachusetts
  - Dorchester Avenue (Boston)
  - Dorchester Pottery Works, an historic site in Massachusetts
- Dorchester, Nebraska
- Dorchester, New Hampshire
- Dorchester, New Jersey
- Dorchester, South Carolina
- Dorchester, Texas
- Dorchester, Wise County, Virginia
- Dorchester, Wisconsin
- Dorchester County, Maryland
- Dorchester County, South Carolina
- Dorchester Township, Macoupin County, Illinois

== Military ==
- USS Dorchester, the name of several United States Navy ships
- SS Dorchester, a War Shipping Administration troop transport ship torpedoed February 3, 1943, noted for four Army Chaplains that gave up their life vests to save others
- A fictional 'HMS Dorchester featured in the Norman Wisdom film The Bulldog Breed
- "Dorchester", a nickname for the AEC armoured command vehicle
- Dorchester armour, a variant of Chobham armour used on modern battle tanks

== People ==
- Troy Dorchester (born 1970) Canadian chuckwagon racer

=== Alternate name ===
- The Duke of Dorchester a.k.a. Pete Doherty (born 1945), professional wrestler
- Guy Carleton, 1st Baron Dorchester, a military commander in the Seven Years' War and American Revolutionary War, later Commander-in-Chief, North America, Governor of Quebec, and Governor General of Canada
- Dudley Carleton, 1st Viscount Dorchester (1573–1632), English diplomat

=== Titles ===
- Marquess of Dorchester
- Countess of Dorchester
- Earl of Dorchester
- Viscount Dorchester
- Baron Dorchester

== Religion ==
- Historic bishops of Dorchester:
  - For the bishops in Wessex, see Bishop of Winchester
  - For the bishops in Mercia, see Bishop of Lincoln
- Bishop of Dorchester, modern episcopal title
- Dorchester Abbey, in Dorchester, Oxfordshire
- Dorchester Friary, in Dorset, England

== Other ==
- 3858 Dorchester, an asteroid
- Dorchester Publishing, a book publisher in the United States
- Dorchester Town F.C., an association football club from Dorchester, Dorset
- Dennis Dorchester, a motorcoach autobus made by Dennis
