= Philip Favel =

Canadian veteran and Indigenous activist (1922–2021)

Philip Favel (1922–2021) was a Canadian veteran and Indigenous activist.

Favel was born on 30 April 1922 in Sweetgrass First Nation. He enlisted in the Royal Canadian Army Service Corps in 1942 and participated in Operation Overlord. For his military service he was awarded the Defence Medal, the Canadian Volunteer Service Medal, the Diamond Jubilee Medal, and the French National Order of the Legion of Honor.

After the war Favel advocated fair compensation for Indigenous veterans, who received discriminatory treatment compared to their non-Indigenous counterparts. He was named Grand Chief of the Saskatchewan First Nations Veterans Association. In 2020 a portrait of Favel by Elaine Goble, titled Normandy Warrior, was unveiled at the Canadian War Museum.
