= Carleton's Prize =

Rock island in Vermont, US

- Carleton's Prize
- Interactive map of Carleton's Prize

Geography
- Location: Lake Champlain, Vermont
- Coordinates: 44°36′16.5″N 73°20′47.5″W
- Highest elevation: 30 ft (9 m)

Administration
- United States

Carleton's Prize is a small rock island in the Vermont waters of Lake Champlain, in Crescent Bay off the southwestern tip of South Hero.

Rising 30 feet (9.1 m) from water's edge to a plateau, situated between Stave and Providence Islands, it has been called Carleton's Prize since the American Revolutionary War when Sir Guy Carleton brought it to notoriety in 1776, the morning after the Battle of Valcour Island.

Local lore has it that it was very foggy on the lake as Benedict Arnold escaped from behind Valcour Island with what was left of his small fleet. Not believing the Americans could have slipped by in the dark (which they had), the British searched to the north and east. In the heavy fog they sighted what they thought was a ship and summarily pounded it with their cannons, smoke from the black powder adding to the lack of visibility.

After up to an hour without return fire, either a breeze came up or the fog burned off, and the British realized they had not been firing on a ship. This distraction allowed Arnold to escape down the lake to Addison, Vermont, where he burned his remaining fleet to prevent capture. Local lore goes further to say that local Islanders had hoisted logs on the island to look like masts. Rust marks from fired cannon shot are still visible on the rock.

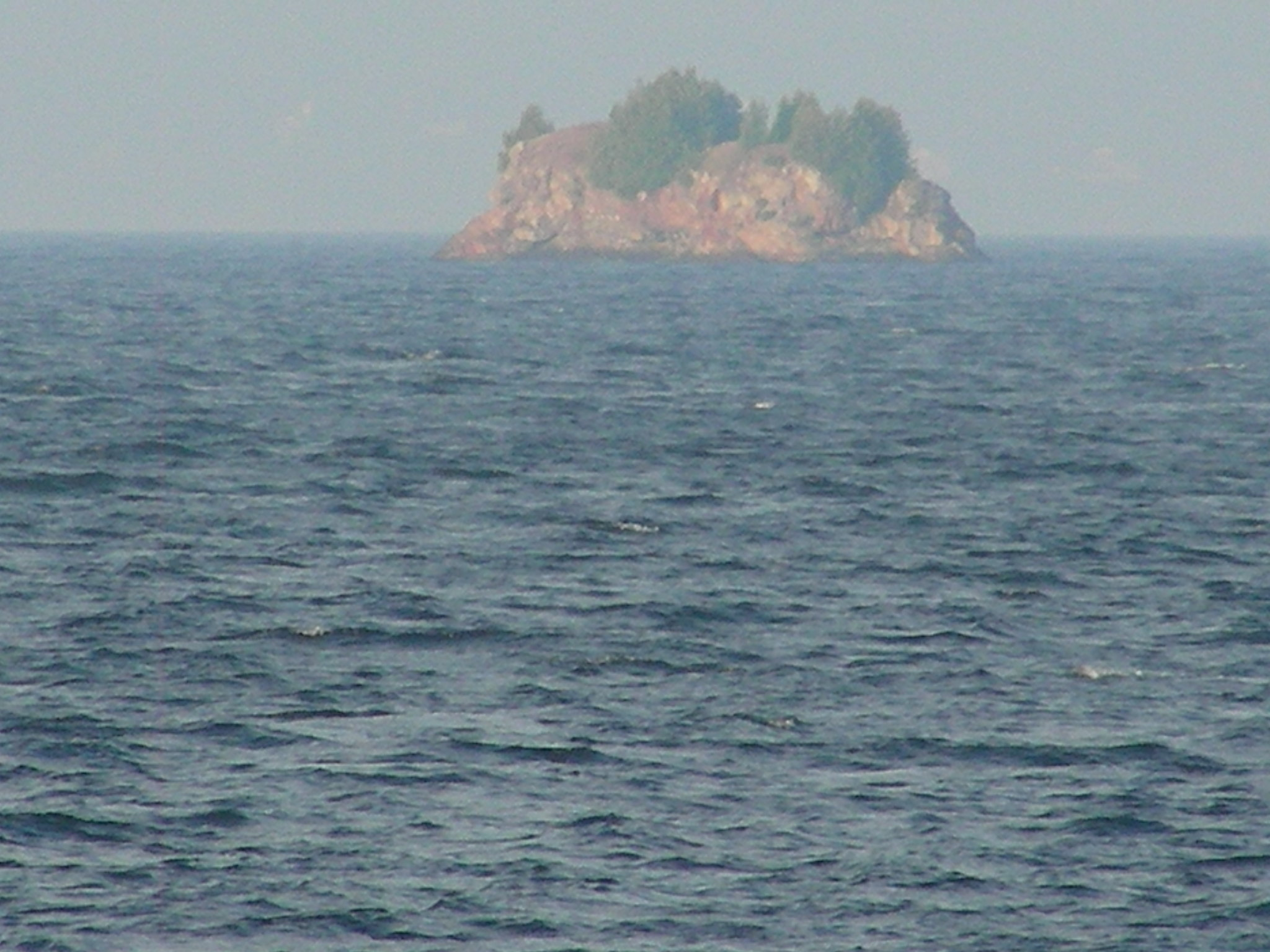
Carleton's Prize
