= Boone Jenner =

Canadian ice hockey player (born 1993)

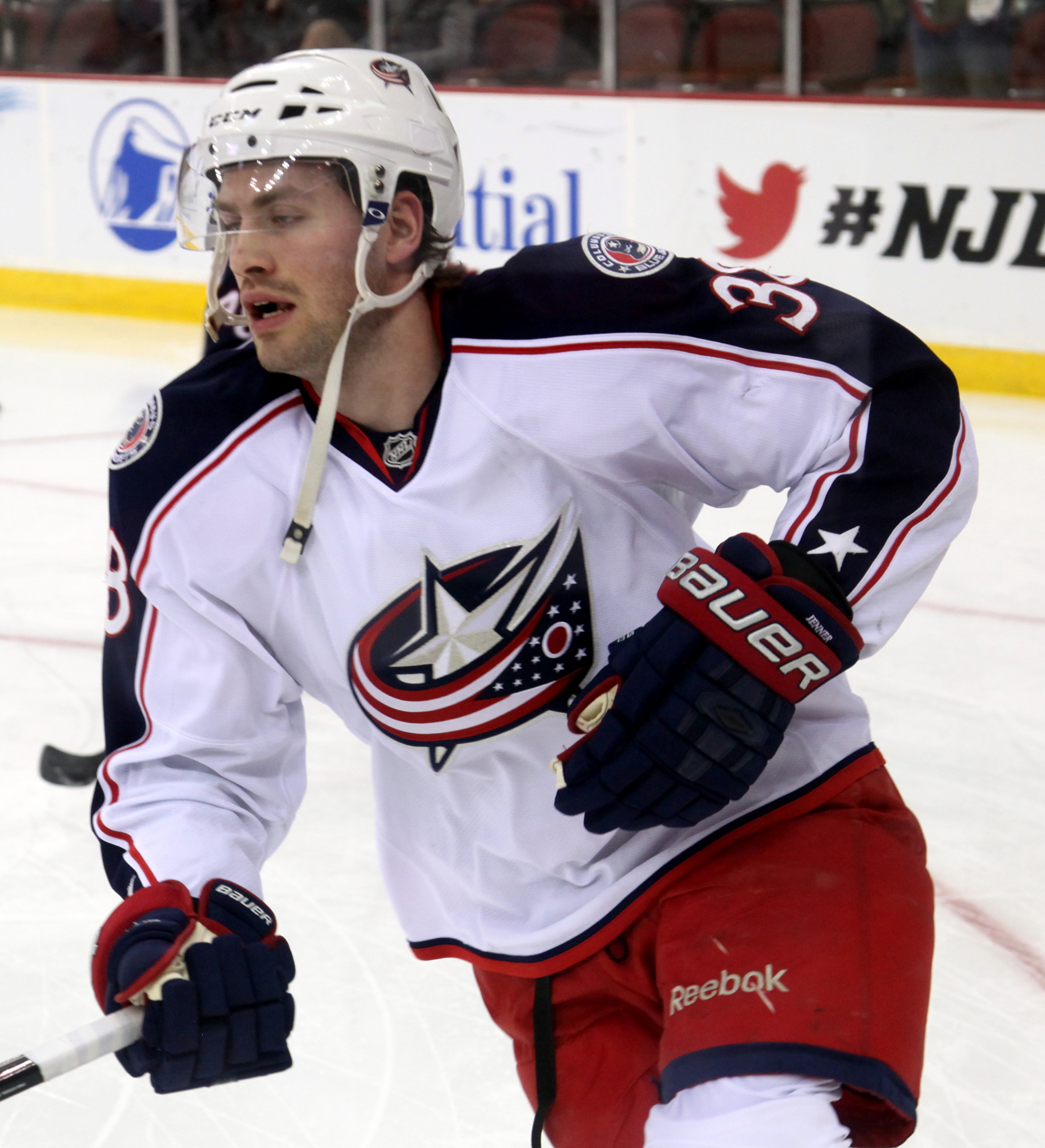
- Jenner with the Columbus Blue Jackets in 2014
- Born: June 15, 1993 (age 33) Dorchester, Ontario, Canada
- Height: 6 ft 2 in (188 cm)
- Weight: 206 lb (93 kg; 14 st 10 lb)
- Position: Centre
- Shoots: Left
- NHL team Former teams: Washington Capitals; Columbus Blue Jackets
- NHL draft: 37th overall, 2011; Columbus Blue Jackets
- Playing career: 2012–present

Boone Robbie Jenner (born June 15, 1993) is a Canadian professional ice hockey player who is a centre for the Washington Capitals of the National Hockey League (NHL).

As a teenager, Jenner played four seasons of major junior hockey with the Oshawa Generals of the Ontario Hockey League, where he scored 111 goals and 135 assists for 246 points, while earning 265 penalty minutes, in 227 games played. His play with the Generals resulted in Jenner being selected by Columbus in the second round, 37th overall, of the 2011 NHL entry draft.

Jenner has represented Canada on the international stage at both the junior and senior levels. He first represented Team Canada at the 2010 World U-17 Hockey Challenge, where he won a silver medal. In his next tournament, Jenner helped clinch a bronze medal for Canada at the 2012 World Junior Ice Hockey Championships. After failing to medal at the 2013 World Junior Ice Hockey Championships, Jenner won a gold medal while representing Team Canada at the 2016 IIHF World Championship.

== Early life ==
Jenner was born on June 15, 1993, in Dorchester, Ontario, to parents Matt and Terri Jenner and was the youngest of three boys. While his first name came after his father heard it on the radio, his middle name Robbie is from his paternal grandfather. Jenner grew up playing hockey and lacrosse in Mossley, Ontario, a small town just outside of London. The first organized hockey team he played with was his local Dorchester Tyke Firefighters. He played minor hockey with the Elgin Middlesex Chiefs AAA squad in the Minor Hockey Alliance of Ontario League before being drafted into the Ontario Hockey League (OHL). In his final season with the Elgin Middlesex Chiefs, Jenner was named captain of the team and competed at the 2009 OHL Cup Showcase Tournament. While the Chiefs failed to win the tournament, Jenner ranked second amongst all players in scoring with six goals and five assists in seven games.

== Playing career ==
=== Amateur ===
Upon concluding the 2008–09 season with the Chiefs, Jenner was drafted fourth overall by the Oshawa Generals in the 2009 OHL Entry Draft. As a 16-year-old rookie, he made his OHL debut on September 18, 2009, where he scored a goal and an assist against the Sarnia Sting. In December 2009, Jenner was named the OHL's Rookie of the Month after he led all rookies in scoring during the month with three goals and seven assists over nine games. He was also named captain of Team Ontario and led them to a silver medal at the 2010 World U-17 Hockey Challenge. Although he only scored once in the final 10 games of the season, Jenner finished with 19 goals and 30 assists for 49 points. As a result, Jenner was a runner–up for the Emms Family Award as the OHL's Rookie of the Year and earned a selection on the OHL’s first All-Rookie team. Over the summer, he also helped lead Team Canada to a gold medal at the 2010 Ivan Hlinka Memorial Tournament.

Jenner returned to the Generals for his sophomore season, during which he set career-highs in goals, assists, and points. After participating in a brawl on opening night, Jenner sat out the General's second and third games of the season against the Ottawa 67’s and Kingston Frontenacs. After coming back to the lineup, he faced difficulties in recapturing his scoring form, and only tallied 12 points through his first 20 games of the season. He also experienced an 11-game scoring drought starting on October 17 which was broken on November 16. Although he struggled at the start of the season, Jenner was still expected to be a top pick in the 2011 NHL entry draft and was selected to represent Team Orr at the annual CHL/NHL Top Prospects Game. He finished the regular season setting career-highs with 25 goals and 41 assists through 63 regular-season games. His efforts helped the Generals qualify for the 2011 OHL playoffs, where he tallied seven goals and five assists through 10 games. Jenner's final ranking from the NHL Central Scouting Bureau was 18th amongst eligible North American skaters. He was eventually drafted in the second round, 37th overall, by the Columbus Blue Jackets.

Following the draft, Jenner participated in Team Canada’s National Junior Development Camp and the Blue Jackets training camp before he returned to the Generals for the 2011–12 season. Upon returning to the Generals, Jenner was appointed team captain. The team struggled at the start, maintaining a 13–18–1–3 record through the first 35 games of the season. Due to their struggles, former Blue Jackets assistant coach Gary Agnew took over as head coach for the Generals in early November. Through 27 games, Jenner led the team with 15 goals and 18 assists and was named to Team Canada's national junior team to compete at the 2012 World Junior Ice Hockey Championships. While Jenner did not play in Canada's bronze medal game due to a suspension for elbowing, his overall efforts helped Canada clinch a bronze medal at the tournament. Following the win, Jenner returned to the Generals for the remainder of the regular season. On January 28, during a game against the Brampton Battalion, Jenner suffered a concussion due to a hit and missed 12 games to recover. While he recovered, the team maintained a 6–5–1 record. Once he rejoined the team, the Blue Jackets signed Jenner to a three-year, entry-level contract on March 28, 2012. Over the final eight games of the season, Jenner tallied four goals and four assists for eight points to secure the Generals a spot in the 2012 OHL playoffs. When the Generals faced the Niagara Ice Dogs in the OHL playoffs, Jenner scored a hat-trick and added two assists for a five-point Game 3 to cut the Ice Dogs' series lead 2–1. Jenner added another goal and assist the following night to help the Generals tie the series, although they were eventually eliminated in Game 6. Once they were eliminated, Jenner joined the Blue Jackets American Hockey League affiliate, the Springfield Falcons, for the 2012 Calder Cup playoffs. He was placed on their fourth line between Ryan Garlock and Tom Spencer.

As a result of the 2012–13 NHL lockout, Jenner returned to the Generals for his fourth season and was renamed captain. He started the season strong and led the league with seven goals and 12 points over five games. By December, Jenner had improved to 27 goals over 32 games and was selected to represent Team Canada at the 2013 World Junior Ice Hockey Championships. As a result of a late hit to Swedish defenseman Jesper Pettersson during an exhibition game, Jenner was suspended from the first three games of the tournament. Upon returning from the tournament, Jenner was invited to participate in the Blue Jackets abbreviated training camp in January but was one of the final cuts prior to the season beginning. In his first game back with the Generals following training camp, Jenner tallied two goals and two assists for four points in a 6–1 win over the Kingston Frontenacs. By the end of February, Jenner led his team with 36 goals and 73 points. Jenner finished his major junior career with 111 goals and 135 assists for 246 points, 263 penalty minutes and a cumulative +22 plus/minus rating in 227 career OHL games. Once the Generals were eliminated from the 2013 J. Ross Robertson Cup Playoffs, Jenner was reassigned to the Springfield Falcons. While playing with the Falcons, Jenner scored the overtime game-winning goal of Game 4 of the Eastern Conference semifinal against Syracuse. In eight playoff games with the Falcons, Jenner registered five points.

=== Professional ===
==== Early years (2012–2016) ====
During the offseason, Jenner worked alongside Blue Jackets strength coach Kevin Collins, going through intense workouts geared toward preparing him for the NHL level. In September, Jenner was again invited to the Blue Jackets training camp where he earned praise from coach Todd Richards. Once the season began, Jenner was placed on a line alongside Marian Gaborik and Brandon Dubinsky who helped him score his first and second NHL goals on October 17, 2013, against the Montreal Canadiens. His rookie season ended after he suffered a leg injury on October 25 during a game against the Toronto Maple Leafs. Jenner eventually returned to the Blue Jackets lineup on November 17, where he recorded five shot attempts and six hits during a 4–1 win over the Ottawa Senators. By January, Jenner was playing alongside Artem Anisimov and Nathan Horton while leading the team in hits with 51. He also helped the team set a new franchise record with eight consecutive wins.

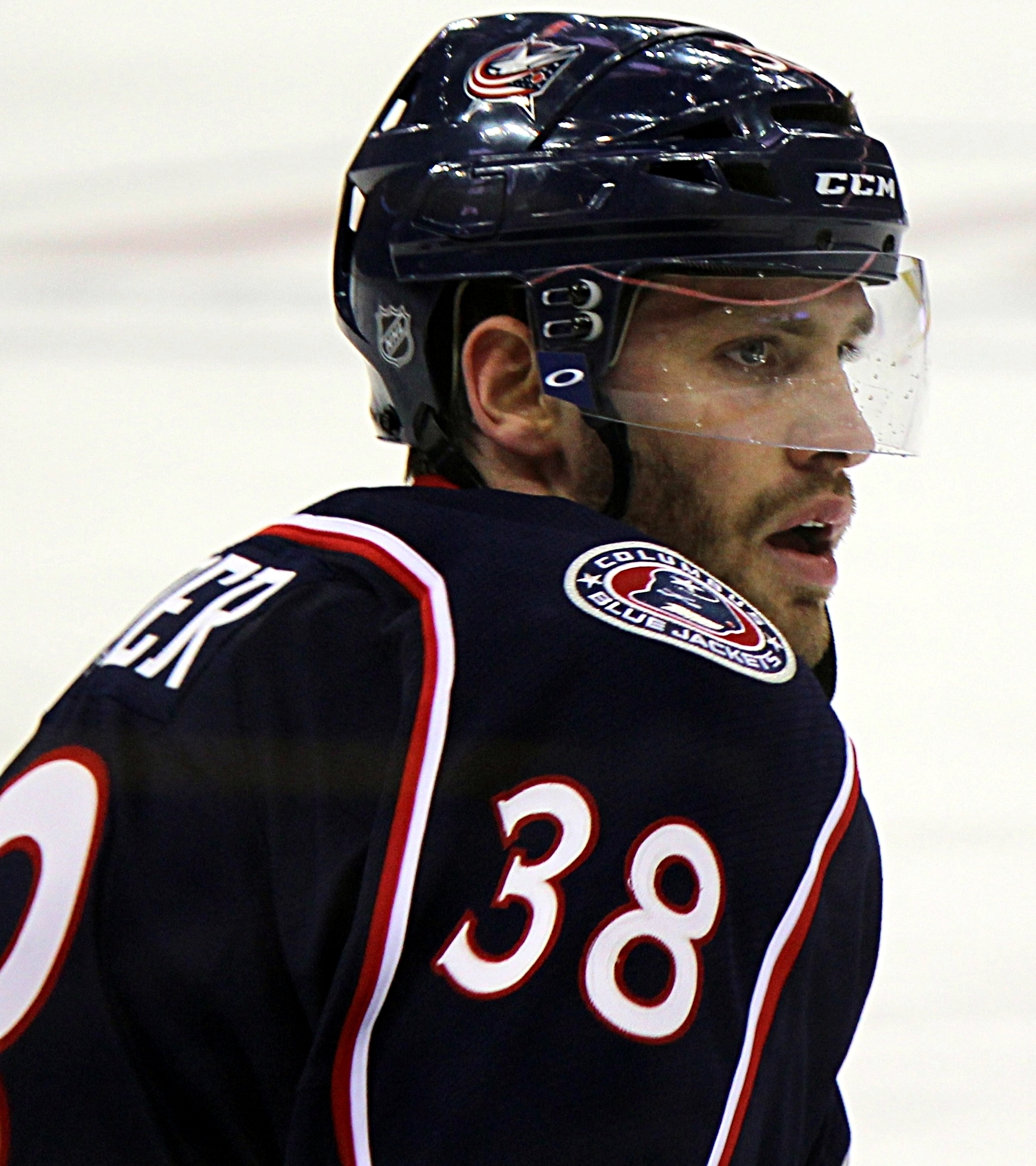
Jenner during a game against the Pittsburgh Penguins in December 2014

As the Blue Jackets approached the post-season, Jenner ranked second among league rookies in hits, third overall in game-winning goals, and fifth overall in shooting percentage. He earned praise from his teammates for his play, with Ryan Johansen saying: "Honestly, every time we dump the puck in, he's the first one in on the forecheck trying to kill someone." Upon qualifying for the 2014 Stanley Cup playoffs, Jenner and fellow rookie Jack Johnson scored their first playoff goals in the first three minutes of Game 3. His second goal of the series came during Game 4 to help the Blue Jackets win the game 4–3. The Blue Jackets eventually fell to the Penguins and were eliminated from playoff contention.

Following his successful rookie season, Jenner only played 31 games during the 2014–15 NHL season due to various injuries. At the start of the season, Jenner was expected to miss five weeks following surgery on his broken hand. Upon recovering, Jenner went without a goal in his first eight games before breaking that streak with six goals over the next 12 games. On December 20, Jenner was placed on the Blue Jackets injured reserve list after he was diagnosed with a stress fracture of his back. He returned to regular team practice in March and returned to the lineup in a 3–2 win over the Calgary Flames on March 21. Upon returning, the Blue Jackets earned a point in their final 10 games of the season and Jenner finished with nine goals and eight assists through 31 games. He also ranked sixth in the league with 102 hits, behind Ryan Reaves with 276.

Upon entering his third year with the Blue Jackets, Jenner was named an alternate captain alongside Brandon Dubinsky and captain Nick Foligno. As the season progressed, Jenner set career highs in goals, assists, and points through 63 games and ranked second on the club in goals, power-play goals, game-winning goals, shots, and hits. As a result, the Jackets signed him to a two-year contract extension on February 29, 2016. He continued to produce on offense and became the fifth player in franchise history to have a 30-goal campaign.

==== Finding post-season success, captaincy (2016–2026) ====
In the first year of his two-year contract, Jenner slowed down in scoring through the 2016–17 season while the team improved overall. He began the season with two goals over the team's first 22 games, with his first of the season coming on November 9, 2016. While playing alongside Cam Atkinson, Jenner scored three goals in the team's first 22 games and ranked second on the club in hits. Although Jenner was struggling, the team began a winning streak of 16 consecutive games, including a perfect 14–0 record in December. When it ended on January 5, 2017, with a loss to the Washington Capitals, the team was one short of the NHL record of 17 games. When the streak ended, Jenner and his second-line linemates Cam Atkinson and Brandon Dubinsky continued to produce for the Blue Jackets. While Dubinsky described their line as primarily defensive focused, by the middle of February, the trio had improved to 17 goals, 16 assists and a plus-20 rating. From January 1 until the end of the regular season, Jenner ranked third on the team in goals scored. He finished the regular season with 18 goals and 16 assists while linemate Atkinson led the Jackets in points and goals. In June, Jenner was one of 11 players the Blue Jackets protected ahead of the 2017 NHL Expansion Draft.

After his poor season, Jenner suffered an injury during summer training which caused him to miss all of training camp, preseason, and the first seven games of the 2017–18 season. Upon returning to the lineup, Jenner scored in back-to-back games against Boston and Florida but remained pointless for 11 consecutive games. Following an injury to Dubinsky in December, Jenner was moved from left wing to the centre position with Matt Calvert and Nick Foligno as his wingers. At the time of the move, Jenner had accumulated three goals, six assists, and a minus-2 rating. Despite the move, Jenner still struggled to score consistently, until the Blue Jackets acquired Thomas Vanek after the NHL Trade Deadline. On March 1, John Tortorella put Jenner on a line with Alexander Wennberg and Vanek and the trio began producing at a rapid pace. Over the trio's 17 games together, Jenner accumulated seven goals and six assists for 13 points to finish the regular season with a total of 32 points. As the Blue Jackets qualified for the 2018 Stanley Cup playoffs, Jenner's line remained together until an injury to Wennberg forced them to add Foligno at centre. They struggled as a line and were slow to produce points over the first few games of their series against the Washington Capitals. Jenner finished the postseason with one goal and two assists over six postseason games. As a restricted free agent, Jenner signed a four-year, $15 million contract, with an average annual value of $3.75 million, on July 5, 2018, to remain with the Blue Jackets.

Following the signing of his contract, Jenner changed his offseason training regimen. He began skating again in June, which was earlier than the previous years, and focused on his speed and agility. As Vanek left the Blue Jackets during the offseason to join the Red Wings organization, Jenner and Dubinsky were joined by Josh Anderson on the Blue Jackets top line. However, this line was shortlived as Dubinsky suffered an injury after the first two games of the 2018–19 season. As a result of this injury, Jenner was reunited with Foligno and the two alternated between centre and left wing while Anderson remained on the right. The trio immediately became a line that was considered to "embody the club’s identity." On January 31, 2019, Jenner was ruled out for one to three weeks to recover from an infected ankle laceration suffered after blocking a shot in a game against the Capitals on January 12. At the time of the injury, Jenner had tallied nine goals and 12 assists for 21 points through 48 games. He returned a few games later for the Jackets matchup against the Colorado Avalanche on February 5. Although he missed a few games, Jenner's line continued to improve offensively although the Blue Jackets struggled to find consistency. After missing one game due to a fever, Jenner returned to the Blue Jackets lineup on March 12, 2019, where he scored his first career NHL hat-trick against the Boston Bruins in a 7–4 win. The hat-trick also marked his 100th career NHL goal. Jenner finished the season with 16 goals and 22 assists for 38 points through 77 games as the Blue Jackets qualified for the 2019 Stanley Cup playoffs. In their matchup against the Tampa Bay Lightning, Jenner helped the Blue Jackets become the first team to sweep a Presidents' Trophy winner in the first round. While Jenner went without scoring a goal in the first round, he scored his first goal of the postseason in Game 3 of the Eastern Conference Second Round against the Boston Bruins. This would prove to be his only goal as he finished the postseason with one goal and two assists for three points over 10 games.

Although Jenner opened the 2019–20 season with Foligno and Anderson, an injury to Anderson in October led to a split up of the line. While Jenner and Foligno were originally paired with Emil Bemström, once Anderson returned the lines were once again rearranged. Jenner and Anderson were placed on the third line with Sonny Milano and the trio began picking up points. In his first four games with his new linemate, Jenner tallied four points, including his 200th career NHL point in a 3–2 overtime loss to the New York Islanders on October 19. After the Blue Jackets started the 2019–20 season with a 5–5–2 record, Tortorella reunited Jenner and Foligno with Anderson as the team's "identity line." When this pairing failed to improve the Blue Jackets record, Tortorella replaced Jenner's linemates with wingers Gustav Nyquist and Oliver Bjorkstrand. On November 25, Jenner recorded his 100th career NHL assist in a 1–0 win over the Ottawa Senators. The following month, Jenner tied a game against the Los Angeles Kings to help send them to an overtime win. This marked the 15th time in franchise history and first since 2016 that Columbus tied the score of a game in the final two minutes then went on to win the game. By late January, Jenner had recorded eight goals and nine assists for 17 points. Although the season was cut short due to the COVID-19 pandemic, Jenner was one of only three Blue Jackets players to play in all 70 regular season games. He finished with 11 goals and 13 assists for 24 points and was tied for fifth all-time in franchise goals with 113. Although his linemates often changed due to injuries in the lineup, Jenner consistently played at centre for the Blue Jackets' second or third line. In May 2020, Jenner was named the recipient of the Blue Jackets 2019-20 Community MVP Award in recognition of his efforts with the Nationwide Children's Hospital.

Jenner returned to the Blue Jackets in January for their shortened 2020–21 season with the expectation of returning to wing given the Jackets acquisition of Max Domi and Mikko Koivu. He began the season by tallying two goals and an assist in his first four games to move into sixth on the team's all-time points list. As the season progressed, Jenner was moved back to center after Domi struggled in the position and Koivu retired. On February 2, 2021, Jenner became the ninth player in franchise history to play all of his 500 career NHL games with the Blue Jackets. The following month, Jenner scored his 121st NHL goal to pass R. J. Umberger for fourth on the Blue Jackets all-time goals list. He finished the season with eight goals and nine assists for 17 points through 41 games. As a result, Jenner signed a four-year contract extension to remain with the Blue Jackets on July 28, 2021. After the Blue Jackets failed to qualify for the 2021 Stanley Cup playoffs due to a regular season 18–26–12 record, Tortorella was fired as head coach and replaced with Brad Larsen.

After trading Foligno in the 2020–21 season, Jenner was named the seventh captain in Blue Jackets' franchise history on October 12, 2021. He began the season centering the Blue Jackets top line between Patrik Laine and Jakub Voracek and playing on the top power-play unit. His five goals over eight games helped lead the Blue Jackets to a 5–3–0 start to the 2021–22 season. However, after Laine suffered an oblique strain in early November, the Blue Jackets struggled to find a permanent replacement for him on their power play unit. On December 19, Jenner was one of three Blue Jackets players placed under the league's COVID-19 protocols. At the time, Jenner had tallied 11 goals and seven assists for 18 points over the first 28 games of the season. Jenner spent 10 days in quarantine under the league's COVID-19 protocols before rejoining the team at the end of December. Once both Jenner and Laine returned to the Blue Jackets lineup, they both immediately picked up their scoring. By the end of January, Jenner led the team with 18 goals and 30 points while Laine had 10 goals and 21 points. Despite their production, the Blue Jackets maintained a losing 20–22–1 record for fifth place in the Metropolitan Division. It was later revealed, following a game on March 11 against the Minnesota Wild, that Jenner had been playing through a lower-back injury for part of the season. On March 13, 2022, Jenner was listed as week to week but subsequently missed the final 23 games of the season. At the time of the injury, Jenner led the Blue Jackets with 23 goals and 44 points and was tied with Bjorkstrand and Gustav Nyquist for fourth with 21 assists.

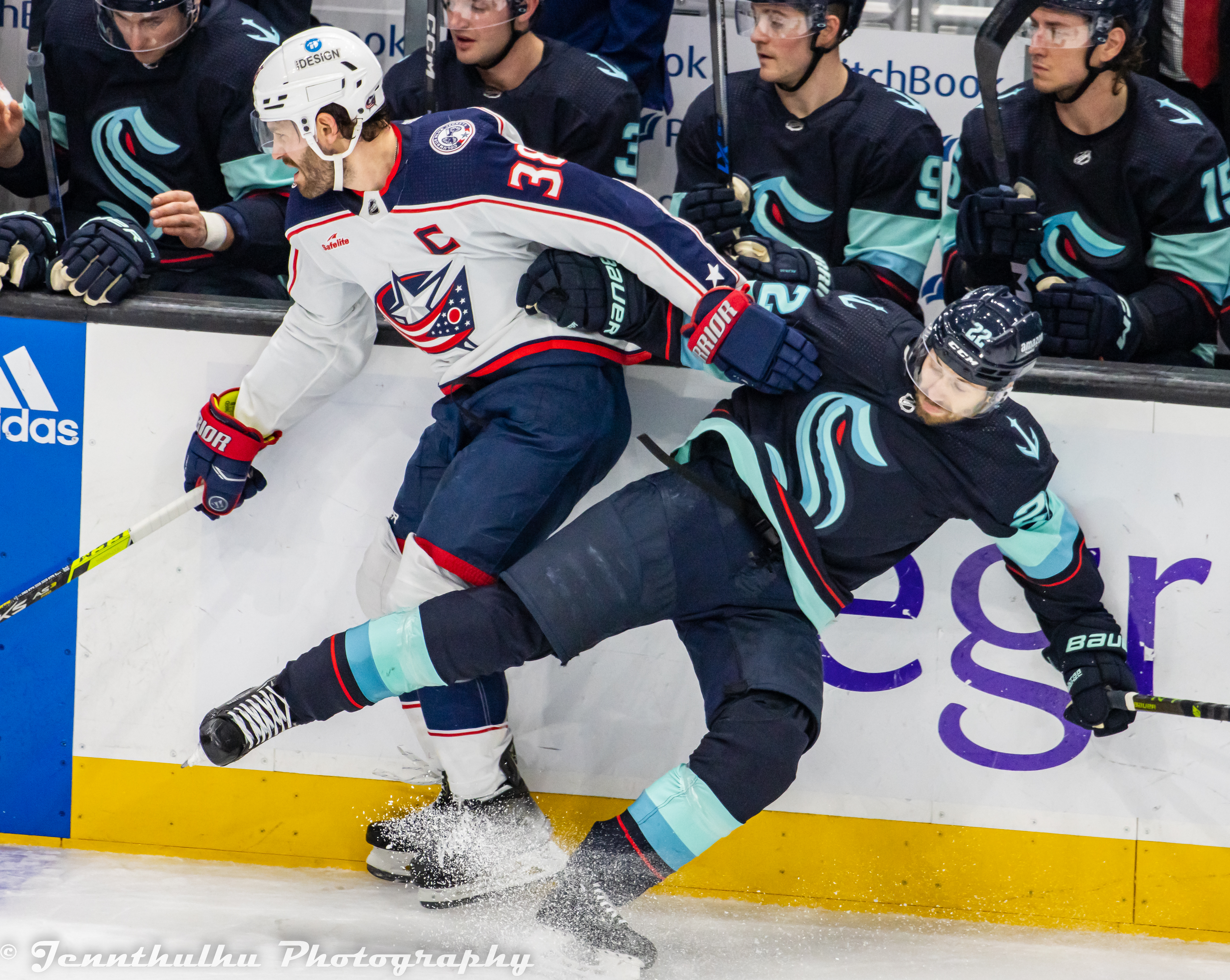
Jenner (left) battling with Oliver Bjorkstrand while playing with the Blue Jackets in 2023

Jenner returned to the Blue Jackets for the 2022–23 season after spending the offseason recovering from his back injury. He returned to the Blue Jackets' top line as a centerman between Laine and newly acquired winger Johnny Gaudreau. On December 3, 2022, Jenner tallied his 300th career NHL point with an assist on Laine's second-period goal against the Winnipeg Jets. This assist made him the fifth player in franchise history to record 300 or more points as a Blue Jackets player. On December 19, 2022, Jenner was placed on injured reserve and scheduled for surgery to repair a fractured thumb. He had suffered the injury the previous week against the Florida Panthers and played two games before being placed on injured reserve. Jenner missed 11 games after undergoing surgery but returned on January 15 to help the Blue Jackets snap a 10-game road losing streak. On January 29, 2023, Jenner played in his 628th game for the Blue Jackets, passing Cam Atkinson for the second most played in franchise history. In spite of his achievements during the season, the Blue Jackets finished last in the Eastern Conference and they fired Larsen as head coach.

During the 2023–24 offseason, reports emerged that new head coach Mike Babcock requested to see personal photos of Blue Jackets players on their cell phones. While Jenner and Babock wrote a joint statement refuting these claims, Babcock resigned from his position on September 17, and was replaced with Pascal Vincent. Under Vincent, Jenner began the 2023–24 season with his second career hat-trick against the New York Rangers on October 14, 2023. His success continued throughout the month and he started November as the Blue Jackets third all-time leading scorer with 174 goals. On November 18, Jenner skated in his 675th career game for the Blue Jackets, passing Rick Nash as the franchise's all-time leader in games played. When he suffered a broken jaw on December 8, Jenner led the team with 13 goals through 29 games and ranked 15th in the league. In spite of his injury, Jenner was the Blue Jackets sole selection for the 2024 NHL All-Star Game.

==== Move to Washington (2026–present) ====
On July 1, 2026, Jenner signed a four-year, $23 million contract with the Washington Capitals.

== Playing style ==
As a youth, Jenner was critiqued for his skating while praised for dominating in the faceoff circle. Prior to his rookie season with the Blue Jackets, Jeff Twohey, former GM of the Peterborough Petes, said: "He’s better, but even if he’s not ever going to be considered a great skater, he’ll figure out a way to succeed as a pro."

== Personal life ==
Jenner's uncle Billy Carroll is a four-time Stanley Cup winner, winning three times with the New York Islanders and once with the Edmonton Oilers. Jenner's oldest brother Leo played five seasons with the OHL's Plymouth Whalers and played hockey for Acadia University. His cousin Marcus Carroll, Billy Carroll's son, played five OHL seasons for the Owen Sound Attack and two seasons with the ECHL's Utah Grizzlies.

In December of 2023, Jenner and his wife Maggie announced that they were expecting their first child the following May. The child, named Dawson Jenner, was stillborn on March 31, 2024.

On September 21, 2025, the couple announced the birth of their second son, Tommy Pavol Jenner.

== Career statistics ==
=== Regular season and playoffs ===
			Regular season					Playoffs
Season	Team	League	GP	G	A	Pts	PIM	GP	G	A	Pts	PIM
2009–10	Oshawa Generals	OHL	65	19	30	49	91	—	—	—	—	—
2010–11	Oshawa Generals	OHL	63	25	41	66	57	10	7	5	12	14
2011–12	Oshawa Generals	OHL	43	22	27	49	59	6	4	7	11	10
2011–12	Springfield Falcons	AHL	5	1	0	1	2	—	—	—	—	—
2012–13	Oshawa Generals	OHL	56	45	37	82	58	9	2	6	8	8
2012–13	Springfield Falcons	AHL	5	3	1	4	0	8	2	3	5	8
2013–14	Columbus Blue Jackets	NHL	72	16	13	29	45	6	3	2	5	4
2014–15	Columbus Blue Jackets	NHL	31	9	8	17	12	—	—	—	—	—
2015–16	Columbus Blue Jackets	NHL	82	30	19	49	77	—	—	—	—	—
2016–17	Columbus Blue Jackets	NHL	82	18	15	33	52	5	2	1	3	14
2017–18	Columbus Blue Jackets	NHL	75	13	19	32	39	6	1	2	3	4
2018–19	Columbus Blue Jackets	NHL	77	16	22	38	42	10	1	2	3	2
2019–20	Columbus Blue Jackets	NHL	70	11	13	24	36	10	1	0	1	4
2020–21	Columbus Blue Jackets	NHL	41	8	9	17	6	—	—	—	—	—
2021–22	Columbus Blue Jackets	NHL	59	23	21	44	22	—	—	—	—	—
2022–23	Columbus Blue Jackets	NHL	68	26	19	45	51	—	—	—	—	—
2023–24	Columbus Blue Jackets	NHL	58	22	13	35	28	—	—	—	—	—
2024–25	Columbus Blue Jackets	NHL	26	7	12	19	4	—	—	—	—	—
2025–26	Columbus Blue Jackets	NHL	67	13	25	38	44	—	—	—	—	—
NHL totals			808	212	209	421	458	37	8	7	15	28

Medal record

Representing Canada

Ice hockey

World Junior Championships
Bronze medal – third place	2012 Canada	

IIHF World Championship
Gold medal – first place	2016 Russia	

=== International ===
Year	Team	Event	Result	GP	G	A	Pts	PIM
2010	Canada	U17	2nd place, silver medalist(s)	6	1	3	4	2
2010	Canada	U18	1st place, gold medalist(s)	5	2	1	3	0
2012	Canada	WJC	3rd place, bronze medalist(s)	5	0	2	2	29
2013	Canada	WJC	4th	3	0	0	0	2
2016	Canada	WC	1st place, gold medalist(s)	10	2	2	4	4
Junior totals				14	3	6	10	33
Senior totals				10	2	2	4	4

== Awards and honours ==
Award	Year	Ref.
NHL
NHL All-Star Game	2024	

Sporting positions
Preceded by Nick Foligno	Columbus Blue Jackets captain 2021–2026	Succeeded by TBD
