= Chris Robinson (baseball) =

Canadian baseball player (born 1984)

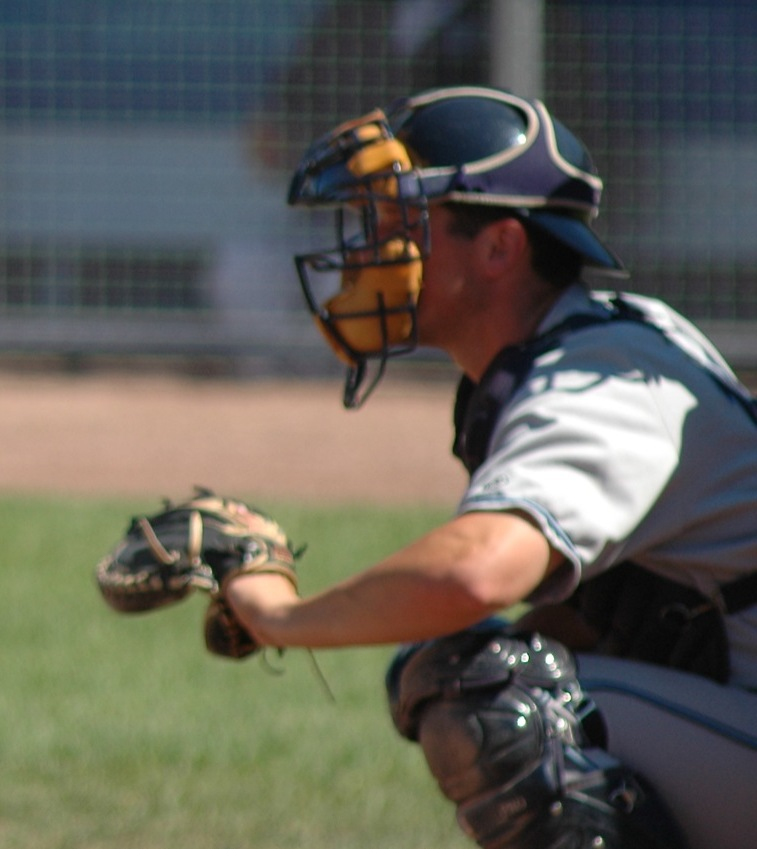
- Robinson with the West Michigan Whitecaps in 2005
- Catcher
- Born: May 12, 1984 (age 41); London, Ontario, Canada
- Batted: Right Threw: Right

MLB debut
- September 4, 2013, for the San Diego Padres

Last MLB appearance
- September 28, 2013, for the San Diego Padres

MLB statistics
- Batting average: .167
- Home runs: 1
- Runs batted in: 3
- Stats at Baseball Reference

Teams
- San Diego Padres (2013)
Medals
Men's baseball
Representing Canada
Baseball World Cup
Bronze medal – third place	2009 Nettuno	Team
Pan American Games
Gold medal – first place	2011 Guadalajara	Team
Gold medal – first place	2015 Toronto	Team

Christopher J. Robinson (born May 12, 1984) is a Canadian former Major League Baseball (MLB) catcher who played for the San Diego Padres in 2013, and who also played internationally for the Canada national baseball team in the 2009 Baseball World Cup, the 2011 Pan American Games, and the 2013 World Baseball Classic.

== Amateur career ==
Robinson attended Lord Dorchester Secondary School, where he was named Ontario Player of the Year in 2001. The New York Mets drafted Robinson out of high school in the 30th round (897th overall) of the 2002 Major League Baseball (MLB) Draft, but he did not sign, opting to enroll in college. Robinson enrolled at the University of Illinois at Urbana–Champaign, where he played college baseball for the Illinois Fighting Illini baseball team in the Big Ten Conference in the National Collegiate Athletic Association's Division I. At Illinois, Robinson was named the Big Ten Conference All-Star catcher in 2004 and 2005. In 2004, he played collegiate summer baseball with the Hyannis Mets of the Cape Cod Baseball League and was named a league all-star.

== Professional career ==
=== Detroit Tigers ===
Out of Illinois, the Detroit Tigers drafted Robinson in the third round (90th overall) of the 2005 MLB draft. He was named the Tigers' best defensive catcher.

=== Chicago Cubs ===
In 2006, the Tigers traded Robinson to the Chicago Cubs for Neifi Pérez.

=== Baltimore Orioles ===
On December 15, 2011, Robinson signed a minor league contract with the Texas Rangers organization, receiving an invitation to spring training. He was released prior to the start of the season on March 30, 2012.

On April 3, 2012, Robinson signed a minor league contract with the Baltimore Orioles and was assigned to the Triple-A Norfolk Tides.

Robinson started the 2013 season with Norfolk.

=== San Diego Padres ===
On June 20, 2013, Robinson was traded to the San Diego Padres and assigned to the Triple-A Tucson Padres. On August 15, Robinson had his contract selected by the Padres to replace Nick Hundley, who had been placed on the paternity list. Robinson was optioned back to Tucson on August 17 without appearing in a game when Hundley returned, briefly becoming a phantom ballplayer. He was recalled on September 1 when rosters expanded. On September 25, Robinson hit a pinch-hit three-run home run in the eight inning to record both his first major league hit and home run. He was designated for assignment on September 30. Robinson cleared waivers and was sent outright to Triple-A Tucson on October 4. He elected free agency on November 4.

Robinson was presented with a special recognition award by the Major League Baseball Players Association at the Baseball Canada National Teams Award Banquet in January, 2014. On February 14, 2014, Robinson announced his retirement from professional baseball.

Robinson later became a full-time coach at Centerfield Sports and with the Great Lake Canadians in London, Ontario.

== International career ==
Robinson has also competed for the Canadian national baseball team. Robinson played in the 2002 World Junior Baseball Championship, the 2003 Baseball World Cup, the 2006 World Baseball Classic, the 2009 Baseball World Cup, the 2011 Pan American Games, the 2013 World Baseball Classic and the 2015 Pan American Games.
