= Elaine Goble =

Canadian visual artist

Elaine Goble is a Canadian visual artist who lives in Ottawa, Ontario.

== Biography ==
=== Early life ===
Elaine Goble was born in 1956 in St. Thomas, Ontario to Mr. and Mrs. Grant Goble of Avon, Canada. In 1979, Goble moved to Ottawa, Ontario, where she continues to live, and worked as a secretary on Parliament Hill during her first five years there. In 1981, she married Denis Rozon who worked as a system analyst. In 1990, they had two daughters, Alianne Rozon and Amélie Rozon, eighteen months apart. In the early 1980s, Goble decided to work full time as a Visual Artist after being offered to exhibit her work at the McPherson Gallery in Ottawa, Ontario. She resigned from her full-time job in Ottawa, Ontario to pursue her artistic career in the early 1980s upon meeting Paul Duval, her mentor.

=== Education ===
Goble graduated in 1975 from Lord Dorchester Secondary School, which is near London, Ontario. In 1975 she continued her education at York University, in Toronto, Ontario. After two years of working towards a Bachelor of Fine Arts degree at York University, she moved back to Avon, Ontario due to the high pressure of becoming an artist in the city. In 1977, Goble enrolled at the University of Western Ontario where she graduated with a Bachelor of Arts degree.

== Works ==
=== Artistic process ===
Although Goble has worked in a variety of mediums, she favors pencil drawings the most. Goble finds inspiration from photographs of strangers, an example of this is referencing pictures of veterans she took at a Remembrance Day ceremony in Ottawa, Ontario. Through her drawings she hopes to emphasize the subjects personalities by listening to their stories and combining significant details of their lives within each piece. Goble's hyper-realism works fall under the classification of representational art with a focus on portraiture drawings. In her Cost of War: The Canadian Homefront exhibition, the process of each piece took 6–9 months to complete, this included multiple meetings with her subjects to understand their background and engage in photography sessions.

Within her work, Goble consistently uses photography to develop compositions, exhibit and donate works, while never considering herself a professional photographer. Photography is a vital tool in her artistic process used to capture her subjects. Afterward, she creates using graphite, with subtle use of egg tempera and sometimes oil paint. This process begins with a photograph being printed then transferred onto large pieces of mat board where she then copies the images onto her own support. She uses a detailed hand with tiny strokes to create her desired tones and lines. The range of values in her palette is diverse, using graphite pencils as dark as 6B. Her works done in graphite maintain a photographic composition and origin even though the medium is different. This effect happens through the use of finite detail and, almost always the whole surface is depicted in hyper-realism. Over the years, she has questioned the value of her photographs compared to her finished artworks, both attract genuine attention but more serious institutional interest and dollar value are placed on her handcrafted drawings and paintings over the photographs. Due to this, Goble does not consider her two practices equal.

=== Major works ===
Among Goble's most famous works is a 2008 drawing titled Lucy and Her Family. This work depicts the true story of Lucy Gagnon who is pictured alongside her husband and teenage daughter. The three of them stand with Lucy who is in the front wearing her military uniform. Gagnon was a neighbor of Gobles and at this time Lucy had been faced with the opportunity to go over to Afghanistan for an important posting, with all her gear packed and ready to go she noticed that even though she was all ready for the mission, her daughter may not have been. Realizing this, Lucy had to decide on whether she should respond to the call to Afghanistan or be present with her family. Goble demonstrates that the final decision of what Lucy chose is not important here. While explaining what this piece is about Elaine says, "I think what's really important is that she was put in a position where there was no right answer, where there are messy unfortunate decisions that will make people unhappy when one has to go into a dangerous area and leave kith and kin behind." For over a decade, she worked on her contemporary war-themed series that is inspired by the consequences of war. Her dedication and hard work allowed her to exhibit this series at the McMichael Canadian Art Collection in Kleinburg, Ontario, The Canadian War Museum, Ottawa, and the Canadian Museum of Civilization, Gatineau.

=== Themes ===
In the past 25 years, Goble's work has been largely focused on the legacies of war, specifically the Second World War and how military families are affected by it. Elaine Goble has been an active artist in contemporary military art by researching alternative perspectives on war life as she transitions from traditional, documentary depictions of war to further question the military's activities and critically examine the problems of military life on the soldiers and their families. Challenging old views on history with new perspectives allows for an increased limitation on the bias since there are more diverse views on the subject being depicted. There have been gallery guidelines that sometimes prohibit the acceptance of these types of artworks due to the type of narrative they are trying to display, which is a struggle the artists under this movement experience. Other artists following this movement of contemporary military art include Gertrude Kearns, Allan Harding Makay, Scott Waters, and Alex Colville.

=== Exhibitions ===
Elaine Goble's artistic career started in 1977, she had a solo exhibition at Founders Art Gallery at York University and an exhibition of Oil Paintings at Hart House, Toronto Ontario. In 1978, she participated in the Juried Group Exhibition of Prints, at the Art Gallery of the University of Western Ontario. The mid- late 1980s exhibitions such as: Solo Drawing Exhibition, McPherson Gallery, Ottawa, Ontario, 1985. Group Exhibition, Juried, City Hall, Ottawa, Ontario, 1986. Solo Drawing Exhibition, Nancy Poole's Studio, Toronto, Ontario, 1987. About Faces, Group Portrait Exhibition, Nancy Poole's Studio, Toronto, Ontario, 1988. She ended the decade with A Private Moment, Solo Exhibition of Egg Tempera Paintings, Nancy Poole's Studio, Toronto, Ontario, 1989.3 In the early 1990s, Goble's career took off with a total of seven exhibitions between 1990 and 1994. These included: Works on Paper, Juried Group Exhibition, ArtsCount, Ottawa, Ontario, 1990. Invitational, Nancy Poole's Studio, Toronto, Ontario, 1990. Rediscovering the Art of Painting, Group Exhibition, Nancy Poole's Studio, Toronto, Ontario, 1991. Solo Exhibition, Robertson's Gallery, Ottawa, Ontario, 1992. National Fine Art Competition, Group Exhibition, Toronto, Ontario, 1993. The Canadian Figure, Group Exhibition, Nancy Poole's Studio, Toronto, Ontario, 1993. Portraits, Solo Exhibition of Egg Tempera Paintings, Nancy Poole's Studio, Toronto, Ontario, 1994. In the late 1990s, Goble began to focus on solo exhibitions which include: The Collection- Ten Years Later, Karsh- Masson Gallery, Ottawa, Ontario, 1996. Canadian Achievement, Phase 1, Solo Exhibition, Paintings, Drawings, and Photography, New Brunswick Museum, Saint John, New Brunswick, 1996. And continued with Canadian Achievement, Phase II, Solo Exhibition, Paintings, Drawings, and Photography, New Brunswick Museum, Saint John, New Brunswick, 1997. Ending the century with a Portrait Exhibition, Wallacks Galleries, Ottawa, Ontario, 1999. Afterwards, she slowed down in the early 2000s participating in two exhibitions; one being the Solo Exhibition, Gallery Telpaz, Ottawa, Ontario, 2000 and the Group Portrait and Figure Exhibition, Abbozzo Gallery, Oakville, Ontario, 2003. In the mid-late 2000s, she began producing some work that she is most well known for; Solo Exhibition, Dale Smith Gallery, Ottawa, Ontario, 2005. Promises to Keep, Canadian War Museum, Ottawa, Ontario, 2005–2007. Painting of Ground Zero, Canadian War Museum, Ottawa, Ontario, 2007–2009. Star Portraits, PTV/ Bravo Production, Documentary, 2009. War, a Family Affair, McMichael Canadian Art Collection, Kleinberg. Kingston Prize Exhibition, Kingston, Ontario, 2009. Finally, an exhibition that caught the attention of the media, Cost of War- The Canadian Homefront, solo exhibition, St. Lawrence College, Brockville, Ontario, 2009. In 2010, she participated in the Juried Exhibition, Art Gallery of Peterborough, Peterborough, Ontario, and in 2011 Goble was commissioned by the National Capital to create Portraits in the Street that was then featured in the National Archives of Canada, Ottawa, Ontario. In 2012, she created one major piece, Double Take: Portraits of Intriguing Canadians, and continued it as a traveling exhibition featured at a variety of locations between the years of 2012–2014. These locations include: McMichael Canadian Art Collection, Kleinburg, Ontario, 2012. Canadian Museum of Civilization (now known as the Canadian Museum of History), Gatineau, Quebec, 2013. The Agnes Etherington Art Centre, Queen's University at Kingston, Ontario, 2013–2014, and the Canadian Military Engineers Museum, Oromocto, New Brunswick, 2014. Her most recent works include: The Painted Truth, Wallack Galleries, Ottawa, Ontario, 2015. Group Exhibition: Go Figure at First Canadian Place, Abbozzo Gallery, Toronto, Ontario, 2016. Egg Tempera and Mixed Media Landscape and Architecture Paintings in the Feature Gallery, Abbozzo Gallery, Toronto, Ontario. Agriculture and Food Museum, Ingenium Canada, Ottawa, Ontario, 2016. The Tamworth, Egg Tempera painting showcased at Canada Agriculture and Food Museum, Ingenium Canada, Ottawa, Ontario, 2018. Lastly, a Group Exhibition, Abbozzo Gallery, Toronto, Ontario, 2019.

=== Collections ===
- Canadian War Museum
- National Defence Canada, Canadian Military Engineers Museum
- Royal Canadian Mint
- Canada Council Art Bank
- Queen's University, Agnes Etherington Art Centre
- New Brunswick Museum, Saint John, New Brunswick, Canada
- City of Ottawa

=== Awards and achievements ===
- 2013: Made a life-long member of the Principal's Circle of Distinction, Grant Hall Society, Queen's University at Kingston, Ontario.
- 2010: Short- listed for the Diamond Jubilee Portrait of Her Majesty, The Queen of Canada
- 2009: Finalist - The Kingston Prize
- 2005: Award: Artist for the Year of the Veteran coin design, Royal Canadian Mint, Commissioned by the Royal Canadian Mind to design commemorative coin of the Year of the Veteran
  - 30 Million quarters in general circulation
  - 20,000 Ten-dollar fine silver collection coins
- 1997- 2000: Exclusive Portrait for the Canadian Figure Skating Association's Hall of Fame
- 1997: Assistant to photographer Malak Karsh
- 1993: First place, Portraiture, Canadian National Fine Arts Competition
