= USS Dorchester =

Two ships of the United States Navy have been named USS Dorchester:

- USS Dorchester (SP-1509), a schooner in commission as a patrol vessel from 1917 to 1918
- USS Dorchester (APB-46), a barracks ship in commission from 1945 to 1946

== See also ==
- SS Dorchester, a War Shipping Administration troop transport, converted from a civilian cruise ship, notable for the Four Chaplains incident of 1943
