= Lord Dorchester Secondary School =

Lord Dorchester Secondary School (LDSS)
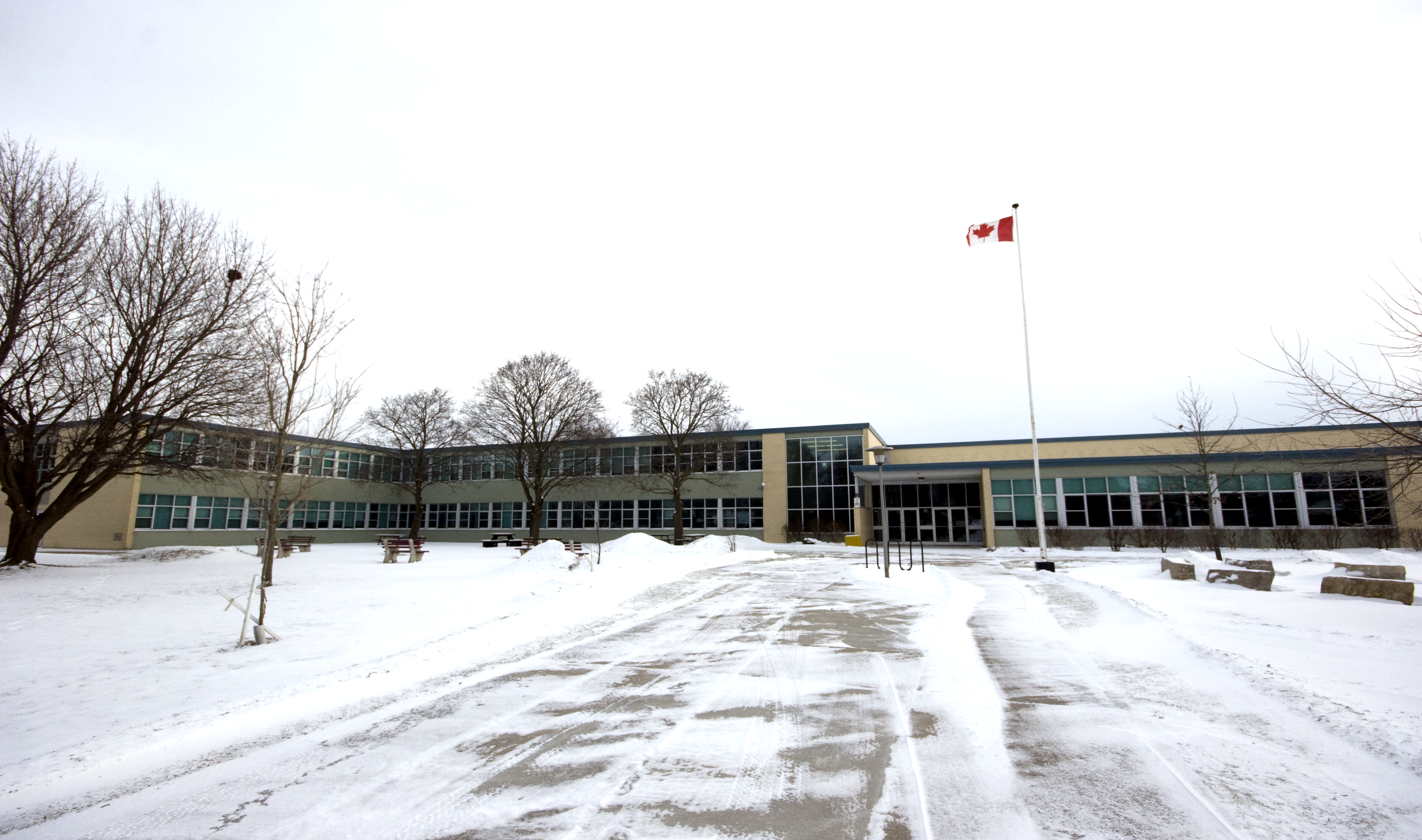

Location
- 61 Queen Street; Dorchester, Ontario, N0L 1G2; Canada; 42.9870833°N 081.0623833°W

Information
- School type: Secondary
- Founded: 1961
- School board: Thames Valley District School Board
- Principal: R. Shave
- Grades: 9–12
- Enrollment: 850
- Language: English
- Colours: Red, Black and Gold
- Mascot: Beaver
- Team name: Beavers
- Website: www.tvdsb.ca/LordDorchester.cfm

Lord Dorchester Secondary School is a Thames Valley District School Board Secondary School located in the town of Dorchester, Ontario, part of the municipality of Thames Centre, in the county of Middlesex, in Ontario, Canada.

Although small when compared to urban secondary schools, Lord Dorchester is larger than many rural-area schools. The student population hovers in the range of 500 students. Lord Dorchester is a strong academic school (based on provincial test scores), but also offers a range of non-academic courses such as shop classes to go along with core subjects in mathematics, sciences, and the arts. Lord Dorchester lacks sports teams which can draw students away from the school. The mascot of Lord Dorchester is the Canadian beaver.

== The school ==
Lord Dorchester Secondary School was constructed in 1961 and is named for Guy Carleton, 1st Baron Dorchester.

The current school grounds include a two-story school building with an attached cafeteria and a gymnasium, two auxiliary storage buildings, an outdoor courtyard, and a very large open field that accommodates school sports as well as community recreation.

Throughout the years, the school has undergone a series of renovations and upgrades. In the early 1990s, a music room was built as an addition to the school. Over the summer of 2007 asbestos was removed and windows and exterior doors were upgraded. In the Spring of 2015 the library was renovated.

== Sports and athletics ==
Lord Dorchester has a large number of extracurricular sports and athletic programs. The school competes in the 'A' class under the Thames Valley Regional Athletic Association (TVRAA), the Western Ontario Secondary Schools Athletic Association (WOSSAA), and provincially under the Ontario Federation of School Athletic Associations (OFSAA). Most teams are run by faculty staff. Boys' and girls' teams participate in hockey, basketball, volleyball, soccer, golf, tennis, archery, badminton, baseball/softball, swimming, track and field, and cross country running. The track and field team is a source of pride for the school due to recent successes at OFSAA (2nd Girls Team Overall in the 2014 Championships, 3rd 2016, 4 × 400 m Champions in 2014 and 2016) and WOSSAA (Girls Overall Champions in 2015 and 2016). The swim team also attended OFSAA in 2025.

== Notable alumni ==
- Charlie Stephens – professional ice hockey
- Glen Weir – CFL football
- Elaine Goble – Canadian visual artist
- Evelyn Hart – Royal Winnipeg Ballet
- Chris Robinson – San Diego Padres, Canadian Olympian
- Ryan Roobroeck – professional ice hockey

== See also ==
- Education in Ontario
- List of secondary schools in Ontario
