= Dorchester, Ontario =

Town in Ontario, Canada

Dorchester
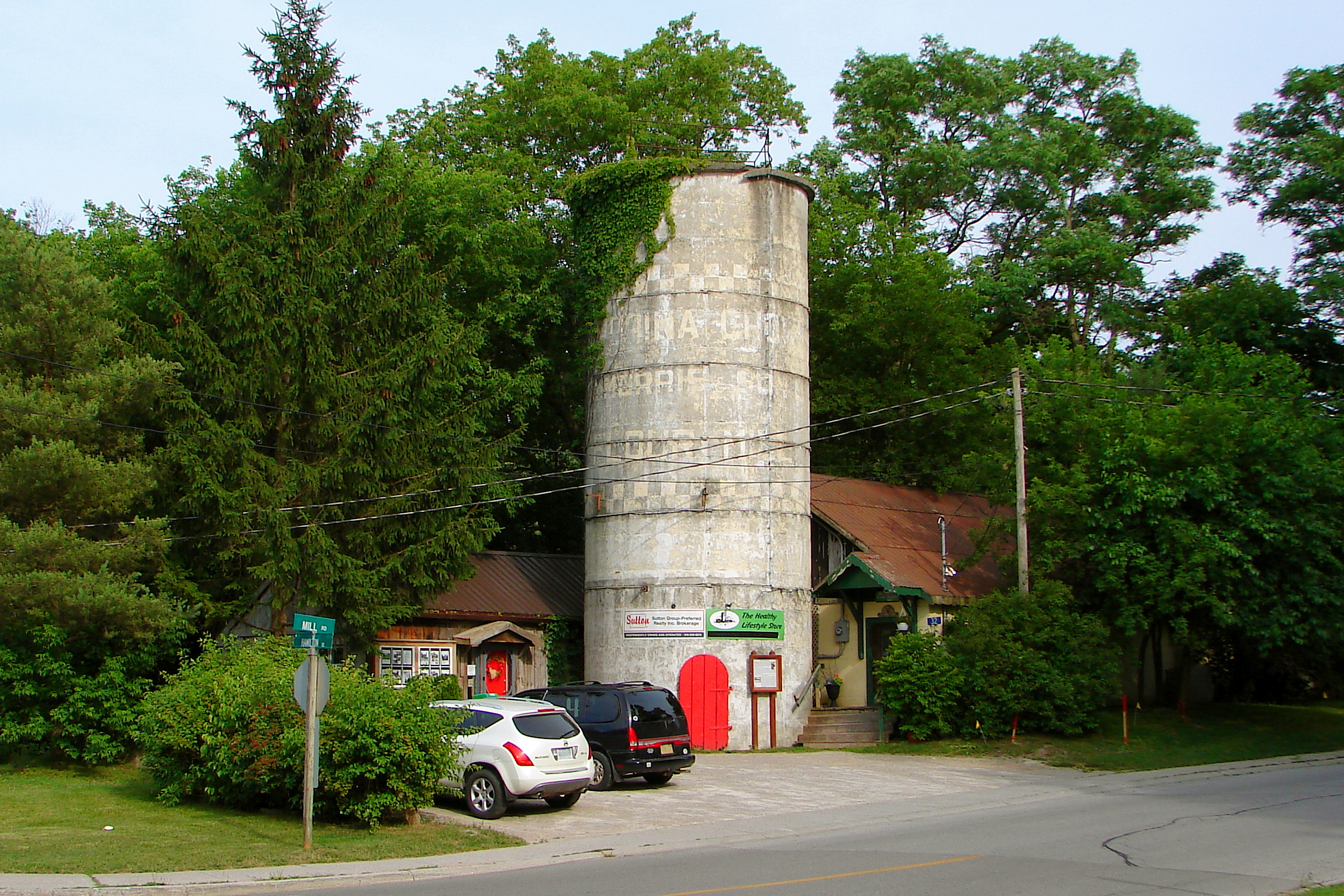

- Location within Ontario
- Coordinates: 42°59′N 81°04′W
- Country: Canada
- Province: Ontario
- County: Middlesex
- Website: www.thamescentre.on.ca

Dorchester is a town in Ontario whose name first applied to the township and honours Sir Guy Carleton, Lord Dorchester (1724-1808). The name was changed from Dorchester Station on May 3, 1961. Dorchester is the residential and commercial core of the municipality of Thames Centre, in Southwestern Ontario, Canada, a few kilometres directly east of the city of London, Ontario. According to the 2016 census, the town has a population of 3,911.

The local arena underwent a $10 million expansion and opened on November 2, 2010. This expansion added a second NHL-sized ice pad, a gymnasium, and many other facilities to go along with upgrades to the existing part. It is now home to the Dorchester Dolphins Junior C hockey team. Much of the funding raised was done by local events such as Raise the Roof and TC Rocks, an outdoor concert.

Inspired by the 1989 movie "Field of Dreams", Thames Centre is currently constructing a new outdoor recreation centre complex at 3245 Hamilton Rd. The new recreation centre will have a baseball diamond, three full size soccer pitches, two mini-pitches, a pond, and a proposed clubhouse. The total cost is an estimated $200,000. In the master plan, the municipality wishes to make the recreation centre in recognition of the need for children, youths, adults, masters, and people with disabilities.

== Demographics ==
From 2016 Statistics Canada, the population centre (Village) of Dorchester, Ontario:

- Population, 2016 3,911
- Population, 2011 4,003
- Population percentage change, 2011 to 2016 -2.3%
- Total private dwellings 1,467
- Dwelling condition: Only regular maintenance or minor repairs needed 1,385. Major repairs needed 55 (3.8%)
- Population density per square kilometre 1,109.7
- Land area in square kilometers 3.52

== Geography ==
- Crossroads: Dorchester Rd & Hamilton Rd
- Access: Highway 401 Via Exit 203 or Exit 199.
- Dialing Area Code: (519)
- Local Exchanges: 268, 202, 499
- Postal Code: N0L
- Water Bodies: The Thames River flows through the village from the east to the west.

== Schools ==
There are four schools in Dorchester. As with most of the schools in the areas surrounding London, they are part of either the Thames Valley District School Board or the London District Catholic School Board.

- River Heights Public School: Located on Hamilton Road. This is a school for children in junior kindergarten to Grade 3.
- Northdale Central Public School: Located on Catherine Street. Most children come here after River Heights, for Grades 4 to 8.
- St. David's Catholic School: Also on Catherine Street, next to Northdale. This school is for Catholic children from Kindergarten to Grade 8.
- Lord Dorchester Secondary School: Located on Queen Street. Open since 1961, LDSS is the alma mater of many distinguished graduates.

== Media ==
Dorchester has a community newspaper, The Signpost. The Signpost is written as an as-seen historical context of the town. It updates residents on current daily political, agricultural, educational, and global issues. A consistent feature in the paper is an historical reference to the town's history; events, sports, achievements, and a daily archive are included. The Signpost has served as an important historical record throughout the town's growth.

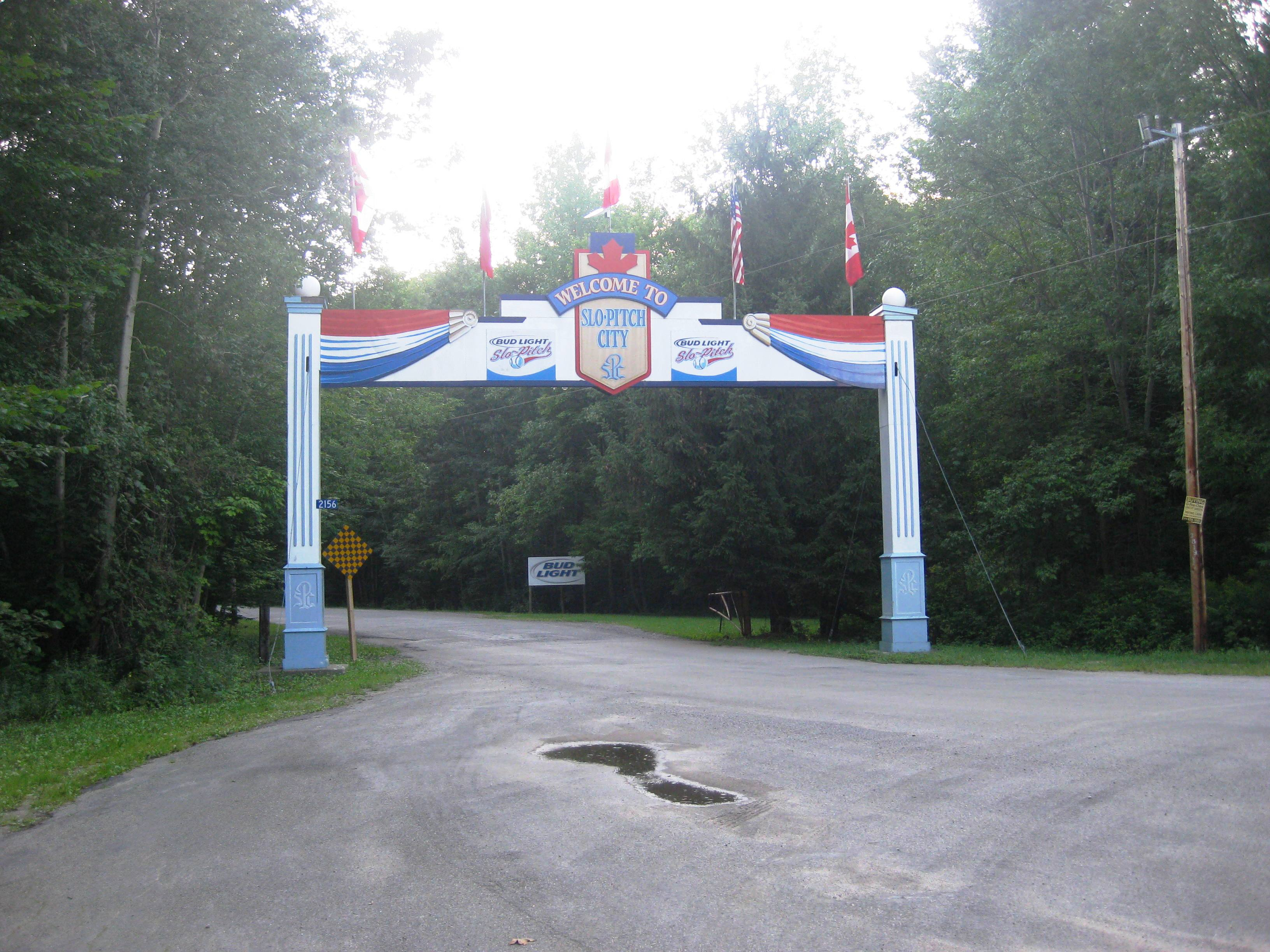
Slo-Pitch City Softball Complex.

== Notable people ==
- William Black Creighton (1864-1946), pacifism activist
- Evelyn Hart (b. 1956), Royal Winnipeg Ballet
- Boone Jenner, NHL player (Washington Capitals)
- Chris Robinson (b. 1984), Canadian Olympian, Pan Am Games champion, MLB catcher
- Ryan Roobroeck (b. 2007), hockey player
- Glen Weir, CFL player
