= Guy Carleton, 1st Baron Dorchester =

British Army officer and colonial administrator (1724–1808)

General The Right Honourable The Lord Dorchester KB
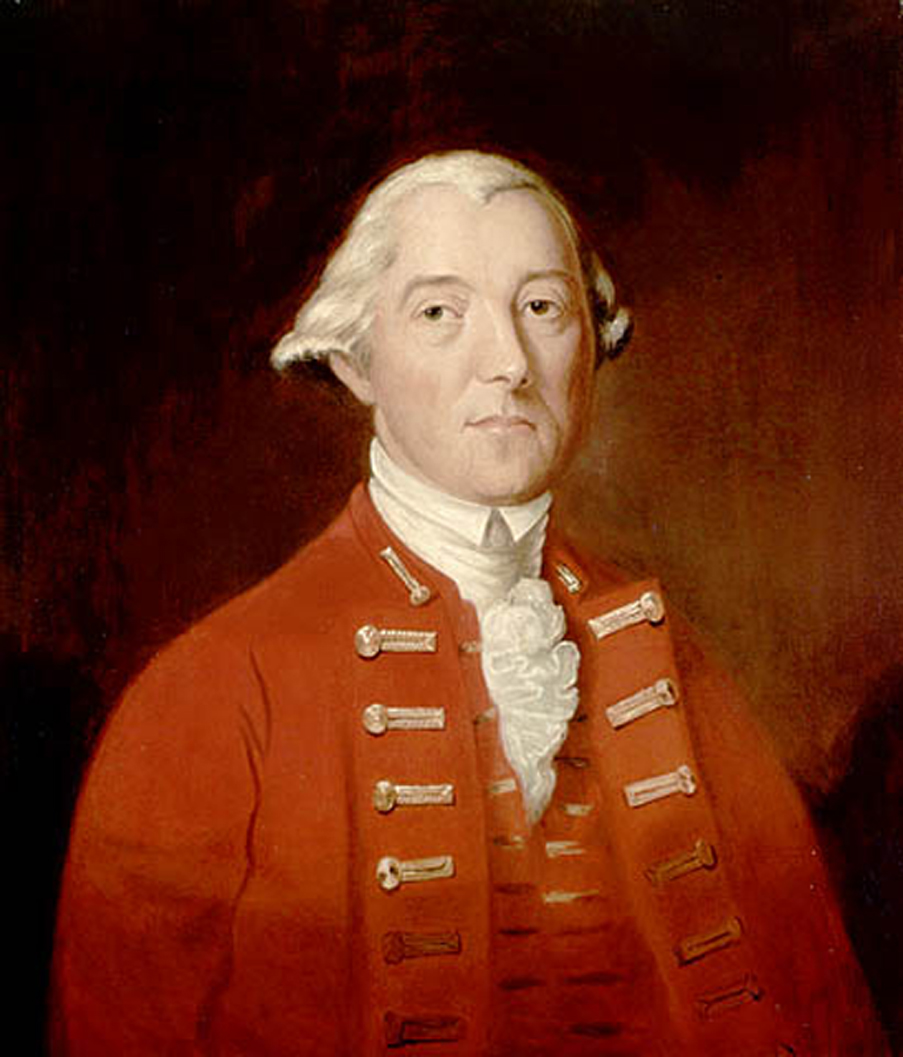
- Portrait, c. 1760

Governor of the Province of Quebec
- In office 1768–1778
- Monarch: George III
- Preceded by: James Murray
- Succeeded by: Sir Frederick Haldimand

Governor General of the Canadas
- In office 1786–1796
- Monarch: George III
- Preceded by: Sir Frederick Haldimand
- Succeeded by: Robert Prescott

Personal details
- Born: 3 September 1724 Strabane, County Tyrone, Ireland
- Died: 10 November 1808 (aged 84) Maidenhead, Berkshire, England
- Awards: Knight of the Order of the Bath

Military service
- Allegiance: Great Britain
- Branch/service: British Army
- Years of service: 1742–1796
- Rank: General
- Commands: America; Quebec; The Canadas
- Battles/wars: War of the Austrian Succession; Seven Years' War; American War of Independence

General Guy Carleton, 1st Baron Dorchester, KB (3 September 1724 – 10 November 1808), known between 1776 and 1786 as Sir Guy Carleton, was a British Army officer and colonial administrator. He twice served as governor of the Province of Quebec, from 1768 to 1778, concurrently serving as Governor General of the Canadas in that time, and again from 1785 to 1795. The title Baron Dorchester was created on 21 August 1786.

He commanded British troops in the American Revolutionary War, first leading the defence of Quebec during the 1775 rebel invasion, and the 1776 counteroffensive that drove the rebels from the province. In 1782 and 1783, he led as the commander-in-chief of all British forces in North America. In this capacity he was notable for carrying out the Crown's promise of freedom to slaves who joined the British, and he oversaw the evacuation of British forces, Loyalists, and more than 3,000 freedmen from New York City in 1783 to transport them to a British colony. Toward this end, Carleton assigned Samuel Birch to create the Book of Negroes.

The military and political career of his younger brother, Thomas Carleton, was interwoven with his own, and Thomas served under him in the Canadas.

== Early career ==
Guy Carleton was born into an Ulster Protestant military family that had lived in Ulster in the north of the Kingdom of Ireland since the Plantation of Ulster in the 17th century, and was one of three brothers (the others being Thomas Carleton and William Carleton) who served in the British military. He was born and raised in Strabane in the west of County Tyrone, just across the River Foyle from Lifford in County Donegal. Guy also had a sister, Connolly Crawford. When he was fourteen his father, Christopher Carleton, died, and his mother, Catherine Carleton, then married Reverend Thomas Skelton, who took responsibility for his education.

In 1742, at the age of seventeen, Carleton was commissioned as an ensign into the 25th Regiment of Foot, in which in 1745 he was promoted to lieutenant. During this period he became a friend of James Wolfe; he may have served with Wolfe at the Battle of Culloden during the Jacobite rising of 1745. Two of his brothers, William and Thomas, also joined the British Army.

In 1740, the War of the Austrian Succession broke out in Europe. Despite British troops having been engaged on the European continent since 1742, it was not until 1747 that Carleton and his regiment were despatched to Flanders. They fought the French, but were unable to prevent the Fall of Bergen-op-Zoom, a major Dutch fortress, and the war was brought to a halt by an armistice. In 1748 the Treaty of Aix-la-Chapelle was signed and Carleton returned to Britain. He was frustrated to still only be a lieutenant, and believed his opportunities of advancement would be limited with the end of the war.

In 1751, he joined the 1st Foot Guards and in 1752, was promoted to captain. His career received a major boost when he was chosen, at the suggestion of Wolfe, to act as a guide to The 3rd Duke of Richmond during a tour of the battlefields of the recent war. Richmond would become an influential patron to Carleton.

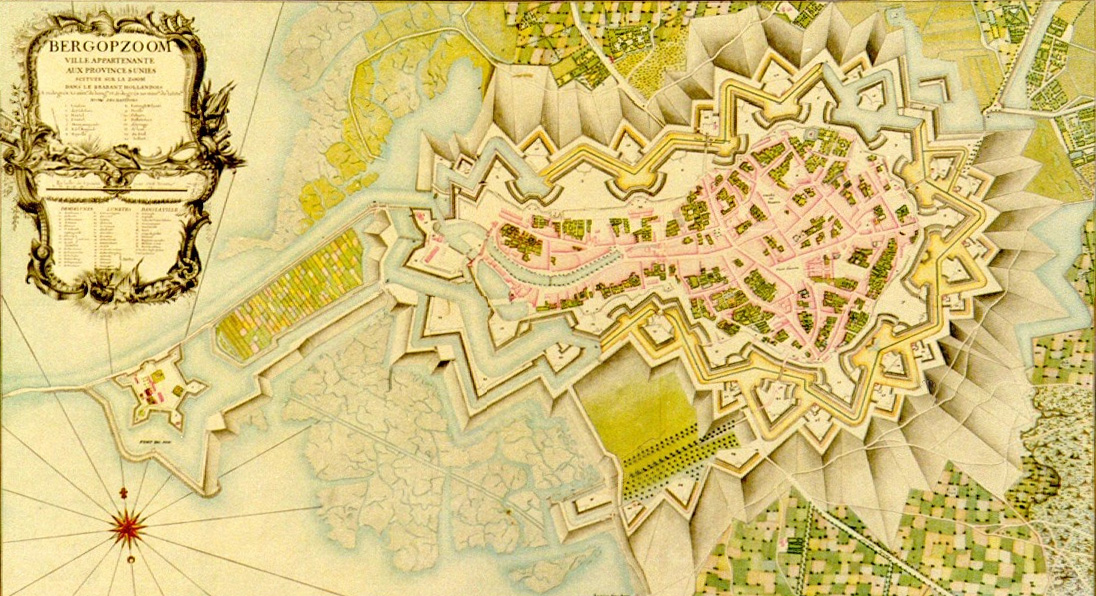
Bergen-op-Zoom where Guy Carleton first saw action in 1747. His son, George Carleton, would be killed in a later battle there.

== Seven Years' War ==
=== Germany ===
In 1757, Guy Carleton was made a lieutenant colonel and served as part of the Hanoverian Army of Observation made up of German troops designed to protect Hanover from French invasion. The army was forced to retreat following the Battle of Hastenbeck and eventually concluded the Convention of Klosterzeven, taking them out of the war. After the convention was signed, Carleton returned to Britain. In 1758 he was made the lieutenant colonel of the newly formed 72nd Regiment of Foot . James Wolfe selected Carleton as his aide in the 1758 attack on Louisbourg. King George II declined to make this appointment, possibly because of negative comments he made about the soldiers of Hanover during his service on the Continent.

For some time he was unable to gain active position, until he was sent back to Germany to serve as an aide-de-camp to Duke Ferdinand of Brunswick.

=== Canada ===
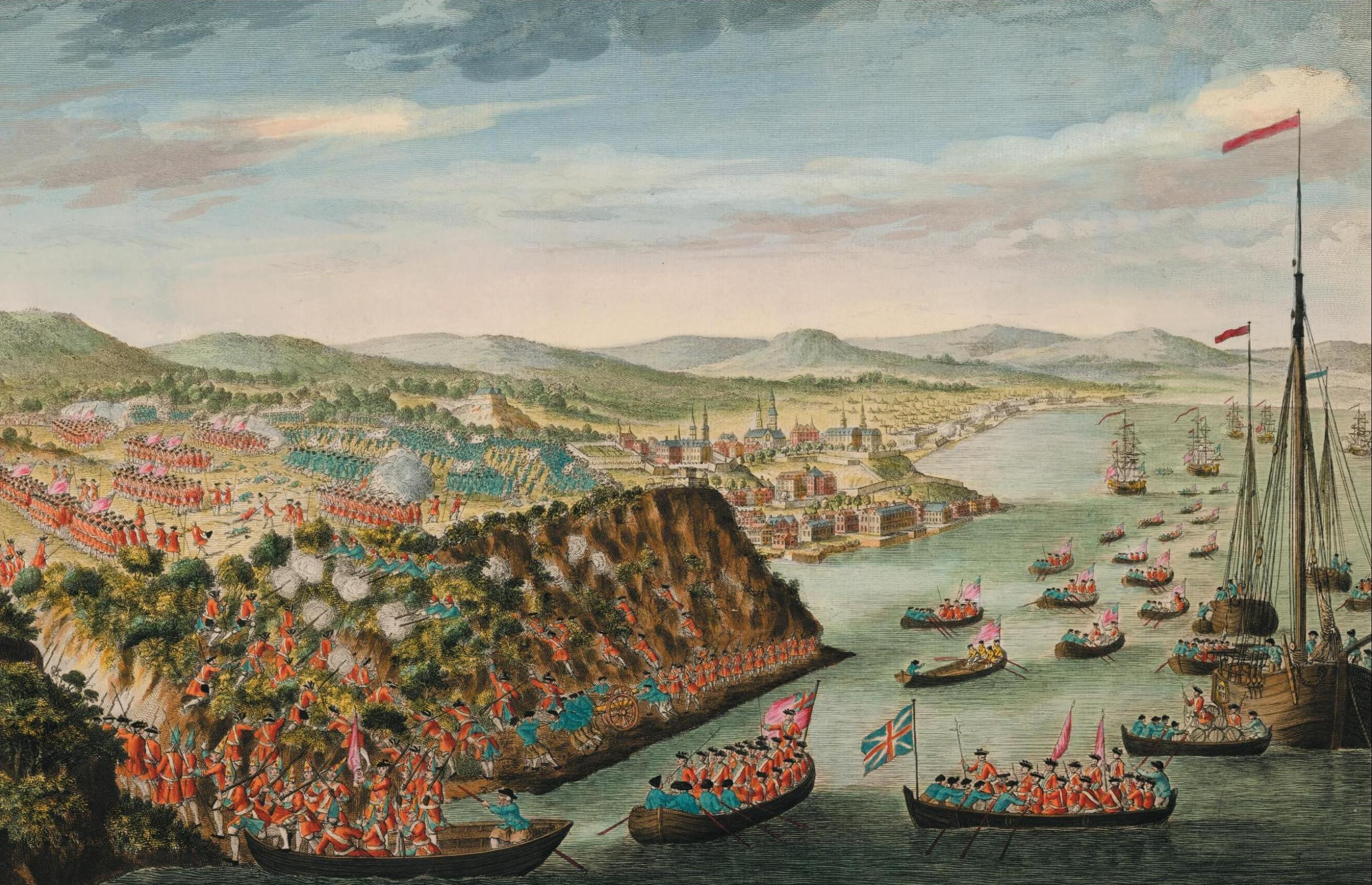
Drawing by a soldier of Wolfe's army depicting the easy climb by Wolfe's soldiers to capture Quebec in Canada

In December 1758 Wolfe, now a major general, was given command of the upcoming campaign against the city of Quebec, and selected Carleton as his quarter-master general. King George refused to make this appointment also until Lord Ligonier and William Pitt, 1st Earl of Chatham both talked to the king about the matter and the king changed his mind. When Lieutenant-Colonel Carleton arrived in Halifax he assumed command of six hundred grenadiers. He was with the British forces when they arrived at Quebec in June 1759. Carleton was responsible for the provisioning of the army and also acting as an engineer supervising the placement of cannon. Carleton received a head wound during the Battle of the Plains of Abraham and he returned to England after the battle in October 1759.

=== France and Havana ===
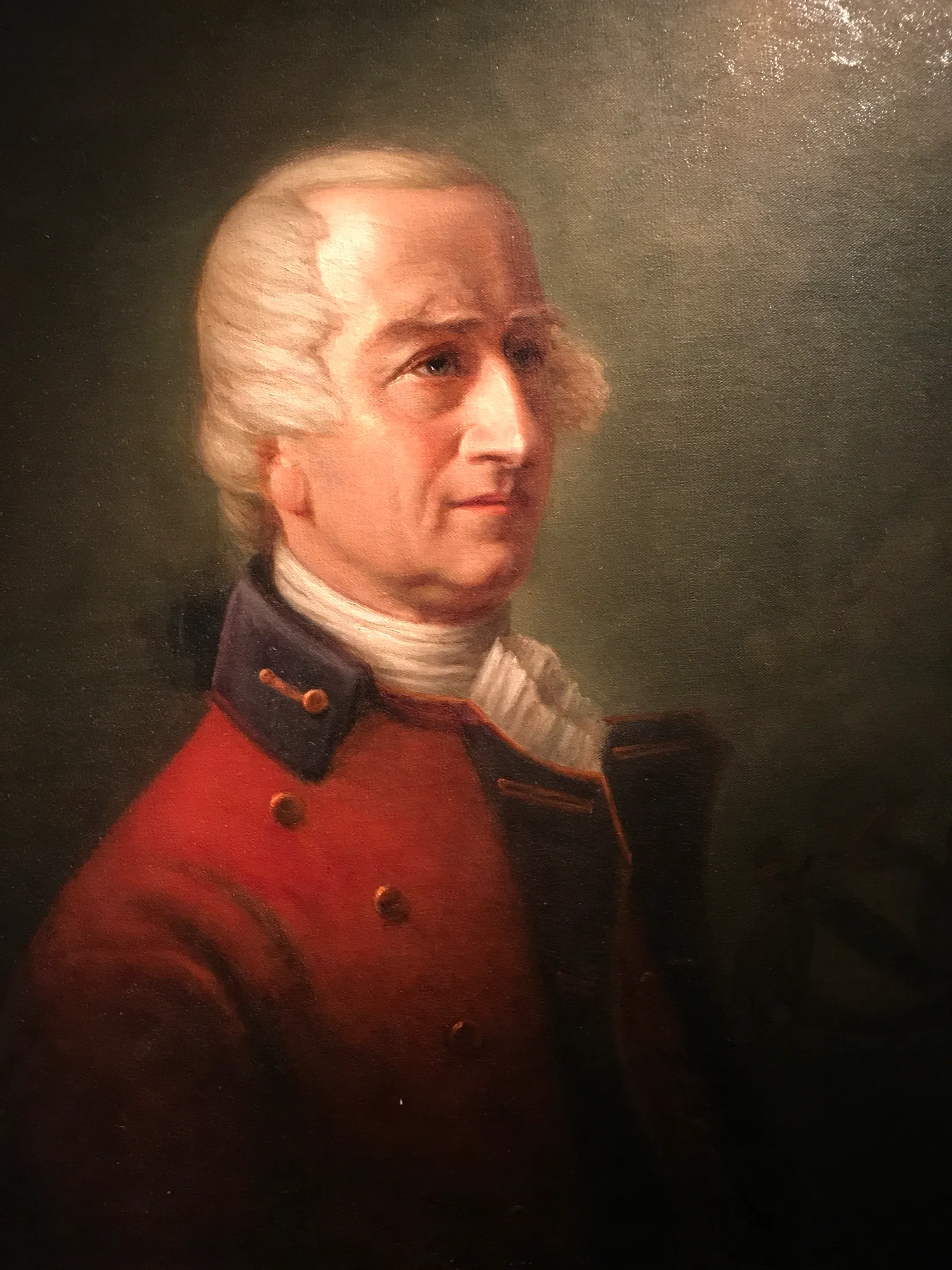
Posthumous portrait, c. 1895

On 29 March 1761, as the lieutenant colonel of the 72nd Regiment of Foot he took part in the attack on Belle Île, an island off the coast of the northern part of the Bay of Biscay, 10 miles (16 km) off the coast of France. Carleton led an attack on the French, but was seriously wounded and prevented from taking any further part in the fighting. After four weeks of fighting, the British gained complete control of the island.

He was made colonel in 1762 and took part in the British expedition against Cuba, which also included Richard Montgomery, who went on to oppose him in 1775. On 22 July, he was wounded leading an attack on a Spanish outpost.

In 1764 he transferred to the 93rd Regiment of Foot.

== Governor of Quebec ==
On 7 April 1766, Carleton was named acting Lieutenant Governor and Administrator of Quebec with James Murray officially in charge. He arrived in Quebec on 22 September 1766. As Carleton had no experience in public affairs and came from a politically insignificant family, his appointment was unusual and was possibly a surprise to him. One connection might have been due to the Duke of Richmond, who in 1766 been made Secretary of State for the North American colonies. Fourteen years earlier, Carleton had tutored the Duke. The Duke was the colonel of the 72nd Regiment of Foot, while Carleton was its lieutenant colonel. He appointed Carleton as commander-in-chief of all troops stationed in Quebec.

The government consisted of a Governor, a council, and an assembly. The governor could veto any action of the council, but London had also given Carleton instructions that all of his actions required the approval of the council. Most officials of the province at this time did not receive a salary and received their income through fees they charged for their services. Carleton tried to replace this system with one in which the officials received a regular salary, but this position was never supported in London. When Carleton renounced his own fees, Murray was furious.

After Murray resigned his position, Carleton was appointed Captain General and Governor-in-Chief on 12 April 1768. Carleton took the oath of office on 1 November 1768. On 9 August 1770 he sailed for Britain for what he thought was a few months' consultation on issues related to the integration of Quebec into the British system. During his absence, Hector Theophilus de Cramahé, the lieutenant governor, ran the provincial government, with the aid of the first chief justice, William Hey, and the Attorney-General, Francis Maseres. The British merchants of Quebec, many of whom had become disaffected with the colonial administration under Murray, were, at least initially, of good will. The merchants would later be agent for the Quebec Act 1774 (14 Geo. 3. c. 83) and finally the partition of the two Canadas in the Constitutional Act 1791 (31 Geo. 3. c. 31).

== Marriage and family ==
On 22 May 1772, at the age of nearly 48, Carleton married Lady Maria Howard (1753–1836), daughter of Thomas Howard, 2nd Earl of Effingham. They had nine sons and two daughters. His elder brothers having predeceased him, and himself dying two years before his father, third son Lieutenant-Colonel Christopher Carleton was father of Arthur, 2nd Baron Dorchester; Christopher's younger brother, the sixth son, Lieutenant-Colonel George Carleton, was father of Guy, the 3rd Baron.

The title was extinct at the 3rd Baron's death in 1897, but it was revived when his daughter, Henrietta, was created Baroness Dorchester; the title was extinct again at the death of her son, Dudley, 2nd Baron, in 1963.

== Later career ==
Carleton was promoted to major general on 25 May 1772. While he was in London, Parliament passed the Quebec Act 1774, based upon his recommendations. It determined how the province was to be administered and was part of a continuing effort to respect some French traditions while ensuring rights of citizens as understood by the Kingdom of Great Britain.

Carleton and Maria returned to Quebec on 18 September 1774, where he began implementing the provisions of the act. While the clergy and the seigneurs (petty gentry) were happy with provisions favourable to them, British merchants and migrants from the Thirteen Colonies objected to a number of the provisions, which they thought were pro-Catholic. They argued that only English-speaking Protestants should be able to vote or hold public office. Many of the habitants were unhappy with the provisions reinstating the tithe in support of the Catholic Church, as well as seigneurial obligations, such as the corvée (a labour requirement).

In late 1774, the First Continental Congress sent letters to Montreal denouncing the Quebec Act for promoting Catholicism by allowing Catholics to hold civil service positions and reinstating the tithe. John Brown, an agent for the Boston Committee of Correspondence, arrived in Montreal in early 1775 as part of an effort to persuade citizens to send delegates to the Second Continental Congress, scheduled to meet in May 1775. Carleton, while aware of this activity, did nothing to prevent it, beyond discouraging publication of the Congressional letter in the province's only newspaper.

== American War of Independence ==
=== Defence of Canada ===
Carleton received notice of the start of the rebellion in May 1775, soon followed by the news of the rebel capture of Fort Ticonderoga and Fort Crown Point, and the raid on Fort Saint-Jean. As he had previously sent two of his regiments to Boston, he had only about 800 regular soldiers left in Quebec. His attempts to raise a militia met with limited success at first, as neither the ethnic French nor the English residents were willing to join. The area's Natives were willing to fight on the British side, and the Crown wanted them to do so, but Carleton turned their offer down because he feared the Natives might attack non-combatants. For the same reason, he limited Guy Johnson and his Iroquois allies, who had come to Quebec from New York, to operating only in Quebec.

During the summer of 1775, Carleton directed the preparation of provincial defences, which were focused on Fort Saint-Jean. In September, the Continental Army began its invasion and besieged the fort. When it fell in November, Carleton was forced to flee from Montreal to Quebec City, escaping capture by disguising himself as a commoner.

In December 1775 he directed the city's defences in the Battle of Quebec and the ensuing siege, which was broken by the arrival of British troops in May 1776 under command of John Burgoyne, who was appointed second-in-command. Carleton's younger brother Thomas was part of the relief effort.

Guy Carleton launched a counteroffensive against the rebels, which included repelling an attempted attack on Trois-Rivières. In June 1776, he was appointed a Knight Companion of the Bath. He was promoted to the rank of a general for America only on 26 March 1776.

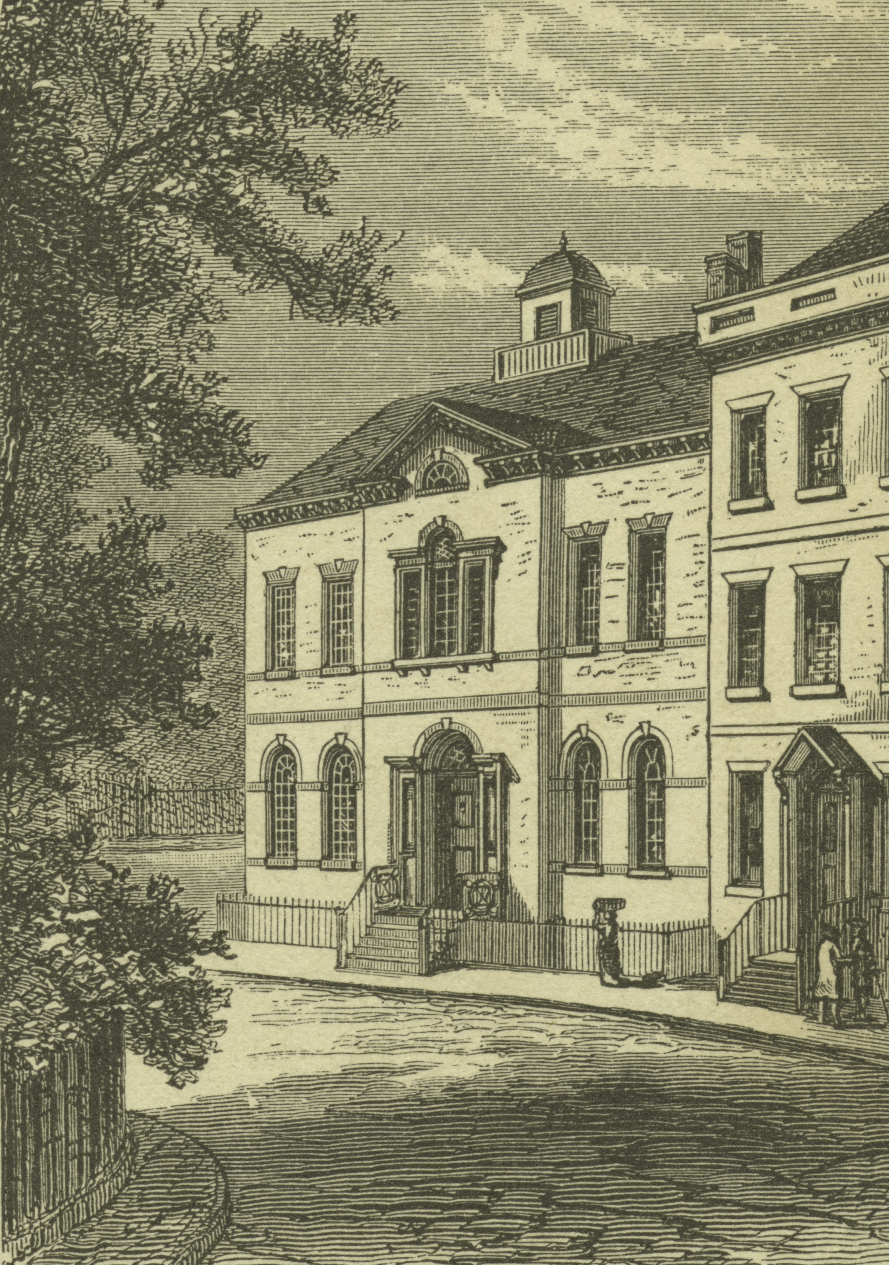
Number One Broadway. This building was the headquarters of the British Commander-in-Chief during the American Revolution.

The next month Carleton commanded British naval forces on the Richelieu River, culminating in the Battle of Valcour Island on Lake Champlain in October 1776 against a rebel fleet led by General Benedict Arnold. The British, with a significantly superior fleet, won a decisive victory, destroying or capturing most of the rebel fleet, but the delay prevented Carleton from continuing on to capture Fort Ticonderoga that year. His brother Thomas and nephew Christopher both served on his staff during the campaign. The morning following the battle, a small island in Lake Champlain was named Carleton's Prize, perhaps to Carleton's embarrassment at the time.

He was promoted to lieutenant general on 6 September 1777. In 1777, command of the major northern expedition to divide the rebel colonies was given to General Burgoyne. Upset that he had not been given its command, Carleton asked to be recalled. He was replaced as governor and military commander of Quebec in 1778 by Frederick Haldimand, and returned to Britain. In 1780 he was appointed by Prime Minister Lord North to a commission investigating public finances. This post he held until 1782, when General Sir Henry Clinton was recalled in the aftermath of the 1781 surrender at Yorktown. Carleton was appointed to replace Clinton as Commander-in-Chief, America, in May 1782. His headquarters in New York City were located at Number One Broadway.

=== Evacuation of New York ===
In August 1783, Carleton was informed that Great Britain would grant the United States its independence. With his exit from New York imminent, Carleton asked to be relieved of his command. After this news, Loyalists began an exodus from the Thirteen Colonies and Carleton did his best to have them resettled outside the United States.

In May he had met George Washington, amongst others, to arrange for the implementation of those parts of the Treaty of Paris relating to the evacuation of New York City, then commanded by Carleton and still occupied by the British Army, many Loyalists and former slaves. Carleton had refused to deliver over the human property to the Americans at the time of the British evacuation. Instead, he proposed a registry so that "the owners might eventually be paid for the slaves who were entitled to their freedom by British Proclamation and promises."

Sir Guy noted that nothing could be changed in any Articles that were inconsistent with prior policies or National Honour. He added that the only mode was to pay for the Negroes, in which case justice was done to all, the former slaves and the owners. Carleton said that it would be a breach of faith not to honour the British policy of liberty to the Negro and declared that if removing them proved to be an infraction of the treaty, then compensation would have to be paid by the British government. To provide for such a contingency, he had a register kept of all Negroes who left, called the Book of Negroes, entering their names, ages, occupations, and names of their former masters. The Americans agreed to this but the Crown never paid compensation. The Loyalist Claims Commission, using the logic of the Somerset Case and the Philipsburg Proclamation, determined that people could not be claimed as property, and only property could be a matter of compensation. The British transported about 3,000 freedmen and other Black Loyalists to Nova Scotia, The Bahamas, and as far away as Germany for resettlement in the evacuation of New York City in November 1783 alone. Thousands more, under the same agreement, were evacuated from Charleston, Savannah, and St. Augustine. All told, historians estimate that between 50,000 and 80,000 enslaved people were freed as the result of Carleton's final enforcement of British proclamations, leading to, as historian Cassandra Pybus has described it, the "single greatest act of abolition in early American history."

Washington, who worked to re-enslave free Black Loyalists (which included former slaves at Mount Vernon), strenuously disagreed with Sir Guy's actions and wrote: "…the measure is totally different from the letter and spirit of the Treaty but waiving the specialty of the point, leaving this decision to our respective Sovereigns I find it my duty to signify my readiness in conjunction with you to enter into agreements, or take any measures which may be deemed expedient to prevent the future carrying away any Negroes or other property of the American people."

On 28 November the evacuation was finished, and on 5 December Carleton departed from Staten Island to return to Great Britain. John Campbell of Strachur succeeded him as Commander-in-Chief, North America, although the post was then much reduced in scope.

== Post-war years and death ==
Once he was back in London, Carleton recommended the creation of a position of governor general of all the provinces in British North America. Instead, he was appointed "Governor-in-chief", with simultaneous appointments as governor of Quebec, New Brunswick, Nova Scotia, and St. John's Island (present-day Prince Edward Island). He arrived in Quebec on 23 October 1786. His position as Governor-in-chief was mostly ignored. He found quickly that his authority in any of the provinces other than Quebec was effective only while he was present in person.

He was raised to the Peerage of Great Britain in August 1786 as Baron Dorchester, of Dorchester in the County of Oxford. (His title therefore referred to the village of Dorchester on Thames, rather than to the better-known county town of Dorset.)

The Constitutional Act of 1791 split the large territory of Quebec into Upper and Lower Canada, corresponding roughly to areas settled by ethnic British and ethnic French, respectively. Sir Alured Clarke was named as the lieutenant governor of Lower Canada and John Graves Simcoe the lieutenant governor of Upper Canada. In August 1791 Carleton left for Britain and on 7 February 1792 took his seat in the House of Lords. He left for Canada again on 18 August 1793 to resume his duties there. His replacement, Robert Prescott, arrived in May 1796. On 9 July 1796 Carleton sailed from Canada to Britain, never to return.

In retirement Lord Dorchester, as he was now, lived mostly at Greywell Hill, adjoining Nately Scures, in Hampshire. After about 1805 he moved to Stubbings House at Burchett's Green, near Maidenhead, in Berkshire. On 10 November 1808, he died suddenly at Stubbings. He was buried in the parish church of St Swithun's, Nately Scures.

== Honours and legacy ==
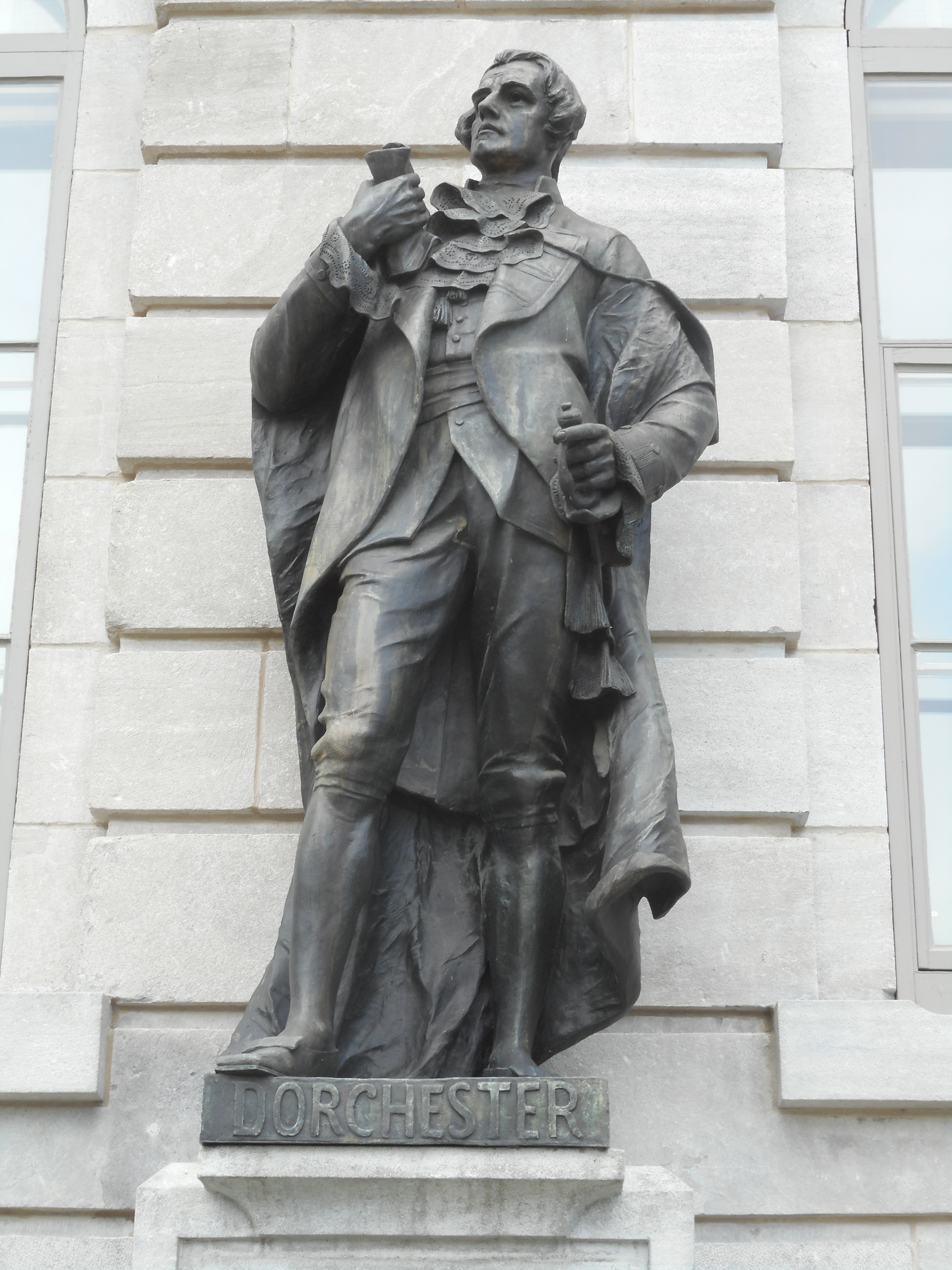
Alfred Laliberté's Guy Carleton, 1st Baron Dorchester sculpture in front of Parliament Building (Quebec)

He was honoured by numerous places and educational institutions named for him:

- HMCS Carleton, a Canadian Forces Naval Reserve Division in Ottawa
- Carleton University in Ottawa
- Dorchester Avenue in Ottawa
- The Carleton, Halifax, Nova Scotia
- Carleton, Nova Scotia
- Carleton Village, Nova Scotia
- Dorchester Road in Niagara Falls, Canada
- Dorchester Boulevard, a major thoroughfare in Montreal since renamed René Lévesque Boulevard
- Dorchester Square in downtown Montreal
- Dorchester Island and the parish and town of Dorchester, all of New Brunswick
- Carleton Street, in:
  - Carlton Street in Downtown Toronto is indirectly named for Carleton via Ann Wood for her brother Guy Carleton Wood of Cornwall, Ontario
  - Saint John, New Brunswick
  - Yarmouth, Nova Scotia
  - Fredericton, New Brunswick
  - St. Andrews, New Brunswick
  - Moosomin, Saskatchewan
- Rue Dorchester, a thoroughfare in Quebec City.
- Old Carleton County Court House, Upper Woodstock, New Brunswick
- Carleton Place, a town in Eastern Ontario
- Carleton County, New Brunswick
- Carleton County, Ontario, that became the Region of Ottawa-Carleton, and then the City of Ottawa through amalgamation in 2001. The name continues in the federal riding of the same name, most famously represented by the Leader of the Opposition Pierre Poilievre from 2004 (originally as Nepean–Carleton until 2015) to his defeat in 2025.
- Carleton-sur-Mer, Quebec, a town on the North Shore of Baie de Chaleurs.
- Guysborough County, Nova Scotia (Guys' borough)
- Guy's Restaurant, in his birthplace of Strabane, is also named after Carleton. The restaurant was formerly known as the Carleton Club.
- Lord Dorchester High School in Dorchester, Ontario
- Sir Guy Carleton Secondary School in Ottawa
- Sir Guy Carleton Elementary School in Vancouver, British Columbia.
- Carleton Island, part of the Thousand Islands, is near the Royal Military College of Canada. The Governor of Upper Canada, John Graves Simcoe, named Wolfe island in General James Wolfe's honour in 1792. The surrounding islands bear the names of Wolfe's generals: Howe, Carleton, Amherst and Gage (now Simcoe). The island was ceded to the Americans in 1794 as part of Jay's Treaty.
- Via Rail Canada has a Manor sleeping car named after Sir Guy Carleton in his honour and there is a plaque inside the railcar explaining his exploits.
- The first railroad in Canada, the Champlain and St. Lawrence Railroad had its first locomotive (a 0-2-0) named "Dorchester".
- Carleton Point, a short-lived Loyalist settlement on Great Abaco Island, Bahamas, was named for him
- The Dorchester Review magazine (est. 2011 at Ottawa) is named in his honour.
- The UELAC Dorchester Award, established in 2007 by Dominion Council exemplifies Volunteer Excellence and Participation, by conferring recognition for lengthy contribution to the United Empire Loyalists’ Association of Canada.
- Before the 1790s, Niagara Falls, Ontario was once called Mount Dorchester in honour of Carleton.

== Arms ==
Coat of arms of Guy Carleton, 1st Baron Dorchester
| Crest A dexter arm embowed at the elbow, holding an arrow proper, the arm naked to the elbow, the shirt folded above it Argent, and the arm beyond it Gules Helm Helm of a peer Escutcheon Ermine on a Bend Sable three Pheons Argent. Supporters Two beavers proper, emblematic of Canada, the dexter gorged with a mural crown, the sinister with a naval crown, both Or, and intended to designate his victories in America by sea and land Motto Quondam His Vicimus Armis (Latin for 'We were once victorious with these arms') Orders Knight of the Order of the Bath: TRIA JUNCTA IN UNO (Latin for 'Three joined in one') Other elements Red Hand of Ulster baronet badge |

== See also ==
- List of lieutenant governors of Quebec
- Commander-in-Chief, North America
- History of Quebec
- History of North America
- Constitutional history of Canada

== Bibliography ==
- Billias, George Athan, Editor, George Washington's Opponents, William Marrow and Company, Inc., New York, 1969, 103–135.
- Browne, G. P. (1983). "Carleton, Guy, 1st Baron Dorchester". In Halpenny, Francess G. (ed.). Dictionary of Canadian Biography. Vol. V (1801–1820) (online ed.). University of Toronto Press.
- Nelson, Paul David. General Sir Guy Carleton, Lord Dorchester: Soldier-Statesman of Early British Canada. Associated University Presses, 2000.
- Reynolds, Paul R., Guy Carleton, A Biography, 1980, ISBN 0-7715-9300-7
- Wrong, George M. Canada and the American Revolution. New York, 1968.

Government offices
| Preceded by James Murray | Governor of the Province of Quebec; 1768–1778 | Succeeded by Sir Frederick Haldimand |
| Preceded by none | Governor-General of the Canadas; 1786–1796 | Succeeded by Robert Prescott |
Military offices
| Preceded by Sir Henry Clinton | Commander-in-Chief, North America; 1782–1783 | Succeeded by John Campbell, of Strachur |
Peerage of Great Britain
| New creation | Baron Dorchester; 1786–1808 | Succeeded by Arthur Carleton, 2nd Baron Dorchester |
