= Baron Dorchester =

Barony in the Peerage of Great Britain

Barony of Dorchester
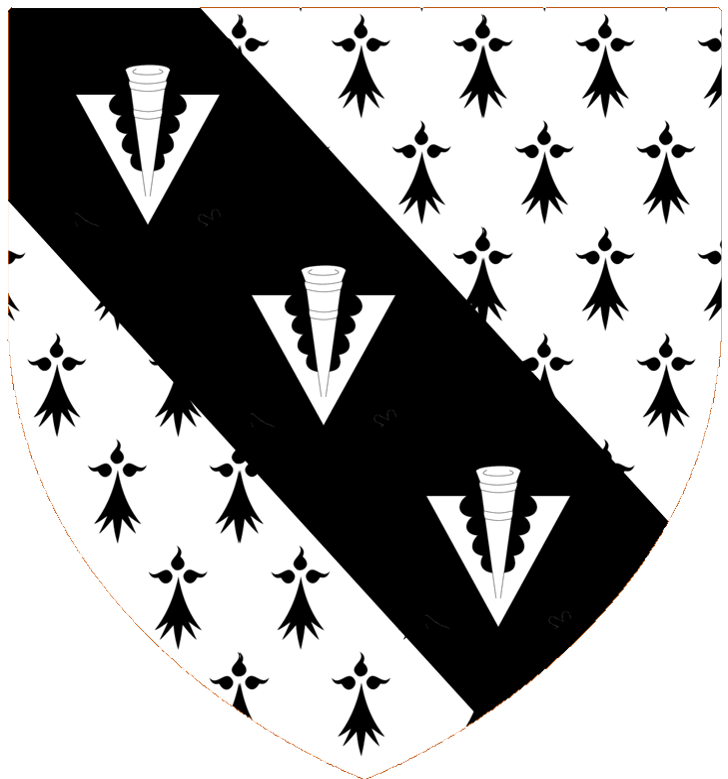
- Arms: Ermine on a Bend Sable three Pheons Argent. Crest: A Dexter Arm embowed and naked to the elbow Shirt folded over the elbow Argent and vested over Gules the hand grasping an Arrow in bend sinister point downwards proper. Supporters: On either side a Beaver proper the dexter gorged with a Mural Coronet and the sinister with a Naval Coronet both Or.
- Creation date: 21 August 1786
- Creation: First
- Created by: George III
- Peerage: Peerage of Great Britain
- First holder: Sir Guy Carleton
- Last holder: Dudley Carleton, 4th Baron Dorchester
- Remainder to: Heirs male of the first Baron's body lawfully begotten
- Extinction date: 30 November 1897
- Motto: Quondam His Vicimus Armis ("We were once victorious with these arms")

Baron Dorchester was a title that was created twice in British history, once in the Peerage of Great Britain and once in the Peerage of the United Kingdom. The first creation came in the Peerage of Great Britain on 21 August 1786 when the soldier and administrator Sir Guy Carleton was made Lord Dorchester, Baron of Dorchester, in the County of Oxford. He was succeeded by his grandson, the second Baron. He was the only son of the Hon. Christopher Carleton, third son of the first Baron. The second Baron died unmarried at an early age and was succeeded by his first cousin, the third Baron. He was the only son of the Hon. George Carleton, fourth son of the first Baron. He had no sons and was succeeded by his first cousin, the fourth Baron. He was the only son of the Reverend and Hon. Richard Carleton, seventh son of the first Baron. The fourth Baron was a Colonel in the Coldstream Guards. He was childless, and the title became extinct upon his death on 30 November 1897.

The title was revived on 2 August 1899 when the Honourable Henrietta Anne Carleton was made Baroness Dorchester, of Dorchester, in the County of Oxford, in the Peerage of the United Kingdom. She was the elder daughter of the third Baron of the first creation. She was the wife of, firstly, Francis Paynton Pigott and, secondly, of Major-General Richard Langford Leir. In 1899, she assumed by Royal licence the surname of Carleton. She was succeeded by her son from her first marriage, the second Baron. He was a soldier and fought in the Second Boer War and the First World War. He had two daughters but no sons, and on his death in 1963, the title became extinct for the second time.

As indicated by the territorial designations, the titles referred to Dorchester in Oxfordshire (also known as Dorchester-on-Thames) and not to the more famous Dorchester, county town of Dorset.

== Barons Dorchester; first creation (1786) ==
- Guy Carleton, 1st Baron Dorchester (1724–1808)
  - The Hon. Christopher Carleton (1775–1806)
- Arthur Henry Carleton, 2nd Baron Dorchester (1805–1826)
- Guy Carleton, 3rd Baron Dorchester (1811–1875)
- Dudley Wilmot Carleton, 4th Baron Dorchester (1822–1897)

== Barons Dorchester; second creation (1899) ==
- Henrietta Anne Carleton, 1st Baroness Dorchester (1846–1925)
- Dudley Massey Pigott Carleton, 2nd Baron Dorchester (1876–1963)

== Family tree ==
Guy Carleton, 1st Baron Dorchester; 1724–1808
Hon. Christopher Carleton; 1775–1806	Hon. George Carleton; 1781–1814	Hon. Richard Carleton; 1792–1860
Arthur Carleton, 2nd Baron Dorchester; 1805–1826	Guy Carleton, 3rd Baron Dorchester; 1811–1875	Dudley Carleton, 4th Baron Dorchester; 1822–1897
Henrietta Carleton, 1st Baroness Dorchester; 1846–1925
Dudley Carleton, 2nd Baron Dorchester; 1876–1963

== See also ==
- Marquess of Dorchester
- Earl of Dorchester
- Viscount Dorchester
