= 2014–15 EOJHL season =

- League: Eastern Ontario Junior Hockey League
- Sport: Hockey
- Duration: Regular season 2014-09-01 / 2015-02-15; Playoffs; 2015-02-11 – 2014-04-15
- Number of teams: 22
- Finals champions: Casselman Vikings

EOJHL seasons
- ← 2013–14 2015–16 →

The 2014–15 EOJHL season was the 48th season of the Eastern Ontario Junior Hockey League (EOJHL). The twenty two teams of the EOJHL played between 40 and 44 game schedules.

In February, the league's top teams competed for the D. Arnold Carson Memorial Trophy, which is awarded for the EOJHL championship.

== Final standings ==
Note: GP = Games played; W = Wins; L = Losses; OTL = Overtime losses; SL = Shootout losses; GF = Goals for; GA = Goals against; PTS = Points; x = clinched playoff berth; y = clinched division title.

Rideau division
Team	Centre	GP	W	L	OTL	SOL	GF	GA	Points
xy-Prescott Flyers	Prescott, Ontario	44	33	7	0	4	164	111	70
x-Brockville Tikis	Brockville, Ontario	44	20	20	2	2	132	159	44
x-Athens Aeros	Athens, Ontario	44	17	20	3	4	141	144	41
x-Westport Rideaus	Westport, Ontario	44	19	24	0	2	169	176	39
Gananoque Islanders	Gananoque, Ontario	44	17	24	1	2	121	175	37
St-Lawrence Division
Team	Centre	GP	W	L	OTL	SOL	GF	GA	Points
xy-Casselman Vikings	Casselman, Ontario	40	34	4	1	1	233	105	70
x-Alexandria Glens	Alexandria, Ontario	40	23	14	0	3	179	171	49
x-Winchester Hawks	Winchester, Ontario	40	23	14	2	1	192	164	49
x-Char-Lan Rebels	Williamstown, Ontario	40	19	20	0	1	171	176	39
Akwesasne Wolves	Akwesasne, Ontario	39	13	21	4	1	110	162	31
Morrisburg Lions	Morrisburg, Ontario	39	11	25	1	2	146	215	25
Metro division
Team	Centre	GP	W	L	OTL	SOL	GF	GA	Points
xy-Ottawa West Golden Knights	Ottawa, Ontario	40	23	16	1	0	159	155	47
x-Gatineau Mustangs	Buckingham, Quebec	40	23	16	1	0	186	159	47
x-Clarence Beavers	Clarence Creek, Ontario	40	20	16	1	3	154	141	44
x-Metcalfe Jets	Metcalfe, Ontario	40	18	18	1	3	154	155	40
Ottawa Canadians	Ottawa, Ontario	40	17	19	1	3	131	150	38
Valley division
Team	Centre	GP	W	L	OTL	SOL	GF	GA	Points
xy-Renfrew Timberwolves	Renfrew, Ontario	40	27	9	1	3	183	144	58
x-Stittsville Rams	Stittsville, Ontario	40	27	12	0	1	202	134	55
x-Arnprior Packers	Arnprior, Ontario	40	23	16	1	0	170	154	47
x-Shawville Pontiacs	Shawville, Quebec	40	21	15	2	2	189	142	46
Almonte Thunder	Almonte, Ontario	40	11	27	1	1	121	217	24
Perth Blue Wings	Perth, Ontario	40	10	30	0	0	108	206	20

Teams listed on the official league website.

== 2015 D. Arnold Carson Memorial Trophy play-offs ==
=== League Playdowns ===
Division Semi-finals	Division Finals
R1	Prescott	4
R4	Westport	2
R1	Prescott	4
R2	Brockville	2
R2	Brockville	4
R3	Athens	0
Rideau/St. Lawrence
SL1	Casselman	4
SL4	Char-Lan	2
SL1	Casselman	4
SL3	Winchester	1
SL2	Alexandria	2
SL3	Winchester	4
M1	Ottawa West	4
M4	Metcalfe	0
M1	Ottawa West	2
M2	Gatineau	4
M2	Gatineau	4
M3	Clarence	0
Metro/Valley
V1	Renfrew	4
V4	Shawville	2
V1	Renfrew	0
V2	Stittsville	4
V2	Stittsville	4
V3	Arnprior	3

Conference Finals
R	Prescott	0
SL	Casselman	4
M2	Gatineau	2
V2	Stittsville	4

Carson Memorial Trophy Finals
R/SL	Casselman	4
M/V	Stittsville	2

== Trophies and awards ==
D. Arnold Carson Memorial Trophy awarded to the EOJHL Playoff Champions:
John Shorey Cup awarded to Rideau/St. Lawrence Conference Playoff Champions:
Dwaine Barkley Trophy awarded to Metro/Valley Conference Playoff Champions:
Gill Trophy awarded to Rideau Division Playoff Champions:
Alex English Trophy awarded to St. Lawrence Division Playoff Champions:
Ottawa Nepean Sportsplex Trophy awarded to Metro Division Playoff Champions:
Carl Foley Trophy Awarded to Valley Division Playoff Champions:

== Scoring leaders ==
=== Rideau/St-Lawrence Scoring Leaders ===
Note: GP = Games played; G = Goals; A = Assists; Pts = Points; PIM = Penalty minutes

Player	Team	GP	G	A	Pts	PIM
Nicolas Brazeau	Casselman Vikings	38	33	44	77	28
Taylor Widenmaier	Casselman Vikings	39	35	30	65	18
Maxime Choquette	Casselman Vikings	39	30	35	65	70
Bradley Gabbour	Alexandria Glens	35	33	31	64	12
Ron Harrison	Prescott Flyers	44	16	48	64	44

=== Metro/Valley scoring leaders ===
Note: GP = Games played; G = Goals; A = Assists; Pts = Points; PIM = Penalty minutes

Player	Team	GP	G	A	Pts	PIM
Vincent Proulx	Gatineau Mustangs	38	37	49	86	32
Scott Conroy	Renfrew Timberwolves	40	32	43	75	17
Lucas Gonu	Renfrew Timberwolves	39	37	29	66	52
Luc Deschamps	Arnprior Packers	36	26	40	66	26
Shane Hiley	Stittsville Rams	34	32	33	65	60
