= 2013–14 EOJHL season =

- League: Eastern Ontario Junior Hockey League
- Sport: Ice hockey
- Number of teams: 22

EOJHL seasons
- ← 2012–13 2014–15 →

The 2013–14 EOJHL season is the 47th season of the Eastern Ontario Junior Hockey League (EOJHL). The twenty two teams of the EOJHL will play between 40 and 45-game schedules.

Come February, the top teams of the league will play down for the D. Arnold Carson Memorial Trophy, the EOJHL championship.

== Regular season standings ==
Note: GP = Games played; W = Wins; L = Losses; OTL = Overtime losses; SL = Shootout losses; GF = Goals for; GA = Goals against; PTS = Points; x = clinched playoff berth; y = clinched division title.

Rideau division
Team	Centre	GP	W	L	OTL	SOL	GF	GA	Points
xyGananoque Islanders	Gananoque, Ontario	45	28	14	1	2	168	137	59
x-Prescott Flyers	Prescott, Ontario	45	26	19	0	0	159	172	52
x-Athens Aeros	Athens, Ontario	45	21	18	3	3	169	170	48
x-Westport Rideaus	Westport, Ontario	45	17	20	6	2	143	160	42
Brockville Tikis	Brockville, Ontario	45	14	26	4	1	140	171	33
St-Lawrence Division
Team	Centre	GP	W	L	OTL	SOL	GF	GA	Points
xy-Casselman Vikings	Casselman, Ontario	41	35	2	2	2	231	96	74
x-Char-Lan Rebels	Williamstown, Ontario	41	22	14	1	4	176	162	49
x-Winchester Hawks	Winchester, Ontario	41	23	16	0	2	160	177	48
x-Akwesasne Wolves	Akwesasne, Ontario	41	22	18	1	0	145	139	45
Alexandria Glens	Alexandria, Ontario	41	19	16	5	1	169	189	44
Morrisburg Lions	Morrisburg, Ontario	41	7	32	1	1	124	220	16
Metro division
Team	Centre	GP	W	L	OTL	SOL	GF	GA	Points
xy-Ottawa West Golden Knights	Ottawa, Ontario	41	28	12	0	1	167	135	57
x-Ottawa Canadians	Ottawa, Ontario	41	25	12	1	3	162	131	54
x-Clarence Beavers	Clarence Creek, Ontario	41	25	14	1	1	144	140	52
x-Gatineau Mustangs	Buckingham, Quebec	41	21	15	3	2	180	166	47
Metcalfe Jets	Metcalfe, Ontario	41	15	26	0	0	119	159	30
Valley division
Team	Centre	GP	W	L	OTL	SOL	GF	GA	Points
xy-Renfrew Timberwolves	Renfrew, Ontario	41	24	13	1	3	181	151	52
x-Almonte Thunder	Almonte, Ontario	41	18	16	2	5	149	171	43
x-Arnprior Packers	Arnprior, Ontario	41	19	19	2	1	133	156	41
x-Shawville Pontiacs	Shawville, Quebec	41	18	18	4	1	179	168	41
Stittsville Royals	Stittsville, Ontario	41	18	18	3	2	137	156	40
Perth Blue Wings	Perth, Ontario	41	16	17	2	6	156	165	40

Teams listed on the official league website.

== 2014 D. Arnold Carson Memorial Trophy Playoffs ==
=== League Playdowns ===
Division Semi-finals	Division Finals
R1	Gananoque Islanders	4
R4	Westport Rideaus	3
R1	Gananoque Islanders	4
R2	Prescott Flyers	1
R2	Prescott Flyers	4
R3	Athens Aeros	2
Rideau/St. Lawrence
SL1	Casselman Vikings	4
SL4	Akwesasne Wolves	0
SL1	Casselman Vikings	4
SL2	Winchester Hawks	1
SL2	Char-Lan Rebels	0
SL3	Winchester Hawks	4
M1	Ottawa West Golden Knights	4
M4	Gatineau Mustangs	3
M1	Ottawa West Golden Knights	4
M2	Ottawa Canadians	2
M2	Ottawa Canadians	4
M3	Clarence Beavers	1
Metro/Valley
V1	Renfrew Timberwolves	4
V4	Shawville Pontiacs	2
V1	Renfrew Timberwolves	1
V2	Almonte Thunder	4
V2	Almonte Thunder	4
V3	Arnprior Packers	2

Conference Finals
R	Gananoque Islanders	0
SL	Casselman Vikings	4
M	Ottawa West Golden Knights	4
V	Almonte Thunder	2

Carson Memorial Trophy Finals
R/SL	Casselman Vikings	4
M/V	Ottawa West Golden Knights	3

== Don Johnson Memorial Cup ==
Winner of the EOJHL went on to Port Hawkesbury, Nova Scotia to play in the Eastern Canada Junior B Championship Played in Port Hawkesbury, Nova Scotia, hosted by the Strait Pirates.

On April 22, 2014, the Casselman Vikings of the Eastern Ontario Junior Hockey League played in Port Hawkesbury, Nova Scotia and became the first non-Atlantic Canada team to compete at the event. The Vikings would defeat the Fredericton Jr. Caps 6–1 in their debut. The 2014 tournament would also mark the tournament being rebranded from the Atlantic Junior B Championships to the Eastern Canadian Junior B Championships. The Vikings would sweep the event with six wins and no losses. The rebranding did not last long. The 2015 championship was slated to take place in Arnprior, Ontario, the first to take place outside of Atlantic Canada, but since it has been re-awarded to Tyne Valley, Prince Edward Island.

Don Johnson Cup Round Robin
Rank	Team	League	W-L-OTL	GF	GA
1	(Ontario) x-Casselman Vikings	EOJHL	4–0–0	27	9
2	(Nova Scotia) x-Sackville Blazers	NSJHL	3–1–0	26	18
3	(Prince Edward Island) x-Kensington Vipers	IJHL	3–1–0	19	14
4	(New Brunswick) x-Fredericton Caps	NBJHL	1–3–0	13	18
5	(Newfoundland and Labrador) Avalon Jr. Capitals	SJJHL	1–3–0	12	24
6	(Nova Scotia) Strait Pirates	Host	0–2–2	12	26

=== Round Robin ===
Round Robin
Game	Away	Score	Home	Score
April 22, 2014
1	Kensington	6	Sackville	8
2	Fredericton	1	Casselman	6
3	Avalon	5	Strait	4 SO
April 23, 2014
4	Casselman	7	Sackville	5
5	Avalon	2	Kensington	6
6	Fredericton	9	Strait	4
April 24, 2014
7	Avalon	2	Casselman	6
8	Fredericton	2	Sackville	5
9	Kensington	4	Strait	3 OT
April 25, 2014
10	Avalon	3	Sackville	8
11	Fredericton	1	Kensington	3
12	Casselman	8	Strait	1

=== Championship round ===
Championship Round
Game	Away	Score	Home	Score
April 26, 2014
SF	Fredericton	2	Casselman	4
SF	Kensington	5	Sackville	6 OT
April 27, 2014
F	Sackville	2	Casselman	3 OT

== Trophies and awards ==
D. Arnold Carson Memorial Trophy Awarded to the EOJHL Playoff Champions:
John Shorey Cup Awarded to Rideau/St. Lawrence Conference Playoff Champions:
Dwaine Barkley Trophy Awarded to Metro/Valley Conference Playoff Champions:
Gill Trophy Awarded to Rideau Division Playoff Champions:
Alex English Trophy Awarded to St. Lawrence Division Playoff Champions:
Ottawa Nepean Sportsplex Trophy Awarded to Metro Division Playoff Champions:
Carl Foley Trophy Awarded to Valley Division Playoff Champions:
