= Jimmy Howard =

American ice hockey player (born 1984)

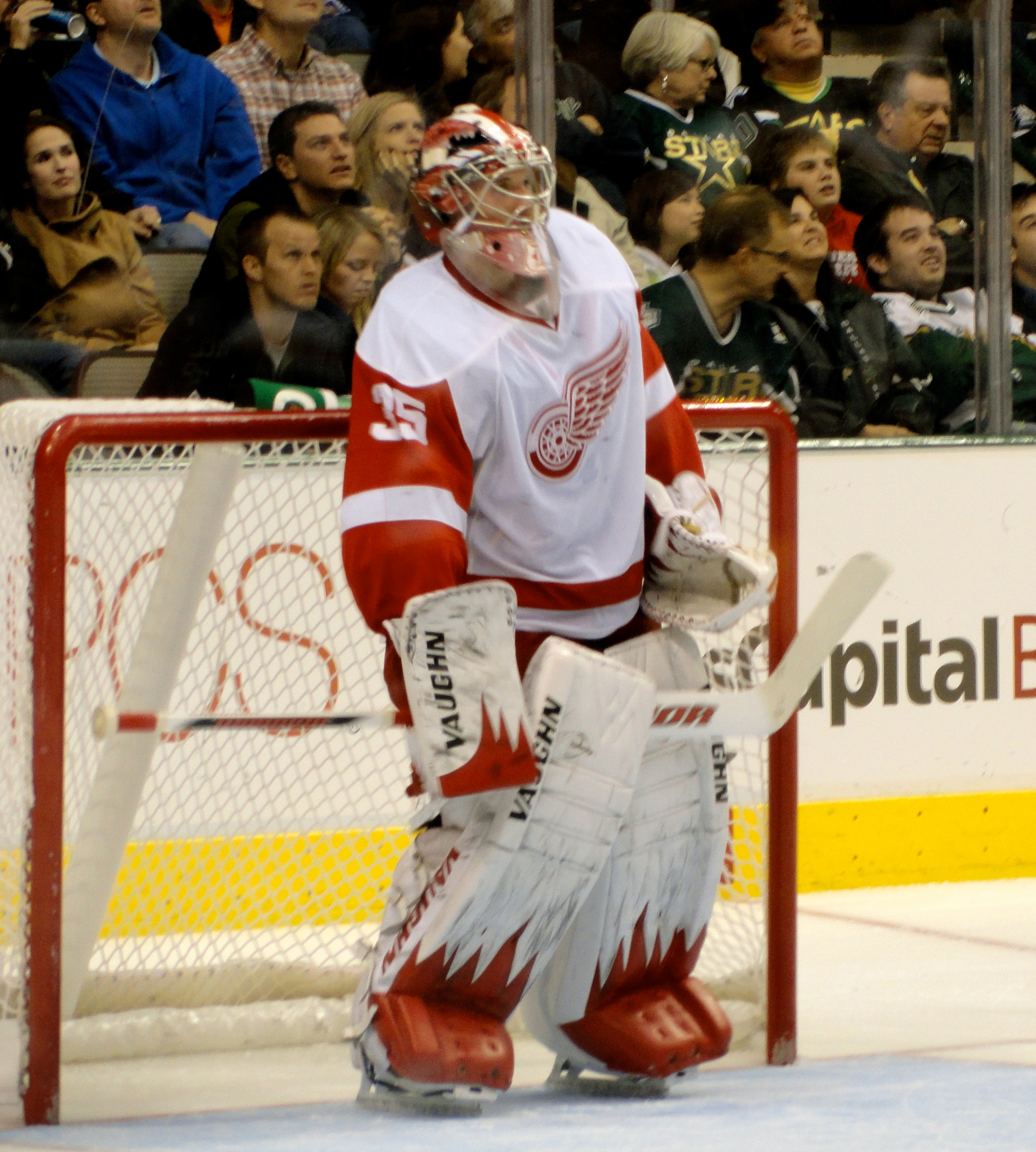
- Howard with the Detroit Red Wings in 2010
- Born: March 26, 1984 (age 42) Ogdensburg, New York, U.S.
- Height: 6 ft 1 in (185 cm)
- Weight: 218 lb (99 kg; 15 st 8 lb)
- Position: Goaltender
- Caught: Left
- Played for: Detroit Red Wings
- National team: United States
- NHL draft: 64th overall, 2003; Detroit Red Wings
- Playing career: 2005–2020

James Russell Howard III (born March 26, 1984) is an American former professional ice hockey goaltender, was a Detroit Red Wings studio analyst for Bally Sports Detroit, and was hired in June of 2026 as the goalie coach for the Detroit Clutch of the PWHL. He spent his entire National Hockey League (NHL) career with the Detroit Red Wings, by whom he was drafted in 2003.

== Playing career ==
=== Junior ===
Howard began his junior career playing for the Westport Rideaus of the Eastern Ontario Junior Hockey League, where he played from ages 14–16 before joining the U.S. National Team Development Program. He played with the U.S. National Under-17 and U.S. National Under-18 teams during the 2001–02 season, playing 9 games with the Under-17 team and 26 games with the Under-18 team for a total record of 22–11–1 with four shutouts and was subsequently named USA Goaltender of the year. Howard then attended the University of Maine and played for their men's ice hockey team, the Maine Black Bears, for three seasons. While at UMaine, Howard led the Black Bears to the 2003–04 Frozen Four championship game, losing 1–0 to the University of Denver. While Howard was playing for the Black Bears, he was drafted in the 2nd round of the 2003 NHL entry draft by the Detroit Red Wings on June 21, 2003. During the 2003–04 season he set the NCAA record for GAA (1.19) and save percentage (.956). A record he held until being surpassed by Yaniv Perets (1.17) in 2022.

=== Professional ===
Beginning with the 2005–06 season, Howard began his career in the AHL with the Grand Rapids Griffins where he was occasionally called up to play for the Detroit Red Wings of the National Hockey League. He became the only NHL goalie to face a penalty shot in each of his first two games. Howard's inaugural season in the AHL became what is still one of his best in professional ice hockey. During this season he set many personal records as well as franchise records, including being the first Griffin named to the AHL's All-Rookie Team and helping establish the Griffins franchise win streak record of 12.

He was in net for the Red Wings four times in the 2005–06 season posting a 1–2–0 record, a GAA of 2.99 and a save percentage of .904. In the 2007–08 season during the month of February, Howard was in net for the Red Wings an additional four times, and called up once during the 2008–09 season, bringing his total NHL games played to 9.

Howard only played four games in the 2007–08 regular season and therefore did not qualify to have his name engraved on the cup. However, he was included in the 2008 Detroit Red Wings Stanley Cup picture, and given the Cup for a day. With the retirement of Red Wings goaltender Dominik Hašek in June 2008, Howard was expected to compete with Ty Conklin for the position of backup goaltender to veteran Chris Osgood for the 2008–09 NHL season, despite Conklin's noticeable advantages in terms of experience and contract. Although Howard did not earn a permanent spot on the Red Wings roster for the 2008–09 season, he was expected to make the roster in the near future.

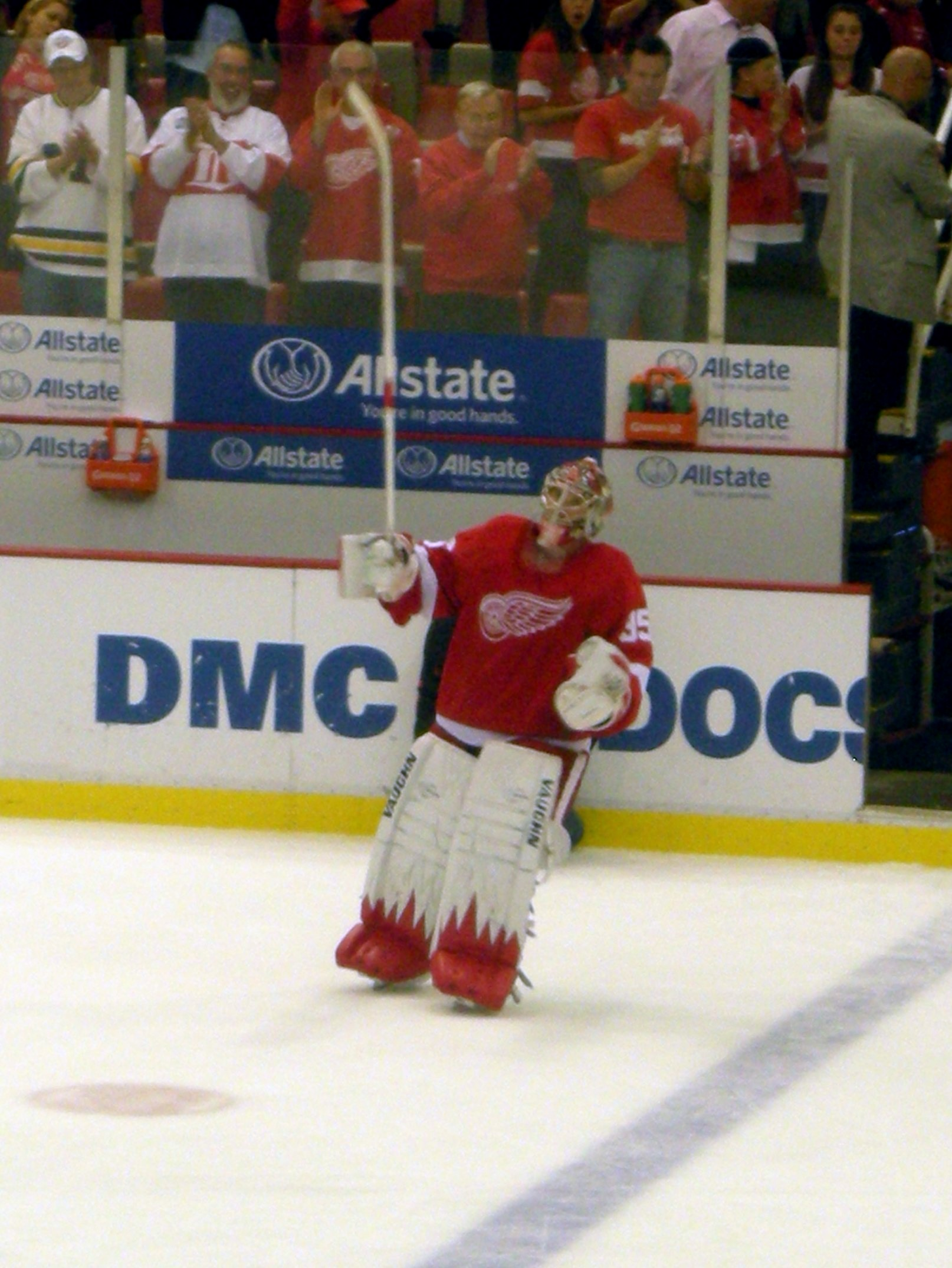
Howard at Joe Louis Arena on October 8, 2010

Howard's roster spot turned official during 2009 off-season when Detroit did not offer Conklin a new contract, instead electing to promote Howard to Osgood's full-time backup. He recorded his first win of the 2009–10 season on October 27 in relief of Osgood against the Vancouver Canucks, making 20 saves. On December 17, 2009, Howard recorded his first career shutout in a 3–0 win over the Tampa Bay Lightning. Howard unexpectedly won the starting position mid-season after Osgood continued to struggle in regular season play as he did the season before, much earlier then expected, and managed to stabilize the net for the Red Wings. Howard finished the 2009–10 season with excellent stats, ranking him in the top 5 in GAA and Save %, and finishing with a 37–15–10 record and a nomination for the Calder Trophy for Rookie of the Year. Howard gained more fame in the March 22, 2010 game against the Pittsburgh Penguins when he grabbed Sidney Crosby from behind and put his glove in Crosby's face, after Crosby repeatedly cross-checked Howard's teammate Henrik Zetterberg.

On April 14, 2010, Howard played in his first NHL playoff game, a 3–2 loss to the Phoenix Coyotes. On April 20, he recorded his first career playoff shutout, making 29 saves in a 3–0 win over the Coyotes. The Coyotes were eliminated by the Red Wings when Howard's first NHL playoff series went to seven games. The Detroit Red Wings were then eliminated by the San Jose Sharks in five games. Howard recorded a 2.75 goals against average with a .915 save percentage during the postseason. Howard was also a 2010 Calder Memorial Trophy finalist, but was runner-up to Buffalo's Tyler Myers. Howard won the 2010 Detroit Red Wings-Detroit Sports Broadcasters Association Rookie of the Year Award.

Howard recorded a 21 save shutout in Detroit's season opener against the Anaheim Ducks to kick off the 2010–11 NHL season. On February 28, 2011, Howard signed a two-year contract extension with the Red Wings worth $2.25 million per season. The Red Wings managed to sweep the Coyotes in rematch of last year's series, but lost, in a rematch again, in seven games to the San Jose Sharks in the 2nd round of the playoffs, despite coming back this time from a 3-0 deficit to force a Game 7.

On January 23, 2012, in the Red Wings' 49th game, Howard recorded his 30th win of the season, before the All-Star break. The win was Detroit's 17th consecutive home victory and kept them in first place in the standings. Howard would win only five more games after the All-Star break, because of a broken finger on his stick hand suffered on February 3, 2012, that made him miss eight games, and a reoccurring groin injury later in the season that scratched him in seven other games.

During the lockout-shortened 2012–13 NHL season, Howard recorded a 21–13–7 record as the Red Wings eventually clinched their 22nd consecutive playoff berth. On April 16, 2013, Howard signed a six-year, $31.8 million contract extension with the Red Wings.

During the 2014–15 NHL season, Howard recorded a 16–7–7 record, with a 2.11 GAA and a .921 save percentage prior to the All-Star break. Howard was named to the NHL All-Star Game, however he was unable to participate due to suffering a groin tear on January 10, in a game against the Washington Capitals, and missed five weeks of the season. Following his return from his injury, Howard struggled, recording a 7–6–4 record, with 2.99 GAA and a .896 save percentage, and was eventually benched for youngster Petr Mrazek.

On April 6, 2016, Howard recorded his 22nd shutout victory as a Red Wing against the Philadelphia Flyers in a 3–0 game at Joe Louis Arena moving him to fourth in franchise history.

On December 20, 2016, Howard acquired a right knee sprain. Opposing starting goalkeeper Ben Bishop was also injured during the game. Howard was assigned to the AHL Grand Rapids Griffins on February 4, 2017 for a conditioning assignment, but was eventually called back up to the NHL. Ultimately, Howard played in 26 NHL games, going 10–11–1 with a 2.10 GAA, and a .927 SV%, and in 4 AHL games, going 3–1 with a 2.11 GAA, and a .920 SV%

On October 5, 2017, Howard recorded his 200th career NHL win in a victory over the Minnesota Wild in the season opening game at Little Caesars Arena. On February 14, 2019, Howard appeared in his 500th career NHL game, becoming the third Red Wings goalie to reach the milestone, following Terry Sawchuk and Chris Osgood. He also became the 71st in NHL history and eighth American-born goalie to reach the milestone. On March 20, the Red Wings signed Howard to a one-year contract extension.

The Red Wings did not re-sign Howard for the 2020–21 season. Howard retired in January 2021.

== Post-playing career ==
In September 2022, Howard became Red Wings studio analyst for Bally Sports Detroit during the 2022–23 season.

== International play ==
Medal record

Representing United States

Men's ice hockey

World U18 Championships
| Gold medal – first place | 2002 Slovakia | |

In April 2002, Howard was first selected to play for the United States in the 2002 IIHF World U18 Championships in Slovakia. Playing in six tournament games, he led his team to a gold medal. He made his Senior international debut representing the United States at the 2012 World Championships, collecting five wins in seven games despite finishing in 7th place.

Howard was named to the Team USA squad for the 2014 Winter Olympics, as the country's third choice goaltender. He did not feature in a game throughout the tournament.

Howard represented the United States at the 2017 World Championships, where he posted a 4–2 record, with a 1.86 GAA.

== Records ==
- Holds University of Maine school record for shutouts, goals against average and save percentage (single season and career).
- Was awarded a Legislative Sentiment by former Maine State Representative Chris Greeley in July 2011, for his success as both a college and professional hockey player, and his work with kids' hockey programs.

== Personal life ==
He is married to Rachel Howard, and has three sons and a daughter.

== Career statistics ==
=== Regular season and playoffs ===
| | | | Regular season | | | | | | | | | | Playoffs |
| Season | Team | League | GP | W | L | T | OTL | MIN | GA | SO | GAA | SV% | GP | W | L | MIN | GA | SO | GAA | SV% |
|---|---|---|---|---|---|---|---|---|---|---|---|---|---|---|---|---|---|---|---|---|
| 1999–00 | Westport Rideaus | EOJHL | 22 | — | — | — | — | — | — | — | 2.66 | — | — | — | — | — | — | — | — | — |
| 2000–01 | Kanata Valley Lasers | CJHL | 25 | — | — | — | — | — | — | — | 3.69 | — | — | — | — | — | — | — | — | — |
| 2001–02 | US NTDP Juniors | USHL | 8 | 4 | 3 | 0 | — | 425 | 14 | 0 | 1.98 | .927 | — | — | — | — | — | — | — | — |
| 2001–02 | US NTDP U18 | NAHL | 8 | 3 | 4 | 0 | — | 381 | 25 | 0 | 3.93 | — | — | — | — | — | — | — | — | — |
| 2001–02 | US NTDP U18 | USDP | 19 | 15 | 4 | 1 | — | 1170 | 37 | 4 | 1.90 | — | — | — | — | — | — | — | — | — |
| 2002–03 | University of Maine | HE | 21 | 14 | 6 | 0 | — | 1,151 | 47 | 3 | 2.45 | .916 | — | — | — | — | — | — | — | — |
| 2003–04 | University of Maine | HE | 22 | 14 | 4 | 3 | — | 1,364 | 27 | 6 | 1.19 | .956 | — | — | — | — | — | — | — | — |
| 2004–05 | University of Maine | HE | 39 | 19 | 13 | 7 | — | 2,310 | 74 | 6 | 1.92 | .924 | — | — | — | — | — | — | — | — |
| 2005–06 | Grand Rapids Griffins | AHL | 38 | 27 | 6 | — | 2 | 2,141 | 92 | 2 | 2.58 | .910 | 14 | 6 | 7 | 763 | 44 | 0 | 3.46 | .885 |
| 2005–06 | Detroit Red Wings | NHL | 4 | 1 | 2 | — | 0 | 200 | 10 | 0 | 2.98 | .904 | — | — | — | — | — | — | — | — |
| 2006–07 | Grand Rapids Griffins | AHL | 49 | 21 | 21 | — | 3 | 2,776 | 125 | 6 | 2.70 | .911 | 7 | 3 | 4 | 434 | 14 | 0 | 1.93 | .927 |
| 2007–08 | Grand Rapids Griffins | AHL | 54 | 21 | 28 | — | 2 | 3,097 | 146 | 2 | 2.83 | .907 | — | — | — | — | — | — | — | — |
| 2007–08 | Detroit Red Wings | NHL | 4 | 0 | 2 | — | 0 | 197 | 7 | 0 | 2.13 | .926 | — | — | — | — | — | — | — | — |
| 2008–09 | Grand Rapids Griffins | AHL | 45 | 21 | 18 | — | 4 | 2,644 | 112 | 4 | 2.54 | .916 | 10 | 4 | 6 | 598 | 24 | 0 | 2.41 | .900 |
| 2008–09 | Detroit Red Wings | NHL | 1 | 0 | 1 | — | 0 | 59 | 4 | 0 | 4.10 | .857 | — | — | — | — | — | — | — | — |
| 2009–10 | Detroit Red Wings | NHL | 63 | 37 | 15 | — | 10 | 3,740 | 141 | 3 | 2.26 | .924 | 12 | 5 | 7 | 720 | 33 | 1 | 2.75 | .915 |
| 2010–11 | Detroit Red Wings | NHL | 63 | 37 | 17 | — | 5 | 3,615 | 168 | 2 | 2.79 | .908 | 11 | 7 | 4 | 673 | 28 | 0 | 2.50 | .923 |
| 2011–12 | Detroit Red Wings | NHL | 57 | 35 | 17 | — | 4 | 3,360 | 119 | 6 | 2.13 | .920 | 5 | 1 | 4 | 295 | 13 | 0 | 2.64 | .888 |
| 2012–13 | Detroit Red Wings | NHL | 42 | 21 | 13 | — | 7 | 2,446 | 87 | 5 | 2.13 | .923 | 14 | 7 | 7 | 859 | 35 | 1 | 2.44 | .924 |
| 2013–14 | Detroit Red Wings | NHL | 51 | 21 | 19 | — | 11 | 3,004 | 133 | 2 | 2.66 | .910 | 3 | 1 | 2 | 178 | 6 | 1 | 2.02 | .931 |
| 2014–15 | Detroit Red Wings | NHL | 53 | 23 | 13 | — | 11 | 2,971 | 121 | 2 | 2.44 | .910 | 1 | 0 | 0 | 20 | 1 | 0 | 3.00 | .917 |
| 2015–16 | Detroit Red Wings | NHL | 37 | 14 | 14 | — | 5 | 1,974 | 92 | 2 | 2.80 | .906 | 2 | 0 | 2 | 118 | 7 | 0 | 3.59 | .891 |
| 2016–17 | Detroit Red Wings | NHL | 26 | 10 | 11 | — | 1 | 1,397 | 49 | 1 | 2.10 | .927 | — | — | — | — | — | — | — | — |
| 2016–17 | Grand Rapids Griffins | AHL | 4 | 3 | 1 | — | 0 | 227 | 8 | 1 | 2.11 | .920 | — | — | — | — | — | — | — | — |
| 2017–18 | Detroit Red Wings | NHL | 60 | 22 | 27 | — | 9 | 3,368 | 160 | 1 | 2.85 | .910 | — | — | — | — | — | — | — | — |
| 2018–19 | Detroit Red Wings | NHL | 55 | 23 | 22 | — | 5 | 3,053 | 156 | 0 | 3.07 | .909 | — | — | — | — | — | — | — | — |
| 2019–20 | Detroit Red Wings | NHL | 27 | 2 | 23 | — | 2 | 1,372 | 96 | 0 | 4.20 | .882 | — | — | — | — | — | — | — | — |
| 2019–20 | Grand Rapids Griffins | AHL | 2 | 1 | 1 | — | 0 | 124 | 5 | 0 | 2.42 | .917 | — | — | — | — | — | — | — | — |
| NHL totals | | | 543 | 246 | 196 | — | 70 | 30,755 | 1,343 | 24 | 2.62 | .912 | 48 | 21 | 26 | 2,864 | 123 | 3 | 2.58 | .918 |

=== International ===
| Year | Team | Event | Result | GP | W | L | T | MIN | GA | SO | GAA | SV% |
|---|---|---|---|---|---|---|---|---|---|---|---|---|
| 2002 | United States | WJC18 | 1st place, gold medalist(s) | 6 | | | | 360 | 8 | 1 | 1.33 | .954 |
| 2003 | United States | WJC | 4th | 3 | 0 | 1 | 0 | 79 | 8 | 0 | 6.08 | .800 |
| 2012 | United States | WC | 7th | 7 | 5 | 2 | — | 421 | 17 | 1 | 2.42 | .911 |
| 2014 | United States | OG | 4th | — | — | — | — | — | — | — | — | — |
| 2017 | United States | WC | 5th | 6 | 4 | 2 | — | 355 | 11 | 1 | 1.86 | .920 |
| Junior totals | | | | 9 | — | — | — | 439 | 16 | 1 | 2.19 | — |
| Senior totals | | | | 13 | 9 | 4 | — | 776 | 28 | 2 | 2.16 | .915 |

== Awards and honors ==
| Award | Year |
College
| HE All-Rookie Team | 2003 |
| HE Rookie of the Year | 2003 |
| HE First All-Star Team | 2004 |
| AHCA East Second All-American Team | 2004 |
| Hockey East All-Tournament Team | 2004 |
| Tournament MVP | 2004 |
| HE Goaltender of the Year | 2004 |
AHL
| AHL All-Rookie Team | 2006 |
| AHL All-Star Game | 2008 |
NHL
| NHL All-Rookie Team | 2010 |
| NHL All-Star Game | 2012, 2015*, 2019 |
International
| World Championship Top 3 player on Team | 2012 |

*injured, did not play

Awards and achievements
| Preceded by Sean Collins | Hockey East Rookie of the Year; 2002–03 | Succeeded by Michel Léveillé |
| Preceded by Sean Fields | William Flynn Tournament Most Valuable Player; 2004 | Succeeded by Brian Boyle |
| Preceded by Matti Kaltiainen | Hockey East Goaltending Champion; 2003–04 | Succeeded by Matti Kaltiainen |
