= Andy Sutton =

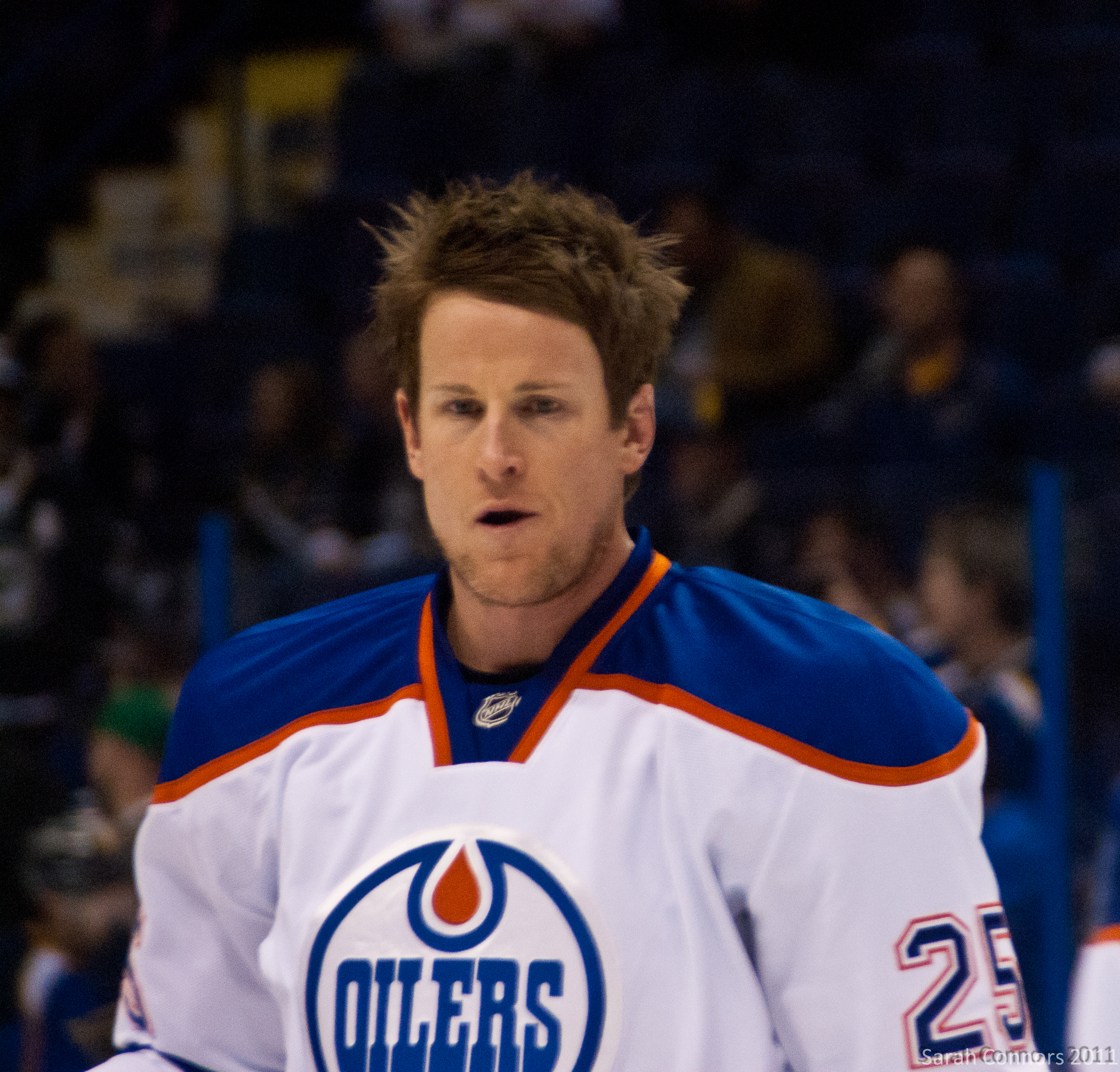
- Sutton with the Oilers in 2012
- Born: March 10, 1975 (age 51) London, Ontario, Canada
- Height: 6 ft 6 in (198 cm)
- Weight: 245 lb (111 kg; 17 st 7 lb)
- Position: Defence
- Shot: Left
- Played for: San Jose Sharks; Minnesota Wild; Atlanta Thrashers; New York Islanders; Ottawa Senators; Anaheim Ducks; Edmonton Oilers
- NHL draft: Undrafted
- Playing career: 1998–2012

Andrew Cameron Sutton (born March 10, 1975) is a Canadian former professional ice hockey defenceman. He has previously played in the National Hockey League (NHL) with the Edmonton Oilers, San Jose Sharks, Minnesota Wild, Atlanta Thrashers, New York Islanders, Ottawa Senators and Anaheim Ducks in a 14-year career.

== Playing career ==
=== Minor/Collegiate ===
Sutton was born in London, Ontario, and played most of his youth hockey with the Greater London Hockey Association and the rep London Sabres AAA program.

At the age of 14, Sutton moved with his family to Kingston, Ontario. He played Junior "B" hockey in Gananoque, Ontario, at age 16, later playing in the Metro Toronto Junior Hockey League for St. Mike's B's. His play with St. Mike's earned him a scholarship to play collegiate hockey for Michigan Technological University in the Western Collegiate Hockey Association (WCHA). Sutton played four seasons with Michigan Tech, where he switched from left wing to defence.

=== Professional ===
Six weeks before he was to finish his degree in environmental engineering, Sutton was signed as a free agent by the NHL's San Jose Sharks on March 20, 1998. He made his NHL debut with the Sharks in the 1998–99 season and played in 71 games in his two seasons with San Jose before being selected by the Minnesota Wild in the 2000 NHL Expansion Draft.

Sutton played parts of two seasons with the Wild before being traded to the Atlanta Thrashers in exchange for forward Hnat Domenichelli on January 22, 2002. Sutton spent over four-and-a-half years with the Thrashers, appearing in 273 games and establishing himself as one of the NHL's most physically-imposing defenders. In 2005–06, Sutton registered a career-high eight goals and 25 points.

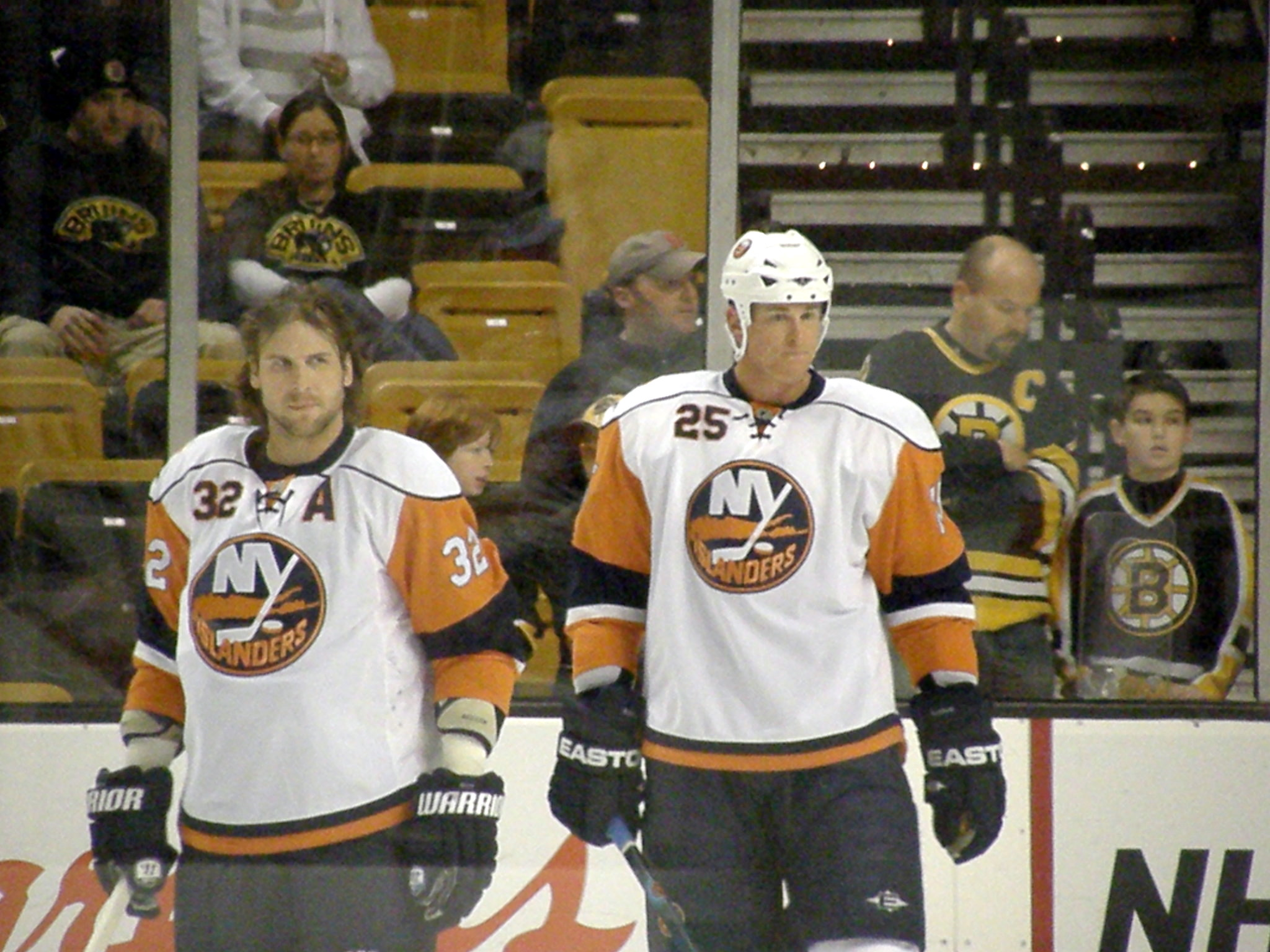
Sutton (right) and Brendan Witt in 2008

Sutton became an unrestricted free agent after the 2006–07 season and signed a three-year contract with the New York Islanders on August 10, 2007. In the 2008–09 season, his second with the Islanders, Sutton played in only 23 games before a broken foot sidelined him for the remainder of the season.

Sutton returned for the 2009–10 season, scoring four goals in 54 games with the Islanders before being traded to the Ottawa Senators at the NHL trade deadline in exchange for a second-round pick in the 2010 NHL entry draft. TV commentator Don Cherry called it the "biggest" trade of the year in reference to Sutton's size and the potential impact his physical play could make for the Senators in the post-season. Indeed, in Ottawa's first round playoff series Sutton delivered a devastating and much publicized hip-check to Pittsburgh Penguins' defenceman Jordan Leopold, described as one of the most devastating hits in recent memory.

On August 2, 2010, Sutton signed as a free agent to a two-year, $4.25 million contract with the Anaheim Ducks. After only one season in Anaheim, Sutton was traded to the Edmonton Oilers in exchange for Kurtis Foster on July 1, 2011 .

While with the Oilers, Sutton delivered an illegal check to the head on Colorado Avalanche forward Gabriel Landeskog on October 28, 2011. Though Landeskog was uninjured, the illegality of the hit resulted in a five-game suspension for Sutton. Just a few weeks later, on December 8, 2011, Sutton was suspended indefinitely pending a hearing as a result of a hit delivered to Carolina Hurricanes' forward Alexei Ponikarovsky. He ended up receiving an eight-game suspension. Sutton finished the season with three goals and ten points in 52 games.

On May 22, 2013, Sutton officially announced his retirement from professional hockey.

== Career statistics ==
=== Regular season and playoffs ===
			Regular season					Playoffs
Season	Team	League	GP	G	A	Pts	PIM	GP	G	A	Pts	PIM
1991–92	Gananoque Islanders	EOJBHL	36	11	9	20	—	14	9	21	30	—
1992–93	Gananoque Islanders	EOJBHL	38	14	9	23	—	12	16	13	29	—
1993–94	St. Michael's Buzzers	MetJHL	48	17	23	40	161	3	0	0	0	20
1994–95	Michigan Technological University	WCHA	19	2	1	3	42	—	—	—	—	—
1995–96	Michigan Technological University	WCHA	32	2	2	4	38	—	—	—	—	—
1996–97	Michigan Technological University	WCHA	32	2	7	9	73	—	—	—	—	—
1997–98	Michigan Technological University	WCHA	38	16	24	40	97	—	—	—	—	—
1997–98	Kentucky Thoroughblades	AHL	7	0	0	0	33	—	—	—	—	—
1998–99	San Jose Sharks	NHL	31	0	3	3	65	—	—	—	—	—
1998–99	Kentucky Thoroughblades	AHL	21	5	10	15	53	5	0	0	0	23
1999–00	Kentucky Thoroughblades	AHL	3	0	1	1	0	—	—	—	—	—
1999–00	San Jose Sharks	NHL	40	1	1	2	80	—	—	—	—	—
2000–01	Minnesota Wild	NHL	69	3	4	7	131	—	—	—	—	—
2001–02	Minnesota Wild	NHL	19	2	4	6	35	—	—	—	—	—
2001–02	Atlanta Thrashers	NHL	24	0	4	4	46	—	—	—	—	—
2002–03	Atlanta Thrashers	NHL	53	3	18	21	114	—	—	—	—	—
2003–04	Atlanta Thrashers	NHL	65	8	13	21	94	—	—	—	—	—
2004–05	ZSC Lions	NLA	8	2	2	4	32	1	0	1	1	2
2004–05	GCK Lions	NLB	18	8	18	26	58	—	—	—	—	—
2005–06	Atlanta Thrashers	NHL	76	8	17	25	144	—	—	—	—	—
2006–07	Atlanta Thrashers	NHL	55	2	14	16	76	4	0	0	0	10
2007–08	New York Islanders	NHL	58	1	7	8	86	—	—	—	—	—
2008–09	New York Islanders	NHL	23	2	8	10	40	—	—	—	—	—
2009–10	New York Islanders	NHL	54	4	8	12	73	—	—	—	—	—
2009–10	Ottawa Senators	NHL	18	1	0	1	34	6	0	0	0	8
2010–11	Anaheim Ducks	NHL	39	0	4	4	87	1	0	0	0	2
2011–12	Edmonton Oilers	NHL	52	3	7	10	80	—	—	—	—	—
NHL totals			676	38	112	150	1185	11	0	0	0	20

== Awards and honours ==
Award	Year
College
All-WCHA Second Team	1998

== Transactions ==
- March 20, 1998 - Signed as a free agent by San Jose Sharks.
- June 12, 2000 - Traded to Minnesota by San Jose with San Jose's seventh-round choice (Peter Bartos) in 2000 NHL entry draft and San Jose's third-round choice in 2001 NHL entry draft for Minnesota's eighth-round choice in the 2001 Draft and future considerations.
- January 22, 2002 - Traded to Atlanta Thrashers by Minnesota for Hnat Domenichelli.
- September 24, 2004 - Signed as a free agent by GCK Zurich (Swiss-2).
- February 22, 2005 - Loaned to ZSC Zurich (Swiss) by GCK Zurich (Swiss-2).
- August 10, 2007 - Signed as a free agent by New York Islanders.
- March 2, 2010 - Traded to Ottawa Senators by Islanders for a second-round choice in 2010 NHL entry draft.
- August 2, 2010 - Signed as a free agent by Anaheim Ducks.
- July 1, 2011 - Traded to Edmonton Oilers by Anaheim Ducks for Kurtis Foster.

Awards and achievements
Preceded by Eric Rud	WCHA Defensive Player of the Year; 1997–98; With: Matt Henderson	Succeeded by Brad Williamson
