= Shawville Pontiacs =

- City: Shawville, Quebec, Canada
- League: Northern Premier Hockey League
- Division: Capital - East
- Founded: 1952
- Home arena: Shawville Arena
- Colours: Black, yellow, white,
- President: Darcy Findlay
- Head coach: Darcy Findlay
- Asst. coach: Matt Warren

The Shawville Pontiacs are a Senior "A" team based out of Shawville, Quebec. They play out of the Northern Premier Hockey League.

== History (Senior team) ==
The Shawville Pontiacs boast a long and varied senior hockey heritage. The team first appeared in the Outaouais Senior Hockey League during the 1973–74 season as a senior amateur club representing Shawville, Quebec. Their roots date back further, participating in local leagues such as the Pontiac League (1952–56), Algonquin League (1952), Upper Ottawa Valley Hockey (1957), and the St. Lawrence League (1957–1975) Shawville Pontiacs. After decades dominated by their junior-level presence, the Pontiacs returned to the senior ranks ahead of the 2025–26 season, re-establishing the historic name and colors through relocation of the Fort Coulonge Comets into the Northern Premier Hockey League (NPHL), marking a revival of local senior‑level competition .

== History (Junior team) ==
At the conclusion of the 2014-15 season, the league announced it was re-organizing to be more of dedicated developmental league to the Central Canada Hockey League and renamed the league Central Canada Hockey League Tier 2. Initially, the league was to downsize to twelve teams (one feeder club for each Tier 1 team), however it reduced to 16 teams, eliminating 6 of the current franchises, including the Akwesasne Wolves, Morrisburg Lions, Almonte Thunder, Gananoque Islanders, Gatineau Mustangs and Shawville Pontiacs.

On May 24, 2015, team President officially declared the team was folding.

== Season-by-Season results ==
Season	GP	W	L	T	OTL	GF	GA	P	Results	Playoffs
1999-00	40	18	15	7	3	184	161	50	3rd EO Valley	Lost preliminary
2000-01	45	30	18	3	1	191	181	64	1st EO Valley	Lost Division SF
2001-02	40	16	20	4	2	158	201	38	4th EO Valley	Lost preliminary
2002-03	40	17	22	1	0	180	197	35	4th EO Valley	Lost division final
2003-04	40	21	17	2	1	165	156	45	2nd EO Valley	Lost division final
2004-05	40	20	13	6	1	132	122	47	2nd EO Valley	Lost Division SF
2005-06	39	17	21	1	0	130	158	35	5th EO Valley	Lost Conference Final
2006-07	40	20	16	2	2	154	185	44	2nd EO Valley	Lost Division SF
2007-08	39	19	17	2	1	186	176	41	3rd EO Valley	Lost Division SF
2008-09	40	13	20	2	5	187	221	33	4th EO Valley	Lost Division QF
2009-10	45	10	32	2	1	149	239	23	6th EO Valley	DNQ
2010-11	42	9	30	1	2	136	238	21	6th EO Valley	DNQ
2011-12	42	9	30	0	3	171	249	21	6th EO Valley	DNQ
Season	GP	W	L	OTL	SOL	GF	GA	P	Results	Playoffs
2012-13	41	13	24	2	2	127	190	30	6th EO Valley	DNQ
2013-14	41	18	18	4	1	179	168	41	4th EO Valley	Lost Division QF
2014-15	40	21	15	2	2	189	142	46	4th EO Valley	Lost div. semi-final, 2-4 (Timberwolves)
