= Gananoque Islanders =

Canadian junior ice hockey team

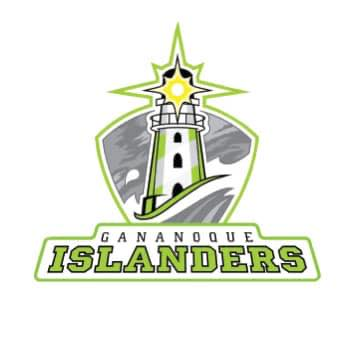
- City: Gananoque, Ontario, Canada
- League: Provincial Junior Hockey League
- Founded: 1972
- Folded: 2021
- Home arena: Gananoque Recreation Centre
- Colours: Green, Grey, and White
- Owner: Jeff McEwen
- General manager: Tom Dickson
- Head coach: Tom Dickson (2021-Present)

Franchise history
- 1972–86: Gananoque G-Men
- 1986–93: Gananoque Platers
- 1993–2021: Gananoque Islanders

The Gananoque Islanders were a Canadian junior team based out of Gananoque, Ontario.

They were members of the Junior C Provincial Junior Hockey League from 2016 to 2019. For the 2015–16 season they played in the Empire B Junior C Hockey League, but were members of the Eastern Ontario Junior Hockey League a Junior B hockey league from 1986 until 2015.

== History ==
The G-Men started out in the EOJHL in 1972. In 1977, they opted to move to the Ontario Hockey Association's Quinte-St. Lawrence Junior C Hockey League. In 1986, the league merged with the Central Junior C Hockey League and the G-Men returned to the EOJHL. They changed their name to the Platers that year and then the Islanders in 1993.

At the conclusion of the 2014-15 season, the league announced it was re-organizing to be more of a dedicated developmental league to the Central Canada Hockey League and renamed the league Central Canada Hockey League Tier 2. Initially, the league was to downsize to twelve teams (one feeder club for each Tier 1 team), however it reduced to six teams, removing six of the current franchises, including the Akwesasne Wolves, Morrisburg Lions, Almonte Thunder, Gananoque Islanders, Gatineau Mustangs and Shawville Pontiacs.

The Gananoque Islanders announced that they would continue their franchise in the Empire B Junior C Hockey League beginning in 2015-16. For the 2016/17 season the Empire B league combined with seven other Southern Ontario leagues to become the Provincial Junior Hockey League. The members of the Empire league became the Tod Division in the East Conference of the PJHL.

The team folded from the PJHL in 2021.

In 2021 new senior Gananoque team became part of the EOSHL. In August 2025, they folded.

== Notable alumni ==
- Andy Sutton - Current Edmonton Oilers defenceman.
- Erik Cole - Current Dallas Stars -
- Hunter Drew - Current San Diego Gulls (AHL) Defenceman
- Randy Payne - Dedicated Soldier killed in Afghanistan April 22, 2006

== Season-by-season results ==
Season	GP	W	L	T	OTL	GF	GA	P	Results	Playoffs
1977-78	32	16	14	2	-	176	128	34	2nd QSLJHL	
1978-79	Quinte-St. Lawrence Jr. C Standings Not Available									
1979-80	32	22	10	0	-	234	167	44	1st QSLJHL	
1980-81	34	13	13	8	-	--	--	34	4th QSLJHL	
1981-82	34	4	23	7	-	--	--	15	6th QSLJHL	
1982-83	34	17	15	2	-	174	145	36	4th QSLJHL	
1983-84	Quinte-St. Lawrence Jr. C Standings Not Available									
1984-85	30	23	6	1	-	219	125	47	1st QSLJHL	
1985-86	Quinte-St. Lawrence Jr. C Standings Not Available									
1986-99	Eastern Ontario Junior Hockey League Standings Not Available									
1999-00	42	26	15	1	-	204	149	53	2nd EO Rideau	Lost Division Final
2000-01	44	22	21	1	-	194	187	45	3rd EO Rideau	Lost semi-final
2001-02	44	16	25	3	-	167	194	36	3rd EO Rideau	Lost Division Final
2002-03	44	28	13	3	0	251	205	59	2nd EO Rideau	Lost Division S-final
2003-04	44	26	13	3	2	207	166	57	2nd EO Rideau	Lost Division S-final
2004-05	44	22	19	2	1	224	203	47	3rd EO Rideau	Lost Division Final
2005-06	42	14	23	2	3	206	217	33	4th EO Rideau	Lost Division S-final
2006-07	44	24	16	2	2	205	171	52	3rd EO Rideau	Lost Division S-final
2007-08	42	21	17	3	1	171	166	46	3rd EO Rideau	Lost Division S-final
2008-09	42	17	20	3	2	169	185	39	4th EO Rideau	Lost semi-final
2009-10	44	14	23	3	4	166	204	35	4th EO Rideau	Lost Division S-Final
2010-11	46	15	30	0	1	167	254	31	4th EO Rideau	Lost Division S-Final
2011-12	46	27	17	0	2	210	183	56	3rd EO Rideau	
2012-13	46	29	14	0	3	213	162	61	2nd EO Rideau	
Season	GP	W	L	OTL	SOL	GF	GA	P	Results	Playoffs
2013-14	45	28	14	1	2	168	137	59	1st EO Rideau	Lost semi-final
2014-15	44	17	24	1	2	121	175	37	5th EO Rideau	DNQ
Empire B Junior 'C' Hockey League
2015-16	40	11	24	5	-	158	193	27	4th of 6 EBJCHL	Lost semi finals 0-4 (Panthers)
Provincial Junior Hockey League
2016-17	40	21	18	1	-	160	144	43	3rd of 6 Tod Div-PJHL	Lost div semi-finals, 1-4 (Raiders)
2017-18	38	8	28	2	-	101	246	18	5th of 6 Tod Div-PJHL	Did not qualify
2018-19	43	13	27	2	1	150	164	29	5th of 6 Tod Div-PJHL	Did not qualify
Eastern Ontario Super Hockey League										
2021 - 2022	18	9	7	0	2	94	79	20	4th of 6 West Div - EOSHL	Playoffs Lost finals 3-2 Games (North Dundas Rockets)
