= Char-Lan Rebels =

- City: Williamstown, Ontario, Canada
- League: Eastern Ontario Junior Hockey League
- Division: St. Lawrence
- Founded: 1979
- Folded: 2024
- Home arena: Charlottenburgh Recreation Centre
- Colours: Blue, red, white
- General manager: Jeff Carter
- Head coach: Jeff Carter

The Char-Lan Rebels were a junior ice hockey team in Williamstown, Ontario. Between 2014–15 and the end of the 2019–20 seasons, the EOJHL and the CCHL set a new agreement in an attempt to create a better player development model. This resulted in the league re-branding itself as the Central Canada Hockey League Tier 2 (CCHL2), and shrinking to 16 teams and two divisions. The league reverted to the Eastern Ontario Junior Hockey League for 2021.

Upon the completion of the 2023–24 season it was announced that the Alexandia Glens and the Char-Lan Rebels would merge. The new team will be known as the Glengarry Brigade.

== History ==
The Rebels have an intense rivalry with the Alexandria Glens. The rivalry has been touted as "The Battle of Glengarry" within the local community. Games between the teams are often heated events.

== Season-by-season results ==
| Season | GP | W | L | T | OTL | GF | GA | Pts | Results | Playoffs |
| 1999–00 | 45 | 28 | 11 | 6 | — | 210 | 146 | 65 | 2nd EO StLawr | Lost Division Final |
| 2000–01 | 45 | 19 | 21 | 5 | — | 168 | 178 | 43 | 4th EO StLawr | Lost Division Semi-final |
| 2001–02 | 45 | 33 | 7 | 5 | — | 242 | 123 | 71 | 1st EO StLawr | Lost Final |
| 2002–03 | 45 | 25 | 17 | 2 | 1 | 209 | 181 | 53 | 2nd EO StLawr | Lost Division Semi-final |
| 2003–04 | 45 | 32 | 10 | 1 | 2 | 214 | 152 | 67 | 2nd EO StLawr | Lost Division Final |
| 2004–05 | 45 | 23 | 19 | 2 | 1 | 203 | 179 | 49 | 3rd EO StLawr | Lost Division Semi-final |
| 2005–06 | 45 | 16 | 24 | 2 | 3 | 203 | 261 | 37 | 5th EO StLawr | Did not qualify |
| 2006–07 | 40 | 8 | 30 | 2 | 0 | 133 | 236 | 18 | 6th EO StLawr | Did not qualify |
| 2007–08 | 42 | 15 | 20 | 4 | 3 | 172 | 211 | 37 | 3rd EO StLawr | Lost Division Semi-final |
| 2008–09 | 42 | 25 | 15 | 1 | 1 | 207 | 161 | 52 | 3rd EO StLawr | |
| 2009–10 | 40 | 19 | 17 | 2 | 2 | 160 | 186 | 42 | 3rd EO StLawr | Lost Division Semi-final |
| 2010–11 | 42 | 8 | 32 | 0 | 2 | 132 | 269 | 18 | 6th EO StLawr | Did not qualify |
| 2011–12 | 41 | 14 | 24 | 0 | 3 | 144 | 232 | 31 | 4th EO StLawr | |
| 2012–13 | 42 | 22 | 17 | 0 | 3 | 171 | 174 | 47 | 2nd EO StLawr | |
| Season | GP | W | L | OTL | SOL | GF | GA | Pts | Results | Playoffs |
| 2013–14 | 41 | 22 | 14 | 1 | 4 | 176 | 162 | 49 | 2nd EO StLawr | Lost Div. Semi-final |
| 2014–15 | 40 | 19 | 20 | 0 | 1 | 171 | 176 | 39 | 4th EO StLawr | Lost Div. Semi-final, 2–4 (Vikings) |
| 2015–16 | 44 | 17 | 21 | 3 | 3 | 178 | 208 | 40 | 5th of 8, Martin; 10th of 16, CCHL2 | Lost 10th Pl. Tie breaker game, 3–5 (Hawks) |
| 2016–17 | 48 | 12 | 33 | 1 | 2 | 173 | 265 | 27 | 8th of 8, Martin; 15th of 16, CCHL2 | Did not qualify |
| 2017–18 | 52 | 20 | 30 | 0 | 1 | 175 | 219 | 41 | 6th of 8, Martin; 12th of 16, CCHL2 | Did not qualify |
| 2018–19 | 44 | 20 | 20 | 3 | 1 | 147 | 167 | 44 | 4th of 8, Martin; 9th of 16, CCHL2 | Lost Quarters 0-4 (Canadians) |
| 2019–20 | 44 | 20 | 21 | 1 | 2 | 157 | 177 | 43 | 6th of 8, Martin; 11th of 16, CCHL2 | Did not qualify |
| 2020-21 | Season lost to covid | | | | | | | | | |
| 2021-22 | 46 | 14 | 22 | 2 | 4 | 103 | 153 | 34 | 5th of 8, Martin; 11th of 16, EOJHL | Lost Play in 0-2 (Vikings) |
| 2022-23 | 42 | 14 | 22 | 5 | 1 | 115 | 156 | 34 | 7th of 8, Martin; 13th of 16, EOJHL | Did not qualify for Post Season Play |
| 2023-24 | 44 | 9 | 29 | 5 | 1 | 87 | 203 | 24 | 6th of 7, Martin; 11th of 14, EOJHL | Lost Div Quarters 0-3 (Canadians) |
Merged with the Alexandria Glens - see * * Glengarry Brigade * *
