= Valley Timberwolves =

Renfrew Timberwolves
- City: Renfrew, Ontario, Canada
- League: Central Canada Hockey League Tier 2
- Division: Richardson
- Founded: 1968
- Home arena: Ma-Te-Way Activity Centre
- Colours: Blue, white, gold, black, grey
- Owner: Ryan Leonard
- General manager: Hamish Fraser
- Head coach: Rob McCoy

Franchise history
- 1968-1973: Renfrew Lions
- 1973-2020: Renfrew Timberwolves
- 2020-2024: Valley Timberwolves
- 2024-present: Renfrew Timberwolves

The Renfrew Timberwolves are a Canadian junior ice hockey team based in Renfrew, Ontario. They played in the Eastern Ontario Junior Hockey League (EOJHL) until the league was rebranded as the Central Canada Hockey League Tier 2 (CCHL2) in 2015.

== History ==
The franchise was founded in 1967 as the Renfrew Lions, sponsored by the Renfrew Lions Club, and won its first Eastern Ontario Championship that same year.

The team was renamed the Timberwolves in the early 1970s and subsequently won four additional Eastern Ontario titles in 1977, 1988, 1990, and 1993. The team has also won eight Valley Division titles and four Boxing Day Tournament titles. Several individual players from the program have advanced to university, semi-professional, or professional hockey teams.

The Timberwolves are one of 13 franchises in the EOJHL and compete in the Richardson Division (formerly the Valley Division).

On October 27, 2017, four young Timberwolves players were involved in a fatal, alcohol-related motor vehicle accident. The team honored the players that season by hanging their numbers from the arena rafters and stenciling number patches under the ice. The Timberwolves qualified for the playoffs later that season, winning their opening series before being eliminated in the following round.

Following a brief, unsuccessful relocation to Eganville as the Valley Timberwolves, the franchise returned to Renfrew under new ownership and staff, moving into a new ice rink.

During the 2024–2025 season, the team won its first Richardson Division title and set a regular-season franchise record for wins, finishing with a 30–15–2–1 record. They were later eliminated in the division semifinals.

== Season-by-season results ==
| Season | GP | W | L | T | OTL | GF | GA | P | Results | Playoffs |
| 1999-00 | 40 | 25 | 14 | 1 | 1 | 168 | 131 | 53 | 1st EO Valley | Lost semi-final |
| 2000-01 | 45 | 29 | 18 | 2 | 1 | 194 | 185 | 61 | 2nd EO Valley | Lost Division Final |
| 2001-02 | 40 | 19 | 18 | 3 | 1 | 190 | 184 | 42 | 2nd EO Valley | Lost Preliminary |
| 2002-03 | 40 | 11 | 25 | 4 | 2 | 128 | 219 | 28 | 5th EO Valley | Lost Preliminary |
| 2003-04 | 40 | 18 | 18 | 4 | 0 | 151 | 177 | 40 | 4th EO Valley | Lost Division S-final |
| 2004-05 | 40 | 14 | 22 | 2 | 2 | 130 | 168 | 32 | 5th EO Valley | Lost Preliminary |
| 2005-06 | 40 | 20 | 18 | 0 | 2 | 148 | 157 | 42 | 2nd EO Valley | Lost Preliminary |
| 2006-07 | 40 | 18 | 18 | 3 | 1 | 175 | 158 | 40 | 4th EO Valley | Lost Preliminary |
| 2007-08 | 40 | 11 | 25 | 4 | 0 | 147 | 202 | 26 | 5th EO Valley | Lost Preliminary |
| 2008-09 | 40 | 10 | 23 | 6 | 1 | 141 | 220 | 27 | 6th EO Valley | |
| 2009-10 | 45 | 21 | 20 | 2 | 2 | 177 | 170 | 46 | 3rd EO Valley | Lost Division Final |
| 2010-11 | 42 | 20 | 18 | 4 | 0 | 170 | 157 | 44 | 4th EO Valley | Lost semi-final |
| 2011-12 | 42 | 16 | 23 | 3 | 0 | 157 | 190 | 35 | 4th EO Valley | |
| 2012-13 | 42 | 20 | 19 | - | 3 | 146 | 162 | 43 | 2nd EO Valley | Lost semi-final |
| 2013-14 | 41 | 24 | 13 | - | 4 | 181 | 151 | 52 | 1st EO Valley | Lost Division Final |
| 2014-15 | 40 | 27 | 9 | - | 4 | 183 | 144 | 58 | 1st EO Valley | Won Div. Semi-finals, 4-2 (Pontiacs); Lost Div. Final, 0-4 (Rams) |
CCHL 2 - returned to EOJHL 2020-21 season
| 2015-16 | 44 | 18 | 24 | 2 | 0 | 183 | 208 | 38 | 6th of 8 Richardson; 12th of 16 CCHL2 | Did not qualify |
| 2016-17 | 48 | 8 | 36 | 4 | 0 | 123 | 194 | 20 | 8 of 8 Richardson; 16th of 16 CCHL2 | Did not qualify |
| 2017-18 | 52 | 24 | 23 | 5 | 0 | 196 | 211 | 53 | 5 of 8 Richardson; 10th of 16 CCHL2 | Won Div. Qualifying 2-0 (Aeros); Lost div. semi-final 3-4 (Jr. Canadians) |
| 2018-19 | 42 | 21 | 20 | 1 | 1 | 165 | 187 | 44 | 5 of 8 Richardson; 9th of 16 CCHL2 | Lost Div. Qualifying 1-2 (Jr. Canadians) |
| 2019-20 | 44 | 25 | 14 | 1 | 4 | 167 | 137 | 55 | 4 of 8 Richardson; 8th of 16 CCHL2 | Lost Div. Qualifying 1-2 (Packers) |
Valley Timberwolves
| 2020-21 | Season canceled due to COVID-19 pandemic | | | | | | | | | |
| 2021-22 | 40 | 7 | 30 | 3 | 0 | 93 | 212 | 17 | 8 of 8 Richardson; 16th of 16 EOJHL | Did not qualify |
| 2022-23 | 40 | 3 | 39 | 0 | 0 | 102 | 304 | 6 | 8 of 8 Richardson; 16th of 16 EOJHL | Did not qualify |
| 2023-24 | 44 | 16 | 22 | 3 | 3 | 132 | 153 | 38 | 6 of 7 Richardson; 10th of 14 EOJHL | Lost Div. Quarters 2-3 (Royals) |
Renfrew Timberwolves
| 2024-25 | 48 | 30 | 15 | 2 | 1 | 160 | 148 | 63 | 1st of 7 Richardson; 4th of 13 EOJHL | Lost Div. Semis 1-4 (Jr. Canadians) |
| 2025-26 | 44 | 20 | 19 | 3 | 2 | 163 | 172 | 45 | 4th of 7 Richardson; 7th of 13 EOJHL | Won Div. Wild Card 3-0 (Aeros); Won Div. Semifinals 4-3 (Packers); Lost Div. Finals 0-4 (Jr. Bears) |

== See also ==
- Renfrew Creamery Kings
