= Perth Blue Wings =

- City: Perth, Ontario, Canada
- League: Eastern Ontario Junior Hockey League
- Division: Richardson
- Founded: 1936
- Home arena: Perth & District Community Centre
- Colours: Blue, white
- Owners: Bryan Greer & Jeff Choffe
- General manager: Jeff Choffe
- Head coach: Bryan Greer
- Website: Official website: https://www.perthbluewingsjrb.com/

The Perth Blue Wings are a Canadian Junior ice hockey team based in Perth, Ontario. They currently play in the Eastern Ontario Junior Hockey League. The Blue Wings transitioned to private ownership in May 2013 under Michael McLean, the former owner of the Smiths Falls Bears. Following the impact of the COVID-19 pandemic, McLean sold the franchise to local buyers Bryan Greer and Jeff Choffe.

Between 2014-15 and the end of the 2019-2020 seasons, the EOJHL and the CCHL set a new agreement in an attempt to create a better player development model. This resulted in the league re-branding itself as the Central Canada Hockey League Tier 2 (CCHL2), and shrinking to 16 teams and two divisions. The league reverted to the Eastern Ontario Junior Hockey League for 2021. The league also went from 4 divisions to 2 divisions and the Blue Wings were assigned to the Richardson Division.

The Perth Blue Wings won the Barkley Cup in 2019 and then again in 2023.

== Season-by-season results ==
Season	GP	W	L	T	OTL	GF	GA	P	Results	Playoffs
1981-82	40	26	10	4	-	254	201	56	1st EO-NEast	
1982-83	32	18	17	7	-	229	198	43	5th EO-Valley	
1983-84	Statistics Not Available									
1984-85	36	7	27	2	-	137	283	16	7th EO-Valley	
1985-86	36	9	23	4	-	161	230	22	7th EO-NWest	
1986-87	38	19	19	0	0	215	178	38	3rd EO-Valley	
1987-99	Statistics Not Available									
1999-00	40	20	15	5	0	174	147	48	4th EO Valley	Lost division final
2000-01	45	18	29	0	3	160	194	39	5th EO Valley	Lost preliminary
2001-02	40	18	22	0	2	167	188	38	3rd EO Valley	Lost Division S-final
2002-03	40	13	37	0	1	159	208	27	6th EO Valley	Lost preliminary
2003-04	40	11	28	1	1	94	201	24	6th EO Valley	Lost preliminary
2004-05	40	24	12	3	1	159	127	52	1st EO Valley	Lost semi-final
2005-06	39	25	8	3	3	174	115	56	1st EO Valley	Lost division final
2006-07	40	18	17	2	3	156	165	41	3rd EO Valley	Lost preliminary
2007-08	40	21	16	3	0	140	144	45	2nd EO Valley	Lost Division S-final
2008-09	39	11	20	3	5	125	149	30	5th EO Valley	
2009-10	45	23	13	6	3	191	143	55	1st EO Valley	Lost semi-final
2010-11	42	30	10	1	1	199	135	62	1st EO Valley	Lost Division S-Final
2011-12	42	20	16	4	2	194	181	46	2nd EO Valley	
Season	GP	W	L	OTL	SOL	GF	GA	P	Results	Playoffs
2012-13	42	25	14	2	1	193	172	53	1st EO Valley	
2013-14	41	16	17	2	6	156	165	40	6th EO Valley	DNQ
2014-15	40	10	30	0	0	108	206	20	6th EO Valley	DNQ
CCHL 2 - returned to EOJHL 2020-21 season
2015-16	44	38	4	1	1	260	116	78	1st of 8 Richardson; 2nd of 16 CCHL2	Won quarterfinals, 4-0(Aeros); Won semifinals, 4-2 (Rams); Lost League Finals, 1-4 (Vikings)
2016-17	48	39	8	0	1	223	123	79	1 of 8 Richardson; 2nd of 16 CCHL2	Lost quarterfinals, 3-4 (Aeros)
2017-18	52	31	17	3	1	181	158	66	3 of 8 Richardson; 6th of 16 CCHL2	Won Div. Semifinals, 4-2 (Rideaus); Lost Lea. Semifinals 3-4 (Vikings)
2018-19	44	27	12	5	0	150	115	59	2 of 8 Richardson; 5th of 16 CCHL2	Won Div. Semifinals, 4-1 (Tikis); Won Div. Finals 4-0 (Jr. Canadians); Won League Finals 4-1 (Canadians); CCHL2 CHAMPIONS
2019-20	44	29	12	3	0	149	120	61	3 of 8 Richardson; 6th of 16 CCHL2	Incomplete Div. Semifinal 1-1 (Jr. Canadians); Remaining playoffs cancelled
2020-21	Season lost to covid									
2021-22	42	28	12	1	1	182	126	58	2 of 8 Richardson; 4th of 16 EOJHL	Won Div. Semifinals, 3-2 (Packers); Won Div. Finals 4-2 (Jr. Canadians); Lost League Finals 2-4 (Vikings)
2022-23	42	37	4	1	0	221	72	75	1st of 8 Richardson; 1st of 16 EOJHL	Won Div. Semifinals, 4-1 (Aeros); Won Div. Finals 4-0 (Packers); Won League Finals 4-1 (Vikings); Barkley Cup Champions
2023-24	44	17	24	3	0	136	170	37	7 of 7 Richardson; 11th of 14 EOJHL	Did Not Qualify
2024-25	48	20	23	2	3	131	165	45	6 of 7 Richardson; 10th of 13 EOJHL	Did Not Qualify
2025-26	44	15	26	1	2	154	185	33	6 of 7 Richardson; 12th of 13 EOJHL	Did Not Qualify
