= Smith Falls Jr. Bears =

Smiths Falls Jr Bears
- City: Smiths Falls, Ontario, Canada
- League: Eastern Ontario Junior Hockey League
- Division: Richardson
- Founded: 1967
- Home arena: Smiths Falls Memorial Community Centre
- Colours: Green, white
- Owners: Nicholas and Joshua Filoso
- General manager: Joshua Filoso
- Head coach: Jeff Covell
- Affiliates: Smiths Falls Bears (CCHL)

Franchise history
- 1967-2022: Westport Rideaus
- 2022-present: Smiths Falls Jr Bears

The Smith Falls Jr Bears are a Junior "B" ice hockey team in Smith Falls, Ontario. The franchise originated as the Westport Rideaus and played in the Eastern Ontario Junior Hockey League (EOJHL). Between 2014-15 and the end of the 2019–2020 seasons, the EOJHL and the CCHL set a new agreement in an attempt to create a better player development model. This resulted in the league re-branding itself as the Central Canada Hockey League Tier 2 (CCHL2), and shrinking to 16 teams and two divisions. The league reverted to the Eastern Ontario Junior Hockey League for 2021. As of the 2025-2026 season, the league currently has 13 teams.

August 2022, it was announced that the Junior B Rideaus were being relocated to Smith Falls and become the Jr. Bears. The junior C franchise that was re-locate from Bytown to Westport would continue the name Rideaus as they compete in the National Capital Hockey League. The Junior "B" Bears play their home games at the Smiths Falls Memorial Community Centre.

== Season-by-season results ==
Season	GP	W	L	T	OTL	GF	GA	P	Results	Playoffs
1999-00	42	27	11	4	-	218	136	60	1st EO Rideau	Lost semi-final
2000-01	44	27	15	2	-	228	188	56	1st EO Rideau	Lost division final
2001-02	44	28	14	2	-	220	155	61	2nd EO Rideau	Lost Division Semi-final
2002-03	44	23	17	2	2	193	183	50	3rd EO Rideau	Lost division final
2003-04	44	22	16	2	4	197	189	50	3rd EO Rideau	Lost division final
2004-05	44	19	21	1	3	225	211	42	4th EO Rideau	Lost semi-final
2005-06	42	35	5	1	1	323	154	72	1st EO Rideau	Lost final
2006-07	44	24	14	5	1	211	167	54	2nd EO Rideau	Lost semi-final
2007-08	42	23	17	1	1	184	161	48	2nd EO Rideau	Lost division final
2008-09	42	20	17	1	4	218	212	45	2nd EO Rideau	Lost division final
2009-10	44	29	10	5	0	241	172	63	1st EO Rideau	Lost division final
2010-11	46	28	18	0	0	254	183	56	2nd EO Rideau	Lost division final
2011-12	46	34	10	1	1	237	158	70	1st EO Rideau	Lost division final
2012-13	46	28	15	0	3	215	175	59	3rd EO Rideau	Lost Division Semi-final
Season	GP	W	L	OTL	SOL	GF	GA	P	Results	Playoffs
2013-14	45	17	20	6	2	143	160	42	4th EO Rideau	Lost Division Semi-final
2014-15	44	19	24	0	1	169	176	39	4th EO Rideau	Lost div. semi-final, 2-4 (Flyers)
CCHL 2
2015-16	44	26	17	1	0	171	152	53	3rd of 8 Richardson; 6th of 16 CCHL2	Lost quarterfinal, 3-4 (Rams)
2016-17	48	25	17	4	2	200	173	56	5th of 8 Richardson; 8th of 16 CCHL2	Lost Wildcard Series, 1-2 (Aeros)
2017-18	52	34	13	3	2	198	141	73	2nd of 8 Richardson; 3rd of 16 CCHL2	Lost div semi-final 2-4 (Blue Wings)
2020-21	Season lost to covid									
Smith Falls Jr Bears EOJHL
2022-23	42	28	12	2	0	193	127	58	3RD of 8 Richardson; 5TH of 16 CCHL2	Won Div Quarterfinal 2-0 (Jr. Canadians); Lost div semi-finals 1-4 (Packers)
2023-24	44	22	18	4	0	131	135	48	4th of 7 Richardson; 6th of 14 CCHL2	Won Div Quarterfinal 3-0 (Aeros); Lost Div semi-finals 1-4 (Jr. Canadians)
2024-25	48	22	20	3	3	153	183	50	5th of 7 Richardson; 8th of 13 CCHL2	Lost Div Wildcard 1-3 (Jr. Canadians)
2025-26	44	21	18	4	1	154	165	47	2nd of 7 Richardson; 5th of 13 CCHL2	Won Div Semi-finals 4-2 (Royals); Won Div Finals 4-0 (Timberwolves); Lost league Finals 1-4 (Vikings)

== Notable alumni ==
- Jimmy Howard
