= Richmond Royals =

- City: Ottawa, Ontario, Canada
- League: Eastern Ontario Junior Hockey League
- Division: Martin
- Founded: 1968
- Home arena: Richmond Community Centre
- Colours: black, blue, white, silver
- Owner: Shawn Couturier
- General manager: Hamish Fraser (2013-14)
- Head coach: Shawn Couturier (2016-17)

Franchise history
- 1968-1990: Richmond Royals
- 1990-2003: Goulbourn Royals
- 2003-2014: Stittsville Royals
- 2014-2016: Stittsville Rams
- 2016-present: Richmond Royals

The Richmond Royals are a Junior ice hockey team in Richmond, Ontario,(Ottawa) Between 2014-15 and the end of the 2019–2020 seasons, the EOJHL and the CCHL set a new agreement in an attempt to create a better player development model. This resulted in the league re-branding itself as the Central Canada Hockey League Tier 2 (CCHL2), and shrinking to 16 teams and two divisions. The league reverted to the Eastern Ontario Junior Hockey League for 2021.

== History ==
During the summer of 2014, the Stittsville Minor Hockey Association announced a 3-year partnership with the Junior 'B' hockey team. The new agreement includes the previous Stittsville Royals changing their name to the Stittsville RAMS Junior Hockey Club and wearing the RAMS logo and colours.

In their first year of the new logo and colors the Stittsville Rams advanced to the league final. Unfortunately they could not better the league defending champions, Casselman Vikings, dropping the series 2 games to four. During the final stages of the 2015–16 season the Minor Hockey association declared the affiliation terminated. The team completed the season as the Rams. During the off season the team changed ownership re-located and re-branded the team by returning to their roots as the Richmond Royals.

The addition of Embrun and Whitewater saw the league move the Royals from the Richardson to the Martin Division for the 2017–18 season.

== Season-by-season results ==
Season	GP	W	L	T	OTL	GF	GA	P	Results	Playoffs
1999-00	40	8	31	1	1	103	193	19	6th EO Valley	Lost Preliminary
2000-01	45	22	23	3	2	160	194	49	4th EO Valley	Lost Preliminary
2001-02	40	22	14	4	1	191	138	49	1st EO Valley	Lost semi-final
2002-03	40	22	15	3	1	185	141	48	1st EO Valley	Lost semi-final
2003-04	40	10	30	0	1	152	228	21	5th EO Metro	Lost Preliminary
2004-05	40	7	24	4	5	133	191	23	6th EO Valley	Lost Preliminary
2005-06	40	16	18	4	2	160	174	38	4th EO Valley	Lost Preliminary
2006-07	40	23	13	1	3	204	172	50	1st EO Valley	Lost semi-final
2007-08	40	18	18	2	2	176	186	40	4th EO Valley	Lost Valley Final
2008-09	40	26	11	3	0	198	160	55	2nd EO Valley	Lost Preliminary
2009-10	45	11	30	4	0	134	175	26	5th EO Valley	DNQ
2010-11	42	12	27	1	2	133	190	27	5th EO Valley	DNQ
2011-12	42	14	25	3	0	143	190	31	5th EO Valley	DNQ
2012-13	42	19	20	-	3	166	171	41	3rd EO Valley	
2013-14	41	18	18	-	5	137	156	40	5th EO Valley	DNQ
STITTSVILLE RAMS
2014-15	40	27	12	-	1	202	134	55	2nd EO Valley	Won Div. Semi-final, 3-4 (Packers) won Div. Final, 4-0 (Timberwolves); Won Conference, 4-2 (Mustangs); Lost League Finals, 2-4 (Vikings)
CCHL 2 (league name change)(2021 return name to EOJHL)
2015-16	44	30	12	1	1	219	173	62	2nd of 8 Richardson; 3rd of 16 CCHL2	Won quarterfinals 4-3 (Rideaus); Lost semifinals 2-4 (Blue Wings)
RICHMOND ROYALS
2016-17	48	32	12	2	2	240	173	68	3rd of 8 Richardson; 5th of 16 CCHL2	Won quarterfinals, 4-3 (Packers); Won semifinals 4-2 (Aeros); Lost League Finals 0-4 (Vikings)
2017-18	52	17	29	2	4	185	233	40	6th of 8 Martin; 13th of 16 CCHL2	Did not qualify
2018-19	44	10	33	0	1	149	236	21	8th of 8 Martin; 16th of 16 CCHL2	Did not qualify
2019-20	44	14	25	4	1	142	210	33	7th of 8 Martin; 13th of 16 CCHL2	Did not qualify
2020-21	Season lost to covid									
2021-22	42	12	28	1	1	134	177	26	8th of 8 Martin; 15th of 16 EOJHL	Did not qualify
2022-23	42	29	8	5	0	198	141	63	1st of 8 Martin; 3rd of 16 EOJHL	Won semifinals 4-1 (Canadians); Lost League Finals 3-4 (Vikings)
2023-24	44	25	17	1	1	156	138	52	3rd of 7 Richardson; 6th of 14 EOJHL	Won Quarterfinals 3-2 (Timberwolves); Won Div Semifinals 4-0 (Packers); Lost Div Finals, 3-4 (Jr Canadians)
2024-25	48	29	14	3	2	178	127	63	2nd of 7 Richardson; 5th of 13 EOJHL	Won Div Semifinals 4-1 (Aeros); Lost Div Finals, 1-4 (Jr Canadians)
2025-26	44	21	20	0	3	144	169	45	4th of 7 Richardson; 7th of 13 EOJHL	Lost Div Semifinals 2-4 (Jr. Bears)
