= Arnprior Packers =

- City: Arnprior, Ontario, Canada
- League: Eastern Ontario Junior Hockey League
- Division: Richardson
- Founded: 1965
- Home arena: Nick Smith Centre
- Colours: Green, yellow, black, white
- Owners: Shift Wellness and Performance
- General manager: Mavric Parks (2022)
- Head coach: Gordie Goldberg (2024)

The Arnprior Packers are a Junior "B" ice hockey team in Arnprior, Ontario. They were also once members of the CJHL (now the CCHL) before joining the Ottawa Valley Junior Hockey League in 1967. Between 2014-15 and the end of the 2019-2020 seasons, the EOJHL and the CCHL set a new agreement in an attempt to create a better player development model. This resulted in the league re-branding itself as the Central Canada Hockey League Tier 2 (CCHL2), and shrinking to 16 teams and two divisions. The league reverted to the Eastern Ontario Junior Hockey League for 2021. According to long-time team trainer and equipment manager (late) Bruce Armsden, each letter represents a company that was in town when the team was formed. P=Playtex A=Arnprior (town of) C= Canadian Public Booth K=Kenwood E=Emergency Measures R= Reid Brothers S=Smiths Construction.

== History ==
The Arnprior Packers have captured 4 Valley Division Championships, the first in 1980, followed by titles in 1995, 1998, and most recently during the 2011-12 season, where they beat the Perth Blue Wings in 5 games. The Packers have also captured 3 Boxing Day Tournament Titles. The Boxing Day Tournament has since been changed to the EOJHL Fall Classic, which the Packers successfully hosted during the 2012-13 Season.

Following the 2021-22 season the league approved the sale of the Packers to the Shift Performance and Wellness organization.

== Season-by-season results ==
Season	GP	W	L	T	OTL	GF	GA	P	Results	Playoffs
1999-00	39	12	24	3	0	139	189	29	5th EO Valley	Lost Preliminary
2000-01	45	16	30	0	2	170	232	34	6th EO Valley	Lost Preliminary
2001-02	40	16	21	3	1	176	189	36	5th EO Valley	Lost Division Final
2002-03	40	19	19	2	4	194	193	44	2nd EO Valley	Lost Division S-final
2003-04	40	11	27	2	1	147	195	25	5th EO Valley	Lost Preliminary
2004-05	40	19	16	4	1	163	148	43	3rd EO Valley	Lost Preliminary
2005-06	40	5	33	2	0	110	226	12	6th EO Valley	Lost Preliminary
2006-07	40	8	28	3	1	142	238	20	6th EO Valley	Lost Division S-final
2007-08	40	7	30	3	0	123	232	17	6th EO Valley	Lost Preliminary
2008-09	40	17	21	2	0	178	209	36	3rd EO Valley	
2009-10	45	21	17	5	2	175	171	49	2nd EO Valley	Lost Division S-Final
2010-11	42	21	18	3	0	176	158	45	2nd EO Valley	Lost Division Final
2011-12	42	31	7	4	0	212	133	66	1st EO Valley	Lost Conference Final
Season	GP	W	L	OTL	SOL	GF	GA	P	Results	Playoffs
2012-13	42	19	21	0	2	175	188	40	4th EO Valley	Lost Division S-Final
2013-14	41	19	19	2	1	133	156	41	3rd EO Valley	Lost Division S-Final
2014-15	40	23	16	1	0	170	154	47	3rd EO Valley	Lost Div. Semi-Final, 3-4 (Rams)
CCHL 2 2020-21 return to EOJHL
2015-16	44	23	19	2	0	166	183	48	5th of 8 Richardson; 9th of 16 CCHL2	Lost Wildcard Series, 1-2 (Aeros)
2016-17	48	33	12	3	0	249	168	69	2 of 8 Richardson; 4th of 16 CCHL2	Lost Quarters, 3-4 (Royals)
2017-18	52	15	34	2	0	148	229	32	2 of 8 Richardson; 14th of 16 CCHL2	Did not qualify
2018-19	44	18	21	4	1	137	208	41	6 of 8 Richardson; 11th of 16 CCHL2	Did not qualify
2019-20	44	22	19	2	1	153	172	47	5 of 8 Richardson; 10th of 16 CCHL2	Won Div. Quarters 2-1 (Timberwolves) incomplete Div. Semi 0-2 (Rideaus)
2020-21	Season lost to covid									
2021-22	42	24	12	2	4	160	133	54	3 of 8 Richardson; 6th of 16 EOJHL	Won Div. Quarters 2-1 (Kings); Lost Div. Semi 2-3 (Blue Wings)
2022-23	42	37	5	0	0	276	103	74	2 of 8 Richardson; 2nd of 16 EOJHL	Won Div. Semifinals 4-1 (Jr. Bears); Lost Div. Finals 0-4 (Blue Wings)
2023-24	44	25	13	4	2	177	158	56	2 of 7 Richardson; 4th of 14 EOJHL	Lost Div. Semifinals 0-4 (Royals)
2024-25	48	16	30	1	1	130	198	34	7 of 7 Richardson; 12th of 13 EOJHL	Did not qualify
2025-26	44	34	10	0	0	221	150	68	1 of 7 Richardson; 3rd of 13 EOJHL	Lost Div. Semifinals 3-4 (Timberwolves)
