= Athens Aeros =

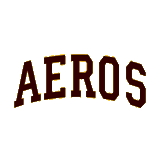
- City: Athens, Ontario, Canada
- League: Eastern Ontario Junior Hockey League
- Division: Rideau
- Founded: 1968
- Home arena: Centre 76 Arena
- Colours: Burgundy, White, and Gold
- General manager: Pete Johnson & Micheal Seed

Franchise history
- 1968–1975: Athens Flyers
- 1975–present: Athens Aeros

The Athens Aeros are a Canadian Junior ice hockey team in Athens, Ontario. They play in the Eastern Ontario Junior Hockey League. A over 50 year-old franchise, with a never ending feed of talented young hockey players moving through the program. The Aeros finished the 2019-20 campaign 0-44, and held a 48 game losing streak before a 6-3 win on October 6, 2021. Since the 2021 season they have bounced back for the better with a 112-88-13-7 record to show for the last 5 seasons.

== Season-by-season results ==
Season	GP	W	L	T	OTL	GF	GA	P	Results	Playoffs
1999-00	42	2	38	2	-	82	285	10	5th EO Rideau	DNQ
2000-01	44	22	18	4	-	228	206	48	2nd EO Rideau	Lost Division S-final
2001-02	44	14	29	1	-	165	212	31	4th EO Rideau	Lost Division S-final
2002-03	44	19	9	3	3	229	220	44	4th EO Rideau	Lost Division S-final
2003-04	44	6	31	4	3	153	249	19	5th EO Rideau	DNQ
2004-05	44	7	35	1	1	127	259	16	5th EO Rideau	DNQ
2005-06	42	7	32	2	1	164	308	17	5th EO Rideau	DNQ
2006-07	44	13	26	5	0	169	229	31	4th EO Rideau	Lost division final
2007-08	42	27	10	4	1	193	144	59	1st EO Rideau	Lost Conference Final
2008-09	42	26	9	4	3	220	170	59	1st EO Rideau	
2009-10	44	28	11	4	1	235	160	61	2nd EO Rideau	Lost semi-final
2010-11	46	38	7	0	1	279	138	77	1st EO Rideau	Lost semi-final
2011-12	46	30	11	0	5	277	148	65	2nd EO Rideau	Lost semi-final
2012-13	46	30	14	1	1	189	148	62	1st EO Rideau	Lost final
2013-14	45	21	18	3	3	169	170	48	3rd EO Rideau	Lost Division Semi-final
2014-15	44	17	20	3	4	141	144	41	3rd EO Rideau	Lost div. semi-final, 0-4 (Tikis)

CCHL 2 return to EOJHL 2020-21
2015-16	44	24	18	2	0	155	163	50	4th of 8 Richardson; 8th of 16 CCHL2	Won Wild Card Series, 2-1 (Packers; Lost quarters (0-4) (Blue Wings)
2016-17	48	24	15	4	5	203	173	57	4 of 8 Richardson; 7th of 16 CCHL2	Won Wild Card Series, 2-1 (Rideaus); Won quarters, 4-3 (Blue Wings); Lost semifinals, 2-4 (Richmond Royals)
2017-18	52	29	19	3	1	200	191	62	4 of 8 Richardson; 8th of 16 CCHL2	Lost Div Qualifying 0-2 (Timberwolves)
2018-19	43	14	23	5	1	115	183	34	8 of 8 Richardson; 14th of 16 CCHL2	did not qualify for post-season play
2019-20	44	0	40	2	2	87	236	4	8 of 8 Richardson; 16th of 16 CCHL2	did not qualify for post-season play
2020-21	Season lost to covid									
2021-22	42	25	16	0	1	189	146	51	5 of 8 Richardson; 7th of 16 EOJHL	Won Div. Quarter 2-0 (Rideaus); Lost Div. Semi 2-3 (Jr. Canadians)
2022-23	42	26	11	1	0	200	141	53	4 of 8 Richardson; 7th of 16 EOJHL	Won Div. Quarter 2-0 (Tikis); Lost Div. Semi 1-4 (Blue Wings)
2023-24	44	17	17	6	4	132	157	44	5 of 7 Richardson; 8th of 14 EOJHL	Lost Div. Quarter 0-3 (Jr Bears)
2024-25	48	26	19	2	1	174	143	55	3 of 7 Richardson; 6th of 13 EOJHL	Lost Div. Semi 1-4 (Richmond Royals)
2025-26	44	18	21	4	1	129	153	51	5 of 7 Richardson; 8th of 13 EOJHL	Lost wild Card Semi 0-3 (Timberwolves)
