= Brockville Tikis =

Junior ice hockey club

- City: Brockville, Ontario
- League: EOJHL
- Division: Richardson
- Founded: 1967
- Home arena: Brockville Memorial Centre
- Colours
- Owner: Dustin Traylen
- General manager: Rick Mulder
- Head coach: Shannon Storr
- Parent club: Brockville Braves
- Website: brockvillebulldogs.com

The Brockville Tikis Junior B Hockey Club is a junior ice hockey franchise of the Eastern Ontario Junior Hockey League (EOJHL) based in Brockville, Ontario.

== History ==
In 2023, the Tikis were granted a leave of absence pending the sale of the franchise. At the time, the team was expected to move as part of the sale.

In April 2025, the EOJHL announced the Tikis would return for the 2025–26 season rebranded as the Brockville Bulldogs. In June 2025, however, the franchise was expelled from the league.

The franchise was reinstated, as the Brockville Tikis, in 2026 following a three-year absence and organizational restructuring process.

== Season-by-season results ==
Season	GP	W	L	T	OTL	GF	GA	Pts	Results	Playoffs
1999–00	42	20	19	3	—	169	165	46	3rd EO Rideau	Lost Division Semi-final
2000–01	44	19	23	2	—	210	213	40	4th EO Rideau	Lost Division Semi-final
2001–02	44	31	13	0	—	216	134	64	1st EO Rideau	Lost semi-final
2002–03	44	30	7	5	2	254	168	65	1st EO Rideau	Lost final
2003–04	44	27	13	1	3	222	174	58	1st EO Rideau	Lost semi-final
2004–05	44	29	12	2	1	199	145	61	2nd EO Rideau	Lost Division Semi-final
2005–06	42	19	19	2	2	203	169	42	3rd EO Rideau	Lost Division Semi-final
2006–07	44	24	13	5	2	218	159	55	1st EO Rideau	Lost Division Semi-final
2007–08	42	14	21	5	2	167	198	35	5th EO Rideau	Lost Division Semi-final
2008–09	42	18	20	2	2	178	165	40	3rd EO Rideau	Lost Division Semi-final
2009–10	44	23	17	2	2	198	175	50	3rd EO Rideau	Lost Division Semi-final
2010–11	46	15	28	0	3	158	244	33	3rd EO Rideau	Lost Division Semi-final
2011–12	45	1	43	0	1	111	345	3	5th EO Rideau	
2012–13	46	19	24	0	3	145	192	41	4th EO Rideau	
Season	GP	W	L	OTL	SOL	GF	GA	Pts	Results	Playoffs
2013–14	45	14	26	4	1	140	171	33	5th EO Rideau	Did not qualify
2014–15	44	20	20	2	2	132	159	22	2nd EO Rideau	Won Div. Semi-finals, 4–0 (Aeros); Lost Div. Finals, 2–4 (Flyers)
2015–16	44	6	38	0	0	103	245	12	8th of 8, Richardson; 16th of 16, CCHL2	Did not qualify
2016–17	48	17	30	1	0	140	217	35	6th of 8, Richardson; 12th of 16, CCHL2	Did not qualify
2017–18	52	6	43	1	2	125	311	15	8th of 8, Richardson; 16th of 16, CCHL2	Did not qualify
2018–19	44	24	14	6	0	159	138	54	3rd of 8, Richardson; 6th of 16, CCHL2	Lost Div. Semi 1-4 (Blue Wings)
2019–20	44	18	20	4	2	139	150	42	6th of 8, Richardson; 12th of 16, CCHL2	Did not qualify
2020–21	Season cancelled									
2021–22	38	12	23	1	2	95	136	27	7th of 8, Richardson; 14th of 16, EOJHL	Did not qualify
2022–23	42	17	21	3	1	152	174	38	5th of 8, Richardson; 11th of 16, EOJHL	Lost Div. Quarters 0-2 (Aeros)

== Sources ==
- Smith, Ron (25 January 2012). "Tikis insist team staying in Brockville". Ottawa Sun. Postmedia. QMI Agency.
- "Junior hockey brawl results in police escort". CBC Sports. CBC/Radio-Canada. 4 November 2000.
- Kupfer, Matthew (9 October 2021). "Minor hockey logos removed from centre ice over Indigenous imagery". CBC News. CBC/Radio-Canada.
- "Eastern Ontario Junior Hockey League Announces Update on Brockville Franchise". Eastern Ontario Junior Hockey League (Press release). Ottawa, ON. 20 June 2025.
- "Tikis announce Shannon Storr as head coach". Brockville Tikis (Press release). Brockville, ON. 28 June 2026.
