= Whitewater Kings =

Canadian junior ice hockey team

- City: Cobden, Ontario
- League: Eastern Ontario Junior Hockey League
- Founded: 1971
- Home arena: Cobden Astrolab
- Colours: Red, white
- Owner(s): Dale McTavish
- General manager: Kevin Ready (2018–19)
- Head coach: Daryl Faught (2017–18)

Franchise history
- 1971–1982: Cardinal Broncos
- 1983–2013: South Grenville Rangers
- 2013–2017: Prescott Flyers
- 2017–2023: Whitewater Kings

The Whitewater Kings are a Canadian junior ice hockey team from Cobden, Ontario. The Kings play in the Eastern Ontario Junior Hockey League. Between 2014-15 and the end of the 2019-2020 seasons, the EOJHL and the CCHL set a new agreement in an attempt to create a better player development model. This resulted in the league re-branding itself as the Central Canada Hockey League Tier 2 (CCHL2), and shrinking to 16 teams and two divisions. The league reverted to the Eastern Ontario Junior Hockey League for 2021. Prior to the 2017–18 season, the Whitewater Kings were known as the Prescott Flyers that started as a member of the Eastern Ontario Junior Hockey League.

== History ==
The franchise was formed in 1971 as the Cardinal Broncos from Cardinal, Ontario. In the early 1980s, future National Hockey League player Todd Gill started his junior hockey career with the Broncos.

In 1983, the Broncos moved to Grenville County, Ontario and formed the South Grenville Rangers. Finding themselves in the tight Rideau Division of the Eastern Ontario Junior B Hockey League, the Rangers were never able to gain a division title. Very often, in the 2000s, the Rangers were locked out of a playoff berth by their division opponents. In 2005, the Rangers finished 1st in their division with 70 points just to bail out in the first round of the playoffs. In 2006, the Rangers finished 2nd in the Rideau Division with 66 points and made it to the divisional final only to lose.

In the summer of 2013, the Rangers were renamed the Prescott Flyers.

For the 2015–16 season the EOJHL became affiliated with the Central Canada Hockey League with a goal to establish a more linear advancement for players. The EOJHL became the Central Canada Hockey League Tier 2 (CCHL2).

During the 2017 off-season the Flyers franchise was purchased by Dale McTavish and relocated to Cobden, Ontario, to serve as part of the development system for the Pembroke Lumber Kings of the CCHL.

== Season-by-season results ==
Season	GP	W	L	T	OTL	GF	GA	P	Results	Playoffs
1999-00	42	11	29	2	-	139	209	26	4th EO Rideau	Lost Division S-final
2000-01	44	7	33	4	-	108	233	18	5th EO Rideau	DNQ
2001-02	44	9	33	2	-	130	232	21	5th EO Rideau	DNQ
2002-03	44	18	23	2	1	162	209	39	5th EO Rideau	DNQ
2003-04	44	21	19	3	1	189	172	46	4th EO Rideau	Lost Division S-final
2004-05	44	32	6	6	0	231	124	70	1st EO Rideau	Lost Division S-final
2005-06	42	32	8	1	1	264	132	66	2nd EO Rideau	Lost Division Final
2006-07	44	8	33	2	1	148	287	19	5th EO Rideau	DNQ
2007-08	42	20	21	1	0	154	184	41	4th EO Rideau	Lost Preliminary
2008-09	42	11	27	1	3	114	201	26	5th EO Rideau	
2009-10	44	10	30	4	0	151	230	24	5th EO Rideau	DNQ
2010-11	46	13	31	0	2	156	244	28	5th EO Rideau	DNQ
2011-12	46	16	27	0	3	154	223	35	4th EO Rideau	
2012-13	46	14	29	0	3	146	208	31	5th EO Rideau	DNQ
Season	GP	W	L	OTL	SOL	GF	GA	P	Results	Playoffs
2013-14	45	26	19	0	0	159	172	52	2nd EO Rideau	Lost Division Final
2014-15	45	33	7	0	4	164	111	70	1st EO Rideau	Won Div. Semi-Final, 4-2 (Rideaus); Won Div. Final, 4-2 (Tikis); Lost Conf. Final, 0-4 (Vikings)
2015-16	44	10	28	3	3	132	206	26	7th of 8 Richardson; 15th of 16 CCHL2	Did not qualify
2016-17	48	12	29	6	1	150	270	31	7th of 8 Richardson; 14th of 16 CCHL2	Did not qualify
Whitewater Kings
2017-18	52	26	26	0	0	193	211	52	6th of 8 Richardson; 11th of 16 CCHL2	Did not qualify
2018-19	44	14	23	4	3	166	293	35	7th of 8 Richardson; 11th of 16 CCHL2	Did not qualify
2019-20	44	10	29	3	2	166	293	25	7th of 8 Richardson; 14th of 16 CCHL2	Did not qualify
2020-21	Season lost due to covid-19 pandemic									
2021-22	41	16	19	4	2	166	293	38	6th of 8 Richardson; 10th of 16 CCHL2	Won Div. Semi-Quarter, 1-2 (Packers)
2022-23	45	5	36	0	1	101	312	11	7th of 8 Richardson; 15th of 16 CCHL2	Did not qualify
2023-24	Whitewater Kings took a Leave of Absence									

== Notable alumni ==
- Todd Gill
