= Winchester Hawks =

- City: Winchester, Ontario, Canada
- League: Eastern Ontario Junior Hockey League
- Division: Martin
- Founded: 1968
- Home arena: Winchester Arena (Sam Ault Arena)
- Colours: Navy, Grey, Gold,
- Owner: Community Team
- President: Jordan Hodge (2025-Present)
- General manager: Dominic Menard (2018-Present)
- Head coach: Dominic Menard (2025-Present)
- Website: www.winchesterhawks.com

The Winchester Hawks are a Canadian junior ice hockey team from Winchester, Ontario. The Hawks play in the Eastern Ontario Junior Hockey League (EOJHL). Between 2014-15 and the end of the 2019-2020 seasons, the EOJHL and the CCHL set a new agreement in an attempt to create a better player development model. This resulted in the league re-branding itself as the Central Canada Hockey League Tier 2 (CCHL2), and shrinking to 16 teams and two divisions. The league reverted to the Eastern Ontario Junior Hockey League for 2021. Prior to 2015, their league was known as the Eastern Ontario Junior Hockey League of the Hockey Eastern Ontario.

== Season-by-season results ==
Season	GP	W	L	T	OTL	GF	GA	P	Results	Playoffs
1999-00	45	8	36	1	-	125	252	18	6th EO StLawr	DNQ
2000-01	45	17	25	3	-	201	234	37	5th EO StLawr	DNQ
2001-02	45	24	18	3	-	212	205	51	3rd EO StLawr	Lost Division S-final
2002-03	45	14	25	3	3	167	208	34	6th EO StLawr	DNQ
2003-04	45	8	35	1	1	107	254	18	6th EO StLawr	DNQ
2004-05	45	21	18	4	2	206	194	48	4th EO StLawr	Lost Division S-final
2005-06	45	22	18	4	1	182	196	49	4th EO StLawr	Lost Division S-final
2006-07	40	30	9	1	0	225	162	61	2nd EO StLawr	Lost Division S-final
2007-08	41	25	13	2	1	187	130	53	2nd EO StLawr	Lost Division Final
2008-09	42	21	16	3	2	181	175	47	4th EO StLawr	
2009-10	40	18	19	2	1	156	187	39	4th EO StLawr	Lost Division S-Final
2010-11	42	29	11	1	1	217	138	60	3rd EO StLawr	Lost final
2011-12	42	36	4	1	1	251	110	74	1st EO StLawr	
2012-13	41	17	19	0	5	158	168	39	4th EO StLawr	
Season	GP	W	L	OTL	SOL	GF	GA	P	Results	Playoffs
2013-14	41	23	16	0	2	160	177	48	3rd EO StLawr	Lost Division Final
2014-15	40	23	14	2	1	192	164	49	3rd EO StLawr	Won Div. Semifinal, 4-2 (Glens); Lost Div.Final 1-4, (Vikings)
CCHL 2 2020-21 return to EOJHL
Season	GP	W	L	OTL	SOL	GF	GA	P	Results	Playoffs
2015-16	44	17	21	2	4	166	199	40	5th of 8 Martin; 10th of 16 CCHL2	Won 10th Pl tie-breaker, 5-3 gm); Lost Wild Card Series 1-2 (Glens)
2016-17	48	20	24	2	2	162	192	44	5th of 8 Martin Div; 10th of 16 CCHL2	Lost Wildcard Series, 1-2 (Beavers)
2017-18	52	15	36	1	0	125	311	31	8th of 8 Martin Div; 15th of 16 CCHL2	Did not qualify
2018-19	44	15	24	3	2	127	186	35	8th of 8 Martin Div; 13th of 16 CCHL2	Did not qualify
2019-20	44	24	14	5	1	175	165	54	5th of 8 Martin Div; 9th of 16 CCHL2	Lost Div. Quarter 0-2 (Vikings)
2020-21	Season lost to covid									
2021-22	42	26	13	0	3	139	113	55	3rd of 8 Martin Div; 5th of 16 EOJHL	Lost Div. Quarter 0-2 (Canadians)
2022-23	42	19	20	2	1	148	148	41	6th of 8 Martin Div; 10th of 16 EOJHL	Lost Div. Quarter 1-2 (Panthers)
2023-24	44	16	27	1	0	139	179	33	5th of 7 Martin Div; 12th of 14 EOJHL	Lost Div. Quarter 2-3 (Panthers)
2024-25	48	5	37	1	0	241	179	16	6th of 6 Martin Div; 13th of 13 EOJHL	Did not qualify
2025-26	44	19	24	1	0	138	184	39	4th of 6 Martin Div 9th of 13 EOJHL	Won Wild Card 3-1 (Panthers) Lost Div Semis 0-4 (Vikings)
