= Eastern Ontario Junior Hockey League =

Junior ice hockey league in Eastern Ontario, Canada

- Current season or competition: 2026–27
- Countries: Canada
- Region: Eastern Ontario
- Commissioner: Marc Franche
- Former names: RJBHL; EOJBHL; CCHL2
- Founded: 1966
- Divisions: 2
- No. of teams: 14
- Championship: Barkley Cup
- Recent champions: Casselman Vikings (2026)
- Headquarters: Ottawa
- Website: theeojhl.ca

The Eastern Ontario Junior Hockey League is a junior ice hockey league with 14 franchise teams in Eastern Ontario, Canada. The league is sanctioned by Hockey Eastern Ontario and Hockey Canada. It functions as a Junior 'B' farm system to the Junior 'A' Central Canada Hockey League (CCHL). Its teams compete annually for the championship Barkley Cup.

== History ==
The EOJHL was founded in 1966 as the Rideau-St. Lawrence Junior "B" Hockey League. Through a merger with the Upper Ottawa Valley Junior "B" Hockey League and the folding of the Lanark-Renfrew Junior "C" Hockey League, the league had grown to 22 different teams.

For the 2007-08 season, the Kemptville 73's moved from the EOJBHL to the Central Junior A Hockey League. A season later, the EOJBHL sold their franchise rights to the then-owners of the Casselman Stars of the Eastern Ontario Junior C Hockey League and then town of Casselman, Ontario. The new team, the Casselman Vikings, began play in the 2008-09 season.

In May 2009, the league dropped the Junior "B" designation from its name, becoming the Eastern Ontario Junior Hockey League (EOJHL).

For the 2009-10 season, the Carleton Place Kings moved from the EOJHL to the Central Canada Hockey League. The Kings were replaced the same year by the new Almonte Thunder.

In April 2014, the EOJHL Champion Casselman Vikings traveled to Port Hawkesbury, Nova Scotia to compete in the Eastern Canadian Junior B Championship. Cassleman became the first team west of Atlantic Canada to compete in the Don Johnson Memorial Cup tournament since its inception in 1982. Casselman went 6-0-0 and won the championship.

At the beginning of the 2015-16 season, the league changed its name to the CCHL2 and cut down to 16 teams from 22 teams which saw the removal of the Shawville Pontiacs, Akwesasne Wolves, Gananoque Islanders, Almonte Thunder, Morrisburg Lions, and Gatineau Mustangs.

The league consists of two divisions, the Martin Division and Richardson Division. The league offers a 52-game balanced schedule where everyone plays everyone at least once. The two Divisional Playoff champions battle for the Barkley Cup every April.

In March 2017, the Pembroke Lumber Kings (CCHL) announced the purchase of the Prescott Flyers as their CCHL2 affiliate and relocating the team to Cobden and calling them the Whitewater Kings. Also in March, the Carleton Place Canadians (CCHL) announced the purchase of the Clarence Beavers and relocated them to Carleton Place, naming them the Carleton Place Junior Canadians. The Rockland Nationals of the National Capital Junior Hockey League will relocate to Clarence to fill in for the departed Beavers. The Metcalfe Jets will move to the National Capital Junior Hockey League and in return the Embrun Panthers will move up to the CCHL2.

After half a decade as the CCHL2, the league returned to its previous name (EOJHL) ahead of the 2022-23 season.

During the 2023 off-season the Whitewater Kings and Brockville Tikis requested a leave of absence. The 2024 off-season had the Alexandria Glens and Char-Lan Rebels merge and re-brand as the Glengarry Brigade. The Brockville Tikis rebranded as the Brockville Bulldogs and announced its return in the 2025–26 EOJHL season, but was expelled from the league before the season began.. However, the league announced the return of Brockville to the league for the 2026-27 season under the Tikis name.

== Teams ==
Martin Division
Team	Centre	Founded	CCHL Affiliate
Casselman Vikings	Casselman	2008
Embrun Panthers	Embrun	1972
Glengarry Brigade	Alexandria	2024
Ottawa Canadians	Ottawa	1973	Ottawa Jr. Senators
Ottawa West Golden Knights	Ottawa	1983	Nepean Raiders
Richmond Royals	Ottawa	1968
Winchester Hawks	Winchester	1971	Nepean Raiders
Richardson Division
Team	Centre	Founded	CCHL Affiliate
Arnprior Packers	Arnprior	1965
Athens Aeros	Athens	1968
Brockville Tikis	Brockville	1968	Brockville Braves
Carleton Place Jr. Canadians	Carleton Place	1980	Carleton Place Canadians
Perth Blue Wings	Perth	1936
Smiths Falls Jr. Bears	Smiths Falls	1967	Smiths Falls Bears
Renfrew Timberwolves	Renfrew	1987

== Playoff champions ==
There is no National Championship for Junior B hockey in Canada, similar championships are held in Ontario (Sutherland Cup), Western Canada (Keystone Cup), Quebec (Coupe Dodge), and Atlantic Canada (Don Johnson Memorial Cup).

Up until the end of the 2015 playoffs, each team listed is a division champion, both the league champion and finalists are either "Metro/Valley" or "Rideau/St. Lawrence" Conference champions. Bolded are league champions, Italicized are finalists.

The EOJHL became the CCHL2 for the 2015-16 season reducing to just two divisions.

Year	Champion
1967	**Cardinal Broncos**
1968	**Ottawa 67 Bees**
1969	**Renfrew Lions**
1970	**Ottawa 67 Bees**
1971	**Ottawa 67 Bees**
1972	**Metcalfe Jets**
1973	**Gatineau Volants**
1974	**Ottawa 67 Bees**
1975	**Vanier 72s**
1976	**Morrisburg Lions**
1977	**Renfrew Lions**
1978	**Morrisburg Lions**
1979	**South Ottawa Canadians**
1980	**Saint-Isidore Eagles**
1981	**South Ottawa Canadians**
1982	**South Ottawa Canadians**
1983	**Metcalfe Jets**
1984	**Metcalfe Jets**
1985	**Ottawa West Golden Knights**
1986	**Char-Lan Rebels**
1987	**Metcalfe Jets**
**EOJHL D. Arnold Carson Trophy Champions**
Year	Metro	Rideau	St. Lawrence	Valley
1988		Prescott Falcons	Alexandria Glens	**Renfrew Timberwolves**
1989	**South Ottawa Canadians**	Gananoque Platers	Char-Lan Rebels	Renfrew Timberwolves
1990		Gananoque Platers	Alexandria Glens	**Renfrew Timberwolves**
1991	**Navan Grads**	Westport Rideaus	Alexandria Glens	Renfrew Timberwolves
1992		Westport Rideaus	Morrisburg Lions	**Perth Blue Wings**
1993		Athens Aeros	Morrisburg Lions	**Renfrew Timberwolves**
1994	**Clarence Beavers**	Athens Aeros	Morrisburg Lions	Shawville Pontiacs
1995	**Metcalfe Jets**	Gananoque Islanders	Winchester Hawks	Arnprior Packers
1996		Westport Rideaus	Char-Lan Rebels	**Perth Blue Wings**
1997	Metcalfe Jets	Gananoque Islanders	**Kemptville 73's**	Perth Blue Wings
1998	Metcalfe Jets	**Westport Rideaus**	Alexandria Glens	Arnprior Packers
1999	Papineau Voisins	Westport Rideaus	**Kemptville 73's**	Renfrew Timberwolves
2000	**Papineau Voisins**	Westport Rideaus	Kemptville 73's	Renfrew Timberwolves
2001	**Clarence Beavers**	Gananoque Islanders	Kemptville 73's	Carleton Place Kings
2002	**Ottawa West Golden Knights**	Brockville Tikis	Char-Lan Rebels	Goulbourn Royals
2003	**Ottawa West Golden Knights**	Brockville Tikis	Alexandria Glens	Goulbourn Royals
2004	**Metcalfe Jets**	Brockville Tikis	Alexandria Glens	South Ottawa Canadians
2005	**Ottawa West Golden Knights**	Westport Rideaus	Alexandria Glens	Perth Blue Wings
2006	**Ottawa West Golden Knights**	Westport Rideaus	Morrisburg Lions	Shawville Pontiacs
2007	Gatineau Mustangs	Westport Rideaus	**Alexandria Glens**	Stittsville Royals
2008	Ottawa West Golden Knights	Athens Aeros	**Alexandria Glens**	Carleton Place Kings
2009	**Ottawa West Golden Knights**	Gananoque Islanders	Alexandria Glens	Carleton Place Kings
2010	**Ottawa Jr. Canadians**	Athens Aeros	Alexandria Glens	Perth Blue Wings
2011	**Clarence Beavers**	Athens Aeros	Winchester Hawks	Renfrew Timberwolves
2012	Gatineau Mustangs	Athens Aeros	**Casselman Vikings**	Arnprior Packers
2013	**Ottawa Jr. Canadians**	Athens Aeros	Casselman Vikings	Renfrew Timberwolves
2014	Ottawa West Golden Knights	Gananoque Islanders	**Casselman Vikings**	Almonte Thunder
2015	Gatineau Mustangs	Prescott Flyers	**Casselman Vikings**	Stittsville Rams
**CCHL2 Barkley Cup Champions**
Year	Richardson		Martin
2016	Perth Blue Wings		**Casselman Vikings**
2017	Richmond Royals		**Casselman Vikings**
2018	Carleton Place Jr. Canadians		**Casselman Vikings**
2019	**Perth Blue Wings**		Ottawa Canadians
2020	Playoffs cancelled because of the COVID-19 epidemic – Barkley Cup not awarded
**EOJHL Barkley Cup Champions**
Year	Richardson		Martin
2021	Playoffs cancelled because of the COVID-19 epidemic – Barkley Cup not awarded
2022	Perth Blue Wings		**Casselman Vikings**
2023	**Perth Blue Wings**		Casselman Vikings
2024	Carleton Place Jr. Canadians		**Casselman Vikings**
2025	Carleton Place Jr. Canadians		**Ottawa Canadians**
2026	Smiths Falls Jr Bears		**Casselman Vikings**

== Other awards ==
- Gill Trophy, Rideau Division playoff champions
- Alex English Trophy, St. Lawrence Division playoff champions
- Ottawa Nepean Sportsplex Trophy, Metro Division playoff champions
- Carl Foley Trophy, Valley Division playoff champions
- John Shorey Cup, Rideau/St. Lawrence Conference playoff champions
- Dwaine Barkley Trophy, Metro/Valley Conference playoff champions

== Former member teams ==
Team	Centre	Joined	Ceased	Went to
Akwesasne Wolves	Akwesasne, ON	1988	2015	Folded
Alexandria Glens	Alexandria	1967	2024	Merged with Char-Lan to be Glengarry Brigade
Almonte Thunder	Almonte, ON	2009	2015	Folded
Cardinal Broncos	Cardinal, ON	1971	1982	Relocated
Carleton Place Kings	Carleton Place, ON	1969	2009	Joined CCHL
Clarence Beavers	Clarence Creek, ON	1980	2017	Relocated to Carleton Place
Char-Lan Rebels	Williamstown	1979	2024	Merged with Alexandria to be Glengarry Brigade
Gananoque Islanders	Gananoque, ON	1986	2015	Joined EBJCHL
Gatineau Mustangs	Gatineau, QC		2015	Joined QJHL
Goulbourn Royals	Stittsville, ON	1990	2003	Re-Branded Stittsville Royals
Kemptville 73's	Kemptville, ON	1969	2007	Joined CCHL
Metcalfe Jets	Metcalfe, ON	1969	2017	Joined NCJHL
Morrisburg Lions	Morrisburg, ON	1971	2015	Joined NCJHL
Navan Grads	Navan, ON	1974	1991	Joined CCHL
Prescott Falcons	Prescott, ON
Prescott Flyers	Prescott, ON	2013	2017	Relocated to Cobden
St. Isidore Eagles	St. Isidore, ON	1974	1987	Joined EOJCHL
Shawville Pontiacs	Shawville, QC	1986	2015	Folded
South Grenville Rangers	Prescott, ON	1982	2013	Re-Branded Prescott Flyers
Spencerville Bruins	Spencerville, ON
Stittsville Rams	Stittsville, ON	2014	2016	Relocated to Richmond
Stittsville Royals	Stittsville, ON	2003	2014	Re-Branded Stittsville Rams
Westport Rideaus	Westport, ON	1967	2021	Relocated to Smiths Falls
Whitewater Kings	Cobden, ON	2017	2024	Folded (formerly Prescott Flyers)
