= Carleton Place Jr. Canadians =

Ice hockey team in Ontario, Canada

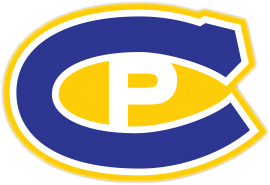
- City: Carleton Place, ON, Canada
- League: Eastern Ontario Junior Hockey League
- Division: Richardson
- Founded: 1980
- Home arena: Carleton Place Arena
- Colours: Blue, white, gold,
- General manager: Norm Racine
- Head coach: Hamish Fraser
- Asst. coach: Robbie McCoy Jeff Hyndman
- Affiliates: Carleton Place Canadians (CCHL)

Franchise history
- 1980-2017: Clarence Beavers
- 2017-present: Carleton Place Jr. Canadians

The Carleton Place Jr. Canadians are a Junior ice hockey team based in Carleton Place, Ontario, Canada. They play in the Eastern Ontario Junior Hockey League (CCHL2). The team was initially founded in 1980 as the Clarence Beavers based in Clarence, Ontario who played in the Eastern Ontario Junior Hockey League.

== History ==
In 2008, the strangest events took place during the Eastern Ontario Junior B Hockey League playoffs opening round against the Ottawa West Golden Knights. Clarence won the series 4-3, but game 7 was voided and had to be replayed because of an officiating error. Clarence Beavers fans dubbed the replay game 7 as "Game 8". Ottawa West won the replayed game and the series 4-3. The series loss was a bitter pill to swallow for the Clarence Beavers hockey club.

In 2017 the Clarence Beaver franchise was purchased by the Carleton Place Canadians (CCHL) and re-located and renamed to the Carleton Place Jr. Canadians in the CCHL2 league as part of their developmental model.

== Season-by-season results ==
Season	GP	W	L	T	OTL	GF	GA	P	Results	Playoffs
1981-82	39	13	21	5	-	194	251	31	5th EO-NWest	
1982-83	36	14	18	4	-	179	202	32	5th EO-AEng	
1983-85	Statistics Not Available									
1985-86	35	14	21	0	-	153	204	28	5th EO-AEng	
1986-87	40	10	26	4	-	179	248	24	4th EO-Metro	
1987-99	Statistics Not Available									
1999-00	42	21	21	0	3	196	195	45	4th EO Metro	Lost Division S-final
2000-01	42	29	15	1	1	205	159	60	1st EO Metro	Won League
2001-02	40	25	12	3	0	167	127	53	2nd EO Metro	Lost Division Final
2002-03	40	20	18	2	1	162	164	43	4th EO Metro	Lost Preliminary
2003-04	40	18	21	1	1	173	176	38	4th EO Metro	Lost Division S-final
2004-05	40	14	19	4	3	190	195	35	5th EO Metro	Lost Division S-final
2005-06	39	31	7	1	0	219	127	63	1st EO Metro	Lost Division Final
2006-07	40	27	12	1	0	210	139	55	1st EO Metro	Lost Division Final
2007-08	40	27	10	0	3	195	139	57	2nd EO Metro	Lost Division Final
2008-09	40	22	15	3	0	184	158	47	3rd EO Metro	Lost Division S-Final
2009-10	44	25	15	2	2	224	185	54	4th EO Metro	Lost Division S-Final
2010-11	42	30	8	3	1	200	118	64	1st EO Metro	Won League
2011-12	42	27	13	1	1	230	178	56	2nd EO Metro	Lost Division S-Final
Season	GP	W	L	OTL	SOL	GF	GA	P	Results	Playoffs
2012-13	42	22	14	3	3	156	142	50	3rd EO Metro	
2013-14	41	25	14	1	1	144	140	52	3rd EO Metro	Lost Division Semi-final
2014-15	40	20	16	1	3	154	141	44	3rd EO Metro	Lost Div. Semi-final, 0-4 (Mustangs)
to the CCHL 2
2015-16	44	--	--	-	-	---	---	--	8th of 8 Martin Div; 14th of 16 CCHL2	Did not qualify
2016-17	48	23	21	2	2	209	218	50	4th of 8 Martin Div; 9th of 16 CCHL2	Won Wild Card Series, 2-1 (Hawks); Lost Quarterfinals, 3-4 (Golden Knights)
Carleton Place Jr Canadians
2017-18	52	37	13	2	0	219	132	76	1st of 8 Richardson; 2nd of 16 CCHL2	Won Div. Semifinal 4-3 (Timberwolves); Won Lea. Semifinals 4-3 (Canadians); Lost League Finals 1-4 (Vikings)
2018-19	44	25	16	1	2	153	128	53	4th 8 Richardson; 7th of 16 CCHL2	Won Div. Semifinal 4-2 (Rideaus); Lost Div. Finals 0-4 (Blue Wings)
2019-20	44	30	13	0	1	230	120	63	2nd 8 Richardson; 5th of 16 CCHL2	Incomplete Div. Semifinal 1-1 (Blue Wings); Remaining playoffs cancelled
2020-21	Season lost to covid									
CCHL 2 - returned to EOJHL 2020-21 season
2022-23	42	15	22	3	2	144	156	35	6th of 8 Richardson; 12th of 16 EOJHL	Lost Div. Quarterfinal 0-2 (Jr Bears)
2023-24	44	32	9	3	0	143	101	65	1st of 7 Richardson; 3rd of 14 EOJHL	Won Div. Semifinal 4-1 (Jr Bears); Won Div. Finals. 4-3 (Richmond Royals); Lost League Finals 2-4 (Vikings)
2024-25	48	24	19	3	2	172	178	53	4 of 7 Richardson; 7th of 13 EOJHL	Won Wildcard Rd 3-1 (Jr Bears); Won Div. Semifinal 4-1 (Timberwolves); Won Div. Finals. 4-1 (Royals); Lost League Finals 2-4 (Canadians)
2025-26	44	10	31	3	0	112	220	23	7 of 7 Richardson; 13th of 13 EOJHL	Did Not Qualify

== Notable alumni ==
- Benoît Pouliot
