= Almonte Thunder =

Junior ice hockey team in Almonte, Ontario

- City: Almonte, Ontario, Canada
- League: Eastern Ontario Junior Hockey League
- Division: Valley
- Founded: 2009
- Folded: 2015
- Home arena: Almonte Community Center Arena
- Colours: Red, black, white
- General manager: Jeff Hawkins
- Head coach: Bill White

The Almonte Thunder were a Canadian Junior B ice hockey team based in Almonte, Ontario. They played in the Eastern Ontario Junior Hockey League.

== History ==
The Almonte Thunder were granted expansion into the Eastern Ontario Junior Hockey League in 2009, replacing the Carleton Place Kings were promoted to the Junior A Central Junior Hockey League.

At the conclusion of the 2014-15 season, EOJHL announced it was re-organizing to be more of a direct developmental league to the Central Canada Hockey League and renamed the league Central Canada Hockey League Tier 2. The league shrunk from 22 to 16 teams, eliminating 6 of the 2014-15 franchises, including the Thunder (along with the Akwesasne Wolves, Gananoque Islanders, Gatineau Mustangs, Morrisburg Lions, and Shawville Pontiacs).

== Season-by-season results ==
Season	GP	W	L	T	OTL	GF	GA	P	Results	Playoffs
2009-10	45	16	27	2	0	136	230	34	4th EO Valley	Lost Division S-Final
2010-11	42	21	18	2	1	165	163	45	3rd EO Valley	Lost Division S-Final
2011-12	42	15	19	5	3	186	212	38	3rd EO Valley	
Season	GP	W	L	OTL	SOL	GF	GA	P	Results	Playoffs
2012-13	41	15	22	3	1	137	183	34	5th EO Valley	DNQ
2013-14	41	18	16	2	5	149	171	43	2nd EO Valley	Lost Conf. Final
2014-15	40	11	27	1	1	121	217	24	5th EO Valley	did not qualify
