= Akwesasne Wolves =

Junior ice hockey team in Ontario, Canada

- City: Akwesasne, Ontario, Canada
- League: Eastern Ontario Junior Hockey League
- Division: St. Lawrence
- Operated: 1998–2015
- Home arena: Aʼnowaraʼko:wa Arena
- Colours: Black, Purple, Grey, and White
- President: Gloria Thompson
- General manager: Steve Viezel
- Head coach: Steve Viezel

The Akwesasne Wolves were a Junior ice hockey team in Kawehnò:ke District, Akwesasne. They played in the Eastern Ontario Junior Hockey League until the end of the 2014–15 season.

== History ==
At the conclusion of the 2014–15 season the league announced it was re-organizing to be more of feeder league to the Central Canada Hockey League and renamed the league Central Canada Hockey League Tier 2. Originally the Eastern Ontario Junior Hockey league was to reduce to twelve teams, however it was only reduced to 16 teams, eliminating 6 of the current franchises, including the Wolves, Morrisburg Lions, Almonte Thunder, Gananoque Islanders, Gatineau Mustangs and Shawville Pontiacs.

== Season-by-season results ==
Season	GP	W	L	T	OTL	GF	GA	P	Results	Playoffs
1999-2000	45	21	18	6	-	180	166	51	3rd EO StLawr	Lost Division S-final
2000-01	45	7	35	3	-	155	257	17	6th EO StLawr	DNQ
2001-02	45	7	34	4	-	158	273	21	6th EO StLawr	DNQ
2002-03	45	18	23	3	1	200	221	40	5th EO StLawr	DNQ
2003-04	45	20	20	2	3	189	162	45	4th EO StLawr	Lost Division S-final
2004-05	45	21	21	2	1	180	171	45	5th EO StLawr	DNQ
2005-06	45	1	42	1	1	136	375	4	6th EO StLawr	DNQ
2006-07	40	9	27	2	2	154	257	22	5th EO StLawr	DNQ
2007-08	41	5	32	3	1	114	202	14	5th EO StLawr	Lost preliminary
2008-09	Did Not Participate									
2009-10	40	4	32	2	2	140	284	12	6th EO StLawr	DNQ
2010-11	42	12	24	1	5	164	218	30	5th EO StLawr	DNQ
2011-12	42	9	30	1	2	123	230	21	6th EO StLawr	DNQ
2012-13	41	21	17	0	3	148	142	45	3rd EO StLawr	Lost Div. Final
2013-14	41	22	18	1	0	145	139	45	4th EO StLawr	Lost div. semi-final
2014-15	39	13	21	4	1	110	162	31	5th EO StLawr	DNQ
