= Gatineau Nomad =

- City: Buckingham, Quebec, Canada
- League: Quebec Junior Hockey League
- Division: Trévi
- Founded: 1997
- Home arena: Centre Sportif de Buckingham
- Colours: White, black, silver
- Owner: AJ Plant
- General manager: Francois Cyr
- Head coach: Francois Cyr

Franchise history
- 1997–2002: Papineau Neighbours
- 2002–2003: Buckingham Mustangs
- 2003–2015: Gatineau Mustangs
- 2015–2026: Gatineau Flames
- 2026–Present: Gatineau Nomad

The Nomad de Gatineau or the Gatineau Nomad are a Canadian junior ice hockey team based in Buckingham, Quebec. The team is a member of the Quebec Junior Hockey League, but was a member of the Eastern Ontario Junior Hockey League for decades, ending in 2015.

Former Gatineau Mustangs logo

== History ==
Originally known as the Voisins de Papineau (Papineau Neighbours), the Neighbours lost in the 1999 final and won the 2000 Eastern Ontario Junior "B" title, despite being from the Province of Quebec. In 2002, the team became the Buckingham Mustangs. In 2003, the team expanded their name by becoming the Gatineau Mustangs.

In 2006, the Mustangs hosted the 2006 Coupe Dodge, the Hockey Quebec Junior "AA" championships. Coming in, the Mustangs defeated Les Rebels de Trois-Pistoles 4-3, and then beat the Express de Suroît 6-5. In the first elimination round the Mustangs were defeated by the eventual finalist, Marquis de Jonquière, in an 8-5 heartbreaker.

At the conclusion of the 2014–15 season, the league announced it was re-organizing to become more of a dedicated developmental league to the Central Canada Hockey League and renamed the league Central Canada Hockey League Tier 2. Initially, the league was to downsize to twelve teams (one feeder club for each Tier 1 team), however it reduced to 16 teams, eliminating six of the current franchises, including the Akwesasne Wolves, Morrisburg Lions, Almonte Thunder, Gananoque Islanders, Gatineau Mustangs and Shawville Pontiacs.

In May 2015, Gatineau announced they were joining the Quebec Junior Hockey League by purchasing the Lachine Maroons franchise and re-locating it to Buckingham. They were forced to change their name to the Flames, as the Vaudreuil-Dorion Mustangs were existing members of the QJHL. in June 2026, the Flames were rebranded to the Gatineau Nomad for a fresh, modern image and new identity.

== Season-by-season results ==
Season	GP	W	L	T	OTL	GF	GA	P	Results	Playoffs
1999-00	42	28	13	1	1	210	160	59	1st EO Metro	Won League
2000-01	42	25	16	3	1	153	151	54	4th EO Metro	Lost preliminary
2001-02	40	9	29	2	0	124	205	20	5th EO Metro	Lost preliminary
2002-03	40	21	16	3	1	195	162	46	3rd EO Metro	Lost division final
2003-04	40	28	11	1	3	235	163	60	2nd EO Metro	Lost division final
2004-05	40	16	20	2	2	153	225	36	4th EO Metro	Lost preliminary
2005-06	40	11	25	1	3	162	225	26	5th EO Metro	Lost preliminary
2006-07	40	25	14	0	1	229	164	51	2nd EO Metro	Lost final
2007-08	39	28	8	1	2	238	121	59	1st EO Metro	Lost division S-final
2008-09	40	15	20	3	2	162	201	35	4th EO Metro	
2009-10	44	27	14	2	1	217	155	57	3rd EO Metro	Lost division S-final
2010-11	42	14	26	1	1	138	154	30	5th EO Metro	DNQ
2011-12	42	28	7	6	1	217	141	63	1st EO Metro	Lost final
2012-13	41	27	11	-	2	199	117	57	2nd EO Metro	
2013-14	41	21	15	-	5	180	166	47	4th EO Metro	
2014-15	40	23	16	-	1	186	159	47	4th EO Metro	Won div. semi-final, 4-0 (Beavers); Won div. finals, 4-2 (Golden Knights); Lost conference, 2-4 (Rams)
2015-16	55	7	42	6	0	192	318	20	6 of 6 St Louis; 12 of 12 QJHL	DNQ
2016-17	49	15	28	4	2	206	283	36	6 of 6 St Louis; 10 of 12 QJHL	DNQ
2017-18	49	28	16	3	2	220	218	61	3 of 6 St Louis; 5 of 12 QJHL	Lost Div. quarterfinal, 2-4 (Panthers)
2018-19	48	16	30	-	2	164	236	34	11 of 13 QJHL	DNQ
2019-20	48	12	34	-	2	154	260	26	6th Trévi	DNQ
2020-21	Season lost due to COVID-19 restrictions									
2021-22	42	11	29	2	0	24	150	277	4th of 4 North; 11th of 12 QJHL	DNQ
2022-23	48	17	28	2	2	38	177	228	11th of 13 QJHL	DNQ
2023-24	48	14	28	4	2	38	177	228	11th of 13 QJHL	DNQ
2024-25	48	18	27	3	2	39	204	250	11th of 13 QJHL	DNQ
