= List of ice hockey teams in Ontario =

This is a list of ice hockey teams that compete in Ontario. This list includes active professional, university, and junior men's ice hockey teams.

== Alphabetical list of teams ==
The leagues are correct for the 2024–25 season.

=== A ===
Team	League
Alliston Hornets	Provincial Junior Hockey League
Almaguin Spartans	Greater Metro Junior A Hockey League
Almonte Inferno	National Capital Junior Hockey League
Amherstburg Admirals	Provincial Junior Hockey League
Arnprior Packers	Eastern Ontario Junior Hockey League
Athens Aeros	Eastern Ontario Junior Hockey League
Aurora Tigers	Ontario Junior Hockey League
Aylmer Spitfires	Provincial Junior Hockey League
Ayr Centennials	Greater Ontario Hockey League

=== B ===
Team	League
Barrie Colts	Ontario Hockey League
Belleville Senators	American Hockey League
Blenheim Blades	Provincial Junior Hockey League
Blind River Beavers	Northern Ontario Junior Hockey League
Bradford Bulls	Greater Metro Junior A Hockey League
Bradford Rattlers	Greater Metro Junior A Hockey League
Brampton Steelheads	Ontario Hockey League
Brantford Bulldogs	Ontario Hockey League
Brantford Titans	Greater Ontario Hockey League
Brock Badgers	Ontario University Athletics
Brockville Braves	Central Canada Hockey League
Burlington Cougars	Ontario Junior Hockey League

=== C ===
Team	League
Caledon Admirals	Ontario Junior Hockey League
Caledon Bombers	Greater Ontario Hockey League
Caledon Golden Knights	Provincial Junior Hockey League
Caledonia Corvairs	Greater Ontario Hockey League
Cambridge Redhawks	Greater Ontario Hockey League
Carleton Place Canadians	Central Canada Hockey League
Carleton Place Jr. Canadians	Eastern Ontario Junior Hockey League
Carleton Ravens	Ontario University Athletics
Casselman Vikings	Eastern Ontario Junior Hockey League
Chatham Maroons	Greater Ontario Hockey League
Clarington Eagles	Provincial Junior Hockey League
Cobourg Cougars	Ontario Junior Hockey League
Collingwood Blues	Ontario Junior Hockey League
Cornwall Colts	Central Canada Hockey League
Cumberland Castors	National Capital Junior Hockey League
Current River Storm	Lakehead Junior Hockey League

=== D ===
Team	League
Dorchester Dolphins	Provincial Junior Hockey League
Dresden Jr. Kings	Provincial Junior Hockey League
Dryden Ice Dogs	Superior International Junior Hockey League
Dundas Blues	Provincial Junior Hockey League
Dunnville Jr. Mudcats	Provincial Junior Hockey League
Durham Roadrunners	Greater Metro Junior A Hockey League

=== E ===
Team	League
Elliot Lake Vikings	Northern Ontario Junior Hockey League
Elmira Sugar Kings	Greater Ontario Hockey League
Embrun Panthers	Eastern Ontario Junior Hockey League
Espanola Paper Kings	Northern Ontario Junior Hockey League
Essex 73's	Provincial Junior Hockey League
Exeter Hawks	Provincial Junior Hockey League

=== F ===
Team	League
Fergus Whalers	Provincial Junior Hockey League
Fort Erie Meteors	Greater Ontario Hockey League
Fort Frances Lakers	Superior International Junior Hockey League
Frankford Huskies	Provincial Junior Hockey League
French River Rapids	Northern Ontario Junior Hockey League

=== G ===
Team	League
Georgetown Raiders	Ontario Junior Hockey League
Georgina Ice	Provincial Junior Hockey League
Glanbrook Rangers	Provincial Junior Hockey League
Glengarry Brigade	Eastern Ontario Junior Hockey League
Goderich Flyers	Provincial Junior Hockey League
Grimsby Peach Kings	Provincial Junior Hockey League
Guelph Gryphons	Ontario University Athletics
Guelph Storm	Ontario Hockey League

=== H ===
Team	League
Hagersville Hawks	Provincial Junior Hockey League
Haliburton County Huskies	Ontario Junior Hockey League
Hamilton Hammers	American Hockey League
Hamilton Havoc	Professional Women's Hockey League
Hamilton Steel	Greater Ontario Hockey League
Hanover Barons	Provincial Junior Hockey League
Hawkesbury Hawks	Central Canada Hockey League
Hearst Lumberjacks	Northern Ontario Junior Hockey League
Hespeler Shamrocks	Provincial Junior Hockey League
Huntsville Otters	Provincial Junior Hockey League

=== I ===
Team	League
Innisfil Spartans	Provincial Junior Hockey League
Iroquois Falls Storm	Northern Ontario Junior Hockey League

=== K ===
Team	League
Kam River Fighting Walleye	Superior International Junior Hockey League
Kemptville 73's	Central Canada Hockey League
Kenora Islanders	Superior International Junior Hockey League
Kincardine Bulldogs	Provincial Junior Hockey League
King Rebellion	Ontario Junior Hockey League
Kingston Frontenacs	Ontario Hockey League
Kirkland Lake Gold Miners	Northern Ontario Junior Hockey League
Kitchener Rangers	Ontario Hockey League
Kitchener-Waterloo Siskins	Greater Ontario Hockey League
Komoka Kings	Greater Ontario Hockey League

=== L ===
Team	League
Lakefield Chiefs	Provincial Junior Hockey League
Lakehead Thunderwolves	Ontario University Athletics
Lakeshore Canadiens	Provincial Junior Hockey League
LaSalle Vipers	Greater Ontario Hockey League
Laurentian Voyageurs	Ontario University Athletics
Leamington Flyers	Ontario Junior Hockey League
Lindsay Muskies	Ontario Junior Hockey League
Listowel Cyclones	Greater Ontario Hockey League
Little Britain Merchants	Provincial Junior Hockey League
London Knights	Ontario Hockey League
London Nationals	Greater Ontario Hockey League
Lucan Irish	Provincial Junior Hockey League

=== M ===
Team	League
Markham Royals	Ontario Junior Hockey League
Meaford Knights	Greater Metro Junior A Hockey League
Metcalf Jets	National Capital Junior Hockey League
Midland Flyers	Provincial Junior Hockey League
Milton Menace	Ontario Junior Hockey League
Mississauga Chargers	Ontario Junior Hockey League
Mitchell Hawks	Provincial Junior Hockey League
Mooretown Flags	Provincial Junior Hockey League
Morrisburg Lions	National Capital Junior Hockey League
Mount Brydges Bulldogs	Provincial Junior Hockey League
Mount Forest Patriots	Provincial Junior Hockey League
Muskoka Bears	Provincial Junior Hockey League

=== N ===
Team	League
Napanee Raiders	Provincial Junior Hockey League
Navan Grads	Central Canada Hockey League
Nepean Raiders	Central Canada Hockey League
New Hamburg Firebirds	Provincial Junior Hockey League
Newmarket Hurricanes	Ontario Junior Hockey League
Niagara Falls Canucks	Ontario Junior Hockey League
Niagara IceDogs	Ontario Hockey League
Niagara Predators	Greater Metro Junior A Hockey League
Niagara Riverhawks	Provincial Junior Hockey League
Nipigon Elks	Lakehead Junior Hockey League
Nipissing Lakers	Ontario University Athletics
North Bay Battalion	Ontario Hockey League
North Dundas Rockets	National Capital Junior Hockey League
North Kawartha Knights	Provincial Junior Hockey League
North Middlesex Stars	Provincial Junior Hockey League
North York Rangers	Ontario Junior Hockey League
North York Renegades	Greater Metro Junior A Hockey League
Northumberland Stars	Greater Metro Junior A Hockey League
Norwich Merchants	Provincial Junior Hockey League

=== O ===
Team	League
Oakville Blades	Ontario Junior Hockey League
Ontario Tech Ridgebacks	Ontario University Athletics
Orillia Terriers	Provincial Junior Hockey League
Oshawa Generals	Ontario Hockey League
Ottawa 67's	Ontario Hockey League
Ottawa Canadians	Eastern Ontario Junior Hockey League
Ottawa Charge	Professional Women's Hockey League
Ottawa Gee-Gees	Ontario University Athletics
Ottawa Jr. Senators	Central Canada Hockey League
Ottawa Senators	National Hockey League
Ottawa West Golden Knights	Eastern Ontario Junior Hockey League
Owen Sound Attack	Ontario Hockey League

=== P ===
Team	League
Paris Titans	Provincial Junior Hockey League
Pelham Panthers	Greater Ontario Hockey League
Pembroke Lumber Kings	Central Canada Hockey League
Penetang Kings	Provincial Junior Hockey League
Perth Blue Wings	Eastern Ontario Junior Hockey League
Peterborough Petes	Ontario Hockey League
Petrolia Flyers	Provincial Junior Hockey League
Pickering Panthers	Ontario Junior Hockey League
Picton Pirates	Provincial Junior Hockey League
Port Colborne Sailors	Greater Ontario Hockey League
Port Dover Sailors	Provincial Junior Hockey League
Port Hope Panthers	Provincial Junior Hockey League
Port Perry Lumberjacks	Provincial Junior Hockey League
Port Stanley Sailors	Provincial Junior Hockey League
Powassan Voodoos	Northern Ontario Junior Hockey League

=== Q ===
Team	League
Queen's Golden Gaels	Ontario University Athletics

=== R ===
Team	League
Red Lake Miners	Superior International Junior Hockey League
Renfrew Wolves	Central Canada Hockey League
Richmond Hill Rampage	Greater Metro Junior A Hockey League
Richmond Royals	Eastern Ontario Junior Hockey League
RMC Paladins	Ontario University Athletics
Rockland Nationals	Central Canada Hockey League
Ryerson Rams	Ontario University Athletics

=== S ===
Team	League
Sarnia Sting	Ontario Hockey League
Sault Ste. Marie Greyhounds	Ontario Hockey League
Schomberg Cougars	Provincial Junior Hockey League
Schreiber Falcons	Lakehead Junior Hockey League
Sioux Lookout Bombers	Superior International Junior Hockey League
Smiths Falls Bears	Central Canada Hockey League
Smiths Falls Jr. Bears	Eastern Ontario Junior Hockey League
Soo Thunderbirds	Northern Ontario Junior Hockey League
South Grenville Rangers	National Capital Junior Hockey League
St-Isidore Eagles	National Capital Junior Hockey League
St. Catharines Falcons	Greater Ontario Hockey League
St. George Ravens	Greater Metro Junior A Hockey League
St. Marys Lincolns	Greater Ontario Hockey League
St. Michael's Buzzers	Ontario Junior Hockey League
St. Thomas Stars	Greater Ontario Hockey League
Stayner Siskins	Provincial Junior Hockey League
Stouffville Spirit	Ontario Junior Hockey League
Stratford Warriors	Greater Ontario Hockey League
Strathroy Rockets	Greater Ontario Hockey League
Streetsville Derbys	Provincial Junior Hockey League
Sudbury Wolves	Ontario Hockey League

=== T ===
Team	League
Tavistock Braves	Provincial Junior Hockey League
Thamesford Trojans	Provincial Junior Hockey League
Thunder Bay Bandits	Lakehead Junior Hockey League
Thunder Bay North Stars	Superior International Junior Hockey League
Thunder Bay Northern Hawks	Lakehead Junior Hockey League
Timmins Rock	Northern Ontario Junior Hockey League
Toronto Flyers	Greater Metro Junior A Hockey League
Toronto Maple Leafs	National Hockey League
Toronto Marlies	American Hockey League
Toronto Patriots	Ontario Junior Hockey League
Toronto Scepters	Professional Women's Hockey League
Toronto Varsity Blues	Ontario University Athletics
Tottenham Railers	Greater Metro Junior A Hockey League
Trent Hills Thunder	Provincial Junior Hockey League
Trenton Golden Hawks	Ontario Junior Hockey League

=== U ===
Team	League
Uxbridge Bruins	Provincial Junior Hockey League

=== V ===
Team	League
Valley Timberwolves	Eastern Ontario Junior Hockey League
Vankleek Hill Cougars	National Capital Junior Hockey League

=== W ===
Team	League
Walkerton Capitals	Provincial Junior Hockey League
Walpole Island Wild	Provincial Junior Hockey League
Wasaga River Dragons	Greater Metro Junior A Hockey League
Waterloo Warriors	Ontario University Athletics
Welland Jr. Canadians	Greater Ontario Hockey League
Wellesley Applejacks	Provincial Junior Hockey League
Wellington Dukes	Ontario Junior Hockey League
West Nipissing Lynx	Greater Metro Junior A Hockey League
Western Mustangs	Ontario University Athletics
Westport Rideaus	National Capital Junior Hockey League
Wheatley Sharks	Provincial Junior Hockey League
Wilfrid Laurier Golden Hawks	Ontario University Athletics
Winchester Hawks	Eastern Ontario Junior Hockey League
Windsor Lancers	Ontario University Athletics
Windsor Spitfires	Ontario Hockey League
Wingham Ironmen	Provincial Junior Hockey League
Woodstock Navy-Vets	Provincial Junior Hockey League

=== Y ===
Team	League
York Lions	Ontario University Athletics

== See also ==
- List of women's ice hockey teams in Ontario
