= South Grenville Jr C Rangers =

Junior ice hockey team in Prescott, ON, Canada

South Grenville Rangers
- City: Prescott, Ontario
- League: National Capital Junior Hockey League
- Division: West
- Founded: 2017
- Home arena: Ingredion Centre
- Colours: Blue, red and white
- General manager: Lucas Stitt (2018-19)
- Head coach: Ron Harrison (2018-19)
- Website: http://southgrenvillerangers.com

Franchise history
- 2017–present: South Grenville Rangers

The South Grenville Rangers are a junior ice hockey team based in Prescott, Ontario. They play in the National Capital Junior Hockey League.

== History ==
On April 24, 2017, a franchise was awarded to Prescott, Ontario to start play in the 2017-18 season along with three other new franchises. Their home arena would be the Leo Boivin Community Centre.

On February 24, 2018, the Rangers would play their first playoff game against the Papineau Vikings. The team lost the series 4-0.

On August 21, 2019, the team's home arena would be shut down due to an ammonia leak in the ice plant, forcing the team to move to the Ingredion Centre in Cardinal, Ontario.

On February 17, 2019, the team became the East Division champions for the first time in franchise history.

On February 23, 2019, the team made the playoffs two years in a row.

On March 1, 2019, the team won their first playoff series 4-0.

== Season-by-season record ==
Note: GP = Games Played, W = Wins, L = Losses, T = Ties, OTL = Overtime Losses, GF = Goals for, GA = Goals against

Season	GP	W	L	T	OTL	GF	GA	Pts	Finish	Playoffs
2017-18	33	9	22	2	5	96	140	20	10th of 12, NCJHL	Lost to Vikings 4-0
2018-19	36	24	8	3	1	166	99	50	1st of 5 West 3rd of 10, NCJHL	Beat Jets 4-0 Lost to Cougars 4-2
2020-21	Covid									
2021-22	24	16	5	3	-	112	63	35	2nd of 9 NCJHL	Won Quarterfinals (3-2)(Lions); Won Semifinals (4-2) Rockets; Lost Finals, (0-4) (Castors)
2022-23	35	26	6	2	1	177	101	55	1st of 10 NCJHL	Won Quarterfinals (3-1)(Infernos); Lost Semifinals (3-4) (Hull-Volant)
2023-24	33	12	17	1	3	119	125	28	8th of 10 NCJHL	Lost Quarterfinals (0-4) (Hull-Volant)
2024-25	34	7	26	0	1	82	168	15	10th of 10 NCJHL	Did Not Qualify
2025-26	32	17	2613	1	1	136	119	36	5th of 9 NCJHL	Won Quarterfinals 4-2 (Eagles); Lost Semifinals 0-4 (Cougars)
