= Ottawa Valley Lightning =

- League: National Capital Junior Hockey League
- Founded: 1998
- Folded: 2019
- Colours: Blue, white, green
- General manager: Mario Therrien
- Head coach: Yann Neveu

Franchise history
- 1998–2010: Maxville Mustangs
- 2010–2017: Papineauville Vikings
- 2017–2018: Papineau Vikings
- Possibly 2019: Ottawa Valley Lightning

The Ottawa Valley Lightning were a junior C ice hockey team in the National Capital Junior Hockey League of Hockey Eastern Ontario. As of the 2018–19 season, the team is inactive.

== History ==
The Maxville Mustangs were founded in 1998. In 2010, the Mustangs were sold to investors in Papineauville, Quebec, and became the Vikings. In 2016, the Vikings won their second consecutive NCJHL championship with a seventh game victory over the Embrun Panthers for the second consecutive year. After the 2016–17 season, the team announced that they were moving to St-André-Avellin, Quebec and play out of that local arena. As part of the relocation, the team also changed their name to Papineau Vikings. In 2018, the Vikings won their third championship in four years by defeating the North Dundas Rockets in seven games.

The franchise was sold in May 2018 and planned to relocated to Stittsville, Ontario, and rebranded as the Valley Golden Kings. However, they subsequently announced the team would be the Ottawa Valley Lightning and but did not name a home location. On 25 July 2018, the NCJHL announced the franchise would sit out the 2018–19 season entirely.

== Season-by-season record ==
Note: GP = Games Played, W = Wins, L = Losses, T = Ties, OTL = Overtime Losses, GF = Goals for, GA = Goals against, Pts = Points

Season	GP	W	L	T	OTL	GF	GA	Pts	Finish	Playoffs
2004–05	36	5	30	0	1	82	246	11	7th EOJCHL	Lost quarter-final
2005–06	36	10	22	—	4	151	211	24	6th EOJCHL	Lost quarter-final
2006–07	34	18	12	—	4	170	151	40	4th EOJCHL	Lost Division Semi-final
2007–08	36	11	23	—	2	120	185	24	6th EOJCHL	Lost quarter-final
2008–09	34	14	19	—	1	160	191	29	6th EOJCHL	Lost Division Semi-final
2009–10	34	13	17	—	4	142	171	30	6th EOJCHL	Lost quarter-final
2010–11	34	11	20	—	3	104	148	25	7th NCJHL	Lost quarter-final
2011–12	32	8	24	—	0	95	149	16	9th NCJHL	Folded
2012–13	34	17	15	—	2	132	122	36	4th NCJHL	Lost quarter-final
2013–14	32	26	5	—	1	173	106	53	1st NCJHL	Lost semi-final
2014–15	32	23	6	—	3	191	116	49	2nd NCJHL	Won quarter-finals, 4–1 (Rockets); Won semi-finals, 4–1 (Eagles); Won finals, 4–3 (Panthers)
2015–16	34	25	7	—	2	180	104	52	1st of 5, North; 2nd of 10, NCJHL	Won Div. Semi-finals, 4–1 (Bandits); Won Div. Finals, 4–0 (Volants); Won finals, 4–3 (Panthers)
2016–17	32	20	12	0	—	163	105	40	2nd of 9, NCJHL	Lost quarter-finals, 3–4 (Volants)
2017–18	33	25	8	—	—	203	85	50	1st of 12, NCJHL	Won quarter-finals, 4–0 (Rangers); Won Div. Semi-finals, 4–2 (Castors); Won League Finals, 4–3 (Rockets)

== Individual player awards ==
Season	Name	Award
2017-18	Jacob Osborne	Top Scorer
2012-13	Benoit Lavigne	Rookie of the Year
	Kevin Mallette	Best Goaltender
	Maxime Roussel	Best Defensive Forward
2008-09	Adam Larivière	Best Defensive Forward
2007-08	Adam Larivière	Most Improved Player
2006-07	Shane O’Brien	Top Scorer
	Shane O’Brien	Regular Season MVP
	Trevor Jacquard	Coach of the Year
	Ian Henderson	Executive of the Year
2005-06	Steven Stewart	Most Improved Player
	Ian Henderson	Executive of the Year
2003-04	Shane O’Brien	Rookie of the Year
2001-02	Nick Adam	Rookie of the Year

== Mustangs individual records ==
=== Regular season ===
==== Players ====
- Most Goals - Game
  - 5 - Steven Knapp (Feb 13/09 vs. East Ottawa Thunder)
- Most Goals – Season
  - 35 - Shane O'Brien(2006–2007)
- Most Goals - Career
  - 87 - Shawn Borris (2005–2009)
- Most Assists - Game
  - 8 - Shane O'Brien (Feb 6/06)
- Most Assists - Season
  - 51 - Shane O'Brien (2006–2007)
- Most Assists - Career
  - 129 - Shane O'Brien (2004–2007)
- Most Games - Career
  - 161 - Jonathan Bray (2001–2004)
- Most Penalty Minutes – Season
  - 229 - Ted Lachance( 2002–2003)
- Most Penalty Minutes - Career
  - 575 - Andrew Michaud (2004–2007)
- Most Points – Season
  - 86 - Shane O'Brien (2006–07)
- Most Points - Career
  - 199 - Shane O'Brien (2004–2007)

==== Goalies ====
- Most Assists by a goalie - Season
  - 2 - Dan Desnoyer (2002–2003)
- Most Games played by a goalie - Season
  - 32 - Joel Morrissey(2006–2007)
- Most Games played by a goalie - Career
  - 66 - Joel Morrissey (2005–2008)

=== Playoffs ===
==== Players ====
- Most Goals - Career
  - 11 - Shawn Borris (2005–2009)
- Most Goals - Season
  - 4 - Grant Mitchell (2008–2009)
  - 4 - Richard Mulligan (2008–2009)
- Most Assists - Career
  - 10 - Adam Lariviere (2005–2009)
  - 10 - Shane O'Brien (2004–2007)
- Most Assists - Season
  - 6 - Adam Lariviere (2008–2009)
  - 6 - Ryan Brady-Gratton (2008–2009)
  - 6 - Steven Knapp (2008–2009)
- Most Career Games
  - 21 - Jonathan Bray (2001–2004)
- Most Career Points
  - 17 - Shawn Borris (2005–2009)

==== Goalies ====
- Most Career Games
  - 12 - Dan Desnoyer

=== Leading scorer in a season by year ===
- 2008 - Shawn Borris(71)
- 2007 - Shawn Borris(40)
- 2006 - Shane O'Brien(86)
- 2005 - Shane O'Brien(50)
- 2004 - Jonathan Bray(30)
- 2003 - Jonathan Bray & Shane O'Brien(36)
- 2002 - Jonathan Bray(34)
- 2001 - Nick Adam(41)
- 2000 - Pat Berlinguette(28)
- 1999 - Brad McMillan(38)
