= Cumberland Bandits =

- City: Cumberland, Ottawa, Canada
- League: National Capital Junior Hockey League
- Founded: 1986
- Folded: 2018
- Home arena: Ray Friel Recreation Complex
- Colours: Red, white, blue,
- Owner: Rick Bedard
- President: Paul Forgues
- General manager: Dale Murdoch (2017–18)
- Head coach: Dale Murdoch (2017–18)

The Cumberland Bandits are a junior ice hockey team based in Cumberland, Ottawa, Ontario, Canada. They are members of the National Capital Junior Hockey League but were inactive for the 2018–19 season. As of 2021, they have not returned to league play.

== History ==
In 2008, the ownership of the Casselman Stars of the Eastern Ontario Junior C Hockey League (EOJCHL) and the town of Casselman were awarded a franchise within the Eastern Ontario Junior B Hockey League. The new team became the Casselman Vikings. As a result, they sold their interests in the EOJCHL Casselman Stars to Claude Pothier from Navan. In 2008, the team became known as the Cumberland Bandits and played their home games out of Ray Friel in Orleans. In 2010, Claude Pothier sold the franchise to the Bedard family. The EOJCHL also rebranded as the National Capital Junior Hockey League (NCJHL) in 2010.

The Bandits have grown to include the junior C team, nine AAA spring hockey clubs, and one amateur men's team.

On June 15, 2018, the NCJHL announced the Bandits would not participate in the 2018–19 season.

== Season-by-season record ==
Note: GP = Games played, W = Wins, L = Losses, T = Ties, OTL = Overtime losses, GF = Goals for, GA = Goals against

Season	GP	W	L	T	OTL	GF	GA	Pts	Finish	Playoffs
2008–09	34	21	10	—	3	216	158	45	2nd EOJCHL	Lost Semifinal
2009–10	34	19	14	—	1	137	130	39	3rd EOJCHL	Lost Quarterfinal
2010–11	34	19	12	—	3	146	120	41	3rd NCJHL	Lost Semifinal
2011–12	32	21	10	—	1	133	104	43	2nd NCJHL	Lost Semifinal
2012–13	34	24	6	—	4	143	101	52	2nd NCJHL	Won League
2013–14	32	14	15	—	3	105	122	31	5th NCJHL	Lost Quarterfinal
2014–15	32	14	12	—	6	132	135	34	6th NCJHL	Won Quarterfinal, 4–3 (Cougars); Lost Semifinal, 0–4 (Panthers)
2015–16	34	17	16	—	1	145	137	35	4th of 5 North; 7th of 10 NCJHL	Lost Div Semifinal, 1–4 (Vikings)
2016–17	32	16	16	—	—	144	129	32	6th of 9 NCJHL	Lost Quarterfinal, 2–4 (Rockets)
2017–18	33	21	11	1	—	150	96	43	4th of 12 NCJHL	Lost Quarterfinal, 3–4 (Eagles)

== Awards ==
Award	Year	Player
Best Defenceman	2015	Matt Hamelin
Best Defenceman	2012	Kentt Coburn
Best Defensive Forward	2014	Remi Leclerc
Playoff MVP	2013	Benoit Harris
Regular Season MVP	2009	Andrew Newell
Most Sportsmanlike Player	2012	Simon Forgues
Most Sportsmanlike Player	2011	Benoit Harris
Coach(es) of the Year	2013	Richard Julien and staff
Coach(es) of the Year	2009	Richard Julien
Executive(s) of the Year	2011	Executive Staff
Executive(s) of the Year	2009	Claude Pothier

== Team honours ==
Honor	Year
League champions	2013
Regular Season Champions	2009 (East Division)
