= Westport Rideaus Jr C =

Westport Rideaus
- City: Westport, Ontario, Canada
- League: National Capital Junior Hockey League
- Founded: 2022
- Home arena: WTC Communications Centre
- Colours: Green,yellow, black
- General manager: Jeff Snow
- Head coach: Steve Merkley

Franchise history
- 2022–present: Westport Rideaus

The Westport Rideaus are a junior ice hockey team based in Westport, Ontario. They play in the National Capital Junior Hockey League from the 2022-23 season, and previously played in the Central Junior B Hockey League.

== Season-by-season record ==
Note: GP = Games Played, W = Wins, L = Losses, T = Ties, OTL = Overtime Losses, GF = Goals for, GA = Goals against

Season	GP	W	L	T	OTL	GF	GA	Pts	Finish	Playoffs
2022–23	36	11	22	1	2	129	194	25	8th of 10, NCJHL	Lost playdowns 1-2 (Inferno)
2023–24	34	18	15	0	1	121	109	37	5th of 10, NCJHL	Lost quarterfinals 1-4 (Castors)
2024–25	34	24	9	0	1	133	95	49	2nd of 10, NCJHL	Won quarterfinals 4-1 (Castors); Lost semifinals 3-4 (Cougars)
2025–26	32	20	9	1	2	141	104	43	3rd of 9, NCJHL	Won quarterfinals 4-0 (Castors); Won semifinals 4-3 (Kanata Kings); Lost League Finals 2-4 (Cougars)
