= Saint-Isidore Eagles =

St-Isidore Eagles
- City: St. Isidore, Ontario, Canada
- League: National Capital Junior Hockey League
- Founded: 1974
- Home arena: St. Isidore Arena
- Colours: Green, white, tan
- General manager: Steven Wells (2019-20)
- Head coach: Carl Bougie (2019-20)

The St-Isidore Eagles are an ice hockey team based out of St. Isidore, Ontario. They play in the National Capital Junior Hockey League. There main colour is green white and black.

== Season-by-season record ==
Note: GP = Games Played, W = Wins, L = Losses, T = Ties, OTL = Overtime Losses, GF = Goals for, GA = Goals against

Season	GP	W	L	T	OTL	GF	GA	Points	Finish	Playoffs
2000-01	30	2	27	1	0	85	198	5	6th EOJCHL	Lost semi-final
2001-02	36	7	25	1	3	133	235	18	7th EOJCHL	Lost quarter-final
2002-03	36	11	23	2	0	123	163	24	5th EOJCHL	Lost quarter-final
2003-04	36	21	13	0	2	141	133	44	4th EOJCHL	Lost semi-final
2004-05	36	23	12	0	1	163	107	47	3rd EOJCHL	Lost semi-final
2005-06	36	21	15	-	0	179	150	42	4th EOJCHL	Lost semi-final
2006-07	34	17	13	-	4	144	119	38	5th EOJCHL	Lost quarter-final
2007-08	35	15	14	-	6	134	134	36	4th EOJCHL	Lost quarter-final
2008-09	34	17	17	-	0	159	162	34	5th EOJCHL	Lost quarter-final
2009-10	34	17	17	-	0	141	147	34	5th EOJCHL	Lost semi-final
2010-11	34	15	17	-	2	150	156	32	5th NCJHL	Lost semi-final
2011-12	32	20	9	-	3	147	109	43	3rd NCJHL	Lost final
2012-13	34	29	4	-	1	194	110	59	1st NCJHL	Lost final
2013-14	32	16	11	-	5	157	154	37	3rd NCJHL	Lost semi-final
2014-15	32	17	13	-	2	138	119	36	3rd NCJHL	Won quarter finals 4-1 (Jr. Olympiques); Lost semi-final 1-4 (Vikings)
2015-16	34	19	14	-	1	160	118	39	2nd of 5 South; 3rd of 10 NCJHL	Won semifinals (4-2)(Cougars); Lost Div. Finals (2-4) Panthers)
2016-17	32	9	21	2	-	108	161	20	9th NCJHL	Lost Play in Game (0-0)(Lions)
2017-18	33	20	12	1	-	167	139	41	5th of 12; NCJHL	Won quarterfinals, 4-3(Bandits); Lost semifinals (2-4) (Rockets)
2018-19	36	23	13	-	-	178	134	46	3rd of 5 East; 4th of 10 NCJHL	Lost quarterfinals (1-4)(Rockets)
2019-20	34	18	14	2	-	158	133	38	2nd of 5 East; 3rd of 10 NCJHL	Lost quarterfinals (3-4)(Royals)
2020-21	Covid									
2021-22	22	10	10	2	-	74	71	22	6th of 9 NCJHL	Lost quarterfinals (0-3)(Rockets)
2022-23	36	20	13	1	2	153	146	43	6th of 10 NCJHL	Lost quarterfinals (1-3)(Rockets)
2023-24	34	17	14	1	2	122	131	37	6th of 10 NCJHL	Lost quarterfinals (1-3)(Cougars)
2024-25	34	15	13	3	3	123	126	36	5th of 10 NCJHL	Lost quarterfinals (3-4)(Rockets)
2025-26	32	17	13	0	2	117	107	36	4th of 9 NCJHL	Lost quarterfinals (0-4)(Rangers)

== Individual player awards ==
Season	Name	Award
2012-13	Félix Lalonde	Top Scorer
	Mathieu Desforges	Best Defenseman
2011-12	Mathieu Desforges	Best Defenseman
	J-F Ducharme & Mathieu Sauvé	Coach of the Year
2010-11	Ghislain Nadeau	Regular Season MVP
2009-10	Mathieu Chenier	Best Defensive Forward
	Marc-André Wathier	Most Sportsmanlike Player
	Christian Levac	Executive of the Year
2008-09	Warren Hovius	Best Defenseman
	Marc-André Wathier	Most Sportsmanlike Player
2006-07	Joshua Fletcher	Most Improved Player
	Denis Quesnel	Best Defensive Forward
2005-06	Joshua Fletcher	Best Defenseman
2004-05	J-F Ducharme	Top Scorer
	Christian Levac	Best Goaltender
2003-04	Shawn Turcotte	Most Sportsmanlike Player
	Pierre Theoret	Best Defensive Forward
	J-F Ducharme	Most Improved Player
2002-03	Shawn Turcotte	Most Sportsmanlike Player
	Christian Levac	Best Goaltender
2001-02	Shawn Turcotte	Most Sportsmanlike Player
2000-01	Shawn Pyke	Regular Season MVP
1995-96	André Theoret	Best Defenseman
1994-95	Marie-France Morin	Rookie of the Year
1992-93	Eric Leroux	Best Defenseman
1990-91	Phil Sanchez	Coach of the Year
1988-89	Paul Maisonneuve	Rookie of the Year
	Marc Lalonde	Most Improved Player
1987-88	Alain Lapensée	Regular Season MVP
1986-87	Jean Maisonneuve	Most Sportsmanlike Player
1985-86	Alain Lapensée	Regular Season MVP
