= Gatineau Hull-Volants =

Gatineau Hull-Volant
- City: Gatineau, Quebec, Canada
- League: Laurentides-Lanaudière Junior AA Hockey League
- Founded: 2006
- Home arena: Centre Slush Puppie
- Colours: Black, white, silver
- General manager: Richard Gravel
- Head coach: Stéphane Bélanger

Franchise history
- 2006-2009: La Pêche Express
- 2009-2012: Gatineau Express
- 2013-2015: Gatineau Jr. Olympiques
- 2015-present: Gatineau Hull-Volant

Gatineau Hull-Volant is a Canadian Junior ice hockey team based in Gatineau, Quebec. They play in the Laurentides-Lanaudière Junior AA Hockey League.

== History ==
The Express have joined the league for the 2006-07 season. The team, originally from Sainte-Cécile-de-Masham, Quebec, took the name La Pêche Express from the sports complex they played out of near Lac La Pêche on the Ontario-Quebec border.

In Summer 2009, the Express moved to Aylmer, Quebec.

For the 2012-2013 season, the team took a break and did not participate that season. The Express' players were given an opportunity to try out and play with other teams in the National Capital Junior Hockey League with a condition that they would return the following season.

In March 2013, the Gatineau Express announced their return to the NCJHL. The team will now be playing their home games at the Robert Guertin Centre in Gatineau, QC. They soon after changed their name to the Jr. Olympiques and during the summer of 2015 re-branded to the Gatineau Hull-Volants.

== Season-by-season record ==
Note: GP = Games Played, W = Wins, L = Losses, T = Ties, OTL = Overtime Losses, GF = Goals for, GA = Goals against

| Season | GP | W | L | T | OTL | GF | GA | Points | Finish | Playoffs |
| 2006-07 | 34 | 19 | 12 | - | 3 | 133 | 141 | 41 | 2nd EOJCHL | Lost semi-final |
| 2007-08 | 36 | 14 | 18 | - | 4 | 149 | 166 | 32 | 5th EOJCHL | Lost semi-final |
| 2008-09 | 34 | 7 | 25 | - | 2 | 140 | 221 | 16 | 8th EOJCHL | Lost quarter-final |
| 2009-10 | 34 | 11 | 23 | - | 0 | 116 | 182 | 22 | 8th EOJCHL | Lost quarter-final |
| 2010-11 | 34 | 8 | 26 | - | 0 | 113 | 220 | 16 | 8th NCJHL | Lost quarter-final |
| 2011-12 | 32 | 14 | 17 | - | 1 | 113 | 136 | 29 | 6th NCJHL | Lost quarter-final |
| 2012-13 | Did not participate | | | | | | | | | |
| 2013-14 | 32 | 12 | 20 | - | 0 | 143 | 166 | 24 | 8th NCJHL | Lost qualifier |
| 2014-15 | 32 | 20 | 12 | - | 0 | 135 | 124 | 40 | 4th NCJHL | Lost quarters, 1-4 - Aigles |
Gatineau Hull-Volants
| 2015-16 | 34 | 17 | 14 | - | 3 | 172 | 155 | 37 | 3rd of 5 North; 6th of 10 NCJHL | Won Div Semifinal, 4-2 (Nationals); Lost Div Final 0-4 (Vikings) |
| 2016-17 | 32 | 12 | 18 | 2 | - | 129 | 119 | 26 | 7th of 9 NCJHL | Won quarterfinal, 4-3 (Vikings); Lost semifinals, 0-4 (Panthers) |
| 2017-18 | 33 | 22 | 11 | 0 | - | 146 | 110 | 44 | 2nd of 12 NCJHL | Lost quarterfinal, 2-4 (Castors) |
| 2018-19 | 36 | 13 | 21 | 2 | - | 138 | 147 | 28 | 5th of 5 East; 8th of 10 NCJHL | Lost quarterfinal, 0-4 (Castors) |
| 2022-23 | 36 | 22 | 13 | 1 | - | 182 | 125 | 45 | 4th of 10 NCJHL | Won quarterfinal, 3-2 (Cougars); Won semifinals, 4-3 (Rangers); Won finals, 4-0 (Castors); NCJHL CHAMPIONS |
| 2023-24 | 34 | 30 | 2 | 1 | 1 | 215 | 81 | 62 | 1st of 10 NCJHL | Won quarterfinal, 4-0 (Rangers); Won semifinals, 4-3 (Castors); Won finals, 4-1 (Cougars); NCJHL CHAMPIONS |
| 2024-25 | 34 | 30 | 3 | 1 | 0 | 193 | 71 | 61 | 1st of 10 NCJHL | Won quarterfinal, 4-1 (Castors); Won semifinals, 4-0 (Rockets); Won finals, 4-0 (Cougars); NCJHL CHAMPIONS |

== Individual player awards ==
| Season | Name | Award |
| 2008-09 | Léandre Gagné Lemieux | Rookie of the Year |

The only Express player so far to receive an individual award has been Léandre Gagné Lemieux. After a quick step in the Quebec Junior AAA league at the beginning of the season, he bounced to La Pêche who was in a year of transition. The team was not very competitive but young Gagné Lemieux managed to keep an average of more than 2 points per game. He finished that year third in the league's leading scorers.

In 2022/2023, Etienne Champagne broke the NCJHL single season points record on his way to regular season MVP honours.
