= Essex Memorial Arena =

Ice-hockey arena in Essex, Ontario

Coordinates: 42.1683°N 82.8153°W

The Essex Memorial Arena was an ice-hockey arena in Essex, Ontario, Canada constructed in 1960–1961. The capacity of the Essex Memorial Arena was 1,501 and it served as the home ice for the Essex 73's of the Great Lakes Junior C Hockey League from 1973 to 2009. During that time the 73's won 16 Great Lakes League Championships and 6 Ontario Junior C titles, The 2008–2009 season was to be the final year for the 73's at the Essex Memorial Arena and in that year the 73's captured the Ontario Junior C crown finishing with a perfect 31–0 record in the arena. A replacement arena was completed in September 2009. Various groups including Essex Minor Hockey continued to use the arena until it was demolished in the summer of 2015.

== History ==
The first records mentioning the potential of an artificial rink for Essex are from the mid-1950s. The idea grew and by March 1956 the Parks Board created an Arena Committee, which it named the Essex Memorial Arena Campaign Committee, and appointed members from the Essex Rotary Club, the Legion (Branch 201), and the Kinsmen Club of Essex. The Kinsmen Club of Essex were the first to initiate a challenge to the town to raise $50,000. The name of the arena was one of the first issues addressed. It was decided that it would be called Essex Memorial Arena in honour of the men who had fought and died in World War I and World War II.

== Indoor Design ==
The first arena proposed by the committee was an outdoor arena. An outdoor arena could only function from December 1 to April 15. The design allowed for the easy addition of a roof at a later time. The committee soon changed the original proposal from an outdoor arena to a closed arena due to the long-term economic benefit. It was $15,000 more expensive for the freezing equipment for an outdoor rink than for an indoor rink, and the utility costs for the outdoor rink would have been much higher. Another bonus to having an indoor rink was the longer skating season; 6 months compared to 4½. With 10,000 people in the area surrounding Essex the indoor option would increase revenue to easily pay for up front extra cost for an indoor arena.

== Completing the construction ==
The Essex community was not completely supportive of the arena building project. They feared the arena would increase water rates in town, and that the arena was an unsafe structure. By the final stages of construction funds were drying up and $100,000 would be needed to complete it. On June 19, 1961, the town went to the polls to settle the issue, voting 551 to 392 in favour of the arena loan. The loan was obtained and the building was completed within the year. The walls were made of 12 in (30 cm) thick reinforced masonry blocks. The roof is supported by eleven trusses. The arena has heated dressing rooms, a canteen and 1054 seats. It took 937 days to fully complete the arena. The Essex Memorial Arena Campaign Committee was then dissolved and the town took control and created an Arena Commission.

The arena officially opened on November 25, 1961.

== Decommission and Demolition ==
In the early 2000s the deterioration of the southeast corner of the arena forced an emergency closure for repair work. This, along with the shortage of ice time in Essex Centre prompted Essex to build a new arena which was completed for the 2009-10 hockey season. Despite the completion of the new Essex Centre Sports Complex next to the Essex Memorial Arena the older structure continued to be used for hockey for a time. In August 2011 Essex and Lakeshore, Ontario agreed to keep the arena open until 2014 when Lakeshore's own new arena would be completed. With some roof repairs the arena remained open until the end of the 2014-15 hockey season. The arena was demolished in the summer of 2015.
