= Tony Piroski =

Canadian ice hockey player

Tony Piroski (born June 12, 1954) is a Canadian retired professional ice hockey goaltender.

== Career ==
Piroski was born in Windsor, Ontario. He played the most seasons for the Toledo Goaldiggers of the International Hockey League. He later coached Toledo for the 1984–85, recording a 32–42–5–3 record. In 2001, Piroski joined began coaching the Essex 73's. In his nine seasons with the club, they won seven league championships, and three Provincial titles, recording a record of 286–47. On Tuesday, March 16, 2010, Piroski was named head coach of the Leamington Flyers Jr. B Hockey Club. In his First season with the Flyers, they won 26 games (26–21–0–4) compared to seven wins (7–38–0–5) the season before, a 19-win improvement under Piroski in his first season.

In Piroski's fourth season with the Leamington Flyers he guided the team to a first place finish with a record of 37–10–2 and would lead the 2013–14 Leamington Flyers to their first-ever Western Conference Championship.

In 2018, Flyers owner Abe Fehr sold the team to five local businessmen and Piroski decided to step down as Head Coach of the Leamington Flyers. In Piroski's eight seasons as Head Coach of the Flyers, he had a regular season record of 262 wins, 108 losses, 6 ties and 25 overtime losses. Leamington won two Western Conference Championships along with four straight League Finals appearances.

Midway through the 2023-2024 season Piroski returned as head coach of the Essex 73's. The team would finish 15-2-0-0 under Piroski to finish 2nd in the Stobbs Division. The 73's would lose in 7 games to the Lakeshore Canadiens in the Division Finals.

== Coaching career ==
Team	Year	Regular season							Postseason
Team	Year	G	W	L	T	OTL	Pts	Finish	Result
Essex 73's	2001–02	40	30	8	2	0	62	1st in GLJHL	League Champions & Ontario Junior C Champions
Essex 73's	2002–03	40	33	4	3	0	69	1st in GLJHL	League champions & Ontario Junior C Semi-Finalist
Essex 73's	2003–04	40	33	3	4	0	70	1st in GLJHL	League Finalist
Essex 73's	2004–05	40	32	5	1	2	67	1st in GLJHL	League Champions & Ontario Junior C Champions
Essex 73's	2005–06	40	25	11	3	1	54	4th in GLJHL	League champions & Ontario Junior C Finalist
Essex 73's	2006–07	40	32	4	2	2	68	1st in GLJHL	League champions & Ontario Junior C Finalist
Essex 73's	2007–08	40	33	3	3	1	70	1st in GLJHL	League champions & Ontario Junior C Finalist
Essex 73's	2008–09	40	39	0	0	1	79	1st in GLJHL	League Champions & Ontario Junior C Champions
Essex 73's	2009–10	40	29	9	-	2	61	2nd in GLJHL	League Finalist
Leamington Flyers	2010–11	51	26	21	-	4	55	5th in GOJHL	Lost in quarter-finals
Leamington Flyers	2011–12	51	30	17	-	4	64	2nd in GOJHL	Lost in quarter-finals
Leamington Flyers	2012–13	51	32	16	-	3	67	2nd in GOJHL	Lost in semi-finals
Leamington Flyers	2013–14	49	37	10	-	2	76	1st in GOJHL	League Champions & Sutherland Cup Semi-finalist
Leamington Flyers	2014–15	49	38	9	-	2	78	1st in GOJHL	League Champions & Sutherland Cup Semi-finalist
Leamington Flyers	2015–16	50	41	8	1	0	83	1st in GOJHL	League Finalist
Leamington Flyers	2016–17	50	27	16	0	7	61	4th in GOJHL	League Finalist
Leamington Flyers	2017–18	50	31	11	5	3	70	2nd in GOJHL	Lost in semi-final
Essex 73's	2023-2024	17	15	2	0	0	0	2nd in Stobbs	Lost League Finals
Essex 73's	2024-2025	42	37	4	1	0	0	1st in Stobbs	League champions & Ontario Junior C Finalist
Essex 73's	2025-2026	42	37	4	1	0	0	1st in Stobbs	Lost League Finals
