= Outaouais Jr. Académie =

- City: La Pêche, Quebec, Canada
- League: National Capital Junior Hockey League
- Founded: 1996
- Folded: 2016
- Home arena: Complex Sportif de La Pêche
- Colours: Black, white, purple
- General manager: Mike Budge
- Head coach: Richard Savard

Franchise history
- 1996-2000: Long Sault Vipers
- 2000-2003: Vanier Thunder
- 2004-2010: East Ottawa Thunder
- 2010-2015: La Pêche Predators
- 2015-2016: Outaouais Jr. Académie

The Outaouais Jr. Académie were a Junior ice hockey team based in La Pêche, Quebec. They play in the National Capital Junior Hockey League.

== History ==
The 2006-07 and 2007–08, back-to-back seasons saw the Predators win the regular season and playoff season league championships. The only two so far for the franchise.

Prior to the 2015-16 season the Predators re-branded themselves to the Outaouais Jr. Académie. After the 2015–16 season, the team was disbanded.

== Season-by-season record ==
Note: GP = Games Played, W = Wins, L = Losses, T = Ties, OTL = Overtime Losses, GF = Goals for, GA = Goals against

Season	GP	W	L	T	OTL	GF	GA	Points	Finish	Playoffs
2000-01	Did Not Participate									
2001-02	36	11	23	1	1	142	223	24	6th EOJCHL	Lost quarter-final
2002-03	36	10	24	1	1	133	219	22	6th EOJCHL	Lost quarter-final
2003-04	36	23	12	0	1	173	153	47	3rd EOJCHL	Lost semi-final
2004-05	36	17	15	3	1	145	131	38	5th EOJCHL	Lost quarter-final
2005-06	36	25	8	-	3	183	131	53	2nd EOJCHL	Lost semi-final
2006-07	34	28	5	-	1	186	93	57	1st EOJCHL	Won League
2007-08	36	32	4	-	0	212	101	64	1st EOJCHL	Won League
2008-09	34	21	9	-	4	181	138	46	2nd EOJCHL	Lost final
2009-10	34	21	11	-	2	175	158	44	2nd EOJCHL	Lost semi-final
2010-11	34	16	17	-	1	140	168	33	4th NCJHL	Lost quarter-final
2011-12	32	19	12	-	1	161	127	39	4th NCJHL	Lost quarter-final
2012-13	34	15	19	-	0	157	187	31	6th NCJHL	Lost quarter-final
2013-14	32	10	20	-	2	159	210	22	9th NCJHL	Lost quarter-final
2014-15	32	8	22	-	2	128	203	18	8th NCJHL	Lost quarter-final - 0-4 - (Panthers)
2015-16	34	6	27	-	1	85	178	13	5th of 5 North; 9th of 10 NCJHL	Did not qualify

== Individual Player Awards ==
Season	Name	Award
2012-13	Guillaume Grégoire	Regular Season MVP
2011-12	Mikaël Gervais	Rookie of the Year
	Mikaël Gervais	Top Scorer
	Mikaël Gervais	Regular Season MVP
	Mikaël Sabourin	Most Improved Player
2009-10	Karim Filiou	Regular Season MVP
	Matt Arthur	Best Goaltender
	Jared Havelock	Rookie of the Year
2008-09	Phil Adam	Top Scorer
	Chris Hunter	Regular Season MVP
2007-08	Chris Hunter	Top Scorer
	Phil Adam	Regular Season MVP
	Phil Beauchamp	Playoff MVP
	Jason Lacelle	Best Goaltender
2006-07	Marc Dumas	Playoff MVP
	Dale Hilbrant	Rookie of the Year
2005-06	Kevin Reynolds	Best Goaltender
	Kevin reynolds	Rookie of the Year
	Richard Lafrerriere & Stephane Malette	Coach of the Year
2004-05	Jonathan White	Best Defenseman
	Daniel Haire	Rookie of the Year
	Greg McConnell	Coach of the Year
	Pierre J. Loyer	Executive of the Year
