= North Dundas Rockets =

- City: Chesterville, Ontario, Canada
- League: National Capital Junior Hockey League
- Founded: 2011
- Home arena: Chesterville & District Arena
- Colours: Black, white, red
- General manager: Robyn Sadler
- Head coach: Lenard Mclean

The North Dundas Rockets are a junior ice hockey team based out of Chesterville, Ontario. They play in the National Capital Junior Hockey League.

== History ==
The 2017–18 season was the best season up to that point for the Rockets as they took to second place in the league. The team had league MVP and best defenceman in Bryden van Kessel; the rookie of the year with Justin Lefebvre, Executive of the Year in Robyn Sadler and the Coach(es) of the year with Nik Pass and Lenard McLean.

== Season-by-season record ==
Note: GP = Games Played, W = Wins, L = Losses, T = Ties, OTL = Overtime Losses, GF = Goals for, GA = Goals against

Season	GP	W	L	T	OTL	GF	GA	Points	Finish	Playoffs
2011–12	32	10	20	—	2	98	155	22	8th NCJHL	Lost quarter-finals, 0–4 (Panthers)
2012–13	34	8	25	—	1	110	173	17	7th NCJHL	Lost quarter-finals, 1–4 (Bandits)
2013–14	32	13	17	—	2	108	120	28	7th NCJHL	Lost quarter-finals, 2–4 (Panthers)
2014–15	32	9	17	—	6	107	155	24	7th NCJHL	Lost quarter-finals, 1–4 (Vikings)
2015–16	34	12	20	—	2	122	177	26	4th of 5, South; 8th of 10, NCJHL	Lost div. semi-finals, 1–4 (Panthers)
2016–17	32	18	14	0	—	160	174	36	3rd of 9, NCJHL	Won quarterfinals, 4–2 (Bandits); Won semifinals, 4–0 (Cougars); Lost League Finals, 1–4 (Panthers)
2017–18	33	22	10	1	—	186	122	45	2nd of 12, NCJHL	Won quarterfinals, 4–1 (Cougars); Won semifinals, 4–2 (Eagles); Lost League Finals, 3-4 (Vikings)
2018–19	36	22	13	1	-	175	139	45	2nd of 5, West; 5th of 10, NCJHL	Won quarterfinals, 4-1 (Eagles); Lost semifinals, 1-4 (Castors)
2019–20	34	17	15	2	-	171	137	36	2nd of 5, West; 5th of 10, NCJHL	Won quarterfinals, 4-3 (Castors); Covid cancel Semifinals, 2-0 (Royals)
2021–22	23	15	7	1	—	127	90	31	3rd of 9, NCJHL	Won quarterfinals, 3-0 (Eagles); Lost semifinals, 2-4 (Rangers)
2022–23	36	24	10	2	—	166	119	50	3rd of 10, NCJHL	Won quarterfinals, 3-1 (Eagles); Lost semifinals, 2-4 (Castors)
2023–24	34	15	18	1	—	118	145	31	7th of 10, NCJHL	Lost quarterfinals, 1-4 (Lions)
2024–25	33	21	11	1	—	128	107	43	4th of 10, NCJHL	Won quarterfinals, 4-3 (Eagles); Lost Semifinal 0-4 (Hull-Volants)
2025–26	32	4	26	0	2	77	200	10	9th of 9, NCJHL	Lost Playin Game 2-6 (Lions)
