= Cumberland Castors =

- City: Orleans, Ontario, Canada
- League: National Capital Junior Hockey League
- Founded: 1987
- Home arena: Ray Friel Recreation Complex
- Colours: Blue, white, orange
- General manager: Tim Kosch
- Head coach: Tim Kosch

Franchise history
- 1987-2017: Rockland Nationals
- 2017-2023: Clarence Castors
- 2023-current: Cumberland Castors

The Cumberland Castors are a Canadian Junior ice hockey team playing out of Cumberland, Ontario, Canada. They are part of the National Capital Junior Hockey League.

The Castors operated from 1987-2017 as the Rockland Nationals in Rockland, Ontario.

== History ==
The original Nationals were founded in 1973 to replace the Hull Festivals who had just left the Central Junior A Hockey League for the Quebec Major Junior Hockey League. In just three season the Nationals, coached by Bryan Murray, won the league, the Dudley Hewitt Cup as Central Canadian champions, and the Centennial Cup 1976 National Championship. Unfortunately for them, in those days the teams played sets of best-of-seven series to determine the national champion. Many successful Tier II clubs like the Red Deer Rustlers, the Guelph Platers, and the Vernon Vipers franchises were well rooted in their communities when they were victorious, with warchests of cash from major sponsors and massive fan support awaiting long playoff runs. The Nationals were in their infantile stage as an organization and found themselves not only national champions but financially bankrupt from months of travel across the county. They survived one more season on life support funds from the CJHL before packing it in for the 1977-78 season. The fall of the Nationals convinced the CJHL to petition the Canadian Amateur Hockey Association to consider alternate, cheaper, playdown methods to determine regional and national champions. The CAHA answered back a few seasons later with the formation of round-robin championship tournaments. Until the Pembroke Lumber Kings won the 2011 Royal Bank Cup, the Nationals were the only team in Central League history to win a national championship.

A decade later the Nationals were reborn. In 1987, the Nationals entered the Eastern Ontario Junior C Hockey League and won the league title in their first season back in action. In recent years, the Nationals have been pushing to re-enter the CJHL, but with no results so far.

=== Centennial Cup 1976 and on ===
In only their third season, the Nationals were league champions. They moved on to take on the Southern Ontario Junior A Hockey League and Ontario Hockey Association champion Guelph Platers. The series went the distance, but the Nationals pulled out a 4-games-to-3 series win.

The Nationals then took on the Lac-Megantic Royals, the champions of the Quebec Provincial Junior A Hockey League. The Nationals defeated them 4-games-to-1 to get to the Eastern Canadian Championship.

In the Eastern Canadian championship, the Nationals drew the Island Junior Hockey League's Charlottetown Colonels. The Nationals overpowered the Islanders and crushed them 4-games-to-none. In the final, the Nationals came to play the Alberta Junior Hockey League, Doyle Cup, and Abbott Cup Champion Spruce Grove Mets. The Mets were floored by the Nationals in the first two games, losing 9-4 and 7-1 respectively. In Game 3, the Mets pulled close in a 5-3 loss and then took game four 4-3. Game 5 saw the National regain their early series form and crush the Mets 7-3 to win their first and only National title 4-games-to-1.

Their landmark victory, led by coach Bryan Murray, was the first time a team from the Central Junior A Hockey League had won the Junior A National Championship. The cost of the venture left the team in financial turmoil and led to them folding a year later.

The Rockland Nationals returned in 1987, ten years after folding. Before the start of 2017-2018 season, the Rockland Nationals were renamed to Les Castors de Clarence (or Clarence Castors) and have moved to the Clarence Creek Arena in Clarence-Rockland, Ontario. After the 2022-23 season the team relocated to Orleans/Cumberland and became the Cumberland Castors.

== Season-by-season record ==
Note: GP = Games Played, W = Wins, L = Losses, T = Ties, OTL = Overtime Losses, GF = Goals for, GA = Goals against

Season	GP	W	L	T	OTL	GF	GA	Points	Finish	Playoffs
1973-74	50	13	33	4	-	260	349	30	6th CJHL	
1974-75	50	25	18	7	-	251	249	57	3rd CJHL	
1975-76	50	31	11	8	-	324	225	70	1st CJHL	Won League, won DHC, won MCC
1976-77	50	22	22	6	-	243	230	50	4th CJHL	
1977-87	Did Not Participate									
1987-04	Eastern Jr. C Standings Not Available									
2004-05	36	20	13	0	3	172	133	43	4th EOJCHL	Lost semi-final
2005-06	36	14	20	-	2	143	183	30	5th EOJCHL	Lost quarter-final
2006-07	34	8	25	-	1	96	200	17	8th EOJCHL	Lost quarter-final
2007-08	35	18	15	-	2	146	143	38	3rd EOJCHL	Lost semi-final
2008-09	33	10	22	-	1	154	208	21	7th EOJCHL	Lost quarter-final
2009-10	34	17	13	-	4	159	148	38	4th EOJCHL	Lost final
2010-11	34	22	9	-	3	182	164	47	2nd NCJHL	Lost final
2011-12	32	16	15	-	1	132	132	33	5th NCJHL	Lost semi-final
2012-13	34	14	17	-	3	135	157	31	5th NCJHL	Lost semi-final
2013-14	32	13	16	-	3	116	147	29	6th NCJHL	Lost quarter-final
2014-15	32	5	26	-	1	90	198	11	9th NCJHL	did not qualify
2015-16	34	18	14	-	2	144	132	38	2nd of 5 North; 5th of 10 NCJHL	Lost div semi-finals (2-4)(Volants)
2016-17	32	16	15	-	1	159	166	31	5th of 9 NCJHL	Lost quarterfinals (1-4)(Cougars)
Clarence Castors
2017-18	33	20	12	-	1	165	129	41	6th of 12 NCJHL	Won quarterfinals (4-2)(Volants); Lost semifinals (2-4) Vikings
2018-19	36	29	6	-	1	193	95	59	1st of 5 East; 1st of 10 NCJHL	Won quarterfinals (4-0)(Volants); Won semifinals (4-1) Rockets; Lost finals (0-4) Cougars
2020-21	Season lost to covid-19									
2021-22	23	19	3	1	-	96	50	39	1st of 9 NCJHL	Won quarterfinals (3-0)(Jets); Won semifinals (4-3) (Hull-Volants); Won finals, (4-0) (Rangers); NCJHL CHAMPIONS
2022-23	35	24	8	2	1	174	110	51	2nd of 10 NCJHL	Won quarterfinals (3-2)(Lions); Won Semifinals (4-2) (Rockets); Lost finals, 0-4 (Hull-Volants)
Cumberland Castors
2023-24	34	18	13	2	1	134	112	39	4th of 10 NCJHL	Won quarterfinals (4-1)(Rideaus); Lost Semifinals (3-4) (Hull-Volants)
2024-25	34	11	20	2	1	115	124	25	8th of 10 NCJHL	Lost quarterfinals (1-4)(Hull Volants)
2025-26	34	14	15	0	3	123	123	31	6th of 9 NCJHL	Lost quarterfinals (0-4)(Westport Rideaus)

Preceded by Spruce Grove Mets	Centennial Cup Champions; 1976	Succeeded by Prince Albert Raiders
