= Metcalfe Jets =

- City: Metcalfe, Ontario, Canada
- League: National Capital Junior Hockey League
- Division: Martin
- Founded: 1967
- Home arena: Larry Robinson Arena
- Colours: Dark green, pale green
- Owner: Kevin Collins
- General manager: Julia Tuff
- Head coach: Kevin Collins

Franchise history
- 1967-1969: Russell Jets
- 1969-Present: Metcalfe Jets

The Metcalfe Jets are a Junior "C" ice hockey team based out of Metcalfe, Ontario. They initially played in Junior "B" out of the Eastern Ontario Junior Hockey League which was re-branded to the Central Canada Hockey League 2. For the 2017-18 season the franchise became members of the National Capital Junior Hockey League.

== History ==
Following the 2014-15 season the Eastern Ontario Junior Hockey League and the Central Canada Hockey League became associated. There were changes to the Junior B league including the re-branding, reduction of teams, and association with a revised midget league. The new EOJHL became the Central Canada Hockey League Tier 2 and the Jets were part of the Martin Division.

Starting the 2017-18 season the Jets moved to the National Capital Junior Hockey League changing from junior "B" to junior "C" level hockey.

== Season-by-season results ==
Season	GP	W	L	T	OTL	GF	GA	P	Results	Playoffs
1999-00	41	16	24	1	1	163	183	35	5th EO Metro	Lost Preliminary
2000-01	42	27	16	2	2	155	129	58	2nd EO Metro	Lost Division S-final
2001-02	40	16	21	3	2	172	186	37	4th EO Metro	Lost Division S-final
2002-03	40	19	19	2	1	167	166	41	5th EO Metro	Lost Division S-final
2003-04	40	29	9	2	0	210	135	60	1st EO Metro	Won League
2004-05	40	23	15	0	1	196	160	49	3rd EO Metro	Lost Division S-final
2005-06	40	20	16	2	2	185	184	44	3rd EO Metro	Lost Division S-final
2006-07	40	10	28	1	1	140	232	22	5th EO Metro	Lost Preliminary
2007-08	40	3	32	4	1	124	251	11	5th EO Metro	Lost Preliminary
2008-09	40	7	32	1	0	132	250	15	5th EO Metro	
2009-10	44	13	22	4	5	154	213	35	5th EO Metro	DNQ
2010-11	42	15	23	3	1	124	167	34	4th EO Metro	Lost Division S-Final
2011-12	42	17	19	5	1	158	169	40	4th EO Metro	
2012-13	42	20	20	0	2	146	160	42	5th EO Metro	DNQ
2013-14	41	15	26	0	0	119	159	30	5th EO Metro	DNQ
2014-15	40	18	18	1	3	154	155	40	4th EO Metro	Lost Div. Semi-finals, 0-4 (Golden Knights)
2015-16	44	26	15	1	2	184	168	55	3rd of 8 Martin Div; 5th of 16 CCHL2	Lost Quarterfinals, 2-4 (Golden Knights)
2016-17	48	31	16	0	1	218	168	63	3rd of 8 Martin Div; 6th of 16 CCHL2	Lost Quarterfinals, 3-4 (Vikings)
Season	GP	W	L	T	GF	GA	P	Results	Playoffs	
2017-18	33	18	14	1	157	127	37	7th of 12 NCJHL	Lost Play In, 0-2 (Rangers)	
2018-19	36	14	21	1	135	140	29	3rd of 5 West; 7th of 10 NCJHL	Lost Quarterfinals, 0-4 (Rangers)	
2021-22	22	2	18	2	43	123	6	9th of 9 NCJHL	Won Wild Card, 2-1 (Inferno); Lost Quarterfinals, 0-4 (Castors)	
2022-23	36	2	32	2	89	239	6	10th of 10 NCJHL	Did not qualify for post season play	
2023-24	34	7	24	2	103	173	16	10th of 10 NCJHL	Did not qualify for post season play	
2024-25	33	13	17	3	110	145	29	6th of 10 NCJHL	Lost Quarter 0-4 (Cougars)	
2025-26	32	13	16	3	119	125	29	7th of 9 NCJHL	Lost Quarter 0-4 (Kings)	

== Notable alumni ==
- Marc Savard
- Larry Robinson
- Shayne James
