= Kanata Kings =

Ice hockey team in Ontario, Canada

- City: Kanata, Ontario
- League: National Capital Junior Hockey League
- Founded: 2017
- Home arena: Jack Charron Arena
- Colours: Dark Blue, Gold, Grey
- General manager: Sean O’Leary
- Head coach: Nick Cuddy
- Captain: Ben Caron
- Website: Kings Website

Franchise history
- 2017-2018: Blackburn Inferno
- 2018–2021: West Carleton Inferno
- 2021-2025: Almonte Inferno
- 2025-present: Kanata Kings

The Kanata Kings are a junior ice hockey team based in Kanata, Ontario. They play in the National Capital Junior Hockey League.

== History ==
On March 30, 2017, a franchise was awarded to Blackburn, Ontario to start play in the 2017–2018 season along with three other new franchises.

On April 16, 2018, the Blackburn Inferno would be sold and moved to Carp, Ontario and named the West Carleton Inferno. They would announce their home arena to be the W. Erskine Johnston Arena in Carp, Ontario.

On August 27, 2021, the West Carleton Inferno announced on social media that they were relocating to Almonte, Ontario. On August 30, they unveiled their new name, the Almonte Inferno.

On July 25, 2025, it was announced on the NCJHL website that the team has been sold and relocated to Kanata, Ontario. The team’s new name would be the Kanata Kings. The arenas will be Bell Sensplex, Cavanagh Sensplex, Walter Baker Sports Centre, Fred Barrett Arena, and Ray Friel Community Complex, WTC Communications Centre, and Larry Robinson Arena.

== Season-by-season record ==
Note: GP = Games Played, W = Wins, L = Losses, T = Ties, OTL = Overtime Losses, GF = Goals for, GA = Goals against

Season	GP	W	L	T	OTL	GF	GA	Pts	Finish	Playoffs
2017-18	33	5	27	1	0	68	196	11	11th of 12, NCJHL	did not qualify
2018-19	36	2	28	3	3	55	185	7	5th of 5 West; 10th of 10, NCJHL	did not qualify
2019-20	34	11	21	1	1	104	161	23	4th of 5 West; 9th of 10, NCJHL	did not qualify
Almonte Inferno
2021-22	23	4	18	1	0	53	111	23	8th of 9, NCJHL	L, wild card, 1-2; Metcalfe Jets
2022-23	36	10	22	2	2	116	168	24	9th of 10, NCJHL	W, Play In, 2-1 Westport; L, Quarters, 1-3 South Grenville
2023-24	34	7	24	0	3	100	184	17	9th of 10 NCJHL	Did Not Qualify for Post Season
2024-25	34	9	25	0	0	92	173	18	9th of 10 NCJHL	Did Not Qualify for Post Season
Kanata Kings
2025-26	32	21	8	2	1	129	91	45	2nd of 9 NCJHL	Quarters, won 4-0 vs Metcalfe; Semifinals, lost 3-4 Westport
