= National Capital Junior Hockey League =

Canadian junior hockey league

- Membership: Hockey Eastern Ontario
- President: Ian McRae
- Directors: Richard Charest & Hubert Seguin
- Founded: 1969
- Recent champions: Vankleek Hill Cougars (2026)
- Website: NCJHL Website

The National Capital Junior Hockey League (NCJHL) is a Canadian Junior ice hockey league in Ontario, sanctioned by the Hockey Eastern Ontario and Hockey Canada. The league is meant to be an interprovincial league between Ontario and Quebec.

== History ==
From 1968 until 2010, the league was known as the Eastern Ontario Junior C Hockey League. At the start of the 2010-2011 regular season, the league was rebranded under its new name - National Capital Junior Hockey League (NCJHL).

In April 2015, the NCJHL accepted the application of the Morrisburg Lions to join the league for starting in the 2015-2016 season. The Lions were one of six teams dropped when the Eastern Ontario Junior Hockey League re-configured and re-branded as the Central Canada Hockey League Tier 2.

In March 2017, it was announced that the reigning NCJHL champions, Embrun Panthers, were joining CCHL Tier 2 in the fall of 2017.

In April 2017, four new teams have been accepted to join the NCJHL: two brand new teams - Blackburn Inferno and Bytown Royals; and two former CCHL Tier 2 teams - Metcalfe Jets and South Grenville Rangers, bringing the total to 12 teams.

In July 2017, the Rockland Nationals became the Les Castors de Clarence (Clarence Castors) after originally moving to Clarence to become the Jr. C version of the CCHL's Rockland Nationals. The CCHL2 Clarence Castors moved to Carleton Place to serve as an affiliation to the Carleton Place Canadians, calling themselves the Carleton Place Jr. Canadians.

The 2019–2020 season was suspended due to the Covid-19 pandemic, before resuming in 2021 (although with the Inferno relocated to Almonte.)

== Current teams ==
Team	Centre	Founded
Cumberland Castors	Orleans, Ontario	1987
Kanata Kings	Kanata, Ontario	2017
Metcalfe Jets	Metcalfe, Ontario	1967
Morrisburg Lions	Morrisburg, Ontario	1971
North Dundas Rockets	Chesterville, Ontario	2011
South Grenville Rangers	Prescott, Ontario	2017
St-Isidore Eagles	St. Isidore de Prescott, Ontario	1974
Vankleek Hill Cougars	Vankleek Hill, Ontario	1991
Westport Rideaus	Westport, Ontario	2022

== John A. Cameron Trophy League Champions ==
John A. Cameron Trophy The EOJCHL Championship

Year	Champion	Finalist
1969	North Eamers Corners	
1970	Osnabruck Township Angels	
1971	Glen Walter Flyers	
1972	Char-Lan Optimist	
1973	Char-Lan Rebels	
1974	Cornwall Township Polaris	
1975	Char-Lan Rebels	
1976	Char-Lan Rebels	
1977	Chesterville Jets	
1978	Embrun 72's	
1979	Char-Lan Rebels	
1980	Embrun 72's	
1981	Crysler Raiders	
1982	Embrun 72's	
1983	Embrun 72's	
1984	Alexandria Glens	
1985	Chesterville Flyers	
1986	Chesterville Flyers	
1987	St. Isidore Eagles	
1988	Rockland Nationals	
1989	Casselman Stars	
1990	St. Isidore Eagles	
1991	St. Isidore Eagles	
1992	Vankleek Hill Cougars	
1993	Casselman Stars	
1994	Embrun 72's	
1995	Embrun 72's	
1996	Embrun 72's	
1997	Embrun 72's	
1998	Casselman Stars	
1999	Casselman Stars	
2000	Casselman Stars	
2001	Embrun Panthers	Vankleek Hill Cougars
2002	Embrun Panthers	Vankleek Hill Cougars
2003	Vankleek Hill Cougars	Rockland Nationals
2004	Embrun Panthers	Rockland Nationals
2005	Casselman Stars	Embrun Panthers

Year	Champion	Finalist
2006	Embrun Panthers	Casselman Stars
2007	East Ottawa Thunder	Embrun Panthers
2008	East Ottawa Thunder	Embrun Panthers
2009	Embrun Panthers	East Ottawa Thunder
2010	Embrun Panthers	Rockland Nationals
2011	Embrun Panthers	Rockland Nationals
2012	Embrun Panthers	St. Isidore Eagles
2013	Cumberland Bandits	St. Isidore Eagles
2014	Embrun Panthers	Vankleek Hill Cougars
2015	Papineauville Vikings	Embrun Panthers
2016	Papineauville Vikings	Embrun Panthers
2017	Embrun Panthers	North Dundas Rockets
2018	Papineau Vikings	North Dundas Rockets
2019	Vankleek Hill Cougars	Clarence Castors
2020	Playoffs cancelled - covid	
2021	Playoffs cancelled - covid	
2022	Clarence Castors	South Grenville Rangers
2023	Gatineau Hull-Volants	Clarence Castors
2024	Gatineau Hull-Volants	Vankleek Hill Cougars
2025	Gatineau Hull-Volants	Vankleek Hill Cougars
2026	Vankleek Hill Cougars	Westport Rideaus

== 2026 playoffs ==
Quarter Finals
1	Vankleek Hill	4
8	Morrisburg	0
4	South Grenville	3
5	St-Isidore	2
2	Kanata	4
7	Metcalfe	0
3	Westport	4
6	Cumberland	0

Semi Finals
1	Vankleek Hill	0
2	Kanata	0
3	Westport	0

Finals

=== Quarterfinals ===
==== (1) Vankleek Hill Cougars vs. (8) Morrisburg Lions ====
February 14	Morrisburg Lions	2 - 4	Vankleek Hill Cougars	Vankleek Hill Community Centre	Recap
11:42 - (1) Eliott Chisholm		First period	16:50 - (1) Drew Synnott
No scoring		Second period	11:10 - (1) Avery MacCuaig; 7:10 - (1) Bruno Laframboise
5:10 - (1) Zach Wilson		Third period	16:40 - (1) Ryder Hill
Jesse Rabuka (0-1, 30 saves / 34 shots)		Goalie stats	Mael Gendron (1-0, 20 saves / 22 shots)

February 15	Vankleek Hill Cougars	3 - 2	Morrisburg Lions	Morrisburg Arena	Recap
No scoring		First period	No Scoring
10:43 - (1) Jacob Crete		Second period	7:04 - (1) Peter Ford; 6:26 - (1) Evan Rice
16:55 - (1) Nolan MacMillan; 12:13 - (1) Bradley Horner		Third period	No Scoring

February 21	Morrisburg Lions	0 - 7	Vankleek Hill Cougars	Vankleek Hill Community Centre	Recap
No scoring		First period	15:37 - (1) Rylan Wolowicz; 12:03 - (1) Mike Fournier; 4:39 - (1) Xavier Plante
No scoring		Second period	10:04 - (2) Nolan MacMillan; 4:06 - (2) Ryder Hill
No scoring		Third period	6:55 - (3) Nolan MacMillan; 6:17 - (4) Nolan MacMillan

February 22	Vankleek Hill Cougars	10-1	Morrisburg Lions	Morrisburg Arena	Recap
10:45 - (1) Cody Horner		First period	No scoring
14:04 - (2) Cody Horner; 2:35 - (1) Liam Lynn; 1:54 - (2) Liam Lynn; 0:37 - (2) Mike Fournier		Second period	17:36 - (1) Jordan Elliott
15:38 - (1) Zach Sullivan; 12:29 - (2) Zach Sullivan (2) Bruno Laframboise; 7:03 - (3) Liam Lynn; 4:12 - (4) Liam Lynn		Third period	No scoring

Vankleek Hill wins 4-0

==== (4) South Grenville Rangers vs. (5) St-Isidore Eagles ====
February 14	St-Isidore Eagles	4 - 6	South Grenville Rangers	Alaine Chartrand Community Centre	Recap
3:49 - (1) Tyler Proulx		First period	13:41 - (1) Eric Judson; 12:50 - (1) Brock Seed
4:47 - (2) Tyler Proulx		Second period	1:54 - (1) Evan Deir
2:04 - (1) Justin Cloutier; 1:39 - (1) Eloi Cayer		Third period	15:07 - (1) Mason Wight; 9:56 - (1) Ethan Woller; 0:01 - (1) Rhett Cleverdon

February 15	South Grenville Rangers	1 - 4	St-Isidore Eagles	St. Isidore Recreation Centre	Recap
No Scoring		First period	6:03 - (1) Nicolas Elie; 5:38 - (3) Tyler Proulx
7:53 - (1) Ty Chevrier		Second period	13:42 - (1) Maxime Patenaude (1) Justin-Samuel Fortin
No scoring		Third period	No scoring

February 20	South Grenville Rangers	6 - 2	St-Isidore Eagles	St. Isidore Recreation Centre	Recap
10:56 - (2) Eric Judson; 1:46 - (2) Brock Seed		First period	No scoring
10:08 - (1) Logan Rasa; 7:51 - (2) Mason Wight; 3:41 - (3) Mason Wight		Second period	No scoring
5:16 - (4) Mason Wight		Third period	18:35 - (1) Hugo Gagne; 13:18 - (2) Hugo Gagne

February 21	St-Isidore Eagles	3 - 4	OT	South Grenville Rangers	Alaine Chartrand Community Centre	Recap
No scoring		First period		No scoring
10:16 - (1) Samuel Bisaillon		Second period		15:32 - (1) Ethan Wooller; 1:54 - (2) Logan Rasa
4:51 - (3) Brock Seed		Third period		10:57 - (2) Justin Cloutier; 6:05 - (1) Vincent Bastien
No scoring		First overtime period		4:57 - (1) Cole Hennessy
Noah Allard (0-2, 49 saves / 53 shots)		Goalie stats		Bryce Kijewski (3-0, 37 saves / 40 shots)

February 22	South Grenville Rangers	4 - 6	St-Isidore Eagles	St. Isidore Recreation Centre	Recap
6:43 - (2) Ethan Wooller; 1:59 - (5) Mason Wight		First period	2:53 - (2) Maxime Patenaude; 2:37 - (1) Sydney Benoit
10:36 - (6) Mason Wight		Second period	6:42 - (1) Yanik Major; 3:06 - (2) Yanik Major
7:43 - (7) Mason Wight		Third period	12:25 - (3) Maxime Patenaude; 0:13 - (2) Nicholas Elie

February 28	St-Isidore Eagles	0 - 0	South Grenville Rangers	Alaine Chartrand Community Centre
TBD		First period	TBD
TBD		Second period	TBD
TBD		Third period	TBD

March 1	South Grenville Rangers	0 - 0	St-Isidore Eagles	St. Isidore Recreation Centre
TBD		First period	TBD
TBD		Second period	TBD
TBD		Third period	TBD

South Grenville leads 3-2

==== (2) Kanata Kings vs. (7) Metcalfe Jets ====
February 13	Kanata Kings	5 - 4	OT	Metcalfe Jets	Larry Robinson Arena	Recap
No scoring		First period		0:29 - (1) Zach Branchaud
12:17 - (1) Jordan Cruz; 7:05 - (1) Andrew Colley		Second period		17:35 - (1) Carter Marshall; 17:15 - (1) Simon Gagne
7:08 - (2) Jordan Cruz; 0:16 - (3) Jordan Cruz		Third period		15:27 - (1) George Carson
0:46 - (1) Chase Peck-		First overtime period		No scoring

February 14	Metcalfe Jets	2 - 3	OT	Kanata Kings	Recap
No scoring		First period		No scoring
17:43 - (2) Carter Marshall		Second period		10:07 - (1) Landon Lowes
7:08 - (1) Ryan Spenst		Third period		17:06 - (1) Owen Brown
No Scoring		First overtime period		4:59 - (2) Andrew Colley
Matthew Saari (0-2, 49 saves / 52 shots)		Goalie stats		Ethan Dinsdale (1-0, 33 saves / 35 shots)

February 20	Kanata Kings	3 - 2	Metcalfe Jets	Larry Robinson Arena	Recap
No scoring		First period	No scoring
14:09 - (1) Nolan Shail; 6:59 - (1) Yamato Montcalm; 5:27 - (3) Andrew Colley		Second period	2:00 - (1) Nick Spirito
No scoring		Third period	19:20 - (2) Ryan Spenst

February 22	Metcalfe Jets	3 - 4	Kanata Kings	Recap
6:13 - (3) Ryan Spenst		First period	No scoring
14:53 - (1) Jake Fisher		Second period	4:05 - (4) Andrew Colley; 2:29 - (1) Serhii Levchenko
5:17 - (2) Zach Branchaud		Third period	16:39 - (1) Brayden Brown; 11:18 - (4) Jordan Cruz
Cedric Nadon (0-1, 28 saves / 32 shots)		Goalie stats	Ethan Dinsdale (2-0, 34 saves / 37 shots)

Kanata wins 4-0

==== (3) Westport Rideaus vs. (6) Cumberland Castors ====
February 13	Cumberland Castors	1 - 3	Westport Rideaus	WTC Communications Centre	Recap
No scoring		First period	12:00 - (1) Noah Cyr
3:11 - (1) Liam Kirby		Second period	No scoring
No Scoring		Third period	17:16 - (2) Noah Cyr; 0:36 - (1) Nolan Campbell

February 15	Westport Rideaus	3 - 2	Cumberland Castors	Ray Friel Recreation Complex	Recap
13:43 - (1) Lukas Hannah; 9:59 - (1) Braeden Belot; 8:52 (1) Ethan Fowler		First period	No scoring
No scoring		Second period	17:57 - (1) Cohen George; 14:52 - (1) Andrew Baccardax
No scoring		Third period	No scoring
Ben Spicer (2-0, 37 saves / 39 shots)		Goalie stats	Cedrik Dandenault (0-2, 28 saves / 31 shots); Tristan Batista (6 saves / 6 shots)

February 21	Cumberland Castors	1 - 3	Westport Rideaus	WTC Communications Centre	Recap
No scoring		First period	17:29 - (1) Connor Jackson
No scoring		Second period	No scoring
15:27 - (2) Liam Kirby		Third period	15:21 - (1) Chad Carroll; 1:03 - (2) Braden Belot
Cedrik Dandenault (37 saves / 40 shots)		Goalie stats	Ben Spicer (3-0, 31 saves / 32 shots)

February 22	Westport Rideaus	8 - 3	Cumberland Castors	Ray Friel Recreation Complex	Recap
16:52 - (2) Connor Jackson; 10:45 - (3) Chad Carroll		First period	13:55 - (1) Ethan Silvestre; 1:16 - (1) Sebastien Cossette
		Second period	No scoring
		Third period

Westport wins 4-0

== Former teams ==
- Alexandria Glens
- Almonte Inferno 2011-2025. Sold and relocated to become the Kanata Kings 2025.
- Blackburn Inferno 2017-2018 expansion team from Blackburn Hamlet re-located to Carp 2018 and eventually Almonte in 2021.
- Bytown Royals 2017-2021
- Char-Lan Rebels
- Casselman Stars
- Cumberland Bandits 1986-2018 took leave of absence - never returned
- Embrun Panthers (1972-2017) - join the CCHL2
- Cornwall Township Flyers
- Long Sault Vipers
- Outaouais Jr. Académie
- Papineau Vikings 1998-2018. relocated to Stittsville as Ottawa Valley Lightning
- Russell Lions
- North Stormont Express
- Maxville Mustangs
- Gatineau Hull-Volants 2015-2025 - left to join Laurentides-Lanaudière/Laval Jr B league.
