= Essex 73's =

Canadian junior ice hockey team

- City: Essex, Ontario
- League: Provincial Junior Hockey League
- Division: Bill Stobbs
- Founded: 1973
- Colours: Orange, Black, and White
- General manager: Matt Puempel
- Head coach: Matt Puempel

Championships
- League champions: 1975, 1976, 1977, 1978, 1981, 1986, 1987, 1998, 2002, 2003, 2005, 2006, 2007, 2008, 2009, 2012, 2013, 2014, 2015, 2016, 2017, 2025
- Clarence Schmalz Cups: 1975, 1977, 1978, 2002, 2005, 2009, 2015

The Essex 73's are a Canadian junior ice hockey team based in Essex, Ontario. The 73's are members of the Provincial Junior Hockey League and the Ontario Hockey Association. Prior to becoming members of the PJHL in 2016 the 73's won the GLJHL playoff championship 20 times and the Clarence Schmalz Cup as Provincial Junior C Champions 7 times.

== History ==
The Essex 73's have competed in the Great Lakes Junior C Hockey League since the 1973–74 season. In total, the club has won 20 Great Lakes Junior C League Championships and 7 All-Ontario Junior C titles. By both measures, they are the most successful team in Great Lakes Junior C Hockey League history. Their 7 Clarence Schmalz Cup (CSC) wins and 14 CSC finals appearances are both Ontario Junior C records.

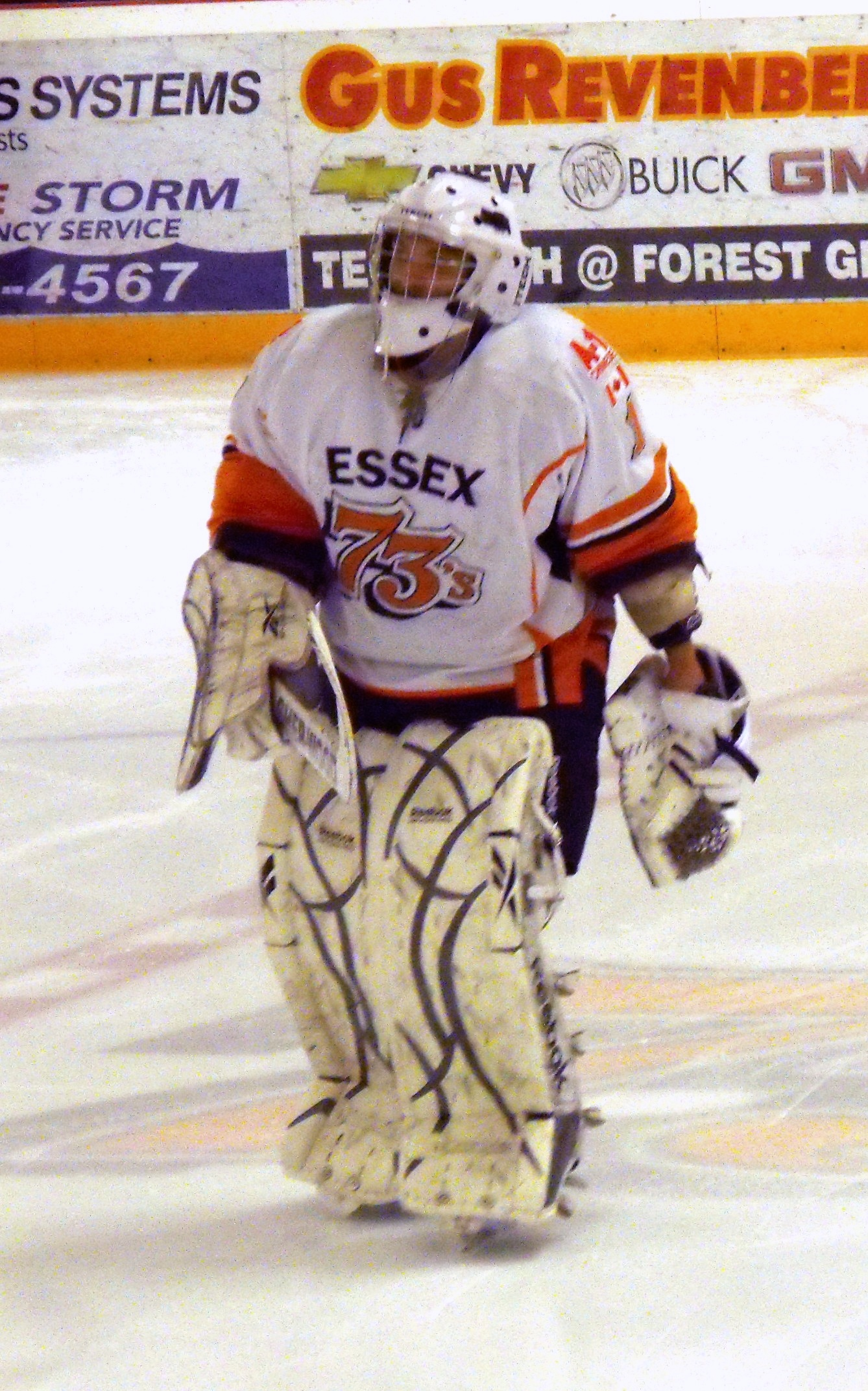
Essex goalie warming up during 2012 playoffs

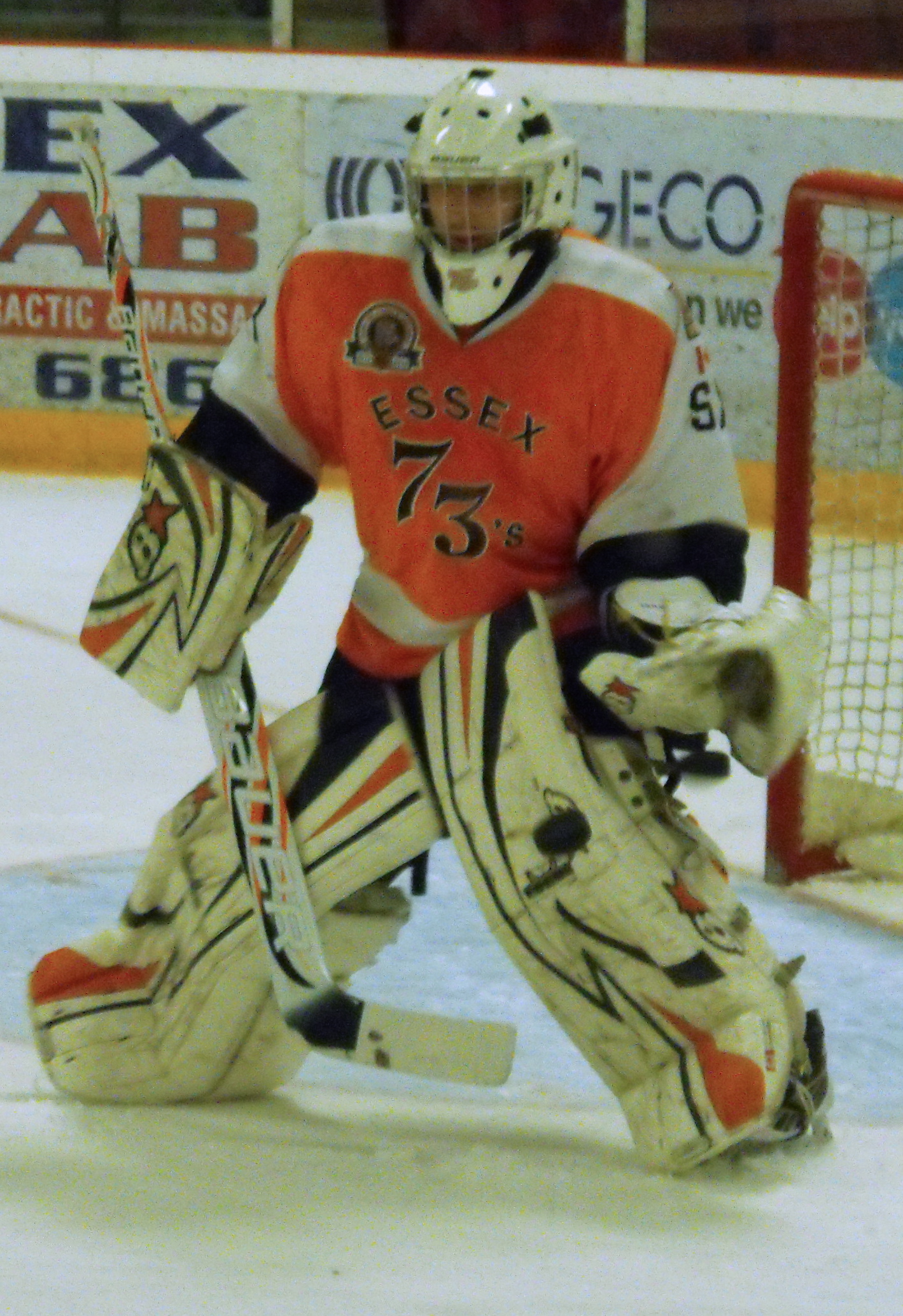
73's goalie in 40th anniversary commemorative jersey during 2013 Schmalz Cup finals

With Dave Prpich behind the bench, the 73's won four league titles in a row from 1974–1975 to 1977–1978, including three All-Ontario Championships in that span. The 73's would claim two more Great Lakes League Championships in the 1980s in 1985–1986 and 1986–1987.

After some struggles in the early to mid-1990s, the 73's got back into winning form, taking the title for the first time in ten years. In 1997–1998 the team won the Great Lakes League Championship by defeating the Wallaceburg Lakers in the league final. Their loss to the Kincardine Bulldogs in the All-Ontario semifinals marked the 73's most successful season in a decade.

In the 2001–2002 season, general manager Al Lemay brought aboard head coach Tony Piroski, who coached the team from 2001 to 2010. The 73's had great success under Piroski, and in his first season the 73's won the Great Lakes League and the All-Ontario Title, defeating the Uxbridge Bruins in the finals.

On September 27, 2003, 19-year-old forward Glen Ivancic was fatally stabbed in Windsor. A banner #25 hung from the rafters at the Essex Memorial Arena for years before it was given to his parents.

The team reached the All-Ontario Junior C Finals five straight seasons (tying an Ontario Junior C Record), defeating the Grimsby Peach Kings in 2005 but losing to the Penetang Kings in 2006 and 2007. In 2008 they faced the offensive powerhouse Alliston Hornets and were defeated in a memorable game 7 overtime loss in Essex. The 2008–2009 season saw the 73's finish with a remarkable 59 wins, 1 overtime loss, 1 regulation loss, and 1 shoot-out loss (including play-offs). The team finished with 31 wins and 0 losses at home in their final season in the historic Essex Memorial Arena. The 73's returned to the finals in 2009 to face Alliston for the second straight year and the 73's fifth consecutive Clarence Schmalz Cup Finals appearance. Essex overwhelmed Alliston on their way to a four-game sweep to win the provincial title. In nine seasons under Piroski the 73's won seven Great Lakes League Championships and claimed the Clarence Schmalz Cup three times as All-Ontario Champions.

The 73's re-hired Les Garrod to the team in the 2010–11 season; the team would finish second place to the Belle River Canadiens and go out in the first round to the Wheatley Sharks in seven games. It would be the first time in 15 years (1996–97) that the team did not make it out of the First round. Garrod and staff would not be back the following year.

The 73's brought aboard former Windsor Spitfire Scott Miller for the 2011 season as the club's general manager and hired former Lasalle Vipers assistant Gil Langois as head coach. This tandem delivered four consecutive Great Lakes League Championships and three Clarence Schmalz Cup Finals appearances, including one OHA Junior C Championship. In 2013 the 73's swept both Ayr and the familiar Niagara champion Grimsby before losing in the CSC finals 4 games to 1 to the Picton Pirates. 2014 featured a more difficult road to the CSC finals with a high-scoring 7-game quarterfinal against Dorchester along with a 5-game semifinal victory over the Western League champion Wingham Ironmen before the 73's were swept in the Schmalz Cup finals by the Lakefield Chiefs. In 2015 the 73's defeated Exeter in four games and Ayr in five qualifying for their third straight CSC appearance. In three closely contested games versus the Empire B champion Port Hope Panthers, the 73's built up a 3–0 series lead, but the Panthers stormed back, winning the next three games, setting up a winner-take-all game 7 in Port Hope. A lone second-period goal was the difference between the teams as the 73's clinched their seventh CSC All-Ontario Championship and first since 2009.

In the summer of 2016 the eight junior "C" leagues amalgamated under the Provincial, and the GLJHL became the Bill Stobbs Division of the new league. During the 2016–17 season, the 73's won their first Stobbs Division title but fell to the Ayr Centennials in the PJHL semi-final.

In 2017–2018, the Essex 73's streak of six straight League Championships came to an end as the Lakeshore Canadiens defeated the 73's in five games in the Stobbs Division Finals. The Canadiens were coached by former 73's player and coach Anthony Iaquinta.

2018-2019 saw Gil Langlois return as Head Coach of the 73's and guided the 73's to a first-place finish. The 73's would sweep their first two rounds against the Petrolia Flyers and Amherstburg Admirals setting up a rematch against the Lakeshore Canadiens in the division Finals. The Canadiens would repeat as Stobbs Champions knocking off the 73's in five games.

In 2019 Gil Langlois retired, and was replaced as coach by former Sarnia Sting player Danny Anger.

Essex celebrated its 50th season in 2022 and established a Wall of Honour, to pay tribute to those individuals who had a significant impact on the overall success of the organization. Three categories were developed; Player Category, Coach & Staff Category and Honorary Category.

Essex announced that former assistant coach, Jamie McDermott would take over the head coaching duties to start the 2022–23 season. Under McDermott, the 73's would finish first overall in the Provincial Junior Hockey League regular season standings with a 36-4-2-0 but would eventually fall in the Stobbs Division finals to the Lakeshore Canadiens.

After the 2022–23 season, McDermott stepped down from the head coaching duties citing family and health as his reasons and the 73's would hire Matt Ridout, their 20th coach in franchise history. Ridout would not last in Essex very long as Manager, Mike Pailey, relieved Ridout of his duties after just 15 games behind the bench, despite having the best record in the Provincial Junior Hockey league at the time, 16-1-0-1. The organization announced difference in direction the team was going as the contributing factor to Ridout's dismissal.

Pailey took over as interim head coach and after guiding the team to 4-1-1-1 record, he announced the hiring of former 73's head coach, Tony Piroski. In Piroski, the 73's had a seasoned coach with nearly 300 wins under his belt at the Jr. C level. Piroski would finish the regular season with a 15-2-0-0 record giving the 73's an overall season record of 35-4-1-2, third place overall in the Provincial Junior Hockey League.

Essex 73's defeated Dresden and Blenheim from the playoffs in sweeping fashion and met the Lakeshore Canadiens for the fourth consecutive season in the Stobbs Division finals. The 73's would lose in seven games to the Canadiens who went on to win the Schmalz Cup.

== Season-by-season results ==
Season	GP	W	L	T	OTL	GF	GA	P	Results	Playoffs
1973-74	44	34	6	4	-	357	160	72	1st GLJHL	Won semi-final 4-1 (Lakers); Lost Final 0-4 (Flyers)
1974-75	42	33	8	1	-	292	155	67	1st GLJHL	Won semi-final 4-0 (Flags); Won League 4-0 (Flyers); Won CSC SF 4-3 (Hahns); Won CSC Final 4-3 (Muskies)
1975-76	42	30	9	3	-	297	159	63	1st GLJHL	Won semi-final 4-1 (Lakers); Won League 4-3 (Kings); Won CSC SF 4-2 (Mustangs); Lost CSC Final 2-4 (Terriers)
1976-77	42	27	11	4	-	236	164	58	1st GLJHL	Won semi-final 4-3 (Blades); Won League 4-3 (Kings); Won CSC SF 4-0 (Cyclones); Won CSC Final 4-2 (Eagles)
1977-78	42	39	2	1	-	377	105	79	1st GLJHL	Won semi-final 3-0 (Lakers); Won League 4-1 (Kings); Won CSC QF 4-1 (Cyclones); Won CSC SF 4-0 (Sabres); Won CSC Final 4-1 (Eagles)
1978-79	40	25	13	2	-	291	222	52	2nd GLJHL	Lost semi-final 1-3 (Flyers)
1979-80	42	25	13	4	-	280	215	54	2nd GLJHL	Won semi-final 4-1 (Lakers); Lost final 2-4 (Flyers)
1980-81	42	32	7	3	-	325	165	67	1st GLJHL	Won semi-final 4-1 (Vikings); Won League 4-3 (Flyers); Won CSC quarter-final 4-1 (Ironmen); Won CSC semi-final 4-3 (Navy-Vets); Lost CSC Final 2-4 (Eagles)
1981-82	39	23	13	3	-	241	177	49	3rd GLJHL	Won quarter-final 3-0 (Canadiens); Won semi-final 4-3 (Flags); Lost final 1-4 (Flyers)
1982-83	40	19	17	4	-	244	232	42	4th GLJHL	Lost quarter-final 2-3 (Canadiens)
1983-84	39	14	20	5	-	221	204	33	6th GLJHL	Lost quarter-final 2-3 (Flyers)
1984-85	40	26	11	3	-	254	161	55	2nd GLJHL	Won quarter-final 3-0 (Lakers); Won semi-final 4-0 (Kings); Lost final 1-4 (Canadiens)
1985-86	40	25	9	6	-	229	144	56	1st GLJHL	Won quarter-final 3-1 (Blades); Won semi-final 4-1 (Flyers); Won League 4-3 (Flags); Won CSC quarter-final 4-2 (Barons); Lost CSC semi-final 2-4 (Merchants)
1986-87	38	26	11	1	0	236	163	53	2nd GLJHL	Won quarter-final 4-0 (Vikings); Won semi-final 4-3 (Flyers); Won League 4-2 (Kings); Lost CSC quarter-final 2-4 (Barons)
1987-88	39	18	15	4	2	210	167	42	6th GLJHL	Won quarter-final 4-1 (Canadiens); Lost semi-final 1-4 (Flyers)
1988-89	38	19	15	2	2	210	184	44	7th GLJHL	Lost South semi-final 0-4 (Flyers)
1989-90	40	9	30	1	0	129	260	19	10th GLJHL	DNQ
1990-91	42	19	19	2	2	190	195	42	6th GLJHL	Lost South semi-final 1-4 (Vikings)
1991-92	41	22	15	3	1	203	169	48	4th GLJHL	Won South semi-final 4-1 (Vikings); Lost South final 0-4 (Canadiens)
1992-93	40	14	24	1	1	166	224	30	9th GLJHL	DNQ
1993-94	40	16	22	2	0	206	232	34	8th GLJHL	DNQ
1994-95	41	10	26	3	2	133	204	25	10th GLJHL	DNQ
1995-96	41	16	18	7	0	150	145	39	8th GLJHL	DNQ
1996-97	40	20	16	2	2	161	162	44	6th GLJHL	Lost quarter-final 0-4 (Comets)
1997-98	45	27	12	6	0	210	132	60	3rd GLJHL	Won quarter-final 4-3 (Comets); Won semi-final 4-0 (Sharks); Won League 4-1 (Lakers); Lost CSC semi-final 2-4 (Bulldogs)
1998-99	39	31	7	1	0	213	122	63	3rd GLJHL	Won quarter-final 4-0 (Blades); Lost semi-final 2-4 (Lakers)
1999-00	39	17	16	2	4	139	153	40	5th GLJHL	Won quarter-final 4-2 (Flags); Lost semi-final 0-4 (Canadiens)
2000-01	40	22	12	6	0	153	143	50	4th GLJHL	Won quarter-final 4-3 (Flags); Lost semi-final 2-4 (Canadiens)
2001-02	40	30	8	0	2	159	97	62	1st GLJHL	Won quarter-final 4-0 (Kings); Won semi-final 4-1 (Flags); Won League 4-1 (Sharks); Won CSC semi-final 4-0 (Navy-Vets); Won CSC 4-3 (Bruins)
2002-03	40	33	4	3	0	161	91	69	1st GLJHL	Won quarter-final 4-3 (Flags); Won semi-final 4-2 (Comets); Won League 4-0 (Sharks); Lost CSC semi-final 2-4 (Peach Kings)
2003-04	40	33	3	4	0	152	77	70	1st GLJHL	Won quarter-final 4-0 (Blades); Won semi-final 4-1 (Sharks); Lost final 2-4 (Kings)
2004-05	40	32	5	1	2	206	81	67	1st GLJHL	Won quarter-final 4-0 (Blades); Won semi-final 4-3 (Sharks); Won League 4-1 (Kings); Won CSC semi-final 4-0 (Ironmen); Won CSC 4-3 (Peach Kings)
2005-06	40	25	11	3	1	160	99	54	4th GLJHL	Won quarter-final 4-0 (Canadiens); Won semi-final 4-0 (Kings); Won League 4-2 (Sharks); Won CSC semi-final 4-0 (Storm); Lost CSC Final 1-4 (Kings)
2006-07	40	32	4	2	2	182	90	68	1st GLJHL	Won quarter-final 4-0 (Flags); Won semi-final 4-1 (Lakers); Won League 4-1 (Canadiens); Won CSC semi-final 4-0 (Peach Kings); Lost CSC Final 1-4 (Kings)
2007-08	40	33	3	2	2	216	91	70	1st GLJHL	Won South semi-final 4-1 (Sharks); Won South Final 4-1 (Canadiens); Won League 4-0 (Lakers); Won CSC semi-final 4-1 (Peach Kings); Lost CSC Final 3-4 (Hornets)
2008-09	40	39	0	-	1	202	73	79	1st GLJHL	Won South semi-final 4-0 (Comets); Won South Final 4-1 (Canadiens); Won League 4-0 (Kings); Won CSC semi-final 4-1 (Merchants); Won CSC, 4-0 (Hornets)
2009-10	40	29	9	-	2	187	101	60	2nd GLJHL	Won South semi-final 4-1 (Sharks); Lost South Final 2-4 (Canadiens)
2010-11	39	26	12	-	1	167	120	53	3rd GLJHL	Lost South semi-final 3-4 (Sharks)
2011-12	40	33	6	-	1	185	124	67	1st GLJHL	Won quarter-final 4-0 (Comets); Won semi-final 4-2 (Kings); Won League 4-1 (Canadiens); Lost CSC semi-final 1-4 (Peach Kings)
2012-13	40	32	6	-	2	205	89	66	1st GLJHL	Won quarter-final 4-0 (Comets); Won semi-final 4-0 (Kings); Won League 4-0 (Sharks); Won CSC quarter-final 4-0 (Centennials); Won CSC semi-final 4-1 (Peach Kings); Lost CSC final, 1-4 (Pirates)
2013-14	40	34	3	-	3	212	95	71	1st GLJHL	Won quarter-final 4-0 (Kings); Won semi-final 4-0 (Sharks); Won League 4-2 (Canadiens); Won CSC quarter-final 4-3 (Dolphins); Won CSC semi-final 4-1 (Ironmen); Lost CSC Final, 0-4 (Chiefs)
2014-15	40	33	5	-	2	193	85	68	1st GLJHL	Won quarter-final 4-0 (Flags); Won semi-final 4-0 (Kings); Won League 4-2 (Admirals); Won CSC quarter-final 4-0 (Hawks); Won CSC semi-final 4-1 (Centennials); Won CSC 4-3 (Panthers)
2015-16	40	34	3	1	2	216	74	71	1st GLJHL	Won quarter-final 4-0 (Flyers); Won semi-final 4-0 (Flags); Won League 4-3 (Admirals); Won CSC quarter-final 4-0 (Dolphins); Lost CSC semi-final 4-0 (Centennials)
2016-17	40	30	9	1	-	179	96	61	2nd Stobbs	Won quarter-final 4-1 (Flags); Won semi-final 4-0 (Admirals); Won League 4-0 (Canadiens); Won West Conference 4-1 (Dolphins); Lost CSC semi-final 3-4 (Centennials)
2017-18	40	26	11	0	3	157	82	55	3rd Stobbs	Won quarter-final 4-0 (Flyers); Won semi-final 4-2 (Kings); Lost final, 1-4 (Canadiens)
2018-19	40	29	6	1	4	165	86	63	1st of 9 Stobbs	Won quarter-final 4-0 (Flyers); Won semi-final 4-0 (Admirals); Lost final 1-4 (Canadiens)
2019-20	40	23	15	1	1	137	94	48	4th of 9 Stobbs	Won quarter-final 4-2 (Sharks); Lost semi-final 1-4 (Canadiens)
2020-21	Season Lost due to COVID-19 pandemic									
2021-22	32	25	6	0	1	165	66	51	2nd of 9 Stobbs	Won quarter-final 4-0 (Flyers); Won semi-final 4-1 (Flags); Lost final 2-4 (Canadiens)
2022-23	42	36	4	2	0	200	66	74	1st of 8 Stobbs	Won quarter-final 4-0 (Thunderhawks); Won semi-final 4-2 (Flags); Lost final 1-4 (Canadiens)
2023-24	42	35	4	1	2	245	85	73	2nd of 8 Stobbs	Won quarter-final 4-0 (Kings); Won semi-final 4-0 (Blades); Lost final 3-4 (Canadiens)
2024-25	42	37	4	0	1	260	77	75	1st of Stobbs Div; 1st of 16 West Conf; 2nd of 35 - PJHL	Won Did Quarterfinal 4-0 (Wild); Won Div Semifinal 4-1 (Blades); Won Div Final 4-2 (Canadiens); Won West Conference 4-0 (Flyers); Won CSC semi-final 4-1 (Firebirds); Lost CSC Final 0-4 (Barons)
2025-26	42	37	4	0	1	202	83	75	1st of Stobbs Div; 1st of 16 West Conf; 2nd of 35 - PJHL	Won Did Quarterfinal 4-0 (Wild); Won Div Semifinal 4-1 (Admirals); Lost Div Final 3-4 (Canadiens)

== Clarence Schmalz Cup appearances ==
1975: Essex 73's defeated Lindsay Muskies 4-games-to-3
1976: Dunnville Terriers defeated Essex 73's 4-games-to-2
1977: Essex 73's defeated Bowmanville Eagles 4-games-to-2
1978: Essex 73's defeated Bowmanville Eagles 4-games-to-1
1981: Bowmanville Eagles defeated Essex 73's 4-games-to-2
2002: Essex 73's defeated Uxbridge Bruins 4-games-to-3
2005: Essex 73's defeated Grimsby Peach Kings 4-games-to-3
2006: Penetang Kings defeated Essex 73's 4-games-to-1
2007: Penetang Kings defeated Essex 73's 4-games-to-1
2008: Alliston Hornets defeated Essex 73's 4-games-to-3
2009: Essex 73's defeated Alliston Hornets 4-games-to-none
2013: Picton Pirates defeated Essex 73's 4-games-to-1
2014: Lakefield Chiefs defeated Essex 73's 4-games-to-none
2015: Essex 73's defeated Port Hope Panthers 4-games-to-3
2025: Hanover Barons defeated Essex 73's 4-games-to-none

== General managers ==
List of general managers:

- 1973–1974 - Herb Rounding
- 1974–1983 - Mike Sadler
- 1983–1987 - Mickey McDermott
- 1987–1988 - Mike Quinlan
- 1988–1989 - Don Leonard
- 1989–1990 - Dan Mills
- 1990–1991 - Mike Klyn
- 1991–1993 - Don McDermott
- 1993–1994 - Tom Mailloux
- 1994–1995 - Glen O'Neil
- 1995–1997 - Les Garrod
- 1997–2002 - Al Lemay
- 2002–2003 - Jim Rauth
- 2003–2005 - Al Lemay
- 2005–2010 - Mark Barnett
- 2010–2011 - Les Garrod
- 2011–2017 - Scott Miller
- 2017–2018 - Cam Crowder / Steve Caldwell
- 2018–2020 - Steve Cardwell
- 2020–2026 - Mike Pailey

== Coaches ==
List of coaches:

- 1973–74 - Jim Peck
- 1974–79 - Dave Prpich
- 1979–80 - Dave Moore
- 1980–82 - Dave Prpich
- 1982–84 - Bill Bellaire
- 1984–87 - Mike Quinlan
- 1987–89 - Dan Mills
- 1989–90 - Lee Jones
- 1990–91 - Mike Klym
- 1991–93 - Don McDermott
- 1993–94 - Rod Isbister
- 1994–95 - Glen O'Neil
- 1995–98 - Les Garrod
- 1998–99 - Mike Gomes
- 1999–2001 - Les Garrod
- 2001–10 - Tony Piroski
- 2010–11 - Glen Holden
- 2011–16 - Gil Langlois
- 2016–18 - Cam Crowder
- 2018–19 - Gil Langlois
- 2019–22 - Danny Anger
- 2022–23 - Jamie McDermott
- 2023 - Mark Ridout
- 2023–26 - Tony Piroski

== Notable alumni ==
- Bruce Crowder
- Keith Crowder
- Dave Gagnon
- Warren Rychel
- Colton Fretter
- Dan O'Halloran
