= Vankleek Hill Cougars =

- City: Vankleek Hill, Ontario, Canada
- League: National Capital Junior Hockey League
- Founded: 1991
- Home arena: Vankleek Hill Community Centre
- Colours: Black, white, tan
- General manager: Franky Dopelhamer
- Head coach: Ryan Allen (2024-present) assistant coaches Zackary Bougie (2022-present, Keean Mceachern (2022-present)

Franchise history
- 1991–2004: Vankleek Hill Cougars
- 2004–2006: Vankleek Hill Roadrunners
- 2006–present: Vankleek Hill Cougars

The Vankleek Hill Cougars are a junior ice hockey team based in Vankleek Hill, Ontario. They play in the National Capital Junior Hockey League. The 1991–92 season marked the first season that the Cougars advanced to the league finals in the playoffs.

The 1991–92 season saw the Cougars win their first National Capital league championship, taking the finals in a 7 games series against Casselman.

== Season-by-season record ==
Note: GP = Games Played, W = Wins, L = Losses, T = Ties, OTL = Overtime Losses, GF = Goals for, GA = Goals against

Season	GP	W	L	T	OTL	GF	GA	Pts	Finish	Playoffs
2004–05	36	5	27	1	3	82	210	14	6th EOJCHL	Lost quarter-finals
2005–06	36	8	27	—	1	118	207	17	7th EOJCHL	Lost quarter-finals
2006–07	34	13	16	—	5	126	167	31	6th EOJCHL	Lost quarter-finals
2007–08	35	9	23	—	3	104	184	21	7th EOJCHL	Lost quarter-finals
2008–09	34	18	14	—	2	175	181	38	4th EOJCHL	Lost semi-finals
2009–10	34	13	17	—	4	164	186	30	7th EOJCHL	Lost quarter-finals
2010–11	34	15	18	—	1	181	181	31	6th NCJHL	Lost quarter-finals
2011–12	32	11	18	—	3	119	156	25	7th NCJHL	Lost quarter-finals
2012–13	34	6	25	1	2	104	174	15	8th NCJHL	
2013–14	32	16	16	—	0	146	147	32	4th NCJHL	Lost finals
2014–15	32	20	10	—	2	156	117	42	4th NCJHL	Lost quarter-finals, 3–4 (Bandits)
2015–16	34	19	15	—	0	146	150	38	3rd of 5, South; 4th of 10,	Lost div. semi-finals, 2–4 (Eagles)
2016–17	32	17	14	1	—	127	140	35	4th of 9, NCJHL	Won quarter-finals, 4–1 (Nationals); Lost semi-finals, 0–4 (Rockets)
2017–18	33	16	16	1	—	146	138	33	8th of 12, NCJHL	Won Play In, 1–0–1 (Lions); Lost quarter-finals, 1-4 (Rockets)
2018–19	36	25	11	—	0	188	133	50	2nd of 5, East; 2nd of 10,	Won quarterfinals, 4-2 (Royals); Won semifinals, 4-2 (Jr C Rangers); Won finals, 4-0 (Castors); National Capital Champions
2019–20	34	23	11	0	—	181	116	46	1st of 5, East; 2nd of 10, NCJHL	Lost quarterfinals, 2-4 (Volants)
2020–21	Covid									
2021–22	22	11	11	0	—	86	71	22	5th of 9, NCJHL	Lost quarterfinals, 2-3 (Volants)
2022–23	36	20	12	2	2	150	111	44	5th of 10, NCJHL	Lost quarterfinals, 2-3 (Volants)
2023–24	34	20	14	0	0	137	135	40	3rd of 10, NCJHL	Won quarterfinals, 4-1 (Eagles); Won semifinals, 4-1 (Lions); Lost League Finals 1-4 (Volants)
2024–25	34	23	9	1	1	158	91	48	3rd of 10, NCJHL	Won quarterfinals, 4-0 (Jets); Won semifinals, 4-3 (Rideaus); Lost League Finals 1-4 (Volants)
2025–26	32	31	0	0	1	187	52	63	1st of 9, NCJHL	Won quarterfinals, 4-0 (Lions); Won semifinals, 4-0 (Rangers); Won League Finals 4-2 (Rideaus); National Capital Champions

== Individual player awards ==
Season	Name	Award
1991–92	Ian McRae	Coach of the Year
1991–92	Daniel Savage	Playoff MVP
1992–93	Mike Horner	Regular Season MVP
1993–94	Joey Bedard	Best Defenseman
1993–94	Jason Hall	Most Sportsmanlike Player
1995–96	Jason Hall	Best Defensive Forward
1996–97	Carl St-Amant	Most Sportsmanlike Player
1998–99	Ian McRae	Coach of the Year
1998–99	Claude Lalonde	Most Improved Player
1998–99	Claude Lalonde	Most Sportsmanlike Player
1998–99	Claude Lalonde	Rookie of the Year
1999–00	Martin Côté	Best Defenseman
1999–00	Carl Lacroix	Regular Season MVP
2000–01	Martin Aubry	Rookie of the Year
2000–01	Luc Poirier	Best Defenseman
2000–01	Dan Tremblay	Best Defensive Forward
2001–02	Pat Johnson	Best Defensive Forward
2001–02	Pat Burroughs	Regular Season MVP
2001–02	Martin Côté	Best Defenseman
2002–03	Carl Lacroix	Playoff MVP
2002–03	Brett Chisholm	Rookie of the Year
2003–04	Mike Cunning	Regular Season MVP
2004–05	Pat Boudrias	Most Improved Player
2006–07	Pat Boudrias	Best Defensive Forward
2006–07	Alex Villeneuve	Most Sportsmanlike Player
2008–09	Hugues Chevrier	Most Improved Player
2010–11	Yannick Boudrias	Best Defensive Forward
2010–11	Yann Neveu	Top Scorer
