= Morrisburg Lions =

- City: Morrisburg, Ontario, Canada
- League: National Capital Junior Hockey League
- Founded: 1971
- Colours: Dark blue, white, gold
- President: Kolby latulippe
- General manager: Kolby latulippe
- Head coach: Steve Iwachniuk; Jamie Smith

The Morrisburg Lions are a Canadian junior ice hockey team based in Morrisburg, Ontario. They are members of the National Capital Junior Hockey League commencing with the 2015-16 season. Prior to this the Lions were members of the Eastern Ontario Junior Hockey League (EOJBHL) of Hockey Eastern Ontario and Hockey Canada

== History ==
At the conclusion of the 2014-15 season, the league announced it was re-organized to be more of a dedicated developmental league to the Central Canada Hockey League and renamed the league Central Canada Hockey League Tier 2. Initially, the league was to downsize to twelve teams (one feeder club for each Tier 1 team), however, it reduced to 16 teams, eliminating 6 of the current franchises, including the Akwesasne Wolves, Morrisburg Lions, Almonte Thunder, Gananoque Islanders, Gatineau Mustangs, and Shawville Pontiacs.

Morrisburg applied for membership to the National Capital Junior Hockey League. In April the Lions were accepted by a 9-0 vote.

== Season-by-season results ==
Season	GP	W	L	T	OTL	GF	GA	P	Results	Playoffs
1999-00	45	21	22	2	-	205	184	47	4th EO StLawr	Lost Division S-final
2000-01	45	22	19	4	-	214	191	48	3rd EO StLawr	Lost Division S-final
2001-02	45	16	24	5	-	162	199	37	5th EO StLawr	DNQ
2002-03	45	21	21	1	2	231	238	45	4th EO StLawr	Lost Division S-final
2003-04	45	10	30	1	4	164	256	25	5th EO StLawr	DNQ
2004-05	45	10	32	1	2	153	248	23	6th EO StLawr	DNQ
2005-06	45	25	17	2	1	265	220	53	3rd EO StLawr	Lost semi-final
2006-07	40	24	14	1	1	257	208	50	3rd EO StLawr	Lost Division S-final
2007-08	42	16	23	1	2	196	249	35	4th EO StLawr	Lost Division S-final
2008-09	42	2	39	0	1	125	357	5	5th EO StLawr	
2009-10	40	17	21	2	0	192	253	36	5th EO StLawr	DNQ
2010-11	42	14	25	0	3	168	230	31	4th EO StLawr	Lost Division S-Final
2011-12	42	13	28	0	1	154	219	27	5th EO StLawr	DNQ
2012-13	41	7	33	0	1	113	242	15	6th EO StLawr	DNQ
2013-14	41	7	32	1	1	124	220	16	6th EO StLawr	DNQ
2014-15	39	11	25	1	2	164	215	25	6th EO StLawr	DNQ
National Capital Junior Hockey League
2015-16	34	3	31	0	0	55	185	6	5th of 5 North; 10th of 10 NCJHL	DNQ
2016-17	32	9	21	2	0	127	195	20	8th of 9 NCJHL	Won - Play in Game 0-0 (Eagles; Lost quarterfinals, 0-4(Panthers)
2017-18	33	11	20	2	0	110	166	20	9th of 12 NCJHL	Lost Play In Series 0-1-1 (Cougars)
2018-19	36	6	27	3	0	104	218	15	4th of 5 West; 9th of 10 NCJHL	DNQ
2021-22	23	7	15	1	0	70	112	15	7th of 9 NCJHL	Lost Quarterfinals, 2-3 (Rangers)
2022-23	36	13	21	0	2	178	201	28	7th of 10 NCJHL	Lost Quarterfinals, 2-3 (Castors)
2023-24	34	21	12	1	0	163	137	43	2nd of 10 NCJHL	Won Quarterfinals, 4-1 (Rockets); Lost Semifinals, 1-4 (Cougars)
2024-25	34	12	21	1	0	124	158	25	7th of 10 NCJHL	Lost Quarterfinals, 1-4 (Rideaus)
2025-26	32	5	26	0	1	61	169	11	8th of 9 NCJHL	won Play In Game 6-2 (Rockets); Lost Quarterfinals, 0-4 (Cougars)
