= Embrun Panthers =

- City: Embrun, Ontario, Canada
- League: Eastern Ontario Junior Hockey League
- Founded: 1972
- Home arena: Aréna d'Embrun Arena
- Colours: Blue, white, red, orange
- Owner: Darrell Campbell
- General manager: Jay Campbell
- Head coach: Darrell Campbell & Jay Campbell
- Captain: John Frangione

Franchise history
- 1972-1998: Embruns 72's
- 1998-2000: Embrun-Russell River Rats
- 2000-Present: Embrun Panthers

The Embrun Panthers are a Canadian junior ice hockey team based in Embrun, Ontario. They play in the Eastern Ontario Junior Hockey League.

Prior to 2017, the Panthers were members of the National Capital Junior Hockey League.

== History ==
Founded in 1972, Embrun started out in the Eastern Ontario Junior B Hockey League. After 2 seasons, in 1974, the 72's dropped down to the EOJCHL. In 2010, the EOJCHL became the National Capital Junior Hockey League.

The Embrun Panthers (along with its former name, Embrun 72's) is the most successful team in the league, winning 18 times: 1978, 1980, 1982, 1983, 1994, 1995, 1996, 1997, 2001, 2002, 2004, 2006, 2009, 2010, 2011, 2012, 2014 and 2017.

They are also the team with the most consecutive championship wins (4 years in a row-twice) : 1994, 1995, 1996, 1997 and 2009, 2010, 2011, 2012.

== Season-by-season record ==
Note: GP = Games Played, W = Wins, L = Losses, T = Ties, OTL = Overtime Losses, GF = Goals for, GA = Goals against

Season	GP	W	L	T	OTL	GF	GA	Points	Finish	Playoffs
2000-01	30	21	7	0	2	186	93	44	2nd EOJCHL	Won League
2001-02	36	24	10	0	2	198	130	50	2nd EOJCHL	Won League
2002-03	35	20	12	1	2	171	122	43	4th EOJCHL	Lost semi-final
2003-04	36	24	9	1	2	164	99	51	2nd EOJCHL	Won League
2004-05	36	25	7	2	2	186	85	54	2nd EOJCHL	Lost final
2005-06	36	21	10	-	5	147	110	47	3rd EOJCHL	Won League
2006-07	34	19	13	-	2	147	111	40	3rd EOJCHL	Lost final
2007-08	35	25	7	-	3	144	96	53	2nd EOJCHL	Lost final
2008-09	34	27	5	-	2	183	112	56	1st EOJCHL	Won League
2009-10	34	25	6	-	3	180	91	53	1st EOJCHL	Won League
2010-11	34	30	2	-	2	222	81	62	1st NCJHL	Won League
2011-12	32	25	5	-	2	162	92	52	1st NCJHL	Won League
2012-13	34	19	12	-	3	156	107	41	3rd NCJHL	Lost semi-final
2013-14	32	24	6	-	2	172	106	50	2nd NCJHL	Won League
2014-15	32	26	5	-	1	178	88	53	1st NCJHL	Lost League
2015-16	34	28	6	-	-	215	88	56	1st NCJHL	Lost League
2016-17	32	22	8	2	-	171	99	46	1st NCJHL	Won League
CCHL2
2017-18	52	28	20	1	3	188	153	60	5th of 8 Martin; 9th of 16 CCHL2	Won Div. Qualifying 2-1 (Golden Knights); Lost div semi-final 0-4 (Vikings)
2018-19	44	13	24	6	1	114	170	33	7th of 8 Martin; 15th of 16 CCHL2	Did not make playoffs
2019-20	44	29	10	3	2	149	102	63	3rd of 8 Martin; 4th of 16 CCHL2	Incomplete Quarters 0-1 Canadians remaining playoffs cancelled due to covid-19
2020-21	Season lost to covid									
League returns to Eastern Onterio Junior Hockey league name
2021-22	42	30	12	0	0	165	87	60	2nd of 8 Martin; 3rd of 16 EOJHL	Lost Div. Semis 2-3 (Vikings)
2022-23	42	26	11	3	2	162	119	57	3rd of 8 Martin; 6th of 16 EOJHL	Won Div. Quarters 2-1 (Hawls); Lost Div. Semis 2-4 Vikings
2023-24	44	21	22	0	1	141	154	43	4th of 7 Martin; 9th of 14 EOJHL	Won Div. Quarters 3-2 (Hawls); Lost Div. Semis 1-4 (Golden Knights)
2024-25	48	21	21	4	2	144	167	48	4th of 6 Martin; 9th of 13 EOJHL	Lost Wild Card 2-3 (Brigade)
2025-26	44	12	20	7	5	116	173	36	5th of 6 Martin; 10th of 13 EOJHL	Lost Wild Card 1-3 (Hawks)

== All time title holders ==
Title	Player	Record
Most Goals	Charles Labonté & Francis Legault	110
Most Assists	Charles Labonté	151
Most Points	Charles Labonté	261
Most Penalty Minutes	Brad Hampton	750
Most Games Played	Brad Hampton	215

== Awards ==
Award	Year	Player
Playoff MVP	2014	Robbie Gifford
	2012	Andrew Hampton
	2011	Shane Hodgins
	2010	Matt Nooyen & Derek West
	2009	Shane Hodgins
	2006	Josselin St-Pierre
	2004	Jonathon MacLean
	2002	Kyle Fetch
	2001	Brad Kennedy
Regular Season MVP	2016	Adam Fillion
	2011	Shane Hodgins
	2003	Pat Hamel
	2001	Brad Kennedy
Top scorer	2016	Adam Fillion
Best Defenceman	2011	Shane Hodgins
	2010	Nikola Brassard-Dion
	2008	Ben Carrière
	2005	Jonathan White
	2004	Philippe Blanchard
Best Defensive Forward	2017	Cody Lavictoire
	2016	Shawn Ennis
	2015	Scott Fleming
	2012	Francis Legault
	2008	Matt Nooyen
	2003	Jonathon MacLean
Most Improved Player	2016	Daniel Cogan
	2013	Eric Garrioch
	2010	Scott Downey
	2008	Derek West
	2003	Michael White
	2001	Pat Hamel
Most Sportsmanlike Player	2013	Mathieu Grégoire
	2005	Pat Giroux
	2001	Nicolas Bruyère
Rookie of the Year	2014	Harrison Wood
	2011	David Bobak
	2008	Gabriel Brisson
Best Goaltender	2016	Dana Pollex
	2015	Dana Pollex
	2011	Ben Larcoque
	2009	Roch Lamoureux/Michael Mills
	2007	Roch Lamoureux/Michael Mills
	2004	Tommy Rogerson
	2002	Doug Long
	2001	Doug Long
Executive of the Year	2017	Maurice Lemieux
Coach(es) of the Year	2017	Jay Campbell and Brad Hampton
	2011	Darrell Campbell, Richard Bercuson and Jay Campbell
	2010	Darrell Campbell, Richard Bercuson and Jay Campbell
	2004	Darrell Campbell
	2002	Marty Chesser
	2001	Marty Chesser

== Team honours ==
- League champions: 2017, 2014, 2012, 2011, 2010, 2009, 2006, 2004, 2002, 2001, 1997, 1996, 1995, 1994, 1983, 1982, 1980, 1978.
- Regular Season Champions: 2017, 2016, 2015, 2012, 2011 (East Division), 2010 (East Division), 2009 (East Division), 1997, 1996, 1995, 1994, 1985, 1984, 1983, 1981, 1980, 1978.
- Top Defensive Team: 2017 (99 GA), 2016 (88 GA), 2015 (88 GA), 2014 (106 GA), 2012 (92 GA), 2011 (81 GA), 2010 (91 GA), 2009 (112 GA), 2008 (96 GA), 2006 (110 GA), 2005 (85 GA), 2004, 2001.
