= Allison Smith =

Alison or Allison Smith may refer to:

== Sportswomen ==
- Allison Smith (swimmer) (born 1960), Australian Olympian in 1976
- Alison Smith (sport shooter), New Zealand Paralympic sport shooter in 1984
- Alison Smith (tennis) (born 1970), English player at 1994 Wimbledon

== Writers ==
- Alison Smith (critic) (c.1892–1943), American author of film and theater criticism
- Alison Smith (journalist) (born 1954), Canadian television and radio journalist and anchor
- Alison Mary Smith (born 1954), English professor of plant biochemistry at University of East Anglia
- Alison Gail Smith, English professor of plant biochemistry at University of Cambridge since 2007
- Alison Smith (curator), English chief curator at National Portrait Gallery, London, active since 1990s

== Others ==
- Allison T. Smith (1902–1970), Canadian member of Nova Scotia House of Assembly
- Allison Smith (actress) (born 1969), American actress
- Allison Smith (artist) (born 1972), American artist
- Allison Smith, Calgarian voice artist who records Asterisk system prompts

== Characters ==
- Alison Smith, member of Women's Land Army portrayed by Sheila Sim in 1944 British film A Canterbury Tale

== See also ==
- Alison Sealy-Smith (born 1959), Canadian actress, born and raised in Barbados
- Ali Smith (born 1962), Scottish writer
- Alison Smyth (disambiguation)
