= St. Paul High School (Ottawa) =

Location
- 2675 Draper Avenue; Ottawa, Ontario, K2H 7A1; Canada; 45.341741°N 75.792779°W

Information
- School type: Separate high school
- Motto: Fill Your Minds With All That Is True
- Religious affiliation: Catholic
- Founded: 1978 NBA draft
- School board: Ottawa Catholic School Board
- Superintendent: Ben Vallati
- Area trustee: Eugene Milito
- Principal: Alanna Vandewinter
- Teaching staff: 65
- Grades: 7–12
- Enrollment: 950 (2016)
- Language: English, French
- Hours in school day: 6
- Colours: Gold, Blue, White
- Mascot: Golden Bear
- Team name: St. Paul Golden Bears
- Yearbook: Odyssey
- School fees: $30
- Website: pah.ocsb.ca

St. Paul High School is a Catholic high school in Ottawa, Ontario, Canada.

== History ==
The school originally opened in 1978 under the name Bells Corners Senior Elementary School. It was located at 411 Seyton Drive in the Bells Corners neighbourhood in the city of Nepean, Ontario. Delays in construction meant that the school was late in opening, students were not able to move in until October. Students spent the first month attending classes at their old schools. The school community asked that the school be renamed after Saint Paul, and the name was changed within the first year.

At first, it was a junior high school only, but after several years of renovations and adding more grades one by one each year, it finally opened as a full high school serving grades 7 through OAC in September 1987.

The following school year, 1988–1989, the school underwent another construction project. The portables were moved into the parking lot, leaving an empty space closer to the building. During the course of the year, a new ten classroom building was constructed, called the portapak. Construction finished around May 1989 and some classes were moved in from the portables.

At the beginning of the 1989-1990 school year, four more portables arrived, bringing the total (including the ten rooms in the portapak) to almost thirty. That year, construction took place on Holy Trinity High School in nearby Kanata. Holy Trinity was being built with the intention of reducing the level of overcrowding at St. Paul's.

Although Holy Trinity was supposed to open in time for the 1990 school year, a strike of construction workers put the school behind schedule, and it was not ready when school began. The solution was to have the building on Seyton Drive serve as both schools temporarily. Students attending St. Paul's went in the morning, starting classes an hour earlier than usual, and finished at noon. Students attending Holy Trinity attended during the afternoon. That continued for two months, until Holy Trinity was finally ready to open at the beginning of November.

At some point in the early 1990s, the name of the school was changed from St Paul's to St. Paul. Items around the school, including the sign over the main entrance, were altered to reflect this change.

In 1999, the school board made a surprise move by selling the building on Seyton Drive while purchasing the former John A. Macdonald school, which was being used by Champlain Elementary School and Collège catholique Franco-Ouest, of the French Catholic School Board. The new location would be located on Draper Avenue in the neighbourhood of Pinecrest, a few kilometres to the east. That was done without consulting or notifying the students of St Paul or their parents, and it caused a great deal of concern and even anger because it meant students would be travelling longer distances to get to school and also because the building was in need of many renovations. The school has since undergone many extensive renovations with the Ottawa-Carleton Catholic School Board investing five million dollars to refurbish the facility and to bring it up to current standards. It has two gymnasia with hardwood floors, a university-style lecture hall, a cafeteria, new science and tech labs and an auditorium that can hold 750 spectators, ideal for both school and Board-wide performing arts initiatives.

The old building on Seyton Drive became Franco-Ouest, and has since undergone further expansion, with a new wing filling the courtyard that used to lie between the cafeteria and the industrial arts workshops.

== School life ==
The school mascot is a bear. Sports teams at St. Paul were originally known as the St. Paul Bears, but in the early 1990s that name gradually transitioned into the Golden Bears, a name which continues to exist today.

St. Paul has become well known for its arts productions, most notable of which is the major dramatic performance which takes place towards the end of each year, and usually requires the majority of the school year before that to prepare. Performances over the years have included You're A Good Man, Charlie Brown, 1873: The Farmer's Revolt, Beaver Tales, Anne of Green Gables, Jitters, Dracula: The Musical?!, But Why Bump Off Barnaby, Little Shop Of Horrors, The Legend of Sleepy Hollow and many more. Recently, the school performed a Canadian play, "Unity 1918", capturing the post-war Spanish Flu epidemic in Western Canada. The production won awards for Comic Actress in a Play (Stephanie Fields) and Ensemble in a Play (Caleigh McEachern and Anne Charbonneau) at the 2005-2006 Cappies Awards. During the 2007-2008 year, the school put on a production of Annie Weisman's "Be Aggressive." The school's performance of Unity 1918, capturing the post-war Spanish Flu epidemic in Western Canada won awards for Comic Actress in a Play (Stephanie Fields) and Ensemble in a Play (Caleigh McEachern and Anne Charbonneau) at the 2005-2006 Cappies Awards. The school also received a cappies award in 2008-2009. For best ensemble (Hilary Smith, and Clancy Adami) the play they performed was Arsenic and Old Lace. Other credits include: Jeremy Sanders as Reverend Harper, Natalia Chiarlelli as Off. Klein and Skylor Cloutier as Mr. Witherspoon.

Starting in the early nineties, students at St. Paul started making trips to the Dominican Republic to provide help to people in need there. Starting in the 1994-1995 school year, it began as a yearly event. Approximately 10 students and 2 teachers spent months prior to the March departure learning Spanish, fund raising and getting prepared for the experience. In 1995, students started Casa Cafe, which was a fundraiser organized and operated by the students. The group would travel for two weeks, landing in Santo Domingo - the capital of the Dominican Republic, and then traveling to San Jose de Ocoa to work in the rural farmland. Some of the jobs worked on by students includes: building a school, building and painting homes, and working on an irrigation/water system. Students initially lived with families (prior to 1995), but it was considered safer for students and teachers to live as a group. Often the students and teachers would stay in a school or church. Following a week in the mountainous region of the Dominican Republic, the group would travel to Quisqueya where they spent time interacting with the church community and visited the bateyes (villages where the Haitian sugar cane workers live). The students also picked sugar cane and helped load it onto trucks. Over the years students have raised tens of thousands of dollars and have brought down medical and school supplies. Each year, upon their return, students would put on a multi-media presentation to show the St. Paul community the work that they have done.

== Notable alumni ==
- Sean O'Donnell, former National Hockey League player.
- Paul Byron, hockey player, Montreal Canadiens
- Alison Smyth, actor
- Robin Brûlé, actor
- Tim Tierney, Ottawa City Councillor - Beacon Hill-Cyrville
- Tyler Crapigna, football player, Saskatchewan Roughriders
- Shermar Cuba Paul, rapper, Night Lovell

== See also ==
- Education in Ontario
- List of secondary schools in Ontario
