= Alison Smyth =

Alison Smyth may refer to:

- Alison Smyth (actress)
- Alison Smyth (footballer)

== See also ==
- Allison Smith (disambiguation)
