= North Glengarry =

- Township (lower-tier)
- Township of North Glengarry
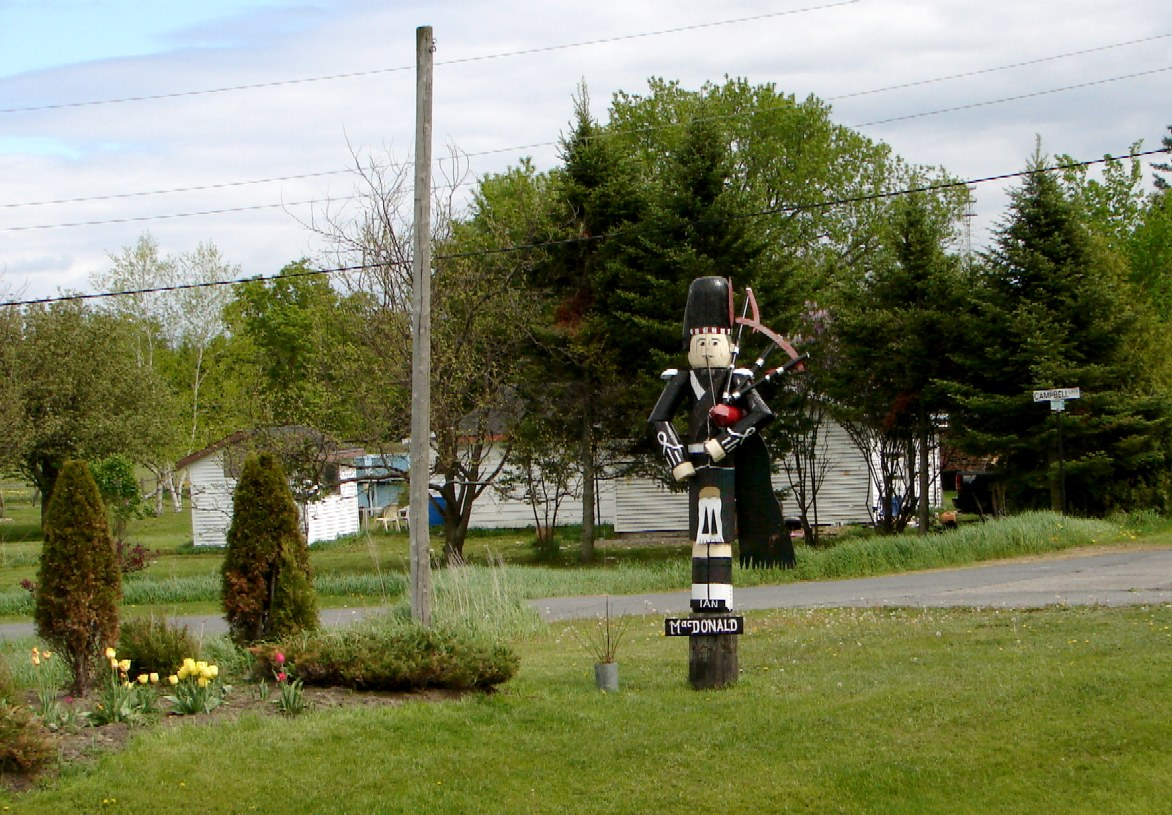
- Maxville

- Location within United Counties of Stormont, Dundas and Glengarry Location within Southern Ontario
- Coordinates: 45°20′N 74°44′W
- Country: Canada
- Province: Ontario
- County: Stormont, Dundas and Glengarry
- Settled: 1792
- Incorporated: 1998

Government
  - Type: Township
  - Mayor: Jamie MacDonald
  - Federal riding: Stormont—Dundas—Glengarry
  - Prov. riding: Glengarry—Prescott—Russell

Area
  - Land: 643.40 km^{2} (248.42 sq mi)

Population (2021)
  - Total: 10,119
  - Density: 15.7/km^{2} (41/sq mi)
- Time zone: UTC−5 (EST)
  - Summer (DST): UTC−4 (EDT)
- Postal code FSA: K0C
- Area code: 613 343
- Website: www.northglengarry.ca

North Glengarry is a township in eastern Ontario, Canada, in the United Counties of Stormont, Dundas and Glengarry. It is a predominantly rural area located between Ottawa-Gatineau, Montreal and Cornwall.

== Communities ==
The township of North Glengarry comprises a number of villages and hamlets, including the following communities:

- Kenyon Township: Apple Hill, Dominionville, Dunvegan, Greenfield, Maxville; Athol, Baltic Corners, Dornie, Fiskes Corners, Fassifern, Guaytown, Laggan, McCrimmon, St. Elmo, Stewarts Glen; Fairview, Skye
- Lochiel Township: Alexandria (population 3,287), Dalkeith, Glen Robertson, Glen Sandfield, Lochiel; Breadalbane, Brodie, Kirkhill, Lochinvar, Lorne, McCormick, Pine Grove

The township administrative offices are located in Alexandria.

Alexandria is served five or six times a day by the Montreal-Ottawa Via Rail trains which almost all stop at Alexandria station in each direction. Commuter buses provide daily services from Maxville and area to Ottawa-Gatineau. Maxville was served by Via Rail until October 2011.

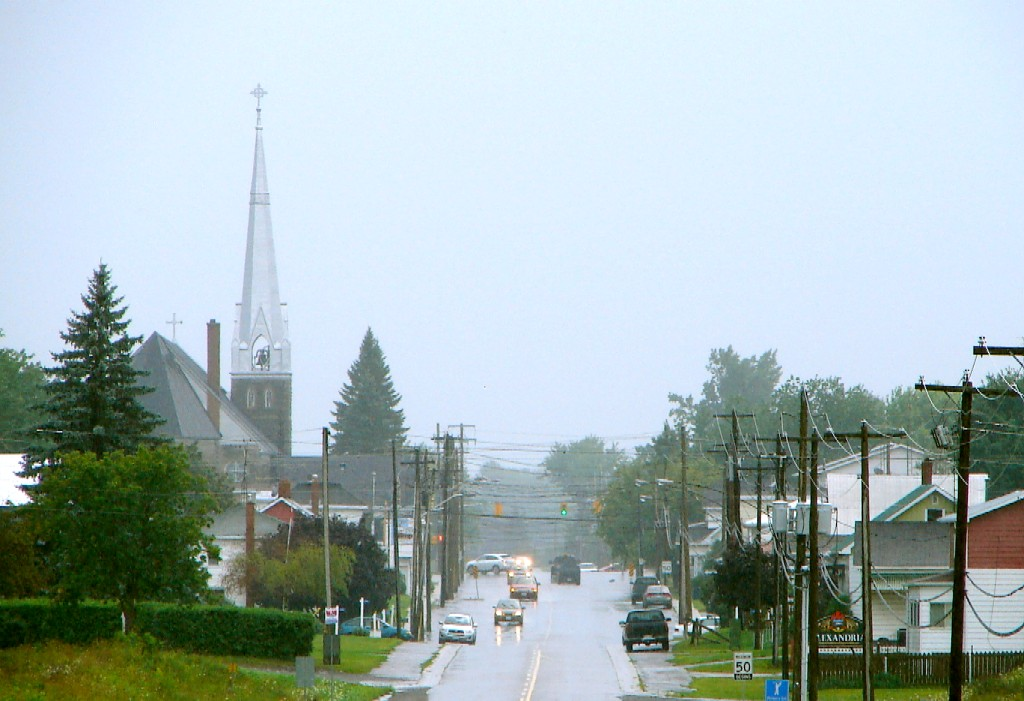
Alexandria

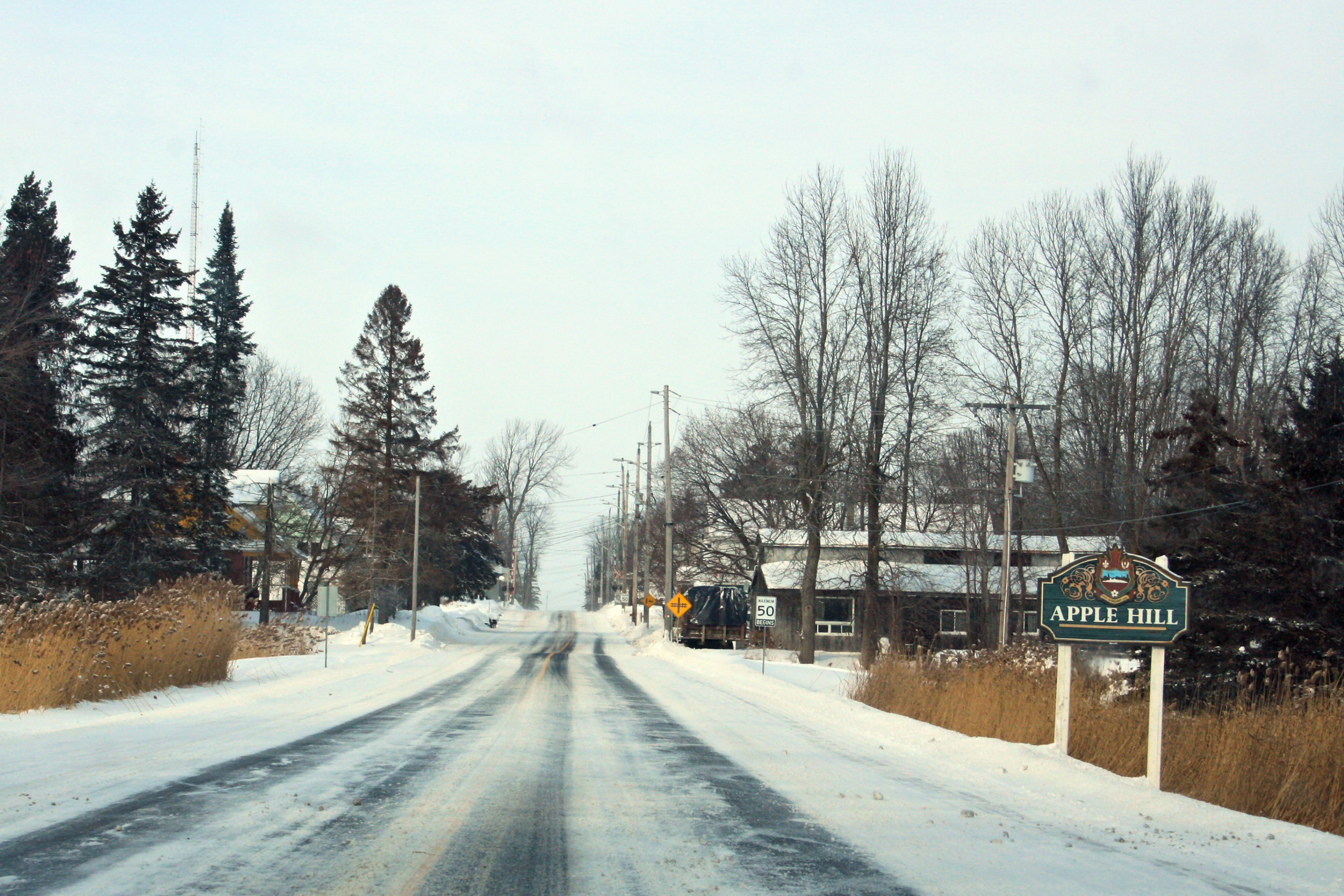
Apple Hill

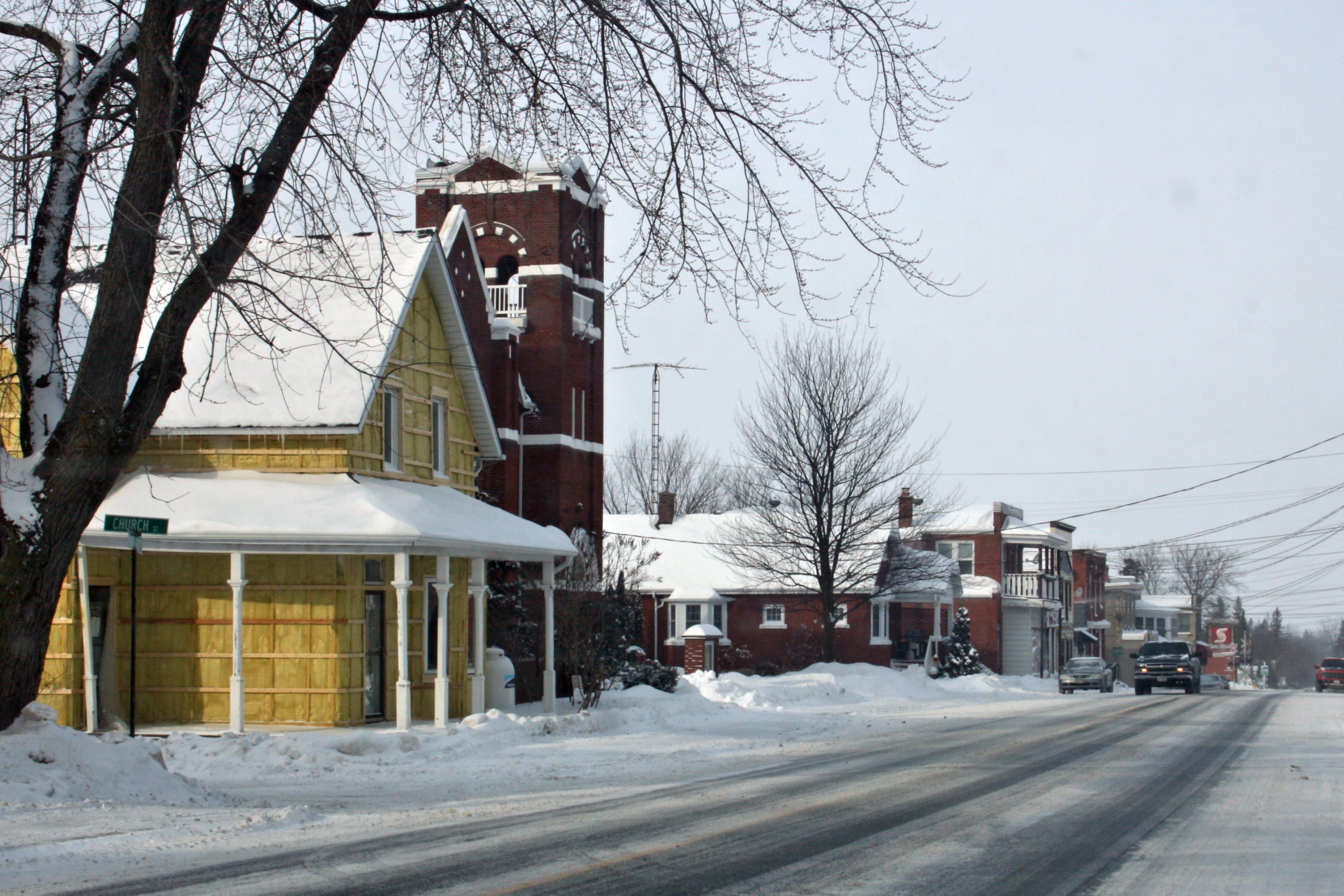
Maxville

== History ==
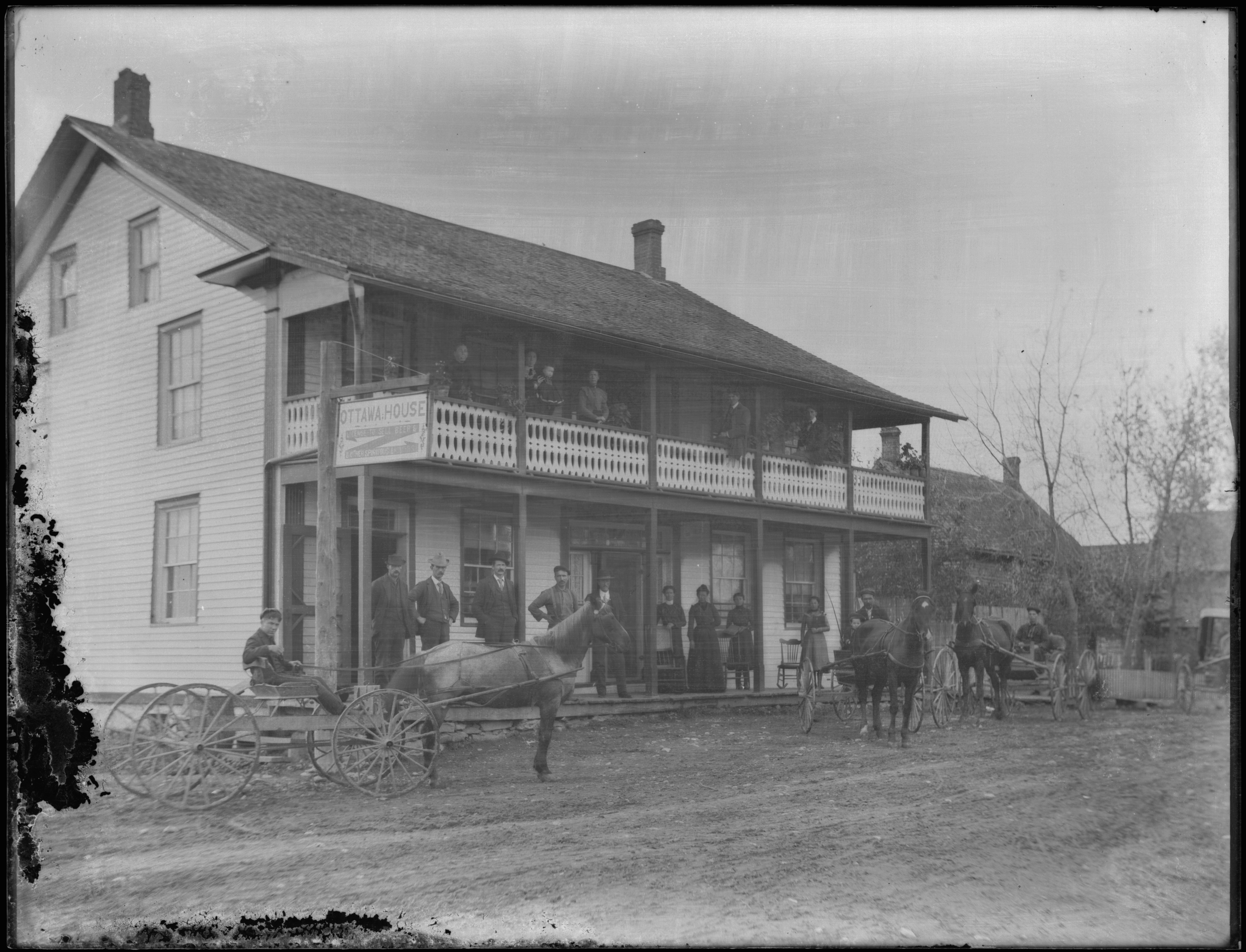
Ottawa House - hotel in Alexandria, Glengarry County, corner of Main and St. Paul Streets, between 1895 and 1910

The area was originally settled in 1792 as part of the historic Glengarry County in which many Scottish emigrants settled from all over the Scottish Highlands due to the Highland Clearances. This first wave of heavy migration lasted till 1816, emigration still continued afterwards into the early 20th century but in a slower pace. Many of these migrants came from the Inverness-shire area of Scotland specifically. Canadian Gaelic / Scottish Gaelic has been a spoken language in the area for over four centuries [1792?]. Kenyon, which was part of Charlottenburgh Township until 1798, was named for British judge and politician Lloyd Kenyon, 1st Baron Kenyon, and Lochiel, which was part of Lancaster Township until 1818, was named for the Lochiels of Clan Cameron.

Alexandria and its nucleus Priest's Mill, built in 1819, were named for the Catholic priest Alexander Macdonell, who resided at St. Raphael's and later became the first bishop of Kingston.

Development in the region was significantly spurred by the development of a railway link between Ottawa and Montreal in the early 1880s. Maxville, Alexandria and Glen Robertson, in particular, became key railway hubs for farmers in the area.

Maxville was first incorporated as a village separate from Kenyon Township in 1892, and Alexandria was separated from Lochiel Township in the early 1900s.

The township of North Glengarry was established on January 1, 1998, with the amalgamation of the former townships of Kenyon and Lochiel, along with the village of Maxville and the town of Alexandria.

== Demographics ==
In the 2021 Census of Population conducted by Statistics Canada, North Glengarry had a population of 10,144 living in 4,422 of its 4,714 total private dwellings, a change of 0.3% from its 2016 population of 10,109. With a land area of 643.4 km^{2} (248.4 sq mi), it had a population density of 15.8/km^{2} (40.8/sq mi) in 2021.

Canada census – North Glengarry community profile

	2021	2016	2011
Population	10,119 (+0.1% from 2016)	10,109 (-1.4% from 2011)	10,251 (-3.6% from 2006)
Land area	643.40 km^{2} (248.42 sq mi)	643.46 km^{2} (248.44 sq mi)	643.69 km^{2} (248.53 sq mi)
Population density	15.7/km^{2} (41/sq mi)	15.7/km^{2} (41/sq mi)	15.9/km^{2} (41/sq mi)
Median age	51.6 (M: 50.4, F: 52.4)	50.5 (M: 50.0, F: 50.9)	47.2 (M: 46.6, F: 47.8)
Private dwellings	4,701 (total) 4,409 (occupied)	4,658 (total)	4,610 (total)
Median household income	$71,000	$71,605

Notes: 2021 data based on revised population and dwelling counts.
References: 2021 2016 2011

Historical census populations

Year	Pop.	±%
1986	10,041	—
1991	10,675	+6.3%
1996	10,801	+1.2%
2001	10,589	−2.0%

Year	Pop.	±%
2006	10,635	+0.4%
2011	10,251	−3.6%
2016	10,109	−1.4%
2021	10,119	+0.1%

2021 population figure based on revised count. Population amounts prior to 2001 is total of Kenyon TP, Lochiel TP, Maxville VL, and Alexandria T.
Source: Statistics Canada

Mother tongue (2021):

- English as first language: 56.8 %
- French as first language: 34.9 %
- English and French as first languages: 3.4 %
- Other as first language: 4.3 %

== Culture ==
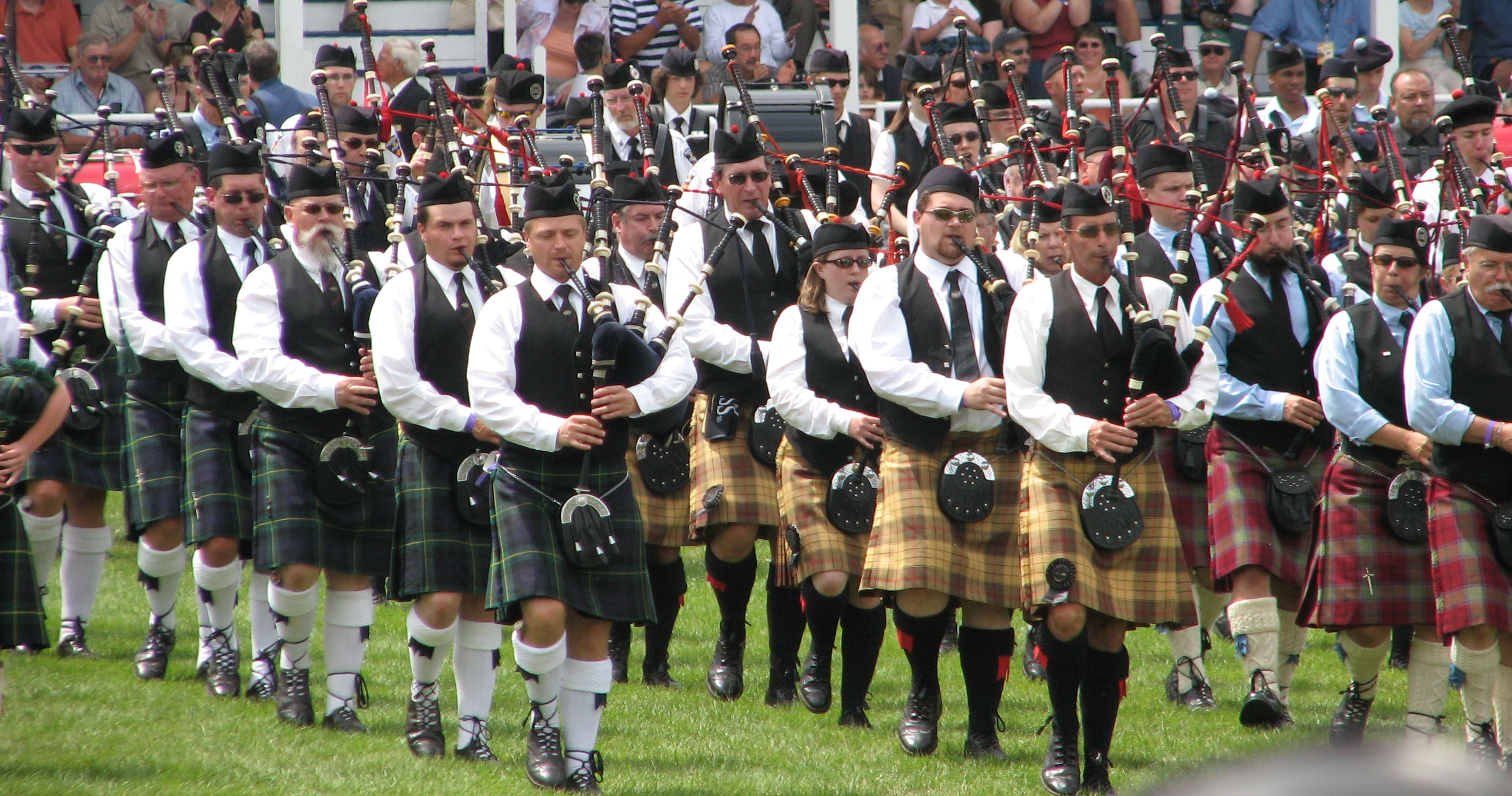
Massed bands at the Glengarry Highland Games

Maxville (population 853) hosts the annual Glengarry Highland Games, one of North America's largest festivals of Scottish culture, on the first long weekend in August. The Glengarry Highland Games include traditional Scottish events such as the caber toss, tug of war, and the sheaf toss.

Maxville hosts a country fair at the end of June that include a classic and new automobile show, homecraft prizes, Western performances, a holstein show including 4-H showmanship, a hunter horse and hunter pony show, a talent show, a midway, laser tag and a demolition derby.

== Sport ==
The Alexandria Glens of the Central Canada Hockey League Tier 2 play at the Glengarry Sports Palace (Billy Gebbie Arena) in Alexandria. The Glens joined the new CCHL2 league in 2015. The Glens played in the Eastern Ontario Junior B Hockey League until the 2014-15 season.

The Glens won the 2007 EOJBHL Championship, defeating the Gatineau Mustangs in 7 games in the final. This marks the first time a team outside of the Metro Division of EOJBHL has won the Carson Trophy as league champions in over half a decade. This marks the Glens' first Junior "B" Championship.

The Glens won the 2008 EOJBHL Championship, defeating the Ottawa West Golden Knights in 6 games in the final. This marks the first time a team the St-Lawrence Division has won the Carson Trophy back to back as league champions. This was also the Glens' second Junior "B" Championship.

The Maxville Mustangs of the Eastern Ontario Junior C Hockey League used to play in Maxville.

== See also ==
- Transit Eastern Ontario operated under the authority of The North Glengarry Prescott Russell (NGPR) Transport Board
- List of townships in Ontario
- List of francophone communities in Ontario
- Glengarry Pioneer Museum
- Canadian Gaelic
