= All Saints Catholic High School (Ottawa) =

Coordinates: 45.321629°N 75.925178°W

Location
- 5115 Kanata Avenue (Kanata North); Ottawa, Ontario, K2K 3K5; Canada

Information
- School type: Roman Catholic Secondary School
- Motto: "Dei Gratia"
- Religious affiliation: Catholic
- Founded: September 2002
- School board: Ottawa Catholic School Board
- Superintendent: Tim Slack
- Area trustee: Sandra Moore
- School number: 724777
- Principal: Jean-Paul Cloutier
- Grades: 7–12
- Enrollment: ~1700
- Language: English
- Colors: Silver, Blue, White and Burgundy
- Mascot: "Eddie the Yeti"
- Team name: Avalanche
- Rival: Holy Trinity High School
- Website: ash.ocsb.ca

All Saints Catholic High School, opened September 2002, is a secondary school in the Kanata district of Ottawa, Ontario. The school is located in the Kanata Lakes area of Kanata North and serves the communities of Kanata and West Carleton. The school motto is Dei Gratia, Latin for 'The Grace of God'. In 2005, All Saints students chose "Eddie the Yeti" as the school mascot.

== History ==
The school opened on September 3, 2002, with Monsignor Leonard Lunney presiding at the official ceremony on behalf of Archbishop Marcel Gervais. The school was built on land which was previously owned by the Whalen family.

The high school was designed in 2002 by architect Edward Cuhaci. A similar design was used for Holy Trinity Catholic High School, however All Saints increased the number of classrooms on the second floor.

The school's first year of operation only saw classes from Grade 7 up to and including Grade 11 because they did not want to split up Grade 12 classes in their graduating year. In order to prevent over-crowding, the school capped the maximum number of students permitted to attend in the first year. All Saints High School's second year of operation saw classes ranging all the way to grade 12, with population limits beginning to max out.

In 2002, All Saints High School adopted St. Elizabeth School in Ottawa as its sister school and has supported it by providing the elementary school with over 4,500 books for its literacy program.

In June 2004, the school's first graduation ceremony took place. The class of 2004 built a rock cairn entitled "Cairn of Hope" at the front of the school, into which a time capsule was placed.

In its fifth year of operation, All Saints High School installed multiple portables in order to increase the maximum number of students that can be educated at the school, which would later be replaced by the expansion. An expansion to the school, adding a new wing with 30 rooms, was completed in September 2007.

== Attendance Boundary ==
In the 2025/26 academic year, All Saints serves two distinct school zones for the Catholic board: the All Saints HS area ("Area 1"), and the Fernbank Temporary Accommodation Area ("Area 2"). Area 1 is broadly drawn as being South of the Ottawa River and Herzberg Road, West of Highway 7 and Campeau Drive, North of Golden Line Road and 12th Concession South, and East of the Mississippi River. Area 2 is outlined by Hazeldean Road, Eagleson Road, Fallowfield Road, and Shea Road into Iber Road.

There are seven OCSB elementary schools whose students are de facto enrolled with All Saints upon entering the 7th grade: Georges Vanier in Beaverbrook, St Gabriel in Kanata Lakes, St Isabel in Kanata North, St Isidore in Kanata, St Michael Corkery in Carp, St Martin de Porres in Kanata, and St Bernadette in Stittsville. The school also receives students from St Michael Fitzroy in Fitzroy Harbour, however those students transfer in grade 9 instead, as MIF is a K-8 institution.

== Specialist High Skills Majors ==
A Specialist High Skills Major (SHSM) Program is a supplementary certification program that students in Ontario may complete alongside their standard Ontario Secondary School Diploma (OSSD). The program is designed to help students better conceptualize and evaluate potential career trajectories through co-operative education, sector certifications, skills training, and more. Of the nineteen industry SHSMs offered across the province, twelve are available through the Ottawa Catholic School Board. Presently, All Saints is accredited to host four SHSM programs: Arts and Culture, Health and Wellness, Information & Communications Technology, and Manufacturing.

== Sports ==
All Saints has much success in sports such as baseball, curling, cross-country, soccer, and Track & Field. In 2011 the varsity boys baseball team won the city championship. In 2008, the senior boys basketball team participated in the Bedford Road Invitational Tournament, where they won the coveted Sportsmanship Award. The 7/8 girls soccer team has won the city championships two years in a row, once in 2008 and again in 2009. In 2016, the Senior Boys Basketball Team won the tier 1 city championship against AY Jackson. In 2022, the Senior Boys Soccer Team won the tier city championship against Lisgar Collegiate Institute.

All Saints teacher Tom ("Vanilla Thunder") Kennedy is an inductee into the StFX Sports Hall of Fame for his contribution to the CIS winning 1999–2000 X-Men basketball team.

== Notable alumni ==
- Chris Bumstead — six-time Mr. Olympia Classic Physique Champion
- Calvin de Haan — professional ice hockey defenceman
- Cole Beaudoin - NHL Player

== See also ==
- Ottawa Catholic School Board
- Education in Ontario
- List of secondary schools in Ontario
