= Billy Gebbie Arena =

Coordinates: 45.3127°N 74.6454°W

- "Glengarry Sports Palace"
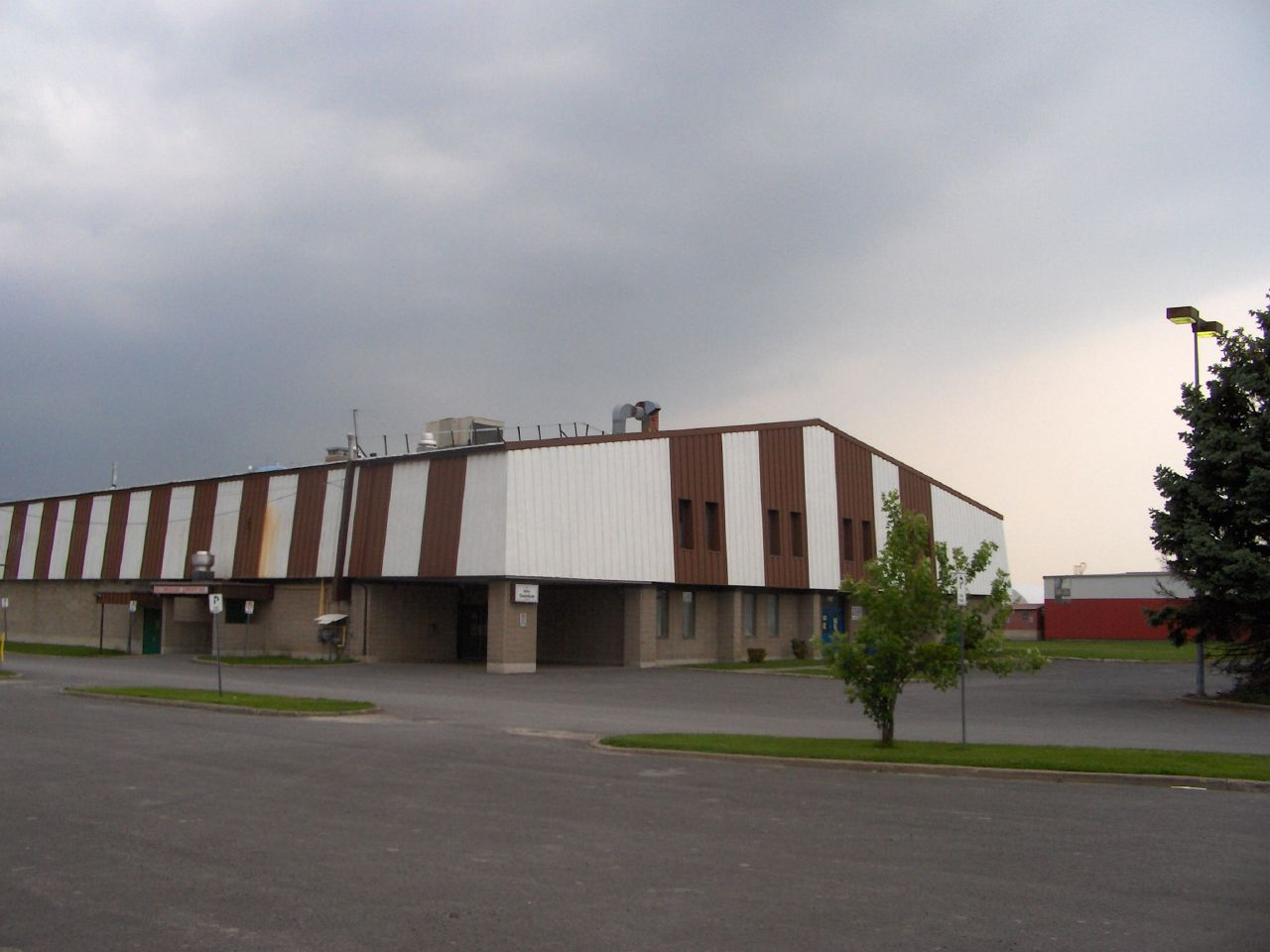
- Interactive map of Billy Gebbie Arena
- Location: 170 MacDonald Boulevard; Alexandria, Ontario, Canada
- Owner: Township of North Glengarry
- Capacity: 500+ Hockey
- Surface: 200' X 85'

Construction
- Opened: 1976

Tenants
- Alexandria Glens (CCHL2) (1976-present); Alexandria & District Minor Hockey Association (1976-present); Glengarry Girls Hockey Association (-present) Alexandria Ladies Ball Hockey League (-present)

The Billy Gebbie Arena, occupies a portion of the Glengarry Sports Palace (which also includes a branch of the SD&G County Library, a community hall, two baseball diamonds, and a soccer field), has been the home of the Alexandria Glens since 1976. The arena is also home for the Alexandria & District Minor Hockey Association, Glengarry Girls Hockey Association, and the Alexandria Ladies Ball Hockey League. It is located in Alexandria, Ontario, and has a capacity of 500+ for hockey games.

When the ice is out (typically from April through August), the arena floor hosts a number of events, including the Alexandria & District Chamber of Commerce Trade Show and once every three years the Glengarry Sports Hall of Fame induction dinner/ceremony. The community hall attached to the rink is rented throughout the year for numerous events, public and private.

== Events ==
The final games of the 7-game 2007 EOJBHL championship series were held at the Billy Gebbie Arena, where the Glens won game 7, defeating Gatineau Mustangs 4-0 and won the series 4 games to 3. The arena also host the Annual Little Nashville Tabc Jr. Country Festival and the 1st Annual Rideau-St. Lawrence Showcase for the Alexandria Glens in 2008. The Alexandria Jr.B Glens will be hosting the EOJHL Fall Classic on October 17, 18 and 19, 2013.

The public address announcer for the Alexandria Glens games is Paul Lalonde.

== Tenants ==
- Alexandria Glens (CCHL2)
  (1976–present)
- Alexandria Minor Hockey Association (ODMHA)
  (1976–present)
- Glengarry Girls Hockey Association
  (-present)
- Alexandria Figure Skating Club
  (1976–2010)

== Championships ==
- 1984 EOJCHL Champions
- 2006-2007 EOJBHL Branch Champions
- 2007 Boxing Day Tournaments Champions
- 2007-2008 EOJBHL Branch Champions

== Retired jerseys ==
The following numbers are retired by the Alexandria Jr.B Glens and hang from the rafters:

- 4 Marc Ménard
- 3 Brian Filion
