= Glengarry Brigade =

Canadian junior ice hockey team

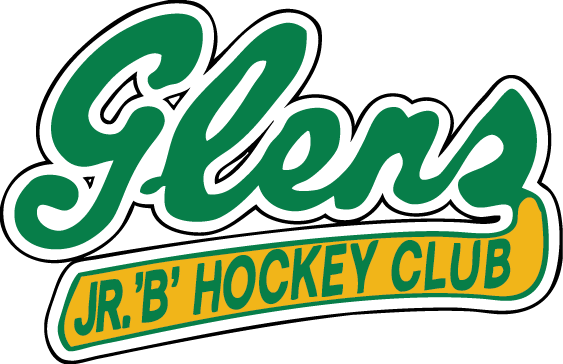
- City: South Glengarry, Ontario, Canada
- League: Eastern Ontario Junior Hockey League
- Division: Martin
- Founded: 1967
- Home arena: Glengarry Sports Palace & Char-Lan Rec Centre (2024- present)Billy Gebbie Arena (1976-2021, 2022-2024); Maxville & District Sports Complex (2021-2022)
- Colours: Green, Blue, and White
- Owner: Community Owned
- General manager: (Canada) Grant Cooper (2024 - present)
- Head coach: (Canada) Grant Cooper (2024 - present)
- Captain: (Canada) Donovan Francis

Franchise history
- 1967–2024: Alexandria Glens
- 2024–Present: Glengarry Brigade

The Glengarry Brigade are a Canadian junior ice hockey team based in Glengarry County, Ontario, Canada. They are members of the Martin Division of the Eastern Ontario Junior Hockey League (EOJHL). They play at the Glengarry Sports Palace & Char-Lan Rec Centre. In their history, the Glens have won the D. Arnold Carson Memorial Trophy or now named the Dwayne Barkley trophy twice as district Junior "B" champions and the Rebels have won it once.

== History ==
The Glens were formed in 1967.

In 2007, the Glens won the D. Arnold Carson Memorial Trophy as Eastern Ontario Junior "B" champions, defeating the Gatineau Mustangs 4-games-to-3 in the league final. This marks the first time a team outside of the Metro Division of EOJBHL has won the Carson Trophy as league champions in over half a decade. The Glens won the championship for the first that year, their Forty year of existence.

In 2008, the Glens won the D. Arnold Carson Memorial Trophy for the second time and won it back to back, defeating the Ottawa West Golden Knights 4-games-to-2 in the league final. The Glens were the first team in Rideau/St-Lawrence Conference to win a back to back championship.

The Glens have an intense rivalry with the Char-Lan Rebels. The rivalry has been touted as "The Battle of Glengarry" within the local community. Games between the teams are often heated events.

On April 21, 2015, The Hawkesbury Hawks (CCHL) & Alexandria Glens (CCHL2) have become affiliates.

In 2024 the Glens and the Char-Lan Rebels merges and became the Glengarry Brigade.

- 1971: St-Lawrence Division Champions
- 1974: North-East Division Champions
- 1984: Eastern Ontario Junior C Hockey League Champions
- 1988: St-Lawrence Division Champions
- 1988: Rideau/St-Lawrence Conference Champions
- 1990: St-Lawrence Division Champions
- 1990: Rideau/St-Lawrence Conference Champions
- 1991: St-Lawrence Division Champions
- 1998: St-Lawrence Division Champions
- 2002: Boxing Day Tournaments Champions
- 2003: St-Lawrence Division Champions
- 2004: St-Lawrence Division Champions
- 2004: Rideau/St-Lawrence Conference Champions
- 2005: St-Lawrence Division Champions
- 2005: Rideau/St-Lawrence Conference Champions
- 2007: St-Lawrence Division Champions
- 2007: Rideau/St-Lawrence Conference Champions
- 2007: EOJBHL Carson Trophy Champions
- 2007: Boxing Day Tournaments Champions
- 2008: Glens host 1st annual Rideau/St-Lawrence Conference Showcase
- 2008: St-Lawrence Division Champions
- 2008: Rideau/St-Lawrence Conference Champions
- 2008: EOJBHL Carson Trophy Champions
- 2009: St-Lawrence Division Champions
- 2009: Rideau/St-Lawrence Conference Champions
- 2010: St-Lawrence Division Champions
- 2010: Rideau/St-Lawrence Conference Champions
- 2015: Joins Central Canada Hockey League Tier 2 League

== Season-by-season results ==
Season	GP	W	L	T	OTL	GF	GA	PTS	Results	Playoffs
1981-82	35	16	16	3	-	193	202	35	3rd EO-NWest	
1982-83	36	10	21	5	-	193	224	25	6th EO-AEng	
1983-85	Statistics Not Available									
1985-86	37	12	24	1	-	179	268	25	6th EO-AEng	
1986-87	40	10	27	3	-	202	305	23	4th EO-AEng	
1987-99	Statistics Not Available									
1999-00	45	19	24	2	-	176	294	42	5th EO StLawr	
2000-01	45	27	17	1	-	192	169	55	2nd EO StLawr	
2001-02	45	28	14	3	-	194	164	59	2nd EO StLawr	
2002-03	45	25	15	3	2	211	183	55	1st EO StLawr	Lost Conference
2003-04	45	32	8	3	2	223	156	69	1st EO StLawr	Lost Final
2004-05	45	28	15	0	2	175	153	58	2nd EO StLawr	Lost Final
2005-06	45	30	11	3	1	248	163	64	2nd EO StLawr	Lost Division Final
2006-07	40	30	5	3	2	263	145	65	1st EO StLawr	Won League
2007-08	42	31	10	0	1	246	139	63	1st EO StLawr	Won League
2008-09	42	31	9	1	1	272	148	64	1st EO StLawr	Lost Final
2009-10	40	23	12	4	1	213	148	51	2nd EO StLawr	Lost Final
2010-11	42	29	9	0	4	195	142	62	2nd EO StLawr	Lost Div. Semi Final
2011-12	42	25	16	0	1	194	151	51	3rd EO StLawr	Lost Div. Semi-final
2012-13	41	16	23	0	2	144	185	34	5th EO StLawr	DNQ
Season	GP	W	L	OTL	SOL	GF	GA	PTS	Results	Playoffs
2013-14	41	19	16	5	1	169	189	44	5th EO StLawr	DNQ
2014-15	40	23	14	0	3	179	171	49	2nd EO StLawr	Lost Div. Semi-final, 2-4 (Hawks)
2015-16	44	24	16	3	1	209	164	52	4 of 8 Martin Div; 7th of 16 CCHL2	Won Wild Card (2-1) (Hawks); Lost Quarterfinals (0-4) (Vikings)
2016-17	48	18	28	1	1	168	197	38	6 of 8 Martin Div; 11th of 16 CCHL2	Did not qualify
2017-18	52	31	16	2	3	201	166	67	3 of 8 Martin Div; 5th of 16 CCHL2	Lost Div. Semi-final, 2-4 (Jr. Canadians)
2018-19	44	23	17	2	2	169	160	50	4 of 8 Martin Div; 8th of 16 CCHL2	Lost Play in, 1-2 (Rebels)
2019-20	44	9	31	3	1	132	199	22	8 of 8 Martin Div; 15th of 16 CCHL2	Did not qualify
2020-21	Season lost to covid									
2021-22	44	14	26	1	1	128	197	30	6 of 8 Martin Div; 13th of 16 EOJHL	Did not qualify
2022-23	42	5	36	0	1	89	242	11	8 of 8 Martin Div; 14th of 16 EOJHL	Did not qualify
2023-24	44	10	33	0	1	114	215	21	7 of Martin Div; 14th of 16 EOJHL	Did not qualify
GLENGARRY BRIGADE
2024-25	48	19	25	3	1	164	188	42	5th of 6 Martin; 11th of 13 EOJHL	Won Wild Card 3-2 (Panthers)
2025-26	44	15	24	3	2	111	163	35	6th of 6 Martin; 11th of 13 EOJHL	Did not qualify

=== Playoffs ===
- 2007 Won league

Alexandria Glens defeated Kemptville 73's 4-games-to-1 in division semi-final
Alexandria Glens defeated Morrisburg Lions 4-games-to-1 in division final
Alexandria Glens defeated Westport Rideaus 4-games-to-3 in conference final
Alexandria Glens defeated Gatineau Mustangs 4-games-to-3 in final

- 2008 Won league

Alexandria Glens defeated Morrisburg Lions 4-games-to-0 in division semi-final
Alexandria Glens defeated Winchester Hawks 4-games-to-1 in division final
Alexandria Glens defeated Athens Aeros 4-games-to-0 in conference final
Alexandria Glens defeated Ottawa West Golden Knights 4-games-to-2 in final

- 2009 Lost final

Alexandria Glens defeated Winchester Hawks 4-games-to-1 in division semi-final
Alexandria Glens defeated Char-Lan Rebels 4-games-to-2 in division final
Alexandria Glens defeated Gananoque Islanders 4-games-to-0 in conference final
Ottawa West Golden Knights defeated Alexandria Glens 4-games-to-0 in final

- 2010 Lost final

Alexandria Glens defeated Char-Lan Rebels 4-games-to-1 in division semi-final
Alexandria Glens defeated Casselman Vikings 4-games-to-1 in division final
Alexandria Glens defeated Athens Aeros 4-games-to-2 in conference final
Ottawa Jr. Canadians defeated Alexandria Glens 4-games-to-1 in final

- 2011 Lost division semi-final

Winchester Hawks defeated Alexandria Glens 4-games-to-none in division semi-final

- 2012 Lost division semi-final

Casselman Vikings defeated Alexandria Glens 4-games-to-none in division semi-final

=== Alexandria Glens - Leagues Finals and Championships ===
Year	Champion	Finalist	Results
EOJCHL Championship
1984	Alexandria Glens
EOJHL Carson Trophy Champions
1988	Renfrew Timberwolves	Alexandria Glens
1990	Renfrew Timberwolves	Alexandria Glens
2004	Metcalfe Jets	Alexandria Glens	4-3
2005	Ottawa West Golden Knights	Alexandria Glens	4-2
2007	Alexandria Glens	Gatineau Mustangs	4-3
2008	Alexandria Glens	Ottawa West Golden Knights	4-2
2009	Ottawa West Golden Knights	Alexandria Glens	4-0
2010	Ottawa Jr. Canadians	Alexandria Glens	4-1

reg_season_titles = 5 (2002–03), (2003–04), (2006–07), (2007–08), (2008–09)
division_titles = 13 1971, 1974, 1988, 1990, 1991, 1998, 2003, 2004, 2005, 2007, 2008, 2009, 2010
conf_titles = 8 1998, 1990, 2004, 2005, 2007, 2008, 2009, 2010
championships = 2 2007, 2008

== Honoured members ==
=== Retired numbers ===
The Glens have retired two number in honour of two players

No.	Player	Position	Tenure	Date of honour
3	Brian Filion
4	Marc Menard
