= Glengarry Pioneer Museum =

Coordinates: 45.3621°N 74.8175°W

The Glengarry Pioneer Museum was established in 1962 by the Glengarry Historical Society. In 2013, the Museum was incorporated as a non-profit organization, and was awarded charitable status later that year. It is located in the hamlet of Dunvegan, in the township of North Glengarry, Ontario, in the United Counties of Stormont, Dundas and Glengarry in Eastern Ontario. The Museum provides a look at the pioneer and Celtic history of eastern Ontario (Upper Canada) from before 1812 until the 1920s.

The museum features twelve 19th-century log or wood-frame buildings with historic artifacts. The buildings include a mid-19th-century period inn (the oldest still-functioning bar in Ontario), a functioning blacksmith shop, a livery shed with farming equipment, a cheese factory, a barn with sleighs, a barn with tools, a trapper's cabin and a schoolhouse. The former township hall building features several displays including a general store, a doctor's office, the roles of women in the household, the War of 1812 and other exhibits. An 1870s "Orange Lodge" houses a reception area, gift shop, displays, and offices. The most recent addition is an open-sided pavilion suitable for fairs, presentations, large parties and receptions.

The museum is open seasonally: daily in the summer; weekends spring and fall.
