= Ottawa Canadians =

Ottawa Jr. Canadians
- City: Ottawa, Ontario, Canada
- League: Eastern Ontario Junior Hockey League
- Division: Martin
- Founded: 1973
- Home arena: Earl Armstrong Arena
- Colours: Red, white, blue
- Owner: Tasso Vasilas
- General manager: Rob Gignac
- Head coach: Tasso Vasilas

Franchise history
- 1973-2007: South Ottawa Canadians
- 2007-Present: Ottawa Jr. Canadians

The Ottawa Jr. Canadians are a Canadian Junior ice hockey team from Ottawa, Ontario, Canada. They formerly played in the Eastern Ontario Junior Hockey League of the Ottawa District Hockey Association.

Between 2014-15 and the end of the 2019-2020 seasons, the EOJHL and the CCHL set a new agreement in an attempt to create a better player development model. This resulted in the league re-branding itself as the Central Canada Hockey League Tier 2 (CCHL2), and shrinking to 16 teams and two divisions. The league reverted to the Eastern Ontario Junior Hockey League for 2021. The Canadians are in the Martin Division.

== Season-by-season results ==
Season	GP	W	L	T	OTL	GF	GA	P	Results	Playoffs
1981-82	35	32	2	1	-	320	113	65	1st EO-NWest	Won League
1982-83	32	26	9	7	-	255	195	59	2nd EO-Valley	
1983-84	Statistics Not Available									
1984-85	36	23	12	1	-	227	187	47	3rd EO-Valley	
1985-86	36	30	4	2	-	276	151	62	1st EO-NWest	
1986-87	40	29	9	2	-	255	148	60	1st EO-Metro	
1987-99	Statistics Not Available									
1999-00	42	24	14	4	3	211	170	56	3rd EO Metro	Lost Division S-final
2000-01	42	26	15	4	2	186	147	58	3rd EO Metro	Lost Division Final
2001-02	40	23	17	0	1	183	151	47	3rd EO Metro	Lost Division S-final
2002-03	40	23	17	0	2	199	182	48	2nd EO Metro	Lost Division S-final
2003-04	40	24	15	1	2	214	157	51	1st EO Valley	Lost semi-final
2004-05	40	22	12	1	5	210	173	50	2nd EO Metro	Lost Division Final
2005-06	40	18	17	0	5	176	176	41	4th EO Metro	Lost Division S-final
2006-07	40	24	14	1	1	216	155	50	3rd EO Metro	Lost Division S-final
2007-08	39	26	10	2	1	199	137	55	3rd EO Metro	
2008-09	39	24	10	4	1	202	133	53	2nd EO Metro	
2009-10	44	29	14	0	1	206	169	59	2nd EO Metro	Won League
2010-11	42	25	14	2	1	150	125	53	3rd EO Metro	Lost Division S-Final
2011-12	42	11	25	3	3	149	196	28	5th EO Metro	DNQ
Season	GP	W	L	OTL	SOL	GF	GA	P	Results	Playoffs
2012-13	41	30	11	0	0	216	130	60	1st EO Metro	Won League
2013-14	41	25	12	1	3	162	131	54	2nd EO Metro	Lost Division Final
2014-15	40	17	19	1	3	131	150	38	5th EO Metro	DNQ

CCHL 2 2020-21 return to EOJHL
Season	GP	W	L	OTL	SOL	GF	GA	P	Results	Playoffs
2015-16	44	29	13	1	1	126	199	60	7th of 8 Martin Div; 13th of 16 EO Metro	DNQ
2016-17	48	15	24	4	1	151	198	35	7th of 8 Martin Div; 13th of 16 CCHL2	Did not qualify
2017-18	52	34	15	1	2	200	147	71	2nd of 8 Martin Div; 4th of 16 CCHL2	Won Div. Semifinal 4-2 (Glens); Lost Lea. Semifinals 3-4 (Jr. Canadians)
2018-19	44	39	4	1	0	256	85	79	1st of 8 Martin Div; 1st of 16 CCHL2	Won Div. Semifinal 4-0 (Rebels); Won Div. finals 4-3 (Vikings); Lost FINALS 1-4 (Blue Wings)
2019-20	44	29	9	4	2	182	117	64	2nd of 8 Martin Div; 2nd of 16 CCHL2	Incomplete Div. Semifinal 1-0 (Panthers) remaining playoffs cancelled covid-19
2020-21	Season lost to covid									
2021-22	46	16	26	0	0	110	164	32	6th of 8 Martin Div; 12th of 16 EOJHL	Won Div. Quarters 2-0 (Hawks); Lost div. semi-finals 1-3 (Golden Knights)
2022-23	42	21	16	1	4	128	127	47	5th of 8 Martin Div; 9th of 16 EOJHL	Won Div. Quarters 2-0 (Golden Knights); Lost div. semi-finals 1-4 (Royals)
2023-24	44	27	16	0	1	141	110	55	3rd of 7 Martin Div; 5th of 14 EOJHL	Won Div. Quarters 3-0 (Rebels); Lost div. semi-finals 0-4 (Golden Knights)
2024-25	48	31	12	3	2	202	145	67	2nd of 6 Martin Div; 2nd of 13 EOJHL	Won Div. Semifinals 4-1 (Golden Knights); Won Div Finals 4-3 (Vikings); Won League Finals 4-2 Jr. Canadians; Barkley Cup Champions
2025-26	44	31	12	0	1	190	123	63	3rd of 6 Martin Div; 4th of 13 EOJHL	Won Div. Semifinals 4-3 (Golden Knights); Lost Div Finals 1-4
