= Calvin de Haan =

Canadian ice hockey player (born 1991)

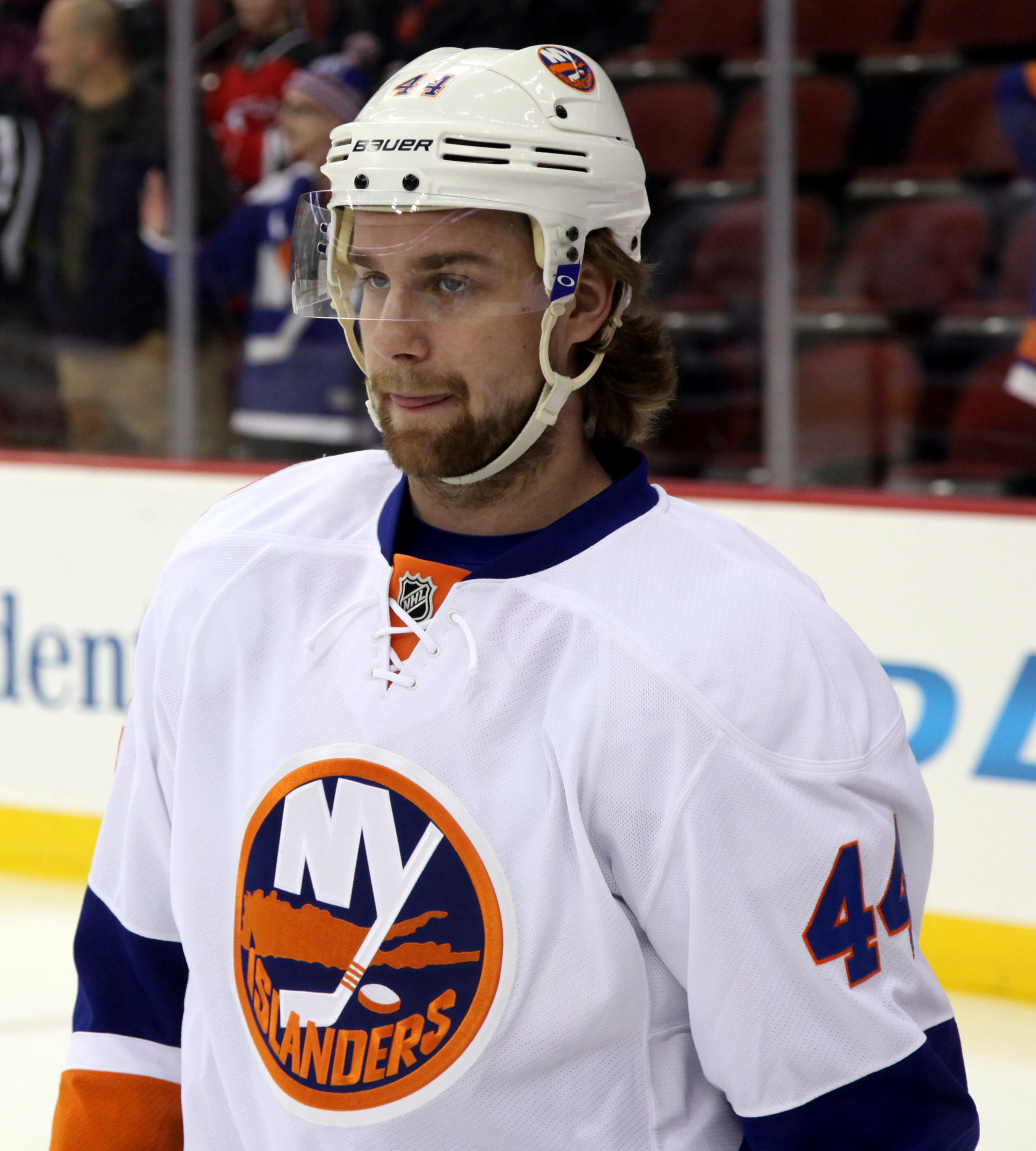
- De Haan with the New York Islanders in 2015
- Born: May 9, 1991 (age 35) Carp, Ontario, Canada
- Height: 6 ft 1 in (185 cm)
- Weight: 195 lb (88 kg; 13 st 13 lb)
- Position: Defence
- Shoots: Left
- SHL team Former teams: Rögle BK; New York Islanders; Carolina Hurricanes; Chicago Blackhawks; Tampa Bay Lightning; Colorado Avalanche; New York Rangers
- National team: Canada
- NHL draft: 12th overall, 2009; New York Islanders
- Playing career: 2011–present

Calvin de Haan (born May 9, 1991) is a Canadian professional ice hockey defenceman who is currently playing for Rögle BK of the Swedish Hockey League (SHL). de Haan was selected 12th overall by the New York Islanders at the 2009 NHL entry draft.

== Early life ==
de Haan was born and raised in Carp, Ontario with his younger brother Evan and parents Bill and Kathy. He attended Huntley Centennial Public School and All Saints Catholic High School growing up.

== Playing career ==
=== Amateur ===
de Haan was drafted by the Oshawa Generals of the Ontario Hockey League (OHL) in the third round, 50th overall, at the 2007 OHL Priority Selection. Prior to joining the Generals, he played one season with the Kemptville 73's of the Central Junior A Hockey League. He was named the Rookie of the Year in the 2007–08 season after scoring 42 points in 58 games. In his rookie season with the Generals in 2008–09, he finished second on the team in scoring with 63 points, scoring eight goals and adding 55 assists. The Generals named him their top rookie and top defenceman, while he was also selected to play in the OHL All-Star Game and the 2009 CHL Top Prospects Game.

Ranked 25th by the NHL Central Scouting Bureau heading into the 2009 NHL entry draft, de Haan expected to be a late first, or early second round, selection. He was eventually selected by the New York Islanders, who made a trade to acquire the 12th overall pick, which they used to draft him.

The following season, de Haan required surgery to repair a torn labrum in his shoulder and was ruled out for the rest of the season.

=== Professional ===
==== New York Islanders ====
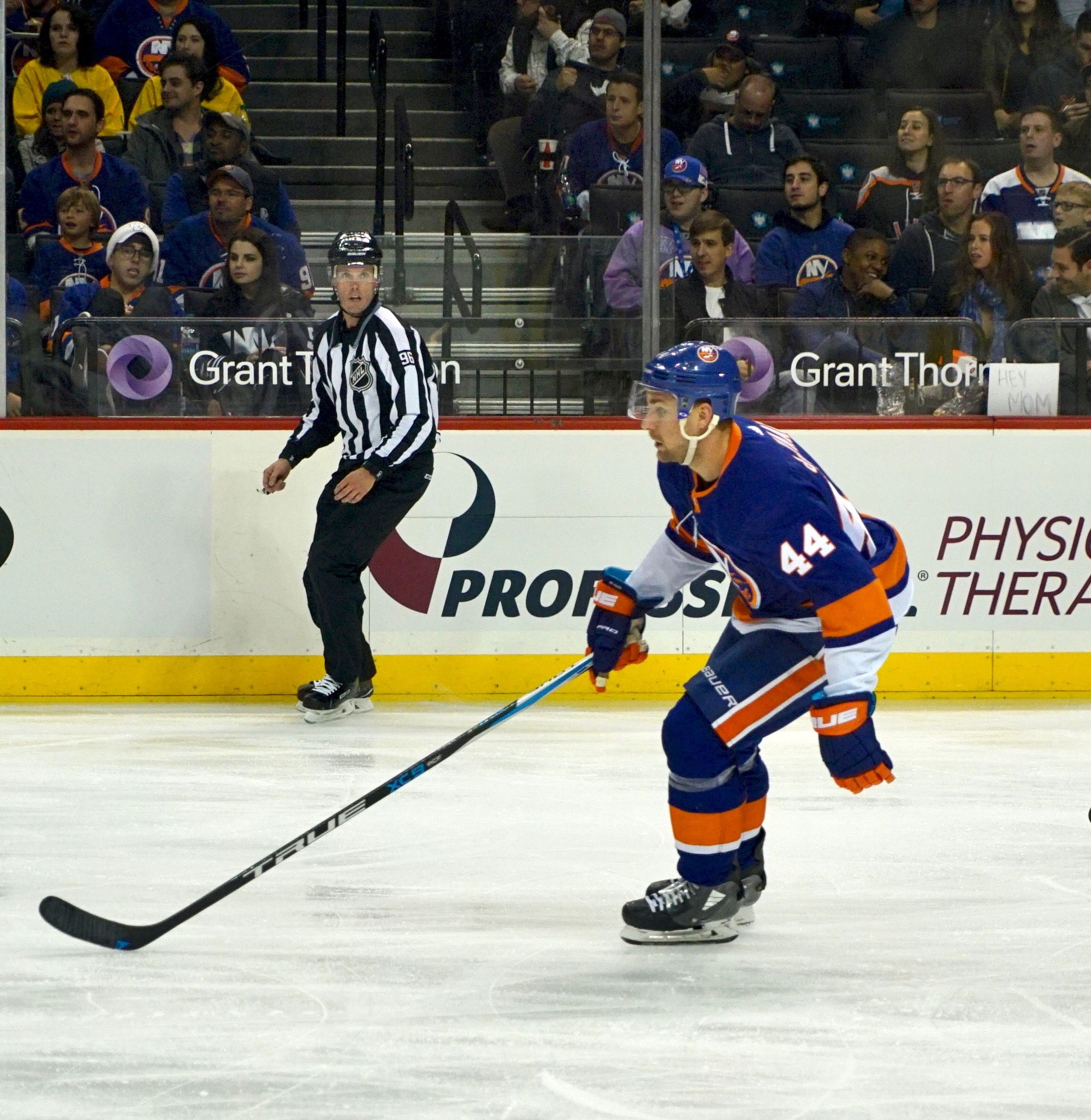
De Haan with the Islanders in 2017

de Haan turned professional during the 2011–12 season, appearing in 56 games for the Bridgeport Sound Tigers. de Haan made his NHL debut with the Islanders that season, on December 15 against the Dallas Stars. de Haan was sent back to the AHL following his debut and was named to the 2012 AHL All-Star Team.

While playing 17 games for the Sound Tigers during the 2013–14 season, de Haan also skated in 51 games for the Islanders, and scored his first career NHL goal against the Toronto Maple Leafs in a 5–3 victory on January 7. On July 15, 2014, the Islanders re-signed de Haan to a three-year, $5.9 million contract. de Haan became a regular on the Islanders blueline the following season, appearing in 65 games.

On August 2, 2017, the Islanders re-signed de Haan to a one-year, $3.3 million contract. The two sides were set for an arbitration meeting that afternoon, with the deal being completed in the morning. During the season, de Haan suffered a lower body injury in a game against the Los Angeles Kings and was ruled out indefinitely for the rest of the season. de Haan missed the rest of the 49 games recovering from the required surgery.

==== Carolina Hurricanes ====
On July 3, 2018, de Haan signed a four-year, $18.2 million contract with the Carolina Hurricanes. In his first season with the club in 2018–19, de Haan strengthened a dynamic Hurricanes blue line, adding 1 goal and 13 assists in 74 regular season games. Helping Carolina return to the post-season for the first time in 10 years, he appeared in a career high 12 playoff games in reaching the Eastern Conference Finals.

==== Chicago Blackhawks ====
On June 24, 2019, de Haan's tenure with the Hurricanes ended as he was traded along with Aleksi Saarela to the Chicago Blackhawks in exchange for Gustav Forsling and Anton Forsberg. However, he played a mere 29 games in the 2019–20 season before undergoing season-ending surgery on his right shoulder.

==== Return to Carolina ====
As a free agent at the conclusion of his contract with the Blackhawks, de Haan remained un-signed over the summer. Prior to the 2022–23 season, de Haan returned to the Hurricanes organization initially on a tryout basis before signing a one-year, $850,000 contract on October 2, 2022.

==== Tampa Bay Lightning ====
On July 2, 2023, de Haan signed a one-year, $775,000 contract as a free agent with his fourth NHL club, the Tampa Bay Lightning, for the 2023–24 season. In a third-pairing role with the Lightning, de Haan made 59 regular season appearances while contributing with 3 goals and 10 points. He featured in one post-season game ending his tenure with the club.

==== Colorado Avalanche ====
As a free agent at the conclusion of his contract with the Lightning, de Haan was signed on the opening day of free agency after agreeing to a one-year, $800,000 contract with the Colorado Avalanche on July 1, 2024.

==== New York Rangers ====
On March 1, 2025, the Avalanche traded de Haan, Juuso Pärssinen, and two conditional draft picks in 2025 to the New York Rangers, in exchange for Hank Kempf, Ryan Lindgren, and Jimmy Vesey.

== International play ==
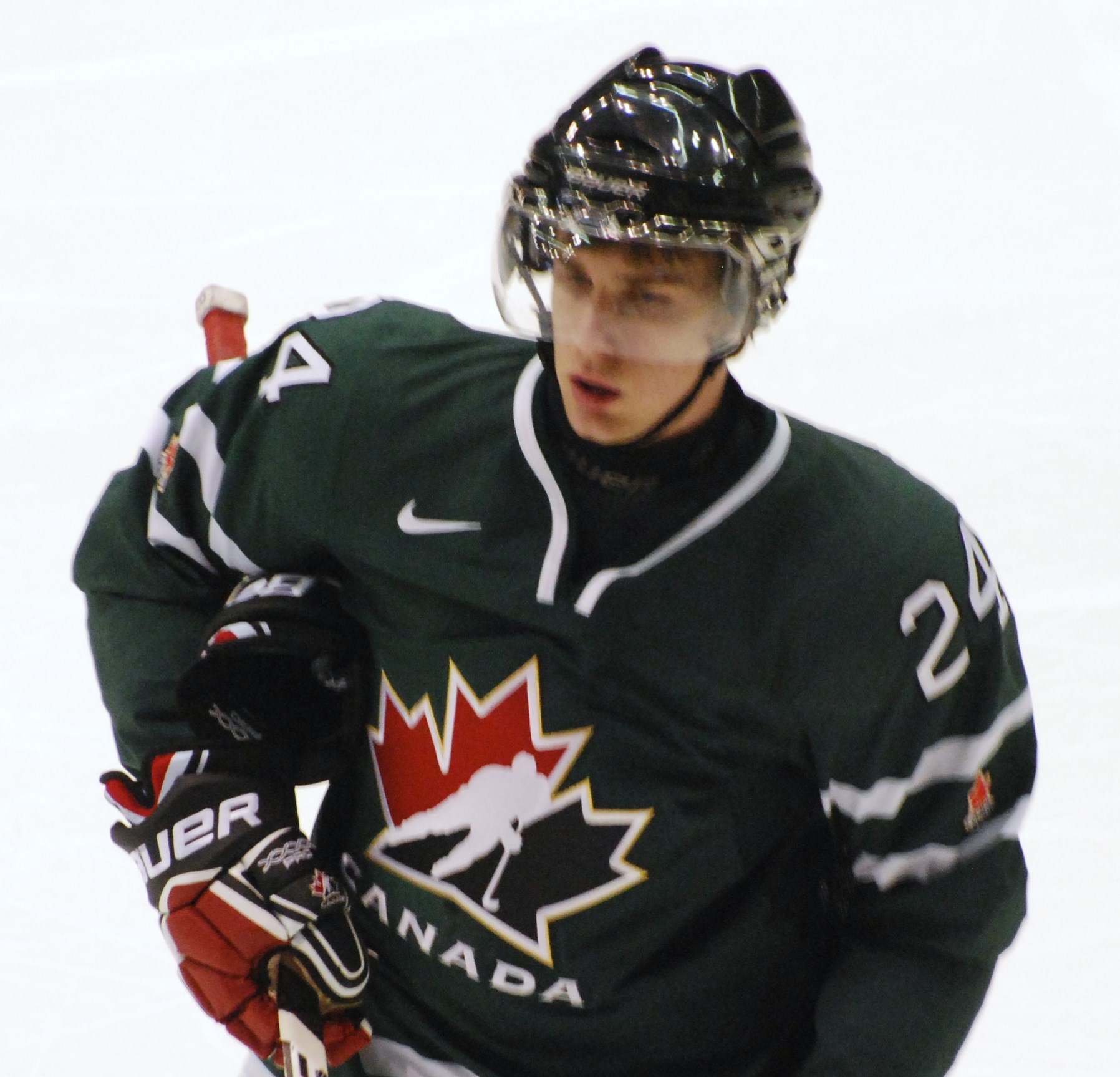
- de Haan in 2010

Medal record

Representing Canada

Ice hockey

World Championships
Silver medal – second place	2017 Germany/France	

World Junior Championships
Silver medal – second place	2011 United States	
Silver medal – second place	2010 Canada	

de Haan first represented the Canadian junior team at the 2009 IIHF World U18 Championships, scoring six assists in six games. He won a silver medal at the 2010 World Junior Ice Hockey Championships, though he missed two games after suffering a head injury in a game against Switzerland. On November 29, 2010, he was named to the 2011 Canadian World Junior Team selection camp for the second time, one of only four returning members from the 2010 silver-medal team. On December 19, 2010, de Haan was named an alternate captain to Ryan Ellis of the Windsor Spitfires for the 2011 Canadian junior team, along with Brayden Schenn of the Brandon Wheat Kings and Jared Cowen of the Spokane Chiefs, his fellow returnees.

== Career statistics ==
=== Regular season and playoffs ===
			Regular season					Playoffs
Season	Team	League	GP	G	A	Pts	PIM	GP	G	A	Pts	PIM
2006–07	Ottawa Valley Titans AAA	HEO U16	32	4	22	26	20	—	—	—	—	—
2007–08	Kemptville 73's	CJHL	58	3	39	42	14	—	—	—	—	—
2008–09	Oshawa Generals	OHL	68	8	55	63	40	—	—	—	—	—
2009–10	Oshawa Generals	OHL	34	5	19	24	14	—	—	—	—	—
2010–11	Oshawa Generals	OHL	55	6	42	48	48	11	1	11	12	6
2011–12	Bridgeport Sound Tigers	AHL	56	2	14	16	24	—	—	—	—	—
2011–12	New York Islanders	NHL	1	0	0	0	0	—	—	—	—	—
2012–13	Bridgeport Sound Tigers	AHL	3	0	2	2	4	—	—	—	—	—
2013–14	Bridgeport Sound Tigers	AHL	17	1	2	3	8	—	—	—	—	—
2013–14	New York Islanders	NHL	51	3	13	16	30	—	—	—	—	—
2014–15	New York Islanders	NHL	65	1	11	12	24	5	0	1	1	2
2015–16	New York Islanders	NHL	72	2	14	16	20	11	0	2	2	2
2016–17	New York Islanders	NHL	82	5	20	25	36	—	—	—	—	—
2017–18	New York Islanders	NHL	33	1	11	12	8	—	—	—	—	—
2018–19	Carolina Hurricanes	NHL	74	1	13	14	20	12	1	0	1	2
2019–20	Chicago Blackhawks	NHL	29	1	5	6	10	9	0	1	1	0
2020–21	Chicago Blackhawks	NHL	44	1	9	10	14	—	—	—	—	—
2021–22	Chicago Blackhawks	NHL	69	4	4	8	33	—	—	—	—	—
2022–23	Carolina Hurricanes	NHL	53	2	10	12	20	—	—	—	—	—
2023–24	Tampa Bay Lightning	NHL	59	3	7	10	22	1	0	0	0	0
2024–25	Colorado Avalanche	NHL	44	0	7	7	10	—	—	—	—	—
2024–25	New York Rangers	NHL	3	0	1	1	2	—	—	—	—	—
2025–26	Rögle BK	SHL	46	3	13	16	47	15	0	9	9	4
NHL totals			679	24	125	149	249	38	1	4	5	6

=== International ===
Year	Team	Event	Result	GP	G	A	Pts	PIM
2009	Canada	U18	4th	6	0	6	6	0
2010	Canada	WJC	2nd place, silver medalist(s)	4	0	1	1	0
2011	Canada	WJC	2nd place, silver medalist(s)	6	0	5	5	2
2017	Canada	WC	2nd place, silver medalist(s)	10	0	1	1	8
Junior totals				16	0	12	12	2
Senior totals				10	0	1	1	8

Awards and achievements
Preceded by John Tavares	New York Islanders first round pick 2009	Succeeded by Nino Niederreiter
