= Holy Trinity Catholic High School (Kanata) =

Holy Trinity High School

Location
- 180 Katimavik Road; Ottawa, Ontario, K2L 4A7; Canada

Information
- School type: High school
- Motto: Faith, Excellence, Truth
- Religious affiliation: Catholic
- Opened: October 29, 1990
- School board: Ottawa Catholic School Board
- Superintendent: Tim Slack
- Area trustee: Sandra Moore
- Principal: Corinne Pinault
- Grades: 7-12
- Enrollment: ~2000
- Language: English, French
- Colours: Green & Blue
- Mascot: Twisty The Tornado
- Team name: Tornadoes
- Rival: All Saints High School
- Website: trh.ocsb.ca

Holy Trinity Catholic High School is a secondary school located in the Kanata district of Ottawa, Ontario, Canada. It serves students from grades 7 through 12. It is the first of its architectural design by Edward J. Cuhaci in Ottawa, opened in 1990. It was followed by five identical schools in the Ottawa-Carleton Catholic School Board.

== History ==
The school was initially constructed to relieve overcrowding at St. Paul's located a few kilometers to the east. Because of a construction strike, the school was not ready to open on time, and students had to share the building at St. Paul's for the first two months. Students from Holy Trinity attended classes in the morning, starting an hour earlier than usual and going until noon. Students that would have been attending St. Paul's attended classes in the afternoon. By the beginning of November 1990, all work on the new school was complete, and students moved into their new location.

== See also ==
- Education in Ontario
- List of secondary schools in Ontario
