= Flato Markham Theatre =

- Interactive map of the Flato Markham Theatre area
- Former names: Markham Theatre for the Performing Arts
- Alternative names: Markham Theatre

General information
- Type: Arts complex
- Architectural style: Modern
- Location: 171 Town Centre Boulevard, Markham, Ontario, Canada
- Coordinates: 43°51′30″N 79°20′12″W
- Current tenants: Markham Little Theatre, Markham Concert Band
- Construction started: 1983
- Completed: 1985
- Inaugurated: 1985
- Owner: City of Markham

Other information
- Seating type: Auditorium
- Seating capacity: 527

Website
- flatomarkhamtheatre.ca

The Flato Markham Theatre is a public arts complex located at 171 Town Centre Boulevard in the city of Markham, Ontario, Canada.

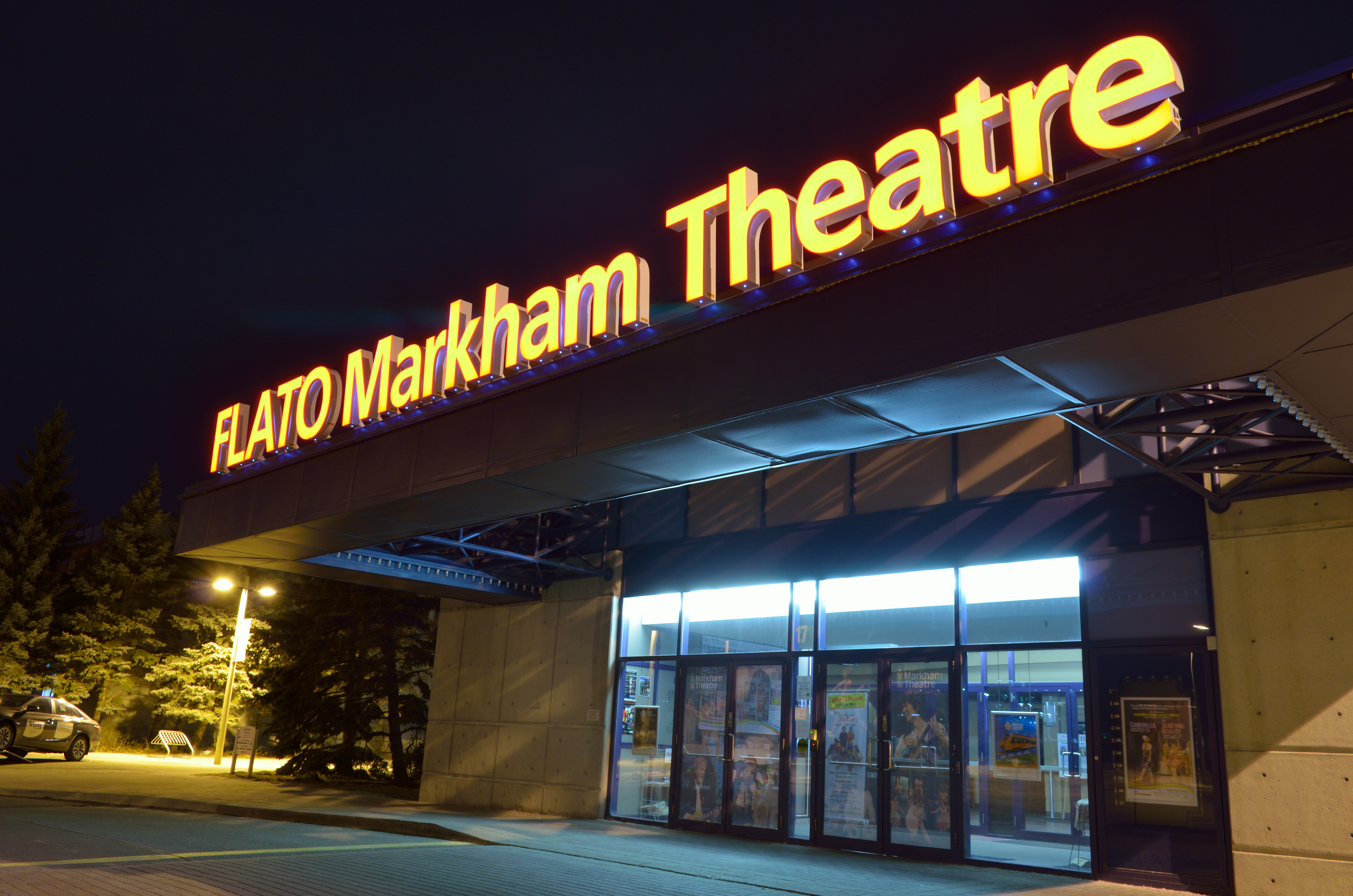
FLATO Markham Theatre at night

The theatre initially opened in 1985 for local and school based productions. The theatre is best known for its performances in performing arts and drama.

The theatre is owned and operated by the City of Markham. The name of the venue changed from Markham Theatre to Flato Markham Theatre when FLATO Developments acquired naming rights in April 2012.

== Facilities ==
- 527-seat house
- Auditorium
- Multiple rooms and lounges
- Multi-level lobby with a capacity of 500 patrons
- Rehearsal hall

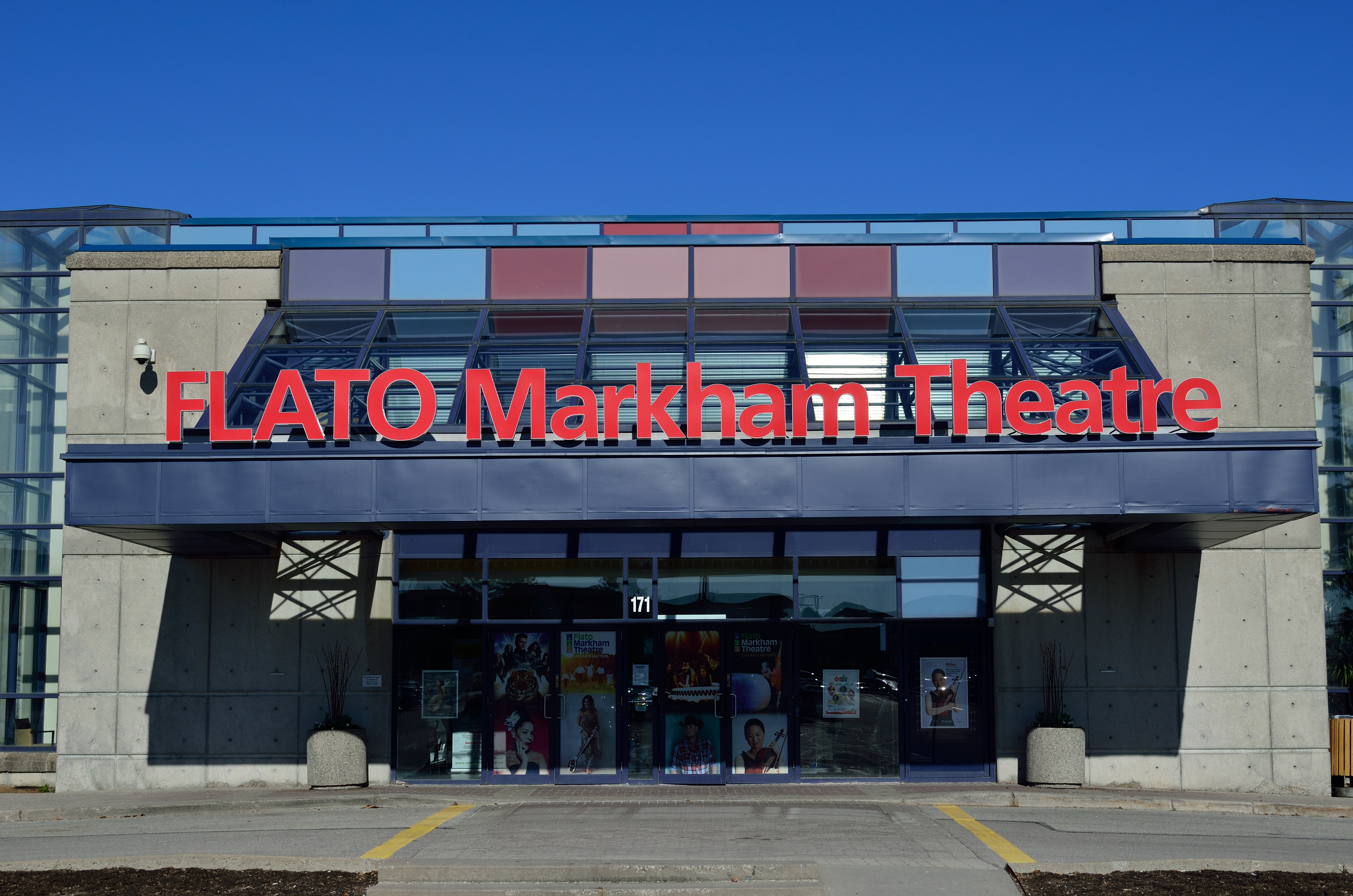
Entrance to the complex.
