= Alison Smyth (actress) =

Canadian actress, singer, and educator

- Occupations: Actress, Singer, Educator
- Years active: 2004–present

Alison Smyth is a Canadian actress, singer, and educator. She trained in classical vocal performance at The Glenn Gould School in Toronto. She is a performing artist and member of ACTRA and the Canadian Actors' Equity Association (CAEA). In January 2016, Smyth launched her own performing arts studio: Alison Smyth Performing Arts. The studio provides in-person and virtual personal coaching and group workshops in acting, singing, directing, and mentoring. Smyth became a certified yoga teacher in 2014 through the Downward Dog Yoga Centre in Toronto. In 2022, Smyth won the BroadwayWorld Ottawa Award for Best Performer in a Play for her roll in The Fourposter.

== Performances ==
=== Theatrical performances ===
Performance	Role	Producer/Director
I Ought To Be In Pictures	Libby Tucker	Classic Theatre Festival/Laurel Smith
Wait Until Dark	Susy Hendrix	Classic Theatre Festival/Laurel Smith
Hilda's Yard	Bobbi Jakes	Port Stanley Festival Theatre/Simon Joynes
Test Drive	Dorothy & others	Festival Players of Prince Edward County/Sarah Phillips
Evil Dead: The Musical	Cheryl	Starvox Entertainment/Christopher Bond
Head À Tête	Yves	Magnus Theatre/Lila Cano
The Day Billy Lived	Rebecca & others	Magnus Theatre/Lila Cano
The Miracle Man	Little André	Renaissance Theatre/Eda Holmes
Anne of Avonlea	Josie Pye	Sullivan Entertainment/Kevin Sullivan
Jersey Boys	Francine Valli	Dancap Productions/Des McAnuff
Evil Dead: The Musical	Cheryl	Latimer Entertainment/Christopher Bond
Anne of Green Gables - The Musical	Diana Barry	The Charlottetown Festival/Anne Allan
Hairspray	Shelley/ Tracy understudy	Mirvish Productions/Jack O'Brien

=== Film performances ===
Performance	Role	Producer/Director
Hairspray	Auditionee	New Line Cinema/Adam Shankman

== Productions directed ==
Production	Company	Location
Aladdin	Flato Markham Theatre	Flato Markham Theatre
The Jungle Book	Flato Markham Theatre	Flato Markham Theatre
Little Women	No Strings Theatre	Meridian Arts Centre
Anne of Green Gables - The Musical	No Strings Theatre	Meridian Arts Centre

== Awards ==
- Best Actress in a Featured Role (Jersey Boys) - 2010 Broadwayworld.com Toronto Awards
- Arts & Literature - 1999 Spirit of the Capital Awards
- Best Performer in a Play (The Fourposter) - 2022 BroadwayWorld Ottawa Awards
