= Ottawa West Golden Knights =

- City: Ottawa, Ontario, Canada
- League: Eastern Ontario Junior Hockey League
- Division: Martin
- Founded: 1973
- Home arena: Barbara Ann Scott Arena
- Colours: Black, white, orange, gold
- Owner: Steve Sundin
- General manager: Steve Sundin
- Head coach: Steve Sundin

The Ottawa West Golden Knights are a Canadian Junior ice hockey team based in Ottawa, Ontario. Between 2014-15 and the end of the 2019-2020 seasons, the EOJHL and the CCHL set a new agreement in an attempt to create a better player development model. This resulted in the league re-branding itself as the Central Canada Hockey League Tier 2 (CCHL2), and shrinking to 16 teams and two divisions. The league reverted to the Eastern Ontario Junior Hockey League for 2021. The Golden Knights are in the Martin Division.

== History ==
From the 2001-02 season to the 2008-09 season, the Golden Knights won five league championships in eight seasons. Their greatest challenge in this period may have been the Westport Rideaus in the 2005-06 playoffs. The Rideaus had the Golden Knights pinned down and against the wall 3 games to 2 in the final series, but the Golden Knights battled back and took the last two nail-biters to win their fourth title. The Golden Knights had a banner year for the 2008-2009 season by winning the D. Arnold Carson trophy for the 6th time in the team's history and its 5th league championship in 8 years. The Knights also captured the 2008 Boxing Day Tournament title.

However, by 2012-2013 the team was in a rebuild year after losing 3 Top defencemen in Neil Clarke, Mitch Fournier and Sebastien Dubus, goaltender Jacob Blair who moved on to the Ottawa 67's, and a top forward in Ben Minkus.

== Season-by-season results ==
| Season | GP | W | L | T | OTL | GF | GA | P | Results | Playoffs |
| 1999-00 | 42 | 28 | 13 | 1 | 1 | 204 | 154 | 58 | 2nd EO Metro | Lost division final |
| 2000-01 | 42 | 24 | 19 | 2 | 5 | 169 | 143 | 55 | 5th EO Metro | Lost Division S-final |
| 2001-02 | 40 | 30 | 8 | 2 | 1 | 190 | 122 | 63 | 1st EO Metro | Won League |
| 2002-03 | 40 | 26 | 14 | 0 | 1 | 174 | 121 | 53 | 1st EO Metro | Won League |
| 2003-04 | 40 | 24 | 15 | 1 | 0 | 214 | 143 | 49 | 3rd EO Metro | Lost Division S-final |
| 2004-05 | 40 | 30 | 6 | 2 | 2 | 204 | 116 | 64 | 1st EO Metro | Won League |
| 2005-06 | 39 | 27 | 9 | 2 | 1 | 187 | 124 | 57 | 2nd EO Metro | Won League |
| 2006-07 | 40 | 24 | 15 | 1 | 0 | 168 | 141 | 49 | 4th EO Metro | Lost Division S-final |
| 2007-08 | 40 | 20 | 16 | 2 | 2 | 156 | 137 | 44 | 4th EO Metro | Lost final |
| 2008-09 | 40 | 29 | 7 | 3 | 1 | 212 | 105 | 62 | 1st EO Metro | Won League |
| 2009-10 | 44 | 32 | 9 | 3 | 0 | 207 | 117 | 67 | 1st EO Metro | Lost division final |
| 2010-11 | 42 | 27 | 14 | 0 | 1 | 198 | 153 | 55 | 2nd EO Metro | Lost division final |
| 2011-12 | 42 | 25 | 12 | 5 | 0 | 195 | 150 | 55 | 3rd EO Metro | Lost division final |
| 2012-13 | 42 | 23 | 18 | - | 1 | 177 | 171 | 47 | 4th EO Metro | Lost Division S-Final |
| 2013-14 | 41 | 28 | 12 | - | 1 | 167 | 135 | 57 | 1st EO Metro | Lost final |
| 2014-15 | 40 | 23 | 16 | - | 1 | 159 | 155 | 47 | 1st EO Metro | Won Div. Semi-final, 4-0 (Jets); Lost Div. Finals, 2-4 (Mustangs) |
CCHL 2 2020-21 return to EOJHL
| Season | GP | W | L | OTL | SOL | GF | GA | P | Results | Playoffs |
| 2015-16 | 44 | 27 | 15 | 1 | 1 | 209 | 161 | 56 | 2nd of 8 Martin; 4th of 16 CCHL2 | Won quarterfinal, 2-4 (Jets); Lost semi-finals 0-4 (Vikings) |
| 2016-17 | 48 | 39 | 7 | 1 | 1 | 265 | 164 | 80 | 1st of 8 Martin Div; 1st of 16 CCHL2 | Won quarterfinals, 4-3 (Beavers); Lost semifinals, 0-4 (Vikings) |
| 2017-18 | 52 | 28 | 17 | 2 | 5 | 205 | 177 | 63 | 4th of 8 Martin Div; 7th of 16 CCHL2 | Lost Div. Qualifying 1-2 (Panthers) |
| 2018-19 | 44 | 29 | 13 | 1 | 1 | 166 | 133 | 60 | 3rd of 8 Martin Div; 3rd of 16 CCHL2 | Lost Div. Semis 1-4 (Vikings) |
| 2019-20 | 44 | 36 | 6 | 1 | 1 | 192 | 108 | 74 | 1st of 8 Martin Div; 1st of 16 CCHL2 | Incomplete Div. Semis 1-1 (Vikings) |
| 2020-21 | Season lost to covid | | | | | | | | | |
| 2021-22 | 42 | 33 | 7 | 0 | 2 | 200 | 98 | 68 | 1st of 8 Martin Div; 1st of 16 EOJHL | Won Div. Semis 3-1 (Canadians); Lost Div Semi 2-4 (Vikings) |
| 2022-23 | 42 | 24 | 16 | 1 | 1 | 170 | 141 | 50 | 4th of 8 Martin Div; 8th of 16 EOJHL | Lost Div. Quarters 0-2 (Canadians) |
| 2023-24 | 44 | 36 | 7 | 0 | 1 | 209 | 102 | 73 | 1st of 7 Martin Div; 1st of 14 EOJHL | Won Div. Semis 4-1 (Panthers); Lost Div Finals, 2-4 (Vikings) |
| 2024-25 | 48 | 31 | 12 | 3 | 2 | 203 | 150 | 67 | 3rd of 6 Martin Div; 3rd of 13 EOJHL | Lost Div. Semis 1-4 (Canadians) |
| 2025-26 | 44 | 32 | 6 | 4 | 2 | 178 | 83 | 67 | 2nd of 6 Martin Div; 2nd of 13 EOJHL | Lost Div. Semis 3-4 (Canadians) |

== 2026-27 staff ==
- Owner - Steve Sundin
- Director of Hockey Operations - Lindsay Soubliere
- Head Coach - Steve Sundin
- General Manager - Steve Sundin
- Assistant General Manager - Matt Soubliere
- Assistant Coach - Seamus Lockhart
- Goalie Coach - James Cole
- Trainer - Katie Craig
- Equipment Manager - Daniel Henry
- Scorekeeper - Kevin Ferguson
- Broadcaster - Mason Detre

== Notable alumni ==
- Luke Richardson
- Gary Galley
- Paul Byron
- Eric O'Dell
- Corey Foster
