= Sunny A. Smith =

American artist (born 1972)

Sunny A. Smith (born 1972 in Manassas, Virginia) is an American artist who is based in Oakland, California. Smith's work draws from American history to create artworks which combine social practice, performance, and craft-based sculpture.

Smith has exhibited their work professionally since 1995 in the United States and internationally. They have produced over twenty-five solo exhibitions, installations, performances, and artist-led participatory projects for the San Francisco Museum of Modern Art, Public Art Fund, The Aldrich Contemporary Art Museum, Museum of Contemporary Art Denver, Mildred Lane Kemper Art Museum, Berkeley Art Museum, The Arts Club of Chicago, and Indianapolis Museum of Art.

In a 2008 group interview with art historian Julia Bryan-Wilson in Modern Painters, Smith states "We are conceptual artists whose subject is craft," indicating Smith's theoretical framework and the personal theory behind much of Smith's work.

== Education and early career ==
Smith received a Bachelor of Arts (BA) in psychology from The New School for Social Research, a Bachelor of Fine Arts (BFA) in fine arts from Parsons School of Design, and a Master of Fine Arts (MFA) in sculpture from the Yale University School of Art. They also participated in the Whitney Museum Independent Study Program. They lived in New York City from 1990 until 2008 when they relocated to the San Francisco Bay Area to join the faculty of California College of the Arts, where they are a tenured professor and Chair of the Sculpture Program.

== Career ==
Sunny A. Smith has exhibited their work professionally since 1995 in the United States and in England, France, Germany, Spain, New Zealand, and South Korea. They have produced over twenty-five solo exhibitions, installations, performances, and artist-led participatory projects for the San Francisco Museum of Modern Art, Public Art Fund, The Aldrich Contemporary Art Museum, Museum of Contemporary Art Denver, Mildred Lane Kemper Art Museum, Berkeley Art Museum, The Arts Club of Chicago, and Indianapolis Museum of Art.

They have exhibited their work in over one hundred group exhibitions at galleries and museums including P.S.1 Contemporary Art Center at the Museum of Modern Art New York, Palais de Tokyo, Massachusetts Museum of Contemporary Art, Contemporary Arts Museum Houston, Andy Warhol Museum, The Mattress Factory, and The Tang Museum. Smith has lectured on their work extensively at art schools and research universities in the United States and abroad, as well as at the Museum of Modern Art, the Whitney Museum of American Art, the Metropolitan Museum of Art, SculptureCenter and the Vera List Center for Art and Politics.

Their work has been featured and reviewed in The New York Times, Artforum, Art in America, Sculpture, on NPR, KQED, Art:21, and in other media and scholarly publications. Smith has received generous support from United States Artists, Arts Council England, For-Site Foundation, Creative Work Fund, Foundation for Contemporary Arts, Artadia, and New York Foundation for the Arts. Notable residencies include the Carpenter Center for the Visual Arts at Harvard University, the Museum of Modern Art Artists Experiment initiative, the International Studio and Curatorial Program in Brooklyn, New York, Artpace San Antonio, Texas, and Headlands Center for the Arts in Sausalito, California.

Smith's work is held in the collections of the Whitney Museum of American Art, Los Angeles County Museum of Art, and the Saatchi Gallery London

== Notable works ==
In 2005, Smith produced a public art project The Muster that engages with the question, "What are you fighting for?" on the subject of Civil War reenactments, involving participants who made uniforms and campsites. In an article in ArtNet News discussing art about Civil War reenactments, Brian Boucher says it "focused on the kitschy aesthetics of Civil War reenactment, referring to the conflict in only the most oblique way."
In 2008, Smith produced a performance art project The Donkey, The Jackass, and The Mule which involved three large carved wooden horse statues on wheels (in reference to President Andrew Jackson's opponents slogan "Andrew Jackson was a Jackass") and many humans horse handlers in an interpretation of 19th century dress shouting "cast that vote" and carrying signs relating to women's suffrage down an Indianapolis highway overpass as part of the 2008 Indianapolis Museum of Art's exhibition On Procession curated by Rebecca Uchill. This work is deeply engaged with early American aesthetics and symbols, from the Andrew Jackson slogan to the idea of "40 acres and a mule".

In 2009, Smith produced Needle Work in which they re-created the cloth gas masks commonly used in World Wars I and II. These masks were not commonly collected or held by museums as they were often home made and most of the traces exist within grainy photographs. Given what we know about the creation of these masks, Smith attempted to re-create them the best they could using common household materials of today such as plastic water bottles. Given the context of 2009, these masks were hauntingly familiar to viewers as they remember the horrors of the Abu Ghraib Archive

In 2013, Smith exhibited Stockpile, an assemblage of Early American wood furniture, in Santa Barbara, CA at the Santa Barbara Museum of Art. This work aimed to consider the purpose of the objects, where and how they are made, and the arrangement of the items suggesting a panicked stockpile

== Sources ==
New York Times, By MARTHA SCHWENDENERJUNE 7, 2013; Fifes and Drums as Performance Art A Review of ‘Allison Smith: Rudiments of Fife and Drum,’ at the Aldrich Museum in Ridgefield
