= Paul Byron =

Canadian ice hockey player (born 1989)

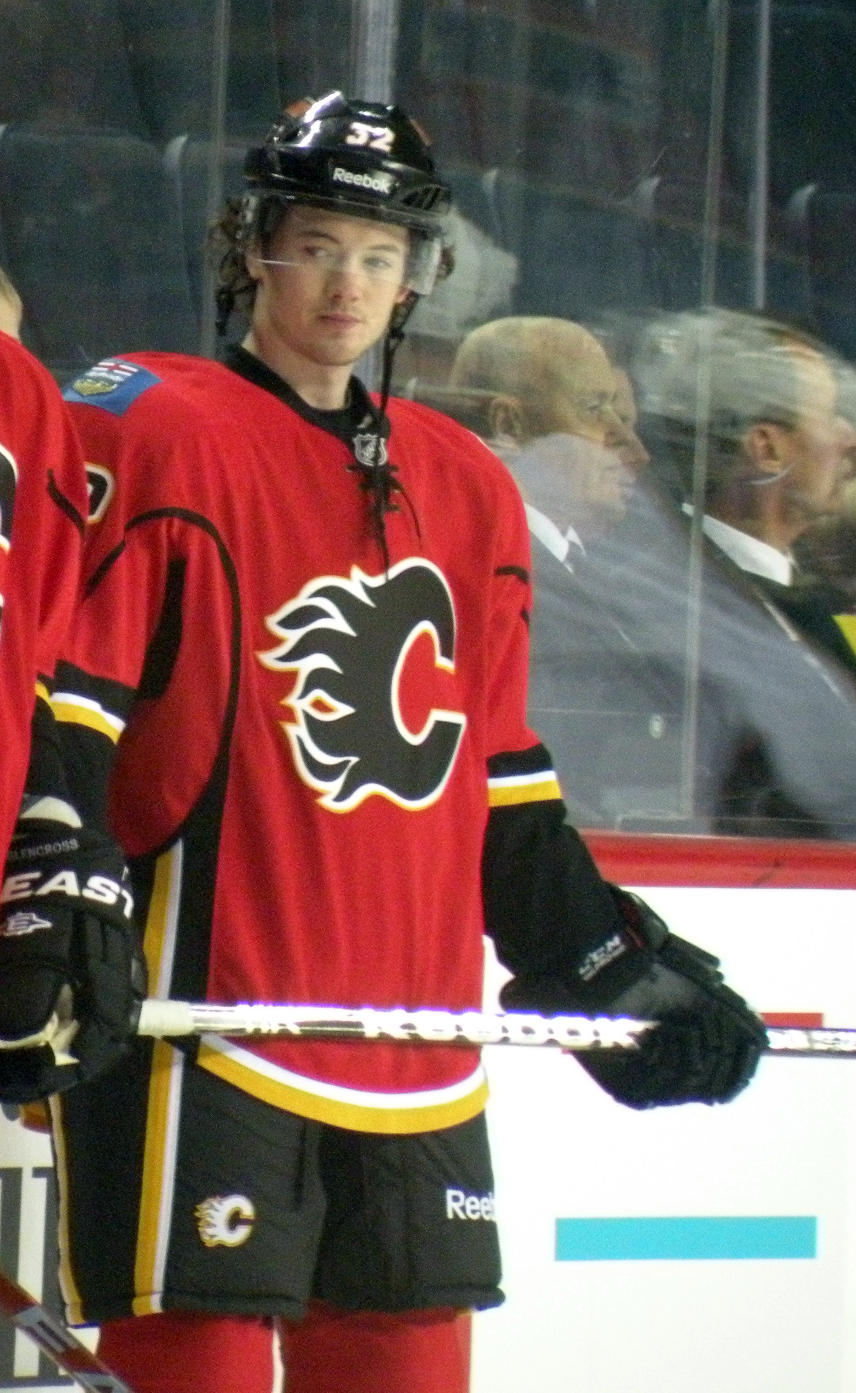
- Byron with the Calgary Flames in 2011
- Born: April 27, 1989 (age 37) Ottawa, Ontario, Canada
- Height: 5 ft 9 in (175 cm)
- Weight: 160 lb (73 kg; 11 st 6 lb)
- Position: Left wing
- Shot: Left
- Played for: Buffalo Sabres; Calgary Flames; Montreal Canadiens
- NHL draft: 179th overall, 2007; Buffalo Sabres
- Playing career: 2009–2022

James Paul Byron (born April 27, 1989) is a Canadian former professional ice hockey left winger who played a total of 12 seasons in the National Hockey League (NHL). He was selected in the sixth round, 179th overall, by the Buffalo Sabres in the 2007 NHL entry draft. Byron also played for the Calgary Flames and Montreal Canadiens.

== Playing career ==
=== Amateur ===
A native of Ottawa, Byron first played junior B hockey with the Ottawa West Golden Knights in 2005–06. He moved up to major-junior the following season with the Gatineau Olympiques of the Quebec Major Junior Hockey League (QMJHL). Following a 44-point campaign in 2006–07, the Buffalo Sabres chose to select him with their sixth round pick, 179th overall, at the 2007 NHL entry draft. He remained in junior in 2007–08 where he improved to 68 points in 52 games for the Olympiques. Byron scored 32 points in 19 playoff games – second only to teammate Claude Giroux's 51 points – to help lead Gatineau to the President's Cup championship and a berth in the 2008 Memorial Cup. He played a third and final season in the QMJHL in 2008–09 where he scored 99 points in 64 games and was named a second-team all-star.

=== Professional ===
==== Buffalo Sabres (2009–11) ====
Byron signed a three-year contract with the Sabres on June 1, 2009, only a few hours before Buffalo would have lost his rights. He was assigned to the Sabres's top minor league affiliate, the Portland Pirates of the American Hockey League (AHL) for the 2009–10 season. He played the entire season in Portland, scoring 33 points in 57 games, and spent the majority of the 2010–11 season there as well, improving to 53 points in 67 games. Byron earned a recall to the NHL during the season and made his NHL debut on January 22, 2011. He scored his first NHL point, an assist on a Tyler Myers goal, in a 5–3 victory over the New York Islanders. He scored his first goal two nights later in his hometown against the Ottawa Senators.

==== Calgary Flames (2011–15) ====
A draft-day trade on June 25, 2011, sent Byron, along with Chris Butler, to the Calgary Flames in exchange for Robyn Regehr, Aleš Kotalík and a draft pick. He spent the majority of the season with the Abbotsford Heat of the AHL, but earned several recalls to Calgary. On one such recall, he scored on his first career penalty shot in a 5–1 victory over the Toronto Maple Leafs. Byron's 2012–13 season was marred by injury as he missed over a month of play due to a shoulder injury. He spent the majority of the season with Abbotsford, where he recorded 15 points in 38 games. He was recalled to Calgary in mid February, but suffered a broken hand early in his first game of the season with the Flames. He played an additional three games following his recovery and recorded an assist.

After beginning the 2013–14 season in Abbotsford, the five-foot-nine Byron earned a regular spot in the Flames line-up by playing an aggressive style that impressed head coach Bob Hartley: "The size of the heart is much more important than the physical size. Here's a guy who plays like he's six-foot-two, six-foot-three. He's not avoiding traffic."

==== Montreal Canadiens and retirement (2015–2023) ====
Following the 2014–15 season, Byron became a restricted free agent under the NHL Collective Bargaining Agreement. The Calgary Flames made him a qualifying offer to retain his NHL rights, and on July 5, 2015, Byron filed for Salary Arbitration. On the eve of the beginning of the 2015–16 season, Byron was acquired off waivers from the Flames by the Montreal Canadiens on October 6, 2015. The decision was motivated in part by a fan-made YouTube video showing numerous examples of Byron missing breakaway shots, which showcased his speed to Montreal's scouting staff. On February 23, 2016, Byron signed a three-year contract with the Canadiens worth a total of 3.5 million dollars. During the 2016-17 season, Byron recorded career-highs in goals with 22, assists with 21 and total points with 43, finishing second on the Montreal Canadiens in goals.

On September 22, 2018, Byron signed a four-year, 13.6 million-dollar contract extension with the Canadiens lasting until the 2022–23 season, after having yet another 20-goal season with a struggling Canadiens team in the 2017–18 season. On October 1, after Shea Weber was named captain of the Canadiens, Byron was named an alternate captain, along with Brendan Gallagher.

Byron began to play through hip pain for a number of years, culminating in having to take nine games off during the pandemic-shortened 2020–21 season. He had been placed on waivers three times during that season in what the team insisted was strictly a measure to save money under the salary cap. Byron received a cortisone injection to allow him to return for the final two games of the regular season and the 2021 Stanley Cup playoffs. In the first game of the Canadiens' round one series against the Toronto Maple Leafs, Byron scored the game-winning goal on a breakaway where he was tripped by opposing defenseman Rasmus Sandin but made the shot from his knees. The Montreal Gazette observed that "the goal will be on highlight reels for years to come." The Canadiens lost the next three games of the series and were on the brink of elimination, by which point Byron's hip pain had returned, and he willed himself to play what "could be your last game of the year. You just got to grind through it, push through it, give everything you have." However, the Canadiens would go on to win the next three games to take the series, beginning a deep run to the 2021 Stanley Cup Finals. Byron played the entire time, saying that "the more the adrenaline kind of hit, the more you got into playoffs, it was like the pain and everything just started to disappear." The Canadiens lost in the Finals to the Tampa Bay Lightning, four games to one.

Following the Finals, Byron opted to undergo left hip surgery, and missed the first half of the 2021–22 season. After returning to the lineup amidst a historically poor season for the Canadiens, Byron played his 500th game in the NHL on February 17, 2022, scoring a goal in the team's 3–2 victory over the St. Louis Blues. He played twenty-five games, being sidelined three times with other injuries, to his frustration. These health problems continued into the 2022–23 season, with his left hip again preventing him from skating. On October 11, the Canadiens placed Byron on long-term injured reserve. He did not play in the final year of his contract, continuing to suffer from hip pain that affected his daily life, including his ability to play with his children. Byron used the time to observe team operations, and said that he hoped "to be part of the team moving forward and transition into a different role."

On September 20, 2023, Byron officially announced his retirement, transitioning into a player development role in the Canadiens' front office.

== Personal life ==
Byron and his wife Sarah Leblond have a daughter and son together.

== Career statistics ==
			Regular season					Playoffs
Season	Team	League	GP	G	A	Pts	PIM	GP	G	A	Pts	PIM
2005–06	Ottawa West Golden Knights	EOJHL	33	20	23	43	33	7	3	8	11	4
2006–07	Gatineau Olympiques	QMJHL	68	21	23	44	46	5	5	1	6	2
2007–08	Gatineau Olympiques	QMJHL	52	37	31	68	25	19	21	11	32	12
2008–09	Gatineau Olympiques	QMJHL	64	33	66	99	32	10	2	14	16	4
2009–10	Portland Pirates	AHL	57	14	19	33	59	4	0	0	0	0
2010–11	Portland Pirates	AHL	67	26	27	53	52	12	2	5	7	6
2010–11	Buffalo Sabres	NHL	8	1	1	2	2	—	—	—	—	—
2011–12	Abbotsford Heat	AHL	39	7	14	21	40	8	1	3	4	2
2011–12	Calgary Flames	NHL	22	3	2	5	2	—	—	—	—	—
2012–13	Abbotsford Heat	AHL	38	6	9	15	38	—	—	—	—	—
2012–13	Calgary Flames	NHL	4	0	1	1	2	—	—	—	—	—
2013–14	Abbotsford Heat	AHL	23	5	13	18	4	—	—	—	—	—
2013–14	Calgary Flames	NHL	47	7	14	21	27	—	—	—	—	—
2014–15	Calgary Flames	NHL	57	6	13	19	8	—	—	—	—	—
2015–16	Montreal Canadiens	NHL	62	11	7	18	11	—	—	—	—	—
2016–17	Montreal Canadiens	NHL	81	22	21	43	29	6	1	0	1	0
2017–18	Montreal Canadiens	NHL	82	20	15	35	23	—	—	—	—	—
2018–19	Montreal Canadiens	NHL	56	15	16	31	17	—	—	—	—	—
2019–20	Montreal Canadiens	NHL	29	4	6	10	4	10	1	3	4	6
2020–21	Montreal Canadiens	NHL	46	5	11	16	12	22	3	3	6	10
2021–22	Montreal Canadiens	NHL	27	4	3	7	2	—	—	—	—	—
NHL totals			521	98	110	208	139	38	5	6	11	16

== Awards and honours ==
Award	Year
QMJHL
Second All-Star Team	2009
