= Alison Smith (curator) =

Alison Smith (born 1962) is director of collections and research at the Wallace Collection, having previously been chief curator at the National Portrait Gallery, London from 2017 until 2024. Before that she spent eighteen years at Tate Britain working as a curator of nineteenth-century British art.

== Selected publications ==
- With Tim Barringer and Jason Rosenfeld, Pre-Raphaelites: Victorian Avant-Garde, exhibition catalogue, Tate Britain, London 2012, 256pp.
- Watercolour, exhibition catalogue, Tate Britain, London 2011, 192pp.
- Symbolism in Poland and Britain, exhibition catalogue, Tate Britain, London 2009, 40pp.
- With Jason Rosenfeld, Millais, exhibition catalogue, Tate Britain, London 2007, 272pp.
- The Enfranchised Eye, in Alison Smith, Allen Staley and Christopher Newall (eds.), Pre-Raphaelite Landscape: Truth to Nature, exhibition catalogue, Tate Britain, London 2004, pp. 11–24.
- G.F. Watts and the National Gallery of British Art, in Colin Trodd and Stephanie Brown (eds.), Representations of G.F. Watts: Art Making in Victorian Culture, Farnham 2004, pp. 153–68.
- Exposed: The Victorian Nude, exhibition catalogue, Tate Britain, London 2002, 288pp.
- A "State" Gallery? The Management of British Art During the Early Years of the Tate, in Colin Trodd and Paul Barlow (eds.), Governing Cultures: Institutions of Art in Victorian London, Farnham 2000, pp. 187–98.
- John Petts and the Caseg Press, Farnham 2000, 128pp.
- The Victorian Nude: Sexuality, Morality and Art, Manchester 1996, 256pp.
