= Académie catholique Ange-Gabriel =

Location
- 1515 Kensington Parkway; Brockville, Ontario, K6V 6H9; Canada; 44°36′44″N 75°43′04″W

Information
- School type: Public, Separate Elementary school and high school
- Motto: Ange-Gabriel : j'y crois! (Ange-Gabriel: I believe!)
- Religious affiliation: Catholic
- Founded: 1995
- School board: Conseil des écoles catholiques du Centre-Est
- Area trustee: Diane Burns
- School number: 735632 (elementary); 855949 (secondary)
- Principal: Chantal Blanchet
- Grades: Junior Kindergarten – 12
- Language: French
- Website: ange-gabriel.ecolecatholique.ca/fr/

The Académie catholique Ange-Gabriel is a French school in the city of Brockville, Ontario, Canada. It is part of the Conseil des écoles catholiques du Centre-Est school board and offers instruction from junior kindergarten to grade 12. It has a population of 360 students.

== History ==
The school was established in 1995 based on the recognition of the need for a French language school within the city. During its first year, the school served eight students and operated in the basement of the Centennial Road Standard Church. In 1997, the school moved to Sharpe's Lane off Highway 2 East. In 2006, the school moved to its current site in a new building on Kensington Parkway, three times bigger than the old school, and with space for a Centre des enfants (day care). As of 2025, Ange-Gabriel serves 360 students.
