= Lesya Granger =

Lesya Alexandra Granger
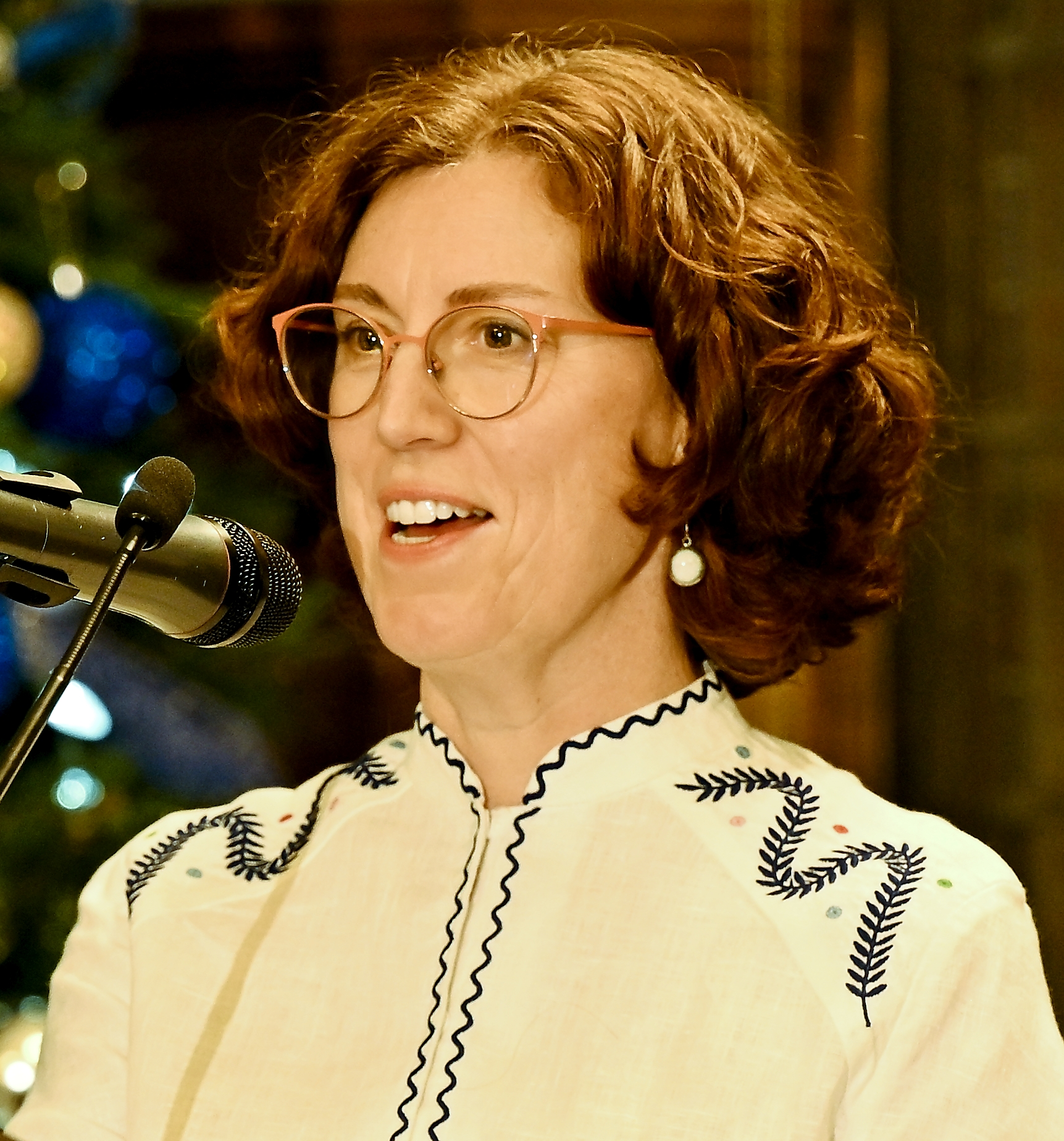
- Born: Ottawa, Ontario, Canada
- Education: BFA, Art History, University of Ottawa (1994); MA, Canadian Art History, Carleton University (1996); MA, Education, University of Ottawa (2020)
- Occupations: Educator, researcher, and community leader

Lesya Alexandra Granger is a Ukrainian-Canadian educator and community leader. She is the CEO of the non-profit organization Mriya Aid.

== Early life and education ==
Granger was born and lives in Ottawa. Her family immigrated to Canada during WWII, after the Soviet occupation of Ukraine. Her father served on the law faculty of the University of Ottawa.

In 1994, Granger earned a bachelor of fine arts and art history from the University of Ottawa. This was followed, in 1996, by a master of arts in canadian art history at Carleton University. She later obtained a master of arts in education in 2020 from the University of Ottawa.

== Career ==
Granger worked a marketing consultant and researcher at the Royal Canadian Mint from 1996–2002. From 2008 to 2013, she was director and program head of the Lesia Ukrainka Ukrainian School in Ottawa.

Between 2014 and 2021, she was a manager of the International and Indigenous Languages Program at the Conseil des écoles catholiques du Centre-est (CECCE).

In 2022, Granger began volunteering at Mriya Aid, a non-profit organization to assist Ukraine during the war. The organization provides Ukrainian sappers, military personnel, and emergency responders with essential equipment, personal protective gear, vehicles, and tools, as well as organizing training in humanitarian de-mining to international standards. Since 2023, she has served as the organisation's CEO. Between 2022 and 2025, Mriya Aid delivered 30 shipments including 12 shipping containers of humanitarian aid to Ukraine, including medical equipment and supplies for de-mining teamss.

== Personal life ==
As an artist, Granger took part in group and solo exhibits in Ottawa and Toronto. In 1996 and 1997, she was a member of a local artists’ collective, the Enriched Bread Artists. In 2008, she became 1 of 27 artists whose designs were chosen to adorn bike racks in Ottawa.

== Works ==
- Granger, L. (1996). "Notes on the Ukrainian Icon Tradition in Canada". In Klymasz, R. B. (ed.). Icon in Canada: Recent Findings from the Canadian Museum of Civilization. University of Ottawa Press. pp. 72–79. doi:10.2307/j.ctv16s45.10.
- Granger, L. A. (2018). "Encouraging the Use and Activation of Heritage Languages in the Broader Educational System". In Trifonas, P.; Aravossitas, T. (eds.). Handbook of Research and Practice in Heritage Language Education. Springer International Handbooks of Education. Cham: Springer. doi:10.1007/978-3-319-44694-3_16.

== Bibliography ==
- "Mriya Aid: Training & Safety for Ukrainian Deminers". New Pathway Ukrainian News. 2025-07-15.
- "Toronto to host 'Safeguarding Ukraine's Future' conference on security guarantees and demining for recovery". KTLA. EIN Presswire. 20 October 2024.
- "International and Indigenous Languages". CESBA.
- "Congratulations to Cameron Smith and Lesya Granger". EducLang - An education and languages research group. 2022-03-24.
- Pathway, New (2025-07-15). "Mriya Aid: Training & Safety for Ukrainian Deminers". New Pathway Ukrainian News | Новий Шлях Українські Вісті.
- "Lesya Granger and Lubomyr Chabursky, leaders of the Canadian nonprofit organization Mriya Aid". www.ukrinform.net.
