= École secondaire catholique Béatrice-Desloges =

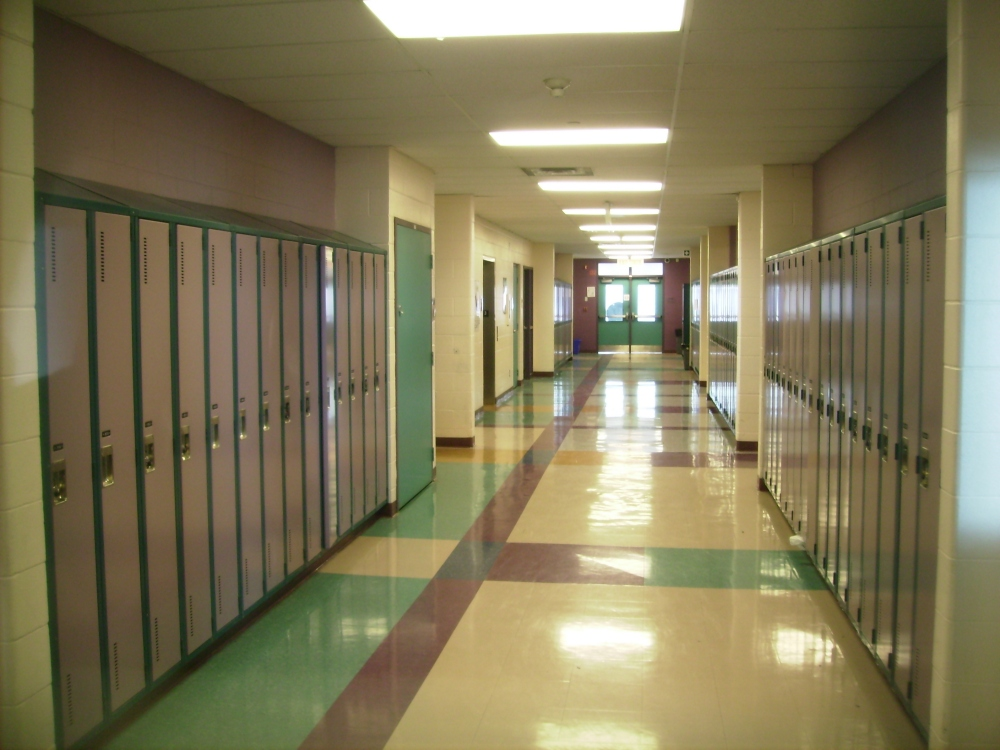

Location
- 1999, avenue Provence; Orléans, Ottawa, Ontario, K4A 3Y6; Canada; 45°28′06″N 75°27′32″W

Information
- School type: Francophone Separate Catholic (publicly funded)
- Motto: La réussite, j’y crois dur comme FER - Fierté, Excellence, Respect. (I believe that success is predicated on "Pride, Excellence and Respect".)
- Religious affiliation: Roman Catholic
- Founded: 1997
- School board: Conseil des écoles catholiques du Centre-Est
- Superintendent: Jason Dupuis
- Principal: Sébastien Pharand
- Grades: 7–12
- Language: French
- Colours: Blue and White
- Mascot: Bidou
- Website: www.beatrice-desloges.ecolecatholique.ca/fr/ (in French)

École secondaire catholique Béatrice-Desloges (ESCBD, Béatrice-Desloges Catholic High School) is a French language high school in the community of Orléans, in the eastern part of Ottawa, Ontario, Canada. The school also houses a community child day care centre, and is currently the largest or second largest and most populated French high school in Ontario, either surpassing or coming very close to that of the Thériault Catholic High School located in Timmins.

== History ==
The school is named after Béatrice Desloges, an early–twentieth-century Franco-Ontarian teacher in Ottawa who, with her sister Diane, successfully opposed Regulation 17, which forbade all French language teaching in the province of Ontario beyond grade 2.

The school opened its doors in 1997 to give more space to the overcrowded Garneau high school in Orléans, Ontario. The student population grew rapidly when the 7th and 8th grade groups were incorporated to the 9–12 group in 2001, and since then, the school has been undergoing expansion in order to accommodate the growing number of students.

In 2006, it was announced that an entirely new three-story section would be built where the previous school extension stood, and would be entirely dedicated to the 7th and 8th graders, thus separating them from older high school students. In addition to this, it was announced that a modern amphitheatre would be built inside, meaning that the previous theatre could be removed. This allowed the expansion of the cafeteria, which had been largely criticized for failing to accommodate the number of students over the years, and also allowed the addition of a new atrium, a gymnasium, and an exercise room. The gym was named after Olympian Lise Meloche. Although most of the construction was finished by the end of August 2007, the amphitheatre would not be opened until the beginning of spring 2008, costing in total a near twelve million dollars.

On March 2, 2007, the school was awarded the Prix jeunesse (youth prize) by the organization Communications et société for World Social Communications Day, for its unifying religious and artistic interpretation in "Le chemin de croix du XXI^{e} siècle" (The Way of the Cross of the 21st Century).

== Programs offered ==
=== Académie des arts ===
Béatrice-Desloges offers a Specialized Arts Program called Académie des arts (ADA, previously known as PSA) for students which starts from grade 7. Once a student officially enrolls into ADA by grade 9, he or she has to choose a specific domain of specialization: either Music, Visual and Digital Arts, or Drama. Within the Drama specialization, a partnership with the École nationale de l'humour (National Comedy school) of Montreal is offered for specific modules.

=== OptiMax ===
The school also offers a program for gifted students named OptiMax. To be admitted to the program the student must demonstrate high academic capabilities. There are categories within the program pertaining to specific age groups: grades 7 and 8 are in the Exploration program and Grades 9 and 10 in the Planification program.

== Notable alumni ==
- Claude Giroux − NHL hockey player for the Ottawa Senators
- Vincent De Haître − Speed skater who participated in the 2014 Winter Olympics in Sochi

== See also ==
- Education in Ontario
- List of secondary schools in Ontario
