= Mriya Aid =

Canadian non-profit organization

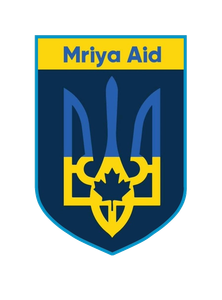
- Founded: February 2022
- Founder: Canadian project management professionals, security and defence specialists
- Type: Non-profit organization
- Headquarters: Canada
- Products: Humanitarian aid, humanitarian demining training, military equipment
- Leader: Lesya Granger
- Website: https://www.mriyaaid.ca/

Mriya Aid is a Canadian non-profit organization established in February 2022 by Canadian project management, defence and security professionals to provide systemic assistance to Ukrainian soldiers, deminers, and medics. The organization is led by Lesya Granger, CEO and Chair of the Board, with Lubomyr Chabursky serving as Secretary-Treasurer and Director of the Board, and Mark Paine, also a Director of the Board.

== History ==
Mriya Aid was founded to support Ukraine following the Russian invasion in February 2022. The organization is named after the Ukrainian Antonov An-225 "Mriya" airplane, a symbol of humanitarian aid, which was destroyed during the invasion. Initially, the organization focused on delivering drones and medical supplies to Ukraine, but later expanded to deminer training and providing essential equipment for Ukrainian military units and state agencies.

== Activities ==
=== Humanitarian Aid ===
Mriya Aid receives support from over 3,500 private donors across more than 30 countries, enabling it to procure and deliver humanitarian aid and specialized military equipment to Ukraine. Since 2022, the organization has partnered with over 100 Ukrainian military units and state institutions, with the total value of aid provided reaching over 10 million Canadian dollars.

=== Demining training ===
Since 2022, Mriya Aid has organized, paid for and overseen International Mine Action Standards (IMAS) Explosive Ordnance Disposal (EOD) training and certification courses for hundreds of Ukrainian deminers, most working for state agencies tasked with humanitarian and operational demining. In 2024, the organization provided IMAS Level 1 and 2 courses for 130 military personnel. Training sessions spanned five weeks for each of four groups at the PCM-MAT base in Kosovo, covering theoretical classes, identification of hundreds of types of munitions and ordnance, fieldwork, live ordnance detonations, and certification examinations.

The organization also implements IMAS EOD "train-the-trainer" programs to help participants pass their knowledge to others, including courses for managers, team leaders and instructors.

=== Adaptation of training programs ===
Mriya Aid collaborates with PCM-MAT Kosovo to adapt IMAS courses to the Ukrainian context. The organization has developed an augmented approach, integrating Ukraine-specific mines, munitions, and Improved Explosive Devices Disposal (IEDD) techniques and realities of demining in an active warzone into IMAS EOD course work to address the current challenges faced by Ukraine's Armed Forces and other state agency EOD and IEDD professionals working in Ukraine. In autumn 2024, Mriya Aid conducted a needs analysis as part of their performance measurement to better assess the evolving needs and requirements of Ukrainian demining units, including operations in high-risk areas.

To provide significant numbers of Ukrainian deminers and sappers with the most updated information on mines, munitions and IEDs specific to the Ukrainian context, the organization paid for the printing and distribution of over 3000 copies of a mine and unexploded ordnance (UXO) identification manual. The manual, entitled Miny, compiled by volunteer sappers across Ukraine since 2014.

The manual is also available in a digital version.

=== Major partners ===
In February 2024, Mriya Aid began working directly and primarily with the Main Department of Mine Action, Civilian Protection and Environmental Safety of the Ministry of Defence of Ukraine.

In October 2024, Mriya Aid signed a memorandum of understanding with the Ukrainian Deminers Association.

In October 2024, Mriya Aid was invited to join the International Demining Coalition supporting Ukraine’s demining capabilities, as one of a handful of non-governmental partners. The Coalition, currently called the Demining Capability Coalition, is led by the Ministry of Defence of Lithuania and Iceland, and includes the participation of over 23 countries working with the Main Department of Mine Action, Civilian Protection and Environmental Safety of the Ministry of Defence of Ukraine, as well as other Ukrainian agencies working under the authority of the MoD of Ukraine.
