= Claude Giroux =

Canadian ice hockey player (born 1988)

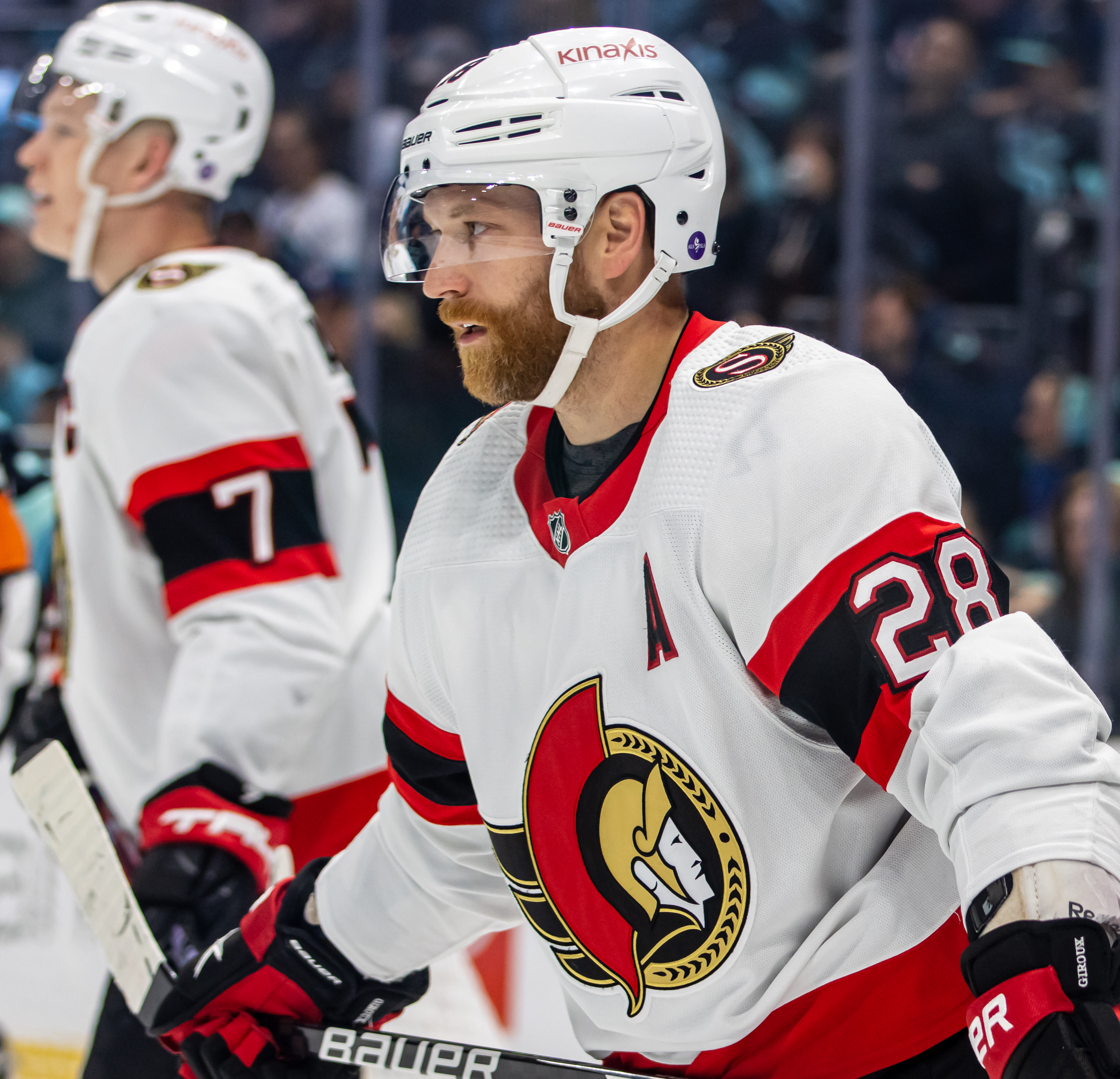
- Giroux with the Ottawa Senators in March 2023
- Born: January 12, 1988 (age 38) Hearst, Ontario, Canada
- Height: 5 ft 11 in (180 cm)
- Weight: 185 lb (84 kg; 13 st 3 lb)
- Position: Forward
- Shoots: Right
- NHL team Former teams: Ottawa Senators; Philadelphia Flyers; Eisbären Berlin; Florida Panthers
- National team: Canada
- NHL draft: 22nd overall, 2006; Philadelphia Flyers
- Playing career: 2007–present

Claude Giroux (French pronunciation: [klod ʒiʁu]; born January 12, 1988) is a Canadian professional ice hockey player who is a forward and alternate captain for the Ottawa Senators of the National Hockey League (NHL). He has previously played for the Philadelphia Flyers and the Florida Panthers. Selected by the Flyers 22nd overall in the 2006 NHL entry draft, Giroux was named the Flyers' team captain in 2013, and became the longest-tenured captain in team history. Giroux played his 1,000th game with the Flyers on March 17, 2022. Giroux has been known to be a very flexible offensive player; capable of playing comfortably on both centre and wing throughout his career.

Before playing in the NHL, Giroux played his major junior career with the Gatineau Olympiques of the Quebec Major Junior Hockey League (QMJHL), where he helped the team win a 2008 President's Cup and earned the Guy Lafleur Trophy as the 2008 playoff MVP. Internationally, he won a gold medal with Team Canada in the 2008 World Junior Ice Hockey Championships.

Giroux made his debut with the Flyers in February 2008 and joined the roster full-time midway through the 2008–09 season. In 2011, after the trades of Mike Richards and Jeff Carter, Giroux took over the role of the club's first-line centre. He was the club's top point-scorer for seven seasons. In 2012 and 2014, he finished third in the league in point scoring. In 2018, he finished second in the league with 102 points, behind only Connor McDavid.

== Early life ==
Giroux was born on January 12, 1988, in Hearst, Ontario, a Francophone town, and is fluent in both English and French. He is the son of Raymond and Nicole Giroux, and has one sister named Isabelle. Giroux's favourite hockey player growing up was Pavel Bure.

In mid 2002, at the age of 14, Giroux and his family moved to Ottawa, Ontario, where he attended Béatrice-Desloges High School in the suburban community of Orléans, but graduated in 12th grade at Minto French Catholic Highschool due to the school schedule being flexible around his busy hockey schedule. While living in Orléans, Giroux played Major Bantam AA and Minor Midget AA hockey for the Cumberland Barons, and was the club's leading scorer in the 2002–03 and 2003–04 seasons. After being passed over in the 2004 Ontario Hockey League (OHL) draft, Giroux played for the Cumberland Grads during the 2004–05 season at age 16. Despite missing most of the season after contracting mononucleosis, Giroux scored 40 points in 48 games and was named the Central Junior A Hockey League (CJHL)'s Rookie of the Year.

== Playing career ==
=== Junior ===
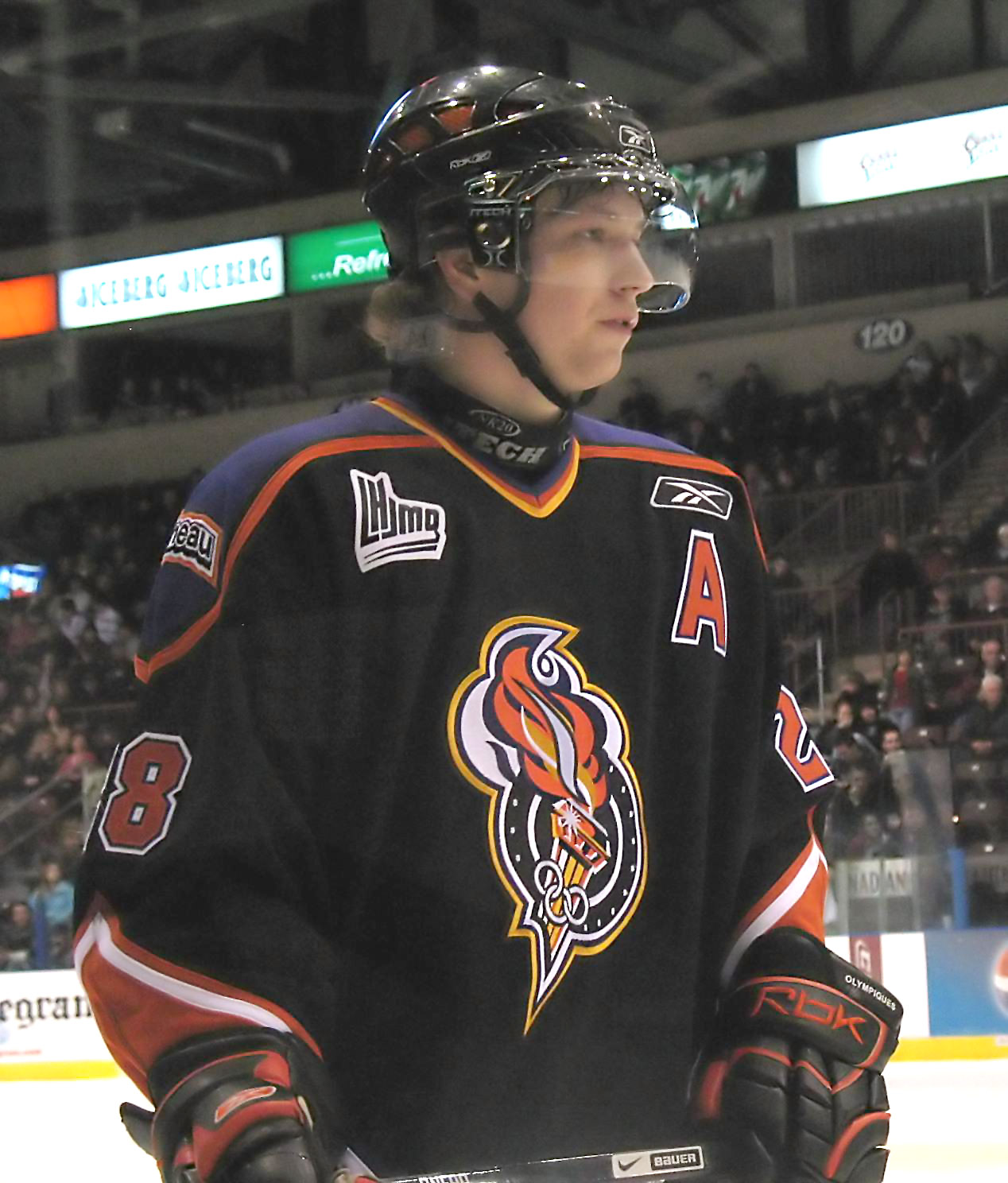
Giroux with the Gatineau Olympiques in 2007

A free agent, Giroux was invited to the (QMJHL)'s Gatineau Olympiques training camp for a walk-on tryout. He was signed shortly after. During his rookie season with the Olympiques, Giroux scored 39 goals for a total of 103 points in 69 games and was named QMJHL Rookie of the Year. He was selected by the Philadelphia Flyers of the NHL in the first round, 22nd overall, of the 2006 NHL entry draft. The Flyers signed Giroux to an entry-level contract on July 23, 2007.

Giroux made his NHL debut when the Flyers visited the Ottawa Senators on February 19, 2008, recording no points and being the team's first shooter in the shootout. Sent back down to the Olympiques, he helped the club win the QMJHL Playoffs and earned himself the Guy Lafleur Trophy as MVP in the QMJHL playoffs by scoring 17 goals and 34 assists in 19 playoff games, also setting a franchise record.

On February 20, 2019, Giroux's number 28 was retired with the Olympiques.

=== Professional ===
==== Philadelphia Flyers (2008–2022) ====
After a disappointing training camp for the Flyers at the beginning of the 2008–09 season, Giroux was assigned to the team's American Hockey League (AHL) affiliate, the Philadelphia Phantoms. After acclimatizing to professional hockey, however, things turned around quickly; he was named Rookie of the Month for December for his eight goals and six assists in eight games played. He was then called up to the Flyers after the Christmas break and remained there throughout the rest of the season. On December 30, he recorded his first NHL point by assisting on a Jeff Carter goal in a win over the Vancouver Canucks. He suffered a mild concussion during the next game when Corey Perry of the Anaheim Ducks elbowed him in the head. Giroux finished the game but missed the next five; Perry was suspended for four games. On January 27, 2009, Giroux scored his first NHL goal against goaltender Tomáš Vokoun and the Florida Panthers in a 3–2 loss. He ended the 2008–09 season with nine goals and 27 points in 42 games played. His first Stanley Cup playoff goal came in a 6–3 win in game three of the opening round in the 2009 playoffs against Pittsburgh Penguins goaltender Marc-André Fleury. The same game also saw him setting up a short-handed goal when he stole the puck in the corner of the Penguins zone and outworked their backcheck, skating past the back of their net twice protecting the puck while looking for incoming support in the form of Simon Gagné. Giroux and the Flyers would be defeated by the fourth-seeded and eventual Stanley Cup champion Penguins in six games. He played all six games and recorded two goals and three assists for five points.

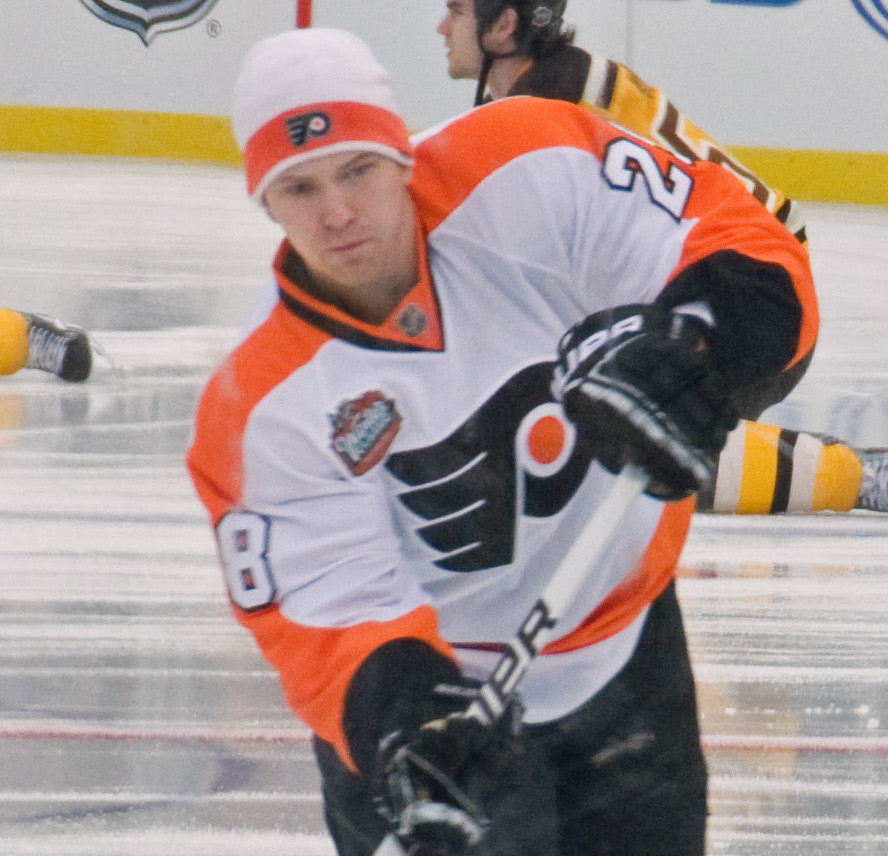
Giroux with the Philadelphia Flyers during the 2010 NHL Winter Classic

The Flyers were an inconsistent team for the bulk of the 2009–10 season, which affected all of their players. Giroux spent a large amount of time centring a line with James van Riemsdyk, the highly-touted rookie winger that the Flyers had drafted second overall in 2007. The team's fortunes, however, soon turned dramatically, as they finished third in the Atlantic Division and qualified for the playoffs by winning the last game of the season against their rival, the New York Rangers, with Giroux scoring the game-winning shootout goal against Henrik Lundqvist. Girioux finished the season fifth on the team in goals and fourth in points. Despite coming in as the conference seventh seed, the Flyers dismantled the second-seeded New Jersey Devils in the first round, winning the series 4–1. The Flyers then made an historic comeback in the semifinals against the sixth-seeded Boston Bruins, becoming only the third team in NHL history, and first since 1975, to overcome a three-game deficit in the playoffs; the series win earned the team a spot in the Eastern Conference Final against the eighth-seeded Montreal Canadiens. The Flyers dominated the Canadiens, winning the series 4–1, and advanced to the Stanley Cup Final. In the 2010 Stanley Cup Finals against the second-seeded Chicago Blackhawks, Giroux put up 4 points in the series, including the game-winning goal in overtime of game three, but the Flyers eventually lost the series 4–2. Giroux ended the post-season with 21 points, cementing his reputation as an emerging young talent.

A month into the 2010–11 season, the Flyers signed Giroux to a three-year, $11.25 million contract extension. The contract, which was signed on November 8, 2010, accounted for a $3.75 million cap hit annually. On January 11, 2011, Giroux was named to the 2011 NHL All-Star Game roster. Giroux played his 200th career game on March 26, 2011, against the New York Islanders. He finished his break-out season with 25 goals and 51 assists for 76 points in all 82 games as the Flyers finished second in the East and third in the NHL overall. Giroux would follow up by scoring a goal and 11 assists for 12 points in all 11 2011 playoff games, in which the Flyers erased a 3–2 series deficit and defeated the seventh-seeded Buffalo Sabres in seven games but were ultimately defeated in a four-game sweep in the second round by the third seeded and eventual Stanley Cup champion Boston Bruins.

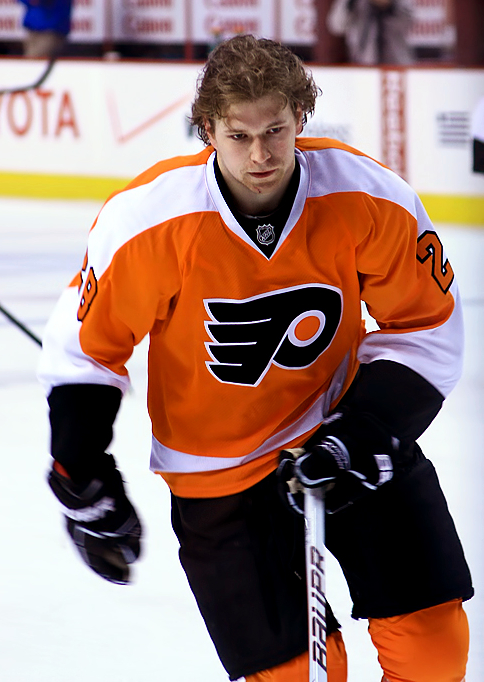
Giroux during warmups in April 2011

After the Flyers traded away Jeff Carter and Mike Richards in the 2011 off-season, Giroux took over the role as first line centre for the club. The trading of Richards and Carter also made him the second-longest tenured member of the Flyers. Giroux formed a new top line with Scott Hartnell and free agent acquisition Jaromír Jágr. Giroux led the League in point-scoring for much of the season, and was considered a favourite for the Hart Memorial Trophy for league MVP at the season's All-Star break. He finished the 2011–12 season with 93 points (28 goals and 65 assists) in 77 games. His 93 points ranked third in the league only behind the 97 points by Tampa Bay Lightning centre Steven Stamkos and the league-leading 109 points by Pittsburgh Penguins centre Evgeni Malkin, respectively. the Flyers as a team finished fifth in the East and Giroux also finished fourth in the Hart Trophy voting as Malkin, Stamkos and New York Rangers goaltender Henrik Lundqvist were named the three finalists with Malkin winning the award with Stamkos finishing second and Lundqvist finishing third in the voting, respectively. On April 13, 2012, in game two of the first round of the 2012 playoffs against the Pittsburgh Penguins, Giroux recorded his first career hat trick. He recorded six points during that same game, earning a Flyers record for most points during a single Stanley Cup playoff game. The Flyers would go on to upset the fourth-seeded Penguins in six games. On May 7, 2012, Giroux received a one-game suspension for a hit to the head of New Jersey Devils forward Dainius Zubrus during game four of the Eastern Conference Semi-finals. After the Flyers were defeated by the Devils in five games and eliminated from the playoffs, Giroux ended the playoffs as the Flyers' top playoff point scorer (17 points). After the Flyers' elimination, Giroux had surgery on both of his wrists; the right to repair torn cartilage, and the left to remove bone spurs. He later claimed that Penguins' captain Sidney Crosby had repeatedly slashed his wrists during face-offs in the first round series against Pittsburgh. At the time news of the surgery was revealed, Giroux was still the playoffs' leading point scorer, even though his team had been eliminated two weeks earlier. On June 20, 2012, Giroux was named the cover athlete for NHL 13 at the NHL awards in Las Vegas; he became the first Philadelphia Flyer on an EA Sports NHL video game cover since Eric Lindros on NHL 99.

During the 2012–13 NHL lock-out, Giroux and Flyers teammate Daniel Brière played for Eisbären Berlin of the German Deutsche Eishockey Liga (DEL). In his ninth game in Germany, he suffered a neck and shoulder injury that was initially feared to be a concussion. He returned to North America and remained inactive through the remainder of the lock-out. After the lock-out ended, Giroux was named the 19th team captain in Flyers history on January 15, 2013, taking over for the indefinitely-injured Chris Pronger. Giroux got off to a slow start once the shortened 2012–13 season began. Missing linemates Jaromír Jagr, who signed with the Dallas Stars during free agency, and Scott Hartnell, who suffered a broken foot during the third game of the season, Giroux registered only seven points through the team's first 13 games. His season turned around once right winger Jakub Voráček, who was also struggling, was placed on his line. From February 12 through the end of the regular season, Giroux was the fourth-most productive player in the League, scoring 10 goals and 30 assists for a total of 40 points during that span. He finished with 48 points (13 goals and 35 assists) in all 48 games and new linemate Voráček finished with a career-high 22 goals. The team as a whole struggled, however, and the Flyers missed the playoffs for the first time since the 2006–07 season.

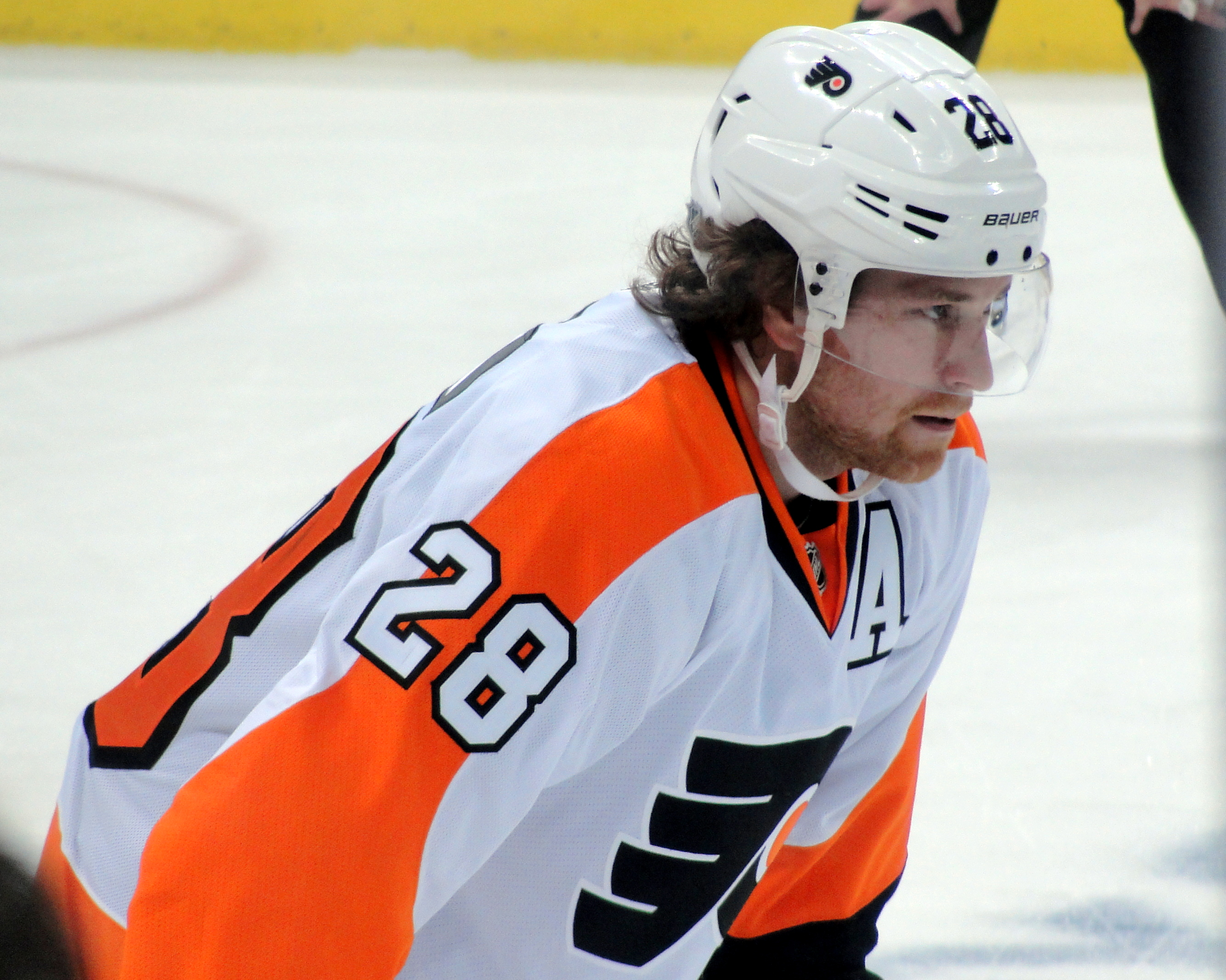
Giroux with the Flyers in April 2012

On July 5, 2013, Giroux signed an eight-year, $66.2 million contract extension to stay in Philadelphia. The entire Flyers team struggled to begin the season, as Philadelphia won just one of their first eight games. Giroux was no exception, and had a difficult start to the 2013–14 season. In his first 15 games, he put up just seven assists and failed to tally a goal. Eventually, the team's struggles ran their course and the Flyers' and Giroux's play seemed to revert to normal. Giroux's year took another turn when it came down to the Olympic roster selection. He was one of the biggest names left off of the Canadian team. But since that point, Giroux picked up his play. As of April 12, he was third in the league in points and the Flyers were in third place in the Metropolitan Division. At the conclusion of the season, Giroux was nominated for the NHL's Hart Trophy and the Ted Lindsay Award, both of which he lost to Pittsburgh Penguins centre and captain Sidney Crosby, finishing third overall in the voting for both awards behind Crosby and Anaheim Ducks centre and captain Ryan Getzlaf.

After the Flyers were defeated in the first round of the 2016 playoffs by the Presidents’ Trophy-winning Washington Capitals, Giroux required surgery to repair hip and abdominal muscle injuries in May 2016. The following year, Giroux ended the season with 14 goals, which concluded a 3-season streak of 20-plus goal seasons. Giroux said the lack of numbers was due to him still recovering from the surgery in 2016.

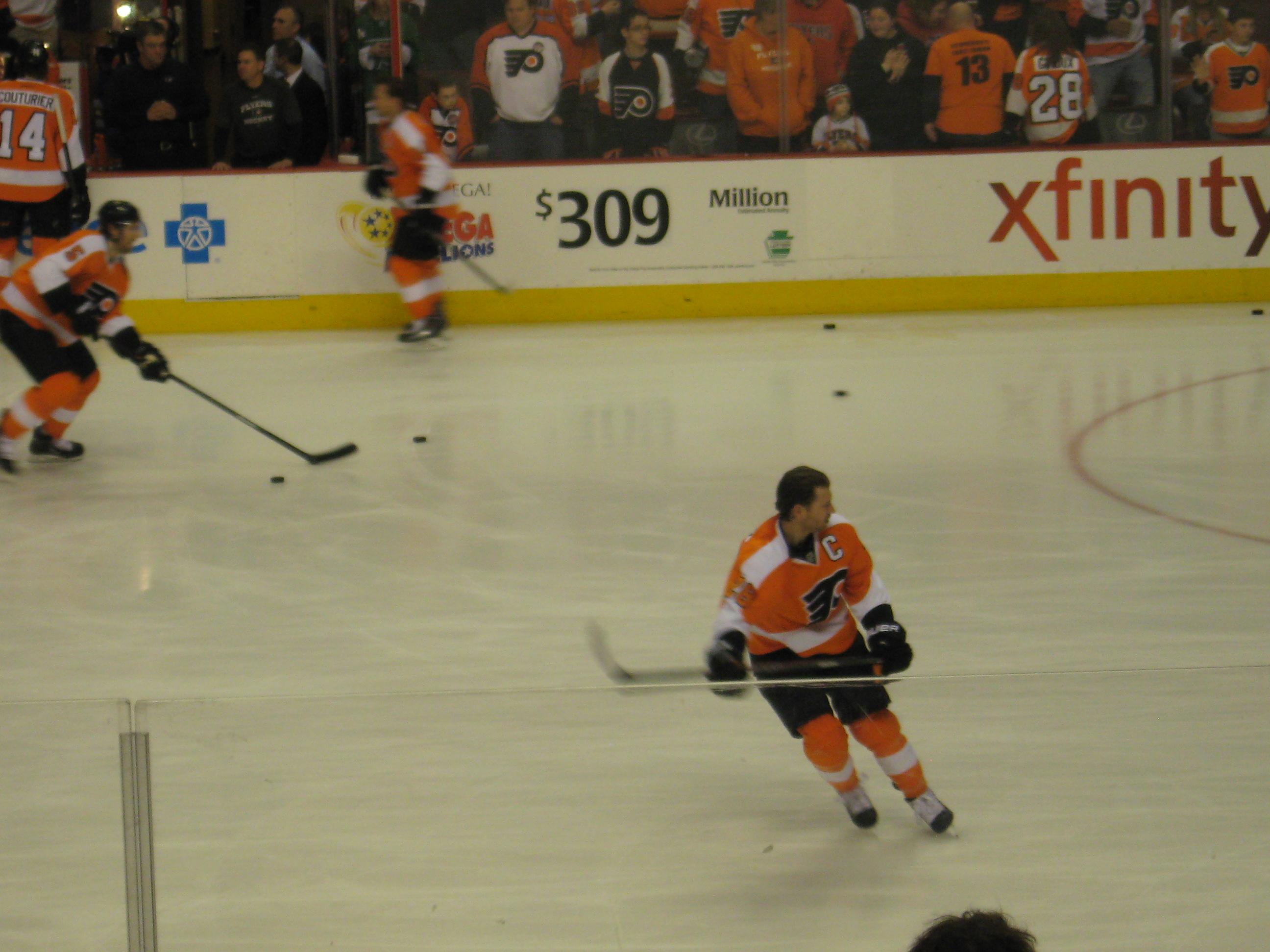
Giroux as team captain of the Philadelphia Flyers prior to a game in March 2014

Things began turning upwards for Giroux during the 2017–18 season, as he moved from centre to wing. This allowed Sean Couturier to move up to the top line, and both players had career years as a result. He was named to the 2018 NHL All-Star Game for the fifth time in his career during this season. This also made him the first Flyers skater since John LeClair and Eric Lindros to be selected for the All-Star Game roster five or more times. On March 13, 2018, after the Philadelphia Eagles released Brent Celek, Giroux became the longest tenured professional athlete in Philadelphia. On March 20, 2018, Giroux passed Eric Lindros for 5th on the Flyers' all-time scoring list. He recorded an assist on Sean Couturier's goal to record point 660. Near the conclusion of the regular season, Giroux was nominated for the Bill Masterton Trophy, and was later awarded the Bobby Clarke Trophy and the Toyota Cup award. In the final game of the regular season, Giroux became the sixth player in Flyers franchise history to reach the 100-point mark in a season, recording a power-play goal in the second period of a 5–0 win against the New York Rangers. He was the first Flyers' player to reach 100 points in a season since Eric Lindros in 1995–96. Giroux helped the Flyers qualify for the 2018 playoffs as the fifth seed in the East, where he recorded three points (a goal and two assists) in all six games in an eventual first round loss in six games to the two-time defending Stanley Cup champion and fourth-seeded Pittsburgh Penguins. Following the season, Giroux was named a Second-Team NHL All-Star. He also finished fourth in the Hart Memorial Trophy voting.

On January 26, 2021, in a match against the New Jersey Devils, Giroux recorded his 611th game played as Flyers team captain, beating Bobby Clarke's 1984 record. Giroux's iron man streak of 328 consecutive games ended on February 18, when he was unavailable to play a game against the New York Rangers due to a positive COVID-19 test. Giroux returned on February 24, and recorded three assists in the Flyers' 4–3 win against the New York Rangers.

On December 10, 2021, Giroux recorded his 334th career power play point with an assist on Sean Couturier's goal; in doing so, he passed Bobby Clarke's record for most power play points in Flyers history. On December 29, 2021, two days shy of the anniversary of his first NHL point, Giroux assisted on a James van Riemsdyk goal against the Seattle Kraken for his 600th career assist and 884th career point. He is the tenth active player to achieve 600 assists, and his points total surpassed Hall of Famer Bill Barber for second overall in Flyers' franchise history. With the Flyers having a poor 2021–22 season and his contract approaching expiration, the possibility of Giroux being traded in advance of the 2022 Stanley Cup playoffs became a major point of discussion in sports media. Giroux was named the captain of the Metropolitan Division team for the 2022 NHL All-Star Game, his seventh all-star game appearance, and was named MVP of the game after scoring two goals in the finals. Giroux scored his 900th NHL point in his 999th NHL game on March 13, 2022, a 4–3 loss to the Montreal Canadiens, while also passing Eric Lindros for eighth place on the Flyers' all-time goals list.

On March 17, 2022, Giroux played in his 1,000th NHL game, a 5–4 home victory over the Nashville Predators. Mere days before the trade deadline, it was widely assumed that this would be his final game with the team. He was presented with a silver stick at a pre-game ceremony by Bobby Clarke, and named the first star of the game despite not registering a point. He became the 40th NHL player to play 1,000 games with a single team, and only the second Flyer, after Clarke.

==== Florida Panthers (2022) ====
On March 19, 2022, Giroux was traded to the Florida Panthers along with a 2024 fifth-round pick, Connor Bunnaman, and German Rubtsov in exchange for Owen Tippett, a 2024 first-round draft pick, and a 2023 third-round pick. He made his debut with the Panthers in a March 24 road game against the Montreal Canadiens, registering two assists in a 4–3 victory. He scored his first goal with his new team in an April 5 game against the Toronto Maple Leafs, where the Panthers rallied to a 7–6 victory in overtime after a 5–1 deficit in the second period. Giroux finished the regular season with 3 goals and 20 assists in 18 games, while the Panthers finished first in the league and won the Presidents' Trophy.

Entering the 2022 Stanley Cup playoffs as one of the favourites, the Panthers faced the Washington Capitals in the first round. Giroux played a pivotal role in the series-clinching win in game six against the eighth-seeded Capitals, leading the team past the first round for the first time in a quarter century. In the second round matchup against the two-time defending Stanley Cup champion and fifth-seeded Tampa Bay Lightning, the Panthers were swept in four games, bringing the postseason run to an end. Following the defeat, Giroux said that he was contemplating re-signing with the Panthers.

==== Ottawa Senators (2022–present) ====
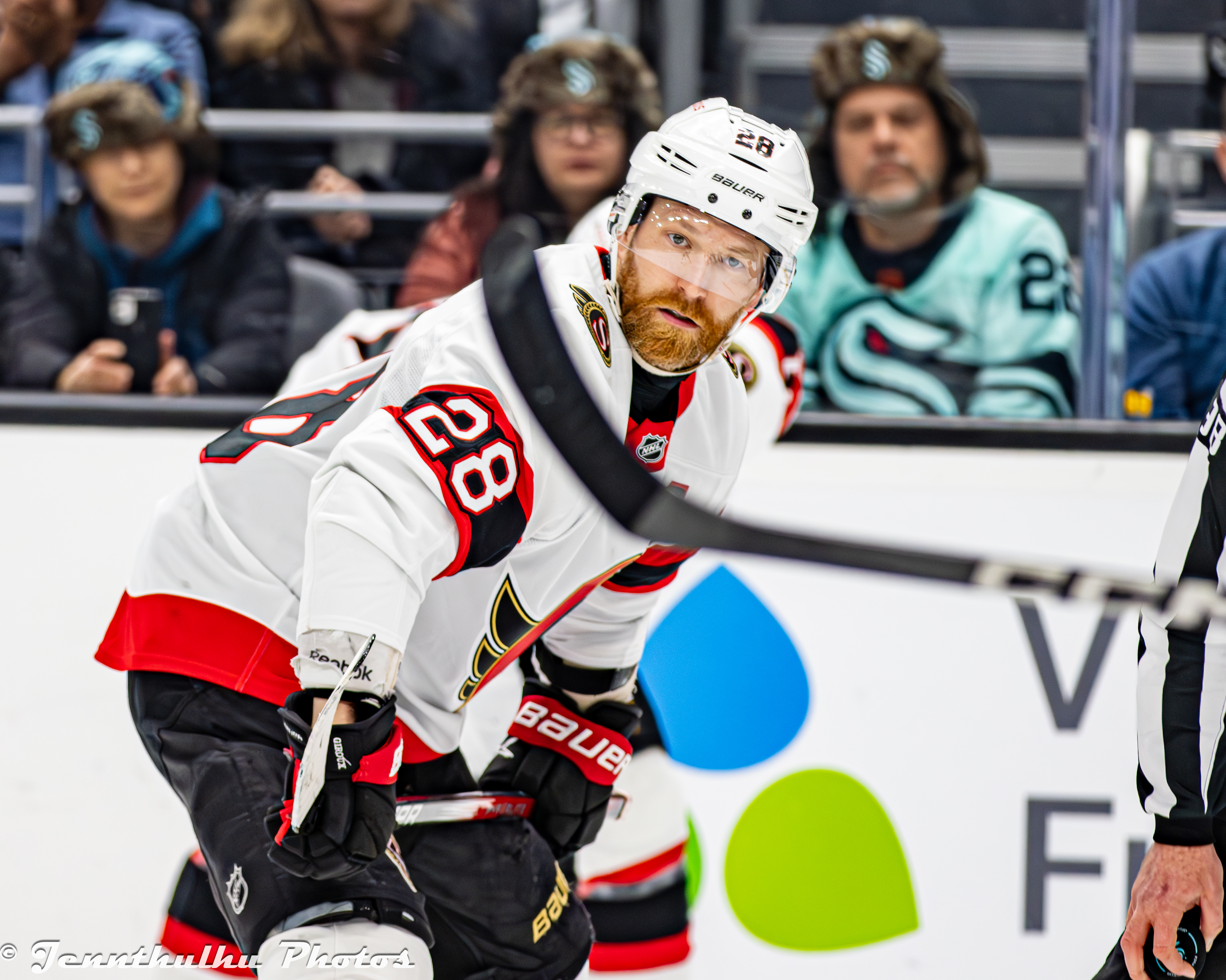
Giroux with the Ottawa Senators in December 2024.

On July 13, 2022, Giroux signed a three-year, $19.5 million contract with the Ottawa Senators. He was announced as an alternate captain on September 19, 2022. Giroux recorded his 300th career goal in a November 5, game against his old team, the Flyers. On April 10, 2023, the Senators played their last home game of the season against the Carolina Hurricanes. Late in the first period, Giroux threaded a pass to teammate Tim Stützle, who buried the 35-year-old's 1,000th career point. Giroux's teammates swarmed him in a celebration of the special moment. Giroux would finish the game with two goals and one assist in a 3–2 victory. Giroux racked up a career high in goals (35) and 44 assists for 79 points in all 82 contests in his first season with the Senators.

On June 29, 2025, Giroux signed a one-year contract extension with Ottawa.

On July 7, 2026, Giroux was re-signed to a one-year contract by the Senators.

== International play ==
Medal record

Men's ice hockey

Representing Canada

World Championships
Gold medal – first place	2015 Czech Republic	
Silver medal – second place	2017 Germany/France	

World Cup of Hockey
Gold medal – first place	2016 Toronto	

World Junior Championships
Gold medal – first place	2008 Czech Republic	

Giroux competed with Team Canada in the International Ice Hockey Federation (IIHF) World Junior Ice Hockey Championship (WJC) in 2008. He scored two goals and four assists in seven games to help Canada win its fourth consecutive WJC. He competed with Team Canada in the IIHF World Championship in April 2013. He scored three goals and five assists in eight games. In 2015, he was a member of Canada's gold medal-winning team at the World Hockey Championships. He competed with Team Canada in the 2015 IIHF World Championship, and was awarded Player of the Game in the team's victory against Team Russia in the final game of the Championship.

== Personal life ==
During the 2010–2011 season, Giroux lived with teammate Daniel Brière and Brière's three sons in their Haddonfield, New Jersey, home. In 2011, Giroux moved out and into an apartment with teammate Brayden Schenn.

During the 2012–13 lockout, Giroux also made a voice appearance in the 2012 TV film, The Magic Hockey Skates (based on the book of the same name).

On July 1, 2014, Giroux was arrested by police in Ottawa after twice grabbing the buttocks of a male police officer while intoxicated inside an Ottawa nightclub. Though he reportedly spent the night in jail, no charges were laid.

In December 2016, Giroux became engaged to his longtime girlfriend Ryanne Breton and the two married in July 2018. They have three sons.

In May 2023, Giroux was given a sponsor's exemption to play in the professional golf PGA Tour Canada event Commissionaires Ottawa Open and was also the tournament's honorary chair.

During the 2024–25 season, he was the victim of two auto thefts at his Ottawa home.

== Records ==
- Gatineau Olympiques – most points in a single QMJHL playoff run (51 points in 19 playoff games)
- Philadelphia Flyers – most points in a single Stanley Cup playoffs game (6)
- Philadelphia Flyers – most games played by a team captain (715)
- Philadelphia Flyers – most power play points (334)

== Career statistics ==
=== Regular season and playoffs ===
Bold indicates led league

			Regular season					Playoffs
Season	Team	League	GP	G	A	Pts	PIM	GP	G	A	Pts	PIM
2003–04	Cumberland Barons	ODMHA	39	31	28	59	28	—	—	—	—	—
2004–05	Cumberland Grads	CJHL	48	13	27	40	30	—	—	—	—	—
2005–06	Gatineau Olympiques	QMJHL	69	39	64	103	64	17	5	15	20	24
2006–07	Gatineau Olympiques	QMJHL	63	48	64	112	49	5	2	5	7	2
2006–07	Philadelphia Phantoms	AHL	5	1	1	2	6	—	—	—	—	—
2007–08	Gatineau Olympiques	QMJHL	55	38	68	106	37	19	17	34	51	6
2007–08	Philadelphia Flyers	NHL	2	0	0	0	0	—	—	—	—	—
2008–09	Philadelphia Phantoms	AHL	33	17	17	34	22	—	—	—	—	—
2008–09	Philadelphia Flyers	NHL	42	9	18	27	14	6	2	3	5	6
2009–10	Philadelphia Flyers	NHL	82	16	31	47	23	23	10	11	21	4
2010–11	Philadelphia Flyers	NHL	82	25	51	76	47	11	1	11	12	8
2011–12	Philadelphia Flyers	NHL	77	28	65	93	29	10	8	9	17	13
2012–13	Eisbären Berlin	DEL	9	4	15	19	6	—	—	—	—	—
2012–13	Philadelphia Flyers	NHL	48	13	35	48	22	—	—	—	—	—
2013–14	Philadelphia Flyers	NHL	82	28	58	86	46	7	2	4	6	2
2014–15	Philadelphia Flyers	NHL	81	25	48	73	36	—	—	—	—	—
2015–16	Philadelphia Flyers	NHL	78	22	45	67	53	6	0	1	1	2
2016–17	Philadelphia Flyers	NHL	82	14	44	58	38	—	—	—	—	—
2017–18	Philadelphia Flyers	NHL	82	34	**68**	102	20	6	1	2	3	2
2018–19	Philadelphia Flyers	NHL	82	22	63	85	24	—	—	—	—	—
2019–20	Philadelphia Flyers	NHL	69	21	32	53	28	16	1	7	8	2
2020–21	Philadelphia Flyers	NHL	54	16	27	43	12	—	—	—	—	—
2021–22	Philadelphia Flyers	NHL	57	18	24	42	20	—	—	—	—	—
2021–22	Florida Panthers	NHL	18	3	20	23	6	10	3	5	8	0
2022–23	Ottawa Senators	NHL	82	35	44	79	34	—	—	—	—	—
2023–24	Ottawa Senators	NHL	82	21	43	64	26	—	—	—	—	—
2024–25	Ottawa Senators	NHL	81	15	35	50	18	6	1	4	5	0
2025–26	Ottawa Senators	NHL	82	14	35	49	22	4	0	0	0	0
NHL totals			1,345	379	786	1,165	518	105	29	57	86	39

=== International ===
Year	Team	Event	Result	GP	G	A	Pts	PIM
2008	Canada	WJC	1st place, gold medalist(s)	7	2	4	6	8
2013	Canada	WC	5th	8	3	5	8	12
2015	Canada	WC	1st place, gold medalist(s)	10	3	7	10	4
2016	Canada	WCH	1st place, gold medalist(s)	1	0	0	0	0
2017	Canada	WC	2nd place, silver medalist(s)	10	2	4	6	4
Junior totals				7	2	4	6	8
Senior totals				29	8	16	24	20

== Awards and honours ==
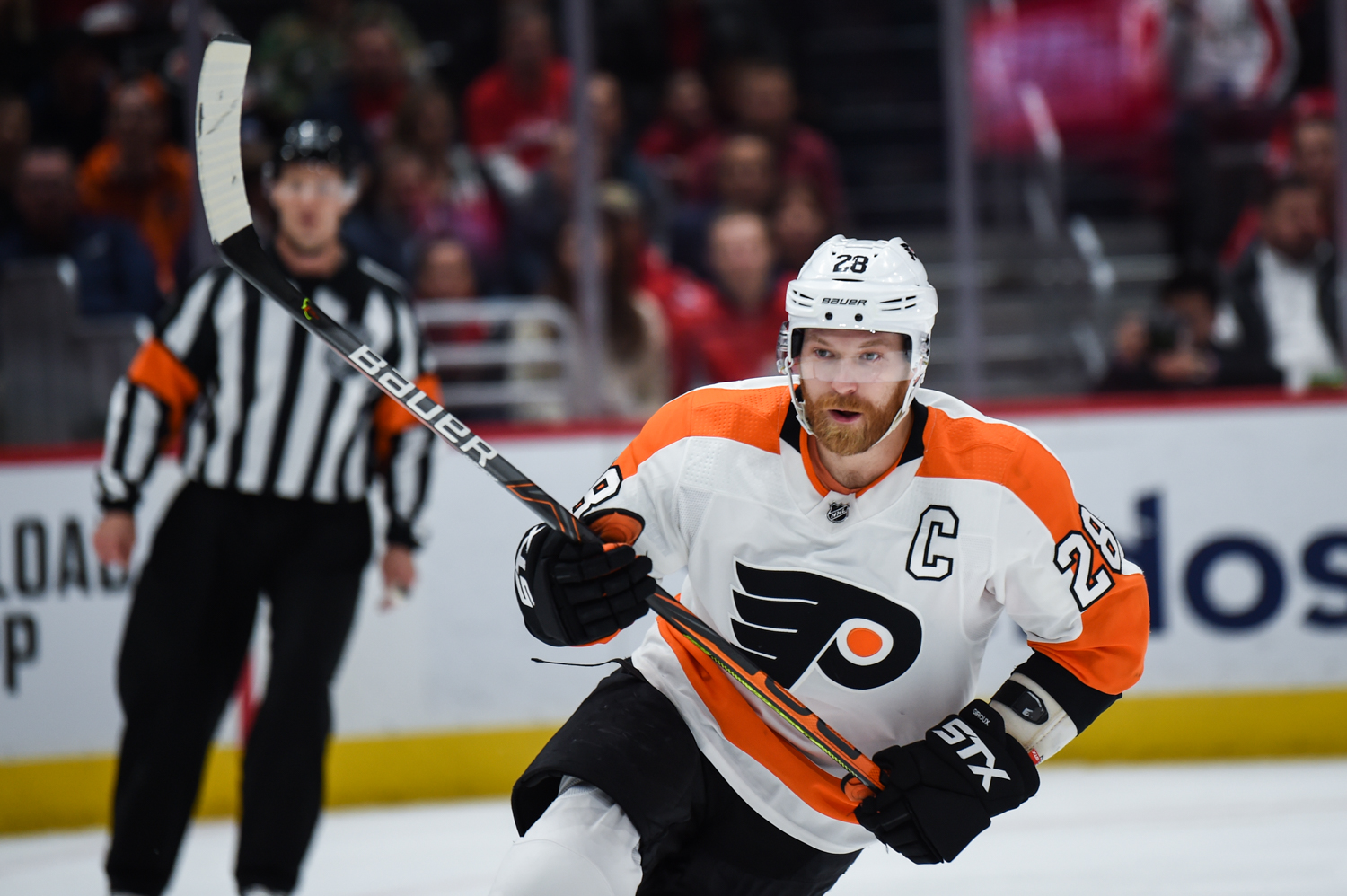
Giroux was named to the NHL All–Star Game seven times; he was named the All–Star MVP in 2022.

=== QMJHL ===
- Played in the 2005–06 CHL Top Prospects Game
- QMJHL Rookie of the Month – December 2005 and March 2006
- 2005–06 QMJHL All-Rookie Team
- QMJHL Offensive Player of the Month – September 2006
- 2008 President's Cup (QMJHL playoff champion) with Gatineau Olympiques
- 2008 Guy Lafleur Trophy (QMJHL playoff MVP)
- 2007–08 QMJHL First All-Star Team
- 2007–08 Canadian Major Junior First All-Star Team
- Jersey number 28 retired by Gatineau Olympiques on February 20, 2019

=== AHL ===
- AHL Rookie of the Month – December 2008

=== NHL ===
- 7× NHL All-Star Game – 2011, 2012, 2015, 2016, 2018, 2019, 2022
- NHL Second All-Star Team – 2018
- NHL All-Star Game MVP – 2022

==== Philadelphia Flyers ====
- Bobby Clarke Trophy – 2011, 2012, 2014, 2016, 2018
- Gene Hart Memorial Award – 2011
- Toyota Cup (3 Stars Award) – 2012, 2013, 2014, 2015, 2016, 2018, 2021

=== Other ===
- Named 2011 Pro Athlete of the Year by the Philadelphia Sports Writers Association
- 2012 recipient of the Philadelphia Sports Congress' John Wanamaker Athletic Award
- Voted in as the cover athlete for EA Sports' NHL 13 video game
- Game-winning goal against the Columbus Blue Jackets voted by Flyers fans as the team's "Highlight of the Year" during the 2013–14 season
- Game-winning overtime goal against the Winnipeg Jets, along with the assist by Shayne Gostisbehere, voted by Flyers fans as the team's "Highlight of the Year" during the 2015–16 season
- Named 2018 Saku Koivu Award (Comeback Player) recipient by The Hockey News

Awards and achievements
Preceded by Steve Downie	Philadelphia Flyers' first-round draft pick 2006	Succeeded by James van Riemsdyk
Preceded by Chris Pronger; Jakub Voráček; Jakub Voráček; Wayne Simmonds	Winner of the Bobby Clarke Trophy; 2011, 2012; 2014; 2016; 2018	Succeeded by Jakub Voráček; Jakub Voráček; Wayne Simmonds; Sean Couturier
Preceded by Chris Pronger	Philadelphia Flyers captain 2013–2022	Succeeded by Sean Couturier
