= École secondaire catholique Garneau =

Location
- 6588, rue Carrière (Orléans community); Ottawa, Ontario; Canada; 45°27′56.31″N 75°31′28.61″W

Information
- School type: French language Separate Catholic (publicly funded)
- Motto: Apprendre pour devenir (Learn to become)
- Religious affiliation: Roman Catholic
- Opened: 1972
- School board: Conseil des écoles catholiques du Centre-Est
- Principal: Caroline Viau
- Grades: 7–12
- Language: French
- Colours: Grey and Navy
- Mascot: Obélix
- Website: garneau.ecolecatholique.ca

École secondaire catholique Garneau (Garneau Catholic High School), is a French-language high school teaching grades 7–12 in the community of Orléans in the eastern end of Ottawa, Ontario, Canada. Garneau is overseen by the Conseil des écoles catholiques du Centre-Est (CECCE).

== History ==
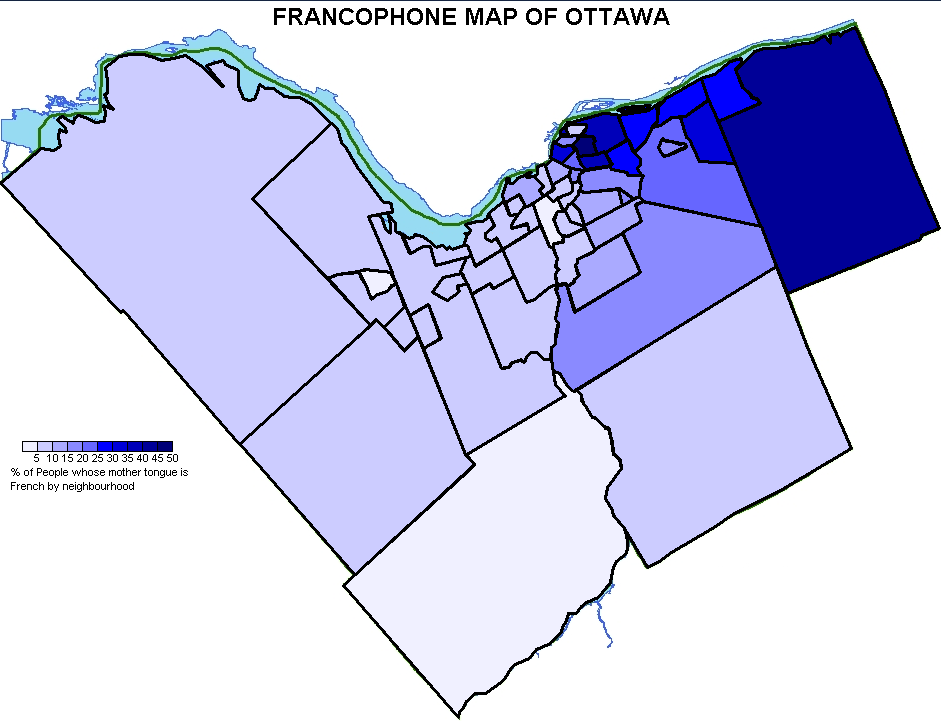
Map of Ottawa showing the francophone concentrations

In 1972, the school opened and was named in honour of the 19th-century French-Canadian politician, poet, and historian François-Xavier Garneau.

=== Building and location ===
In 2001, the construction of École élementaire Garneau, a new addition onto École secondaire Garneau, was due in part to expanding demographics, the expanded school-closure of the francophone intermediate school, École intermédiaire Léo-D-Côté and its transformation into École élémentaire catholique Saint-Joseph d'Orléans. Garneau High School would eventually serve as both a high school and intermediate school, which, according to the Ministry of Education of Ontario, are two distinct schools: École intermédiaire Garneau 7e–8e and École secondaire catholique Garneau. Both schools are located at 6588 Rue Carrière, Ottawa, Ontario.

In 2024, a sports dome was opened at Garneau, managed jointly by the CECCE and the Ottawa TFC Soccer Club.

=== Over-population ===
École secondaire catholique Béatrice-Desloges, another Catholic high school in the Ottawa—Orléans region, was constructed in 1997 and gradually integrated students one grade year at a time. This prevented most students attending Garneau from switching over to the new school. It also gradually reduced Garneau's over-population.

=== Geography ===
Garneau is located in a highly francophone area. The next closest structure and organization, which is 200 meters to the east of Garneau, is the Mouvement d'implication Francophone d'Orléans (MIFO), an organisation that promotes francophone culture within the community of Orléans.

In April 2008, according to the City of Ottawa, Garneau was located in the Innes ward, previously known as "Old Ward no. 2". The property area consisted of 20.22 acres (81,800 m^{2}) and was legally described as "CON 2 OF PT LOT 3".

== Parks ==
Garneau High School has several surrounding parks and fields that are regularly used by students and east-end athletic associations. In 2007, the Orléans Bengals and Gloucester Dukes football clubs publicly complained about the mosquito infestation within the east-end Ottawa fields, especially the Garneau fields. Innes Councilor Rainer Bloess jokingly stated in a press conference that he "went up to visit and see if they really had a problem or if they were just being wimps." He also stated that "after being with them [athletic or football associations] for five minutes I beat a hasty retreat back to my van and spoke to them through a little crack in the window... enough to convince me that the location is obviously a prime mosquito location." In June 2007, Councillors Bloess, Rob Jellett and Bob Monette agreed to a year-long pilot program to reduce the amount of mosquito larvae by possibly using biological protein crystals produced by naturally occurring bacteria called Bti.

== Programs offered ==
=== CCNA Cisco courses and computers ===
Garneau and Cisco Systems have paired together to offer the students of grade 10, 11 and 12 a college-level Cisco CCNA networking course.

== Notable alumni ==
- Ivanie Blondin, speed skater who won gold and silver medals in the 2022 Winter Olympics in Beijing
- Pierre Dorion, former general manager of the Ottawa Senators

== See also ==
- Education in Ontario
- List of secondary schools in Ontario
