= Collège catholique Franco-Ouest =

Location
- 411 Seyton Drive; Ottawa, Ontario, K2H 8X1; Canada; 45.3147°N 75.8344°W

Information
- School type: Separate high school
- Religious affiliation: Catholic
- Founded: 1991
- School board: Conseil des écoles catholiques du Centre-Est
- Grades: 7-12
- Language: French
- Mascot: Les Vikings (Ocnarf)
- Public transit access: OC Transpo: 88 Kanata/Baseline, 57 Bells Corners-Bayshore/Tunney's Pasture
- Website: franco-ouest.ecolecatholique.ca

Collège catholique Franco-Ouest is a French Catholic high school in the Nepean district of Ottawa, Ontario, Canada. It is located on 411 Seyton Drive in Bells Corners. It is an accredited school of the IB offering their middle and diploma programs.

== History ==
The school first opened to students in Grades 8 and 9 in September 1991 at 148 Meadowlands Drive West, in what was then the city of Nepean. It officially received the name "Collège catholique Franco-Ouest" in December of that year. In 1992, the school received its students at the Sir John A. Macdonald building, on 2675 Draper Avenue, and taught students in Grades 8 through 10. In 1994, teaching encompassed Grades 11 and 12, and starting in 2001, 7th graders were admitted.

In 1999, the school announced that a move to its current location of 411 Seyton Drive, basically swapping with St. Paul's High School that was located there at the time.

Between 2005 and 2006, the school underwent extensive renovations worth six million dollars. These renovations have resulted in a new gym, an atrium, a chapel (later temporarily converted to a music room) and several new classrooms.

During the 2024–2025 school year, the building that previously housed the Dominican University College operated as a satellite campus for Collège catholique Franco-Ouest for grades 7 and 8. Starting in September of 2025, the building has become the site of École secondaire catholique Saint-Jean-Baptiste.

== See also ==
- Education in Ontario
- List of secondary schools in Ontario
