= École secondaire catholique Sainte-Marie-Rivier =

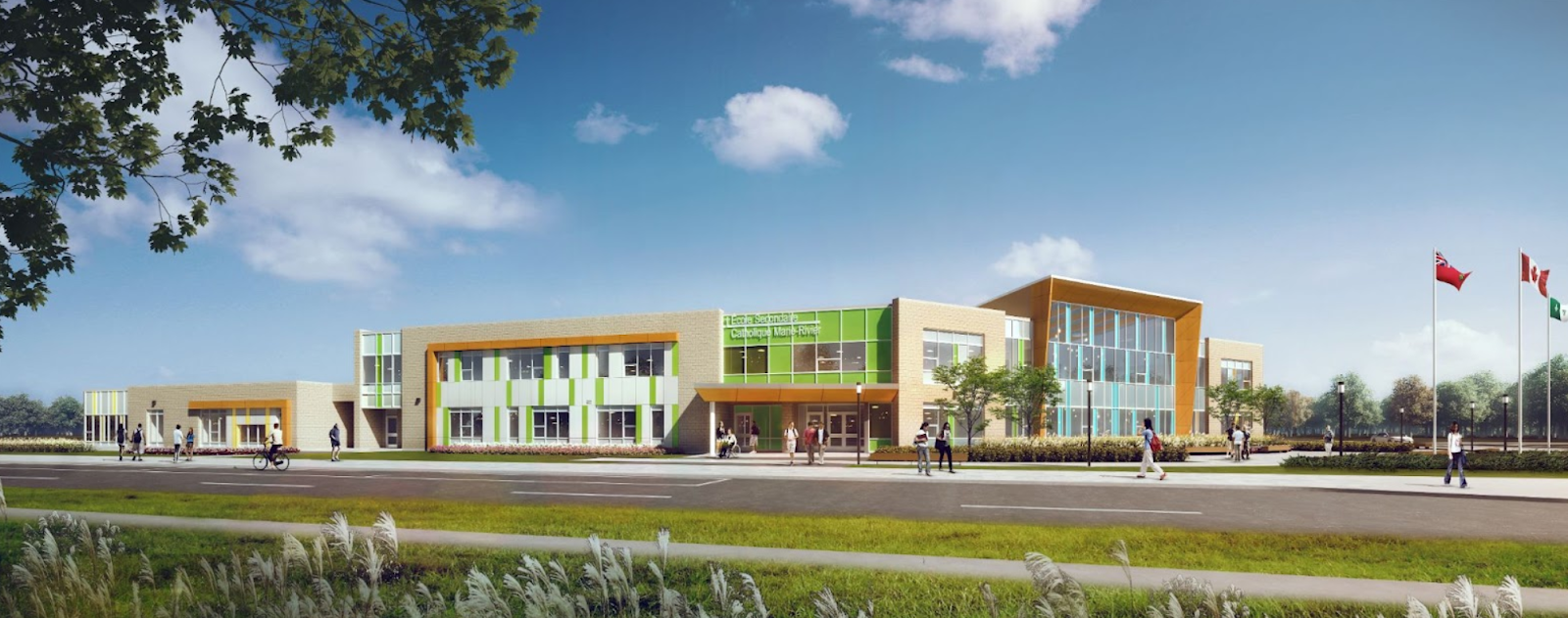
- New building shared with École secondaire publique Mille-Îles

Location
- 1381 Demers Ave; Kingston, Ontario, K7M 3X9; Canada

Information
- School type: Francophone separate Catholic (publicly funded)
- Religious affiliation: Roman Catholic
- School board: Conseil des écoles catholiques du Centre-Est
- Superintendent: Marie-France Paquette
- Principal: Laurent Mukendi
- Grades: 7–12
- Enrollment: 282 (2021-01-08)
- Language: French
- Colours: Silver and blue
- Mascot: Dragon
- Website: marie-rivier.ecolecatholique.ca

École secondaire catholique Sainte-Marie-Rivier (Saint-Marie-Rivier Catholic High School) is a French language high school for grades 7–12 located in Kingston, Ontario, Canada. It is part of the St-François d'Assise parish and the Conseil des écoles catholiques du Centre-Est (CECCE).

== History ==
École secondaire catholique Sainte-Marie-Rivier has occupied several sites over its history. The school initially took the shape of a scattering of portables outside the much larger Regiapolis Notre Dame Catholic Secondary School school in Kingston. In 1989, the Centre Culturel Frontenac spearheaded a campaign to find a new location for the students as well as a location for the French community to organize events in the city. After renovating an existing textile factory, l'École Secondaire Catholique Marie-Rivier obtained its own building at 711 Dalton.

In 2007, the CECCE obtained joint funding of 36.7 million dollars with the Conseil des écoles publiques de l'Est de l'Ontario (CEPEO) from primarily the provincial government to construct a new shared building for the two French middle-high schools, École secondaire catholique Sainte-Marie Rivier of the CECCE and École secondaire publique Mille-Îles of CEPEO. The schools share a gym, biology and chemistry labs, a music room, an art room, woodshop and metal shop space, a library, a cafeteria, and an atrium. The school began operating from this site in September 2023. The site is also shared by the Centre culturel Frontenac.

In 2026, an outdoor sports facility was opened to share between the two schools.

In 2024, the school changed its name from École secondaire catholique Marie-Rivier to its current name following the canonization of Marie Rivier, the school's namesake.

== Specialized programs ==
École secondaire catholique Sainte-Marie-Rivier offers an enrichment program for grades 7–8, which includes more projects (such as mandatory participation in the regional science fair) accompanied by more individual learning of the material normally covered during those grades. The school also provides a STEM focus program, which includes 3D modelling, 3D printing, and robotics. There are dance and hockey focus programs. There are no AP nor IB options offered.

== See also ==
- Education in Ontario
- List of secondary schools in Ontario
