= École secondaire catholique Thériault =

Location
- 341 Theriault Boulevard; Timmins, Ontario, P4N 7K3; Canada
- Coordinates: 48.48281°N 81.34928°W

Information
- Type: French Catholic Secondary School
- Motto: Exceller, Vivre, Grandir (Exceling, Living, Growing)
- Established: 1968
- School board: Conseil scolaire catholique des Grandes Rivières
- Principal: Chantal Bourgon
- Grades: 9 to 12
- Enrollment: Approx 900
- Colours: Yellow, Burgundy and Grey
- Team name: Les Flammes de Thériault
- Website: www.esct.on.ca

École secondaire catholique Thériault is a secondary school located in Timmins, Ontario. It is a Francophone Roman Catholic school administered by the Conseil scolaire catholique des Grandes-Rivières.

The school was established in 1968 through the amalgamation of Collège Sacré-Coeur, Collège Notre-Dame, and l'Académie Don Bosco.

== See also ==
- Education in Ontario
- List of secondary schools in Ontario
