= Conseil des écoles catholiques du Centre-Est =

Canadian French-language school board

Conseil des écoles catholiques du Centre-Est (Centre-East French Catholic School Board)
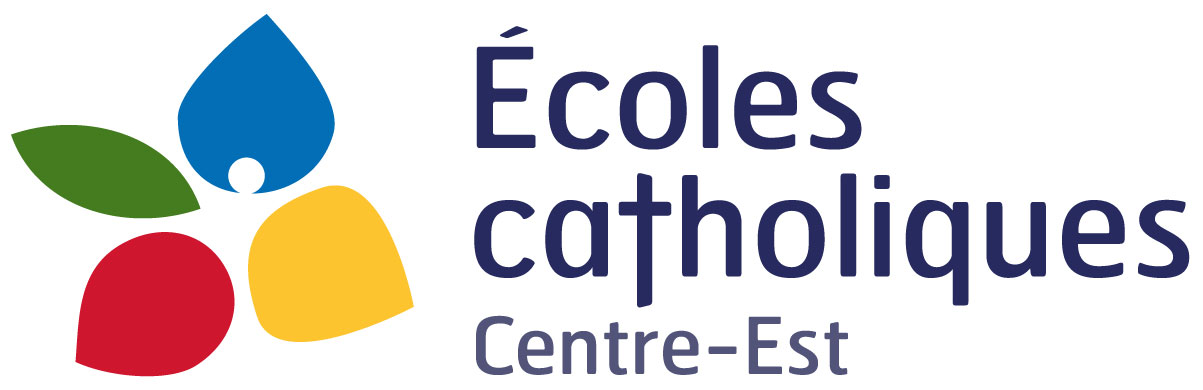

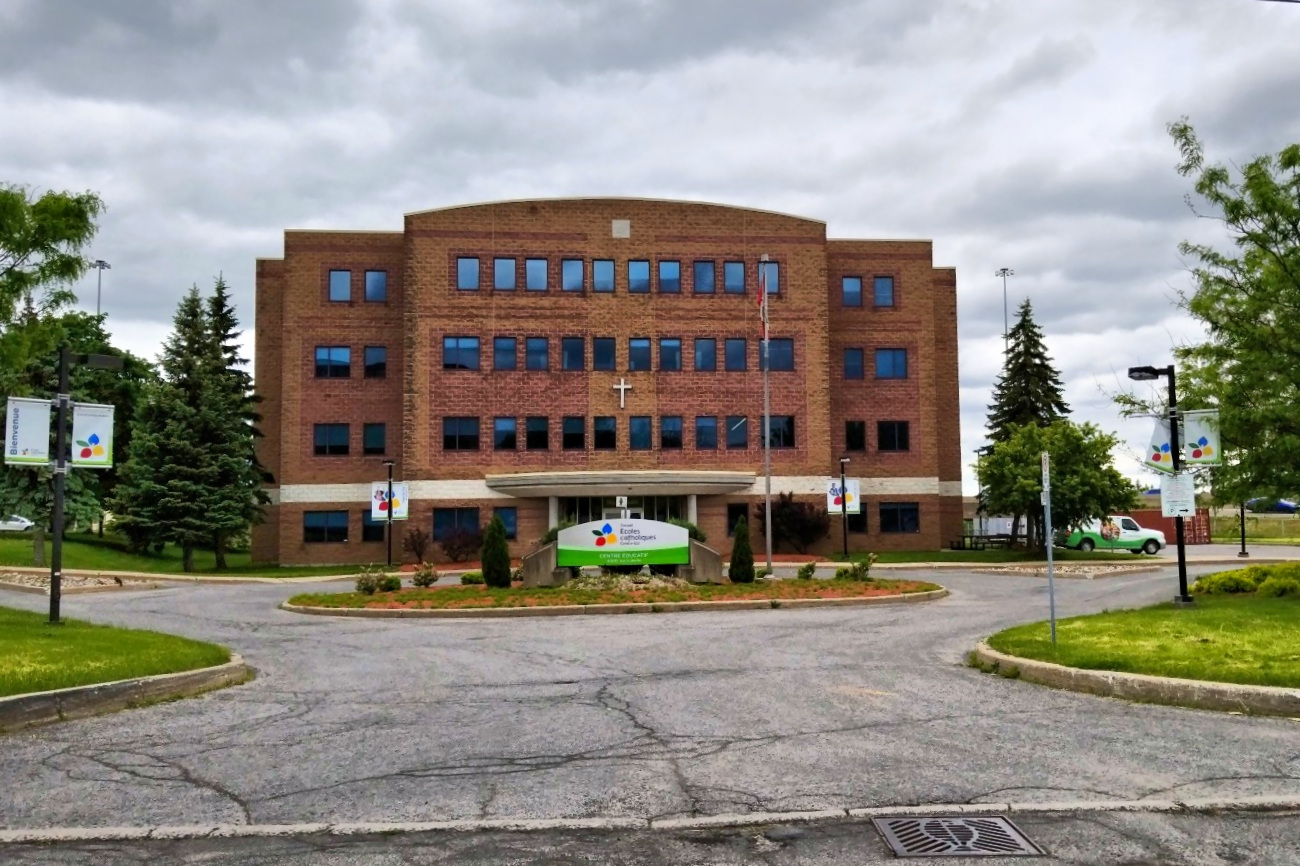
- Head office in Ottawa

Location
- 4000 Labelle Street, Ottawa K1J 1A1 Ontario Canada
- Coordinates: 45.42182°N 75.63423°W

District information
- Grades: Pre-K through 12
- Established: 1998; 28 years ago
- Superintendent: Jason Dupuis; Danielle Chatelain; Eugénie Congi; Guy Dubois; Jean-François Bard Marie-France Paquette
- Schools: 46 elementary schools 13 high schools 1 school for adults
- Budget: CA$226 million (2010-2011)
- District ID: B67334

Students and staff
- Students: 28,000

Other information
- Chair of the Board: Johanne Lacombe
- Vice-chair of the Board: Daniel Boudria
- Director of Education: Marc Bertrand (Associate)
- Elected trustees: Brigitte Pilon; Anouk Tremblay; Johanne Lacombe; Diane Doré; Monique Briand; Daniel Boudria; Denis Poirier; André Thibodeau; Chad Marriage; Diane Burns; Robert Lemelin
- Website: www.ecolecatholique.ca/en/

The Conseil des écoles catholiques du Centre-Est (CECCE, "Centre-East French Catholic School Board"), formerly known as the Conseil des écoles catholiques de langue française du Centre-Est (CECLFCE), is Ontario's largest French-language school board. The CECCE operates 46 elementary schools, 13 high schools, and a school for adults. Over 28,000 students from Junior Kindergarten to Grade 12 attend CECCE schools. The board employs approximately 3,000 teachers and professionals and it covers an area of 35,615 km^{2}, including the City of Ottawa. Its headquarters are in the Gloucester area of Ottawa.

The predecessor school district, the Conseil des écoles catholiques de langue française de la région d'Ottawa-Carleton (CECLF), had its headquarters at the current CECCE headquarters; previously, Gloucester was a separate municipality.

== List of schools ==
=== Elementary ===
- École élémentaire catholique Édouard-Bond - Enseignement personnalisé
- École élémentaire catholique l’Étoile-de-l’Est
- École élémentaire catholique la Source - Enseignement personnalisé
- École élémentaire catholique Reine-des-Bois
- École élémentaire catholique Saint-Joseph d’Orléans
- École élémentaire catholique des Voyageurs
- École élémentaire catholique Arc-en-ciel
- École élémentaire catholique de la Découverte
- École élémentaire catholique des Pionniers
- École élémentaire catholique Saint-Guillaume
- École élémentaire catholique la Vérendrye
- École élémentaire catholique Montfort
- École élémentaire catholique des Pins
- École élémentaire catholique le Petit Prince
- École élémentaire catholique Sainte-Anne
- École élémentaire catholique Sainte-Marie
- École élémentaire catholique Sainte-Kateri
- École élémentaire catholique Vision Jeunesse
- École élémentaire catholique Georges-Étienne-Cartier
- École élémentaire catholique Lamoureux - Enseignement personnalisé
- École élémentaire catholique Marius-Barbeau
- École élémentaire catholique Notre-Dame-Des-Champs
- École élémentaire catholique Sainte-Bernadette
- École élémentaire catholique Sainte-Geneviève
- École élémentaire catholique Saint-Laurent
- École élémentaire catholique Sainte-Thérèse-d’Avila
- École élémentaire catholique Élisabeth-Bruyère
- École élémentaire catholique J.-L.-Couroux
- École élémentaire catholique Laurier-Carrière
- École élémentaire catholique Pierre-Elliott-Trudeau
- École élémentaire catholique Roger-Saint-Denis
- École élémentaire catholique Saint-François-d’Assise
- École élémentaire catholique Sainte-Marguerite-Bourgeoys
- École élémentaire catholique Jean-Paul II
- École élémentaire catholique Terre-des-Jeunes
- École élémentaire catholique Jean-Robert Gauthier
- École élémentaire catholique Bernard-Grandmaître
- École élémentaire catholique Académie catholique Ange Gabrielle
- École élémentaire catholique Monseigneur Rémi-Gaulin
- École élémentaire Jonathan-Pitre

=== High school ===
- École secondaire catholique Béatrice-Desloges, Ottawa
- Collège catholique Franco-Ouest, Ottawa
- Collège catholique Mer-Bleue, Ottawa
- Collège catholique Samuel-Genest, Ottawa
- Centre professionel et technique Minto, Ottawa
- École secondaire catholique Paul-Desmarais, Ottawa
- École secondaire catholique Franco-Cité, Ottawa
- École secondaire catholique Garneau, Ottawa
- École secondaire catholique Pierre-Savard, Ottawa
- École secondaire catholique Saint-Jean-Baptiste, Ottawa
- École secondaire catholique Marie-Rivier, Kingston
- Académie catholique Ange Gabrielle, Brockville
- Centre scolaire catholique Jeanne-Lajoie, Pembroke

== See also ==
- List of school districts in Ontario
- List of high schools in Ontario
